= 1998 French Open – Men's singles qualifying =

Men's singles qualifying
- 1998 French Open

Events
Singles	men	women		boys	girls
Doubles	men	women	mixed	boys	girls
WC Singles	men	women	quad
WC Doubles	men	women	quad
Legends	−45	45+	women

Qualification
Singles	men	women
- French Open

Players who neither had high enough rankings nor received wild cards to enter the main draw of the annual French Open Tennis Championships participated in a qualifying tournament held in the week before the event.

== Seeds ==
1. (Argentina) Guillermo Cañas (second round)
2. (Argentina) Franco Squillari (second round)
3. (Germany) Oliver Gross (qualifying competition, lucky loser)
4. (Argentina) Mariano Puerta (first round)
5. (Netherlands) John van Lottum (qualified)
6. (India) Leander Paes (qualifying competition)
7. (Italy) Vincenzo Santopadre (qualifying competition)
8. (Germany) Jens Knippschild (qualified)
9. (Brazil) André Sá (first round)
10. (United States) Justin Gimelstob (first round)
11. (Germany) Rainer Schüttler (second round)
12. (Russia) Marat Safin (qualified)
13. (Australia) Andrew Ilie (qualified)
14. (Romania) Adrian Voinea (first round)
15. (Spain) Jacobo Diaz-Ruiz (second round)
16. (Netherlands) Dennis van Scheppingen (first round)
17. (Germany) Dirk Dier (first round)
18. (Germany) Lars Burgsmüller (first round)
19. (Australia) Sandon Stolle (qualifying competition)
20. (Finland) Tuomas Ketola (first round)
21. (Argentina) Francisco Cabello (qualifying competition)
22. (Italy) Cristiano Caratti (qualifying competition)
23. (Brazil) Márcio Carlsson (second round)
24. (Argentina) Sebastian Prieto (first round)
25. (Italy) Marzio Martelli (qualified)
26. (Spain) Óscar Burrieza (first round)
27. (United States) Jonathan Stark (second round)
28. (United States) Michael Sell (qualified)
29. (Spain) Alex Lopez-Moron (first round)
30. (Spain) Pepe Imaz (qualified)
31. (Belgium) Christophe Van Garsse (qualified)
32. (Australia) Peter Tramacchi (second round)

== Qualifiers ==
1. (Belgium) Christophe Van Garsse
2. (France) Julien Boutter
3. (Spain) Pepe Imaz
4. (Germany) Bernd Karbacher
5. (Netherlands) John van Lottum
6. (United States) Michael Sell
7. (Italy) Marzio Martelli
8. (Germany) Jens Knippschild
9. (Italy) Mosé Navarra
10. (Spain) Jordi Mas
11. (France) Rodolphe Gilbert
12. (Russia) Marat Safin
13. (Australia) Andrew Ilie
14. (Austria) Wolfgang Schranz
15. (Argentina) Mariano Zabaleta
16. (Argentina) Martin Rodriguez

== Lucky losers ==
1. (Germany) Oliver Gross

== Qualifying draw ==
Key

- Q = Qualifier
- WC = Wild card
- LL = Lucky loser
- Alt = Alternate
- ITF = ITF entry
- PR = Protected ranking
- SR = Special ranking
- SE = Special exempt
- JE = Junior exempt
- JR = Junior Accelerator Programme entrant
- CO = College Accelerator Programme entrant
- NG = Next Gen Accelerator Program entrant
- w/o = Walkover
- r = Retired
- d = Defaulted

=== First qualifier ===
First round
1	(Argentina) Guillermo Cañas	6	6
PR	(United States) Michael Joyce	2	3
WC	(France) Jean-René Lisnard	3	1
(Israel) Noam Behr	6	6
(Spain) Roberto Carretero	6^{4}	1^{r}
(Russia) Andrei Merinov	7^{7}	4
(Federal Republic of Yugoslavia) Dušan Vemić	2	6^{4}
31	(Belgium) Christophe Van Garsse	6	7^{7}

Second round
1	(Argentina) Guillermo Cañas	4	5
(Israel) Noam Behr	6	7
(Russia) Andrei Merinov	4	4
31	(Belgium) Christophe Van Garsse	6	6

Qualifying competition
(Israel) Noam Behr	1	1
31	(Belgium) Christophe Van Garsse	6	6

=== Second qualifier ===
First round
2	(Argentina) Franco Squillari	6	6
(Spain) Salvador Navarro	4	2
(Canada) Bobby Kokavec	3	2
(Czech Republic) Radek Štěpánek	6	6
WC	(France) Julien Boutter	6	7
(Russia) Andrey Cherkasov	3	5
WC	(France) Grégory Carraz	4	4
32	(Australia) Peter Tramacchi	6	6

Second round
2	(Argentina) Franco Squillari	2	6^{4}
(Czech Republic) Radek Štěpánek	6	7^{7}
WC	(France) Julien Boutter	6	6
32	(Australia) Peter Tramacchi	3	3

Qualifying competition
(Czech Republic) Radek Štěpánek	4	6	3
WC	(France) Julien Boutter	6	3	6

=== Third qualifier ===
First round
3	(Germany) Oliver Gross	6	6
(United Kingdom) Andrew Richardson	1	2
(South Africa) Neville Godwin	3	2
(Argentina) Gastón Etlis	6	6
(Spain) Tati Rascón	6	6
(United Kingdom) Mark Petchey	4	2
(Australia) Lleyton Hewitt	4	6^{3}
30	(Spain) Pepe Imaz	6	7^{7}

Second round
3	(Germany) Oliver Gross	6	6
(Argentina) Gastón Etlis	2	3
(Spain) Tati Rascón	6	3	4
30	(Spain) Pepe Imaz	4	6	6

Qualifying competition
3	(Germany) Oliver Gross	6^{5}	5
30	(Spain) Pepe Imaz	7^{7}	7

=== Fourth qualifier ===
First round
4	(Argentina) Mariano Puerta	1	3
WC	(France) Thierry Champion	6	6
WC	(France) Pier Gauthier	2	3
(Germany) Bernd Karbacher	6	6
(Italy) Renzo Furlan	7^{10}	6
(Argentina) Agustín Calleri	6^{8}	3
(Egypt) Tamer El-Sawy	6	7^{7}
29	(Spain) Alex Lopez-Moron	3	6^{5}

Second round
WC	(France) Thierry Champion	6	3	4
(Germany) Bernd Karbacher	4	6	6
(Italy) Renzo Furlan	4	7^{7}	6
(Egypt) Tamer El-Sawy	6	6^{5}	2

Qualifying competition
(Germany) Bernd Karbacher	7^{7}	6
(Italy) Renzo Furlan	6^{5}	4

=== Fifth qualifier ===
First round
5	(Netherlands) John van Lottum	6	6
(Denmark) Thomas Larsen	2	4
WC	(France) Rodolphe Cadart	6	6
(France) Régis Lavergne	4	4
(Slovenia) Iztok Božič	6	6
(Australia) Grant Doyle	4	2
WC	(France) Jean-Michel Pequery	6^{5}	4
27	(United States) Jonathan Stark	7^{7}	6

Second round
5	(Netherlands) John van Lottum	6	6
WC	(France) Rodolphe Cadart	4	2
(Slovenia) Iztok Božič	6	6
27	(United States) Jonathan Stark	2	2

Qualifying competition
5	(Netherlands) John van Lottum	6	6
(Slovenia) Iztok Božič	1	3

=== Sixth qualifier ===
First round
6	(India) Leander Paes	6	6
(Italy) Fabio Maggi	3	4
(Australia) Ben Ellwood	4	6	6
(Netherlands) Fernon Wibier	6	4	4
(Mexico) Marco Osorio	0	4
WC	(France) Nicolas Coutelot	6	6
(United Kingdom) Danny Sapsford	1	2
28	(United States) Michael Sell	6	6

Second round
6	(India) Leander Paes	4	6	7
(Australia) Ben Ellwood	6	4	5
WC	(France) Nicolas Coutelot	1	2
28	(United States) Michael Sell	6	6

Qualifying competition
6	(India) Leander Paes	6^{5}	4
28	(United States) Michael Sell	7^{7}	6

=== Seventh qualifier ===
First round
7	(Italy) Vincenzo Santopadre	7
(Japan) Gouichi Motomura	5^{r}
(Italy) Marco Meneschincheri	3	6	6
(Spain) David Sanchez-Munoz	6	2	3
(Belgium) Dick Norman	0	3^{r}
(United States) Mark Merklein	6	4
(France) Stéphane Huet	3	3
25	(Italy) Marzio Martelli	6	6

Second round
7	(Italy) Vincenzo Santopadre	7	6
(Italy) Marco Meneschincheri	5	3
(United States) Mark Merklein	2	2
25	(Italy) Marzio Martelli	6	6

Qualifying competition
7	(Italy) Vincenzo Santopadre	4	2
25	(Italy) Marzio Martelli	6	6

=== Eighth qualifier ===
First round
8	(Germany) Jens Knippschild	7	6
(United States) Wade McGuire	5	4
(United Kingdom) Chris Wilkinson	2	0
(Brazil) Jaime Oncins	6	6
(Austria) Julian Knowle	6	6^{5}	4
(France) Jean-Philippe Fleurian	4	7^{7}	6
(Argentina) Andrés Schneiter	6	6
26	(Spain) Óscar Burrieza	3	3

Second round
8	(Germany) Jens Knippschild	6	6
(Brazil) Jaime Oncins	4	2
(France) Jean-Philippe Fleurian	6	7^{7}
(Argentina) Andrés Schneiter	4	6^{3}

Qualifying competition
8	(Germany) Jens Knippschild	6	6
(France) Jean-Philippe Fleurian	2	4

=== Ninth qualifier ===
First round
9	(Brazil) André Sá	2	7^{7}	5
(Italy) Mosé Navarra	6	6^{1}	7
(Switzerland) Ivo Heuberger	6	6
(Spain) Germán Puentes	2	1
(Sweden) Lars Jonsson	1	4
(Spain) Alberto Martín	6	6
(France) Frédéric Fontang	6	6
24	(Argentina) Sebastian Prieto	2	1

Second round
(Italy) Mosé Navarra	6	2	6
(Switzerland) Ivo Heuberger	4	6	4
(Spain) Alberto Martín	2	7^{7}	8
(France) Frédéric Fontang	6	6^{3}	6

Qualifying competition
(Italy) Mosé Navarra	7	6^{6}	6
(Spain) Alberto Martín	5	7^{8}	4

=== Tenth qualifier ===
First round
10	(United States) Justin Gimelstob	4	4
(Spain) Joan Balcells	6	6
(Italy) Giorgio Galimberti	3	3
(Spain) Jordi Mas	6	6
(Romania) Răzvan Sabău	6	6^{5}	6
(Venezuela) Maurice Ruah	3	7^{7}	3
(Australia) Allen Belobrajdic	6^{12}	0
23	(Brazil) Márcio Carlsson	7^{14}	6

Second round
(Spain) Joan Balcells	6	4	8
(Spain) Jordi Mas	4	6	10
(Romania) Răzvan Sabău	6	7
23	(Brazil) Márcio Carlsson	4	5

Qualifying competition
(Spain) Jordi Mas	3	7	6
(Romania) Răzvan Sabău	6	5	4

=== Eleventh qualifier ===
First round
11	(Germany) Rainer Schüttler	6	6
(Austria) Clemens Trimmel	4	1
(France) Rodolphe Gilbert	6	6
(United States) Cecil Mamiit	3	2
(Israel) Amir Hadad	4	1
(France) Antony Dupuis	6	6
(Germany) Tomas Behrend	3	5
22	(Italy) Cristiano Caratti	6	7

Second round
11	(Germany) Rainer Schüttler	1	7^{7}	5
(France) Rodolphe Gilbert	6	6^{3}	7
(France) Antony Dupuis	3	6	2
22	(Italy) Cristiano Caratti	6	3	6

Qualifying competition
(France) Rodolphe Gilbert	6	6
22	(Italy) Cristiano Caratti	4	1

=== Twelfth qualifier ===
First round
12	(Russia) Marat Safin	6^{1}	6	6
(Italy) Davide Scala	7^{7}	3	4
(Norway) Christian Ruud	6	6
(United States) David DiLucia	4	1
(South Africa) David Nainkin	6	6
(United States) Brian MacPhie	2	4
(Italy) Laurence Tieleman	6^{6}	6	2
21	(Argentina) Francisco Cabello	7^{8}	2	6

Second round
12	(Russia) Marat Safin	7^{7}	6
(Norway) Christian Ruud	6^{5}	4
(South Africa) David Nainkin	4	2
21	(Argentina) Francisco Cabello	6	6

Qualifying competition
12	(Russia) Marat Safin	6	6
21	(Argentina) Francisco Cabello	3	3

=== Thirteenth qualifier ===
First round
13	(Australia) Andrew Ilie	7	7^{7}
(France) Stéphane Simian	5	6^{4}
(Australia) Todd Larkham	6	6
(Norway) Jan-Frode Andersen	4	4
(Czech Republic) Petr Luxa	6	0	8
WC	(France) Julien Varlet	1	6	6
(Israel) Eyal Ran	6	4	2
19	(Australia) Sandon Stolle	4	6	6

Second round
13	(Australia) Andrew Ilie	2	6	6
(Australia) Todd Larkham	6	3	4
(Czech Republic) Petr Luxa	3	6^{0}
19	(Australia) Sandon Stolle	6	7^{7}

Qualifying competition
13	(Australia) Andrew Ilie	6	3	6
19	(Australia) Sandon Stolle	4	6	3

=== Fourteenth qualifier ===
First round
14	(Romania) Adrian Voinea	6^{5}	6	2
(Japan) Takao Suzuki	7^{7}	3	6
(Italy) Daniele Musa	7	4	9
(Ecuador) Luis Morejón	5	6	11
(Austria) Wolfgang Schranz	6	6
(Sweden) Nicklas Kulti	3	4
(Belgium) Christophe Rochus	7	6^{3}	6
20	(Finland) Tuomas Ketola	5	7^{7}	3

Second round
(Japan) Takao Suzuki	6	6
(Ecuador) Luis Morejón	1	2
(Austria) Wolfgang Schranz	6^{5}	6	6
(Belgium) Christophe Rochus	7^{7}	3	4

Qualifying competition
(Japan) Takao Suzuki	6	3	3
(Austria) Wolfgang Schranz	3	6	6

=== Fifteenth qualifier ===
First round
15	(Spain) Jacobo Diaz-Ruiz	6	7^{7}
(Romania) Ionuț Moldovan	2	6^{5}
(Mexico) Mariano Sanchez	5	6^{1}
(Morocco) Younes El Aynaoui	7	7^{7}
(United Kingdom) Martin Lee	3	4
(Italy) Stefano Pescosolido	6	6
(Argentina) Mariano Zabaleta	6	7^{7}
18	(Germany) Lars Burgsmüller	1	6^{5}

Second round
15	(Spain) Jacobo Diaz-Ruiz	5	4
(Morocco) Younes El Aynaoui	7	6
(Italy) Stefano Pescosolido	4	3
(Argentina) Mariano Zabaleta	6	6

Qualifying competition
(Morocco) Younes El Aynaoui	4	7^{7}	3
(Argentina) Mariano Zabaleta	6	6^{2}	6

=== Sixteenth qualifier ===
First round
16	(Netherlands) Dennis van Scheppingen	1	3
(Netherlands) Peter Wessels	6	6
(Mexico) Alejandro Hernandez	6	6^{5}	2
(Netherlands) Edwin Kempes	4	7^{7}	6
(Finland) Tapio Nurminen	2	2
(Sweden) Patrik Fredriksson	6	6
(Argentina) Martin Rodriguez	6	6
17	(Germany) Dirk Dier	2	0

Second round
(Netherlands) Peter Wessels	6^{5}	6^{7}
(Netherlands) Edwin Kempes	7^{7}	7^{9}
(Sweden) Patrik Fredriksson	1	4
(Argentina) Martin Rodriguez	6	6

Qualifying competition
(Netherlands) Edwin Kempes	6^{7}	6	4
(Argentina) Martin Rodriguez	7^{9}	3	6
