= 1998 in tennis =

This page covers all the important events in the sport of tennis in 1998. It provides the results of notable tournaments throughout the year on both the ATP and WTA Tours, the Davis Cup, and the Fed Cup.

== ITF ==
=== Grand Slam events ===
==== Australian Open ====
Category	Champions	Finalists	Score in the final
Men's singles	(Czech Republic) Petr Korda	(Chile) Marcelo Ríos	6–2, 6–2, 6–2 (Note: It was Korda's only Grand Slam title.)
Women's singles	(Switzerland) Martina Hingis	(Spain) Conchita Martínez	6–3, 6–3 (Note: It was Hingis' 4th career Grand Slam title and her 2nd Australian Open title.)
Men's doubles	(Sweden) Jonas Björkman (Netherlands) Jacco Eltingh	(Australia) Todd Woodbridge (Australia) Mark Woodforde	6–2, 5–7, 2–6, 6–4, 6–3 (Note: It was Björkman's 1st career Grand Slam title and his 1st Australian Open title. It was Eltingh's 4th career Grand Slam title and his 2nd and last Australian Open title.)
Women's doubles	(Switzerland) Martina Hingis (Croatia) Mirjana Lučić (Note: Lučić became the first Croatian tennis player to win the Australian Open.)	(United States) Lindsay Davenport (Belarus) Natasha Zvereva	6–4, 2–6, 6–3 (Note: It was Hingis' 7th career Grand Slam title and her 4th Australian Open title. It was Lučić's only career Grand Slam title.)
Mixed doubles	(United States) Justin Gimelstob (United States) Venus Williams	(Czech Republic) Cyril Suk (Czech Republic) Helena Suková	6–2, 6–1 (Note: It was Williams' 1st career Grand Slam title and her 1st Australian Open title. It was Gimelstob's 1st career Grand Slam title and his only Australian Open title.)

==== French Open ====
Category	Champions	Finalists	Score in the final
Men's singles	(Spain) Carlos Moyá	(Spain) Àlex Corretja	6–3, 7–5, 6–3 (Note: It was Moyá's 1st and only career Grand Slam singles title.)
Women's singles	(Spain) Arantxa Sánchez Vicario	(United States) Monica Seles	7–6^{(7–5)}, 0–6, 6–2 (Note: It was Sánchez's 4th and last career Grand Slam singles title and her 3rd title at the French Open.)
Men's doubles	(Netherlands) Jacco Eltingh (Netherlands) Paul Haarhuis	(The Bahamas) Mark Knowles (Canada) Daniel Nestor	6–3, 3–6, 6–3 (Note: It was Eltingh's 5th career Grand Slam doubles title and his 2nd and last title at the French Open.) (Note: It was Haarhuis' 4th career Grand Slam doubles title and his 2nd title at the French Open.)
Women's doubles	(Switzerland) Martina Hingis (Czech Republic) Jana Novotná	(United States) Lindsay Davenport (Belarus) Natalia Zvereva	6–1, 7–6^{(7–4)} (Note: It was Hingis' 4th career Grand Slam doubles title and her 1st title at the French Open.) (Note: It was Novotná's 10th career Grand Slam doubles title and her 3rd and last title at the French Open.)
Mixed doubles	(United States) Venus Williams (United States) Justin Gimelstob	(United States) Serena Williams (Argentina) Luis Lobo	6–4, 6–4 (Note: It was Williams' 2nd and last career Grand Slam mixed doubles title and her 1st title at the French Open.) (Note: It was Gimelstob's 2nd and last career Grand Slam mixed doubles title.)

==== Wimbledon ====
Category	Champions	Finalists	Score in the final
Men's singles	(United States) Pete Sampras	(Croatia) Goran Ivanišević	6–7^{(2–7)}, 7–6^{(11–9)}, 6–4, 3–6, 6–2 (Note: It was Sampras' 11th career Grand Slam singles title and his 5th at Wimbledon.)
Women's singles	(Czech Republic) Jana Novotná	(France) Nathalie Tauziat	6–4, 7–6^{(7–2)} (Note: It was Novotná's 1st and only career Grand Slam singles title.)
Men's doubles	(Netherlands) Jacco Eltingh (Netherlands) Paul Haarhuis	(Australia) Todd Woodbridge (Australia) Mark Woodforde	2–6, 6–4, 7–6^{(7–3)}, 5–7, 10–8 (Note: It was Eltingh's 6th and last career Grand Slam doubles title and his 1st at Wimbledon. It was Haarhuis' 5th career Grand Slam doubles title and his 1st and only at Wimbledon.)
Women's doubles	(Switzerland) Martina Hingis (Czech Republic) Jana Novotná	(United States) Lindsay Davenport (Belarus) Natasha Zvereva	6–3, 3–6, 8–6 (Note: It was Hingis' 5th career Grand Slam doubles title and her 2nd at Wimbledon. It was Novotná's 11th career Grand Slam doubles title and her 4th and last at Wimbledon.)
Mixed doubles	(Belarus) Max Mirnyi (United States) Serena Williams	(India) Mahesh Bhupathi (Croatia) Mirjana Lučić	6–4, 6–4 (Note: It was Williams' 1st career Grand Slam mixed doubles title. It was Mirnyi's 1st career Grand Slam mixed doubles title.)

==== US Open ====
Category	Champions	Finalists	Score in the final
Men's singles	(Australia) Patrick Rafter	(Australia) Mark Philippoussis	6–3, 3–6, 6–2, 6–0 (Note: It was Rafter's 2nd and last career Grand Slam singles title and his 2nd at the US Open.)
Women's singles	(United States) Lindsay Davenport	(Switzerland) Martina Hingis	6–3, 7–5 (Note: It was Davenport's 1st career Grand Slam singles title and her 1st and only at the US Open.)
Men's doubles	(Australia) Sandon Stolle (Czech Republic) Cyril Suk	(The Bahamas) Mark Knowles (Canada) Daniel Nestor	4–6, 7–6, 6–2 (Note: It was Stolle's 1st and only career Grand Slam doubles title.) (Note: It was Suk's 1st and only career Grand Slam doubles title.)
Women's doubles	(Switzerland) Martina Hingis (Czech Republic) Jana Novotná	(United States) Lindsay Davenport (Belarus) Natasha Zvereva	6–3, 6–3 (Note: It was Hingis' 10th career Grand Slam title and her 2nd and last US Open title. It was Novotná's 17th and last career Grand Slam title and her 4th US Open title. With this victory Hingis completed the second doubles Grand Slam in a calendar year in the Open Era, with Martina Navratilova and Pam Shriver having completed the first in 1984.)
Mixed doubles	(United States) Serena Williams (Belarus) Max Mirnyi	(United States) Lisa Raymond (United States) Patrick Galbraith	6–2, 6–2 (Note: It was Williams's 2nd career Grand Slam mixed doubles title and her 1st at the US Open.) (Note: It was Mirnyi's 2nd career Grand Slam mixed doubles title and his 1st at the US Open.)

=== Davis Cup ===
1998 Davis Cup Champions
(Sweden)
Sweden
7th title

Italy
1
Forum di Assago, Milan, Italy
4–6 December
Clay (indoors)

Sweden
4

			1	2	3	4	5
1	(Italy) (Sweden)	Andrea Gaudenzi; Magnus Norman	7^{11} 6^{9}	6^{0} 7^{7}	6; 4	3; 6	6; 6	retired
2	(Italy) (Sweden)	Davide Sanguinetti; Magnus Gustafsson	1; 6	4; 6	0; 6
3	(Italy) (Sweden)	Diego Nargiso / Davide Sanguinetti; Jonas Björkman / Nicklas Kulti	6^{1} 7^{7}	1; 6	3; 6
4	(Italy) (Sweden)	Gianluca Pozzi; Magnus Gustafsson	4; 6	2; 6
5	(Italy) (Sweden)	Diego Nargiso; Magnus Norman	6; 2	6; 3

=== Fed Cup ===
1998 Fed Cup Champions
(Spain)
Spain
5th title

Switzerland
2
Palexpo Hall, Geneva, Switzerland
19–20 September
Greenset hard (indoors)

Spain
3

			1	2	3
1	(Switzerland) (Spain)	Patty Schnyder; Arantxa Sánchez	2; 6	6; 3	2; 6
2	(Switzerland) (Spain)	Martina Hingis; Conchita Martínez	6; 4	6; 4
3	(Switzerland) (Spain)	Martina Hingis; Arantxa Sánchez	7^{7} 6^{5}	6; 3
4	(Switzerland) (Spain)	Patty Schnyder; Conchita Martínez	3; 6	6; 2	7; 9
5	(Switzerland) (Spain)	Martina Hingis / Patty Schnyder; Conchita Martínez / Arantxa Sánchez	0; 6	2; 6

=== Hopman Cup ===
1998 Hopman Cup Champions
(Slovakia)
Slovakia
1st title

Slovakia
2
Burswood Entertainment Complex, Burswood, Australia
4–10 January
Hard (indoors)

France
1

			1	2	3
1	(Slovakia) (France)	Karina Habšudová; Mary Pierce	4; 6	5; 7
2	(Slovakia) (France)	Karol Kučera; Cédric Pioline	7^{9} 6^{7}	6; 4
3	(Slovakia) (France)	Karina Habšudová / Karol Kučera; Mary Pierce / Cédric Pioline	6; 3	6; 4

== ATP ==
=== Year-End Top 10 ===
Singles

#	Player	Points
1	(United States) Pete Sampras	3,784
2	(Czech Republic) Petr Korda	3,484
3	(Australia) Patrick Rafter	3,250
4	(Sweden) Jonas Bjorkman	2,977
5	(Chile) Marcelo Rios	2,808
6	(United States) Michael Chang	2,742
7	(Russia) Yevgeny Kafelnikov	2,690
8	(United Kingdom) Greg Rusedski	2,530
9	(Netherlands) Richard Krajicek	2,299
10	(Spain) Alex Corretja	2,285

Doubles

#	Player	Points
1	(Netherlands) Jacco Eltingh	5,143
2	(Netherlands) Paul Haarhuis	4,270
3	(India) Mahesh Bhupathi	3,816
4	(India) Leander Paes	3,781
5	(Australia) Todd Woodbridge	3,398
6	(Australia) Mark Woodforde	3,398
7	(Canada) Daniel Nestor	3,260
8	(Sweden) Jonas Björkman	3,202
9	(The Bahamas) Mark Knowles	2,967
10	(South Africa) Ellis Ferreira	2,835

== WTA ==
=== Year-End Top 10 ===
Singles

#	Player	Points
1	(United States) Lindsay Davenport	5,654
2	(Switzerland) Martina Hingis	5,366
3	(Czech Republic) Jana Novotná	3,734
4	(Spain) Arantxa Sánchez	3,417
5	(United States) Venus Williams	3,262
6	(United States) Monica Seles	3,226
7	(France) Mary Pierce	2,414
8	(Spain) Conchita Martínez	2331
9	(Germany) Steffi Graf	2,661
10	(France) Nathalie Tauziat	2,259

== Tennis Hall of Fame ==
Class	Inductees	Category
Class of 1998	(United States) Jimmy Connors	Player
Class of 1998	(United Kingdom) Herman David	Contributor
