= 1998 French Open – Boys' singles =

Boys' singles
- 1998 French Open

Final
- Champion: (Chile) Fernando González
- Runner-up: (Spain) Juan Carlos Ferrero
- Score: 4–6, 6–4, 6–3

Details
- Draw: 64 (8Q)

Events
Singles	men	women		boys	girls
Doubles	men	women	mixed	boys	girls
WC Singles	men	women	quad
WC Doubles	men	women	quad
Legends	−45	45+	women
← 1997 ·	French Open	· 1999 →

Daniel Elsner was the defending champion, but was unable to compete in Juniors as he turned 18 years old.

Fernando González won the title by defeating Juan Carlos Ferrero 4–6, 6–4, 6–3 in the final. González became the first Chilean player to win this tournament, and the only one until 2013 after it was won by Cristian Garín.

== Draw ==
=== Key ===
- Q = Qualifier
- WC = Wild card
- LL = Lucky loser
- Alt = Alternate
- SE = Special exempt
- PR = Protected ranking
- ITF = ITF entry
- JE = Junior exempt
- w/o = Walkover
- r = Retired
- d = Defaulted
- SR = Special ranking

=== Finals ===
Quarterfinals
(France) Julien Jeanpierre	5	6	1
(Spain) Juan Carlos Ferrero	7	1	6
(Sweden) Andreas Vinciguerra	6	6
(Brazil) Flávio Saretta	1	2
(Venezuela) José de Armas	2	7	2
(Chile) Fernando González	6	6	6
(Russia) Artem Derepasko	6	6	6
(United States) Taylor Dent	2	7	3

Semifinals
(Spain) Juan Carlos Ferrero	6	7
(Sweden) Andreas Vinciguerra	4	5
(Chile) Fernando González	6	6	7
(Russia) Artem Derepasko	7	1	5

Final
(Spain) Juan Carlos Ferrero	6	4	3
(Chile) Fernando González	4	6	6

=== Top half ===
==== Section 1 ====
First round
(France) J Jeanpierre	6	6
(Russia) I Kunitsyn	1	3
(Argentina) I González King	6	6
(Austria) Phillip Langer	1	2
(France) John Thivolle	6	5	8
(Australia) N Healey	4	7	6
(Switzerland) R Federer	4	7	7
(Czech Republic) J Levinský	6	5	9
(Belgium) O Rochus	4	6	6
(Hungary) B Veress	6	3	4
(Canada) Jean-François Mathieu	4	7	4
(Slovakia) Miloslav Grolmus	6	5	6
(Germany) L Uebel	6	6
(Argentina) Emiliano Redondi	4	2
(Georgia (country)) I Labadze	4	4
(Spain) JC Ferrero	6	6

Second round
(France) J Jeanpierre	7	6
(Argentina) I González King	5	1
(France) J Thivolle	6	0	8
(Czech Republic) J Levinský	3	6	6
(Belgium) O Rochus	7	4	4
(Slovakia) M Grolmus	6	6	6
(Germany) L Uebel	4	1
(Spain) JC Ferrero	6	6

Third round
(France) J Jeanpierre	6	6
(France) J Thivolle	1	2
(Slovakia) M Grolmus	3	2
(Spain) JC Ferrero	6	6

Quarterfinals
(France) J Jeanpierre	5	6	1
(Spain) JC Ferrero	7	1	6

==== Section 2 ====
First round
(Sweden) A Vinciguerra	6	6
(Austria) Simon Wernhart	0	1
(France) JC Faurel	6	6	0
(United States) Simone Amorico	3	7	6
(Italy) F Aldi	6	3	2
(Denmark) Bob Borella	4	6	6
Q	(France) Huu Minh Dinh	1	6	2
(Argentina) D Nalbandian	6	2	6
(Brazil) F Saretta	6	4	7
Q	(France) J Benneteau	3	6	5
(Croatia) L Zovko	6	0	4
(Greece) V Mazarakis	2	6	6
(Austria) J Melzer	7	3	2
(France) O Patience	5	6	6
Q	(Slovenia) A Kračman	7	6
(Ivory Coast) V Sanon	6	4

Second round
(Sweden) A Vinciguerra	6	6
(United States) S Amorico	4	2
(Denmark) B Borella	6	5	2
(Argentina) D Nalbandian	4	7	6
(Brazil) F Saretta	6	6
(Greece) V Mazarakis	2	3
(France) O Patience	3	6	7
Q	(Slovenia) A Kračman	6	1	5

Third round
(Sweden) A Vinciguerra	6	3	6
(Argentina) D Nalbandian	2	6	2
(Brazil) F Saretta	6	2	8
(France) O Patience	4	6	6

Quarterfinals
(Sweden) A Vinciguerra	6	6
(Brazil) F Saretta	1	2

=== Bottom half ===
==== Section 3 ====
First round
(Spain) F López	4	2
(France) J Haehnel	6	6
Q	(Sweden) Johan Kareld	6	6
(United Kingdom) S Dickson	4	2
(Venezuela) J de Armas	5	6	6
Q	(France) É Prodon	7	4	3
Q	(United States) Z Fleishman	2	6
(Czech Republic) R Vik	6	7
(Brazil) R Mello	6	6
(United States) KJ Hippensteel	2	1
(France) Jacques Gley	6	4	4
(Austria) Phillipp Mullner	4	6	6
(France) Julien Maes	4	6	2
(Argentina) E Massa	6	4	6
(Thailand) D Udomchoke	3	4
(Chile) F González	6	6

Second round
(France) J Haehnel	3	6	6
Q	(Sweden) J Kareld	6	3	8
(Venezuela) J de Armas	6	1	6
(Czech Republic) R Vik	3	6	3
(Brazil) R Mello	6	3	7
(Austria) P Mullner	3	6	5
(Argentina) E Massa	7	5	2
(Chile) F González	6	7	6

Third round
Q	(Sweden) J Kareld	6	4	3
(Venezuela) J de Armas	4	6	6
(Brazil) R Mello	4	6
(Chile) F González	6	7

Quarterfinals
(Venezuela) J de Armas	2	7	2
(Chile) F González	6	6	6

==== Section 4 ====
First round
(Russia) A Derepasko	6	6
(France) N Devilder	4	4
(Czech Republic) Ladislav Chramosta	2	6	3
(Austria) A Fasching	6	3	6
(Italy) F Volandri	4	6	3
(Denmark) K Pless	6	3	6
Q	(France) Olivier Ramos	6	6
(Chinese Taipei) Cheng Wei-jen	4	4
(Israel) A Ram	6	6
(France) M Llodra	3	4
(United States) T Dent	6	6
(Sweden) J Adaktusson	2	3
Q	(Ukraine) O Tereshchuk	4	3
(Pakistan) A Qureshi	6	6
(France) T Ascione	7	2	1
(Argentina) G Coria	6	6	6

Second round
(Russia) A Derepasko	6	5	8
(Austria) A Fasching	2	7	6
(Denmark) K Pless	6	6
Q	(France) O Ramos	3	2
(Israel) A Ram	3	2
(United States) T Dent	6	6
(Pakistan) A Qureshi	7	2	2
(Argentina) G Coria	6	6	6

Third round
(Russia) A Derepasko	6	6
(Denmark) K Pless	3	3
(United States) T Dent	6	7
(Argentina) G Coria	4	6

Quarterfinals
(Russia) A Derepasko	6	6	6
(United States) T Dent	2	7	3
