= 1998 French Open – Boys' doubles =

Boys' doubles
- 1998 French Open

Final
- Champions: (Venezuela) José de Armas (Chile) Fernando González
- Runners-up: (Spain) Juan Carlos Ferrero (Spain) Feliciano López
- Score: 6–7, 7–5, 6–3

Details
- Draw: 32

Events
| Singles | men | women | | boys | girls |
| Doubles | men | women | mixed | boys | girls |
| WC Singles | men | women | quad |
| WC Doubles | men | women | quad |
| Legends | −45 | 45+ | women |
| ← 1997 · | French Open | · 1999 → |

José de Armas and Luis Horna were the defending champions, but Horna was unable to compete in Juniors as he turned 18 years old.

De Armas teamed up with Fernando González and successfully defended his title, by defeating Juan Carlos Ferrero and Feliciano López 6–7, 7–5, 6–3 in the final.

== Draw ==
=== Key ===
- Q = Qualifier
- WC = Wild card
- LL = Lucky loser
- Alt = Alternate
- SE = Special exempt
- PR = Protected ranking
- ITF = ITF entry
- JE = Junior exempt
- w/o = Walkover
- r = Retired
- d = Defaulted
- SR = Special ranking

=== Finals ===
Semifinals
(Venezuela) José de Armas (Chile) Fernando González | 6 | 6
(Austria) Philip Langer (Austria) Philipp Müllner | 0 | 2
(Czech Republic) Tomáš Cakl (Czech Republic) Jiří Vrbka | 7 | 4 | 4
(Spain) Juan Carlos Ferrero (Spain) Feliciano López | 5 | 6 | 6

Final
(Venezuela) José de Armas (Chile) Fernando González | 6 | 7 | 6
(Spain) Juan Carlos Ferrero (Spain) Feliciano López | 7 | 5 | 3

=== Top half ===
First round
(Venezuela) J de Armas (Chile) F González | 4 | 6 | 6
(Italy) F Aldi (Italy) F Volandri | 6 | 1 | 2
(Russia) A Derepasko (Canada) R Steckley | 1 | 6
(France) M Llodra (France) Julien Maes | 6 | 7
(Austria) J Melzer (Germany) Christian-Michael Straka | 3 | 1
(Argentina) I González King (Argentina) E Massa | 6 | 6
(France) É Prodon (France) François Vatin | 4 | 3
(Czech Republic) Ladislav Chramosta (Israel) A Ram | 6 | 6
(Pakistan) A Qureshi (Egypt) Marwan Zewar | 4 | 7 | 9
(Brazil) Eduardo Bergmann (Brazil) F Saretta | 6 | 5 | 7
(United States) KJ Hippensteel (United States) D Martin | 4 | 6 | 10
(France) JC Faurel (France) PH Mathieu | 6 | 2 | 12
(France) J Benneteau (France) Olivier Ramos | 7 | 6
(Denmark) Bob Borella (Denmark) K Pless | 6 | 3
(Austria) Philip Langer (Austria) Philipp Müllner | 7 | 6
(Slovakia) Miloslav Grolmus (Czech Republic) R Vik | 5 | 3

Second round
(Venezuela) J de Armas (Chile) F González | 7 | 6
(France) M Llodra (France) J Maes | 6 | 2
(Argentina) I González King (Argentina) E Massa | 0 | 4
(Czech Republic) L Chramosta (Israel) A Ram | 6 | 6
(Pakistan) A Qureshi (Egypt) M Zewar | 6 | 7
(France) JC Faurel (France) PH Mathieu | 1 | 6
(France) J Benneteau (France) O Ramos | 2 | 5
(Austria) P Langer (Austria) P Müllner | 6 | 7

Quarterfinals
(Venezuela) J de Armas (Chile) F González | 7 | 6
(Czech Republic) L Chramosta (Israel) A Ram | 5 | 4
(Pakistan) A Qureshi (Egypt) M Zewar | 6 | 3
(Austria) P Langer (Austria) P Müllner | 7 | 6

Semifinals
(Venezuela) J de Armas (Chile) F González | 6 | 6
(Austria) P Langer (Austria) P Müllner | 0 | 2

=== Bottom half ===
First round
(Australia) N Healey (Slovenia) A Kračman | 6 | 1 | 8
(Chinese Taipei) Cheng Wei-jen (Hungary) B Veress | 3 | 6 | 6
(France) T Ascione (France) Jacques Gley | 6 | 6
(Austria) A Fasching (Russia) I Kunitsyn | 1 | 4
(United Kingdom) S Dickson (United Kingdom) M Hilton | 3 | 6 | 11
(France) N Devilder (France) O Patience | 6 | 1 | 9
(United States) Simone Amorico (United States) S Berke | 7 | 5 | 2
(Czech Republic) T Cakl (Czech Republic) Jiří Vrbka | 5 | 7 | 6
(Thailand) Pracharapol Khamsaman (Thailand) D Udomchoke | 3 | 6 | 3
(Czech Republic) J Levinský (Ivory Coast) V Sanon | 6 | 2 | 6
(Switzerland) R Federer (Belgium) O Rochus | 1 | 3
(Spain) JC Ferrero (Spain) F López | 6 | 6
(Mexico) Jorge Haro (Croatia) L Zovko | 3 | 2
(Sweden) Johan Kareld (Sweden) A Vinciguerra | 6 | 6
(Argentina) Emiliano Redondi (Ecuador) David Wright | 2 | 3
(France) J Haehnel (France) J Jeanpierre | 6 | 6

Second round
(Australia) N Healey (Slovenia) A Kračman | 6 | 3 | 4
(France) T Ascione (France) J Gley | 4 | 6 | 6
(United Kingdom) S Dickson (United Kingdom) M Hilton | 1 | 3
(Czech Republic) T Cakl (Czech Republic) J Vrbka | 6 | 6
(Czech Republic) J Levinský (Ivory Coast) V Sanon | 4 | 4
(Spain) JC Ferrero (Spain) F López | 6 | 6
(Sweden) J Kareld (Sweden) A Vinciguerra | 7 | 7
(France) J Haehnel (France) J Jeanpierre | 6 | 6

Quarterfinals
(France) T Ascione (France) J Gley | 4 | 6 | 1
(Czech Republic) T Cakl (Czech Republic) J Vrbka | 6 | 1 | 6
(Spain) JC Ferrero (Spain) F López | 6 | 7
(Sweden) J Kareld (Sweden) A Vinciguerra | 4 | 5

Semifinals
(Czech Republic) T Cakl (Czech Republic) J Vrbka | 7 | 4 | 4
(Spain) JC Ferrero (Spain) F López | 5 | 6 | 6
