= Barbara Schett =

Austrian tennis player (born 1976)

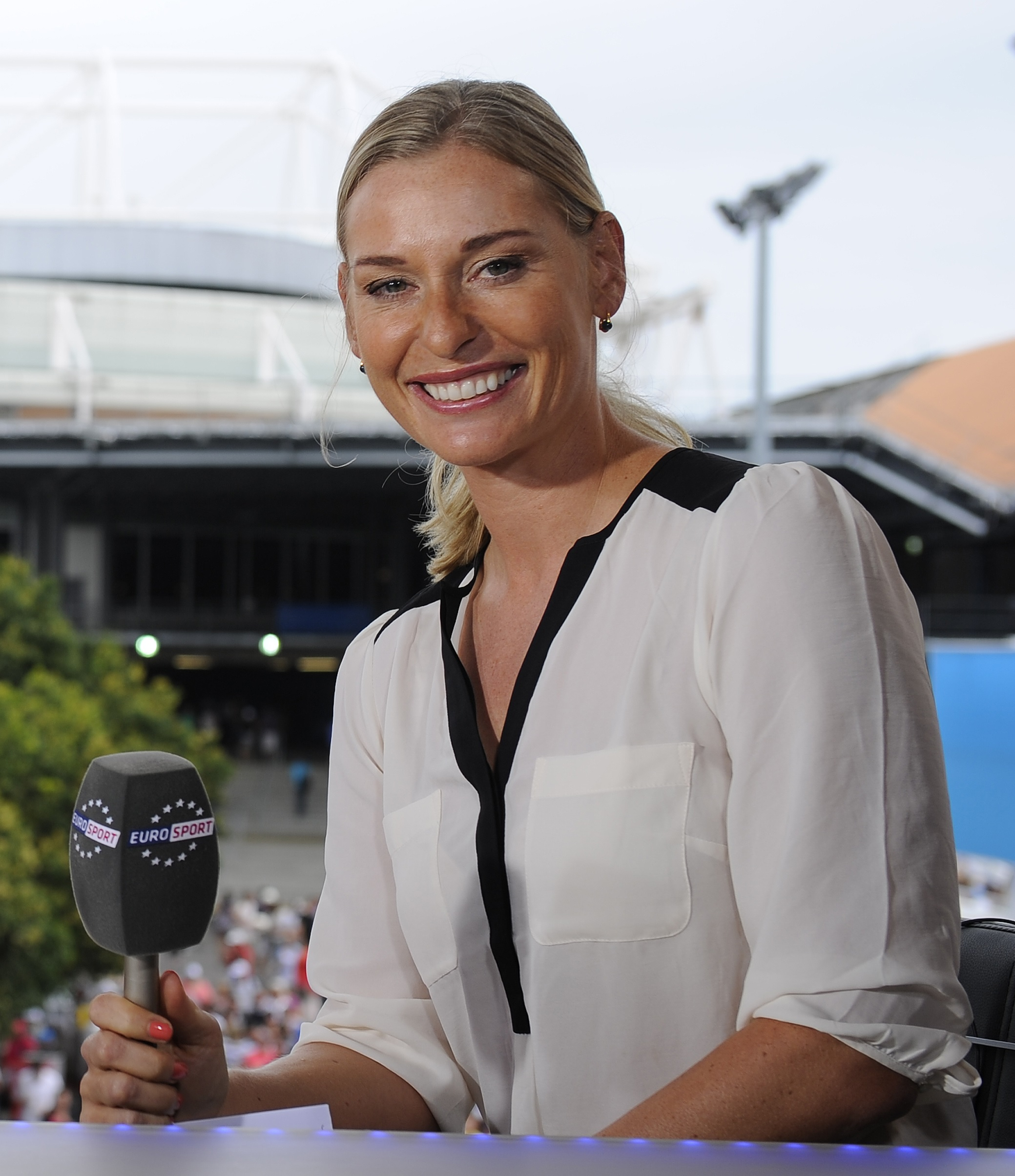
- Schett in 2014
- Full name: Barbara Schett Eagle
- Country (sports): Austria
- Born: 10 March 1976 (age 50) Innsbruck, Austria
- Height: 1.76 m (5 ft 9 in)
- Turned pro: 1992
- Retired: 2005
- Plays: Right-handed (two-handed backhand)
- Prize money: $3,109,510

Singles
- Career record: 349–279
- Career titles: 3
- Highest ranking: No. 7 (13 September 1999)

Grand Slam singles results
- Australian Open: 4R (1996, 1998, 1999, 2000)
- French Open: 4R (2000, 2001)
- Wimbledon: 4R (1999)
- US Open: QF (1999)

Other tournaments
- Grand Slam Cup: QF (1999)
- Tour Finals: QF (1999)
- Olympic Games: QF (2000)

Doubles
- Career record: 214–179
- Career titles: 10
- Highest ranking: No. 8 (15 January 2001)

Grand Slam doubles results
- Australian Open: SF (2000)
- French Open: QF (1998, 2000, 2001, 2003)
- Wimbledon: 4R (2000, 2002, 2004)
- US Open: SF (1999, 2004)

Other doubles tournaments
- Olympic Games: 1R (2000)

Mixed doubles
- Career record: 21–16

Grand Slam mixed doubles results
- Australian Open: F (2001)
- French Open: 2R (2002, 2003)
- Wimbledon: SF (2000)
- US Open: QF (2000)

Barbara Schett Eagle (German pronunciation: [ˈbaʁbaʁa ˈʃɛt]; born 10 March 1976) is an Austrian former professional tennis player, who reached her highest singles ranking of world No. 7 in September 1999. Between 1993 and 2004 she played in 48 matches for the Austria Fed Cup team, winning 30. She also represented Austria at the 2000 Sydney Olympics in singles and doubles, reaching the quarterfinals of the singles event. She retired after the 2005 Australian Open and now works for Eurosport as a commentator and presenter.

== Tennis career ==
=== 1991–1995 ===
Schett made her debut at the WTA Tour as a wildcard entrant for the tournament in Kitzbühel. She played mostly on the ITF Circuit, and won the ITF tournament in Zaragoza in 1992. In 1993, Schett broke into the top 200, and reached the quarterfinals at Kitzbühel and Montpellier. In Kitzbühel, Schett defeated world No. 17, Katerina Maleeva, in the third round, and lost in the quarterfinals to Judith Wiesner.

In 1994, Schett played her first Grand Slam tournament, qualifying at the Australian Open. She fell in the second round of qualifying. Schett reached her first semifinal on the WTA Tour at the Generali Ladies Linz, losing to Sabine Appelmans. She made her major debut at the French Open, but was defeated in the first round. On 4 April 1994, Schett broke into the top 100 at No. 99. The following year, she reached the semifinal of the Internazionali Femminili di Palermo and the quarterfinal of the ECM Prague Open, and also made her Fed Cup debut for Austria versus the United States.

=== 1996 ===
Having started the season playing at the Auckland Open, and the Sydney International, Schett reached the fourth round at the Australian Open, losing to German player Anke Huber. In the third round, she defeated Helena Suková.

The year's singles highlights of Schett include the quarterfinal of the Bausch & Lomb Championships in Amelia Island, her first title at the Palermo Ladies Open (victory over Sabine Hack), the first Tier I semifinal at the Kremlin Cup in Moscow, and the defeat over world No. 8, Magdalena Maleeva, at the Bausch & Lomb Championships. That was her first victory over a top-10 player. She also played for Austria in the Fed Cup versus Germany, losing her singles match to Steffi Graf. Schett also reached the semifinals of the Madrid Open (with Patty Schnyder), the Palermo title (with Janette Husárová) and the final of the Tier I Kremlin Cup (with Silvia Farina Elia, losing to the second seeds Natalia Medvedeva and Larisa Neiland). This was the first year that Schett finished as a top 50 player, at No. 38.

=== 1997 ===
She started the season with a loss in the first round at Auckland, and then lost at the Hobart International, also in the first round. She reached the third round of the Australian Open, losing to the fourth seed and eventual winner, Martina Hingis. Schett then made the chain of three consecutive first-round losses, at Paris, in Hanover and Indian Wells.

She then reached the fourth round of Miami Masters (lost to Iva Majoli in three sets, 2–6, 6–4, 2–6) and the third round in Hilton Head (lost to Martina Hingis with 3–6, 3–6). Schett reached the second round of Bausch & Lomb Championships (lost in the second round to Jana Novotná), the quarterfinals in Hamburg (lost to Ruxandra Dragomir), the second round of the Italian Open (lost to Monica Seles) and the second round of the German Open (lost to Arantxa Sánchez Vicario). Playing with Silvia Farina Elia, Schett reached the semifinals of the women's doubles tournament in Paris, and the quarterfinals of Hanover and Rome (Rome with Patty Schnyder). At the second Grand Slam tournament of the season, the French Open, Schett retired from her first-round match. Her next tournament was at Wimbledon where she lost in the second round to Magdalena Grzybowska (6–4, 3–6, 2–6).

Schett then reached her first consecutive final at Palermo, but lost to the second seed Sandrine Testud; also won the doubles title with Silvia Farina Elia. She then lost in the first round of J&S Cup in Warsaw to Virginia Ruano Pascual. Schett won her second tournament at the WTA Austria tournament in her native Austria, in Maria Lankowitz. She defeated Henrieta Nagyová in the final. She then made the chain of four consecutive second round losses, at the Atlanta tournament (lost to Sarah Pitkowski), US Open (lost to Kimberly Po), in Leipzig (lost to Iva Majoli) and in Filderstadt (lost to Anna Kournikova).

Schett finished the 1997 season at the Zurich Open. She retired from her match of the first round, played against Ai Sugiyama.

=== 1998 ===
Schett lost in the first round of the Auckland Open to Julie Halard-Decugis; then reached the quarterfinals of the Hobart International (lost to Patty Schnyder). She also reached the fourth round of the Australian Open, but was defeated by Conchita Martínez in straight sets, 6–3, 6–3. After losses in early phases of the tournaments (Open Gaz de France, Hanover, Indian Wells, Miami, Hilton Head and Amelia Island), Schett reached the semifinals in Hamburg; she lost to the first seed Martina Hingis. In Hamburg, she also captured the doubles title with Patty Schnyder.

Schett lost in the second round of both the Italian Open and the German Open, but then reached the semifinals of Mutua Madrileña (lost to Dominique van Roost). She lost to Adriana Gerši in the first round of French Open, and then to Venus Williams in the second round of Wimbledon Championships. Schett reached the quarterfinal of WTA Austria, losing to Emmanuelle Gagliardi. She then reached her fourth consecutive final at the Internazionali Femminili di Palermo, but was defeated by Patty Schnyder. In Boston, she played her second consecutive final, but lost to Mariaan de Swardt. After the first round losses at the Du Maurier Open and New Heaven Open, she lost to Amanda Coetzer in the third round of US Open.

Schett lost in the first round of Filderstadt to Anna Kournikova in three sets, 6–1, 4–6, 6–7^{(5)}. She then lost to Nathalie Tauziat in the quarterfinal the Zurich Open and to Monica Seles in the second round of the Kremlin Cup. She then lost in the second round of both Fortis Championships Luxembourg (lost to Ai Sugiyama) and Leipzig (lost to Anke Huber).

=== 1999–2005 ===
1999 – Schett's first top-10 finish, winning $725,865 (career-best) and scoring 47 tour singles wins (equal fourth on tour for season). Defeated world No. 9 Conchita Martínez and No. 4 Arantxa Sánchez Vicario en route to Sydney semifinal (lost to No. 2 Hingis 6–7 third set). Reached her first Tier I final at Moscow, and Grand Slam quarterfinal at the US Open. Broke into the top 10 at a career-high No. 7 following the US Open (13 September) and reached the semifinals at Auckland and Hamburg. Also qualified for the WTA Championships and Grand Slam Cup.

2000 – Won her third career singles title at Klagenfurt. Recorded victories over No. 5 seed Amanda Coetzer and No. 3 Nathalie Tauziat en route to Zurich semifinal. Reached six more quarterfinals, but also struggled with nagging injuries. She withdrew from Paris & Hanover in February with a stomach muscle injury, retired at Hamburg & withdrew from Strasbourg in May with a sinusitis infection and retired at Linz with an infected right toe.

2001 – Semifinalist at Doha (l. to Hingis) and quarterfinalist at Vienna and Moscow. First victory over a world No. 2 in six meetings, against Venus Williams at the French Open. Won the Sydney doubles title (with Kournikova), reaching a career-high No. 8 doubles ranking afterwards (15 January) then went on to the Australian Open as mixed doubles runner-up (with Eagle).

2002 – Seventh consecutive top-50 finish, reaching five quarterfinals, including the Canadian Open (with world No. 15 Rubin and No. 7 Clijsters, marking fourth time in her career she defeated two top-20 players in one tournament). Also won the Hamburg doubles (with Hingis). Otherwise, she obtained an invite from Hong Kong Tennis Patrons' Association to play the Hong Kong Ladies Challenge.

2003 – Apart from reaching the Madrid semifinal (first in more than two years), Gold Coast quarterfinal and Roland Garros 3rd round, she did not win consecutive matches all season. In doubles she won Paris (indoors, with Schnyder) and reached the Hobart final (with Wartusch). At the French Open, she suffered a 6–0, 6–0 defeat to defending champion Serena Williams.

2004 – As world No. 77 at Indian Wells, defeated world No. 13 Paola Suárez 6–3, 6–4 (first top-20 win in nearly 18 months) en route to the 4th round but lost to No. 20, C. Martinez. Quarterfinalist at Estoril and s'Hertogenbosch but failed to qualify at three Tour events. In doubles, she won titles at Paris [Indoors] (defended with Schnyder), Budapest (with Mandula) and Stockholm – her tenth career doubles title (with Molik). Also a finalist at Hobart (with Callens), and semi-finalist at 's-Hertogenbosch, Los Angeles, US Open (all with Schnyder) and Linz (with Wartusch). Member of the Austrian Fed Cup team that upset US team 4–1 in the quarterfinals to reach second semifinal in three years (second upset over the US in as many years. She handed Martina Navratilova her first Fed Cup loss after 30 singles/doubles victories dating back to 1975). Schett announced in October plans to retire following the 2005 Australian Open.

2005 – Played final professional event at Australian Open, picking up last victory with defeat of wildcard Welford in the first round. Fell to No. 26 seed Daniela Hantuchová, 4–6, 0–6 in the second round in her last professional singles match.

=== Career achievements ===
Barbara Schett won a total of 13 WTA Tour tournaments, three in the singles category and ten in doubles. She has also won one ITF tournament. In 1999, she qualified for the season ending WTA Tour Championships reaching the quarterfinals and was named the Most Improved Player by TENNIS Magazine.

== Personal life ==
Schett is married to former Australian tennis player Joshua Eagle. On 28 April 2009, Schett gave birth to a son.

== Career statistics ==
=== Grand Slam performance timelines ===
Key
W	F	SF	QF	#R	RR	Q#	DNQ	A	NH

(W) winner; (F) finalist; (SF) semifinalist; (QF) quarterfinalist; (#R) rounds 4, 3, 2, 1; (RR) round-robin stage; (Q#) qualification round; (DNQ) did not qualify; (A) absent; (NH) not held; (SR) strike rate (events won / competed); (W–L) win–loss record.

==== Singles ====
Tournament	1994	1995	1996	1997	1998	1999	2000	2001	2002	2003	2004	2005	SR	W–L	Win%
Australian Open	Q2	1R	4R	3R	4R	4R	4R	3R	3R	1R	2R	2R	0 / 11	20–11	65%
French Open	1R	1R	1R	1R	1R	3R	4R	4R	2R	3R	1R	A	0 / 11	11–11	50%
Wimbledon	1R	A	2R	2R	2R	4R	1R	3R	2R	2R	1R	A	0 / 10	10–10	50%
US Open	1R	1R	2R	2R	3R	QF	2R	4R	2R	2R	1R	A	0 / 11	14–11	56%
Overall win–loss	0–3	0–3	5–4	4–4	6–4	12–4	7–4	10–4	5–4	4–4	1–4	1–1	0 / 43	55–43	56%
