= Christophe Van Garsse =

Belgian tennis player

- Country (sports): Belgium
- Born: 21 June 1974 (age 51); Tongeren, Belgium
- Height: 1.85 m (6 ft 1 in)
- Turned pro: 1992
- Plays: Left-handed
- Prize money: $249,730

Singles
- Career record: 21–16
- Career titles: 0
- Highest ranking: No. 131 (8 June 1998)

Grand Slam singles results
- Australian Open: 2R (1998)
- French Open: 3R (1998)
- Wimbledon: 3R (1997)

Doubles
- Career record: 0–1

Christophe Van Garsse (born 21 June 1974) is a former professional tennis player from Belgium.

Van Garsse competed in four Grand Slams during his career, including two Wimbledon Championships. He only once failed to get past first round and twice made it into the third round, at Wimbledon in 1997, where he was eliminated by Patrick Rafter and the 1998 French Open, where he lost to Thomas Muster.

He was a semi-finalist at the San Marino Open in 1994, defeating world number 27 Magnus Larsson and fifth seed Renzo Furlan. His next best result on the ATP Tour was when he made the quarter-finals of the 1997 Bournemouth International.

In the Davis Cup, Van Garsse had a 6–4 record in singles and lost the only doubles match he took part in. He twice won decisive fifth rubber for Belgium. The first was in 1997 when he defeated Lionel Roux of France and the other was a five setter against Sjeng Schalken in Belgium's 1998 World Group encounter with the Netherlands. He was a member of the Belgian team which made the semi-finals in 1999. In the quarter-finals, Van Garsse had a win over a young Roger Federer and in the semi-finals he defeated Cédric Pioline, but France would win their other four rubbers.

== Challenger titles ==
=== Singles: (2) ===
No.	Year	Tournament	Surface	Opponent	Score
1.	1994	Nagoya, Japan	Hard	(India) Leander Paes	6–4, 6–3
2.	1997	Portschach, Austria	Clay	(France) Jean-Baptiste Perlant	7–5, 6–1
