= Jordi Mas =

Spanish tennis player (born 1971)

- Country (sports): Spain
- Born: 31 October 1971 (age 53)
- Plays: Right-handed
- Prize money: $61,274

Singles
- Career record: 1-3
- Career titles: 0
- Highest ranking: No. 199 (5 Oct 1998)

Grand Slam singles results
- French Open: 2R (1998)

Doubles
- Career record: 0-1
- Career titles: 0
- Highest ranking: No. 201 (24 Nov 1997)

Jordi Mas-Rodriguez (born 31 October 1971) is a former professional tennis player from Spain.

== Career ==
Mas made the second round of the 1998 French Open, beating American Michael Sell, before exiting the tournament at the hands of Johan Van Herck.

His only other singles appearances on the ATP Tour were at Florence in 1992 and Barcelona in 1993. He also played in the doubles at the 1994 Austrian Open with Emilio Benfele Álvarez.

== Challenger titles ==
=== Singles: (1) ===
No.	Year	Tournament	Surface	Opponent in the final	Score in the final
1.	1998	(North Macedonia) Skopje, Macedonia	Clay	(Germany) Tomas Behrend	6–3, 6–4

=== Doubles: (1) ===
No.	Year	Tournament	Surface	Partner	Opponents in the final	Score in the final
1.	1997	Oberstaufen, Germany	Clay	(Spain) Juan Ignacio Carrasco	(Austria) Georg Blumauer (Italy) Andrea Gaudenzi	6–2, 7–6
