= Pepe Imaz =

Spanish tennis player and coach

Jose Imaz-Ruiz
- Country (sports): Spain
- Born: 30 May 1974 (age 52) Arnedo, Spain
- Height: 1.78 m (5 ft 10 in)
- Turned pro: 1995
- Plays: Right-handed
- Prize money: $114,053

Singles
- Career record: 3-6
- Career titles: 0
- Highest ranking: No. 146 (11 May 1998)

Grand Slam singles results
- French Open: 2R (1998)
- Wimbledon: Q1 (1994)

Doubles
- Career record: 2-6
- Career titles: 0
- Highest ranking: No. 167 (22 Apr 1996)

José "Pepe" Imaz Ruiz (born 30 May 1974 in Arnedo) is a tennis coach and former professional tennis player from Spain.

== Playing career ==
Imaz made his debut on the ATP Tour at the 1995 Austrian Open. He lost to Sergi Bruguera in the second round, having earlier beaten Christian Miniussi.

In 1996, he took part in the qualifying rounds of the French Open, where he was defeated in the first round by Corrado Borroni.

His most noteworthy performance came in the 1998 French Open, the only Grand Slam of his career. The Spaniard had a five set opening round win over Jean-Baptiste Perlant. He then lost in straight sets to eventual champion Carlos Moyá, but would come close to winning the second set tiebreak, which lasted for 30 points, and in which he blew several set points.

== Coaching career ==
Imaz’s tennis school is now based entirely at the International Tennis Club, having relocated from Marbella’s Puente Romano resort.

The school preaches a philosophy of Amor y Paz (Love and Peace) as the overriding factors when coaching tennis, in which he uses meditation and the power of lengthy hugs.

In 2013, Marko Djokovic worked with Pepe Imaz to address symptoms of depression, experiencing a positive personal change. Following this, Novak Djokovic initiated contact with Imaz, marking the beginning of their professional relationship.

Imaz began working with Novak Djokovic during the 2013–2014 period as part of his support team, contributing in a mental and emotional capacity. He was present within Djokovic’s team during key moments, including the period leading up to and including Djokovic’s victory at the French Open in 2016.

His involvement spanned major tournaments such as ATP Masters events and Grand Slam competitions, including matches against players such as Roger Federer.

Djokovic continued his professional association with Imaz beyond 2018, with Pepe Imaz maintaining meetings with him until approximately 2021–2022.

== Other activities and works ==
In addition to his work as a tennis coach, Imaz works with elite athletes in a mental and emotional support capacity, focusing on areas such as well-being, mindfulness, and performance under pressure. His work extends beyond sport to include entrepreneurs, organizations, and sports federations.

He has delivered lectures and workshops internationally on emotional awareness and its role in competition and everyday life. Imaz is also the author of The Art of Training Your Mind, a book that explores the importance of emotions in both athletic performance and personal development.

He has collaborated with Royal Spanish Tennis Federation in developing educational initiatives, including courses aimed at coaches, players, and parents on emotional management in sport. In addition, he co-founded, together with Marko Djokovic, the “Love & Peace and Friends” event, a multi-day gathering focused on fostering understanding of emotions in competitive environments.

In 2024, Imaz was named an ambassador of Logroño, the capital of the autonomous community of La Rioja. This role was referenced in official municipal communications and regional media coverage.

== ATP Challenger Tour finals ==
=== Doubles: (2-3) ===
Result	No.	Year	Tournament	Surface	Partner	Opponents	Score
Win	1.	1993	Seville, Spain	Clay	(Spain) Emilio Benfele Álvarez	(United States) Steve Campbell (United States) John Yancey	6–7, 6–1, 6–2
Win	2.	1994	Seville, Spain	Clay	(Spain) Emilio Benfele Álvarez	(Germany) Patrick Baur (Germany) Torben Theine	6–1, 6–3
Loss	1.	1995	Scheveningen, Netherlands	Clay	(Spain) Emilio Benfele Álvarez	(Israel) Eyal Ran (Romania) Andrei Pavel	4–6, 4–6
Loss	2.	1995	Graz, Austria	Clay	(Spain) Emilio Benfele Álvarez	(Argentina) Pablo Albano (Czech Republic) Vojtěch Flégl	4–6, 3–6
Loss	3.	1997	Seville, Spain	Clay	(Spain) Emilio Benfele Álvarez	(Finland) Tuomas Ketola (Germany) Michael Kohlmann	6–4, 1–6, 3–6
