= Julia Sell =

American tennis coach

Biographical details
- Born: Marietta, Georgia, U.S.

Playing career
- 2000–2003: Florida

Coaching career (HC unless noted)
- 2007: Harvard (assistant)
- 2008–2011: Notre Dame (assistant)
- 2012–2014: LSU
- 2015–2022: LSU (co-HC)

Julia Sell is American tennis coach. She was the co-head coach of the LSU Lady Tigers tennis team at Louisiana State University with Michael Sell from 2015 to 2022. She was originally hired by LSU as the lone head coach of the women's tennis team in 2012.

== Coaching career ==
Prior to her stint at the USTA, Sell was an assistant coach at the University of Notre Dame from 2008 to 2011. During her time at Notre Dame, she helped guide the women's tennis team to back-to-back NCAA Championship semifinal appearances in 2009 and 2010.

Also in 2008, Sell was one of two coaches for the USTA Summer Collegiate team, which serves as an elite training program for the top American collegiate tennis players. She got her start in coaching in 2007 as an assistant at Harvard University.

== Playing career ==
Sell is a 2003 graduate of the University of Florida having served as team captain for the Gators from 2000 to 2003 and played the #1 singles position for the 2003 National Championship team. During her time in Gainesville, Florida won a national championship, two Southeastern conference championships, and three SEC tournament championships and finished as the NCAA runner-up and National Team Indoor runner-up. She received the SEC Outstanding Senior award and was named the ITA South Region Player of the Year as a senior in 2003. She achieved a career-high ITA singles ranking of 24th and 7th in doubles.
