= José de Armas =

Venezuelan tennis player (born 1981)

- Country (sports): Venezuela
- Residence: Caracas, Venezuela
- Born: March 25, 1981 (age 44); Florida, United States
- Turned pro: 1999
- Plays: Right-handed
- Prize money: US$ 134,800

Singles
- Career record: 17–17
- Career titles: 0
- Highest ranking: No. 236 (19 May 2003)

Grand Slam singles results
- French Open: Q1 (2003)
- Wimbledon: Q1 (2009)
- US Open: Q2 (2000)

Doubles
- Career record: 12–13
- Career titles: 0
- Highest ranking: No. 231 (14 August 2000)
- Last updated on: 21 September 2021.

José de Armas (born March 25, 1981, in Florida) is a Venezuelan former professional tennis player.

De Armas reached a career high ATP singles ranking of World No. 236, achieved on 19 May 2003. Additionally he reached a career high ATP doubles ranking of World No. 231, achieved on 14 August 2000.

== Juniors ==
During his time as a junior, De Armas achieved doubles success on clay, and would go on to win the Junior Boys' Doubles championships at the French Open in both 1997 and 1998.

== Junior Grand Slam finals ==
=== Doubles: 2 (2 titles) ===
Result	Year	Tournament	Surface	Partnet	Opponents	Score
Win	1997	French Open	Clay	(Peru) Luis Horna	(France) Arnaud Di Pasquale (France) Julien Jeanpierre	6–4, 2–6, 7–5
Win	1998	French Open	Clay	(Chile) Fernando González	(Spain) Juan Carlos Ferrero (Spain) Feliciano López	6–7, 7–5, 6–3

== ATP Challenger and ITF Futures finals ==
=== Singles: 32 (22–10) ===
Legend ATP Challenger (0–1) ITF Futures (22–9)	Finals by surface Hard (14–7) Clay (8–3) Grass (0–0) Carpet (0–0)

Result	W–L	Date	Tournament	Tier	Surface	Opponent	Score
Win	1–0	Oct 1999	Mexico F5, Playa del Carmen	Futures	Hard	(Mexico) Marco Osorio	6–3, 2–0 ret.
Win	2–0	May 2000	USA F12, Vero Beach	Futures	Clay	(Australia) Lee Pearson	6–3, 7–6^{(7–1)}
Loss	2–1	Jun 2000	Mexico F4, Cozumel	Futures	Hard	(United States) Jack Brasington	3–6, 2–6
Loss	2–2	Nov 2000	USA F28, Malibu	Futures	Hard	(Russia) Dmitry Tursunov	2–6, 1–6
Win	3–2	Feb 2001	Mexico F2, Cancún	Futures	Hard	(Morocco) Mehdi Tahiri	6–7^{(6–8)}, 6–3, 6–2
Loss	3–3	May 2001	USA F12, Hallandale Beach	Futures	Clay	(Peru) Iván Miranda	1–6, 6–3, 6–7^{(7–9)}
Loss	3–4	Oct 2001	Dominican Republic F1, Santo Domingo	Futures	Clay	(Germany) Denis Gremelmayr	4–6, 0–6
Win	4–4	May 2002	USA F12, Tampa	Futures	Clay	(Canada) Frank Dancevic	7–6^{(8–6)}, 5–7, 6–4
Win	5–4	Jun 2002	Venezuela F1, Barquisimeto	Futures	Hard	(United States) Brandon Hawk	3–6, 6–4, 6–2
Win	6–4	Jul 2002	Venezuela F2, Maracaibo	Futures	Hard	(Colombia) Michael Quintero Aguilar	1–6, 6–0, 6–3
Loss	6–5	Sep 2003	Gramado, Brazil	Challenger	Hard	(Brazil) Marcos Daniel	5–7, 5–7
Win	7–5	May 2004	USA F10, Vero Beach	Futures	Clay	(Netherlands) Melvyn op der Heijde	6–7^{(4–7)}, 7–6^{(7–3)}, 6–3
Loss	7–6	Oct 2004	Venezuela F2, Caracas	Futures	Hard	(Netherlands Antilles) Jean-Julien Rojer	1–6, 3–6
Loss	7–7	Oct 2004	Venezuela F3, Caracas	Futures	Hard	(Netherlands Antilles) Jean-Julien Rojer	4–6, 2–6
Win	8–7	Jan 2005	USA F2, Kissimmee	Futures	Hard	(United States) Alex Kuznetsov	6–1, 6–4
Win	9–7	May 2005	USA F10, Orange Park	Futures	Clay	(United States) Alex Kuznetsov	6–4, 7–5
Win	10–7	May 2005	USA F11, Tampa	Futures	Clay	(Italy) Diego Álvarez	2–6, 6–3, 7–5
Win	11–7	Jun 2005	USA F12, Woodland	Futures	Hard	(Peru) Iván Miranda	4–6, 6–4, 6–1
Win	12–7	Nov 2007	Venezuela F8, Maracay	Futures	Hard	(Venezuela) Roberto Maytín	6–2, 7–5
Loss	12–8	May 2008	USA F9, Vero Beach	Futures	Clay	(United States) Chase Buchanan	6–4, 5–7, 6–7^{(2–7)}
Win	13–8	Jun 2008	Venezuela F1, Maracay	Futures	Hard	(Venezuela) Román Recarte	3–6, 6–4, 7–5
Win	14–8	Jun 2008	Venezuela F3, Valencia	Futures	Hard	(Ecuador) Julio César Campozano	6–7^{(5–7)}, 6–0, 6–3
Win	15–8	Jul 2008	Venezuela F4, Maracaibo	Futures	Hard	(Venezuela) Piero Luisi	6–3, 0–6, 6–3
Win	16–8	Aug 2008	Venezuela F5, Valencia	Futures	Hard	(United States) Brett Ross	6–4, 6–3
Loss	16–9	Sep 2008	USA F24, Irvine	Futures	Hard	(Germany) Tobias Clemens	4–6, 4–6
Win	17–9	Oct 2008	Venezuela F7, Barquisimeto	Futures	Clay	(Ecuador) Julio César Campozano	6–3, 6–1
Win	18–9	Oct 2008	Venezuela F8, Valencia	Futures	Hard	(Ecuador) Julio César Campozano	6–1, 6–3
Win	19–9	Oct 2008	Venezuela F9, Caracas	Futures	Hard	(Venezuela) Piero Luisi	6–4, 7–6^{(8–6)}
Win	20–9	Jan 2009	USA F1, Boca Raton	Futures	Clay	(Romania) Gabriel Moraru	7–5, 6–3
Win	21–9	May 2009	Venezuela F3, Maracaibo	Futures	Hard	(Colombia) Alejandro González	7–5, 6–3
Win	22–9	Oct 2009	Venezuela F7, Barquisimeto	Futures	Clay	(Colombia) Eduardo Struvay	6–4, 5–7, 6–1
Loss	22–10	Oct 2009	Venezuela F8, Caracas	Futures	Hard	(Venezuela) Piero Luisi	6–1, 5–7, 4–6

=== Doubles: 14 (10–4) ===
Legend ATP Challenger (1–3) ITF Futures (9–1)	Finals by surface Hard (5–1) Clay (5–3) Grass (0–0) Carpet (0–0)

Result	W–L	Date	Tournament	Tier	Surface	Partner	Opponents	Score
Win	1–0	Oct 1999	Mexico F6, Chihuahua	Futures	Hard	(Mexico) Daniel Langre	(Mexico) Luis Uribe (Lebanon) Jicham Zaatini	7–5, 6–7, 7–6
Loss	1–1	Dec 1999	Caracas, Venezuela	Challenger	Clay	(Venezuela) Jimy Szymanski	(Argentina) Gastón Etlis (Argentina) Martín Rodríguez	4–6, 3–6
Win	2–1	Apr 2000	San Luis Potosí, Mexico	Challenger	Clay	(Venezuela) Jimy Szymanski	(Canada) Jocelyn Robichaud (United States) Michael Sell	5–7, 6–4, 6–2
Loss	2–2	May 2000	USA F12, Vero Beach	Futures	Clay	(United States) Diego Ayala	(United States) Levar Harper-Griffith (Russia) Dmitry Tursunov	3–6, 4–6
Win	3–2	Nov 2000	USA F28, Malibu	Futures	Hard	(Netherlands) Djalmar Sistermans	(Monaco) Sebastien Graeff (Australia) Anthony Ross	7–6^{(9–7)}, 6–4
Win	4–2	May 2001	USA F12, Hallandale Beach	Futures	Clay	(Venezuela) Nicolás Pereira	(United States) Steve Berke (United States) Kyle Porter	6–4, 2–6, 6–2
Loss	4–3	Jul 2001	Campinas, Brazil	Challenger	Clay	(Brazil) Flávio Saretta	(Argentina) Edgardo Massa (Argentina) Leonardo Olguín	7–6^{(8–6)}, 2–6, 5–7
Win	5–3	Oct 2001	Venezuela F1, Caracas	Futures	Clay	(Ecuador) Giovanni Lapentti	(Croatia) Ivan Cinkus (Hungary) Gergely Kisgyörgy	walkover
Win	6–3	Nov 2001	Venezuela F2, Caracas	Futures	Clay	(Ecuador) Giovanni Lapentti	(Spain) Antonio Baldellou-Esteva (Spain) David Cors-Pares	6–4, 6–3
Win	7–3	Oct 2002	Mexico F15, Obregón	Futures	Hard	(Argentina) Ignacio González King	(Brazil) Pedro Braga (Brazil) Ronaldo Carvalho	5–7, 7–5, 6–2
Win	8–3	Nov 2002	Mexico F16, Juárez	Futures	Clay	(Argentina) Ignacio González King	(Mexico) Bruno Echagaray (Mexico) Santiago González	7–5, 6–3
Loss	8–4	Apr 2004	Salinas, Ecuador	Challenger	Hard	(United States) Eric Nunez	(Argentina) Federico Browne (Pakistan) Aisam Qureshi	3–6, 3–6
Win	9–4	Oct 2007	Venezuela F5, Caracas	Futures	Hard	(Venezuela) Jimy Szymanski	(Venezuela) Piero Luisi (Venezuela) Roberto Maytín	6–7^{(5–7)}, 7–6^{(8–6)}, [10–1]
Win	10–4	Nov 2007	Venezuela F7, Caracas	Futures	Hard	(Venezuela) Jimy Szymanski	(Venezuela) Miguel Cicenia (Venezuela) Luis David Martinez	7–6^{(9–7)}, 7–6^{(7–4)}
