= Artem Derepasko =

Russian tennis player

- Country (sports): Russia
- Born: 26 January 1980 (age 46) Ufa, Russia
- Plays: Right-handed
- Prize money: $95,261

Singles
- Career record: 0–2
- Career titles: 0
- Highest ranking: No. 189 (25 Feb 2002)

Grand Slam singles results
- Wimbledon: 1R (2001)

Doubles
- Career record: 0–2
- Career titles: 0
- Highest ranking: No. 189 (26 Aug 2002)

Artem Derepasko (Russian: Артём Дерепаско; born 26 January 1980) is a former professional tennis player from Russia.

== Career ==
Derepasko was a quarter-finalist at the Orange Bowl in 1998. Four years earlier he had won in the '14 and Under' category, defeating Fernando González in the final. Also in 1998 he made the boys' singles semi-finals in the French Open and was a losing finalist at the Casablanca Cup.

He made his ATP Tour debut at the 1999 Kremlin Cup, where he was beaten in the opening round by Sargis Sargsian. The Russian took part in the 2001 Wimbledon Championships, losing in the first round to sixth seed Tim Henman.

With partner Mariya Goloviznina, Derepasko was a gold medalist in the mixed doubles at the 2003 Summer Universiade in Daegu.
