= 1998 French Open – Men's doubles =

Men's doubles
- 1998 French Open

Final
- Champion: (Netherlands) Jacco Eltingh (Netherlands) Paul Haarhuis
- Runner-up: (The Bahamas) Mark Knowles (Canada) Daniel Nestor
- Score: 6–3, 3–6, 6–3

Details
- Draw: 64
- Seeds: 16

Events
Singles	men	women		boys	girls
Doubles	men	women	mixed	boys	girls
WC Singles	men	women	quad
WC Doubles	men	women	quad
Legends	−45	45+	women
← 1997 ·	French Open	· 1999 →

The 1998 French Open was a tennis tournament that took place on the outdoor clay courts at the Stade Roland Garros in Paris, France. The tournament was held from 25 May until 7 June. It was the 97th staging of the French Open, and the second Grand Slam tennis event of 1998.

Yevgeny Kafelnikov and Daniel Vacek were the defending champions, but lost in the second round to Jordi Burillo and Marc-Kevin Goellner.

Jacco Eltingh and Paul Haarhuis won the title by defeating Mark Knowles and Daniel Nestor 6–3, 3–6, 6–3 in the final.

== Seeds ==
Champion seeds are indicated in bold text while text in italics indicates the round in which those seeds were eliminated.

1. (Netherlands) **Jacco Eltingh** / (Netherlands) **Paul Haarhuis (champions)**
2. (Australia) Todd Woodbridge / (Australia) Mark Woodforde (third round)
3. (India) Mahesh Bhupathi / (India) Leander Paes (semifinals)
4. (Russia) Yevgeny Kafelnikov / (Czech Republic) Daniel Vacek (second round)
5. (South Africa) Ellis Ferreira / (United States) Rick Leach (first round)
6. (Sweden) Jonas Björkman / (Australia) Patrick Rafter (semifinals)
7. (United States) Donald Johnson / (United States) Francisco Montana (quarterfinals)
8. (United States) Alex O'Brien / (United States) Jonathan Stark (first round)
9. (United States) Jim Grabb / (Australia) David Macpherson (third round)
10. (United States) Patrick Galbraith / (New Zealand) Brett Steven (quarterfinals)
11. (Australia) Joshua Eagle / (Australia) Andrew Florent (third round)
12. (Zimbabwe) Wayne Black / (Canada) Sébastien Lareau (third round)
13. (Spain) Tomás Carbonell / (Spain) Francisco Roig (second round)
14. (Argentina) Luis Lobo / (Spain) Javier Sánchez (second round)
15. (Sweden) Nicklas Kulti / (Sweden) Mikael Tillström (first round)
16. (United Kingdom) Neil Broad / (South Africa) Piet Norval (first round)

== Draw ==
=== Key ===
- Q = Qualifier
- WC = Wild card
- LL = Lucky loser
- Alt = Alternate
- ITF = ITF entry
- PR = Protected ranking
- SR = Special ranking
- SE = Special exempt
- JE = Junior exempt
- JR = Junior Accelerator Programme entrant
- CO = College Accelerator Programme entrant
- NG = Next Gen Accelerator Program entrant
- w/o = Walkover
- r = Retired
- d = Defaulted

=== Finals ===
Quarterfinals
1	(Netherlands) Jacco Eltingh (Netherlands) Paul Haarhuis	6	6
7	(United States) Donald Johnson (United States) Francisco Montana	3	2
(Brazil) Gustavo Kuerten (Brazil) Fernando Meligeni	6^{5}d
6	(Sweden) Jonas Björkman (Australia) Patrick Rafter	7
(Spain) Julián Alonso (Ecuador) Nicolás Lapentti	3	4
3	(India) Mahesh Bhupathi (India) Leander Paes	6	6
10	(United States) Patrick Galbraith (New Zealand) Brett Steven	3	4
(The Bahamas) Mark Knowles (Canada) Daniel Nestor	6	6

Semifinals
1	(Netherlands) Jacco Eltingh (Netherlands) Paul Haarhuis	6	6
6	(Sweden) Jonas Björkman (Australia) Patrick Rafter	2	2
(The Bahamas) Mark Knowles (Canada) Daniel Nestor	6	7
3	(India) Mahesh Bhupathi (India) Leander Paes	1	6^{6}

Final
1	(Netherlands) Jacco Eltingh (Netherlands) Paul Haarhuis	6	3	6
(The Bahamas) Mark Knowles (Canada) Daniel Nestor	3	6	3

=== Top half ===
==== Section 1 ====
First round
1	(Netherlands) J Eltingh (Netherlands) P Haarhuis	6	6
(Australia) W Arthurs (Australia) A Kratzmann	3	4
(Russia) A Olhovskiy (Germany) D Prinosil	3	7	6
(Croatia) G Ivanišević (Australia) M Philippoussis	6	6^{2}	2
(Czech Republic) J Novák (Czech Republic) D Rikl	1	7	6
(South Africa) M Barnard (South Africa) B Haygarth	6	6^{6}	2
(Germany) K Braasch (Germany) J Knippschild	6	6
16	(United Kingdom) N Broad (South Africa) P Norval	4	1
9	(United States) J Grabb (Australia) D Macpherson	6	7
(France) J Boutter (France) J-M Péquery	3	6^{4}
(South Africa) J-L de Jager (South Africa) R Koenig	5	7	6
(Argentina) P Albano (Argentina) M Puerta	7	6^{4}	3
(South Africa) G Stafford (Zimbabwe) K Ullyett	6	6
(South Africa) D Adams (Czech Republic) C Doseděl	4	2
7	(United States) D Johnson (United States) F Montana	6	6
(Netherlands) T Kempers (Netherlands) M Oosting	1	1

Second round
1	(Netherlands) J Eltingh (Netherlands) P Haarhuis	6	6
(Russia) A Olhovskiy (Germany) D Prinosil	2	3
(Czech Republic) J Novák (Czech Republic) D Rikl	6^{8}	6	4
(Germany) K Braasch (Germany) J Knippschild	7	1	6
9	(United States) J Grabb (Australia) D Macpherson	6	4	6
(South Africa) J-L de Jager (South Africa) R Koenig	3	6	3
(South Africa) G Stafford (Zimbabwe) K Ullyett	6	3	4
7	(United States) D Johnson (United States) F Montana	2	6	6

Third round
1	(Netherlands) J Eltingh (Netherlands) P Haarhuis	6	6
(Germany) K Braasch (Germany) J Knippschild	1	4
9	(United States) J Grabb (Australia) D Macpherson	5	3
7	(United States) D Johnson (United States) F Montana	7	6

Quarterfinals
1	(Netherlands) J Eltingh (Netherlands) P Haarhuis	6	6
7	(United States) D Johnson (United States) F Montana	3	2

==== Section 2 ====
First round
4	(Russia) Y Kafelnikov (Czech Republic) D Vacek	4	6	6
(Belgium) L Pimek (Czech Republic) P Vízner	6	3	4
(Spain) J Burillo (Germany) M-K Goellner	6	3	6
(United States) D Bowen (Mexico) D Roditi	4	6	1
(Brazil) G Kuerten (Brazil) F Meligeni	6	6
(Brazil) N Aerts (Brazil) A Sá	3	2
13	(Spain) T Carbonell (Spain) F Roig	6	6^{3}	6
(Australia) S Stolle (Czech Republic) C Suk	2	7	1
11	(Australia) J Eagle (Australia) A Florent	4	6	6
(France) R Gilbert (France) S Simian	6	1	4
(United States) B Coupe (Netherlands) S Noteboom	6	7
(France) N Escudé (France) G Raoux	2	6^{1}
(Spain) A Martín (Czech Republic) T Anzari	7	6
(Netherlands) S Groen (Italy) V Santopadre	6^{8}	2
6	(Sweden) J Björkman (Australia) P Rafter	3	7	6
(United States) J Gimelstob (United States) B MacPhie	6	6^{1}	4

Second round
4	(Russia) Y Kafelnikov (Czech Republic) D Vacek	3	7	4
(Spain) J Burillo (Germany) M-K Goellner	6	6^{0}	6
(Brazil) G Kuerten (Brazil) F Meligeni	7	7
13	(Spain) T Carbonell (Spain) F Roig	6^{5}	5
11	(Australia) J Eagle (Australia) A Florent	6	6
(United States) B Coupe (Netherlands) S Noteboom	4	;4
(Spain) A Martín (Czech Republic) T Anzari	4	2
6	(Sweden) J Björkman (Australia) P Rafter	6	6

Third round
(Spain) J Burillo (Germany) M-K Goellner	2	6	4
(Brazil) G Kuerten (Brazil) F Meligeni	6	4	6
11	(Australia) J Eagle (Australia) A Florent	5	7	5
6	(Sweden) J Björkman (Australia) P Rafter	7	6^{2}	7

Quarterfinals
(Brazil) G Kuerten (Brazil) F Meligeni	6^{5}d
6	(Sweden) J Björkman (Australia) P Rafter	7

=== Bottom half ===
==== Section 3 ====
First round
(Spain) J Alonso (Ecuador) N Lapentti	7	5	6
5	(South Africa) E Ferreira (United States) R Leach	6^{2}	7	4
(United Kingdom) D Sapsford (United Kingdom) C Wilkinson	6	6
(France) A Di Pasquale (France) J Jeanpierre	1	1
(United States) D DiLucia (United States) M Keil	6	6
(Argentina) L Arnold (Argentina) D Orsanic	1	3
12	(Zimbabwe) W Black (Canada) S Lareau	6	6
(France) O Delaître (France) S Grosjean	1	1
14	(Argentina) L Lobo (Spain) J Sánchez	4	6	6
(France) G Forget (France) R Lavergne	6	3	2
(Sweden) F Bergh (Sweden) P Nyborg	6	6^{2}	6
(United States) G Grant (Australia) M Tebbutt	0	7	2
(South Africa) N Godwin (Finland) T Ketola	6	6
(Italy) C Brandi (Italy) F Messori	3	4
3	(India) M Bhupathi (India) L Paes	7	3	6
(United States) D Randall (United States) G Van Emburgh	6^{2}	6	3

Second round
(Spain) J Alonso (Ecuador) N Lapentti	6	6
(United Kingdom) D Sapsford (United Kingdom) C Wilkinson	4	4
(United States) D DiLucia (United States) M Keil	6	5	3
12	(Zimbabwe) W Black (Canada) S Lareau	4	7	6
14	(Argentina) L Lobo (Spain) J Sánchez	2	6^{5}
(Sweden) F Bergh (Sweden) P Nyborg	6	7
(South Africa) N Godwin (Finland) T Ketola	3	6^{2}
3	(India) M Bhupathi (India) L Paes	6	7

Third round
(Spain) J Alonso (Ecuador) N Lapentti	6	6^{3}	6
12	(Zimbabwe) W Black (Canada) S Lareau	4	7	2
(Sweden) F Bergh (Sweden) P Nyborg	4	6^{8}
3	(India) M Bhupathi (India) L Paes	6	7

Quarterfinals
(Spain) J Alonso (Ecuador) N Lapentti	3	4
3	(India) M Bhupathi (India) L Paes	6	6

==== Section 4 ====
First round
(Argentina) M Hood (Argentina) S Prieto	6	6
8	(United States) A O'Brien (United States) J Stark	2	4
(Australia) P Kilderry (United States) K Kinnear	7	6
(United States) L Jensen (United States) M Jensen	6^{4}	2
(North Macedonia) A Kitinov (Belgium) T Vanhoudt	6	1	8
(France) J-P Fleurian (United States) J Waite	3	6	6
10	(United States) P Galbraith (New Zealand) B Steven	3	6	7
(France) A Clément (France) J Golmard	6	0	5
(Hungary) G Köves (United States) J Tarango	5	6	6
15	(Sweden) N Kulti (Sweden) M Tillström	7	1	2
(The Bahamas) M Knowles (Canada) D Nestor	4	6	7
(Netherlands) J Siemerink (Netherlands) F Wibier	6	4	5
(The Bahamas) M Merklein (United States) M Sell	6	6
(Zimbabwe) B Black (United States) R Reneberg	3	4
2	(Australia) T Woodbridge (Australia) M Woodforde	6	6
(South Africa) C Haggard (South Africa) P Rosner	4	3

Second round
(Argentina) M Hood (Argentina) S Prieto	0	7	6
(Australia) P Kilderry (United States) K Kinnear	6	5	2
(North Macedonia) A Kitinov (Belgium) T Vanhoudt	2	4
10	(United States) P Galbraith (New Zealand) B Steven	6	6
(Hungary) G Köves (United States) J Tarango	6	4	4
(The Bahamas) M Knowles (Canada) D Nestor	4	6	6
(The Bahamas) M Merklein (United States) M Sell	2	0
2	(Australia) T Woodbridge (Australia) M Woodforde	6	6

Third round
(Argentina) M Hood (Argentina) S Prieto	3	5
10	(United States) P Galbraith (New Zealand) B Steven	6	7
(The Bahamas) M Knowles (Canada) D Nestor	6	6
2	(Australia) T Woodbridge (Australia) M Woodforde	4	2

Quarterfinals
10	(United States) P Galbraith (New Zealand) B Steven	3	4
(The Bahamas) M Knowles (Canada) D Nestor	6	6
