= 1998 French Open – Women's singles =

Women's singles
- 1998 French Open

Final
- Champion: (Spain) Arantxa Sánchez Vicario
- Runner-up: (United States) Monica Seles
- Score: 7–6^{(7–5)}, 0–6, 6–2

Details
- Draw: 128
- Seeds: 16

Events
Singles	men	women		boys	girls
Doubles	men	women	mixed	boys	girls
WC Singles	men	women	quad
WC Doubles	men	women	quad
Legends	−45	45+	women
- French Open

Arantxa Sánchez Vicario defeated Monica Seles in the final, 7–6^{(7–5)}, 0–6, 6–2 to win the women's singles tennis title at the 1998 French Open. It was her third French Open title and fourth and last major singles title overall, and the last major singles final for both players. This was also the third and the last victory for Sánchez Vicario over Seles in their rivalry.

Iva Majoli was the defending champion, but lost to Lindsay Davenport in the quarterfinals.

This is the most recent edition of the French Open to have a final that was a rematch of a previous edition's final. Both finalists previously met in 1991, which was won by Seles.

Martina Hingis was attempting to complete a non-calendar-year Grand Slam, having won the preceding Wimbledon, US Open, and Australian Open titles, but lost to Seles in the semifinals.

This marked the first French Open singles appearance of future three-time champion, 23-time major winner, Olympic gold medalist and world No. 1 Serena Williams; she lost to Sánchez Vicario in the fourth round.

== Seeds ==
1. (Switzerland) Martina Hingis (semifinals)
2. (United States) Lindsay Davenport (semifinals)
3. (Czech Republic) Jana Novotná (quarterfinals)
4. (Spain) Arantxa Sánchez Vicario (champion)
5. (South Africa) Amanda Coetzer (first round)
6. (United States) Monica Seles (final)
7. (Spain) Conchita Martínez (fourth round)
8. (United States) Venus Williams (quarterfinals)
9. (Romania) Irina Spîrlea (first round)
10. (Croatia) Iva Majoli (quarterfinals)
11. (France) Mary Pierce (second round)
12. (France) Nathalie Tauziat (first round)
13. (Russia) Anna Kournikova (fourth round)
14. (France) Sandrine Testud (fourth round)
15. (Belgium) Dominique Van Roost (third round)
16. (United States) Lisa Raymond (first round)

== Draw ==
Key

- Q = Qualifier
- WC = Wild card
- LL = Lucky loser
- Alt = Alternate
- ITF = ITF entry
- PR = Protected ranking
- SR = Special ranking
- SE = Special exempt
- JE = Junior exempt
- JR = Junior Accelerator Programme entrant
- CO = College Accelerator Programme entrant
- NG = Next Gen Accelerator Program entrant
- w/o = Walkover
- r = Retired
- d = Defaulted

=== Finals ===
Quarterfinals
1	(Switzerland) Martina Hingis	6	6
8	(United States) Venus Williams	3	4
3	(Czech Republic) Jana Novotná	6	3	3
6	(United States) Monica Seles	4	6	6
(Switzerland) Patty Schnyder	2	7^{7}	0
4	(Spain) Arantxa Sánchez Vicario	6	6^{5}	6
10	(Croatia) Iva Majoli	1	7	3
2	(United States) Lindsay Davenport	6	5	6

Semifinals
1	(Switzerland) Martina Hingis	3	2
6	(United States) Monica Seles	6	6
4	(Spain) Arantxa Sánchez Vicario	6	7^{7}
2	(United States) Lindsay Davenport	3	6^{5}

Final
6	(United States) Monica Seles	6^{5}	6	2
4	(Spain) Arantxa Sánchez Vicario	7^{7}	0	6

=== Top half ===
==== Section 1 ====
First round
1	(Switzerland) M Hingis	6	6
(Spain) M Sánchez Lorenzo	2	1
(Germany) M Babel	6	6
(Japan) Y Yoshida	1	0
(Australia) N Pratt	6	6
(Argentina) I Gorrochategui	0	2
(Slovakia) K Habšudová	6	6
(Czech Republic) D Chládková	4	0
WC	(France) S Berger	0	2
(Germany) B Rittner	6	6
(Japan) N Sawamatsu	6	2	7
(Czech Republic) L Němečková	3	6	5
(Israel) A Smashnova	3	6	6
(Latvia) L Neiland	6	3	2
(Switzerland) E Gagliardi	4	7	6
12	(France) N Tauziat	6	5	4

Second round
1	(Switzerland) M Hingis	6	6
(Germany) M Babel	1	2
(Australia) N Pratt	6^{5}	2
(Slovakia) K Habšudová	7^{7}	6
(Germany) B Rittner	6	6
(Japan) N Sawamatsu	3	4
(Israel) A Smashnova	5	6	6
(Switzerland) E Gagliardi	7	0	1

Third round
1	(Switzerland) M Hingis	6	6
(Slovakia) K Habšudová	4	2
(Germany) B Rittner	6	4	1
(Israel) A Smashnova	1	6	6

Fourth round
1	(Switzerland) M Hingis	6	6
(Israel) A Smashnova	1	2

==== Section 2 ====
First round
9	(Romania) I Spîrlea	2	4
(Austria) S Plischke	6	6
(Slovakia) H Nagyová	6	6
(Australia) R McQuillan	3	4
(France) N Dechy	6	1	6
(Belarus) O Barabanschikova	3	6	1
(France) A Cocheteux	5	6^{5}
(United States) A Wunderlich	7	7^{7}
(France) A Dechaume-Balleret	6	5	6
(Ukraine) O Lugina	1	7	2
(Austria) B Schett	7	2	2
(Czech Republic) A Gerši	5	6	6
(Italy) L Golarsa	5	3
(Japan) A Sugiyama	7	6
(Thailand) T Tanasugarn	3	1
8	(United States) V Williams	6	6

Second round
(Austria) S Plischke	4	3
(Slovakia) H Nagyová	6	6
(France) N Dechy	6	6
(United States) A Wunderlich	1	1
(France) A Dechaume-Balleret	6	5	6
(Czech Republic) A Gerši	2	7	1
(Japan) A Sugiyama	0	2
8	(United States) V Williams	6	6

Third round
(Slovakia) H Nagyová	7^{7}	3	6
(France) N Dechy	6^{5}	6	1
(France) A Dechaume-Balleret	2	1
8	(United States) V Williams	6	6

Fourth round
(Slovakia) H Nagyová	1	3
8	(United States) V Williams	6	6

==== Section 3 ====
First round
3	(Czech Republic) J Novotná	7	6
(United States) A Miller	5	4
WC	(France) É Loit	6	6
(Spain) C Torrens Valero	4	3
Q	(Ukraine) E Tatarkova	6	6
(United States) K Brandi	4	4
(Czech Republic) K Hrdličková	6	3	6
Q	(Spain) E Bes-Ostariz	4	6	3
(United States) G Helgeson-Nielsen	0	6	10
(Canada) S Jeyaseelan	6	0	12
(Japan) H Inoue	5	1
(Sweden) Å Carlsson	7	6
(Czech Republic) S Kleinová	3	1
(Slovakia) K Studeníková	6	6
(France) A Mauresmo	2	4
13	(Russia) A Kournikova	6	6

Second round
3	(Czech Republic) J Novotná	7	6
WC	(France) É Loit	5	0
Q	(Ukraine) E Tatarkova	6	6
(Czech Republic) K Hrdličková	4	1
(Canada) S Jeyaseelan	4	0
(Sweden) Å Carlsson	6	6
(Slovakia) K Studeníková	2	6^{2}
13	(Russia) A Kournikova	6	7^{7}

Third round
3	(Czech Republic) J Novotná	6	7^{7}
Q	(Ukraine) E Tatarkova	3	6^{5}
(Sweden) Å Carlsson	0	0
13	(Russia) A Kournikova	6	6

Fourth round
3	(Czech Republic) J Novotná	6^{2}	6	6
13	(Russia) A Kournikova	7^{7}	3	3

==== Section 4 ====
First round
16	(United States) L Raymond	3	4
(Russia) T Panova	6	6
(United States) L McNeil	6	3	4
(United States) C Rubin	3	6	6
(France) S Pitkowski	5	5
(Japan) M Saeki	7	7
WC	(France) L Andretto	6	6
(Venezuela) M-A Vento	3	3
(Germany) W Probst	6^{5}	1
(Austria) B Schwartz	7^{7}	6
(Netherlands) M Oremans	6	1	6
(Russia) E Makarova	1	6	3
(Australia) K-A Guse	5	3
(Austria) M Maruska	7	6
(Australia) A Ellwood	0	2
6	(United States) M Seles	6	6

Second round
(Russia) T Panova	1	1
(United States) C Rubin	6	6
(Japan) M Saeki	6	7^{7}
WC	(France) L Andretto	1	6^{5}
(Austria) B Schwartz	6	6
(Netherlands) M Oremans	4	2
(Austria) M Maruska	6	1	0
6	(United States) M Seles	2	6	6

Third round
(United States) C Rubin	6	6
(Japan) M Saeki	3	4
(Austria) B Schwartz	1	5
6	(United States) M Seles	6	7

Fourth round
(United States) C Rubin	1	4
6	(United States) M Seles	6	6

=== Bottom half ===
==== Section 5 ====
First round
5	(South Africa) A Coetzer	4	6	6
(Switzerland) P Schnyder	6	3	8
(Japan) N Kijimuta	1	2
WC	(France) J Halard-Decugis	6	6
(Germany) A Glass	3	4
(South Africa) J Kruger	6	6
(Chinese Taipei) S-t Wang	2	1
(Italy) S Farina	6	6
(Romania) R Dragomir	6	4	6
PR	(Slovakia) J Husárová	2	6	3
(Italy) F Perfetti	6	6
(Italy) S Cecchini	4	3
(Canada) P Hy-Boulais	1	1
(Spain) M Serna	6	6
(Belgium) S Appelmans	2	3
11	(France) M Pierce	6	6

Second round
(Switzerland) P Schnyder	6	3	6
WC	(France) J Halard-Decugis	3	6	1
(South Africa) J Kruger	6	3	0
(Italy) S Farina	4	6	6
(Romania) R Dragomir	6	6
(Italy) F Perfetti	0	2
(Spain) M Serna	7	6
11	(France) M Pierce	5	2

Third round
(Switzerland) P Schnyder	6	6
(Italy) S Farina	2	1
(Romania) R Dragomir	4	6	1
(Spain) M Serna	6	2	6

Fourth round
(Switzerland) P Schnyder	6	6
(Spain) M Serna	1	3

==== Section 6 ====
First round
15	(Belgium) D Van Roost	7	3	6
(Poland) M Grzybowska	5	6	4
(France) L Ghirardi-Rubbi	2	7^{10}	3
Q	(Belgium) E Callens	6	6^{8}	6
(United States) C Morariu	6	2
(Netherlands) B Schultz-McCarthy	3	0^{r}
(Canada) J Nejedly	2	6	4
(United States) S Williams	6	1	6
(United States) T Snyder	7	6
WC	(France) E Curutchet	5	1
(Austria) B Paulus	1	5
(France) A Fusai	6	7
(Romania) C Cristea	6	6
(South Africa) M de Swardt	1	2
(Germany) J Kandarr	2	5
4	(Spain) A Sánchez Vicario	6	7

Second round
15	(Belgium) D Van Roost	6	6
Q	(Belgium) E Callens	3	0
(United States) C Morariu	1	0
(United States) S Williams	6	6
(United States) T Snyder	4	3
(France) A Fusai	6	6
(Romania) C Cristea	2	3
4	(Spain) A Sánchez Vicario	6	6

Third round
15	(Belgium) D Van Roost	1	1
(United States) S Williams	6	6
(France) A Fusai	2	1
4	(Spain) A Sánchez Vicario	6	6

Fourth round
(United States) S Williams	6	5	3
4	(Spain) A Sánchez Vicario	4	7	6

==== Section 7 ====
First round
7	(Spain) C Martínez	6	6
WC	(France) M Lamarre	1	1
(Chinese Taipei) J Lee	6^{7}	3
(Italy) R Grande	7^{9}	6
(Germany) S Klösel	1	2
(Spain) V Ruano Pascual	6	6
WC	(France) N van Lottum	6	3	2
(France) A-G Sidot	2	6	6
(South Korea) S-h Park	5	6	6
(Italy) F Lubiani	7	1	2
Q	(Argentina) M Díaz Oliva	7^{10}	6
(China) F Li	6^{8}	1
(Argentina) F Labat	1	5
(Belarus) N Zvereva	6	7
(Bulgaria) P Stoyanova	3	1
10	(Croatia) I Majoli	6	6

Second round
7	(Spain) C Martínez	6	6
(Italy) R Grande	1	2
(Spain) V Ruano Pascual	6	7^{8}
(France) A-G Sidot	4	6^{6}
(South Korea) S-h Park	2	2
Q	(Argentina) M Díaz Oliva	6	6
(Belarus) N Zvereva	3	4
10	(Croatia) I Majoli	6	6

Third round
7	(Spain) C Martínez	6	6
(Spain) V Ruano Pascual	1	0
Q	(Argentina) M Díaz Oliva	2	6^{2}
10	(Croatia) I Majoli	6	7^{7}

Fourth round
7	(Spain) C Martínez	6^{1}	7^{7}	3
10	(Croatia) I Majoli	7^{7}	6^{3}	6

==== Section 8 ====
First round
14	(France) S Testud	2	6	6
(United States) S Reeves	6	2	3
(Japan) N Miyagi	6	0	1
(Bulgaria) E Pampoulova	3	6	6
(Indonesia) N Basuki	3	2
(Spain) G León García	6	6
Q	(Czech Republic) R Bobková	6	6^{1}	7
(Argentina) P Suárez	3	7^{7}	9
(United States) S Cacic	4	3
(Russia) E Likhovtseva	6	6
Q	(Spain) A Alcázar	3	6	3
Q	(Zimbabwe) C Black	6	4	6
WC	(France) C Dhenin	6	3	0
Q	(South Africa) L Horn	3	6	6
(United States) K Po	2	2
2	(United States) L Davenport	6	6

Second round
14	(France) S Testud	6	6
(Bulgaria) E Pampoulova	2	0
(Spain) G León García	6	1	7
(Argentina) P Suárez	2	6	5
(Russia) E Likhovtseva	7	7
Q	(Zimbabwe) C Black	5	5
Q	(South Africa) L Horn	2	0
2	(United States) L Davenport	6	6

Third round
14	(France) S Testud	6	6
(Spain) G León García	1	1
(Russia) E Likhovtseva	5	5
2	(United States) L Davenport	7	7

Fourth round
14	(France) S Testud	3	6	2
2	(United States) L Davenport	6	4	6

Preceded by 1998 Australian Open – Women's singles	Grand Slam women's singles	Succeeded by 1998 Wimbledon Championships – Women's singles
