= Michael Sell =

American tennis player

- Country (sports): United States
- Residence: Cherry Hill, NJ
- Born: August 23, 1972 (age 54) Berkeley, California
- Height: 5 ft 11 in (1.80 m)
- Turned pro: 1995
- Plays: Right-handed
- Prize money: $294,371

Singles
- Career record: 6–16
- Career titles: 0
- Highest ranking: No. 136 (March 30, 1998)

Grand Slam singles results
- French Open: 1R (1998)
- US Open: 2R (1997)

Doubles
- Career record: 19–26
- Career titles: 0
- Highest ranking: No. 83 (August 24, 1998)

Grand Slam doubles results
- Australian Open: 2R (1998)
- French Open: 2R (1998, 1999)
- Wimbledon: 2R (1999)
- US Open: 2R (1997, 1998)
Medal record
Representing United States
Summer Universiade
Bronze medal – third place	1993 Buffalo	Doubles

Michael Sell (born August 23, 1972) is a former professional tennis player from the United States. He was the co-head coach of the women's tennis team at Louisiana State University with Julia Sell from 2015 to April 2022.

== Career ==
At the 1989 Boys' Junior National Tennis Championship, Sell lost to Alexis Hombrecher in the 4th round. He had better success as a 4-time All-American for the University of Georgia. He and Rob Givone won the bronze medal in the men's doubles at the 1993 Summer Universiade.

Sell appeared in the main singles draw of two Grand Slams. In the 1997 US Open he beat Cecil Mamiit in the opening round, then lost in four sets to Daniel Vacek. He exited in the opening round of the 1998 French Open, losing to Jordi Mas, despite taking the first set 6–0. His best performance on the singles circuit came at the 1999 Japan Open Tennis Championships, where he defeated Mark Woodforde and Gouichi Motomura to make the round of 16. In the 2000 Heineken Open he had a win over world number 34 Nicolas Escude.

In doubles, he reached the 2nd round of all four Grand Slams, including the 1998 Australian Open where he partnered French Open winner Gustavo Kuerten. His best results came when he teamed up with countryman David DiLucia. The pair twice made the semi-finals of San Jose's Sybase Open, in 1998 and 1999.

Sell served as the personal coach of Monica Seles, Donald Young, and John Isner.

== Challenger Titles ==
=== Singles: (3) ===
No.	Year	Tournament	Surface	Opponent in the final	Score in the final
1.	1997	Bronx, United States	Hard	(Italy) Gianluca Pozzi	3–6, 6–4, 6–3
2.	1997	Sedona, United States	Hard	(United States) Glenn Weiner	6–4, 6–4
3.	1999	Puebla, Mexico	Hard	(Mexico) Alejandro Hernández	7–6^{(7–5)}, 7–5

=== Doubles: (11) ===
No.	Year	Tournament	Surface	Partner	Opponents in the final	Score in the final
1.	1996	Monterrey, Mexico	Hard	(Armenia) Sargis Sargsian	(Zimbabwe) Kevin Ullyett (South Africa) Myles Wakefield	6–2, 3–6, 6–3
2.	1996	Austin, United States	Hard	(Armenia) Sargis Sargsian	(United States) T.J. Middleton (United States) Bryan Shelton	7–5, 7–6
3.	1997	Winnetka, United States	Hard	(South Africa) Myles Wakefield	(United States) Chad Clark (Australia) Ben Ellwood	6–3, 7–6
4.	1997	Urbana, United States	Hard	(Zimbabwe) Kevin Ullyett	(Japan) Gouichi Motomura (Japan) Takao Suzuki	3–6, 7–6, 6–2
5.	1997	Delray Beach, United States	Hard	(Zimbabwe) Kevin Ullyett	(United States) Oren Motevassel (Italy) Daniele Musa	6–3, 6–3
6.	1997	Las Vegas, United States	Hard	(United States) David DiLucia	(United States) Paul Goldstein (United States) Jim Thomas	6–4, 6–4
7.	1998	Salinas, Ecuador	Hard	(United States) David DiLucia	(Argentina) Mariano Hood (Argentina) Sebastián Prieto	7–6, 6–4
8.	1998	San Antonio, United States	Hard	(United States) David DiLucia	(Australia) Michael Hill (United States) Scott Humphries	6–3, 6–1
9.	1999	Lexington, United States	Hard	(Romania) Gabriel Trifu	(United States) Scott Humphries (United States) Kevin Kim	7–6^{(7–4)}, 6–7^{(5–7)}, 6–4
10.	1999	Houston, United States	Hard	(United States) David DiLucia	(Canada) Bobby Kokavec (Canada) Jocelyn Robichaud	7–6^{(10–8)}, 6–0
11.	2000	Tulsa, United States	Hard	(Mexico) Enrique Abaroa	(Romania) Gabriel Trifu (United States) Glenn Weiner	5–7, 6–4, 6–2

== Coaching career ==
- 2001-2002 - Monica Seles - Personal Coach
- 2003-2007 - USTA National Coach
- 2007-2012 - USTA Lead National Coach
- 2012 - USA Olympic Assistant Tennis Coach - London Games
- 2013-2014 - John Isner - Personal Coach
- 2015-2022 - Co-head Coach LSU Women's Tennis
- 2022 to Current - Director LTP Professional Program
