= Andreas Fasching =

Austrian tennis player

- Country (sports): Austria
- Born: 1 January 1981 (age 44)
- Plays: Right-handed
- Prize money: $25,862

Singles
- Career record: 0–1 (ATP Tour)
- Highest ranking: No. 423 (12 Nov 2001)

Doubles
- Highest ranking: No. 885 (18 Aug 2003)

Andreas Fasching (born 1 January 1981) is an Austrian former professional tennis player.

Fasching, who comes from Styria, left school at the age of 16 to compete professionally and trained under Günter Bresnik. He reached a career high world ranking of 423 and made his only ATP Tour main draw appearance in 2006 at the Austrian Open, losing in the first round to Ivan Ljubičić.

Retiring in 2006, Fasching became a tennis coach and in 2013 began working for the ÖTV.

== ITF Futures titles ==
=== Singles: (1) ===
No.	Date	Tournament	Surface	Opponent	Score
1.	Apr 2002	Mexico F4, Guadalajara	Clay	(Romania) Răzvan Sabău	6–2, ret.
