= 1998 French Open – Women's doubles =

Women's doubles
- 1998 French Open

Final
- Champion: (Switzerland) Martina Hingis (Czech Republic) Jana Novotná
- Runner-up: (United States) Lindsay Davenport (Belarus) Natasha Zvereva
- Score: 6–1, 7–6^{(7–4)}

Details
- Draw: 64 (4 WC )
- Seeds: 16

Events
Singles	men	women		boys	girls
Doubles	men	women	mixed	boys	girls
WC Singles	men	women	quad
WC Doubles	men	women	quad
Legends	−45	45+	women
← 1997 ·	French Open	· 1999 →

Martina Hingis and Jana Novotná defeated the defending champion Natasha Zvereva and her partner Lindsay Davenport in the final, 6–1, 7–6^{(7–4)} to win the women's doubles tennis title at the 1998 French Open. They did not drop a single set en route to the title. It was the second step in an eventual Grand Slam for Hingis.

Gigi Fernández and Zvereva were the reigning champions, but Fernández retired from tennis at the end of 1997.

== Seeds ==
Champion seeds are indicated in bold text while text in italics indicates the round in which those seeds were eliminated.

1. (United States) Lindsay Davenport / (Belarus) Natasha Zvereva (final)
2. (Switzerland) **Martina Hingis** / (Czech Republic) **Jana Novotná (champions)**
3. (Spain) Arantxa Sánchez Vicario / (Czech Republic) Helena Suková (semifinals)
4. (France) Alexandra Fusai / (France) Nathalie Tauziat (quarterfinals)
5. (Indonesia) Yayuk Basuki / (Netherlands) Caroline Vis (third round)
6. (United States) Lisa Raymond / (Australia) Rennae Stubbs (first round)
7. (United States) Katrina Adams / (Netherlands) Manon Bollegraf (third round)
8. (Russia) Anna Kournikova / (Latvia) Larisa Neiland (semifinals)
9. (Spain) Conchita Martínez / (Argentina) Patricia Tarabini (quarterfinals)
10. (Russia) Elena Likhovtseva / (Japan) Ai Sugiyama (third round)
11. (Japan) Naoko Kijimuta / (Japan) Nana Miyagi (first round)
12. (Belgium) Sabine Appelmans / (Netherlands) Miriam Oremans (second round)
13. (Australia) Catherine Barclay / (Australia) Kerry-Anne Guse (third round)
14. (Austria) Barbara Schett / (Switzerland) Patty Schnyder (quarterfinals)
15. (Argentina) Inés Gorrochategui / (Australia) Rachel McQuillan (first round)
16. (Spain) Virginia Ruano Pascual / (Argentina) Paola Suárez (second round)

== Draw ==
=== Key ===
- Q = Qualifier
- WC = Wild card
- LL = Lucky loser
- Alt = Alternate
- SE = Special exempt
- PR = Protected ranking
- ITF = ITF entry
- JE = Junior exempt
- w/o = Walkover
- r = Retired
- d = Defaulted
- SR = Special ranking

=== Finals ===
Quarterfinals
1	(United States) Lindsay Davenport (Belarus) Natasha Zvereva	6	7
14	(Austria) Barbara Schett (Switzerland) Patty Schnyder	4	5
4	(France) Alexandra Fusai (France) Nathalie Tauziat	5	3
8	(Russia) Anna Kournikova (Latvia) Larisa Neiland	7	6
(Italy) Silvia Farina (Slovakia) Karina Habšudová	0	3
3	(Spain) Arantxa Sánchez Vicario (Czech Republic) Helena Suková	6	6
9	(Spain) Conchita Martínez (Argentina) Patricia Tarabini	3	2
2	(Switzerland) Martina Hingis (Czech Republic) Jana Novotná	6	6

Semifinals
1	(United States) Lindsay Davenport (Belarus) Natasha Zvereva	6	6
8	(Russia) Anna Kournikova (Latvia) Larisa Neiland	3	2
3	(Spain) Arantxa Sánchez Vicario (Czech Republic) Helena Suková	5	6^{2}
2	(Switzerland) Martina Hingis (Czech Republic) Jana Novotná	7	7

Final
1	(United States) Lindsay Davenport (Belarus) Natasha Zvereva	1	6^{4}
2	(Switzerland) Martina Hingis (Czech Republic) Jana Novotná	6	7

=== Top half ===
==== Section 1 ====
First round
1	(United States) L Davenport (Belarus) N Zvereva	6	6
(United Kingdom) J Pullin (United Kingdom) L Woodroffe	2	2
(Slovenia) T Križan (Slovenia) K Srebotnik	6	6
(Australia) D Jones (Germany) C Schneider	1	1
(Romania) C Cristea (Argentina) L Montalvo	6	6
(Canada) S Jeyaseelan (Canada) R Simpson	1	3
(South Africa) M de Swardt (United States) D Graham	6	7
15	(Argentina) I Gorrochategui (Australia) R McQuillan	4	6^{14}
14	(Austria) B Schett (Switzerland) P Schnyder	6^{4}	6	6
(United States) S Cacic (France) M Pierce	7	3	2
(Australia) T Musgrave (Poland) A Olsza	2	2
WC	(France) A Dechaume-Balleret (France) A Mauresmo	6	6
(South Africa) S De Beer (United States) L Lee-Waters	6	3	2
(Argentina) F Labat (Belgium) D Van Roost	3	6	6
Alt	(Czechoslovakia) P Langrová (Italy) F Perfetti	4	6^{3}
5	(Indonesia) Y Basuki (Netherlands) C Vis	6	7

Second round
1	(United States) L Davenport (Belarus) N Zvereva	6	6
(Slovenia) T Križan (Slovenia) K Srebotnik	4	1
(Romania) C Cristea (Argentina) L Montalvo	6^{9}	2
(South Africa) M de Swardt (United States) D Graham	7	6
14	(Austria) B Schett (Switzerland) P Schnyder	6	6
WC	(France) A Dechaume-Balleret (France) A Mauresmo	4	4
(Argentina) F Labat (Belgium) D Van Roost	3	7	3
5	(Indonesia) Y Basuki (Netherlands) C Vis	6	6^{4}	6

Third round
1	(United States) L Davenport (Belarus) N Zvereva	6	6
(South Africa) M de Swardt (United States) D Graham	1	2
14	(Austria) B Schett (Switzerland) P Schnyder	6	6
5	(Indonesia) Y Basuki (Netherlands) C Vis	1	4

Quarterfinals
1	(United States) L Davenport (Belarus) N Zvereva	6	7
14	(Austria) B Schett (Switzerland) P Schnyder	4	5

==== Section 2 ====
First round
4	(France) A Fusai (France) N Tauziat	6	2	6
(Czech Republic) R Bobková (Czech Republic) E Melicharová	1	6	0
(Poland) M Grzybowska (France) A-G Sidot	6	1	6
(Sweden) Å Carlsson (United States) C Rubin	3	6	4
(Netherlands) S Noorlander (France) N van Lottum	1	3
(United States) E deLone (United States) K Schlukebir	6	6
(Japan) M Saeki (Japan) Y Yoshida	4	4
10	(Russia) E Likhovtseva (Japan) A Sugiyama	6	6
12	(Belgium) S Appelmans (Netherlands) M Oremans	6	6
WC	(France) N Dechy (France) L Ghirardi	4	2
(Germany) M Babel (Germany) W Probst	6	6
(Belarus) O Barabanschikova (Slovakia) H Nagyová	4	3
WC	(France) E Curutchet (France) S Georges	6^{0}	7	2
(Germany) C Singer (Czech Republic) H Vildová	7	5	6
SR	(Netherlands) P Kamstra (Netherlands) S Rottier	2	3
8	(Russia) A Kournikova (Latvia) L Neiland	6	6

Second round
4	(France) A Fusai (France) N Tauziat	6	6
(Poland) M Grzybowska (France) A-G Sidot	4	1
(United States) E deLone (United States) K Schlukebir	2	2
10	(Russia) E Likhovtseva (Japan) A Sugiyama	6	6
12	(Belgium) S Appelmans (Netherlands) M Oremans	4	6^{5}
(Germany) M Babel (Germany) W Probst	6	7
(Germany) C Singer (Czech Republic) H Vildová	2	1
8	(Russia) A Kournikova (Latvia) L Neiland	6	6

Third round
4	(France) A Fusai (France) N Tauziat	5	7	6
10	(Russia) E Likhovtseva (Japan) A Sugiyama	7	6^{8}	4
(Germany) M Babel (Germany) W Probst	0	3
8	(Russia) A Kournikova (Latvia) L Neiland	6	6

Quarterfinals
4	(France) A Fusai (France) N Tauziat	5	3
8	(Russia) A Kournikova (Latvia) L Neiland	7	6

=== Bottom half ===
==== Section 3 ====
First round
6	(United States) L Raymond (Australia) R Stubbs	5	5
(France) C Dhenin (France) É Loit	7	7
(Canada) P Hy-Boulais (Germany) B Rittner	6	6
(South Africa) L Horn (United States) S Reeves	4	1
(Italy) S Farina (Slovakia) K Habšudová	6	6
(Belgium) E Callens (United States) G Helgeson-Nielsen	1	1
(Italy) R Grande (Romania) I Spîrlea	6	7
11	(Japan) N Kijimuta (Japan) N Miyagi	4	6^{5}
13	(Australia) C Barclay (Australia) K-A Guse	6	6
(Belgium) N Feber (Bulgaria) S Krivencheva	2	1
(France) J Halard-Decugis (France) S Testud	6	6
(Germany) K Freye (Bulgaria) P Stoyanova	4	1
(South Korea) S-h Park (Thailand) T Tanasugarn	2	3
(United States) L McNeil (United States) K Po	6	6
(Hungary) V Csurgó (Hungary) K Marosi	0	2
3	(Spain) A Sánchez Vicario (Czech Republic) H Suková	6	6

Second round
(France) C Dhenin (France) É Loit	6	6
(Canada) P Hy-Boulais (Germany) B Rittner	1	2
(Italy) S Farina (Slovakia) K Habšudová	5	7	8
(Italy) R Grande (Romania) I Spîrlea	7	5	6
13	(Australia) C Barclay (Australia) K-A Guse	6	6
(France) J Halard-Decugis (France) S Testud	1	3
(United States) L McNeil (United States) K Po	7	1	2
3	(Spain) A Sánchez Vicario (Czech Republic) H Suková	5	6	6

Third round
(France) C Dhenin (France) É Loit	2	7	3
(Italy) S Farina (Slovakia) K Habšudová	6	6^{5}	6
13	(Australia) C Barclay (Australia) K-A Guse	7	3	12
3	(Spain) A Sánchez Vicario (Czech Republic) H Suková	6^{8}	6	14

Quarterfinals
(Italy) S Farina (Slovakia) K Habšudová	0	3
3	(Spain) A Sánchez Vicario (Czech Republic) H Suková	6	6

==== Section 4 ====
First round
7	(United States) K Adams (Netherlands) M Bollegraf	6	6^{2}	6
(Ukraine) O Lugina (Bulgaria) E Pampoulova	2	7	2
(South Africa) N de Villiers (Australia) L McShea	5	5
(Italy) L Golarsa (Argentina) M Paz	7	7
WC	(France) A Cocheteux (France) S Pitkowski	5	6	7
(Austria) K Kschwendt (Ukraine) E Tatarkova	7	3	5
(Romania) R Dragomir (Croatia) I Majoli	7	4	2
9	(Spain) C Martínez (Argentina) P Tarabini	5	6	6
16	(Spain) V Ruano Pascual (Argentina) P Suárez	6	6
(Australia) A Ellwood (Australia) N Pratt	3	2
(South Korea) E-h Kim (Australia) L Pleming	3	4
(Australia) K Kunce (United States) C Morariu	6	6
(Chinese Taipei) J Lee (Chinese Taipei) S-t Wang	6	4	6
(Slovakia) J Husárová (Ukraine) N Medvedeva	3	6	4
(Japan) R Hiraki (United States) A Wunderlich	1	0
2	(Switzerland) M Hingis (Czech Republic) J Novotná	6	6

Second round
7	(United States) K Adams (Netherlands) M Bollegraf	6	7
(Italy) L Golarsa (Argentina) M Paz	1	6^{5}
WC	(France) A Cocheteux (France) S Pitkowski
9	(Spain) C Martínez (Argentina) P Tarabini	W-O
16	(Spain) V Ruano Pascual (Argentina) P Suárez	4	2
(Australia) K Kunce (United States) C Morariu	6	6
(Chinese Taipei) Janet Lee (Chinese Taipei) Wang Shi-ting	0	2
2	(Switzerland) M Hingis (Czech Republic) J Novotná	6	6

Third round
7	(United States) K Adams (Netherlands) M Bollegraf	6	3	4
9	(Spain) C Martínez (Argentina) P Tarabini	4	6	6
(Australia) K Kunce (United States) C Morariu	0	1
2	(Switzerland) M Hingis (Czech Republic) J Novotná	6	6

Quarterfinals
9	(Spain) C Martínez (Argentina) P Tarabini	3	2
2	(Switzerland) M Hingis (Czech Republic) J Novotná	6	6
