= 1998 French Open – Men's singles =

Men's singles
- 1998 French Open

Final
- Champion: (Spain) Carlos Moyá
- Runner-up: (Spain) Àlex Corretja
- Score: 6–3, 7–5, 6–3

Details
- Draw: 128
- Seeds: 16

Events
Singles	men	women		boys	girls
Doubles	men	women	mixed	boys	girls
WC Singles	men	women	quad
WC Doubles	men	women	quad
Legends	−45	45+	women
← 1997 ·	French Open	· 1999 →

Carlos Moyá defeated Àlex Corretja in the final, 6–3, 7–5, 6–3 to win the men's singles tennis title at the 1998 French Open. It was his first and only major singles title.

Gustavo Kuerten was the defending champion, but he lost in the second round to future world No. 1 and two-time major champion Marat Safin, who was making his major main-draw debut.

== Seeds ==
1. (United States) Pete Sampras (second round)
2. (Czech Republic) Petr Korda (first round)
3. (Chile) Marcelo Ríos (quarterfinals)
4. (Australia) Pat Rafter (second round)
5. (United Kingdom) Greg Rusedski (first round)
6. (Russia) Yevgeny Kafelnikov (second round)
7. (Sweden) Jonas Björkman (first round)
8. (Brazil) Gustavo Kuerten (second round)

9. (Slovakia) Karol Kučera (first round)
10. (Netherlands) Richard Krajicek (third round)
11. (United States) Michael Chang (third round)
12. (Spain) Carlos Moyá (champion)
13. (Spain) Albert Costa (fourth round)
14. (Spain) Àlex Corretja (final)
15. (Spain) Félix Mantilla (semifinals)
16. (Spain) Alberto Berasategui (fourth round)

Click on the seed number of a player to go to their draw section.

== Draw ==
=== Key ===
- Q = Qualifier
- WC = Wild card
- LL = Lucky loser
- Alt = Alternate
- ITF = ITF entry
- PR = Protected ranking
- SR = Special ranking
- SE = Special exempt
- JE = Junior exempt
- JR = Junior Accelerator Programme entrant
- CO = College Accelerator Programme entrant
- NG = Next Gen Accelerator Program entrant
- w/o = Walkover
- r = Retired
- d = Defaulted

=== Finals ===
Quarterfinals
15	(Spain) Félix Mantilla	6	6	4	6
(Austria) Thomas Muster	4	2	6	3
3	(Chile) Marcelo Ríos	1	6	2	4
12	(Spain) Carlos Moyá	6	2	6	6
(Belgium) Filip Dewulf	5	4	3
14	(Spain) Àlex Corretja	7	6	6
(France) Cédric Pioline	3	6	7^{8}	4	6
(Morocco) Hicham Arazi	6	2	6^{6}	6	3

Semifinals
15	(Spain) Félix Mantilla	7	2	4	2
12	(Spain) Carlos Moyá	5	6	6	6
14	(Spain) Àlex Corretja	6	6	6
(France) Cédric Pioline	3	4	2

Final
12	(Spain) Carlos Moyá	6	7	6
14	(Spain) Àlex Corretja	3	5	3

=== Top half ===
==== Section 1 ====
First round
1	(United States) P Sampras	6	6	6
(United States) T Martin	4	3	3
(Paraguay) R Delgado	6	0
(Czech Republic) M Damm	2	0^{r}
(Armenia) S Sargsian	5
(United Kingdom) T Henman	2^{r}
(Ukraine) A Medvedev	6^{5}	1	6	6	1
(Italy) A Gaudenzi	7^{7}	6	0	2	6
(Argentina) L Arnold Ker	4	6	6	6
(Italy) D Sanguinetti	6	4	1	4
(France) F Santoro	6	6	6
WC	(France) J-F Bachelot	3	1	2
(France) A Clément	4	1	2
(Zimbabwe) B Black	6	6	6
Q	(Austria) W Schranz	2	4	2
15	(Spain) F Mantilla	6	6	6

Second round
1	(United States) P Sampras	6^{6}	3	4
(Paraguay) R Delgado	7^{8}	6	6
(Armenia) S Sargsian	6	6	6^{5}	6
(Italy) A Gaudenzi	4	2	7^{7}	4
(Argentina) L Arnold Ker	6	6	4	0	3
(France) F Santoro	4	4	6	6	6
(Zimbabwe) B Black	2	2	6^{2}
15	(Spain) F Mantilla	6	6	7^{7}

Third round
(Paraguay) R Delgado	2	7^{7}	6	7^{9}
(Armenia) S Sargsian	6	6^{4}	4	6^{7}
(France) F Santoro	6	2	2	5
15	(Spain) F Mantilla	4	6	6	7

Fourth round
(Paraguay) R Delgado	2	2	4
15	(Spain) F Mantilla	6	6	6

==== Section 2 ====
First round
9	(Slovakia) K Kučera	6	2	4	3
(Australia) T Woodbridge	1	6	6	6
(Costa Rica) JA Marín	3	6^{6}	6^{2}
(France) G Raoux	6	7^{8}	7^{7}
(United States) V Spadea	5	5
(Canada) D Nestor	7	2^{r}
(Brazil) F Meligeni	6	6	6
(Sweden) T Johansson	4	2	4
(Sweden) T Nydahl	3	6^{2}	3
(Australia) S Draper	6	7^{7}	6
(Germany) M Craca	1	1	1
Q	(Belgium) C Van Garsse	6	6	6
(Germany) N Kiefer	6	6	7^{7}
(Germany) T Haas	1	2	6^{3}
(Austria) T Muster	6	6	6
7	(Sweden) J Björkman	3	3	3

Second round
(Australia) T Woodbridge	6	4	6	6
(France) G Raoux	4	6	3	0
(United States) V Spadea	6^{5}	6^{3}	3
(Brazil) F Meligeni	7^{7}	7^{7}	6
(Australia) S Draper	3	6	7^{7}	6^{2}	2
Q	(Belgium) C Van Garsse	6	3	6^{5}	7^{7}	6
(Germany) N Kiefer	2	1	3
(Austria) T Muster	6	6	6

Third round
(Australia) T Woodbridge	5	3	2
(Brazil) F Meligeni	7	6	6
Q	(Belgium) C Van Garsse	2	6	6^{3}	2
(Austria) T Muster	6	4	7^{7}	6

Fourth round
(Brazil) F Meligeni	4	7^{10}	3	6	3
(Austria) T Muster	6	6^{8}	6	3	6

==== Section 3 ====
First round
3	(Chile) M Ríos	7	6	3	6
(New Zealand) B Steven	5	2	6	3
(Spain) E Benfele Álvarez	5	7	6^{12}	6	6
(Australia) M Tebbutt	7	5	7^{14}	4	3
Q	(Germany) B Karbacher	2	6	3	1
(Sweden) M Norman	6	1	6	6
(Germany) M Sinner	6^{4}	4	5
(South Africa) W Ferreira	7^{7}	6	7
(Czech Republic) B Ulihrach	6	6^{7}	6	6
(Zimbabwe) W Black	1	7^{9}	2	3
(Australia) M Philippoussis	6	7	6
LL	(Germany) O Gross	1	5	4
(Spain) J Burillo	7^{8}	3	2	3
(Germany) M-K Goellner	6^{6}	6	6	6
(Denmark) K Carlsen	3	2	2
13	(Spain) A Costa	6	6	6

Second round
3	(Chile) M Ríos	6	6	6
(Spain) E Benfele Álvarez	4	2	2
(Sweden) M Norman	4	4	4
(South Africa) W Ferreira	6	6	6
(Czech Republic) B Ulihrach	3	6^{2}	7	6	9
(Australia) M Philippoussis	6	7^{7}	5	4	7
(Germany) M-K Goellner	4	6	2
13	(Spain) A Costa	6	7	6

Third round
3	(Chile) M Ríos	6	3
(South Africa) W Ferreira	1	3^{r}
(Czech Republic) B Ulihrach	3	3	0
13	(Spain) A Costa	6	6	6

Fourth round
3	(Chile) M Ríos	4	6	6	6
13	(Spain) A Costa	6	4	3	3

==== Section 4 ====
First round
12	(Spain) C Moyá	7	6	6
WC	(France) S Grosjean	5	1	4
WC	(France) J-B Perlant	6^{6}	6	3	6	1
Q	(Spain) P Imaz	7^{8}	3	6	3	6
(Czech Republic) C Doseděl	5	1	2
(Sweden) M Tillström	7	6	6
(Spain) J Alonso	6	3	3	2
Q	(Australia) A Ilie	4	6	6	6
(United States) J Courier	7^{7}	6	0	6
(Australia) R Fromberg	6^{1}	4	6	4
Q	(Germany) J Knippschild	6	6	6
(Spain) C Costa	4	2	4
Q	(Spain) J Mas	0	6	6	7^{7}
Q	(United States) M Sell	6	4	2	6^{4}
(Belgium) J Van Herck	6	6	6
5	(United Kingdom) G Rusedski	4	4	4

Second round
12	(Spain) C Moyá	6	7^{16}	6
Q	(Spain) P Imaz	4	6^{14}	2
(Sweden) M Tillström	7^{11}	3	3	4
Q	(Australia) A Ilie	6^{9}	6	6	6
(United States) J Courier	4	2	3
Q	(Germany) J Knippschild	6	6	6
Q	(Spain) J Mas	3	6^{4}	5
(Belgium) J Van Herck	6	7^{7}	7

Third round
12	(Spain) C Moyá	6	7^{7}	6
Q	(Australia) A Ilie	2	6^{1}	3
Q	(Germany) J Knippschild	2	0	7^{8}	6	6
(Belgium) J Van Herck	6	6	6^{6}	4	2

Fourth round
12	(Spain) C Moyá	6	7	3	6
Q	(Germany) J Knippschild	3	5	6	4

=== Bottom half ===
==== Section 5 ====
First round
6	(Russia) Y Kafelnikov	6	4	6	6
Q	(Italy) M Navarra	4	6	1	4
(Romania) D Pescariu	6^{4}	4	4
(Sweden) T Enqvist	7^{7}	6	6
Q	(Italy) M Martelli	7^{7}	7^{8}	7^{7}
(Croatia) G Ivanišević	6^{3}	6^{6}	6^{2}
(Belgium) F Dewulf	7^{7}	7	7^{7}
(Sweden) M Larsson	6^{0}	5	6^{5}
WC	(France) A Di Pasquale	6	5	6^{3}	6	0
WC	(France) O Delaître	2	7	7^{7}	1	6
(Spain) F Clavet	6	6	6
PR	(Russia) A Chesnokov	1	4	1
Q	(Netherlands) J van Lottum	6^{5}	6	6	3	6
(Netherlands) J Siemerink	7^{7}	3	2	6	2
(Spain) Á Calatrava	5	3	2
11	(United States) M Chang	7	6	6

Second round
6	(Russia) Y Kafelnikov	6	6^{10}	6^{4}	1
(Sweden) T Enqvist	4	7^{12}	7^{7}	6
Q	(Italy) M Martelli	6^{5}	4	6^{7}
(Belgium) F Dewulf	7^{7}	6	7^{9}
WC	(France) O Delaître	2	4	7^{7}	1
(Spain) F Clavet	6	6	6^{4}	6
Q	(Netherlands) J van Lottum	5	2	0^{r}
11	(United States) M Chang	7	6	3

Third round
(Sweden) T Enqvist	3	2	3
(Belgium) F Dewulf	6	6	6
(Spain) F Clavet	3	7^{7}	6	6
11	(United States) M Chang	6	6^{5}	2	4

Fourth round
(Belgium) F Dewulf	7	6	6
(Spain) F Clavet	5	3	1

==== Section 6 ====
First round
14	(Spain) À Corretja	6	6	0	6
(Morocco) K Alami	3	2	6	4
(Spain) F Vicente	4	6	6	6
(Australia) M Woodforde	6	4	2	1
(Switzerland) M Rosset	2	1	6	4
(Italy) G Pozzi	6	6	4	6
(Argentina) H Gumy	6	6	6
(Spain) S Bruguera	2	2	3
WC	(France) O Mutis	4	6	6	3	2
(Germany) D Prinosil	6	1	4	6	6
(Sweden) M Gustafsson	6	4	6	6
(United States) A O'Brien	2	6	2	2
(Australia) J Stoltenberg	6	4	6	4	10
(Spain) G Blanco	2	6	0	6	8
(Canada) S Lareau	7^{7}	6	1	3	2
4	(Australia) P Rafter	6^{5}	3	6	6	6

Second round
14	(Spain) À Corretja	6	6	6
(Spain) F Vicente	3	2	3
(Italy) G Pozzi	2	3	6	7	9
(Argentina) H Gumy	6	6	3	5	11
(Germany) D Prinosil	4	3	7^{11}	1
(Sweden) M Gustafsson	6	6	6^{9}	6
(Australia) J Stoltenberg	6	2	6	6
4	(Australia) P Rafter	4	6	3	2

Third round
14	(Spain) À Corretja	6	5	6^{4}	7	9
(Argentina) H Gumy	1	7	7^{7}	5	7
(Sweden) M Gustafsson	1	6	4	4
(Australia) J Stoltenberg	6	2	6	6

Fourth round
14	(Spain) À Corretja	6	6	6
(Australia) J Stoltenberg	4	4	3

==== Section 7 ====
First round
8	(Brazil) G Kuerten	6	6	6
WC	(France) C Auffray	0	2	2
Q	(Russia) M Safin	5	7	6	3	6
(United States) A Agassi	7	5	2	6	2
(Netherlands) S Schalken	6	2	4	5
(Czech Republic) D Vacek	1	6	6	7
Q	(Argentina) M Rodríguez	3	2	4
(United States) J-M Gambill	6	6	6
(Uruguay) M Filippini	1	6	5	7^{7}	4
(France) C Pioline	6	3	7	6^{4}	6
Q	(France) J Boutter	6^{6}	6	6	7^{7}
(Germany) C Vinck	7^{8}	3	4	6^{5}
Q	(France) R Gilbert	6	6	2	2	11
(Spain) A Portas	3	3	6	6	9
(Ecuador) N Lapentti	4	4	7^{7}	6^{5}
10	(Netherlands) R Krajicek	6	6	6^{2}	7^{7}

Second round
8	(Brazil) G Kuerten	6	6^{5}	6	1	4
Q	(Russia) M Safin	3	7^{7}	3	6	6
(Czech Republic) D Vacek	6	2	7	7^{7}
(United States) J-M Gambill	4	6	5	6^{0}
(France) C Pioline	7	6	3	6
Q	(France) J Boutter	5	3	6	4
Q	(France) R Gilbert	5	4	1
10	(Netherlands) R Krajicek	7	6	6

Third round
Q	(Russia) M Safin	6	3	6	7
(Czech Republic) D Vacek	3	6	3	5
(France) C Pioline	6	6	7
10	(Netherlands) R Krajicek	3	2	5

Fourth round
Q	(Russia) M Safin	5	6	7^{7}	4	4
(France) C Pioline	7	4	6^{5}	6	6

==== Section 8 ====
First round
16	(Spain) A Berasategui	4	7^{9}	6	6
(South Africa) G Stafford	6	6^{7}	3	1
WC	(France) G Solvès	6	6	3	6^{5}	8
(United States) R Reneberg	4	2	6	7^{7}	6
(Slovakia) D Hrbatý	2	6	6	6
(United States) S Campbell	6	3	3	3
(Spain) J Sánchez	6^{6}	6	7	4	3
(Spain) JA Viloca	7^{8}	3	5	6	6
(Czech Republic) J Novák	0	2	6^{1}
(Morocco) H Arazi	6	6	7^{7}
(France) J Golmard	1	2	0
(France) N Escudé	6	6	6
(United States) J Tarango	6	6	7^{7}
(Netherlands) P Haarhuis	4	1	6^{4}
Q	(Argentina) M Zabaleta	6	6	3	4	6
2	(Czech Republic) P Korda	0	2	6	6	3

Second round
16	(Spain) A Berasategui	6	3	6	6
WC	(France) G Solvès	3	6	3	4
(Slovakia) D Hrbatý	6	6	6
(Spain) JA Viloca	3	3	3
(Morocco) H Arazi	6	6	6
(France) N Escudé	3	4	2
(United States) J Tarango	0	2	2
Q	(Argentina) M Zabaleta	6	6	6

Third round
16	(Spain) A Berasategui	6^{2}	6	7	7
(Slovakia) D Hrbatý	7^{7}	3	5	5
(Morocco) H Arazi	6	0	6	7^{7}
Q	(Argentina) M Zabaleta	4	6	4	6^{3}

Fourth round
16	(Spain) A Berasategui	2	4	6	3
(Morocco) H Arazi	6	6	3	6

Preceded by 1998 Australian Open – Men's singles	Grand Slam men's singles	Succeeded by 1998 Wimbledon Championships – Men's singles
