= 1998 French Open – Mixed doubles =

Tennis tournament

Mixed doubles
- 1998 French Open

Final
- Champions: (United States) Venus Williams (United States) Justin Gimelstob
- Runners-up: (United States) Serena Williams (Argentina) Luis Lobo
- Score: 6–4, 6–4

Details
- Draw: 48
- Seeds: 16

Events
Singles	men	women		boys	girls
Doubles	men	women	mixed	boys	girls
WC Singles	men	women	quad
WC Doubles	men	women	quad
Legends	−45	45+	women
- French Open

Venus Williams and Justin Gimelstob defeated Serena Williams and Luis Lobo in the final, 6–4, 6–4 to win the mixed doubles tennis title at the 1998 French Open.

Rika Hiraki and Mahesh Bhupathi were the defending champions, but chose not to compete together. Hiraki played with Paul Kilderry and lost in the third round, while Bhupathi played with Rennae Stubbs and lost in the second round.

== Seeds ==
All seeds received a bye into the second round.

1. (Latvia) Larisa Neiland / (India) Leander Paes (second round)
2. (Netherlands) Manon Bollegraf / (United States) Rick Leach (quarterfinals)
3. (Australia) Rennae Stubbs / (India) Mahesh Bhupathi (second round)
4. (United States) Lisa Raymond / (United States) Patrick Galbraith (third round)
5. (Czech Republic) Helena Suková / (Czech Republic) Cyril Suk (third round)
6. (Belarus) Natasha Zvereva / (Australia) Andrew Florent (second round)
7. (France) Alexandra Fusai / (South Africa) David Adams (second round)
8. (Argentina) Patricia Tarabini / (Argentina) Daniel Orsanic (second round)
9. (Netherlands) Miriam Oremans / (South Africa) Ellis Ferreira (second round)
10. (Australia) Rachel McQuillan / (Australia) David Macpherson (semifinals)
11. (Netherlands) Kristie Boogert / (United States) Donald Johnson (quarterfinals)
12. (Australia) Kristine Kunce / (United States) Francisco Montana (semifinals)
13. (Belgium) Sabine Appelmans / (South Africa) Piet Norval (second round)
14. (United States) Ginger Helgeson-Nielsen / (United States) Jim Grabb (third round)
15. (United States) Lori McNeil / (Australia) Joshua Eagle (quarterfinals)
16. (Netherlands) Caroline Vis / (South Africa) John-Laffnie de Jager (quarterfinals)

== Draw ==
Key

- Q = Qualifier
- WC = Wild card
- LL = Lucky loser
- Alt = Alternate
- ITF = ITF entry
- PR = Protected ranking
- SR = Special ranking
- SE = Special exempt
- JE = Junior exempt
- JR = Junior Accelerator Programme entrant
- CO = College Accelerator Programme entrant
- NG = Next Gen Accelerator Program entrant
- w/o = Walkover
- r = Retired
- d = Defaulted

=== Finals ===
Quarterfinals
(United States) Serena Williams (Argentina) Luis Lobo	6	7
11	(Netherlands) Kristie Boogert (United States) Donald Johnson	3	5
10	(Australia) Rachel McQuillan (Australia) David Macpherson	7^{8}	6
15	(United States) Lori McNeil (Australia) Joshua Eagle	6^{6}	1
(United States) Venus Williams (United States) Justin Gimelstob	6	6
16	(Netherlands) Caroline Vis (South Africa) John-Laffnie de Jager	4	3
12	(Australia) Kristine Kunce (United States) Francisco Montana	7	3	6
2	(Netherlands) Manon Bollegraf (United States) Rick Leach	5	6	2

Semifinals
(United States) Serena Williams (Argentina) Luis Lobo	6	6
10	(Australia) Rachel McQuillan (Australia) David Macpherson	1	0
(United States) Venus Williams (United States) Justin Gimelstob	6	6
12	(Australia) Kristine Kunce (United States) Francisco Montana	2	3

Final
(United States) Serena Williams (Argentina) Luis Lobo	4	4
(United States) Venus Williams (United States) Justin Gimelstob	6	6

=== Top half ===
==== Section 1 ====
First round
(Czech Republic) H Vildová (Czech Republic) P Vízner	3	2
(United States) S Williams (Argentina) L Lobo	6	6
(Russia) A Kournikova (The Bahamas) M Knowles	6	7^{7}
(South Africa) E de Villiers (South Africa) B Haygarth	2	6^{0}
(Argentina) L Montalvo (Argentina) M Hood	5	6	10
(Germany) B Rittner (Germany) K Braasch	7	2	8
(Argentina) F Labat (Mexico) D Roditi	7^{7}	6
(South Africa) L Horn (Sweden) P Nyborg	6^{4}	2

Second round
1	(Latvia) L Neiland (India) L Paes	6^{4}	3
(United States) S Williams (Argentina) L Lobo	7^{7}	6
(Russia) A Kournikova (The Bahamas) M Knowles	6	4	3
14	(United States) G Helgeson-Nielsen (United States) J Grabb	3	6	6
11	(Netherlands) K Boogert (United States) D Johnson	6	7^{8}
(Argentina) L Montalvo (Argentina) M Hood	2	6^{6}
(Argentina) F Labat (Mexico) D Roditi	0	3
5	(Czech Republic) H Suková (Czech Republic) C Suk	6	6

Third round
(United States) S Williams (Argentina) L Lobo	6	3	6
14	(United States) G Helgeson-Nielsen (United States) J Grabb	4	6	0
11	(Netherlands) K Boogert (United States) D Johnson	6	6
5	(Czech Republic) H Suková (Czech Republic) C Suk	2	3

Quarterfinals
(United States) S Williams (Argentina) L Lobo	6	7
11	(Netherlands) K Boogert (United States) D Johnson	3	5

==== Section 2 ====
First round
(Romania) C Cristea (United States) M Keil	5	6^{5}
(Australia) C Barclay (Australia) M Tebbutt	7	7^{7}
(Bulgaria) S Krivencheva (United States) B Coupe	6	3	6
(Slovakia) J Husárová (Belgium) T Vanhoudt	3	6	3
(United States) K Po (United States) J Waite	7	6
(United States) K Adams (South Africa) R Koenig	5	3
(Japan) R Hiraki (Australia) P Kilderry	3	6	6
(United States) D Graham (United States) L Jensen	6	2	2

Second round
4	(United States) L Raymond (United States) P Galbraith	7^{7}	7
(Australia) C Barclay (Australia) M Tebbutt	6^{4}	5
(Bulgaria) S Krivencheva (United States) B Coupe	4	7^{7}
10	(Australia) R McQuillan (Australia) D Macpherson	6	6^{3}	6
15	(United States) L McNeil (Australia) J Eagle	7	5	6
(United States) K Po (United States) J Waite	5	7	2
(Japan) R Hiraki (Australia) P Kilderry	6	2	6
7	(France) A Fusai (South Africa) D Adams	2	6	2

Third round
4	(United States) L Raymond (United States) P Galbraith	6^{4}	3
10	(Australia) R McQuillan (Australia) D Macpherson	7^{7}	6
15	(United States) L McNeil (Australia) J Eagle	6	6
(Japan) R Hiraki (Australia) P Kilderry	2	2

Quarterfinals
10	(Australia) R McQuillan (Australia) D Macpherson	7^{8}	6
15	(United States) L McNeil (Australia) J Eagle	6^{6}	1

=== Bottom half ===
==== Section 3 ====
First round
WC	(Germany) C Singer (South Africa) M Barnard	3	2
WC	(Croatia) I Majoli (United States) T Martin	6	6
(Ukraine) N Medvedeva (Netherlands) F Wibier	1	2
(United States) V Williams (United States) J Gimelstob	6	6
(Czech Republic) E Melicharová (North Macedonia) A Kitinov	6^{0}	2
(Ukraine) E Tatarkova (Australia) A Kratzmann	7^{7}	6
(Germany) C Schneider (Netherlands) S Noteboom	5	3
WC	(France) A-G Sidot (France) S Grosjean	7	6

Second round
6	(Belarus) N Zvereva (Australia) A Florent	4	6^{4}
WC	(Croatia) I Majoli (United States) T Martin	6	7^{7}
(United States) V Williams (United States) J Gimelstob	6	6
9	(Netherlands) M Oremans (South Africa) E Ferreira	4	4
16	(Netherlands) C Vis (South Africa) J-L de Jager	3
(Ukraine) E Tatarkova (Australia) A Kratzmann	3^{r}
WC	(France) A-G Sidot (France) S Grosjean	6	6
3	(Australia) R Stubbs (India) M Bhupathi	4	4

Third round
WC	(Croatia) I Majoli (United States) T Martin	0	6^{4}
(United States) V Williams (United States) J Gimelstob	6	7^{7}
16	(Netherlands) C Vis (South Africa) J-L de Jager	6^{2}	6	6
WC	(France) A-G Sidot (France) S Grosjean	7^{7}	2	3

Quarterfinals
(United States) V Williams (United States) J Gimelstob	6	6
16	(Netherlands) C Vis (South Africa) J-L de Jager	4	3

==== Section 4 ====
First round
(Italy) L Golarsa (Spain) J Alonso	5	2
(Argentina) M Paz (Argentina) P Albano	7	6
(South Africa) M de Swardt (United Kingdom) N Broad	6	6
(Russia) E Likhovtseva (Russia) A Olhovskiy	4	1
(Japan) N Miyagi (United States) K Kinnear	1	4
WC	(France) A Dechaume-Balleret (France) J-P Fleurian	6	6
WC	(France) A Mauresmo (France) J Golmard	7	3	2
(Indonesia) Y Basuki (Netherlands) T Nijssen	5	6	6

Second round
8	(Argentina) P Tarabini (Argentina) D Orsanic	6	2	5
(Argentina) M Paz (Argentina) P Albano	3	6	7
(South Africa) M de Swardt (United Kingdom) N Broad	4	7	5
12	(Australia) K Kunce (United States) F Montana	6	5	7
13	(Belgium) S Appelmans (South Africa) P Norval	6^{7}	2
WC	(France) A Dechaume-Balleret (France) J-P Fleurian	7^{9}	6
(Indonesia) Y Basuki (Netherlands) T Nijssen	3	6^{3}
2	(Netherlands) M Bollegraf (United States) R Leach	6	7^{7}

Third round
(Argentina) M Paz (Argentina) P Albano	6^{7}	2
12	(Australia) K Kunce (United States) F Montana	7^{9}	6
(France) A Dechaume-Balleret (France) J-P Fleurian	1	6	4
2	(Netherlands) M Bollegraf (United States) R Leach	6	2	6

Quarterfinals
12	(Australia) K Kunce (United States) F Montana	7	3	6
2	(Netherlands) M Bollegraf (United States) R Leach	5	6	2
