= 1998 French Open =

- Date: 25 May – 7 June 1998
- Edition: 97
- Category: 68th Grand Slam (ITF)
- Surface: Clay
- Location: Paris (XVI^{e}), France
- Venue: Stade Roland Garros

Champions

Men's singles
- (Spain) Carlos Moyá

Women's singles
- (Spain) Arantxa Sánchez Vicario

Men's doubles
- (Netherlands) Jacco Eltingh / (Netherlands) Paul Haarhuis

Women's doubles
- (Switzerland) Martina Hingis / (Czech Republic) Jana Novotná

Mixed doubles
- (United States) Venus Williams / (United States) Justin Gimelstob

Boys' singles
- (Chile) Fernando González

Girls' singles
- (Russia) Nadia Petrova

Boys' doubles
- (Venezuela) José de Armas / (Chile) Fernando González

Girls' doubles
- (Belgium) Kim Clijsters / (Australia) Jelena Dokić
- French Open

The 1998 French Open was a tennis tournament that took place on the outdoor clay courts at the Stade Roland Garros in Paris, France. The tournament was held from 25 May until 7 June. It was the 97th staging of the French Open, and the second Grand Slam tennis event of 1998.

== Seniors ==
=== Men's singles ===
(Spain) Carlos Moyá defeated (Spain) Àlex Corretja, 6–3, 7–5, 6–3

• It was Moyá's 1st and only career Grand Slam singles title.

=== Women's singles ===
(Spain) Arantxa Sánchez Vicario defeated (United States) Monica Seles, 7–6^{(7–5)}, 0–6, 6–2

• It was Sánchez's 4th and last career Grand Slam singles title and her 3rd title at the French Open.

=== Men's doubles ===
(Netherlands) Jacco Eltingh / (Netherlands) Paul Haarhuis defeated (The Bahamas) Mark Knowles / (Canada) Daniel Nestor, 6–3, 3–6, 6–3

• It was Eltingh's 5th career Grand Slam doubles title and his 2nd and last title at the French Open.
• It was Haarhuis' 4th career Grand Slam doubles title and his 2nd title at the French Open.

=== Women's doubles ===
(Switzerland) Martina Hingis / (Czech Republic) Jana Novotná defeated (United States) Lindsay Davenport / (Belarus) Natalia Zvereva, 6–1, 7–6^{(7–4)}

• It was Hingis' 4th career Grand Slam doubles title and her 1st title at the French Open.
• It was Novotná's 10th career Grand Slam doubles title and her 3rd and last title at the French Open.

=== Mixed doubles ===
(United States) Venus Williams / (United States) Justin Gimelstob defeated (United States) Serena Williams / (Argentina) Luis Lobo, 6–4, 6–4

• It was Williams' 2nd and last career Grand Slam mixed doubles title and her 1st title at the French Open.
• It was Gimelstob's 2nd and last career Grand Slam mixed doubles title.

== Juniors ==
=== Boys' singles ===
(Chile) Fernando González defeated (Spain) Juan Carlos Ferrero, 4–6, 6–4, 6–3

=== Girls' singles ===
(Russia) Nadia Petrova defeated (Australia) Jelena Dokić, 6–3, 6–3

=== Boys' doubles ===
(Venezuela) José de Armas / (Chile) Fernando González defeated (Spain) Juan Carlos Ferrero / (Spain) Feliciano López, 6–7, 7–5, 6–3

=== Girls' doubles ===
(Belgium) Kim Clijsters / (Australia) Jelena Dokić defeated (Russia) Elena Dementieva / (Russia) Nadia Petrova, 6–4, 7–6

== Notes ==
Preceded by 1998 Australian Open	Grand Slams	Succeeded by 1998 Wimbledon Championships
