= 1998 Wimbledon Championships – Men's singles qualifying =

Men's singles qualifying
- 1998 Wimbledon Championships

Events
Singles	men	women		boys	girls
Doubles	men	women	mixed	boys	girls
WC Singles	men	women	quad
WC Doubles	men	women	quad
Legends	men	women	seniors

Qualification
Singles	men	women
Doubles	men	women
- Wimbledon Championships

Players and pairs who neither have high enough rankings nor receive wild cards may participate in a qualifying tournament held one week before the annual Wimbledon Tennis Championships.

== Seeds ==
1. (United States) Alex O'Brien (qualified)
2. (France) Sébastien Grosjean (qualified)
3. (Germany) Christian Vinck (first round)
4. (Belgium) Christophe Van Garsse (qualifying competition, lucky loser)
5. (Germany) Lars Burgsmüller (second round)
6. (Finland) Tuomas Ketola (qualified)
7. (Australia) Sandon Stolle (second round)
8. (Spain) Óscar Burrieza (qualifying competition)
9. (United States) Michael Sell (second round)
10. (Germany) Michael Kohlmann (second round)
11. (Australia) Peter Tramacchi (qualifying competition)
12. (United States) Brian MacPhie (qualified)
13. (Slovakia) Ján Krošlák (first round)
14. (Switzerland) Ivo Heuberger (qualified)
15. (Australia) Lleyton Hewitt (first round)
16. (Germany) Alex Rădulescu (qualified)
17. (Australia) Todd Larkham (qualifying competition)
18. (South Africa) Neville Godwin (qualified)
19. (Mexico) Alejandro Hernández (qualifying competition)
20. (Czech Republic) David Rikl (first round)
21. (Italy) Stefano Pescosolido (qualified)
22. (Portugal) Nuno Marques (qualifying competition)
23. (Israel) Eyal Erlich (first round)
24. (United States) Wade McGuire (qualified)
25. (Czech Republic) Petr Luxa (first round)
26. (United States) Glenn Weiner (first round)
27. (France) Rodolphe Gilbert (second round)
28. (Austria) Gerald Mandl (first round)
29. (Belarus) Vladimir Voltchkov (qualified)
30. (Argentina) Gastón Etlis (second round)
31. (Federal Republic of Yugoslavia) Dušan Vemić (first round)
32. (United States) David Witt (first round)

== Qualifiers ==
1. (United States) Alex O'Brien
2. (France) Sébastien Grosjean
3. (Belarus) Vladimir Voltchkov
4. (India) Mahesh Bhupathi
5. (South Africa) David Nainkin
6. (Finland) Tuomas Ketola
7. (The Bahamas) Mark Knowles
8. (Australia) Mark Draper
9. (United States) Wade McGuire
10. (United States) David DiLucia
11. (Italy) Stefano Pescosolido
12. (United States) Brian MacPhie
13. (Italy) Daniele Bracciali
14. (Switzerland) Ivo Heuberger
15. (South Africa) Neville Godwin
16. (Germany) Alex Rădulescu

== Lucky loser ==
1. (Belgium) Christophe Van Garsse

== Qualifying draw ==
=== First qualifier ===
First round
1	(United States) Alex O'Brien	4	7	6
(Canada) Bobby Kokavec	6	6	3
(South Africa) Jeff Coetzee	6	6
(New Zealand) Mark Nielsen	4	4
(Australia) Grant Doyle	7	6
(South Africa) Damien Roberts	5	2
(Spain) Sergi Durán	6	6
31	(Federal Republic of Yugoslavia) Dušan Vemić	4	4

Second round
1	(United States) Alex O'Brien	6	6
(South Africa) Jeff Coetzee	4	0
(Australia) Grant Doyle	5	6	6
(Spain) Sergi Durán	7	1	3

Qualifying competition
1	(United States) Alex O'Brien	6	6
(Australia) Grant Doyle	3	2

=== Second qualifier ===
First round
2	(France) Sébastien Grosjean	6	6
(Switzerland) Lorenzo Manta	3	3
(Australia) Toby Mitchell	7	6
(Netherlands) Marc Merry	6	4
(Belgium) Dick Norman	2	1
(United States) Mark Merklein	6	6
(Sweden) Kalle Flygt	0	7	6
32	(United States) David Witt	6	6	1

Second round
2	(France) Sébastien Grosjean	6	6
(Australia) Toby Mitchell	3	3
(United States) Mark Merklein	6	7
(Sweden) Kalle Flygt	4	6

Qualifying competition
2	(France) Sébastien Grosjean	4	7	11
(United States) Mark Merklein	6	6	9

=== Third qualifier ===
First round
3	(Germany) Christian Vinck	6	3
(Israel) Amir Hadad	7	6
(Belarus) Max Mirnyi	7	6
(France) Stéphane Huet	6	2
(United States) Jared Palmer	6	6
(United Kingdom) Paul Hand	4	2
(United Kingdom) Luke Milligan	6	3	3
29	(Belarus) Vladimir Voltchkov	3	6	6

Second round
(Israel) Amir Hadad	7	6	6
(Belarus) Max Mirnyi	5	7	3
(United States) Jared Palmer	4	6
29	(Belarus) Vladimir Voltchkov	6	7

Qualifying competition
(Israel) Amir Hadad	3	6
29	(Belarus) Vladimir Voltchkov	6	7

=== Fourth qualifier ===
First round
4	(Belgium) Christophe Van Garsse	6	6
(South Africa) Kevin Ullyett	1	2
(Israel) Ofer Sela	6	6
WC	(Russia) Andrei Olhovskiy	3	2
(Germany) Andy Fahlke	1	2
(India) Mahesh Bhupathi	6	6
(United Kingdom) Jamie Delgado	6	6	2
30	(Argentina) Gastón Etlis	7	2	6

Second round
4	(Belgium) Christophe Van Garsse	6	6
(Israel) Ofer Sela	4	4
(India) Mahesh Bhupathi	6	6	12
30	(Argentina) Gastón Etlis	7	4	10

Qualifying competition
4	(Belgium) Christophe Van Garsse	6	2
(India) Mahesh Bhupathi	7	6

=== Fifth qualifier ===
First round
5	(Germany) Lars Burgsmüller	6	6
(Argentina) Leonardo Olguín	4	1
WC	(United Kingdom) Nick Weal	6	6
WC	(United Kingdom) Dan Lobb	1	2
(South Africa) David Nainkin	6	6
(United Kingdom) Nick Gould	3	3
(United Kingdom) Miles Maclagan	6	4	6
28	(Austria) Gerald Mandl	4	6	4

Second round
5	(Germany) Lars Burgsmüller	6	3	5
WC	(United Kingdom) Nick Weal	3	6	7
(South Africa) David Nainkin	7	6
(United Kingdom) Miles Maclagan	6	1

Qualifying competition
WC	(United Kingdom) Nick Weal	3	3
(South Africa) David Nainkin	6	6

=== Sixth qualifier ===
First round
6	(Finland) Tuomas Ketola	6	6
(Japan) Takao Suzuki	3	4
(France) Jean-Philippe Fleurian	3	4
(Belarus) Alexander Shvets	6	6
(Australia) James Sekulov	3	2
(Sweden) Fredrik Lovén	6	6
(United States) Michael Joyce	2	5
27	(France) Rodolphe Gilbert	6	7

Second round
6	(Finland) Tuomas Ketola	7	6
(Belarus) Alexander Shvets	5	4
(Sweden) Fredrik Lovén	5	7	6
27	(France) Rodolphe Gilbert	7	6	2

Qualifying competition
6	(Finland) Tuomas Ketola	6	6	6
(Sweden) Fredrik Lovén	7	4	4

=== Seventh qualifier ===
First round
7	(Australia) Sandon Stolle	6	6
(France) Jean-François Bachelot	3	1
WC	(The Bahamas) Mark Knowles	6	7
(Australia) Wayne Arthurs	3	6
WC	(United Kingdom) Andrew Foster	6	1
(Australia) Ben Ellwood	7	6
(Japan) Kentaro Masuda	6	4	7
26	(United States) Glenn Weiner	2	6	5

Second round
7	(Australia) Sandon Stolle	3	4
WC	(The Bahamas) Mark Knowles	6	6
(Australia) Ben Ellwood	7	6
(Japan) Kentaro Masuda	5	4

Qualifying competition
WC	(The Bahamas) Mark Knowles	6	6	6
(Australia) Ben Ellwood	7	3	1

=== Eighth qualifier ===
First round
8	(Spain) Óscar Burrieza	7	2	6
(Italy) Mosé Navarra	6	6	3
(Argentina) Gastón Gaudio	7	4	1
(France) Sébastien de Chaunac	5	6	6
(South Africa) Wesley Whitehouse	7	6
WC	(United Kingdom) Ben Haran	5	2
(Australia) Mark Draper	7	6
25	(Czech Republic) Petr Luxa	6	4

Second round
8	(Spain) Óscar Burrieza	6	6
(France) Sébastien de Chaunac	1	2
(South Africa) Wesley Whitehouse	7	3	4
(Australia) Mark Draper	6	6	6

Qualifying competition
8	(Spain) Óscar Burrieza	6	5
(Australia) Mark Draper	7	7

=== Ninth qualifier ===
First round
9	(United States) Michael Sell	2	6	6
(South Africa) Chris Haggard	6	3	4
(Australia) Michael Hill	6	6
(Argentina) Agustín Calleri	4	3
(Argentina) Damián Furmanski	1	3
(Netherlands) Martijn Belgraver	6	6
(France) Grégory Carraz	6	4	1
24	(United States) Wade McGuire	3	6	6

Second round
9	(United States) Michael Sell	3	6
(Australia) Michael Hill	6	7
(Netherlands) Martijn Belgraver	6	2	4
24	(United States) Wade McGuire	4	6	6

Qualifying competition
(Australia) Michael Hill	3	4
24	(United States) Wade McGuire	6	6

=== Tenth qualifier ===
First round
10	(Germany) Michael Kohlmann	7	6
WC	(United Kingdom) Tom Spinks	6	3
(Ivory Coast) Valentin Sanon	4	1
(United States) David DiLucia	6	6
(Japan) Yaoki Ishii	6	6
(Italy) Elia Grossi	4	1
(Argentina) Andrés Zingman	3	6	6
23	(Israel) Eyal Erlich	6	4	4

Second round
10	(Germany) Michael Kohlmann	3	6	2
(United States) David DiLucia	6	2	6
(Japan) Yaoki Ishii	3	6	3
(Argentina) Andrés Zingman	6	1	6

Qualifying competition
(United States) David DiLucia	6	6	6
(Argentina) Andrés Zingman	7	2	2

=== Eleventh qualifier ===
First round
11	(Australia) Peter Tramacchi	6	4	6
(Australia) Jamie Holmes	2	6	4
(Czech Republic) David Škoch	6	6
(Australia) Jurek Stasiak	4	4
(South Africa) Vaughan Snyman	6	6
(Israel) Harel Levy	3	4
(United States) Tommy Ho	1	0
21	(Italy) Stefano Pescosolido	6	6

Second round
11	(Australia) Peter Tramacchi	6	6
(Czech Republic) David Škoch	2	1
(South Africa) Vaughan Snyman	3	4
21	(Italy) Stefano Pescosolido	6	6

Qualifying competition
11	(Australia) Peter Tramacchi	7	5	10
21	(Italy) Stefano Pescosolido	6	7	12

=== Twelfth qualifier ===
First round
12	(United States) Brian MacPhie	6	7
(Austria) Julian Knowle	1	5
(Czech Republic) Leoš Friedl	6	6
(United States) Bill Behrens	7	7
(United Kingdom) Arvind Parmar	3	6
(Netherlands) Rogier Wassen	6	7
WC	(United Kingdom) Ross Matheson	6	3
22	(Portugal) Nuno Marques	7	6

Second round
12	(United States) Brian MacPhie	5
(United States) Bill Behrens	2^{r}
(Netherlands) Rogier Wassen	1	4
22	(Portugal) Nuno Marques	6	6

Qualifying competition
12	(United States) Brian MacPhie	6	6
22	(Portugal) Nuno Marques	4	4

=== Thirteenth qualifier ===
First round
13	(Slovakia) Ján Krošlák	3	4
(France) Pier Gauthier	6	6
WC	(United Kingdom) James Fox	6	7
(Brazil) Adriano Ferreira	4	6
(France) Julien Varlet	2	3
(Italy) Daniele Bracciali	6	6
(France) Frédéric Fontang	6	6
20	(Czech Republic) David Rikl	3	4

Second round
(France) Pier Gauthier	3	5
WC	(United Kingdom) James Fox	6	7
(Italy) Daniele Bracciali	6	6
(France) Frédéric Fontang	3	4

Qualifying competition
WC	(United Kingdom) James Fox	6	4
(Italy) Daniele Bracciali	7	6

=== Fourteenth qualifier ===
First round
14	(Switzerland) Ivo Heuberger	7	7
(Germany) Arne Thoms	6	6
(Sweden) Simon Aspelin	4	6
(United States) Jim Thomas	6	7
(Romania) Gabriel Trifu	7	7
(France) Antony Dupuis	6	6
(Australia) Steven Randjelovic	4	2
19	(Mexico) Alejandro Hernández	6	6

Second round
14	(Switzerland) Ivo Heuberger	7	6
(United States) Jim Thomas	5	3
(Romania) Gabriel Trifu	2	6	1
19	(Mexico) Alejandro Hernández	6	2	6

Qualifying competition
14	(Switzerland) Ivo Heuberger	6	6
19	(Mexico) Alejandro Hernández	1	4

=== Fifteenth qualifier ===
First round
15	(Australia) Lleyton Hewitt	6	5
(Sweden) Nicklas Kulti	7	7
(Germany) Kacper Cecek	6	2
(Japan) Satoshi Iwabuchi	7	6
(Denmark) Frederik Fetterlein	3	3
(United States) Doug Flach	6	6
(Sweden) Fredrik Jonsson	6	3
18	(South Africa) Neville Godwin	7	6

Second round
(Sweden) Nicklas Kulti	6	6	7
(Japan) Satoshi Iwabuchi	7	4	9
(United States) Doug Flach	6	3	2
18	(South Africa) Neville Godwin	2	6	6

Qualifying competition
(Japan) Satoshi Iwabuchi	5	6	1
18	(South Africa) Neville Godwin	7	0	6

=== Sixteenth qualifier ===
First round
16	(Germany) Alex Rădulescu	6	6
(Brazil) Roberto Jabali	3	1
(Switzerland) Filippo Veglio	4	4
(Israel) Oren Motevassel	6	6
(Mexico) Marco Osorio	7	6
(France) Slimane Saoudi	6	0
(France) Julien Boutter	1	0^{r}
17	(Australia) Todd Larkham	6	0

Second round
16	(Germany) Alex Rădulescu	6	4	6
(Israel) Oren Motevassel	2	6	4
(Mexico) Marco Osorio	0	6	5
17	(Australia) Todd Larkham	6	4	7

Qualifying competition
16	(Germany) Alex Rădulescu	6	6	6
17	(Australia) Todd Larkham	4	7	4
