= 1998 Wimbledon Championships – Men's doubles qualifying =

Men's doubles qualifying
- 1998 Wimbledon Championships

Events
Singles	men	women		boys	girls
Doubles	men	women	mixed	boys	girls
WC Singles	men	women	quad
WC Doubles	men	women	quad
Legends	men	women	seniors

Qualification
Singles	men	women
Doubles	men	women
- Wimbledon Championships

Players and pairs who neither have high enough rankings nor receive wild cards may participate in a qualifying tournament held one week before the annual Wimbledon Tennis Championships.

== Seeds ==
1. (Australia) Jamie Holmes / (Australia) Andrew Painter (qualified)
2. (Germany) Michael Kohlmann / (South Africa) Myles Wakefield (second round)
3. (Italy) Stefano Pescosolido / (Switzerland) Filippo Veglio (first round)
4. (United States) Jim Thomas / (Netherlands) Rogier Wassen (first round)
5. (Mexico) Alejandro Hernández / (Mexico) Bernardo Martínez (second round)
6. (Czech Republic) Petr Luxa / (Czech Republic) David Škoch (qualified)

== Qualifiers ==
1. (Australia) Jamie Holmes / (Australia) Andrew Painter
2. (United Kingdom) Ross Matheson / (United Kingdom) Nick Weal
3. (Czech Republic) Petr Luxa / (Czech Republic) David Škoch

== Qualifying draw ==
=== First qualifier ===
First round
1	(Australia) Jamie Holmes (Australia) Andrew Painter	6	6
WC	(United Kingdom) James Fox (United Kingdom) James Trotman	1	3
(Israel) Harel Levy (Netherlands) Marc Merry	6	2
(Israel) Eyal Erlich (Italy) Mosé Navarra	7	6
(United States) Michael Joyce (Australia) Brent Larkham	7	6	6
(Austria) Gerald Mandl (Switzerland) Lorenzo Manta	6	7	4
(South Africa) Jeff Coetzee (South Africa) Damien Roberts	6	6
4	(United States) Jim Thomas (Netherlands) Rogier Wassen	2	3

Second round
1	(Australia) Jamie Holmes (Australia) Andrew Painter	4	6	8
(Israel) Eyal Erlich (Italy) Mosé Navarra	6	4	6
(United States) Michael Joyce (Australia) Brent Larkham	4	2
(South Africa) Jeff Coetzee (South Africa) Damien Roberts	6	6

Qualifying competition
1	(Australia) Jamie Holmes (Australia) Andrew Painter	6	6	6
(South Africa) Jeff Coetzee (South Africa) Damien Roberts	1	7	4

=== Second qualifier ===
First round
2	(Germany) Michael Kohlmann (South Africa) Myles Wakefield	6	6	6
(Canada) Bobby Kokavec (Mexico) Marco Osorio	7	4	4
(Romania) Gabriel Trifu (Federal Republic of Yugoslavia) Dušan Vemić	6	3
WC	(United Kingdom) Ross Matheson (United Kingdom) Nick Weal	7	6
(Sweden) Fredrik Bergh (Sweden) Rikard Bergh	7	6
(United States) Jared Palmer (United States) David Witt	6	4
(Australia) Grant Doyle (Australia) Ben Ellwood	w/o
5	(Mexico) Alejandro Hernández (Mexico) Bernardo Martínez

Second round
2	(Germany) Michael Kohlmann (South Africa) Myles Wakefield	3	4
WC	(United Kingdom) Ross Matheson (United Kingdom) Nick Weal	6	6
(Sweden) Fredrik Bergh (Sweden) Rikard Bergh	6	6
5	(Mexico) Alejandro Hernández (Mexico) Bernardo Martínez	3	1

Qualifying competition
WC	(United Kingdom) Ross Matheson (United Kingdom) Nick Weal	3	6	6
(Sweden) Fredrik Bergh (Sweden) Rikard Bergh	6	2	2

=== Third qualifier ===
First round
3	(Italy) Stefano Pescosolido (Switzerland) Filippo Veglio	6	6
(France) Grégory Carraz (Argentina) Gastón Etlis	7	7
(Australia) Lleyton Hewitt (Australia) Todd Larkham	6	5	4
(Australia) Mark Draper (Australia) Toby Mitchell	2	7	6
(South Africa) David Nainkin (South Africa) Wesley Whitehouse	6	7
(Puerto Rico) José Frontera (Japan) Takao Suzuki	3	6
(Brazil) Adriano Ferreira (United States) Charlie Singer	4	6
6	(Czech Republic) Petr Luxa (Czech Republic) David Škoch	6	7

Second round
(France) Grégory Carraz (Argentina) Gastón Etlis	7	6
(Australia) Mark Draper (Australia) Toby Mitchell	5	3
(South Africa) David Nainkin (South Africa) Wesley Whitehouse	4	5
6	(Czech Republic) Petr Luxa (Czech Republic) David Škoch	6	7

Qualifying competition
(France) Grégory Carraz (Argentina) Gastón Etlis	4	1
6	(Czech Republic) Petr Luxa (Czech Republic) David Škoch	6	6
