= 1998 Wimbledon Championships – Women's singles qualifying =

Women's singles qualifying
- 1998 Wimbledon Championships

Events
Singles	men	women		boys	girls
Doubles	men	women	mixed	boys	girls
WC Singles	men	women	quad
WC Doubles	men	women	quad
Legends	men	women	seniors

Qualification
Singles	men	women
Doubles	men	women
- Wimbledon Championships

Players and pairs who neither have high enough rankings nor receive wild cards may participate in a qualifying tournament held one week before the annual Wimbledon Tennis Championships.

The qualifying rounds for the 1998 Wimbledon Championships were played from 15 to 21 May 1998 at the Civil Service Sports Ground in Chiswick, London, Great Britain.

== Seeds ==
1. (Zimbabwe) Cara Black (qualified)
2. (Japan) Haruka Inoue (qualified)
3. (United States) Karin Miller (qualifying competition, lucky loser)
4. (United States) Jolene Watanabe (second round)
5. (Germany) Sandra Klösel (first round)
6. (France) Émilie Loit (first round)
7. (Belgium) Els Callens (qualified)
8. (Spain) Conchita Martínez Granados (first round)
9. (Czech Republic) Radka Bobková (qualified)
10. (United States) Lilia Osterloh (qualifying competition, lucky loser)
11. (United States) Meghann Shaughnessy (first round)
12. (Australia) Annabel Ellwood (qualifying competition)
13. (Japan) Shinobu Asagoe (first round)
14. (Luxembourg) Anne Kremer (qualifying competition)
15. (Belgium) Laurence Courtois (second round)
16. (Romania) Raluca Sandu (first round)

== Qualifiers ==
1. (Zimbabwe) Cara Black
2. (Croatia) Silvija Talaja
3. (Czech Republic) Radka Bobková
4. (South Africa) Surina de Beer
5. (Belgium) Els Callens
6. (Germany) Miriam Schnitzer
7. (Australia) Rennae Stubbs
8. (Japan) Haruka Inoue

== Lucky losers ==
1. (United States) Karin Miller
2. (United States) Lilia Osterloh

== Qualifying draw ==
=== First qualifier ===
First round
1	(Zimbabwe) Cara Black	6	6
(Germany) Veronika Martinek	1	0
(Spain) Eva Bes	3	6	8
WC	(United Kingdom) Claire Lyte	6	4	6
(Paraguay) Larissa Schaerer	0	3
(Australia) Kristine Kunce	6	6
(France) Noëlle van Lottum	7^{7}	3	5
12	(Australia) Annabel Ellwood	6^{5}	6	7

Second round
1	(Zimbabwe) Cara Black	6	7^{7}
(Spain) Eva Bes	3	6^{2}
(Australia) Kristine Kunce	3	6	2
12	(Australia) Annabel Ellwood	6	1	6

Qualifying competition
1	(Zimbabwe) Cara Black	6	6
12	(Australia) Annabel Ellwood	1	2

=== Second qualifier ===
First round
15	(Belgium) Laurence Courtois	6	5	6
(Australia) Catherine Barclay	2	7	4
(Belgium) Daphne van de Zande	1	1
(Italy) Adriana Serra Zanetti	6	6
(Czech Republic) Ludmila Richterová	6^{5}	3
(Canada) Martina Nejedly	7^{7}	6
(Croatia) Silvija Talaja	6	6
5	(Germany) Sandra Klösel	1	4

Second round
15	(Belgium) Laurence Courtois	6	3	2
(Italy) Adriana Serra Zanetti	2	6	6
(Canada) Martina Nejedly	0	2
(Croatia) Silvija Talaja	6	6

Qualifying competition
(Italy) Adriana Serra Zanetti	2	5
(Croatia) Silvija Talaja	6	7

=== Third qualifier ===
First round
3	(United States) Karin Miller	6	6
(United States) Mashona Washington	2	4
(Italy) Tathiana Garbin	6	7^{7}
(Spain) Alicia Ortuño	4	6^{5}
(United States) Brie Rippner	2	4
(Greece) Christína Papadáki	6	6
WC	(United Kingdom) Abigail Tordoff	4	2
9	(Czech Republic) Radka Bobková	6	6

Second round
3	(United States) Karin Miller	1	6	6
(Italy) Tathiana Garbin	6	3	3
(Greece) Christína Papadáki	2	7	3
9	(Czech Republic) Radka Bobková	6	5	6

Qualifying competition
3	(United States) Karin Miller	1	3
9	(Czech Republic) Radka Bobková	6	6

=== Fourth qualifier ===
First round
13	(Japan) Shinobu Asagoe	6	2	1
(Poland) Aleksandra Olsza	3	6	6
(South Korea) Kim Eun-ha	2	6^{5}
(Belgium) Nancy Feber	6	7^{7}
(South Africa) Liezel Horn	3	1
(Slovenia) Tina Križan	6	6
(South Africa) Surina de Beer	6	6
8	(Spain) Conchita Martínez Granados	3	1

Second round
(Poland) Aleksandra Olsza	6	6
(Belgium) Nancy Feber	1	3
(Slovenia) Tina Križan	4	1
(South Africa) Surina de Beer	6	6

Qualifying competition
(Poland) Aleksandra Olsza	5	6	1
(South Africa) Surina de Beer	7	3	6

=== Fifth qualifier ===
First round
7	(Belgium) Els Callens	6	6
WC	(United Kingdom) Amanda Janes	3	1
(Colombia) Fabiola Zuluaga	2	6	8
(Bulgaria) Svetlana Krivencheva	6	3	10
(France) Caroline Dhenin	6	6
WC	(United Kingdom) Louise Herbert	1	2
(Germany) Wiltrud Probst	5	1
14	(Luxembourg) Anne Kremer	7	6

Second round
7	(Belgium) Els Callens	6	6
(Bulgaria) Svetlana Krivencheva	3	4
(France) Caroline Dhenin	1	1
14	(Luxembourg) Anne Kremer	6	6

Qualifying competition
7	(Belgium) Els Callens	7^{7}	6
14	(Luxembourg) Anne Kremer	6^{3}	1

=== Sixth qualifier ===
First round
10	(United States) Lilia Osterloh	5	6	6
(United States) Lindsay Lee	7	3	0
WC	(United Kingdom) Joanne Moore	6^{2}	6^{2}
(Germany) Julia Abe	7^{7}	7^{7}
(Czech Republic) Lenka Cenková	2	4
(Germany) Miriam Schnitzer	6	6
WC	(United Kingdom) Lucie Ahl	4	6	4
4	(United States) Jolene Watanabe	6	4	6

Second round
10	(United States) Lilia Osterloh	6	6
(Germany) Julia Abe	1	3
(Germany) Miriam Schnitzer	5	6	6
4	(United States) Jolene Watanabe	7	4	1

Qualifying competition
10	(United States) Lilia Osterloh	6^{2}	2
(Germany) Miriam Schnitzer	7^{7}	6

=== Seventh qualifier ===
First round
6	(France) Émilie Loit	4	6^{0}
(Canada) Maureen Drake	6	7^{7}
(South Africa) Jessica Steck	5	2
PR	(Australia) Rennae Stubbs	7	6
PR	(Netherlands) Petra Kamstra	7^{7}	2	5
(France) Laurence Andretto	6^{5}	6	7
PR	(Germany) Christina Singer	6	6
16	(Romania) Raluca Sandu	2	4

Second round
(Canada) Maureen Drake	0	2
PR	(Australia) Rennae Stubbs	6	6
(France) Laurence Andretto	2	2
PR	(Germany) Christina Singer	6	6

Qualifying competition
PR	(Australia) Rennae Stubbs	7^{7}	7^{7}
PR	(Germany) Christina Singer	6^{5}	6^{4}

=== Eighth qualifier ===
First round
11	(United States) Meghann Shaughnessy	3	6^{3}
WC	(United Kingdom) Kate Warne-Holland	6	7^{7}
(India) Nirupama Vaidyanathan	1	4
(Federal Republic of Yugoslavia) Sandra Načuk	6	6
(United States) Erika deLone	0	4
(Australia) Siobhan Drake-Brockman	6	6
WC	(United Kingdom) Hannah Collin	6	3	1
2	(Japan) Haruka Inoue	3	6	6

Second round
WC	(United Kingdom) Kate Warne-Holland	2	3
(Federal Republic of Yugoslavia) Sandra Načuk	6	6
(Australia) Siobhan Drake-Brockman	5	5
2	(Japan) Haruka Inoue	7	7

Qualifying competition
(Federal Republic of Yugoslavia) Sandra Načuk	4	3
2	(Japan) Haruka Inoue	6	6
