= 1998 Wimbledon Championships – Women's doubles qualifying =

Women's doubles qualifying
- 1998 Wimbledon Championships

Events
Singles	men	women		boys	girls
Doubles	men	women	mixed	boys	girls
WC Singles	men	women	quad
WC Doubles	men	women	quad
Legends	men	women	seniors

Qualification
Singles	men	women
Doubles	men	women
- Wimbledon Championships

Players and pairs who neither have high enough rankings nor receive wild cards may participate in a qualifying tournament held one week before the annual Wimbledon Tennis Championships.

The qualifying rounds for the 1998 Wimbledon Championships were played from 15 to 21 June 1998 at the Civil Service Sports Ground in Chiswick, London, United Kingdom.

== Seeds ==
1. (Zimbabwe) Cara Black / (Kazakhstan) Irina Selyutina (qualified)
2. (Greece) Christína Papadáki / (United States) Samantha Reeves (first round)
3. (Venezuela) Melissa Mazzotta / (Colombia) Fabiola Zuluaga (first round)
4. (Japan) Haruka Inoue / (Paraguay) Larissa Schaerer (second round)

== Qualifiers ==
1. (Zimbabwe) Cara Black / (Kazakhstan) Irina Selyutina
2. (Canada) Maureen Drake / (United States) Lilia Osterloh

== Lucky losers ==
1. (United States) Brie Rippner / (South Africa) Jessica Steck
2. (Italy) Tathiana Garbin / (Italy) Adriana Serra Zanetti

== Qualifying draw ==
=== First qualifier ===
First round
1	(Zimbabwe) Cara Black (Kazakhstan) Irina Selyutina	6	6
(Spain) Conchita Martínez Granados (France) Catherine Tanvier	0	0
(Argentina) Mariana Díaz Oliva (Spain) Marina Escobar	5	3
(Sweden) Åsa Carlsson (Romania) Raluca Sandu	7	6
4	(Japan) Haruka Inoue (Paraguay) Larissa Schaerer	3	6	6
(Germany) Sandra Klösel (India) Nirupama Vaidyanathan	6	3	2
(Czech Republic) Lenka Cenková (Czech Republic) Ludmila Richterová	4	4
(United States) Brie Rippner (South Africa) Jessica Steck	6	6

Second round
1	(Zimbabwe) Cara Black (Kazakhstan) Irina Selyutina	6	6
(Sweden) Åsa Carlsson (Romania) Raluca Sandu	2	1
4	(Japan) Haruka Inoue (Paraguay) Larissa Schaerer	3	3
(United States) Brie Rippner (South Africa) Jessica Steck	6	6

Qualifying competition
1	(Zimbabwe) Cara Black (Kazakhstan) Irina Selyutina	1	6	6
(United States) Brie Rippner (South Africa) Jessica Steck	6	4	1

=== Second qualifier ===
First round
(Federal Republic of Yugoslavia) Sandra Načuk (Sweden) Kristina Triska	6	6
WC	(United Kingdom) Hannah Collin (United Kingdom) Abigail Tordoff	3	3
(Italy) Tathiana Garbin (Italy) Adriana Serra Zanetti	6	6
3	(Venezuela) Melissa Mazzotta (Colombia) Fabiola Zuluaga	3	4
(United States) Karin Miller (United States) Mashona Washington	6	3	3
(Canada) Maureen Drake (United States) Lilia Osterloh	4	6	6
(Japan) Saori Obata (Japan) Kaoru Shibata	6	7
2	(Greece) Christína Papadáki (United States) Samantha Reeves	4	5

Second round
(Federal Republic of Yugoslavia) Sandra Načuk (Sweden) Kristina Triska	5	6	3
(Italy) Tathiana Garbin (Italy) Adriana Serra Zanetti	7	3	6
(Canada) Maureen Drake (United States) Lilia Osterloh	6	6
(Japan) Saori Obata (Japan) Kaoru Shibata	4	2

Qualifying competition
(Italy) Tathiana Garbin (Italy) Adriana Serra Zanetti	2	2
(Canada) Maureen Drake (United States) Lilia Osterloh	6	6
