= Jean-Michel Pequery =

French tennis player

Jean-Michel Péquery
- Country (sports): France
- Residence: Boulogne-sur-Mer, France
- Born: 30 May 1978 (age 48) Mulhouse, France
- Height: 1.83 m (6 ft 0 in)
- Turned pro: 1998
- Retired: 2007
- Plays: Right-handed (two-handed backhand)
- Prize money: $151,777

Singles
- Career record: 0–0
- Career titles: 0
- Highest ranking: No. 180 (20 September 2004)

Grand Slam singles results
- Australian Open: -
- French Open: -
- Wimbledon: -
- US Open: -

Doubles
- Career record: 0–2
- Career titles: 0
- Highest ranking: No. 256 (20 September 2004)

Grand Slam doubles results
- Australian Open: -
- French Open: 1R (1998)
- Wimbledon: -
- US Open: -

Jean-Michel Péquery (born May 30, 1978) is a French retired professional tennis player. During his career, he competed exclusively in Challengers and Futures tournaments, except for two showings (for two first-round losses) in the doubles main draw of ATP Tour-level tournaments. One of these was to remain his sole appearance at a Grand Slam and came at the 1998 French Open when he alongside Julien Boutter received a wild card to compete in the doubles tournament. They fell to Jim Grabb and David Macpherson 6–3, 7–6.

== Challengers and Futures finals ==
=== Singles: 15 (9–6) ===
Legend (singles)
Challengers (0–1)
Futures (9–5)

Outcome	No.	Date	Tournament	Surface	Opponent in the final	Score in the final
Runner-up	1.	October 11, 1999	Saint-Dizier, France	Hard	(France) Michaël Llodra	3–6, 6–2, 2–6
Winner	1.	October 25, 1999	Rodez, France	Hard	(France) Philippe Pasquier	6–1, 7–6
Winner	2.	October 30, 2000	Rodez, France	Hard	(Slovakia) Martin Hromec	^{8}6–7, 6–3, 6–4
Runner-up	2.	January 29, 2001	Deauville, France	Clay	(France) Paul-Henri Mathieu	3–6, 5–7
Winner	3.	September 30, 2002	Nevers, France	Hard	(United States) Andres Pedroso	6–4, 6–2
Winner	4.	September 15, 2003	Mulhouse, France	Hard	(United Kingdom) Jamie Delgado	7–5, 4–6, 6–4
Winner	5.	September 22, 2003	Plaisir, France	Hard	(Czech Republic) Jan Minář	7–5, 7–6^{9}
Winner	6.	September 29, 2003	Nevers, France	Hard	(France) Sébastien de Chaunac	6–4, 6–4
Winner	7.	March 8, 2004	Lille, France	Hard	(Italy) Uros Vico	6–4, 6–4
Winner	8.	April 19, 2004	Doha, Qatar	Hard	(Slovakia) Ladislav Švarc	6–3, 6–3
Winner	9.	April 26, 2004	Doha, Qatar	Hard	(Slovakia) Ladislav Švarc	6–0, ^{4}6–7, 6–1
Runner-up	3.	July 19, 2004	Valladolid, Spain	Hard	(France) Nicolas Mahut	3–6, 6–3, 5–6, ret.
Runner-up	4.	January 24, 2005	Feucherolles, France	Hard	(Belgium) Steve Darcis	4–6, ^{1}6–7
Runner-up	5.	March 29, 2005	Bath, United Kingdom	Hard	(Czech Republic) Petr Krallert	^{2}6–7, 2–6
Runner-up	6.	October 3, 2005	Nevers, France	Hard	(Romania) Florin Mergea	^{4}6–7, 7–6^{2}, 2–6

=== Doubles: 21 (13–8) ===
Legend
Challengers (1–2)
Futures (12–6)

Outcome	No.	Date	Tournament	Surface	Partner	Opponents in the final	Score in the final
Runner-up	1.	February 9, 1998	Bergheim, Austria	Carpet	(France) Julien Boutter	(Germany) Markus Menzler (Germany) Markus Wislsperger	6–4, 1–6, 0–6
Runner-up	2.	May 4, 1998	Cardiff, United Kingdom	Clay	(Netherlands) Marc Merry	(United Kingdom) Nick Gould (United Kingdom) Tom Spinks	2–6, 0–6
Runner-up	3.	April 21, 1999	Jakarta, Indonesia	Hard	(France) Jean-François Bachelot	(Indonesia) Sulistyo Wibowo (Indonesia) Bonit Wiryawan	3–6, 6–3, 5–7
Winner	1.	July 5, 1999	Bourg-en-Bresse, France	Clay	(France) Maxime Boyé	(United States) Hugo Armando (United States) Minh Le	w/o
Winner	2.	October 4, 1999	Sarreguemines, France	Carpet	(France) Régis Lavergne	(Belgium) Olivier Patience (Belgium) Olivier Rochus	6–4, 6–4
Winner	3.	October 11, 1999	Saint-Dizier, France	Hard	(France) Michaël Llodra	(Belgium) David Basile (Belgium) Arnaud Fontaine	6–3, 6–3
Runner-up	4.	May 15, 2000	Casablanca, Morocco	Clay	(France) Nicolas Thomann	(Australia) Ashley Ford (Australia) Jordan Kerr	3–6, 2–6
Winner	4.	May 29, 2000	Dublin, Ireland	Carpet	(Belgium) Gilles Elseneer	(Finland) Jarkko Nieminen (Denmark) Kristian Pless	7–6^{2}, 4–6, 6–3
Winner	5.	May 26, 2003	Marrakesh, Morocco	Clay	(France) Fabrice Bétencourt	(Ivory Coast) Claude N'Goran (Ivory Coast) Valentin Sanon	6–4, 6–4
Winner	6.	September 15, 2003	Mulhouse, France	Hard	(France) Gary Lugassy	(Germany) Michael Berrer (Switzerland) Roman Valent	6–0, 6–2
Runner-up	5.	September 22, 2003	Plaisir, France	Hard	(Algeria) Slimane Saoudi	(United States) Eric Butorac (Serbia and Montenegro) Petar Popović	w/o
Winner	7.	January 28, 2004	Feucherolles, France	Hard	(France) Nicolas Tourte	(France) Stéphane Huet (France) Éric Prodon	7–6^{6}, 6–4
Winner	8.	March 8, 2004	Lille, France	Hard	(France) Jean-François Bachelot	(France) Marc Gicquel (France) Édouard Roger-Vasselin	7–6^{4}, 6–3
Runner-up	6.	April 26, 2004	Doha, Qatar	Hard	(India) Rohan Bopanna	(India) Mustafa Ghouse (India) Harsh Mankad	1–6, ret.
Runner-up	7.	September 13, 2004	Tehran, Iran	Clay	(Germany) Frank Moser	(Austria) Oliver Marach (Switzerland) Jean-Claude Scherrer	0–6, 0–6
Winner	9.	September 20, 2004	Plaisir, France	Hard	(France) Jean-François Bachelot	(France) Marc Auradou (France) Arnaud Delgado	6–2, 6–0
Winner	10.	January 24, 2005	Feucherolles, France	Hard	(France) Josselin Ouanna	(France) Patrice Atias (France) Jonathan Hilaire	7–6^{1}, 6–3
Runner-up	8.	July 5, 2005	Nottingham, United Kingdom	Grass	(Pakistan) Aisam-ul-Haq Qureshi	(United Kingdom) Joshua Goodall (United Kingdom) Martin Lee	4–6, ^{0}6–7
Winner	11.	October 3, 2005	Nevers, France	Hard	(France) Julien Jeanpierre	(United Kingdom) David Sherwood (United Kingdom) Kyle Spencer	6–4, ^{7}6–7, 7–5
Winner	12.	April 3, 2006	Bath, United Kingdom	Hard	(France) Jean-François Bachelot	(France) Olivier Charroin (France) Nicolas Tourte	4–6, 6–4, 6–3
Winner	13.	April 24, 2006	Lanzarote, Spain	Hard	(France) Grégory Carraz	(Germany) Benedikt Dorsch (Netherlands) Steven Korteling	6–3, 7–5
