= Haruka Inoue =

Japanese tennis player (born 1977)

- Full name: Haruka Inoue
- Country (sports): Japan
- Born: 7 June 1977 (age 48); Tokyo, Japan
- Height: 1.68 m (5 ft 6 in)
- Plays: Right-handed
- Prize money: $206,194

Singles
- Career record: 188–151
- Career titles: 2 ITF
- Highest ranking: No. 108 (17 August 1998)

Grand Slam singles results
- Australian Open: 1R (1998)
- French Open: 1R (1998)
- Wimbledon: 1R (1997, 1998)
- US Open: Q2 (1998, 1999)

Doubles
- Career record: 61–79
- Career titles: 1 ITF
- Highest ranking: No. 114 (23 July 2001)

Grand Slam doubles results
- Australian Open: 1R (2002)
- Wimbledon: Q2 (1998, 2001)
Medal record
Women's tennis
Asian Games
| Bronze medal – third place | 1998 Bangkok | Women's team |

Haruka Inoue (井上 青香, Inoue Haruka; born 7 June 1977) is a former professional tennis player from Japan.

== Biography ==
=== Early life ===
Born in Tokyo, Inoue, a right-handed baseline player, started tennis aged nine and was coached by her father Gou. Her younger sisters, Maiko and Akari, also played on the professional tennis circuit.

She had her best year as a junior in 1995 when she was a girls' singles quarter-finalist at the Australian Open and semi-finalist at the Wimbledon Championships.

=== Professional career ===
In 1996 she graduated from high school and began competing on the professional tour.

Her earliest success on the WTA Tour came at the Wismilak International in Surabaya, where he made the quarter-finals in both 1996 and 1997.

She qualified for her first Grand Slam tournament at the 1997 Wimbledon Championships and was beaten by seventh seed Anke Huber in the first round.

In the 1998 season, she reached her highest ranking of 108 in the world. Her highlights in 1998 include reaching the quarterfinals of the ENKA Open in Istanbul as well as main draw appearances in three of the four Grand Slam tournaments. At Wimbledon she was one of only three players to take a set off Nathalie Tauziat on the Frenchwoman's run to the final.

She never represented Japan in Fed Cup but was a member of the bronze medal winning women's team at the 1998 Asian Games.

== ITF finals ==
$50,000 tournaments
$25,000 tournaments
$10,000 tournaments

=== Singles (2–4) ===
| Result | No. | Date | Tournament | Surface | Opponent | Score |
|---|---|---|---|---|---|---|
| Loss | 1. | 2 October 1995 | Ibaraki, Japan | Hard | (Japan) Tomoe Hotta | 3–6, 3–6 |
| Loss | 2. | 25 February 1996 | Redbridge, United Kingdom | Hard (i) | (Bulgaria) Elena Pampoulova | 4–6, 4–6 |
| Loss | 3. | 26 October 1997 | Houston, United States | Hard | (South Korea) Park Sung-hee | 1–6, 6–7^{(2)} |
| Loss | 4. | 22 May 1998 | Noda, Japan | Hard | (Japan) Shinobu Asagoe | 2–6, 4–6 |
| Win | 1. | 27 October 2002 | Tokyo, Japan | Hard | (Japan) Aiko Nakamura | 6–2, 6–2 |
| Win | 2. | 19 September 2004 | Kyoto, Japan | Carpet | (Japan) Maika Ozaki | 6–4, 6–1 |

=== Doubles (1–4) ===
| Result | No. | Date | Tournament | Surface | Partner | Opponents | Score |
|---|---|---|---|---|---|---|---|
| Loss | 1. | 3 October 1994 | Ibaraki, Japan | Hard | (Japan) Shinobu Asagoe | (South Korea) Kim Il-soon (Japan) Yoriko Yamagishi | 2–6, 1–6 |
| Loss | 2. | 12 December 1999 | Manila, Philippines | Hard | (Japan) Maiko Inoue | (China) Li Ting (China) Li Na | 3–6, 2–6 |
| Loss | 3. | 26 March 2000 | Stone Mountain, United States | Hard | (Japan) Maiko Inoue | (Australia) Trudi Musgrave (Australia) Bryanne Stewart | 4–6, 6–2, 6–7 |
| Loss | 4. | 20 October 2002 | Haibara, Japan | Carpet | (Japan) Maiko Inoue | (Japan) Remi Tezuka (Japan) Yuka Yoshida | 0–6, 2–6 |
| Win | 1. | 27 October 2002 | Tokyo, Japan | Hard | (Japan) Maiko Inoue | (Japan) Keiko Taguchi (Japan) Nami Urabe | 6–1, 6–2 |
