= 1998 Wimbledon Championships – Boys' singles =

Boys' singles
- 1998 Wimbledon Championships

Final
- Champion: (Switzerland) Roger Federer
- Runner-up: (Georgia (country)) Irakli Labadze
- Score: 6–4, 6–4

Details
- Draw: 64 (8 Q )
- Seeds: 16

Events
| Singles | men | women | | boys | girls |
| Doubles | men | women | mixed | boys | girls |
| WC Singles | men | women | quad |
| WC Doubles | men | women | quad |
| Legends | men | women | seniors |
| ← 1997 · | Wimbledon Championships | · 1999 → |

Roger Federer defeated Irakli Labadze in the final, 6–4, 6–4 to win the boys' singles tennis title at the 1998 Wimbledon Championships. Federer would go on to win a record eight senior Wimbledon titles between 2003 and 2017.

Wesley Whitehouse was the reigning champion, but turned 18 years old during the season and, therefore, was ineligible to compete in juniors.

== Seeds ==
1. (France) Julien Jeanpierre (quarterfinals)
2. (Chile) Fernando González (first round)
3. (Chinese Taipei) Cheng Wei-jen (third round)
4. (Czech Republic) Robin Vik (second round)
5. (Switzerland) Roger Federer (champion)
6. (Brazil) Flávio Saretta (quarterfinals)
7. (Georgia (country)) Irakli Labadze (final)
8. (Brazil) Ricardo Mello (first round)
9. (Belgium) Olivier Rochus (first round)
10. (Venezuela) José de Armas (quarterfinals)
11. (United States) Taylor Dent (second round)
12. (Pakistan) Aisam-ul-Haq Qureshi (third round)
13. (Sweden) Jacob Adaktusson (first round)
14. (Ivory Coast) Valentin Sanon (second round)
15. (Argentina) Edgardo Massa (second round)
16. (Hungary) Balázs Veress (first round)

Click on the seed number of a player to go to their draw section.

== Draw ==
=== Key ===
- Q = Qualifier
- WC = Wild card
- LL = Lucky loser
- Alt = Alternate
- SE = Special exempt
- PR = Protected ranking
- ITF = ITF entry
- JE = Junior exempt
- w/o = Walkover
- r = Retired
- d = Defaulted
- SR = Special ranking

=== Finals ===
Quarterfinals
1 | (France) Julien Jeanpierre | 6 | 3
(Croatia) Lovro Zovko | 7 | 6
(United Kingdom) David Sherwood | 6 | 2
5 | (Switzerland) Roger Federer | 7 | 6
7 | (Georgia (country)) Irakli Labadze | 1 | 7 | 6
10 | (Venezuela) José de Armas | 6 | 6 | 3
6 | (Brazil) Flávio Saretta | 5 | 2
(Russia) Kirill Ivanov-Smolensky | 7 | 6

Semifinals
(Croatia) Lovro Zovko | 5 | 2
5 | (Switzerland) Roger Federer | 7 | 6
7 | (Georgia (country)) Irakli Labadze | 3 | 7 | 6
(Russia) Kirill Ivanov-Smolensky | 6 | 6 | 3

Final
5 | (Switzerland) Roger Federer | 6 | 6
7 | (Georgia (country)) Irakli Labadze | 4 | 4

=== Top half ===
==== Section 1 ====
First round
1 | (France) Julien Jeanpierre | 6 | 4 | 6
(Mexico) Jorge Haro | 2 | 6 | 3
Q | (Germany) Sebastien Aickele | 2 | 3
(Poland) Filip Aniola | 6 | 6
(Austria) Markus Polessnig | 1 | 4
(Greece) Vasilis Mazarakis | 6 | 6
Q | (North Macedonia) Lazar Magdinčev | 2 | 2
11 | (United States) Taylor Dent | 6 | 6
13 | (Sweden) Jacob Adaktusson | 7 | 4 | 3
(Croatia) Lovro Zovko | 6 | 6 | 6
Q | (United Kingdom) Tom Higgins | 1 | 5
(United Kingdom) Richard Brooks | 6 | 7
(Denmark) Bob Borella | 6 | 6
(India) Vijay Kannan | 1 | 4
Q | (United States) Andrew Park | 7 | 1 | 6
8 | (Brazil) Ricardo Mello | 5 | 6 | 1

Second round
1 | (France) J Jeanpierre | 6 | 6
(Poland) F Aniola | 3 | 4
(Greece) V Mazarakis | 6 | 3 | 6
11 | (United States) T Dent | 4 | 6 | 0
(Croatia) L Zovko | 6 | 6
(United Kingdom) R Brooks | 4 | 4
(Denmark) B Borella | 7 | 5 | 5
Q | (United States) A Park | 6 | 7 | 7

Third round
1 | (France) J Jeanpierre | 6 | 6
(Greece) V Mazarakis | 3 | 4
(Croatia) L Zovko | 6 | 6
Q | (United States) A Park | 0 | 4

Quarterfinals
1 | (France) J Jeanpierre | 6 | 3
(Croatia) L Zovko | 7 | 6

==== Section 2 ====
First round
3 | (Chinese Taipei) Cheng Wei-jen | 6 | 6 | 7
(Czech Republic) Ladislav Chramosta | 7 | 4 | 5
LL | (Kazakhstan) Alexey Kedryuk | 7 | 4 | 9
(Austria) Jürgen Melzer | 6 | 6 | 7
(Germany) Philipp Hammer | 4 | 6 | 5
(United Kingdom) David Sherwood | 6 | 3 | 7
LL | (Egypt) Marwan Zewar | 6 | 4
15 | (Argentina) Edgardo Massa | 7 | 6
14 | (Ivory Coast) Valentin Sanon | 6 | 6 | 7
Q | (United Kingdom) Dan Kiernan | 7 | 1 | 5
(United States) Simone Amorico | 6 | 3 | 4
(France) Jérôme Haehnel | 3 | 6 | 6
(Russia) Mikhail Youzhny | 1 | 6
(Slovenia) Andrej Kračman | 6 | 7
(Austria) Philipp Langer | 0 | 2
5 | (Switzerland) Roger Federer | 6 | 6

Second round
3 | (Chinese Taipei) W-j Cheng | 3 | 6 | 6
LL | (Kazakhstan) A Kedryuk | 6 | 2 | 0
(United Kingdom) D Sherwood | 6 | 6
15 | (Argentina) E Massa | 4 | 3
14 | (Ivory Coast) V Sanon | 0 | 0
(France) J Haehnel | 6 | 6
(Slovenia) A Kračman | 6 | 3
5 | (Switzerland) R Federer | 7 | 6

Third round
3 | (Chinese Taipei) W-j Cheng | 5 | 2
(United Kingdom) D Sherwood | 7 | 6
(France) J Haehnel | 4 | 4
5 | (Switzerland) R Federer | 6 | 6

Quarterfinals
(United Kingdom) D Sherwood | 6 | 2
5 | (Switzerland) R Federer | 7 | 6

=== Bottom half ===
==== Section 3 ====
First round
7 | (Georgia (country)) Irakli Labadze | 6 | 6
Q | (Austria) Luben Pampoulov | 3 | 2
(Brazil) Eduardo Bergmann | 6 | 7
(South Africa) Andrew McDade | 4 | 6
(United Kingdom) Simon Dickson | 6 | 6
(United States) KJ Hippensteel | 0 | 3
(Belarus) Maxim Belski | 1 | 4
12 | (Pakistan) Aisam-ul-Haq Qureshi | 6 | 6
10 | (Venezuela) José de Armas | 6 | 6
(Argentina) Emiliano Redondi | 0 | 4
(Austria) Philipp Müllner | 6 | 6
(Thailand) Danai Udomchoke | 2 | 4
(France) Michaël Llodra | 2 | 6
(Israel) Andy Ram | 6 | 7
Q | (United States) Phillip King | 4 | 1
4 | (Czech Republic) Robin Vik | 6 | 6

Second round
7 | (Georgia (country)) I Labadze | 6 | 7
(Brazil) E Bergmann | 1 | 5
(United Kingdom) S Dickson | 2 | 3
12 | (Pakistan) A Qureshi | 6 | 6
10 | (Venezuela) J de Armas | 6 | 7
(Austria) P Müllner | 3 | 6
(Israel) A Ram | 4 | 6 | 8
4 | (Czech Republic) R Vik | 6 | 1 | 6

Third round
7 | (Georgia (country)) I Labadze | 6 | 7 | 6
12 | (Pakistan) A Qureshi | 7 | 6 | 4
10 | (Venezuela) J de Armas | 6 | 6
(Israel) A Ram | 2 | 3

Quarterfinals
7 | (Georgia (country)) I Labadze | 1 | 7 | 6
10 | (Venezuela) J de Armas | 6 | 6 | 3

==== Section 4 ====
First round
6 | (Brazil) Flávio Saretta | 6 | 6
(Slovakia) František Babej | 0 | 2
(United Kingdom) Mark Hilton | 1 | 2
(United States) David Martin | 6 | 6
(Austria) Andreas Fasching | 1 | 2
(Denmark) Kristian Pless | 6 | 6
(Argentina) Ignacio González King | 6 | 6
16 | (Hungary) Balázs Veress | 3 | 3
9 | (Belgium) Olivier Rochus | 5 | 4
Q | (South Africa) Nicholas McDonald | 7 | 6
(Czech Republic) Jakub Hašek | 7 | 6 | 6
(Australia) Nathan Healey | 6 | 7 | 2
(Russia) Kirill Ivanov-Smolensky | 3 | 6 | 6
(United Kingdom) Lee Childs | 6 | 3 | 4
(Croatia) Davor Grgić | 4 | 7 | 6
2 | (Chile) Fernando González | 6 | 6 | 2

Second round
6 | (Brazil) F Saretta | 6 | 6
(United States) D Martin | 4 | 3
(Denmark) K Pless | 4 | 6 | 6
(Argentina) I González King | 6 | 3 | 4
Q | (South Africa) N McDonald | 7 | 5 | 6
(Czech Republic) J Hašek | 5 | 7 | 8
(Russia) K Ivanov-Smolensky | 6 | 6
(Croatia) D Grgić | 3 | 2

Third round
6 | (Brazil) F Saretta | 6 | 6
(Denmark) K Pless | 4 | 3
(Czech Republic) J Hašek | 1 | 3
(Russia) K Ivanov-Smolensky | 6 | 6

Quarterfinals
6 | (Brazil) F Saretta | 5 | 2
(Russia) K Ivanov-Smolensky | 7 | 6
