= 1998 Wimbledon Championships – Boys' doubles =

Part of 1998 Wimbledon Championship

Boys' doubles
- 1998 Wimbledon Championships

Final
- Champions: (Switzerland) Roger Federer (Belgium) Olivier Rochus
- Runners-up: (France) Michaël Llodra (Israel) Andy Ram
- Score: 6–4, 6–4

Events
Singles	men	women		boys	girls
Doubles	men	women	mixed	boys	girls
WC Singles	men	women	quad
WC Doubles	men	women	quad
Legends	men	women	seniors
← 1997 ·	Wimbledon Championships	· 1999 →

Luis Horna and Nicolás Massú were the defending champions, but both players turned 18 years old during the season and, therefore, were not eligible to compete in Juniors.

Roger Federer and Olivier Rochus defeated Michaël Llodra and Andy Ram in the final, 6–4, 6–4 to win the boys' doubles tennis title at the 1998 Wimbledon Championships. It was the 2nd doubles title for Federer and the 3rd doubles title for Rochus in their respective Juniors careers. It was also the 2nd title for the pair in the circuit, after their win in the LTA International Junior Championships at the same year.

== Seeds ==
1. n/a
2. (France) Jérôme Haehnel / (France) Julien Jeanpierre (first round)
3. (United Kingdom) Simon Dickson / (United Kingdom) David Sherwood (first round)
4. (France) Michaël Llodra / (Israel) Andy Ram (final)

== Draw ==
=== Key ===
- Q = Qualifier
- WC = Wild card
- LL = Lucky loser
- Alt = Alternate
- SE = Special exempt
- PR = Protected ranking
- ITF = ITF entry
- JE = Junior exempt
- w/o = Walkover
- r = Retired
- d = Defaulted
- SR = Special ranking

=== Draw ===
First round
(Georgia (country)) Irakli Labadze (Ivory Coast) Valentin Sanon	6	6	5
(Austria) Philipp Langer (Austria) Philipp Mulner	0	7	7
(United States) K. J. Hippensteel (United States) David Martin	6	6
(United Kingdom) Mark Hilton (United Kingdom) Matthew Trudgeon	3	0
3	(United Kingdom) Simon Dickson (United Kingdom) David Sherwood	4	1
(Switzerland) Roger Federer (Belgium) Olivier Rochus	6	6
(Denmark) Bob Borella (Denmark) Kristian Pless	4	2
(Argentina) Ignacio González King (Argentina) Edgardo Massa	6	6
(Australia) Nathan Healey (Slovenia) Andrej Kračman	6	6
(Czech Republic) Ladislav Chramosta (Czech Republic) Robin Vik	2	3
(South Africa) Nicholas McDonald (Croatia) Lovro Zovko	3	2
4	(France) Michaël Llodra (Israel) Andy Ram	6	6
(United States) Simone Amorico (United States) Andrew Park	6	3	7
(Pakistan) Aisam-ul-Haq Qureshi (Egypt) Marwan Zewar	4	6	9
(Slovakia) František Babej (Russia) Kirill Ivanov-Smolensky	7	4	8
2	(France) Jérôme Haehnel (France) Julien Jeanpierre	5	6	6

Quarterfinals
(Austria) Philipp Langer (Austria) Philipp Mulner	5	1
(United States) K. J. Hippensteel (United States) David Martin	7	6
(Switzerland) Roger Federer (Belgium) Olivier Rochus	2	6	6
(Argentina) Ignacio González King (Argentina) Edgardo Massa	6	4	2
(Australia) Nathan Healey (Slovenia) Andrej Kračman	5	6	1
4	(France) Michaël Llodra (Israel) Andy Ram	7	2	6
(Pakistan) Aisam-ul-Haq Qureshi (Egypt) Marwan Zewar	6	6
(Slovakia) František Babej (Russia) Kirill Ivanov-Smolensky	7	7

Semifinals
(United States) K. J. Hippensteel (United States) David Martin	3	3
(Switzerland) Roger Federer (Belgium) Olivier Rochus	6	6
4	(France) Michaël Llodra (Israel) Andy Ram	6	6
(Slovakia) František Babej (Russia) Kirill Ivanov-Smolensky	3	4

Final
(Switzerland) Roger Federer (Belgium) Olivier Rochus	6	6
4	(France) Michaël Llodra (Israel) Andy Ram	4	4
