= Kirill Ivanov-Smolensky =

Russian tennis player

- Country (sports): Russia
- Born: 19 January 1981 (age 45) Moscow, Soviet Union
- Turned pro: 1998
- Plays: Right-handed
- Prize money: $98,959

Singles
- Career record: 0–5
- Career titles: 0
- Highest ranking: No. 278 (17 Jan 2005)

Doubles
- Career record: 2–6
- Career titles: 0
- Highest ranking: No. 224 (24 Jun 2002)

Kirill Ivanov-Smolensky (born 19 February 1981) is a former professional tennis player from Russia.

== Career ==
Ivanov-Smolensky was a boys' singles semi-finalist in the 1998 Wimbledon Championships. He also made the semi-finals in the boys' doubles, with Slovakian Frantisek Babej, which matched his efforts from Wimbledon the previous year, when he partnered Adrian Barnes to the semi-finals. During his junior career he played a doubles tournament with Roger Federer, held at the Bollettieri Sports Academy in 1997.

In 1998, Ivanov-Smolensky represented Russia in their Davis Cup World Group win over Japan in Osaka. He played one match, a dead rubber against Takao Suzuki, which he lost in straight sets.

On the ATP Tour, he appeared in the main singles draw of four tournaments, the 1998 St. Petersburg Open, 1999 Heineken Trophy, 2002 President's Cup and 2002 Ordina Open. At each of those events he was beaten in the opening round, by four different Germans. He did, however, make two doubles quarter-finals: at Tashkent in 1998 (with Dmitri Tomashevich), and Chennai in 2000 (with Orlin Stanoytchev).
