= 1998 Wimbledon Championships – Girls' doubles =

Girls' doubles
- 1998 Wimbledon Championships

Final
- Champions: (Denmark) Eva Dyrberg (Croatia) Jelena Kostanić
- Runners-up: (Slovenia) Petra Rampre (Uzbekistan) Iroda Tulyaganova
- Score: 6–2, 7–6^{(7–5)}

Events
Singles	men	women		boys	girls
Doubles	men	women	mixed	boys	girls
WC Singles	men	women	quad
WC Doubles	men	women	quad
Legends	men	women	seniors
← 1997 ·	Wimbledon Championships	· 1999 →

Cara Black and Irina Selyutina were the defending champions, but both players turned 18 years old during the season and, therefore, were not eligible to compete in Juniors.

Eva Dyrberg and Jelena Kostanić defeated Petra Rampre and Iroda Tulyaganova in the final, 6–2, 7–6^{(7–5)} to win the girls' doubles tennis title at the 1998 Wimbledon Championships. It was the 1st Grand Slam title for both players in their respective Junior doubles careers. Dyrberg would also win the US Open at the same year, teaming up with Kim Clijsters.

== Seeds ==
1. (New Zealand) Leanne Baker / (New Zealand) Rewa Hudson (first round)
2. (Greece) Eleni Daniilidou / (Slovenia) Tina Pisnik (quarterfinals, withdrew)
3. (Belgium) Kim Clijsters / (Australia) Jelena Dokic (first round)
4. (France) Kildine Chevalier / (Hungary) Zsófia Gubacsi (first round)

== Draw ==
=== Key ===
- Q = Qualifier
- WC = Wild card
- LL = Lucky loser
- Alt = Alternate
- SE = Special exempt
- PR = Protected ranking
- ITF = ITF entry
- JE = Junior exempt
- w/o = Walkover
- r = Retired
- d = Defaulted
- SR = Special ranking

=== Draw ===
First round
1	(New Zealand) Leanne Baker (New Zealand) Rewa Hudson	6	6	5
(Denmark) Eva Dyrberg (Croatia) Jelena Kostanić	4	7	7
(Argentina) Erica Krauth (Indonesia) Wynne Prakusya	6	7
WC	(United Kingdom) Hannah Collin (United Kingdom) Katherine Vymetal	4	5
4	(France) Kildine Chevalier (Hungary) Zsófia Gubacsi	6	5	2
(Slovenia) Tina Hergold (Slovakia) Gabriela Voleková	2	7	6
(Australia) Evie Dominikovic (Australia) Alicia Molik	6	6
(United States) Ansley Cargill (Venezuela) Milagros Sequera	4	1
(United States) Lauren Kalvaria (United States) Alexandra Stevenson	5	4
(Slovenia) Petra Rampre (Uzbekistan) Iroda Tulyaganova	7	6
(Slovakia) Stanislava Hrozenská (Croatia) Dora Krstulović	6	6
3	(Belgium) Kim Clijsters (Australia) Jelena Dokic	4	3
(Slovenia) Maja Matevžič (Croatia) Ivana Višić	5	2
(Slovakia) Katarína Bašternáková (Slovakia) Daniela Hantuchová	7	6
(Slovenia) Nives Ćulum (Croatia) Danira Penić	3	5
2	(Greece) Eleni Daniilidou (Slovenia) Tina Pisnik	6	7

Quarterfinals
(Denmark) Eva Dyrberg (Croatia) Jelena Kostanić	6	1	6
(Argentina) Erica Krauth (Indonesia) Wynne Prakusya	1	6	4
(Slovenia) Tina Hergold (Slovakia) Gabriela Voleková	3	6	6
(Australia) Evie Dominikovic (Australia) Alicia Molik	6	3	4
(Slovenia) Petra Rampre (Uzbekistan) Iroda Tulyaganova	6	6
(Slovakia) Stanislava Hrozenská (Croatia) Dora Krstulović	2	4
(Slovakia) Katarína Bašternáková (Slovakia) Daniela Hantuchová
2	(Greece) Eleni Daniilidou (Slovenia) Tina Pisnik	w/o

Semifinals
(Denmark) Eva Dyrberg (Croatia) Jelena Kostanić	6	6
(Slovenia) Tina Hergold (Slovakia) Gabriela Voleková	4	1
(Slovenia) Petra Rampre (Uzbekistan) Iroda Tulyaganova	6	7
(Slovakia) Katarína Bašternáková (Slovakia) Daniela Hantuchová	4	6

Final
(Denmark) Eva Dyrberg (Croatia) Jelena Kostanić	6	7^{7}
(Slovenia) Petra Rampre (Uzbekistan) Iroda Tulyaganova	2	6^{5}
