= Abigail Tordoff =

British tennis player

- Country (sports): United Kingdom
- Born: 18 July 1979 (age 45)
- Plays: Right-handed
- Prize money: $49,569

Singles
- Highest ranking: No. 242 (17 August 1998)

Grand Slam singles results
- Wimbledon: 1R (1999)

Doubles
- Highest ranking: No. 305 (21 June 1999)

Abigail Tordoff (born 18 July 1979) is a British former professional tennis player.

== Biography ==
A former top 50 junior, Tordoff reached a best singles ranking of 242 on the professional tour, playing mostly on the ITF circuit. She also featured in several WTA Tour qualifying draws and at Pattaya in 1997 made it into the main draw of the doubles, with Yi Jing-qian. At the 1999 Wimbledon Championships she appeared in the singles main draw as a wildcard and was beaten in the first round by Elena Wagner. She retired from tennis in 2000.

Tordoff, who previously worked as a sports agent, is the CEO of tennis charity Give It Your Max, which holds in-school tennis programmes.

== ITF finals ==
$25,000 tournaments
$10,000 tournaments

=== Singles (1–3) ===
Outcome	No.	Date	Tournament	Surface	Opponent	Score
Runner-up	1.	2 October 1995	Nottingham, United Kingdom	Hard (i)	(United Kingdom) Samantha Smith	4–6, 2–6
Winner	1.	8 February 1998	Istanbul, Turkey	Carpet (i)	(Hungary) Adrienn Hegedűs	6–3, 6–3
Runner-up	2.	7 June 1998	Antalya, Turkey	Hard	(United States) Sandra De Silva	4–6, 3–6
Runner-up	3.	9 August 1998	Lexington, United States	Hard	(United Kingdom) Julie Pullin	4–6, 4–6

=== Doubles (1–1) ===
Outcome	No.	Date	Tournament	Surface	Partner	Opponents	Score
Runner-up	1.	9 February 1998	Faro, Portugal	Hard	(Portugal) Sofia Prazeres	(Czech Republic) Nikola Hübnerová (Slovakia) Alena Paulenková	2–6, 2–6
Winner	1.	25 September 2000	Glasgow, United Kingdom	Hard (i)	(United Kingdom) Anna Hawkins	(United Kingdom) Julia Smith (Japan) Remi Tezuka	6–2, 6–2
