= 1998 Wimbledon Championships – Girls' singles =

Girls' singles
- 1998 Wimbledon Championships

Final
- Champion: (Slovenia) Katarina Srebotnik
- Runner-up: (Belgium) Kim Clijsters
- Score: 7–6^{(7–3)}, 6–3

Details
- Draw: 64 (8 Q )
- Seeds: 16

Events
Singles	men	women		boys	girls
Doubles	men	women	mixed	boys	girls
WC Singles	men	women	quad
WC Doubles	men	women	quad
Legends	men	women	seniors
← 1997 ·	Wimbledon Championships	· 1999 →

Cara Black was the defending champion, but turned 18 years old during the season and, therefore, was ineligible to compete in Juniors.

Katarina Srebotnik defeated Kim Clijsters in the final, 7–6^{(7–3)}, 6–3 to win the girls' singles tennis title at the 1998 Wimbledon Championships. It was her 1st and only Grand Slam title in Juniors.

== Seeds ==
1. (Australia) Evie Dominikovic (quarterfinals)
2. (Australia) Jelena Dokic (semifinals)
3. (United States) Alexandra Stevenson (third round)
4. (Slovenia) Tina Pisnik (quarterfinals)
5. (Slovenia) Petra Rampre (second round)
6. (Indonesia) Wynne Prakusya (quarterfinals)
7. (Slovenia) Katarina Srebotnik (champion)
8. (Croatia) Jelena Kostanić (first round)
9. (Argentina) Erica Krauth (third round)
10. (Slovenia) Tina Hergold (semifinals)
11. (Venezuela) Milagros Sequera (quarterfinals)
12. (Slovakia) Gabriela Voleková (first round)
13. (France) Kildine Chevalier (first round)
14. (Hungary) Zsófia Gubacsi (third round)
15. (Slovakia) Daniela Hantuchová (second round)
16. (France) Aurélie Védy (first round)

Click on the seed number of a player to go to their draw section.

== Draw ==
=== Key ===
- Q = Qualifier
- WC = Wild card
- LL = Lucky loser
- Alt = Alternate
- SE = Special exempt
- PR = Protected ranking
- ITF = ITF entry
- JE = Junior exempt
- w/o = Walkover
- r = Retired
- d = Defaulted
- SR = Special ranking

=== Finals ===
Quarterfinals
1	(Australia) Evie Dominikovic	4	6
7	(Slovenia) Katarina Srebotnik	6	7
10	(Slovenia) Tina Hergold	6	6
6	(Indonesia) Wynne Prakusya	1	2
(Belgium) Kim Clijsters	6	3
4	(Slovenia) Tina Pisnik	3	0^{r}
11	(Venezuela) Milagros Sequera	3	3
2	(Australia) Jelena Dokic	6	6

Semifinals
7	(Slovenia) Katarina Srebotnik	6	6
10	(Slovenia) Tina Hergold	3	3
(Belgium) Kim Clijsters	6	6	6
2	(Australia) Jelena Dokic	3	7	4

Final
7	(Slovenia) Katarina Srebotnik	7^{7}	6
(Belgium) Kim Clijsters	6^{3}	3

=== Top half ===
==== Section 1 ====
First round
1	(Australia) Evie Dominikovic	7	6
(Japan) Rika Fujiwara	5	2
Q	(China) Li Na	6	6
(New Zealand) Rewa Hudson	3	1
(United Kingdom) Louise Herbert	0	2
Q	(Slovenia) Maja Matevžič	6	6
(Denmark) Eva Dyrberg	6	6
12	(Slovakia) Gabriela Voleková	1	1
14	(Hungary) Zsófia Gubacsi	7	6
(United Kingdom) Lucy Wood	6	1
LL	(Uzbekistan) Iroda Tulyaganova	6	6
(United States) Lauren Kalvaria	3	2
(Croatia) Dora Krstulović	4	6	6
Q	(United States) Lindsay Dawaf	6	3	4
(Switzerland) Caecilia Charbonnier	3	2
7	(Slovenia) Katarina Srebotnik	6	6

Second round
1	(Australia) E Dominikovic	6	6
Q	(China) N Li	3	3
Q	(Slovenia) M Matevžič	6	6
(Denmark) E Dyrberg	4	1
14	(Hungary) Z Gubacsi	6	3	6
LL	(Uzbekistan) I Tulyaganova	4	6	1
(Croatia) D Krstulović	0	4
7	(Slovenia) K Srebotnik	6	6

Third round
1	(Australia) E Dominikovic	6	6
Q	(Slovenia) M Matevžič	4	2
14	(Hungary) Z Gubacsi	4	2
7	(Slovenia) K Srebotnik	6	6

Quarterfinals
1	(Australia) E Dominikovic	4	6
7	(Slovenia) K Srebotnik	6	7

==== Section 2 ====
First round
3	(United States) Alexandra Stevenson	7	6
(Germany) Mia Buric	5	0
(United Kingdom) Heidi Farr	3	2
Q	(South Africa) Aniela Mojzis	6	6
(Belarus) Nadejda Ostrovskaya	4	6	4
(Slovakia) Stanislava Hrozenská	6	3	6
(Czech Republic) Veronika Raimrová	3	7	2
10	(Slovenia) Tina Hergold	6	6	6
16	(France) Aurélie Védy	6	6	5
(Croatia) Danira Penić	4	7	7
LL	(South Africa) Nicole Rencken	1	2
(Australia) Alicia Molik	6	6
(Colombia) Mariana Mesa	4	6	2
(United Kingdom) Claire Seal	6	3	6
(United States) Laura Granville	2	3
6	(Indonesia) Wynne Prakusya	6	6

Second round
3	(United States) A Stevenson	6	6
Q	(South Africa) A Mojzis	1	4
(Slovakia) S Hrozenská	4	6	5
10	(Slovenia) T Hergold	6	2	7
(Croatia) D Penić	6	6
(Australia) A Molik	4	4
(United Kingdom) C Seal	1	1
6	(Indonesia) W Prakusya	6	6

Third round
3	(United States) A Stevenson	6	3	4
10	(Slovenia) T Hergold	2	6	6
(Croatia) D Penić	6	6	0
6	(Indonesia) W Prakusya	7	3	6

Quarterfinals
10	(Slovenia) T Hergold	6	6
6	(Indonesia) W Prakusya	1	2

=== Bottom half ===
==== Section 3 ====
First round
8	(Croatia) Jelena Kostanić	3	4
(Czech Republic) Dája Bedáňová	6	6
(Slovenia) Nives Ćulum	6	4	3
(United States) Whitney Laiho	4	6	6
(Austria) Sybille Bammer	2	1
(United Kingdom) Hannah Collin	6	6
(Belgium) Kim Clijsters	7	6
13	(France) Kildine Chevalier	6	4
15	(Slovakia) Daniela Hantuchová	7	6
Q	(United Kingdom) Katherine Vymetal	5	3
(Mexico) Dominique Reynolds	1	1
(New Zealand) Leanne Baker	6	6
(United States) Ansley Cargill	6	6
(United Kingdom) Claire Carter	4	2
(Greece) Eleni Daniilidou	6	3	8
4	(Slovenia) Tina Pisnik	4	6	10

Second round
(Czech Republic) D Bedáňová	3	7	6
(United States) W Laiho	6	5	2
(United Kingdom) H Collin	1	2
(Belgium) K Clijsters	6	6
15	(Slovakia) D Hantuchová	6	6
(New Zealand) L Baker	7	7
(United States) A Cargill	6	3
4	(Slovenia) T Pisnik	7	6

Third round
(Czech Republic) D Bedáňová	5	1
(Belgium) K Clijsters	7	6
(New Zealand) L Baker	4	5
4	(Slovenia) T Pisnik	6	7

Quarterfinals
(Belgium) K Clijsters	6	3
4	(Slovenia) T Pisnik	3	0^{r}

==== Section 4 ====
First round
5	(Slovenia) Petra Rampre	7	6
(France) Virginie Razzano	5	2
(Belarus) Alessia Nikolaeva	4	6	6
(Croatia) Ivana Višić	6	1	2
(United States) Jackie Trail	6	7
(Slovakia) Katarína Bašternáková	1	6
(Canada) Kavitha Krishnamurthy	6	5	1
11	(Venezuela) Milagros Sequera	3	7	6
9	(Argentina) Erica Krauth	6	3	6
(United Kingdom) Laura Cartwright	1	6	4
Q	(Ukraine) Tatiana Perebiynis	6	6
Q	(Germany) Julia Schruff	3	4
LL	(United States) Kate Granson	6	6
Q	(Czech Republic) Petra Novotniková	4	1
(South Africa) Natalie Grandin	7	4	2
2	(Australia) Jelena Dokic	5	6	6

Second round
5	(Slovenia) P Rampre	4	2
(Belarus) A Nikolaeva	6	6
(United States) J Trail	3	6	4
11	(Venezuela) M Sequera	6	4	6
9	(Argentina) E Krauth	6	3	6
Q	(Ukraine) T Perebiynis	2	6	2
LL	(United States) K Granson	6	1	1
2	(Australia) J Dokic	2	6	6

Third round
(Belarus) A Nikolaeva	5	2
11	(Venezuela) M Sequera	7	6
9	(Argentina) E Krauth	4	4
2	(Australia) J Dokic	6	6

Quarterfinals
11	(Venezuela) M Sequera	3	3
2	(Australia) J Dokic	6	6
