= Nick Gould =

British tennis player

- Country (sports): United Kingdom
- Born: 9 July 1972 (age 53) Avon, England
- Plays: Right-handed
- Prize money: $78,554

Singles
- Career record: 1–4
- Career titles: 0
- Highest ranking: No. 259 (4 March 1996)

Grand Slam singles results
- Wimbledon: 1R (1994, 1996)

Doubles
- Career record: 0–2
- Career titles: 0
- Highest ranking: No. 318 (11 May 1998)

Grand Slam doubles results
- Wimbledon: 1R (1998)

Nick Gould (born 9 July 1972) is a former British tennis player.

== Career ==
Gould twice competed in the main draw at the Wimbledon Championships, in 1994 and 1996. Although he was unable to progress past the first round in either, he did manage to take world number 26 Jaime Yzaga to five sets in the 1994 Wimbledon Championships. He earned a call up to the British squad in the 1996 Davis Cup competition, for a tie against Slovenia in Newcastle-upon-Tyne. With the side weakened by the withdrawal of Tim Henman due to illness, Gould got an opportunity in the fifth match, which was a dead rubber. He defeated his opponent Borut Urh in three sets.

== See also ==
- List of Great Britain Davis Cup team representatives
