= Nick Weal =

British tennis player

- Full name: Nick Weal
- Country (sports): Great Britain
- Born: 4 September 1973 (age 51); Surrey, England
- Plays: Right-handed
- Prize money: $41,659

Singles
- Career record: 0–1
- Highest ranking: No. 291 (7 April 1997)

Grand Slam singles results
- Wimbledon: 1R (1997)

Doubles
- Career record: 0–4
- Highest ranking: No. 321 (18 August 1997)

Grand Slam doubles results
- Wimbledon: 1R (1997, 1998)

Nick Weal (born 4 September 1973) is a British former professional tennis player.

== Biography ==
Weal, who was born in Surrey and educated at Yateley School, played professionally in the 1990s.

A right-handed player, he was runner-up to Ben Ellwood at the Bristol Challenger in 1996 and competed as a wildcard at the 1997 Wimbledon Championships, losing to Christophe Van Garsse in the first round.

In doubles he appeared twice in the main draw at Wimbledon, as a wildcard pairing with Barry Cowan in 1997 and partnering Ross Matheson as qualifiers in 1998. He featured twice in the main doubles draw of the Bournemouth International ATP Tour tournament.

Now working as a coach with the LTA, Weal coached the Great Britain team which won the 2015 Davis Cup.
