= Toby Mitchell =

Australian tennis player

- Full name: Toby Mitchell
- Country (sports): Australia
- Born: 1 March 1976 (age 49); Leongatha, Victoria, Australia
- Plays: Right-handed
- Prize money: $53,242

Singles
- Career record: 0–2
- Highest ranking: No. 248 (14 December 1998)

Grand Slam singles results
- Australian Open: 1R (1997, 1999)

Doubles
- Career record: 0–2
- Highest ranking: No. 208 (9 June 1997)

Grand Slam doubles results
- Australian Open: 1R (1997, 1999)

Toby Mitchell (born 20 August 1976) is an Australian former professional tennis player.

== Biography ==
Mitchell was born in the Victorian town of Leongatha but later moved to Queensland where he was based.

A right-handed player, he featured in the main draw of two Australian Open tournaments. As a qualifier he lost to Àlex Corretja in the first round of the 1997 Australian Open and then at the 1999 Australian Open he featured as a wildcard, losing to Byron Black in the opening round.

He retired from professional tennis in 2000.
