= Julien Jeanpierre =

French tennis player

- Country (sports): France
- Residence: Boulogne-Billancourt, France
- Born: 10 March 1980 (age 45); Remiremont, France
- Height: 1.88 m (6 ft 2 in)
- Turned pro: 1999
- Plays: Right-handed
- Prize money: $225,543

Singles
- Career record: 3–2
- Career titles: 0
- Highest ranking: No. 133 (23 August 2004)

Grand Slam singles results
- Australian Open: Q1 (2005, 2007)
- French Open: 3R (2004)
- US Open: Q1 (2004, 2007)

Doubles
- Career record: 1–2
- Career titles: 0
- Highest ranking: No. 171 (9 October 2006)

Grand Slam doubles results
- French Open: 2R (2004)
- Last updated on: 22 September 2021.

Julien Jeanpierre (French: [ʒyljɛ̃ ʒɑ̃pjɛʁ]; born 10 March 1980) is a former professional tennis player from France.

== Junior career ==
Jeanpierre was a world number one ranked junior and had wins over Roger Federer, Lleyton Hewitt and David Nalbandian during his junior years.

In 1996, he was the U16 Orange Bowl champion.

He and Arnaud Di Pasquale were doubles runners-up in the 1997 French Open.

The Frenchman won both the boys' singles and doubles titles at the 1998 Australian Open. In the singles he defeated Sweden's Andreas Vinciguerra in the final and in the doubles he partnered Jérôme Haehnel.

== Junior Grand Slam finals ==
=== Singles: 1 (1 title) ===
Result	Year	Tournament	Surface	Opponent	Score
Win	1998	Australian Open	Hard	(Sweden) Andreas Vinciguerra	4–6, 6–4, 6–3

=== Doubles: 2 (1 title, 1 runner-up) ===
Result	Year	Tournament	Surface	Partnet	Opponents	Score
Loss	1997	French Open	Clay	(France) Arnaud Di Pasquale	(Venezuela) Jose De Armas (Peru) Luis Horna	4–6, 6–2, 5–7
Win	1998	Australian Open	Hard	(France) Jerome Haehnel	(Croatia) Mirko Pehar (Croatia) Lovro Zovko	6–3, 6–3

== ATP Tour ==
Jeanpierre appeared in his first men's Grand Slam event at the 1998 French Open. He only competed in the doubles, with Di Pasquale. The pair were defeated in the opening round by Danny Sapsford and Chris Wilkinson.

He reached the third round of the 2004 French Open, as a qualifier, winning both of his matches in straight sets, over Slovakian Karol Beck and 27th seed Vincent Spadea. Countryman Michaël Llodra then ended his run. Jeanpierre also took part in the doubles with Édouard Roger-Vasselin and they made it into the second round, defeating Julien Boutter and Antony Dupuis.

== Performance timelines ==
Key
W	F	SF	QF	#R	RR	Q#	DNQ	A	NH

(W) winner; (F) finalist; (SF) semifinalist; (QF) quarterfinalist; (#R) rounds 4, 3, 2, 1; (RR) round-robin stage; (Q#) qualification round; (DNQ) did not qualify; (A) absent; (NH) not held; (SR) strike rate (events won / competed); (W–L) win–loss record.

=== Singles ===
Tournament	2003	2004	2005	2006	2007	2008	SR	W–L	Win%
Grand Slam tournaments
Australian Open	A	A	Q1	A	Q1	A	0 / 0	0–0	–
French Open	Q1	3R	A	A	Q1	Q1	0 / 1	2–1	67%
Wimbledon	A	A	A	A	A	A	0 / 0	0–0	–
US Open	A	Q1	A	A	Q1	A	0 / 0	0–0	–
Win–loss	0–0	2–1	0–0	0–0	0–0	0–0	0 / 1	2–1	67%
ATP Tour Masters 1000
Indian Wells	A	A	Q2	A	A	A	0 / 0	0–0	–
Canada Masters	A	Q2	A	A	A	A	0 / 0	0–0	–
Cincinnati	A	Q1	A	A	A	A	0 / 0	0–-0	–
Win–loss	0–0	0–0	0–0	0–0	0–0	0–0	0 / 0	0–0	–

== ATP Challenger and ITF Futures finals ==
=== Singles: 12 (8–4) ===
Legend ATP Challenger (3–0) ITF Futures (5–4)	Finals by surface Hard (3–2) Clay (5–2) Grass (0–0) Carpet (0–0)

Result	W–L	Date	Tournament	Tier	Surface	Opponent	Score
Win	1–0	Jul 2002	Egypt F1, Dokki	Futures	Clay	(Egypt) Karim Maamoun	6–2, 6–3
Loss	1–1	Aug 2002	Egypt F2, Giza	Futures	Clay	(United Kingdom) Miles MacLagan	2–6, 4–6
Win	2–1	Aug 2002	Egypt F3, Maadi	Futures	Clay	(Federal Republic of Yugoslavia) Vladimir Pavićević	6–3, 6–0
Win	3–1	Jun 2003	Germany F5, Friesenheim	Futures	Clay	(France) Jerome Haehnel	5–7, 6–4, 7–5
Win	4–1	Jun 2003	France F11, Toulon	Futures	Clay	(France) Olivier Patience	7–5, 5–7, 6–1
Loss	4–2	Feb 2004	France F2, Feucherolles	Futures	Hard	(France) Marc Gicquel	6–3, 2–6, 6–7^{(4–7)}
Win	5–2	Feb 2004	Cherbourg, France	Challenger	Hard	(Croatia) Roko Karanusic	6–1, 6–2
Win	6–2	Aug 2004	Bronx, United States	Challenger	Hard	(Netherlands) Peter Wessels	7–6^{(7–4)}, 3–6, 6–3
Loss	6–3	Oct 2006	France F18, La Roche Sur Yon	Futures	Hard	(Czech Republic) Lukas Rosol	5–7, 3–6
Win	7–3	Nov 2006	Kawana, Australia	Challenger	Hard	(Chinese Taipei) Yen-Hsun Lu	6–3, 1–6, 6–4
Loss	7–4	Jul 2008	France F12, Saint Gervais	Futures	Clay	(France) Jonathan Dasnieres De Veigy	6–7^{(5–7)}, 7–5, 3–6
Win	8–4	Feb 2009	France F1, Bagnoles-de-l'Orne	Futures	Clay	(Belgium) Yannick Mertens	6–1, 3–6, 6–3

=== Doubles: 26 (10–16) ===
Legend ATP Challenger (0–4) ITF Futures (10–12)	Finals by surface Hard (2–4) Clay (8–12) Grass (0–0) Carpet (0–0)

Result	W–L	Date	Tournament	Tier	Surface	Partner	Opponents	Score
Win	1–0	Jul 1999	Spain F3, Dénia	Futures	Clay	(Spain) Óscar Hernández	(Australia) Tim Crichton (Australia) Todd Perry	6–2, 7–6
Loss	1–1	Aug 1999	Spain F7, Irun	Futures	Clay	(Spain) Carlos Martinez-Comet	(Argentina) Andres Schneiter (Argentina) Marcello Wowk	6–7, 5–7
Loss	1–2	Jun 2001	Italy F6, Verona	Futures	Clay	(Italy) Stefano Cobolli	(Italy) Diego Alvarez (Italy) Nahuel Fracassi	1–4 ret.
Loss	1–3	Aug 2002	Egypt F2, Giza	Futures	Clay	(France) Sylvain Charrier	(Slovakia) Tomas Janci (Slovakia) Michal Varsanyi	4–6, 3–6
Loss	1–4	Jul 2003	Olbia, Italy	Challenger	Clay	(Luxembourg) Mike Scheidweiler	(Italy) Vincenzo Santopadre (Italy) Alessio Di Mauro	6–2, 4–6, 2–6
Loss	1–5	Jan 2004	United Arab Emirates F1, Dubai	Futures	Hard	(France) Edouard Roger-Vasselin	(Germany) Ivo Klec (Czech Republic) Jaroslav Levinsky	4–6, 5–7
Loss	1–6	Aug 2005	Spain F20, Irun	Futures	Clay	(France) Augustin Gensse	(Spain) Marc Fornell-Mestres (Spain) Daniel Monedero-Gonzalez	4–6, 4–6
Win	2–6	Oct 2005	France F16, Nevers	Futures	Hard	(France) Jean-Michel Pequery	(United Kingdom) David Sherwood (United Kingdom) Kyle Spencer	6–4, 6–7^{(7–9)}, 7–5
Win	3–6	Oct 2005	France F18, La Roche Sur Yon	Futures	Hard	(France) Nicolas Renavand	(Serbia and Montenegro) Darko Madjarovski (Serbia and Montenegro) Petar Popovic	0–6, 6–3, 6–4
Loss	3–7	Jan 2006	France F1, Deauville	Futures	Clay	(France) Nicolas Renavand	(Italy) Marco Crugnola (Italy) Alessandro Da Col	6–7^{(5–7)}, 6–4, 5–7
Loss	3–8	Feb 2006	France F2, Feucherolles	Futures	Hard	(France) Nicolas Renavand	(United Kingdom) David Corrie (Germany) Sebastian Fitz	4–6, 7–5, 4–6
Loss	3–9	May 2006	Zagreb, Croatia	Challenger	Clay	(France) Nicolas Renavand	(Switzerland) Yves Allegro (Slovakia) Michal Mertinak	1–6, 2–6
Win	4–9	Jun 2006	France F8, Blois	Futures	Clay	(France) David Guez	(Poland) Tomasz Bednarek (Poland) Filip Urban	6–7^{(3–7)}, 6–1, 7–6^{(7–5)}
Loss	4–10	Jul 2006	France F9, Toulon	Futures	Clay	(France) David Guez	(Spain) Carlos Poch-Gradin (Spain) Carles Reixach Itoiz	3–6, 4–6
Loss	4–11	Jul 2006	Belgium F1, Waterloo	Futures	Clay	(France) Jordane Doble	(United States) Nikita Kryvonos (Czech Republic) Lukas Rosol	2–6, 3–6
Loss	4–12	Aug 2006	San Marino, San Marino	Challenger	Clay	(France) Jerome Haehnel	(Argentina) Sergio Roitman (Argentina) Máximo González	3–6, 4–6
Win	5–12	Jan 2008	Spain F1, Menorca	Futures	Clay	(France) Xavier Pujo	(Greece) Alexandros Jakupovic (Spain) Carlos Poch-Gradin	3–6, 6–4, [10–5]
Win	6–12	Jan 2008	Spain F2, Mallorca	Futures	Clay	(France) Xavier Pujo	(Bulgaria) Grigor Dimitrov (Spain) Juan Albert Viloca	7–5, 6–2
Loss	6–13	Mar 2008	France F5, Poitiers	Futures	Hard	(France) Josselin Ouanna	(Belgium) Ruben Bemelmans (Belgium) Stefan Wauters	5–7, 4–6
Win	7–13	Jun 2008	France F8, Blois	Futures	Clay	(France) Xavier Pujo	(France) Olivier Charroin (France) Mathieu Rodrigues	6–4, 6–2
Win	8–13	Jul 2008	France F10, Montauban	Futures	Clay	(France) Jean-Baptiste Perlant	(France) Marc Auradou (France) Jonathan Eysseric	7–6^{(7–2)}, 6–1
Loss	8–14	Aug 2008	Graz, Austria	Challenger	Clay	(France) Nicolas Renavand	(Austria) Gerald Melzer (Austria) Jürgen Melzer	6–1, 6–7^{(8–10)}, [4–10]
Win	9–14	Apr 2009	France F7, Grasse	Futures	Clay	(France) Jean-Christophe Faurel	(France) Mathieu Monleau (France) Christophe Squarta	6–4, 6–2
Win	10–14	Jun 2009	France F8, Blois	Futures	Clay	(France) Nicolas Renavand	(France) Jeremy Blandin (France) Pierrick Ysern	6–4, 6–4
Loss	10–15	Jun 2009	France F9, Toulon	Futures	Clay	(France) Nicolas Renavand	(France) Augustin Gensse (Portugal) Leonardo Tavares	2–6, 2–6
Loss	10–16	Sep 2009	France F15, Plaisir	Futures	Hard	(France) Nicolas Renavand	(France) Olivier Charroin (France) Alexandre Renard	1–6, 6–4, [8–10]
