= Tina Hergold =

Slovenian tennis player

- Country (sports): Slovenia
- Born: 18 October 1981 (age 43); SR Slovenia, SFR Yugoslavia
- Prize money: $68,849

Singles
- Career record: 99–76
- Career titles: 3 ITF
- Highest ranking: 157 (4 December 2000)

Grand Slam singles results
- Australian Open: Q1 (2001)
- Wimbledon: Q1 (2000)
- US Open: Q3 (2000)

Doubles
- Career record: 80–46
- Career titles: 9 ITF
- Highest ranking: 143 (20 November 2000)

Grand Slam doubles results
- Australian Open: 1R (2001)

Team competitions
- Fed Cup: 2–2

Tina Hergold (born 18 October 1981) is a Slovenian retired tennis player.

In her career, she won three singles titles and nine doubles titles on the ITF Circuit. On 4 December 2000, she reached her best singles ranking of world No. 157. On 20 November 2000, she peaked at No. 143 in the doubles rankings.

Playing for Slovenia at the Fed Cup, Hergold has a win–loss record of 2–2.

== ITF Circuit finals ==
=== Singles: 6 (3 titles, 3 runner-ups) ===
| Legend $100,000 tournaments $75,000 tournaments $50,000 tournaments $25,000 tournaments $10,000 tournaments | Finals by surface Hard (0–1) Clay (3–2) Grass (0–0) Carpet (0–0) |

| Result | No. | Date | Tournament | Surface | Opponent | Score |
|---|---|---|---|---|---|---|
| Win | 1. | 18 July 1999 | ITF Puchheim, Germany | Clay | (Czech Republic) Adriana Gerši | 3–6, 7–6^{(7–4)}, 6–3 |
| Loss | 1. | 22 October 2000 | ITF Largo, United States | Hard | (United States) Brie Rippner | 2–6, 1–6 |
| Win | 2. | 10 March 2002 | ITF Makarska, Croatia | Clay | (Sweden) Maria Wolfbrandt | 3–6, 6–3, 7–5 |
| Loss | 2. | 31 March 2002 | ITF Filothei, Greece | Clay | (Czech Republic) Petra Cetkovská | 3–6, 2–6 |
| Win | 3. | 14 April 2002 | ITF Makarska, Croatia | Clay | (Croatia) Ivana Lisjak | 6–4, 6–2 |
| Loss | 3. | 13 October 2002 | ITF Makarska, Croatia | Clay | (Croatia) Ivana Lisjak | 6–7^{(5–7)}, 7–5, 3–6 |

=== Doubles: 14 (9 titles, 5 runner-ups) ===
| Legend $100,000 tournaments $75,000 tournaments $50,000 tournaments $25,000 tournaments $10,000 tournaments | Finals by surface Hard (0–0) Clay (9–4) Grass (0–0) Carpet (0–1) |

| Result | No. | Date | Tournament | Surface | Partner | Opponents | Score |
|---|---|---|---|---|---|---|---|
| Win | 1. | 15 June 1997 | ITF Velenje, Slovenia | Clay | (Slovenia) Tina Pisnik | (Czech Republic) Helena Fremuthová (Canada) Aneta Soukup | w/o |
| Win | 2. | 24 August 1997 | ITF Maribor, Slovenia | Clay | (Slovenia) Tina Pisnik | (Slovenia) Nives Ćulum (Slovenia) Tina Hojnik | 6–3, 6–2 |
| Loss | 1. | 24 July 1999 | ITF Dublin, Ireland | Carpet | (United Kingdom) Hannah Collin | (South Africa) Surina de Beer (Israel) Tzipora Obziler | 5–7, 6–4, 2–6 |
| Loss | 2. | 3 June 2000 | ITF Modena, Italy | Clay | (Slovenia) Maja Matevžič | (Spain) Lourdes Domínguez Lino (Spain) María José Martínez Sánchez | 4–6, 6–4, 3–6 |
| Loss | 3. | 9 February 2002 | ITF Lecce, Italy | Clay (i) | (Czech Republic) Eva Erbová | (Ukraine) Yuliya Beygelzimer (Hungary) Eszter Molnár | 6–7^{(3–7)}, 4–6 |
| Win | 3. | 9 March 2002 | ITF Makarska, Croatia | Clay | (Israel) Yevgenia Savransky | (Croatia) Ivana Abramović (Czech Republic) Lenka Tvarošková | 5–7, 6–3, 7–5 |
| Win | 4. | 17 March 2002 | ITF Makarska, Croatia | Clay | (Israel) Yevgenia Savransky | (Italy) Silvia Disderi (Czech Republic) Zuzana Hejdová | 6–3, 7–5 |
| Win | 5. | 13 April 2002 | ITF Makarska, Croatia | Clay | (Czech Republic) Petra Cetkovská | (Switzerland) Daniela Casanova (Croatia) Marijana Kovačević | 7–5, 6–2 |
| Loss | 4. | 12 May 2002 | ITF Zaton, Croatia | Clay | (Croatia) Sanda Mamić | (Austria) Daniela Klemenschits (Austria) Sandra Klemenschits | 4–6, 4–6 |
| Win | 6. | 2 June 2002 | ITF Mostar, Bosnia and Herzegovina | Clay | (Serbia and Montenegro) Sandra Naćuk | (Serbia and Montenegro) Katarina Mišić (Hungary) Katalin Marosi | 6–3, 6–3 |
| Win | 7. | 23 June 2002 | ITF Gorizia, Italy | Clay | (Serbia and Montenegro) Sandra Naćuk | (Spain) Arantxa Parra Santonja (Brazil) Carla Tiene | 6–4, 6–3 |
| Win | 8. | 28 July 2002 | ITF Český Krumlov, Czech Republic | Clay | (Hungary) Katalin Marosi | (Czech Republic) Gabriela Navrátilová (Czech Republic) Milena Nekvapilová | 7–6^{(7–2)}, 7–5 |
| Win | 9. | 25 August 2002 | ITF Maribor, Slovenia | Clay | (Hungary) Eszter Molnár | (Ukraine) Alona Bondarenko (Russia) Olga Kalyuzhnaya | 6–1, 6–1 |
| Loss | 5. | 11 November 2002 | ITF Mexico City, Mexico | Clay | (Canada) Vanessa Webb | (Czech Republic) Olga Blahotová (Czech Republic) Gabriela Navrátilová | 6–3, 3–6, 4–6 |
