= Andrew Park (tennis) =

American tennis player

- Country (sports): United States
- Born: January 2, 1980 (age 45); San Marino, California
- Plays: Right-handed

Singles

Grand Slam singles results
- US Open: 1R (1998)

Andrew Park (born January 2, 1980) is a former professional tennis player from the United States.

== Career ==
As a junior, Park and partner Travis Parrott made the doubles semi-finals at the 1997 Orange Bowl and the boys' doubles quarter-finals at the 1998 Australian Open. He won the USTA National Closed Championships in 1998.

Park, who played collegiate tennis at the University of Southern California, was given a wildcard into the 1998 US Open main draw. He lost in the opening round to Mikael Tillström, in straight sets.
