= 1998 Wimbledon Championships – Men's doubles =

Men's doubles
- 1998 Wimbledon Championships

Final
- Champions: (Netherlands) Jacco Eltingh (Netherlands) Paul Haarhuis
- Runners-up: (Australia) Todd Woodbridge (Australia) Mark Woodforde
- Score: 2–6, 6–4, 7–6^{(7–3)}, 5–7, 10–8

Details
- Draw: 64 (3 Q / 5 WC )
- Seeds: 16

Events
Singles	men	women		boys	girls
Doubles	men	women	mixed	boys	girls
WC Singles	men	women	quad
WC Doubles	men	women	quad
Legends	men	women	seniors
← 1997 ·	Wimbledon Championships	· 1999 →

Jacco Eltingh and Paul Haarhuis defeated the five-time defending champions Todd Woodbridge and Mark Woodforde in a rematch of the previous year's final, 2–6, 6–4, 7–6^{(7–3)}, 5–7, 10–8, to win the gentlemen's doubles title at the 1998 Wimbledon Championships.

== Seeds ==
1. (Netherlands) Jacco Eltingh / (Netherlands) Paul Haarhuis (champions)
2. (Australia) Todd Woodbridge / (Australia) Mark Woodforde (final)
3. (India) Mahesh Bhupathi / (India) Leander Paes (second round)
4. (South Africa) Ellis Ferreira / (United States) Rick Leach (quarterfinals)
5. (Sweden) Jonas Björkman / (Australia) Patrick Rafter (semifinals)
6. (United States) Donald Johnson / (United States) Francisco Montana (third round)
7. (Russia) Yevgeny Kafelnikov / (Czech Republic) Daniel Vacek (third round)
8. (Czech Republic) Martin Damm / (United States) Jim Grabb (third round)
9. (United States) Patrick Galbraith / (New Zealand) Brett Steven (quarterfinals)
10. (Sweden) Nicklas Kulti / (Australia) David Macpherson (quarterfinals)
11. (The Bahamas) Mark Knowles / (Canada) Daniel Nestor (third round)
12. (Zimbabwe) Wayne Black / (Canada) Sébastien Lareau (semifinals)
13. (Australia) Joshua Eagle / (Australia) Andrew Florent (first round)
14. (United Kingdom) Neil Broad / (South Africa) Piet Norval (third round)
15. (Germany) Marc-Kevin Goellner / (Germany) David Prinosil (second round)
16. (Australia) Sandon Stolle / (Czech Republic) Cyril Suk (third round)

Click on the seed number of a player to go to their draw section.

== Draw ==
=== Key ===
- Q = Qualifier
- WC = Wild card
- LL = Lucky loser
- Alt = Alternate
- ITF = ITF entry
- PR = Protected ranking
- SR = Special ranking
- SE = Special exempt
- JE = Junior exempt
- JR = Junior Accelerator Programme entrant
- CO = College Accelerator Programme entrant
- NG = Next Gen Accelerator Program entrant
- w/o = Walkover
- r = Retired
- d = Defaulted

=== Finals ===
Quarterfinals
1	(Netherlands) Jacco Eltingh (Netherlands) Paul Haarhuis	6	5	7^{7}	6
10	(Sweden) Nicklas Kulti (Australia) David Macpherson	4	7	6^{2}	2
(United States) Justin Gimelstob (United States) Brian MacPhie	4	4	6^{4}
12	(Zimbabwe) Wayne Black (Canada) Sébastien Lareau	6	6	7^{7}
5	(Sweden) Jonas Björkman (Australia) Patrick Rafter	5	5	6	6	11
4	(South Africa) Ellis Ferreira (United States) Rick Leach	7	7	3	4	9
9	(United States) Patrick Galbraith (New Zealand) Brett Steven	0	7	4	6	3
2	(Australia) Todd Woodbridge (Australia) Mark Woodforde	6	5	6	4	6

Semifinals
1	(Netherlands) Jacco Eltingh (Netherlands) Paul Haarhuis	6	6	7
12	(Zimbabwe) Wayne Black (Canada) Sébastien Lareau	4	4	5
5	(Sweden) Jonas Björkman (Australia) Patrick Rafter	4	6	2	5
2	(Australia) Todd Woodbridge (Australia) Mark Woodforde	6	1	6	7

Final
1	(Netherlands) Jacco Eltingh (Netherlands) Paul Haarhuis	2	6	7^{7}	5	10
2	(Australia) Todd Woodbridge (Australia) Mark Woodforde	6	4	6^{3}	7	8

=== Top half ===
==== Section 1 ====
First round
1	(Netherlands) J Eltingh (Netherlands) P Haarhuis	6	7
(France) J-P Fleurian (United States) J Waite	4	5
(United States) K Kinnear (United States) D Randall	6^{13}	4
(Netherlands) J Siemerink (Netherlands) F Wibier	7^{15}	6
(United States) L Jensen (United States) M Jensen	1	3
(United States) D Flach (United States) G Van Emburgh	6	6
(Australia) P Kilderry (Sweden) P Nyborg	3	6^{5}
16	(Australia) S Stolle (Czech Republic) C Suk	6	7^{7}
10	(Sweden) N Kulti (Australia) D Macpherson	4	7^{7}	6
(Belgium) L Pimek (Czech Republic) T Zdražila	6	6^{2}	1
(South Africa) D Adams (Czech Republic) C Doseděl	4	6	3
(North Macedonia) A Kitinov (Czech Republic) P Vízner	6	3	6
(United States) B Coupe (United States) D DiLucia	6	6
(Italy) M Ardinghi (Italy) M Bertolini	4	2
WC	(United Kingdom) N Gould (United Kingdom) M Petchey	3	0
7	(Russia) Y Kafelnikov (Czech Republic) D Vacek	6	6

Second round
1	(Netherlands) J Eltingh (Netherlands) P Haarhuis	6	6
(Netherlands) J Siemerink (Netherlands) F Wibier	4	2
(United States) D Flach (United States) G Van Emburgh	6	6^{3}	6
16	(Australia) S Stolle (Czech Republic) C Suk	2	7^{7}	8
10	(Sweden) N Kulti (Australia) D Macpherson	7^{10}	6
(North Macedonia) A Kitinov (Czech Republic) P Vízner	6^{8}	1
(United States) B Coupe (United States) D DiLucia	1	4
7	(Russia) Y Kafelnikov (Czech Republic) D Vacek	6	6

Third round
1	(Netherlands) J Eltingh (Netherlands) P Haarhuis	6	6
16	(Australia) S Stolle (Czech Republic) C Suk	4	4
10	(Sweden) N Kulti (Australia) D Macpherson	7^{7}	6
7	(Russia) Y Kafelnikov (Czech Republic) D Vacek	6^{3}	3

Quarterfinals
1	(Netherlands) J Eltingh (Netherlands) P Haarhuis	6	5	7^{7}	6
10	(Sweden) N Kulti (Australia) D Macpherson	4	7	6^{2}	2

==== Section 2 ====
First round
3	(India) M Bhupathi (India) L Paes	6	6
(Belarus) M Mirnyi (Russia) A Olhovskiy	4	3
(Zimbabwe) B Black (United States) R Reneberg	1	4
(United States) J Gimelstob (United States) B MacPhie	6	6
(United States) D Bowen (South Africa) B Talbot	3	7^{10}	4
(Germany) K Braasch (Germany) J Knippschild	6	6^{8}	6
(Mexico) D Roditi (Armenia) S Sargsian	7^{7}	6^{5}	5
14	(United Kingdom) N Broad (South Africa) P Norval	6^{3}	7^{7}	7
12	(Zimbabwe) W Black (Canada) S Lareau	6	6
Q	(United Kingdom) R Matheson (United Kingdom) N Weal	2	4
WC	(United Kingdom) L Milligan (United Kingdom) A Parmar	1	7	8
(Argentina) D Orsanic (Venezuela) M Ruah	6	5	6
(Hungary) G Köves (United States) J Tarango	6	6
(Netherlands) T Kempers (Netherlands) M Oosting	3	4
(United Kingdom) D Sapsford (United Kingdom) C Wilkinson	7^{7}	2	3
6	(United States) D Johnson (United States) F Montana	6^{5}	6	6

Second round
3	(India) M Bhupathi (India) L Paes	6	6^{4}	4
(United States) J Gimelstob (United States) B MacPhie	4	7^{7}	6
(Germany) K Braasch (Germany) J Knippschild	3	6	7
14	(United Kingdom) N Broad (South Africa) P Norval	6	4	9
12	(Zimbabwe) W Black (Canada) S Lareau	6	6
WC	(United Kingdom) L Milligan (United Kingdom) A Parmar	2	3
(Hungary) G Köves (United States) J Tarango	2	5
6	(United States) D Johnson (United States) F Montana	6	7

Third round
(United States) J Gimelstob (United States) B MacPhie	6	7^{11}
14	(United Kingdom) N Broad (South Africa) P Norval	3	6^{9}
12	(Zimbabwe) W Black (Canada) S Lareau	6	7^{11}
6	(United States) D Johnson (United States) F Montana	3	6^{9}

Quarterfinals
(United States) J Gimelstob (United States) B MacPhie	4	4	6^{4}
12	(Zimbabwe) W Black (Canada) S Lareau	6	6	7^{7}

=== Bottom half ===
==== Section 3 ====
First round
5	(Sweden) J Björkman (Australia) P Rafter	6	6
(Czech Republic) J Novák (Czech Republic) D Rikl	3	2
(South Africa) G Stafford (South Africa) K Ullyett	7^{10}	4	9
(Netherlands) T Nijssen (Netherlands) S Noteboom	6^{8}	6	7
(Federal Republic of Yugoslavia) N Đorđević (Netherlands) S Groen	7	6^{2}	6
(Australia) W Arthurs (Australia) A Kratzmann	5	7^{7}	8
(United States) M Keil (United States) TJ Middleton	6^{7}	2
11	(The Bahamas) M Knowles (Canada) D Nestor	7^{9}	6
13	(Australia) J Eagle (Australia) A Florent	4	6^{5}
(South Africa) N Godwin (Finland) T Ketola	6	7^{7}
WC	(United Kingdom) J Delgado (United Kingdom) A Foster	3	4
(South Africa) C Haggard (South Africa) P Rosner	6	6
(Argentina) M Hood (Argentina) S Prieto	6^{4}	4
(Argentina) P Albano (Ecuador) N Lapentti	7^{7}	6
WC	(United Kingdom) M Maclagan (United Kingdom) A Richardson	3	1
4	(South Africa) E Ferreira (United States) R Leach	6	6

Second round
5	(Sweden) J Björkman (Australia) P Rafter	6	7
(South Africa) G Stafford (South Africa) K Ullyett	3	5
(Australia) W Arthurs (Australia) A Kratzmann	3	3
11	(The Bahamas) M Knowles (Canada) D Nestor	6	6
(South Africa) N Godwin (Finland) T Ketola	3	6^{1}
(South Africa) C Haggard (South Africa) P Rosner	6	7^{7}
(Argentina) P Albano (Ecuador) N Lapentti	7^{12}	3	3
4	(South Africa) E Ferreira (United States) R Leach	6^{10}	6	6

Third round
5	(Sweden) J Björkman (Australia) P Rafter	7	5	6
11	(The Bahamas) M Knowles (Canada) D Nestor	5	7	2
(South Africa) C Haggard (South Africa) P Rosner	6^{4}	0
4	(South Africa) E Ferreira (United States) R Leach	7^{7}	6

Quarterfinals
5	(Sweden) J Björkman (Australia) P Rafter	5	5	6	6	11
4	(South Africa) E Ferreira (United States) R Leach	7	7	3	4	9

==== Section 4 ====
First round
8	(Czech Republic) M Damm (United States) J Grabb	2	6	6
(South Africa) M Barnard (United States) G Grant	6	4	2
Q	(Czech Republic) P Luxa (Czech Republic) D Škoch	5	3
Q	(Australia) J Holmes (Australia) A Painter	7	6
(Italy) C Brandi (Italy) F Messori	6	4	4
(Portugal) N Marques (Belgium) T Vanhoudt	4	6	6
WC	(United Kingdom) B Cowan (United Kingdom) T Spinks	3	6	3
9	(United States) P Galbraith (New Zealand) B Steven	6	3	6
15	(Germany) M-K Goellner (Germany) D Prinosil	6	6
(United States) M Merklein (United States) M Sell	2	2
(Brazil) N Aerts (Brazil) A Sá	3	4
(South Africa) J-L de Jager (South Africa) R Koenig	6	6
(United States) T Martin (United States) A O'Brien	7^{7}	7^{7}
(Australia) M Tebbutt (Australia) P Tramacchi	6^{3}	6^{4}
(Spain) J Burillo (Spain) T Carbonell	1	4
2	(Australia) T Woodbridge (Australia) M Woodforde	6	6

Second round
8	(Czech Republic) M Damm (United States) J Grabb	6	7^{9}
Q	(Australia) J Holmes (Australia) A Painter	4	6^{7}
(Portugal) N Marques (Belgium) T Vanhoudt	3	5
9	(United States) P Galbraith (New Zealand) B Steven	6	7
15	(Germany) M-K Goellner (Germany) D Prinosil	6^{4}	6	3
(South Africa) J-L de Jager (South Africa) R Koenig	7^{7}	4	6
(United States) T Martin (United States) A O'Brien	6^{4}	3
2	(Australia) T Woodbridge (Australia) M Woodforde	7^{7}	6

Third round
8	(Czech Republic) M Damm (United States) J Grabb	6^{5}	2
9	(United States) P Galbraith (New Zealand) B Steven	7^{7}	6
(South Africa) J-L de Jager (South Africa) R Koenig	1	6^{6}
2	(Australia) T Woodbridge (Australia) M Woodforde	6	7^{8}

Quarterfinals
9	(United States) P Galbraith (New Zealand) B Steven	0	7	4	6	3
2	(Australia) T Woodbridge (Australia) M Woodforde	6	5	6	4	6
