= 1998 Wimbledon Championships – Mixed doubles =

Mixed doubles
- 1998 Wimbledon Championships

Final
- Champions: (Belarus) Max Mirnyi (United States) Serena Williams
- Runners-up: (India) Mahesh Bhupathi (Croatia) Mirjana Lučić
- Score: 6–4, 6–4

Details
- Draw: 64 (5WC)
- Seeds: 16

Events
Singles	men	women		boys	girls
Doubles	men	women	mixed	boys	girls
WC Singles	men	women	quad
WC Doubles	men	women	quad
Legends	men	women	seniors
- Wimbledon Championships

Max Mirnyi and Serena Williams defeated Mahesh Bhupathi and Mirjana Lučić in the final, 6–4, 6–4, to win the mixed doubles tennis title at the 1998 Wimbledon Championships.

Cyril Suk and Helena Suková were the defending champions, but lost in the first round to Justin Gimelstob and Venus Williams.

== Seeds ==
1. (India) Leander Paes / (Latvia) Larisa Neiland (quarterfinals)
2. (Netherlands) Paul Haarhuis / (Netherlands) Caroline Vis (semifinals)
3. (United States) Rick Leach / (Netherlands) Manon Bollegraf (first round)
4. (Canada) Daniel Nestor / (France) Nathalie Tauziat (third round)
5. (India) Mahesh Bhupathi / (Croatia) Mirjana Lučić (final)
6. (United States) Patrick Galbraith / (United States) Lisa Raymond (first round)
7. (Czech Republic) Cyril Suk / (Czech Republic) Helena Suková (first round)
8. (South Africa) David Adams / (France) Alexandra Fusai (first round)
9. (Argentina) Daniel Orsanic / (Argentina) Patricia Tarabini (first round)
10. (Australia) David Macpherson / (Australia) Rachel McQuillan (third round)
11. (South Africa) John-Laffnie de Jager / (United States) Katrina Adams (first round)
12. (United Kingdom) Neil Broad / (South Africa) Mariaan de Swardt (first round)
13. (Mexico) David Roditi / (Argentina) Paola Suárez (first round)
14. (Netherlands) Menno Oosting / (Belgium) Sabine Appelmans (first round)
15. (South Africa) Piet Norval / (United States) Corina Morariu (first round)
16. (United States) Brian MacPhie / (United States) Lindsay Davenport (second round)

Click on the seed number of a player to go to their draw section.

== Draw ==
Key

- Q = Qualifier
- WC = Wild card
- LL = Lucky loser
- Alt = Alternate
- ITF = ITF entry
- PR = Protected ranking
- SR = Special ranking
- SE = Special exempt
- JE = Junior exempt
- JR = Junior Accelerator Programme entrant
- CO = College Accelerator Programme entrant
- NG = Next Gen Accelerator Program entrant
- w/o = Walkover
- r = Retired
- d = Defaulted

=== Finals ===
Quarterfinals
1	(India) Leander Paes (Latvia) Larisa Neiland	3	4
(United States) Justin Gimelstob (United States) Venus Williams	6	6
(Australia) Wayne Arthurs (Australia) Kerry-Anne Guse	6^{2}	6	3
5	(India) Mahesh Bhupathi (Croatia) Mirjana Lučić	7^{7}	3	6
(Australia) Sandon Stolle (Australia) Kristine Kunce	5	7	4
(Belarus) Max Mirnyi (United States) Serena Williams	7	5	6
(United States) Jeff Tarango (Russia) Elena Likhovtseva	2	5
2	(Netherlands) Paul Haarhuis (Netherlands) Caroline Vis	6	7

Semifinals
(United States) Justin Gimelstob (United States) Venus Williams	4	5
5	(India) Mahesh Bhupathi (Croatia) Mirjana Lučić	6	7
(Belarus) Max Mirnyi (United States) Serena Williams	4	6	7
2	(Netherlands) Paul Haarhuis (Netherlands) Caroline Vis	6	4	5

Final
5	(India) Mahesh Bhupathi (Croatia) Mirjana Lučić	4	4
(Belarus) Max Mirnyi (United States) Serena Williams	6	6

=== Top half ===
==== Section 1 ====
First round
1	(India) L Paes (Latvia) L Neiland	6	6
(Netherlands) T Kempers (Slovakia) K Habšudová	4	3
(Australia) M Tebbutt (Australia) C Barclay	4	6	3
(Venezuela) M Ruah (Argentina) F Labat	6	3	6
(Argentina) P Albano (Argentina) M Paz	6	7^{7}
WC	(United Kingdom) D Sapsford (United Kingdom) J Pullin	1	6^{2}
(South Africa) N Godwin (Netherlands) S Noorlander	7^{7}	6
13	(Mexico) D Roditi (Argentina) P Suárez	6^{5}	4
15	(South Africa) P Norval (United States) C Morariu	5	6	5
(Russia) A Olhovskiy (Ukraine) O Lugina	7	3	7
(United States) M Keil (Australia) L McShea	6	3	6
(Belgium) L Pimek (Bulgaria) S Krivencheva	3	6	4
(United States) D Bowen (Japan) R Hiraki	7	6
(Netherlands) S Noteboom (Netherlands) M Oremans	5	4
(United States) J Gimelstob (United States) V Williams	6	5	6
7	(Czech Republic) C Suk (Czech Republic) H Suková	3	7	4

Second round
1	(India) L Paes (Latvia) L Neiland	6	6
(Venezuela) M Ruah (Argentina) F Labat	1	4
(Argentina) P Albano (Argentina) M Paz	4	6	4
(South Africa) N Godwin (Netherlands) S Noorlander	6	2	6
(Russia) A Olhovskiy (Ukraine) O Lugina	3	7	8
(United States) M Keil (Australia) L McShea	6	5	6
(United States) D Bowen (Japan) R Hiraki	3	4
(United States) J Gimelstob (United States) V Williams	6	6

Third round
1	(India) L Paes (Latvia) L Neiland	6	6
(South Africa) N Godwin (Netherlands) S Noorlander	3	4
(Russia) A Olhovskiy (Ukraine) O Lugina	3	2
(United States) J Gimelstob (United States) V Williams	6	6

Quarterfinals
1	(India) L Paes (Latvia) L Neiland	3	4
(United States) J Gimelstob (United States) V Williams	6	6

==== Section 2 ====
First round
3	(United States) R Leach (Netherlands) M Bollegraf	6^{4}	4
(Australia) W Arthurs (Australia) K-A Guse	7^{7}	6
(North Macedonia) A Kitinov (Czech Republic) E Melicharová	2	4
(South Africa) K Ullyett (Italy) L Golarsa	6	6
Alt	(Netherlands) T Nijssen (Indonesia) Y Basuki	3	6^{0}
(United States) A O'Brien (Belarus) O Barabanschikova	6	7^{7}
WC	(Zimbabwe) W Black (Zimbabwe) C Black	5	6	6
11	(South Africa) J-L de Jager (United States) K Adams	7	2	4
9	(Argentina) D Orsanic (Argentina) P Tarabini	2	7^{9}	7
(United States) D Johnson (Canada) S Jeyaseelan	6	6^{7}	9
(United States) D Randall (Czech Republic) H Vildová	1	7	0
(Hungary) G Köves (Austria) B Schett	6	5	6
(Germany) K Braasch (Switzerland) P Schnyder	6	3
(United States) L Jensen (United States) D Graham	1	0^{r}
(United States) D DiLucia (South Korea) S-h Park	5	6	3
5	(India) M Bhupathi (Croatia) M Lučić	7	3	6

Second round
(Australia) W Arthurs (Australia) K-A Guse	6	3	6
(South Africa) K Ullyett (Italy) L Golarsa	3	6	3
(United States) A O'Brien (Belarus) O Barabanschikova	2	2
WC	(Zimbabwe) W Black (Zimbabwe) C Black	6	6
(United States) D Johnson (Canada) S Jeyaseelan	6	6
(Hungary) G Köves (Austria) B Schett	4	4
(Germany) K Braasch (Switzerland) P Schnyder	6^{6}	5
5	(India) M Bhupathi (Croatia) M Lučić	7^{8}	7

Third round
(Australia) W Arthurs (Australia) K-A Guse	6	6
WC	(Zimbabwe) W Black (Zimbabwe) C Black	1	4
(United States) D Johnson (Canada) S Jeyaseelan	6^{1}	3
5	(India) M Bhupathi (Croatia) M Lučić	7^{7}	6

Quarterfinals
(Australia) W Arthurs (Australia) K-A Guse	6^{2}	6	3
5	(India) M Bhupathi (Croatia) M Lučić	7^{7}	3	6

=== Bottom half ===
==== Section 3 ====
First round
6	(United States) P Galbraith (United States) L Raymond	0	4
(Australia) S Stolle (Australia) K Kunce	6	6
(United States) TJ Middleton (United States) L McNeil	7^{9}	7^{7}
(United States) K Kinnear (Japan) N Miyagi	6^{7}	6^{4}
(United States) M Sell (Chinese Taipei) J Lee	3	3
(Belgium) T Vanhoudt (Belgium) D Van Roost	6	6
(Australia) J Eagle (United States) E deLone	3	4
10	(Australia) D Macpherson (Australia) R McQuillan	6	6
16	(United States) B MacPhie (United States) L Davenport	7^{7}	6
(United States) D Wheaton (United States) G Helgeson-Nielsen	6^{5}	4
(Belarus) M Mirnyi (United States) S Williams	6	7^{11}
(United States) G Grant (Romania) C Cristea	1	6^{9}
(Australia) A Florent (Australia) L Pleming	6	2	2
(Australia) P Kilderry (Australia) A Ellwood	3	6	6
(Australia) P Tramacchi (Australia) R Stubbs	3	5
4	(Canada) D Nestor (France) N Tauziat	6	7

Second round
(Australia) S Stolle (Australia) K Kunce	7	6
(United States) TJ Middleton (United States) L McNeil	5	3
(Belgium) T Vanhoudt (Belgium) D Van Roost	6^{3}	4
10	(Australia) D Macpherson (Australia) R McQuillan	7^{7}	6
16	(United States) B MacPhie (United States) L Davenport	6	6^{4}	2
(Belarus) M Mirnyi (United States) S Williams	4	7^{7}	6
(Australia) P Kilderry (Australia) A Ellwood	6	5	3
4	(Canada) D Nestor (France) N Tauziat	4	7	6

Third round
(Australia) S Stolle (Australia) K Kunce	6	7^{7}
10	(Australia) D Macpherson (Australia) R McQuillan	3	6^{4}
(Belarus) M Mirnyi (United States) S Williams	5	6	6
4	(Canada) D Nestor (France) N Tauziat	7	3	4

Quarterfinals
(Australia) S Stolle (Australia) K Kunce	5	7	4
(Belarus) M Mirnyi (United States) S Williams	7	5	6

==== Section 4 ====
First round
8	(South Africa) D Adams (France) A Fusai	4	6	3
(South Africa) M Barnard (Netherlands) K Boogert	6	3	6
(South Africa) R Koenig (Australia) N Pratt	3	6	9
(South Africa) C Haggard (South Africa) N de Villiers	6	3	7
(Sweden) P Nyborg (South Africa) L Horn	2	5
(United States) J Tarango (Russia) E Likhovtseva	6	7
(Australia) A Kratzmann (Ukraine) E Tatarkova	6	3	6
12	(United Kingdom) N Broad (South Africa) M de Swardt	2	6	3
14	(Netherlands) M Oosting (Belgium) S Appelmans	3	4
(United States) J Waite (United States) K Po	6	6
(United States) F Montana (Germany) C Schneider	3	4
WC	(United Kingdom) J Delgado (United Kingdom) E Jelfs	6	6
WC	(United Kingdom) C Wilkinson (United Kingdom) L Woodroffe	6	6
WC	(United Kingdom) L Milligan (United Kingdom) J Moore	4	2
(South Africa) B Talbot (Belgium) E Callens	1	7	3
2	(Netherlands) P Haarhuis (Netherlands) C Vis	6	5	6

Second round
(South Africa) M Barnard (Netherlands) K Boogert	5	6	2
(South Africa) R Koenig (Australia) N Pratt	7	4	6
(United States) J Tarango (Russia) E Likhovtseva	6	7^{7}
(Australia) A Kratzmann (Ukraine) E Tatarkova	1	6^{2}
(United States) J Waite (United States) K Po	6	6
WC	(United Kingdom) J Delgado (United Kingdom) E Jelfs	1	2
WC	(United Kingdom) C Wilkinson (United Kingdom) L Woodroffe	4	4
2	(Netherlands) P Haarhuis (Netherlands) C Vis	6	6

Third round
(South Africa) R Koenig (Australia) N Pratt	6^{5}	2
(United States) J Tarango (Russia) E Likhovtseva	7^{7}	6
(United States) J Waite (United States) K Po	2	3
2	(Netherlands) P Haarhuis (Netherlands) C Vis	6	6

Quarterfinals
(United States) J Tarango (Russia) E Likhovtseva	2	5
2	(Netherlands) P Haarhuis (Netherlands) C Vis	6	7
