= Luke Milligan =

British tennis player

- Country (sports): Great Britain
- Born: 6 August 1976 (age 49) Barnet, London
- Height: 5 ft 11 in (180 cm)
- Plays: Right-handed
- Prize money: $150,362

Singles
- Career record: 5–7
- Highest ranking: No. 217 (8 July 1996)

Grand Slam singles results
- Wimbledon: 3R (1996)

Doubles
- Career record: 1–6
- Highest ranking: No. 420 (14 September 1998)

Grand Slam doubles results
- US Open: 2R (1998)

Luke Milligan (born 6 August 1976) is a former tennis player from the United Kingdom, who turned professional in 1995.

A right-hander, Milligan reached his highest individual ranking on the ATP Tour on 8 July 1996, when he became the world number 217 just after he had won through to the third round of the Wimbledon tournament. Also in 1996 he represented Great Britain in the Davis cup in an away tie vs Ghana, winning 2 singles matches.

Turning to coaching in 2003, Luke has coached several top British players including Laura Robson, Arvind Parmar, and Anne Keothavong.
