= Hannah Collin =

English tennis player

- Country (sports): United Kingdom
- Born: 18 February 1982 (age 43); Thames Ditton, Surrey
- Turned pro: 1997
- Retired: 2005
- Prize money: $95,816

Singles
- Career record: 178–137
- Career titles: 3 ITF
- Highest ranking: No. 217 (16 July 2001)

Grand Slam singles results
- Wimbledon: 1R (2000, 2001, 2002)

Doubles
- Career record: 52–69
- Career titles: 2 ITF
- Highest ranking: No. 335 (23 July 2001)

Grand Slam doubles results
- Wimbledon: 1R (2001, 2004)

Team competitions
- Fed Cup: 1–2

Hannah Collin (born 18 February 1982) is an English former professional tennis player.

Collin competed at her home Grand Slam, Wimbledon, on three consecutive occasions from 2000 to 2002 and also for Great Britain in the Europe/Africa Zone at the 2000 edition of the Fed Cup.

Considered to be one of Britain's most promising young players in the 1990s, at a time when British tennis was doing particularly poorly, she reached the quarterfinals of the Wimbledon juniors' tournament, and was the national 14, 16 and 18 year old age group champion.

She played her first match on the ITF Women's Circuit in 1997 and her final professional match at the Wimbledon qualifying event in 2005. During her career, she reached a total of seven ITF singles finals (winning three) and managed to notch up a victory over former British number one, Sam Smith. She also managed to beat Justine Henin and Kim Clijsters.

== ITF Circuit finals ==
$25,000 tournaments
$10,000 tournaments

=== Singles (3–4) ===
Result	No.	Date	Location	Surface	Opponent	Score
Win	1.	10 September 2000	Mollerussa, Spain	Carpet	(China) Shen Luili	6–2, 6–3
Win	2.	18 September 2000	Sunderland, United Kingdom	Hard (i)	(France) Olivia Sanchez	6–3, 6–3
Win	3.	3 December 2000	Arad, Israel	Hard	(Austria) Daniela Klemenschits	5–3, 4–0, 4–0
Loss	4.	20 July 2002	Frinton, United Kingdom	Grass	(Italy) Alberta Brianti	2–6, 4–6
Loss	5.	5 August 2002	Bath, United Kingdom	Hard	(United Kingdom) Anne Keothavong	0–6, 6–7^{(5)}
Loss	6.	23 September 2002	Sunderland, United Kingdom	Hard (i)	(United Kingdom) Anne Keothavong	0–6, 1–6
Loss	7.	17 August 2003	London, United Kingdom	Hard	(Turkey) İpek Şenoğlu	4–6, 4–6

=== Doubles (2–7) ===
Result	No.	Date	Location	Surface	Partner	Opponents	Score
Loss	1.	5 April 1998	Brest, France	Hard	(United Kingdom) Lydia Perkins	(France) Ségolène Berger (France) Sophie Georges	6–3, 0–6, 2–6
Loss	2.	24 July 1999	Dublin, Ireland	Carpet	(Slovenia) Tina Hergold	(South Africa) Surina de Beer (Israel) Tzipora Obziler	5–7, 6–4, 2–6
Loss	3.	24 April 2000	Bournemouth, United Kingdom	Clay	(Hungary) Zsófia Gubacsi	(Tunisia) Selima Sfar (United Kingdom) Lorna Woodroffe	1–6, 0–6
Loss	4.	10 September 2000	Mollerussa, Spain	Carpet	(Netherlands) Jolanda Mens	(Switzerland) Marylene Losey (Switzerland) Lucia Tallo	5–7, 3–6
Loss	5.	30 August 2003	Coimbra, Portugal	Hard	(Portugal) Neuza Silva	(New Zealand) Paula Marama (Israel) Danielle Steinberg	4–6, 6–7
Win	6.	5 July 2004	Felixstowe, United Kingdom	Grass	(United Kingdom) Anna Hawkins	(United Kingdom) Helen Crook (United Kingdom) Karen Paterson	6–4, 6–4
Loss	7.	14 September 2004	Manchester, United Kingdom	Hard (i)	(United Kingdom) Anna Hawkins	(Finland) Emma Laine (Finland) Essi Laine	4–6, 4–6
Loss	8.	19 October 2004	Bolton, United Kingdom	Hard (i)	(United Kingdom) Anna Hawkins	(United Kingdom) Sarah Borwell (United Kingdom) Emily Webley-Smith	5–7, 6–1, 2–6
Win	9.	28 November 2004	San Luis Potosí, Mexico	Hard	(United Kingdom) Karen Paterson	(Croatia) Ivana Abramović (Croatia) Maria Abramović	6–4, 2–6, 6–2

== Performance timelines ==
Key
W	F	SF	QF	#R	RR	Q#	DNQ	A	NH

(W) winner; (F) finalist; (SF) semifinalist; (QF) quarterfinalist; (#R) rounds 4, 3, 2, 1; (RR) round-robin stage; (Q#) qualification round; (DNQ) did not qualify; (A) absent; (NH) not held; (SR) strike rate (events won / competed); (W–L) win–loss record.

=== Singles ===
Tournament	1998	1999	2000	2001	2002	2003	2004	2005	W–L	SR
Australian Open	Absent								0–0	0 / 0
French Open	Absent								0–0	0 / 0
Wimbledon	Q1	Q1	1R	1R	1R	A	A	Q1	0–3	0 / 3
US Open	Absent								0–0	0 / 0
Year-end ranking	531	360	283	278	324	420	528	695		

=== Doubles ===
Tournament	1998	1999	2000	2001	2002	2003	2004	2005	W–L	SR
Australian Open	Absent								0–0	0 / 0
French Open	Absent								0–0	0 / 0
Wimbledon	Q1	Absent		1R	Absent		1R	Q1	0–2	0 / 2
US Open	Absent								0–0	0 / 0
Year-end ranking	402	402	408	386	418	642	443	509		

=== Fed Cup ===
2000 Federation Cup Main Draw
Date	Venue	Surface	Round	Opponent	Final match score	Match	Opponents	Rubber score
18–19 Jul 2000	Murcia	Clay	RR	Israel	1–2	Singles	Tzipi Obziler	6–1, 6–1 (W)
18–19 Jul 2000	Murcia	Clay	RR	Israel	1–2	Doubles (with Julie Pullin)	Obziler/Rosen	6–3, 4–6, 1–6 (L)
18–19 Jul 2000	Murcia	Clay	RR	Luxembourg	1–2	Singles	Claudine Schaul	3–6, 3–6 (L)

== Post-retirement life ==
After retiring, Collin became a tennis coach. She is currently a coach at the All England Club at Wimbledon.
