= 1998 Wimbledon Championships – Women's doubles =

Women's doubles
- 1998 Wimbledon Championships

Final
- Champions: (Switzerland) Martina Hingis (Czech Republic) Jana Novotná
- Runners-up: (United States) Lindsay Davenport (Belarus) Natasha Zvereva
- Score: 6–3, 3–6, 8–6

Details
- Draw: 64 (2 Q / 4 WC )
- Seeds: 16

Events
Singles	men	women		boys	girls
Doubles	men	women	mixed	boys	girls
WC Singles	men	women	quad
WC Doubles	men	women	quad
Legends	men	women	seniors
← 1997 ·	Wimbledon Championships	· 1999 →

Martina Hingis and Jana Novotná defeated the defending champion Natasha Zvereva and her partner Lindsay Davenport in the final, 7–6^{(7–4)}, 6–4 to win the ladies' doubles tennis title at the 1998 Wimbledon Championships. It was the third step in an eventual Grand Slam for Hingis.

Gigi Fernández and Zvereva were the reigning champions, but Fernández retired at the end of the 1997 season.

== Seeds ==
1. (Switzerland) Martina Hingis / (Czech Republic) Jana Novotná (champions)
2. (United States) Lindsay Davenport / (Belarus) Natasha Zvereva (final)
3. (Spain) Arantxa Sánchez Vicario / (Czech Republic) Helena Suková (quarterfinals)
4. (France) Alexandra Fusai / (France) Nathalie Tauziat (second round)
5. (Indonesia) Yayuk Basuki / (Netherlands) Caroline Vis (third round)
6. n/a
7. (United States) Lisa Raymond / (Australia) Rennae Stubbs (semifinals)
8. (United States) Katrina Adams / (Netherlands) Manon Bollegraf (third round)
9. (Spain) Conchita Martínez / (Argentina) Patricia Tarabini (first round)
10. (Russia) Elena Likhovtseva / (Japan) Ai Sugiyama (third round)
11. (Japan) Naoko Kijimuta / (Japan) Nana Miyagi (third round)
12. (Austria) Barbara Schett / (Switzerland) Patty Schnyder (first round)
13. (Belgium) Sabine Appelmans / (Netherlands) Miriam Oremans (first round)
14. (Australia) Catherine Barclay / (Australia) Kerry-Anne Guse (quarterfinals)
15. (Argentina) Florencia Labat / (Belgium) Dominique Van Roost (third round)
16. (Spain) Virginia Ruano Pascual / (Argentina) Paola Suárez (second round)
17. (South Africa) Mariaan de Swardt / (United States) Debbie Graham (semifinals)

Click on the seed number of a player to go to their draw section.

== Draw ==
=== Key ===
- Q = Qualifier
- WC = Wild card
- LL = Lucky loser
- Alt = Alternate
- ITF = ITF entry
- PR = Protected ranking
- SR = Special ranking
- SE = Special exempt
- JE = Junior exempt
- JR = Junior Accelerator Programme entrant
- CO = College Accelerator Programme entrant
- NG = Next Gen Accelerator Program entrant
- w/o = Walkover
- r = Retired
- d = Defaulted

=== Finals ===
Quarterfinals
1	(Switzerland) Martina Hingis (Czech Republic) Jana Novotná	6	6
(Belgium) Els Callens (France) Julie Halard-Decugis	1	4
3	(Spain) Arantxa Sánchez Vicario (Czech Republic) Helena Suková	6	3	1
7	(United States) Lisa Raymond (Australia) Rennae Stubbs	4	6	6
(Italy) Silvia Farina (Argentina) Laura Montalvo	2	6^{5}
17	(South Africa) Mariaan de Swardt (United States) Debbie Graham	6	7^{7}
14	(Australia) Catherine Barclay (Australia) Kerry-Anne Guse	4	2
2	(United States) Lindsay Davenport (Belarus) Natasha Zvereva	6	6

Semifinals
1	(Switzerland) Martina Hingis (Czech Republic) Jana Novotná	6	6
7	(United States) Lisa Raymond (Australia) Rennae Stubbs	2	3
17	(South Africa) Mariaan de Swardt (United States) Debbie Graham	3	0
2	(United States) Lindsay Davenport (Belarus) Natasha Zvereva	6	6

Final
1	(Switzerland) Martina Hingis (Czech Republic) Jana Novotná	6	3	8
2	(United States) Lindsay Davenport (Belarus) Natasha Zvereva	3	6	6

=== Top half ===
==== Section 1 ====
First round
1	(Switzerland) M Hingis (Czech Republic) J Novotná	6	6
(South Africa) S de Beer (United States) L Lee	1	1
(Germany) K Freye (Netherlands) S Noorlander	4	2
(Slovenia) T Križan (Slovenia) K Srebotnik	6	6
LL	(United States) B Rippner (South Africa) J Steck	4	2
(Canada) S Jeyaseelan (Canada) R Simpson	6	6
(United States) S Williams (United States) V Williams	w/o
11	(Japan) N Kijimuta (Japan) N Miyagi
16	(Spain) V Ruano Pascual (Argentina) P Suárez	6	4	6
(France) A-G Sidot (Germany) E Wagner	4	6	4
(Australia) A Ellwood (Australia) N Pratt	4	2
(Belgium) E Callens (France) J Halard-Decugis	6	6
(Czech Republic) R Bobková (Germany) C Schneider	6	7
WC	(United Kingdom) S Smith (United Kingdom) J Ward	2	5
Q	(Zimbabwe) C Black (Kazakhstan) I Selyutina	2	7	5
5	(Indonesia) Y Basuki (Netherlands) C Vis	6	5	7

Second round
1	(Switzerland) M Hingis (Czech Republic) J Novotná	4	6	6
(Slovenia) T Križan (Slovenia) K Srebotnik	6	1	2
(Canada) S Jeyaseelan (Canada) R Simpson	4	3
11	(Japan) N Kijimuta (Japan) N Miyagi	6	6
16	(Spain) V Ruano Pascual (Argentina) P Suárez	3	4
(Belgium) E Callens (France) J Halard-Decugis	6	6
(Czech Republic) R Bobková (Germany) C Schneider	6	3	4
5	(Indonesia) Y Basuki (Netherlands) C Vis	3	6	6

Third round
1	(Switzerland) M Hingis (Czech Republic) J Novotná	6	6
11	(Japan) N Kijimuta (Japan) N Miyagi	3	4
(Belgium) E Callens (France) J Halard-Decugis	4	6	9
5	(Indonesia) Y Basuki (Netherlands) C Vis	6	4	7

Quarterfinals
1	(Switzerland) M Hingis (Czech Republic) J Novotná	6	6
(Belgium) E Callens (France) J Halard-Decugis	1	4

==== Section 2 ====
First round
3	(Spain) A Sánchez Vicario (Czech Republic) H Suková	7^{7}	6
(Romania) C Cristea (Czech Republic) E Melicharová	6^{3}	2
WC	(United Kingdom) K Cross (United Kingdom) L Latimer	5	5
(France) C Dhenin (France) É Loit	7	7
(Germany) C Singer (Czech Republic) H Vildová	4	2
(Germany) K Kschwendt (Ukraine) E Tatarkova	6	6
(United Kingdom) J Pullin (United Kingdom) L Woodroffe	3	2
10	(Russia) E Likhovtseva (Japan) A Sugiyama	6	6
13	(Belgium) S Appelmans (Netherlands) M Oremans	7	1	7
(Italy) R Grande (United States) G Helgeson-Nielsen	5	6	9
(Australia) T Musgrave (Poland) A Olsza	0	6	4
(South Korea) E-h Kim (Japan) M Saeki	6	4	6
WC	(United Kingdom) H Crook (United Kingdom) V Davies	4	4
(South Africa) N de Villiers (Australia) L McShea	6	6
(France) A Dechaume-Balleret (South Africa) L Horn	2	6^{5}
7	(United States) L Raymond (Australia) R Stubbs	6	7^{7}

Second round
3	(Spain) A Sánchez Vicario (Czech Republic) H Suková	7^{7}	7
(France) C Dhenin (France) É Loit	6^{2}	5
(Germany) K Kschwendt (Ukraine) E Tatarkova	2	2
10	(Russia) E Likhovtseva (Japan) A Sugiyama	6	6
(Italy) R Grande (United States) G Helgeson-Nielsen	6	6
(South Korea) E-h Kim (Japan) M Saeki	3	3
(South Africa) N de Villiers (Australia) L McShea	6^{6}	3
7	(United States) L Raymond (Australia) R Stubbs	7^{8}	6

Third round
3	(Spain) A Sánchez Vicario (Czech Republic) H Suková	6	6
10	(Russia) E Likhovtseva (Japan) A Sugiyama	3	2
(Italy) R Grande (United States) G Helgeson-Nielsen	7	0	3
7	(United States) L Raymond (Australia) R Stubbs	5	6	6

Quarterfinals
3	(Spain) A Sánchez Vicario (Czech Republic) H Suková	6	3	1
7	(United States) L Raymond (Australia) R Stubbs	4	6	6

=== Bottom half ===
==== Section 3 ====
First round
9	(Spain) C Martínez (Argentina) P Tarabini	6	4	3
(Belarus) O Barabanschikova (United States) E deLone	2	6	6
(Slovakia) K Habšudová (Ukraine) O Lugina	3	4
(South Africa) A Coetzer (France) S Testud	6	6
(Slovakia) J Husárová (Germany) B Rittner	2	6^{1}
(Poland) M Grzybowska (Thailand) T Tanasugarn	6	7^{7}
(Italy) S Farina (Argentina) L Montalvo	6	6^{5}	6
12	(Austria) B Schett (Switzerland) P Schnyder	4	7^{7}	1
17	(South Africa) M de Swardt (United States) D Graham	6	7^{8}
(Italy) L Golarsa (Argentina) M Paz	4	6^{6}
LL	(Italy) T Garbin (Italy) A Serra Zanetti	6^{2}	5
(Chinese Taipei) J Lee (Chinese Taipei) S-t Wang	7^{7}	7
(Argentina) I Gorrochategui (Romania) I Spîrlea	3	6	9
(United States) L McNeil (United States) C Rubin	6	4	11
(Hungary) V Csurgó (Japan) Y Yoshida	2	3
4	(France) A Fusai (France) N Tauziat	6	6

Second round
(Belarus) O Barabanschikova (United States) E deLone	2	5
(South Africa) A Coetzer (France) S Testud	6	7
(Poland) M Grzybowska (Thailand) T Tanasugarn	1	2
(Italy) S Farina (Argentina) L Montalvo	6	6
17	(South Africa) M de Swardt (United States) D Graham	6	6
(Chinese Taipei) J Lee (Chinese Taipei) S-t Wang	0	2
(United States) L McNeil (United States) C Rubin	6	6
4	(France) A Fusai (France) N Tauziat	2	1

Third round
(South Africa) A Coetzer (France) S Testud	6^{5}	4
(Italy) S Farina (Argentina) L Montalvo	7^{7}	6
17	(South Africa) M de Swardt (United States) D Graham	6	6
(United States) L McNeil (United States) C Rubin	1	2

Quarterfinals
(Italy) S Farina (Argentina) L Montalvo	2	6^{5}
17	(South Africa) M de Swardt (United States) D Graham	6	7^{7}

==== Section 4 ====
First round
8	(United States) K Adams (Netherlands) M Bollegraf	6^{0}	6	8
(Australia) D Jones (United States) K Po	7^{7}	2	6
(Bulgaria) P Stoyanova (France) N van Lottum	3	3
(Germany) M Babel (Germany) W Probst	6	6
(Australia) K Kunce (United States) C Morariu	3	6	7
(Netherlands) K Boogert (Australia) R McQuillan	6	1	5
(United States) S Cacic (France) M Pierce	7^{8}	3	3
14	(Australia) C Barclay (Australia) K-A Guse	6^{6}	6	6
15	(Argentina) F Labat (Belgium) D Van Roost	6	7
(Bulgaria) S Krivencheva (Australia) L Pleming	1	5
(South Korea) Y-j Cho (South Korea) S-h Park	2	5
Q	(Canada) M Drake (United States) L Osterloh	6	7
WC	(United Kingdom) L Ahl (United Kingdom) A Wainwright	4	2
(United States) A Frazier (United States) K Schlukebir	6	6
(Romania) R Dragomir (Croatia) I Majoli	1^{r}
2	(United States) L Davenport (Belarus) N Zvereva	3

Second round
8	(United States) K Adams (Netherlands) M Bollegraf
(Germany) M Babel (Germany) W Probst	w/o
(Australia) K Kunce (United States) C Morariu	2	6	3
14	(Australia) C Barclay (Australia) K-A Guse	6	4	6
15	(Argentina) F Labat (Belgium) D Van Roost	7	3	6
Q	(Canada) M Drake (United States) L Osterloh	5	6	3
(United States) A Frazier (United States) K Schlukebir	1	6	3
2	(United States) L Davenport (Belarus) N Zvereva	6	4	6

Third round
8	(United States) K Adams (Netherlands) M Bollegraf	3	4
14	(Australia) C Barclay (Australia) K-A Guse	6	6
15	(Argentina) F Labat (Belgium) D Van Roost	3	2
2	(United States) L Davenport (Belarus) N Zvereva	6	6

Quarterfinals
14	(Australia) C Barclay (Australia) K-A Guse	4	2
2	(United States) L Davenport (Belarus) N Zvereva	6	6
