= 1998 Wimbledon Championships =

- Date: 22 June – 5 July
- Edition: 112th
- Category: Grand Slam (ITF)
- Draw: 128S/64D/64XD
- Prize money: £7,207,590
- Surface: Grass
- Location: Church Road; SW19, Wimbledon, London, United Kingdom
- Venue: All England Lawn Tennis and Croquet Club

Champions

Men's singles
- (United States) Pete Sampras

Women's singles
- (Czech Republic) Jana Novotná

Men's doubles
- (Netherlands) Jacco Eltingh / (Netherlands) Paul Haarhuis

Women's doubles
- (Switzerland) Martina Hingis / (Czech Republic) Jana Novotná

Mixed doubles
- (United States) Serena Williams / (Belarus) Max Mirnyi

Boys' singles
- (Switzerland) Roger Federer

Girls' singles
- (Slovenia) Katarina Srebotnik

Boys' doubles
- (Switzerland) Roger Federer / (Belgium) Olivier Rochus

Girls' doubles
- (Denmark) Eva Dyrberg / (Croatia) Jelena Kostanić
- Wimbledon Championships

The 1998 Wimbledon Championships was a tennis tournament played on grass courts at the All England Lawn Tennis and Croquet Club in Wimbledon, London in the United Kingdom. It was the 112th edition of the Wimbledon Championships and was held from 22 June to 5 July 1998.

== Prize money ==
The total prize money for 1998 championships was £7,207,590. The winner of the men's title earned £435,000 while the women's singles champion earned £391,500.

Event	W	F	SF	QF	Round of 16	Round of 32	Round of 64	Round of 128
Men's singles	£435,000							
Women's singles	£391,500							
Men's doubles *	£178,220							—N/a
Women's doubles *	£154,160							—N/a
Mixed doubles *	£75,700							—N/a

_{* per team}

== Champions ==
=== Seniors ===
==== Men's singles ====
(United States) Pete Sampras defeated (Croatia) Goran Ivanišević, 6–7^{(2–7)}, 7–6^{(11–9)}, 6–4, 3–6, 6–2

- It was Sampras' 11th career Grand Slam singles title and his 5th at Wimbledon.

==== Women's singles ====
(Czech Republic) Jana Novotná defeated (France) Nathalie Tauziat, 6–4, 7–6^{(7–2)}

- It was Novotná's 1st and only career Grand Slam singles title.

==== Men's doubles ====
(Netherlands) Jacco Eltingh / (Netherlands) Paul Haarhuis defeated (Australia) Todd Woodbridge / (Australia) Mark Woodforde, 2–6, 6–4, 7–6^{(7–3)}, 5–7, 10–8

- It was Eltingh's 6th and last career Grand Slam doubles title and his 1st at Wimbledon. It was Haarhuis' 5th career Grand Slam doubles title and his 1st and only at Wimbledon.

==== Women's doubles ====
(Switzerland) Martina Hingis / (Czech Republic) Jana Novotná defeated (United States) Lindsay Davenport / (Belarus) Natasha Zvereva, 6–3, 3–6, 8–6

- It was Hingis' 5th career Grand Slam doubles title and her 2nd at Wimbledon. It was Novotná's 11th career Grand Slam doubles title and her 4th and last at Wimbledon.

==== Mixed doubles ====
(Belarus) Max Mirnyi / (United States) Serena Williams defeated (India) Mahesh Bhupathi / (Croatia) Mirjana Lučić, 6–4, 6–4

- It was Williams' 1st career Grand Slam mixed doubles title. It was Mirnyi's 1st career Grand Slam mixed doubles title.

=== Juniors ===
==== Boys' singles ====
(Switzerland) Roger Federer defeated (Georgia (country)) Irakli Labadze, 6–4, 6–4

==== Girls' singles ====
(Slovenia) Katarina Srebotnik defeated (Belgium) Kim Clijsters, 7–6^{(7–3)}, 6–3

==== Boys' doubles ====
(Switzerland) Roger Federer / (Belgium) Olivier Rochus defeated (France) Michaël Llodra / (Israel) Andy Ram, 3–6, 6–4, 7–5

==== Girls' doubles ====
(Denmark) Eva Dyrberg / (Croatia) Jelena Kostanić defeated (Slovenia) Petra Rampre / (Uzbekistan) Iroda Tulyaganova, 6–2, 7–6^{(7–5)}

== Singles seeds ==
=== Men's singles ===
1. (United States) Pete Sampras (champion)
2. (Chile) Marcelo Ríos (first round, lost to Francisco Clavet)
3. (Czech Republic) Petr Korda (quarterfinals, lost to Tim Henman)
4. (United Kingdom) Greg Rusedski (first round, lost to Mark Draper)
5. (Spain) Carlos Moyá (second round, lost to Hicham Arazi)
6. (Australia) Patrick Rafter (fourth round, lost to Tim Henman)
7. (Russia) Yevgeny Kafelnikov (first round, lost to Mark Philippoussis)
8. (France) Cédric Pioline (first round, lost to Marc Rosset)
9. (Netherlands) Richard Krajicek (semifinals, lost to Goran Ivanišević)
10. (Spain) Àlex Corretja (first round, lost to Justin Gimelstob)
11. (Sweden) Jonas Björkman (third round, lost to Jan Siemerink)
12. (United Kingdom) Tim Henman (semifinals, lost to Pete Sampras)
13. (United States) Andre Agassi (second round, lost to Tommy Haas)
14. (Croatia) Goran Ivanišević (final, lost to Pete Sampras)
15. (Slovakia) Karol Kučera (first round, lost to Vladimir Voltchkov)
16. (Spain) Félix Mantilla (third round, lost to Sébastien Grosjean)

=== Women's singles ===
1. (Switzerland) Martina Hingis (semifinals, lost to Jana Novotná)
2. (United States) Lindsay Davenport (quarterfinals, lost to Nathalie Tauziat)
3. (Czech Republic) Jana Novotná (champion)
4. (Germany) Steffi Graf (third round, lost to Natasha Zvereva)
5. (Spain) Arantxa Sánchez Vicario (quarterfinals, lost to Martina Hingis)
6. (United States) Monica Seles (quarterfinals, lost to Natasha Zvereva)
7. (United States) Venus Williams (quarterfinals, lost to Jana Novotná)
8. (Spain) Conchita Martínez (third round, lost to Sam Smith)
9. (South Africa) Amanda Coetzer (second round, lost to Naoko Sawamatsu)
10. (Romania) Irina Spîrlea (fourth round, lost to Jana Novotná)
11. (France) Mary Pierce (first round, lost to Elena Tatarkova)
12. (Russia) Anna Kournikova (withdrew before the tournament began)
13. (Switzerland) Patty Schnyder (second round, lost to Cara Black)
14. (France) Sandrine Testud (fourth round, lost to Monica Seles)
15. (Belgium) Dominique Van Roost (fourth round, lost to Arantxa Sánchez Vicario)
16. (France) Nathalie Tauziat (final, lost to Jana Novotná)

Preceded by 1998 French Open	Grand Slams	Succeeded by 1998 U.S. Open
