= 1998 US Open – Women's singles qualifying =

Women's singles qualifying
- 1998 US Open

Events
Singles	men	women		boys	girls
Doubles	men	women	mixed	boys	girls
WC Singles	men	women	quad
WC Doubles	men	women	quad
Legends	men	women	mixed

Qualification
Singles	men	women
Doubles	men	women
- US Open

The qualifying rounds for the 1998 US Open were played from 25 to 29 August 1998 at the USTA National Tennis Center in Flushing Meadows, New York City, United States.

== Seeds ==
1. (Germany) Jana Kandarr (second round)
2. (United States) Lilia Osterloh (qualifying competition)
3. (Japan) Haruka Inoue (second round)
4. (United States) Jolene Watanabe (second round)
5. (Russia) Elena Makarova (qualifying competition)
6. (Italy) Adriana Serra Zanetti (first round)
7. (France) Émilie Loit (second round)
8. (Spain) Conchita Martínez Granados (qualifying competition)
9. (Canada) Sonya Jeyaseelan (second round)
10. (Netherlands) Seda Noorlander (first round)
11. (Italy) Francesca Lubiani (second round)
12. (Belgium) Els Callens (qualifying competition)
13. (Belgium) Laurence Courtois (qualified)
14. (Austria) Karin Kschwendt (second round)
15. (Bulgaria) Pavlina Stoyanova (qualified)
16. (Australia) Annabel Ellwood (qualifying competition)
17. (Romania) Raluca Sandu (qualified)
18. (Japan) Shinobu Asagoe (qualifying competition)
19. (United States) Ginger Helgeson-Nielsen (second round)
20. (South Africa) Surina De Beer (qualifying competition)
21. (Colombia) Fabiola Zuluaga (qualified)
22. (France) Laurence Andretto (first round)
23. (Ukraine) Olga Lugina (second round)
24. (Poland) Aleksandra Olsza (qualified)
25. (Canada) Maureen Drake (first round)
26. (Greece) Christína Papadáki (qualifying competition)
27. (Japan) Rika Hiraki (second round)
28. (Luxembourg) Anne Kremer (qualified)
29. (Croatia) Silvija Talaja (qualifying competition)
30. (Russia) Evgenia Kulikovskaya (qualified)
31. (Italy) Tathiana Garbin (first round)
32. (South Africa) Liezel Horn (qualified)

== Qualifiers ==
1. (Germany) Marlene Weingärtner
2. (Romania) Raluca Sandu
3. (United States) Jackie Trail
4. (United States) Jean Okada
5. (Colombia) Fabiola Zuluaga
6. (Belgium) Laurence Courtois
7. (Poland) Aleksandra Olsza
8. (Germany) Miriam Schnitzer
9. (United States) Jill Craybas
10. (Bulgaria) Pavlina Stoyanova
11. (South Africa) Liezel Horn
12. (Slovenia) Tina Križan
13. (Czech Republic) Ludmila Richterová
14. (Federal Republic of Yugoslavia) Sandra Načuk
15. (Luxembourg) Anne Kremer
16. (Russia) Evgenia Kulikovskaya

== Draw ==
=== First qualifier ===
First round
1	(Germany) Jana Kandarr	6	6
(United States) Erika deLone	4	3
(Germany) Jasmin Wöhr	3	6	1
(Germany) Marlene Weingärtner	6	4	6
(Spain) Eva Bes	6	6
(Belgium) Daphne van de Zande	3	2
(Australia) Trudi Musgrave	6^{3}	7	2
20	(South Africa) Surina De Beer	7^{7}	5	6

Second round
1	(Germany) Jana Kandarr	1	6	3
(Germany) Marlene Weingärtner	6	3	6
(Spain) Eva Bes	0	5
20	(South Africa) Surina De Beer	6	7

Qualifying competition
(Germany) Marlene Weingärtner	3	7^{7}	6
20	(South Africa) Surina De Beer	6	6^{4}	0

=== Second qualifier ===
First round
17	(Romania) Raluca Sandu	6	7^{7}
(Paraguay) Larissa Schaerer	4	6^{1}
(Slovakia) Janette Husárová	5	6	1
(France) Noëlle van Lottum	7	3	6
(Japan) Saori Obata	6	6
(Japan) Naoko Kijimuta	1	2
(Hungary) Anna Földényi	3	3
16	(Australia) Annabel Ellwood	6	6

Second round
17	(Romania) Raluca Sandu	7	6
(France) Noëlle van Lottum	5	1
(Japan) Saori Obata	4	7^{8}	3
16	(Australia) Annabel Ellwood	6	6^{6}	6

Qualifying competition
17	(Romania) Raluca Sandu	3	6	6
16	(Australia) Annabel Ellwood	6	3	2

=== Third qualifier ===
First round
11	(Italy) Francesca Lubiani	6	7
(Israel) Hila Rosen	3	5
WC	(United States) Jackie Trail	7	2	7
(France) Ségolène Berger	5	6	5
(Czech Republic) Lenka Cenková	3	2
(Australia) Kristine Kunce	6	6
(South Korea) Kim Eun-ha	7^{7}	3	6
25	(Canada) Maureen Drake	6^{4}	6	4

Second round
11	(Italy) Francesca Lubiani	6	4	3
WC	(United States) Jackie Trail	1	6	6
(Australia) Kristine Kunce	7^{7}	6
(South Korea) Kim Eun-ha	6^{4}	1

Qualifying competition
WC	(United States) Jackie Trail	6	3	6
(Australia) Kristine Kunce	4	6	4

=== Fourth qualifier ===
First round
31	(Italy) Tathiana Garbin	2	1^{r}
(Czech Republic) Radka Pelikánová	6	2
(United States) Katie Schlukebir	3	6	3
WC	(United States) Jean Okada	6	1	6
(United Kingdom) Lorna Woodroffe	6	7
(Argentina) María Fernanda Landa	3	5
(Slovakia) Zuzana Váleková	6^{1}	1
5	(Russia) Elena Makarova	7^{7}	6

Second round
(Czech Republic) Radka Pelikánová	4	3
WC	(United States) Jean Okada	6	6
(United Kingdom) Lorna Woodroffe	1	1
5	(Russia) Elena Makarova	6	6

Qualifying competition
WC	(United States) Jean Okada	6	7
5	(Russia) Elena Makarova	2	5

=== Fifth qualifier ===
First round
3	(Japan) Haruka Inoue	6	6
WC	(United States) Victoria Hunt	2	0
(Japan) Misumi Miyauchi	3	0
(Russia) Nadia Petrova	6	6
(Hungary) Virág Csurgó	5	3
(Mexico) Jessica Fernández	7	6
(United States) Jane Chi	2	6	3
21	(Colombia) Fabiola Zuluaga	6	2	6

Second round
3	(Japan) Haruka Inoue	3	1
(Russia) Nadia Petrova	6	6
(Mexico) Jessica Fernández	2	1
21	(Colombia) Fabiola Zuluaga	6	6

Qualifying competition
(Russia) Nadia Petrova	6^{4}	6	4
21	(Colombia) Fabiola Zuluaga	7^{7}	3	6

=== Sixth qualifier ===
First round
29	(Croatia) Silvija Talaja	6	6
(Italy) Sandra Cecchini	3	2
(Argentina) Celeste Contín	3	4
(Austria) Evelyn Fauth	6	6
(Israel) Tzipora Obziler	6	3	2
(United Kingdom) Louise Latimer	1	6	6
(France) Karolina Jagieniak	4	0
13	(Belgium) Laurence Courtois	6	6

Second round
29	(Croatia) Silvija Talaja	4	7^{10}	6
(Austria) Evelyn Fauth	6	6^{8}	2
(United Kingdom) Louise Latimer	4	1
13	(Belgium) Laurence Courtois	6	6

Qualifying competition
29	(Croatia) Silvija Talaja	5	2
13	(Belgium) Laurence Courtois	7	6

=== Seventh qualifier ===
First round
9	(Canada) Sonya Jeyaseelan	6	6
(South Korea) Jeon Mi-ra	1	4
(Canada) Patricia Hy-Boulais	6	5	3
(Austria) Patricia Wartusch	4	7	6
(Czech Republic) Milena Nekvapilová	4	3
(Spain) Paula Hermida	6	6
(Kazakhstan) Irina Selyutina	2	2
24	(Poland) Aleksandra Olsza	6	6

Second round
9	(Canada) Sonya Jeyaseelan	4	2
(Austria) Patricia Wartusch	6	6
(Spain) Paula Hermida	0	3
24	(Poland) Aleksandra Olsza	6	6

Qualifying competition
(Austria) Patricia Wartusch	1	2
24	(Poland) Aleksandra Olsza	6	6

=== Eighth qualifier ===
First round
27	(Japan) Rika Hiraki	6	6
(Italy) Germana Di Natale	3	3
(United States) Aurandrea Narvaez	0	3
(Germany) Miriam Schnitzer	6	6
(Tunisia) Selima Sfar	7^{7}	4	2
(Hungary) Kira Nagy	6^{2}	6	6
(United Kingdom) Karen Cross	6	4	3
8	(Spain) Conchita Martínez Granados	4	6	6

Second round
27	(Japan) Rika Hiraki	4	1
(Germany) Miriam Schnitzer	6	6
(Hungary) Kira Nagy	3	2
8	(Spain) Conchita Martínez Granados	6	6

Qualifying competition
(Germany) Miriam Schnitzer	6	6
8	(Spain) Conchita Martínez Granados	1	1

=== Ninth qualifier ===
First round
7	(France) Émilie Loit	6	7
(Germany) Christina Singer	1	5
WC	(United States) Jill Craybas	6	6
WC	(United States) Sarah Taylor	1	2
(Czech Republic) Petra Langrová	4	6	4
(Bulgaria) Svetlana Krivencheva	6	2	6
(Netherlands) Amanda Hopmans	0	6	4
23	(Ukraine) Olga Lugina	6	2	6

Second round
7	(France) Émilie Loit	4	6^{4}
WC	(United States) Jill Craybas	6	7^{7}
(Bulgaria) Svetlana Krivencheva	6	6
23	(Ukraine) Olga Lugina	3	3

Qualifying competition
WC	(United States) Jill Craybas	7	2	6
(Bulgaria) Svetlana Krivencheva	5	6	3

=== Tenth qualifier ===
First round
18	(Japan) Shinobu Asagoe	6	3	6
(Germany) Gabriela Kučerová	2	6	2
(France) Sophie Georges	6	6
(United States) Eleni Rossides	3	0
(Hungary) Nóra Köves	6	1	6
(Czech Republic) Denisa Chládková	2	6	3
(Hungary) Petra Mandula	6	4	4
15	(Bulgaria) Pavlina Stoyanova	1	6	6

Second round
18	(Japan) Shinobu Asagoe	3	6	6
(France) Sophie Georges	6	3	1
(Hungary) Nóra Köves	3	6^{6}
15	(Bulgaria) Pavlina Stoyanova	6	7^{8}

Qualifying competition
18	(Japan) Shinobu Asagoe	6	0	3
15	(Bulgaria) Pavlina Stoyanova	3	6	6

=== Eleventh qualifier ===
First round
10	(Netherlands) Seda Noorlander	6	4	4
(United Kingdom) Joanne Ward	4	6	6
(Spain) Gisela Riera Roura	5	4
(United States) Lindsay Lee	7	6
(Australia) Siobhan Drake-Brockman	7^{7}	6
(Italy) Francesca Romano	6^{3}	2
(United Kingdom) Lucie Ahl	3	1
32	(South Africa) Liezel Horn	6	6

Second round
(United Kingdom) Joanne Ward	4	2
(United States) Lindsay Lee	6	6
(Australia) Siobhan Drake-Brockman	3	5
32	(South Africa) Liezel Horn	6	7

Qualifying competition
(United States) Lindsay Lee	3	4
32	(South Africa) Liezel Horn	6	6

=== Twelfth qualifier ===
First round
22	(France) Laurence Andretto	4	4
(Indonesia) Wynne Prakusya	6	6
(South Korea) Cho Yoon-jeong	4	6	6
(United States) Ann Wunderlich	6	2	4
(Romania) Mira Radu	7^{8}	3	1
(Slovenia) Tina Križan	6^{6}	6	6
(Spain) Alicia Ortuño	2	0
4	(United States) Jolene Watanabe	6	6

Second round
(Indonesia) Wynne Prakusya	6	2	1
(South Korea) Cho Yoon-jeong	3	6	6
(Slovenia) Tina Križan	2	6	6
4	(United States) Jolene Watanabe	6	2	1

Qualifying competition
(South Korea) Cho Yoon-jeong	3	4
(Slovenia) Tina Križan	6	6

=== Thirteenth qualifier ===
First round
6	(Italy) Adriana Serra Zanetti	6^{6}	5
(Hungary) Petra Gáspár	7^{8}	7
(India) Nirupama Vaidyanathan	6	0	2
(Czech Republic) Ludmila Richterová	1	6	6
(Australia) Amanda Grahame	3	6	6
(Argentina) Geraldine Aizenberg	6	4	1
(Slovenia) Petra Rampre	3	2
19	(United States) Ginger Helgeson-Nielsen	6	6

Second round
(Hungary) Petra Gáspár	4	2
(Czech Republic) Ludmila Richterová	6	6
(Australia) Amanda Grahame	5	7	6
19	(United States) Ginger Helgeson-Nielsen	7	5	4

Qualifying competition
(Czech Republic) Ludmila Richterová	7	1	6
(Australia) Amanda Grahame	5	6	1

=== Fourteenth qualifier ===
First round
26	(Greece) Christína Papadáki	7^{7}	7^{7}
(United Kingdom) Julie Pullin	6^{5}	6^{5}
(Russia) Elena Dementieva	6^{4}	2
(Italy) Alice Canepa	7^{7}	6
(Federal Republic of Yugoslavia) Sandra Načuk	7	6
(Canada) Martina Nejedly	5	4
(United Kingdom) Claire Taylor	1	0
14	(Austria) Karin Kschwendt	6	6

Second round
26	(Greece) Christína Papadáki	6	6
(Italy) Alice Canepa	3	4
(Federal Republic of Yugoslavia) Sandra Načuk	6	6
14	(Austria) Karin Kschwendt	4	4

Qualifying competition
26	(Greece) Christína Papadáki	6	1	1
(Federal Republic of Yugoslavia) Sandra Načuk	3	6	6

=== Fifteenth qualifier ===
First round
12	(Belgium) Els Callens	6^{5}	6	6
(Australia) Rennae Stubbs	7^{7}	2	1
(Germany) Julia Abe	6	6
(Czech Republic) Eva Martincová	2	1
Alt	(Australia) Lisa McShea	5	6	7^{7}
(Italy) Maria Paola Zavagli	7	3	6^{5}
(Australia) Evie Dominikovic	6	4	2
28	(Luxembourg) Anne Kremer	4	6	6

Second round
12	(Belgium) Els Callens	4	6	6
(Germany) Julia Abe	6	3	3
Alt	(Australia) Lisa McShea	2	0
28	(Luxembourg) Anne Kremer	6	6

Qualifying competition
12	(Belgium) Els Callens	4	1
28	(Luxembourg) Anne Kremer	6	6

=== Sixteenth qualifier ===
First round
30	(Russia) Evgenia Kulikovskaya	5	6	7
(Australia) Catherine Barclay	7	3	5
WC	(United States) Holly Parkinson	6	6
(Poland) Katarzyna Nowak	0	2
WC	(United States) Tracy Singian	6	4	6
WC	(United States) Jennifer Poulos	4	6	4
(Spain) Rosa María Andrés Rodríguez	0	2
2	(United States) Lilia Osterloh	6	6

Second round
30	(Russia) Evgenia Kulikovskaya	6	6
WC	(United States) Holly Parkinson	2	1
WC	(United States) Tracy Singian	5	2
2	(United States) Lilia Osterloh	7	6

Qualifying competition
30	(Russia) Evgenia Kulikovskaya	7	5
2	(United States) Lilia Osterloh	5	5
