= 1998 US Open – Men's singles qualifying =

Men's singles qualifying
- 1998 US Open

Events
Singles	men	women		boys	girls
Doubles	men	women	mixed	boys	girls
WC Singles	men	women	quad
WC Doubles	men	women	quad
Legends	men	women	mixed

Qualification
Singles	men	women
Doubles	men	women
- US Open

Players who neither had high enough rankings nor received wild cards to enter the main draw of the annual US Open Tennis Championships participated in a qualifying tournament held over several days before the event.

== Seeds ==
1. (Argentina) Martin Rodriguez (qualified)
2. (Germany) Rainer Schüttler (second round)
3. (Italy) Laurence Tieleman (second round)
4. (Australia) Michael Tebbutt (second round)
5. (Japan) Takao Suzuki (second round)
6. (South Africa) Grant Stafford (qualifying competition)
7. (United States) Brian MacPhie (second round)
8. (Italy) Vincenzo Santopadre (second round)
9. (Switzerland) Ivo Heuberger (second round)
10. (South Africa) Neville Godwin (qualifying competition)
11. (Brazil) André Sá (first round)
12. (Finland) Tuomas Ketola (second round)
13. (Czech Republic) Tomáš Zíb (first round)
14. (Australia) Lleyton Hewitt (second round)
15. (Germany) Lars Burgsmüller (first round)
16. (Austria) Wolfgang Schranz (first round)
17. (Germany) Alex Rădulescu (qualified)
18. (Italy) Cristiano Caratti (first round)
19. (Germany) Michael Kohlmann (qualified)
20. (France) Arnaud Di Pasquale (qualified)
21. (Australia) Peter Tramacchi (first round)
22. (Argentina) Francisco Cabello (first round)
23. (Germany) Bernd Karbacher (qualified)
24. (Australia) Mark Draper (first round)
25. (Argentina) Sebastián Prieto (second round)
26. (Czech Republic) Petr Luxa (qualifying competition)
27. (United States) Michael Sell (first round)
28. (Belarus) Vladimir Voltchkov (qualifying competition)
29. (Netherlands) Peter Wessels (first round)
30. (France) Gérard Solvès (qualifying competition)
31. (Italy) Stefano Pescosolido (qualifying competition)
32. (Brazil) Adriano Ferreira (first round)

== Qualifiers ==
1. (Argentina) Martin Rodriguez
2. (South Korea) Yoon Yong-il
3. (Australia) Wayne Arthurs
4. (France) Jean-Baptiste Perlant
5. (Australia) James Sekulov
6. (Germany) Karsten Braasch
7. (United States) Mark Merklein
8. (South Africa) David Nainkin
9. (Italy) Giorgio Galimberti
10. (Germany) Bernd Karbacher
11. (Israel) Eyal Erlich
12. (Israel) Noam Behr
13. (Germany) Michael Kohlmann
14. (France) Arnaud Di Pasquale
15. (Germany) Alex Rădulescu
16. (United States) David Wheaton

== Qualifying draw ==
Key

- Q = Qualifier
- WC = Wild card
- LL = Lucky loser
- Alt = Alternate
- ITF = ITF entry
- PR = Protected ranking
- SR = Special ranking
- SE = Special exempt
- JE = Junior exempt
- JR = Junior Accelerator Programme entrant
- CO = College Accelerator Programme entrant
- NG = Next Gen Accelerator Program entrant
- w/o = Walkover
- r = Retired
- d = Defaulted

=== First qualifier ===
First round
1	(Argentina) Martin Rodriguez	6	6
(France) Julien Boutter	4	1
(Spain) Quino Muñoz	5	2
WC	(United States) Wynn Criswell	7	6
(Romania) Gabriel Trifu	6	6
(Belgium) Denis van Uffelen	3	4
(Israel) Eyal Ran	2	6	1
31	(Italy) Stefano Pescosolido	6	1	6

Second round
1	(Argentina) Martin Rodriguez	6	6
WC	(United States) Wynn Criswell	4	1
(Romania) Gabriel Trifu	6	2
31	(Italy) Stefano Pescosolido	7	6

Qualifying competition
1	(Argentina) Martin Rodriguez	6	5	7
31	(Italy) Stefano Pescosolido	2	7	5

=== Second qualifier ===
First round
2	(Germany) Rainer Schüttler	6	2
WC	(United States) Mike Bryan	2	0^{r}
(Czech Republic) Ota Fukárek	5	3
(South Korea) Yoon Yong-il	7	6
(Netherlands) Marc Merry	6	3
(Slovenia) Iztok Božič	7	6
(United Kingdom) Nick Gould	6	7
32	(Brazil) Adriano Ferreira	3	6

Second round
2	(Germany) Rainer Schüttler	7	6	2
(South Korea) Yoon Yong-il	6	7	6
(Slovenia) Iztok Božič	6	2	6
(United Kingdom) Nick Gould	3	6	1

Qualifying competition
(South Korea) Yoon Yong-il	3	6	6
(Slovenia) Iztok Božič	6	2	4

=== Third qualifier ===
First round
3	(Italy) Laurence Tieleman	7	4	6
(Canada) Frédéric Niemeyer	6	6	3
(Australia) Wayne Arthurs	7	7
(Japan) Gouichi Motomura	6	5
(United States) Wade McGuire	6	6
(Finland) Tommi Lenho	4	2
(United States) David Witt	5	7	6
30	(France) Gérard Solvès	7	5	7

Second round
3	(Italy) Laurence Tieleman	4	2
(Australia) Wayne Arthurs	6	6
(United States) Wade McGuire	2	6
30	(France) Gérard Solvès	6	7

Qualifying competition
(Australia) Wayne Arthurs	4	6	6
30	(France) Gérard Solvès	6	2	4

=== Fourth qualifier ===
First round
4	(Australia) Michael Tebbutt	6	6
(Japan) Hideki Kaneko	4	3
(United States) David Caldwell	6	3	3
(France) Jean-Baptiste Perlant	3	6	6
WC	(United States) Patrick McEnroe	4	2
(United States) Michael Joyce	6	6
(United States) Doug Flach	6	7
29	(Netherlands) Peter Wessels	1	6

Second round
4	(Australia) Michael Tebbutt	4	7	5
(France) Jean-Baptiste Perlant	6	6	7
(United States) Michael Joyce	5	4
(United States) Doug Flach	7	6

Qualifying competition
(France) Jean-Baptiste Perlant	3	6	6
(United States) Doug Flach	6	2	2

=== Fifth qualifier ===
First round
5	(Japan) Takao Suzuki	6	6
(Senegal) Yahiya Doumbia	3	2
(United Kingdom) Barry Cowan	4	6
(Australia) James Sekulov	6	7
(United States) Jim Thomas	6	6
(Australia) Steven Randjelovic	2	4
(United States) Scott Humphries	6	4
28	(Belarus) Vladimir Voltchkov	7	6

Second round
5	(Japan) Takao Suzuki	5	3
(Australia) James Sekulov	7	6
(United States) Jim Thomas	6	2	1
28	(Belarus) Vladimir Voltchkov	3	6	6

Qualifying competition
(Australia) James Sekulov	7	4	6
28	(Belarus) Vladimir Voltchkov	6	6	2

=== Sixth qualifier ===
First round
6	(South Africa) Grant Stafford	6	6
(France) Régis Lavergne	3	2
(Israel) Lior Mor	6	7
(Russia) Andrei Merinov	3	5
(Mexico) Mariano Sanchez	6	6
WC	(United States) Kevin Kim	4	4
(Germany) Karsten Braasch	6	6
27	(United States) Michael Sell	4	4

Second round
6	(South Africa) Grant Stafford	6	6
(Israel) Lior Mor	3	3
(Mexico) Mariano Sanchez	3	3
(Germany) Karsten Braasch	6	6

Qualifying competition
6	(South Africa) Grant Stafford	3	7	3
(Germany) Karsten Braasch	6	6	6

=== Seventh qualifier ===
First round
7	(United States) Brian MacPhie	6	6
WC	(United States) Marc Silva	3	4
(France) Rodolphe Gilbert	6	6
(Italy) Daniele Bracciali	2	2
(United States) Mark Merklein	7	7
WC	(United States) Adam Seri	6	5
(South Africa) Justin Bower	2	3
25	(Argentina) Sebastián Prieto	6	6

Second round
7	(United States) Brian MacPhie	5	2
(France) Rodolphe Gilbert	7	6
(United States) Mark Merklein	6	6
25	(Argentina) Sebastián Prieto	4	4

Qualifying competition
(France) Rodolphe Gilbert	4	6	6
(United States) Mark Merklein	6	3	7

=== Eighth qualifier ===
First round
8	(Italy) Vincenzo Santopadre	6	7
(France) Charles Aufy	2	5
(South Africa) David Nainkin	1	6	6
Alt	(South Africa) Damien Roberts	6	2	3
(United States) Oren Motevassel	7	6
(South Africa) Jeff Coetzee	5	3
(United States) Cecil Mamiit	6	3	3
26	(Czech Republic) Petr Luxa	3	6	6

Second round
8	(Italy) Vincenzo Santopadre	6	2	3
(South Africa) David Nainkin	4	6	6
(United States) Oren Motevassel	4	6	2
26	(Czech Republic) Petr Luxa	6	3	6

Qualifying competition
(South Africa) David Nainkin	7	6	6
26	(Czech Republic) Petr Luxa	5	7	4

=== Ninth qualifier ===
First round
9	(Switzerland) Ivo Heuberger	7	6
(France) Frédéric Fontang	6	1
(Italy) Giorgio Galimberti	4	7	3
(Italy) Mosé Navarra	6	6	0^{r}
(Netherlands) Martijn Belgraver	7	6
(Portugal) João Cunha e Silva	6	4
(Israel) Harel Levy	6	6
24	(Australia) Mark Draper	4	4

Second round
9	(Switzerland) Ivo Heuberger	3	5
(Italy) Giorgio Galimberti	6	7
(Netherlands) Martijn Belgraver	5	3
(Israel) Harel Levy	7	6

Qualifying competition
(Italy) Giorgio Galimberti	4	6	6
(Israel) Harel Levy	6	2	3

=== Tenth qualifier ===
First round
10	(South Africa) Neville Godwin	7	6
(Israel) Amir Hadad	5	2
(Spain) Óscar Burrieza	5	6	4
(France) Olivier Delaître	7	3	6
(Austria) Gerald Mandl	6	6	5
(Argentina) Andrés Zingman	7	4	7
(Belarus) Max Mirnyi	6	4	4
23	(Germany) Bernd Karbacher	3	6	6

Second round
10	(South Africa) Neville Godwin	4
(France) Olivier Delaître	2^{r}
(Argentina) Andrés Zingman	2	6	5
23	(Germany) Bernd Karbacher	6	4	7

Qualifying competition
10	(South Africa) Neville Godwin	7	3	6
23	(Germany) Bernd Karbacher	5	6	7

=== Eleventh qualifier ===
First round
11	(Brazil) André Sá	6	3	3
(Israel) Eyal Erlich	4	6	6
(Israel) Nir Welgreen	7	1	2
(Australia) Michael Hill	6	6	6
(Australia) Toby Mitchell	6	5	6
(New Zealand) Teo Susnjak	3	7	0
(Haiti) Ronald Agénor	7	6
22	(Argentina) Francisco Cabello	5	4

Second round
(Israel) Eyal Erlich	6	3	7
(Australia) Michael Hill	1	6	5
(Australia) Toby Mitchell	2	6	7
(Haiti) Ronald Agénor	6	3	6

Qualifying competition
(Israel) Eyal Erlich	6	7
(Australia) Toby Mitchell	4	6

=== Twelfth qualifier ===
First round
12	(Finland) Tuomas Ketola	7	1	6
(France) Stéphane Simian	5	6	4
(Spain) Sergi Duran-Bernad	7	3	7
(United States) David DiLucia	6	6	5
(France) Jean-François Bachelot	4	6	0
(Venezuela) Maurice Ruah	6	3	6
(Israel) Noam Behr	6	6	6
21	(Australia) Peter Tramacchi	7	3	3

Second round
12	(Finland) Tuomas Ketola	4	6	3
(Spain) Sergi Duran-Bernad	6	3	6
(Venezuela) Maurice Ruah	2	6	2
(Israel) Noam Behr	6	4	6

Qualifying competition
(Spain) Sergi Duran-Bernad	4	6	4
(Israel) Noam Behr	6	3	6

=== Thirteenth qualifier ===
First round
13	(Czech Republic) Tomáš Zíb	2	3
(France) Antony Dupuis	6	6
(United States) Jared Palmer	6	3	4
(Australia) Ben Ellwood	3	6	6
(Switzerland) George Bastl	6	4	7
WC	(United States) Thomas Blake	3	6	5
WC	(United States) Adam Peterson	6	4
19	(Germany) Michael Kohlmann	7	6

Second round
(France) Antony Dupuis	6	4	7
(Australia) Ben Ellwood	4	6	6
(Switzerland) George Bastl	5	2
19	(Germany) Michael Kohlmann	7	6

Qualifying competition
(France) Antony Dupuis	6	6	3
19	(Germany) Michael Kohlmann	1	7	6

=== Fourteenth qualifier ===
First round
14	(Australia) Lleyton Hewitt	6	4	6
(Romania) Răzvan Sabău	0	6	2
(France) Stéphane Huet	7	6
(Australia) Todd Larkham	6	2
(United Kingdom) Danny Sapsford	3	6	7
(France) Arnaud Boetsch	6	3	6
(Australia) Grant Doyle	6	4
20	(France) Arnaud Di Pasquale	7	6

Second round
14	(Australia) Lleyton Hewitt	7	6	4
(France) Stéphane Huet	5	7	6
(United Kingdom) Danny Sapsford	3	3
20	(France) Arnaud Di Pasquale	6	6

Qualifying competition
(France) Stéphane Huet	5	6
20	(France) Arnaud Di Pasquale	7	7

=== Fifteenth qualifier ===
First round
15	(Germany) Lars Burgsmüller	4	4
(South Africa) Wesley Whitehouse	6	6
(United States) Hugo Armando	1	1
(South Africa) Kevin Ullyett	6	6
(Russia) Andrei Stoliarov	6	3	6
(United Kingdom) Miles Maclagan	2	6	3
(South Korea) Lee Hyung-taik	5	4
17	(Germany) Alex Rădulescu	7	6

Second round
(South Africa) Wesley Whitehouse	6	6
(South Africa) Kevin Ullyett	3	1
(Russia) Andrei Stoliarov	3	5
17	(Germany) Alex Rădulescu	6	7

Qualifying competition
(South Africa) Wesley Whitehouse	6	3	5
17	(Germany) Alex Rădulescu	4	6	7

=== Sixteenth qualifier ===
First round
16	(Austria) Wolfgang Schranz	7	6	5
WC	(United States) James Blake	6	7	7
(South Africa) Louis Vosloo	6	7
(United States) Andrew Rueb	2	5
(Japan) Yaoki Ishii	5	3
(United States) David Wheaton	7	6
(Australia) Allen Belobrajdic	4	6	6
18	(Italy) Cristiano Caratti	6	3	3

Second round
WC	(United States) James Blake	6	7
(South Africa) Louis Vosloo	4	5
(United States) David Wheaton	5	6	7
(Australia) Allen Belobrajdic	7	1	6

Qualifying competition
WC	(United States) James Blake	4	2
(United States) David Wheaton	6	6
