= 1998 US Open – Women's doubles qualifying =

Women's doubles qualifying
- 1998 US Open

Events
Singles	men	women		boys	girls
Doubles	men	women	mixed	boys	girls
WC Singles	men	women	quad
WC Doubles	men	women	quad
Legends	men	women	mixed

Qualification
Singles	men	women
Doubles	men	women
- US Open

The qualifying rounds for the 1998 US Open were played from 25 to 29 August 1998 at the USTA National Tennis Center in Flushing Meadows, New York City, United States.

== Seeds ==
1. (Canada) Maureen Drake / (United States) Lindsay Lee (qualified)
2. (Czech Republic) Petra Langrová / (United States) Samantha Reeves (first round)
3. (Zimbabwe) Cara Black / (Kazakhstan) Irina Selyutina (qualified)
4. (United Kingdom) Julie Pullin / (United Kingdom) Lorna Woodroffe (qualifying competition, lucky losers)
5. (United States) Rebecca Jensen / (United States) Melissa Mazzotta (first round)
6. (Australia) Danielle Jones / (Canada) Renata Kolbovic (qualifying competition)
7. (Czech Republic) Lenka Cenková / (Russia) Evgenia Kulikovskaya (qualified)
8. (Italy) Alice Canepa / (Italy) Tathiana Garbin (qualifying competition)

== Qualifiers ==
1. (Canada) Maureen Drake / (United States) Lindsay Lee
2. (United States) Lilia Osterloh / (United States) Mashona Washington
3. (Zimbabwe) Cara Black / (Kazakhstan) Irina Selyutina
4. (Czech Republic) Lenka Cenková / (Russia) Evgenia Kulikovskaya

== Lucky losers ==
1. (United Kingdom) Julie Pullin / (United Kingdom) Lorna Woodroffe

== Draw ==
=== First qualifier ===
First round
1	(Canada) Maureen Drake (United States) Lindsay Lee	6	6
(South Africa) Surina De Beer (South Africa) Jessica Steck	2	1
(Poland) Aleksandra Olsza (Germany) Jasmin Wöhr	3	4
8	(Italy) Alice Canepa (Italy) Tathiana Garbin	6	6

Qualifying competition
1	(Canada) Maureen Drake (United States) Lindsay Lee	6	6
8	(Italy) Alice Canepa (Italy) Tathiana Garbin	1	1

=== Second qualifier ===
First round
2	(Czech Republic) Petra Langrová (United States) Samantha Reeves	3	6	3
WC	(United States) Lilia Osterloh (United States) Mashona Washington	6	3	6
(Italy) Sandra Cecchini (Italy) Flora Perfetti	4	6	7
5	(United States) Rebecca Jensen (United States) Melissa Mazzotta	6	3	5

Qualifying competition
WC	(United States) Lilia Osterloh (United States) Mashona Washington	6	3	6
(Italy) Sandra Cecchini (Italy) Flora Perfetti	3	6	0

=== Third qualifier ===
First round
3	(Zimbabwe) Cara Black (Kazakhstan) Irina Selyutina	4	7	6
(Paraguay) Larissa Schaerer (Colombia) Fabiola Zuluaga	6	5	4
WC	(United States) Anne Miller (United States) Ann Wunderlich	1	5
6	(Australia) Danielle Jones (Canada) Renata Kolbovic	6	7

Qualifying competition
3	(Zimbabwe) Cara Black (Kazakhstan) Irina Selyutina	6	6
6	(Australia) Danielle Jones (Canada) Renata Kolbovic	4	2

=== Fourth qualifier ===
First round
4	(United Kingdom) Julie Pullin (United Kingdom) Lorna Woodroffe	6	6
(United States) Jean Okada (Czech Republic) Hana Šromová	1	4
WC	(United States) Stephanie Nickitas (United States) Julie Scott	7^{7}	1	2
7	(Czech Republic) Lenka Cenková (Russia) Evgenia Kulikovskaya	6^{1}	6	6

Qualifying competition
4	(United Kingdom) Julie Pullin (United Kingdom) Lorna Woodroffe	2	7	3
7	(Czech Republic) Lenka Cenková (Russia) Evgenia Kulikovskaya	6	5	6
