= 1998 US Open – Men's doubles qualifying =

Men's doubles qualifying
- 1998 US Open

Events
Singles	men	women		boys	girls
Doubles	men	women	mixed	boys	girls
WC Singles	men	women	quad
WC Doubles	men	women	quad
Legends	men	women	mixed

Qualification
Singles	men	women
Doubles	men	women
- US Open

The qualifying rounds for the 1998 US Open were played from 25 to 29 August 1998 at the USTA National Tennis Center in Flushing Meadows, New York City, United States.

== Seeds ==
1. (Czech Republic) Ctislav Doseděl / (Netherlands) Sander Groen (first round)
2. (Argentina) Martín Rodríguez / (Brazil) André Sá (qualifying competition, Lucky losers)
3. (Australia) Grant Silcock / (South Africa) Myles Wakefield (qualified)
4. (Portugal) João Cunha e Silva / (Brazil) Adriano Ferreira (first round)
5. (Germany) Michael Kohlmann / (Venezuela) Maurice Ruah (qualified)
6. (Brazil) Nelson Aerts / (Japan) Gouichi Motomura (qualifying competition)
7. (South Africa) Lan Bale / (United Kingdom) Danny Sapsford (qualified)
8. (Australia) Jamie Holmes / (Australia) Andrew Painter (qualifying competition)

== Qualifiers ==
1. (United States) Scott Humphries / (United States) Jared Palmer
2. (South Africa) Lan Bale / (United Kingdom) Danny Sapsford
3. (Australia) Grant Silcock / (South Africa) Myles Wakefield
4. (Germany) Michael Kohlmann / (Venezuela) Maurice Ruah

== Lucky losers ==
1. (Argentina) Martín Rodríguez / (Brazil) André Sá

== Draw ==
=== First qualifier ===
First round
1	(Czech Republic) Ctislav Doseděl (Netherlands) Sander Groen	6	2	5
WC	(United States) Scott Humphries (United States) Jared Palmer	2	6	7
WC	(United States) Geoff Abrams (United States) Edward Carter	5	6	1
8	(Australia) Jamie Holmes (Australia) Andrew Painter	7	4	6

Qualifying competition
WC	(United States) Scott Humphries (United States) Jared Palmer	6	6
8	(Australia) Jamie Holmes (Australia) Andrew Painter	3	4

=== Second qualifier ===
First round
2	(Argentina) Martín Rodríguez (Brazil) André Sá	6	7
(Czech Republic) Petr Luxa (Israel) Eyal Ran	1	6
WC	(United States) Michael Joyce (United States) David Witt	4	6	6
7	(South Africa) Lan Bale (United Kingdom) Danny Sapsford	6	1	7

Qualifying competition
2	(Argentina) Martín Rodríguez (Brazil) André Sá	7	3	6
7	(South Africa) Lan Bale (United Kingdom) Danny Sapsford	5	6	7

=== Third qualifier ===
First round
3	(Australia) Grant Silcock (South Africa) Myles Wakefield	4	7	6
(South Africa) Jeff Coetzee (South Africa) Damien Roberts	6	6	4
(United States) James Blake (United States) Thomas Blake	6	4
6	(Brazil) Nelson Aerts (Japan) Gouichi Motomura	7	6

Qualifying competition
3	(Australia) Grant Silcock (South Africa) Myles Wakefield	4	6	6
6	(Brazil) Nelson Aerts (Japan) Gouichi Motomura	6	3	2

=== Fourth qualifier ===
First round
4	(Portugal) João Cunha e Silva (Brazil) Adriano Ferreira	4	5
(Italy) Mosé Navarra (Italy) Vincenzo Santopadre	6	7
(Japan) Takao Suzuki (United States) Jim Thomas	6	4	0
5	(Germany) Michael Kohlmann (Venezuela) Maurice Ruah	2	6	6

Qualifying competition
(Italy) Mosé Navarra (Italy) Vincenzo Santopadre	6	6	3
5	(Germany) Michael Kohlmann (Venezuela) Maurice Ruah	4	7	6
