= David Nainkin =

South African tennis player

- Country (sports): South Africa
- Residence: Los Angeles, California, United States
- Born: 20 September 1970 (age 55) Durban, South Africa
- Height: 6 ft 0 in (1.83 m)
- Turned pro: 1992
- Plays: Right-handed
- Prize money: US$501,132

Singles
- Career record: 27–45
- Career titles: 0
- Highest ranking: No. 132 (8 January 1999)

Grand Slam singles results
- Australian Open: 1R (1994, 1996)
- Wimbledon: 2R (1998)
- US Open: 3R (1998)

Doubles
- Career record: 8–20
- Career titles: 0
- Highest ranking: No. 138 (28 February 1994)

Grand Slam doubles results
- US Open: 1R (1994)

David Nainkin (born 20 September 1970) is a former professional tennis player from South Africa.

== Career ==
Nainkin never reached a final on the ATP Tour but made it into the semi-finals of the 1995 Nokia Open in Beijing, before losing to Michael Chang.

He had the best win of his Grand Slam career at the 1996 US Open when he upset countryman and number nine seed Wayne Ferreira 6–4, 6–4, 2–6, 7–5 in the opening round. This was despite Nainkin being ranked 215 in the world and having never previously won a Grand Slam match in five attempts. He lost in straight sets to Jonas Björkman in the second round. In the 1998 US Open he made it into the third round, his best ever showing, with wins over fellow qualifier Mark Merklein (6–7, 6–0, 6–4, 6–4 ) and French Open winner Gustavo Kuerten (2–6, 6–4, 6–3, 6–4). He was then eliminated by eventual champion Patrick Rafter 6–1, 6–1, 6–1.

The South African represented his country at the 1998 and 1999 Davis Cups.

He now works for the United States Tennis Association and coaches top American players such as Mardy Fish, Sam Querrey and Sloane Stephens. Previously, he had been the personal coach of Wayne Ferreira.

In 2020 he was the head coach for the US Olympic Tennis Team.

== Challenger titles ==
=== Singles: (1) ===
No.	Date	Tournament	Surface	Opponent	Score
1.	1994	Seoul, South Korea	Hard	(United States) Michael Joyce	6–7, 6–3, 7–5

=== Doubles: (4) ===
No.	Date	Tournament	Surface	Partner	Opponents	Score
1.	1989	Johannesburg, South Africa	Grass	(South Africa) Lan Bale	(United Kingdom) Neil Broad (South Africa) Stefan Kruger	4–6, 6–4, 6–2
2.	1992	Perth, Australia	Hard	(South Africa) Lan Bale	(Australia) Andrew Florent (Australia) Andrew McLean	3–6, 7–6, 7–5
3.	1993	Rome, Italy	Clay	(South Africa) Grant Stafford	(Brazil) Danilo Marcelino (Brazil) Fernando Meligeni	6–0, 6–1
4.	1993	Jakarta, Indonesia	Hard	(South Africa) Lan Bale	(Germany) Mathias Huning (Malaysia) Adam Malik	6–7, 7–6, 7–6
