= James Sekulov =

Australian tennis player

- Country (sports): Australia
- Residence: Perth, Australia
- Born: 13 October 1976 (age 48); Perth, Western Australia
- Height: 183 cm (6 ft 0 in)
- Turned pro: Right-handed
- Plays: 1995
- Prize money: $244,696

Singles
- Career record: 6–16
- Career titles: 0
- Highest ranking: No. 123 (14 February 2000)

Grand Slam singles results
- Australian Open: 2R (2000)
- US Open: 1R (1998)

James Sekulov (born 13 October 1976) is a former professional tennis player from Australia.

== Career ==
Sekulov was a boys' doubles finalist at the 1993 US Open, partnering Ben Ellwood. He finished that year as the world's seventh-ranked junior singles player.

The right-handed Australian made his senior Grand Slam debut in the 1998 US Open and lost in the opening round to Davide Sanguinetti.

In 1999, Sekulov reached the semi-finals of the Mercedes-Benz Cup in Los Angeles. To make the semi-finals, where he was beaten by Pete Sampras, Sekulov managed wins over Czech Martin Damm, world number 18 Thomas Enqvist and former French Open champion Michael Chang.

He had a five-set win over Ivan Ljubicic at the 2000 Australian Open, in what would be his last Grand Slam appearance and only win. Later that year, Sekulov defeated Roger Federer, then ranked 40th in the world, at the Indianapolis Tennis Championships.
