= Miriam Schnitzer =

German tennis player

- Full name: Miriam Schnitzer
- Country (sports): Germany
- Born: 14 January 1977 (age 48); Freiburg, West Germany
- Plays: Right-handed
- Prize money: $185,452

Singles
- Career record: 163–154
- Career titles: 0 WTA, 4 ITF
- Highest ranking: No. 109 (14 June 1999)

Grand Slam singles results
- Wimbledon: 1R (1997, 1998, 2001)
- US Open: 2R (1998)

Doubles
- Career record: 13–26
- Highest ranking: No. 317 (11 September 2000)

Miriam Schnitzer (born 14 January 1977) is a former professional tennis player from Germany.

== Biography ==
Born in Freiburg, she is one of two children of Gaby and Walter Schnitzer. She was introduced to tennis by her father at the age of four.

Competing professionally from 1994, Schnitzer attained her best ranking of 109 in the world in 1999 and won four titles on the ITF circuit.

All of her five main draw appearances at grand slam level, including three at Wimbledon, came after getting through qualifying. She made the second round of the 1998 US Open, by beating Ukraine's Elena Tatarkova. In qualifying for the 2000 US Open she had wins over Daniela Hantuchova and Virginie Razzano.

Her best WTA Tour performance was a quarter-final appearance at the 2001 German Open in Berlin. Playing as a wildcard, she beat Francesca Schiavone, Nathalie Tauziat and Denisa Chladkova, before falling to Justine Henin. She had earned her wildcard into the draw after winning the German Indoor Championships.

She retired from professional tennis in 2002.

== ITF finals ==
=== Singles (4–5) ===
Legend
$25,000 tournaments
$10,000 tournaments

Result	No.	Date	Tournament	Surface	Opponent	Score
Loss	1.	18 April 1994	Nottingham, United Kingdom	Hard	(Australia) Shannon Peters	0–6, 0–6
Loss	2.	6 March 1995	Buchen, Germany	Carpet	(Germany) Kerstin Taube	2–6, 4–6
Loss	3.	24 July 1995	Istanbul, Turkey	Hard	(Switzerland) Emmanuelle Gagliardi	4–6, 6–7^{(8–10)}
Win	4.	16 February 1997	Rogaška Slatina, Slovenia	Carpet	(Russia) Ekaterina Sysoeva	7–6, 6–4
Win	5.	9 March 1997	Buchen, Germany	Carpet	(Czech Republic) Magdalena Zděnovcová	6–2, 4–6, 7–5
Loss	6.	8 March 1998	Buchen, Germany	Carpet (i)	(Russia) Elena Dementieva	1–6, 3–6
Loss	7.	13 February 2000	Ljubljana, Slovenia	Carpet (i)	(Slovenia) Tina Križan	2–6, 3–6
Win	8.	9 July, 2000	Vaihingen (Stuttgart), Germany	Clay	(Germany) Mia Buric	6–3, 6–4
Win	9.	16 July, 2000	Darmstadt, Germany	Clay	(Czech Republic) Renata Kučerová	6–4, 6–3

=== Doubles (0–1) ===
Result	No.	Date	Tournament	Surface	Partner	Opponents	Score
Loss	1.	15 February 1998	Rogaška Slatina, Slovenia	Hard (i)	(Slovenia) Tina Pisnik	(Slovenia) Tina Križan (Slovenia) Katarina Srebotnik	0–6, 3–6
