= Jean Okada =

American tennis player

- Full name: Jean Okada
- Country (sports): United States
- Born: 7 June 1974 (age 50)
- Prize money: $47,961

Singles
- Highest ranking: No. 204 (October 12, 1998)

Grand Slam singles results
- US Open: 1R (1998)

Doubles
- Highest ranking: No. 127 (November 2, 1998)

Jean Okada (born June 7, 1974) is a former professional tennis player from the United States.

== Biography ==
Okada grew up in Lahaina, on the Hawaiian island of Maui.

From 1992 to 1996 she played collegiate tennis at the University of California, Santa Barbara (UCSB). She has the distinction of being the first women's UCSB player to earn All-American honors, which she achieved in 1996 after reaching the round of 16 at the NCAA championships.

As a professional player her most notable performance was qualifying for the singles main draw of the 1998 US Open. One of her wins in qualifying was over former top 50 player Elena Makarova. In the main draw she was beaten in the first round by the Czech Republic's Radka Bobková.

She retired from the tour in 2001.
