= Bea Bielik =

American tennis player

- Country (sports): United States
- Residence: Valley Stream, NY, United States of America
- Born: November 28, 1980 (age 45) Budapest, Hungary
- Height: 1.83 m (6 ft 0 in)
- Turned pro: 2002
- Plays: Right-handed (one-handed backhand)
- College: Wake Forest (1999–02)
- Prize money: US $83,216

Singles
- Career record: 29-35
- Career titles: 0 (ITF)
- Highest ranking: 130 (August 25, 2003)

Grand Slam singles results
- Australian Open: -
- French Open: Q1 (2003)
- Wimbledon: 1R (2003)
- US Open: 3R (2002)

Doubles
- Career record: 5-10
- Career titles: 0 (ITF)
- Highest ranking: 302 (September 29, 2003)
- Last updated on: April 29, 2011.

Beatrix Bielik (born November 28, 1980), is an American former professional tennis player. Her highest WTA singles ranking is 130, which she reached on August 25, 2003. In 2002, she won the National Collegiate Athletic Association (NCAA) women's tennis singles championships representing Wake Forest University; subsequently Bielik was given a Wild Card into the Main Draw of the US Open. She entered the tournament ranked 1,102 in the world. In the first round she defeated world number 148 Renata Voráčová of the Czech Republic in straight sets, 6–4, 6–4, but the major upset came in the 2nd round, when she defeated comfortably Thailand's Tamarine Tanasugarn, who was a top 30 player at the time, 6–4, 6–2. She then lost in the 3rd round to world number 6 Justine Henin 7–5, 6–1. She was named the 2002 female ACC Athlete of the Year by the Atlantic Coast Conference. In 2003, she failed to qualify for the French Open, but qualified for Wimbledon's Main Draw, losing to Svetlana Kuznetsova in the first round. She also lost in the first round of the US Open, this time to Patty Schnyder. Bielik's main weapon was her powerful serve.

== College ==
While at Wake Forest, she won the Honda Sports Award as the nation's best female tennis player in 2002.
