= 1998 US Open – Girls' doubles =

Girls' doubles
- 1998 US Open

Final
- Champions: (Belgium) Kim Clijsters (Denmark) Eva Dyrberg
- Runners-up: (Australia) Jelena Dokić (Australia) Evie Dominikovic
- Score: 7–6, 6–4

Events
Singles	men	women		boys	girls
Doubles	men	women	mixed	boys	girls
WC Singles	men	women	quad
WC Doubles	men	women	quad
Legends	men	women	mixed
- US Open

Marissa Irvin and Alexandra Stevenson were the defending champions, but they did not compete this year.

Kim Clijsters and Eva Dyrberg won the title without losing a set, defeating Australians Jelena Dokić and Evie Dominikovic in the final.

== Draw ==
Key

- Q = Qualifier
- WC = Wild card
- LL = Lucky loser
- Alt = Alternate
- ITF = ITF entry
- PR = Protected ranking
- SR = Special ranking
- SE = Special exempt
- JE = Junior exempt
- JR = Junior Accelerator Programme entrant
- CO = College Accelerator Programme entrant
- NG = Next Gen Accelerator Program entrant
- w/o = Walkover
- r = Retired
- d = Defaulted

=== Finals ===
Semifinals
(Switzerland) Laura Bao (Switzerland) Caecilia Charbonnier	4	1
(Belgium) Kim Clijsters (Denmark) Eva Dyrberg	6	6
(Slovenia) Tina Hergold (Slovakia) Gabriela Voleková	4	7	4
(Australia) Jelena Dokić (Australia) Evie Dominikovic	6	5	6

Final
(Belgium) Kim Clijsters (Denmark) Eva Dyrberg	7	6
(Australia) Jelena Dokić (Australia) Evie Dominikovic	6	4

=== Top half ===
First round
(Switzerland) L Bao (Switzerland) C Charbonnier	6	2	6
(United Kingdom) H Collin (Argentina) E Krauth	4	6	4
(Slovakia) K Bašternáková (Slovakia) S Hrozenská	4	6	6
(Netherlands) M Gerards (Canada) M-È Pelletier	6	3	7
(India) U Khan (Slovakia) Z Kučová	0	0
(United States) J Rosen (Venezuela) M Sequera	6	6
(Belgium) K Clijsters (Denmark) E Dyrberg	6	6
(Hungary) M Horváth (Hungary) G Zsíros	1	1
(United States) B Braverman (United States) J Trail	5	4
(Slovenia) N Culum (Slovenia) T Pisnik	7	6
(Hungary) K Berecz (China) Li N	6	1	7
(Canada) K Krishnamurthy (Mexico) D Reynolds	2	6	5
(United States) J Bergman (United States) K Granson	2	2
(France) K Chevalier (Hungary) Z Gubacsi	6	6

Second round
(New Zealand) L Baker (New Zealand) R Hudson	2	6	6
(Switzerland) L Bao (Switzerland) C Charbonnier	6	4	7
(Netherlands) M Gerards (Canada) M-È Pelletier	4	4
(United States) J Rosen (Venezuela) M Sequera	6	6
(Belgium) K Clijsters (Denmark) E Dyrberg	6	6
(Slovenia) N Culum (Slovenia) T Pisnik	4	4
(Hungary) K Berecz (China) Li N	5	0
(France) K Chevalier (Hungary) Z Gubacsi	7	6

Quarterfinals
(Switzerland) L Bao (Switzerland) C Charbonnier	6	6
(United States) J Rosen (Venezuela) M Sequera	4	3
(Belgium) K Clijsters (Denmark) E Dyrberg	7	6
(France) K Chevalier (Hungary) Z Gubacsi	5	3

Semifinals
(Switzerland) L Bao (Switzerland) C Charbonnier	4	1
(Belgium) K Clijsters (Denmark) E Dyrberg	6	6

=== Bottom half ===
First round
(Slovenia) T Hergold (Slovakia) G Voleková	6	6
(Slovenia) M Matevžič (United States) K Tokuda	2	4
(United States) B Bielik (United States) L Granville	6	6
(Russia) L Krasnoroutskaya (Bosnia and Herzegovina) D Čaušević	3	4
(Czech Republic) D Bedáňová (Japan) R Fujiwara	6	6
(United States) A Cargill (United States) M Middleton	4	2
(United States) J Hopkins (United States) J Scaringe	1	3
(Argentina) C Fernández (Argentina) ME Salerni	6	6
(Australia) J Dokić (Australia) E Dominikovic	7	6
(Germany) J Schruff (Uzbekistan) I Tulyaganova	5	2
(United States) W Laiho (United States) J Lehnhoff	6	6
(United States) K McCain (United States) S Walker	1	3
(Germany) M Buric (Germany) L Steinbach	6	6
(Belarus) A Nikolaeva (Croatia) D Penić	2	2
(Slovakia) D Hantuchová (Mexico) L Sánchez	6	1	6
(Indonesia) W Prakusya (Indonesia) W Sawondari	1	6	4

Second round
(Slovenia) T Hergold (Slovakia) G Voleková	6	7
(United States) B Bielik (United States) L Granville	3	6
(Czech Republic) D Bedáňová (Japan) R Fujiwara	2	2
(Argentina) C Fernández (Argentina) ME Salerni	6	6
(Australia) J Dokić (Australia) E Dominikovic	6	6
(United States) W Laiho (United States) J Lehnhoff	2	2
(Germany) M Buric (Germany) L Steinbach	6	7
(Slovakia) D Hantuchová (Mexico) L Sánchez	1	6

Quarterfinals
(Slovenia) T Hergold (Slovakia) G Voleková	5	6	7
(Argentina) C Fernández (Argentina) ME Salerni	7	4	5
(Australia) J Dokić (Australia) E Dominikovic	3	6	6
(Germany) M Buric (Germany) L Steinbach	6	2	4

Semifinals
(Slovenia) T Hergold (Slovakia) G Voleková	4	7	4
(Australia) J Dokić (Australia) E Dominikovic	6	5	6
