= Mark Merklein =

Bahamian tennis player and coach (born 1972)

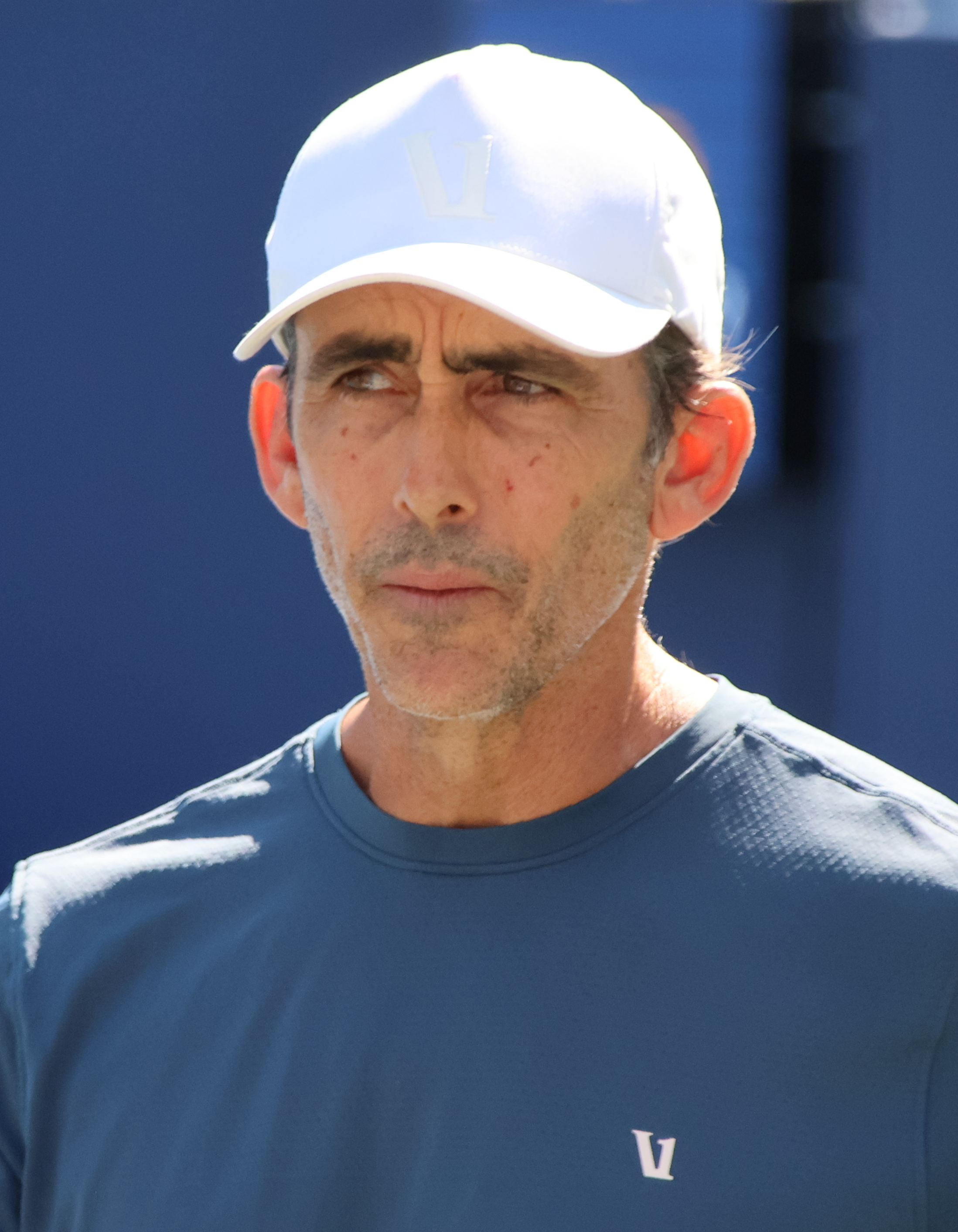
- Merklein in 2026
- Country (sports): Bahamas
- Residence: Gainesville, Florida, U.S.
- Born: June 28, 1972 (age 54) Freeport, Bahamas
- Height: 6 ft 2 in (1.88 m)
- Turned pro: 1994
- Retired: 2004
- Plays: Right-handed
- Prize money: US$ 502,870

Singles
- Career record: 10–21
- Career titles: 0
- Highest ranking: No. 160 (7 July 1997)

Grand Slam singles results
- US Open: 1R (1994, 1998)

Doubles
- Career record: 88–104
- Career titles: 4
- Highest ranking: No. 37 (12 January 2004)

Grand Slam doubles results
- Australian Open: 3R (2003)
- French Open: 2R (1998, 1999, 2005)
- Wimbledon: 2R (1999, 2002)
- US Open: 2R (1993, 1998)

Other doubles tournaments
- Olympic Games: QF (2000)

Mixed doubles
- Career record: 2–4
- Career titles: 0

Grand Slam mixed doubles results
- Australian Open: 1R (2004)
- Wimbledon: 3R (1999)

Team competitions
- Davis Cup: W/L (15–12)
- Last updated on: December 21, 2014.

Mark Merklein (born June 28, 1972) is a Bahamian former college and professional tennis player. He played for the Bahamas Davis Cup team from 1999 to 2004.

Merklein was born in Freeport, Bahamas. He grew up in Coral Springs, Florida, and attended St. Thomas Aquinas High School in nearby Fort Lauderdale. Playing for the St. Thomas Raiders high school tennis team, he won six Class 3A high school titles – two at No. 2 singles, one at No. 1 singles, and three at No. 1 doubles.

Merklein accepted an athletic scholarship to attend the University of Florida in Gainesville, Florida, where he played for the Florida Gators men's tennis team in National Collegiate Athletic Association (NCAA) and Southeastern Conference (SEC) competition from 1991 to 1994. As a Gator, he won the NCAA national championship doubles title with partner David Blair in 1993. The following year, Merklein won the NCAA national championship singles title in 1994 in dominating fashion, losing only one set. Merklein was a four-time All-American, a three-time All-SEC selection, and the SEC Player of the Year in 1994. He was inducted into the University of Florida Athletic Hall of Fame as a "Gator Great" in 2005.

Merklein turned professional in 1994, and won four doubles titles during his career. He won matches at all four Majors. On July 7, 1997, he reached his highest singles ranking of world No. 160, and reached his highest doubles ranking on January 12, 2004, when he became world No. 37.

On May 24, 2013, Merklein was hired as the University of Florida men's tennis assistant coach.

Merklein currently resides in Gainesville, Florida.

== Grand Slam tournament performance timelines ==
Key
W	F	SF	QF	#R	RR	Q#	DNQ	A	NH

(W) winner; (F) finalist; (SF) semifinalist; (QF) quarterfinalist; (#R) rounds 4, 3, 2, 1; (RR) round-robin stage; (Q#) qualification round; (DNQ) did not qualify; (A) absent; (NH) not held; (SR) strike rate (events won / competed); (W–L) win–loss record.

=== Singles ===
Tournament	1994	1995	1996	1997	1998
Australian Open	A	A	A	A	A
French Open	A	A	A	A	Q2
Wimbledon	A	A	A	A	Q3
US Open	1R	Q1	Q2	Q1	1R

=== Doubles ===
Tournament	1993	1994	1995	1996	1997	1998	1999	2000	2001	2002	2003	2004	2005
Australian Open	A	A	A	A	A	A	2R	1R	A	A	3R	1R	A
French Open	A	A	A	A	A	2R	2R	A	A	1R	1R	1R	2R
Wimbledon	A	A	A	A	A	1R	2R	A	1R	2R	1R	1R	Q2
US Open	2R	1R	1R	1R	1R	2R	A	Q2	1R	1R	1R	1R	A

== See also ==
- List of Florida Gators tennis players
- List of University of Florida Olympians
- List of University of Florida Athletic Hall of Fame members
