= 1998 US Open – Girls' singles =

Girls' singles
- 1998 US Open

Final
- Champion: (Australia) Jelena Dokic
- Runner-up: (Slovenia) Katarina Srebotnik
- Score: 6–4, 6–2

Events
Singles	men	women		boys	girls
Doubles	men	women	mixed	boys	girls
WC Singles	men	women	quad
WC Doubles	men	women	quad
Legends	men	women	mixed
- US Open

Cara Black was the defending champion, but did not compete this year.

Jelena Dokic won the title by defeating Katarina Srebotnik 6–4, 6–2 in the final.

== Seeds ==
1. (Slovenia) Katarina Srebotnik (final)
2. (Australia) Jelena Dokic (champion)
3. (Slovenia) Tina Pisnik (semifinals)
4. (Australia) Evie Dominikovic (semifinals)
5. (Argentina) Erica Krauth (first round)
6. (Russia) Nadia Petrova (quarterfinals)
7. (Indonesia) Wynne Prakusya (second round)
8. (United States) Jackie Trail (quarterfinals)
9. (Slovenia) Tina Hergold (second round)
10. (Argentina) Clarisa Fernández (second round)
11. (Venezuela) Milagros Sequera (first round)
12. (Belgium) Kim Clijsters (second round)
13. (Slovakia) Gabriela Voleková (third round)
14. (France) Kildine Chevalier (third round)
15. (n/a)
16. (Slovakia) Daniela Hantuchová (second round)

== Draws ==
Key

- Q = Qualifier
- WC = Wild card
- LL = Lucky loser
- Alt = Alternate
- ITF = ITF entry
- PR = Protected ranking
- SR = Special ranking
- SE = Special exempt
- JE = Junior exempt
- JR = Junior Accelerator Programme entrant
- CO = College Accelerator Programme entrant
- NG = Next Gen Accelerator Program entrant
- w/o = Walkover
- r = Retired
- d = Defaulted

=== Finals ===
Quarterfinals
1	(Slovenia) Katarina Srebotnik	6	6
8	(United States) Jackie Trail	0	2
4	(Australia) Evie Dominikovic	6	3	6
6	(Russia) Nadia Petrova	2	6	4
(Uzbekistan) Iroda Tulyaganova	2	2
3	(Slovenia) Tina Pisnik	6	6
(United States) Laura Granville	4	6^{7}
2	(Australia) Jelena Dokic	6	7^{9}

Semifinals
1	(Slovenia) Katarina Srebotnik	4	6	6
4	(Australia) Evie Dominikovic	6	3	2
3	(Slovenia) Tina Pisnik	3	1
2	(Australia) Jelena Dokic	6	6

Final
1	(Slovenia) Katarina Srebotnik	4	2
2	(Australia) Jelena Dokic	6	6

=== Top half ===
==== Section 1 ====
First round
1	(Slovenia) K Srebotnik	6	6
(Canada) Kavitha Krishnamurthy	2	0
(United States) J Hopkins	6	6
(United States) Janet Bergman	3	1
(Hungary) Z Gubacsi	7	6
(Switzerland) L Bao	6	1
(Croatia) Danira Penić	1	5
(Germany) M Buric	6	7
10	(Argentina) C Fernández	6	6
(United States) B Bielik	4	3
(Slovakia) K Bašternáková	6	6
(United States) Katie Granson	2	4
(United States) A Cargill	6	7
(India) Uzma Khan	0	5
(Denmark) E Dyrberg	6	4	3
8	(United States) J Trail	4	6	6

Second round
1	(Slovenia) K Srebotnik	6	6
(United States) J Hopkins	4	1
(Hungary) Z Gubacsi	3	2
(Germany) M Buric	6	6
10	(Argentina) C Fernández	6	4	5
(Slovakia) K Bašternáková	1	6	7
(United States) A Cargill	1	2^{r}
8	(United States) J Trail	6	4

Third round
1	(Slovenia) K Srebotnik	6	6
(Germany) M Buric	2	2
(Slovakia) K Bašternáková	6	4	1
8	(United States) J Trail	3	6	6

Quarterfinals
1	(Slovenia) K Srebotnik	6	6
8	(United States) J Trail	0	2

==== Section 2 ====
First round
4	(Australia) E Dominikovic	7	6
(Hungary) Kinga Berezc	6	4
(France) A Védy	4	6	7
(Slovakia) Z Kučová	6	4	5
(United States) Jacquelyn Rosen	5	6	6
(Japan) R Fujiwara	7	0	3
(United States) M Middleton	6	2
13	(Slovakia) G Voleková	7	6
11	(Venezuela) M Sequera	2	6
(Slovenia) Nives Ćulum	6	7
(New Zealand) R Hudson	2	5
(Netherlands) M Gerards	6	7
(United States) M Irvin	6	6
(Indonesia) W Sawondari	1	2
(United States) Julia Scaringe	3	6	1
6	(Russia) N Petrova	6	4	6

Second round
4	(Australia) E Dominikovic	7	7
(France) A Védy	6	6
(United States) J Rosen	3	3
13	(Slovakia) G Voleková	6	6
(Slovenia) N Ćulum	1	6	6
(Netherlands) M Gerards	6	2	2
(United States) M Irvin	6	1	5
6	(Russia) N Petrova	1	6	7

Third round
4	(Australia) E Dominikovic	6	6
13	(Slovakia) G Voleková	4	3
(Slovenia) N Ćulum	0	4
6	(Russia) N Petrova	6	6

Quarterfinals
4	(Australia) E Dominikovic	6	3	6
6	(Russia) N Petrova	2	6	4

=== Bottom half ===
==== Section 3 ====
First round
5	(Argentina) E Krauth	3	2
(Russia) L Krasnoroutskaya	6	6
(United Kingdom) H Collin	5	6	6
(New Zealand) L Baker	7	3	2
(United States) J Lehnhoff	4	6	4
(Uzbekistan) I Tulyaganova	6	2	6
(Bosnia and Herzegovina) Delila Causevic	7	2	1
12	(Belgium) K Clijsters	5	6	6
14	(France) K Chevalier	2	7	6
(Slovakia) S Hrozenská	6	5	0
(Slovenia) M Matevžič	4	6	6
(Hungary) Györgyi Zsíros	6	1	7
(United States) Brandis Braverman	6	6
(Croatia) D Krstulović	2	3
(Czech Republic) D Bedáňová	4	4
3	(Slovenia) T Pisnik	6	6

Second round
(Russia) L Krasnoroutskaya	4	6	6
(United Kingdom) H Collin	6	3	4
(Uzbekistan) I Tulyaganova	7	6
12	(Belgium) K Clijsters	5	1
14	(France) K Chevalier	6	6
(Hungary) G Zsíros	0	1
(United States) B Braverman	4	1
3	(Slovenia) T Pisnik	6	6

Third round
(Russia) L Krasnoroutskaya	1	6	4
(Uzbekistan) I Tulyaganova	6	2	6
14	(France) K Chevalier	6	4	3
3	(Slovenia) T Pisnik	2	6	6

Quarterfinals
(Uzbekistan) I Tulyaganova	2	2
3	(Slovenia) T Pisnik	6	6

==== Section 4 ====
First round
7	(Indonesia) W Prakusya	6	6
(Belarus) Alessia Nikolaeva	3	3
(Canada) MÈ Pelletier	0	3
(United States) Sara Walker	6	6
(Germany) L Steinbach	6	0
(United States) L Granville	7	6
(United States) K McCain	3	2
9	(Slovenia) T Hergold	6	6
16	(Slovakia) D Hantuchová	7	6
(China) N Li	5	4
(United States) W Laiho	6	6
(Hungary) Monika Horvath	1	2
(Argentina) ME Salerni	3	2
(Switzerland) C Charbonnier	6	6
(Mexico) Dominique Reynolds	2	0
2	(Australia) J Dokic	6	6

Second round
7	(Indonesia) W Prakusya	4	4
(United States) S Walker	6	6
(United States) L Granville	6	6
9	(Slovenia) T Hergold	2	4
16	(Slovakia) D Hantuchová	3	4
(United States) W Laiho	6	6
(Switzerland) C Charbonnier	4	0
2	(Australia) J Dokic	6	6

Third round
(United States) S Walker	2	3
(United States) L Granville	6	6
(United States) W Laiho	4	1
2	(Australia) J Dokic	6	6

Quarterfinals
(United States) L Granville	4	6
2	(Australia) J Dokic	6	7
