= Jackie Trail =

American tennis player

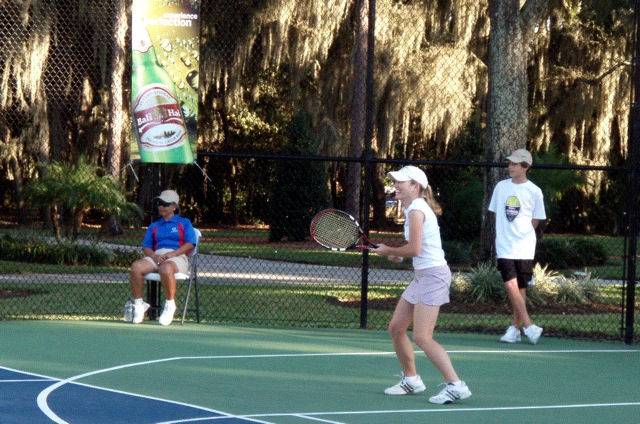
- Country (sports): United States
- Residence: Tampa, Florida, U.S.
- Born: Jacqueline Amanda Trail; November 26, 1980 (age 44); Paducah, Kentucky, U.S.
- Height: 5 ft 3 in (1.60 m)
- Turned pro: 1997
- Retired: 2003
- Plays: Right-handed (two-handed backhand)
- Prize money: $109,276

Singles
- Career record: 138–148
- Career titles: 3 ITF
- Highest ranking: No. 166 (March 1, 1999)

Grand Slam singles results
- Australian Open: Q2 (1999)
- US Open: 2R (1997, 1998)

Doubles
- Career record: 73–93
- Career titles: 0
- Highest ranking: No. 215 (November 4, 2002)

Jacqueline Trail Harang (born Jacqueline Amanda Trail, November 26, 1980) is a retired American tennis player. She had a prolific junior tennis career and played on the professional tour from 1997 to 2003. Trail retired due to injury in 2003.

== Junior career ==
Trail began playing tennis at the age of 4. At 7 years old, she won the first sanctioned United States Tennis Association (USTA) sanctioned tournament that she entered. In 1992, at the age of 12, Trail was ranked No. 1 in Kentucky in the Girls 12s, Girls 14s, Girls 16s, Girls 18s and Women's Open divisions. In 1993, Trail won the Kentucky State High School Tennis Championship as a 7th grader. She repeated the following year as an 8th grader.

Trail won seven national junior titles, second all-time only behind Tracy Austin when Trail turned professional at age 16. Her national junior titles are:

- 1997 Girls 18s Hardcourts (age 16)
- 1997 Girls 18s Claycourts (age 16)
- 1996 Girls 18s Indoors, singles and doubles (age 15)
- 1996 Girls 16s Hardcourts (age 15)
- 1995 Girls 16s Hardcourts (age 14)
- 1995 Girls 18s Indoors (age 14)

In 1996, Trail won the Girls 16s USTA National Sportsmanship Award. That year, Trail became the only player in history to win the USTA National Championships, USTA National Sportsmanship Award, and attain the No. 1 national ranking all in the same year.

In 1997, Trail was ranked No. 1 in the Girls 18s in the nation, ranked No. 6 in the ITF world junior rankings, represented the United States in the Connolly Continental Cup, was a member of the USTA's Team USA, and was the recipient of the Maureen Connolly Brinker Award. she advanced to the semifinals of Junior US Open, defeating Justine Henin in straights sets in the quarterfinals. Later that year, Trail signed with Octagon sports agency and turned professional.

== Professional career ==
Trail moved up the world rankings rapidly in 1997. She finished her rookie year on tour ranked No. 339 and advanced to the second round of the US Open. In 1998, she again advanced to the second round of the US Open, narrowly losing to Wimbledon champion Conchita Martínez. Trail finished the year ranked No. 198. By mid-1999, she had risen to No. 166 in the world. However, Trail suffered a foot injury near the end of the 1999 season. In 2000, she played on and off while she received medical attention to her foot injury. She finished the 2000 campaign ranked No. 339 in the world. Trail continued to play on tour the following few years through her increasing number of injuries. After winning her third career professional title in 2003, Trail retired from professional tennis.

=== ITF titles ===
2000 – ITF Easton (Maryland), United States
2001 – ITF Tallahassee (Florida), United States
2003 – ITF Waco (Texas), United States
