= 1998 US Open – Men's singles =

Men's singles
- 1998 US Open

Final
- Champion: (Australia) Patrick Rafter
- Runner-up: (Australia) Mark Philippoussis
- Score: 6–3, 3–6, 6–2, 6–0

Details
- Draw: 128
- Seeds: 16

Events
Singles	men	women		boys	girls
Doubles	men	women	mixed	boys	girls
WC Singles	men	women	quad
WC Doubles	men	women	quad
Legends	men	women	mixed
← 1997 ·	US Open	· 1999 →

Defending champion Patrick Rafter defeated Mark Philippoussis in the final, 6–3, 3–6, 6–2, 6–0 to win the men's singles tennis title at the 1998 US Open. It was his second and last major singles title.

== Seeds ==
1. (United States) Pete Sampras (semifinals)
2. (Chile) Marcelo Ríos (third round)
3. (Australia) Patrick Rafter (champion)
4. (Czech Republic) Petr Korda (first round)
5. (Netherlands) Richard Krajicek (third round)
6. (United Kingdom) Greg Rusedski (third round)
7. (Spain) Àlex Corretja (fourth round)
8. (United States) Andre Agassi (fourth round)
9. (Slovakia) Karol Kučera (quarterfinals)
10. (Spain) Carlos Moyà (semifinals)
11. (Russia) Yevgeny Kafelnikov (fourth round)
12. (Sweden) Jonas Björkman (quarterfinals)
13. (United Kingdom) Tim Henman (fourth round)
14. (Croatia) Goran Ivanišević (fourth round)
15. (Spain) Alberto Berasategui (first round)
16. (Spain) Albert Costa (first round)

== Draw ==
=== Key ===
- Q = Qualifier
- WC = Wild card
- LL = Lucky loser
- Alt = Alternate
- ITF = ITF entry
- PR = Protected ranking
- SR = Special ranking
- SE = Special exempt
- JE = Junior exempt
- JR = Junior Accelerator Programme entrant
- CO = College Accelerator Programme entrant
- NG = Next Gen Accelerator Program entrant
- w/o = Walkover
- r = Retired
- d = Defaulted

=== Finals ===
Quarterfinals
1	(United States) Pete Sampras	6	7	6
9	(Slovakia) Karol Kučera	3	5	4
3	(Australia) Patrick Rafter	6	6	7
12	(Sweden) Jonas Björkman	2	3	5
(Sweden) Thomas Johansson	6	3	7^{7}	3	6^{10}
(Australia) Mark Philippoussis	4	6	6^{3}	6	7^{12}
10	(Spain) Carlos Moyà	6	6	6
(Sweden) Magnus Larsson	4	3	3

Semifinals
1	(United States) Pete Sampras	7^{10}	4	6	4	3
3	(Australia) Patrick Rafter	6^{8}	6	2	6	6
(Australia) Mark Philippoussis	6	6	5	6
10	(Spain) Carlos Moyà	1	4	7	4

Final
3	(Australia) Patrick Rafter	6	3	6	6
(Australia) Mark Philippoussis	3	6	2	0

=== Top half ===
==== Section 1 ====
First round
1	(United States) P Sampras	6	6	6
(Germany) M-K Goellner	3	2	2
WC	(United States) P Goldstein	6^{7}	7^{7}	6	3
(Australia) A Ilie	7^{9}	6^{4}	4	0^{r}
WC	(United States) A Park	5	3	1
(Sweden) M Tillström	7	6	6
(Czech Republic) S Doseděl	6	3	6	6
(Belgium) F Dewulf	4	6	3	4
WC	(United States) T Dent	4	7	2
Q	(Germany) A Rădulescu	6	5	1^{r}
(Russia) M Safin	6	3	6	7^{7}
(Sweden) M Gustafsson	2	6	3	6^{4}
(United States) J Gimelstob	6	5	3^{r}
(Zimbabwe) W Black	3	7	2
(Austria) T Muster	7^{7}	6	6
15	(Spain) A Berasategui	6^{1}	2	3

Second round
1	(United States) P Sampras	7^{7}	2	6	6
WC	(United States) P Goldstein	6^{4}	6	3	3
(Sweden) M Tillström	1	6	7^{7}	3	6
(Czech Republic) S Doseděl	6	3	6^{5}	6	3
WC	(United States) T Dent	3	1	6^{2}
(Russia) M Safin	6	6	7^{7}
(Zimbabwe) W Black	7^{7}	4	3	0
(Austria) T Muster	6^{5}	6	6	6

Third round
1	(United States) P Sampras	6	6	6
(Sweden) M Tillström	2	3	1
(Russia) M Safin	6	6	1	6
(Austria) T Muster	4	4	6	3

Fourth round
1	(United States) P Sampras	6	6	6
(Russia) M Safin	4	3	2

==== Section 2 ====
First round
9	(Slovakia) K Kučera	6	6	6
(United States) S Campbell	4	2	4
(France) J Golmard	6	6	7^{7}
(Czech Republic) J Novák	3	4	6^{5}
WC	(United States) B Bryan	3	6^{5}	6	6	6
(South Africa) M Ondruska	6	7^{7}	1	4	4
(Romania) A Voinea	6	3	6	2
(Italy) A Gaudenzi	4	6	2	0^{r}
(Czech Republic) M Damm	6	6	7
(Netherlands) S Schalken	3	3	5
Q	(Australia) J Sekulov	4	4	2
(Italy) D Sanguinetti	6	6	6
(France) G Raoux	6	3	6	1	7^{8}
(France) N Escudé	3	6	3	6	6^{6}
(France) S Grosjean	4	1	4
8	(United States) A Agassi	6	6	6

Second round
9	(Slovakia) K Kučera	7	6	6
(France) J Golmard	5	3	0
WC	(United States) B Bryan	6	2	4	4
(Romania) A Voinea	0	6	6	6
(Czech Republic) M Damm	6^{6}	6^{5}	4
(Italy) D Sanguinetti	7^{8}	7^{7}	6
(France) G Raoux	3	2	7^{8}	6	1
8	(United States) A Agassi	6	6	6^{6}	3	6

Third round
9	(Slovakia) K Kučera	7	6	6
(Romania) A Voinea	5	3	2
(Italy) D Sanguinetti	2	3	0
8	(United States) A Agassi	6	6	6

Fourth round
9	(Slovakia) K Kučera	6	6	6^{5}	1	6
8	(United States) A Agassi	3	3	7^{7}	6	3

==== Section 3 ====
First round
3	(Australia) P Rafter	4	4	6	6	6
(Morocco) H Arazi	6	6	3	3	1
(Costa Rica) JA Marín	3	6	6	2	1
(Argentina) H Gumy	6	0	4	6	6
Q	(The Bahamas) M Merklein	7^{7}	0	4	4
Q	(South Africa) D Nainkin	6^{3}	6	6	6
Q	(Israel) N Behr	6	4	3	4
(Brazil) G Kuerten	4	6	6	6
(Spain) G Blanco	3	0	2
(Argentina) G Cañas	6	6	6
(Spain) J Alonso	4	3	2
(Netherlands) P Haarhuis	6	6	6
(United States) T Martin	7^{7}	6	7
(United States) J Tarango	6^{4}	2	5
(Australia) M Woodforde	3	4	4
14	(Croatia) G Ivanišević	6	6	6

Second round
3	(Australia) P Rafter	6	6	6
(Argentina) H Gumy	4	1	2
Q	(South Africa) D Nainkin	2	6	6	6
(Brazil) G Kuerten	6	4	3	4
(Argentina) G Cañas	1	1	5
(Netherlands) P Haarhuis	6	6	7
(United States) T Martin	6	6^{5}	5	3
14	(Croatia) G Ivanišević	1	7^{7}	7	6

Third round
3	(Australia) P Rafter	6	6	6
Q	(South Africa) D Nainkin	1	1	1
(Netherlands) P Haarhuis	6^{5}	3	4
14	(Croatia) G Ivanišević	7^{7}	6	6

Fourth round
3	(Australia) P Rafter	6	6	4	6
14	(Croatia) G Ivanišević	3	4	6	1

==== Section 4 ====
First round
12	(Sweden) J Björkman	6	4	6	6^{3}	6
(France) C Pioline	2	6	1	7^{7}	2
Q	(South Korea) Y-i Yoon	2	4	4
WC	(United States) J Stark	6	6	6
Q	(Australia) W Arthurs	6	5	6	6
(Spain) C Costa	3	7	4	4
(Ecuador) N Lapentti	6	5	3	6	6^{4}
(France) F Santoro	4	7	6	3	7^{7}
(Romania) D Pescariu	4	3	0
(Netherlands) J Siemerink	6	6	6
(Switzerland) M Rosset	6^{5}	6^{3}	5
(Slovakia) D Hrbatý	7^{7}	7^{7}	7
(Czech Republic) B Ulihrach	6	6	4	6
(Armenia) S Sargsian	1	3	6	4
(South Africa) W Ferreira	6	6^{2}	7	6^{7}	4
6	(United Kingdom) G Rusedski	4	7^{7}	5	7^{9}	6

Second round
12	(Sweden) J Björkman	6	6	6
WC	(United States) J Stark	2	3	1
Q	(Australia) W Arthurs	6^{3}	4	3
(France) F Santoro	7^{7}	6	6
(Netherlands) J Siemerink	6	6	6
(Slovakia) D Hrbatý	4	3	4
(Czech Republic) B Ulihrach	6	3	6	2	5
6	(United Kingdom) G Rusedski	4	6	4	6	7

Third round
12	(Sweden) J Björkman	6	6	6
(France) F Santoro	3	1	2
(Netherlands) J Siemerink	1	6	5	6	6
6	(United Kingdom) G Rusedski	6	4	7	2	4

Fourth round
12	(Sweden) J Björkman	6	2	6	6
(Netherlands) J Siemerink	4	6	2	2

=== Bottom half ===
==== Section 5 ====
First round
5	(Netherlands) R Krajicek	6	6	6
(France) A Clément	3	1	1
WC	(United States) A O'Brien	7	6	7^{9}
(India) L Paes	5	3	6^{7}
(Germany) H Dreekmann	6	1	6	6
(Australia) R Fromberg	3	6	3	3
(Sweden) T Johansson	7^{7}	6	7^{7}
(Brazil) F Meligeni	6^{5}	3	6^{3}
(Spain) F Clavet	6^{10}	6	7	6
(Romania) A Pavel	7^{12}	4	5	2
(Germany) N Kiefer	6	6	6
(France) L Roux	4	3	1
(Spain) J Burillo	3	5	4
(Germany) T Haas	6	7	6
(Netherlands) D van Scheppingen	1	2	4
11	(Russia) Y Kafelnikov	6	6	6

Second round
5	(Netherlands) R Krajicek	6	7^{7}	6
WC	(United States) A O'Brien	1	6^{5}	2
(Germany) H Dreekmann	6	5	2	3
(Sweden) T Johansson	2	7	6	6
(Spain) F Clavet	4	6^{3}	1
(Germany) N Kiefer	6	7^{7}	6
(Germany) T Haas	5	2	6	5
11	(Russia) Y Kafelnikov	7	6	1	7

Third round
5	(Netherlands) R Krajicek	7^{7}	4^{r}
(Sweden) T Johansson	6^{5}	5
(Germany) N Kiefer	4	0	2
11	(Russia) Y Kafelnikov	6	6	6

Fourth round
(Sweden) T Johansson	3	6	6	7^{8}
11	(Russia) Y Kafelnikov	6	3	3	6^{6}

==== Section 6 ====
First round
13	(United Kingdom) T Henman	6	7^{7}	7^{7}
(Australia) S Draper	3	6^{4}	6^{3}
(Spain) F Mantilla	6	3	6	7
(New Zealand) B Steven	3	6	4	5
(Australia) T Woodbridge	7^{7}	6^{0}	4^{r}
Q	(Germany) M Kohlmann	6^{5}	7^{7}	4
Q	(United States) D Wheaton	4	1	4
Q	(France) A Di Pasquale	6	6	6
(Norway) C Ruud	5	4	3
(Australia) M Philippoussis	7	6	6
(Canada) S Lareau	7	7^{7}	6
(Paraguay) R Delgado	5	6^{3}	3
(Denmark) K Carlsen	6^{0}	4	6	1
(Argentina) L Arnold Ker	7^{7}	6	4	6
Q	(Germany) B Karbacher	2	6	6	6
4	(Czech Republic) P Korda	6	3	2	1

Second round
13	(United Kingdom) T Henman	6	5	7	6
(Spain) F Mantilla	3	7	5	4
Q	(Germany) M Kohlmann	7	6	6
Q	(France) A Di Pasquale	5	4	4
(Australia) M Philippoussis	6^{3}	6	6	6
(Canada) S Lareau	7^{7}	3	3	4
(Argentina) L Arnold Ker	7	3	6	6
Q	(Germany) B Karbacher	5	6	2	3

Third round
13	(United Kingdom) T Henman	6	7	1	6
Q	(Germany) M Kohlmann	3	5	6	4
(Australia) M Philippoussis	7^{7}	6	6
(Argentina) L Arnold Ker	6^{5}	3	3

Fourth round
13	(United Kingdom) T Henman	5	6	4	1
(Australia) M Philippoussis	7	0	6	6

==== Section 7 ====
First round
7	(Spain) A Corretja	2	6	7	7
(Italy) G Pozzi	6	3	5	5
Q	(France) J-B Perlant	1	7	6	6
(Australia) J Stoltenberg	6	5	3	3
(United States) V Spadea	4	1	2
(Zimbabwe) B Black	6	6	6
(Germany) D Prinosil	4	3	6	4
(Spain) F Vicente	6	6	2	6
(Sweden) M Norman	7^{9}	6^{6}	6^{4}	6	6
(Canada) D Nestor	6^{7}	7^{8}	7^{7}	4	4
(United States) J-M Gambill	6	1	6	7
Q	(Germany) K Braasch	3	6	3	5
Q	(Israel) E Erlich	1	3	1
(United States) M Chang	6	6	6
(Argentina) M Puerta	1	6^{4}	7^{7}	4^{r}
10	(Spain) C Moyà	6	7^{7}	6^{3}	4

Second round
7	(Spain) A Corretja	6	5	6^{8}	6	6
Q	(France) J-B Perlant	4	7	7^{10}	1	0
(Zimbabwe) B Black	7^{7}	6	7
(Spain) F Vicente	6^{4}	1	5
(Sweden) M Norman	4	2	7^{10}	3
(United States) J-M Gambill	6	6	6^{8}	6
(United States) M Chang	6	6	6^{5}	4	3
10	(Spain) C Moyà	3	1	7^{7}	6	6

Third round
7	(Spain) A Corretja	6	4	6	7^{7}
(Zimbabwe) B Black	3	6	2	6^{5}
(United States) J-M Gambill	2	6	6	3	6^{4}
10	(Spain) C Moyà	6	3	3	6	7^{7}

Fourth round
7	(Spain) A Corretja	6^{4}	5	3
10	(Spain) C Moyà	7^{7}	7	6

==== Section 8 ====
First round
16	(Spain) A Costa	6	6	5	2	4
(Germany) O Gross	2	4	7	6	6
Q	(Argentina) M Rodríguez	1	2	2
(Spain) S Bruguera	6	6	6
(Ukraine) A Medvedev	6	7	6
(Netherlands) J van Lottum	4	5	2
(Spain) J Sánchez	2	5	6	3
WC	(United States) G Grant	6	7	4	6
(Sweden) M Larsson	3	6	1	6	6
(United States) M Washington	6	3	6	4	4
(Argentina) F Squillari	6^{5}	0	1
(Uruguay) M Filippini	7^{7}	6	6
(United States) M Russell	5	4	6	3
Q	(Italy) G Galimberti	7	6	3	6
(Czech Republic) D Vacek	4	2	3
2	(Chile) M Ríos	6	6	6

Second round
(Germany) O Gross	6	6	6
(Spain) S Bruguera	1	3	4
(Ukraine) A Medvedev	6	3	6^{4}	4
WC	(United States) G Grant	4	6	7^{7}	6
(Sweden) M Larsson	6	6	6
(Uruguay) M Filippini	3	2	2
Q	(Italy) G Galimberti	2	7^{7}	2	2
2	(Chile) M Ríos	6	6^{4}	6	6

Third round
(Germany) O Gross	7	6^{5}	5	6	7
WC	(United States) G Grant	5	7^{7}	7	3	5
(Sweden) M Larsson	6	6^{3}	2	6	6
2	(Chile) M Ríos	1	7^{7}	6	3	2

Fourth round
(Germany) O Gross	4	5	7	2
(Sweden) M Larsson	6	7	5	6

Preceded by 1998 Wimbledon Championships – Men's singles	Grand Slam men's singles	Succeeded by 1999 Australian Open – Men's singles
