= 1998 US Open – Mixed doubles =

Mixed doubles
- 1998 US Open

Final
- Champions: (United States) Serena Williams (Belarus) Max Mirnyi
- Runners-up: (United States) Lisa Raymond (United States) Patrick Galbraith
- Score: 6–2, 6–2

Details
- Draw: 32
- Seeds: 8

Events
Singles	men	women		boys	girls
Doubles	men	women	mixed	boys	girls
WC Singles	men	women	quad
WC Doubles	men	women	quad
Legends	men	women	mixed
- US Open

Serena Williams and Max Mirnyi defeated Lisa Raymond and Patrick Galbraith in the final, 6–2, 6–2 to win the mixed doubles tennis title at the 1998 US Open.

Manon Bollegraf and Rick Leach were the defending champions, but lost in the first round to Lindsay Davenport and Jan-Michael Gambill.

The Williams sisters, Venus and Serena, would sweep the grand slam mixed doubles titles in 1998. Venus and her partner, Justin Gimelstob, won the Australian Open and Roland Garros (beating Serena and Luis Lobo in the final), while Serena and her partner Max Mirnyi won Wimbledon and the US Open.

== Seeds ==
1. (Latvia) Larisa Neiland / (Australia) Mark Woodforde (second round)
2. (Australia) Rennae Stubbs / (United States) Jim Grabb (semifinals)
3. (United States) Lisa Raymond / (United States) Patrick Galbraith (final)
4. (Netherlands) Manon Bollegraf / (United States) Rick Leach (first round)
5. (Croatia) Mirjana Lučić / (India) Mahesh Bhupathi (quarterfinals)
6. (Argentina) Patricia Tarabini / (United States) Donald Johnson (quarterfinals)
7. (France) Alexandra Fusai / (South Africa) David Adams (first round)
8. (Australia) Kristine Kunce / (United States) Francisco Montana (second round)

== Draw ==
Key

- Q = Qualifier
- WC = Wild card
- LL = Lucky loser
- Alt = Alternate
- ITF = ITF entry
- PR = Protected ranking
- SR = Special ranking
- SE = Special exempt
- JE = Junior exempt
- JR = Junior Accelerator Programme entrant
- CO = College Accelerator Programme entrant
- NG = Next Gen Accelerator Program entrant
- w/o = Walkover
- r = Retired
- d = Defaulted

=== Finals ===
Semifinals
(United States) Debbie Graham (Australia) Sandon Stolle	7^{7}	6^{3}	2
WC	(United States) Serena Williams (Belarus) Max Mirnyi	6^{5}	7^{7}	6
3	(United States) Lisa Raymond (United States) Patrick Galbraith	6	6
2	(Australia) Rennae Stubbs (United States) Jim Grabb	3	4

Final
WC	(United States) Serena Williams (Belarus) Max Mirnyi	6	6
3	(United States) Lisa Raymond (United States) Patrick Galbraith	2	2

=== Top half ===
First round
1	(Latvia) L Neiland (Australia) M Woodforde	6	6
Alt	(Argentina) F Labat (Spain) T Carbonell	3	4
(Japan) R Hiraki (India) L Paes	6	4	4
(Australia) R McQuillan (Australia) D Macpherson	4	6	6
(United States) K Po (South Africa) R Koenig	6^{6}	3
(United States) D Graham (Australia) S Stolle	7^{8}	6
WC	(United States) C Morariu (United States) B MacPhie	6	6
7	(France) A Fusai (South Africa) D Adams	2	4
4	(Netherlands) M Bollegraf (United States) R Leach	6^{4}	1
WC	(United States) L Davenport (United States) J-M Gambill	7^{7}	6
(Netherlands) M Oremans (Sweden) N Kulti	1	3
WC	(United States) S Williams (Belarus) M Mirnyi	6	6
(Russia) E Likhovtseva (Netherlands) M Oosting	6	7^{7}
(United States) K Adams (Australia) A Florent	4	6^{3}
(Germany) A Huber (Australia) J Eagle	6	2	5
5	(Croatia) M Lučić (India) M Bhupathi	3	6	7

Second round
1	(Latvia) L Neiland (Australia) M Woodforde	3	2
(Australia) R McQuillan (Australia) D Macpherson	6	6
(United States) D Graham (Australia) S Stolle	6	6
WC	(United States) C Morariu (United States) B MacPhie	3	4
WC	(United States) L Davenport (United States) J-M Gambill
WC	(United States) S Williams (Belarus) M Mirnyi	w/o
(Russia) E Likhovtseva (Netherlands) M Oosting	3	3
5	(Croatia) M Lučić (India) M Bhupathi	6	6

Quarterfinals
(Australia) R McQuillan (Australia) D Macpherson	5	5
(United States) D Graham (Australia) S Stolle	7	7
WC	(United States) S Williams (Belarus) M Mirnyi	3	7	7
5	(Croatia) M Lučić (India) M Bhupathi	6	5	5

Semifinals
(United States) D Graham (Australia) S Stolle	7^{7}	6^{3}	2
WC	(United States) S Williams (Belarus) M Mirnyi	6^{5}	7^{7}	6

=== Bottom half ===
First round
6	(Argentina) P Tarabini (United States) D Johnson	5	6	6
(Croatia) I Majoli (Czech Republic) C Suk	7	1	4
(Japan) N Miyagi (Mexico) D Roditi	6	6
(Argentina) P Suárez (Argentina) D Orsanic	3	2
(Netherlands) C Vis (South Africa) J-L de Jager	6^{3}	6	6
(France) J Halard-Decugis (France) O Delaître	7^{7}	3	3
(Netherlands) K Boogert (The Bahamas) M Knowles	4	6	4
3	(United States) L Raymond (United States) P Galbraith	6	4	6
8	(Australia) K Kunce (United States) F Montana	6	7
(Ukraine) E Tatarkova (Canada) D Nestor	4	5
(Indonesia) Y Basuki (Netherlands) T Kempers	6	3	3
WC	(United States) V Williams (United States) J Gimelstob	2	6	6
(Belgium) D Van Roost (Czech Republic) D Rikl	6^{4}	7	4
(Australia) K-A Guse (Australia) A Kratzmann	7^{7}	5	6
(Slovakia) J Husárová (Czech Republic) M Damm	2	4
2	(Australia) R Stubbs (United States) J Grabb	6	6

Second round
6	(Argentina) P Tarabini (United States) D Johnson	7^{8}	6
(Japan) N Miyagi (Mexico) D Roditi	6^{6}	2
(Netherlands) C Vis (South Africa) J-L de Jager	3	6	6^{1}
3	(United States) L Raymond (United States) P Galbraith	6	4	7^{7}
8	(Australia) K Kunce (United States) F Montana	3	3
WC	(United States) V Williams (United States) J Gimelstob	6	6
(Australia) K-A Guse (Australia) A Kratzmann	2	5
2	(Australia) R Stubbs (United States) J Grabb	6	7

Quarterfinals
6	(Argentina) P Tarabini (United States) D Johnson	3	2
3	(United States) L Raymond (United States) P Galbraith	6	6
WC	(United States) V Williams (United States) J Gimelstob	2	6^{7}
2	(Australia) R Stubbs (United States) J Grabb	6	7^{9}

Semifinals
3	(United States) L Raymond (United States) P Galbraith	6	6
2	(Australia) R Stubbs (United States) J Grabb	3	4
