= 1998 US Open – Women's doubles =

Tennis tournament

Women's doubles
- 1998 US Open

Final
- Champions: (Switzerland) Martina Hingis (Czech Republic) Jana Novotná
- Runners-up: (United States) Lindsay Davenport (Belarus) Natasha Zvereva
- Score: 6–3, 6–3

Details
- Draw: 64 (4 Q / 4 WC )
- Seeds: 16

Events
Singles	men	women		boys	girls
Doubles	men	women	mixed	boys	girls
WC Singles	men	women	quad
WC Doubles	men	women	quad
Legends	men	women	mixed
← 1997 ·	US Open	· 1999 →

Defending champion Jana Novotná and her partner Martina Hingis defeated the other defending champion Lindsay Davenport and her partner Natasha Zvereva in the final, 6–3, 6–3 to win the women's doubles tennis title at the 1998 US Open. They did not drop a single set en route to the title. With the win, Hingis became the third woman in the Open Era to complete a Grand Slam in doubles, after Martina Navratilova and Pam Shriver. Additionally, Hingis and her partners defeated Davenport/Zvereva in all four major finals in 1998.

== Seeds ==
1. (Switzerland) Martina Hingis / (Czech Republic) Jana Novotná (champions)
2. (United States) Lindsay Davenport / (Belarus) Natasha Zvereva (final)
3. (France) Alexandra Fusai / (France) Nathalie Tauziat (second round)
4. (United States) Lisa Raymond / (Australia) Rennae Stubbs (semifinals)
5. (Indonesia) Yayuk Basuki / (Netherlands) Caroline Vis (second round)
6. (Russia) Anna Kournikova / (Latvia) Larisa Neiland (second round)
7. (Spain) Conchita Martínez / (Argentina) Patricia Tarabini (first round)
8. N/A
9. (United States) Katrina Adams / (Netherlands) Manon Bollegraf (second round)
10. (South Africa) Mariaan de Swardt / (United States) Debbie Graham (third round)
11. (Japan) Naoko Kijimuta / (Japan) Nana Miyagi (second round)
12. (France) Julie Halard-Decugis / (Australia) Rachel McQuillan (third round)
13. (Australia) Catherine Barclay / (Australia) Kerry-Anne Guse (second round)
14. (Austria) Barbara Schett / (Switzerland) Patty Schnyder (quarterfinals)
15. (Australia) Kristine Kunce / (United States) Corina Morariu (first round)
16. (Spain) Virginia Ruano Pascual / (Argentina) Paola Suárez (semifinals)

== Draw ==
=== Key ===
- Q = Qualifier
- WC = Wild card
- LL = Lucky loser
- Alt = Alternate
- ITF = ITF entry
- PR = Protected ranking
- SR = Special ranking
- SE = Special exempt
- JE = Junior exempt
- JR = Junior Accelerator Programme entrant
- CO = College Accelerator Programme entrant
- NG = Next Gen Accelerator Program entrant
- w/o = Walkover
- r = Retired
- d = Defaulted

=== Finals ===
Quarterfinals
1	(Switzerland) Martina Hingis (Czech Republic) Jana Novotná	6	6
14	(Austria) Barbara Schett (Switzerland) Patty Schnyder	3	4
4	(United States) Lisa Raymond (Australia) Rennae Stubbs	6	6
(United States) Amy Frazier (United States) Katie Schlukebir	3	4
(France) Caroline Dhenin (France) Émilie Loit	6^{4}	7^{7}	3
16	(Spain) Virginia Ruano Pascual (Argentina) Paola Suárez	7^{7}	6^{4}	6
(Japan) Miho Saeki (Japan) Yuka Yoshida	1	1
2	(United States) Lindsay Davenport (Belarus) Natasha Zvereva	6	6

Semifinals
1	(Switzerland) Martina Hingis (Czech Republic) Jana Novotná	6	6
4	(United States) Lisa Raymond (Australia) Rennae Stubbs	2	2
16	(Spain) Virginia Ruano Pascual (Argentina) Paola Suárez	2	4
2	(United States) Lindsay Davenport (Belarus) Natasha Zvereva	6	6

Final
1	(Switzerland) Martina Hingis (Czech Republic) Jana Novotná	6	6
2	(United States) Lindsay Davenport (Belarus) Natasha Zvereva	3	3

=== Top half ===
==== Section 1 ====
First round
1	(Switzerland) M Hingis (Czech Republic) J Novotná	6	6
(Bulgaria) P Stoyanova (Germany) E Wagner	4	2
(South Africa) E de Villiers (Australia) L McShea	2	2
(Slovakia) K Habšudová (Thailand) T Tanasugarn	6	6
(Argentina) F Labat (Belgium) D Van Roost	6	6
Q	(Zimbabwe) C Black (Kazakhstan) I Selyutina	3	4
(Bulgaria) S Krivencheva (Czech Republic) E Melicharová	1	1
12	(France) J Halard-Decugis (Australia) R McQuillan	6	6
14	(Austria) B Schett (Switzerland) P Schnyder	6	4	6
(Netherlands) K Boogert (Belgium) E Callens	3	6	4
(Japan) R Hiraki (United States) G Helgeson-Nielsen	6	4	4
(Germany) C Singer (Czech Republic) H Vildová	4	6	6
(United States) S Cacic (France) M Pierce	6	3	2
(Ukraine) O Lugina (Ukraine) E Tatarkova	4	6	6
(United States) C Rubin (Romania) I Spîrlea	6	6
LL	(United Kingdom) J Pullin (United Kingdom) L Woodroffe	0	2

Second round
1	(Switzerland) M Hingis (Czech Republic) J Novotná	7^{7}	6
(Slovakia) K Habšudová (Thailand) T Tanasugarn	6^{0}	0
(Argentina) F Labat (Belgium) D Van Roost	7	4	7
12	(France) J Halard-Decugis (Australia) R McQuillan	5	6	5
14	(Austria) B Schett (Switzerland) P Schnyder	6	7
(Germany) C Singer (Czech Republic) H Vildová	1	5
(Ukraine) O Lugina (Ukraine) E Tatarkova	2	6	2
(United States) C Rubin (Romania) I Spîrlea	6	3	6

Third round
1	(Switzerland) M Hingis (Czech Republic) J Novotná	6	6
12	(France) J Halard-Decugis (Australia) R McQuillan	1	0
14	(Austria) B Schett (Switzerland) P Schnyder	7^{7}	7^{7}
(United States) C Rubin (Romania) I Spîrlea	6^{5}	6^{2}

Quarterfinals
1	(Switzerland) M Hingis (Czech Republic) J Novotná	6	6
14	(Austria) B Schett (Switzerland) P Schnyder	3	4

==== Section 2 ====
First round
4	(United States) L Raymond (Australia) R Stubbs	6	6
Q	(Czech Republic) L Cenková (Russia) E Kulikovskaya	4	3
(Canada) S Jeyaseelan (Canada) R Simpson	3	7^{7}	6
(Croatia) M Lučić (United States) M Seles	6	6^{5}	2
(Sweden) Å Carlsson (Germany) B Rittner	5	5
(Germany) M Babel (Argentina) M Paz	7	7
(South Korea) Cho Y-j (South Korea) Park S-h	6^{4}	2
10	(South Africa) M de Swardt (United States) D Graham	7^{7}	6
15	(Australia) K Kunce (United States) C Morariu	6	6^{3}	4
Q	(United States) L Osterloh (United States) M Washington	2	7^{7}	6
WC	(United States) J Capriati (United States) A Stevenson	1	7	2
(Hungary) V Csurgó (South Korea) Kim E-h	6	5	6
(Belarus) O Barabanschikova (France) A Dechaume-Balleret	1	2
(United States) A Frazier (United States) K Schlukebir	6	6
WC	(United States) J Craybas (United States) T Snyder	3	2
6	(Russia) A Kournikova (Latvia) L Neiland	6	6

Second round
4	(United States) L Raymond (Australia) R Stubbs	6	6
(Canada) S Jeyaseelan (Canada) R Simpson	3	4
(Germany) M Babel (Argentina) M Paz	1	2
10	(South Africa) M de Swardt (United States) D Graham	6	6
Q	(United States) L Osterloh (United States) M Washington	6	6
(Hungary) V Csurgó (South Korea) Kim E-h	0	1
(United States) A Frazier (United States) K Schlukebir	6	4	6
6	(Russia) A Kournikova (Latvia) L Neiland	2	6	3

Third round
4	(United States) L Raymond (Australia) R Stubbs	6	6
10	(South Africa) M de Swardt (United States) D Graham	1	4
Q	(United States) L Osterloh (United States) M Washington	4	2
(United States) A Frazier (United States) K Schlukebir	6	6

Quarterfinals
4	(United States) L Raymond (Australia) R Stubbs	6	6
(United States) A Frazier (United States) K Schlukebir	3	4

=== Bottom half ===
==== Section 3 ====
First round
7	(Spain) C Martínez (Argentina) P Tarabini	6	4	2
(Chinese Taipei) J Lee (Chinese Taipei) Wang S-t	4	6	6
(Australia) A Ellwood (Australia) T Musgrave	2	2
(Belgium) L Courtois (Croatia) M Murić	6	6
WC	(United States) A Bradshaw (United States) A Spears	6^{4}	6	4
(France) C Dhenin (France) É Loit	7^{7}	4	6
(South Africa) A Coetzer (Germany) A Huber	2	5
11	(Japan) N Kijimuta (Japan) N Miyagi	6	7
16	(Spain) V Ruano Pascual (Argentina) P Suárez	6	6
(Germany) K Freye (France) N van Lottum	1	3
(Slovakia) J Husárová (Slovakia) H Nagyová	6^{12}	4
(Netherlands) S Noorlander (Australia) L Pleming	7^{14}	6
(Austria) K Kschwendt (France) A-G Sidot	6	6
(Romania) C Cristea (Poland) M Grzybowska	4	3
Q	(Canada) M Drake (United States) L Lee	4	3
3	(France) A Fusai (France) N Tauziat	6	6

Second round
(Chinese Taipei) J Lee (Chinese Taipei) Wang S-t	4	4
(Belgium) L Courtois (Croatia) M Murić	6	6
(France) C Dhenin (France) É Loit	4	6	6
11	(Japan) N Kijimuta (Japan) N Miyagi	6	4	3
16	(Spain) V Ruano Pascual (Argentina) P Suárez	6	6
(Netherlands) S Noorlander (Australia) L Pleming	1	4
(Austria) K Kschwendt (France) A-G Sidot	6	7
3	(France) A Fusai (France) N Tauziat	1	5

Third round
(Belgium) L Courtois (Croatia) M Murić	5	4
(France) C Dhenin (France) É Loit	7	6
16	(Spain) V Ruano Pascual (Argentina) P Suárez	6	6
(Austria) K Kschwendt (France) A-G Sidot	4	2

Quarterfinals
(France) C Dhenin (France) É Loit	6^{4}	7^{7}	3
16	(Spain) V Ruano Pascual (Argentina) P Suárez	7^{7}	6^{4}	6

==== Section 4 ====
First round
5	(Indonesia) Y Basuki (Netherlands) C Vis	6	6
(Czech Republic) R Bobková (Germany) C Schneider	4	4
(Japan) M Saeki (Japan) Y Yoshida	7^{7}	6
(Italy) L Golarsa (South Africa) L Horn	6^{3}	4
(Romania) R Dragomir (Croatia) I Majoli	7	6
(Italy) S Farina (Argentina) L Montalvo	5	4
(Italy) R Grande (France) S Testud	1	6	2
9	(United States) K Adams (Netherlands) M Bollegraf	6	2	6
13	(Australia) C Barclay (Australia) K-A Guse	3	6	6
(United States) L McNeil (United States) K Po	6	4	3
WC	(United States) A Augustus (Australia) A Jensen	2	2
(United States) MJ Fernandez (Spain) A Sánchez Vicario	6	6
(United States) E deLone (Australia) N Pratt	2	6	6
(Slovenia) T Križan (Slovenia) K Srebotnik	6	3	3
(Argentina) I Gorrochategui (Netherlands) M Oremans	3	1
2	(United States) L Davenport (Belarus) N Zvereva	6	6

Second round
5	(Indonesia) Y Basuki (Netherlands) C Vis	6	5	4
(Japan) M Saeki (Japan) Y Yoshida	4	7	6
(Romania) R Dragomir (Croatia) I Majoli	6	1	6
9	(United States) K Adams (Netherlands) M Bollegraf	3	6	1
13	(Australia) C Barclay (Australia) K-A Guse	3	1
(United States) MJ Fernandez (Spain) A Sánchez Vicario	6	6
(United States) E deLone (Australia) N Pratt	3	3
2	(United States) L Davenport (Belarus) N Zvereva	6	6

Third round
(Japan) M Saeki (Japan) Y Yoshida	7^{7}	3	7^{8}
(Romania) R Dragomir (Croatia) I Majoli	6^{1}	6	6^{6}
(United States) MJ Fernandez (Spain) A Sánchez Vicario	4	3
2	(United States) L Davenport (Belarus) N Zvereva	6	6

Quarterfinals
(Japan) M Saeki (Japan) Y Yoshida	1	1
2	(United States) L Davenport (Belarus) N Zvereva	6	6
