= 1998 US Open – Men's doubles =

Men's doubles
- 1998 US Open

Final
- Champion: (Australia) Sandon Stolle (Czech Republic) Cyril Suk
- Runner-up: (The Bahamas) Mark Knowles (Canada) Daniel Nestor
- Score: 4–6, 7–6, 6–2

Details
- Draw: 64
- Seeds: 16

Events
Singles	men	women		boys	girls
Doubles	men	women	mixed	boys	girls
WC Singles	men	women	quad
WC Doubles	men	women	quad
Legends	men	women	mixed
← 1997 ·	US Open	· 1999 →

The 1998 US Open was a tennis tournament played on outdoor hard courts at the USTA National Tennis Center in New York City in New York in the United States. It was the 118th edition of the US Open and was held from August 31 through September 13, 1998.

== Seeds ==
Champion seeds are indicated in bold text while text in italics indicates the round in which those seeds were eliminated.

1. (Netherlands) Jacco Eltingh / (Netherlands) Paul Haarhuis (withdrew)
2. (Australia) Todd Woodbridge / (Australia) Mark Woodforde (third round)
3. (Sweden) Jonas Björkman / (Australia) Patrick Rafter (quarterfinals)
4. (India) Mahesh Bhupathi / (India) Leander Paes (semifinals)
5. (South Africa) Ellis Ferreira / (United States) Rick Leach (first round)
6. (The Bahamas) Mark Knowles / (Canada) Daniel Nestor (final)
7. Unknown (withdrew)
8. (Russia) Yevgeny Kafelnikov / (Czech Republic) Daniel Vacek (second round)
9. (United States) Patrick Galbraith / (New Zealand) Brett Steven (first round)
10. (United States) Donald Johnson / (United States) Francisco Montana (first round)
11. (Australia) Joshua Eagle / (Australia) Andrew Florent (first round)
12. (Zimbabwe) Wayne Black / (Canada) Sébastien Lareau (first round)
13. (Czech Republic) Jiří Novák / (Czech Republic) David Rikl (second round)
14. (South Africa) David Adams / (France) Olivier Delaître (third round)
15. (Australia) **Sandon Stolle** / (Czech Republic) **Cyril Suk (champions)**
16. (United Kingdom) Neil Broad / (South Africa) Piet Norval (quarterfinals)

== Draw ==
=== Key ===
- Q = Qualifier
- WC = Wild card
- LL = Lucky loser
- Alt = Alternate
- ITF = ITF entry
- PR = Protected ranking
- SR = Special ranking
- SE = Special exempt
- JE = Junior exempt
- JR = Junior Accelerator Programme entrant
- CO = College Accelerator Programme entrant
- NG = Next Gen Accelerator Program entrant
- w/o = Walkover
- r = Retired
- d = Defaulted

=== Finals ===
Quarterfinals
16	(United Kingdom) Neil Broad (South Africa) Piet Norval	**7**	4	2
(South Africa) **John-Laffnie de Jager** **(South Africa) Robbie Koenig**	5	**6**	**6**
3	(Sweden) Jonas Björkman (Australia) Patrick Rafter	**7**	2	4
6	(The Bahamas) **Mark Knowles** **(Canada) Daniel Nestor**	5	**6**	**6**
(Argentina) Luis Lobo (Spain) Javier Sánchez	3	3
4	(India) **Mahesh Bhupathi** **(India) Leander Paes**	**6**	**6**
(Czech Republic) Martin Damm (United States) Jim Grabb	6	**7**	5
15	(Australia) **Sandon Stolle** **(Czech Republic) Cyril Suk**	**7**	6	**7**

Semifinals
(South Africa) John-Laffnie de Jager (South Africa) Robbie Koenig	6	2
6	(The Bahamas) **Mark Knowles** **(Canada) Daniel Nestor**	**7**	**6**
4	(India) Mahesh Bhupathi (India) Leander Paes	3	6
15	(Australia) **Sandon Stolle** **(Czech Republic) Cyril Suk**	**6**	**7**

Final
6	(The Bahamas) Mark Knowles (Canada) Daniel Nestor	**6**	6	2
15	(Australia) **Sandon Stolle** **(Czech Republic) Cyril Suk**	4	**7**	**6**

=== Top half ===
==== Section 1 ====
First round
(United States) **B Coupe** **(United States) D Randall**	4	**6**	**6**
LL	(Argentina) M Rodríguez (Brazil) A Sá	**6**	4	3
(Australia) **D Macpherson** **(United States) D Wheaton**	**6**	**6**
WC	(United States) P Goldstein (United States) G Grant	1	3
Q	(Germany) **M Kohlmann** **(Venezuela) M Ruah**	**6**	**7**
(Hungary) G Köves (United States) J Tarango	4	5
16	(United Kingdom) **N Broad** **(South Africa) P Norval**	**6**	**7**
(Argentina) D del Río (Socialist Federal Republic of Yugoslavia) N Djordjevic	4	6
(Argentina) **L Arnold** **(Mexico) D Roditi**	**6**	0	**6**
10	(United States) D Johnson (United States) F Montana	4	**6**	4
(South Africa) **J-L de Jager** **(South Africa) R Koenig**	**7**	**7**
(Germany) M-K Goellner (Germany) D Prinosil	6	6
(Sweden) **N Kulti** **(Sweden) M Tillström**	4	**6**	**7**
(United States) T Martin (United States) R Reneberg	**6**	2	5
8	(Russia) **Y Kafelnikov** **(Czech Republic) D Vacek**	4	**6**	**6**
(France) J Golmard (France) F Santoro	**6**	3	3

Second round
(United States) **B Coupe** **(United States) D Randall**	**6**	**6**
(Australia) D Macpherson (United States) D Wheaton	3	4
Q	(Germany) M Kohlmann (Venezuela) M Ruah	6	**6**	3
16	(United Kingdom) **N Broad** **(South Africa) P Norval**	**7**	4	**6**
(Argentina) L Arnold (Mexico) D Roditi	5	3
(South Africa) **J-L de Jager** **(South Africa) R Koenig**	**7**	**6**
(Sweden) **N Kulti** **(Sweden) M Tillström**	**6**	**6**
8	(Russia) Y Kafelnikov (Czech Republic) D Vacek	4	4

Third round
(United States) B Coupe (United States) D Randall	4	4
16	(United Kingdom) **N Broad** **(South Africa) P Norval**	**6**	**6**
(South Africa) **J-L de Jager** **(South Africa) R Koenig**	**7**	**6**
(Sweden) N Kulti (Sweden) M Tillström	6	3

Quarterfinals
16	(United Kingdom) N Broad (South Africa) P Norval	**7**	4	2
(South Africa) **J-L de Jager** **(South Africa) R Koenig**	5	**6**	**6**

==== Section 2 ====
First round
3	(Sweden) **J Björkman** **(Australia) P Rafter**	**6**	**7**
(South Africa) W Ferreira (Croatia) G Ivanišević	4	6
WC	(United States) **B MacPhie** **(United States) P McEnroe**	**6**	**6**
(United States) D Flach (United States) M Keil	2	1
(United States) **D Bowen** **(Czech Republic) T Anzari**	**6**	**6**
WC	(United States) KJ Hippensteel (United States) D Martin	2	2
14	(South Africa) **D Adams** **(France) O Delaître**	**6**	5	**7**
WC	(United States) B Bryan (United States) M Bryan	1	**7**	6
(South Africa) **G Stafford** **(Zimbabwe) K Ullyett**	3	**6**	**6**
11	(Australia) J Eagle (Australia) A Florent	**6**	3	4
(Sweden) **F Bergh** **(Sweden) P Nyborg**	**6**	6	**6**
(Argentina) M Hood (Argentina) S Prieto	3	**7**	3
(United States) **J Gimelstob** **(United States) J Stark**	**7**	**7**
Q	(United States) S Humphries (United States) J Palmer	6	6
6	(The Bahamas) **M Knowles** **(Canada) D Nestor**	3	**6**	**7**
Q	(Australia) G Silcock (South Africa) M Wakefield	**6**	2	6

Second round
3	(Sweden) **J Björkman** **(Australia) P Rafter**	**7**	4	**6**
WC	(United States) B MacPhie (United States) P McEnroe	5	**6**	3
(United States) D Bowen (Czech Republic) T Anzari	3	2
14	(South Africa) **D Adams** **(France) O Delaître**	**6**	**6**
(South Africa) G Stafford (Zimbabwe) K Ullyett	3	5
(Sweden) **F Bergh** **(Sweden) P Nyborg**	**6**	**7**
(United States) J Gimelstob (United States) J Stark	1	6
6	(The Bahamas) **M Knowles** **(Canada) D Nestor**	**6**	**7**

Third round
3	(Sweden) **J Björkman** **(Australia) P Rafter**	**6**	**6**
14	(South Africa) D Adams (France) O Delaître	3	3
(Sweden) F Bergh (Sweden) P Nyborg	3	0
6	(The Bahamas) **M Knowles** **(Canada) D Nestor**	**6**	**6**

Quarterfinals
3	(Sweden) J Björkman (Australia) P Rafter	**7**	2	4
6	(The Bahamas) **M Knowles** **(Canada) D Nestor**	5	**6**	**6**

=== Bottom half ===
==== Section 3 ====
First round
(Argentina) **L Lobo** **(Spain) J Sánchez**	**6**	**6**
5	(South Africa) E Ferreira (United States) R Leach	2	4
(Spain) **T Carbonell** **(Spain) F Roig**	6	**6**	**6**
(Netherlands) T Kempers (Netherlands) M Oosting	**7**	4	4
(South Africa) **B Haygarth** **(United States) K Kinnear**	4	**6**	**7**
(Argentina) D Orsanic (Netherlands) J Siemerink	**6**	4	6
(Zimbabwe) **B Black** **(United States) A O'Brien**	**6**	**6**
12	(Zimbabwe) W Black (Canada) S Lareau	2	3
13	(Czech Republic) **J Novák** **(Czech Republic) D Rikl**	**7**	**6**
(Argentina) P Albano (Ecuador) N Lapentti	6	4
Q	(South Africa) **L Bale** **(United Kingdom) D Sapsford**	**6**	**6**
(Netherlands) S Noteboom (Netherlands) F Wibier	3	2
(Germany) **K Braasch** **(South Africa) M Ondruska**	**7**	**6**
(Belgium) L Pimek (South Africa) B Talbot	6	3
4	(India) **M Bhupathi** **(India) L Paes**	**7**	**7**
(Brazil) F Meligeni (Argentina) M Puerta	5	6

Second round
(Argentina) **L Lobo** **(Spain) J Sánchez**	**6**	**6**
(Spain) T Carbonell (Spain) F Roig	4	4
(South Africa) B Haygarth (United States) K Kinnear	3	2
(Zimbabwe) **B Black** **(United States) A O'Brien**	**6**	**6**
13	(Czech Republic) J Novák (Czech Republic) D Rikl	4	3
Q	(South Africa) **L Bale** **(United Kingdom) D Sapsford**	**6**	**6**
(Germany) K Braasch (South Africa) M Ondruska	2	4
4	(India) **M Bhupathi** **(India) L Paes**	**6**	**6**

Third round
(Argentina) **L Lobo** **(Spain) J Sánchez**	**6**	2	**6**
(Zimbabwe) B Black (United States) A O'Brien	4	**6**	4
Q	(South Africa) L Bale (United Kingdom) D Sapsford	0	2
4	(India) **M Bhupathi** **(India) L Paes**	**6**	**6**

Quarterfinals
(Argentina) L Lobo (Spain) J Sánchez	3	3
4	(India) **M Bhupathi** **(India) L Paes**	**6**	**6**

==== Section 4 ====
First round
(Czech Republic) **M Damm** **(United States) J Grabb**	5	**7**	**6**
(Australia) W Arthurs (Australia) P Tramacchi	**7**	6	3
WC	(The Bahamas) **M Merklein** **(United States) V Spadea**	**6**	**6**
WC	(United States) T Dent (United States) M Russell	4	4
WC	(United States) **L Jensen** **(United States) M Jensen**	**6**	**6**
(Belarus) M Mirnyi (Czech Republic) P Vízner	4	4
(South Africa) **M Barnard** **(Russia) A Olhovskiy**	**6**	**6**
9	(United States) P Galbraith (New Zealand) B Steven	4	4
15	(Australia) **S Stolle** **(Czech Republic) C Suk**	**6**	**6**
(Australia) A Kratzmann (Australia) M Tebbutt	4	4
(South Africa) **C Haggard** **(United States) J Waite**	**7**	**6**
(North Macedonia) A Kitinov (South Africa) P Rosner	6	4
(United States) **D DiLucia** **(United States) M Sell**	**6**	**6**
(Spain) J Alonso (Spain) JA Conde	2	1
2	(Australia) **T Woodbridge** **(Australia) M Woodforde**	**6**	3	**6**
(South Africa) N Godwin (Finland) T Ketola	3	**6**	3

Second round
(Czech Republic) **M Damm** **(United States) J Grabb**	**7**	**6**
WC	(The Bahamas) M Merklein (United States) V Spadea	6	0
WC	(United States) **L Jensen** **(United States) M Jensen**	**6**	**6**
(South Africa) M Barnard (Russia) A Olhovskiy	4	3
15	(Australia) **S Stolle** **(Czech Republic) C Suk**	**7**	**6**
(South Africa) C Haggard (United States) J Waite	6	4
(United States) D DiLucia (United States) M Sell	3	5
2	(Australia) **T Woodbridge** **(Australia) M Woodforde**	**6**	**7**

Third round
(Czech Republic) **M Damm** **(United States) J Grabb**	**6**	4	**6**
WC	(United States) L Jensen (United States) M Jensen	4	**6**	2
15	(Australia) **S Stolle** **(Czech Republic) C Suk**	3	**6**	**7**
2	(Australia) T Woodbridge (Australia) M Woodforde	**6**	3	5

Quarterfinals
(Czech Republic) M Damm (United States) J Grabb	6	**7**	5
15	(Australia) **S Stolle** **(Czech Republic) C Suk**	**7**	6	**7**
