= 1998 US Open – Women's singles =

Women's singles
- 1998 US Open

Final
- Champion: (United States) Lindsay Davenport
- Runner-up: (Switzerland) Martina Hingis
- Score: 6–3, 7–5

Details
- Draw: 128
- Seeds: 16

Events
Singles	men	women		boys	girls
Doubles	men	women	mixed	boys	girls
WC Singles	men	women	quad
WC Doubles	men	women	quad
Legends	men	women	mixed
← 1997 ·	US Open	· 1999 →

Lindsay Davenport defeated defending champion Martina Hingis in the final, 6–3, 7–5 to win the women's singles tennis title at the 1998 US Open. It was her first major singles title. Davenport did not lose a set during the tournament. The final was a rematch of the previous year's semifinal.

This marked the final US Open appearance of former world No. 1 and five-time champion Steffi Graf; she lost to Patty Schnyder in the fourth round. It was also the first US Open appearance for future world No. 1 and six-time champion Serena Williams; she was defeated by Irina Spîrlea in the third round.

== Seeds ==
1. (Switzerland) Martina Hingis (final)
2. (United States) Lindsay Davenport (champion)
3. (Czech Republic) Jana Novotná (semifinals)
4. (Spain) Arantxa Sánchez Vicario (quarterfinals)
5. (United States) Venus Williams (semifinals)
6. (United States) Monica Seles (quarterfinals)
7. (Spain) Conchita Martínez (fourth round)
8. (Germany) Steffi Graf (fourth round)
9. (Romania) Irina Spîrlea (fourth round)
10. (France) Nathalie Tauziat (fourth round)
11. (Switzerland) Patty Schnyder (quarterfinals)
12. (France) Mary Pierce (fourth round)
13. (South Africa) Amanda Coetzer (quarterfinals)
14. (Belgium) Dominique Van Roost (third round)
15. (Russia) Anna Kournikova (fourth round)
16. (Japan) Ai Sugiyama (second round)

== Draw ==
=== Key ===
- Q = Qualifier
- WC = Wild card
- LL = Lucky loser
- Alt = Alternate
- ITF = ITF entry
- PR = Protected ranking
- SR = Special ranking
- SE = Special exempt
- JE = Junior exempt
- JR = Junior Accelerator Programme entrant
- CO = College Accelerator Programme entrant
- NG = Next Gen Accelerator Program entrant
- w/o = Walkover
- r = Retired
- d = Defaulted

=== Finals ===
Quarterfinals
1	(Switzerland) Martina Hingis	6	6
6	(United States) Monica Seles	4	4
3	(Czech Republic) Jana Novotná	6	6
11	(Switzerland) Patty Schnyder	2	3
5	(United States) Venus Williams	2	6	6
4	(Spain) Arantxa Sánchez Vicario	6	1	1
13	(South Africa) Amanda Coetzer	0	4
2	(United States) Lindsay Davenport	6	6

Semifinals
1	(Switzerland) Martina Hingis	3	6	6
3	(Czech Republic) Jana Novotná	6	1	4
5	(United States) Venus Williams	4	4
2	(United States) Lindsay Davenport	6	6

Finals
1	(Switzerland) Martina Hingis	3	5
2	(United States) Lindsay Davenport	6	7

=== Top half ===
==== Section 1 ====
First round
1	(Switzerland) M Hingis	6	6
Q	(Poland) A Olsza	2	0
(Germany) A Huber	3	3
(Croatia) I Majoli	6	6
Q	(Czech Republic) L Richterová	2	1
(France) A Mauresmo	6	6
Q	(United States) J Craybas	1	6	3
(Japan) M Saeki	6	2	6
(South Korea) S-h Park	1	6	6
(Czech Republic) L Němečková	6	3	4
(France) N Dechy	6	7
(Austria) B Paulus	2	5
(Chinese Taipei) J Lee	4	7^{8}	6^{4}
(Spain) G León García	6	6^{6}	7^{7}
(Romania) R Dragomir	1	2
16	(Japan) A Sugiyama	6	6

Second round
1	(Switzerland) M Hingis	7^{7}	6
(Croatia) I Majoli	6^{4}	0
(France) A Mauresmo	6	6
(Japan) M Saeki	4	1
(South Korea) S-h Park	2	4
(France) N Dechy	6	6
(Spain) G León García	2
16	(Japan) A Sugiyama	3	r

Third round
1	(Switzerland) M Hingis	4	6	6
(France) A Mauresmo	6	2	2
(France) N Dechy	6	6
(Spain) G León García	4	4

Fourth round
1	(Switzerland) M Hingis	6	6
(France) N Dechy	4	4

==== Section 2 ====
First round
14	(Belgium) D Van Roost	6	6
(France) J Halard-Decugis	2	2
(Slovakia) K Studeníková	0	1
(Poland) M Grzybowska	6	6
WC	(United States) L Granville	6	6
(Argentina) P Suárez	4	4
(Australia) K Guse	4	1
(United States) K Po	6	6
Q	(Russia) E Kulikovskaya	4	6	6
(Czech Republic) S Kleinová	6	1	3
Q	(Federal Republic of Yugoslavia) S Načuk	2	3
(United States) A Miller	6	6
(South Africa) J Kruger	6	6
(Germany) B Rittner	1	3
(Argentina) F Labat	6^{0}	2
6	(United States) M Seles	7^{7}	6

Second round
14	(Belgium) D Van Roost	6	6
(Poland) M Grzybowska	0	0
WC	(United States) L Granville	3	3
(United States) K Po	6	6
Q	(Russia) E Kulikovskaya	1	6	2
(United States) A Miller	6	4	6
(South Africa) J Kruger	2	3
6	(United States) M Seles	6	6

Third round
14	(Belgium) D Van Roost	4	2
(United States) K Po	6	6
(United States) A Miller	3	3
6	(United States) M Seles	6	6

Fourth round
(United States) K Po	2	6	3
6	(United States) M Seles	6	4	6

==== Section 3 ====
First round
3	(Czech Republic) J Novotná	6	6
WC	(United States) J Capriati	4	3
(France) A Cocheteux	6	6
(Austria) S Dopfer	3	3
(Czech Republic) K Hrdličková	6	6
(Austria) B Schwartz	2	3
(France) S Testud	6	6
(Chinese Taipei) S-t Wang	0	2
(Thailand) T Tanasugarn	6^{3}	2
Q	(Bulgaria) P Stoyanova	7^{7}	6
(Australia) N Pratt	3	6	4
(United States) S Williams	6	3	6
(Ukraine) E Tatarkova	6	6^{6}	3
Q	(Germany) M Schnitzer	0	7^{8}	6
(Russia) E Likhovtseva	6^{0}	4
9	(Romania) I Spîrlea	7^{7}	6

Second round
3	(Czech Republic) J Novotná	6	7^{7}
(France) A Cocheteux	2	6^{1}
(Czech Republic) K Hrdličková	6^{5}	3
(France) S Testud	7^{7}	6
Q	(Bulgaria) P Stoyanova	2	1
(United States) S Williams	6	6
Q	(Germany) M Schnitzer	3	2
9	(Romania) I Spîrlea	6	6

Third round
3	(Czech Republic) J Novotná	6	6
(France) S Testud	2	3
(United States) S Williams	3	6	5
9	(Romania) I Spîrlea	6	0	7

Fourth round
3	(Czech Republic) J Novotná	6	6
9	(Romania) I Spîrlea	3	3

==== Section 4 ====
First round
11	(Switzerland) P Schnyder	7^{7}	7
(Japan) Y Yoshida	6^{5}	5
(United States) A Frazier	3	1
WC	(United States) B Rippner	6	6
(United States) MJ Fernández	6	7^{7}
Q	(Slovenia) T Križan	4	6^{4}
WC	(United States) A Stevenson	4	4
(France) A Fusai	6	6
(Croatia) M Lučić	6	6
(Netherlands) K Boogert	3	2
(Japan) N Sawamatsu	4	7	6
(Spain) C Torrens Valero	6	5	1
Q	(Germany) M Weingärtner	6	1	6
(United States) M Shaughnessy	4	6	2
(United States) C Morariu	2	6	1
8	(Germany) S Graf	6	3	6

Second round
11	(Switzerland) P Schnyder	6	6
WC	(United States) B Rippner	1	2
(United States) MJ Fernández	6	4	7^{12}
(France) A Fusai	3	6	6^{10}
(Croatia) M Lučić	4	6	6
(Japan) N Sawamatsu	6	1	1
Q	(Germany) M Weingärtner	0	1
8	(Germany) S Graf	6	6

Third round
11	(Switzerland) P Schnyder	6	7^{7}
(United States) MJ Fernández	1	6^{3}
(Croatia) M Lučić	1	1
8	(Germany) S Graf	6	6

Fourth round
11	(Switzerland) P Schnyder	6	6
8	(Germany) S Graf	3	4

=== Bottom half ===
==== Section 5 ====
First round
5	(United States) V Williams	6	6
(Bulgaria) E Pampoulova	1	0
Q	(Luxembourg) A Kremer	6	5	7
(Indonesia) Y Basuki	4	7	5
Q	(Belgium) L Courtois	6^{3}	4
(South Africa) M de Swardt	7^{7}	6
(Latvia) L Neiland	6^{5}	6	6
(Russia) T Panova	7^{7}	3	4
(Spain) M Serna	7^{7}	5	4
(Venezuela) MA Vento	6^{2}	7	6
(Switzerland) E Gagliardi	3	6^{3}
(Italy) L Golarsa	6	7^{7}
WC	(Canada) V Webb	4	2
(Zimbabwe) C Black	6	6
(Germany) M Babel	1	6	2
12	(France) M Pierce	6	4	6

Second round
5	(United States) V Williams	6	6
Q	(Luxembourg) A Kremer	1	3
(South Africa) M de Swardt	7	0	2
(Latvia) L Neiland	5	6	6
(Venezuela) MA Vento	4	6	4
(Italy) L Golarsa	6	3	6
(Zimbabwe) C Black	1	1
12	(France) M Pierce	6	6

Third round
5	(United States) V Williams	5
(Latvia) L Neiland	0	r
(Italy) L Golarsa	1	0
12	(France) M Pierce	6	6

Fourth round
5	(United States) V Williams	6	7^{7}
12	(France) M Pierce	1	6^{4}

==== Section 6 ====
First round
15	(Russia) A Kournikova	6	6
(France) L Ghirardi	1	3
Q	(United States) J Okada	2	2
(Czech Republic) R Bobková	6	6
(France) A Dechaume-Balleret	6	6
(United States) K Miller	4	2
(Israel) A Smashnova	4	6	2
(Italy) S Farina	6	3	6
(Sweden) Å Carlsson	6	6
(United Kingdom) S Smith	2	4
(Slovakia) K Habšudová	6	5	3
(France) S Pitkowski	1	7	6
Q	(Colombia) F Zuluaga	6	6
(Italy) R Grande	4	4
WC	(United States) K Brandi	2	2
4	(Spain) A Sánchez Vicario	6	6

Second round
15	(Russia) A Kournikova	6	6
(Czech Republic) R Bobková	3	4
(France) A Dechaume-Balleret	3	6	3
(Italy) S Farina	6	1	6
(Sweden) Å Carlsson	3	3
(France) S Pitkowski	6	6
Q	(Colombia) F Zuluaga	3	2
4	(Spain) A Sánchez Vicario	6	6

Third round
15	(Russia) A Kournikova	6	6
(Italy) S Farina	4	1
(France) S Pitkowski	2	3
4	(Spain) A Sánchez Vicario	6	6

Fourth round
15	(Russia) A Kournikova	6^{5}	3
4	(Spain) A Sánchez Vicario	7^{7}	6

==== Section 7 ====
First round
7	(Spain) C Martínez	6	6
(Netherlands) M Oremans	1	2
Q	(Argentina) M Díaz Oliva	6	r
(United States) J Trail	6
(Belarus) N Zvereva	3	6	6
(Australia) R McQuillan	6	3	4
(Spain) M Sánchez Lorenzo	3	3
(United States) L Raymond	6	6
WC	(United States) M Washington	3	3
(Austria) B Schett	6	6
(Japan) N Miyagi	6	5	2
(Austria) S Plischke	3	7	6
Q	(South Africa) L Horn	4	4
Q	(Romania) R Sandu	6	6
(United States) S Cacic	1	6^{3}
13	(South Africa) A Coetzer	6	7^{7}

Second round
7	(Spain) C Martínez	7^{7}	6
Q	(United States) J Trail	6^{4}	1
(Belarus) N Zvereva	2	2
(United States) L Raymond	6	6
(Austria) B Schett	6	7^{8}
(Austria) S Plischke	1	6^{6}
Q	(Romania) R Sandu	0	2
13	(South Africa) A Coetzer	6	6

Third round
7	(Spain) C Martínez	6	3	6
(United States) L Raymond	3	6	2
(Austria) B Schett	6	0	3
13	(South Africa) A Coetzer	3	6	6

Fourth round
7	(Spain) C Martínez	4	6	2
13	(South Africa) A Coetzer	6	4	6

==== Section 8 ====
First round
10	(France) N Tauziat	6	6
(Italy) F Perfetti	3	2
(Belarus) O Barabanschikova	6	6^{4}	6
(France) A-G Sidot	1	7^{7}	3
(China) F Li	3	2
(United States) C Rubin	6	6
(Slovakia) H Nagyová	6	6
(Czech Republic) A Gerši	2	0
(United States) T Snyder	6	6
(Germany) A Glass	4	1
(Spain) V Ruano Pascual	6	6
(Canada) J Nejedly	3	2
WC	(United States) S Reeves	6	4	1
(United States) L McNeil	4	6	6
(Romania) C Cristea	0	2
2	(United States) L Davenport	6	6

Second round
10	(France) N Tauziat	6^{4}	6	6
(Belarus) O Barabanschikova	7^{7}	2	3
(United States) C Rubin	6^{3}	4
(Slovakia) H Nagyová	7^{7}	6
(United States) T Snyder	4	4
(Spain) V Ruano Pascual	6	6
(United States) L McNeil	1	1
2	(United States) L Davenport	6	6

Third round
10	(France) N Tauziat	6	6
(Slovakia) H Nagyová	1	1
(Spain) V Ruano Pascual	2	1
2	(United States) L Davenport	6	6

Fourth round
10	(France) N Tauziat	1	4
2	(United States) L Davenport	6	6

Preceded by 1998 Wimbledon Championships – Women's singles	Grand Slam women's singles	Succeeded by 1999 Australian Open – Women's singles
