= 1998 US Open – Boys' singles =

Boys' singles
- 1998 US Open

Final
- Champion: (Argentina) David Nalbandian
- Runner-up: (Switzerland) Roger Federer
- Score: 6–3, 7–5

Events
Singles	men	women		boys	girls
Doubles	men	women	mixed	boys	girls
WC Singles	men	women	quad
WC Doubles	men	women	quad
Legends	men	women	mixed
- US Open

Arnaud Di Pasquale was the defending champion, but did not compete this year.

David Nalbandian won the title by defeating Roger Federer 6–3, 7–5 in the final.

== Seeds ==
1. (France) Julien Jeanpierre (third round)
2. (Chile) Fernando González (quarterfinals)
3. (Sweden) Andreas Vinciguerra (first round)
4. (Switzerland) Roger Federer (final)
5. (Argentina) Guillermo Coria (first round)
6. (Chinese Taipei) Cheng Wei-jen (third round)
7. (Brazil) Flávio Saretta (first round)
8. (Pakistan) Aisam-ul-Haq Qureshi (first round)
9. (United States) Taylor Dent (third round)
10. (Argentina) David Nalbandian (champion)
11. (Venezuela) José de Armas (first round)
12. (Czech Republic) Ladislav Chramosta (first round)
13. (Belgium) Olivier Rochus (third round)
14. (Croatia) Lovro Zovko (semifinals)
15. (Ivory Coast) Valentin Sanon (third round)
16. (Israel) Andy Ram (quarterfinals)

== Draw ==
Key

- Q = Qualifier
- WC = Wild card
- LL = Lucky loser
- Alt = Alternate
- ITF = ITF entry
- PR = Protected ranking
- SR = Special ranking
- SE = Special exempt
- JE = Junior exempt
- JR = Junior Accelerator Programme entrant
- CO = College Accelerator Programme entrant
- NG = Next Gen Accelerator Program entrant
- w/o = Walkover
- r = Retired
- d = Defaulted

=== Finals ===
Quarterfinals
16	(Israel) Andy Ram	6	5	3
10	(Argentina) David Nalbandian	4	7	6
14	(Croatia) Lovro Zovko	6	3	7^{7}
(United States) Zack Fleishman	0	6	6^{1}
(France) Jérôme Haehnel	5	6	1
4	(Switzerland) Roger Federer	7	3	6
(Denmark) Kristian Pless	6	6
2	(Chile) Fernando González	4	3

Semifinals
10	(Argentina) David Nalbandian	6	6
14	(Croatia) Lovro Zovko	2	2
4	(Switzerland) Roger Federer	6	4	6
(Denmark) Kristian Pless	3	6	3

Final
10	(Argentina) David Nalbandian	6	7
4	(Switzerland) Roger Federer	3	5

=== Top half ===
==== Section 1 ====
First round
1	(France) J Jeanpierre	6	6
(Argentina) M Boeker	4	3
(Czech Republic) Jakub Hašek	6	3	6
(Mexico) Jorge Haro	3	6	3
(Kazakhstan) A Kedryuk	2	6	3
(Austria) J Melzer	6	3	6
(India) Sanzaruz Zaman	2	1
16	(Israel) A Ram	6	6
10	(Argentina) D Nalbandian	6	6
(Hungary) B Veress	0	2
(North Macedonia) L Magdinčev	6	2	3
(Canada) R Steckley	3	6	6
(Russia) M Youzhny	6	6
(Germany) Sebastien Aickele	0	2
(Sweden) Johan Kareld	6	6
7	(Brazil) F Saretta	4	1

Second round
1	(France) J Jeanpierre	6	6	6
(Czech Republic) J Hašek	7	4	2
(Austria) J Melzer	6	7	4
16	(Israel) A Ram	7	6	6
10	(Argentina) D Nalbandian	6	6
(Canada) R Steckley	0	1
(Russia) M Youzhny	6	5	7
(Sweden) J Kareld	2	7	5

Third round
1	(France) J Jeanpierre	3	2
16	(Israel) A Ram	6	6
10	(Argentina) D Nalbandian	6	6
(Russia) M Youzhny	3	2

Quarterfinals
16	(Israel) A Ram	6	5	3
10	(Argentina) D Nalbandian	4	7	6

==== Section 2 ====
First round
3	(Sweden) A Vinciguerra	6	4
(Denmark) Bob Borella	7	6
(India) Manoj Mahadevan	4	4
(Finland) J Nieminen	6	6
(Latvia) Raimonds Sproga	6	4	4
(Monaco) Cyril Martin	3	6	6
(United States) S Lipsky	4	1
14	(Croatia) L Zovko	6	6
11	(Venezuela) J de Armas	6	7	3
(United States) Z Fleishman	7	5	6
(Germany) Christian-Michael Straka	6	7
(United States) L Joseph	3	5
(Australia) Mark Kovacs	7	6	3
(Germany) Philipp Hammer	6	7	6
(United Kingdom) Simon Dickson	6	4	2
6	(Chinese Taipei) Cheng Wei-jen	3	6	6

Second round
(Denmark) B Borella	2	4
(Finland) J Nieminen	6	6
(Monaco) C Martin	6	3
14	(Croatia) L Zovko	7	6
(United States) Z Fleishman	6	6
(Germany) CM Straka	3	3
(Germany) P Hammer	7	3	2
6	(Chinese Taipei) W-j Cheng	5	6	6

Third round
(Finland) J Nieminen	7	1	4
14	(Croatia) L Zovko	6	6	6
(United States) Z Fleishman	7	6
6	(Chinese Taipei) W-j Cheng	5	1

Quarterfinals
14	(Croatia) L Zovko	6	3	7
(United States) Z Fleishman	0	6	6

=== Bottom half ===
==== Section 3 ====
First round
5	(Argentina) G Coria	4	6
(United States) KJ Hippensteel	6	7
(India) Vijay Kannan	6	6
(United States) A Bogomolov Jr.	3	2
(Slovenia) A Kračman	3	6	3
(United Kingdom) M Hilton	6	2	6
(France) J Haehnel	6	6
12	(Czech Republic) Ladislav Chramosta	3	4
13	(Belgium) O Rochus	3	6	6
(Sweden) J Adaktusson	6	2	3
(United States) L Harper-Griffith	1	0
(United States) P King	6	6
(United States) Stephen Moros	2	2
(Austria) Philip Langer	6	6
(Germany) Boris Bachert	2	2
4	(Switzerland) R Federer	6	6

Second round
(United States) KJ Hippensteel	4	6	6
(India) V Kannan	6	3	2
(United Kingdom) M Hilton	4	4
(France) J Haehnel	6	6
13	(Belgium) O Rochus	6	6
(United States) P King	2	3
(Austria) P Langer	3	2
4	(Switzerland) R Federer	6	6

Third round
(United States) KJ Hippensteel	4	4
(France) J Haehnel	6	6
13	(Belgium) O Rochus	2	5
4	(Switzerland) R Federer	6	7

Quarterfinals
(France) J Haehnel	5	6	1
4	(Switzerland) R Federer	7	3	6

==== Section 4 ====
First round
8	(Pakistan) A Qureshi	6	2
(Denmark) K Pless	7	6
(United States) Robert Kowalczyk	7	6
(United States) M Fish	6	3
(Austria) L Pampoulov	2	7	6
(Netherlands Antilles) JJ Rojer	6	6	3
(Czech Republic) Jiří Vrbka	4	3
9	(United States) T Dent	6	6
15	(Ivory Coast) V Sanon	6	6
(Japan) Ryota Taguchi	4	4
(United States) D Martin	6	6
(Slovakia) K Beck	2	4
(Sweden) Alexander Hartman	0	4
(Germany) L Uebel	6	6
(United States) A Roddick	6	4	2
2	(Chile) F González	3	6	6

Second round
(Denmark) K Pless	6	6
(United States) R Kowalczyk	2	3
(Austria) L Pampoulov	4	1
9	(United States) T Dent	6	6
15	(Ivory Coast) V Sanon	7	6
(United States) D Martin	5	0
(Germany) L Uebel	2	1
2	(Chile) F González	6	6

Third round
(Denmark) K Pless	6	6
9	(United States) T Dent	4	2
15	(Ivory Coast) V Sanon	6	4
2	(Chile) F González	7	6

Quarterfinals
(Denmark) K Pless	6	6
2	(Chile) F González	4	3
