= 1998 US Open (tennis) =

- Date: August 31 – September 13
- Edition: 118th
- Category: Grand Slam (ITF)
- Surface: Hardcourt
- Location: New York City, New York, United States

Champions

Men's singles
- (Australia) Patrick Rafter

Women's singles
- (United States) Lindsay Davenport

Men's doubles
- (Australia) Sandon Stolle / (Czech Republic) Cyril Suk

Women's doubles
- (Switzerland) Martina Hingis / (Czech Republic) Jana Novotná

Mixed doubles
- (United States) Serena Williams / (Belarus) Max Mirnyi

Boys' singles
- (Argentina) David Nalbandian

Girls' singles
- (Australia) Jelena Dokić

Boys' doubles
- (United States) K. J. Hippensteel / (United States) David Martin

Girls' doubles
- (Belgium) Kim Clijsters / (Denmark) Eva Dyrberg
- US Open

The 1998 US Open was a tennis tournament played on outdoor hardcourts at the USTA National Tennis Center in New York City in New York in the United States. It was the 118th edition of the US Open and was held from August 31 through September 13, 1998.

== Seniors ==
=== Men's singles ===
(Australia) Patrick Rafter defeated (Australia) Mark Philippoussis, 6–3, 3–6, 6–2, 6–0

• It was Rafter's 2nd and last career Grand Slam singles title and his 2nd at the US Open.

=== Women's singles ===
(United States) Lindsay Davenport defeated (Switzerland) Martina Hingis, 6–3, 7–5

• It was Davenport's 1st career Grand Slam singles title and her 1st and only at the US Open.

=== Men's doubles ===
(Australia) Sandon Stolle / (Czech Republic) Cyril Suk defeated (The Bahamas) Mark Knowles / (Canada) Daniel Nestor, 4–6, 7–6, 6–2

• It was Stolle's 1st and only career Grand Slam doubles title.
• It was Suk's 1st and only career Grand Slam doubles title.

=== Women's doubles ===
(Switzerland) Martina Hingis / (Czech Republic) Jana Novotná defeated (United States) Lindsay Davenport / (Belarus) Natasha Zvereva 6–3, 6–3

- It was Hingis' 10th career Grand Slam title and her 2nd and last US Open title. It was Novotná's 17th and last career Grand Slam title and her 4th US Open title. With this victory Hingis completed the second doubles Grand Slam in a calendar year in the Open Era, with Martina Navratilova and Pam Shriver having completed the first in 1984.

=== Mixed doubles ===
(United States) Serena Williams / (Belarus) Max Mirnyi defeated (United States) Lisa Raymond / (United States) Patrick Galbraith 6–2, 6–2

• It was Williams's 2nd career Grand Slam mixed doubles title and her 1st at the US Open.
• It was Mirnyi's 2nd career Grand Slam mixed doubles title and his 1st at the US Open.

== Juniors ==
=== Boys' singles ===
(Argentina) David Nalbandian defeated (Switzerland) Roger Federer 6–3, 7–5

=== Girls' singles ===
(Australia) Jelena Dokić defeated (Slovenia) Katarina Srebotnik 6–4, 6–2

=== Boys' doubles ===
(United States) K. J. Hippensteel / (United States) David Martin defeated (Israel) Andy Ram / (Croatia) Lovro Zovko 6–7, 7–6, 6–2

=== Girls' doubles ===
(Belgium) Kim Clijsters / (Denmark) Eva Dyrberg defeated (Australia) Jelena Dokić / (Australia) Evie Dominikovic 7–6, 6–4

== Notes ==
Preceded by 1998 Wimbledon Championships	Grand Slams	Succeeded by 1999 Australian Open
