= 1997 Wimbledon Championships – Women's singles qualifying =

Women's singles qualifying
- 1997 Wimbledon Championships

Events
Singles	men	women		boys	girls
Doubles	men	women	mixed	boys	girls
WC Singles	men	women	quad
WC Doubles	men	women	quad
Legends	men	women	seniors

Qualification
Singles	men	women
Doubles	men	women
- Wimbledon Championships

Players and pairs who do not have sufficiently high rankings and have not received wild cards may enter a qualifying tournament held one week prior to the annual Wimbledon Tennis Championships.

The qualifying rounds for the 1997 Wimbledon Championships were played from 17 to 22 June 1997 at the Bank of England Ground in Roehampton, London, United Kingdom.

== Seeds ==
1. (Italy) Laura Golarsa (qualified)
2. (Germany) Marketa Kochta (second round)
3. (United States) Janet Lee (first round)
4. (Japan) Nana Miyagi (qualifying competition, lucky loser)
5. (South Korea) Park Sung-hee (first round)
6. (Czech Republic) Lenka Cenková (first round)
7. (Canada) Sonya Jeyaseelan (first round)
8. (Croatia) Silvija Talaja (qualifying competition)
9. (Germany) Marlene Weingärtner (second round)
10. (France) Amélie Mauresmo (qualifying competition)
11. (Australia) Kristine Kunce (second round)
12. (Australia) Siobhan Drake-Brockman (first round)
13. (Belgium) Nancy Feber (qualified)
14. (Chinese Taipei) Jane Chi (first round)
15. (Mexico) Angélica Gavaldón (second round)
16. (Austria) Sylvia Plischke (qualifying competition)

== Qualifiers ==
1. (Italy) Laura Golarsa
2. (Japan) Haruka Inoue
3. (Belgium) Nancy Feber
4. (Luxembourg) Anne Kremer
5. (United Kingdom) Zoe Clark
6. (Australia) Nicole Pratt
7. (Venezuela) María Vento
8. (Germany) Miriam Schnitzer

== Lucky loser ==
1. (Japan) Nana Miyagi

== Qualifying draw ==
=== First qualifier ===
First round
1	(Italy) Laura Golarsa	7	7
(Venezuela) Melissa Mazzotta	6	6
WC	(United Kingdom) Louise Latimer	6	7
(United States) Kelly Pace	0	5
(India) Nirupama Vaidyanathan	3	6	6
WC	(United Kingdom) Kate Warne-Holland	6	1	4
(United States) Meghann Shaughnessy	2	3
16	(Austria) Sylvia Plischke	6	6

Second round
1	(Italy) Laura Golarsa	7	4	6
WC	(United Kingdom) Louise Latimer	5	6	3
(India) Nirupama Vaidyanathan	6	4	3
16	(Austria) Sylvia Plischke	3	6	6

Qualifying competition
1	(Italy) Laura Golarsa	5	6	6
16	(Austria) Sylvia Plischke	7	3	3

=== Second qualifier ===
First round
12	(Australia) Siobhan Drake-Brockman	2	5
(Netherlands) Seda Noorlander	6	7
(United States) Laxmi Poruri	6	3	1
(Japan) Haruka Inoue	3	6	6
(Sweden) Kristina Triska	7	7
(South Africa) Liezel Horn	5	5
(Argentina) María José Gaidano	5	6	3
8	(Croatia) Silvija Talaja	7	3	6

Second round
(Netherlands) Seda Noorlander	2	0
(Japan) Haruka Inoue	6	6
(Sweden) Kristina Triska	6	4	2
8	(Croatia) Silvija Talaja	1	6	6

Qualifying competition
(Japan) Haruka Inoue	6	6
8	(Croatia) Silvija Talaja	1	2

=== Third qualifier ===
First round
4	(Japan) Nana Miyagi	6	6
WC	(United Kingdom) Lizzie Jelfs	0	2
(Canada) Maureen Drake	7	6
(Slovenia) Tina Križan	6	2
(Australia) Jane Taylor	7	6	3
(Japan) Yuko Hosoki	6	7	6
(South Africa) Mariaan de Swardt	0	5
13	(Belgium) Nancy Feber	6	7

Second round
4	(Japan) Nana Miyagi	6	7
(Canada) Maureen Drake	3	5
(Japan) Yuko Hosoki	4	2
13	(Belgium) Nancy Feber	6	6

Qualifying competition
4	(Japan) Nana Miyagi	3	4
13	(Belgium) Nancy Feber	6	6

=== Fourth qualifier ===
First round
10	(France) Amélie Mauresmo	6	6
WC	(United Kingdom) Abigail Tordoff	2	3
(Bulgaria) Svetlana Krivencheva	7	6
(United States) Lindsay Lee	6	0
(Luxembourg) Anne Kremer	7	7
(Ukraine) Elena Brioukhovets	5	5
(United States) Katrina Adams	6	6
6	(Czech Republic) Lenka Cenková	3	3

Second round
10	(France) Amélie Mauresmo	6	6
(Bulgaria) Svetlana Krivencheva	4	2
(Luxembourg) Anne Kremer	3	7	6
(United States) Katrina Adams	6	6	2

Qualifying competition
10	(France) Amélie Mauresmo	6	6	4
(Luxembourg) Anne Kremer	4	7	6

=== Fifth qualifier ===
First round
5	(South Korea) Park Sung-hee	7	4	5
(United States) Tara Snyder	5	6	7
WC	(United Kingdom) Helen Crook	6	5	3
(Czech Republic) Jana Pospíšilová	4	7	6
WC	(United Kingdom) Karen Cross	6	7
(Colombia) Fabiola Zuluaga	2	5
(United States) Debbie Graham	2	5
11	(Australia) Kristine Kunce	6	7

Second round
(United States) Tara Snyder	6	6
(Czech Republic) Jana Pospíšilová	1	0
WC	(United Kingdom) Zoe Clark	4	7	6
11	(Australia) Kristine Kunce	6	6	2

Qualifying competition
(United States) Tara Snyder	6	4	6
WC	(United Kingdom) Zoe Clark	4	6	8

=== Sixth qualifier ===
First round
9	(Germany) Marlene Weingärtner	2	6	6
(United States) Erika deLone	6	1	4
(Australia) Nicole Pratt	6	6
(Argentina) Bettina Fulco-Villella	2	3
WC	(United Kingdom) Amanda Wainwright	4	6
(Hungary) Virág Csurgó	6	7
(Argentina) Mercedes Paz	0	6	6
3	(United States) Janet Lee	6	2	4

Second round
9	(Germany) Marlene Weingärtner	1	6
(Australia) Nicole Pratt	6	7
(Hungary) Virág Csurgó	6	2	4
(Argentina) Mercedes Paz	4	6	6

Qualifying competition
(Australia) Nicole Pratt	6	7
(Argentina) Mercedes Paz	4	5

=== Seventh qualifier ===
First round
7	(Canada) Sonya Jeyaseelan	6	3	4
(Venezuela) María Vento	3	6	6
(San Marino) Ludmilla Varmuza	3	6	6
(Romania) Raluca Sandu	6	3	1
(South Korea) Jeon Mi-ra	6	6
(Hungary) Réka Vidáts	4	2
(Ukraine) Olga Lugina	0^{r}
15	(Mexico) Angélica Gavaldón	1

Second round
(Venezuela) María Vento	6	6
(San Marino) Ludmilla Varmuza	3	3
(South Korea) Jeon Mi-ra	7	6
15	(Mexico) Angélica Gavaldón	6	3

Qualifying competition
(Venezuela) María Vento	6	6
(South Korea) Jeon Mi-ra	4	4

=== Eighth qualifier ===
First round
14	(Chinese Taipei) Jane Chi	4	3
(France) Lea Ghirardi-Rubbi	6	6
WC	(United Kingdom) Amanda Janes	6	6
(United States) Lilia Osterloh	2	2
(Germany) Miriam Schnitzer	7	4	6
(Hungary) Petra Gáspár	6	6	4
(Ukraine) Elena Tatarkova	2	3
2	(Germany) Marketa Kochta	6	6

Second round
(France) Lea Ghirardi-Rubbi	6	6	4
WC	(United Kingdom) Amanda Janes	4	7	6
(Germany) Miriam Schnitzer	6	6
2	(Germany) Marketa Kochta	3	3

Qualifying competition
WC	(United Kingdom) Amanda Janes	6	6	5
(Germany) Miriam Schnitzer	7	2	7
