= 1997 Wimbledon Championships – Women's doubles qualifying =

Women's doubles qualifying
- 1997 Wimbledon Championships

Events
| Singles | men | women | | boys | girls |
| Doubles | men | women | mixed | boys | girls |
| WC Singles | men | women | quad |
| WC Doubles | men | women | quad |
| Legends | men | women | seniors |

Qualification
| Singles | men | women |
| Doubles | men | women |
- Wimbledon Championships

Players and pairs who neither have high enough rankings nor receive wild cards may participate in a qualifying tournament held one week before the annual Wimbledon Tennis Championships.

The qualifying rounds for the 1997 Wimbledon Championships were played from 17 to 22 June 1997 at the Bank of England Ground in Roehampton, London, United Kingdom.

== Seeds ==
1. (United Kingdom) Valda Lake / (Australia) Louise Pleming (qualified)
2. (Bulgaria) Svetlana Krivencheva / (Czech Republic) Ludmila Richterová (first round)
3. (Japan) Yuko Hosoki / (Japan) Keiko Nagatomi (first round)
4. (United States) Rebecca Jensen / (United States) Lindsay Lee (first round)

== Qualifiers ==
1. (United Kingdom) Valda Lake / (Australia) Louise Pleming
2. (Ukraine) Elena Brioukhovets / (Ukraine) Elena Tatarkova

== Lucky losers ==
1. (Russia) Julia Lutrova / (United Kingdom) Jane Wood

== Qualifying draw ==
=== First qualifier ===
First round
1 | (United Kingdom) Valda Lake (Australia) Louise Pleming | 3 | 6 | 6
Alt | (Germany) Marketa Kochta (United Kingdom) Jheni Osman | 6 | 1 | 0
(Argentina) María José Gaidano (Austria) Marion Maruska | 6 | 4 | 7
(Switzerland) Emmanuelle Gagliardi (India) Nirupama Vaidyanathan | 2 | 6 | 9
3 | (Japan) Yuko Hosoki (Japan) Keiko Nagatomi | 6 | 6 | 3
(Czech Republic) Lenka Cenková (Germany) Marlene Weingärtner | 7 | 1 | 6
(Australia) Siobhan Drake-Brockman (Hungary) Réka Vidáts | 4 | 4
(South Korea) Jeon Mi-ra (Japan) Hiroko Mochizuki | 6 | 6

Second round
1 | (United Kingdom) Valda Lake (Australia) Louise Pleming
(Switzerland) Emmanuelle Gagliardi (India) Nirupama Vaidyanathan | w/o
(Czech Republic) Lenka Cenková (Germany) Marlene Weingärtner | 4 | 6 | 6
(South Korea) Jeon Mi-ra (Japan) Hiroko Mochizuki | 6 | 3 | 4

Qualifying competition
1 | (United Kingdom) Valda Lake (Australia) Louise Pleming | 3 | 7 | 6
(Czech Republic) Lenka Cenková (Germany) Marlene Weingärtner | 6 | 5 | 1

=== Second qualifier ===
First round
(United Kingdom) Lizzie Jelfs (United Kingdom) Louise Latimer | 4 | 5
(Chinese Taipei) Jane Chi (United States) Kelly Pace | 6 | 7
(Ukraine) Elena Brioukhovets (Ukraine) Elena Tatarkova | 6 | 7 | 6
4 | (United States) Rebecca Jensen (United States) Lindsay Lee | 7 | 5 | 3
(Zimbabwe) Cara Black (Kazakhstan) Irina Selyutina | 6 | 6
(United Kingdom) Helen Crook (United Kingdom) Victoria Davies | 1 | 3
(Russia) Julia Lutrova (United Kingdom) Jane Wood | 7 | 7
2 | (Bulgaria) Svetlana Krivencheva (Czech Republic) Ludmila Richterová | 5 | 6

Second round
(United States) Jane Chi (United States) Kelly Pace | 1 | 3
(Ukraine) Elena Brioukhovets (Ukraine) Elena Tatarkova | 6 | 6
(Zimbabwe) Cara Black (Kazakhstan) Irina Selyutina | 6 | 4
(Russia) Julia Lutrova (United Kingdom) Jane Wood | 7 | 6

Qualifying competition
(Ukraine) Elena Brioukhovets (Ukraine) Elena Tatarkova | 6 | 6
(Russia) Julia Lutrova (United Kingdom) Jane Wood | 0 | 4
