= 1997 Wimbledon Championships – Men's singles qualifying =

Men's singles qualifying
- 1997 Wimbledon Championships

Events
Singles	men	women		boys	girls
Doubles	men	women	mixed	boys	girls
WC Singles	men	women	quad
WC Doubles	men	women	quad
Legends	men	women	seniors

Qualification
Singles	men	women
Doubles	men	women
- Wimbledon Championships

Players and pairs who neither have high enough rankings nor receive wild cards may participate in a qualifying tournament held one week before the annual Wimbledon Tennis Championships.

== Seeds ==
1. (Belgium) Dick Norman (second round)
2. (France) Olivier Delaître (second round)
3. (France) Stéphane Simian (second round)
4. (Argentina) Gastón Etlis (second round)
5. (Israel) Eyal Ran (second round)
6. (United States) Steve Bryan (qualifying competition, lucky loser)
7. (Russia) Andrei Olhovskiy (second round)
8. (Venezuela) Nicolás Pereira (qualifying competition, lucky loser)
9. (United States) Steve Campbell (second round)
10. (France) Stéphane Huet (qualifying competition, lucky loser)
11. (The Bahamas) Mark Knowles (first round)
12. (United States) Jeff Salzenstein (qualified)
13. (Argentina) Martín Rodríguez (first round)
14. (United States) Michael Joyce (second round)
15. (Czech Republic) Petr Luxa (second round)
16. (Argentina) Guillermo Cañas (second round)
17. (United States) Cecil Mamiit (first round)
18. (South Africa) Kevin Ullyett (second round)
19. (France) Nicolas Escudé (second round)
20. (France) Frédéric Fontang (second round)
21. (Italy) Gianluca Pozzi (second round)
22. (Australia) Ben Ellwood (qualifying competition, lucky loser)
23. (Mexico) Luis Herrera (qualified)
24. (Israel) Oren Motevassel (qualifying competition)
25. (Germany) Arne Thoms (first round)
26. (Romania) Ionuț Moldovan (second round)
27. (Switzerland) Ivo Heuberger (second round)
28. (Paraguay) Ramón Delgado (second round)
29. (South Africa) David Nainkin (qualifying competition)
30. (Germany) Rainer Schüttler (first round)
31. (United States) Brian MacPhie (second round)
32. (Israel) Eyal Erlich (qualifying competition)

== Qualifiers ==
1. (Australia) Michael Tebbutt
2. (Netherlands) Hendrik Jan Davids
3. (Belgium) Christophe Van Garsse
4. (Spain) Sergi Durán
5. (Czech Republic) David Rikl
6. (United States) Wade McGuire
7. (Australia) Todd Larkham
8. (Germany) Patrick Baur
9. (Australia) Pat Cash
10. (Mexico) Luis Herrera
11. (France) Rodolphe Gilbert
12. (United States) Jeff Salzenstein
13. (Spain) Óscar Burrieza
14. (India) Mahesh Bhupathi
15. (France) Arnaud Clément
16. (Netherlands) John van Lottum

== Lucky losers ==
1. (United States) Steve Bryan
2. (Venezuela) Nicolás Pereira
3. (France) Stéphane Huet
4. (Australia) Ben Ellwood

== Qualifying draw ==
=== First qualifier ===
First round
1	(Belgium) Dick Norman	6	6
(Spain) Germán López	3	4
(Australia) Michael Tebbutt	2	7	6
(France) Jean-Philippe Fleurian	6	6	4
(France) Sébastien Grosjean	6	3	15
(France) Lionel Barthez	4	6	13
(Japan) Shuzo Matsuoka	7	4	4
31	(United States) Brian MacPhie	6	6	6

Second round
1	(Belgium) Dick Norman	4	4
(Australia) Michael Tebbutt	6	6
(France) Sébastien Grosjean	6	6
31	(United States) Brian MacPhie	4	1

Qualifying competition
(Australia) Michael Tebbutt	6	2	6
(France) Sébastien Grosjean	3	6	4

=== Second qualifier ===
First round
2	(France) Olivier Delaître	6	6	6
(Germany) Lars Rehmann	3	7	3
(Netherlands) Hendrik Jan Davids	7	6
WC	(United Kingdom) Tom Spinks	6	3
(Sweden) Mikael Stadling	4	6	3
(Netherlands) Mosé Navarra	6	4	6
(Spain) Francisco Fogués	0	2
32	(Israel) Eyal Erlich	6	6

Second round
2	(France) Olivier Delaître	1	6	5
(Netherlands) Hendrik Jan Davids	6	3	7
(Netherlands) Mosé Navarra	6	3	4
32	(Israel) Eyal Erlich	1	6	6

Qualifying competition
(Netherlands) Hendrik Jan Davids	6	6
32	(Israel) Eyal Erlich	3	4

=== Third qualifier ===
First round
3	(France) Stéphane Simian	6	6
(Australia) Allen Belobrajdic	2	2
(Spain) Quino Muñoz	1	3
(Belgium) Christophe Van Garsse	6	6
(Australia) Peter Tramacchi	7	6
WC	(United Kingdom) Colin Bennett	5	3
(United States) Alex Reichel	6	6
30	(Germany) Rainer Schüttler	3	4

Second round
3	(France) Stéphane Simian	2	2
(Belgium) Christophe Van Garsse	6	6
(Australia) Peter Tramacchi	6	7
(United States) Alex Reichel	2	6

Qualifying competition
(Belgium) Christophe Van Garsse	6	6
(Australia) Peter Tramacchi	4	3

=== Fourth qualifier ===
First round
4	(Argentina) Gastón Etlis	7	7
(Germany) Gerald Fauser	5	5
(United States) Jan-Michael Gambill	4	6
(Spain) Sergi Durán	6	7
(New Zealand) Alistair Hunt	4	6	6
(Spain) Álex López Morón	6	4	1
(Sweden) Fredrik Bergh	4	6	1
29	(South Africa) David Nainkin	6	1	6

Second round
4	(Argentina) Gastón Etlis	7	6	7
(Spain) Sergi Durán	6	7	9
(New Zealand) Alistair Hunt	7	6	2
29	(South Africa) David Nainkin	6	7	6

Qualifying competition
(Spain) Sergi Durán	2	6	11
29	(South Africa) David Nainkin	6	4	9

=== Fifth qualifier ===
First round
5	(Israel) Eyal Ran	6	6
(Italy) Laurence Tieleman	1	4
(France) Nicolas Kischkewitz	1	2
(France) Pierre Bouteyre	6	6
(Israel) Noam Behr	5	3
(Czech Republic) David Rikl	7	6
(France) Jean-François Bachelot	7	4	2
28	(Paraguay) Ramón Delgado	6	6	6

Second round
5	(Israel) Eyal Ran	2	1
(France) Pierre Bouteyre	6	6
(Czech Republic) David Rikl	3	6	6
28	(Paraguay) Ramón Delgado	6	2	3

Qualifying competition
(France) Pierre Bouteyre	4	3
(Czech Republic) David Rikl	6	6

=== Sixth qualifier ===
First round
6	(United States) Steve Bryan	3	6	8
WC	(United Kingdom) Paul Maggs	6	3	6
(Italy) Giorgio Galimberti	6	3	6
(Argentina) Federico Browne	4	6	4
(United States) Wade McGuire	4
(Italy) Diego Nargiso	1^{r}
(New Zealand) Steven Downs	6	4	1
27	(Switzerland) Ivo Heuberger	4	6	6

Second round
6	(United States) Steve Bryan	3	6	6
(Italy) Giorgio Galimberti	6	4	2
(United States) Wade McGuire	7	6
27	(Switzerland) Ivo Heuberger	5	0

Qualifying competition
6	(United States) Steve Bryan	4	2
(United States) Wade McGuire	6	6

=== Seventh qualifier ===
First round
7	(Russia) Andrei Olhovskiy	6	6
(Argentina) Andrés Zingman	0	4
(United States) Bryan Shelton	6	3	6
(Germany) Karsten Braasch	3	6	3
(Italy) Stefano Pescosolido	1	4
(Australia) Todd Larkham	6	6
WC	(United Kingdom) Danny Ward	3	2
26	(Romania) Ionuț Moldovan	6	6

Second round
7	(Russia) Andrei Olhovskiy	1	6
(United States) Bryan Shelton	6	7
(Australia) Todd Larkham	6	6
26	(Romania) Ionuț Moldovan	0	3

Qualifying competition
(United States) Bryan Shelton	6	3
(Australia) Todd Larkham	7	6

=== Eighth qualifier ===
First round
8	(Venezuela) Nicolás Pereira	6	6
(Argentina) Gastón Gaudio	3	1
(Spain) Tati Rascón	6	6
(United States) Jim Grabb	7	7
Alt	(Germany) Patrick Baur	6	6
(Germany) Mark Joachim	2	3
(Israel) Raviv Weidenfeld	6	6
25	(Germany) Arne Thoms	3	4

Second round
8	(Venezuela) Nicolás Pereira	6	6
(United States) Jim Grabb	4	2
Alt	(Germany) Patrick Baur	2	7	6
(Israel) Raviv Weidenfeld	6	6	2

Qualifying competition
8	(Venezuela) Nicolás Pereira	2	1
Alt	(Germany) Patrick Baur	6	6

=== Ninth qualifier ===
First round
9	(United States) Steve Campbell	6	6
(Belarus) Alexander Shvets	1	4
WC	(Australia) Pat Cash	4	6	6
(France) Thierry Guardiola	6	3	1
(Germany) Marcus Hilpert	2	2
(France) Philippe Pech	6	6
(Australia) Jaymon Crabb	6	5
24	(Israel) Oren Motevassel	7	7

Second round
9	(United States) Steve Campbell	6	2	9
WC	(Australia) Pat Cash	4	6	11
(France) Philippe Pech	6	3
24	(Israel) Oren Motevassel	7	6

Qualifying competition
WC	(Australia) Pat Cash	4	6	6
24	(Israel) Oren Motevassel	6	3	4

=== Tenth qualifier ===
First round
10	(France) Stéphane Huet	6	6
(Australia) Steven Randjelovic	2	1
(Argentina) Francisco Cabello	7	4	3
(South Africa) Chris Haggard	5	6	6
(United States) Glenn Weiner	4	3
(Romania) Gabriel Trifu	6	6
(Germany) Axel Pretzsch	3	1
23	(Mexico) Luis Herrera	6	6

Second round
10	(France) Stéphane Huet	6	1	6
(South Africa) Chris Haggard	2	6	4
(Romania) Gabriel Trifu	6	1
23	(Mexico) Luis Herrera	7	6

Qualifying competition
10	(France) Stéphane Huet	1	3
23	(Mexico) Luis Herrera	6	6

=== Eleventh qualifier ===
First round
11	(The Bahamas) Mark Knowles	3	2
(South Africa) Robbie Koenig	6	6
(Australia) Michael Hill	7	7
(Argentina) Carlos Gómez-Díaz	6	6
WC	(United Kingdom) Paul Hand	3	2
(France) Rodolphe Gilbert	6	6
(Spain) Álex Calatrava	2	4
21	(Italy) Gianluca Pozzi	6	6

Second round
(South Africa) Robbie Koenig	3	6	4
(Australia) Michael Hill	6	4	6
(France) Rodolphe Gilbert	6	7
21	(Italy) Gianluca Pozzi	0	5

Qualifying competition
(Australia) Michael Hill	5	3
(France) Rodolphe Gilbert	7	6

=== Twelfth qualifier ===
First round
12	(United States) Jeff Salzenstein	6	6
WC	(United Kingdom) Barry Cowan	4	4
(France) Régis Lavergne	4	7	7
(France) Pier Gauthier	6	6	9
(Finland) Tuomas Ketola	7	6
(Spain) Jordi Mas	6	2
(Spain) Joan Balcells	3	7	4
22	(Australia) Ben Ellwood	6	6	6

Second round
12	(United States) Jeff Salzenstein	7	6
(France) Pier Gauthier	5	2
(Finland) Tuomas Ketola	6	6	5
22	(Australia) Ben Ellwood	1	7	7

Qualifying competition
12	(United States) Jeff Salzenstein	6	6
22	(Australia) Ben Ellwood	4	2

=== Thirteenth qualifier ===
First round
13	(Argentina) Martín Rodríguez	4	3
(France) Nicolas Thomann	6	6
(Spain) Victor Sendin	2	1
(Spain) Óscar Burrieza	6	6
WC	(United Kingdom) Dan Lobb	4	3
(United Kingdom) Miles Maclagan	6	6
(Ukraine) Andrei Rybalko	2	6	3
20	(France) Frédéric Fontang	6	4	6

Second round
(France) Nicolas Thomann	5	7	6
(Spain) Óscar Burrieza	7	6	8
(United Kingdom) Miles Maclagan	7	6
20	(France) Frédéric Fontang	6	2

Qualifying competition
(Spain) Óscar Burrieza	6	7
(United Kingdom) Miles Maclagan	3	6

=== Fourteen qualifier ===
First round
14	(United States) Michael Joyce	6	6
(Croatia) Saša Hiršzon	1	2
(Netherlands) Joost Winnink	6	7
(Zimbabwe) Wayne Black	4	5
(India) Mahesh Bhupathi	6	6
(Spain) David Salvador-Estepa	0	2
(Australia) James Sekulov	4	1
19	(France) Nicolas Escudé	6	6

Second round
14	(United States) Michael Joyce	2	2
(Netherlands) Joost Winnink	6	6
(India) Mahesh Bhupathi	6	6
19	(France) Nicolas Escudé	4	2

Qualifying competition
(Netherlands) Joost Winnink	4	3
(India) Mahesh Bhupathi	6	6

=== Fifteenth qualifier ===
First round
15	(Czech Republic) Petr Luxa	6	6
WC	(United Kingdom) Christian Wall	2	1
(France) Arnaud Clément	6	6
(France) Cyril Buscaglione	3	4
(Belarus) Max Mirnyi	7	4	6
(Uruguay) Federico Dondo	6	6	0
(Australia) Mark Draper	6	6
17	(United States) Cecil Mamiit	3	4

Second round
15	(Czech Republic) Petr Luxa	4	3
(France) Arnaud Clément	6	6
(Belarus) Max Mirnyi	4	6	3
(Australia) Mark Draper	6	3	6

Qualifying competition
(France) Arnaud Clément	6	7
(Australia) Mark Draper	4	5

=== Sixteenth qualifier ===
First round
16	(Argentina) Guillermo Cañas	6	6
(United Kingdom) Colin Beecher	0	3
(Netherlands) Martijn Bok	0	4
(Netherlands) John van Lottum	6	6
(Australia) Grant Doyle	6	6
(Argentina) Damián Furmanski	0	0
(Switzerland) Filippo Veglio	2	3
18	(South Africa) Kevin Ullyett	6	6

Second round
16	(Argentina) Guillermo Cañas	6	4	6
(Netherlands) John van Lottum	1	6	8
(Australia) Grant Doyle	7	6
18	(South Africa) Kevin Ullyett	6	4

Qualifying competition
(Netherlands) John van Lottum	6	6	7
(Australia) Grant Doyle	7	4	5
