= 1997 Wimbledon Championships – Men's doubles qualifying =

Men's doubles qualifying
- 1997 Wimbledon Championships

Events
Singles	men	women		boys	girls
Doubles	men	women	mixed	boys	girls
WC Singles	men	women	quad
WC Doubles	men	women	quad
Legends	men	women	seniors

Qualification
Singles	men	women
Doubles	men	women
- Wimbledon Championships

Players and pairs who neither have high enough rankings nor receive wild cards may participate in a qualifying tournament held one week before the annual Wimbledon Tennis Championships.

== Seeds ==
1. (United States) David DiLucia / (The Bahamas) Roger Smith (qualified)
2. (Sweden) Fredrik Bergh / (Sweden) Patrik Fredriksson (first round)
3. (South Africa) Neville Godwin / (United States) Bryan Shelton (first round)
4. (United States) Chad Clark / (United States) Trey Phillips (first round)
5. (Czech Republic) Petr Luxa / (Czech Republic) Radek Štěpánek (second round)
6. (United States) Bill Behrens / (South Africa) Chris Haggard (qualifying competition, lucky losers)

== Qualifiers ==
1. (United States) David DiLucia / (The Bahamas) Roger Smith
2. (Australia) Ben Ellwood / (Australia) Peter Tramacchi
3. (South Africa) Robbie Koenig / (United States) Andrew Rueb

== Lucky losers ==
1. (France) Régis Lavergne / (France) Stéphane Simian
2. (United States) Bill Behrens / (South Africa) Chris Haggard
3. (Sweden) Henrik Holm / (Sweden) Nils Holm

== Qualifying draw ==
=== First qualifier ===
First round
1	(United States) David DiLucia (The Bahamas) Roger Smith	6	4	6
(Argentina) Guillermo Cañas (Argentina) Damián Furmanski	4	6	3
(New Zealand) James Greenhalgh (New Zealand) Alistair Hunt	6	7
(Argentina) Marcelo Charpentier (Puerto Rico) José Frontera	3	6
(Spain) Juan Ignacio Carrasco (Spain) Carlos Martínez	4	4
(France) Régis Lavergne (France) Stéphane Simian	6	6
(Finland) Tuomas Ketola (United States) Charlie Singer	6	3	3
5	(Czech Republic) Petr Luxa (Czech Republic) Radek Štěpánek	3	6	6

Second round
1	(United States) David DiLucia (The Bahamas) Roger Smith	6	6
(New Zealand) James Greenhalgh (New Zealand) Alistair Hunt	3	4
(France) Régis Lavergne (France) Stéphane Simian	7	6
5	(Czech Republic) Petr Luxa (Czech Republic) Radek Štěpánek	6	3

Qualifying competition
1	(United States) David DiLucia (The Bahamas) Roger Smith	6	7	8
(France) Régis Lavergne (France) Stéphane Simian	7	5	6

=== Second qualifier ===
First round
2	(Sweden) Fredrik Bergh (Sweden) Patrik Fredriksson	3	2
(Australia) Grant Doyle (South Africa) Myles Wakefield	6	6
WC	(United Kingdom) Colin Beecher (United Kingdom) Tom Spinks	4	6	3
(Australia) Ben Ellwood (Australia) Peter Tramacchi	6	3	6
(Australia) Jamie Holmes (Australia) Andrew Painter	6	6
(Israel) Amir Hadad (Israel) Eyal Ran	1	2
WC	(United Kingdom) Paul Hand (United Kingdom) Miles Maclagan	6	6	2
6	(United States) Bill Behrens (South Africa) Chris Haggard	3	7	6

Second round
(Australia) Grant Doyle (South Africa) Myles Wakefield	w/o
(Australia) Ben Ellwood (Australia) Peter Tramacchi
(Australia) Jamie Holmes (Australia) Andrew Painter	6	7	2
6	(United States) Bill Behrens (South Africa) Chris Haggard	7	6	6

Qualifying competition
(Australia) Ben Ellwood (Australia) Peter Tramacchi	6	6	7
6	(United States) Bill Behrens (South Africa) Chris Haggard	7	4	5

=== Third qualifier ===
First round
3	(South Africa) Neville Godwin (United States) Bryan Shelton	7	6	3
(Belgium) Dick Norman (United States) Kenny Thorne	6	7	6
(Italy) Massimo Bertolini (Italy) Mosé Navarra	7	5	4
(Switzerland) Lorenzo Manta (Italy) Laurence Tieleman	6	7	6
(South Africa) Robbie Koenig (United States) Andrew Rueb	4	6	6
(United States) Steve Campbell (Germany) Marcus Hilpert	6	2	3
Alt	(Sweden) Henrik Holm (Sweden) Nils Holm	6	6
4	(United States) Chad Clark (United States) Trey Phillips	4	0

Second round
(Belgium) Dick Norman (United States) Kenny Thorne	7	6
(Switzerland) Lorenzo Manta (Italy) Laurence Tieleman	6	3
(South Africa) Robbie Koenig (United States) Andrew Rueb	6	6
Alt	(Sweden) Henrik Holm (Sweden) Nils Holm	4	4

Qualifying competition
(Belgium) Dick Norman (United States) Kenny Thorne	1	6	3
(South Africa) Robbie Koenig (United States) Andrew Rueb	6	4	6
