= 1997 Wimbledon Championships – Boys' singles =

Boys' singles
- 1997 Wimbledon Championships

Final
- Champion: (South Africa) Wesley Whitehouse
- Runner-up: (Germany) Daniel Elsner
- Score: 6–3, 7–6^{(8–6)}

Events
Singles	men	women		boys	girls
Doubles	men	women	mixed	boys	girls
WC Singles	men	women	quad
WC Doubles	men	women	quad
Legends	men	women	seniors
- Wimbledon Championships

Wesley Whitehouse defeated Daniel Elsner in the final, 6–3, 7–6^{(8–6)} to win the boys' singles tennis title at the 1997 Wimbledon Championships.

== Seeds ==
1. (Germany) Daniel Elsner (final)
2. (Peru) Luis Horna (third round)
3. (Chile) Nicolás Massú (second round)
4. (Israel) Kobi Ziv (third round)
5. (South Africa) Wesley Whitehouse (champion)
6. (France) Julien Jeanpierre (quarterfinals)
7. (Chile) Fernando González (third round)
8. (Thailand) Paradorn Srichaphan (first round)
9. (France) Jean-René Lisnard (semifinals)
10. (Belgium) Xavier Malisse (quarterfinals)
11. (Czech Republic) Robin Vik (second round)
12. (Slovenia) Miha Gregorc (quarterfinals)
13. (Belgium) Olivier Rochus (semifinals)
14. (United States) Brian Vahaly (quarterfinals)
15. (Chinese Taipei) Cheng Wei-jen (second round)
16. (France) Olivier Levant (first round)

Click on the seed number of a player to go to their draw section.

== Draw ==
Key

- Q = Qualifier
- WC = Wild card
- LL = Lucky loser
- Alt = Alternate
- ITF = ITF entry
- PR = Protected ranking
- SR = Special ranking
- SE = Special exempt
- JE = Junior exempt
- JR = Junior Accelerator Programme entrant
- CO = College Accelerator Programme entrant
- NG = Next Gen Accelerator Program entrant
- w/o = Walkover
- r = Retired
- d = Defaulted

=== Finals ===
Quarterfinals
1	(Germany) Daniel Elsner	6	6
6	(France) Julien Jeanpierre	2	3
14	(United States) Brian Vahaly	3	4
13	(Belgium) Olivier Rochus	6	6
5	(South Africa) Wesley Whitehouse	6	6
12	(Slovenia) Miha Gregorc	3	2
10	(Belgium) Xavier Malisse	3	5
9	(France) Jean-René Lisnard	6	7

Semifinals
1	(Germany) Daniel Elsner	6	6	6
13	(Belgium) Olivier Rochus	1	7	3
5	(South Africa) Wesley Whitehouse	6	6
9	(France) Jean-René Lisnard	3	4

Final
1	(Germany) Daniel Elsner	3	6^{6}
5	(South Africa) Wesley Whitehouse	6	7^{8}

=== Top half ===
==== Section 1 ====
First round
1	(Germany) Daniel Elsner	6	6
(France) Jérôme Haehnel	4	2
(Russia) Kirill Ivanov-Smolensky	6	6
(Sweden) Jacob Adaktusson	3	3
(Egypt) Sherif Zaher	6	2	2
(United Kingdom) Adrian Barnes	4	6	6
(Federal Republic of Yugoslavia) Nikola Gnjatović	1	5
11	(Czech Republic) Robin Vik	6	7
15	(Chinese Taipei) Cheng Wei-jen	6	6	9
(Norway) Thomas Heyerdahl	7	0	7
(Israel) Andy Ram	3	2
(Australia) Lleyton Hewitt	6	6
(Poland) Jakub Ilowski	5	3
(France) Michaël Llodra	7	6
(Hungary) Balázs Váci	3	2
6	(France) Julien Jeanpierre	6	6

Second round
1	(Germany) D Elsner	6	6
(Russia) K Ivanov-Smolensky	3	1
(United Kingdom) A Barnes	6	6
11	(Czech Republic) R Vik	1	3
15	(Chinese Taipei) W-j Cheng	1	2
(Australia) L Hewitt	6	6
(France) M Llodra	7	2	4
6	(France) J Jeanpierre	6	6	6

Third round
1	(Germany) D Elsner	6	6
(United Kingdom) A Barnes	2	1
(Australia) L Hewitt	3	4
6	(France) J Jeanpierre	6	6

Quarterfinals
1	(Germany) D Elsner	6	6
6	(France) J Jeanpierre	2	3

==== Section 2 ====
First round
3	(Chile) Nicolás Massú	6	6
(Indonesia) Febi Widhiyanto	3	3
(Argentina) Federico Cardinali	7	6
(Italy) Dario Sciortino	5	3
(South Africa) Jaco van der Westhuisen	5	4
(United Kingdom) Iain Bates	7	6
(Slovakia) František Babej	4	6	3
14	(United States) Brian Vahaly	6	3	6
13	(Belgium) Olivier Rochus	6	6
(Mexico) Víctor Romero	3	2
(Japan) Takahiro Terachi	4	6	6
(Croatia) Luka Kutanjac	6	3	4
(Czech Republic) Ladislav Chramosta	3	2
(United Kingdom) David Sherwood	6	6
(Brazil) Alexandre Simoni	6	4	6
8	(Thailand) Paradorn Srichaphan	3	6	1

Second round
3	(Chile) N Massú	6	6	4
(Argentina) F Cardinali	1	7	6
(United Kingdom) I Bates	3	2
14	(United States) B Vahaly	6	6
13	(Belgium) O Rochus	6	5	7
(Japan) T Terachi	4	7	5
(United Kingdom) D Sherwood	1	6
(Brazil) A Simoni	6	7

Third round
(Argentina) F Cardinali	6	6	4
14	(United States) B Vahaly	3	7	6
13	(Belgium) O Rochus	6	2	6
(Brazil) A Simoni	3	6	4

Quarterfinals
14	(United States) B Vahaly	3	4
13	(Belgium) O Rochus	6	6

=== Bottom half ===
==== Section 3 ====
First round
5	(South Africa) Wesley Whitehouse	6	6
(Pakistan) Aisam-ul-Haq Qureshi	4	3
(Italy) Federico Luzzi	6	6	6
(South Korea) Lee Seung-hoon	3	7	4
(United Kingdom) James Trotman	1	6	2
(Romania) Dragoș-Robert Niță	6	2	6
(Poland) Filip Aniola	7	7
16	(France) Olivier Levant	5	5
12	(Slovenia) Miha Gregorc	3	6	6
(Ukraine) Olexandr Karpenko	6	0	4
(Egypt) Marwan Zewar	3	6	6
(Argentina) Alejandro Dulko	6	3	4
(Slovakia) Miloslav Grolmus	3	6	6
(Croatia) Ivan Beroš	6	3	3
(Russia) Artem Derepasko	6	4
4	(Israel) Kobi Ziv	7	6

Second round
5	(South Africa) W Whitehouse	6	2	6
(Italy) F Luzzi	2	6	0
(Romania) D-R Niță	6	6
(Poland) F Aniola	3	4
12	(Slovenia) M Gregorc	7	6
(Egypt) M Zewar	5	0
(Slovakia) M Grolmus	5	6
4	(Israel) K Ziv	7	7

Third round
5	(South Africa) W Whitehouse	6	6
(Romania) D-R Niță	4	2
12	(Slovenia) M Gregorc	6	3	6
4	(Israel) K Ziv	3	6	3

Quarterfinals
5	(South Africa) W Whitehouse	6	6
12	(Slovenia) M Gregorc	3	2

==== Section 4 ====
First round
7	(Chile) Fernando González	6	6
(United States) Nathan Overholser	4	4
(United Kingdom) Daniel Belcher	6	6
(Nigeria) Rotimi Jegede	3	2
(Australia) Nathan Healey	6	6	4
(Germany) Thomas Messmer	7	3	6
(Hungary) Zoltán Papp	3	3
10	(Belgium) Xavier Malisse	6	6
9	(France) Jean-René Lisnard	6	6
(Republic of Ireland) David Mullins	2	2
(Mexico) Ricardo Rizo	6	2	4
(Sweden) Joel Christensen	3	6	6
(United Kingdom) Simon Dickson	6	6
(Dominican Republic) Jorge Dueñas	4	4
(United States) Taylor Dent	2	3
2	(Peru) Luis Horna	6	6

Second round
7	(Chile) F González	6	6
2	(United Kingdom) D Belcher	3	2
(Germany) T Messmer	2	2
10	(Belgium) X Malisse	6	6
9	(France) J-R Lisnard	6	6
(Sweden) J Christensen	1	2
(United Kingdom) S Dickson	4	7	2
2	(Peru) L Horna	6	6	6

Third round
7	(Chile) F González	2	6
10	(Belgium) X Malisse	6	7
9	(France) J-R Lisnard	5	6	6
2	(Peru) L Horna	7	2	4

Quarterfinals
10	(Belgium) X Malisse	3	5
9	(France) J-R Lisnard	6	7
