= 1997 Wimbledon Championships – Boys' doubles =

Boys' doubles
- 1997 Wimbledon Championships

Final
- Champions: (Peru) Luis Horna (Chile) Nicolás Massú
- Runners-up: (South Africa) Jaco van der Westhuizen (South Africa) Wesley Whitehouse
- Score: 6–4, 6–2

Events
| Singles | men | women | | boys | girls |
| Doubles | men | women | mixed | boys | girls |
| WC Singles | men | women | quad |
| WC Doubles | men | women | quad |
| Legends | men | women | seniors |
| ← 1996 · | Wimbledon Championships | · 1998 → |

Daniele Bracciali and Jocelyn Robichaud were the defending champions, but both turned 18 years old during the season and, therefore, were unable to compete in Juniors.

Luis Horna and Nicolás Massú defeated Jaco van der Westhuizen and Wesley Whitehouse in the final, 6–4, 6–2 to win the boys' doubles tennis title at the 1997 Wimbledon Championships. It was the 2nd Grand Slam title for Horna and the 1st Grand Slam title for Massú in their respective junior doubles careers.

== Seeds ==
1. (Peru) Luis Horna / (Chile) Nicolás Massú (champions)
2. (South Africa) Jaco van der Westhuizen / (South Africa) Wesley Whitehouse (final)
3. (France) Jérôme Haehnel / (France) Julien Jeanpierre (first round)
4. (United Kingdom) David Sherwood / (United Kingdom) James Trotman (first round)

== Draw ==
=== Key ===
- Q = Qualifier
- WC = Wild card
- LL = Lucky loser
- Alt = Alternate
- SE = Special exempt
- PR = Protected ranking
- ITF = ITF entry
- JE = Junior exempt
- w/o = Walkover
- r = Retired
- d = Defaulted
- SR = Special ranking

=== Draw ===
First round
1 | (Peru) Luis Horna (Chile) Nicolás Massú | 7 | 6
(South Korea) Lee Seung-hoon (Japan) Takahiro Terachi | 6 | 2
(Australia) Nathan Healey (Australia) Lleyton Hewitt | 6 | 7
(Germany) Daniel Elsner (Germany) Thomas Messmer | 4 | 5
3 | (France) Jérôme Haehnel (France) Julien Jeanpierre | 4 | 2
(Argentina) Alejandro Dulko (Brazil) Alexandre Simoni | 6 | 6
(Thailand) Paradorn Srichaphan (Israel) Kobi Ziv | 7 | 5 | 9
(Italy) Federico Luzzi (Israel) Andy Ram | 5 | 7 | 11
(United Kingdom) Iain Bates (Slovenia) Miha Gregorc
(Belgium) Xavier Malisse (Belgium) Olivier Rochus | w/o
(United Kingdom) Adrian Barnes (Russia) Kirill Ivanov-Smolensky | 6 | 7
4 | (United Kingdom) David Sherwood (United Kingdom) James Trotman | 2 | 5
(United Kingdom) Simon Dickson (United Kingdom) Dan Kiernan | 6 | 6
(Argentina) Federico Cardinali (Chile) Fernando González | 1 | 4
(Slovakia) František Babej (Slovakia) Miloslav Grolmus | 4 | 4
2 | (South Africa) Jaco van der Westhuisen (South Africa) Wesley Whitehouse | 6 | 6

Quarterfinals
1 | (Peru) Luis Horna (Chile) Nicolás Massú | 7 | 6
(Australia) Nathan Healey (Australia) Lleyton Hewitt | 6 | 4
(Argentina) Alejandro Dulko (Brazil) Alexandre Simoni | 6 | 6 | 6
(Italy) Federico Luzzi (Israel) Andy Ram | 7 | 2 | 8
(United Kingdom) Iain Bates (Slovenia) Miha Gregorc | 3 | 5
(United Kingdom) Adrian Barnes (Russia) Kirill Ivanov-Smolensky | 6 | 7
(United Kingdom) Simon Dickson (United Kingdom) Dan Kiernan | 6 | 6 | 3
2 | (South Africa) Jaco van der Westhuizen (South Africa) Wesley Whitehouse | 3 | 7 | 6

Semifinals
1 | (Peru) Luis Horna (Chile) Nicolás Massú | 6 | 6
(Italy) Federico Luzzi (Israel) Andy Ram | 3 | 4
(United Kingdom) Adrian Barnes (Russia) Kirill Ivanov-Smolensky | 6 | 5
2 | (South Africa) Jaco van der Westhuizen (South Africa) W Whitehouse | 7 | 7

Final
1 | (Peru) Luis Horna (Chile) Nicolás Massú | 6 | 6
2 | (South Africa) Jaco van der Westhuizen (South Africa) Wesley Whitehouse | 4 | 2
