= Miha Gregorc =

Slovenian tennis player

- Country (sports): Slovenia
- Born: 15 January 1979 (age 46); Ljubljana, Slovenia
- Plays: Right-handed
- Prize money: $23,753

Singles
- Career record: 0–1 (Davis Cup)
- Highest ranking: No. 554 (11 Sep 2000)

Doubles
- Highest ranking: No. 754 (27 Nov 2006)

Miha Gregorc (born 15 March 1979) is a Slovenian former professional tennis player.

Born in Ljubljana, Gregorc was a Petits As champion and Wimbledon junior quarter-finalist, ranking as high as 21 on the ITF Junior Circuit. In 2000 he represented Slovenia in a Davis Cup tie against Egypt and lost a dead rubber singles match to Karim Maamoun. He is the elder brother of tennis player Luka Gregorc.

== ITF Futures finals ==
=== Singles: 2 (1–1) ===
Result	W–L	Date	Tournament	Surface	Opponent	Score
Loss	0–1	Nov 1998	Thailand F1, Bangkok	Hard	(Thailand) Paradorn Srichaphan	7–6, 1–6, 3–6
Win	1–1	Nov 1999	USA F18, Lafayette	Hard	(United States) Wade McGuire	4–6, 6–3, 6–4

=== Doubles: 4 (2–2) ===
Result	W–L	Date	Tournament	Surface	Partner	Opponents	Score
Win	1–0	Sep 1999	Turkey F5, Adora	Carpet	(Slovenia) Andrej Kračman	(Belgium) Timothy Aerts (Germany) Arne Kreitz	6–1, 6–4
Loss	1–1	Mar 2006	Mexico F3, Chetumal	Hard	(Mexico) Mario Vergara	(Mexico) Bruno Echagaray (Mexico) Carlos Palencia	2–6, 1–6
Win	2–1	May 2006	Mexico F6, Celaya	Hard	(Canada) Philip Gubenco	(Romania) Roman Borvanov (Switzerland) Sven Swinnen	6–3, 1–6, 7–5
Loss	2–2	Aug 2006	Ecuador F1, Guayaquil	Hard	(France) Pierrick Ysern	(Argentina) Juan-Pablo Amado (Argentina) Brian Dabul	2–6, 4–6
