= Wesley Whitehouse =

South African-New Zealand tennis player (born 1979)

- Country (sports): South Africa; New Zealand
- Residence: Pretoria, South Africa and Phoenix, Arizona
- Born: 13 March 1979 (age 46); Empangeni, South Africa
- Height: 190 cm (6 ft 3 in)
- Turned pro: 1998
- Retired: 2015
- Plays: Left-handed (two-handed backhand)
- Prize money: $195,247

Singles
- Career record: 4–7
- Career titles: 0
- Highest ranking: No. 214 (2 August 2004)

Grand Slam singles results
- Australian Open: Q2 (1999)
- Wimbledon: Q3 (1999, 2004)
- US Open: Q3 (1998)

Doubles
- Career record: 3–6
- Career titles: 0
- Highest ranking: No. 137 (22 November 1999)

Grand Slam doubles results
- Wimbledon: 3R (1999)
- US Open: Q2 (1999)
- Last updated on: 19 September 2021.

Wesley Whitehouse (born 13 March 1979) is a South African-born New Zealand tennis player.

== Biography ==
Whitehouse lives or has lived in between Pretoria, South Africa and Phoenix, Arizona but currently lives in Auckland, New Zealand

== Career ==
=== Juniors ===
In 1997 he was Wimbledon Tennis Junior Champion defeating Daniel Elsner of Germany 6–3, 7–6^{(6)}. He was also a finalist in both the Australian Open and US Open juniors in the same year. He has played in many other tournaments since then.

=== Pro tour ===
Whitehouse reached a career-high singles ranking on the ATP Tour of world No. 214. He defeated Marat Safin at Indianapolis in 2006.

== Junior Grand Slam finals ==
=== Singles: 3 (1 title, 2 runner-ups) ===
Result	Year	Tournament	Surface	Opponent	Score
Loss	1997	Australian Open	Hard	(Germany) Daniel Elsner	6–7, 2–6
Win	1997	Wimbledon	Grass	(Germany) Daniel Elsner	6–3, 7–6
Loss	1997	US Open	Hard	(France) Arnaud Di Pasquale	7–6, 4–6, 1–6

=== Doubles: 3 (3 runner-ups) ===
Result	Year	Tournament	Surface	Partner	Opponents	Score
Loss	1996	Wimbledon	Grass	(South Africa) Damien Roberts	(Canada) Jocelyn Robichaud (Italy) Daniele Bracciali	2–6, 4–6
Loss	1997	Australian Open	Hard	(South Africa) Jaco Van Der Westhuizen	(United Kingdom) David Sherwood (United Kingdom) James Trotman	6–7, 3–6
Loss	1997	Wimbledon	Grass	(South Africa) Jaco Van Der Westhuizen	(Peru) Luis Horna (Chile) Nicolás Massú	4–6, 2–6

== Performance timeline ==
Key
W	F	SF	QF	#R	RR	Q#	DNQ	A	NH

(W) winner; (F) finalist; (SF) semifinalist; (QF) quarterfinalist; (#R) rounds 4, 3, 2, 1; (RR) round-robin stage; (Q#) qualification round; (DNQ) did not qualify; (A) absent; (NH) not held; (SR) strike rate (events won / competed); (W–L) win–loss record.

=== Singles ===
Tournament	1998	1999	2000	2001	2002	2003	2004	2005	2006	2007	SR	W–L	Win %
Grand Slam tournaments
Australian Open	A	Q2	A	A	A	A	A	A	A	A	0 / 0	0–0	–
French Open	A	A	A	A	A	A	A	A	A	A	0 / 0	0–0	–
Wimbledon	Q2	Q3	A	A	A	A	Q3	A	Q1	Q1	0 / 0	0–0	–
US Open	Q3	A	A	A	A	A	Q2	A	A	A	0 / 0	0–0	–
Win–loss	0–0	0–0	0–0	0–0	0–0	0–0	0–0	0–0	0–0	0–0	0 / 0	0–0	–

== ATP Challenger and ITF Futures finals ==
=== Singles: 12 (8–4) ===
Legend ATP Challenger (0–1) ITF Futures (8–3)	Finals by surface Hard (7–4) Clay (1–0) Grass (0–0) Carpet (0–0)

Result	W–L	Date	Tournament	Tier	Surface	Opponent	Score
Loss	0–1	Jun 2001	Namibia F1, Windhoek	Futures	Hard	(South Africa) Willem-Petrus Meyer	7–6^{(8–6)}, 4–6, 6–7^{(2–7)}
Win	1–1	Oct 2002	Namibia F1, Windhoek	Futures	Hard	(Zimbabwe) Gwinyai Tongoona	7–5, 6–1
Win	2–1	Nov 2002	Botswana F1, Gaborone	Futures	Hard	(Zimbabwe) Genius Chidzikwe	6–4, 6–2
Win	3–1	Nov 2002	Zimbabwe F1, Bulawayo	Futures	Hard	(Zimbabwe) Genius Chidzikwe	4–6, 6–3, 6–3
Win	4–1	Aug 2003	Nigeria F3, Lagos	Futures	Hard	(Ivory Coast) Valentin Sanon	6–4, 6–1
Win	5–1	Sep 2003	Kenya F1, Mombasa	Futures	Hard	(Egypt) Mohamed Mamoun	7–5, 2–6, 7–6^{(8–6)}
Win	6–1	Oct 2003	Rwanda F2, Kigali	Futures	Clay	(Czech Republic) Jaroslav Pospíšil	6–4, 4–6, 7–5
Win	7–1	Oct 2003	Nigeria F5, Lagos	Futures	Hard	(South Africa) Willem-Petrus Meyer	6–4, 6–2
Loss	7–2	Oct 2004	Austin, United States	Challenger	Hard	(United States) Robert Kendrick	5–7, 7–6^{(7–2)}, 2–6
Loss	7–3	Nov 2004	Botswana F1, Gaborone	Futures	Hard	(South Africa) Kevin Anderson	7–6^{(7–1)}, 4–6, 6–7^{(13–15)}
Win	8–3	Feb 2007	USA F4, Brownsville	Futures	Hard	(Romania) Horia Tecău	6–3, 3–6, 7–5
Loss	8–4	Mar 2007	USA F6, McAllen	Futures	Hard	(Canada) Peter Polansky	3–6, 2–6

=== Doubles: 28 (19–9) ===
Legend ATP Challenger (6–3) ITF Futures (13–6)	Finals by surface Hard (18–6) Clay (0–2) Grass (1–1) Carpet (0–0)

Result	W–L	Date	Tournament	Tier	Surface	Partner	Opponents	Score
Win	1–0	Apr 1998	Vadodara, India	Challenger	Grass	(South Africa) Myles Wakefield	(Australia) Peter Tramacchi (Belarus) Max Mirnyi	7–6, 7–6
Win	2–0	Aug 1998	Binghamton, United States	Challenger	Hard	(South Africa) Myles Wakefield	(Czech Republic) Petr Luxa (Mexico) Bernardo Martínez	7–5, 2–6, 7–5
Loss	2–1	Feb 1999	Calcutta, India	Challenger	Grass	(United Kingdom) Barry Cowan	(Israel) Noam Behr (Israel) Eyal Ran	4–6, 7–6, 2–6
Loss	2–2	Apr 1999	New Delhi, India	Challenger	Hard	(United Kingdom) Barry Cowan	(Israel) Noam Behr (Israel) Eyal Ran	3–6, 6–4, 4–6
Win	3–2	Sep 1999	Austin, United States	Challenger	Hard	(South Africa) Marcos Ondruska	(United States) Paul Goldstein (United States) Adam Peterson	7–5, 4–6, 6–2
Loss	3–3	Aug 2000	Lexington, United States	Challenger	Hard	(South Africa) Grant Stafford	(Switzerland) Lorenzo Manta (Italy) Laurence Tieleman	6–7^{(5–7)}, 6–7^{(3–7)}
Win	4–3	Aug 2000	Bronx, United States	Challenger	Hard	(Czech Republic) Petr Luxa	(South Korea) Lee Hyung-taik (South Korea) Yoon Yong-il	3–6, 6–3, 6–2
Win	5–3	Oct 2000	San Antonio, United States	Challenger	Hard	(South Africa) Gareth Williams	(United States) Bob Bryan (United States) Mike Bryan	6–3, 6–4
Win	6–3	Mar 2001	New Zealand F3, Tauranga	Futures	Hard	(Canada) Jocelyn Robichaud	(Australia) Mark Draper (Hong Kong) John Hui	6–3, 6–3
Loss	6–4	Jun 2001	Namibia F1, Windhoek	Futures	Hard	(South Africa) Willem-Petrus Meyer	(South Africa) Andrew Anderson (South Africa) Dirk Stegmann	6–7^{(8–10)}, 3–6
Win	7–4	Nov 2001	USA F27, Malibu	Futures	Hard	(United States) Zack Fleishman	(South Africa) Willem-Petrus Meyer (United States) Ramsey Smith	7–5, 6–4
Win	8–4	Mar 2002	New Zealand F3, Auckland	Futures	Hard	(South Africa) Willem-Petrus Meyer	(South Africa) Dirk Stegmann (South Africa) Johan Du Randt	6–4, 3–6, 6–1
Win	9–4	Oct 2002	Namibia F1, Windhoek	Futures	Hard	(South Africa) Johannes Saayman	(South Africa) Andrew Anderson (South Africa) Dirk Stegmann	4–6, 6–4, 6–4
Loss	9–5	Mar 2003	New Zealand F1, Blenheim	Futures	Hard	(South Africa) Johan Du Randt	(Switzerland) Stéphane Bohli (Japan) Jun Kato	6–7^{(6–8)}, 6–4, 3–6
Win	10–5	Mar 2003	New Zealand F3, Auckland	Futures	Hard	(South Africa) Johan Du Randt	(New Zealand) Alistair Hunt (New Zealand) James Shortall	6–2, 6–4
Loss	10–6	Aug 2003	Nigeria F3, Lagos	Futures	Hard	(South Africa) Willem-Petrus Meyer	(India) Mustafa Ghouse (Ivory Coast) Claude N'Goran	6–1, 6–7^{(6–8)}, 2–6
Win	11–6	Aug 2003	Nigeria F4, Lagos	Futures	Hard	(South Africa) Willem-Petrus Meyer	(Zimbabwe) Genius Chidzikwe (Zimbabwe) Gwinyai Tongoona	6–2, 6–2
Win	12–6	Sep 2003	Kenya F1, Mombasa	Futures	Hard	(South Africa) Willem-Petrus Meyer	(Netherlands) Bart Beks (Netherlands) Matwé Middelkoop	6–3, 7–6^{(7–3)}
Loss	12–7	Sep 2003	Rwanda F1, Kigali	Futures	Clay	(South Africa) Willem-Petrus Meyer	(Czech Republic) Dušan Karol (Czech Republic) Jaroslav Pospíšil	4–6, 6–7^{(1–7)}
Loss	12–8	Oct 2003	Rwanda F2, Kigali	Futures	Clay	(South Africa) Willem-Petrus Meyer	(Czech Republic) Dušan Karol (Czech Republic) Jaroslav Pospíšil	walkover
Win	13–8	Oct 2003	Nigeria F5, Lagos	Futures	Hard	(South Africa) Willem-Petrus Meyer	(Austria) Martin Slanar (Israel) Tomer Suissa	7–6^{(7–3)}, 6–3
Win	14–8	Apr 2004	USA F9, Mobile	Futures	Hard	(United States) Michael Kosta	(Spain) Esteban Carril (Spain) Gabriel Trujillo Soler	6–3, 6–3
Loss	14–9	Nov 2004	Botswana F1, Gaborone	Futures	Hard	(South Africa) Benjamin Janse Van Rensburg	(South Africa) Stephen Mitchell (South Africa) Kevin Anderson	6–7^{(1–7)}, 6–7^{(5–7)}
Win	15–9	Mar 2006	USA F6, McAllen	Futures	Hard	(Canada) Pierre-Ludovic Duclos	(Netherlands) Michel Koning (Netherlands) Steven Korteling	6–3, 6–4
Win	16–9	Mar 2006	USA F7, Little Rock	Futures	Hard	(Colombia) Michael Quintero Aguilar	(United States) Brendan Evans (United States) Scott Oudsema	6–4, 6–2
Win	17–9	Mar 2007	USA F5, Harlingen	Futures	Hard	(South Africa) Izak van der Merwe	(United States) Nicholas Monroe (Romania) Horia Tecău	6–3, 6–1
Win	18–9	Apr 2007	Tallahassee, United States	Challenger	Hard	(South Africa) Izak van der Merwe	(United States) John Paul Fruttero (United States) Mirko Pehar	6–3, 6–4
Win	19–9	Jul 2007	USA F14, Shingle Springs	Futures	Hard	(South Africa) Izak van der Merwe	(United States) Ryler Deheart (United States) Ryan Rowe	6–4, 6–1
