= Cristina Popescu (tennis) =

Canadian tennis player (born 1979)

- Full name: Mihaela Cristina Popescu Faurei
- Country (sports): Canada
- Born: December 20, 1979 (age 45); Bucharest, Romania
- Plays: Right-handed
- Prize money: $13,531

Singles
- Highest ranking: No. 441 (Aug 12, 1996)

Doubles
- Highest ranking: No. 544 (Nov 9, 1998)

Mihaela Cristina Popescu Faurei (born December 20, 1979) is a former Canadian professional tennis player.

Born in Bucharest, Romania, Popescu left her native country with her family in 1989. She was ranked amongst the world's top 10 in junior tennis and was an Australian Open girls' singles semi-finalist. In 1996 she made WTA Tour main draw appearance at the Canadian Open and Canadian Indoor tournaments. She played collegiate tennis for the UCLA Bruins and suffered a series of injuries during this time that caused her to retire from tennis.

== ITF finals ==
=== Singles: 1 (0–1) ===
Outcome	No.	Date	Tournament	Surface	Opponent	Score
Runner–up	1.	Jul 1998	ITF Edmond, United States	Hard	(Australia) Cindy Watson	6–3, 4–6, 2–6
