= Daniel Elsner =

German tennis player

- Country (sports): Germany
- Residence: Memmingerberg, Germany
- Born: 4 January 1979 (age 46); Memmingerberg, West Germany
- Height: 1.82 m (5 ft 11 1/2 in)
- Turned pro: 1997
- Plays: Right-handed (two-handed backhand)
- Prize money: US$369,334

Singles
- Career record: 8–27
- Career titles: 0
- Highest ranking: No. 92 (23 October 2000)

Grand Slam singles results
- Australian Open: 1R (2001)
- French Open: 2R (2004)
- Wimbledon: 1R (2001)
- US Open: 1R (2004)

Doubles
- Career record: 1–3
- Career titles: 0
- Highest ranking: No. 505 (19 June 2000)
- Last updated on: 19 September 2021.

Daniel Elsner (born 4 January 1979) is a former professional German tennis player.

== Juniors ==
Elsner was an outstanding juniors player. He won 3 consecutive juniors grand slam singles titles: the 1996 Juniors U.S. Open, the 1997 Juniors Australian Open, and 1997 Juniors French Open; as well as making the finals of the subsequent 1997 Juniors Wimbledon. He is one of only 12 male players (as of May 2017) to win at least 3 junior grand slam singles titles, and one of only 4 to do so consecutively. He was a World No. 1 junior player in singles.

== ATP Tour ==
Elsner turned professional in 1997 and won several futures tournaments, but had limited success on the ATP tour. His professional highlight was making the semi-finals of the Stuttgart Open in 2000, beating then ATP world No. 2 ranked Magnus Norman en route 46 76 64. He obtained a career high rank of 92 during that year. His best grand slam result was the 2nd round of the French Open in 2004. He last played on the ATP World Tour in October 2008.

== Junior Grand Slam finals ==
=== Singles: 4 (3 titles, 1 runner-up) ===
Result	Year	Tournament	Surface	Opponent	Score
Win	1996	US Open	Hard	(Austria) Markus Hipfl	6–3, 6–2
Win	1997	Australian Open	Hard	(South Africa) Wesley Whitehouse	7–6, 6–2
Win	1997	French Open	Clay	(Peru) Luis Horna	6–4, 6–4
Loss	1997	Wimbledon	Grass	(South Africa) Wesley Whitehouse	3–6, 6–7

=== Doubles: 1 (1 runner-up) ===
Result	Year	Tournament	Surface	Partnet	Opponents	Score
Loss	1996	French Open	Clay	(Germany) Jan-Ralph Brandt	(France) Olivier Mutis (France) Sébastien Grosjean	2–6, 3–6

== ATP Challenger and ITF Futures finals ==
=== Singles: 19 (14–5) ===
Legend ATP Challenger (6–3) ITF Futures (8–2)	Finals by surface Hard (3–1) Clay (10–4) Grass (0–0) Carpet (1–0)

Result	W–L	Date	Tournament	Tier	Surface	Opponent	Score
Win	1–0	Apr 1998	Germany F3, Riemerling	Futures	Clay	(France) Jérôme Haehnel	6–0, 6–3
Win	2–0	Jun 1998	Germany F10, Albstadt	Futures	Clay	(Germany) Carsten Arriens	6–3, 6–2
Win	3–0	Jun 1998	Germany F11, Trier	Futures	Clay	(Italy) Igor Gaudi	6–3, 6–7, 6–3
Win	4–0	Apr 2000	France F9, Clermont-Ferrand	Futures	Carpet	(France) Olivier Mutis	6–3, 6–4
Win	5–0	Apr 2000	France F10, Saint-Brieuc	Futures	Clay	(Germany) Tobias Clemens	6–2, 6–1
Win	6–0	Apr 2000	Germany F1, Berlin	Futures	Hard	(Czech Republic) Jan Vacek	6–2, 7–5
Loss	6–1	Jun 2000	Furth, Germany	Challenger	Clay	(Georgia (country)) Irakli Labadze	4–6, 4–6
Win	7–1	Jun 2000	Weiden, Germany	Challenger	Clay	(Belgium) Filip Dewulf	6–1, 7–6^{(7–5)}
Loss	7–2	Jun 2002	Germany F6, Oberweiler	Futures	Clay	(Belgium) Kristof Vliegen	1–6, 0–1 ret.
Win	8–2	Apr 2003	Australia F2, Devonport	Futures	Hard	(Australia) Todd Larkham	4–6, 7–5, 6–4
Win	9–2	Aug 2003	Mönchengladbach, Germany	Challenger	Clay	(Georgia (country)) Irakli Labadze	6–1, 2–6, 6–3
Win	10–2	Sep 2003	Brașov, Romania	Challenger	Clay	(Romania) Răzvan Sabău	6–2, 6–1
Loss	10–3	Sep 2003	Sofia, Bulgaria	Challenger	Clay	(France) Stéphane Robert	1–6, 6–4, 6–7^{(4–7)}
Loss	10–4	Jun 2004	Braunschweig, Germany	Challenger	Clay	(Czech Republic) Tomáš Berdych	6–4, 1–6, 4–6
Win	11–4	Jul 2004	Zell, Germany	Challenger	Clay	(Germany) Dieter Kindlmann	6–3, 6–1
Win	12–4	Sep 2005	Brașov, Romania	Challenger	Clay	(Spain) Daniel Gimeno Traver	7–5, 6–2
Win	13–4	May 2006	Zagreb, Croatia	Challenger	Clay	(Romania) Victor Crivoi	4–6, 6–1, 6–2
Win	14–4	Apr 2007	Sweden F2, Linköping	Futures	Hard	(Sweden) Mikael Ekman	6–3, 6–1
Loss	14–5	Oct 2007	Germany F20, Isernhagen	Futures	Hard	(Germany) Andre Wiesler	4–6, ret.

=== Doubles: 4 (1–3) ===
Legend ATP Challenger (0–1) ITF Futures (1–2)	Finals by surface Hard (1–0) Clay (0–1) Grass (0–0) Carpet (0–2)

Result	W–L	Date	Tournament	Tier	Surface	Partner	Opponents	Score
Loss	0–1	Sep 1999	Germany F10, Oberhaching	Futures	Carpet	(Germany) Tomas Zivnicek	(Czech Republic) Petr Kovačka (Czech Republic) Pavel Kudrnáč	4–6, 7–6, 6–7
Loss	0–2	Jun 2000	Weiden, Germany	Challenger	Clay	(Germany) Andy Fahlke	(New Zealand) Mark Nielsen (Russia) Andrei Stoliarov	5–7, 3–6
Win	1–2	Jan 2003	Germany F1B, Biberach	Futures	Hard	(Germany) Philipp Petzschner	(Italy) Alberto Brizzi (Sweden) Michael Ryderstedt	6–4, 6–4
Loss	1–3	Jan 2003	Germany F1C, Munich	Futures	Carpet	(Germany) Philipp Petzschner	(Slovakia) Michal Mertiňák (Slovakia) Igor Zelenay	6–4, 6–7^{(18–20)}, 6–7^{(5–7)}

== Performance timeline ==
Key
W	F	SF	QF	#R	RR	Q#	DNQ	A	NH

(W) winner; (F) finalist; (SF) semifinalist; (QF) quarterfinalist; (#R) rounds 4, 3, 2, 1; (RR) round-robin stage; (Q#) qualification round; (DNQ) did not qualify; (A) absent; (NH) not held; (SR) strike rate (events won / competed); (W–L) win–loss record.

=== Singles ===
Tournament	1996	1997	1998	1999	2000	2001	2002	2003	2004	2005	2006	SR	W–L	Win %
Grand Slam tournaments
Australian Open	A	A	A	A	A	1R	A	A	Q2	A	Q1	0 / 1	0–1	0%
French Open	A	A	A	A	A	1R	A	A	2R	Q2	A	0 / 2	1–2	33%
Wimbledon	A	A	A	A	A	1R	A	A	A	A	A	0 / 1	0–1	0%
US Open	A	A	A	A	A	A	A	A	1R	A	A	0 / 1	0–1	0%
Win–loss	0–0	0–0	0–0	0–0	0–0	0–3	0–0	0–0	1–2	0–0	0–0	0 / 5	1–5	17%
ATP Tour Masters 1000
Monte Carlo	A	Q1	A	A	A	A	A	A	A	A	A	0 / 0	0–0	–
Rome	A	A	A	A	A	Q1	A	A	A	A	A	0 / 0	0–0	–
Hamburg	Q2	Q1	A	A	A	Q1	A	A	A	A	A	0 / 0	0–0	–
Stuttgart	A	1R	A	A	Q1	A	Not Held					0 / 1	0–1	0%
Win–loss	0–0	0–1	0–0	0–0	0–0	0–0	0–0	0–0	0–0	0–0	0–0	0 / 1	0–1	0%

== See also ==
List of Grand Slam boys' singles champions
