= 1997 Wimbledon Championships – Girls' singles =

Girls' singles
- 1997 Wimbledon Championships

Final
- Champion: (Zimbabwe) Cara Black
- Runner-up: (United States) Brie Rippner
- Score: 6–3, 7–5

Events
Singles	men	women		boys	girls
Doubles	men	women	mixed	boys	girls
WC Singles	men	women	quad
WC Doubles	men	women	quad
Legends	men	women	seniors
← 1996 ·	Wimbledon Championships	· 1998 →

Cara Black defeated Brie Rippner in the final, 6–3, 7–5 to win the girls' singles tennis title at the 1997 Wimbledon Championships.

== Seeds ==
1. n/a
2. (Romania) Raluca Sandu (second round)
3. (Zimbabwe) Cara Black (champion)
4. (Australia) Evie Dominikovic (second round)
5. (Germany) Jasmin Wöhr (third round)
6. (United States) Brie Rippner (final)
7. (Belarus) Tatiana Poutchek (second round)
8. (Russia) Ekaterina Sysoeva (first round)
9. (South Korea) Cho Yoon-jeong (second round)
10. (Japan) Maiko Inoue (first round)
11. (Japan) Akiko Morigami (semifinals)
12. (Slovenia) Katarina Srebotnik (second round)
13. (Australia) Bryanne Stewart (semifinals)
14. (Kazakhstan) Irina Selyutina (quarterfinals)
15. (Canada) Cristina Popescu (second round)
16. (Slovakia) Andrea Šebová (second round)

Click on the seed number of a player to go to their draw section.

== Draw ==
=== Key ===
- Q = Qualifier
- WC = Wild card
- LL = Lucky loser
- Alt = Alternate
- SE = Special exempt
- PR = Protected ranking
- ITF = ITF entry
- JE = Junior exempt
- w/o = Walkover
- r = Retired
- d = Defaulted
- SR = Special ranking

=== Finals ===
Quarterfinals
(United Kingdom) Hannah Collin	1	4
6	(United States) Brie Rippner	6	6
11	(Japan) Akiko Morigami	6	6
(Hungary) Zsófia Gubacsi	3	3
14	(Kazakhstan) Irina Selyutina	0	2
3	(Zimbabwe) Cara Black	6	6
13	(Australia) Bryanne Stewart	6	5	7
(Belgium) Justine Henin	3	7	5

Semifinals
6	(United States) Brie Rippner	6	6
11	(Japan) Akiko Morigami	1	2
3	(Zimbabwe) Cara Black	7	6
13	(Australia) Bryanne Stewart	5	1

Final
6	(United States) Brie Rippner	3	5
3	(Zimbabwe) Cara Black	6	7

=== Top half ===
==== Section 1 ====
First round
(United Kingdom) Lucy Wood	1	4
(South Africa) Natalie Grandin	6	6
(Japan) Rika Fujiwara	6	6
(Slovakia) Gabriela Voleková	3	4
(United States) Sarah Taylor	2	2
(United Kingdom) Hannah Collin	6	6
(Greece) Eleni Daniilidou	5	3
12	(Slovenia) Katarina Srebotnik	7	6
9	(South Korea) Cho Yoon-jeong	3	6	6
(France) Laëtitia Sanchez	6	1	2
(Mexico) Paola Arrangoiz	4	3
(United States) Marissa Irvin	6	6
(Croatia) Dora Krstulović	5	3
(United Kingdom) Kate Elliott	7	6
(Poland) Olga Rejniak	1	3
6	(United States) Brie Rippner	6	6

Second round
(South Africa) N Grandin	6	2
(Japan) R Fujiwara	7	6
(United Kingdom) H Collin	6	6
(Slovenia) K Srebotnik	2	4
9	(South Korea) Y-j Cho	4	2
(United States) M Irvin	6	6
(United Kingdom) K Elliott	4	4
6	(United States) A Rippner	6	6

Third round
(Japan) R Fujiwara	1	4
(United Kingdom) H Collin	6	6
(United States) M Irvin	2	1
6	(United States) A Rippner	6	6

Quarterfinals
(United Kingdom) H Collin	1	4
6	(United States) A Rippner	6	6

==== Section 2 ====
First round
4	(Australia) Evie Dominikovic	6	6
(Israel) Rotem Teperberg	2	4
(United Kingdom) Chantal Coombs	0	4
(Denmark) Mette Iversen	6	6
(Venezuela) Milagros Sequera	6	7
(United Kingdom) Jheni Osman	3	6
(Indonesia) Wynne Prakusya	2	6
11	(Japan) Akiko Morigami	6	7
15	(Canada) Cristina Popescu	6	7	6
(Slovakia) Silvia Uríčková	7	6	3
(Croatia) Ivana Bračun	1	2
(Hungary) Zsófia Gubacsi	6	6
(United Kingdom) Sarah Lydon	6	0
(South Africa) Lara van Rooyen	7	6
(Colombia) Catalina Castaño	4	1
5	(Germany) Jasmin Wöhr	6	6

Second round
4	(Australia) E Dominikovic	5	4
(Denmark) M Iversen	7	6
(Venezuela) M Sequera	4	3
11	(Japan) A Morigami	6	6
15	(Canada) C Popescu	6	5	1
(Hungary) Z Gubacsi	2	7	6
(South Africa) L van Rooyen	5	1
5	(Germany) J Wöhr	7	6

Third round
(Denmark) M Iversen	4	2
11	(Japan) A Morigami	6	6
(Hungary) Z Gubacsi	6	6
(Germany) J Wöhr	1	1

Quarterfinals
11	(Japan) A Morigami	6	6
(Hungary) Z Gubacsi	3	3

=== Bottom half ===
==== Section 3 ====
First round
8	(Russia) Ekaterina Sysoeva	5	6	5
(Slovenia) Maja Matevžič	7	3	7
(United Kingdom) Louise Herbert	5	2
(France) Stéphanie Rizzi	7	6
(Croatia) Ivana Višić	6	7
(United Kingdom) Julie White	3	5
(United States) Brandis Braverman	6	2	2
14	(Kazakhstan) Irina Selyutina	4	6	6
16	(Slovakia) Andrea Šebová	7	6
(United Kingdom) Sally Turner	5	1
(Australia) Amanda Grahame	7	7
(Morocco) Bahia Mouhtassine	6	6
(Denmark) Eva Dyrberg	6	6
(South Africa) Alicia Pillay	3	3
(Thailand) Marissa Niroj	2	2
3	(Zimbabwe) Cara Black	6	6

Second round
(Slovenia) M Matevžič	6	3	2
(France) S Rizzi	2	6	6
(Croatia) I Višić	2	2
14	(Kazakhstan) I Selyutina	6	6
16	(Slovakia) A Šebová	0	6
(Australia) A Grahame	6	7
(Denmark) E Dyrberg	3	4
3	(Zimbabwe) C Black	6	6

Third round
(France) S Rizzi	6	1
14	(Kazakhstan) I Selyutina	7	6
(Australia) A Grahame	4	4
3	(Zimbabwe) C Black	6	6

Quarterfinals
14	(Kazakhstan) I Selyutina	0	2
3	(Zimbabwe) C Black	6	6

==== Section 4 ====
First round
7	(Belarus) Tatiana Poutchek	6	6
(Canada) Sanja Bajin	1	1
(France) Kildine Chevalier	6	0	3
(United Kingdom) Abigail Tordoff	2	6	6
(Italy) Laura Dell'Angelo	7	6	1
(Mexico) Paola Palencia	5	7	6
(United States) Jennifer Singian	5	4
13	(Australia) Bryanne Stewart	7	6
10	(Japan) Maiko Inoue	6	6	4
(Brazil) Bruna Colósio	7	4	6
(United States) Gabriela Lastra	6	5	3
(United Kingdom) Heidi Farr	4	7	6
(United Kingdom) Tilly Callow	2	2
(Belgium) Justine Henin	6	6
(United Kingdom) Nicola Woodhouse	1	2
2	(Romania) Raluca Sandu	6	6

Second round
7	(Belarus) T Poutchek	6	4	7
(United Kingdom) A Tordoff	2	6	9
(Mexico) P Palencia	0	6	4
13	(Australia) B Stewart	6	3	6
(Brazil) B Colósio	6	3	6
(United Kingdom) H Farr	4	6	8
(Belgium) J Henin	7	6
2	(Romania) R Sandu	5	4

Third round
(United Kingdom) A Tordoff	3	3
13	(Australia) B Stewart	6	6
(United Kingdom) H Farr	0	2
(Belgium) J Henin	6	6

Quarterfinals
13	(Australia) B Stewart	6	5	7
(Belgium) J Henin	3	7	5
