= 1997 Wimbledon Championships – Girls' doubles =

Girls' doubles
- 1997 Wimbledon Championships

Final
- Champions: (Zimbabwe) Cara Black (Kazakhstan) Irina Selyutina
- Runners-up: (Slovenia) Maja Matevžič (Slovenia) Katarina Srebotnik
- Score: 3–6, 7–5, 6–3

Events
Singles	men	women		boys	girls
Doubles	men	women	mixed	boys	girls
WC Singles	men	women	quad
WC Doubles	men	women	quad
Legends	men	women	seniors
← 1996 ·	Wimbledon Championships	· 1998 →

Cara Black and Irina Selyutina defeated Maja Matevžič and Katarina Srebotnik in the final, 3–6, 7–5, 6–3 to win the girls' doubles tennis title at the 1997 Wimbledon Championships.

== Seeds ==
1. (Zimbabwe) Cara Black / (Kazakhstan) Irina Selyutina (champions)
2. (Slovakia) Andrea Šebová / (Slovakia) Gabriela Voleková (quarterfinals)
3. (Slovenia) Maja Matevžič / (Slovenia) Katarina Srebotnik (final)
4. (United States) Marissa Irvin / (United States) Brie Rippner (semifinals)

== Draw ==
=== Key ===
- Q = Qualifier
- WC = Wild card
- LL = Lucky loser
- Alt = Alternate
- SE = Special exempt
- PR = Protected ranking
- ITF = ITF entry
- JE = Junior exempt
- w/o = Walkover
- r = Retired
- d = Defaulted
- SR = Special ranking

=== Draw ===
First round
1	(Zimbabwe) Cara Black (Kazakhstan) Irina Selyutina	6	6
(Australia) Evie Dominikovic (Australia) Bryanne Stewart	2	1
(Denmark) Eva Dyrberg (Denmark) Mette Iversen	4	6	6
(Hungary) Zsófia Gubacsi (South Africa) Alicia Pillay	6	3	2
4	(United States) Marissa Irvin (United States) Brie Rippner	6	6
(United Kingdom) Jheni Osman (Indonesia) Wynne Prakusya	2	1
(United Kingdom) Hannah Collin (United Kingdom) Abigail Tordoff	2	7	4
(United States) Sarah Taylor (Germany) Jasmin Wöhr	6	6	6
(South Korea) Cho Yoon-jeong (Thailand) Marissa Niroj	6	5
(Brazil) Bruna Colósio (Mexico) Paola Palencia	7	7
(Japan) Maiko Inoue (Japan) Akiko Morigami	4	1
3	(Slovenia) Maja Matevžič (Slovenia) Katarina Srebotnik	6	6
(France) Kildine Chevalier (Canada) Cristina Popescu	2	7	2
(Belarus) Tatiana Poutchek (Russia) Ekaterina Sysoeva	6	5	6
(Canada) Sanja Bajin (Croatia) Ivana Višić	4	4
2	(Slovakia) Andrea Šebová (Slovakia) Gabriela Voleková	6	6

Quarterfinals
1	(Zimbabwe) Cara Black (Kazakhstan) Irina Selyutina	7	6
(Denmark) Eva Dyrberg (Denmark) Mette Iversen	6	2
4	(United States) Marissa Irvin (United States) Brie Rippner	6	6
(United States) Sarah Taylor (Germany) Jasmin Wöhr	3	1
(Brazil) Bruna Colósio (Mexico) Paola Palencia	2	0
3	(Slovenia) Maja Matevžič (Slovenia) Katarina Srebotnik	6	6
(Belarus) Tatiana Poutchek (Russia) Ekaterina Sysoeva	6	7
2	(Slovakia) Andrea Šebová (Slovakia) Gabriela Voleková	2	6

Semifinals
1	(Zimbabwe) Cara Black (Kazakhstan) Irina Selyutina	6	6
4	(United States) Marissa Irvin (United States) Brie Rippner	4	3
3	(Slovenia) Maja Matevžič (Slovenia) Katarina Srebotnik	3	7	6
(Belarus) Tatiana Poutchek (Russia) Ekaterina Sysoeva	6	5	4

Final
1	(Zimbabwe) Cara Black (Kazakhstan) Irina Selyutina	3	7	6
3	(Slovenia) Maja Matevžič (Slovenia) Katarina Srebotnik	6	5	3
