= 1997 Wimbledon Championships – Women's singles =

Women's singles
- 1997 Wimbledon Championships

Final
- Champion: (Switzerland) Martina Hingis
- Runner-up: (Czech Republic) Jana Novotná
- Score: 2–6, 6–3, 6–3

Details
- Draw: 128 (8Q / 8WC)
- Seeds: 16

Events
Singles	men	women		boys	girls
Doubles	men	women	mixed	boys	girls
WC Singles	men	women	quad
WC Doubles	men	women	quad
Legends	men	women	seniors
- Wimbledon Championships

Martina Hingis defeated Jana Novotná in the final, 2–6, 6–3, 6–3 to win the ladies' singles tennis title at the 1997 Wimbledon Championships. It was her second major singles title. At 16 years and 278 days old, Hingis was the youngest player to win a Wimbledon singles title since Lottie Dod in 1887. It was Novotná's second runner-up finish at Wimbledon.

Steffi Graf was the two-time reigning champion, but did not compete due to injury.

This marked the first Wimbledon appearance of future five-time champion and world No. 1 Venus Williams. Williams lost in the first round to Magdalena Grzybowska.

== Seeds ==
1. (Switzerland) Martina Hingis (champion)
2. (United States) Monica Seles (third round)
3. (Czech Republic) Jana Novotná (final)
4. (Croatia) Iva Majoli (quarterfinals)
5. (United States) Lindsay Davenport (second round)
6. (South Africa) Amanda Coetzer (second round)
7. (Germany) Anke Huber (third round)
8. (Spain) Arantxa Sánchez Vicario (semifinals)
9. (France) Mary Pierce (fourth round)
10. (Spain) Conchita Martínez (third round)
11. (United States) Mary Joe Fernández (fourth round)
12. (Romania) Irina Spîrlea (fourth round)
13. (United States) Kimberly Po (first round)
14. (Netherlands) Brenda Schultz-McCarthy (third round)
15. (Romania) Ruxandra Dragomir (first round)
16. (Austria) Barbara Paulus (second round)

Click on the seed number of a player to go to their draw section.

== Draw ==
Key

- Q = Qualifier
- WC = Wild card
- LL = Lucky loser
- Alt = Alternate
- ITF = ITF entry
- PR = Protected ranking
- SR = Special ranking
- SE = Special exempt
- JE = Junior exempt
- JR = Junior Accelerator Programme entrant
- CO = College Accelerator Programme entrant
- NG = Next Gen Accelerator Program entrant
- w/o = Walkover
- r = Retired
- d = Defaulted

=== Finals ===
Quarterfinals
1	(Switzerland) Martina Hingis	6	6
(Czech Republic) Denisa Chládková	3	2
4	(Croatia) Iva Majoli	6^{1}	4
(Russia) Anna Kournikova	7^{7}	6
3	(Czech Republic) Jana Novotná	6	6
(Indonesia) Yayuk Basuki	3	3
8	(Spain) Arantxa Sánchez Vicario	6	7
(France) Nathalie Tauziat	2	5

Semifinals
1	(Switzerland) Martina Hingis	6	6
(Russia) Anna Kournikova	3	2
3	(Czech Republic) Jana Novotná	6	6
8	(Spain) Arantxa Sánchez Vicario	4	2

Final
1	(Switzerland) Martina Hingis	2	6	6
3	(Czech Republic) Jana Novotná	6	3	3

=== Top half ===
==== Section 1 ====
First round
1	(Switzerland) M Hingis	6	6
Q	(Luxembourg) A Kremer	4	4
(Germany) P Begerow	3	3
(Belarus) O Barabanschikova	6	6
(Czech Republic) E Martincová	4	2
(United States) L Raymond	6	6
(United States) N Arendt	6	6
(Czech Republic) P Langrová	2	0
Q	(Italy) L Golarsa	6	4	6
(France) A Dechaume-Balleret	1	6	3
(Belgium) S Appelmans	6	3	6
(Canada) R Simpson	2	6	0
(United States) S Cacic	5	4
(United States) A Frazier	7	6
(Italy) S Farina	6	3	2
14	(Netherlands) B Schultz-McCarthy	4	6	6

Second round
1	(Switzerland) M Hingis	6	6
(Belarus) O Barabanschikova	2	2
(United States) L Raymond	6	4	3
(United States) N Arendt	1	6	6
Q	(Italy) L Golarsa	2	0
(Belgium) S Appelmans	6	6
(United States) A Frazier	6^{3}	3
14	(Netherlands) B Schultz-McCarthy	7^{7}	6

Third round
1	(Switzerland) M Hingis	6	6
(United States) N Arendt	1	3
(Belgium) S Appelmans	6	6
14	(Netherlands) B Schultz-McCarthy	2	3

Fourth round
1	(Switzerland) M Hingis	6	6
(Belgium) S Appelmans	1	3

==== Section 2 ====
First round
15	(Romania) R Dragomir	7	2	8
(Germany) A Glass	5	6	10
(Australia) A Ellwood	5	1
Q	(Venezuela) M Vento	7	6
(United States) G Helgeson-Nielsen	6	6
WC	(United Kingdom) L Ahl	2	4
(Bulgaria) M Maleeva	6	6
WC	(United Kingdom) J Pullin	1	3
(Slovakia) K Studeníková	3	6	3
Q	(Australia) N Pratt	6	4	6
(Slovakia) R Zrubáková	6	7
Q	(Belgium) N Feber	1	5
(Czech Republic) D Chládková	7^{7}	6
(Czech Republic) S Kleinová	6^{5}	4
(United States) T Whitlinger-Jones	7	2	2
5	(United States) L Davenport	5	6	6

Second round
(Germany) A Glass	1^{r}
Q	(Venezuela) M Vento	2
(United States) G Helgeson-Nielsen	5	5
(Bulgaria) M Maleeva	7	7
Q	(Australia) N Pratt	4	5
(Slovakia) R Zrubáková	6	7
(Czech Republic) D Chládková	7	6
5	(United States) L Davenport	5	2

Third round
Q	(Venezuela) M Vento	6	7
(Bulgaria) M Maleeva	2	5
(Slovakia) R Zrubáková	7^{7}	3	6
(Czech Republic) D Chládková	6^{3}	6	8

Fourth round
Q	(Venezuela) M Vento	1	3
(Czech Republic) D Chládková	6	6

==== Section 3 ====
First round
4	(Croatia) I Majoli	2	6	6
(Argentina) M Díaz Oliva	6	0	3
(Austria) M Maruska	7^{7}	6
(Czech Republic) A Gerši	6^{4}	2
Q	(United Kingdom) K Cross	6	6
(United States) L Wild	4	2
(Italy) F Perfetti	4	4
(Spain) M Sánchez Lorenzo	6	6
WC	(United States) G Fernández	7^{7}	6
(Netherlands) M Oremans	6^{5}	3
(France) N Dechy	6^{6}	6	6
(Belgium) L Courtois	7^{8}	1	2
(Russia) E Makarova	6	4	6
(Russia) T Panova	4	6	3
(Slovakia) H Nagyová	1	0
12	(Romania) I Spîrlea	6	6

Second round
4	(Croatia) I Majoli	6	6
(Austria) M Maruska	3	3
Q	(United Kingdom) K Cross	6	6
(Spain) M Sánchez Lorenzo	4	0
WC	(United States) G Fernández	6	4	6
(France) N Dechy	3	6	3
(Russia) E Makarova	6	1	8
12	(Romania) I Spîrlea	4	6	10

Third round
4	(Croatia) I Majoli	4	7^{7}	6
Q	(United Kingdom) K Cross	6	6^{2}	4
WC	(United States) G Fernández	3	1
12	(Romania) I Spîrlea	6	6

Fourth round
4	(Croatia) I Majoli	6^{8}	6	9
12	(Romania) I Spîrlea	7^{10}	1	7

==== Section 4 ====
First round
10	(Spain) C Martínez	6	6
(Slovakia) K Habšudová	1	2
(Japan) Y Yoshida	6	6
(Japan) R Hiraki	2	3
(Czech Republic) H Suková	7^{7}	6
WC	(United Kingdom) S-A Siddall	6^{4}	1
(Chinese Taipei) S-t Wang	6	2	7
(United States) L McNeil	1	6	5
(United States) C Rubin	1	1
(Russia) A Kournikova	6	6
(France) A-G Sidot	6^{6}	4
(Germany) B Rittner	7^{8}	6
(South Africa) J Kruger	7^{7}	6
(Belgium) S Devillé	6^{3}	3
Q	(Japan) H Inoue	3	3
7	(Germany) A Huber	6	6

Second round
10	(Spain) C Martínez	6	6
(Japan) Y Yoshida	0	0
(Czech Republic) H Suková	6	6
(Chinese Taipei) S-t Wang	0	3
(Russia) A Kournikova	4	7^{9}	6
(Germany) B Rittner	6	6^{7}	3
(South Africa) J Kruger	2	0
7	(Germany) A Huber	6	6

Third round
10	(Spain) C Martínez	4	2
(Czech Republic) H Suková	6	6
(Russia) A Kournikova	3	6	6
7	(Germany) A Huber	6	4	4

Fourth round
(Czech Republic) H Suková	6	2	3
(Russia) A Kournikova	2	6	6

=== Bottom half ===
==== Section 5 ====
First round
6	(South Africa) A Coetzer	7^{12}	6
(France) A Fusai	6^{10}	1
(Japan) M Saeki	2	6	2
(Canada) P Hy-Boulais	6	1	6
(United States) V Williams	6	2	4
(Poland) M Grzybowska	4	6	6
(Austria) B Schett	2	6	6
(Sweden) Å Carlsson	6	3	0
(Japan) A Sugiyama	3	0
(Indonesia) Y Basuki	6	6
(United States) M Tu	0	3
(Argentina) I Gorrochategui	6	6
(Latvia) L Neiland	5	2
(Japan) N Kijimuta	7	6
(Netherlands) K Boogert	3	6	3
16	(Austria) B Paulus	6	1	6

Second round
6	(South Africa) A Coetzer	2	1
(Canada) P Hy-Boulais	6	6
(Poland) M Grzybowska	4	6	6
(Austria) B Schett	6	3	2
(Indonesia) Y Basuki	6	6
(Argentina) I Gorrochategui	2	0
(Japan) N Kijimuta	5	6	6
16	(Austria) B Paulus	7	3	3

Third round
(Canada) P Hy-Boulais	6	6
(Poland) M Grzybowska	4	1
(Indonesia) Y Basuki	6	6
(Japan) N Kijimuta	3	2

Fourth round
(Canada) P Hy-Boulais	0	6^{2}
(Indonesia) Y Basuki	6	7^{7}

==== Section 6 ====
First round
11	(United States) MJ Fernández	6	6
(France) N van Lottum	2	2
(Poland) A Olsza	3	6	6
(Czech Republic) L Němečková	6	1	2
(Japan) N Sawamatsu	6	6
WC	(United Kingdom) S Smith	1	3
(Czech Republic) L Richterová	3	1
(Thailand) T Tanasugarn	6	6
(Japan) M Endo	3	3
(Spain) G León García	6	6
(Spain) C Torrens Valero	1	6	6
(Italy) G Pizzichini	6	3	4
(Belarus) N Zvereva	2	2
(Russia) E Likhovtseva	6	6
(Germany) W Probst	4	6	0
3	(Czech Republic) J Novotná	6	4	6

Second round
11	(United States) MJ Fernández	6	6
(Poland) A Olsza	4	0
(Japan) N Sawamatsu	2	2
(Thailand) T Tanasugarn	6	6
(Spain) G León García	3	6	6
(Spain) C Torrens Valero	6	2	3
(Russia) E Likhovtseva	1	6	4
3	(Czech Republic) J Novotná	6	4	6

Third round
11	(United States) MJ Fernández	6	6
(Thailand) T Tanasugarn	2	4
(Spain) G León García	4	2
3	(Czech Republic) J Novotná	6	6

Fourth round
11	(United States) MJ Fernández	7	4	5
3	(Czech Republic) J Novotná	5	6	7

==== Section 7 ====
First round
8	(Spain) A Sánchez Vicario	6	6
WC	(United Kingdom) C Wood	0	0
(Switzerland) E Gagliardi	3	7	6
(Romania) C Cristea	6	5	1
(Argentina) F Labat	6	6
(Italy) R Grande	4	4
(Belgium) E Callens	6	6
(Argentina) P Suárez	4	2
(Italy) F Lubiani	3	6	1
(France) S Pitkowski	6	4	6
(United States) J Watanabe	3	1
(Spain) M Serna	6	6
(Spain) V Ruano Pascual	6	6
(Austria) S Dopfer	2	2
(Belgium) D Van Roost	3	4
9	(France) M Pierce	6	6

Second round
8	(Spain) A Sánchez Vicario	6	6
(Switzerland) E Gagliardi	4	2
(Argentina) F Labat	6	6
(Belgium) E Callens	2	3
(France) S Pitkowski	2	0
(Spain) M Serna	6	6
(Spain) V Ruano Pascual	0	6	3
9	(France) M Pierce	6	2	6

Third round
8	(Spain) A Sánchez Vicario	6	6
(Argentina) F Labat	1	2
(Spain) M Serna	4	3
9	(France) M Pierce	6	6

Fourth round
8	(Spain) A Sánchez Vicario	6	6
9	(France) M Pierce	1	3

==== Section 8 ====
First round
13	(United States) K Po	6	5	2
(Australia) K-A Guse	3	7	6
(France) N Tauziat	6	6
LL	(Japan) N Miyagi	3	4
WC	(United Kingdom) L Woodroffe	6	6
(Switzerland) P Schnyder	4	4
(Austria) J Wiesner	7	6
(Germany) J Kandarr	5	2
(United States) C Morariu	6	6
WC	(United Kingdom) C Taylor	2	1
Q	(Germany) M Schnitzer	3	0
(France) S Testud	6	6
(United States) A Grossman	2	6^{5}
(United States) K Brandi	6	7^{7}
(Australia) R McQuillan	0	2
2	(United States) M Seles	6	6

Second round
(Australia) K-A Guse	0	3
(France) N Tauziat	6	6
WC	(United Kingdom) L Woodroffe	2	3
(Austria) J Wiesner	6	6
(United States) C Morariu	7^{7}	3	1
(France) S Testud	6^{5}	6	6
(United States) K Brandi	7	3	3
2	(United States) M Seles	5	6	6

Third round
(France) N Tauziat	3	6	6
(Austria) J Wiesner	6	3	2
(France) S Testud	0	6	8
2	(United States) M Seles	6	4	6

Fourth round
(France) N Tauziat	4	7	12
(France) S Testud	6	5	10

Preceded by 1997 French Open – Women's singles	Grand Slam women's singles	Succeeded by 1997 US Open – Women's singles
