= 1997 Wimbledon Championships =

- Date: 23 June – 6 July
- Edition: 111th
- Category: Grand Slam (ITF)
- Draw: 128S/64D/64XD
- Prize money: £6,884,952
- Surface: Grass
- Location: Church Road; SW19, Wimbledon, London, United Kingdom
- Venue: All England Lawn Tennis and Croquet Club

Champions

Men's singles
- (United States) Pete Sampras

Women's singles
- (Switzerland) Martina Hingis

Men's doubles
- (Australia) Todd Woodbridge / (Australia) Mark Woodforde

Women's doubles
- (United States) Gigi Fernández / (Belarus) Natasha Zvereva

Mixed doubles
- (Czech Republic) Cyril Suk / (Czech Republic) Helena Suková

Boys' singles
- (South Africa) Wesley Whitehouse

Girls' singles
- (Zimbabwe) Cara Black

Boys' doubles
- (Peru) Luis Horna / (Chile) Nicolás Massú

Girls' doubles
- (Zimbabwe) Cara Black / (Kazakhstan) Irina Selyutina
← 1996 ·	Wimbledon Championships	· 1998 →

The 1997 Wimbledon Championships was a tennis tournament played on grass courts at the All England Lawn Tennis and Croquet Club in Wimbledon, London in the United Kingdom. It was the 111th edition of the Wimbledon Championships and was held from 23 June to 6 July 1997.

The championships saw the inauguration of a new No. 1 Court, the third court to be named such in the club's history. To commemorate the new stadium, all the three-time or more singles champions were invited to a ceremony marking the opening of the new court and were presented with a silver salver. Ten of the thirteen surviving eligible champions attended: Louise Brough, Rod Laver, Margaret Court, Billie Jean King, John Newcombe, Chris Evert, Martina Navratilova, John McEnroe, Boris Becker and Pete Sampras. The only surviving absentees were Maria Bueno and Björn Borg who declined to attend and Steffi Graf who was recovering from knee surgery and unable to be present. The first match played on the new court was between Tim Henman and Daniel Nestor.

For only the second time in the tournament history (after the 1991 edition), Wimbledon saw play during the Middle Sunday, after 3 days of suspension due to rain.

== Prize money ==
The total prize money for 1997 championships was £6,884,952. The winner of the men's title earned £415,000 while the women's singles champion earned £373,500.

Event	W	F	SF	QF	Round of 16	Round of 32	Round of 64	Round of 128
Men's singles	£415,000							
Women's singles	£373,500							
Men's doubles *	£170,030							—
Women's doubles *	£147,010							—
Mixed doubles *	£72,200							—

_{* per team}

== Champions ==
=== Seniors ===
==== Men's singles ====
(United States) Pete Sampras defeated (France) Cédric Pioline, 6–4, 6–2, 6–4

- It was Sampras' 10th career Grand Slam singles title and his 4th title at Wimbledon.

==== Women's singles ====
(Switzerland) Martina Hingis defeated (Czech Republic) Jana Novotná, 2–6, 6–3, 6–3

- It was Hingis' 2nd career Grand Slam singles title and her 1st and only title at Wimbledon.

==== Men's doubles ====
(Australia) Todd Woodbridge / (Australia) Mark Woodforde defeated (Netherlands) Jacco Eltingh / (Netherlands) Paul Haarhuis, 7–6^{(7–4)}, 7–6^{(9–7)}, 5–7, 6–3

- It was Woodbridge's 14th career Grand Slam doubles title and his 6th title at Wimbledon. It was Woodforde's 15th career Grand Slam doubles title and his 6th title at Wimbledon.

==== Women's doubles ====
(United States) Gigi Fernández / (Belarus) Natasha Zvereva defeated (United States) Nicole Arendt / (Netherlands) Manon Bollegraf, 7–6^{(7–4)}, 6–4

- It was Fernández's 17th and last career Grand Slam doubles title and her 4th title at Wimbledon. It was Zvereva's 18th and last career Grand Slam doubles title and her 5th title at Wimbledon.

==== Mixed doubles ====
(Czech Republic) Cyril Suk / (Czech Republic) Helena Suková defeated (Russia) Andrei Olhovskiy / (Latvia) Larisa Neiland, 4–6, 6–3, 6–4

- It was Suk's 4th and last career Grand Slam mixed doubles title and his 3rd title at Wimbledon. It was Suková's 5th and last career Grand Slam mixed doubles title and her 3rd title at Wimbledon.

=== Juniors ===
==== Boys' singles ====
(South Africa) Wesley Whitehouse defeated (Germany) Daniel Elsner, 6–3, 7–6^{(8–6)}

==== Girls' singles ====
(Zimbabwe) Cara Black defeated (United States) Brie Rippner, 6–3, 7–5

==== Boys' doubles ====
(Peru) Luis Horna / (Chile) Nicolás Massú defeated (South Africa) Jaco van der Westhuizen / (South Africa) Wesley Whitehouse, 6–4, 6–2

==== Girls' doubles ====
(Zimbabwe) Cara Black / (Kazakhstan) Irina Selyutina defeated (Slovenia) Maja Matevžič / (Slovenia) Katarina Srebotnik, 3–6, 7–5, 6–3

== Singles seeds ==
=== Men's singles ===
1. (United States) Pete Sampras (champion)
2. (Croatia) Goran Ivanišević (second round, lost to Magnus Norman)
3. (Russia) Yevgeny Kafelnikov (first round, lost to Nicolas Kiefer)
4. (Netherlands) Richard Krajicek (fourth round, lost to Tim Henman)
5. (United States) Michael Chang (first round, lost to Todd Woodbridge)
6. (Austria) Thomas Muster (withdrew before the tournament began)
7. (Australia) Mark Philippoussis (first round, lost to Greg Rusedski)
8. (Germany) Boris Becker (quarterfinals, lost to Pete Sampras)
9. (Chile) Marcelo Ríos (fourth round, lost to Boris Becker)
10. (Spain) Carlos Moyá (second round, lost to Boris Becker)
11. (Brazil) Gustavo Kuerten (first round, lost to Justin Gimelstob)
12. (Australia) Patrick Rafter (fourth round, lost to Todd Woodbridge)
13. (Ukraine) Andriy Medvedev (third round, lost to Nicolas Kiefer)
14. (United Kingdom) Tim Henman (quarterfinals, lost to Michael Stich)
15. (South Africa) Wayne Ferreira (third round, lost to Cédric Pioline)
16. (Czech Republic) Petr Korda (fourth round, lost to Pete Sampras)
17. (Sweden) Jonas Björkman (first round, lost to Chris Wilkinson)

=== Women's singles ===
1. (Switzerland) Martina Hingis (champion)
2. (United States) Monica Seles (third round, lost to Sandrine Testud)
3. (Czech Republic) Jana Novotná (final, lost to Martina Hingis)
4. (Croatia) Iva Majoli (quarterfinals, lost to Anna Kournikova)
5. (United States) Lindsay Davenport (second round, lost to Denisa Chládková)
6. (South Africa) Amanda Coetzer (second round, lost to Patricia Hy-Boulais)
7. (Germany) Anke Huber (third round, lost to Anna Kournikova)
8. (Spain) Arantxa Sánchez Vicario (semifinals, lost to Jana Novotná)
9. (France) Mary Pierce (fourth round, lost to Arantxa Sánchez Vicario)
10. (Spain) Conchita Martínez (third round, lost to Helena Suková)
11. (United States) Mary Joe Fernández (fourth round, lost to Jana Novotná)
12. (Romania) Irina Spîrlea (fourth round, lost to Iva Majoli)
13. (United States) Kimberly Po (first round, lost to Kerry-Anne Guse)
14. (Netherlands) Brenda Schultz-McCarthy (third round, lost to Sabine Appelmans)
15. (Romania) Ruxandra Dragomir (first round, lost to Andrea Glass)
16. (Austria) Barbara Paulus (second round, lost to Naoko Kijimuta)

Preceded by 1997 French Open	Grand Slams	Succeeded by 1997 U.S. Open
