= 1997 Wimbledon Championships – Men's doubles =

Men's doubles
- 1997 Wimbledon Championships

Final
- Champions: (Australia) Todd Woodbridge (Australia) Mark Woodforde
- Runners-up: (Netherlands) Jacco Eltingh (Netherlands) Paul Haarhuis
- Score: 7–6^{(7–4)}, 7–6^{(9–7)}, 5–7, 6–3

Details
- Draw: 64 (3 Q / 6 WC )
- Seeds: 16

Events
Singles	men	women		boys	girls
Doubles	men	women	mixed	boys	girls
WC Singles	men	women	quad
WC Doubles	men	women	quad
Legends	men	women	seniors
← 1996 ·	Wimbledon Championships	· 1998 →

Four-time defending champions Todd Woodbridge and Mark Woodforde defeated Jacco Eltingh and Paul Haarhuis in the final, 7–6^{(7–4)}, 7–6^{(9–7)}, 5–7, 6–3 to win the gentlemen's doubles tennis title at the 1997 Wimbledon Championships. It was their fifth Wimbledon title and ninth major title overall.

== Seeds ==
1. (Australia) Todd Woodbridge / (Australia) Mark Woodforde (champions)
2. (Netherlands) Jacco Eltingh / (Netherlands) Paul Haarhuis (final)
3. (Russia) Yevgeny Kafelnikov / (Czech Republic) Daniel Vacek (first round)
4. (The Bahamas) Mark Knowles / (Canada) Daniel Nestor (third round)
5. (Canada) Sébastien Lareau / (United States) Alex O'Brien (first round)
6. (South Africa) Ellis Ferreira / (United States) Patrick Galbraith (third round)
7. (Australia) Mark Philippoussis / (Australia) Patrick Rafter (quarterfinals)
8. (United States) Rick Leach / (United States) Jonathan Stark (third round)
9. (Sweden) Jonas Björkman / (Sweden) Nicklas Kulti (quarterfinals)
10. (Australia) Sandon Stolle / (Czech Republic) Cyril Suk (third round)
11. (United Kingdom) Neil Broad / (South Africa) Piet Norval (quarterfinals)
12. (United States) Donald Johnson / (United States) Francisco Montana (quarterfinals)
13. (Czech Republic) Martin Damm / (Czech Republic) Pavel Vízner (semifinals)
14. (Belgium) Libor Pimek / (South Africa) Byron Talbot (first round)
15. (Canada) Grant Connell / (United States) Scott Davis (second round)
16. (Australia) Joshua Eagle / (Australia) Andrew Florent (first round)

Click on the seed number of a player to go to their draw section.

== Draw ==
=== Key ===
- Q = Qualifier
- WC = Wild card
- LL = Lucky loser
- Alt = Alternate
- ITF = ITF entry
- PR = Protected ranking
- SR = Special ranking
- SE = Special exempt
- JE = Junior exempt
- JR = Junior Accelerator Programme entrant
- CO = College Accelerator Programme entrant
- NG = Next Gen Accelerator Program entrant
- w/o = Walkover
- r = Retired
- d = Defaulted

=== Finals ===
Quarterfinals
1	(Australia) Todd Woodbridge (Australia) Mark Woodforde	2	6	6	6
9	(Sweden) Jonas Björkman (Sweden) Nicklas Kulti	6	2	3	4
(Zimbabwe) Wayne Black (United States) Jim Grabb	6	6	6
12	(United States) Donald Johnson (United States) Francisco Montana	4	1	2
11	(United Kingdom) Neil Broad (South Africa) Piet Norval	6	6	6^{3}	4	4
13	(Czech Republic) Martin Damm (Czech Republic) Pavel Vízner	4	4	7^{7}	6	6
7	(Australia) Mark Philippoussis (Australia) Patrick Rafter	6	5	6	3	8
2	(Netherlands) Jacco Eltingh (Netherlands) Paul Haarhuis	4	7	3	6	10

Semifinals
1	(Australia) Todd Woodbridge (Australia) Mark Woodforde	7^{7}	6	3	6
(Zimbabwe) Wayne Black (United States) Jim Grabb	6^{3}	4	6	3
13	(Czech Republic) Martin Damm (Czech Republic) Pavel Vízner	2	2	4
2	(Netherlands) Jacco Eltingh (Netherlands) Paul Haarhuis	6	6	6

Final
1	(Australia) Todd Woodbridge (Australia) Mark Woodforde	7^{7}	7^{9}	5	6
2	(Netherlands) Jacco Eltingh (Netherlands) Paul Haarhuis	6^{4}	6^{7}	7	3

=== Top half ===
==== Section 1 ====
First round
1	(Australia) T Woodbridge (Australia) M Woodforde	6	6
(Venezuela) N Pereira (South Africa) C van Rensburg	1	4
(United States) B MacPhie (South Africa) G Muller	7^{7}	6
WC	(United Kingdom) M Petchey (United Kingdom) A Richardson	6^{3}	3
(Sweden) R Bergh (Sweden) D Ekerot	4	5
(Germany) J Knippschild (United States) J Tarango	6	7
(Sweden) P Nyborg (Argentina) D Orsanic	5	7	3
15	(Canada) G Connell (United States) S Davis	7	5	6
9	(Sweden) J Björkman (Sweden) N Kulti	7^{8}	6
WC	(Netherlands) J Siemerink (Australia) J Stoltenberg	6^{6}	3
(Zimbabwe) B Black (United States) J Gimelstob	6	5	6
(United States) K Jones (United States) S Melville	4	7	2
(United States) K Kinnear (North Macedonia) A Kitinov	7^{7}	6^{6}	14
(Germany) P Baur (Germany) M-K Goellner	6^{5}	7^{8}	12
(France) J-P Fleurian (France) G Forget	4	3
8	(United States) R Leach (United States) J Stark	6	6

Second round
1	(Australia) T Woodbridge (Australia) M Woodforde	6	6
(United States) B MacPhie (South Africa) G Muller	4	2
(Germany) J Knippschild (United States) J Tarango	6	6^{5}	6
15	(Canada) G Connell (United States) S Davis	4	7^{7}	3
9	(Sweden) J Björkman (Sweden) N Kulti	6	6
(Zimbabwe) B Black (United States) J Gimelstob	2	1
(United States) K Kinnear (North Macedonia) A Kitinov	3	6^{3}
8	(United States) R Leach (United States) J Stark	6	7^{7}

Third round
1	(Australia) T Woodbridge (Australia) M Woodforde	7	6
(Germany) J Knippschild (United States) J Tarango	5	4
9	(Sweden) J Björkman (Sweden) N Kulti	6	3	6
8	(United States) R Leach (United States) J Stark	2	6	3

Quarterfinals
1	(Australia) T Woodbridge (Australia) M Woodforde	2	6	6	6
9	(Sweden) J Björkman (Sweden) N Kulti	6	2	3	4

==== Section 2 ====
First round
3	(Russia) Y Kafelnikov (Czech Republic) D Vacek	2	6^{5}
(Spain) E Sánchez (France) F Santoro	6	7^{7}
LL	(France) R Lavergne (France) S Simian	1	4
(Zimbabwe) W Black (United States) J Grabb	6	6
(Portugal) J Cunha e Silva (Portugal) N Marques	7^{7}	3	5
(Argentina) P Albano (Czech Republic) C Doseděl	6^{5}	6	7
LL	(United States) B Behrens (South Africa) C Haggard	4	6	14
14	(Belgium) L Pimek (South Africa) B Talbot	6	3	12
12	(United States) D Johnson (United States) F Montana	3	6	6
(Australia) P Cash (United States) R Reneberg	6	3	4
(South Africa) J-L de Jager (Netherlands) T Nijssen	7^{7}	6
WC	(United Kingdom) D Sapsford (United Kingdom) C Wilkinson	6^{4}	4
(Czech Republic) J Novák (Czech Republic) D Rikl	7	6
(United States) M Keil (United States) J Salzenstein	5	3
(Netherlands) S Noteboom (Netherlands) F Wibier	7^{7}	3	6
5	(Canada) S Lareau (United States) A O'Brien	6^{5}	6	4

Second round
(Spain) E Sánchez (France) F Santoro	5	4
(Zimbabwe) W Black (United States) J Grabb	7	6
(Argentina) P Albano (Czech Republic) C Doseděl	6^{4}	7^{7}	4
LL	(United States) B Behrens (South Africa) C Haggard	7^{7}	6^{5}	6
12	(United States) D Johnson (United States) F Montana	6	6^{3}	6
(South Africa) J-L de Jager (Netherlands) T Nijssen	2	7^{7}	2
(Czech Republic) J Novák (Czech Republic) D Rikl	3	6	5
(Netherlands) S Noteboom (Netherlands) F Wibier	6	3	7

Third round
(Zimbabwe) W Black (United States) J Grabb	7	6
LL	(United States) B Behrens (South Africa) C Haggard	5	1
12	(United States) D Johnson (United States) F Montana	6	6
(Netherlands) S Noteboom (Netherlands) F Wibier	4	4

Quarterfinals
(Zimbabwe) W Black (United States) J Grabb	6	6	6
12	(United States) D Johnson (United States) F Montana	4	1	2

=== Bottom half ===
==== Section 3 ====
First round
6	(South Africa) E Ferreira (United States) P Galbraith	6	6
(United States) TJ Middleton (United States) C Woodruff	4	4
WC	(United Kingdom) J Delgado (United Kingdom) A Foster	6	5	1
(Russia) A Olhovskiy (New Zealand) B Steven	4	7	6
(India) M Bhupathi (India) L Paes	4	6	3
(Italy) C Brandi (Italy) F Messori	6	3	6
Q	(Australia) B Ellwood (Australia) P Tramacchi	4	7	7
11	(United Kingdom) N Broad (South Africa) P Norval	6	5	9
13	(Czech Republic) M Damm (Czech Republic) P Vízner	7^{7}	6
(South Africa) D Adams (South Africa) M Barnard	6^{4}	4
WC	(United Kingdom) B Cowan (United Kingdom) N Weal	4	6^{5}
(Portugal) E Couto (Portugal) B Mota	6	7^{7}
(South Africa) B Haygarth (United States) G Van Emburgh	7^{7}	6
(France) O Delaître (France) G Raoux	6^{5}	2
(Netherlands) T Kempers (Netherlands) M Oosting	3	4
4	(The Bahamas) M Knowles (Canada) D Nestor	6	6

Second round
6	(South Africa) E Ferreira (United States) P Galbraith	6	6
(Russia) A Olhovskiy (New Zealand) B Steven	3	3
(Italy) C Brandi (Italy) F Messori	6^{5}	1
11	(United Kingdom) N Broad (South Africa) P Norval	7^{7}	6
13	(Czech Republic) M Damm (Czech Republic) P Vízner	6	7^{7}
(Portugal) E Couto (Portugal) B Mota	4	6^{5}
(South Africa) B Haygarth (United States) G Van Emburgh	7	1	4
4	(The Bahamas) M Knowles (Canada) D Nestor	5	6	6

Third round
6	(South Africa) E Ferreira (United States) P Galbraith	6^{5}	6^{4}
11	(United Kingdom) N Broad (South Africa) P Norval	7^{7}	7^{7}
13	(Czech Republic) M Damm (Czech Republic) P Vízner	6	6
4	(The Bahamas) M Knowles (Canada) D Nestor	4	4

Quarterfinals
11	(United Kingdom) N Broad (South Africa) P Norval	6	6	6^{3}	4	4
13	(Czech Republic) M Damm (Czech Republic) P Vízner	4	4	7^{7}	6	6

==== Section 4 ====
First round
7	(Australia) M Philippoussis (Australia) P Rafter	4	6	6
(United States) L Jensen (United States) M Jensen	6	3	4
WC	(United Kingdom) M Lee (United Kingdom) J Trotman	4	6	3
LL	(Sweden) H Holm (Sweden) N Holm	6	3	6
Q	(South Africa) R Koenig (United States) A Rueb	1	4
(United States) T Kronemann (Australia) D Macpherson	6	6
Q	(United States) D DiLucia (The Bahamas) R Smith	0	6	4
10	(Australia) S Stolle (Czech Republic) C Suk	6	3	6
16	(Australia) J Eagle (Australia) A Florent	6^{5}	2
(United States) D Randall (United States) J Waite	7^{7}	6
(Australia) W Arthurs (Australia) A Kratzmann	6^{5}	4
(Netherlands) S Groen (Croatia) S Hiršzon	7^{7}	6
(Belarus) M Mirnyi (South Africa) K Ullyett	3	4
(South Africa) M Ondruska (South Africa) G Stafford	6	6
(Australia) P Kilderry (Australia) M Tebbutt	6^{4}	6^{2}
2	(Netherlands) J Eltingh (Netherlands) P Haarhuis	7^{7}	7^{7}

Second round
7	(Australia) M Philippoussis (Australia) P Rafter	6	6
LL	(Sweden) H Holm (Sweden) N Holm	3	4
(United States) T Kronemann (Australia) D Macpherson	3	4
10	(Australia) S Stolle (Czech Republic) C Suk	6	6
(United States) D Randall (United States) J Waite	7^{9}	4	2
(Netherlands) S Groen (Croatia) S Hiršzon	6^{7}	6	6
(South Africa) Marcos Ondruska (South Africa) Grant Stafford	4	3
2	(Netherlands) J Eltingh (Netherlands) P Haarhuis	6	6

Third round
7	(Australia) M Philippoussis (Australia) P Rafter	6	7^{7}
10	(Australia) S Stolle (Czech Republic) C Suk	4	6^{4}
(Netherlands) S Groen (Croatia) S Hiršzon	6^{4}	4
2	(Netherlands) J Eltingh (Netherlands) P Haarhuis	7^{7}	6

Quarterfinals
7	(Australia) M Philippoussis (Australia) P Rafter	6	5	6	3	8
2	(Netherlands) J Eltingh (Netherlands) P Haarhuis	4	7	3	6	10
