= 1997 Wimbledon Championships – Mixed doubles =

Mixed doubles
- 1997 Wimbledon Championships

Final
- Champions: (Czech Republic) Cyril Suk (Czech Republic) Helena Suková
- Runners-up: (Russia) Andrei Olhovskiy (Latvia) Larisa Neiland
- Score: 4–6, 6–3, 6–4

Details
- Draw: 64 (4 WC )
- Seeds: 16

Events
Singles	men	women		boys	girls
Doubles	men	women	mixed	boys	girls
WC Singles	men	women	quad
WC Doubles	men	women	quad
Legends	men	women	seniors
← 1996 ·	Wimbledon Championships	· 1998 →

Defending champions Cyril Suk and Helena Suková defeated Andrei Olhovskiy and Larisa Neiland in the final, 4–6, 6–3, 6–4 to win the mixed doubles tennis title at the 1997 Wimbledon Championships.

== Seeds ==
1. (Canada) Grant Connell / (United States) Lindsay Davenport (semifinals)
2. (United States) Patrick Galbraith / (United States) Lisa Raymond (second round)
3. (Russia) Andrei Olhovskiy / (Latvia) Larisa Neiland (final)
4. (Czech Republic) Cyril Suk / (Czech Republic) Helena Suková (champions)
5. (United States) Rick Leach / (Netherlands) Manon Bollegraf (quarterfinals)
6. (Australia) Sandon Stolle / (United States) Mary Joe Fernández (second round)
7. (South Africa) David Adams / (France) Alexandra Fusai (third round)
8. (The Bahamas) Mark Knowles / (Russia) Anna Kournikova (second round, withdrew)
9. (Australia) Joshua Eagle / (Netherlands) Caroline Vis (first round)
10. (United States) Donald Johnson / (United States) Linda Wild (second round)
11. (Belgium) Libor Pimek / (Belgium) Sabine Appelmans (first round)
12. (United States) Jim Grabb / (United States) Debbie Graham (first round)
13. (United States) Luke Jensen / (United States) Katrina Adams (second round)
14. (Argentina) Pablo Albano / (Argentina) Mercedes Paz (second round)
15. (India) Mahesh Bhupathi / (Japan) Rika Hiraki (third round)
16. (United States) Alex O'Brien / (United States) Corina Morariu (second round)

Click on the seed number of a player to go to their draw section.

== Draw ==
=== Key ===
- Q = Qualifier
- WC = Wild card
- LL = Lucky loser
- Alt = Alternate
- SE = Special exempt
- PR = Protected ranking
- ITF = ITF entry
- JE = Junior exempt
- w/o = Walkover
- r = Retired
- d = Defaulted
- SR = Special ranking

=== Finals ===
Quarterfinals
1	(Canada) Grant Connell (United States) Lindsay Davenport	6	6
5	(United States) Rick Leach (Netherlands) Manon Bollegraf	4	4
4	(Czech Republic) Cyril Suk (Czech Republic) Helena Suková	6	0	6
(Netherlands) Tom Nijssen (Indonesia) Yayuk Basuki	1	6	4
(India) Leander Paes (Romania) Ruxandra Dragomir	3	6^{5}
3	(Russia) Andrei Olhovskiy (Latvia) Larisa Neiland	6	7^{7}
(United Kingdom) Neil Broad (South Africa) Mariaan de Swardt	5	6	6
(South Africa) John-Laffnie de Jager (Switzerland) Martina Hingis	7	3	4

Semifinals
1	(Canada) Grant Connell (United States) Lindsay Davenport	6	2	3
4	(Czech Republic) Cyril Suk (Czech Republic) Helena Suková	3	6	6
3	(Russia) Andrei Olhovskiy (Latvia) Larisa Neiland	7^{9}	4	6
(United Kingdom) Neil Broad (South Africa) Mariaan de Swardt	6^{7}	6	3

Final
4	(Czech Republic) Cyril Suk (Czech Republic) Helena Suková	4	6	6
3	(Russia) Andrei Olhovskiy (Latvia) Larisa Neiland	6	3	4

=== Top half ===
==== Section 1 ====
First round
1	(Canada) G Connell (United States) L Davenport	4	6	6
(Netherlands) T Kempers (France) N van Lottum	6	2	2
(United States) J Waite (Croatia) M Murić	4	6^{6}
(Argentina) D Orsanic (Argentina) F Labat	6	7^{8}
(Netherlands) S Noteboom (Canada) S Jeyaseelan	6^{4}	5
(United States) TJ Middleton (United States) L McNeil	7^{7}	7
(Belarus) M Mirnyi (Russia) E Likhovtseva	7^{7}	6
9	(Australia) J Eagle (Netherlands) C Vis	6^{3}	4
15	(India) M Bhupathi (Japan) R Hiraki	6^{4}	6	6
WC	(South Africa) C van Rensburg (United States) V Williams	7^{7}	3	2
(Italy) F Messori (Italy) F Perfetti	6	6
(United States) S Davis (Argentina) P Tarabini	4	4
WC	(United Kingdom) M Petchey (United Kingdom) C Wood	4	0
(Spain) E Sánchez (Spain) A Sánchez Vicario	6	0^{r}
(The Bahamas) R Smith (United States) A Frazier	1	6	2
5	(United States) R Leach (Netherlands) M Bollegraf	6	2	6

Second round
1	(Canada) G Connell (United States) L Davenport	6	6
(Argentina) D Orsanic (Argentina) F Labat	3	3
(United States) TJ Middleton (United States) L McNeil	7^{7}	6
(Belarus) M Mirnyi (Russia) E Likhovtseva	6^{5}	4
15	(India) M Bhupathi (Japan) R Hiraki	3	7	6
(Italy) F Messori (Italy) F Perfetti	6	5	3
WC	(United Kingdom) M Petchey (United Kingdom) C Wood	6^{4}	3
5	(United States) R Leach (Netherlands) M Bollegraf	7^{7}	6

Third round
1	(Canada) G Connell (United States) L Davenport	4	7^{7}	6
(United States) TJ Middleton (United States) L McNeil	6	6^{2}	4
15	(India) M Bhupathi (Japan) R Hiraki	3	7	4
5	(United States) R Leach (Netherlands) M Bollegraf	6	5	6

Quarterfinals
1	(Canada) G Connell (United States) L Davenport	6	6
5	(United States) R Leach (Netherlands) M Bollegraf	4	4

==== Section 2 ====
First round
4	(Czech Republic) C Suk (Czech Republic) H Suková	6	7
(United States) T Kronemann (United States) K Rinaldi-Stunkel	1	5
(United States) M Jensen (Netherlands) B Schultz-McCarthy	5	7^{7}	1
(United States) J Gimelstob (United States) C Rubin	7	6^{5}	6
(South Africa) P Norval (South Africa) L Horn	6^{1}	3
(United States) K Kinnear (Japan) N Miyagi	7^{7}	6
(Australia) A Florent (Australia) C Barclay	7^{8}	1	11
13	(United States) L Jensen (United States) K Adams	6^{6}	6	13
11	(Belgium) L Pimek (Belgium) S Appelmans	5	6	1
(Netherlands) T Nijssen (Indonesia) Y Basuki	7	4	6
(United States) M Keil (United States) G Helgeson-Nielsen	4	6	6
(Australia) P Kilderry (France) S Testud	6	0	3
(France) G Raoux (Italy) L Golarsa	6	7^{7}
(South Africa) B Talbot (Belgium) D Van Roost	3	6^{3}
(South Africa) K Ullyett (South Africa) R Nideffer	7^{7}	4	2
7	(South Africa) D Adams (France) A Fusai	6^{2}	6	6

Second round
4	(Czech Republic) C Suk (Czech Republic) H Suková	7^{7}	6
(United States) J Gimelstob (United States) C Rubin	6^{2}	1
(United States) K Kinnear (Japan) N Miyagi	7	6
13	(United States) L Jensen (United States) K Adams	5	4
(Netherlands) T Nijssen (Indonesia) Y Basuki	6	6
(United States) M Keil (United States) G Helgeson-Nielsen	3	4
(France) G Raoux (Italy) L Golarsa	3	4
7	(South Africa) D Adams (France) A Fusai	6	6

Third round
4	(Czech Republic) C Suk (Czech Republic) H Suková	6	7
(United States) K Kinnear (Japan) N Miyagi	2	5
(Netherlands) T Nijssen (Indonesia) Y Basuki	6	7
7	(South Africa) D Adams (France) A Fusai	4	5

Quarterfinals
4	(Czech Republic) C Suk (Czech Republic) H Suková	6	0	6
(Netherlands) T Nijssen (Indonesia) Y Basuki	1	6	4

=== Bottom half ===
==== Section 3 ====
First round
8	(The Bahamas) M Knowles (Russia) A Kournikova	6	7
(United States) S Melville (Australia) N Pratt	4	5
WC	(United Kingdom) C Wilkinson (United Kingdom) S Smith	6	3	1
(India) L Paes (Romania) R Dragomir	4	6	6
(South Africa) M Barnard (Netherlands) K Boogert	6	7^{7}
(United States) G Van Emburgh (Czech Republic) E Melicharová	2	6^{2}
(Australia) D Macpherson (Australia) R McQuillan	7^{7}	6^{4}	11
16	(United States) A O'Brien (United States) C Morariu	6^{4}	7^{7}	13
14	(Argentina) P Albano (Argentina) M Paz	6	6
(Australia) A Kratzmann (Australia) K-A Guse	2	4
(Australia) W Arthurs (Slovenia) T Križan	7	1	11
(North Macedonia) A Kitinov (Poland) A Olsza	5	6	9
(Sweden) R Bergh (Canada) P Hy-Boulais	5	7	4
(Sweden) P Nyborg (Sweden) Å Carlsson	7	5	6
(Sweden) D Ekerot (Australia) L Pleming	6^{4}	1
3	(Russia) A Olhovskiy (Latvia) L Neiland	7^{7}	6

Second round
8	(The Bahamas) M Knowles (Russia) A Kournikova	^{w/o}
(India) L Paes (Romania) R Dragomir
(South Africa) M Barnard (Netherlands) K Boogert	2	6	6
16	(United States) A O'Brien (United States) C Morariu	6	4	3
14	(Argentina) P Albano (Argentina) M Paz	4	2
(Australia) W Arthurs (Slovenia) T Križan	6	6
(Sweden) P Nyborg (Sweden) Å Carlsson	5	3
3	(Russia) A Olhovskiy (Latvia) L Neiland	7	6

Third round
(India) L Paes (Romania) R Dragomir	5	6	6
(South Africa) M Barnard (Netherlands) K Boogert	7	3	4
(Australia) W Arthurs (Slovenia) T Križan	2	6^{4}
3	(Russia) A Olhovskiy (Latvia) L Neiland	6	7^{7}

Quarterfinals
(India) L Paes (Romania) R Dragomir	3	6^{5}
3	(Russia) A Olhovskiy (Latvia) L Neiland	6	7^{7}

==== Section 4 ====
First round
6	(Australia) S Stolle (United States) MJ Fernández	7^{7}	3	7
(Italy) C Brandi (France) A Dechaume-Balleret	6^{4}	6	5
(United Kingdom) N Broad (South Africa) M de Swardt	7	6
Alt	(United States) D Randall (Australia) D Jones	5	4
(Netherlands) S Groen (Czech Republic) H Vildová	5	5
WC	(United Kingdom) D Sapsford (United Kingdom) S-A Siddall	7	7
(Netherlands) HJ Davids (Netherlands) M Oremans	3	4
10	(United States) D Johnson (United States) L Wild	6	6
12	(United States) J Grabb (United States) D Graham	6	5	13
(Germany) K Braasch (Germany) B Rittner	4	7	15
(United States) K Jones (Australia) K Kunce	6	6
(South Africa) B Haygarth (United States) T Whitlinger-Jones	4	3
Alt	(United Kingdom) P Hand (United Kingdom) V Lake	1	3
(South Africa) J-L de Jager (Switzerland) M Hingis	6	6
(Zimbabwe) W Black (United States) A Grossman	6	3	5
2	(United States) P Galbraith (United States) L Raymond	4	6	7

Second round
6	(Australia) S Stolle (United States) MJ Fernández	3	6	3
(United Kingdom) N Broad (South Africa) M de Swardt	6	3	6
WC	(United Kingdom) D Sapsford (United Kingdom) S-A Siddall	6	6
10	(United States) D Johnson (United States) L Wild	2	3
(Germany) K Braasch (Germany) B Rittner	6	5	6
(United States) K Jones (Australia) K Kunce	2	7	4
(South Africa) J-L de Jager (Switzerland) M Hingis	6	0	10
2	(United States) P Galbraith (United States) L Raymond	4	6	8

Third round
(United Kingdom) N Broad (South Africa) M de Swardt	7	6
WC	(United Kingdom) D Sapsford (United Kingdom) S-A Siddall	5	3
(Germany) K Braasch (Germany) B Rittner	4	3
(South Africa) J-L de Jager (Switzerland) M Hingis	6	6

Quarterfinals
(United Kingdom) N Broad (South Africa) M de Swardt	5	6	6
(South Africa) J-L de Jager (Switzerland) M Hingis	7	3	4
