= 1997 Wimbledon Championships – Women's doubles =

Women's doubles
- 1997 Wimbledon Championships

Final
- Champions: (United States) Gigi Fernández (Belarus) Natasha Zvereva
- Runners-up: (United States) Nicole Arendt (Netherlands) Manon Bollegraf
- Score: 7–6^{(7–4)}, 6–4

Details
- Draw: 64 (2 Q / 4 WC )
- Seeds: 16

Events
Singles	men	women		boys	girls
Doubles	men	women	mixed	boys	girls
WC Singles	men	women	quad
WC Doubles	men	women	quad
Legends	men	women	seniors
← 1996 ·	Wimbledon Championships	· 1998 →

Martina Hingis and Helena Suková were the defending champions but decided not to play together. Hingis teamed up with Arantxa Sánchez Vicario and lost in quarterfinals to Nicole Arendt and Manon Bollegraf, and Suková teamed with Larisa Neiland and lost in semifinals against the same pair.

Gigi Fernández and Natasha Zvereva defeated Arendt and Bollegraf in the final, 7–6^{(7–4)}, 6–4 to win the ladies' doubles tennis title at the 1997 Wimbledon Championships. It was the 4th Wimbledon title, 17th Grand Slam and 69th overall title for Fernández and the 5th Wimbledon title, 18th Grand Slam and 67th overall title for Zvereva, in their respective doubles careers.

== Seeds ==
1. (United States) Gigi Fernández / (Belarus) Natasha Zvereva (champions)
2. (Switzerland) Martina Hingis / (Spain) Arantxa Sánchez Vicario (quarterfinals)
3. (United States) Lindsay Davenport / (Czech Republic) Jana Novotná (quarterfinals, withdrew)
4. (Latvia) Larisa Neiland / (Czech Republic) Helena Suková (semifinals)
5. (United States) Mary Joe Fernández / (United States) Lisa Raymond (quarterfinals)
6. (United States) Nicole Arendt / (Netherlands) Manon Bollegraf (final)
7. (Spain) Conchita Martínez / (Argentina) Patricia Tarabini (first round)
8. (Indonesia) Yayuk Basuki / (Netherlands) Caroline Vis (third round)
9. (United States) Katrina Adams / (United States) Lori McNeil (third round)
10. (France) Nathalie Tauziat / (United States) Linda Wild (third round)
11. (Japan) Naoko Kijimuta / (Japan) Nana Miyagi (third round)
12. (Belgium) Sabine Appelmans / (Netherlands) Miriam Oremans (semifinals)
13. (France) Alexandra Fusai / (Italy) Rita Grande (third round)
14. (United States) Amy Frazier / (United States) Kimberly Po (third round)
15. (United States) Chanda Rubin / (Netherlands) Brenda Schultz-McCarthy (third round)
16. (Netherlands) Kristie Boogert / (Romania) Irina Spîrlea (second round)

Click on the seed number of a player to go to their draw section.

== Draw ==
=== Key ===
- Q = Qualifier
- WC = Wild card
- LL = Lucky loser
- Alt = Alternate
- ITF = ITF entry
- PR = Protected ranking
- SR = Special ranking
- SE = Special exempt
- JE = Junior exempt
- JR = Junior Accelerator Programme entrant
- CO = College Accelerator Programme entrant
- NG = Next Gen Accelerator Program entrant
- w/o = Walkover
- r = Retired
- d = Defaulted

=== Finals ===
Quarterfinals
1	(United States) Gigi Fernández (Belarus) Natasha Zvereva	5	6	6
5	(United States) Mary Joe Fernández (United States) Lisa Raymond	7	4	4
3	(United States) Lindsay Davenport (Czech Republic) Jana Novotná	w/o
12	(Belgium) Sabine Appelmans (Netherlands) Miriam Oremans
(Belgium) Els Callens (United States) Ginger Helgeson-Nielsen	4	4
4	(Latvia) Larisa Neiland (Czech Republic) Helena Suková	6	6
6	(United States) Nicole Arendt (Netherlands) Manon Bollegraf	6	5	6
2	(Switzerland) Martina Hingis (Spain) Arantxa Sánchez Vicario	4	7	2

Semifinals
1	(United States) Gigi Fernández (Belarus) Natasha Zvereva	6	6
12	(Belgium) Sabine Appelmans (Netherlands) Miriam Oremans	1	2
4	(Latvia) Larisa Neiland (Czech Republic) Helena Suková	2	6	1
6	(United States) Nicole Arendt (Netherlands) Manon Bollegraf	6	3	6

Final
1	(United States) Gigi Fernández (Belarus) Natasha Zvereva	7^{7}	6
6	(United States) Nicole Arendt (Netherlands) Manon Bollegraf	6^{4}	4

=== Top half ===
==== Section 1 ====
First round
1	(United States) G Fernández (Belarus) N Zvereva	6	6
WC	(Belarus) O Barabanschikova (United Kingdom) S Smith	2	2
(Germany) K Freye (Netherlands) S Noorlander	7^{7}	4	6
(Canada) P Hy-Boulais (Slovakia) K Studeníková	6^{5}	6	2
(Australia) C Barclay (United Kingdom) C Wood	6	6
(Italy) S Farina (Austria) B Schett	4	3
WC	(United Kingdom) J Pullin (United Kingdom) L Woodroffe	3	2
16	(Netherlands) K Boogert (Romania) I Spîrlea	6	6
9	(United States) K Adams (United States) L McNeil	7^{7}	6
(Spain) V Ruano Pascual (Argentina) P Suárez	6^{3}	3
(Germany) B Rittner (Belgium) D Van Roost	4	6	6
(Australia) A Ellwood (Australia) R McQuillan	6	1	1
(Romania) C Cristea (Poland) M Grzybowska	7	6
(Sweden) Å Carlsson (Italy) F Perfetti	5	3
(South Africa) L Horn (South Africa) M de Swardt	2	1
5	(United States) MJ Fernández (United States) L Raymond	6	6

Second round
1	(United States) G Fernández (Belarus) N Zvereva	6	6
(Germany) K Freye (Netherlands) S Noorlander	0	2
(Australia) C Barclay (United Kingdom) C Wood	4	7^{7}	6
16	(Netherlands) K Boogert (Romania) I Spîrlea	6	6^{5}	4
9	(United States) K Adams (United States) L McNeil	6	1	6
(Germany) B Rittner (Belgium) D Van Roost	3	6	4
(Romania) C Cristea (Poland) M Grzybowska	3	0
5	(United States) MJ Fernández (United States) L Raymond	6	6

Third round
1	(United States) G Fernández (Belarus) N Zvereva	7	7
(Australia) C Barclay (United Kingdom) C Wood	5	5
9	(United States) K Adams (United States) L McNeil	1	6^{1}
5	(United States) MJ Fernández (United States) L Raymond	6	7^{7}

Quarterfinals
1	(United States) G Fernández (Belarus) N Zvereva	5	6	6
5	(United States) MJ Fernández (United States) L Raymond	7	4	4

==== Section 2 ====
First round
3	(United States) L Davenport (Czech Republic) J Novotná	6	6
(Slovenia) T Križan (France) N van Lottum	0	2
(United States) D Graham (Australia) K Kunce	6	6
LL	(Russia) J Lutrova (United Kingdom) J Wood	4	1
WC	(United Kingdom) S-A Siddall (United Kingdom) A Wainwright	6	6
(Czech Republic) P Langrová (Slovakia) R Zrubáková	3	2
(Argentina) M Paz (France) A-G Sidot	3	0
13	(France) A Fusai (Italy) R Grande	6	6
12	(Belgium) S Appelmans (Netherlands) M Oremans
(Romania) R Dragomir (Croatia) I Majoli	w/o
(Australia) D Jones (Thailand) T Tanasugarn	2	6^{3}
(France) A Dechaume-Balleret (France) S Testud	6	7^{7}
(Italy) L Garrone (Italy) G Pizzichini	6	6
(United States) A Grossman (Slovakia) K Habšudová	2	4
(Canada) S Jeyaseelan (Canada) R Simpson	4	2
8	(Indonesia) Y Basuki (Netherlands) C Vis	6	6

Second round
3	(United States) L Davenport (Czech Republic) J Novotná	6	6
(United States) D Graham (Australia) K Kunce	1	2
WC	(United Kingdom) S-A Siddall (United Kingdom) A Wainwright	3	4
13	(France) A Fusai (Italy) R Grande	6	6
12	(Belgium) S Appelmans (Netherlands) M Oremans	6	6
(France) A Dechaume-Balleret (France) S Testud	4	3
(Italy) L Garrone (Italy) G Pizzichini	7	4	2
8	(Indonesia) Y Basuki (Netherlands) C Vis	5	6	6

Third round
3	(United States) L Davenport (Czech Republic) J Novotná	6	6
13	(France) A Fusai (Italy) R Grande	1	1
12	(Belgium) S Appelmans (Netherlands) M Oremans	7	6
8	(Indonesia) Y Basuki (Netherlands) C Vis	5	1

Quarterfinals
3	(United States) L Davenport (Czech Republic) J Novotná	w/o
12	(Belgium) S Appelmans (Netherlands) M Oremans

=== Bottom half ===
==== Section 3 ====
First round
7	(Spain) C Martínez (Argentina) P Tarabini	4	5
(Belgium) E Callens (United States) G Helgeson-Nielsen	6	7
(South Africa) R Nideffer (United States) K Rinaldi-Stunkel	5	3
(Germany) A Huber (United States) M Seles	7	6
Q	(Ukraine) E Brioukhovets (Ukraine) E Tatarkova	3	1
(United States) T Whitlinger-Jones (Croatia) M Murić	6	6
(Japan) R Hiraki (Argentina) F Labat	5	3
14	(United States) A Frazier (United States) K Po	7	6
10	(France) N Tauziat (United States) L Wild	6	1	10
(South Africa) A Coetzer (France) M Pierce	1	6	8
(United States) J Lee (Poland) A Olsza	5	3
(Italy) L Golarsa (Switzerland) P Schnyder	7	6
(Germany) S Meier (Czech Republic) L Němečková	4	6	4
(Ukraine) O Lugina (Germany) E Wagner	6	4	6
(Argentina) L Montalvo (Slovakia) H Nagyová	6	1	4
4	(Latvia) L Neiland (Czech Republic) H Suková	3	6	6

Second round
(Belgium) E Callens (United States) G Helgeson-Nielsen	6	6
(Germany) A Huber (United States) M Seles	2	4
(United States) T Whitlinger-Jones (Croatia) M Murić	2	3
14	(United States) A Frazier (United States) K Po	6	6
10	(France) N Tauziat (United States) L Wild	6^{5}	7^{7}	6
(Italy) L Golarsa (Switzerland) P Schnyder	7^{7}	6^{4}	3
(Ukraine) O Lugina (Germany) E Wagner	3	2
4	(Latvia) L Neiland (Czech Republic) H Suková	6	6

Third round
(Belgium) E Callens (United States) G Helgeson-Nielsen	7^{7}	6
14	(United States) A Frazier (United States) K Po	6^{4}	3
10	(France) N Tauziat (United States) L Wild	4	4
4	(Latvia) L Neiland (Czech Republic) H Suková	6	6

Quarterfinals
(Belgium) E Callens (United States) G Helgeson-Nielsen	4	4
4	(Latvia) L Neiland (Czech Republic) H Suková	6	6

==== Section 4 ====
First round
6	(United States) N Arendt (Netherlands) M Bollegraf	6	6
WC	(United Kingdom) C Taylor (United Kingdom) J Ward	4	4
(South Korea) S-h Park (Chinese Taipei) S-t Wang	6	6
Q	(United Kingdom) V Lake (Australia) L Pleming	4	4
(United States) P Shriver (Australia) E Smylie	6	5	7
(Russia) A Kournikova (Russia) E Likhovtseva	3	7	9
(Hungary) V Csurgó (Germany) C Schneider	4	3
11	(Japan) N Kijimuta (Japan) N Miyagi	6	6
15	(United States) C Rubin (Netherlands) B Schultz-McCarthy	6	7
(Germany) W Probst (Japan) A Sugiyama	1	5
(Japan) M Saeki (Japan) Y Yoshida	6^{1}	7	6
(United States) E deLone (Australia) N Pratt	7^{7}	5	4
(Czech Republic) R Bobková (Czech Republic) E Melicharová	7^{7}	6^{4}	1
(Australia) K-A Guse (United States) C Morariu	6^{5}	7^{7}	6
(Czech Republic) E Martincová (Czech Republic) H Vildová	2	3
2	(Switzerland) M Hingis (Spain) A Sánchez Vicario	6	6

Second round
6	(United States) N Arendt (Netherlands) M Bollegraf	6	6
(South Korea) S-h Park (Chinese Taipei) S-t Wang	2	0
(Russia) A Kournikova (Russia) E Likhovtseva	6	2	5
11	(Japan) N Kijimuta (Japan) N Miyagi	4	6	7
15	(United States) C Rubin (Netherlands) B Schultz-McCarthy	7^{7}	6
(Japan) M Saeki (Japan) Y Yoshida	6^{5}	3
(Australia) K-A Guse (United States) C Morariu	3	3
2	(Switzerland) M Hingis (Spain) A Sánchez Vicario	6	6

Third round
6	(United States) N Arendt (Netherlands) M Bollegraf	6	3	6
11	(Japan) N Kijimuta (Japan) N Miyagi	2	6	1
15	(United States) C Rubin (Netherlands) B Schultz-McCarthy	6^{12}	7^{8}	11
2	(Switzerland) M Hingis (Spain) A Sánchez Vicario	7^{14}	6^{6}	13

Quarterfinals
6	(United States) N Arendt (Netherlands) M Bollegraf	6	5	6
2	(Switzerland) M Hingis (Spain) A Sánchez Vicario	4	7	2
