= 1998 Hall of Fame Tennis Championships – Doubles =

Doubles
- 1998 Hall of Fame Tennis Championships

Final
- Champions: (United States) Doug Flach (Australia) Sandon Stolle
- Runners-up: (Australia) Scott Draper (Australia) Jason Stoltenberg
- Score: 6–2, 4–6, 7–6

Events
Singles	Doubles
← 1997 ·	Hall of Fame Tennis Championships	· 1999 →

The 1998 Hall of Fame Tennis Championships (also known as 1998 Miller Lite Hall of Fame Championships for sponsorship reasons) was a tennis tournament played on grass courts at the International Tennis Hall of Fame in Newport, Rhode Island in the United States and was part of the World Series of the 1998 ATP Tour. It was the 23rd edition of the tournament and was held from July 6 through July 12, 1998.

== Seeds ==
Champion seeds are indicated in bold text while text in italics indicates the round in which those seeds were eliminated.

1. (Canada) Sébastien Lareau / (United States) Alex O'Brien (quarterfinals)
2. Unknown (withdrew)
3. (India) Leander Paes / (Australia) Peter Tramacchi (semifinals)
4. (South Africa) Neville Godwin / (South Africa) Kevin Ullyett (quarterfinals)

== Draw ==
=== Key ===
- Q = Qualifier
- WC = Wild card
- LL = Lucky loser
- Alt = Alternate
- SE = Special exempt
- PR = Protected ranking
- ITF = ITF entry
- JE = Junior exempt
- w/o = Walkover
- r = Retired
- d = Defaulted
- SR = Special ranking

=== Finals ===
First round
1	(Canada) **S Lareau** **(United States) A O'Brien**	**6**	**6**
(United States) M Arnold (United States) J Blake	3	3
(Australia) **P Kilderry** **(United States) K Kinnear**	**6**	2	**6**
(Israel) J Erlich (Mexico) B Martínez	4	**6**	4
4	(South Africa) **N Godwin** **(South Africa) K Ullyett**	**7**	6	**6**
(United States) E Taino (South Africa) M Wakefield	6	**7**	3
(Australia) **S Draper** **(Australia) J Stoltenberg**	**6**	**6**
(Armenia) T Gevorgyan (Armenia) S Sargsian	3	2
(United States) **D DiLucia** **(United States) M Sell**	**6**	**7**
(South Africa) D Nainkin (United States) J Thomas	4	5
3	(India) **L Paes** **(Australia) P Tramacchi**	**6**	**6**
(United States) T Ho (United States) M Sprengelmeyer	3	4
(United States) **D Flach** **(Australia) S Stolle**	**7**	4	**7**
(Italy) S Pescosolido (United States) G Van Emburgh	5	**6**	6
(Switzerland) **L Manta** **(Australia) S Randjelovic**	4	**6**	**6**
(Australia) A Painter (Australia) G Silcock	**6**	4	3

Quarterfinals
1	(Canada) S Lareau (United States) A O'Brien	5	6
(Australia) **P Kilderry** **(United States) K Kinnear**	**7**	**7**
4	(South Africa) N Godwin (South Africa) K Ullyett	3	6
(Australia) **S Draper** **(Australia) J Stoltenberg**	**6**	**7**
(United States) D DiLucia (United States) M Sell	**6**	3	4
3	(India) **L Paes** **(Australia) P Tramacchi**	4	**6**	**6**
(United States) **D Flach** **(Australia) S Stolle**	**6**	**6**
(Switzerland) L Manta (Australia) S Randjelovic	3	4

Semifinals
(Australia) P Kilderry (United States) K Kinnear	6	**7**	4
(Australia) **S Draper** **(Australia) J Stoltenberg**	**7**	6	**6**
3	(India) L Paes (Australia) P Tramacchi	4	4
(United States) **D Flach** **(Australia) S Stolle**	**6**	**6**

Final
(Australia) S Draper (Australia) J Stoltenberg	2	**6**	6
(United States) **D Flach** **(Australia) S Stolle**	**6**	4	**7**
