= 1996 Great American Insurance ATP Championships – Singles =

Singles
- 1996 Great American Insurance ATP Championships

Final
- Champion: (United States) Andre Agassi
- Runner-up: (United States) Michael Chang
- Score: 7–6^{(7–4)}, 6–4

Details
- Draw: 56 (5WC/7Q)
- Seeds: 16

Events
Singles	Doubles
← 1995 ·	Cincinnati Open	· 1997 →

Defending champion Andre Agassi defeated Michael Chang in a rematch of the previous year's final, 7–6^{(7–4)}, 6–4 to win the singles tennis title at the 1996 Cincinnati Masters.

== Seeds ==
The top eight seeds received a bye to the second round.

1. (United States) Pete Sampras (quarterfinals)
2. (Austria) Thomas Muster (semifinals)
3. (United States) Michael Chang (final)
4. (Russia) Yevgeny Kafelnikov (quarterfinals)
5. (Croatia) Goran Ivanišević (quarterfinals)
6. (United States) Andre Agassi (champion)
7. (Netherlands) Richard Krajicek (third round)
8. (United States) Jim Courier (third round)
9. (South Africa) Wayne Ferreira (quarterfinals)
10. (Sweden) Thomas Enqvist (semifinals)
11. (United States) MaliVai Washington (second round)
12. (United States) Todd Martin (second round)
13. (Switzerland) Marc Rosset (first round)
14. (France) Cédric Pioline (second round)
15. (United States) Richey Reneberg (first round)
16. (Australia) Jason Stoltenberg (third round)

== Draw ==
=== Key ===
- Q = Qualifier
- WC = Wild card
- LL = Lucky loser
- Alt = Alternate
- ITF = ITF entry
- PR = Protected ranking
- SR = Special ranking
- SE = Special exempt
- JE = Junior exempt
- JR = Junior Accelerator Programme entrant
- CO = College Accelerator Programme entrant
- NG = Next Gen Accelerator Program entrant
- w/o = Walkover
- r = Retired
- d = Defaulted

=== Finals ===
Semifinals
10	(Sweden) Thomas Enqvist	1	6	2
3	(United States) Michael Chang	6	2	6
6	(United States) Andre Agassi	6	6
2	(Austria) Thomas Muster	4	1

Final
3	(United States) Michael Chang	6^{4}	4
6	(United States) Andre Agassi	7^{7}	6

=== Top half ===
==== Section 1 ====
First round
(Switzerland) J Hlasek	6	3	6
Q	(United States) W McGuire	3	6	3
(Australia) T Woodbridge	3	0
(Czech Republic) P Korda	6	6
(Australia) M Woodforde	6	6
15	(United States) R Reneberg	3	3
10	(Sweden) T Enqvist	6	6
(Zimbabwe) B Black	1	2
(Australia) P Rafter	6	6
(Spain) S Bruguera	1	4
WC	(Morocco) H Arazi	3	1
(United States) V Spadea	6	6

Second round
1	(United States) P Sampras	6	6
(Switzerland) J Hlasek	3	4
(Czech Republic) P Korda	6	2	2
(Australia) M Woodforde	4	6	6
10	(Sweden) T Enqvist	6	7^{7}
(Australia) P Rafter	3	6^{4}
(United States) V Spadea	6^{8}	5
7	(Netherlands) R Krajicek	7^{10}	7

Third round
1	(United States) P Sampras	6^{5}	7	7^{7}
(Australia) M Woodforde	7^{7}	5	6^{4}
10	(Sweden) T Enqvist	7^{9}	6
7	(Netherlands) R Krajicek	6^{7}	2

Quarterfinals
1	(United States) P Sampras	3	3
10	(Sweden) T Enqvist	6	6

==== Section 2 ====
First round
WC	(Czech Republic) M Damm	4	6^{3}
(Ukraine) A Medvedev	6	7^{7}
(Sweden) S Edberg	6	6
(Italy) S Pescosolido	2	1
Q	(Italy) C Caratti	2	6	6
13/WC	(Switzerland) M Rosset	6	3	3
12	(United States) T Martin	6	6
(United States) M Joyce	0	4
(Germany) B Karbacher	6	6
WC	(Netherlands) J Eltingh	2	4
(Sweden) J Björkman	6	7^{7}
(Italy) R Furlan	3	6^{3}

Second round
3	(United States) M Chang	6	4	6
(Ukraine) A Medvedev	2	6	3
(Sweden) S Edberg	6	4	5
Q	(Italy) C Caratti	3	6	7
12	(United States) T Martin	4	6	4
(Germany) B Karbacher	6	4	6
(Sweden) J Björkman	0	4
5	(Croatia) G Ivanišević	6	6

Third round
3	(United States) M Chang	7^{7}	6
Q	(Italy) C Caratti	6^{3}	2
(Germany) B Karbacher	6	3	3
5	(Croatia) G Ivanišević	3	6	6

Quarterfinals
3	(United States) M Chang	6	7
5	(Croatia) G Ivanišević	3	5

=== Bottom half ===
==== Section 3 ====
First round
(Japan) S Matsuoka	6	6^{4}	2
(Sweden) M Larsson	3	7^{7}	6
(Australia) M Philippoussis	4	4
Q	(United States) A O'Brien	6	6
(France) G Raoux	4	5
11	(United States) M Washington	6	7
14	(France) C Pioline	2	6	6
(Australia) S Stolle	6	3	4
(United States) C Woodruff	4	7^{7}	6
WC	(Russia) A Chesnokov	6	6^{0}	1
(United Kingdom) T Henman	6	6
(Netherlands) J Siemerink	3	2

Second round
6	(United States) A Agassi	6	2	6
(Sweden) M Larsson	3	6	4
Q	(United States) A O'Brien	w/o
11	(United States) M Washington
14	(France) C Pioline	6^{2}	5
(United States) C Woodruff	7^{7}	7
(United Kingdom) T Henman	4	4
4	(Russia) Y Kafelnikov	6	6

Third round
6	(United States) A Agassi	6^{5}	6	6
Q	(United States) A O'Brien	7^{7}	3	0
(United States) C Woodruff	7^{7}	4	5
4	(Russia) Y Kafelnikov	6^{5}	6	7

Quarterfinals
6	(United States) A Agassi	7^{7}	3	6
4	(Russia) Y Kafelnikov	6^{1}	6	3

==== Section 4 ====
First round
(Denmark) K Carlsen	6^{4}	4
(United Kingdom) G Rusedski	7^{7}	6
(Czech Republic) D Vacek	6	6
(Spain) À Corretja	4	4
(Belgium) F Dewulf	2	3
9	(South Africa) W Ferreira	6	6
16	(Australia) J Stoltenberg	6	7^{7}
Q	(United States) J Grabb	4	6^{2}
Q	(Australia) S Draper	1	r
Q	(Croatia) S Hiršzon	6
Q	(Poland) W Kowalski	3	7	6
(Sweden) N Kulti	6	5	3

Second round
8	(United States) J Courier	6^{3}	6	6
(United Kingdom) G Rusedski	7^{7}	3	4
(Czech Republic) D Vacek	2	6	1
9	(South Africa) W Ferreira	6	3	6
16	(Australia) J Stoltenberg	7^{7}	6
Q	(Croatia) S Hiršzon	6^{2}	3
Q	(Poland) W Kowalski	1	1
2	(Austria) T Muster	6	6

Third round
8	(United States) J Courier	6^{9}	7^{7}	2
9	(South Africa) W Ferreira	7^{11}	6^{4}	6
16	(Australia) J Stoltenberg	2	2
2	(Austria) T Muster	6	6

Quarterfinals
9	(South Africa) W Ferreira	6^{4}	6^{14}
2	(Austria) T Muster	7^{7}	7^{16}

== Qualifying ==
=== Qualifying seeds ===
The top five seeds received a bye to the second round.

1. (Slovakia) Ján Krošlák (qualifying competition)
2. (Australia) Scott Draper (qualified)
3. (Russia) Andrei Olhovskiy (second round)
4. (South Africa) Grant Stafford (second round)
5. (Australia) Michael Tebbutt (second round)
6. (The Bahamas) Mark Knowles (first round)
7. (United States) Jonathan Stark (qualifying competition)
8. (Canada) Sébastien Lareau (second round)
9. (Italy) Cristiano Caratti (qualified)
10. (United States) Jim Grabb (qualified)
11. (United States) Alex Reichel (qualifying competition)
12. (Poland) Wojciech Kowalski (qualified)
13. (Nigeria) Sule Ladipo (qualifying competition)
14. (United States) Michael Sell (second round)

=== Qualifiers ===
1. (Poland) Wojciech Kowalski
2. (Australia) Scott Draper
3. (United States) Wade McGuire
4. (United States) Alex O'Brien
5. (United States) Jim Grabb
6. (Croatia) Saša Hiršzon
7. (Italy) Cristiano Caratti

=== Qualifying draw ===
==== First qualifier ====
First round
(United States) Chad Clark	4	6	7
(Greece) Niko Karagiannis	6	0	6
(United States) Marcus Fluitt	6	3	7
WC	(United States) Matthew Pledger	3	6	5
(Federal Republic of Yugoslavia) Nebojša Đorđević	7	3	6
12	(Poland) Wojciech Kowalski	6	6	7

Second round
1	(Slovakia) Ján Krošlák	6	7
(United States) Chad Clark	2	6
(United States) Marcus Fluitt	6	1
12	(Poland) Wojciech Kowalski	7	6

Qualifying competition
1	(Slovakia) Ján Krošlák	4	2
12	(Poland) Wojciech Kowalski	6	6

==== Second qualifier ====
First round
WC	(United States) Greg Van Emburgh	3	2
(United States) Keith Evans	6	6
(Germany) Tommy Haas	6	6
(Belarus) Max Mirnyi	4	4
(United States) Chris Tontz	4	7	3
14	(United States) Michael Sell	6	6	6

Second round
2	(Australia) Scott Draper	6	6
(United States) Keith Evans	3	4
(Germany) Tommy Haas	6	6
14	(United States) Michael Sell	4	3

Qualifying competition
2	(Australia) Scott Draper	6	7
(Germany) Tommy Haas	2	6

==== Third qualifier ====
First round
(United States) Wade McGuire	6	6
(United States) David Ortiz	2	2
(United States) Graham Gilles	4	6
(United States) Jim Thomas	6	7
(Sweden) Ludwig Sundin	1	1
13	(Nigeria) Sule Ladipo	6	6

Second round
3	(Russia) Andrei Olhovskiy	7	5	1
(United States) Wade McGuire	6	7	6
(United States) Jim Thomas	6	6	3
13	(Nigeria) Sule Ladipo	4	7	6

Qualifying competition
(United States) Wade McGuire	6	6
13	(Nigeria) Sule Ladipo	3	4

==== Fourth qualifier ====
First round
(United States) Geoff Grant	4	6
(United States) Alex O'Brien	6	7
(Ghana) Frank Ofori	6	6
WC	(United States) Michael Griesser	2	2
(United States) Frank Salazar	1	2
11	(United States) Alex Reichel	6	6

Second round
4	(South Africa) Grant Stafford	6	1
(United States) Alex O'Brien	7	6
(Ghana) Frank Ofori	3	5
11	(United States) Alex Reichel	6	7

Qualifying competition
(United States) Alex O'Brien	6	6
11	(United States) Alex Reichel	2	4

==== Fifth qualifier ====
First round
(Sweden) Mikael Stadling	7	6
(Australia) David Macpherson	6	2
(United States) Dan Kronauge	4	1
(United States) Mashiska Washington	6	6
WC	(United States) Randy Baldemor	3	2
10	(United States) Jim Grabb	6	6

Second round
5	(Australia) Michael Tebbutt	6	1
(Sweden) Mikael Stadling	7	6
(United States) Mashiska Washington	1	2
10	(United States) Jim Grabb	6	6

Qualifying competition
(Sweden) Mikael Stadling	0	3
10	(United States) Jim Grabb	6	6

==== Sixth qualifier ====
First round
6	(The Bahamas) Mark Knowles	6	1	2
(South Africa) Robbie Koenig	3	6	6
(United States) Marq Foster	5	3
(Canada) Ryan Clark	7	6
(Croatia) Saša Hiršzon	6	6
(Sweden) Peter Nyborg	2	1
(United States) Mitch Sprengelmeyer	7	2	1
8	(Canada) Sébastien Lareau	5	6	6

Second round
(South Africa) Robbie Koenig	6	6
(Canada) Ryan Clark	1	2
(Croatia) Saša Hiršzon	6	6
8	(Canada) Sébastien Lareau	3	4

Qualifying competition
(South Africa) Robbie Koenig	2	4
(Croatia) Saša Hiršzon	6	6

==== Seventh qualifier ====
First round
7	(United States) Jonathan Stark	6	6
(United States) Brian Eagle	3	2
(United States) Ford Lankford	2	3
WC	(United States) Curt Josselyn	6	6
(United States) David DiLucia	4	6
(United States) Chuck Adams	6	7
(France) Cedric Kauffmann	3	1
9	(Italy) Cristiano Caratti	6	6

Second round
7	(United States) Jonathan Stark	6	6
WC	(United States) Curt Josselyn	4	3
(United States) Chuck Adams	6	5	4
9	(Italy) Cristiano Caratti	1	7	6

Qualifying competition
7	(United States) Jonathan Stark	4	2
9	(Italy) Cristiano Caratti	6	6
