= 1999 Hall of Fame Tennis Championships – Singles =

Singles
- 1999 Hall of Fame Tennis Championships

Final
- Champion: (United States) Chris Woodruff
- Runner-up: (Denmark) Kenneth Carlsen
- Score: 6–7^{(5–7)}, 6–4, 6–4

Details
- Draw: 32 (3WC/4Q)
- Seeds: 8

Events
Singles	Doubles
← 1998 ·	Hall of Fame Open	· 2000 →

Leander Paes was the defending champion, but lost in the quarterfinals to Wayne Arthurs.

Chris Woodruff won the title by defeating Kenneth Carlsen 6–7^{(5–7)}, 6–4, 6–4 in the final.

== Seeds ==
1. (South Africa) Wayne Ferreira (second round)
2. (Australia) Jason Stoltenberg (first round)
3. (Germany) David Prinosil (second round)
4. (Australia) Andrew Ilie (quarterfinals)
5. (Armenia) Sargis Sargsian (second round)
6. (United States) Justin Gimelstob (first round)
7. (Canada) Daniel Nestor (second round)
8. (Canada) Sébastien Lareau (first round)

== Draw ==
=== Key ===
- Q = Qualifier
- WC = Wild card
- LL = Lucky loser
- Alt = Alternate
- SE = Special exempt
- PR = Protected ranking
- ITF = ITF entry
- JE = Junior exempt
- w/o = Walkover
- r = Retired
- d = Defaulted
- SR = Special ranking

=== Finals ===
Semifinals
(Australia) Wayne Arthurs	6^{4}	7^{7}	4
(United States) Chris Woodruff	7^{7}	6^{5}	6
(Italy) Laurence Tieleman	6^{6}	1
(Denmark) Kenneth Carlsen	7^{8}	6

Final
(United States) Chris Woodruff	6^{5}	6	6
(Denmark) Kenneth Carlsen	7^{7}	4	4

=== Top half ===
First round
1/WC	(South Africa) W Ferreira	6	6
(Italy) M Navarra	3	3
(India) L Paes	6	6
(Federal Republic of Yugoslavia) N Zimonjić	1	3
Q	(France) C Kauffmann	4	3
(Australia) W Arthurs	6	6
(Australia) M Hill	4	6	5
7	(Canada) D Nestor	6	3	7
3	(Germany) D Prinosil	6	6
Q	(United States) S Humphries	4	4
(United States) C Woodruff	6	6
(Netherlands) R Wassen	3	2
(South Africa) N Godwin	3	1
(Italy) S Pescosolido	6	6
(Belarus) M Mirnyi	6	7^{7}
6	(United States) J Gimelstob	3	6^{2}

Second round
1/WC	(South Africa) W Ferreira	2	2
(India) L Paes	6	6
(Australia) W Arthurs	6^{6}	6	7^{7}
7	(Canada) D Nestor	7^{8}	4	6^{5}
3	(Germany) D Prinosil	2	4
(United States) C Woodruff	6	6
(Italy) S Pescosolido	7^{7}	6
(Belarus) M Mirnyi	6^{5}	3

Quarterfinals
(India) L Paes	7^{9}	6^{3}	3
(Australia) W Arthurs	6^{7}	7^{7}	6
(United States) C Woodruff	6	6
(Italy) S Pescosolido	2	4

Semifinals
(Australia) W Arthurs	6^{4}	7^{7}	4
(United States) C Woodruff	7^{7}	6^{5}	6

=== Bottom half ===
First round
5	(Armenia) S Sargsian	7^{7}	2	6
(Germany) A Pretzsch	6^{5}	6	4
(Italy) L Tieleman	6	6
(Finland) T Ketola	3	4
(Germany) C Vinck	6	6
Q	(United States) T Blake	4	0
(Italy) C Caratti	7	4	5
4	(Australia) A Ilie	5	6	7
8	(Canada) S Lareau	4	2
(Denmark) K Carlsen	6	6
WC	(United States) MV Washington	6	3	4
WC	(United States) J Blake	1	6	6
(Israel) E Ran	3	3
(Netherlands) P Wessels	6	6
Q	(United States) J Stark	6	3	6
2	(Australia) J Stoltenberg	4	6	4

Second round
5	(Armenia) S Sargsian	7^{7}	6^{3}	2
(Italy) L Tieleman	6^{4}	7^{7}	6
(Germany) C Vinck	4	5
4	(Australia) A Ilie	6	7
(Denmark) K Carlsen	6	6
WC	(United States) J Blake	3	4
(Netherlands) P Wessels	6	6
Q	(United States) J Stark	3	4

Quarterfinals
(Italy) L Tieleman	7^{7}	6
4	(Australia) A Ilie	6^{4}	4
(Denmark) K Carlsen	7^{7}	7^{7}
(Netherlands) P Wessels	6^{4}	6^{5}

Semifinals
(Italy) L Tieleman	6^{6}	1
(Denmark) K Carlsen	7^{8}	6
