= 1997 Hall of Fame Tennis Championships – Singles =

Singles
- 1997 Hall of Fame Tennis Championships

Final
- Champion: (Armenia) Sargis Sargsian
- Runner-up: (New Zealand) Brett Steven
- Score: 7–6^{(7–0)}, 4–6, 7–5

Details
- Draw: 32 (3WC/4Q)
- Seeds: 8

Events
Singles	Doubles
← 1996 ·	Hall of Fame Open	· 1998 →

Nicolás Pereira was the defending champion, but did not compete this year.

Sargis Sargsian won the title by defeating Brett Steven 7–6^{(7–0)}, 4–6, 7–5 in the final.

== Seeds ==
1. (Germany) Alex Rădulescu (quarterfinals)
2. (Australia) Mark Woodforde (quarterfinals)
3. (South Africa) Grant Stafford (semifinals)
4. (Australia) Sandon Stolle (quarterfinals)
5. (Armenia) Sargis Sargsian (champion)
6. (Italy) Marzio Martelli (first round)
7. (India) Leander Paes (semifinals)
8. (New Zealand) Brett Steven (final)

== Draw ==
=== Key ===
- Q = Qualifier
- WC = Wild card
- LL = Lucky loser
- Alt = Alternate
- ITF = ITF entry
- PR = Protected ranking
- SR = Special ranking
- SE = Special exempt
- JE = Junior exempt
- JR = Junior Accelerator Programme entrant
- CO = College Accelerator Programme entrant
- NG = Next Gen Accelerator Program entrant
- w/o = Walkover
- r = Retired
- d = Defaulted

=== Finals ===
Semifinals
7	(India) Leander Paes	6^{3}	6	3
5	(Armenia) Sargis Sargsian	7^{7}	2	6
3	(South Africa) Grant Stafford	3	7	4
8	(New Zealand) Brett Steven	6	5	6

Final
5	(Armenia) Sargis Sargsian	7^{7}	4	7
8	(New Zealand) Brett Steven	6^{0}	6	5

=== Top half ===
First round
1	(Germany) A Rădulescu	6	6^{3}	6
(United States) V Spadea	4	7^{7}	3
(Argentina) G Etlis	6^{5}	2
Q	(Australia) B Ellwood	7^{7}	6
(Israel) E Ran	4	4
(France) S Simian	6	6
(Netherlands) F Wibier	5	7^{7}	4
7	(India) L Paes	7	6^{4}	6
4	(Australia) S Stolle	6	6
(United States) S Campbell	2	2
WC	(United States) M Jensen	1	3
(Zimbabwe) K Ullyett	6	6
Q	(United States) D DiLucia	7^{7}	3	7^{7}
(Russia) A Olhovskiy	6^{5}	6	6^{3}
(Canada) D Nestor	6^{3}	5
5	(Armenia) S Sargsian	7^{7}	7

Second round
1	(Germany) A Rădulescu	7^{12}	6
Q	(Australia) B Ellwood	6^{10}	3
(France) S Simian	2	3
7	(India) L Paes	6	6
4	(Australia) S Stolle	7^{7}	7^{7}
(Zimbabwe) K Ullyett	6^{5}	6^{4}
Q	(United States) D DiLucia	5	2
5	(Armenia) S Sargsian	7	6

Quarterfinals
1	(Germany) A Rădulescu	3	6^{1}
7	(India) L Paes	6	7^{7}
4	(Australia) S Stolle	3	5
5	(Armenia) S Sargsian	6	7

Semifinals
7	(India) L Paes	6^{3}	6	3
5	(Armenia) S Sargsian	7^{7}	2	6

=== Bottom half ===
First round
6	(Italy) M Martelli	6	4	2
(United States) D Wheaton	4	6	6
(United States) M Joyce	6	6
(United States) J Gimelstob	0	2
Q	(United States) M Shyjan	4	2
WC	(United States) L Jensen	6	6
(United States) J Salzenstein	5	3
3	(South Africa) G Stafford	7	6
8	(New Zealand) B Steven	6	6
Q	(Mexico) L Herrera	3	2
(United States) G Grant	6^{3}	4
WC	(United States) B Shelton	7^{7}	6
(Belgium) D Norman	7	3	6^{5}
(United States) D Flach	5	6	7^{7}
(United States) S Bryan	6	6^{4}	5
2	(Australia) M Woodforde	3	7^{7}	7

Second round
(United States) D Wheaton	7^{7}	4	6
(United States) M Joyce	6^{5}	6	4
WC	(United States) L Jensen	2	2
3	(South Africa) G Stafford	6	6
8	(New Zealand) B Steven	4	6	6
WC	(United States) B Shelton	6	3	4
(United States) D Flach	3	1
2	(Australia) M Woodforde	6	6

Quarterfinals
(United States) D Wheaton	6	3	2
3	(South Africa) G Stafford	4	6	6
8	(New Zealand) B Steven	6	6
2	(Australia) M Woodforde	0	0

Semifinals
3	(South Africa) G Stafford	3	7	4
8	(New Zealand) B Steven	6	5	6
