= 1996 Great American Insurance ATP Championships – Doubles =

Doubles
- 1996 Great American Insurance ATP Championships

Final
- Champions: (The Bahamas) Mark Knowles (Canada) Daniel Nestor
- Runners-up: (Australia) Sandon Stolle (Czech Republic) Cyril Suk
- Score: 3–6, 6–3, 6–4

Details
- Draw: 28 (4WC)/2Q)
- Seeds: 8

Events
Singles	Doubles
← 1995 ·	Cincinnati Open	· 1997 →

Todd Woodbridge and Mark Woodforde were the defending champions but lost in the quarterfinals to Ellis Ferreira and Jan Siemerink.

Mark Knowles and Daniel Nestor won in the final 3–6, 6–3, 6–4 against Sandon Stolle and Cyril Suk.

== Seeds ==
The top four seeded teams received byes into the second round.

1. (Australia) Todd Woodbridge / (Australia) Mark Woodforde (quarterfinals)
2. (Zimbabwe) Byron Black / (Canada) Grant Connell (quarterfinals)
3. (The Bahamas) Mark Knowles / (Canada) Daniel Nestor (champions)
4. (Russia) Yevgeny Kafelnikov / (Czech Republic) Daniel Vacek (second round)
5. (Netherlands) Jacco Eltingh / (Switzerland) Jakob Hlasek (first round)
6. (Canada) Sébastien Lareau / (United States) Alex O'Brien (second round)
7. (United States) Patrick Galbraith / (Russia) Andrei Olhovskiy (second round)
8. (South Africa) Ellis Ferreira / (Netherlands) Jan Siemerink (semifinals)

== Draw ==
=== Key ===
- Q = Qualifier
- WC = Wild card
- LL = Lucky loser
- Alt = Alternate
- SE = Special exempt
- PR = Protected ranking
- ITF = ITF entry
- JE = Junior exempt
- w/o = Walkover
- r = Retired
- d = Defaulted
- SR = Special ranking

=== Final ===
Semifinals

Final

8
- (South Africa) Ellis Ferreira
- (Netherlands) Jan Siemerink
3
2

3
- (The Bahamas) Mark Knowles
- (Canada) Daniel Nestor
6
6

3
- (The Bahamas) Mark Knowles
- (Canada) Daniel Nestor
3
6
6

- (Australia) Sandon Stolle
- (Czech Republic) Cyril Suk
6
3
4

- (United States) Rick Leach
- (United States) Jonathan Stark
3
1

- (Australia) Sandon Stolle
- (Czech Republic) Cyril Suk
6
6

=== Top half ===
First round

Second round

Quarterfinals

Semifinals

1
- (Australia) T Woodbridge
- (Australia) M Woodforde
6
6
7

Q
- (United States) K Jones
- (United States) C Woodruff
6
6
6

Q
- (United States) K Jones
- (United States) C Woodruff
7
3
5

- (South Africa) M Barnard
- (United States) G Van Emburgh
2
7
1

1
- (Australia) T Woodbridge
- (Australia) M Woodforde
3
6
2

- (Australia) J Eagle
- (Australia) A Florent
5
6
6

8
- (South Africa) E Ferreira
- (Netherlands) J Siemerink
6
3
6

WC
- (United States) L Jensen
- (United States) M Jensen
7
2
7

WC
- (United States) L Jensen
- (United States) M Jensen
4
6
3

Q
- (United States) D Kronauge
- (United States) A Reichel
0
3

8
- (South Africa) E Ferreira
- (Netherlands) J Siemerink
6
4
6

8
- (South Africa) E Ferreira
- (Netherlands) J Siemerink
6
6

8
- (South Africa) E Ferreira
- (Netherlands) J Siemerink
3
2

3
- (The Bahamas) M Knowles
- (Canada) D Nestor
6
6

3
- (The Bahamas) M Knowles
- (Canada) D Nestor
6
7

- (United States) K Kinnear
- (United States) D Randall
6
3
4

- (Czech Republic) M Damm
- (Sweden) P Nyborg
4
6

- (Czech Republic) M Damm
- (Sweden) P Nyborg
3
6
6

3
- (The Bahamas) M Knowles
- (Canada) D Nestor
7
7

- (Australia) M Philippoussis
- (Australia) P Rafter
6
6

- (Australia) M Philippoussis
- (Australia) P Rafter
6
6

- (Australia) P Kilderry
- (Australia) M Tebbutt
2
3

- (Australia) M Philippoussis
- (Australia) P Rafter
6
6

WC
- (Croatia) S Hiršzon
- (Croatia) G Ivanišević
6
2
6

6
- (Canada) S Lareau
- (United States) A O'Brien
2
4

6
- (Canada) S Lareau
- (United States) A O'Brien
4
6
7

=== Bottom half ===
First round

Second round

Quarterfinals

Semifinals

5
- (Netherlands) J Eltingh
- (Switzerland) J Hlasek
3
4

- (United States) R Leach
- (United States) R Reneberg
6
6

- (United States) R Leach
- (United States) R Reneberg
7
6

- (United Kingdom) N Broad
- (South Africa) P Norval
2
7
6

- (United Kingdom) N Broad
- (South Africa) P Norval
6
4

- (Sweden) S Edberg
- (Czech Republic) P Korda
6
6
4

- (United States) R Leach
- (United States) R Reneberg
6
7

WC
- (United Kingdom) T Henman
- (France) G Raoux
2
2

- (Sweden) J Björkman
- (Sweden) N Kulti
2
5

- (Sweden) J Björkman
- (Sweden) N Kulti
6
6

- (Sweden) J Björkman
- (Sweden) N Kulti
7
7

4
- (Russia) Y Kafelnikov
- (Czech Republic) D Vacek
6
6

- (United States) R Leach
- (United States) J Stark
3
1

7
- (United States) P Galbraith
- (Russia) A Olhovskiy
6
3
6

- (Australia) S Stolle
- (Czech Republic) C Suk
6
6

- (United States) T Kronemann
- (Australia) D Macpherson
3
6
3

7
- (United States) P Galbraith
- (Russia) A Olhovskiy
4
7
4

- (Australia) S Stolle
- (Czech Republic) C Suk
6
6
7

- (Australia) S Stolle
- (Czech Republic) C Suk
6
6
6

- (United States) D Johnson
- (Canada) G Michibata
7
4
6

- (Australia) S Stolle
- (Czech Republic) C Suk
6
7

WC
- (Spain) S Bruguera
- (Spain) À Corretja
3
3

2
- (Zimbabwe) B Black
- (Canada) G Connell
4
6

- (United States) J Grabb
- (United States) J Stark
6
6

- (United States) J Grabb
- (United States) R Reneberg
3
5

2
- (Zimbabwe) B Black
- (Canada) G Connell
6
7

== Qualifying ==
=== Qualifying seeds ===
The top three seeds received a bye to the second round.

1. (United States) Kelly Jones / (United States) Chris Woodruff (qualified)
2. (South Africa) Robbie Koenig / (Poland) Wojciech Kowalski (qualifying competition)
3. (United States) Dan Kronauge / (United States) Alex Reichel (qualified)
4. (United States) Brian Eagle / (United States) Jeff Thomas (qualifying competition)

=== Qualifiers ===
1. (United States) Kelly Jones / (United States) Chris Woodruff
2. (United States) Dan Kronauge / (United States) Alex Reichel

=== Qualifying draw ===
==== First qualifier ====
First round				Qualifying competition
				1	(United States) Kelly Jones (United States) Chris Woodruff	6	5	6
4	(United States) Brian Eagle (United States) Jeff Thomas	6	6	4	(United States) Brian Eagle (United States) Jeff Thomas	4	7	0
WC	(United States) Randy Baldemor (United States) Curt Josselyn	4	4

==== Second qualifier ====
First round	Qualifying competition
	3	(United States) Dan Kronauge (United States) Alex Reichel	6	3	6
	2	(South Africa) Robbie Koenig (Poland) Wojciech Kowalski	4	6	4
