= 1999 Hall of Fame Tennis Championships – Doubles =

Doubles
- 1999 Hall of Fame Tennis Championships

Final
- Champions: (Australia) Wayne Arthurs (India) Leander Paes
- Runners-up: (Armenia) Sargis Sargsian (United States) Chris Woodruff
- Score: 6–7^{(6–8)}, 7–6^{(9–7)}, 6–3

Events
Singles	Doubles
← 1998 ·	Hall of Fame Open	· 2000 →

Doug Flach and Sandon Stolle were the defending champions, but competed this year with different partners. Flach teamed up with Mark Merklein and lost in the first round to David DiLucia and Laurence Tieleman, while Stolle teamed up with Max Mirnyi and lost in the first round to Wayne Ferreira and Nenad Zimonjić.

Wayne Arthurs and Leander Paes won the title by defeating Sargis Sargsian and Chris Woodruff 6–7^{(6–8)}, 7–6^{(9–7)}, 6–3 in the final.

== Seeds ==
1. (Australia) Wayne Arthurs / (India) Leander Paes (champions)
2. (United States) Justin Gimelstob / (Canada) Sébastien Lareau (quarterfinals)
3. (Belarus) Max Mirnyi / (Australia) Sandon Stolle (first round)
4. (South Africa) Marius Barnard / (South Africa) Brent Haygarth (first round)

== Draw ==
=== Key ===
- Q = Qualifier
- WC = Wild card
- LL = Lucky loser
- Alt = Alternate
- SE = Special exempt
- PR = Protected ranking
- ITF = ITF entry
- JE = Junior exempt
- w/o = Walkover
- r = Retired
- d = Defaulted
- SR = Special ranking

=== Draw ===
First round
1	(Australia) W Arthurs (India) L Paes	6	6
(Finland) T Ketola (Netherlands) R Wassen	2	2
(United States) S Humphries (Israel) E Ran	5	4
Q	(Italy) M Navarra (Italy) S Pescosolido	7	6
3	(Belarus) M Mirnyi (Australia) S Stolle	4	6^{4}
(South Africa) W Ferreira (Federal Republic of Yugoslavia) N Zimonjić	6	7^{7}
(United States) D Flach (The Bahamas) M Merklein	6^{4}	6^{2}
(United States) D DiLucia (Italy) L Tieleman	7^{7}	7^{7}
WC	(United States) M Arnold (United States) T Blake	6^{3}	7^{7}	4
(United States) J Thomas (United States) D Wheaton	7^{7}	6^{4}	6
WC	(Armenia) S Sargsian (United States) C Woodruff	7	6
4	(South Africa) M Barnard (South Africa) B Haygarth	5	4
(Japan) T Shimada (United States) C Tontz	6^{4}	3
(South Africa) N Godwin (Australia) M Hill	7^{7}	6
WC	(United States) J Blake (United States) G Van Emburgh	6^{2}	6	4
2	(United States) J Gimelstob (Canada) S Lareau	7^{7}	3	6

Quarterfinals
1	(Australia) W Arthurs (India) L Paes	6^{4}	7^{7}	7
Q	(Italy) M Navarra (Italy) S Pescosolido	7^{7}	6^{3}	5
(South Africa) W Ferreira (Federal Republic of Yugoslavia) N Zimonjić
(United States) D DiLucia (Italy) L Tieleman	w/o
(United States) J Thomas (United States) D Wheaton	6^{4}	4
WC	(Armenia) S Sargsian (United States) C Woodruff	7^{7}	6
(South Africa) N Godwin (Australia) M Hill	3	6	6
2	(United States) J Gimelstob (Canada) S Lareau	6	3	2

Semifinals
1	(Australia) W Arthurs (India) L Paes	6	4	6
(United States) D DiLucia (Italy) L Tieleman	3	6	3
WC	(Armenia) S Sargsian (United States) C Woodruff	6	6^{5}	7
(South Africa) N Godwin (Australia) M Hill	2	7^{7}	5

Final
1	(Australia) W Arthurs (India) L Paes	6^{6}	7^{9}	6
WC	(Armenia) S Sargsian (United States) C Woodruff	7^{8}	6^{7}	3
