= 1997 Hall of Fame Tennis Championships – Doubles =

Doubles
- 1997 Hall of Fame Tennis Championships

Final
- Champions: (United States) Justin Gimelstob (New Zealand) Brett Steven
- Runners-up: (United States) Kent Kinnear (North Macedonia) Aleksandar Kitinov
- Score: 6–3, 6–4

Events
| Singles | Doubles |
| ← 1996 · | Hall of Fame Open | · 1998 → |

Marius Barnard and Piet Norval were the defending champions, but Norval did not compete this year. Barnard teamed up with Fernon Wibier and lost in the first round to Doug Flach and T. J. Middleton.

Justin Gimelstob and Brett Steven won the title by defeating Kent Kinnear and Aleksandar Kitinov 6–3, 6–4 in the final.

== Seeds ==
1. (United States) Luke Jensen / (United States) Murphy Jensen (quarterfinals)
2. (South Africa) Marius Barnard / (Netherlands) Fernon Wibier (first round)
3. (India) Leander Paes / (Zimbabwe) Kevin Ullyett (quarterfinals)
4. (United States) Justin Gimelstob / (New Zealand) Brett Steven (champions)

== Draw ==
=== Key ===
- Q = Qualifier
- WC = Wild card
- LL = Lucky loser
- Alt = Alternate
- ITF = ITF entry
- PR = Protected ranking
- SR = Special ranking
- SE = Special exempt
- JE = Junior exempt
- JR = Junior Accelerator Programme entrant
- CO = College Accelerator Programme entrant
- NG = Next Gen Accelerator Program entrant
- w/o = Walkover
- r = Retired
- d = Defaulted

=== Draw ===
First round
1 | (United States) L Jensen (United States) M Jensen | 6 | 6
Q | (Argentina) G Etlis (Mexico) L Herrera | 2 | 1
(United States) D DiLucia (United States) B Shelton | 6 | 6 | 6
(United States) C Clark (United States) T Phillips | 7 | 4 | 4
3 | (India) L Paes (Zimbabwe) K Ullyett | 6 | 6
WC | (United States) Jonathan Beardsley (United States) Jonathan Pastel | 3 | 1
WC | (United States) M Arnold (United States) M Shyjan | 6 | 2
(United States) K Kinnear (North Macedonia) A Kitinov | 7 | 6
(United States) J Salzenstein (United States) D Wheaton | 6 | 7
(South Africa) C Ferreira (France) S Simian | 3 | 5
WC | (United States) M Joyce (United States) V Spadea | 2 | 6 | 5
4 | (United States) J Gimelstob (New Zealand) B Steven | 6 | 3 | 7
LL | (United States) S Campbell (Australia) B Ellwood | 3 | 4
(United States) G Grant (South Africa) G Stafford | 6 | 6
(United States) D Flach (United States) TJ Middleton | 6 | 7
2 | (South Africa) M Barnard (Netherlands) F Wibier | 4 | 6

Quarterfinals
1 | (United States) L Jensen (United States) M Jensen | 7 | 4 | 6
(United States) D DiLucia (United States) B Shelton | 6 | 6 | 7
3 | (India) L Paes (Zimbabwe) K Ullyett | 2 | 6
(United States) K Kinnear (North Macedonia) A Kitinov | 6 | 7
(United States) J Salzenstein (United States) D Wheaton | 3 | 4
4 | (United States) J Gimelstob (New Zealand) B Steven | 6 | 6
(United States) G Grant (South Africa) G Stafford | 6 | 7 | 4
(United States) D Flach (United States) TJ Middleton | 7 | 6 | 6

Semifinals
(United States) D DiLucia (United States) B Shelton | 4 | 4
(United States) K Kinnear (North Macedonia) A Kitinov | 6 | 6
4 | (United States) J Gimelstob (New Zealand) B Steven | 4 | 6 | 7
(United States) D Flach (United States) TJ Middleton | 6 | 3 | 5

Final
(United States) K Kinnear (North Macedonia) A Kitinov | 3 | 4
4 | (United States) J Gimelstob (New Zealand) B Steven | 6 | 6
