= 1995 RCA Championships – Doubles =

Doubles
- 1995 RCA Championships

Final
- Champions: (The Bahamas) Mark Knowles (Canada) Daniel Nestor
- Runners-up: (United States) Scott Davis (United States) Todd Martin
- Score: 6–4, 6–4

Events
| Singles | Doubles |
| ← 1994 · | Indianapolis Tennis Championships | · 1996 → |

Todd Woodbridge and Mark Woodforde were the defending champions, but lost in the quarterfinals to tournament runners-up Scott Davis and Todd Martin.

Mark Knowles and Daniel Nestor won the title by defeating Scott Davis and Todd Martin 6–4, 6–4 in the final.

== Seeds ==
The first four seeds received a bye to the second round.

1. (Australia) Todd Woodbridge / (Australia) Mark Woodforde (quarterfinals)
2. (Canada) Grant Connell / (United States) Patrick Galbraith (second round)
3. (United States) Richey Reneberg / (United States) Jonathan Stark (second round)
4. (Sweden) Jan Apell / (Sweden) Jonas Björkman (quarterfinals)
5. (Sweden) Nicklas Kulti / (New Zealand) Brett Steven (first round)
6. (The Bahamas) Mark Knowles / (Canada) Daniel Nestor (champions)
7. (South Africa) Lan Bale / (South Africa) John-Laffnie de Jager (first round)
8. (South Africa) David Adams / (Czech Republic) Martin Damm (first round)

== Draw ==
=== Key ===
- Q = Qualifier
- WC = Wild card
- LL = Lucky loser
- Alt = Alternate
- SE = Special exempt
- PR = Protected ranking
- ITF = ITF entry
- JE = Junior exempt
- w/o = Walkover
- r = Retired
- d = Defaulted
- SR = Special ranking

=== Finals ===
Semifinals
WC | (United States) Scott Davis (United States) Todd Martin | 6 | 7
(United States) Mark Keil (Sweden) Peter Nyborg | 1 | 6
6 | (The Bahamas) Mark Knowles (Canada) Daniel Nestor | 5 | 6 | 6
(Canada) Sébastien Lareau (United States) Alex O'Brien | 7 | 3 | 2

Final
WC | (United States) Scott Davis (United States) Todd Martin | 4 | 4
6 | (The Bahamas) Mark Knowles (Canada) Daniel Nestor | 6 | 6

=== Top half ===
First round
Q | (Spain) A Berasategui (Spain) À Corretja | 6 | 6 | 7
(United States) K Kinnear (United States) D Wheaton | 4 | 7 | 6
(United States) K Jones (Netherlands) T Nijssen | 6 | 6 | 6
WC | (United States) S Davis (United States) T Martin | 4 | 7 | 7
WC | (Croatia) G Ivanišević (United States) T Nelson | 4 | 7 | 6
7 | (South Africa) L Bale (South Africa) JL de Jager | 6 | 5 | 2
(Belgium) L Pimek (South Africa) B Talbot | 3 | 2
(United States) B MacPhie (Australia) S Stolle | 6 | 6
WC | (United States) B Shelton (United States) V Spadea | 4 | 6 | 6
Q | (United States) D Kronauge (United States) C Woodruff | 6 | 3 | 7
(United States) M Keil (Sweden) P Nyborg | 1 | 7 | 6
5 | (Sweden) N Kulti (New Zealand) B Steven | 6 | 6 | 4

Second round
1 | (Australia) T Woodbridge (Australia) M Woodforde | 6 | 6
Q | (Spain) A Berasategui (Spain) À Corretja | 2 | 1
WC | (United States) S Davis (United States) T Martin | 6 | 3 | 6
WC | (Croatia) G Ivanišević (United States) T Nelson | 4 | 6 | 3
3 | (United States) R Reneberg (United States) J Stark | 6 | 4
(United States) B MacPhie (Australia) S Stolle | 7 | 6
Q | (United States) D Kronauge (United States) C Woodruff | 3 | 4
(United States) M Keil (Sweden) P Nyborg | 6 | 6

Quarterfinals
1 | (Australia) T Woodbridge (Australia) M Woodforde | 1 | 2
WC | (United States) S Davis (United States) T Martin | 6 | 6
(United States) B MacPhie (Australia) S Stolle | 4 | 4
(United States) M Keil (Sweden) P Nyborg | 6 | 6

Semifinals
WC | (United States) S Davis (United States) T Martin | 6 | 7
(United States) M Keil (Sweden) P Nyborg | 1 | 6

=== Bottom half ===
First round
6 | (The Bahamas) M Knowles (Canada) D Nestor | 4 | 6 | 6
(Australia) J Eagle (Australia) A Florent | 6 | 4 | 4
(United States) D Pate (United Kingdom) G Rusedski | 4 | 5
(South Africa) B Haygarth (Portugal) N Marques | 6 | 7
(South Africa) W Ferreira (South Africa) D Visser | 3 | 6
(Australia) J Fitzgerald (Sweden) A Järryd | 6 | 7
8 | (South Africa) D Adams (Czech Republic) M Damm | 6 | 5
(France) O Delaître (United States) J Tarango | 7 | 7
(United States) D Johnson (United States) K Thorne | 1 | 5
WC | (Czech Republic) P Korda (Ukraine) A Medvedev | 6 | 7
(Australia) S Draper (France) G Forget | 3 | 4
(Canada) S Lareau (United States) A O'Brien | 6 | 6

Second round
6 | (The Bahamas) M Knowles (Canada) D Nestor | 6 | 6
(South Africa) B Haygarth (Portugal) N Marques | 3 | 4
(Australia) J Fitzgerald (Sweden) A Järryd | 5 | 6 | 6
4 | (Sweden) J Apell (Sweden) J Björkman | 7 | 1 | 7
(France) O Delaître (United States) J Tarango | 6 | 6 | 4
WC | (Czech Republic) P Korda (Ukraine) A Medvedev | 2 | 7 | 6
(Canada) S Lareau (United States) A O'Brien | 7 | 6 | 7
2 | (Canada) G Connell (United States) P Galbraith | 6 | 7 | 5

Quarterfinals
6 | (The Bahamas) M Knowles (Canada) D Nestor | 6 | 7
4 | (Sweden) J Apell (Sweden) J Björkman | 3 | 5
WC | (Czech Republic) P Korda (Ukraine) A Medvedev | 6 | 6 | 3
(Canada) S Lareau (United States) A O'Brien | 7 | 4 | 6

Semifinals
6 | (The Bahamas) M Knowles (Canada) D Nestor | 5 | 6 | 6
(Canada) S Lareau (United States) A O'Brien | 7 | 3 | 2
