= 1995 RCA Championships – Singles =

Singles
- 1995 RCA Championships

Final
- Champion: (Sweden) Thomas Enqvist
- Runner-up: (Germany) Bernd Karbacher
- Score: 6–4, 6–3

Details
- Draw: 56 (5WC/7Q)
- Seeds: 16

Events
Singles	Doubles
← 1994 ·	RCA Championships	· 1996 →

Wayne Ferreira was the defending champion, but lost in the second round to Richey Reneberg.

Thomas Enqvist won the title by defeating Bernd Karbacher 6–4, 6–3 in the final.

== Seeds ==
The first eight seeds received a bye to the second round.

1. (United States) Pete Sampras (semifinals)
2. (Croatia) Goran Ivanišević (semifinals)
3. (South Africa) Wayne Ferreira (second round)
4. (Sweden) Thomas Enqvist (champion)
5. (United States) Jim Courier (second round)
6. (United States) Todd Martin (third round)
7. (Spain) Alberto Berasategui (quarterfinals)
8. (Ukraine) Andriy Medvedev (quarterfinals)
9. (Spain) Àlex Corretja (first round)
10. (Sweden) Jonas Björkman (second round)
11. (United States) David Wheaton (first round)
12. (Germany) Bernd Karbacher (final)
13. (Australia) Mark Woodforde (second round, retired)
14. (France) Guy Forget (third round)
15. (New Zealand) Brett Steven (third round)
16. (France) Cédric Pioline (first round)

== Draw ==
=== Key ===
- Q = Qualifier
- WC = Wild card
- LL = Lucky loser
- Alt = Alternate
- SE = Special exempt
- PR = Protected ranking
- ITF = ITF entry
- JE = Junior exempt
- w/o = Walkover
- r = Retired
- d = Defaulted
- SR = Special ranking

=== Finals ===
Quarterfinals
1	(United States) Pete Sampras	6	6
8	(Ukraine) Andriy Medvedev	2	2
(United States) Richey Reneberg	6^{3}	5
12	(Germany) Bernd Karbacher	7^{7}	7
(France) Jérôme Golmard	3	1
4	(Sweden) Thomas Enqvist	6	6
7	(Spain) Alberto Berasategui	4	4
2	(Croatia) Goran Ivanišević	6	6

Semifinals
1	(United States) Pete Sampras	6	4	1
12	(Germany) Bernd Karbacher	4	6	6
4	(Sweden) Thomas Enqvist	6	1	6
2	(Croatia) Goran Ivanišević	1	6	3

Final
12	(Germany) Bernd Karbacher	4	3
4	(Sweden) Thomas Enqvist	6	6

=== Top half ===
==== Section 1 ====
First round
(United States) V Spadea	4	6	6
(United States) A Krickstein	6	2	2
WC	(United States) K Kinnear	1	2
(Sweden) J Apell	6	6
WC	(United Kingdom) T Henman	6^{5}	6	7^{7}
16	(France) C Pioline	7^{7}	3	6^{2}
9	(Spain) À Corretja	4	1
(Australia) T Woodbridge	6	6
(Australia) M Tebbutt	6	6
WC	(United States) JM Gambill	3	3
WC	(United States) C Woodruff	6	6
Q	(South Africa) D Adams	4	2

Second round
1	(United States) P Sampras	7	6
(United States) V Spadea	5	4
(Sweden) J Apell	6	6
WC	(United Kingdom) T Henman	3	1
(Australia) T Woodbridge	1	6	7^{7}
(Australia) M Tebbutt	6	3	6^{4}
WC	(United States) C Woodruff	5	3
8	(Ukraine) A Medvedev	7	6

Third round
1	(United States) P Sampras	6	6
(Sweden) J Apell	3	4
(Australia) T Woodbridge	4	6^{2}
8	(Ukraine) A Medvedev	6	7^{7}

Quarterfinals
1	(United States) P Sampras	6	6
8	(Ukraine) A Medvedev	2	2

==== Section 2 ====
First round
(United States) R Reneberg	6	6
(Czech Republic) M Damm	2	2
Q	(Australia) S Stolle	6	6
Q	(Italy) N Bruno	4	2
WC	(Armenia) S Sargsian	3	4
14	(France) G Forget	6	6
12	(Germany) B Karbacher	6	6^{6}	6
(Australia) S Draper	3	7^{8}	3
(Slovakia) K Kučera	6	4^{r}
(Spain) J Burillo	4	5
(United States) J Stark	6	6
(France) O Delaître	3	3

Second round
3	(South Africa) W Ferreira	4	6^{4}
(United States) R Reneberg	6	7^{7}
Q	(Australia) S Stolle	6^{0}	3
14	(France) G Forget	7^{7}	6
12	(Germany) B Karbacher	6^{5}	6	6
(Spain) J Burillo	7^{7}	1	1
(United States) J Stark	5	3
6	(United States) T Martin	7	6

Third round
(United States) R Reneberg	7^{7}	6
14	(France) G Forget	6^{5}	4
12	(Germany) B Karbacher	6	6
6	(United States) T Martin	3	2

Quarterfinals
(United States) R Reneberg	6^{3}	5
12	(Germany) B Karbacher	7^{7}	7

=== Bottom half ===
==== Section 3 ====
First round
(United Kingdom) J Bates	3	5
(France) J Golmard	6	7
Q	(United States) K Thorne	6^{1}	6	1
Q	(Sweden) N Kulti	7^{7}	4	6
(Italy) R Furlan	7^{8}	6
11	(United States) D Wheaton	6^{6}	4
13	(Australia) M Woodforde	7^{10}	4	6
(Peru) J Yzaga	6^{8}	6	4
(Australia) J Stoltenberg	6	3	3
(Italy) C Caratti	3	6	6
(United States) J Tarango	6	6
Q	(United States) D Johnson	2	4

Second round
5	(United States) J Courier	7^{7}	4	6^{1}
(France) J Golmard	6^{5}	6	7^{7}
Q	(Sweden) N Kulti	6	6
(Italy) R Furlan	1	2
13	(Australia) M Woodforde	4	r
(Italy) C Caratti	6
(United States) J Tarango	5	1
4	(Sweden) T Enqvist	7	6

Third round
(France) J Golmard	6	6
Q	(Sweden) N Kulti	4	1
(Italy) C Caratti	0	6	0
4	(Sweden) T Enqvist	6	3	6

Quarterfinals
(France) J Golmard	3	1
4	(Sweden) T Enqvist	6	6

==== Section 4 ====
First round
(France) L Roux	6	6
(Portugal) N Marques	3	4
(Canada) S Lareau	6	3	3
(Czech Republic) P Korda	1	6	6
(United States) B Shelton	4	3
10	(Sweden) J Björkman	6	6
15	(New Zealand) B Steven	6	6
(United States) A O'Brien	1	2
(United Kingdom) G Rusedski	6	7
(Sweden) A Järryd	2	5
Q	(South Africa) G Stafford	3	6	2
(South Africa) M Ondruska	6	4	6

Second round
7	(Spain) A Berasategui	7^{7}	2	6
(France) L Roux	6^{3}	6	3
(Czech Republic) P Korda	7	6
10	(Sweden) J Björkman	5	2
15	(New Zealand) B Steven	7^{7}	4
(United Kingdom) G Rusedski	6^{5}	1^{r}
(South Africa) M Ondruska	4	2
2	(Croatia) G Ivanišević	6	6

Third round
7	(Spain) A Berasategui	7^{9}	6
(Czech Republic) P Korda	6^{7}	3
15	(New Zealand) B Steven	4	6	3
2	(Croatia) G Ivanišević	6	3	6

Quarterfinals
7	(Spain) A Berasategui	4	4
2	(Croatia) G Ivanišević	6	6
