= 1998 Hall of Fame Tennis Championships =

- Date: July 6–12
- Edition: 23rd
- Category: World Series
- Draw: 32S / 16D
- Prize money: $275,000
- Surface: Grass / outdoor
- Location: Newport, Rhode Island, U.S.
- Venue: Newport Casino

Champions

Singles
- (India) Leander Paes

Doubles
- (United States) Doug Flach / (Australia) Sandon Stolle
← 1997 ·	Hall of Fame Open	· 1999 →

The 1998 Hall of Fame Tennis Championships (also known as 1998 Miller Lite Hall of Fame Championships for sponsorship reasons) was a men's tennis tournament played on grass courts at the International Tennis Hall of Fame in Newport, Rhode Island in the United States and was part of the World Series of the 1998 ATP Tour. It was the 23rd edition of the tournament and was held from July 6 through July 12, 1998. Unseeded Leander Paes won the singles title.

== Finals ==
=== Singles ===
(India) Leander Paes defeated (South Africa) Neville Godwin 6–3, 6–2

- It was Paes' only singles title of his career.

=== Doubles ===
(United States) Doug Flach / (Australia) Sandon Stolle defeated (Australia) Scott Draper / (Australia) Jason Stoltenberg 6–2, 4–6, 7–6
