= 2001 Ericsson Open – Men's doubles =

Men's doubles
- 2001 Ericsson Open

Final
- Champions: (Czech Republic) Jiří Novák (Czech Republic) David Rikl
- Runners-up: (Sweden) Jonas Björkman (Australia) Todd Woodbridge
- Score: 7–5, 7–6^{(7–3)}

Details
- Draw: 48 (7WC/3Q/1LL)
- Seeds: 17

Events
Singles	men	women
Doubles	men	women
← 2000 ·	Miami Open	· 2002 →

Todd Woodbridge and Mark Woodforde were the defending champions but only Woodbridge competed that year with Jonas Björkman.

Björkman and Woodbridge lost in the final 7–5, 7–6^{(7–3)} against Jiří Novák and David Rikl.

== Seeds ==
All seventeen seeded teams received byes into the second round.

1. (Sweden) Jonas Björkman / (Australia) Todd Woodbridge (final)
2. (Canada) Daniel Nestor / (Australia) Sandon Stolle (second round)
3. (South Africa) ~~Wayne Ferreira~~ / (Russia) ~~Yevgeny Kafelnikov~~ (entry error)
4. (Czech Republic) Jiří Novák / (Czech Republic) David Rikl (champions)
5. (Sweden) Nicklas Kulti / (Belarus) Max Mirnyi (third round)
6. (United States) Donald Johnson / (United States) Rick Leach (quarterfinals)
7. (Canada) Sébastien Lareau / (United States) Alex O'Brien (second round)
8. (Australia) Wayne Arthurs / (Federal Republic of Yugoslavia) Nenad Zimonjić (quarterfinals)
9. (Zimbabwe) Byron Black / (United States) Jared Palmer (second round)
10. (South Africa) David Adams / (Argentina) Martín García (third round)
11. (Switzerland) Roger Federer / (Slovakia) Dominik Hrbatý (third round)
12. (South Africa) John-Laffnie de Jager / (South Africa) Ellis Ferreira (quarterfinals)
13. (Argentina) Lucas Arnold / (Spain) Tomás Carbonell (second round)
14. (Zimbabwe) Wayne Black / (Zimbabwe) Kevin Ullyett (third round)
15. (Australia) Michael Hill / (United States) Jeff Tarango (third round)
16. (United States) Justin Gimelstob / (United States) Scott Humphries (third round)
17. (The Bahamas) Mark Knowles / (United States) Brian MacPhie (semifinals)

== Draw ==
=== Key ===
- Q = Qualifier
- WC = Wild card
- LL = Lucky loser
- Alt = Alternate
- ITF = ITF entry
- PR = Protected ranking
- SR = Special ranking
- SE = Special exempt
- JE = Junior exempt
- JR = Junior Accelerator Programme entrant
- CO = College Accelerator Programme entrant
- NG = Next Gen Accelerator Program entrant
- w/o = Walkover
- r = Retired
- d = Defaulted

=== Finals ===
Semifinals

Final

1
- (Sweden) Jonas Björkman
- (Australia) Todd Woodbridge
7
6

17
- (The Bahamas) Mark Knowles
- (United States) Brian MacPhie
5
2

1
- (Sweden) Jonas Björkman
- (Australia) Todd Woodbridge
5
6^{3}

4
- (Czech Republic) Jiří Novák
- (Czech Republic) David Rikl
7
7^{7}

4
- (Czech Republic) Jiří Novák
- (Czech Republic) David Rikl
w/o

- (Australia) Lleyton Hewitt
- (Australia) Patrick Rafter

=== Top half ===
==== Section 1 ====
First round

Second round

Third round

Quarterfinals

1
- (Sweden) J Björkman
- (Australia) T Woodbridge
4
7
6

- (United States) J-M Gambill
- (United States) J Stark
4
4

Q
- (South Africa) N Godwin
- (South Africa) J Weir-Smith
6
5
4

Q
- (South Africa) N Godwin
- (South Africa) J Weir-Smith
6
6

1
- (Sweden) J Björkman
- (Australia) T Woodbridge
6^{3}
6
4

- (Argentina) M Hood
- (Argentina) S Prieto
4
6^{5}

15
- (Australia) M Hill
- (United States) J Tarango
7^{7}
1
0^{r}

- (Argentina) D Orsanic
- (Czech Republic) C Suk
6
7^{7}

- (Argentina) D Orsanic
- (Czech Republic) C Suk
3
6^{2}

15
- (Australia) M Hill
- (United States) J Tarango
6
7^{7}

1
- (Sweden) J Björkman
- (Australia) T Woodbridge
6
6

8
(Australia) W Arthurs
(Federal Republic of Yugoslavia) N Zimonjić
2
4

11
- (Switzerland) R Federer
- (Slovakia) D Hrbatý
6
6

- (Sweden) S Aspelin
- (Sweden) J Landsberg
0
6
6

- (Sweden) S Aspelin
- (Sweden) J Landsberg
2
3

WC
- (France) A Clément
- (France) S Grosjean
6
4
3

11
- (Switzerland) R Federer
- (Slovakia) D Hrbatý
3
4

- (France) J Boutter
- (France) F Santoro
3
4

8
(Australia) W Arthurs
(Federal Republic of Yugoslavia) N Zimonjić
6
6

- (Netherlands) P Haarhuis
- (Netherlands) S Schalken
6
6

- (Netherlands) P Haarhuis
- (Netherlands) S Schalken
2
3

8
(Australia) W Arthurs
(Federal Republic of Yugoslavia) N Zimonjić
6
6

==== Section 2 ====
First round

Second round

Third round

Quarterfinals

17
- (The Bahamas) M Knowles
- (United States) B MacPhie
6
6

- (Spain) Á López Morón
- (Spain) A Portas
6
1
1

WC
- (Sweden) T Johansson
- (Sweden) M Norman
4
3

WC
- (Sweden) T Johansson
- (Sweden) M Norman
0
6
6

17
- (The Bahamas) M Knowles
- (United States) B MacPhie
3
6
7^{8}

WC
- (United States) J Blake
- (United States) A Roddick
6
3
7

16
- (United States) J Gimelstob
- (United States) S Humphries
6
3
6^{6}

- (Australia) D Macpherson
- (South Africa) G Stafford
2
6
5

WC
- (United States) J Blake
- (United States) A Roddick
2
7^{7}
4

16
- (United States) J Gimelstob
- (United States) S Humphries
6
6^{1}
6

17
- (The Bahamas) M Knowles
- (United States) B MacPhie
6
6

- (United States) B Bryan
- (United States) M Bryan
4
4

9
- (Zimbabwe) B Black
- (United States) J Palmer
4
6^{2}

- (Spain) J Balcells
- (Russia) A Olhovskiy
6
3
6^{2}

- (South Africa) C Haggard
- (Belgium) T Vanhoudt
6
7^{7}

- (South Africa) C Haggard
- (Belgium) T Vanhoudt
3
6
7^{7}

- (South Africa) C Haggard
- (Belgium) T Vanhoudt
3
6^{4}

- (United States) B Bryan
- (United States) M Bryan
7^{7}
5
7^{7}

- (United States) B Bryan
- (United States) M Bryan
6
7^{7}

LL
- (United States) P Goldstein
- (United States) J Thomas
6^{3}
7
6^{3}

- (United States) B Bryan
- (United States) M Bryan
7
4
6

7
- (Canada) S Lareau
- (United States) A O'Brien
5
6
3

=== Bottom half ===
==== Section 3 ====
First round

Second round

Third round

Quarterfinals

6
- (United States) D Johnson
- (United States) R Leach
6
6

- (Germany) M Kohlmann
- (Germany) D Prinosil
4
2

- (Czech Republic) P Pála
- (Czech Republic) P Vízner
3
4

- (Czech Republic) P Pála
- (Czech Republic) P Vízner
6
6

6
- (United States) D Johnson
- (United States) R Leach
7^{7}
6

- (Argentina) G Etlis
- (Argentina) M Rodríguez
6
7

10
- (South Africa) D Adams
- (Argentina) M García
6^{4}
1

Q
- (South Africa) J Coetzee
- (South Africa) B Haygarth
2
5

- (Argentina) G Etlis
- (Argentina) M Rodríguez
4
6^{7}

10
- (South Africa) D Adams
- (Argentina) M García
6
7^{9}

6
- (United States) D Johnson
- (United States) R Leach
5
6
6^{4}

4
- (Czech Republic) J Novák
- (Czech Republic) D Rikl
7
3
7^{7}

13
- (Argentina) L Arnold
- (Spain) T Carbonell
4
6
5

- (Japan) T Shimada
- (South Africa) M Wakefield
6
4
6

- (Japan) T Shimada
- (South Africa) M Wakefield
6
3
7

- (Spain) A Martín
- (Israel) E Ran
4
6
2

- (Japan) T Shimada
- (South Africa) M Wakefield
6^{6}
4

WC
- (Ecuador) G Lapentti
- (Ecuador) N Lapentti
3
7^{7}
6

4
- (Czech Republic) J Novák
- (Czech Republic) D Rikl
7^{8}
6

WC
- (Spain) À Corretja
- (Switzerland) M Rosset
6
6^{1}
2

WC
- (Ecuador) G Lapentti
- (Ecuador) N Lapentti
4
4

4
- (Czech Republic) J Novák
- (Czech Republic) D Rikl
6
6

==== Section 4 ====
First round

Second round

Third round

Quarterfinals

5
- (Sweden) N Kulti
- (Belarus) M Mirnyi
6
7

- (Czech Republic) T Cibulec
- (Czech Republic) L Friedl
2
6^{5}

WC
- (United States) T Dent
- (United States) C Woodruff
4
5

WC
- (United States) T Dent
- (United States) C Woodruff
6
7^{7}

5
- (Sweden) N Kulti
- (Belarus) M Mirnyi
3
6^{5}

WC
- (Germany) T Haas
- (Germany) N Kiefer
6
6

12
- (South Africa) J-L de Jager
- (South Africa) E Ferreira
6
7^{7}

- (South Africa) M Barnard
- (Australia) A Kratzmann
1
4

WC
- (Germany) T Haas
- (Germany) N Kiefer
6
2
4

12
- (South Africa) J-L de Jager
- (South Africa) E Ferreira
3
6
6

12
- (South Africa) J-L de Jager
- (South Africa) E Ferreira
4
5

- (Australia) L Hewitt
- (Australia) P Rafter
6
7

14
- (Zimbabwe) W Black
- (Zimbabwe) K Ullyett
1
6
6

- (South Africa) R Koenig
- (United States) J Waite
3
6^{4}

- (Argentina) P Albano
- (Brazil) J Oncins
6
2
3

- (Argentina) P Albano
- (Brazil) J Oncins
6
7^{7}

14
- (Zimbabwe) W Black
- (Zimbabwe) K Ullyett
2
4

- (Australia) L Hewitt
- (Australia) P Rafter
6
3
6

- (Australia) L Hewitt
- (Australia) P Rafter
6
6

Q
- (Philippines) C Mamiit
- (United States) V Spadea
3
6
4

- (Australia) L Hewitt
- (Australia) P Rafter
6^{7}
7^{7}
6

2
- (Canada) D Nestor
- (Australia) S Stolle
7^{9}
6^{5}
3

== Qualifying ==
=== Qualifying seeds ===
1. (United States) Paul Goldstein / (United States) Jim Thomas (qualifying competition, lucky losers)
2. (South Africa) Jeff Coetzee / (South Africa) Brent Haygarth (qualified)
3. (South Africa) Neville Godwin / (South Africa) Jason Weir-Smith (qualified)
4. (Germany) Marc-Kevin Goellner / (Philippines) Eric Taino (first round)
5. (North Macedonia) Aleksandar Kitinov / (Netherlands) Jan Siemerink (first round)
6. (Australia) Ashley Fisher / (South Africa) Paul Rosner (first round)

=== Qualifiers ===
1. (Philippines) Cecil Mamiit / (United States) Vince Spadea
2. (South Africa) Jeff Coetzee / (South Africa) Brent Haygarth
3. (South Africa) Neville Godwin / (South Africa) Jason Weir-Smith

=== Lucky losers ===
1. (United States) Paul Goldstein / (United States) Jim Thomas

=== Qualifying draw ===
==== First qualifier ====
First round
1	(United States) Paul Goldstein (United States) Jim Thomas	7^{7}	6
WC	(United States) Kevin Kim (United States) David Wheaton	6^{4}	1
WC	(Philippines) Cecil Mamiit (United States) Vince Spadea	6	2	6
6	(Australia) Ashley Fisher (South Africa) Paul Rosner	3	6	2

Qualifying competition
1	(United States) Paul Goldstein (United States) Jim Thomas	2	5
WC	(Philippines) Cecil Mamiit (United States) Vince Spadea	6	7

==== Second qualifier ====
First round
2	(South Africa) Jeff Coetzee (South Africa) Brent Haygarth	w/o
WC	(United States) Robby Ginepri (United States) Levar Harper-Griffith
WC	(Croatia) Goran Ivanišević (Croatia) Ivan Ljubičić	6	7^{8}
4	(Germany) Marc-Kevin Goellner (Philippines) Eric Taino	4	6^{6}

Qualifying competition
2	(South Africa) Jeff Coetzee (South Africa) Brent Haygarth	7^{11}	4	7^{7}
WC	(Croatia) Goran Ivanišević (Croatia) Ivan Ljubičić	6^{9}	6	6^{5}

==== Third qualifier ====
First round
3	(South Africa) Neville Godwin (South Africa) Jason Weir-Smith	6	6
WC	(United States) David DiLucia (United States) Michael Russell	2	2
(United States) Devin Bowen (United States) Mitch Sprengelmeyer	6	7^{7}
5	(North Macedonia) Aleksandar Kitinov (Netherlands) Jan Siemerink	3	6^{3}

Qualifying competition
3	(South Africa) Neville Godwin (South Africa) Jason Weir-Smith	6^{3}	7^{7}	6
(United States) Devin Bowen (United States) Mitch Sprengelmeyer	7^{7}	6^{4}	4
