= 1996 Miller Lite Hall of Fame Championships – Doubles =

Doubles
- 1996 Miller Lite Hall of Fame Championships

Final
- Champions: (South Africa) Marius Barnard (South Africa) Piet Norval
- Runners-up: (Australia) Paul Kilderry (Australia) Michael Tebbutt
- Score: 6–7, 6–4, 6–4

Details
- Draw: 16
- Seeds: 4

Events
Singles	Doubles
← 1995 ·	Miller Lite Hall of Fame Championships	· 1997 →

Jörn Renzenbrink and Markus Zoecke were the defending champions but did not compete that year.

Marius Barnard and Piet Norval won in the final 6–7, 6–4, 6–4 against Paul Kilderry and Michael Tebbutt.

== Seeds ==
1. (Australia) Patrick Rafter / (United States) Jonathan Stark (quarterfinals, withdrew)
2. (United States) Brian MacPhie / (Australia) Sandon Stolle (first round)
3. (South Africa) Marius Barnard / (South Africa) Piet Norval (champions)
4. (Australia) Paul Kilderry / (Australia) Michael Tebbutt (final)

== Draw ==
=== Key ===
- Q = Qualifier
- WC = Wild card
- LL = Lucky loser
- Alt = Alternate
- ITF = ITF entry
- PR = Protected ranking
- SR = Special ranking
- SE = Special exempt
- JE = Junior exempt
- JR = Junior Accelerator Programme entrant
- CO = College Accelerator Programme entrant
- NG = Next Gen Accelerator Program entrant
- w/o = Walkover
- r = Retired
- d = Defaulted

First round
1	(Australia) P Rafter (United States) J Stark	7	3	7
(Netherlands) J Eltingh (France) S Simian	6	6	6
WC	(United States) D Flach (United States) M Joyce	4	3
(United States) K Thorne (United States) D Wheaton	6	6
4	(Australia) P Kilderry (Australia) M Tebbutt	6	4	6
WC	(United States) T Meringoff (United States) A Rueb	2	6	0
(United States) D DiLucia (India) L Paes	6	6	4
(The Bahamas) M Knowles (The Bahamas) R Smith	4	7	6
(South Africa) B Haygarth (United States) K Kinnear	6	7
WC	(United States) J Gimelstob (United States) J Pugh	4	5
(Canada) S Leblanc (South Africa) M Ondruska	6	3
3	(South Africa) M Barnard (South Africa) P Norval	7	6
Q	(United States) G Grant (South Africa) R Koenig	3	6
(Czech Republic) M Damm (Venezuela) N Pereira	6	7
(Zimbabwe) B Black (Zimbabwe) W Black	6	6
2	(United States) B MacPhie (Australia) S Stolle	2	4

Quarterfinals
1	(Australia) P Rafter (United States) J Stark
(United States) K Thorne (United States) D Wheaton	w/o
4	(Australia) P Kilderry (Australia) M Tebbutt	6	6
(The Bahamas) M Knowles (The Bahamas) R Smith	3	4
(South Africa) B Haygarth (United States) K Kinnear	6	6	5
3	(South Africa) M Barnard (South Africa) P Norval	2	7	7
(Czech Republic) M Damm (Venezuela) N Pereira	4	3
(Zimbabwe) B Black (Zimbabwe) W Black	6	6

Semifinals
(United States) K Thorne (United States) D Wheaton	2	4
4	(Australia) P Kilderry (Australia) M Tebbutt	6	6
3	(South Africa) M Barnard (South Africa) P Norval	2	7	7
(Zimbabwe) B Black (Zimbabwe) W Black	6	5	6

Final
4	(Australia) P Kilderry (Australia) M Tebbutt	7	4	4
3	(South Africa) M Barnard (South Africa) P Norval	6	6	6
