= 1999 Hall of Fame Tennis Championships =

- Date: July 5–11
- Edition: 24th
- Category: World Series
- Draw: 32S / 16D
- Prize money: $295,000
- Surface: Grass / outdoor
- Location: Newport, Rhode Island, U.S.
- Venue: Newport Casino

Champions

Singles
- (United States) Chris Woodruff

Doubles
- (Australia) Wayne Arthurs / (India) Leander Paes
← 1998 ·	Hall of Fame Tennis Championships	· 2000 →

The 1999 Hall of Fame Tennis Championships, also known as Miller Lite Hall of Fame Championships for sponsorship reasons, was a men's tennis tournament played on grass courts at the International Tennis Hall of Fame in Newport, Rhode Island in the United States and was part of the World Series of the 1999 ATP Tour. It was the 24th edition of the tournament and was held from July 5 through July 11, 1999. Unseeded Chris Woodruff won the singles title.

== Finals ==
=== Singles ===
(United States) Chris Woodruff defeated (Denmark) Kenneth Carlsen 6–7^{(5–7)}, 6–4, 6–4

- It was Woodruff's only singles title of the year and the 2nd, and last, of his career.

=== Doubles ===
(Australia) Wayne Arthurs / (India) Leander Paes defeated (Armenia) Sargis Sargsian / (United States) Chris Woodruff 6–7^{(6–8)}, 7–6^{(9–7)}, 6–3
