= 1996 Miller Lite Hall of Fame Championships – Singles =

Singles
- 1996 Miller Lite Hall of Fame Championships

Final
- Champion: (Venezuela) Nicolás Pereira
- Runner-up: (South Africa) Grant Stafford
- Score: 4–6, 6–4, 6–4

Details
- Draw: 32
- Seeds: 8

Events
Singles	Doubles
← 1995 ·	Miller Lite Hall of Fame Championships	· 1997 →

David Prinosil was the defending champion but did not compete that year.

Nicolás Pereira won in the final 4–6, 6–4, 6–4 against Grant Stafford.

== Seeds ==
A champion seed is indicated in bold text while text in italics indicates the round in which that seed was eliminated.

1. (Zimbabwe) Byron Black (quarterfinals)
2. (Japan) Shuzo Matsuoka (first round)
3. (United States) Michael Joyce (second round)
4. (Australia) Sandon Stolle (second round)
5. (Australia) Patrick Rafter (second round)
6. (Czech Republic) Martin Damm (second round)
7. (France) Stéphane Simian (first round)
8. (The Bahamas) Mark Knowles (second round)

== Draw ==
=== Key ===
- Q = Qualifier
- WC = Wild card
- LL = Lucky loser
- Alt = Alternate
- SE = Special exempt
- PR = Protected ranking
- ITF = ITF entry
- JE = Junior exempt
- w/o = Walkover
- r = Retired
- d = Defaulted
- SR = Special ranking

First round
1	(Zimbabwe) **B Black**	**6**	3	**6**
(Netherlands) J Eltingh	4	**6**	3
(United States) D Rostagno	4	**6**	5
Q	(South Africa) **R Koenig**	**6**	4	**7**
(India) **L Paes**	**6**	**6**
WC	(Australia) P Cash	2	2
(United Kingdom) C Wilkinson	1	3
8	(The Bahamas) **M Knowles**	**6**	**6**
3	(United States) **M Joyce**	**7^{10}**	3	**6**
(Zimbabwe) W Black	6^{8}	**6**	3
(Venezuela) **N Pereira**	**7**	**6**
(United States) J Stark	5	3
(United States) S Campbell	**6**	2	1
(Russia) **A Olhovskiy**	4	**6**	**6**
Q	(United States) K Thorne	3	6^{4}
6	(Czech Republic) **M Damm**	**6**	**7^{7}**
5	(Australia) **P Rafter**	**7^{7}**	**6**
WC	(United States) J Gimelstob	6^{4}	4
(United States) D Wheaton	3	**6**	3
(Canada) **D Nestor**	**6**	3	**6**
(South Africa) **M Ondruska**	**6**	**6**
(Italy) G Pozzi	4	1
WC	(United States) B Shelton	4	4
4	(Australia) **S Stolle**	**6**	**6**
7	(France) S Simian	2	5
(Italy) **L Tieleman**	**6**	**7**
(Uzbekistan) O Ogorodov	2	4
(South Africa) **G Stafford**	**6**	**6**
(South Africa) **D Nainkin**	**6**	**6**
Q	(South Africa) P Norval	4	1
Q	(United States) **D DiLucia**	5	**7^{7}**	**6**
2	(Japan) S Matsuoka	**7**	6^{0}	4

Second round
1	(Zimbabwe) **B Black**	**6**	5	**6**
Q	(South Africa) R Koenig	3	**7**	2
(India) **L Paes**	6^{3}	**7^{7}**	**7**
8	(The Bahamas) M Knowles	**7^{7}**	6^{5}	5
3	(United States) M Joyce	4	0	r
(Venezuela) **N Pereira**	**6**	**1**
(Russia) **A Olhovskiy**	**7^{7}**	**7^{7}**
6	(Czech Republic) M Damm	6^{2}	6^{4}
5	(Australia) P Rafter	5	**6**	6^{8}
(Canada) **D Nestor**	**7**	3	**7^{10}**
(South Africa) **M Ondruska**	**6**	**6**
4	(Australia) S Stolle	2	3
(Italy) L Tieleman	6^{4}	2
(South Africa) **G Stafford**	**7^{7}**	**6**
(South Africa) **D Nainkin**	**6**	**7^{7}**
Q	(United States) D DiLucia	2	6^{5}

Quarterfinals
1	(Zimbabwe) B Black	1	**6**	4
(India) **L Paes**	**6**	3	**6**
(Venezuela) **N Pereira**	3	**7^{7}**	**7^{7}**
(Russia) A Olhovskiy	**6**	6^{1}	6^{4}
(Canada) **D Nestor**	5	**7^{7}**	**6**
(South Africa) M Ondruska	**7**	6^{3}	4
(South Africa) **G Stafford**	1	**6**	**6**
(South Africa) D Nainkin	**6**	4	1

Semifinals
(India) L Paes	4	2
(Venezuela) **N Pereira**	**6**	**6**
(Canada) D Nestor	2	2
(South Africa) **G Stafford**	**6**	**6**

Final
(Venezuela) **Nicolás Pereira**	4	**6**	**6**
(South Africa) Grant Stafford	**6**	4	4
