= 1998 Hall of Fame Tennis Championships – Singles =

Singles
- 1998 Hall of Fame Tennis Championships

Final
- Champion: (India) Leander Paes
- Runner-up: (South Africa) Neville Godwin
- Score: 6–3, 6–2

Events
Singles	men	women
Doubles	men	women
← 1997 ·	Hall of Fame Tennis Championships	· 1999 →

The 1998 Hall of Fame Tennis Championships (also known as 1998 Miller Lite Hall of Fame Championships for sponsorship reasons) was a tennis tournament played on grass courts at the International Tennis Hall of Fame in Newport, Rhode Island in the United States and was part of the World Series of the 1998 ATP Tour. It was the 23rd edition of the tournament and was held from July 6 through July 12, 1998.

== Seeds ==
Champion seeds are indicated in bold text while text in italics indicates the round in which those seeds were eliminated.

1. (Australia) Jason Stoltenberg (semifinals)
2. (Australia) Mark Woodforde (second round)
3. (United States) Jeff Tarango (second round)
4. (Armenia) Sargis Sargsian (second round)
5. (Czech Republic) Martin Damm (first round)
6. (Australia) Scott Draper (second round)
7. (Netherlands) John van Lottum (quarterfinals)
8. (South Africa) Grant Stafford (second round)

== Draw ==
=== Key ===
- Q = Qualifier
- WC = Wild card
- LL = Lucky loser
- Alt = Alternate
- SE = Special exempt
- PR = Protected ranking
- ITF = ITF entry
- JE = Junior exempt
- w/o = Walkover
- r = Retired
- d = Defaulted
- SR = Special ranking

=== Finals ===
Semifinals
1	(Australia) Jason Stoltenberg	**6**	1	6^{5}
**(South Africa) Neville Godwin**	3	**6**	**7**
**(India) Leander Paes**	**6**	**6**
(Italy) Laurence Tieleman	3	4

Final
(South Africa) Neville Godwin	3	2
**(India) Leander Paes**	**6**	**6**

=== Top half ===
First round
1	**(Australia) J Stoltenberg**	1	**6**	**7**
(Italy) S Pescosolido	**6**	1	5
**(Australia) L Hewitt**	**6**	**7**
(Switzerland) L Manta	1	6^{5}
**(United States) D Wheaton**	**7**	**6**
(Germany) L Burgsmüller	6^{5}	2
7	**(Netherlands) J van Lottum**	**6**	**6**
(United States) M Sell	1	2
3	**(United States) J Tarango**	6^{5}	**6**	**7**
(United States) J Blake	**7**	4	5
**(United States) J Gimelstob**	4	**6**	**7**
(United States) A O'Brien	**6**	4	5
**(South Africa) N Godwin**	**7**	**7**
(Australia) S Stolle	6^{5}	5
**(Canada) S Lareau**	**6**	**7**
5	(Czech Republic) M Damm	1	5

Second round
1	**(Australia) J Stoltenberg**	**6**	**6**
(Australia) L Hewitt	1	3
(United States) D Wheaton	5	**6**	3
7	**(Netherlands) J van Lottum**	**7**	1	**6**
3	(United States) J Tarango	**6**	1	6^{4}
**(United States) J Gimelstob**	3	**6**	**7**
**(South Africa) N Godwin**	**6**	5	**6**
(Canada) S Lareau	4	**7**	4

Quarterfinals
1	**(Australia) J Stoltenberg**	**6**	**6**
7	(Netherlands) J van Lottum	1	2
(United States) J Gimelstob	**7**	6^{6}	3
**(South Africa) N Godwin**	6^{2}	**7**	**6**

Semifinals
1	(Australia) J Stoltenberg	**6**	1	6^{5}
**(South Africa) N Godwin**	3	**6**	**7**

=== Bottom half ===
First round
6	**(Australia) S Draper**	**6**	**7**
(Spain) Ó Burrieza	3	5
**(India) L Paes**	3	**6**	**6**
(United States) D DiLucia	**6**	3	4
**(Germany) R Schüttler**	**6**	**6**
(United States) T Ho	2	3
4	**(Armenia) S Sargsian**	6^{5}	**6**	**6**
(Canada) D Nestor	**7**	1	4
8	**(South Africa) G Stafford**	**6**	**6**
(Australia) S Randjelovic	2	0
**(The Bahamas) M Knowles**	**7**	3
(Israel) E Erlich	6^{5}	0	R
**(Italy) L Tieleman**	**6**	**7**
(South Africa) K Ullyett	3	5
2	**(Australia) M Woodforde**	**6**	**6**
(France) S Simian	3	2

Second round
6	(Australia) S Draper	5	4
**(India) L Paes**	**7**	**6**
**(Germany) R Schüttler**	**6**	6	**6**
4	(Armenia) S Sargsian	2	**7**	4
8	(South Africa) G Stafford	5	**6**	4
**(The Bahamas) M Knowles**	**7**	4	**6**
**(Italy) L Tieleman**	4	**6**	**6**
2	(Australia) M Woodforde	**6**	3	2

Quarterfinals
**(India) L Paes**	**7**	**6**
(Germany) R Schüttler	6^{4}	2
(The Bahamas) M Knowles	4	5
**(Italy) L Tieleman**	**6**	**7**

Semifinals
**(India) L Paes**	**6**	**6**
(Italy) L Tieleman	3	4
