= 1996 Great American Insurance ATP Championships =

Tennis tournament

- Date: August 5–11
- Edition: 95th
- Category: ATP Super 9
- Draw: 56S / 28D
- Prize money: $1,950,000
- Surface: Clay / outdoor
- Location: Mason, Ohio, U.S.
- Venue: Lindner Family Tennis Center

Champions

Singles
- (United States) Andre Agassi

Doubles
- (The Bahamas) Mark Knowles / (Canada) Daniel Nestor
- Cincinnati Masters

The 1996 Great American Insurance ATP Championships was a tennis tournament played on outdoor clay courts. It was the 95th edition of the Cincinnati Masters and was part of the Mercedes Super 9 of the 1996 ATP Tour. It took place at the Lindner Family Tennis Center in Mason, Ohio in the United States from August 5 through August 11, 1996.

The tournament had previously appeared as part of Tier III of the WTA Tour but no event was held from 1989 to 2003.

== Finals ==
=== Singles ===
(United States) Andre Agassi defeated (United States) Michael Chang 7–6^{(7–4)}, 6–4

- It was Agassi's 3rd title of the year and the 35th of his career. It was his 2nd Masters title of the year and his 9th overall. It was also his 2nd title at the event after winning in 1995.

=== Doubles ===
(The Bahamas) Mark Knowles / (Canada) Daniel Nestor defeated (Australia) Sandon Stolle / (Czech Republic) Cyril Suk 3–6, 6–3, 6–4

- It was Knowles' 5th title of the year and the 9th of his career. It was Nestor's 4th title of the year and the 6th of his career.
