= 2000 Ericsson Open – Men's doubles =

Men's doubles
- 2000 Ericsson Open

Final
- Champion: (Australia) Todd Woodbridge (Australia) Mark Woodforde
- Runner-up: (Czech Republic) Martin Damm (Slovakia) Dominik Hrbatý
- Score: 6–3, 6–4

Events
Singles	men	women
Doubles	men	women
← 1999 ·	Ericsson Open	· 2001 →

Wayne Black and Sandon Stolle were the defending champions, but did not partner together this year. Black partnered Andrew Kratzmann, losing in the second round. Stolle partnered Paul Haarhuis, losing in the quarterfinals.

Todd Woodbridge and Mark Woodforde won the title, defeating Martin Damm and Dominik Hrbatý 6–3, 6–4 in the final.

== Seeds ==
1. (United States) Alex O'Brien / (United States) Jared Palmer (semifinals)
2. (South Africa) Ellis Ferreira / (United States) Rick Leach (third round)
3. (Australia) Todd Woodbridge / (Australia) Mark Woodforde (champions)
4. (Netherlands) Paul Haarhuis / (Australia) Sandon Stolle (quarterfinals)
5. (Sweden) Jonas Björkman / (Zimbabwe) Byron Black (quarterfinals)
6. (Australia) Wayne Arthurs / (India) Leander Paes (second round)
7. (South Africa) David Adams / (South Africa) John-Laffnie de Jager (third round)
8. (United States) Justin Gimelstob / (Canada) Sébastien Lareau (quarterfinals)
9. (Zimbabwe) Wayne Black / (Australia) Andrew Kratzmann (second round)
10. (Czech Republic) Jiří Novák / (Czech Republic) David Rikl (quarterfinals)
11. (France) Olivier Delaître / (France) Fabrice Santoro (second round)
12. (The Bahamas) Mark Knowles / (Belarus) Max Mirnyi (second round)
13. (South Africa) Piet Norval / (Zimbabwe) Kevin Ullyett (third round)
14. (Australia) David Macpherson / (United States) Jeff Tarango (second round)
15. (Germany) David Prinosil / (Sweden) Mikael Tillström (second round)
16. (South Africa) Wayne Ferreira / (Russia) Yevgeny Kafelnikov (second round)

== Draw ==
=== Key ===
- Q = Qualifier
- WC = Wild card
- LL = Lucky loser
- Alt = Alternate
- ITF = ITF entry
- PR = Protected ranking
- SR = Special ranking
- SE = Special exempt
- JE = Junior exempt
- JR = Junior Accelerator Programme entrant
- CO = College Accelerator Programme entrant
- NG = Next Gen Accelerator Program entrant
- w/o = Walkover
- r = Retired
- d = Defaulted

=== Finals ===
Semifinals
1	(United States) Alex O'Brien (United States) Jared Palmer	6	3	5
(Czech Republic) Martin Damm (Slovakia) Dominik Hrbatý	3	6	7
3	(Australia) Todd Woodbridge (Australia) Mark Woodforde	6	6
(United States) Patrick Galbraith (United States) Brian MacPhie	3	4

Final
(Czech Republic) Martin Damm (Slovakia) Dominik Hrbatý	3	4
3	(Australia) Todd Woodbridge (Australia) Mark Woodforde	6	6

=== Top half ===
==== Section 1 ====
First round
Q	(Switzerland) R Federer (Sweden) A Vinciguerra	6	6
(United States) J Grabb (United States) R Reneberg	4	1
Q	(Japan) T Shimada (South Africa) M Wakefield	3	4
(Croatia) G Ivanišević (Czech Republic) D Vacek	6	6
WC	(United States) J Blake (United States) T Blake	6	6
(South Africa) B Haygarth (North Macedonia) A Kitinov	4	3
WC	(United States) L Jensen (United States) M Jensen	0	4
(Spain) T Carbonell (United States) E Taino	6	6

Second round
1	(United States) A O'Brien (United States) J Palmer	6	6
Q	(Switzerland) R Federer (Sweden) A Vinciguerra	4	2
(Croatia) G Ivanišević (Czech Republic) D Vacek	6	0	6
16	(South Africa) W Ferreira (Russia) Y Kafelnikov	1	6	2
10	(Czech Republic) J Novák (Czech Republic) D Rikl	7^{7}	4	6
WC	(United States) J Blake (United States) T Blake	6^{2}	6	3
(Spain) T Carbonell (United States) E Taino	5	4
7	(South Africa) D Adams (South Africa) J-L de Jager	7	6

Third round
1	(United States) A O'Brien (United States) J Palmer	6	6
(Croatia) G Ivanišević (Czech Republic) D Vacek	3	3
10	(Czech Republic) J Novák (Czech Republic) D Rikl	7^{8}	6
7	(South Africa) D Adams (South Africa) J-L de Jager	6^{6}	3

Quarterfinals
1	(United States) A O'Brien (United States) J Palmer	6	6
10	(Czech Republic) J Novák (Czech Republic) D Rikl	3	3

==== Section 2 ====
First round
WC	(United States) P Goldstein (United States) C Woodruff	7^{7}	6
WC	(United States) J Courier (United States) J Stark	6^{4}	3
(Portugal) N Marques (Belgium) T Vanhoudt	6^{4}	5
(Argentina) M Hood (Argentina) S Prieto	7^{7}	7
WC	(Brazil) G Kuerten (Brazil) A Prieto	4	7^{7}	6
WC	(Spain) J Balcells (Spain) À Corretja	6	6^{5}	2
(Argentina) L Arnold Ker (Argentina) M García	1	7^{9}	3
(Czech Republic) M Damm (Slovakia) D Hrbatý	6	6^{7}	6

Second round
4	(Netherlands) P Haarhuis (Australia) S Stolle	6	1	6
WC	(United States) P Goldstein (United States) C Woodruff	4	6	2
(Argentina) M Hood (Argentina) S Prieto	3	6	5
13	(South Africa) P Norval (Zimbabwe) K Ullyett	6	3	7
11	(France) O Delaître (France) F Santoro	7	6^{2}	4
WC	(Brazil) G Kuerten (Brazil) A Prieto	5	7^{7}	6
(Czech Republic) M Damm (Slovakia) D Hrbatý	3	7	6
6	(Australia) W Arthurs (India) L Paes	6	5	4

Third round
4	(Netherlands) P Haarhuis (Australia) S Stolle	4	6	7^{7}
13	(South Africa) P Norval (Zimbabwe) K Ullyett	6	2	6^{4}
WC	(Brazil) G Kuerten (Brazil) A Prieto	2	4
(Czech Republic) M Damm (Slovakia) D Hrbatý	6	6

Quarterfinals
4	(Netherlands) P Haarhuis (Australia) S Stolle	4	2
(Czech Republic) M Damm (Slovakia) D Hrbatý	6	6

=== Bottom half ===
==== Section 3 ====
First round
(South Africa) M Barnard (South Africa) C Haggard	6	6^{5}	4
(Sweden) S Aspelin (Sweden) J Landsberg	1	7^{7}	6
(United States) B Bryan (United States) M Bryan	7	6
(South Africa) L Bale (South Africa) G Stafford	5	1
(United States) J-M Gambill (United States) S Humphries	7^{7}	6
(South Africa) R Koenig (Australia) P Tramacchi	6^{3}	3
(United States) D Johnson (Czech Republic) C Suk	6	3	6
(Spain) JI Carrasco (United States) J Waite	3	6	3

Second round
5	(Sweden) J Björkman (Zimbabwe) B Black	6	6
(Sweden) S Aspelin (Sweden) J Landsberg	3	4
(United States) B Bryan (United States) M Bryan	6	7^{8}
12	(The Bahamas) M Knowles (Belarus) M Mirnyi	4	6^{6}
14	(Australia) D Macpherson (United States) J Tarango	6^{5}	4
(United States) J-M Gambill (United States) S Humphries	7^{7}	6
(United States) D Johnson (Czech Republic) C Suk	4	3
3	(Australia) T Woodbridge (Australia) M Woodforde	6	6

Third round
5	(Sweden) J Björkman (Zimbabwe) B Black	6	6
(United States) B Bryan (United States) M Bryan	4	0
(United States) J-M Gambill (United States) S Humphries	4	6	3
3	(Australia) T Woodbridge (Australia) M Woodforde	6	4	6

Quarterfinals
5	(Sweden) J Björkman (Zimbabwe) B Black	5	6	5
3	(Australia) T Woodbridge (Australia) M Woodforde	7	4	7

==== Section 4 ====
First round
WC	(Ecuador) G Lapentti (Ecuador) N Lapentti	6	7^{8}
(Argentina) P Albano (Socialist Federal Republic of Yugoslavia) N Zimonjić	4	6^{6}
(Sweden) R Bergh (Sweden) P Nyborg	7^{7}	4	4
(Italy) M Bertolini (Italy) C Brandi	6^{2}	6	6
(United States) P Galbraith (United States) B MacPhie	4	6	6
(United States) F Montana (Spain) J Velasco Jr.	6	2	3
Q	(Germany) M-K Goellner (South Africa) M Ondruska	3	6^{5}
(Brazil) J Oncins (Argentina) D Orsanic	6	7^{7}

Second round
8	(United States) J Gimelstob (Canada) S Lareau	6	6
WC	(Ecuador) G Lapentti (Ecuador) N Lapentti	4	3
(Italy) M Bertolini (Italy) C Brandi	6	6
9	(Zimbabwe) W Black (Australia) A Kratzmann	4	4
15	(Germany) D Prinosil (Sweden) M Tillström	4	1
(United States) P Galbraith (United States) B MacPhie	6	6
(Brazil) J Oncins (Argentina) D Orsanic	0	1
2	(South Africa) E Ferreira (United States) R Leach	6	6

Third round
8	(United States) J Gimelstob (Canada) S Lareau	7	6
(Italy) M Bertolini (Italy) C Brandi	5	3
(United States) P Galbraith (United States) B MacPhie	6	6
2	(South Africa) E Ferreira (United States) R Leach	1	3

Quarterfinals
8	(United States) J Gimelstob (Canada) S Lareau	6^{5}	6	3
(United States) P Galbraith (United States) B MacPhie	7^{7}	3	6
