= 1996 Miller Lite Hall of Fame Championships =

- Date: July 8–14
- Edition: 21st
- Category: World Series
- Draw: 32S / 16D
- Prize money: $230,000
- Surface: Grass / outdoor
- Location: Newport, Rhode Island, U.S.
- Venue: Newport Casino

Champions

Singles
- (Venezuela) Nicolás Pereira

Doubles
- (South Africa) Marius Barnard / (South Africa) Piet Norval
← 1995 ·	Hall of Fame Open	· 1997 →

The 1996 Hall of Fame Tennis Championships (also known as 1996 Miller Lite Hall of Fame Championships for sponsorship reasons) was a tennis tournament played on grass courts at the International Tennis Hall of Fame in Newport, Rhode Island in the United States and was part of the World Series of the 1996 ATP Tour. It was the 21st edition of the tournament and was held from July 8 through July 14, 1996.

== Finals ==
=== Singles ===
(Venezuela) Nicolás Pereira defeated (South Africa) Grant Stafford 4–6, 6–4, 6–4

- It was Pereira's only singles title of the year and the 2nd of his career.

=== Doubles ===
(South Africa) Marius Barnard / (South Africa) Piet Norval defeated (Australia) Paul Kilderry / (Australia) Michael Tebbutt 6–7, 6–4, 6–4

- It was Barnard's 2nd title of the year and the 4th of his career. It was Norval's 1st title of the year and the 6th of his career.
