= 1997 Hall of Fame Tennis Championships =

- Date: July 7–13
- Edition: 22nd
- Category: World Series
- Draw: 32S / 16D
- Prize money: $255,000
- Surface: Grass / outdoor
- Location: Newport, Rhode Island, U.S.
- Venue: Newport Casino

Champions

Singles
- (Armenia) Sargis Sargsian

Doubles
- (South Africa) Marius Barnard / (South Africa) Piet Norval
← 1996 ·	Hall of Fame Open	· 1998 →

The 1997 Hall of Fame Tennis Championships (also known as 1997 Miller Lite Hall of Fame Championships for sponsorship reasons) was a men's tennis tournament played on grass courts at the International Tennis Hall of Fame in Newport, Rhode Island in the United States and was part of the World Series of the 1997 ATP Tour. It was the 22nd edition of the tournament and was held from July 7 through July 13, 1997. Fifth-seeded Sargis Sargsian won the singles title.

== Finals ==
=== Singles ===
(Armenia) Sargis Sargsian defeated (New Zealand) Brett Steven 7–6^{(7–0)}, 4–6, 7–5

- It was Sargsian's only singles title of his career.

=== Doubles ===
(United States) Justin Gimelstob / (New Zealand) Brett Steven defeated (United States) Kent Kinnear / (North Macedonia) Aleksandar Kitinov 6–3, 6–4
