= 1995 RCA Championships =

- Date: August 14–20
- Edition: 8th
- Category: Championship Series
- Draw: 56S / 28D
- Prize money: $915,000
- Surface: Hard / outdoors
- Location: Indianapolis, Indiana, U.S.
- Venue: Indianapolis Tennis Center

Champions

Singles
- (Sweden) Thomas Enqvist

Doubles
- (The Bahamas) Mark Knowles / (Canada) Daniel Nestor
- Indianapolis Tennis Championships

The 1995 RCA Championships was a tennis tournament played on outdoor hard courts. It was the 8th edition of the event known that year as the RCA Championships, and was part of the Championship Series of the 1995 ATP Tour. It took place at the Indianapolis Tennis Center in Indianapolis, Indiana, United States, from August 14 through August 20, 1995.

The singles field was led by ATP No. 2, Australian Open runner-up, Wimbledon champion and two-time Indianapolis titlist Pete Sampras, Wimbledon semifinalist and Hamburg finalist Goran Ivanišević, and Dubai and Munich champion Wayne Ferreira. Other top seeds were Auckland, Philadelphia and Pinehurst winner Thomas Enqvist, Adelaide, Scottsdale and Tokyo champion Jim Courier, Todd Martin, Alberto Berasategui and Andrei Medvedev.

== Finals ==
=== Singles ===
(Sweden) Thomas Enqvist defeated (Germany) Bernd Karbacher, 6–4, 6–3

- It was Thomas Enqvist's 4th title of the year, and his 6th overall.

=== Doubles ===
(The Bahamas) Mark Knowles / (Canada) Daniel Nestor defeated (United States) Scott Davis / (United States) Todd Martin, 6–4, 6–4
