= Alex Reichel =

American tennis player

- Country (sports): United States
- Born: March 3, 1971 (age 54) Los Angeles, California
- Height: 6 ft 4 in (1.93 m)
- Turned pro: 1992
- Plays: Right-handed
- Prize money: $135,419

Singles
- Career record: 3–8
- Career titles: 0
- Highest ranking: No. 204 (August 5, 1996)

Grand Slam singles results
- Australian Open: 1R (1997)

Doubles
- Career record: 0–3
- Career titles: 0
- Highest ranking: No. 519 (July 21, 1997)

Alexander Reichel (born March 3, 1971) is a former professional tennis player from the United States.

== Career ==
Reichel, who was coached by Phil Dent, made the quarterfinals at the 1993 South African Open, in Durban. En route he defeated Mark Woodforde, then ranked 21 in the world, as well as Filip Dewulf. He competed in the main draw of the 1997 Australian Open and was beaten by Austrian Gilbert Schaller in the first round. Reichel sustained several serious injuries, including one on his wrist, which made continuing his career tough, ultimately causing him to retire from professional tennis.
