= Dan Kronauge =

American tennis player

- Country (sports): United States
- Born: August 1, 1970 (age 55)
- Plays: Right-handed

Singles
- Highest ranking: No. 924 (July 20, 1992)

Doubles
- Career record: 1–2
- Highest ranking: No. 175 (December 18, 1995)

Grand Slam doubles results
- US Open: Q1 (1995)

Dan Kronauge (born August 1, 1970) is an American former professional tennis player.

Kronauge, a native of Ohio, was an All-American tennis player for Ball State University, before competing on the professional tour in the 1990s.

Specialising in doubles, Kronauge had a best world ranking of 175 and won one ATP Challenger title. His best performance on the ATP Tour was a round of 16 appearance in doubles at the 1995 RCA Championships.

Kronauge is a member of the Cincinnati Tennis Hall of Fame.

His nephew Justin is an associate head coach at Ohio State and a former player.

== ATP Challenger finals ==
=== Doubles: 1 (1–0) ===
Result	No.	Date	Tournament	Surface	Partner	Opponents	Score
Win	1.	Jul 1995	Belo Horizonte, Brazil	Hard	(United States) David DiLucia	(Brazil) Egberto Caldas (Brazil) Cristiano Testa	6–7, 6–3, 6–3
