= Chris Woodruff =

American tennis player

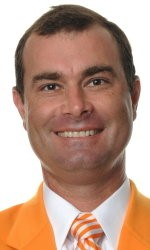
- Country (sports): United States
- Residence: Knoxville, Tennessee
- Born: January 2, 1973 (age 53) Knoxville, Tennessee
- Height: 1.88 m (6 ft 2 in)
- Turned pro: 1993
- Retired: 2001
- Plays: Right-handed (two-handed backhand)
- Prize money: $1,900,659

Singles
- Career record: 109–104 (Grand Slam, ATP Tour-level, and Davis Cup)
- Career titles: 2
- Highest ranking: No. 29 (25 August 1997)

Grand Slam singles results
- Australian Open: QF (2000)
- French Open: 3R (1996, 1997, 1999)
- Wimbledon: 2R (1999, 2001)
- US Open: 3R (1999)

Doubles
- Career record: 38–61 (Grand Slam, ATP Tour-level, and Davis Cup)
- Career titles: 0
- Highest ranking: No. 73 (11 November 1996)

Grand Slam doubles results
- Australian Open: 3R (1997)
- French Open: 2R (1996)
- Wimbledon: 1R (1997)
- US Open: 2R (1996, 1997, 2000)
- Last updated on: 6 September 2021.

Chris Woodruff (born January 3, 1973) is an American former professional tennis player and current head coach at the University of Tennessee. He won the 1997 Canada Masters, reached the quarterfinals of the 2000 Australian Open and attained a career-high ranking of world No. 29 in August 1997.

He hails from Knoxville, Tennessee and was trained at the Knoxville Racquet Club. Since 2002, he has served as an assistant coach with the University of Tennessee men's tennis program, before being named the head coach on May 19, 2017.

== College career ==
Woodruff attended the hometown University of Tennessee where in 1993 he won the NCAA single's title by defeating Wade McGuire of Georgia. He remains the only individual champion the school has ever had. He was also an All-American in 1992.

After winning the collegiate crown, Woodruff began his professional career.

== Professional career ==
Woodruff won two singles titles during his career, and his first was also his biggest: The Canadian Open in 1997, an ATP Masters Series event. After winning that title he posted the highest ranking of his career: World No. 29 on August 25, 1997. At the 1999 Indian Wells Open, Woodruff, then ranked 550th in the world, as a qualifier became the lowest-ranked Masters 1000 semifinalist (since 1990), a title he still holds as of 2025, yet he lost his semifinal match to eventual champion Mark Philippoussis. In 1999, Woodruff won his second career title - the 1999 Newport, Rhode Island event at the Tennis Hall of Fame.

He was named to the United States Davis Cup team in 2000, joining Andre Agassi after Pete Sampras and Todd Martin both were forced to drop out, and won his match against Wayne Black to help erase a 2–1 deficit and advance to the second round. He reached the quarterfinals at the Australian Open in the year 2000 before losing to Pete Sampras in straight sets.

== Coaching career ==
In the summer of 2002, Woodruff returned to the University of Tennessee as a volunteer assistant coach. He served first as an assistant tennis coach before being promoted to associate head coach in 2006 when Sam Winterbotham was hired as head coach. Since Woodruff has been back at Tennessee, the Vols have had 18 All-America and 29 All-Southeastern Conference selections.

Tennessee has steadily improved their record and ranking since Woodruff and Winterbotham began coaching together. The Vols have won 178 dual matches in their first eight seasons and have ended the year ranked in the top 10 nationally five of those years. In 2010, the Vols won the Southeastern Conference regular season and tournament titles and also reached the NCAA Tennis Championship final for the third time in program history. The team finished with 31 victories, the second-most in a season in Tennessee history.

Woodruff was named the 2013 National Assistant Coach of the Year by the Intercollegiate Tennis Association for his track record of player development and keeping the Vols ranked in the top 10 for five of the last six seasons. Since 2008, he has been responsible for coaching three players to the No. 1 national singles ranking: John-Patrick Smith (2010), Rhyne Williams (2011) and Miķelis Lībietis (2013).

In 2014, Woodruff served as the on-court coach for the Vols' first NCAA doubles title in 34 years. Libietis and Hunter Reese defeated Ohio State's Peter Kobelt and Kevin Metka in the final.

== Career finals ==
=== Singles: 4 (2 titles, 2 runner-ups) ===
Legend
Grand Slam (0-0)
Tennis Masters Cup (0-0)
ATP Masters Series (1-0)
ATP Tour (1-2)

Result	W/L	Date	Tournament	Surface	Opponent	Score
Loss	0–1	Mar 1996	Philadelphia	Carpet (i)	(United States) Jim Courier	4–6, 3–6
Loss	0–2	May 1996	Coral Springs	Clay	(Australia) Jason Stoltenberg	6–7^{(4–7)}, 6–2, 5–7
Win	1–2	Jul 1997	Montreal	Hard	(Brazil) Gustavo Kuerten	7–5, 4–6, 6–3
Win	2–2	Jul 1999	Newport	Grass	(Denmark) Kenneth Carlsen	6–7^{(5–7)}, 6–4, 6–4

=== Doubles: 3 (3 runner-ups) ===
Legend
Grand Slam (0-0)
Tennis Masters Cup (0-0)
ATP Masters Series (0-0)
ATP Tour (0-3)

Result	W/L	Date	Tournament	Surface	Partner	Opponents	Score
Loss	0–1	Jul 1996	Washington	Hard	(United States) Doug Flach	(Canada) Grant Connell (United States) Scott Davis	6–7, 6–3, 3–6
Loss	0–2	Nov 1996	Stockholm	Hard (i)	(United States) Todd Martin	(United States) Patrick Galbraith (United States) Jonathan Stark	6–7, 4–6
Loss	0–3	Jul 1999	Newport	Grass	(Armenia) Sargis Sargsian	(Australia) Wayne Arthurs (India) Leander Paes	7–6^{(8–6)}, 6–7^{(7–9)}, 3–6

== ATP Challenger and ITF Futures finals ==
=== Singles: 4 (2–2) ===
Legend ATP Challenger (2–2) ITF Futures (0–0)	Finals by surface Hard (1–2) Clay (0–0) Grass (0–0) Carpet (1–0)

Result	W–L	Date	Tournament	Tier	Surface	Opponent	Score
Loss	0–1	Aug 1994	Bronx, United States	Challenger	Hard	(Spain) Alejo Mancisidor	2–6, 4–6
Loss	0–2	Jul 1995	Aptos, United States	Challenger	Hard	(Canada) Daniel Nestor	3–6, 7–5, 2–6
Win	1–2	Sep 1995	Aruba, Aruba	Challenger	Hard	(United States) Jim Pugh	6–4, 6–2
Win	2–2	Jan 1996	Heilbronn, Germany	Challenger	Carpet	(Italy) Gianluca Pozzi	6–3, 6–3

=== Doubles: 9 (4–5) ===
Legend ATP Challenger (4–5) ITF Futures (0–0)	Finals by surface Hard (3–3) Clay (0–1) Grass (0–0) Carpet (1–1)

Result	W–L	Date	Tournament	Tier	Surface	Partner	Opponents	Score
Win	1–0	Aug 1994	Binghamton, United States	Challenger	Hard	(United States) David Di Lucia	(South Africa) Neville Godwin (United States) Scott Sigerseth	4–6, 6–4, 6–3
Loss	1–1	Jun 1995	Eisenach, Germany	Challenger	Clay	(Canada) Sébastien Leblanc	(Germany) Dirk Dier (Germany) Lars Koslowski	6–3, 3–6, 6–7
Win	2–1	Aug 1995	Lexington, United States	Challenger	Hard	(Netherlands) Fernon Wibier	(Australia) Jamie Morgan (Australia) Andrew Painter	7–5, 6–2
Loss	2–2	Nov 1995	Nantes, France	Challenger	Hard	(Italy) Nicola Bruno	(Canada) Sébastien Lareau (United States) Kent Kinnear	2–6, 6–3, 6–7
Loss	2–3	Nov 1995	Andorra la Vella, Andorra	Challenger	Hard	(Netherlands) Fernon Wibier	(United States) Ken Flach (United States) Kelly Jones	4–6, 3–6
Win	3–3	Feb 1996	Lippstadt, Germany	Challenger	Carpet	(United States) T. J. Middleton	(United States) Jeff Belloli (North Macedonia) Aleksandar Kitinov	7–5, 7–5
Loss	3–4	Nov 1996	Aachen, Germany	Challenger	Hard	(United States) Dave Randall	(South Africa) Robbie Koenig (Uzbekistan) Oleg Ogorodov	4–6, 6–3, 3–6
Loss	3–5	Jan 1999	Heilbronn, Germany	Challenger	Carpet	(United States) Justin Gimelstob	(Germany) Michael Kohlmann (Switzerland) Filippo Veglio	4–6, 7–6, 5–7
Win	4–5	Nov 2001	Burbank, United States	Challenger	Hard	(United States) Scott Humphries	(South Africa) Jeff Coetzee (Finland) Tuomas Ketola	7–5, 1–6, 6–4

== Performance timelines ==
Key
W	F	SF	QF	#R	RR	Q#	DNQ	A	NH

(W) winner; (F) finalist; (SF) semifinalist; (QF) quarterfinalist; (#R) rounds 4, 3, 2, 1; (RR) round-robin stage; (Q#) qualification round; (DNQ) did not qualify; (A) absent; (NH) not held; (SR) strike rate (events won / competed); (W–L) win–loss record.
To avoid confusion and double counting, these charts are updated at the conclusion of a tournament or when the player's participation has ended.

=== Singles ===
Tournament	1993	1994	1995	1996	1997	1998	1999	2000	2001	2002	SR	W–L	Win%
Grand Slam tournaments
Australian Open	A	A	A	A	3R	A	A	QF	3R	Q1	0 / 3	8–3	73%
French Open	A	A	A	3R	3R	A	3R	1R	1R	A	0 / 5	6–5	55%
Wimbledon	A	A	A	1R	1R	A	2R	1R	2R	A	0 / 5	2–5	29%
US Open	1R	Q1	1R	1R	2R	A	3R	2R	2R	A	0 / 7	5–7	42%
Win–loss	0–1	0–0	0–1	2–3	5–3	0–0	5–3	5–4	4–4	0–0	0 / 20	21–19	53%
ATP Masters Series
Indian Wells	A	Q1	A	A	3R	1R	SF	1R	1R	A	0 / 5	6–5	55%
Miami	A	Q2	A	1R	3R	A	1R	1R	2R	A	0 / 5	3–5	38%
Monte Carlo	A	A	A	A	A	A	A	1R	A	A	0 / 1	0–1	0%
Hamburg	A	A	A	A	A	A	A	1R	A	A	0 / 1	0–1	0%
Rome	A	A	A	A	2R	A	1R	1R	A	A	0 / 3	1–3	25%
Canada	A	A	A	2R	W	A	1R	1R	1R	A	1 / 5	7–4	64%
Cincinnati	A	A	A	3R	2R	A	3R	2R	1R	A	0 / 5	6–5	55%
Madrid/Stuttgart^{1}	A	A	A	A	2R	A	2R	A	A	A	0 / 2	2–2	50%
Paris	A	A	A	A	1R	A	A	2R	A	A	0 / 2	1–2	33%
Win–loss	0–0	0–0	0–0	3–2	13–6	0–1	7–6	2–8	1–4	0–0	1 / 29	26–28	48%
Year-end ranking	337	300	135	43	30	1324	51	67	118	496			

=== Doubles ===
Tournament	1993	1994	1995	1996	1997	1998	1999	2000	2001	SR	W–L	Win%
Grand Slam tournaments
Australian Open	A	A	A	A	3R	A	A	A	1R	0 / 2	2–2	50%
French Open	A	A	A	2R	1R	A	A	A	A	0 / 2	1–2	33%
Wimbledon	A	A	A	A	1R	A	A	A	A	0 / 1	0–1	0%
US Open	1R	Q2	1R	2R	2R	A	1R	2R	1R	0 / 7	3–7	30%
Win–loss	0–1	0–0	0–1	2–2	3–4	0–0	0–1	1–1	0–2	0 / 12	6–12	33%
ATP Masters Series
Indian Wells	A	A	A	A	1R	A	1R	QF	A	0 / 3	2–3	40%
Miami	A	A	A	Q1	1R	A	A	2R	2R	0 / 3	2–3	40%
Rome	A	A	A	A	Q1	A	A	A	A	0 / 0	0–0	–
Canada	A	A	A	2R	Q2	A	A	QF	A	0 / 2	3–2	60%
Cincinnati	A	A	A	2R	1R	A	1R	2R	1R	0 / 5	0–5	29%
Paris	A	A	A	A	A	A	A	Q1	A	0 / 0	0–0	–
Win–loss	0–0	0–0	0–0	2–2	0–3	0–0	0–2	6–4	1–2	0 / 13	9–13	41%
