= Neville Godwin =

South African tennis player

- Country (sports): South Africa
- Residence: Johannesburg, South Africa
- Born: 31 January 1975 (age 50); Johannesburg, South Africa
- Height: 1.73 m (5 ft 8 in)
- Turned pro: 1994
- Retired: 2003
- Plays: Right-handed
- Prize money: $912,783

Singles
- Career record: 36–56
- Career titles: 1
- Highest ranking: No. 90 (31 March 1997)

Grand Slam singles results
- Australian Open: 3R (1997)
- French Open: 1R (1997)
- Wimbledon: 4R (1996)
- US Open: 2R (1996)

Doubles
- Career record: 64–74
- Career titles: 0
- Highest ranking: No. 57 (21 August 2000)

Grand Slam doubles results
- Australian Open: 2R (1998)
- French Open: QF (2000)
- Wimbledon: 3R (2002)
- US Open: 3R (1999)

Grand Slam mixed doubles results
- Wimbledon: 3R (1998)
- Last updated on: 22 January 2022.

Neville Godwin (born 31 January 1975) is a tennis coach and a former professional player from South Africa. He has won one singles title (2001 Newport) in his career, and reached his highest individual ranking on the ATP Tour in March 1997, when he became World No. 90. His highest ranking in doubles was World No. 57.

== Professional career ==
Godwin turned professional in 1994.

At the 1996 Wimbledon tournament, Godwin had his best finish at a Grand Slam, when he reached the fourth round as a qualifier, defeating Cristiano Caratti, compatriot Grant Stafford and Boris Becker before losing to Alex Rădulescu.

Godwin retired in 2003.

== Coaching career ==
He now lives in his hometown of Johannesburg with his wife, Nicky and two sons, Oliver and James. He coached performance players out of the Wanderers Club for 5 years, before coaching South African player Kevin Anderson to a world top 10 ranking and a US Open final appearance in 2017. In 2017, he won ATP Coach of the Year award. On 12 November 2017, it was announced Godwin and Anderson had split.

He came into limelight again during the Australian Open 2018 when Hyeon Chung, who was being coached by Godwin became the first player from South Korea to reach the semifinals of a Grand Slam slam.

He currently coaches Alexei Popyrin.

== Junior Grand Slam finals ==
=== Doubles: 3 (1 title, 2 runner-ups) ===
| Result | Year | Tournament | Surface | Partner | Opponents | Score |
|---|---|---|---|---|---|---|
| Loss | 1993 | French Open | Clay | (South Africa) Gareth Williams | (New Zealand) Steven Downs (New Zealand) James Greenhalgh | 1–6, 1–6 |
| Loss | 1993 | Wimbledon | Grass | (South Africa) Gareth Williams | (New Zealand) Steven Downs (New Zealand) James Greenhalgh | 7–6, 6–7, 6–7 |
| Win | 1993 | US Open | Hard | (South Africa) Gareth Williams | (Australia) Ben Ellwood (Australia) James Sekulov | 6–3, 6–3 |

== ATP career finals ==
=== Singles: 2 (1 title, 1 runner-up) ===
| Legend Grand Slam Tournaments (0–0) ATP World Tour Finals (0–0) ATP Masters Series (0–0) ATP Championship Series (0–0) ATP World Series (1–1) | Finals by surface Hard (0–0) Clay (0–0) Grass (1–1) Carpet (0–0) | Finals by setting Outdoors (1–1) Indoors (0–0) |

| Result | W–L | Date | Tournament | Tier | Surface | Opponent | Score |
|---|---|---|---|---|---|---|---|
| Loss | 0–1 | Jul 1998 | Newport, United States | International Series | Grass | (India) Leander Paes | 3–6, 2–6 |
| Win | 1–1 | Jul 2001 | Newport, United States | International Series | Grass | (United Kingdom) Martin Lee | 6–1, 6–4 |

=== Doubles: 3 (3 runner-ups) ===
| Legend Grand Slam Tournaments (0–0) ATP World Tour Finals (0–0) ATP Masters Series (0–0) ATP Championship Series (0–1) ATP World Series (0–2) | Finals by surface Hard (0–2) Clay (0–1) Grass (0–0) Carpet (0–0) | Finals by setting Outdoors (0–3) Indoors (0–0) |

| Result | W–L | Date | Tournament | Tier | Surface | Partner | Opponents | Score |
|---|---|---|---|---|---|---|---|---|
| Loss | 0–1 | Jul 1997 | Washington, United States | Championship Series | Clay | (Netherlands) Fernon Wibier | (United States) Luke Jensen (United States) Murphy Jensen | 4–6, 4–6 |
| Loss | 0–2 | Apr 1998 | Hong Kong, Hong Kong | International Series | Hard | (Finland) Tuomas Ketola | (Zimbabwe) Byron Black (United States) Alex O'Brien | 5–7, 1–6 |
| Loss | 0–3 | Apr 1999 | Chennai, India | World Series | Hard | (Zimbabwe) Wayne Black | (India) Leander Paes (India) Mahesh Bhupathi | 6–4, 5–7, 4–6 |

== ATP Challenger and ITF Futures finals ==
=== Singles: 9 (2–7) ===
| Legend ATP Challenger (2–7) ITF Futures (0–0) | Finals by surface Hard (2–4) Clay (0–0) Grass (0–2) Carpet (0–1) |

| Result | W–L | Date | Tournament | Tier | Surface | Opponent | Score |
|---|---|---|---|---|---|---|---|
| Loss | 0–1 | Dec 1997 | Eilat, Israel | Challenger | Hard | (Finland) Tuomas Ketola | 3–6, 4–6 |
| Win | 1–1 | May 1998 | Jerusalem, Israel | Challenger | Hard | (Romania) Gabriel Trifu | 6–4, 7–6 |
| Loss | 1–2 | May 1999 | Jerusalem, Israel | Challenger | Hard | (Israel) Lior Mor | 5–7, 7–5, 2–6 |
| Loss | 1–3 | Jul 1999 | Manchester, United Kingdom | Challenger | Grass | (Italy) Igor Gaudi | 6–7, 2–6 |
| Loss | 1–4 | Aug 1999 | Istanbul, Turkey | Challenger | Hard | (Uzbekistan) Vadim Kutsenko | 4–6, 6–7^{(3–7)} |
| Win | 2–4 | Nov 2000 | Las Vegas, United States | Challenger | Hard | (Italy) Cristiano Caratti | 6–3, 6–3 |
| Loss | 2–5 | Jun 2001 | Surbiton, United Kingdom | Challenger | Grass | (United States) Taylor Dent | 6–4, 6–7^{(3–7)}, 2–6 |
| Loss | 2–6 | Mar 2002 | Hamburg, Germany | Challenger | Carpet | (Netherlands) Raemon Sluiter | 1–6, 3–6 |
| Loss | 2–7 | Jan 2003 | Waikoloa, United States | Challenger | Hard | (United States) Robby Ginepri | 3–6, 3–6 |

=== Doubles: 18 (11–7) ===
| Legend ATP Challenger (11–7) ITF Futures (0–0) | Finals by surface Hard (7–7) Clay (1–0) Grass (1–0) Carpet (2–0) |

| Result | W–L | Date | Tournament | Tier | Surface | Partner | Opponents | Score |
|---|---|---|---|---|---|---|---|---|
| Loss | 0–1 | Aug 1994 | Binghamton, United States | Challenger | Hard | (United States) Scott Sigerseth | (United States) David Di Lucia (United States) Chris Woodruff | 6–4, 4–6, 3–6 |
| Loss | 0–2 | May 1995 | Bombay, India | Challenger | Hard | (South Africa) David Nainkin | (Zimbabwe) Byron Black (Zimbabwe) Wayne Black | 2–6, 6–7 |
| Win | 1–2 | May 1996 | Jerusalem, Israel | Challenger | Hard | (India) Leander Paes | (Israel) Noam Behr (Israel) Eyal Ran | 7–6, 7–5 |
| Loss | 1–3 | Jul 1996 | Aptos, United States | Challenger | Hard | (United States) Geoff Grant | (Canada) Sébastien Leblanc (Canada) Jocelyn Robichaud | 6–7, 7–6, 5–7 |
| Loss | 1–4 | May 1998 | Jerusalem, Israel | Challenger | Hard | (South Africa) David Nainkin | (Israel) Noam Behr (Israel) Eyal Erlich | walkover |
| Win | 2–4 | Nov 1998 | Brest, France | Challenger | Hard | (South Africa) Marcos Ondruska | (United States) Justin Gimelstob (United States) Brian Macphie | 6–4, 5–7, 6–4 |
| Loss | 2–5 | May 1999 | Jerusalem, Israel | Challenger | Hard | (United Kingdom) Barry Cowan | (Finland) Tuomas Ketola (South Africa) Jeff Coetzee | 2–6, 4–6 |
| Win | 3–5 | Jul 1999 | Manchester, United Kingdom | Challenger | Grass | (South Africa) Jeff Coetzee | (United Kingdom) Jamie Delgado (United Kingdom) Martin Lee | 6–4, 6–2 |
| Loss | 3–6 | Aug 1999 | Istanbul, Turkey | Challenger | Hard | (South Africa) Jeff Coetzee | (Japan) Gouichi Motomura (Uzbekistan) Oleg Ogorodov | 2–6, 6–2, 2–6 |
| Win | 4–6 | Oct 1999 | Hong Kong, Hong Kong | Challenger | Hard | (Australia) Michael Hill | (United States) Bob Bryan (United States) Mike Bryan | 3–6, 7–5, 7–6 |
| Win | 5–6 | Feb 2000 | Hull, United Kingdom | Challenger | Carpet | (United Kingdom) Barry Cowan | (Austria) Julian Knowle (Italy) Stefano Pescosolido | 6–3, 3–6, 6–3 |
| Win | 6–6 | Mar 2000 | Singapore, Singapore | Challenger | Hard | (Australia) Michael Hill | (Australia) Nathan Healey (Australia) Paul Hanley | 6–4, 6–1 |
| Win | 7–6 | Mar 2000 | Hamilton, New Zealand | Challenger | Hard | (Australia) Michael Hill | (United States) Michael Joyce (United States) Jim Thomas | 7–6^{(7–4)}, 6–4 |
| Win | 8–6 | May 2000 | Jerusalem, Israel | Challenger | Hard | (South Africa) Kevin Ullyett | (Israel) Noam Behr (Israel) Eyal Ran | 7–6^{(7–4)}, 7–6^{(7–3)} |
| Loss | 8–7 | Aug 2001 | Segovia, Spain | Challenger | Hard | (South Africa) Marcos Ondruska | (South Africa) Wesley Moodie (South Africa) Shaun Rudman | 6–7^{(5–7)}, 3–6 |
| Win | 9–7 | Nov 2001 | Eckental, Germany | Challenger | Carpet | (Switzerland) George Bastl | (Switzerland) Yves Allegro (Germany) Marcus Hilpert | 6–4, 4–6, 7–5 |
| Win | 10–7 | Apr 2002 | Tarzana, United States | Challenger | Hard | (Switzerland) George Bastl | (United States) Brandon Coupe (United States) Kevin Kim | 6–3, 4–6, 6–3 |
| Win | 11–7 | Apr 2002 | Paget, Bermuda | Challenger | Clay | (Switzerland) George Bastl | (Paraguay) Ramón Delgado (Brazil) Alexandre Simoni | 7–6^{(10–8)}, 6–3 |

== Performance timelines ==
Key
| W | F | SF | QF | #R | RR | Q# | DNQ | A | NH |

(W) winner; (F) finalist; (SF) semifinalist; (QF) quarterfinalist; (#R) rounds 4, 3, 2, 1; (RR) round-robin stage; (Q#) qualification round; (DNQ) did not qualify; (A) absent; (NH) not held; (SR) strike rate (events won / competed); (W–L) win–loss record.

=== Singles ===
| Tournament | 1993 | 1994 | 1995 | 1996 | 1997 | 1998 | 1999 | 2000 | 2001 | 2002 | 2003 | SR | W–L | Win % |
|---|---|---|---|---|---|---|---|---|---|---|---|---|---|---|
Grand Slam tournaments
| Australian Open | A | A | Q3 | Q3 | 3R | Q1 | Q1 | A | Q3 | Q1 | Q3 | 0 / 1 | 2–1 | 67% |
| French Open | A | A | A | A | 1R | Q1 | A | Q1 | Q1 | Q1 | A | 0 / 1 | 0–1 | 0% |
| Wimbledon | Q2 | Q1 | A | 4R | 2R | 1R | Q1 | 3R | 1R | 1R | A | 0 / 6 | 6–6 | 50% |
| US Open | Q1 | A | 1R | 2R | Q1 | Q3 | Q2 | Q2 | Q1 | Q1 | A | 0 / 2 | 1–2 | 33% |
| Win–loss | 0–0 | 0–0 | 0–1 | 4–2 | 3–3 | 0–1 | 0–0 | 2–1 | 0–1 | 0–1 | 0–0 | 0 / 10 | 9–10 | 47% |
ATP Masters Series
| Indian Wells | A | A | A | Q2 | A | A | A | A | A | A | A | 0 / 0 | 0–0 | – |
| Miami | A | A | 1R | Q1 | 1R | 1R | Q1 | A | Q1 | A | A | 0 / 3 | 0–3 | 0% |
| Canada | A | A | Q3 | 1R | 2R | 2R | A | Q2 | A | A | A | 0 / 3 | 2–3 | 40% |
| Cincinnati | A | A | A | A | A | A | A | 1R | A | A | A | 0 / 1 | 0–1 | 0% |
| Paris | A | A | Q1 | A | A | A | A | A | A | A | A | 0 / 0 | 0–0 | – |
| Win–loss | 0–0 | 0–0 | 0–1 | 0–1 | 1–2 | 1–2 | 0–0 | 0–1 | 0–0 | 0–0 | 0–0 | 0 / 7 | 2–7 | 22% |

=== Doubles ===
| Tournament | 1993 | 1994 | 1995 | 1996 | 1997 | 1998 | 1999 | 2000 | 2001 | 2002 | SR | W–L | Win % |
|---|---|---|---|---|---|---|---|---|---|---|---|---|---|
Grand Slam tournaments
| Australian Open | A | A | A | A | A | 2R | 1R | A | 1R | A | 0 / 3 | 1–3 | 25% |
| French Open | A | A | A | A | A | 2R | 1R | QF | 2R | 1R | 0 / 5 | 5–5 | 50% |
| Wimbledon | Q2 | Q1 | A | Q1 | Q1 | 2R | 1R | 1R | 1R | 3R | 0 / 5 | 3–5 | 38% |
| US Open | A | A | Q1 | A | 1R | 1R | 3R | 1R | 1R | 1R | 0 / 6 | 2–6 | 25% |
| Win–loss | 0–0 | 0–0 | 0–0 | 0–0 | 0–1 | 3–4 | 2–4 | 3–3 | 1–4 | 2–3 | 0 / 19 | 11–19 | 37% |
| Miami | A | A | 1R | A | Q2 | 1R | 1R | A | 2R | A | 0 / 4 | 1–4 | 20% |
| Canada | A | A | Q2 | A | QF | Q2 | A | 1R | A | A | 0 / 2 | 2–2 | 50% |
| Cincinnati | A | A | A | A | A | A | A | 2R | A | A | 0 / 1 | 1–1 | 50% |
| Win–loss | 0–0 | 0–0 | 0–1 | 0–0 | 2–1 | 0–1 | 0–1 | 1–2 | 1–1 | 0–0 | 0 / 7 | 4–7 | 36% |

Awards and achievements
| Preceded by (Sweden) Magnus Norman | ATP Coach of the Year; 2017 | Succeeded by (Slovakia) Marián Vajda |
