= Sargis Sargsian =

Armenian tennis player

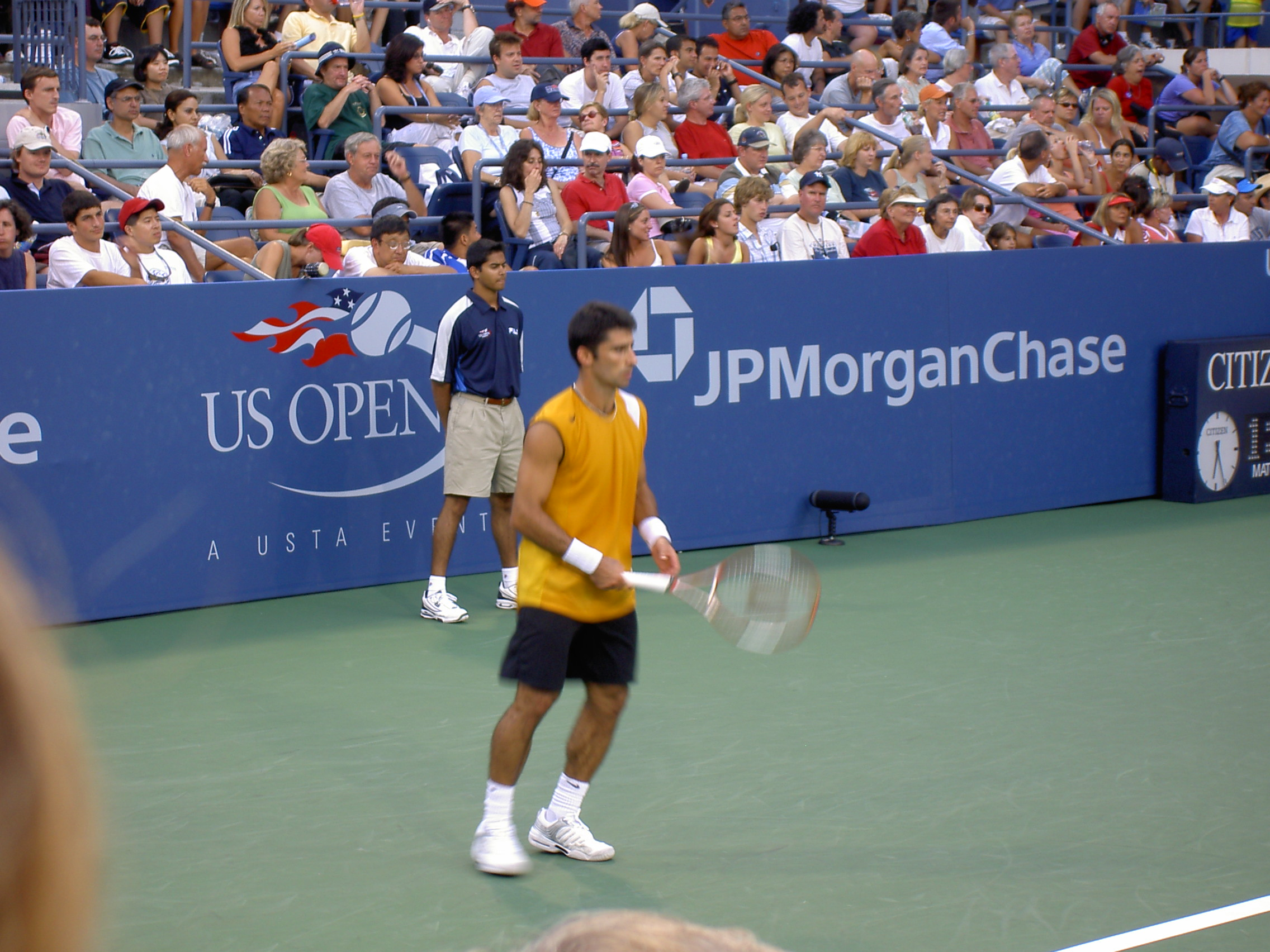
- Country (sports): Armenia
- Residence: Prague, Czech Republic
- Born: 3 June 1973 (age 53) Yerevan, Armenian SSR, Soviet Union
- Height: 1.80 m (5 ft 11 in)
- Turned pro: 1995
- Retired: 2006
- Plays: Right-handed (two-handed backhand)
- Prize money: $2,603,732

Singles
- Career record: 155–209
- Career titles: 1
- Highest ranking: No. 38 (12 January 2004)

Grand Slam singles results
- Australian Open: 4R (2003)
- French Open: 3R (1998, 1999, 2000)
- Wimbledon: 3R (2001, 2003)
- US Open: 4R (2004)

Other tournaments
- Olympic Games: 2R (1996)

Doubles
- Career record: 68–79
- Career titles: 2
- Highest ranking: No. 33 (9 August 2004)

Grand Slam doubles results
- Australian Open: 3R (2004, 2005)
- French Open: QF (2004)
- Wimbledon: 1R (1998, 2003, 2004)
- US Open: 2R (1997)
Medal record
Representing Armenia
Tennis
Summer Universiade
Silver medal – second place	1993 Buffalo	Mixed Doubles
- Last updated on: 15 December 2021.

Sargis Sargsian (Armenian: Սարգիս Սարգսյան, born 3 June 1973) is a former professional tennis player from Armenia. He reached career-high rankings of World No. 38 in singles and World No. 33 in doubles, winning one singles and two doubles titles on the ATP Tour. Sargsian finished 8 seasons in the top 100 ATP year-end rankings.

Sargsian played college tennis with Arizona State University, where he won the 1995 NCAA Men's Singles Championship. Sargsian turned pro in 1995, continuing to be coached with his collegiate coach Steve Bickham.

Sargsian represented Armenia at the 1996, 2000 (where he reached the second round), and the 2004 Summer Olympics. Sargsian retired in 2006. After his career he settled in Florida but moved to Prague, Czech Republic several years ago where he started a tennis program for high-performance players.

== ATP career finals ==
=== Singles: 3 (1 title, 2 runner-ups) ===
Legend Grand Slam Tournaments (0–0) ATP World Tour Finals (0–0) ATP World Tour Masters Series (0–0) ATP Championship Series (0–0) ATP World Series (1–2)	Finals by surface Hard (0–2) Clay (0–0) Grass (1–0) Carpet (0–0)	Finals by setting Outdoors (1–0) Indoors (0–2)

Result	W–L	Date	Tournament	Tier	Surface	Opponent	Score
Win	1–0	Jul 1997	Newport, United States	World Series	Grass	(New Zealand) Brett Steven	7–6^{(7–0)}, 4–6, 7–5
Loss	1–1	Oct 2003	Moscow, Russia	International Series	Hard	(United States) Taylor Dent	6–7^{(5–7)}, 4–6
Loss	1–2	Oct 2003	St. Petersburg, Russia	International Series	Hard	(Brazil) Gustavo Kuerten	3–6, 4–6

=== Doubles: 5 (2 titles, 3 runner-ups) ===
Legend Grand Slam Tournaments (0–0) ATP World Tour Finals (0–0) ATP Masters Series (0–0) ATP Championship Series (0–1) ATP World Series (2–2)	Finals by surface Hard (1–1) Clay (1–1) Grass (0–1) Carpet (0–0)	Finals by setting Outdoors (2–3) Indoors (0–0)

Result	W–L	Date	Tournament	Tier	Surface	Partner	Opponents	Score
Loss	0–1	Jul 1999	Newport, United States	World Series	Grass	(United States) Chris Woodruff	(Australia) Wayne Arthurs (India) Leander Paes	7–6^{(8–6)}, 6–7^{(7–9)}, 3–6
Loss	0–2	Aug 2000	Washington, United States	Championship Series	Hard	(United States) Andre Agassi	(United States) Alex O'Brien (United States) Jared Palmer	5–7, 1–6
Loss	0–3	May 2003	St. Pölten, Austria	International Series	Clay	(Serbia and Montenegro) Nenad Zimonjić	(Sweden) Simon Aspelin (Italy) Massimo Bertolini	4–6, 7–6^{(8–6)}, 3–6
Win	1–3	Jul 2003	Washington, United States	International Series	Hard	(Russia) Yevgeny Kafelnikov	(South Africa) Chris Haggard (Australia) Paul Hanley	7–5, 4–6, 6–2
Win	2–3	Sep 2003	Bucharest, Romania	International Series	Clay	(Germany) Karsten Braasch	(Sweden) Simon Aspelin (South Africa) Jeff Coetzee	7–6^{(9–7)}, 6–2

== ATP Challenger and ITF Futures Finals ==
=== Singles: 11 (4–7) ===
Legend ATP Challenger (4–7) ITF Futures (0–0)	Finals by surface Hard (2–4) Clay (1–2) Grass (1–0) Carpet (0–1)

Result	W–L	Date	Tournament	Tier	Surface	Opponent	Score
Loss	0–1	Jul 1995	Granby, Canada	Challenger	Hard	(United States) Robbie Weiss	2–6, 2–6
Loss	0–2	Apr 1996	West Bloomfield, United States	Challenger	Hard	(South Africa) Grant Stafford	4–6, 2–6
Win	1–2	Jun 1996	Zagreb, Croatia	Challenger	Clay	(Spain) Marcos Górriz	6–4, 6–4
Loss	1–3	Aug 1996	Binghamton, United States	Challenger	Hard	(Italy) Vincenzo Santopadre	3–6, 6–3, 3–6
Win	2–3	Nov 1996	Austin, United States	Challenger	Hard	(Canada) Sebastien Lareau	6–4, 6–4
Win	3–3	Dec 1996	Amarillo, United States	Challenger	Hard	(The Bahamas) Mark Knowles	7–6, 6–3
Loss	3–4	Apr 1997	Paget, Bermuda	Challenger	Clay	(Belgium) Johan Van Herck	1–6, 6–4, 0–6
Loss	3–5	Dec 1997	Burbank, United States	Challenger	Hard	(United States) Andre Agassi	2–6, 1–6
Win	4–5	Jun 1999	Surbiton, United Kingdom	Challenger	Grass	(Czech Republic) Martin Damm	7–6^{(11–9)}, 7–5
Loss	4–6	Oct 1999	Barcelona, Spain	Challenger	Clay	(Spain) Fernando Vicente	2–6, 6–1, 2–6
Loss	4–7	Nov 2001	Bratislava, Slovakia	Challenger	Carpet	(Slovakia) Karol Kucera	1–6, 5–7

=== Doubles: 2 (2–0) ===
Legend ATP Challenger (2–0) ITF Futures (0–0)	Finals by surface Hard (2–0) Clay (0–0) Grass (0–0) Carpet (0–0)

Result	W–L	Date	Tournament	Tier	Surface	Partner	Opponents	Score
Win	1–0	Oct 1996	Monterrey, Mexico	Challenger	Hard	(United States) Michael Sell	(South Africa) Kevin Ullyett (South Africa) Myles Wakefield	6–2, 3–6, 6–3
Win	2–0	Nov 1996	Austin, United States	Challenger	Hard	(United States) Michael Sell	(United States) T. J. Middleton (United States) Bryan Shelton	7–5, 7–6

== Performance timelines ==
Key
W	F	SF	QF	#R	RR	Q#	DNQ	A	NH

(W) winner; (F) finalist; (SF) semifinalist; (QF) quarterfinalist; (#R) rounds 4, 3, 2, 1; (RR) round-robin stage; (Q#) qualification round; (DNQ) did not qualify; (A) absent; (NH) not held; (SR) strike rate (events won / competed); (W–L) win–loss record.

=== Singles ===
Tournament	1995	1996	1997	1998	1999	2000	2001	2002	2003	2004	2005	2006	SR	W–L	Win %
Grand Slam tournaments
Australian Open	A	A	2R	1R	2R	1R	2R	1R	4R	2R	2R	A	0 / 9	8–9	47%
French Open	A	A	1R	3R	3R	3R	2R	1R	2R	1R	1R	A	0 / 9	8–9	47%
Wimbledon	A	A	2R	2R	1R	1R	3R	2R	3R	2R	1R	A	0 / 9	8–9	47%
US Open	3R	Q1	3R	1R	1R	1R	Q1	3R	2R	4R	A	A	0 / 8	10–8	56%
Win–loss	2–1	0–0	4–4	3–4	3–4	2–4	4–3	3–4	7–4	5–4	1–3	0–0	0 / 35	34–35	49%
Olympic Games
Summer Olympics	NH	2R	Not Held			1R	Not Held			1R	NH		0 / 3	1–3	25%
ATP Masters Series
Indian Wells	A	Q2	Q2	A	Q2	A	Q2	Q1	1R	2R	2R	Q1	0 / 3	2–3	40%
Miami	A	Q1	1R	2R	1R	1R	Q2	1R	1R	1R	1R	A	0 / 8	1–8	11%
Monte Carlo	A	A	A	A	A	2R	Q1	A	1R	1R	A	A	0 / 3	1–3	25%
Hamburg	A	A	A	A	A	1R	A	A	2R	2R	A	A	0 / 3	2–3	40%
Rome	A	A	A	A	A	Q2	Q1	A	A	1R	A	A	0 / 1	0–1	0%
Canada	A	A	1R	2R	A	3R	A	A	1R	1R	A	A	0 / 5	3–5	38%
Cincinnati	A	A	1R	Q1	A	A	A	A	Q2	2R	A	A	0 / 2	1–2	33%
Paris	A	Q2	1R	A	2R	Q1	A	Q1	A	2R	A	A	0 / 3	1–3	25%
Stuttgart	A	2R	Q1	A	A	Q2	A	Not Masters Series					0 / 1	1–1	50%
Win–loss	0–0	1–1	0–4	2–2	0–2	3–4	0–0	0–1	1–5	4–8	1–2	0–0	0 / 29	12–29	29%

=== Doubles ===
Tournament	1997	1998	1999	2000	2001	2002	2003	2004	2005	SR	W–L	Win %
Grand Slam tournaments
Australian Open	A	1R	A	A	A	A	2R	3R	3R	0 / 4	5–4	56%
French Open	A	A	A	A	A	A	2R	QF	1R	0 / 3	4–3	57%
Wimbledon	A	1R	A	A	A	A	1R	1R	A	0 / 3	0–3	0%
US Open	2R	A	A	A	A	A	1R	1R	A	0 / 3	1–3	25%
Win–loss	1–1	0–2	0–0	0–0	0–0	0–0	2–4	5–4	2–2	0 / 13	10–13	43%
ATP Masters Series
Indian Wells	A	A	A	A	A	A	A	2R	A	0 / 1	1–1	50%
Miami	A	A	A	A	A	A	A	2R	A	0 / 1	1–1	50%
Monte Carlo	A	A	A	A	A	A	A	1R	A	0 / 1	0–1	0%
Hamburg	A	A	A	A	A	A	A	1R	A	0 / 1	0–1	0%
Rome	A	A	A	Q1	A	A	A	1R	A	0 / 1	0–1	0%
Canada	QF	2R	A	A	A	A	A	1R	A	0 / 3	3–3	50%
Cincinnati	A	Q1	A	A	A	A	2R	SF	A	0 / 2	4–2	67%
Stuttgart	A	A	A	2R	A	Not Masters Series				0 / 1	1–1	50%
Win–loss	2–1	1–1	0–0	1–1	0–0	0–0	1–1	5–7	0–0	0 / 11	10–11	48%
