= David DiLucia =

American tennis player

- Country (sports): United States
- Born: January 15, 1970 (age 56) Norristown, Pennsylvania, U.S.
- Height: 5 ft 8 in (173 cm)
- Plays: Right-handed
- Prize money: $281,857

Singles
- Career record: 6–18
- Career titles: 0
- Highest ranking: No. 248 (October 12, 1998)

Grand Slam singles results
- Australian Open: 1R (1993)
- Wimbledon: 1R (1998)
- US Open: 1R (1992)

Doubles
- Career record: 26–47
- Career titles: 0
- Highest ranking: No. 92 (October 19, 1998)

Grand Slam doubles results
- Australian Open: 1R (1999)
- French Open: 2R (1998)
- Wimbledon: 3R (1993)
- US Open: 2R (1998)

David DiLucia
Medal record

Representing United States

Men's Tennis

Pan American Games
| Gold medal – first place | 1991 Havana | Mixed Doubles |
| Silver medal – second place | 1991 Havana | Men's Singles |

David DiLucia (born January 15, 1970) is a former professional tennis player from the United States.

== Career ==
=== Junior years ===
As a junior, DiLucia had success at the 1987 US Open, where he was a boys' singles semi-finalist. En route to the semi-finals he beat Jonathan Stark, whom he would partner in the boys' doubles event at the 1988 Wimbledon Championships. The pair were semi-finalists. He also played junior Davis Cup for the United States and in 1988 won the Easter Bowl singles title.

=== College career ===
DiLucia, who is a member of the ITA Men's Collegiate Tennis Hall of Fame, was a five-time All-American while playing at the University of Notre Dame. He was a singles All-American in 1990 and then earned All-American honors for both singles and doubles in each of the next two years. By the time he left, he had established several Notre Dame records. Most notably he had managed more singles wins (146) and more doubles wins (219) than any player in the history of Notre Dame tennis. In 1991, he became the first tennis player ever to be named "Athlete of the Year" at Notre Dame. In the 1992 pre-season, DiLucia held top spot on the collegiate ranking for both singles and doubles.

=== Pan American Games ===
At the 1991 Pan American Games, which were held in Cuba, DiLucia was a gold medalist in the mixed doubles partnering Pam Shriver. He was also a singles silver medalist, losing the final to Mexico's Luis Herrera.

=== ATP Tour and Grand Slams ===
DiLucia began playing on the ATP Tour in 1992 and on his tour debut, at the U.S. Pro Indoor tournament, had a win over former top 10 player Kevin Curren. He was eliminated from the tournament by Pete Sampras and would meet Sampras again at the 1992 US Open, losing both matches in straight sets.

In 1993, he played overseas for the first time since turning professional and took part in the main draw of the Australian Open. He was beaten in five sets by Stephane Simian in the first round. At the 1993 Wimbledon Championships, DiLucia and partner Brian MacPhie made the round of 16 in the men's doubles. The pair also reached the semi-finals of the 1993 Hall of Fame Tennis Championships, in Newport.

DiLucia made his third and final Grand Slam appearance in 1998, at the Wimbledon Championships. He lost, in four sets, to 11th seed Jonas Björkman in the opening round. Also in 1998, DiLucia had wins over David Wheaton, Kenneth Carlsen and Ivo Heuberger, to make the quarter-finals at the Japan Open Tennis Championships.

He reached the doubles semi-finals in San Jose twice during his career, both times with Michael Sell, in 1998 and 1999. His only other semi-final appearance was in the doubles at Newport in 1999, partnering Laurence Tieleman.

=== Coaching ===
In 2004, he joined the United States Tennis Association (USTA) as a national coach and remained with them until December 2005, when he left to become the personal coach of Lindsay Davenport.

== Challenger titles ==
=== Doubles: (9) ===
| No. | Date | Tournament | Surface | Partner | Opponents | Score |
|---|---|---|---|---|---|---|
| 1. | 1993 | Montebello, Canada | Hard | (United States) Doug Flach | (South Africa) Lan Bale (Venezuela) Maurice Ruah | 6–3, 6–2 |
| 2. | 1994 | Binghamton, United States | Hard | (United States) Chris Woodruff | (South Africa) Neville Godwin (United States) Scott Sigerseth | 4–6, 6–4, 6–3 |
| 3. | 1995 | Belo Horizonte, Brazil | Hard | (United States) Dan Kronauge | (Brazil) Egberto Caldas (Brazil) Cristiano Testa | 6–7, 6–3, 6–3 |
| 4. | 1996 | Bronx, United States | Hard | (United States) Scott Humphries | (South Africa) Chris Haggard (United Kingdom) Chris Wilkinson | 6–4, 6–1 |
| 5. | 1996 | Urbana, United States | Hard | (United States) Scott Humphries | (United States) Brandon Coupe (United States) Trey Phillips | 6–4, 6–2 |
| 6. | 1997 | Las Vegas, United States | Hard | (United States) Michael Sell | (United States) Paul Goldstein (United States) Jim Thomas | 6–4, 6–4 |
| 7. | 1998 | Salinas, Ecuador | Hard | (United States) Michael Sell | (Argentina) Mariano Hood (Argentina) Sebastián Prieto | 7–6, 6–4 |
| 8. | 1998 | San Antonio, United States | Hard | (United States) Michael Sell | (Australia) Michael Hill (United States) Scott Humphries | 6–3, 6–1 |
| 9. | 1999 | Houston, United States | Hard | (United States) Michael Sell | (Canada) Bobby Kokavec (Canada) Jocelyn Robichaud | 7–6, 6–0 |
