= 2007 Legg Mason Tennis Classic =

- Date: July 30 – August 6
- Edition: 38th
- Category: International Series
- Draw: 64S / 16D
- Prize money: $575,000
- Surface: Hard / outdoor
- Location: Washington, D.C., United States
- Venue: William H.G. FitzGerald Tennis Center

Champions

Singles
- (United States) Andy Roddick

Doubles
- (United States) Bob Bryan / (United States) Mike Bryan
← 2006 ·	Washington Open	· 2008 →

The 2007 Legg Mason Tennis Classic was the 38th edition of this tennis tournament and was played on outdoor hard courts. The tournament was part of the International Series of the 2007 ATP Tour. It was held at the William H.G. FitzGerald Tennis Center in Washington, D.C. from July 30 through August 6, 2007.

== Finals ==
=== Singles ===
(United States) Andy Roddick defeated (United States) John Isner, 6–4, 7–6^{(7–4)}

- It was Roddick's 2nd title of the year and the 23rd of his career. It was his 3rd title at the event, also winning in 2001 and 2005.

=== Doubles ===
(United States) Bob Bryan / (United States) Mike Bryan defeated (Israel) Jonathan Erlich / (Israel) Andy Ram, 7–6^{(7–5)}, 3–6, [10–7]
