= 2004 Legg Mason Tennis Classic =

- Date: August 16–22
- Edition: 35th
- Category: International Series
- Draw: 32S / 16D
- Prize money: $475,000
- Surface: Hard / outdoor
- Location: Washington, D.C., US
- Venue: William H.G. FitzGerald Tennis Center

Champions

Singles
- (Australia) Lleyton Hewitt

Doubles
- (South Africa) Chris Haggard / (South Africa) Robbie Koenig
← 2003 ·	Washington Open	· 2005 →

The 2004 Legg Mason Tenis Classic was the 36th edition of this tennis tournament and was played on outdoor hard courts. The tournament was part of the International Series of the 2004 ATP Tour. It was held at the William H.G. FitzGerald Tennis Center in Washington, D.C. from August 16 through August 22, 2004.

== Finals ==
=== Singles ===
(Australia) Lleyton Hewitt defeated (Luxembourg) Gilles Müller, 6–3, 6–4

- It was Hewitt's 3rd title of the year and the 22nd of his career.

=== Doubles ===
(South Africa) Chris Haggard / (South Africa) Robbie Koenig defeated (United States) Travis Parrott / (Russia) Dmitry Tursunov 7–6^{(7–3)}, 6–1
