= 2002 Legg Mason Tennis Classic – Singles =

Singles
- 2002 Legg Mason Tennis Classic

Final
- Champion: (United States) James Blake
- Runner-up: (Thailand) Paradorn Srichaphan
- Score: 1–6, 7–6^{(7–5)}, 6–4

Details
- Draw: 56 (7Q / 5WC)
- Seeds: 16

Events
Singles	Doubles
- Washington Open

Andy Roddick was the defending champion but lost in the third round to Fernando Meligeni.

James Blake won in the final 1–6, 7–6^{(7–5)}, 6–4 against Paradorn Srichaphan.

== Seeds ==
The top eight seeds received a bye to the second round.

1. (United States) Andre Agassi (semifinals)
2. (United States) Andy Roddick (third round)
3. (Netherlands) Sjeng Schalken (third round)
4. (Spain) Àlex Corretja (quarterfinals)
5. (Chile) Marcelo Ríos (semifinals)
6. (United States) James Blake (champion)
7. (Sweden) Thomas Enqvist (quarterfinals)
8. (Finland) Jarkko Nieminen (quarterfinals)
9. (Chile) Fernando González (second round)
10. (United States) Todd Martin (second round)
11. (United States) Jan-Michael Gambill (first round)
12. (Spain) Fernando Vicente (second round)
13. (Slovakia) Dominik Hrbatý (first round)
14. (Thailand) Paradorn Srichaphan (final)
15. (Czech Republic) Jan Vacek (second round)
16. (Brazil) Fernando Meligeni (quarterfinals)

== Draw ==
Key

- Q = Qualifier
- WC = Wild card
- LL = Lucky loser
- Alt = Alternate
- ITF = ITF entry
- PR = Protected ranking
- SR = Special ranking
- SE = Special exempt
- JE = Junior exempt
- JR = Junior Accelerator Programme entrant
- CO = College Accelerator Programme entrant
- NG = Next Gen Accelerator Program entrant
- w/o = Walkover
- r = Retired
- d = Defaulted

=== Finals ===
Semifinals
1	(United States) Andre Agassi	3	4
6	(United States) James Blake	6	6
14	(Thailand) Paradorn Srichaphan	3	6	6
WC/5	(Chile) Marcelo Ríos	6	2	2

Final
6	(United States) James Blake	1	7^{7}	6
14	(Thailand) Paradorn Srichaphan	6	6^{5}	4

=== Top half ===
==== Section 1 ====
First round
(Israel) N Okun	7^{7}	7^{7}
WC	(United States) P Goldstein	6^{4}	6^{4}
WC	(United States) B Vahaly	6^{6}	6	6
(Croatia) Ž Krajan	7^{8}	4	3
(United States) V Spadea	7	4	2
15	(Czech Republic) J Vacek	5	6	6
12	(Spain) F Vicente	6	6^{2}	6
(Belgium) O Rochus	2	7^{7}	2
(Germany) L Burgsmüller	6	6
(South Africa) N Godwin	3	2
Q	(United States) M Russell	6	6
(Belgium) C Rochus	2	2

Second round
1	(United States) A Agassi	6	6
(Israel) N Okun	2	2
WC	(United States) B Vahaly	6	6
15	(Czech Republic) J Vacek	3	4
12	(Spain) F Vicente	2	1
(Germany) L Burgsmüller	6	6
Q	(United States) M Russell	6^{13}	0
7	(Sweden) T Enqvist	7^{15}	6

Third round
1	(United States) A Agassi	6	7^{7}
WC	(United States) B Vahaly	1	6^{3}
(Germany) L Burgsmüller	3	5
7	(Sweden) T Enqvist	6	7

Quarterfinals
1	(United States) A Agassi	6^{8}	7^{7}	6
7	(Sweden) T Enqvist	7^{10}	6^{5}	3

==== Section 2 ====
First round
(France) A Dupuis	3	2
(Brazil) A Simoni	6	6
(United States) C Mamiit	6^{3}	3
(Slovakia) K Kučera	7^{7}	6
(Netherlands) R Sluiter	6	6
13	(Slovakia) D Hrbatý	4	2
9	(Chile) F González	6	6
(Georgia (country)) I Labadze	4	3
Q	(Zimbabwe) W Black	5	6^{2}
(Argentina) G Coria	7	7^{7}
(Uzbekistan) O Ogorodov	7^{7}	6
Q	(France) J Varlet	6^{3}	4

Second round
4	(Spain) À Corretja	4	6	7^{7}
(Brazil) A Simoni	6	3	6^{5}
(Slovakia) K Kučera	4	6	6
(Netherlands) R Sluiter	6	1	4
9	(Chile) F González	4	6^{3}
(Argentina) G Coria	6	7^{7}
(Uzbekistan) O Ogorodov	4	1
6	(United States) J Blake	6	6

Third round
4	(Spain) À Corretja	6	6
(Slovakia) K Kučera	1	1
(Argentina) G Coria	4	5
6	(United States) J Blake	6	7

Quarterfinals
4	(Spain) À Corretja	4	4
6	(United States) J Blake	6	6

=== Bottom half ===
==== Section 3 ====
First round
Q	(Canada) F Dancevic	6	6^{4}	6
(Russia) N Davydenko	4	7^{7}	3
(Brazil) F Saretta	4	6^{5}
(United States) A Kim	6	7^{7}
(Italy) S Galvani	3	6	3
10	(United States) T Martin	6	3	6
14	(Thailand) P Srichaphan	7^{7}	6
(Italy) A Gaudenzi	6^{5}	2
WC	(United States) T Spracklin	1	1
Q	(United States) K Kim	6	6
(Sweden) A Vinciguerra	4	3
(France) C Pioline	6	6

Second round
8	(Finland) J Nieminen	7	6
Q	(Canada) F Dancevic	5	0
(United States) A Kim	6	7^{7}
10	(United States) T Martin	4	6^{5}
14	(Thailand) P Srichaphan	7^{7}	6
Q	(United States) K Kim	6^{5}	1
(France) C Pioline	6^{5}	1
3	(Netherlands) S Schalken	7^{7}	6

Third round
8	(Finland) J Nieminen	0	6	6
(United States) A Kim	6	4	3
14	(Thailand) P Srichaphan	4	6	6
3	(Netherlands) S Schalken	6	2	4

Quarterfinals
8	(Finland) J Nieminen	3	5
14	(Thailand) P Srichaphan	6	7

==== Section 4 ====
First round
WC	(United States) B Bryan	6	6^{4}	6
Q	(Thailand) D Udomchoke	3	7^{7}	1
(United Kingdom) M Lee	4	6	3
(United States) M Chang	6	4	6
(France) J Golmard	7^{7}	1	6
11	(United States) J-M Gambill	6^{1}	6	4
16	(Brazil) F Meligeni	6	7^{7}
(Japan) T Suzuki	4	6^{1}
(Hungary) A Sávolt	3	7^{7}	6
(Russia) A Stoliarov	6	6^{0}	3
(Denmark) K Carlsen	3	3
Q	(United States) J Gimelstob	6	6

Second round
WC/5	(Chile) M Ríos	7^{9}	3	6
WC	(United States) B Bryan	6^{7}	6	2
(United States) M Chang	5	4
(France) J Golmard	7	6
16	(Brazil) F Meligeni	6^{5}	6	6
(Hungary) A Sávolt	7^{7}	4	3
Q	(United States) J Gimelstob	2	2
2	(United States) A Roddick	6	6

Third round
WC/5	(Chile) M Ríos	6	6
(France) J Golmard	3	1
16	(Brazil) F Meligeni	6	6
2	(United States) A Roddick	4	4

Quarterfinals
WC/5	(Chile) M Ríos	3	6	7
16	(Brazil) F Meligeni	6	4	5
