= 2002 Legg Mason Tennis Classic – Doubles =

Doubles
- 2002 Legg Mason Tennis Classic

Final
- Champions: (Zimbabwe) Wayne Black (Zimbabwe) Kevin Ullyett
- Runners-up: (United States) Bob Bryan (United States) Mike Bryan
- Score: 3–6, 6–3, 7–5

Details
- Draw: 28
- Seeds: 8

Events
Singles	Doubles
← 2001 ·	Washington Open	· 2003 →

Martin Damm and David Prinosil were the defending champions but only Damm competed that year with Cyril Suk.

Damm and Suk lost in the semifinals to Wayne Black and Kevin Ullyett.

Black and Ullyett won in the final 3–6, 6–3, 7–5 against Bob Bryan and Mike Bryan.

== Seeds ==
The top four seeded teams received byes into the second round.

1. (United States) Donald Johnson / (United States) Jared Palmer (quarterfinals)
2. (Zimbabwe) Wayne Black / (Zimbabwe) Kevin Ullyett (champions)
3. (United States) Bob Bryan / (United States) Mike Bryan (final)
4. (Czech Republic) Martin Damm / (Czech Republic) Cyril Suk (semifinals)
5. (South Africa) David Adams / (Netherlands) Sjeng Schalken (quarterfinals)
6. (Argentina) Martín García / (Argentina) Martín Rodríguez (first round)
7. (Argentina) Lucas Arnold / (Spain) Àlex Corretja (quarterfinals)
8. (United States) Justin Gimelstob / (Australia) Michael Hill (semifinals)

== Draw ==
=== Key ===
- Q = Qualifier
- WC = Wild card
- LL = Lucky loser
- Alt = Alternate
- SE = Special exempt
- PR = Protected ranking
- ITF = ITF entry
- JE = Junior exempt
- w/o = Walkover
- r = Retired
- d = Defaulted
- SR = Special ranking

=== Final ===
Semifinals

Final

8
- (United States) Justin Gimelstob
- (Australia) Michael Hill
7^{7}
5
6^{5}

3
- (United States) Bob Bryan
- (United States) Mike Bryan
6^{4}
7
7^{7}

3
- (United States) Bob Bryan
- (United States) Mike Bryan
6
3
5

2
- (Zimbabwe) Wayne Black
- (Zimbabwe) Kevin Ullyett
3
6
7

4
- (Czech Republic) Martin Damm
- (Czech Republic) Cyril Suk
4
6^{3}

2
- (Zimbabwe) Wayne Black
- (Zimbabwe) Kevin Ullyett
6
7^{7}

=== Top half ===
First round

Second round

Quarterfinals

Semifinals

1
- (United States) D Johnson
- (United States) J Palmer
w/o

- (Australia) S Huss
- (Australia) L Pearson
4
7
4

- (Brazil) F Meligeni
- (Spain) F Vicente

- (Brazil) F Meligeni
- (Spain) F Vicente
6
5
6

1
- (United States) D Johnson
- (United States) J Palmer
5
6
4

- (Chile) F González
- (Chile) M Ríos
6
6

8
- (United States) J Gimelstob
- (Australia) M Hill
7
4
6

ALT
- (Belgium) C Rochus
- (Belgium) O Rochus
3
2

- (Chile) F González
- (Chile) M Ríos

- (Australia) J Kerr
- (The Bahamas) M Merklein
4
3

8
- (United States) J Gimelstob
- (Australia) M Hill
w/o

8
- (United States) J Gimelstob
- (Australia) M Hill
6
6

8
- (United States) J Gimelstob
- (Australia) M Hill
7^{7}
5
6^{5}

3
- (United States) B Bryan
- (United States) M Bryan
6^{4}
7
7^{7}

3
- (United States) B Bryan
- (United States) M Bryan
6
6

- (Argentina) G Etlis
- (Argentina) L Lobo
6
2
3

- (Slovakia) D Hrbatý
- (Netherlands) R Krajicek
2
4

- (Slovakia) D Hrbatý
- (Netherlands) R Krajicek
4
6
6

3
- (United States) B Bryan
- (United States) M Bryan
7^{7}
7^{7}

- (United States) J-M Gambill
- (United States) G Oliver
6
6

- (United States) J-M Gambill
- (United States) G Oliver
6^{2}
6^{5}

- (South Africa) N Godwin
- (Japan) T Shimada
3
3

- (United States) J-M Gambill
- (United States) G Oliver
6
7^{7}

- (South Africa) M Barnard
- (United States) J Thomas
7
7^{7}

- (South Africa) M Barnard
- (United States) J Thomas
3
6^{3}

6
- (Argentina) M García
- (Argentina) M Rodríguez
5
6^{5}

=== Bottom half ===
First round

Second round

Quarterfinals

Semifinals

5
- (South Africa) D Adams
- (Netherlands) S Schalken
6
6

- (Sweden) S Aspelin
- (Russia) A Olhovskiy
4
4

5
- (South Africa) D Adams
- (Netherlands) S Schalken
4
6
6

- (Finland) J Nieminen
- (Sweden) A Vinciguerra
3
4

- (South Africa) J Coetzee
- (Australia) N Healey
6
1
2

- (South Africa) J Coetzee
- (Australia) N Healey
6
6

5
- (South Africa) D Adams
- (Netherlands) S Schalken
6^{4}
6
3

- (Switzerland) G Bastl
- (United States) B Coupe
4
6
4

4
- (Czech Republic) M Damm
- (Czech Republic) C Suk
7^{7}
4
6

- (South Africa) C Haggard
- (Sweden) P Nyborg
6
4
6

- (South Africa) C Haggard
- (Sweden) P Nyborg
3
6^{3}

4
- (Czech Republic) M Damm
- (Czech Republic) C Suk
6
7^{7}

4
- (Czech Republic) M Damm
- (Czech Republic) C Suk
4
6^{3}

7
- (Argentina) L Arnold
- (Spain) À Corretja
6
7^{12}

2
- (Zimbabwe) W Black
- (Zimbabwe) K Ullyett
6
7^{7}

WC
- (Canada) F Dancevic
- (United States) A Kim
4
6^{10}

7
- (Argentina) L Arnold
- (Spain) À Corretja
7^{7}
6^{4}
6

WC
- (United States) P Goldstein
- (United States) S Humphries
5
7
4

- (North Macedonia) A Kitinov
- (Brazil) A Simoni
6^{5}
7^{7}
1

- (North Macedonia) A Kitinov
- (Brazil) A Simoni
7
5
6

7
- (Argentina) L Arnold
- (Spain) À Corretja
1
6^{6}

- (United States) J Blake
- (United States) T Blake
6
6

2
- (Zimbabwe) W Black
- (Zimbabwe) K Ullyett
6
7^{8}

- (Chile) J Fillol Jr.
- (Italy) A Gaudenzi
4
3

- (United States) J Blake
- (United States) T Blake
4
2

2
- (Zimbabwe) W Black
- (Zimbabwe) K Ullyett
6
6
