= Andrew Carlson =

Andrew Carlson may refer to:

- Andy Carlson, American violinist
- Andrew Carlson (politician) (born 1974/75), member of the Minnesota House of Representatives
- Andrew Carlson (tennis) (born 1977), American tennis player
