= 2004 Legg Mason Tennis Classic – Singles =

Singles
- 2004 Legg Mason Tennis Classic

Final
- Champion: (Australia) Lleyton Hewitt
- Runner-up: (Luxembourg) Gilles Müller
- Score: 6–3, 6–4

Details
- Draw: 32 (4Q / 3WC)
- Seeds: 8

Events
Singles	Doubles
← 2003 ·	Washington Open	· 2005 →

Tim Henman was the defending champion but chose to participate in the 2004 Summer Olympics.

Lleyton Hewitt won in the final 6–3, 6–4 against Gilles Müller.

== Seeds ==
1. (United States) Andre Agassi (semifinals)
2. (Australia) Lleyton Hewitt (champion)
3. (Netherlands) Sjeng Schalken (first round, retired due to virus)
4. (United States) Robby Ginepri (semifinals)
5. (United States) James Blake (first round)
6. (Spain) Alberto Martín (second round)
7. (France) Cyril Saulnier (quarterfinals)
8. (Russia) Dmitry Tursunov (second round)

== Draw ==
=== Key ===
- Q = Qualifier
- WC = Wild card
- LL = Lucky loser
- Alt = Alternate
- SE = Special exempt
- PR = Protected ranking
- ITF = ITF entry
- JE = Junior exempt
- w/o = Walkover
- r = Retired
- d = Defaulted
- SR = Special ranking

=== Finals ===
Semifinals
1	(United States) Andre Agassi	4	5
(Luxembourg) Gilles Müller	6	7
4	(United States) Robby Ginepri	3	4
2	(Australia) Lleyton Hewitt	6	6

Final
(Luxembourg) Gilles Müller	3	4
2	(Australia) Lleyton Hewitt	6	6

=== Top half ===
First round
1	(United States) A Agassi	6	6
WC	(United States) P Goldstein	4	2
WC	(United States) B Baker	3	6	6^{2}
(Denmark) K Pless	6	3	7^{7}
WC	(United States) D Yoo	2	2
(France) P-H Mathieu	6	6
SE	(Chile) A García	6	6
5	(United States) J Blake	1	4
3	(Netherlands) S Schalken	1	1	r
(Luxembourg) G Müller	6	0
(United States) J-M Gambill	7	6
(Austria) S Koubek	5	4
(United States) J Salzenstein	4	6^{1}
Q	(Switzerland) M Kratochvil	6	7^{7}
(France) O Patience	7	4	4
8	(Russia) D Tursunov	5	6	6

Second round
1	(United States) A Agassi	6	6
(Denmark) K Pless	4	2
(France) P-H Mathieu	7^{7}	6
SE	(Chile) A García	6^{4}	4
(Luxembourg) G Müller	7	5	6
(United States) J-M Gambill	5	7	2
Q	(Switzerland) M Kratochvil	7^{7}	7^{7}
8	(Russia) D Tursunov	6^{5}	6^{4}

Quarterfinals
1	(United States) A Agassi	6	6
(France) P-H Mathieu	4	4
(Luxembourg) G Müller	7	6^{7}	6
Q	(Switzerland) M Kratochvil	5	7^{9}	2

Semifinals
1	(United States) A Agassi	4	5
(Luxembourg) G Müller	6	7

=== Bottom half ===
First round
6	(Spain) A Martín	4	6	7^{7}
(South Africa) W Ferreira	6	4	6^{2}
(Netherlands) R Sluiter	6^{5}	7^{7}	7^{7}
(United States) T Martin	7^{7}	6^{3}	6^{5}
Q	(Serbia and Montenegro) N Zimonjić	7^{9}	5	3
Q	(Israel) H Levy	6^{7}	7	6
(Spain) À Corretja	6^{4}	6	3
4	(United States) R Ginepri	7^{7}	4	6
7	(France) C Saulnier	6	6
(France) A Dupuis	3	4
Q	(Chinese Taipei) J Wang	6	6^{1}	4
(Belgium) G Elseneer	2	7^{7}	6
(Colombia) A Falla	3	6	6
(United States) J Gimelstob	6	4	3
(Denmark) K Carlsen	1	2
2	(Australia) L Hewitt	6	6

Second round
6	(Spain) A Martín	6^{4}	7	6^{2}
(Netherlands) R Sluiter	7^{7}	5	7^{7}
Q	(Israel) H Levy	6	2	1
4	(United States) R Ginepri	4	6	6
7	(France) C Saulnier	6	7^{7}
(Belgium) G Elseneer	3	6^{2}
(Colombia) A Falla	3	2
2	(Australia) L Hewitt	6	6

Quarterfinals
(Netherlands) R Sluiter	3	6^{3}
4	(United States) R Ginepri	6	7^{7}
7	(France) C Saulnier	3	6	6^{5}
2	(Australia) L Hewitt	6	3	7^{7}

Semifinals
4	(United States) R Ginepri	3	4
2	(Australia) L Hewitt	6	6
