= 2003 Legg Mason Tennis Classic – Doubles =

Doubles
- 2003 Legg Mason Tennis Classic

Final
- Champions: (Russia) Yevgeny Kafelnikov (Armenia) Sargis Sargsian
- Runners-up: (South Africa) Chris Haggard (Australia) Paul Hanley
- Score: 7–5, 4–6, 6–2

Details
- Draw: 16
- Seeds: 4

Events
Singles	Doubles
← 2002 ·	Washington Open	· 2004 →

Wayne Black and Kevin Ullyett were the defending champions but lost in the first round to Yevgeny Kafelnikov and Sargis Sargsian.

Kafelnikov and Sargsian won in the final 7–5, 4–6, 6–2 against Chris Haggard and Paul Hanley.

== Seeds ==
1. (United States) Bob Bryan / (United States) Mike Bryan (first round)
2. (Zimbabwe) Wayne Black / (Zimbabwe) Kevin Ullyett (first round)
3. (South Africa) Chris Haggard / (Australia) Paul Hanley (final)
4. (Argentina) Gastón Etlis / (Argentina) Martín Rodríguez (quarterfinals)

== Draw ==
=== Key ===
- Q = Qualifier
- WC = Wild card
- LL = Lucky loser
- Alt = Alternate
- SE = Special exempt
- PR = Protected ranking
- ITF = ITF entry
- JE = Junior exempt
- w/o = Walkover
- r = Retired
- d = Defaulted
- SR = Special ranking

First round
1	(United States) B Bryan (United States) M Bryan	4	6^{5}
(United States) A Roddick (United States) B Vahaly	6	7^{7}
(Sweden) J Landsberg (Argentina) S Roitman	6^{5}	6	6^{2}
WC	(United States) A Carlson (United States) C Groer	7^{7}	1	7^{7}
3	(South Africa) C Haggard (Australia) P Hanley	7	6
(United States) D Johnson (Serbia and Montenegro) N Zimonjić	5	4
(Croatia) M Ančić (Slovakia) K Beck	7^{8}	3	6
ALT	(Chile) H Gamonal (Chile) F González	6^{6}	6	4
WC	(United States) J Blake (United States) T Blake	6^{1}	5
(Australia) N Healey (Australia) J Kerr	7^{7}	7
(United States) B Coupe (United States) J Thomas	4	4
4	(Argentina) G Etlis (Argentina) M Rodríguez	6	6
(France) G Carraz (France) A Clément	6^{2}	6	6^{4}
(United States) G Oliver (Israel) A Ram	7^{7}	4	7^{7}
(Russia) Y Kafelnikov (Armenia) S Sargsian	6	6
2	(Zimbabwe) W Black (Zimbabwe) K Ullyett	4	1

Quarterfinals
(United States) A Roddick (United States) B Vahaly	6	6
WC	(United States) A Carlson (United States) C Groer	4	4
3	(South Africa) C Haggard (Australia) P Hanley	4	7^{8}	6
(Croatia) M Ančić (Slovakia) K Beck	6	6^{6}	4
(Australia) N Healey (Australia) J Kerr	7	6
4	(Argentina) G Etlis (Argentina) M Rodríguez	5	3
(United States) G Oliver (Israel) A Ram	4	5
(Russia) Y Kafelnikov (Armenia) S Sargsian	6	7

Semifinals
(United States) A Roddick (United States) B Vahaly
3	(South Africa) C Haggard (Australia) P Hanley	w/o
(Australia) N Healey (Australia) J Kerr	1	7^{7}	1
(Russia) Y Kafelnikov (Armenia) S Sargsian	6	6^{2}	6

Final
3	(South Africa) C Haggard (Australia) P Hanley	5	6	2
(Russia) Y Kafelnikov (Armenia) S Sargsian	7	4	6
