= 2004 Legg Mason Tennis Classic – Doubles =

Doubles
- 2004 Legg Mason Tennis Classic

Final
- Champions: (South Africa) Chris Haggard (South Africa) Robbie Koenig
- Runners-up: (United States) Travis Parrott (Russia) Dmitry Tursunov
- Score: 7–6^{(7–3)}, 6–1

Details
- Draw: 16
- Seeds: 4

Events
Singles	Doubles
← 2003 ·	Washington Open	· 2005 →

Yevgeny Kafelnikov and Sargis Sargsian were the defending champions, but did not compete this year, with Kafelnikov retired at the end of the 2003 season.

Chris Haggard and Robbie Koenig won the title, defeating Travis Parrott and Dmitry Tursunov 7–6^{(7–3)}, 6–1 in the final. It was the 1st and only title in the year for the pair, and the 5th title for Haggard and 5th and final title for Koenig, in their respective careers.

== Seeds ==
1. (Argentina) Lucas Arnold Ker / (Argentina) Mariano Hood (quarterfinals)
2. (Sweden) Simon Aspelin / (Australia) Todd Perry (first round)
3. (Argentina) Martín García / (Argentina) Sebastián Prieto (semifinals)
4. (United States) Justin Gimelstob / (Serbia and Montenegro) Nenad Zimonjić (quarterfinals)

== Draw ==
=== Key ===
- Q = Qualifier
- WC = Wild card
- LL = Lucky loser
- Alt = Alternate
- SE = Special exempt
- PR = Protected ranking
- ITF = ITF entry
- JE = Junior exempt
- w/o = Walkover
- r = Retired
- d = Defaulted
- SR = Special ranking

=== Draw ===
First round
1	(Argentina) L Arnold Ker (Argentina) M Hood	7^{7}	4	6
(United States) R Ginepri (United States) G Oliver	6^{4}	6	3
(Spain) À Corretja (Spain) A Martín	3	2
(South Africa) C Haggard (South Africa) R Koenig	6	6
3	(Argentina) M García (Argentina) S Prieto	6	7^{7}
(South Africa) J Coetzee (United States) J-M Gambill	4	6^{4}
(Australia) J Kerr (United States) J Thomas	3	6	6
(France) A Dupuis (France) C Saulnier	6	3	3
WC	(United States) R Kendrick (United States) B Vahaly	4	6	7
(Australia) M Hill (South Africa) W Moodie	6	4	5
WC	(United States) Carl Clark (United States) T Spracklin	4	6^{6}
4	(United States) J Gimelstob (Serbia and Montenegro) N Zimonjić	6	7^{8}
(United States) S Humphries (United States) D Johnson	7^{7}	3	4
(United States) T Parrott (Russia) D Tursunov	6^{4}	6	6
(United States) R Leach (United States) B MacPhie	4	6	6
2	(Sweden) S Aspelin (Australia) T Perry	6	3	4

Quarterfinals
1	(Argentina) L Arnold Ker (Argentina) M Hood	3	6	6^{5}
(South Africa) C Haggard (South Africa) R Koenig	6	2	7^{7}
3	(Argentina) M García (Argentina) S Prieto	6	6
(Australia) J Kerr (United States) J Thomas	2	3
WC	(United States) R Kendrick (United States) B Vahaly	7	7^{7}
4	(United States) J Gimelstob (Serbia and Montenegro) N Zimonjić	5	6^{5}
(United States) T Parrott (Russia) D Tursunov	6	7^{8}
(United States) R Leach (United States) B MacPhie	4	6^{6}

Semifinals
(South Africa) C Haggard (South Africa) R Koenig	6	7^{7}
3	(Argentina) M García (Argentina) S Prieto	3	6^{3}
WC	(United States) R Kendrick (United States) B Vahaly	4	6	1
(United States) T Parrott (Russia) D Tursunov	6	3	6

Final
(South Africa) C Haggard (South Africa) R Koenig	7^{7}	6
(United States) T Parrott (Russia) D Tursunov	6^{3}	1
