= 2003 Legg Mason Tennis Classic – Singles =

Singles
- 2003 Legg Mason Tennis Classic

Final
- Champion: (United Kingdom) Tim Henman
- Runner-up: (Chile) Fernando González
- Score: 6–3, 6–4

Details
- Draw: 48 (6Q / 4WC)
- Seeds: 16

Events
Singles	Doubles
- Washington Open

James Blake was the defending champion but lost in the quarterfinals to Andre Agassi.

Tim Henman won in the final 6–3, 6–4 against Fernando González.

== Seeds ==
All sixteen seeds received a bye to the second round.

1. (United States) Andre Agassi (semifinals)
2. (United States) Andy Roddick (semifinals)
3. (Thailand) Paradorn Srichaphan (quarterfinals)
4. (Chile) Fernando González (final)
5. (Russia) Yevgeny Kafelnikov (third round)
6. (United States) James Blake (quarterfinals)
7. (Belarus) Max Mirnyi (quarterfinals)
8. (Russia) Nikolay Davydenko (third round)
9. (France) Arnaud Clément (second round)
10. (United Kingdom) Tim Henman (champion)
11. (United States) Mardy Fish (quarterfinals)
12. (Chile) ~~Nicolás Massú~~ (withdrew)
13. (Armenia) Sargis Sargsian (third round)
14. (United Kingdom) Greg Rusedski (third round)
15. (Croatia) Mario Ančić (third round)
16. (United States) Brian Vahaly (third round)

== Draw ==
Key

- Q = Qualifier
- WC = Wild card
- LL = Lucky loser
- Alt = Alternate
- ITF = ITF entry
- PR = Protected ranking
- SR = Special ranking
- SE = Special exempt
- JE = Junior exempt
- JR = Junior Accelerator Programme entrant
- CO = College Accelerator Programme entrant
- NG = Next Gen Accelerator Program entrant
- w/o = Walkover
- r = Retired
- d = Defaulted

=== Finals ===
Semifinals
1	(United States) Andre Agassi	6	4	6^{5}
4	(Chile) Fernando González	3	6	7^{7}
10	(United Kingdom) Tim Henman	1	6	7^{7}
2	(United States) Andy Roddick	6	3	6^{1}

Final
4	(Chile) Fernando González	3	4
10	(United Kingdom) Tim Henman	6	6

=== Top half ===
==== Section 1 ====
First round
(Switzerland) I Heuberger	6	6
Q	(United States) T Blake	3	3
(Czech Republic) J Vaněk	7^{7}	6
(Chile) H Gamonal	6^{5}	3
(United States) R Kendrick	3	2
(Germany) L Burgsmüller	6	6
(France) G Carraz	7^{7}	6
(Israel) H Levy	6^{2}	4

Second round
1	(United States) A Agassi	6	6
(Switzerland) I Heuberger	3	1
(Czech Republic) J Vaněk	3	4
13	(Armenia) S Sargsian	6	6
9	(France) A Clément	6	5	1
(Germany) L Burgsmüller	3	7	6
(France) G Carraz	6^{6}	4
6	(United States) J Blake	7^{8}	6

Third round
1	(United States) A Agassi	6	6
13	(Armenia) S Sargsian	3	2
(Germany) L Burgsmüller	6	5	4
6	(United States) J Blake	3	7	6

Quarterfinals
1	(United States) A Agassi	3	7	6
6	(United States) J Blake	6	5	3

==== Section 2 ====
First round
(Paraguay) R Delgado	6	6^{4}	3
Q	(France) J Benneteau	2	7^{7}	6
(Belgium) G Elseneer	3	6^{8}
(United States) J Morrison	6	7^{10}
WC	(United States) A Carlson	1	3
WC	(United States) M Bryan	6	6
(United States) A Kim	6	3	7^{7}
Q	(United Kingdom) M Maclagan	4	6	6^{3}

Second round
4	(Chile) F González	6	6
Q	(France) J Benneteau	2	4
(United States) J Morrison	2	7^{7}	2
15	(Croatia) M Ančić	6	6^{3}	6
LL	(Israel) N Okun	1	7^{11}	6^{4}
WC	(United States) M Bryan	6	6^{9}	7^{7}
(United States) A Kim	6	3	4
7	(Belarus) M Mirnyi	4	6	6

Third round
4	(Chile) F González	7	7^{7}
15	(Croatia) M Ančić	5	6^{5}
WC	(United States) M Bryan	1	3
7	(Belarus) M Mirnyi	6	6

Quarterfinals
4	(Chile) F González	7^{7}	6
7	(Belarus) M Mirnyi	6^{3}	2

=== Bottom half ===
==== Section 3 ====
First round
Q	(Canada) S Larose	2	7^{7}	6
Q	(France) F Serra	6	6^{4}	2
(United States) P Goldstein	6	6
WC	(United States) B Baker	2	2
(Argentina) S Roitman	6	7
(Australia) P Luczak	3	5
(South Africa) W Moodie	6^{1}	6	5
(France) C Saulnier	7^{7}	4	7

Second round
8	(Russia) N Davydenko	6	6
Q	(Canada) S Larose	4	3
(United States) P Goldstein	7	4	3
10	(United Kingdom) T Henman	5	6	6
16	(United States) B Vahaly	6	3	6
(Argentina) S Roitman	4	6	0
(France) C Saulnier	4	7^{8}	1
3	(Thailand) P Srichaphan	6	6^{6}	6

Third round
8	(Russia) N Davydenko	3	4
10	(United Kingdom) T Henman	6	6
16	(United States) B Vahaly	6^{3}	4
3	(Thailand) P Srichaphan	7^{7}	6

Quarterfinals
10	(United Kingdom) T Henman	7^{7}	7
3	(Thailand) P Srichaphan	6^{5}	5

==== Section 4 ====
First round
Q	(Australia) J Crabb	4	3
(Sweden) T Enqvist	6	6
(Australia) S Draper	6	6
(United States) T Martin	3	4
(Peru) I Miranda	3	6	7^{7}
(Slovakia) K Beck	6	3	6^{3}
(United States) B Bryan	7^{7}	6
WC	(United States) A Delić	6^{4}	4

Second round
5	(Russia) Y Kafelnikov	6	2	6
(Sweden) T Enqvist	3	6	3
(Australia) S Draper	2	5
11	(United States) M Fish	6	7
14	(United Kingdom) G Rusedski	6	6
(Peru) I Miranda	2	4
(United States) B Bryan	6^{5}	4
2	(United States) A Roddick	7^{7}	6

Third round
5	(Russia) Y Kafelnikov	4	6	3
11	(United States) M Fish	6	3	6
14	(United Kingdom) G Rusedski	3	6^{4}
2	(United States) A Roddick	6	7^{7}

Quarterfinals
11	(United States) M Fish	1	4
2	(United States) A Roddick	6	6
