= 2003 Legg Mason Tennis Classic =

- Date: July 28 – August 3
- Edition: 35th
- Category: International Series
- Draw: 48S / 16D
- Prize money: $575,000
- Surface: Hard / outdoor
- Location: Washington, D.C., US
- Venue: William H.G. FitzGerald Tennis Center

Champions

Singles
- (United Kingdom) Tim Henman

Doubles
- (Russia) Yevgeny Kafelnikov / (Armenia) Sargis Sargsian
← 2002 ·	Washington Open	· 2004 →

The 2003 Legg Mason Tennis Classic was a men's tennis tournament played on outdoor hard courts at the William H.G. FitzGerald Tennis Center in Washington, D.C. in the United States and was part of the International Series of the 2003 ATP Tour.It was the 35th edition of the tournament and ran from July 28 through August 3, 2003. Tenth-seeded Tim Henman won the singles title.

== Finals ==
=== Singles ===
(United Kingdom) Tim Henman defeated (Chile) Fernando González 6–3, 6–4

- It was Henman's 1st singles title of the year and the 10th of his career.

=== Doubles ===
(Russia) Yevgeny Kafelnikov / (Armenia) Sargis Sargsian defeated (South Africa) Chris Haggard / (Australia) Paul Hanley 7–5, 4–6, 6–2

- It was Kafelnikov's 2nd title of the year and the 53rd of his career. It was Sargsian's 1st title of the year and the 2nd of his career.
