= 2002 Legg Mason Tennis Classic =

- Date: August 12–18
- Edition: 34th
- Category: International Series Gold
- Draw: 56S / 28D
- Prize money: $700,000
- Surface: Hard / outdoor
- Location: Washington, D.C., US
- Venue: William H.G. FitzGerald Tennis Center

Champions

Singles
- (United States) James Blake

Doubles
- (Zimbabwe) Wayne Black / (Zimbabwe) Kevin Ullyett
← 2001 ·	Washington Open	· 2003 →

The 2002 Legg Mason Tennis Classic was a tennis tournament played on outdoor hard courts at the William H.G. FitzGerald Tennis Center in Washington, D.C. in the United States and was part of the International Series Gold of the 2002 ATP Tour. The tournament ran from August 12 through August 18, 2002.

== Finals ==
=== Singles ===
(United States) James Blake defeated (Thailand) Paradorn Srichaphan 1–6, 7–6^{(7–5)}, 6–4

- It was Blake's 1st singles title of his career.

=== Doubles ===
(Zimbabwe) Wayne Black / (Zimbabwe) Kevin Ullyett defeated (United States) Bob Bryan / (United States) Mike Bryan 3–6, 6–3, 7–5

- It was Black's 4th title of the year and the 11th of his career. It was Ullyett's 4th title of the year and the 17th of his career.
