= 2007 Legg Mason Tennis Classic – Doubles =

Doubles
- 2007 Legg Mason Tennis Classic

Final
- Champion: (United States) Bob Bryan (United States) Mike Bryan
- Runner-up: (Israel) Jonathan Erlich (Israel) Andy Ram
- Score: 7–6^{(7–5)}, 3–6, [10–7]

Details
- Draw: 16
- Seeds: 4

Events
Singles	Doubles
- Washington Open

Bob Bryan and Mike Bryan were the defending champions. They successfully defended their title, defeating Jonathan Erlich and Andy Ram 7–6^{(7–5)}, 3–6, [10–7] in the final.

== Seeds ==
1. (United States) Bob Bryan / (United States) Mike Bryan (champions)
2. (Czech Republic) Martin Damm / (India) Leander Paes (semifinals)
3. (Australia) Paul Hanley / (Zimbabwe) Kevin Ullyett (semifinals)
4. (Israel) Jonathan Erlich / (Israel) Andy Ram (final)

== Draw ==
Key

- Q = Qualifier
- WC = Wild card
- LL = Lucky loser
- Alt = Alternate
- ITF = ITF entry
- PR = Protected ranking
- SR = Special ranking
- SE = Special exempt
- JE = Junior exempt
- JR = Junior Accelerator Programme entrant
- CO = College Accelerator Programme entrant
- NG = Next Gen Accelerator Program entrant
- w/o = Walkover
- r = Retired
- d = Defaulted

=== Draw ===
First round
1	(United States) B Bryan (United States) M Bryan	6	6
(United States) P Goldstein (United States) T Phillips	3	4
(South Africa) W Moodie (Australia) T Perry	7^{7}	2	[10]
(United States) E Butorac (United Kingdom) J Murray	6^{4}	6	[6]
3	(Australia) P Hanley (Zimbabwe) K Ullyett	6	6
(South Africa) J Coetzee (Netherlands) R Wassen	4	2
(India) M Bhupathi (United Kingdom) T Henman	6	7
(South Korea) H-t Lee (United States) M Russell	2	5
WC	(United States) S Lipsky (United States) D Martin	6	1	[8]
(Germany) B Becker (Russia) I Kunitsyn	1	6	[10]
(Australia) J Kerr (United States) J Thomas	3	2
4	(Israel) J Erlich (Israel) A Ram	6	6
(Brazil) M Melo (Brazil) A Sá	1	7^{8}	[10]
(South Africa) C Haggard (Croatia) I Karlović	6	6^{6}	[12]
WC	(India) S Devvarman (United States) J Isner	2	6	[8]
2	(Czech Republic) M Damm (India) L Paes	6	3	[10]

Quarterfinals
1	(United States) B Bryan (United States) M Bryan	6	6
(South Africa) W Moodie (Australia) T Perry	4	4
3	(Australia) P Hanley (Zimbabwe) K Ullyett	6	7
(India) M Bhupathi (United Kingdom) T Henman	4	5
(Germany) B Becker (Russia) I Kunitsyn	2	1
4	(Israel) J Erlich (Israel) A Ram	6	6
(South Africa) C Haggard (Croatia) I Karlović	7^{7}	3	[8]
2	(Czech Republic) M Damm (India) L Paes	6^{3}	6	[10]

Semifinals
1	(United States) B Bryan (United States) M Bryan	6	6
3	(Australia) P Hanley (Zimbabwe) K Ullyett	1	1
4	(Israel) J Erlich (Israel) A Ram	6^{4}	7^{7}	[10]
2	(Czech Republic) M Damm (India) L Paes	7^{7}	6^{5}	[2]

Final
1	(United States) B Bryan (United States) M Bryan	7^{7}	3	[10]
4	(Israel) J Erlich (Israel) A Ram	6^{5}	6	[7]
