= 2007 Legg Mason Tennis Classic – Singles =

Singles
- 2007 Legg Mason Tennis Classic

Final
- Champion: (United States) Andy Roddick
- Runner-up: (United States) John Isner
- Score: 6–4, 7–6^{(7–4)}

Details
- Draw: 48 (4Q / 4WC)
- Seeds: 16

Events
Singles	Doubles
← 2006 ·	Washington Open	· 2008 →

The 2007 Legg Mason Tennis Classic was the 38th edition of the Legg Mason Tennis Classic and it took place from July 30 - August 6, 2007.

Arnaud Clément was the defending champion, but lost in the second round to Thomas Johansson.

Andy Roddick won the title, defeating John Isner 6–4, 7–6^{(7–4)} in the final.

== Seeds ==
1. (United States) Andy Roddick (champion)
2. (Germany) Tommy Haas (quarterfinals)
3. (Russia) Marat Safin (quarterfinals)
4. (France) Arnaud Clément (second round)
5. (South Korea) Lee Hyung-Taik (quarterfinals)
6. (United States) Mardy Fish (second round)
7. (Croatia) Ivo Karlović (semifinals)
8. (Germany) Benjamin Becker (second round)
9. (France) Gaël Monfils (semifinals)
10. (Argentina) Juan Martín del Potro (second round)
11. (France) Julien Benneteau (third round)
12. (United States) Vincent Spadea (third round)
13. (United States) Amer Delic (second round)
14. (France) Michaël Llodra (second round)
15. (Czech Republic) Radek Štěpánek (third round)
16. (United States) Michael Russell (third round)

== Draw ==
=== Key ===
- Q = Qualifier
- WC = Wild card
- LL = Lucky loser
- Alt = Alternate
- ITF = ITF entry
- PR = Protected ranking
- SR = Special ranking
- SE = Special exempt
- JE = Junior exempt
- JR = Junior Accelerator Programme entrant
- CO = College Accelerator Programme entrant
- NG = Next Gen Accelerator Program entrant
- w/o = Walkover
- r = Retired
- d = Defaulted

=== Finals ===
Quarterfinals
1	(United States) Andy Roddick	7^{8}	6
5	(South Korea) Lee Hyung-Taik	6^{6}	2
(Chile) Paul Capdeville	6	3	6^{5}
7	(Croatia) Ivo Karlović	4	6	7^{7}
9	(France) Gaël Monfils	6	7
3	(Russia) Marat Safin	3	5
WC	(United States) John Isner	6	6^{6}	7^{7}
2/WC	(Germany) Tommy Haas	4	7^{8}	6^{5}

Semifinals
1	(United States) Andy Roddick	7^{9}	7^{7}
(Croatia) Ivo Karlović	6^{7}	6^{5}
9	(France) Gaël Monfils	7^{7}	6^{1}	6^{2}
WC	(United States) John Isner	6^{4}	7^{7}	7^{7}

Final
1	(United States) Andy Roddick	6	7^{7}
WC	(United States) John Isner	4	6^{4}

=== Earlier rounds ===
==== Section 1 ====
First round
(Czech Republic) T Zíb	7^{7}	6
(United States) K Kim	6^{2}	4
(United States) P Goldstein	6	6
Q	(India) S Dev Varman	4	2
(Russia) T Gabashvili	6^{4}	3
SE	(Japan) K Nishikori	7^{7}	6
(Russia) I Kunitsyn	6^{3}	6	6
(France) S Grosjean	7^{7}	4	3

Second round
1	(United States) A Roddick	6	6
(Czech Republic) T Zíb	4	2
(United States) P Goldstein	3	6	4
15	(Czech Republic) R Štěpánek	6	4	6
11	(France) J Benneteau	6	6
SE	(Japan) K Nishikori	2	3
(Russia) I Kunitsyn	7^{9}	3	1
5	(South Korea) L Hyung-Taik	6^{7}	6	6

Third round
1	(United States) A Roddick	6	1	7
15	(Czech Republic) R Štěpánek	3	6	5
11	(France) J Benneteau	6	2	3
5	(South Korea) L Hyung-Taik	2	6	6

Quarterfinals
1	(United States) A Roddick	7^{8}	6
5	(South Korea) L Hyung-Taik	6^{6}	2

==== Section 2 ====
First round
(Colombia) S Giraldo	6^{7}	7^{7}	4
(Sweden) T Johansson	7^{9}	6^{5}	6
(Serbia) I Bozoljac	6	3	0
(Chile) P Capdeville	4	6	6
WC	(United States) R Sweeting	3	4
(South Africa) W Moodie	6	6
(Russia) E Korolev	6	6
(Brazil) R Mello	4	4

Second round
4	(France) A Clément	6	3	4
(Sweden) T Johansson	1	6	6
(Chile) P Capdeville	7	7
13	(United States) A Delic	6	5
12	(United States) V Spadea	7^{7}	7^{7}
(South Africa) W Moodie	6^{5}	6^{3}
(Russia) E Korolev	3	3
7	(Croatia) I Karlović	6	6

Third round
(Sweden) T Johansson	6^{5}	3
(Chile) P Capdeville	7^{7}	6
12	(United States) V Spadea	2	4
7	(Croatia) I Karlović	6	6

Quarterfinals
(Chile) P Capdeville	6	3	6^{5}
7	(Croatia) I Karlović	4	6	7^{7}

==== Section 3 ====
First round
(Germany) M Berrer	6	6
Q	(Switzerland) G Bastl	3	2
(Greece) K Economidis	4	3
WC	(Slovakia) M Kližan	6	6
(United Kingdom) A Bogdanovic	4	2
(Netherlands) R Haase	6	6
(Australia) N Healey	3	1^{r}
(Czech Republic) J Hernych	6	1

Second round
6	(United States) M Fish	6^{4}	4
(Germany) M Berrer	7^{7}	6
WC	(Slovakia) M Kližan	6^{5}	4
9	(France) G Monfils	7^{7}	6
14	(France) M Llodra	2	7^{9}	6^{4}
(Netherlands) R Haase	6	6^{7}	7^{7}
(Czech Republic) J Hernych	2	6	2
3	(Russia) M Safin	6	2	6

Third round
(Germany) M Berrer	7^{7}	3	3
9	(France) G Monfils	6^{5}	6	6
(Netherlands) R Haase	5	7^{7}	5
3	(Russia) M Safin	7	6^{2}	7

Quarterfinals
9	(France) G Monfils	6	7
3	(Russia) M Safin	3	5

==== Section 4 ====
First round
WC	(United States) J Isner	4	6	7^{7}
(United Kingdom) T Henman	6	4	6^{4}
(Chile) A García	6	3	0
Q	(United States) W Odesnik	4	6	6
(Czech Republic) J Vaněk	6	3	3
Q	(South Africa) W Whitehouse	3	6	6
(Colombia) A Falla	3	6	7
(United States) R Kendrick	6	2	5

Second round
8	(Germany) B Becker	6	5	6^{6}
WC	(United States) J Isner	3	7	7^{8}
Q	(United States) W Odesnik	3	7^{12}	6
10	(Argentina) JM Del Potro	6	6^{10}	3
16	(United States) M Russell	7^{7}	4
Q	(South Africa) W Whitehouse	6^{1}	1^{r}
(Colombia) A Falla	3	2
2/WC	(Germany) T Haas	6	6

Third round
WC	(United States) J Isner	6^{4}	7^{7}	7^{7}
Q	(United States) W Odesnik	7^{7}	6^{3}	6^{2}
16	(United States) M Russell	3	4
2/WC	(Germany) T Haas	6	6

Quarterfinals
WC	(United States) J Isner	6	6^{6}	7^{7}
2/WC	(Germany) T Haas	4	7^{8}	6^{5}
