= Trevor Spracklin =

American tennis player

- Country (sports): United States
- Born: December 17, 1977 (age 48)
- Height: 6 ft 3 in (191 cm)
- Prize money: $14,671

Singles
- Career record: 0–1
- Highest ranking: No. 734 (March 31, 2003)

Doubles
- Career record: 1–3
- Highest ranking: No. 319 (June 20, 2005)

Trevor Spracklin (born December 17, 1977) is an American former professional tennis player.

Spracklin turned professional in 2002 after a collegiate career at William & Mary, where he accumulated the most wins of any player in the program's history. He was the Colonial Athletic Association Player of the Year in 1999.

On the ATP Tour, Spracklin made his only singles main draw appearance as a wildcard for the 2002 Legg Mason Tennis Classic and was beaten in the first round by qualifier Kevin Kim. He reached his career best singles world ranking of 734 in 2003. As a doubles player he was ranked as high as 319 in the world and won six ITF Futures titles.

== ITF Futures titles ==
=== Doubles: (6) ===
No.	Date	Tournament	Surface	Partner	Opponents	Score
1.	May 2002	Jamaica F5, Montego Bay	Hard	(United States) Matt Daly	(Canada) Simon Larose (United States) Kiantki Thomas	6–2, 7–6^{(6)}
2.	Aug 2002	Jamaica F12, Montego Bay	Hard	(United States) Travis Parrott	(Indonesia) Peter Handoyo (Japan) Hiroki Kondo	6–3, 3–6, 6–3
3.	Sep 2003	Jamaica F7, Montego Bay	Hard	(United States) Andrew Carlson	(Slovakia) Ján Krošlák (Slovakia) David Sebok	6–1, 6–4
4.	Aug 2004	USA F22, Decatur	Hard	(United States) Michael Yani	(Australia) Raphael Durek (Australia) Adam Feeney	7–5, 6–3
5.	Sep 2004	Ecuador F3, Guayaquil	Hard	(United States) Justin Slattery	(Ecuador) David González (Ecuador) José Ycaza	6–2, 6–2
6.	May 2005	Thailand F2, Phuket	Hard	(Brazil) Josh Goffi	(Indonesia) Suwandi (Indonesia) Bonit Wiryawan	4–6, 6–3, 7–5
