= Andrew Carlson (tennis) =

American tennis player

- Country (sports): United States
- Born: August 18, 1977 (age 49) San Diego, U.S.
- Plays: Left-handed

Singles
- Career record: 0–1
- Highest ranking: No. 833 (Mar 1, 2004)

Doubles
- Career record: 1–1
- Highest ranking: No. 475 (Jul 26, 2004)

Andrew Carlson (born August 18, 1977) is an American former professional tennis player.

A left-handed player from Maryland, Carlson competed in collegiate tennis for Ohio State University.

Carlson made an ATP Tour main draw appearance at the 2003 Legg Mason Tennis Classic, where he lost in the first round to Mike Bryan. He was a quarter-finalist in the doubles draw, partnering Chris Groer.

In 2021 he was appointed as the head coach of the men's and women's tennis at Kenyon College.

== ITF Futures titles ==
=== Doubles: (1) ===
No.	Date	Tournament	Surface	Partner	Opponents	Score
1.	Sep 2003	Jamaica F7, Montego Bay	Hard	(United States) Trevor Spracklin	(Slovakia) Ján Krošlák (Slovakia) David Sebok	6–1, 6–4
