= Alex Kim =

American tennis player (born 1978)

- Country (sports): United States
- Born: December 20, 1978 (age 47) Silver Spring, Maryland, United States
- Height: 5 ft 9 in (175 cm)
- Turned pro: 2000
- Plays: Right-handed
- Prize money: $281,041

Singles
- Career record: 8–26
- Career titles: 0
- Highest ranking: No. 106 (10 June 2002)

Grand Slam singles results
- Australian Open: 3R (2002)
- French Open: 1R (2003)
- Wimbledon: Q1 (2003)
- US Open: 1R (2000, 2002, 2003)

Doubles
- Career record: 0–5
- Career titles: 0
- Highest ranking: No. 264 (20 October 2003)

Grand Slam doubles results
- US Open: 1R (2002, 2003)
Medal record
Men's tennis
Representing United States
Pan American Games
Bronze medal – third place	2003 Santo Domingo	Men's singles
- Last updated on: 7 April 2023.

Alex Kim (born December 20, 1978) is a professional tennis player from the United States.

== Early career ==
In the 1996 US Open, Kim and Mexico's Mariano Sánchez made the boys' doubles semi-finals, where they lost to the Bryan brothers.

He began playing collegiate tennis in 1998, for Stanford University. The American was a member of the championship winning Stanford sides of 1998 and 2000. In the latter year, he also won the NCAA Division 1 singles title and was an All-American. He and teammate Geoff Abrams formed the top-ranked doubles team in the nation in 2000, and were named the ITA National Doubles Team of the Year. He was inducted into the Stanford Athletic Hall of Fame in 2011.

== ATP Tour ==
Given a wildcard entry, Kim made his first Grand Slam appearance in 2000, at the US Open. He had the misfortune of being drawn against world number one Andre Agassi in the first round and lost in straight sets. In June 2000, he won the doubles title with Geoff Abrams at the USTA Chandler Cup Futures.

The next time that he played in a Grand Slam event, the 2002 Australian Open, he put in the best performance of his career, starting with an opening round win over Davide Sanguinetti. Despite being ranked outside of the world's top 200, Kim managed to defeat fourth seed Yevgeny Kafelnikov in the second round, without dropping a set. In the third round, he was eliminated by the only other qualifier remaining in the draw, Fernando González.

He also played at the US Open in 2002, but lost in the first round to Greg Rusedski. In Washington's Legg Mason Tennis Classic that year, he claimed a win over another big name player, 10th seed Todd Martin. He was unable to get past Jarkko Nieminen in the round of 16.

In 2003, he played in three Grand Slam tournaments, but lost in the opening round of each. He was beaten by Scott Draper in the Australian Open, squandered a two set lead in losing to Mark Philippoussis in the French Open and was defeated by Younes El Aynaoui in the US Open.

Kim was a joint bronze medalist in the men's singles event at the 2003 Pan American Games, which were held in the Dominican Republic. He lost in the semi-finals to Marcelo Ríos, in a match decided by two tiebreaks.

As a doubles player, Kim competed in the 2002 US Open with Kevin Kim (who is of no relation) and with Jeff Salzenstein in the 2003 US Open. He and his partner lost in the first round of each.

== ATP Challenger and ITF Futures finals ==
=== Singles: 9 (4–5) ===
Legend ATP Challenger (3–3) ITF Futures (1–2)	Finals by surface Hard (3–3) Clay (1–2) Grass (0–0) Carpet (0–0)

Result	W–L	Date	Tournament	Tier	Surface	Opponent	Score
Win	1–0	Jun 2000	USA F15, Berkley	Futures	Hard	(Republic of Ireland) Scott Barron	6–3, 7–5
Loss	1–1	Dec 2000	USA F29, Laguna Niguel	Futures	Hard	(South Africa) Justin Bower	5–7, 0–6
Loss	1–2	Jun 2001	USA F15, Sunnyvale	Futures	Hard	(United States) Robby Ginepri	4–6, 3–6
Win	2–2	Oct 2001	Kerrville, United States	Challenger	Hard	(United States) Mardy Fish	6–3, 3–6, 6–4
Win	3–2	May 2002	Birmingham, United States	Challenger	Clay	(Philippines) Cecil Mamiit	7–6^{(11–9)}, 6–2
Loss	3–3	May 2002	Rocky Mount, United States	Challenger	Clay	(United States) Robby Ginepri	3–6, 4–6
Loss	3–4	May 2003	Birmingham, United States	Challenger	Clay	(Spain) Óscar Hernández	2–6, 1–6
Loss	3–5	Jun 2003	Tallahassee, United States	Challenger	Hard	(United States) Paul Goldstein	6–2, 2–6, 0–4 ret.
Win	4–5	Oct 2003	Fresno, United States	Challenger	Hard	(United States) Jeff Morrison	7–5, 7–6^{(8–6)}

=== Doubles: 3 (2–1) ===
Legend ATP Challenger (1–1) ITF Futures (1–0)	Finals by surface Hard (2–1) Clay (0–0) Grass (0–0) Carpet (0–0)

Result	W–L	Date	Tournament	Tier	Surface	Partner	Opponents	Score
Win	1–0	Jun 2000	USA F15, Berkley	Futures	Hard	(United States) Geoff Abrams	(India) Fazaluddin Syed (China) Ben-Qiang Zhu	6–2, 7–5
Loss	1–1	Jan 2000	Waikoloa, United States	Challenger	Hard	(United States) Levar Harper-Griffith	(United States) Diego Ayala (United States) Robert Kendrick	6–4, 6–7^{(2–7)}, 2–6
Win	2–1	Sep 2003	Seoul, South Korea	Challenger	Hard	(South Korea) Lee Hyung-taik	(Russia) Alex Bogomolov Jr (United States) Jeff Salzenstein	1–6, 6–1, 6–4

== Performance timeline ==
Key
W	F	SF	QF	#R	RR	Q#	DNQ	A	NH

(W) winner; (F) finalist; (SF) semifinalist; (QF) quarterfinalist; (#R) rounds 4, 3, 2, 1; (RR) round-robin stage; (Q#) qualification round; (DNQ) did not qualify; (A) absent; (NH) not held; (SR) strike rate (events won / competed); (W–L) win–loss record.

=== Singles ===
Tournament	2000	2001	2002	2003	2004	SR	W–L	Win%
Grand Slam tournaments
Australian Open	A	A	3R	1R	Q1	0 / 2	2–2	50%
French Open	A	A	Q2	1R	Q2	0 / 1	0–1	0%
Wimbledon	A	A	A	Q1	A	0 / 0	0–0	–
US Open	1R	Q1	1R	1R	A	0 / 3	0–3	0%
Win–loss	0–1	0–0	2–2	0–3	0–0	0 / 6	2–6	25%
ATP World Tour Masters 1000
Indian Wells	A	A	A	A	Q2	0 / 0	0–0	–
Miami	A	A	Q1	Q2	Q1	0 / 0	0–0	–
Canada	A	A	1R	A	A	0 / 1	0–1	0%
Cincinnati	Q1	A	Q1	A	A	0 / 0	0–0	–
Win–loss	0–0	0–0	0–1	0–0	0–0	0 / 1	0–1	0%
