= William H.G. FitzGerald Tennis Center =

Tennis venue in Washington, D.C., US

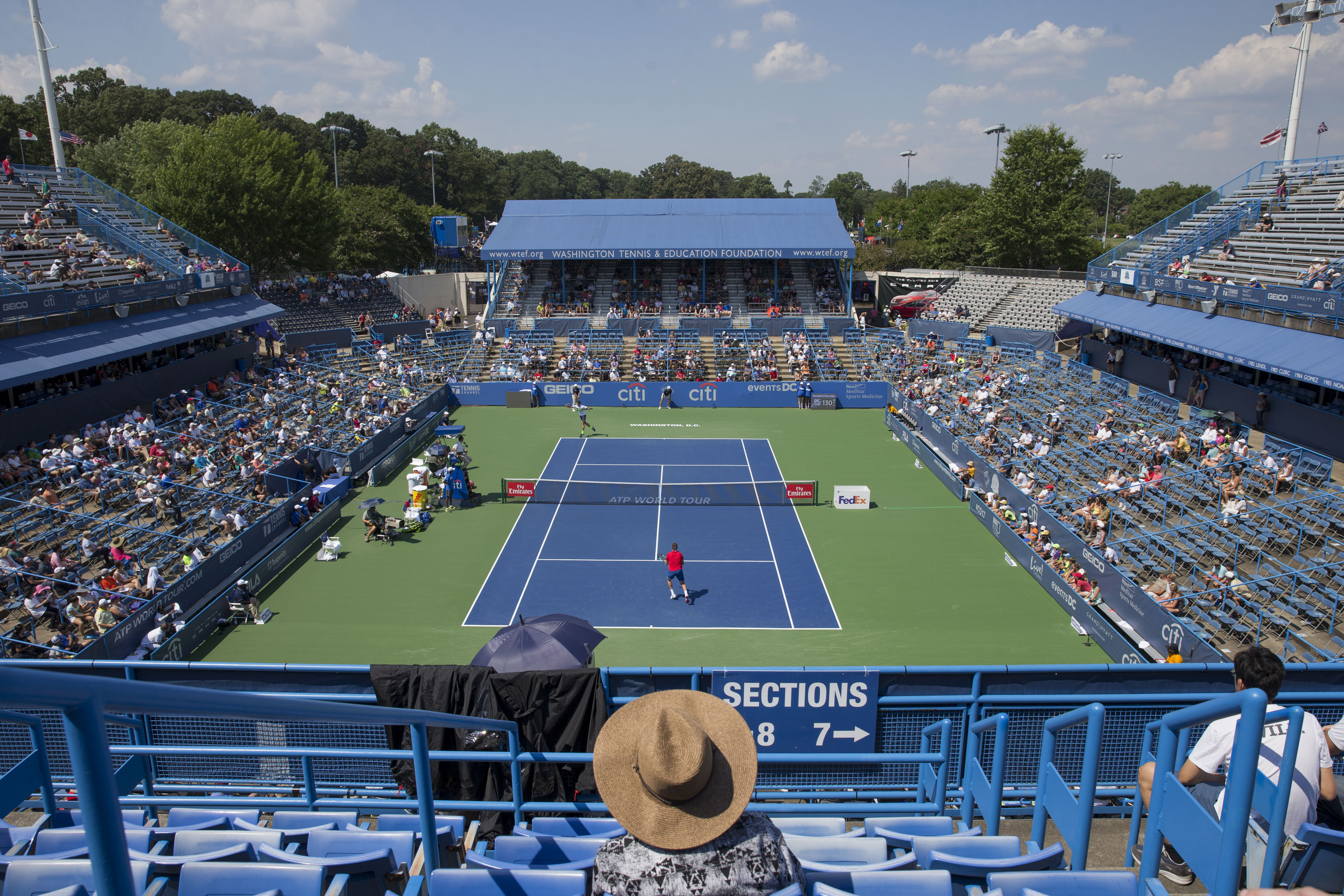
- Interactive map of William H.G. FitzGerald Tennis Center
- Full name: William H.G. FitzGerald Tennis Center
- Location: Rock Creek Park, Washington, D.C. United States
- Coordinates: 38.9544154°N 77.0373525°W
- Owner: Washington, D.C.
- Operator: Washington, D.C.
- Capacity: 7,500 (tennis)
- Surface: Hardcourt

Construction
- Built: 1990

Tenants
- Washington Open (ATP 500 Series) (1990–present); Washington Open (WTA 500 series) (1991, 2012–present)

The William H.G. FitzGerald Tennis Center is a tennis venue located in Rock Creek Park in Washington, D.C., United States It is named after William H. G. FitzGerald, a Washington-based private investor who was active in philanthropies and served as United States Ambassador to Ireland. It houses 15 hard courts and 10 clay courts. There are also five indoors courts which are heated and available in winter. The main stadium seats 7,500 spectators, including 31 suites with air conditioning. The center is the home of the Washington Open, an annual ATP Tour and WTA Tour event.

== Davis Cup and Billie Jean King Cup fixtures ==
The William H.G. FitzGerald Tennis Center has hosted ties in the Davis Cup and Billie Jean King Cup international team competitions. The women's competition was known as the Fed Cup when the venue hosted its only tie in 2003.

Tournament	Year	Surface	Winning nation	Losing nation	Tie score
Davis Cup	1997	Hard (outdoor, Plexipave)	United States	Australia	4–1
Billie Jean King Cup (then Fed Cup)	2003	Hard (outdoor)	United States	Italy	5–0

== Gallery ==
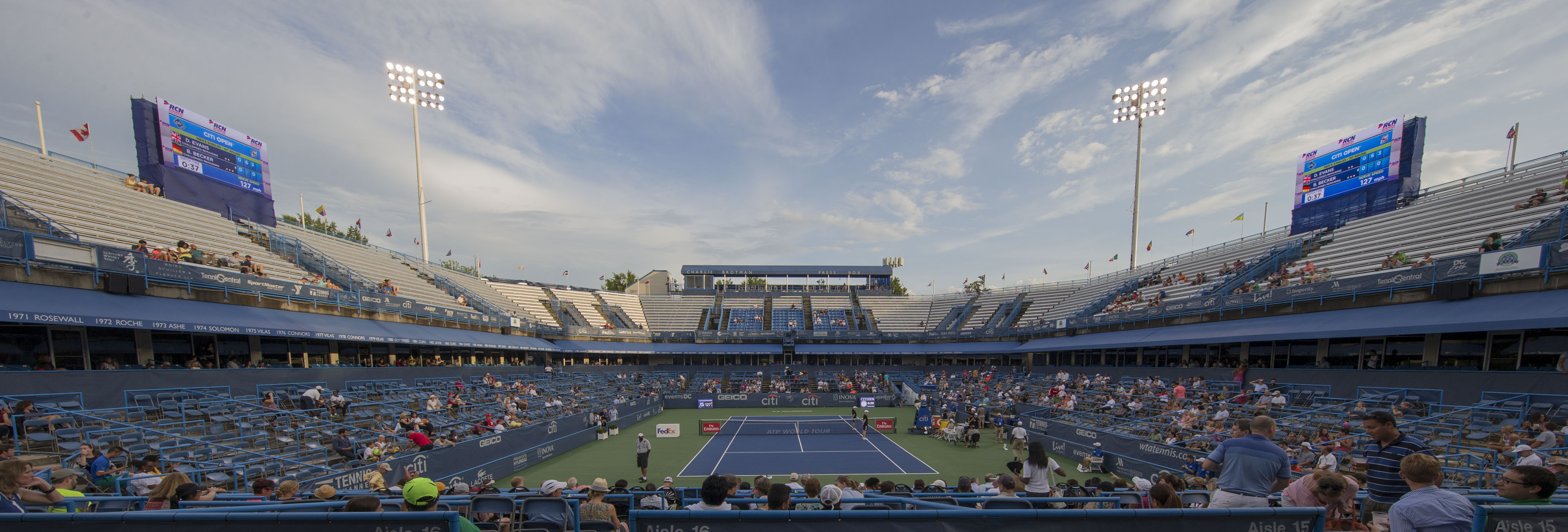

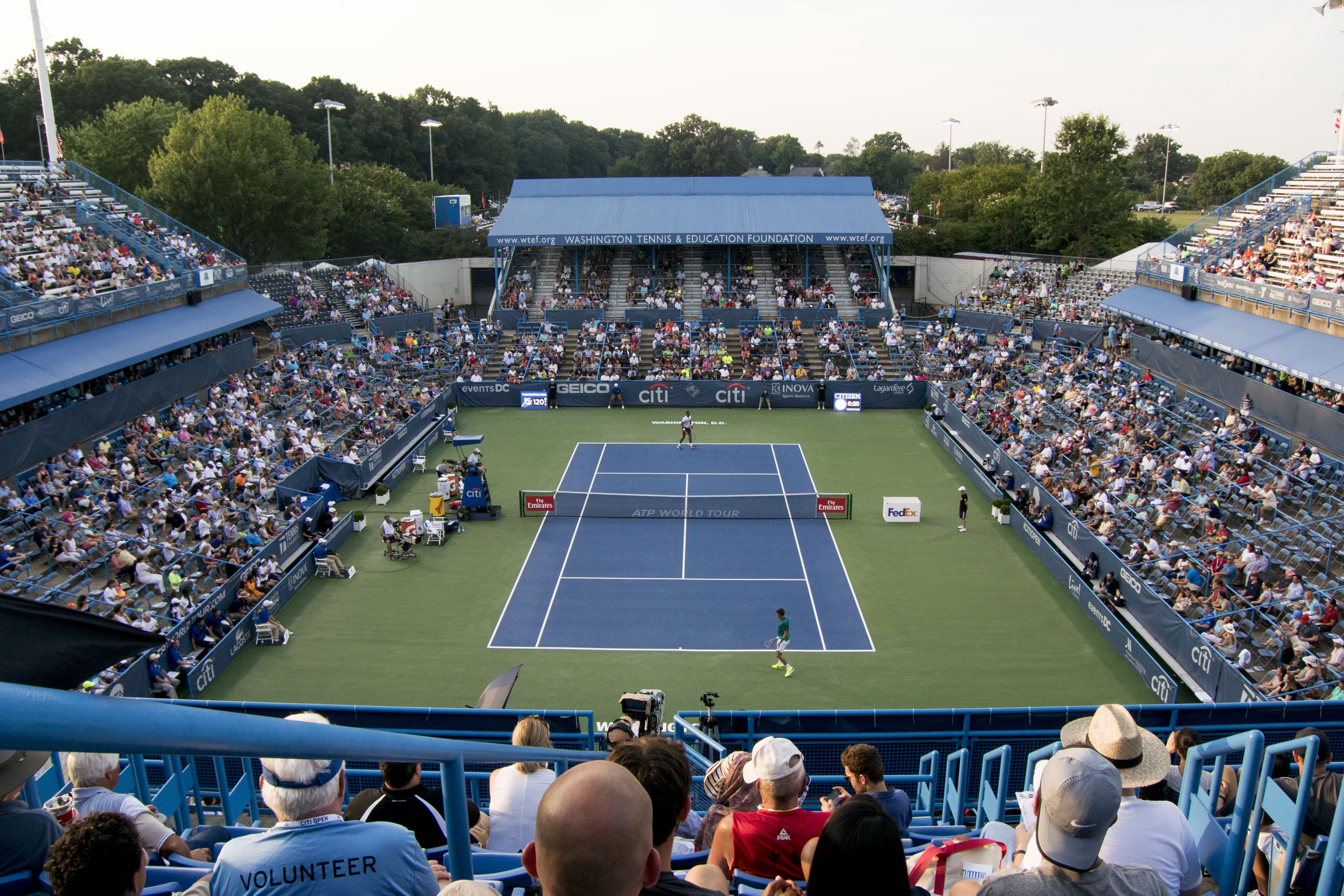

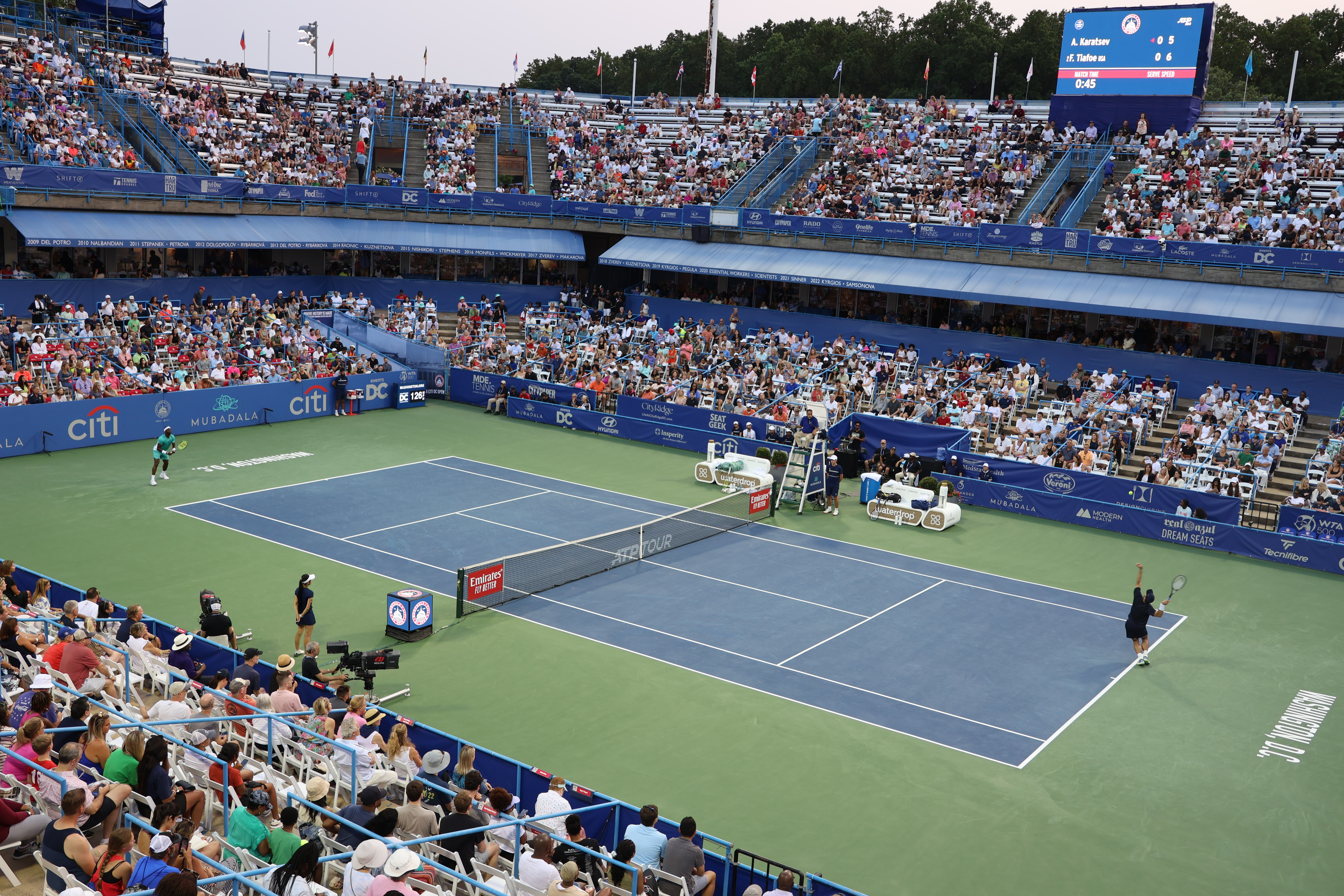

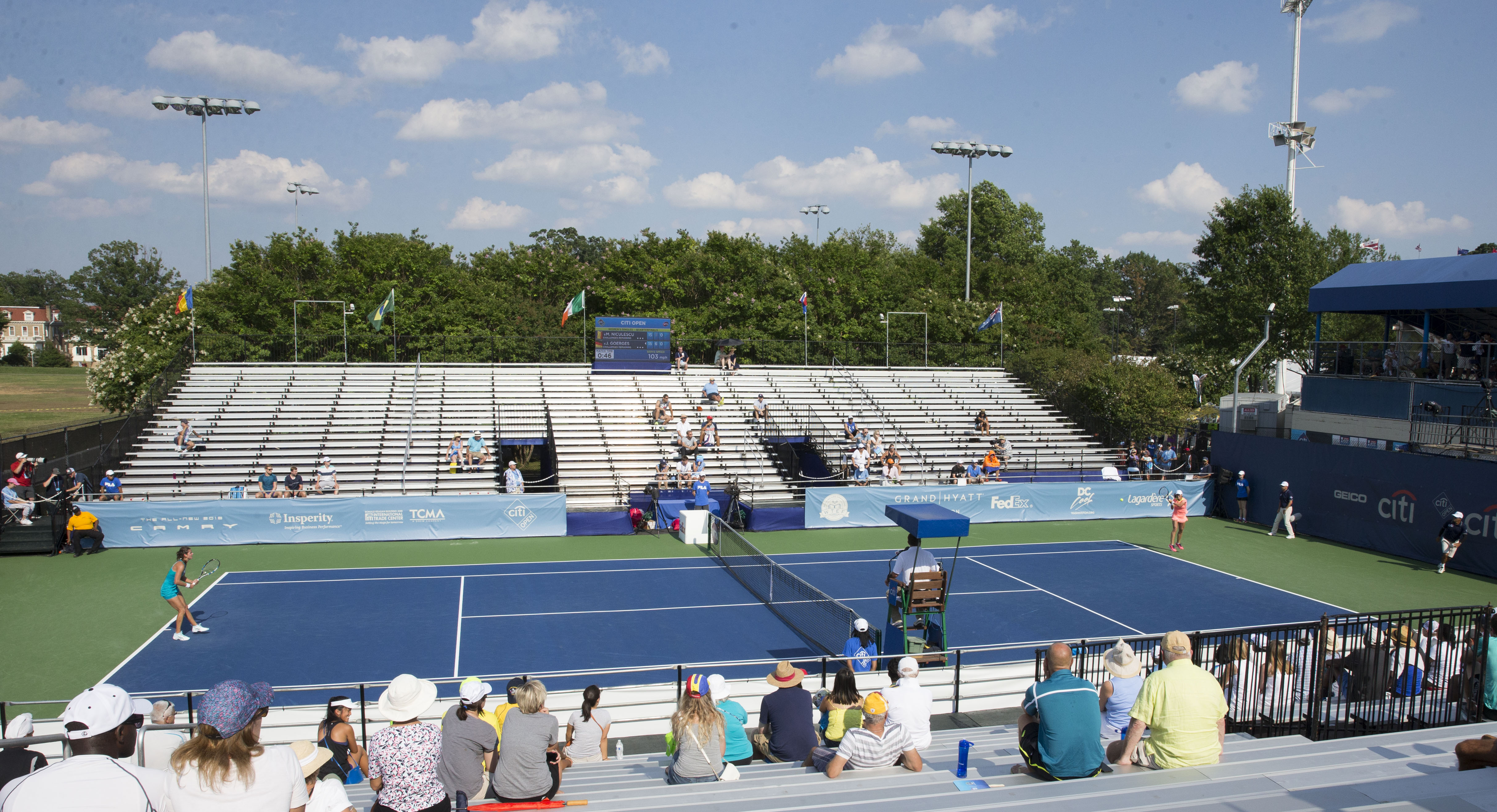

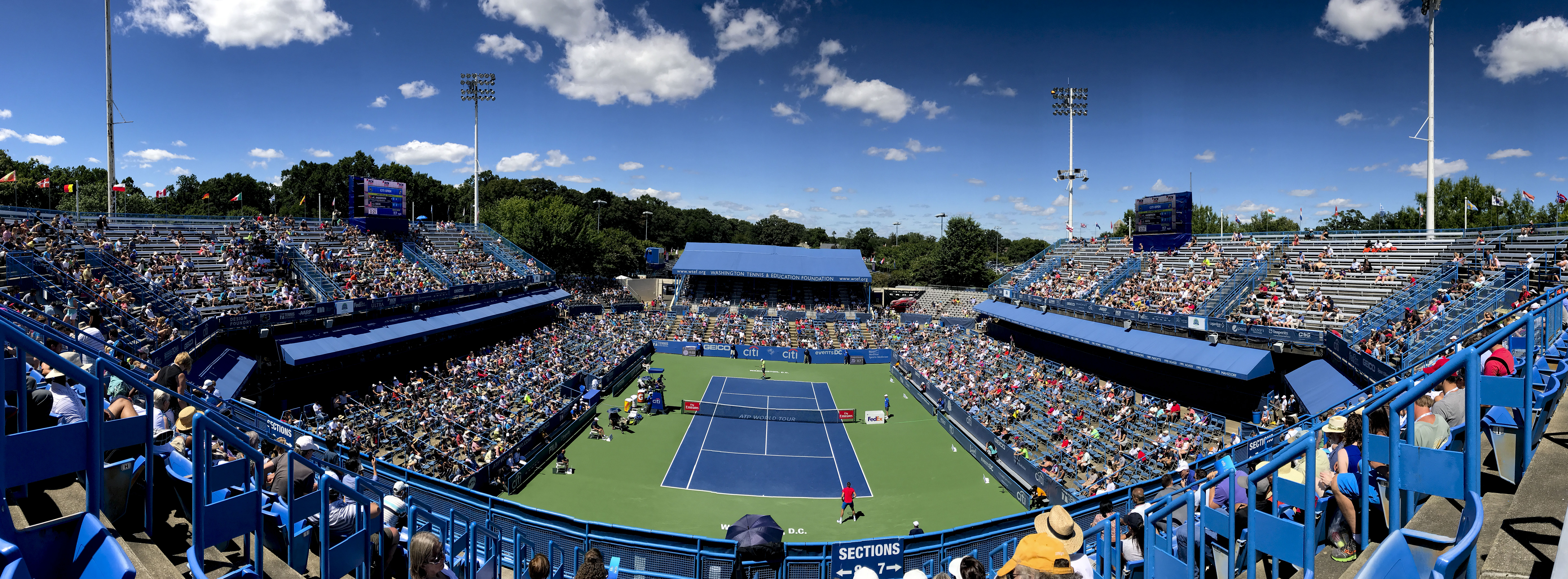

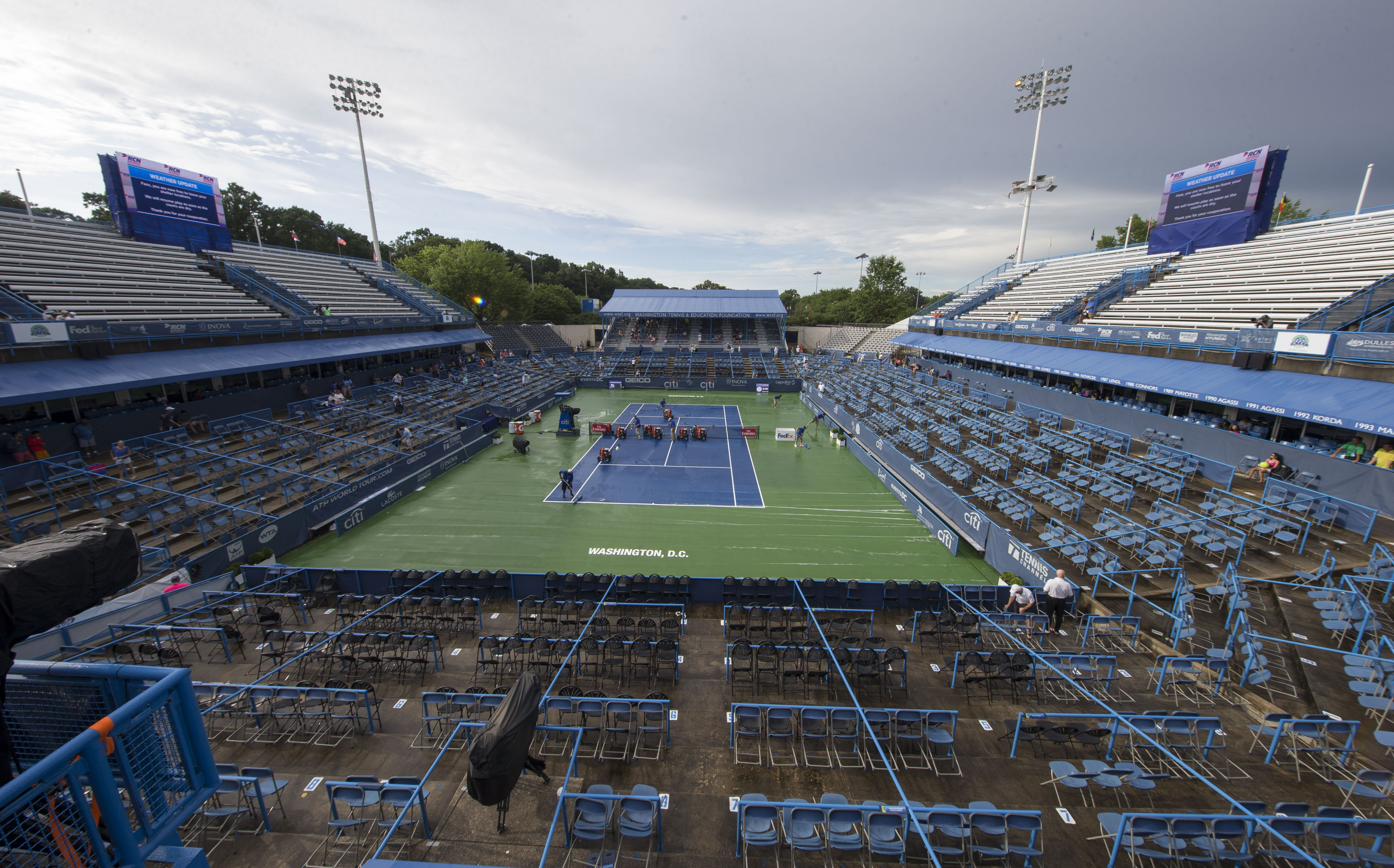

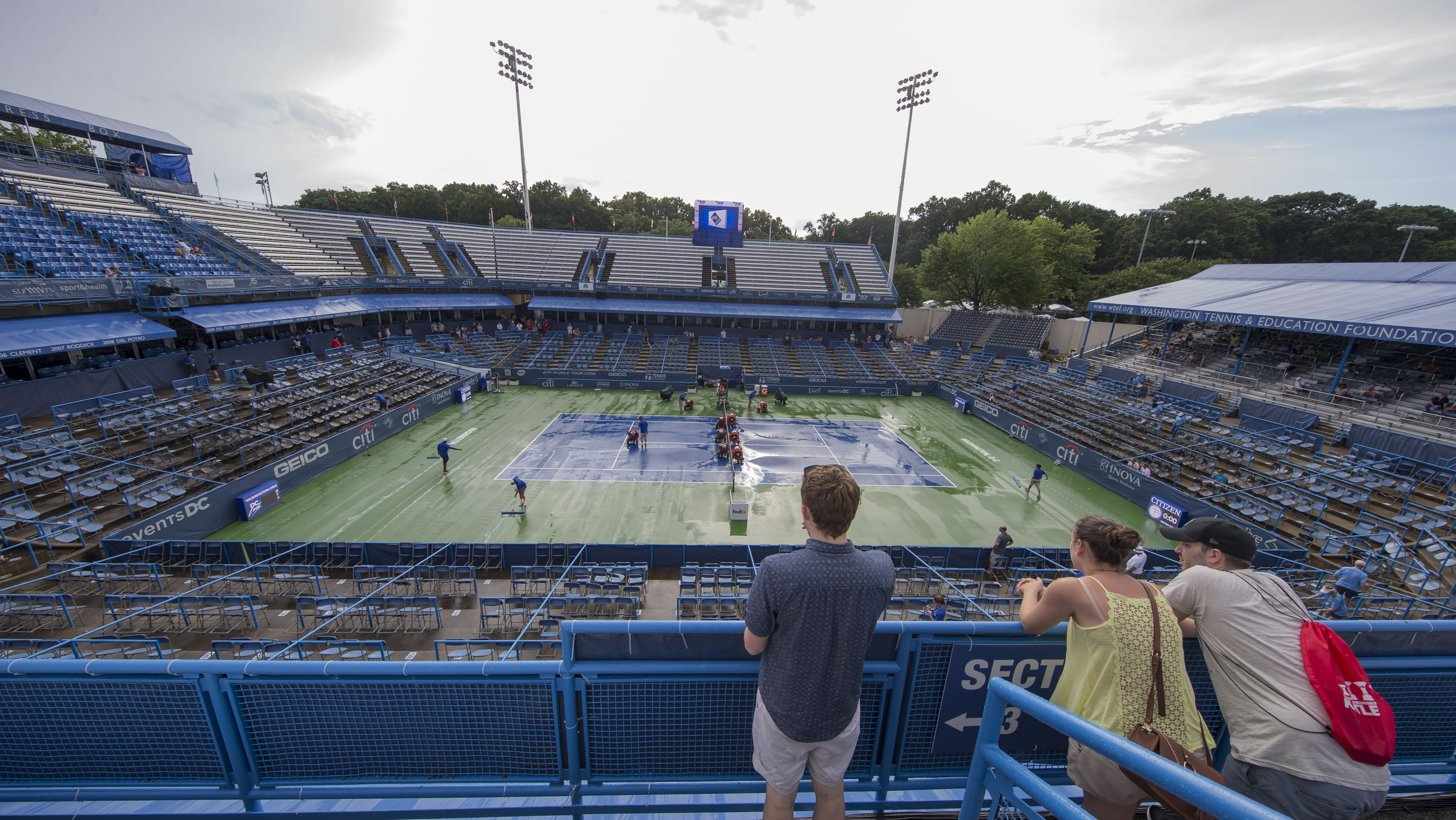

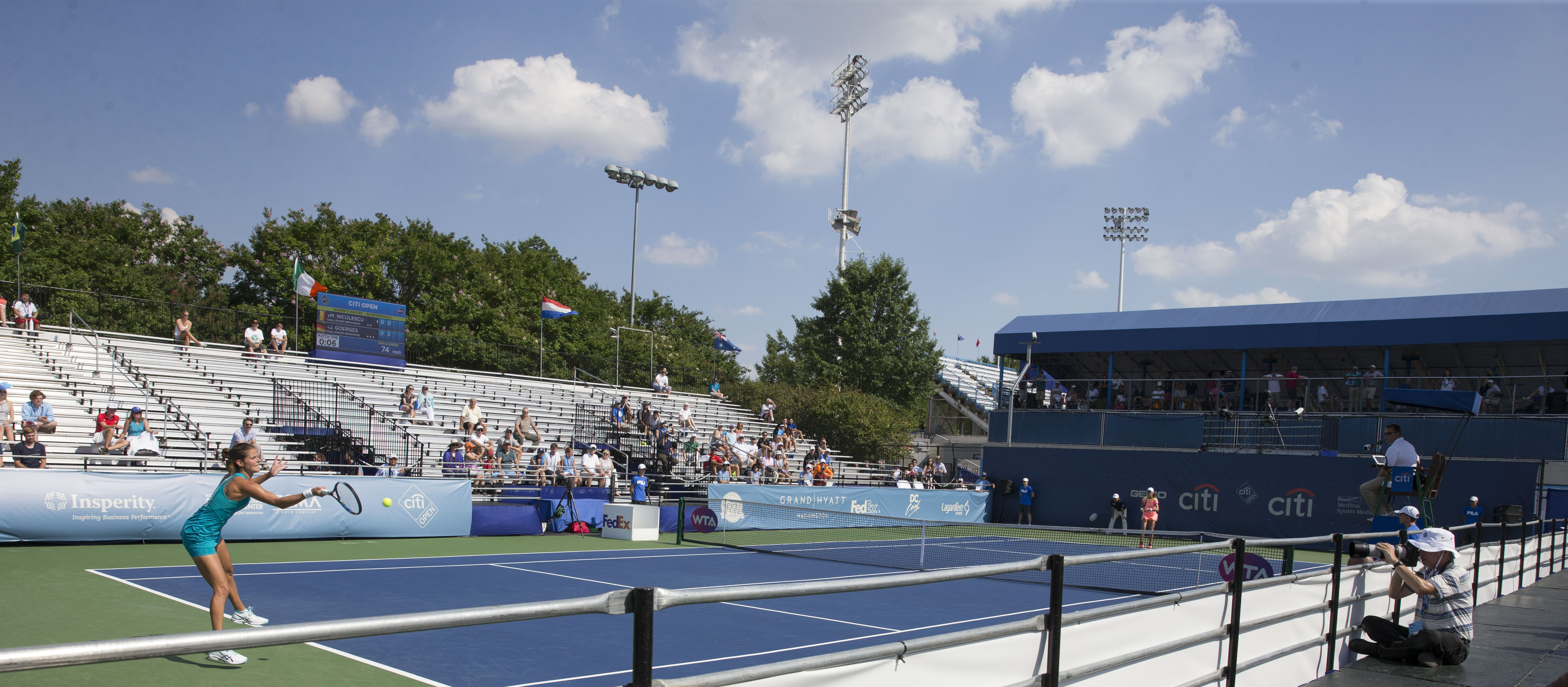

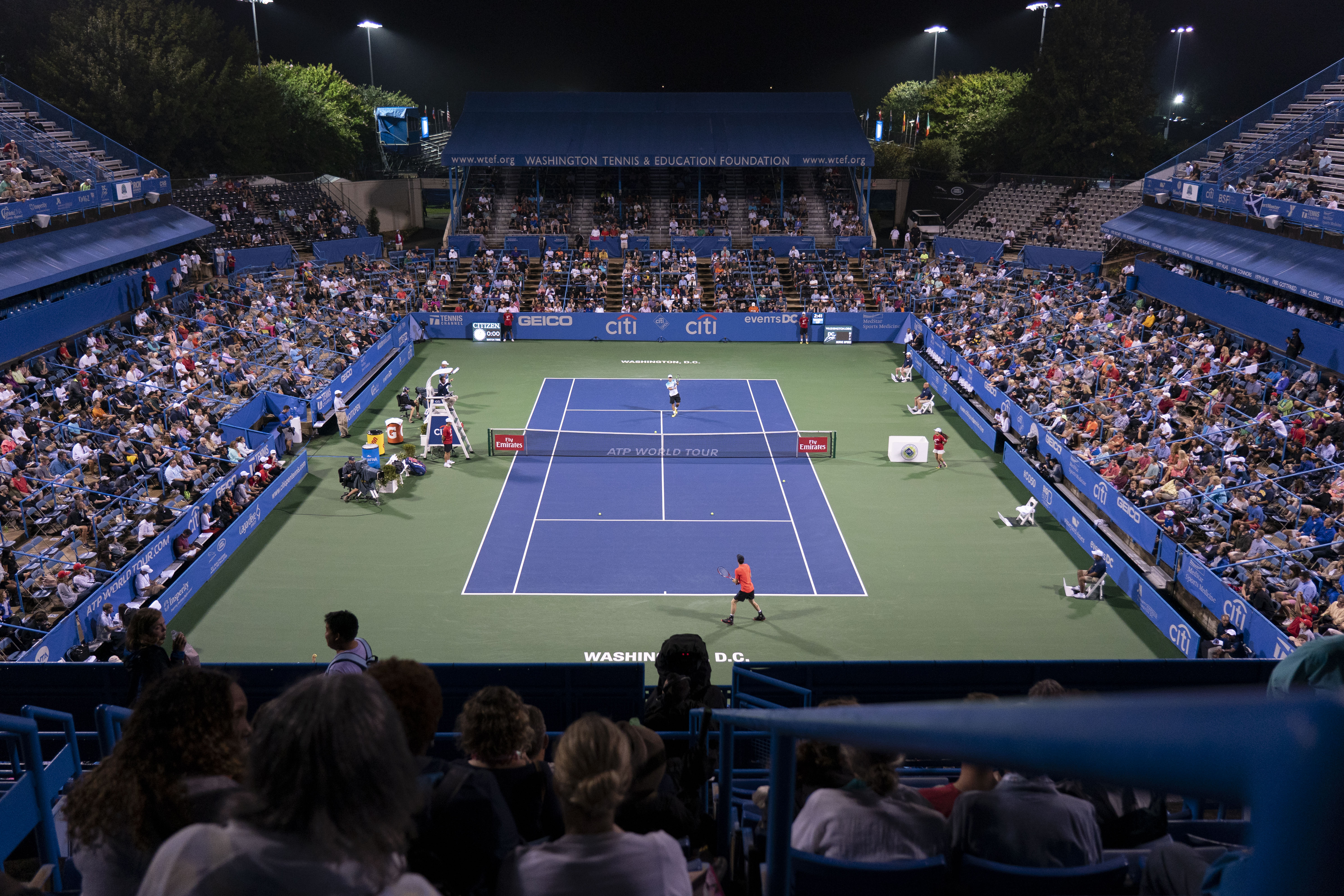
