= Washington DC Open =

Annual tournament

Coordinates: 38.954°N 77.037°W

Tournament information
- Event name: Mubadala DC Open
- Tour: ATP Tour; WTA Tour
- Founded: 1969; 57 years ago
- Location: Washington, D.C.
- Venue: William H.G. FitzGerald Tennis Center
- Surface: Hardcourt
- Website: mubadaladcopen.com

Current champions (2026)
- Men's singles: (United States) Taylor Fritz
- Women's singles: (Philippines) Alexandra Eala
- Men's doubles: (United Kingdom) Julian Cash (United Kingdom) Lloyd Glasspool
- Women's doubles: (New Zealand) Erin Routliffe (Indonesia) Aldila Sutjiadi
ATP Tour
- Category: ATP 500
- Draw: 32S / 24Q / 16D
- Prize money: US$2,396,115
WTA Tour
- Category: WTA 500
- Draw: 28S / 16Q / 16D
- Prize money: US$1,637,982

The Washington DC Open, branded as the Mubadala DC Open for sponsorship reasons, is an annual professional outdoor hardcourt tennis tournament played at the William H.G. FitzGerald Tennis Center in Rock Creek Park in Washington, D.C. The event is categorized as an ATP 500 event on the ATP Tour and a WTA 500 event on the WTA Tour and is the only combined 500 event in the world.

Organized annually in the summer schedule of events on North American hardcourts leading up to the US Open, the Washington Open was first held in 1969 as the Washington Star International. It was held on clay courts until 1986, when the surface was changed to hardcourts. In 2011, the event expanded to include its first women's tournament, a WTA International (now WTA 250) competition held in a separate venue in College Park, Maryland. The following year, the men's and women's events were consolidated at the Washington venue.

In 2023, the WTA 500-level Silicon Valley Classic was discontinued and merged with the Citi DC Open, forming the first joint-500-level event on the ATP and WTA tours. The tournament is owned and managed by Mark Ein in partnership with IMG.

== History ==
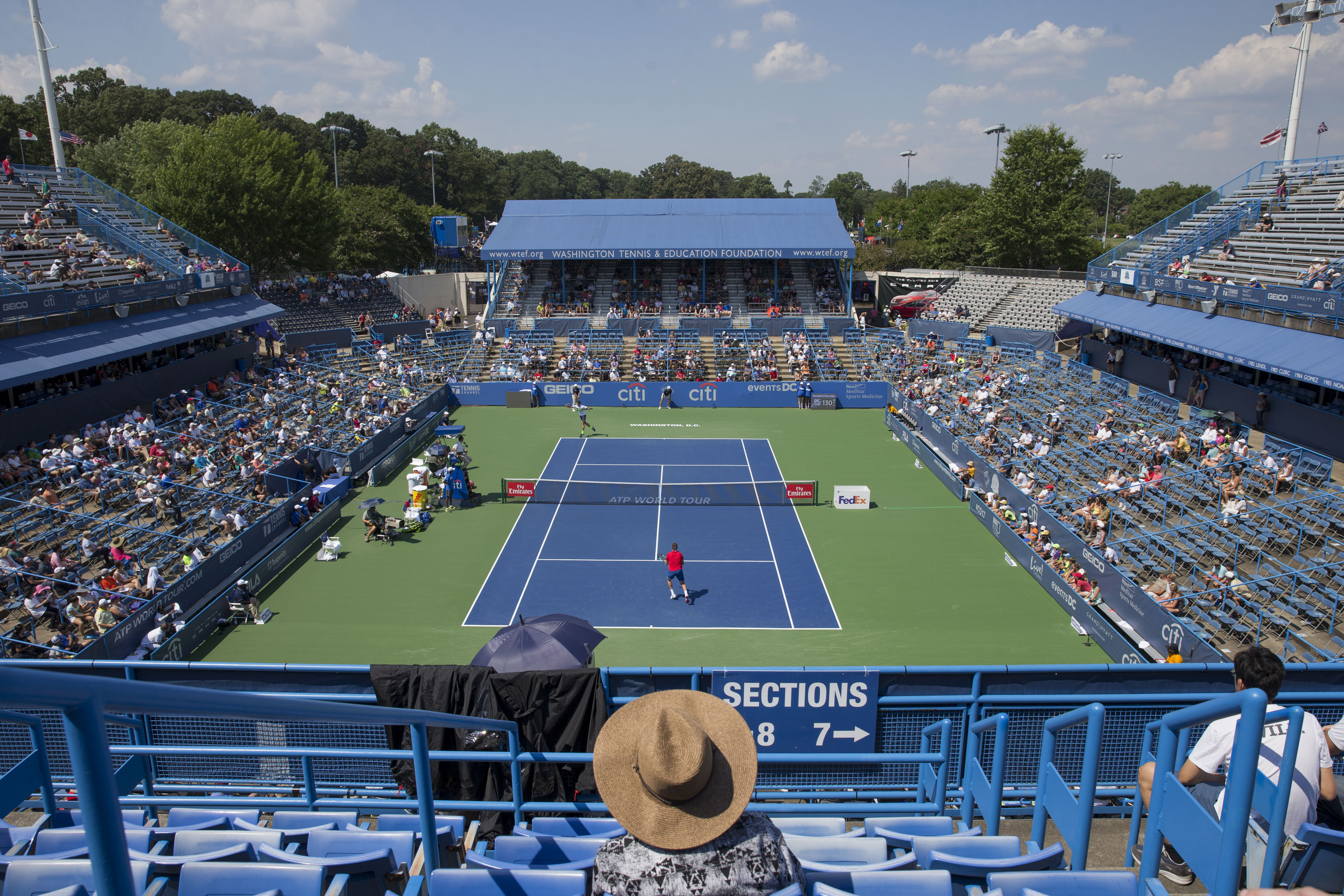
The tournament's center court

The tournament was first held on the men's tour in 1969, known as the Washington Star International from 1969 to 1981, the Sovran Bank Classic from 1982 to 1992, the Newsweek Tennis Classic in 1993, the Legg Mason Tennis Classic from 1994 to 2011, and the Citi Open from 2012 to 2022. Competition was held on outdoor clay courts until 1986 when it switched to the current hard courts. Co-founders John A. Harris and Donald Dell, founder of ProServ International, have since remained closely involved. The location of the event in Washington, D.C., was chosen at the urging of Arthur Ashe, an early supporter.

The women's event was first held in 2011 in College Park, Maryland, as the Citi Open, and for the 2012 season, the ATP and WTA decided to merge their Maryland and Washington spots into a joint tournament, with the women's event moving to the William H.G. FitzGerald Tennis Center, and Citigroup replacing Legg Mason as title sponsor of the joint event.

In 2015, the Washington Open dropped out of the US Open Series because of disagreements with ESPN, which that year took over broadcast rights to the US Open and US Open Series events. ESPN would only commit to airing four hours of coverage from the tournament on ESPN2, with the rest relegated to streaming on ESPN3; by contrast, coverage had been split between ESPN2 and Tennis Channel in 2014. Donald Dell criticized ESPN for using ESPN3 to acquire sports rights without any intent to broadcast them on linear television, arguing that "if you're running a tournament, and it's $2 million, and sponsorship money in the $6 million-to-$8 million range, you've got sponsors that don't want to be having only four or six hours on television." A four-year, $2.1 million agreement was reached with Tennis Channel, promising 171 hours of television coverage. The broadcast revenue was also used to fund additional amenities at the tournament venue.

In 2019, the Washington Open was acquired by venture capitalist and USTA board member Mark Ein. It returned to the US Open Series, and also signed a five-year extension of its media rights with Tennis Channel. The 2020 tournament was cancelled due to the COVID-19 pandemic. The men's event returned for 2021, but the women's event remained cancelled; the WTA did not reinstate its sanctioning of the tournament due to conflicts with the 2020 Summer Olympics. The tournament instead organized a women's invitational, featuring Coco Gauff, Jessica Pegula, and Jennifer Brady.

In June 2023, Ein and IMG announced that the Washington Open would merge with the Silicon Valley Classic to form a single tournament in Washington, D.C.; this therefore promoted the Washington Open from a WTA 250 event to a WTA 500 event. Players had usually been divided between the two tournaments, as the Silicon Valley Classic was more prestigious, but the Washington Open was in closer proximity to the other tournaments of the North American hardcourt season. As a result of the merger, the Silicon Valley Classic's title sponsor Mubadala Investment Company became a co-title sponsor of the event, rebranding it as the Mubadala Citi DC Open. The tournament was the first-ever joint 500-level event on the ATP and WTA tours, and remains the only joint 500 event in the world. Citigroup did not renew its sponsorship, and Mubadala became the sole title sponsor of the tournament beginning in 2026 under a five-year deal.

== Past finals ==
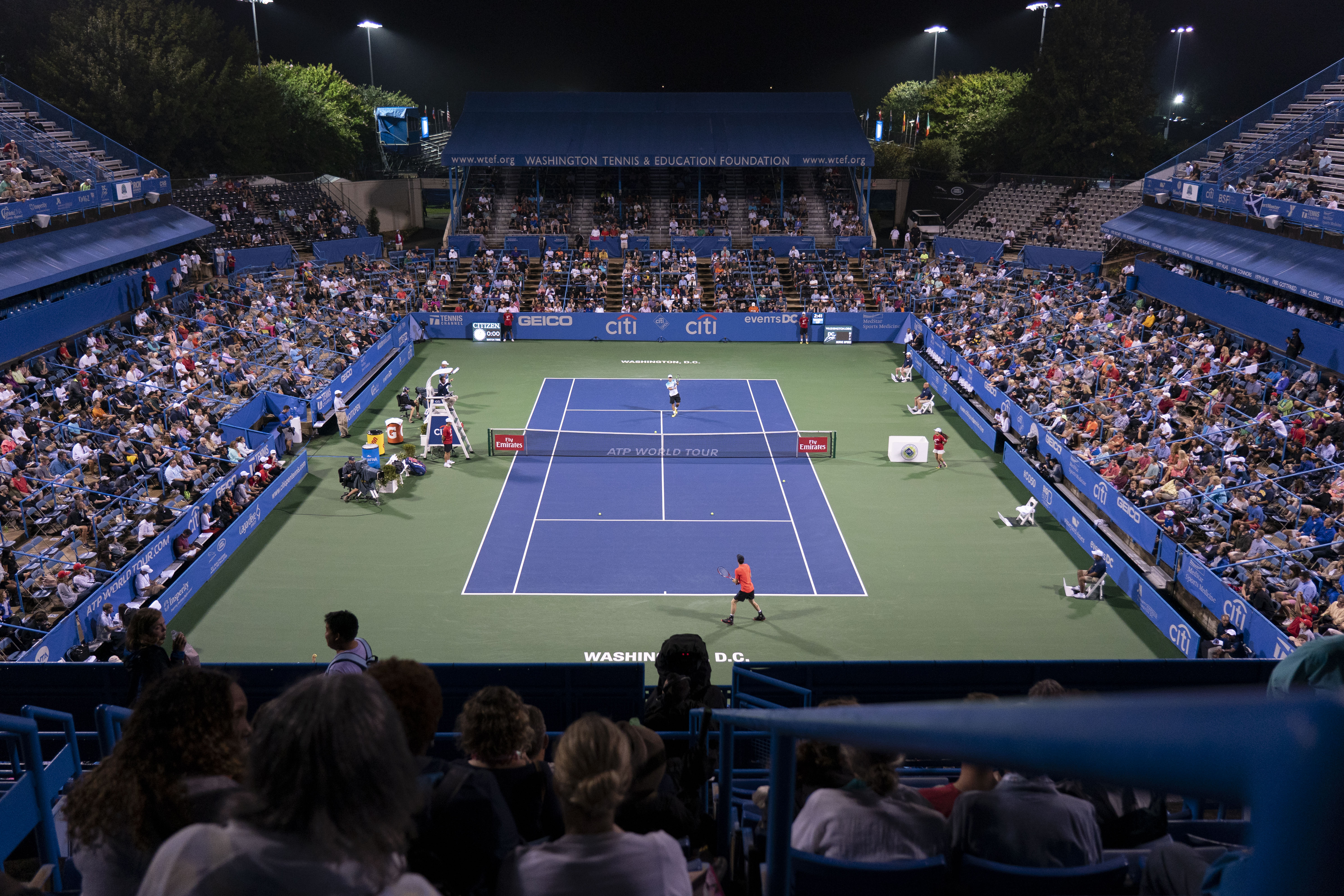
A night match in 2018.

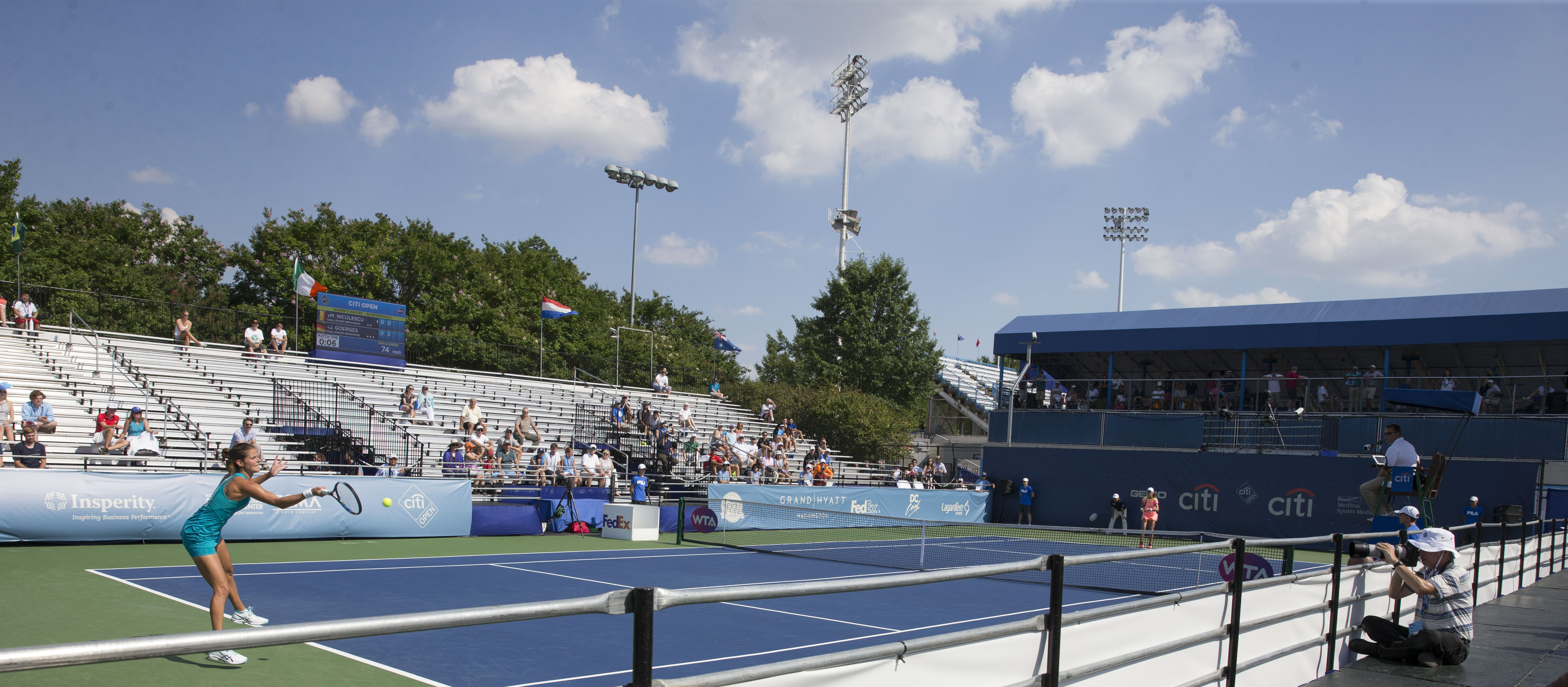
Grandstand in 2017.

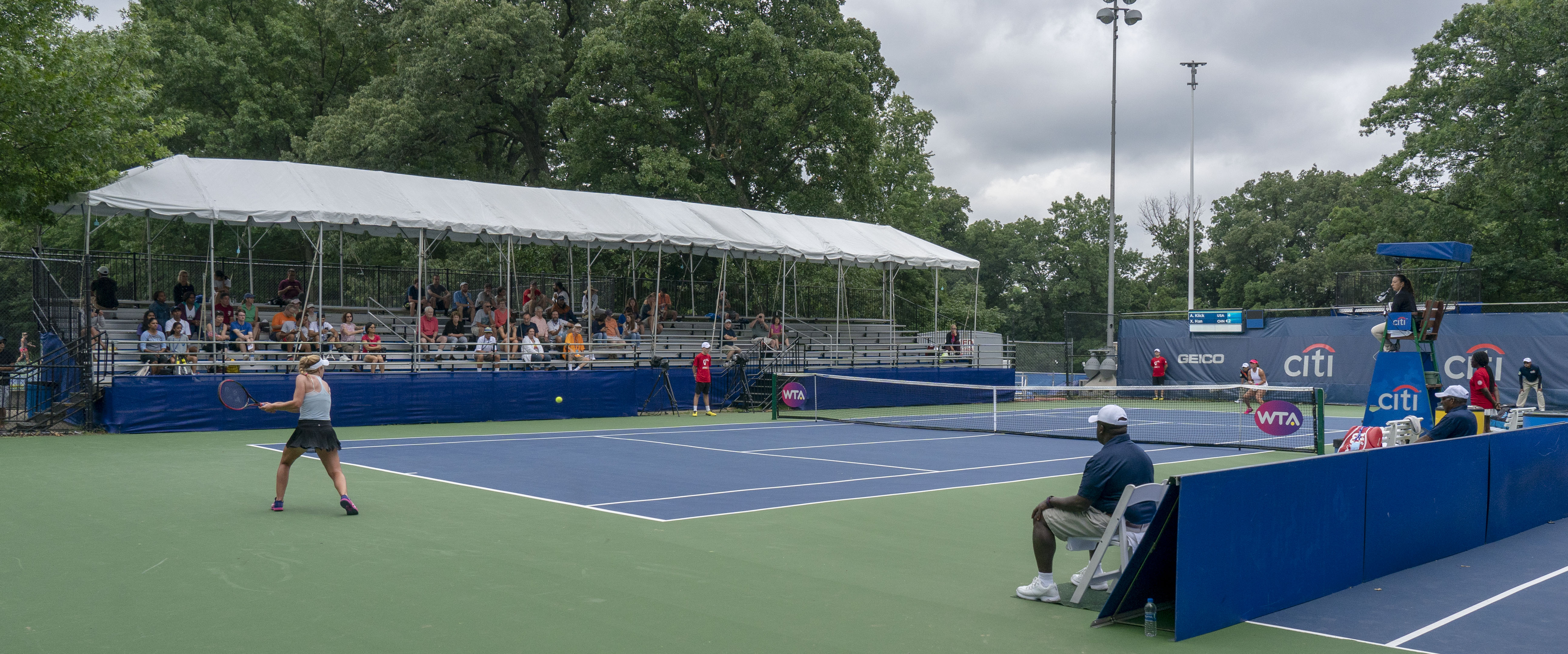
A side court in 2017.

In the men's singles, Andre Agassi (1990–91, 1995, 1998–99) holds the records for most titles (five) and most finals overall (six, runner-up in 2000). He also shares with Michael Chang (1996–97), Juan Martín del Potro (2008–09) and Alexander Zverev (2017–18) the record for most consecutive titles, with two. In the women's singles, Magdaléna Rybáriková (2012–13) holds the record for most titles (two) and co-holds the record for most finals (two) with Anastasia Pavlyuchenkova (runner-up in 2012, 2015). In the men's doubles, Marty Riessen (1971–72, 1974, 1979) and the Bryan brothers (2005–07, 2015) hold the record for most titles (four), with the Bryans also holding the record for most consecutive titles (three). The Bryans co-hold the record for most finals (six, runners-up in 2001–02) with Raúl Ramírez (winner in 1976, 1981–82, runner-up in 1975, 1978–79). In the women's doubles, Shuko Aoyama (2012–14) holds alone the record for most titles, most consecutive titles and most finals (three).

=== Men's singles ===
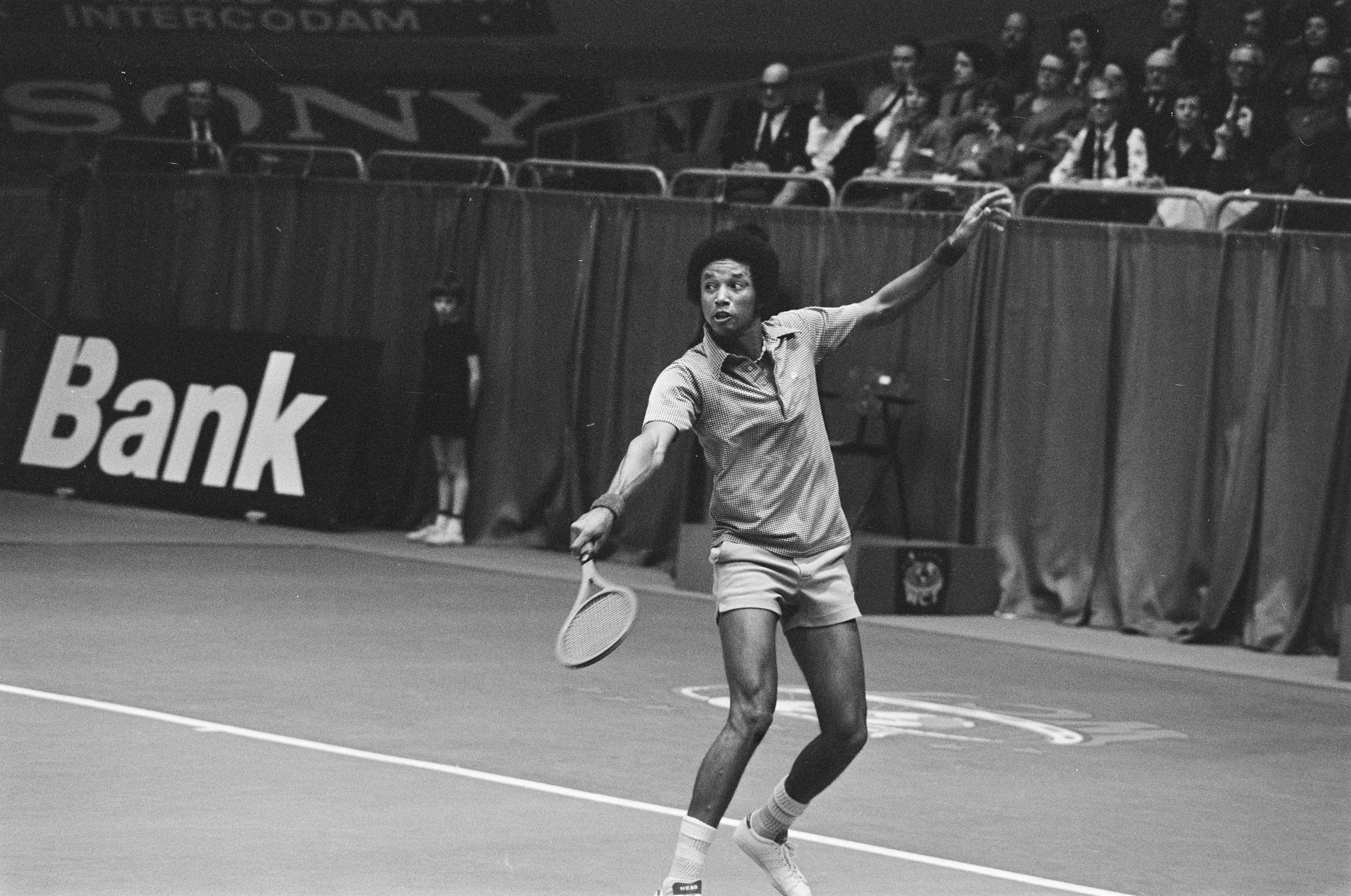
American legend Arthur Ashe won the 1973 title.

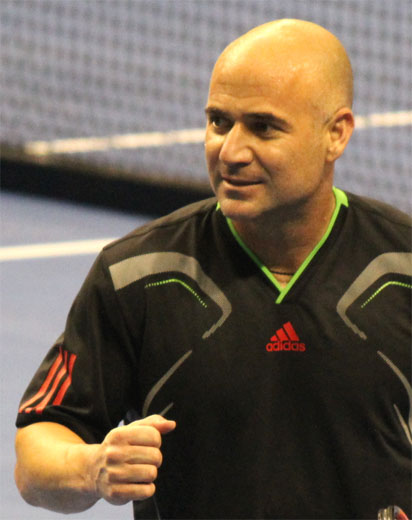
Andre Agassi has won the most titles of any man, with five titles.

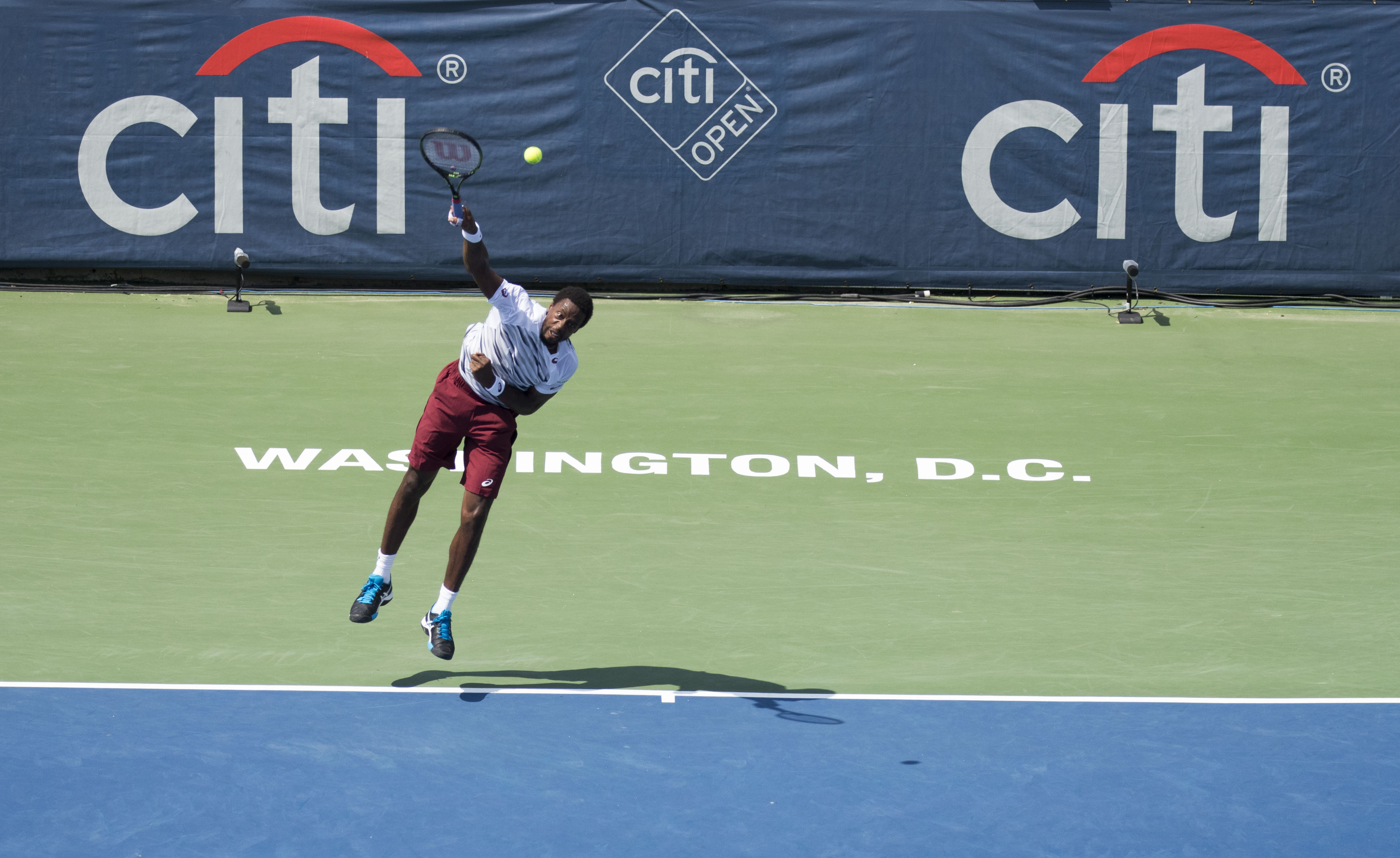
Gael Monfils, shown here serving in 2016, won the 2016 Washington Open title.

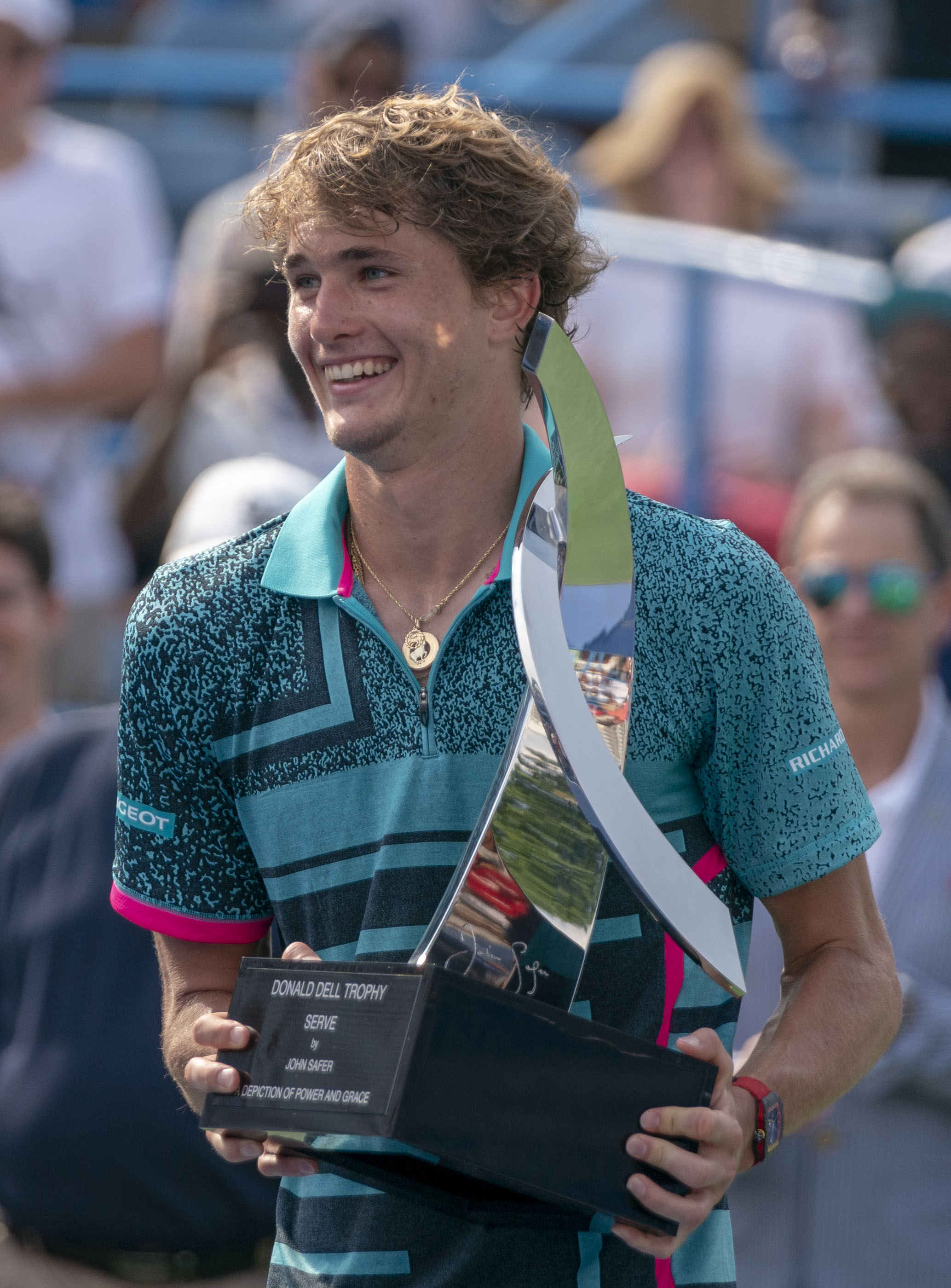
Alexander Zverev holding the trophy after winning the 2018 title.

Year	Champions	Runners-up	Score
1969	(Brazil) Thomaz Koch	(United States) Arthur Ashe	7–5, 9–7, 4–6, 2–6, 6–4
↓ Grand Prix circuit ↓
1970	(United States) Cliff Richey	(United States) Arthur Ashe	7–5, 6–1, 6–2
↓ WCT circuit ↓
1971	(Australia) Ken Rosewall	(United States) Marty Riessen	6–2, 7–5, 6–1
1972	(Australia) Tony Roche	(United States) Marty Riessen	3–6, 7–6, 6–4
↓ Grand Prix circuit ↓
1973	(United States) Arthur Ashe	(Netherlands) Tom Okker	6–4, 6–2
1974	(United States) Harold Solomon	(Argentina) Guillermo Vilas	1–6, 6–3, 6–4
1975	(Argentina) Guillermo Vilas	(United States) Harold Solomon	6–1, 6–3
1976	(United States) Jimmy Connors	(Mexico) Raúl Ramírez	6–2, 6–4
1977	(Argentina) Guillermo Vilas (2)	(United States) Brian Gottfried	6–4, 7–5
1978	(United States) Jimmy Connors (2)	(United States) Eddie Dibbs	7–5, 7–5
1979	(Argentina) Guillermo Vilas (3)	(Paraguay) Víctor Pecci Sr.	7–6^{(7–4)}, 7–6^{(7–3)}
1980	(United States) Brian Gottfried	(Argentina) José Luis Clerc	7–5, 4–6, 6–4
1981	(Argentina) José Luis Clerc	(Argentina) Guillermo Vilas	7–5, 6–2
1982	(Czechoslovakia) Ivan Lendl	(United States) Jimmy Arias	6–3, 6–3
1983	(Argentina) José Luis Clerc (2)	(United States) Jimmy Arias	6–3, 3–6, 6–0
1984	(Ecuador) Andrés Gómez	(United States) Aaron Krickstein	6–2, 6–2
1985	(France) Yannick Noah	(Argentina) Martín Jaite	6–4, 6–3
1986	(Czechoslovakia) Karel Nováček	(France) Thierry Tulasne	6–1, 7–6^{(7–4)}
1987	(Czechoslovakia) Ivan Lendl (2)	(United States) Brad Gilbert	6–1, 6–0
1988	(United States) Jimmy Connors (3)	(Ecuador) Andrés Gómez	6–1, 6–4
1989	(United States) Tim Mayotte	(United States) Brad Gilbert	3–6, 6–4, 7–5
↓ ATP Tour 500 (Note: Known as Championship Series from 1990 till 1999. International Series Gold from 2000 till 2008.) ↓
1990	(United States) Andre Agassi	(United States) Jim Grabb	6–1, 6–4
1991	(United States) Andre Agassi (2)	(Czechoslovakia) Petr Korda	6–3, 6–4
1992	(Czechoslovakia) Petr Korda	(Sweden) Henrik Holm	6–4, 6–4
1993	(Israel) Amos Mansdorf	(United States) Todd Martin	7–6^{(7–3)}, 7–5
1994	(Sweden) Stefan Edberg	(Australia) Jason Stoltenberg	6–4, 6–2
1995	(United States) Andre Agassi (3)	(Sweden) Stefan Edberg	6–4, 2–6, 7–5
1996	(United States) Michael Chang	(South Africa) Wayne Ferreira	6–2, 6–4
1997	(United States) Michael Chang (2)	(Czech Republic) Petr Korda	5–7, 6–2, 6–1
1998	(United States) Andre Agassi (4)	(Australia) Scott Draper	6–2, 6–0
1999	(United States) Andre Agassi (5)	(Russia) Yevgeny Kafelnikov	7–6^{(7–3)}, 6–1
2000	(Spain) Àlex Corretja	(United States) Andre Agassi	6–2, 6–3
2001	(United States) Andy Roddick	(Netherlands) Sjeng Schalken	6–2, 6–3
2002	(United States) James Blake	(Thailand) Paradorn Srichaphan	1–6, 7–6^{(7–5)}, 6–4
↓ ATP Tour 250 (Note: Known as International Series from 2000 till 2008.) ↓
2003	(United Kingdom) Tim Henman	(Chile) Fernando González	6–3, 6–4
2004	(Australia) Lleyton Hewitt	(Luxembourg) Gilles Müller	6–3, 6–4
2005	(United States) Andy Roddick (2)	(United States) James Blake	7–5, 6–3
2006	(France) Arnaud Clément	(United Kingdom) Andy Murray	7–6^{(7–3)}, 6–2
2007	(United States) Andy Roddick (3)	(United States) John Isner	6–4, 7–6^{(7–4)}
2008	(Argentina) Juan Martín del Potro	(Serbia) Viktor Troicki	6–3, 6–3
↓ ATP Tour 500 ↓
2009	(Argentina) Juan Martín del Potro (2)	(United States) Andy Roddick	3–6, 7–5, 7–6^{(8–6)}
2010	(Argentina) David Nalbandian	(Cyprus) Marcos Baghdatis	6–2, 7–6^{(7–4)}
2011	(Czech Republic) Radek Štěpánek	(France) Gaël Monfils	6–4, 6–4
2012	(Ukraine) Alexandr Dolgopolov	(Germany) Tommy Haas	6–7^{(7–9)}, 6–4, 6–1
2013	(Argentina) Juan Martín del Potro (3)	(United States) John Isner	3–6, 6–1, 6–2
2014	(Canada) Milos Raonic	(Canada) Vasek Pospisil	6–1, 6–4
2015	(Japan) Kei Nishikori	(United States) John Isner	4–6, 6–4, 6–4
2016	(France) Gaël Monfils	(Croatia) Ivo Karlović	5–7, 7–6^{(8–6)}, 6–4
2017	(Germany) Alexander Zverev	(South Africa) Kevin Anderson	6–4, 6–4
2018	(Germany) Alexander Zverev (2)	(Australia) Alex de Minaur	6–2, 6–4
2019	(Australia) Nick Kyrgios	(Russia) Daniil Medvedev	7–6^{(8–6)}, 7–6^{(7–4)}
2020	Canceled due to the COVID-19 pandemic		
2021	(Italy) Jannik Sinner	(United States) Mackenzie McDonald	7–5, 4–6, 7–5
2022	(Australia) Nick Kyrgios (2)	(Japan) Yoshihito Nishioka	6–4, 6–3
2023	(United Kingdom) Dan Evans	(Netherlands) Tallon Griekspoor	7–5, 6–3
2024	(United States) Sebastian Korda	(Italy) Flavio Cobolli	4–6, 6–2, 6–0
2025	(Australia) Alex de Minaur	(Spain) Alejandro Davidovich Fokina	5–7, 6–1, 7–6^{(7–3)}
2026	(United States) Taylor Fritz	(Spain) Rafael Jódar	7–6^{(7–2)}, 6-4

=== Women's singles ===
Year	Champions	Runners-up	Score
2011	(Russia) Nadia Petrova	(Israel) Shahar Pe'er	7–5, 6–2
2012	(Slovakia) Magdaléna Rybáriková	(Russia) Anastasia Pavlyuchenkova	6–1, 6–1
2013	(Slovakia) Magdaléna Rybáriková (2)	(Germany) Andrea Petkovic	6–4, 7–6^{(7–2)}
2014	(Russia) Svetlana Kuznetsova	(Japan) Kurumi Nara	6–3, 4–6, 6–4
2015	(United States) Sloane Stephens	(Russia) Anastasia Pavlyuchenkova	6–1, 6–2
2016	(Belgium) Yanina Wickmayer	(United States) Lauren Davis	6–4, 6–2
2017	(Russia) Ekaterina Makarova	(Germany) Julia Görges	3–6, 7–6^{(7–2)}, 6–0
2018	(Russia) Svetlana Kuznetsova (2)	(Croatia) Donna Vekić	4–6, 7–6^{(9–7)}, 6–2
2019	(United States) Jessica Pegula	(Italy) Camila Giorgi	6–2, 6–2
2020	Canceled due to the COVID-19 pandemic		
↓ Exhibition (WTA revoked sanction) ↓
2021	(United States) Jessica Pegula	(United States) Coco Gauff	4–6, 7–5, [10-8] (Note: Because of the exhibition nature of the event, each match was a two-set match. A ten-point tiebreaker was used in lieu of the third set.)
↓ WTA 250 ↓
2022	(Note: As of March 1, 2022, the WTA announced that players from Russia and Belarus will not compete under the name or flag of Russia or Belarus due to the Russian invasion of Ukraine.) Liudmila Samsonova	(Estonia) Kaia Kanepi	4–6, 6–3, 6–3
↓ WTA 500 ↓
2023	(United States) Coco Gauff	(Greece) Maria Sakkari	6–2, 6–3
2024	(Spain) Paula Badosa	(Czech Republic) Marie Bouzková	6–1, 4–6, 6–4
2025	(Canada) Leylah Fernandez	Anna Kalinskaya	6–1, 6–2
2026	(Philippines) Alexandra Eala	(United States) Jessica Pegula	4–6, 6–4, 6–0

=== Men's doubles ===
Year	Champions	Runners-up	Score
1969	(Chile) Patricio Cornejo (Chile) Jaime Fillol	(United States) Robert Lutz (United States) Stan Smith	4–6, 6–1, 6–4
↓ Grand Prix circuit ↓
1970	(South Africa) Bob Hewitt (South Africa) Frew McMillan	(Romania) Ilie Năstase (Romania) Ion Țiriac	7–5, 6–0
↓ WCT circuit ↓
1971	(Netherlands) Tom Okker (United States) Marty Riessen	(Australia) Bob Carmichael (Australia) Ray Ruffels	7–6, 6–2
1972	(Netherlands) Tom Okker (2) (United States) Marty Riessen (2)	(Australia) John Newcombe (Australia) Tony Roche	3–6, 6–3, 6–2
↓ Grand Prix circuit ↓
1973	(Australia) Ross Case (Australia) Geoff Masters	(Australia) Dick Crealy (Zimbabwe) Andrew Pattison	2–6, 6–1, 6–4
1974	(United States) Tom Gorman (United States) Marty Riessen (3)	(Chile) Patricio Cornejo (Chile) Jaime Fillol	7–5, 6–1
1975	(United States) Robert Lutz (United States) Stan Smith	(United States) Brian Gottfried (Mexico) Raúl Ramírez	7–5, 2–6, 6–1
1976	(United States) Brian Gottfried (Mexico) Raúl Ramírez	(United States) Arthur Ashe (United States) Jimmy Connors	6–3, 6–3
1977	(Australia) John Alexander (Australia) Phil Dent	(United States) Fred McNair (United States) Sherwood Stewart	7–5, 7–5
1978	(United States) Arthur Ashe (South Africa) Bob Hewitt (2)	(United States) Fred McNair (Mexico) Raúl Ramírez	6–3, 6–4
1979	(United States) Marty Riessen (4) (United States) Sherwood Stewart	(United States) Brian Gottfried (Mexico) Raúl Ramírez	2–6, 6–3, 6–4
1980	(Chile) Hans Gildemeister (Ecuador) Andrés Gómez	(United States) Gene Mayer (United States) Sandy Mayer	6–4, 7–5
1981	(Mexico) Raúl Ramírez (2) (United States) Van Winitsky	(Czech Republic) Pavel Složil (United States) Ferdi Taygan	5–7, 7–6^{(9–7)}, 7–6^{(8–6)}
1982	(Mexico) Raúl Ramírez (3) (United States) Van Winitsky (2)	(Chile) Hans Gildemeister (Ecuador) Andrés Gómez	7–5, 7–6
1983	(United States) Mark Dickson (Brazil) Cássio Motta	(Australia) Paul McNamee (United States) Ferdi Taygan	6–2, 1–6, 6–4
1984	(Czech Republic) Pavel Složil (United States) Ferdi Taygan	(United States) Drew Gitlin (United States) Blaine Willenborg	7–6, 6–1
1985	(Chile) Hans Gildemeister (2) (Paraguay) Víctor Pecci	(Australia) David Graham (Hungary) Balázs Taróczy	6–3, 1–6, 6–4
1986	(Chile) Hans Gildemeister (3) (Ecuador) Andrés Gómez (2)	(Brazil) Ricardo Acioly (Brazil) César Kist	6–3, 7–5
1987	(United States) Gary Donnelly (United States) Peter Fleming	(Australia) Laurie Warder (United States) Blaine Willenborg	6–2, 7–6
1988	(United States) Rick Leach (United States) Jim Pugh	(Mexico) Jorge Lozano (United States) Todd Witsken	6–3, 6–7, 6–2
1989	(United Kingdom) Neil Broad (South Africa) Gary Muller	(United States) Jim Grabb (United States) Patrick McEnroe	6–7, 7–6, 6–4
↓ ATP Tour 500 ↓
1990	(Canada) Grant Connell (Canada) Glenn Michibata	(Mexico) Jorge Lozano (United States) Todd Witsken	6–3, 6–7, 6–2
1991	(United States) Scott Davis (United States) David Pate	(United States) Ken Flach (United States) Robert Seguso	6–4, 6–2
1992	(United States) Bret Garnett (United States) Jared Palmer	(United States) Ken Flach (United States) Todd Witsken	6–2, 6–3
1993	(Zimbabwe) Byron Black (United States) Rick Leach (2)	(Canada) Grant Connell (United States) Patrick Galbraith	6–4, 7–5
1994	(Canada) Grant Connell (2) (United States) Patrick Galbraith	(Sweden) Jonas Björkman (Switzerland) Jakob Hlasek	6–4, 4–6, 6–3
1995	(France) Olivier Delaître (United States) Jeff Tarango	(Czech Republic) Petr Korda (Czech Republic) Cyril Suk	1–6, 6–3, 6–2
1996	(Canada) Grant Connell (3) (United States) Scott Davis (2)	(United States) Doug Flach (United States) Chris Woodruff	7–6, 3–6, 6–3
1997	(United States) Luke Jensen (United States) Murphy Jensen	(South Africa) Neville Godwin (Netherlands) Fernon Wibier	6–4, 6–4
1998	(South Africa) Grant Stafford (Zimbabwe) Kevin Ullyett	(South Africa) Wayne Ferreira (United States) Patrick Galbraith	6–2, 6–4
1999	(United States) Justin Gimelstob (Canada) Sébastien Lareau	(South Africa) David Adams (South Africa) John-Laffnie de Jager	7–5, 6–7^{(2–7)}, 6–3
2000	(United States) Alex O'Brien (United States) Jared Palmer (2)	(United States) Andre Agassi (Armenia) Sargis Sargsian	7–5, 6–1
2001	(Czech Republic) Martin Damm (Germany) David Prinosil	(United States) Bob Bryan (United States) Mike Bryan	7–6^{(7–5)}, 6–3
2002	(Zimbabwe) Wayne Black (Zimbabwe) Kevin Ullyett (2)	(United States) Bob Bryan (United States) Mike Bryan	3–6, 6–3, 7–5
↓ ATP Tour 250 ↓
2003	(Russia) Yevgeny Kafelnikov (Armenia) Sargis Sargsian	(South Africa) Chris Haggard (Australia) Paul Hanley	7–5, 4–6, 6–2
2004	(South Africa) Chris Haggard (South Africa) Robbie Koenig	(United States) Travis Parrott (Russia) Dmitry Tursunov	7–6^{(7–3)}, 6–1
2005	(United States) Bob Bryan (United States) Mike Bryan	(Zimbabwe) Wayne Black (Zimbabwe) Kevin Ullyett	6–4, 6–2
2006	(United States) Bob Bryan (2) (United States) Mike Bryan (2)	(Australia) Paul Hanley (Zimbabwe) Kevin Ullyett	6–3, 5–7, [10–3]
2007	(United States) Bob Bryan (3) (United States) Mike Bryan (3)	(Israel) Jonathan Erlich (Israel) Andy Ram	7–6^{(7–5)}, 3–6, [10–7]
2008	(France) Marc Gicquel (Sweden) Robert Lindstedt	(Brazil) Bruno Soares (Zimbabwe) Kevin Ullyett	7–6^{(8–6)}, 6–3
↓ ATP Tour 500 ↓
2009	(Czech Republic) Martin Damm (2) (Sweden) Robert Lindstedt (2)	(Poland) Mariusz Fyrstenberg (Poland) Marcin Matkowski	7–5, 7–6^{(7–3)}
2010	(United States) Mardy Fish (The Bahamas) Mark Knowles	(Czech Republic) Tomáš Berdych (Czech Republic) Radek Štěpánek	4–6, 7–6^{(9–7)}, [10–7]
2011	(France) Michaël Llodra (Serbia) Nenad Zimonjić	(Sweden) Robert Lindstedt (Romania) Horia Tecău	6–7^{(3–7)}, 7–6^{(8–6)}, [10–7]
2012	(Philippines) Treat Conrad Huey (United Kingdom) Dominic Inglot	(South Africa) Kevin Anderson (United States) Sam Querrey	7–6^{(9–7)}, 6–7^{(9–11)}, [10–5]
2013	(France) Julien Benneteau (Serbia) Nenad Zimonjić (2)	(United States) Mardy Fish (Czech Republic) Radek Štěpánek	7–6^{(7–5)}, 7–5
2014	(Netherlands) Jean-Julien Rojer (Romania) Horia Tecău	(Australia) Sam Groth (India) Leander Paes	7–5, 6–4
2015	(United States) Bob Bryan (4) (United States) Mike Bryan (4)	(Croatia) Ivan Dodig (Brazil) Marcelo Melo	6–4, 6–2
2016	(Canada) Daniel Nestor (France) Édouard Roger-Vasselin	(Poland) Łukasz Kubot (Austria) Alexander Peya	7–6^{(7–3)}, 7–6^{(7–4)}
2017	(Finland) Henri Kontinen (Australia) John Peers	(Poland) Łukasz Kubot (Brazil) Marcelo Melo	7–6^{(7–5)}, 6–4
2018	(United Kingdom) Jamie Murray (Brazil) Bruno Soares	(United States) Mike Bryan (France) Édouard Roger-Vasselin	3–6, 6–3, [10–4]
2019	(South Africa) Raven Klaasen (New Zealand) Michael Venus	(Netherlands) Jean-Julien Rojer (Romania) Horia Tecău	3–6, 6–3, [10–2]
2020	Canceled due to the COVID-19 pandemic		
2021	(South Africa) Raven Klaasen (2) (Japan) Ben McLachlan	(United Kingdom) Neal Skupski (New Zealand) Michael Venus	7–6^{(7–4)}, 6–4
2022	(Australia) Nick Kyrgios (United States) Jack Sock	(Croatia) Ivan Dodig (United States) Austin Krajicek	7–5, 6–4
2023	(Argentina) Máximo González (Argentina) Andrés Molteni	(United States) Mackenzie McDonald (United States) Ben Shelton	6–7, 6–2, [10-8]
2024	(United States) Nathaniel Lammons (United States) Jackson Withrow	(Brazil) Rafael Matos (Brazil) Marcelo Melo	7–5, 6–3
2025	(Italy) Simone Bolelli (Italy) Andrea Vavassori	(Monaco) Hugo Nys (France) Édouard Roger-Vasselin	6–3, 6–4
2026	(United Kingdom) Julian Cash (United Kingdom) Lloyd Glasspool	(United States) Austin Krajicek (Croatia) Nikola Mektić	6–3, 6–4

=== Women's doubles ===
Year	Champions	Runners-up	Score
2011	(India) Sania Mirza (Kazakhstan) Yaroslava Shvedova	(Belarus) Olga Govortsova (Russia) Alla Kudryavtseva	6–3, 6–3
2012	(Japan) Shuko Aoyama (Chinese Taipei) Chang Kai-chen	(United States) Irina Falconi (South Africa) Chanelle Scheepers	7–5, 6–2
2013	(Japan) Shuko Aoyama (2) (Russia) Vera Dushevina	(Canada) Eugenie Bouchard (United States) Taylor Townsend	6–3, 6–3
2014	(Japan) Shuko Aoyama (3) (Canada) Gabriela Dabrowski	(Japan) Hiroko Kuwata (Japan) Kurumi Nara	6–1, 6–2
2015	(Switzerland) Belinda Bencic (France) Kristina Mladenovic	(Spain) Lara Arruabarrena (Slovenia) Andreja Klepač	7–5, 7–6^{(9–7)}
2016	(Romania) Monica Niculescu (Belgium) Yanina Wickmayer	(Japan) Shuko Aoyama (Japan) Risa Ozaki	6–4, 6–3
2017	(Japan) Shuko Aoyama (4) (Czech Republic) Renata Voráčová	(Canada) Eugenie Bouchard (United States) Sloane Stephens	6–3, 6–2
2018	(China) Han Xinyun (Croatia) Darija Jurak	(Chile) Alexa Guarachi (New Zealand) Erin Routliffe	6–3, 6–2
2019	(United States) Caty McNally (United States) Coco Gauff	(United States) Maria Sanchez (Hungary) Fanny Stollar	6–2, 6–2
2020–21	Canceled due to the COVID-19 pandemic		
↓ WTA 250 ↓
2022	(United States) Jessica Pegula (New Zealand) Erin Routliffe	Anna Kalinskaya (United States) Caty McNally	6–3, 5–7, [12–10]
↓ WTA 500 ↓
2023	(Germany) Laura Siegemund; Vera Zvonareva	(Chile) Alexa Guarachi (Romania) Monica Niculescu	6–4, 6–4
2024	(United States) Asia Muhammad (United States) Taylor Townsend	(China) Jiang Xinyu (Chinese Taipei) Wu Fang-hsien	7–6^{(7–0)}, 6–3
2025	(United States) Taylor Townsend (2) (China) Zhang Shuai	(United States) Caroline Dolehide (United States) Sofia Kenin	6–1, 6–1
2026	(New Zealand) Erin Routliffe (2) (Indonesia) Aldila Sutjiadi	(Slovenia) Andreja Klepač (Japan) Makoto Ninomiya	6–4, 6–1

== Event names ==
Official

- Washington Star International (1969–70)
- Washington Star Open (1971-81)
- Washington Classic (1982-91)
- Washington Tennis Classic (1992-2011)
- Washington Open (2012– current)

Sponsored

- Sovran Bank Classic (1982–1992)
- Newsweek Tennis Classic (1993)
- Legg Mason Tennis Classic (1994–2011)
- Citi Open (2012–2022)
- Mubadala Citi DC Open (2023-current)

== See also ==
- Virginia Slims of Washington – women's tournament (1972–1991)
- Washington Kastles – World TeamTennis (WTT) franchise
- Sports in Washington, D.C.
