= 2010 Legg Mason Tennis Classic =

- Date: August 1–8
- Edition: 42nd
- Category: ATP World Tour 500
- Draw: 48S / 16D
- Prize money: $1,165,500
- Surface: Hard / outdoor
- Location: Washington, D.C., United States

Champions

Singles
- (Argentina) David Nalbandian

Doubles
- (United States) Mardy Fish / (The Bahamas) Mark Knowles
← 2009 ·	Washington Open	· 2011 →

The 2010 Legg Mason Tennis Classic was a tennis tournament played on outdoor hard courts. It was the 42nd edition of this event and was part of the ATP World Tour 500 series of the 2010 ATP World Tour. It took place at the William H.G. FitzGerald Tennis Center in Washington, D.C., USA, from August 1 through August 8, 2010. Unseeded David Nalbandian, who entered the main draw on a wildcard, won the singles title.

== ATP entrants ==
List of Association of Tennis Professionals (ATP) singles entrants, as of July 26, 2010.

=== Seeds ===
Country	Player	Rank^{[a]}	Seed^{[b]}
CZE	Tomáš Berdych	8	1
USA	Andy Roddick	9	2
ESP	Fernando Verdasco	10	3
CRO	Marin Čilić	13	4
USA	John Isner	19	5
USA	Sam Querrey	20	6
SUI	Stanislas Wawrinka	24	7
CYP	Marcos Baghdatis	26	8
LAT	Ernests Gulbis	28	9
CZE	Radek Štěpánek	29	10
AUS	Lleyton Hewitt	30	11
FRA	Julien Benneteau	32	12
FRA	Gilles Simon	33	13
FRA	Michaël Llodra	34	14
USA	Mardy Fish	35	15
KAZ	Andrey Golubev	37	16

=== Other entrants ===
The following players received wildcards into the singles main draw

- (United States) James Blake
- (Argentina) David Nalbandian
- (Spain) Fernando Verdasco
- (France) Richard Gasquet

The following players received entry from the qualifying draw:

- (Argentina) Brian Dabul
- (United States) Kevin Kim
- (Russia) Igor Kunitsyn
- (Japan) Kei Nishikori
- (United States) Ryan Sweeting
- (Slovenia) Grega Žemlja

== Finals ==
=== Singles ===
(Argentina) David Nalbandian defeated (Cyprus) Marcos Baghdatis, 6–2, 7–6^{(7–4)}

- It was Nalbandian's first title of the year and 11th of his career.

=== Doubles ===
(United States) Mardy Fish / (The Bahamas) Mark Knowles defeated (Czech Republic) Tomáš Berdych / (Czech Republic) Radek Štěpánek, 4–6, 7–6^{(9–7)}, [10–7]
