= 2009 Legg Mason Tennis Classic – Singles =

Singles
- 2009 Legg Mason Tennis Classic

Final
- Champion: (Argentina) Juan Martín del Potro
- Runner-up: (United States) Andy Roddick
- Score: 3–6, 7–5, 7–6^{(8–6)}

Details
- Draw: 48 (6Q / 3WC)
- Seeds: 16

Events
| Singles | Doubles |
| ← 2008 · | Washington Open | · 2010 → |

Juan Martín del Potro was the defending champion, and won the title for the second successive year in the final 3–6, 7–5, 7–6^{(8–6)}, over Andy Roddick.

== Seeds ==
All seeds receive a bye into the second round.

1. (United States) Andy Roddick (final)
2. (Argentina) Juan Martín del Potro (champion)
3. (France) Jo-Wilfried Tsonga (second round)
4. (Chile) Fernando González (semifinals)
5. (Sweden) Robin Söderling (quarterfinals, withdrew due to right elbow injury)
6. (Croatia) Marin Čilić (second round)
7. (Spain) Tommy Robredo (second round)
8. (Czech Republic) Tomáš Berdych (quarterfinals)
9. (United States) Mardy Fish (second round)
10. (Germany) Tommy Haas (quarterfinals)
11. (Croatia) Ivo Karlović (quarterfinals)
12. (Serbia) Viktor Troicki (second round, retired due to right foot injury)
13. (Russia) Igor Andreev (second round)
14. (Russia) Dmitry Tursunov (second round)
15. (Israel) Dudi Sela (second round)
16. (United States) Sam Querrey (third round)

== Draw ==
=== Key ===
- Q = Qualifier
- WC = Wild card
- LL = Lucky loser
- Alt = Alternate
- ITF = ITF entry
- PR = Protected ranking
- SR = Special ranking
- SE = Special exempt
- JE = Junior exempt
- JR = Junior Accelerator Programme entrant
- CO = College Accelerator Programme entrant
- NG = Next Gen Accelerator Program entrant
- w/o = Walkover
- r = Retired
- d = Defaulted

=== Finals ===
Quarterfinals
1 | (United States) Andy Roddick | 7^{7} | 7^{7}
11 | (Croatia) Ivo Karlović | 6^{4} | 6^{5}
(United States) John Isner | 6 | 6^{10} | 6
8 | (Czech Republic) Tomáš Berdych | 3 | 7^{12} | 2
10 | (Germany) Tommy Haas | 5 | 4
4 | (Chile) Fernando González | 7 | 6
5 | (Sweden) Robin Söderling
2 | (Argentina) Juan Martín del Potro | w/o

Semifinals
1 | (United States) Andy Roddick | 6^{3} | 6 | 7
(United States) John Isner | 7^{7} | 2 | 5
4 | (Chile) Fernando González | 6^{2} | 3
2 | (Argentina) Juan Martín del Potro | 7^{7} | 6

Final
1 | (United States) Andy Roddick | 6 | 5 | 6^{6}
2 | (Argentina) Juan Martín del Potro | 3 | 7 | 7^{8}

=== Top half ===
==== Section 1 ====
First round
(United States) R Ginepri | 6^{3} | 7^{7} | 6^{4}
(Germany) B Becker | 7^{7} | 6^{1} | 7^{7}
(Russia) I Kunitsyn | 7^{7} | 6
(Portugal) F Gil | 6^{1} | 4
(Argentina) L Mayer | 1 | 6 | 6^{5}
(Germany) R Schüttler | 6 | 3 | 7^{7}
Q | (Japan) Y Sugita | 0 | 6^{6}
Q | (India) S Devvarman | 6 | 7^{8}

Second round
1 | (United States) A Roddick | 6 | 6
(Germany) B Becker | 3 | 2
(Russia) I Kunitsyn | 3 | 4
16 | (United States) S Querrey | 6 | 6
11 | (Croatia) I Karlović | 6 | 7
(Germany) R Schüttler | 4 | 5
Q | (India) S Devvarman | 7 | 6
6 | (Croatia) M Čilić | 5 | 4

Third round
1 | (United States) A Roddick | 7^{7} | 6
16 | (United States) S Querrey | 6^{4} | 4
11 | (Croatia) I Karlović | 7 | 6
Q | (India) S Devvarman | 5 | 1

Quarterfinals
1 | (United States) A Roddick | 7^{7} | 7^{7}
11 | (Croatia) I Karlović | 6^{4} | 6^{5}

==== Section 2 ====
First round
(Kazakhstan) A Golubev | 6^{8} | 3
(United States) J Isner | 7^{10} | 6
Q | (France) S de Chaunac | 6 | 7^{9}
(Uzbekistan) D Istomin | 3 | 6^{7}
(Germany) P Petzschner | 4 | 6 | 6
(Russia) T Gabashvili | 6 | 1 | 4
(United States) K Kim | 5 | 6 | 3
(Latvia) E Gulbis | 7 | 3 | 6

Second round
3 | (France) J-W Tsonga | 6 | 6^{2} | 6^{4}
(United States) J Isner | 4 | 7^{7} | 7^{7}
Q | (France) S de Chaunac | 3 | 7^{7} | 7
14 | (Russia) D Tursunov | 6 | 6^{3} | 5
9 | (United States) M Fish | 6 | 4 | 1
(Germany) P Petzschner | 4 | 6 | 6
(Latvia) E Gulbis | 2 | 6^{6}
8 | (Czech Republic) T Berdych | 6 | 7^{8}

Third round
(United States) J Isner | 6 | 6
Q | (France) S de Chaunac | 2 | 4
(Germany) P Petzschner | 6 | 3 | 3
8 | (Czech Republic) T Berdych | 4 | 6 | 6

Quarterfinals
(United States) J Isner | 6 | 6^{10} | 6
8 | (Czech Republic) T Berdych | 3 | 7^{12} | 2

=== Bottom half ===
==== Section 3 ====
First round
(Spain) JC Ferrero | 6 | 6^{5} | 6
LL | (Ecuador) N Lapentti | 4 | 7^{7} | 0
Q | (Colombia) S Giraldo | 4 | 3
(Canada) F Dancevic | 6 | 6
(Chile) P Capdeville | 6 | 2 | 4
(United States) W Odesnik | 4 | 6 | 6
Q | (Colombia) A Falla | 6 | 6
Q | (United States) J Witten | 1 | 4

Second round
7 | (Spain) T Robredo | 3 | 2
(Spain) JC Ferrero | 6 | 6
(Canada) F Dancevic | 1 | 6 | 4
10 | (Germany) T Haas | 6 | 4 | 6
13 | (Russia) I Andreev | 6 | 4 | 4
(United States) W Odesnik | 4 | 6 | 6
Q | (Colombia) A Falla | 5 | 5
4 | (Chile) F González | 7 | 7

Third round
(Spain) JC Ferrero | 5 | 6 | 1
10 | (Germany) T Haas | 7 | 2 | 6
(United States) W Odesnik | 2 | 4
4 | (Chile) F González | 6 | 6

Quarterfinals
10 | (Germany) T Haas | 5 | 4
4 | (Chile) F González | 7 | 6

==== Section 4 ====
First round
(Russia) M Youzhny | 7 | 3 | 6
(United States) R Kendrick | 5 | 6 | 1
WC | (Poland) J Janowicz | 5 | 6 | 4
(France) M Gicquel | 7 | 2 | 6
(Australia) L Hewitt | 7 | 6
WC | (United States) D Young | 5 | 2
(Chinese Taipei) Y-h Lu | 4 | 6 | 7
WC | (United States) M Russell | 6 | 1 | 5

Second round
5 | (Sweden) R Söderling | 6 | 6
(Russia) M Youzhny | 3 | 1
(France) M Gicquel | 3
12 | (Serbia) V Troicki | 0^{r}
15 | (Israel) D Sela | 3 | 6 | 2
(Australia) L Hewitt | 6 | 2 | 6
(Chinese Taipei) Y-h Lu | 6 | 3 | 2
2 | (Argentina) JM del Potro | 4 | 6 | 6

Third round
5 | (Sweden) R Söderling | 7 | 5 | 6
(France) M Gicquel | 5 | 7 | 3
(Australia) L Hewitt | 6 | 3 | 6^{2}
2 | (Argentina) JM del Potro | 4 | 6 | 7^{7}

Quarterfinals
5 | (Sweden) R Söderling
2 | (Argentina) JM del Potro | w/o

== Qualifying ==
=== Seeds ===
1. (Ecuador) Nicolás Lapentti (qualifying competition, lucky loser)
2. (France) Josselin Ouanna (qualifying competition)
3. (Australia) Chris Guccione (first round)
4. (Colombia) Santiago Giraldo (qualified)
5. (United States) Brendan Evans (qualifying competition)
6. (Poland) Łukasz Kubot (qualifying competition)
7. (Russia) Alex Bogomolov Jr. (first round)
8. (Andorra) Laurent Recouderc (first round)
9. (India) Somdev Devvarman (qualified)
10. (France) Sébastien de Chaunac (qualified)
11. (Colombia) Alejandro Falla (qualified)
12. (United States) Todd Widom (first round)

=== Qualifiers ===
1. (Colombia) Alejandro Falla
2. (India) Somdev Devvarman
3. (Japan) Yūichi Sugita
4. (Colombia) Santiago Giraldo
5. (France) Sébastien de Chaunac
6. (United States) Jesse Witten

=== Lucky loser ===
1. (Ecuador) Nicolás Lapentti

=== Draw ===
==== First qualifier ====
First round
1 | (Ecuador) Nicolás Lapentti | 6 | 6
(Czech Republic) Lukáš Dlouhý | 3 | 3
WC | (United States) Scott Oudsema | 6 | 6^{2} | 0^{r}
11 | (Colombia) Alejandro Falla | 1 | 7^{7} | 1

Qualifying competition
1 | (Ecuador) Nicolás Lapentti | 2 | 6 | 4
11 | (Colombia) Alejandro Falla | 6 | 3 | 6

==== Second qualifier ====
First round
2 | (France) Josselin Ouanna | 6 | 7
(Russia) Alexander Kudryavtsev | 3 | 5
(Japan) Tatsuma Ito | 3 | 3
9 | (India) Somdev Devvarman | 6 | 6

Qualifying competition
2 | (France) Josselin Ouanna | 6 | 1 | 5
9 | (India) Somdev Devvarman | 2 | 6 | 7

==== Third qualifier ====
First round
3 | (Australia) Chris Guccione | 6^{3} | 3
(Austria) Oliver Marach | 7^{7} | 6
(Japan) Yūichi Sugita | 6 | 4 | 6
7 | (Russia) Alex Bogomolov Jr. | 1 | 6 | 1

Qualifying competition
(Austria) Oliver Marach | 4 | 0^{r}
(Japan) Yūichi Sugita | 6 | 2

==== Fourth qualifier ====
First round
4 | (Colombia) Santiago Giraldo | 6 | 6
WC | (United States) Mitchell Frank | 2 | 3
(Japan) Takao Suzuki | 6^{4} | 6 | 6
12 | (United States) Todd Widom | 7^{7} | 2 | 3

Qualifying competition
4 | (Colombia) Santiago Giraldo | 3 | 6
(Japan) Takao Suzuki | 6 | 2^{r}

==== Fifth qualifier ====
First round
5 | (United States) Brendan Evans | 6 | 6
WC | (United States) Junior Alexander Ore | 1 | 2
WC | (United States) Denis Kudla | 3 | 6 | 2
10 | (France) Sébastien de Chaunac | 6 | 4 | 6

Qualifying competition
5 | (United States) Brendan Evans | 6 | 6^{3} | 6^{4}
10 | (France) Sébastien de Chaunac | 4 | 7^{7} | 7^{7}

==== Sixth qualifier ====
First round
6 | (Poland) Łukasz Kubot | 6 | 7^{7}
(United Kingdom) Dan Evans | 2 | 6^{0}
(United States) Jesse Witten | 6 | 6
8 | (Andorra) Laurent Recouderc | 2 | 4

Qualifying competition
6 | (Poland) Łukasz Kubot | 6 | 6^{5} | 4
(United States) Jesse Witten | 3 | 7^{7} | 6
