= 2009 Legg Mason Tennis Classic – Doubles =

Doubles
- 2009 Legg Mason Tennis Classic

Final
- Champion: (Czech Republic) Martin Damm (Sweden) Robert Lindstedt
- Runner-up: (Poland) Mariusz Fyrstenberg (Poland) Marcin Matkowski
- Score: 7–5, 7–6^{(7–3)}

Details
- Draw: 16
- Seeds: 4

Events
| Singles | Doubles |
| ← 2008 · | Washington Open | · 2010 → |

Marc Gicquel and Robert Lindstedt were the defending champions, but Gicquel chose not to participate that year.
Robert Lindstedt partnered with Martin Damm, and won in the final over Mariusz Fyrstenberg and Marcin Matkowski, 7–5, 7–6^{(7–3)}.

== Seeds ==
1. (United States) Bob Bryan / (United States) Mike Bryan (withdrew due to a hip injury for Mike Bryan)
2. (Canada) Daniel Nestor / (Serbia) Nenad Zimonjić (semifinals, withdrew due to left triceps injury for Daniel Nestor)
3. (India) Mahesh Bhupathi / (The Bahamas) Mark Knowles (quarterfinals)
4. (Brazil) Bruno Soares / (Zimbabwe) Kevin Ullyett (first round)
5. (Poland) Mariusz Fyrstenberg / (Poland) Marcin Matkowski (final)

== Draw ==
=== Key ===
- Q = Qualifier
- WC = Wild card
- LL = Lucky loser
- Alt = Alternate
- SE = Special exempt
- PR = Protected ranking
- ITF = ITF entry
- JE = Junior exempt
- w/o = Walkover
- r = Retired
- d = Defaulted
- SR = Special ranking

=== Draw ===
First round
5 | (Poland) M Fyrstenberg (Poland) M Matkowski | 7 | 6
(Czech Republic) T Berdych (Czech Republic) L Dlouhý | 5 | 3
(Australia) S Huss (United Kingdom) R Hutchins | 6 | 6
ALT | (Brazil) M Melo (Brazil) A Sá | 1 | 4
4 | (Brazil) B Soares (Zimbabwe) K Ullyett | 6 | 5 | [10]
WC | (Australia) C Guccione (Australia) L Hewitt | 4 | 7 | [12]
(Sweden) S Aspelin (Australia) P Hanley | 4 | 7^{7} | [4]
(United States) T Parrott (Slovakia) F Polášek | 6 | 6^{1} | [10]
(Czech Republic) M Damm (Sweden) R Lindstedt | 7 | 7
(Poland) Ł Kubot (Austria) O Marach | 5 | 5
(Belarus) M Mirnyi (Israel) A Ram | 6^{6} | 6 | [7]
3 | (India) M Bhupathi (The Bahamas) M Knowles | 7^{8} | 2 | [10]
(Chile) F González (Spain) T Robredo | 3 | 7^{7} | [10]
WC | (United States) J Isner (United States) S Querrey | 6 | 6^{5} | [6]
(South Africa) J Coetzee (Israel) J Erlich | 3^{r}
2 | (Canada) D Nestor (Serbia) N Zimonjić | 4

Quarterfinals
5 | (Poland) M Fyrstenberg (Poland) M Matkowski | 6 | 7
(Australia) S Huss (United Kingdom) R Hutchins | 4 | 5
WC | (Australia) C Guccione (Australia) L Hewitt | 2 | 2
(United States) T Parrott (Slovakia) F Polášek | 6 | 6
(Czech Republic) M Damm (Sweden) R Lindstedt | 3 | 6 | [16]
3 | (India) M Bhupathi (The Bahamas) M Knowles | 6 | 1 | [14]
(Chile) F González (Spain) T Robredo | 3 | 4
2 | (Canada) D Nestor (Serbia) N Zimonjić | 6 | 6

Semifinals
5 | (Poland) M Fyrstenberg (Poland) M Matkowski | 7^{8} | 7^{7}
(United States) T Parrott (Slovakia) F Polášek | 6^{6} | 6^{5}
(Czech Republic) M Damm (Sweden) R Lindstedt | w/o
2 | (Canada) D Nestor (Serbia) N Zimonjić

Final
5 | (Poland) M Fyrstenberg (Poland) M Matkowski | 5 | 6^{3}
(Czech Republic) M Damm (Sweden) R Lindstedt | 7 | 7^{7}
