= 2011 Legg Mason Tennis Classic – Singles =

Singles
- 2011 Legg Mason Tennis Classic

Final
- Champion: (Czech Republic) Radek Štěpánek
- Runner-up: (France) Gaël Monfils
- Score: 6–4, 6–4

Details
- Draw: 48
- Seeds: 16

Events
Singles	Doubles
← 2010 ·	Washington Open	· 2012 →

David Nalbandian was the defending champion, but lost to James Blake in the second round.

Radek Štěpánek won the title, defeating Gaël Monfils 6–4, 6–4, in the final.

== Seeds ==
All seeds received a bye into the second round.

1. (France) Gaël Monfils (final)
2. (United States) Mardy Fish (withdrew due to a bruised right heel)
3. (Serbia) Viktor Troicki (quarterfinals)
4. (Austria) Jürgen Melzer (second round, retired due to left quad injury)
5. (Spain) Fernando Verdasco (quarterfinals)
6. (Serbia) Janko Tipsarević (quarterfinals)
7. (Cyprus) Marcos Baghdatis (quarterfinals)
8. (Argentina) David Nalbandian (second round)
9. (Russia) Nikolay Davydenko (third round)
10. (France) Michaël Llodra (second round, retired)
11. (United States) John Isner (semifinals)
12. (Brazil) Thomaz Bellucci (third round)
13. (South Africa) Kevin Anderson (third round)
14. (Belgium) Xavier Malisse (second round, retired due to right arm injury)
15. (Russia) Dmitry Tursunov (third round)
16. (Finland) Jarkko Nieminen (third round)

== Draw ==
=== Key ===
- Q = Qualifier
- WC = Wild card
- LL = Lucky loser
- Alt = Alternate
- ITF = ITF entry
- PR = Protected ranking
- SR = Special ranking
- SE = Special exempt
- JE = Junior exempt
- JR = Junior Accelerator Programme entrant
- CO = College Accelerator Programme entrant
- NG = Next Gen Accelerator Program entrant
- w/o = Walkover
- r = Retired
- d = Defaulted

=== Finals ===
Quarterfinals
1/WC	(France) Gaël Monfils	6	6
6	(Serbia) Janko Tipsarević	4	4
3	(Serbia) Viktor Troicki	6^{5}	6	1
11	(United States) John Isner	7^{7}	3	6
7	(Cyprus) Marcos Baghdatis	3	6^{4}
(United States) Donald Young	6	7^{7}
5/WC	(Spain) Fernando Verdasco	4	4
(Czech Republic) Radek Štěpánek	6	6

Semifinals
1/WC	(France) Gaël Monfils	6	3	7^{8}
11	(United States) John Isner	4	6	6^{6}
(United States) Donald Young	3	3
(Czech Republic) Radek Štěpánek	6	6

Final
1/WC	(France) Gaël Monfils	4	4
(Czech Republic) Radek Štěpánek	6	6

=== Top half ===
==== Section 1 ====
First round
(United States) R Sweeting	6	6
(United States) A Bogomolov Jr.	2	4
(Turkey) M İlhan	5	0
(Italy) F Cipolla	7	6
Q	(United States) T Smyczek	6	6^{3}	6^{3}
(Bulgaria) G Dimitrov	4	7^{7}	7^{7}
(Italy) P Lorenzi	5	1
(Germany) M Berrer	7	6

Second round
1/WC	(France) G Monfils	6	7^{7}
(United States) R Sweeting	3	6^{3}
(Italy) F Cipolla	1	4
15	(Russia) D Tursunov	6	6
10	(France) M Llodra	3	r
(Bulgaria) G Dimitrov	4
(Germany) M Berrer	3	4
6	(Serbia) J Tipsarević	6	6

Third round
1/WC	(France) G Monfils	6	7^{11}
15	(Russia) D Tursunov	2	6^{9}
(Bulgaria) G Dimitrov	4	2
6	(Serbia) J Tipsarević	6	6

Quarterfinals
1/WC	(France) G Monfils	6	6
6	(Serbia) J Tipsarević	4	4

==== Section 2 ====
First round
WC	(United States) R Harrison	6	1	6
(Germany) M Zverev	4	6	1
(Colombia) A Falla	6^{3}	3
Q	(Australia) C Guccione	7^{7}	6
WC	(United States) D Kudla	4	2
(Germany) T Kamke	6	6
(United States) J Blake	6	6
(Japan) T Ito	3	3

Second round
3	(Serbia) V Troicki	7	6
WC	(United States) R Harrison	5	2
Q	(Australia) C Guccione	6	2	6^{0}
13	(South Africa) K Anderson	3	6	7^{7}
11	(United States) J Isner	6	6
(Germany) T Kamke	1	3
(United States) J Blake	6	6
8	(Argentina) D Nalbandian	2	4

Third round
3	(Serbia) V Troicki	6	6
13	(South Africa) K Anderson	3	3
11	(United States) J Isner	7^{7}	1	7^{7}
(United States) J Blake	6^{0}	6	6^{4}

Quarterfinals
3	(Serbia) V Troicki	6^{5}	6	1
11	(United States) J Isner	7^{7}	3	6

=== Bottom half ===
==== Section 3 ====
First round
(Germany) D Gremelmayr	2	3
(India) S Devvarman	6	6
(Germany) T Haas	6	6
LL	(Bosnia and Herzegovina) A Delić	2	3
(Croatia) I Karlović	4	6^{4}
(United States) M Russell	6	7^{7}
Q	(New Zealand) A Sitak	0	3
(United States) D Young	6	6

Second round
7	(Cyprus) M Baghdatis	6	0	7
(India) S Devvarman	2	6	5
(Germany) T Haas	6^{3}	6	3
12	(Brazil) T Bellucci	7^{7}	3	6
14	(Belgium) X Malisse	6^{4}	3	r
(United States) M Russell	7^{7}	2
(United States) D Young	6^{6}	6	3
4	(Austria) J Melzer	7^{8}	4	1^{r}

Third round
7	(Cyprus) M Baghdatis	3	6	6
12	(Brazil) T Bellucci	6	3	2
(United States) M Russell	3	3
(United States) D Young	6	6

Quarterfinals
7	(Cyprus) M Baghdatis	3	6^{4}
(United States) D Young	6	7^{7}

==== Section 4 ====
First round
Q	(Australia) M Matosevic	7^{7}	3	6
(Lithuania) R Berankis	6^{3}	6	1
Q	(United States) R Ram	1	2^{r}
Q	(Australia) M Ebden	6	3
(Luxembourg) G Müller	4	6	6^{5}
(Russia) I Kunitsyn	6	3	7^{7}
(Czech Republic) R Štěpánek	6^{2}	6	6
(Germany) P Petzschner	7^{7}	4	0

Second round
5/WC	(Spain) F Verdasco	6	6
Q	(Australia) M Matosevic	4	4
Q	(Australia) M Ebden	3	5
9	(Russia) N Davydenko	6	7
16	(Finland) J Nieminen	7	6
(Russia) I Kunitsyn	5	4
(Czech Republic) R Štěpánek	6	6
LL	(United States) W Odesnik	1	1

Third round
5/WC	(Spain) F Verdasco	6	7
9	(Russia) N Davydenko	4	5
16	(Finland) J Nieminen	4	6	2
(Czech Republic) R Štěpánek	6	3	6

Quarterfinals
5/WC	(Spain) F Verdasco	4	4
(Czech Republic) R Štěpánek	6	6
