= 2011 Legg Mason Tennis Classic – Singles qualifying =

This article displays the qualifying draw of the 2011 Legg Mason Tennis Classic.

== Players ==
=== Seeds ===
1. (Australia) Matthew Ebden (qualified)
2. (Australia) Marinko Matosevic (qualified)
3. (United States) Wayne Odesnik (qualifying competition, lucky loser)
4. (Dominican Republic) Víctor Estrella (first round)
5. (United States) Tim Smyczek (qualified)
6. (Australia) Chris Guccione (qualified)
7. (United States) Rajeev Ram (qualified)
8. (Bosnia and Herzegovina) Amer Delić (qualifying competition)
9. (United States) Alex Kuznetsov (qualifying competition)
10. (United States) Jesse Witten (qualifying competition)
11. (New Zealand) Artem Sitak (qualified)
12. (United States) Phillip Simmonds (qualifying competition)

=== Qualifiers ===
1. (Australia) Matthew Ebden
2. (Australia) Marinko Matosevic
3. (United States) Rajeev Ram
4. (New Zealand) Artem Sitak
5. (United States) Tim Smyczek
6. (Australia) Chris Guccione

=== Lucky losers ===
1. (United States) Wayne Odesnik

== Qualifying draw ==
=== First qualifier ===
First round
1	(Australia) Matthew Ebden	6	3	6
(United States) Mitchell Frank	3	6	3
(Haiti) Olivier Sajous	7^{7}	4	4
12	(United States) Phillip Simmonds	6^{5}	6	6

Qualifying competition
1	(Australia) Matthew Ebden	7^{7}	6
12	(United States) Phillip Simmonds	6^{4}	3

=== Second qualifier ===
First round
2	(Australia) Marinko Matosevic	6	6
(United States) Michael Shabaz	3	1
WC	(United States) Henry Steer	1	1
8	(Bosnia and Herzegovina) Amer Delić	6	6

Qualifying competition
2	(Australia) Marinko Matosevic	7^{7}	6
8	(Bosnia and Herzegovina) Amer Delić	6^{5}	4

=== Third qualifier ===
First round
3	(United States) Wayne Odesnik	6	6
(United States) Jesse Levine	3	4
(United States) Alexander Domijan	4	2
7	(United States) Rajeev Ram	6	6

Qualifying competition
3	(United States) Wayne Odesnik	4	4
7	(United States) Rajeev Ram	6	6

=== Fourth qualifier ===
First round
4	(Dominican Republic) Víctor Estrella	6	3	1
WC	(Chile) Nicolás Massú	2	6	6
WC	(United States) Andrew Adams	4	4
11	(New Zealand) Artem Sitak	6	6

Qualifying competition
WC	(Chile) Nicolás Massú	6^{4}	2
11	(New Zealand) Artem Sitak	7^{7}	6

=== Fifth qualifier ===
First round
5	(United States) Tim Smyczek	7	6
(Austria) Oliver Marach	5	3
WC	(United States) Jarmere Jenkins	4	6	3
9	(United States) Alex Kuznetsov	6	4	6

Qualifying competition
5	(United States) Tim Smyczek	6	6
9	(United States) Alex Kuznetsov	3	3

=== Sixth qualifier ===
First round
6	(Australia) Chris Guccione	6	6
(South Korea) Daniel Yoo	0	2
(India) Rohan Bopanna	6^{2}	0
10	(United States) Jesse Witten	7^{7}	6

Qualifying competition
6	(Australia) Chris Guccione	4	6	6
10	(United States) Jesse Witten	6	4	1
