= 2009 Legg Mason Tennis Classic =

- Date: August 1–9
- Edition: 41st
- Category: ATP World Tour 500
- Draw: 48S / 16D
- Prize money: $1,165,500
- Surface: Hard / outdoor
- Location: Washington, D.C., United States
- Venue: William H.G. FitzGerald Tennis Center

Champions

Singles
- (Argentina) Juan Martín del Potro

Doubles
- (Czech Republic) Martin Damm / (Sweden) Robert Lindstedt
- Washington Open

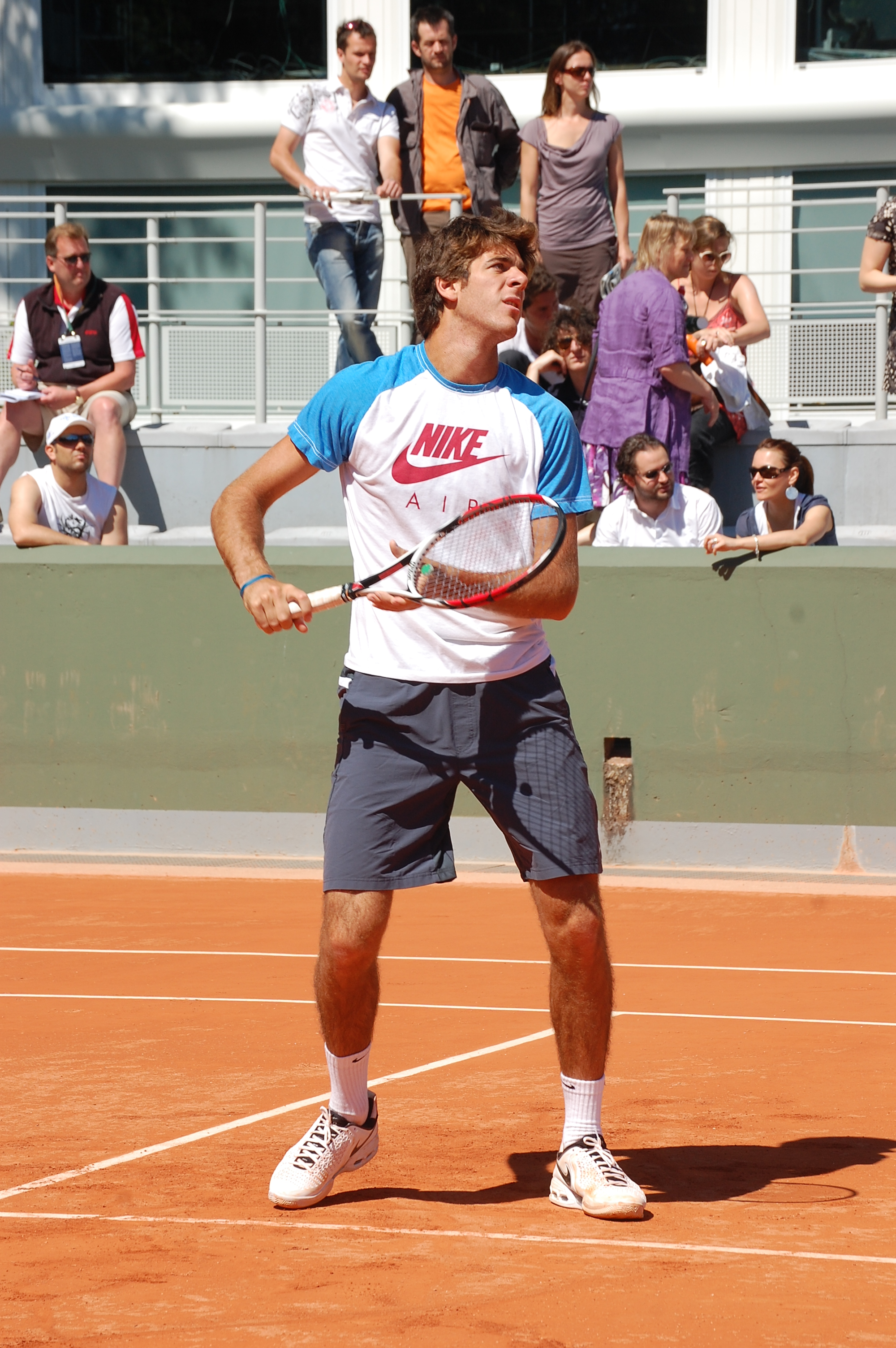
ATP World Tour No. 6 Juan Martín del Potro was the singles defending champion in Washington

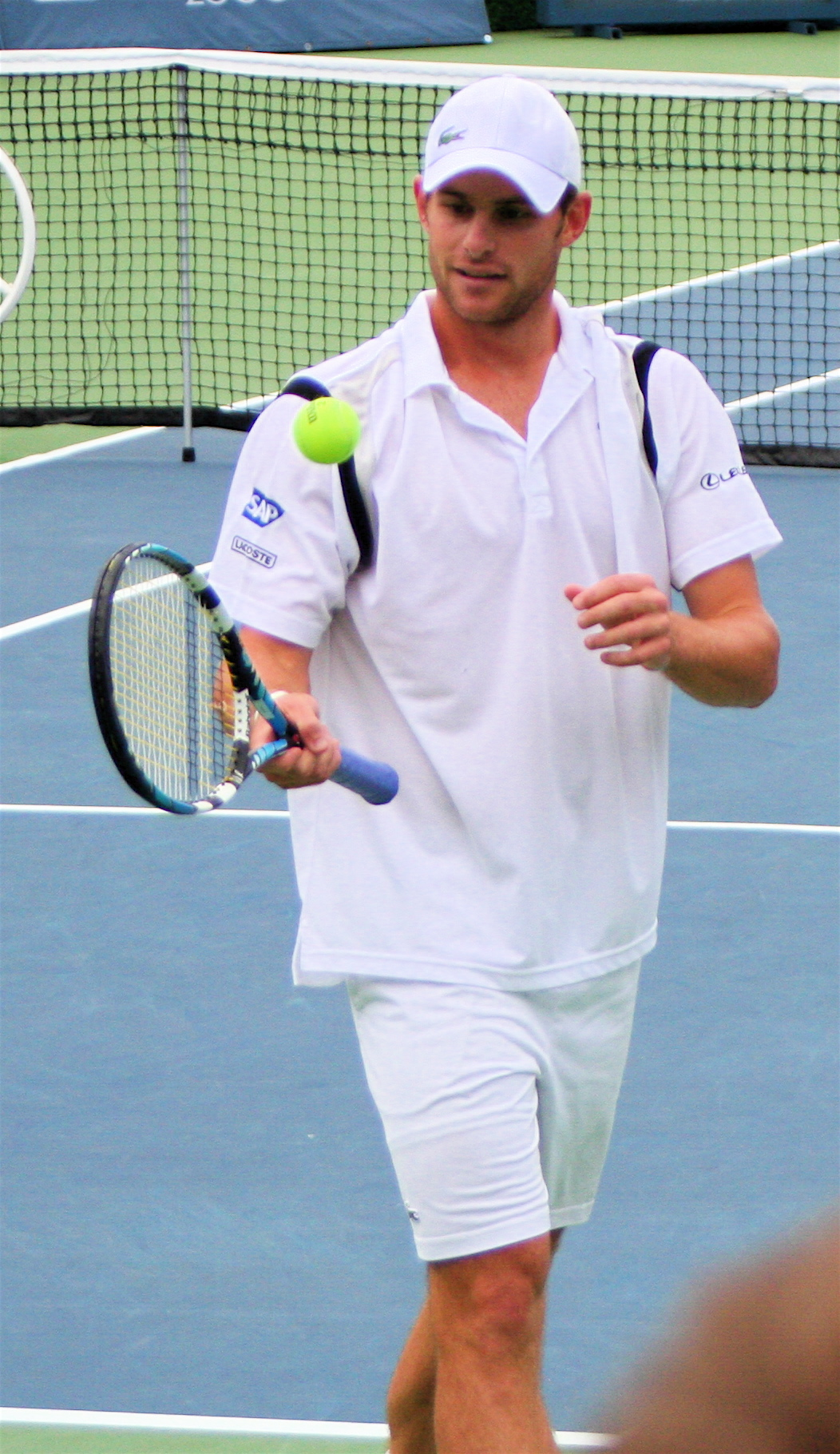
2007 champion and 2008 quarterfinalist Andy Roddick headlined the field in the singles event

The 2009 Legg Mason Tennis Classic (also known as the 2009 Legg Mason Tennis Classic presented by GEICO for sponsorship reasons) was a men's tennis tournament played on outdoor hard courts. It was the 41st edition of the event known that year as Legg Mason Tennis Classic, and was part of the ATP World Tour 500 series of the 2009 ATP World Tour. It took place at the William H.G. FitzGerald Tennis Center in Washington, D.C., United States, from August 1 through August 9, 2009. The Legg Mason Tennis Classic was the third ATP stop of the 2009 US Open Series. Unlike previous years, the men's event was field 48 players instead of 32. Second-seeded Juan Martín del Potro won the singles title.

== Finals ==
=== Singles ===
(Argentina) Juan Martín del Potro defeated (United States) Andy Roddick, 3–6, 7–5, 7–6^{(8–6)}.

- It was del Potro's second title of the year and sixth of his career.
- It was his second consecutive title at the event.

=== Doubles ===
(Czech Republic) Martin Damm / (Sweden) Robert Lindstedt defeated (Poland) Mariusz Fyrstenberg / (Poland) Marcin Matkowski, 7–5, 7–6^{(7–3)}.

== ATP entrants ==
List of Association of Tennis Professionals (ATP) singles entrants, as of July 27, 2009.

=== Seeds ===
| Country | Player | Rank^{[a]} | Seed^{[b]} |
|---|---|---|---|
| USA | Andy Roddick | 5 | 1 |
| ARG | Juan Martín del Potro | 6 | 2 |
| FRA | Jo-Wilfried Tsonga | 7 | 3 |
| CHI | Fernando González | 11 | 4 |
| SWE | Robin Söderling | 12 | 5 |
| CRO | Marin Čilić | 15 | 6 |
| ESP | Tommy Robredo | 16 | 7 |
| CZE | Tomáš Berdych | 19 | 8 |
| USA | Mardy Fish | 21 | 9 |
| GER | Tommy Haas | 22 | 10 |
| CRO | Ivo Karlović | 25 | 11 |
| SRB | Viktor Troicki | 26 | 12 |
| RUS | Igor Andreev | 27 | 13 |
| RUS | Dmitry Tursunov | 29 | 14 |
| ISR | Dudi Sela | 30 | 15 |
| USA | Sam Querrey | 32 | 16 |

=== Other entrants ===
The following players received wildcards into the singles main draw

- (Poland) Jerzy Janowicz
- (United States) Donald Young
- (United States) Michael Russell

The following players received entry from the qualifying draw:

- (India) Somdev Devvarman
- (Colombia) Alejandro Falla
- (Colombia) Santiago Giraldo
- (Japan) Yūichi Sugita
- (United States) Jesse Witten
- (France) Sébastien de Chaunac

The following player received the lucky loser spot:

- (Ecuador) Nicolás Lapentti

== Notes ==
- ^{a} ATP rankings, as of Monday, July 27, 2009.
- ^{b} Seedings based on the Monday, July 27, 2009 ATP rankings.
