= 2010 Legg Mason Tennis Classic – Doubles =

Doubles
- 2010 Legg Mason Tennis Classic

Final
- Champions: (United States) Mardy Fish (The Bahamas) Mark Knowles
- Runners-up: (Czech Republic) Tomáš Berdych (Czech Republic) Radek Štěpánek
- Score: 4–6, 7–6^{(9–7)}, [10–7]

Details
- Draw: 16
- Seeds: 4

Events
Singles	Doubles
← 2009 ·	Washington Open	· 2011 →

Martin Damm and Robert Lindstedt were the defending champions, but they chose to not compete together.
Damm partnered up with Oliver Marach, but they were eliminated by Rohan Bopanna and Aisam-ul-Haq Qureshi in the first round.
Lindstedt chose to play with Horia Tecău, but they were eliminated by Marcos Baghdatis and Stanislas Wawrinka in the first round.
Mardy Fish and Mark Knowles won the title, defeating Tomáš Berdych and Radek Štěpánek 4–6, 7–6^{(9–7)}, [10–7] in the finals.

== Seeds ==
1. (Canada) Daniel Nestor / (Serbia) Nenad Zimonjić (first round)
2. (United States) Bob Bryan / (United States) Mike Bryan (quarterfinals)
3. (Poland) Mariusz Fyrstenberg / (Poland) Marcin Matkowski (first round)
4. (Austria) Julian Knowle / (Israel) Andy Ram (semifinals)

== Draw ==
=== Key ===
- Q = Qualifier
- WC = Wild card
- LL = Lucky loser
- Alt = Alternate
- SE = Special exempt
- PR = Protected ranking
- ITF = ITF entry
- JE = Junior exempt
- w/o = Walkover
- r = Retired
- d = Defaulted
- SR = Special ranking

=== Draw ===
First round
1	(Canada) D Nestor (Serbia) N Zimonjić	4	6	[8]
(Czech Republic) T Berdych (Czech Republic) R Štěpánek	6	4	[10]
(United States) J Isner (United States) S Querrey
ALT	(Kazakhstan) A Golubev (Uzbekistan) D Istomin	w/o
4	(Austria) J Knowle (Israel) A Ram	6	6
WC	(Australia) N Healey (Australia) L Hewitt	3	2
(Sweden) R Lindstedt (Romania) H Tecău	6	4	[8]
(Cyprus) M Baghdatis (Switzerland) S Wawrinka	4	6	[10]
(United States) M Fish (The Bahamas) M Knowles	5	6	[10]
(Brazil) M Melo (Brazil) B Soares	7	4	[4]
(Sweden) S Aspelin (Australia) P Hanley	6	7^{7}
3	(Poland) M Fyrstenberg (Poland) M Matkowski	4	6^{1}
(India) R Bopanna (Pakistan) A-u-H Qureshi	7	4	[10]
(Czech Republic) M Damm (Austria) O Marach	5	6	[3]
WC	(United States) D Courtney (United States) M Shabaz	6^{6}	4
2	(United States) B Bryan (United States) M Bryan	7^{8}	6

Quarterfinals
(Czech Republic) T Berdych (Czech Republic) R Štěpánek	w/o
ALT	(Kazakhstan) A Golubev (Uzbekistan) D Istomin
4	(Austria) J Knowle (Israel) A Ram	6	7^{8}
(Cyprus) M Baghdatis (Switzerland) S Wawrinka	3	6^{6}
(United States) M Fish (The Bahamas) M Knowles	6	7
(Sweden) S Aspelin (Australia) P Hanley	4	5
(India) R Bopanna (Pakistan) A-u-H Qureshi	7^{8}	7
2	(United States) B Bryan (United States) M Bryan	6^{6}	5

Semifinals
(Czech Republic) T Berdych (Czech Republic) R Štěpánek	5	6	[10]
4	(Austria) J Knowle (Israel) A Ram	7	2	[4]
(United States) M Fish (The Bahamas) M Knowles	7	7
(India) R Bopanna (Pakistan) A-u-H Qureshi	5	5

Finals
(Czech Republic) T Berdych (Czech Republic) R Štěpánek	6	6^{7}	[7]
(United States) M Fish (The Bahamas) M Knowles	4	7^{9}	[10]
