= 2008 Legg Mason Tennis Classic – Doubles =

Doubles
- 2008 Legg Mason Tennis Classic

Final
- Champions: (France) Marc Gicquel (Sweden) Robert Lindstedt
- Runners-up: (Brazil) Bruno Soares (Zimbabwe) Kevin Ullyett
- Score: 7–6^{(8–6)}, 6–3

Details
- Draw: 16
- Seeds: 4

Events
Singles	Doubles
← 2007 ·	Washington Open	· 2009 →

Bob Bryan and Mike Bryan were the defending champions, but chose not to participate that year.

Marc Gicquel and Robert Lindstedt won in the final 7–6^{(8–6)}, 6–3, against Bruno Soares and Kevin Ullyett.

== Seeds ==
1. (Brazil) Bruno Soares / (Zimbabwe) Kevin Ullyett (final)
2. (Uruguay) Pablo Cuevas / (Peru) Luis Horna (first round)
3. (South Africa) Rik de Voest / (Australia) Ashley Fisher (quarterfinals)
4. (Netherlands) Rogier Wassen / (Croatia) Lovro Zovko (quarterfinals)

== Draw ==
=== Key ===
- Q = Qualifier
- WC = Wild card
- LL = Lucky loser
- Alt = Alternate
- SE = Special exempt
- PR = Protected ranking
- ITF = ITF entry
- JE = Junior exempt
- w/o = Walkover
- r = Retired
- d = Defaulted
- SR = Special ranking

=== Draw ===
First round
1	(Brazil) B Soares (Zimbabwe) K Ullyett	6	6
(France) S Grosjean (France) N Mahut	1	3
ALT	(Thailand) S Ratiwatana (Thailand) S Ratiwatana	4	4
(United States) E Butorac (United States) J Cerretani	6	6
4	(Netherlands) R Wassen (Croatia) L Zovko	6	6
(United States) R Ram (United States) B Reynolds	4	4
(Spain) M Granollers (Argentina) S Prieto	6^{2}	6	[10]
(United States) S Lipsky (United States) D Martin	7^{7}	3	[7]
(United States) T Parrott (Slovakia) F Polášek	7^{8}	6
WC	(United States) P Goldstein (United States) J Isner	6^{6}	3
(India) R Bopanna (Pakistan) A-u-H Qureshi	4	4
3	(South Africa) R de Voest (Australia) A Fisher	6	6
WC	(United States) J Ore (United States) D Kudla	1	1
(Argentina) L Arnold Ker (Argentina) E Schwank	6	6
(France) M Gicquel (Sweden) R Lindstedt	6	6
2	(Uruguay) P Cuevas (Peru) L Horna	4	2

Quarterfinals
1	(Brazil) B Soares (Zimbabwe) K Ullyett	6	6
(United States) E Butorac (United States) J Cerretani	1	3
4	(Netherlands) R Wassen (Croatia) L Zovko	4	4
(Spain) M Granollers (Argentina) S Prieto	6	6
(United States) T Parrott (Slovakia) F Polášek	6	6
3	(South Africa) R de Voest (Australia) A Fisher	2	2
(Argentina) L Arnold Ker (Argentina) E Schwank	2	6	[10]
(France) M Gicquel (Sweden) R Lindstedt	6	3	[12]

Semifinals
1	(Brazil) B Soares (Zimbabwe) K Ullyett	6	6
(Spain) M Granollers (Argentina) S Prieto	4	4
(United States) T Parrott (Slovakia) F Polášek	4	6	[6]
(France) M Gicquel (Sweden) R Lindstedt	6	4	[10]

Final
1	(Brazil) B Soares (Zimbabwe) K Ullyett	6^{6}	3
(France) M Gicquel (Sweden) R Lindstedt	7^{8}	6
