= 2011 Legg Mason Tennis Classic – Doubles =

Doubles
- 2011 Legg Mason Tennis Classic

Final
- Champions: (France) Michaël Llodra (Serbia) Nenad Zimonjić
- Runners-up: (Sweden) Robert Lindstedt (Romania) Horia Tecău
- Score: 6–7^{(3–7)}, 7–6^{(8–6)}, [10–7]

Details
- Draw: 16
- Seeds: 4

Events
| Singles | Doubles |
- Washington Open

Mardy Fish and Mark Knowles were the defending champions; however, Fish chose not to compete.
Mark Knowles teamed up with Xavier Malisse, but they were eliminated by Robert Lindstedt and Horia Tecău.

No. 3 seeds Michaël Llodra and Nenad Zimonjić won the tournament beating Lindstedt & Tecău in the final, 6–7^{(3–7)}, 7–6^{(8–6)}, [10–7].

== Seeds ==
1. (United States) Bob Bryan / (United States) Mike Bryan (first round)
2. (Belarus) Max Mirnyi / (Canada) Daniel Nestor (first round)
3. (France) Michaël Llodra / (Serbia) Nenad Zimonjić (champions)
4. (India) Rohan Bopanna / (Pakistan) Aisam-ul-Haq Qureshi (first round)

== Draw ==
Key

- Q = Qualifier
- WC = Wild card
- LL = Lucky loser
- Alt = Alternate
- ITF = ITF entry
- PR = Protected ranking
- SR = Special ranking
- SE = Special exempt
- JE = Junior exempt
- JR = Junior Accelerator Programme entrant
- CO = College Accelerator Programme entrant
- NG = Next Gen Accelerator Program entrant
- w/o = Walkover
- r = Retired
- d = Defaulted

=== Draw ===
First round
1 | (United States) B Bryan (United States) M Bryan | 6^{1} | 3
(Brazil) M Melo (Brazil) B Soares | 7^{7} | 6
(Austria) O Marach (Austria) J Melzer | 7^{7} | 3 | [12]
WC | (Israel) J Erlich (Israel) A Ram | 6^{5} | 6 | [14]
3 | (France) M Llodra (Serbia) N Zimonjić | 6^{5} | 7 | [10]
(South Africa) K Anderson (Australia) P Hanley | 7^{7} | 5 | [8]
WC | (United States) J Blake (United States) J Isner
(Poland) M Fyrstenberg (Poland) M Matkowski | w/o
(Sweden) R Lindstedt (Romania) H Tecău | 7 | 6
(Serbia) J Tipsarević (Serbia) V Troicki | 5 | 4
(The Bahamas) M Knowles (Belgium) X Malisse | 7^{7} | 6^{6} | [10]
4 | (India) R Bopanna (Pakistan) A-u-H Qureshi | 6^{1} | 7^{8} | [3]
(United States) S Lipsky (United States) R Ram | 6^{5} | 6^{3}
(United States) E Butorac (Curaçao) J-J Rojer | 7^{7} | 7^{7}
(Germany) T Haas (Czech Republic) R Štěpánek | 6 | 5 | [10]
2 | (Belarus) M Mirnyi (Canada) D Nestor | 2 | 7 | [2]

Quarterfinals
(Brazil) M Melo (Brazil) B Soares | 6 | 6
WC | (Israel) J Erlich (Israel) A Ram | 3 | 3
3 | (France) M Llodra (Serbia) N Zimonjić | 7 | 7^{7}
(Poland) M Fyrstenberg (Poland) M Matkowski | 5 | 6^{1}
(Sweden) R Lindstedt (Romania) H Tecău | 6 | 6
(The Bahamas) M Knowles (Belgium) X Malisse | 4 | 4
(United States) E Butorac (Curaçao) J-J Rojer | 4 | 6 | [2]
(Germany) T Haas (Czech Republic) R Štěpánek | 6 | 1 | [10]

Semifinals
(Brazil) M Melo (Brazil) B Soares | 7^{8} | 6^{7} | [8]
3 | (France) M Llodra (Serbia) N Zimonjić | 6^{6} | 7^{9} | [10]
(Sweden) R Lindstedt (Romania) H Tecău | w/o
(Germany) T Haas (Czech Republic) R Štěpánek

Finals
3 | (France) M Llodra (Serbia) N Zimonjić | 6^{3} | 7^{8} | [10]
(Sweden) R Lindstedt (Romania) H Tecău | 7^{7} | 6^{6} | [7]
