= 2010 Legg Mason Tennis Classic – Singles =

Singles
- 2010 Legg Mason Tennis Classic

Final
- Champion: (Argentina) David Nalbandian
- Runner-up: (Cyprus) Marcos Baghdatis
- Score: 6–2, 7–6^{(7–4)}

Details
- Draw: 48 (6Q / 4WC)
- Seeds: 16

Events
Singles	Doubles
← 2009 ·	Washington Open	· 2011 →

Juan Martín del Potro was the defending champion, but didn't participate due to a wrist injury.
David Nalbandian, ranked 117th, defeated Marcos Baghdatis 6–2, 7–6^{(7–4)} in the final.

== Seeds ==
All seeds received a bye into the second round.

1. (Czech Republic) Tomáš Berdych (quarterfinals)
2. (United States) Andy Roddick (third round)
3. (Spain) Fernando Verdasco (quarterfinals)
4. (Croatia) Marin Čilić (semifinals)
5. (United States) John Isner (third round)
6. (United States) Sam Querrey (second round)
7. (Switzerland) Stanislas Wawrinka (second round)
8. (Cyprus) Marcos Baghdatis (final)
9. (Latvia) Ernests Gulbis (second round, retired due to back injury)
10. (Czech Republic) Radek Štěpánek (second round)
11. (Australia) Lleyton Hewitt (second round, retired due to right calf injury)
12. (France) Julien Benneteau (second round)
13. (France) Gilles Simon (quarterfinals)
14. (France) Michaël Llodra (second round)
15. (United States) Mardy Fish (third round)
16. (Kazakhstan) Andrey Golubev (third round)

== Draw ==
=== Key ===
- Q = Qualifier
- WC = Wild card
- LL = Lucky loser
- Alt = Alternate
- ITF = ITF entry
- PR = Protected ranking
- SR = Special ranking
- SE = Special exempt
- JE = Junior exempt
- JR = Junior Accelerator Programme entrant
- CO = College Accelerator Programme entrant
- NG = Next Gen Accelerator Program entrant
- w/o = Walkover
- r = Retired
- d = Defaulted

=== Finals ===
Quarterfinals
1	(Czech Republic) Tomáš Berdych	4	6	2
(Belgium) Xavier Malisse	6	3	6
3/WC	(Spain) Fernando Verdasco	6^{3}	4
8	(Cyprus) Marcos Baghdatis	7^{7}	6
(Serbia) Janko Tipsarević	6^{4}	4
4	(Croatia) Marin Čilić	7^{7}	6
WC	(Argentina) David Nalbandian	3	6	6
13	(France) Gilles Simon	6	2	3

Semifinals
(Belgium) Xavier Malisse	2	6^{4}
8	(Cyprus) Marcos Baghdatis	6	7^{7}
4	(Croatia) Marin Čilić	2	2
WC	(Argentina) David Nalbandian	6	6

Final
8	(Cyprus) Marcos Baghdatis	2	6^{4}
WC	(Argentina) David Nalbandian	6	7^{7}

=== Top half ===
==== Section 1 ====
First round
PR	(Russia) D Tursunov	5	7	6
(Russia) T Gabashvili	7	5	4
WC	(France) R Gasquet	3	r
PR	(Belgium) K Vliegen	6
(Colombia) S Giraldo	6	3	4
(Belgium) X Malisse	4	6	6
(Slovakia) L Lacko	7	3	3
(Netherlands) T de Bakker	5	6	6

Second round
1	(Czech Republic) T Berdych	7^{7}	4	6
PR	(Russia) D Tursunov	6^{2}	6	1
PR	(Belgium) K Vliegen	2	6^{7}
16	(Kazakhstan) A Golubev	6	7^{9}
12	(France) J Benneteau	5	4
(Belgium) X Malisse	7	6
(Netherlands) T de Bakker	6^{6}	6^{8}
5	(United States) J Isner	7^{8}	7^{10}

Third round
1	(Czech Republic) T Berdych	6	5	7
16	(Kazakhstan) A Golubev	3	7	5
(Belgium) X Malisse	6	3	7^{7}
5	(United States) J Isner	4	6	6^{5}

Quarterfinals
1	(Czech Republic) T Berdych	4	6	2
(Belgium) X Malisse	6	3	6

==== Section 2 ====
First round
(Slovakia) K Beck	3	4
(Germany) M Berrer	6	6
Q	(United States) R Sweeting	3	6	6
WC	(United States) J Blake	6	3	4
(Ukraine) I Marchenko	6	3	6
(Germany) R Schüttler	4	6	4
(Poland) M Przysiężny	6	6^{5}	4
(Argentina) H Zeballos	3	7^{7}	6

Second round
3/WC	(Spain) F Verdasco	4	7	7^{8}
(Germany) M Berrer	6	5	6^{6}
Q	(United States) R Sweeting	6	6
14	(France) M Llodra	4	2
9	(Latvia) E Gulbis	1	0^{r}
(Ukraine) I Marchenko	6	1
(Argentina) H Zeballos	6^{3}	6^{5}
8	(Cyprus) M Baghdatis	7^{7}	7^{7}

Third round
3/WC	(Spain) F Verdasco	6	7
Q	(United States) R Sweeting	4	5
(Ukraine) I Marchenko	3	7^{7}	3
8	(Cyprus) M Baghdatis	6	6^{5}	6

Quarterfinals
3/WC	(Spain) F Verdasco	6^{3}	4
8	(Cyprus) M Baghdatis	7^{7}	6

=== Bottom half ===
==== Section 3 ====
First round
(France) A Clément	4	0
(Serbia) J Tipsarević	6	6
(Chinese Taipei) Y-h Lu	5	1
(Colombia) A Falla	7	6
(Serbia) V Troicki	6	6
Q	(United States) K Kim	1	2
(Uzbekistan) D Istomin	6	5	7^{7}
(Argentina) L Mayer	4	7	6^{5}

Second round
6	(United States) S Querrey	6^{3}	3
(Serbia) J Tipsarević	7^{7}	6
(Colombia) A Falla	7	3
11	(Australia) L Hewitt	5	2^{r}
15	(United States) M Fish	6	6
(Serbia) V Troicki	4	3
(Uzbekistan) D Istomin	4	2
4	(Croatia) M Čilić	6	6

Third round
(Serbia) J Tipsarević	6	6
(Colombia) A Falla	3	4
15	(United States) M Fish	4	6	2
4	(Croatia) M Čilić	6	4	6

Quarterfinals
(Serbia) J Tipsarević	6^{4}	4
4	(Croatia) M Čilić	7^{7}	6

==== Section 4 ====
First round
WC	(Argentina) D Nalbandian	6	6
(United States) R Ram	4	0
Q	(Argentina) B Dabul	6^{3}	2
(Switzerland) M Chiudinelli	7^{7}	6
Q	(Russia) I Kunitsyn	6	6
Q	(Japan) K Nishikori	2	3
(Germany) B Becker	2	3
Q	(Slovenia) G Žemlja	6	6

Second round
7	(Switzerland) S Wawrinka	1	3
WC	(Argentina) D Nalbandian	6	6
(Switzerland) M Chiudinelli	6	6
10	(Czech Republic) R Štěpánek	1	3
13	(France) G Simon	6	6
Q	(Russia) I Kunitsyn	1	2
Q	(Slovenia) G Žemlja	4	4
2	(United States) A Roddick	6	6

Third round
WC	(Argentina) D Nalbandian	6	6
(Switzerland) M Chiudinelli	1	0
13	(France) G Simon	6	6
2	(United States) A Roddick	3	3

Quarterfinals
WC	(Argentina) D Nalbandian	3	6	6
13	(France) G Simon	6	2	3

== Qualifying ==
=== Seeds ===
1. (South Africa) Kevin Anderson (qualifying competition)
2. (United States) Michael Russell (qualifying competition)
3. (Argentina) Brian Dabul (qualified)
4. (United States) Donald Young (qualifying competition)
5. (India) Somdev Devvarman (qualifying competition)
6. (United States) Ryan Sweeting (qualified)
7. (Russia) Igor Kunitsyn (qualified)
8. (Slovenia) Grega Žemlja (qualified)
9. (Colombia) Carlos Salamanca (first round)
10. (United States) Kevin Kim (qualified)
11. (Netherlands) Igor Sijsling (qualifying competition)
12. (Japan) Kei Nishikori (qualified)

=== Qualifiers ===
1. (Japan) Kei Nishikori
2. (Russia) Igor Kunitsyn
3. (Argentina) Brian Dabul
4. (Slovenia) Grega Žemlja
5. (United States) Kevin Kim
6. (United States) Ryan Sweeting

=== Draw ===
==== First qualifier ====
First round
1	(South Africa) Kevin Anderson	7^{12}	6
(Slovakia) Ivo Klec	6^{10}	4
WC	(United States) Junior Alexander Ore	3	1
12	(Japan) Kei Nishikori	6	6

Qualifying competition
1	(South Africa) Kevin Anderson	6	6^{4}	4
12	(Japan) Kei Nishikori	4	7^{7}	6

==== Second qualifier ====
First round
2	(United States) Michael Russell	6	6
Alt	(United Kingdom) Richard Bloomfield	2	1
(Monaco) Benjamin Balleret	0	6^{5}
7	(Russia) Igor Kunitsyn	6	7^{7}

Qualifying competition
2	(United States) Michael Russell	3	4
7	(Russia) Igor Kunitsyn	6	6

==== Third qualifier ====
First round
3	(Argentina) Brian Dabul	5	6	6
WC	(United States) Devin Britton	7	2	2
(Australia) John Millman	1	6^{7}
11	(Netherlands) Igor Sijsling	6	7^{9}

Qualifying competition
3	(Argentina) Brian Dabul	6	6
11	(Netherlands) Igor Sijsling	0	0

==== Fourth qualifier ====
First round
4	(United States) Donald Young	6	6
WC	(United States) Michael Shabaz	4	2
(Romania) Marius Copil	4	6^{4}
8	(Slovenia) Grega Žemlja	6	7^{7}

Qualifying competition
4	(United States) Donald Young	2	4
8	(Slovenia) Grega Žemlja	6	6

==== Fifth qualifier ====
First round
5	(India) Somdev Devvarman	6	6
WC	(United States) Denis Kudla	1	1
(Israel) Noam Okun	2	2
10	(United States) Kevin Kim	6	6

Qualifying competition
5	(India) Somdev Devvarman	6	4	1
10	(United States) Kevin Kim	3	6	6

==== Sixth qualifier ====
First round
6	(United States) Ryan Sweeting	7	6
(Russia) Alex Bogomolov Jr.	5	2
(Australia) Greg Jones	6	6
9	(Colombia) Carlos Salamanca	3	4

Qualifying competition
6	(United States) Ryan Sweeting	6	6
(Australia) Greg Jones	4	4
