= 2008 Legg Mason Tennis Classic – Singles =

Singles
- 2008 Legg Mason Tennis Classic

Final
- Champion: (Argentina) Juan Martín del Potro
- Runner-up: (Serbia) Viktor Troicki
- Score: 6–3, 6–3

Details
- Draw: 32 (4Q / 3WC)
- Seeds: 8

Events
Singles	Doubles
- Washington Open

Andy Roddick was the defending champion, but lost in the quarterfinals to Viktor Troicki.

Juan Martín del Potro won in the final 6–3, 6–3, against Viktor Troicki.

== Seeds ==
1. (United States) Andy Roddick (quarterfinals)
2. (Argentina) Juan Martín del Potro (champion)
3. (Spain) Feliciano López (first round)
4. (Germany) Tommy Haas (semifinals)
5. (United States) Mardy Fish (first round)
6. (Russia) Marat Safin (first round, retired due to a neck pain)
7. (France) Marc Gicquel (first round)
8. (Spain) Marcel Granollers (first round)

== Draw ==
Key

- Q = Qualifier
- WC = Wild card
- LL = Lucky loser
- Alt = Alternate
- ITF = ITF entry
- PR = Protected ranking
- SR = Special ranking
- SE = Special exempt
- JE = Junior exempt
- JR = Junior Accelerator Programme entrant
- CO = College Accelerator Programme entrant
- NG = Next Gen Accelerator Program entrant
- w/o = Walkover
- r = Retired
- d = Defaulted

=== Finals ===
Semifinals
(Serbia) Viktor Troicki	6	6
(Russia) Igor Kunitsyn	4	2
4	(Germany) Tommy Haas	2	1
2	(Argentina) Juan Martín del Potro	6	6

Final
(Serbia) Viktor Troicki	3	3
2	(Argentina) Juan Martín del Potro	6	6

=== Top half ===
First round
1	(United States) A Roddick	6	7^{7}
Q	(Paraguay) R Delgado	3	6^{4}
(France) S Grosjean	3	6	3
(Argentina) E Schwank	6	4	6
(Serbia) V Troicki	6	6
(Germany) D Gremelmayr	4	2
(United States) B Reynolds	7^{7}	3	6
7	(France) M Gicquel	6^{2}	6	4
3	(Spain) F López	3	5
Q	(United States) R Kendrick	6	7
WC	(United States) T Dent	6^{3}	6	1
Q	(India) S Devvarman	7^{7}	2	6
(Russia) I Kunitsyn	6^{8}	6	6
(Germany) M Zverev	7^{10}	4	2
(Italy) F Fognini	7
6	(Russia) M Safin	5	r

Second round
1	(United States) A Roddick	4	6	7^{7}
(Argentina) E Schwank	6	4	6^{2}
(Serbia) V Troicki	6	1	6
(United States) B Reynolds	4	6	4
Q	(United States) R Kendrick	2	7^{7}	5
Q	(India) S Devvarman	6	6^{5}	7
(Russia) I Kunitsyn	2	6	7^{8}
(Italy) F Fognini	6	2	6^{6}

Quarterfinals
1	(United States) A Roddick	6	2	4
(Serbia) V Troicki	0	6	6
Q	(India) S Devvarman	4	1
(Russia) I Kunitsyn	6	6

Semifinals
(Serbia) V Troicki	6	6
(Russia) I Kunitsyn	4	2

=== Bottom half ===
First round
5	(United States) M Fish	7	4	2
(Colombia) A Falla	5	6	6
(France) F Serra	7^{7}	6
WC	(Belarus) U Ignatik	6^{3}	3
(United States) W Odesnik	6	4	4
(France) N Mahut	4	6	6
Q	(South Africa) R de Voest	4	6	1
4	(Germany) T Haas	6	4	6
8	(Spain) M Granollers	3	7^{7}	6^{1}
(United States) J Isner	6	6^{5}	7^{7}
(United States) D Young	6	6
(Peru) L Horna	3	1
(Israel) D Sela	7^{8}	6
(United States) V Spadea	6^{6}	3
WC	(United States) J Levine	2	3
2	(Argentina) JM del Potro	6	6

Second round
(Colombia) A Falla	7^{7}	7^{13}
(France) F Serra	6^{2}	6^{11}
(France) N Mahut	6^{4}	3
4	(Germany) T Haas	7^{7}	6
(United States) J Isner	6	7^{7}
(United States) D Young	4	6^{4}
(Israel) D Sela	0	7	2
2	(Argentina) JM del Potro	6	5	6

Quarterfinals
(Colombia) A Falla	5	1
4	(Germany) T Haas	7	6
(United States) J Isner	4	4
2	(Argentina) JM del Potro	6	6

Semifinals
4	(Germany) T Haas	2	1
2	(Argentina) JM del Potro	6	6
