= 2011 Legg Mason Tennis Classic =

- Date: July 30 – August 7
- Edition: 43rd
- Category: ATP World Tour 500
- Draw: 48S / 16D
- Prize money: $1,166,400
- Surface: Hard / outdoor
- Location: Washington, D.C., US
- Venue: William H.G. FitzGerald Tennis Center

Champions

Singles
- (Czech Republic) Radek Štěpánek

Doubles
- (France) Michaël Llodra / (Serbia) Nenad Zimonjić
- Washington Open

The 2011 Legg Mason Tennis Classic was a men's tennis tournament played on outdoor hard courts. It was the 43rd edition of this event and was part of the ATP World Tour 500 series of the 2011 ATP World Tour. It took place at the William H.G. FitzGerald Tennis Center in Washington, D.C. in the United States from July 30 through August 7, 2011. Unseeded Radek Štěpánek won the singles title.

== Finals ==
=== Singles ===
(Czech Republic) Radek Štěpánek defeated (France) Gaël Monfils, 6–4, 6–4

- It was Stepanek's 1st title of the year and 5th of his career.

=== Doubles ===
(France) Michaël Llodra / (Serbia) Nenad Zimonjić defeated (Sweden) Robert Lindstedt / (Romania) Horia Tecău, 6–7^{(3–7)}, 7–6^{(8–6)}, [10–7]

== Entrants ==
=== Seeds ===
Country	Player	Rank	Seed
FRA	Gaël Monfils	7	1
USA	Mardy Fish	9	2
SRB	Viktor Troicki	15	3
AUT	Jürgen Melzer	18	4
ESP	Fernando Verdasco	20	5
SRB	Janko Tipsarević	23	6
CYP	Marcos Baghdatis	25	7
ARG	David Nalbandian	28	8
RUS	Nikolay Davydenko	29	9
FRA	Michaël Llodra	30	10
USA	John Isner	33	11
BRA	Thomaz Bellucci	34	12
RSA	Kevin Anderson	35	13
BEL	Xavier Malisse	41	14
RUS	Dmitry Tursunov	46	15
FIN	Jarkko Nieminen	53	16

- Seedings are based on rankings as of July 25, 2011.

=== Other entrants ===
The following players received wildcards into the singles main draw

- (United States) Ryan Harrison
- (United States) Denis Kudla
- (France) Gaël Monfils
- (Spain) Fernando Verdasco

The following players received entry from the qualifying draw:

- (Australia) Matthew Ebden
- (Australia) Chris Guccione
- (Australia) Marinko Matosevic
- (United States) Rajeev Ram
- (New Zealand) Artem Sitak
- (United States) Tim Smyczek

The following players received entry as lucky losers into the singles main draw:

- (Bosnia and Herzegovina) Amer Delić
- (United States) Wayne Odesnik
