= 2008 Legg Mason Tennis Classic =

- Date: August 9–17
- Edition: 40th
- Category: International Series
- Draw: 32S / 16D
- Prize money: $483,000
- Surface: Hard / outdoor
- Location: Washington, D.C., US
- Venue: William H.G. FitzGerald Tennis Center

Champions

Singles
- (Argentina) Juan Martín del Potro

Doubles
- (France) Marc Gicquel / (Sweden) Robert Lindstedt
- Washington Open

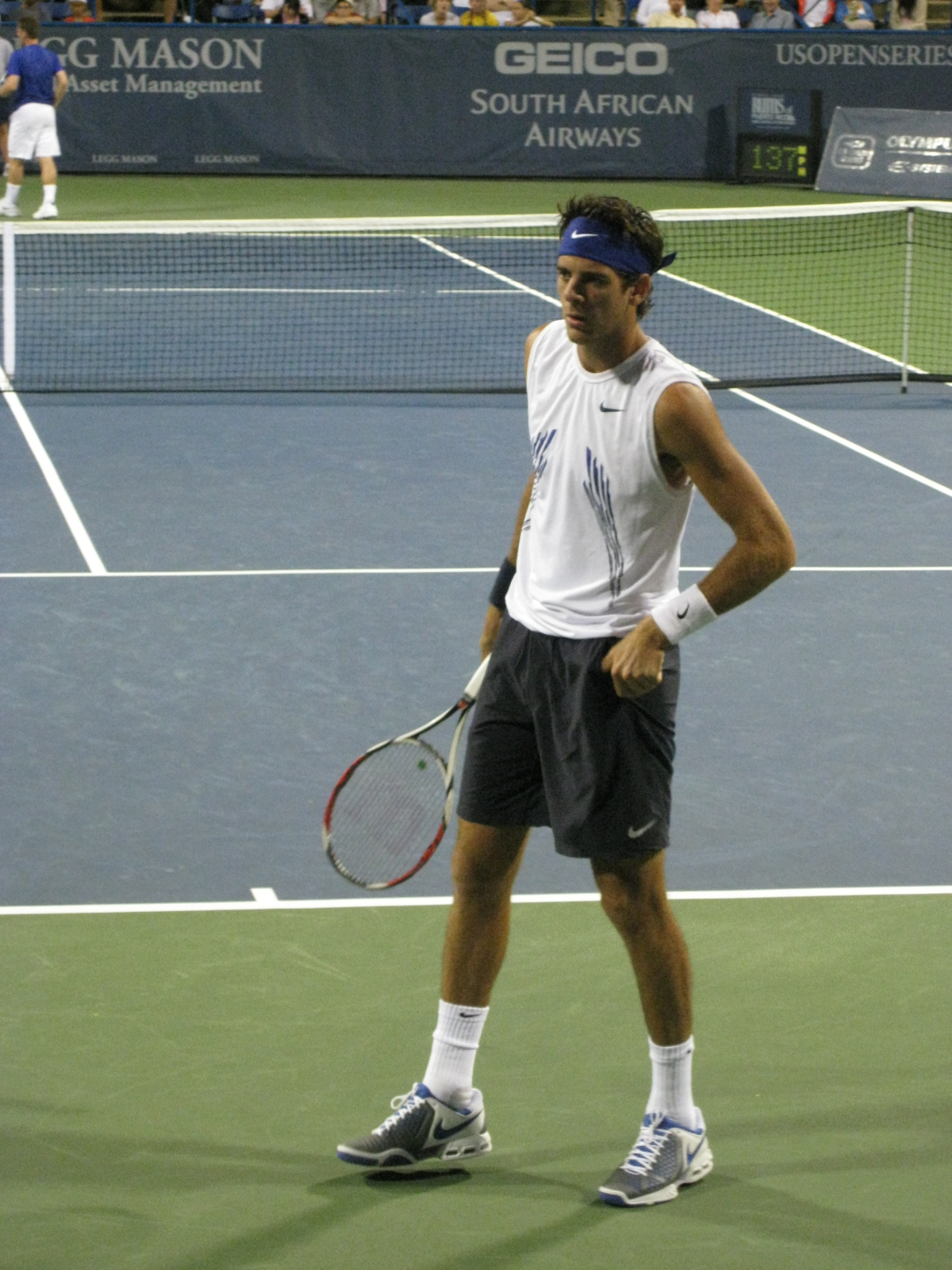
Men's singles champion Juan Martín del Potro

The 2008 Legg Mason Tennis Classic was a men's tennis tournament played on outdoor hard courts. It was the 40th edition of the Legg Mason Tennis Classic, and was part of the International Series of the 2008 ATP Tour. It took place at the William H.G. FitzGerald Tennis Center in Washington, D.C., United States, from August 9 through August 17, 2008.

The singles were led by ATP No. 9, San Jose and Dubai titlist, Los Angeles finalist, and defending champion Andy Roddick, winner of back-to-back titles in Stuttgart, Kitzbühel and Los Angeles Juan Martín del Potro, and Dubai finalist and Wimbledon quarterfinalist Feliciano López. Other seeds were Indian Wells quarterfinalist Tommy Haas, Indian Wells runner-up and Los Angeles semifinalist Mardy Fish, Marat Safin, Marc Gicquel and Marcel Granollers.

== Finals ==
=== Singles ===
(Argentina) Juan Martín del Potro defeated (Serbia) Viktor Troicki, 6–3, 6–3

- It was Juan Martín del Potro's 4th title of the year, and overall.

=== Doubles ===
(France) Marc Gicquel / (Sweden) Robert Lindstedt defeated (Brazil) Bruno Soares / (Zimbabwe) Kevin Ullyett, 7–6^{(8–6)}, 6–3
