= John Isner =

American tennis player (born 1985)

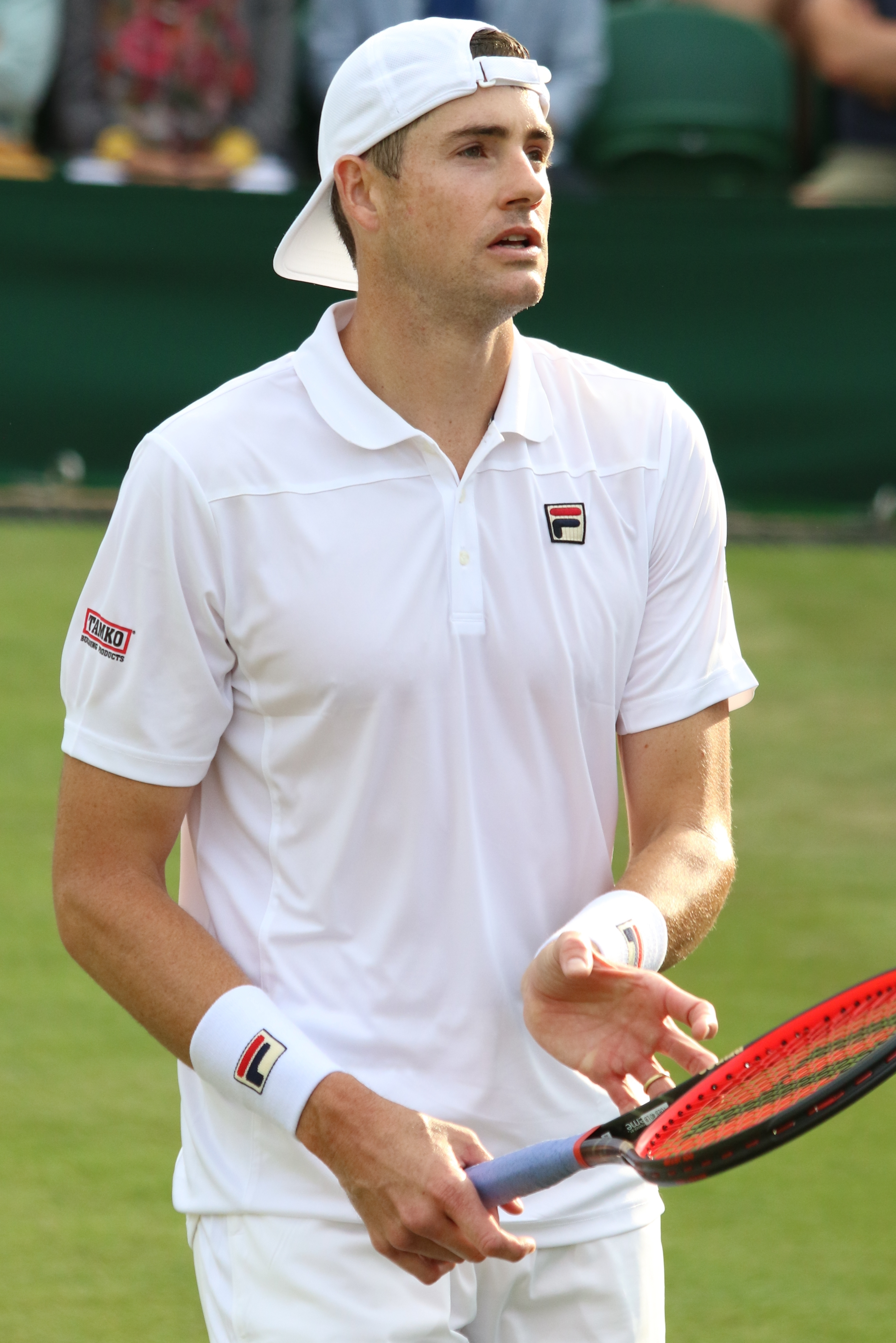
- Isner at the 2019 Wimbledon Championships.
- Full name: John Robert Isner
- Country (sports): United States
- Residence: Dallas, Texas, US
- Born: April 26, 1985 (age 41) Greensboro, North Carolina, US
- Height: 6 ft 10 in (2.08 m)
- Turned pro: 2007
- Retired: 2023
- Plays: Right-handed (two-handed backhand)
- College: University of Georgia
- Prize money: US $22,433,361: 29th all-time leader in earnings
- Official website: www.johnisner.com

Singles
- Career record: 489–317 (60.7%) (Note: in ATP Tour and Grand Slam main draw matches, and in Davis Cup)
- Career titles: 16
- Highest ranking: No. 8 (July 16, 2018)

Grand Slam singles results
- Australian Open: 4R (2010, 2016)
- French Open: 4R (2014, 2016, 2018)
- Wimbledon: SF (2018)
- US Open: QF (2011, 2018)

Other tournaments
- Tour Finals: RR (2018)
- Olympic Games: QF (2012)

Doubles
- Career record: 150–114 (56.8%)
- Career titles: 8
- Highest ranking: No. 14 (July 18, 2022)

Grand Slam doubles results
- Australian Open: QF (2009)
- French Open: 3R (2008)
- Wimbledon: 1R (2023)
- US Open: 2R (2009)

Team competitions
- Davis Cup: SF (2012, 2018)
- Hopman Cup: W (2011)

John Robert Isner (born April 26, 1985) is an American former professional tennis player. He was ranked as high as world No. 8 in singles and No. 14 in doubles by the Association of Tennis Professionals (ATP). Considered one of the best servers ever to play on the ATP Tour, Isner achieved his career-high singles ranking in July 2018 by virtue of his first Masters 1000 crown at the 2018 Miami Open and a semifinal appearance at the 2018 Wimbledon Championships. At the 2010 Wimbledon Championships, Isner played the longest professional tennis match in history, requiring five sets and 183 games to defeat Nicolas Mahut in a match which lasted 11 hours and 5 minutes, and was played over the course of three days. Isner holds the record for hitting the ATP's fastest official serve ever and third-fastest on record in tennis at 157.3 mph or 253 km/h during his first-round 2016 Davis Cup match. He has the most aces in the history of the ATP Tour, having served 14,470, as of August 31, 2023. Isner retired from professional tennis following the 2023 US Open.

== Early life ==
Isner was born on April 26, 1985, in Greensboro, North Carolina, to Robert and Karen Isner. He has two older brothers, Jordan and Nathan.

Isner started playing tennis at the age of 9 and did not take the sport seriously until the age of 11. He played for his high school of Walter Hines Page Senior High School where he helped lead them to a state championship in 2001. He also played in 10 junior tournaments which included the 2002 US Open (losing in the second round to eventual champion Richard Gasquet) and the 2002 Orange Bowl. He also made the finals of a tournament in Tulsa, Oklahoma, losing to Brian Baker.

== College career ==
Coming out of high school in 2003 as a heavily sought-after prospect, Isner was recruited by the University of Georgia Bulldogs, majoring in speech communication. He was dominant in college, compiling a win-loss record of 143–28 in singles and 140–27 in doubles. He was ranked the top tennis player in the country on a number of occasions and won multiple tournaments. Some highlights from his college career include winning the 2005 NCAA doubles title partnering with Antonio Ruiz-Rosales, winning the 2007 team event against Illinois and reaching the 2007 NCAA singles finals where he lost to Somdev Devvarman of Virginia in three sets. He ended his college career after his singles final loss and team win in 2007 and turned professional.

== Professional career ==
=== 2007–2008: Turning pro, First ATP final, top 100 ===
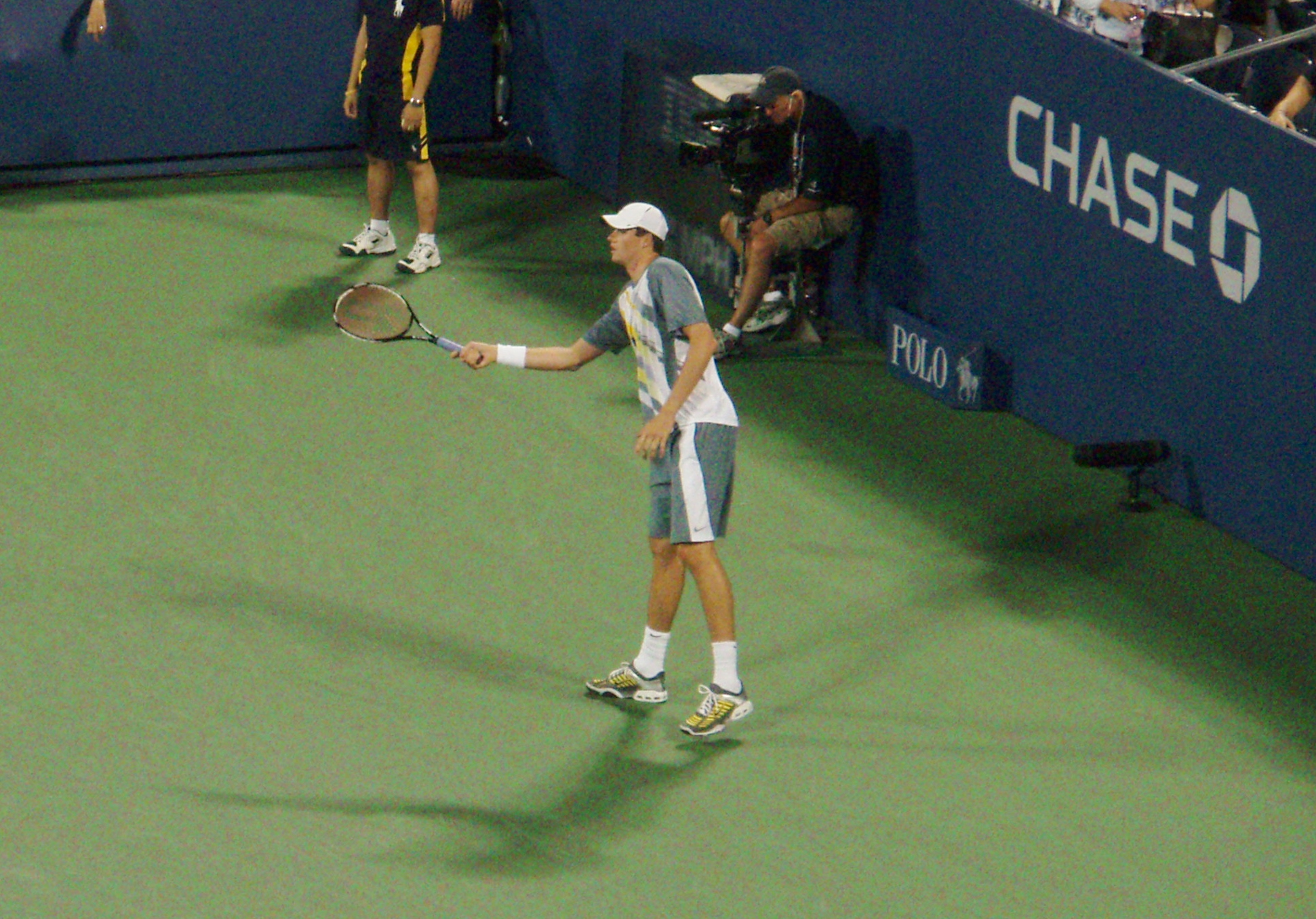
Isner at the 2007 US Open

Isner began his professional career in earnest in the summer of 2007. With a world ranking of no. 839, he needed a wildcard entry into the main draws of every single tournament, even at Futures level.

He won his first tournament of the summer, the USA F14 Futures, beating the top three seeds along the way. Then, after first-round losses at Challenger level as well as a tournament at ATP level, he beat five top-300 players and three seeds to win the Lexington Challenger in July and improve his ranking to no. 416 after just one month.

At the following week's tournament at the Legg Mason Tennis Classic in Washington, D.C., a late withdrawal freed up a wildcard spot, which was given to Isner at the last minute. Isner took full advantage of his good fortune, recording his first wins over top-100 players. He won third-set tiebreakers on five consecutive days, beating no. 73 Tim Henman, no. 47 Benjamin Becker, no. 189 qualifier Wayne Odesnik, no. 12 Tommy Haas, and no. 54 Gaël Monfils, to reach the final, where he fell to fellow American Andy Roddick. His week raised his ranking to no. 193 in the world after six weeks on the pro tour.

Isner's success in Washington, D.C. earned him wildcard entries into three more ATP tournaments—the Masters 1000 Series event in Cincinnati a week later, New Haven and the US Open. He lost in the first round in Cincinnati to quarterfinalist no. 15 David Ferrer. The following week in New Haven, he beat no. 49 Becker a second time, before falling to Ferrer for the second week in a row.

In his US Open début, he defeated the 26th-seeded player, former quarterfinalist Jarkko Nieminen, firing 34 aces along the way. He proceeded to win his second-round match against Rik de Voest, before losing in the third round to top seed and eventual champion Roger Federer. Isner was one of only two players to take a set from Federer in the championship. His US Open performance improved his ranking to no. 144.

After the US Open, Isner continued to play exclusively in North America and finished the year ranked no. 107. That year, Isner was added to the United States Davis Cup team as a practice partner.

Isner's no. 106 ranking in November 2007 was just good enough to get him direct entry into his first Australian Open after several players ranked above him dropped out. He was defeated in the first round of the 2008 Australian Open by veteran Fabrice Santoro of France. Teamed with Croat Ivo Karlović, who stands half an inch taller (Karlović is currently the joint tallest player on the ATP World Tour alongside Reilly Opelka), Isner also lost in the first round of doubles.

Isner broke into the top 100 at no. 93 in February with a quarterfinal appearance at an ATP event in San Jose, beating no. 90 Florent Serra and no. 26 Tommy Haas. He maintained a top-100 ranking in the first three months of the year, beating six players in the top 100, while playing exclusively in events at ATP level. Isner played at his first French Open and Wimbledon, losing in the first round of each. He also played at the US Open, where he lost in the first round. He ended the year ranked no. 144 in the world.

=== 2009: Top 40, first top-10 wins ===
Isner qualified for the singles draw of the 2009 Heineken Open in Auckland, after winning three consecutive three-set matches in qualifying. His final match saw him bounce back from a 0–3 deficit in the third set to eventually beat Brazilian Thomaz Bellucci in a tiebreaker. In the main draw, Isner beat Albert Montañés and countryman Robby Ginepri, before ultimately exiting with a loss in the quarterfinals.

Isner received a wildcard into the 2009 Australian Open, after winning the United States Tennis Association's wildcard tournament, beating Donald Young and Jesse Levine along the way. Despite serving 39 aces against his first-round opponent, Slovakia's Dominik Hrbatý, he lost in four sets. Isner began working with a new coach, Craig Boynton, who had coached former world no. 1 Jim Courier in the 1990s, in March 2009.

At the 2009 Indian Wells Masters, Isner pulled off a major upset by defeating ninth seed Gaël Monfils. This was Isner's first win over a top-10 player, after four previous defeats. He then went on to defeat former world no. 1 Marat Safin, before losing to world no. 6 Juan Martín del Potro in the fourth round.

In April 2009 at the U.S. Men's Clay Court Championships in Houston, Texas, at River Oaks Country Club, Isner made it as far as the quarterfinals, where he was defeated by fellow American Wayne Odesnik. Isner qualified for the French Open, but had to withdraw after being diagnosed with mononucleosis, which caused him to miss Wimbledon as well.

In August 2009, he defeated world no. 7 Jo-Wilfried Tsonga and world no. 18 Tomáš Berdych en route to the semifinals of the ATP World Tour 500 event in Washington, before losing to world no. 5 Andy Roddick. This performance brought him to a career-high ranking of no. 55 and a special exemption into the Masters 1000 Series event in Montreal, where he defeated Jesse Levine, before losing to Mikhail Youzhny. He earned a wildcard into the Masters 1000 Series event in Cincinnati, where he defeated world no. 21 Tommy Haas, before losing to world no. 35 Jérémy Chardy in the second round.

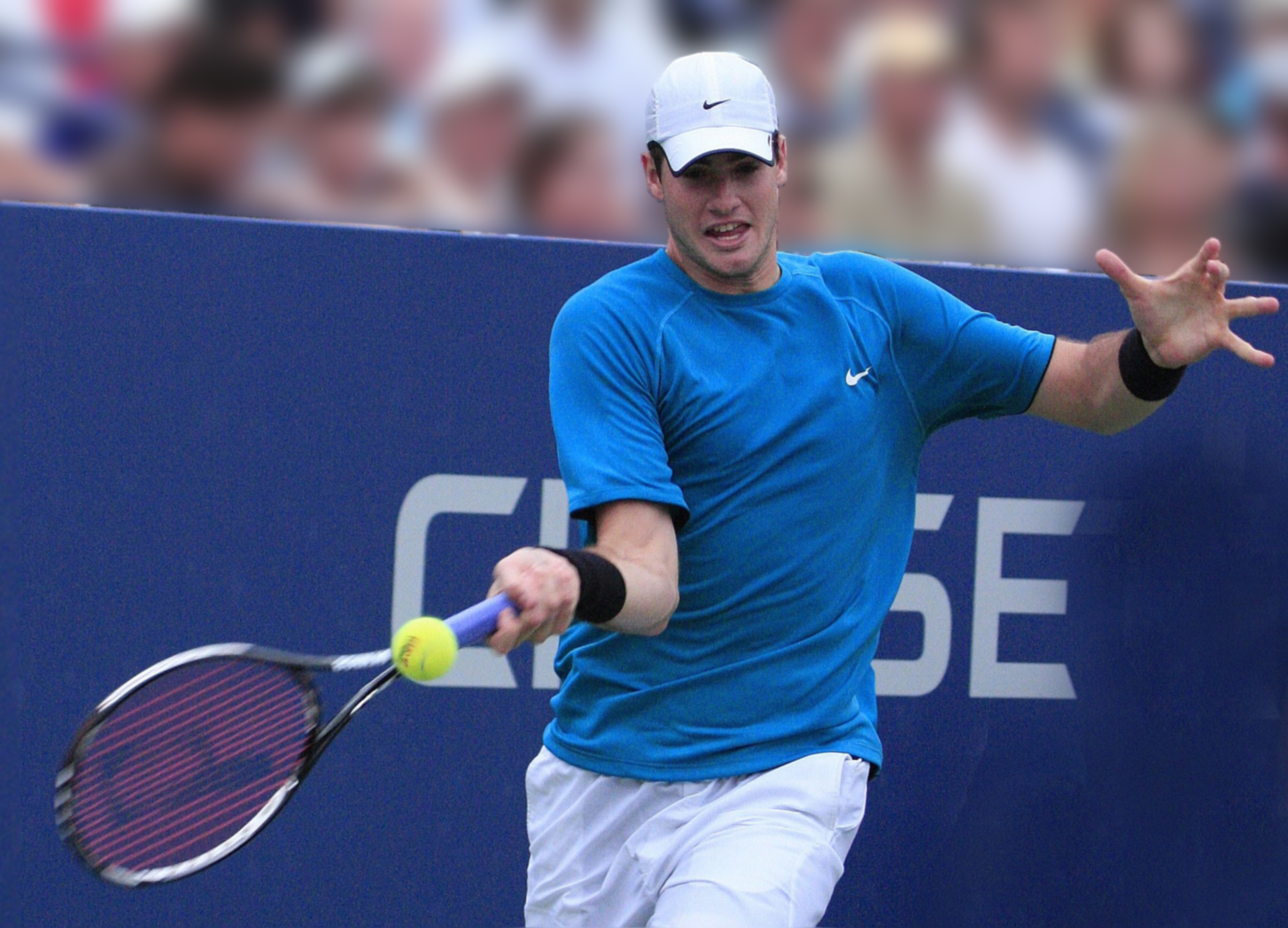
Isner's forehand return to Fernando Verdasco at the 2009 US Open

Unseeded and ranked no. 55 in the world entering the US Open, Isner defeated world no. 29 Victor Hănescu in the first round, which was his first win in a Grand Slam tournament since the 2007 US Open, ending a streak of six consecutive defeats. He then advanced to the third round, where he defeated world no. 5 and fellow American Andy Roddick in five sets for his first victory over Roddick, his first victory in a five-set match, and the first time he advanced past the third round of a Grand Slam tournament. He was then defeated in the fourth round by world no. 10 Fernando Verdasco in four sets. His US Open performance brought his ranking to a career-high no. 39.

After playing in Vienna, Basel and at the Paris Masters, Isner finished the year at a career-high no. 34 in the world. He has credited his work with Boynton for helping him get back on track following his disappointing 2008 season.

His progress was acknowledged by his peers, as he was voted the ATP Most Improved Player for 2009, becoming the tenth American to win the award, and the first since Andre Agassi in 1998.

=== 2010: First title, longest match in history ===
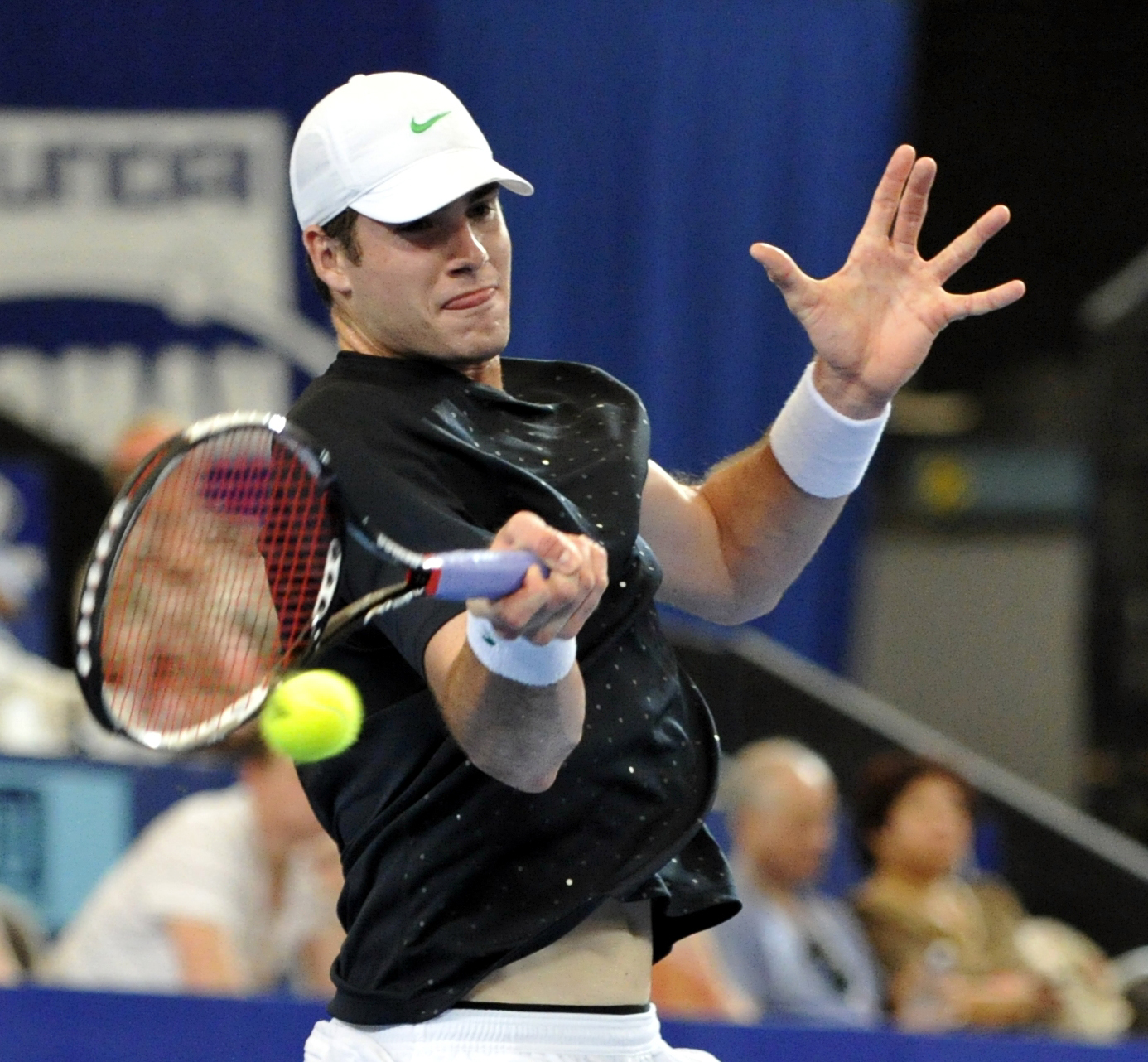
Isner hits a forehand

Isner began the year at the 2010 Heineken Open in Auckland. Unseeded, he reached his second career ATP final and first since Washington in 2007. In the final, he saved a championship point to defeat 2001 Australian Open finalist Arnaud Clément. The victory in Auckland was Isner's first ATP tour title; after the victory he donated $5,000 of his winnings to aid rescue action for the 2010 Haiti earthquake.

The victory catapulted Isner into the top 30 for the first time and also allowed him to surpass Sam Querrey to become the second-highest-ranked American for the first time, behind only Andy Roddick. Isner said he intended to finish the year in the top 20, and given his ascendency in the world rankings combined with the absence of Roddick and James Blake for the 2010 Davis Cup season, it became increasingly likely that Isner would qualify to play singles for the United States Davis Cup team for the first time in his career.

After Gilles Simon withdrew, Isner became the final seed for the 2010 Australian Open. In the first round, he defeated world no. 49 Andreas Seppi for his first victory at the Australian Open and his first victory at a Grand Slam other than the US Open. He then advanced to the round of 16, before losing to world no. 4 and eventual finalist Andy Murray.

After the Australian Open, Davis Cup captain Patrick McEnroe announced that Isner and Querrey would be first and second singles selections on the United States Davis Cup team's first-round World Group tie in Serbia on indoor clay in March 2010; Isner described the selection as "a dream come true".

Isner next entered the 2010 Regions Morgan Keegan Championships in Memphis. Seeded sixth, he made it to the finals, before losing to Sam Querrey. In the doubles event, Isner teamed up with Querrey to win the tournament, defeating the British-Australian pair of Ross Hutchins and Jordan Kerr.

Prior to the Davis Cup tie, Isner competed at the 2010 Abierto Mexicano Telcel Championships, an ATP World Tour 500 event on clay, where he was the fifth seed. He lost in the first round to Simon Greul. Despite the loss, Isner following the tournament moved into the top 20 for the first time.

Isner appeared in the first round of the 2010 Davis Cup, where the United States was up against Serbia. In his two singles matches, he faced Serbia's team of world no. 2 Novak Djokovic and world no. 35 Viktor Troicki. He lost the first singles match against Troicki, but bounced back by winning the doubles match with Bob Bryan, as a replacement for food-poisoned Mike Bryan. In his second singles match, he lost to Djokovic, which enabled Serbia to defeat the United States.

At the 2010 BNP Paribas Open in Indian Wells, he was seeded 15th and advanced to the fourth round, before losing to world no. 2 and defending champion Rafael Nadal.

Afterwards, he appeared as the 17th seed at the second Masters 1000 Series event of the season—the 2010 Sony Ericsson Open in Miami. He advanced to the third round, before losing to 12th seed Juan Carlos Ferrero.

Isner began the clay-court season with an opening-round loss to world no. 89 Xavier Malisse at the U.S. Men's Claycourt Championship, followed by a round of 32 showing at his first-ever Internazionali BNL d'Italia, where he defeated Horacio Zeballos, before losing to Thomaz Bellucci. However, he teamed with Querrey to reach the doubles final in Rome, before losing to Bob and Mike Bryan; his doubles performance raised his doubles ranking to the top 30 for the first time.

His next tournament was the 2010 Serbian Open, where he was the second seed behind defending champion, tournament host and world no. 2 Djokovic. Isner advanced to the first clay-court final of his career, third final of the year, and fourth final of his career. In the final, he lost to Querrey, despite having a match point; this was the second consecutive final Isner lost to Querrey after serving for the championship. However, Isner's finals performance improved his ranking to a career-high no. 19.

Isner's next tournament was his debut appearance at the Mutua Madrileña Madrid Open. Seeded thirteenth, he advanced to the round of 16, before losing to world no. 3 and eventual champion Nadal.

Isner then played at the 2010 French Open; his ranking assured his first direct seed into a Grand Slam event. Seeded 17th, he defeated Andrey Golubev in the first round for his first singles victory at the French Open. He advanced to the third round, before losing to the no. 15 seed and eventual semifinalist Tomáš Berdych. In doubles, he and Querrey were the 12th seeds, but withdrew prior to the start of the tournament after Querrey's first-round loss in singles.

Despite being ranked no. 19 in the world entering Wimbledon, Isner was seeded 24th by the tournament committee due to his lack of experience on grass, but was moved up to 23rd following the withdrawal of Radek Štěpánek. In the first round, Isner played Nicolas Mahut in the longest match in tennis history, prevailing 6–4, 3–6, 6–7, 7–6, 70–68. However, fatigued and having little time to recover his energy, Isner was beaten by Thiemo de Bakker in the second round, 0–6, 3–6, 2–6. This was the only match in Isner's career where he served no aces. He also pulled out of the doubles, where he and Querrey had been 12th seeds. Despite having been eliminated in the second round, Isner's total of 113 aces were more than any other player throughout the championship. His Wimbledon performance brought his ranking to a career-high no. 18 in the world.

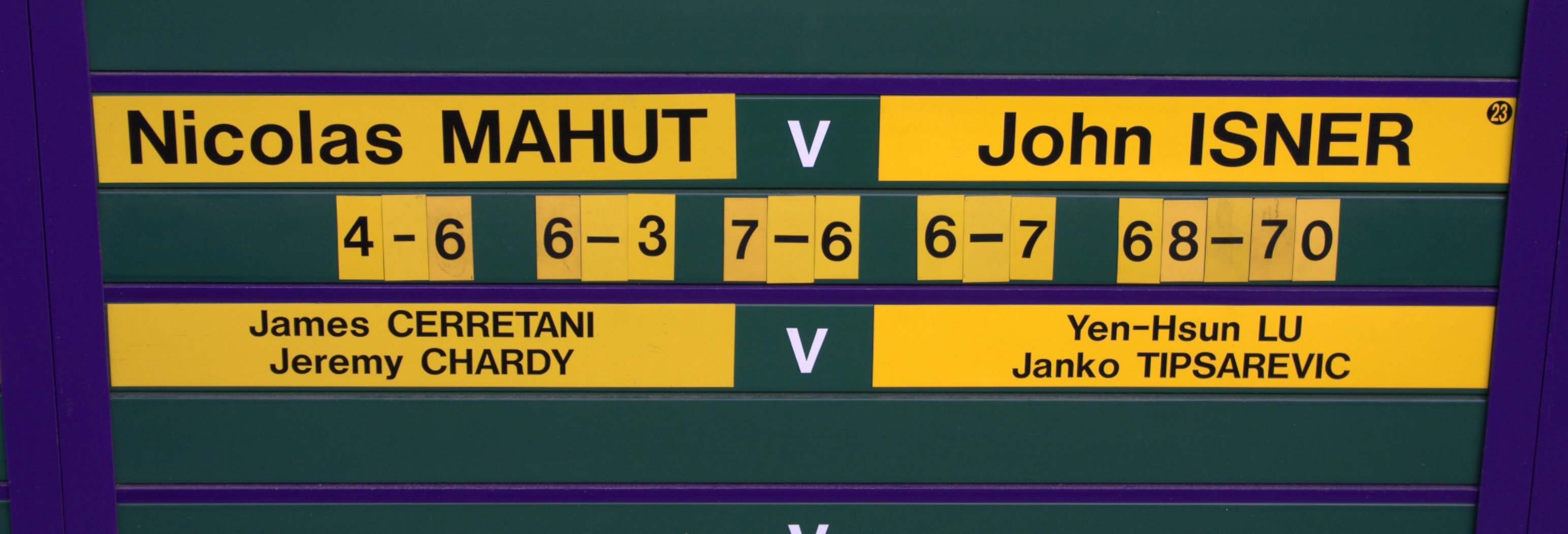
Wimbledon 2010, John Isner vs Nicolas Mahut scoreboard

Isner's next tournament was the 2010 Atlanta Tennis Championships, where he played doubles with James Blake and reached the semifinals. In singles, Isner was second seed and made it to his fourth final of the year, before losing to Mardy Fish, which dropped his career record in finals to 1–4 (0–4 against Americans).

Isner next competed at the 2010 Legg Mason Tennis Classic, the ATP World Tour 500 series event in Washington, D.C., and site of his breakthrough performance in 2007. Isner was to also compete in the doubles with Sam Querrey, but withdrew due to shoulder concerns. Seeded fifth in singles, Isner made it to the round of 16, before losing to Xavier Malisse.

Isner next played at the 2010 Cincinnati Masters, where he was unseeded. After defeating Łukasz Kubot in the first round, he faced 2002 Wimbledon finalist and 2005 Tennis Masters Cup champion David Nalbandian, but was forced to retire up a break at 5–4 in the first set after injuring his right ankle. Although Isner was found to have suffered ligament damage to the ankle, he chose not to withdraw from the US Open singles tournament.

At the 2010 US Open, Isner was 18th seed and defeated Frederico Gil in the first round. After the match he revealed that although the initial diagnosis was a right ankle ligament tear, a second opinion revealed that the damage was a strain and not a tear, and he declared his ankle 90% healed. He then advanced to the third round, before losing to 12th seed and 2006 US Open semifinalist Mikhail Youzhny. The loss dropped Isner out of the top 20 and from the no. 2 to the no. 4 ranked American player. Due to his ankle injury, he chose not to compete in doubles.

Following the US Open, Isner participated with Mardy Fish and Sam Querrey in the Davis Cup tie against Colombia, winning the doubles match with Fish as his partner. The United States won the tie 3–1 to remain in the 2011 Davis Cup World Group. Isner was next granted a wildcard to participate at the 2010 China Open, his first time competing in Beijing. In doubles, he teamed with Querrey, losing in the first round to Bob and Mike Bryan. In singles, Isner was unseeded, but made it to the semifinals, before losing to world no. 2 and defending champion Novak Djokovic. Isner next competed at the 2010 Shanghai Masters, where, unseeded, he made it to the second round, losing to world no. 3 and reigning Australian Open champion Roger Federer in their first meeting since the 2007 US Open.

=== 2011: Hopman Cup champion, first Major quarterfinal, two titles ===
Isner began the year by teaming with Bethanie Mattek-Sands to win the mixed doubles Hopman Cup final for the United States, defeating Belgium's Justine Henin and Ruben Bemelmans.

Following his win in Perth, Isner returned to Auckland to defend his ATP title at the 2011 Heineken Open. After a bye in his first round, the third seed faced Dutchman and world no. 52 Robin Haase. Isner defeated Haase to go through to the quarterfinals, where he was defeated by David Nalbandian in straight sets.

Isner next played at the 2011 Australian Open He entered the tournament seeded 20th and received a tough draw, including Radek Štěpánek, Marin Čilić, and Rafael Nadal. Isner came up against French world no. 69 Florent Serra, whom he easily defeated. Isner then faced Štěpánek in the second round where he would progress into the third round, rallying to ultimately win the match after losing the first set. He next faced fellow top 20 player Marin Čilić. The match went to five sets, with Čilić emerging as the eventual winner.

At the 2011 French Open, Isner was drawn against top seed and defending champion Rafael Nadal. Isner took a two-sets-to-one lead against Nadal, who had never played a five-set match at Roland Garros before. Nadal went on to win the title. In the 2011 Wimbledon men's singles draw, Isner was paired against Mahut in the first round, a rematch of the world's longest match from the previous year's tournament. Isner won in straight sets. However, he lost in the second round to the 16th seed Nicolás Almagro in four sets, dropping his 2011 record to 11–14.

Isner then accepted a last-minute wildcard to participate in the 2011 Hall of Fame Tennis Championships, replacing compatriot and defending champion Mardy Fish, who was chosen to play in the Davis Cup for the United States during that weekend. Isner was the top seed and defeated Karol Beck, Arnaud Clément, Alex Bogomolov Jr., and Tobias Kamke without dropping a set, to reach his first career grass-court final. In the final, he defeated Olivier Rochus to become the first top seed in 35 years to win the event. The title was his first of 2011 and second of his career, and ended a three-match losing streak in finals. The championship raised Isner's world ranking from no. 48 to no. 36.

Isner next played in the 2011 Atlanta Tennis Championships, where he was the third seed. He defeated James Blake, Lu Yen-hsun and Gilles Müller to reach his second consecutive tour final. In the final, he faced Mardy Fish in a rematch of the 2010 final. Isner was ultimately defeated by Fish. He then reached the semifinals of the Legg Mason Tennis Classic, defeating Tobias Kamke, James Blake and Viktor Troicki before losing to Gaël Monfils.

At the Rogers Cup, Isner defeated Marcos Baghdatis, but lost to Troicki in the second round. Isner won the Winston-Salem Open as the fourth seed, defeating Dudi Sela, Jarkko Nieminen, Baghdatis and Andy Roddick in the semifinals, before defeating Julien Benneteau in the final.

At the 2011 US Open, Isner defeated Marcos Baghdatis, Robby Ginepri, Alex Bogomolov Jr. and Gilles Simon on the way to his first Grand Slam quarterfinal. There, he was defeated by Andy Murray.

Isner reached the semifinals at the Masters 1000 Series event in Paris, where he held three match points before losing to Jo-Wilfried Tsonga. The result brought him back into the top 20. He would finish the year ranked no. 18, his second consecutive year-end top 20 ranking and his highest year-end ranking to date.

=== 2012: First Masters final & Top 10 debut, two titles ===
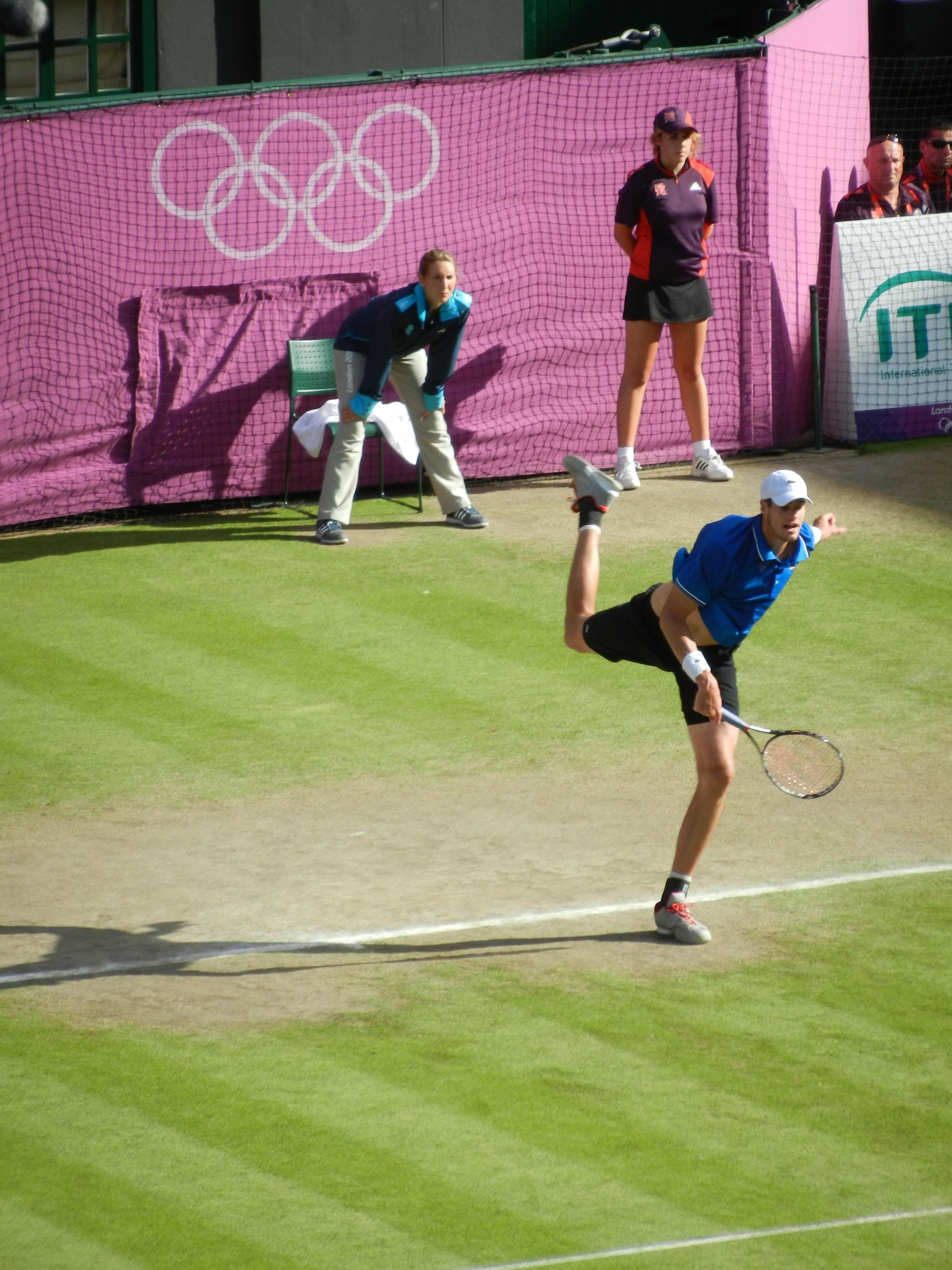
Isner serving in his 2012 Olympic men's singles quarterfinal match against Roger Federer

Isner defeated David Nalbandian in the second round of the 2012 Australian Open in a five-set match, but was defeated in the third round by Feliciano López. He beat world no. 3 Roger Federer in Switzerland in the first round of the Davis Cup, as well as beating Marco Chiudinelli in another singles rubber, to help propel the United States to victory over the Swiss.

He then reached the final of the 2012 Indian Wells Masters by beating world no. 1 Novak Djokovic in three sets in the semifinals, before being defeated by Federer in straight sets in the final. Isner also reached the doubles final of the same tournament, partnering Sam Querrey. As a result he reached the top 10 in singles on March 19, 2012.

In the Davis Cup quarterfinals against France, Isner defeated Gilles Simon in the first live rubber of the tie in straight sets. Two days later, Isner clinched the tie and propelled the United States into the semifinals by defeating French no. 1 Jo-Wilfried Tsonga in four sets.

A week before Roland Garros, he was the top seed at the 2012 Open de Nice Côte d'Azur, but was upset by Nikolay Davydenko in the quarterfinals.

At the 2012 French Open, he defeated Rogério Dutra da Silva in the first round before being defeated by wildcard Paul-Henri Mathieu in the second round: 6–7, 6–4, 6–4, 3–6, 18–16 in the second-longest-ever Roland Garros match at 5 hours and 41 minutes.

At the 2012 Wimbledon Championships, he was the eleventh seed. However, he was upset by 73rd-ranked Alejandro Falla in five sets, being eliminated in the first round. If he had won this match, he would have gone on to face Mahut for the third straight year. He beat Mahut at the Hall of Fame Tennis Championships in July, on his way to winning the championship for the second consecutive year.

Isner reached the semifinals at the 2012 Atlanta Tennis Championships, losing to Andy Roddick. Isner then defeated Milos Raonic in the quarterfinals of the Rogers Cup, but subsequently lost to Richard Gasquet for a place in the final.

Isner was chosen to be on special London 2012 Coke cans. He lost in the quarterfinals of the Olympics to eventual runner-up Roger Federer. In the men's doubles draw, he and Andy Roddick did not progress beyond the first round.

Isner won his second title of the year at the 2012 Winston-Salem Open, defeating Tomáš Berdych in the final. It was the second consecutive year that he won the title in Winston-Salem. At the 2012 US Open, he lost in the third round to Philipp Kohlschreiber.

=== 2013: Second Masters final, two titles ===
Isner was seeded first in Sydney, but he lost in the second round to Ryan Harrison in straight sets. He did not appear at the 2013 Australian Open the following week because of a bone bruise in his right knee.

Isner won his sixth ATP title and first on clay, defeating Nicolás Almagro in the U.S. Men's Clay Court Championships final in Houston. At the Monte Carlo Masters, he was eliminated in the first round. He also made early exits in Madrid and Rome.

At the 2013 French Open, Isner recovered from two sets down in his first-round match to beat Ryan Harrison in five sets. The next day, Isner once again recovered from two sets down to level the match, this time against Tommy Haas, saving a record 12 match points in the fourth set. However, Isner then let a lead slip and failed to convert a match point of his own and Haas eventually won the fifth set.

At the 2013 Topshelf Open in 's-Hertogenbosch, Isner bowed out in the first round, defeated by young Russian Evgeny Donskoy.

At Wimbledon, Isner was injured and had to retire during his second-round match against Frenchman Adrian Mannarino, after avenging himself on Donskoy in the first round.

In July, Isner won his second title of the year and his first in Atlanta, after appearing twice before in the final. He defeated Kevin Anderson in the final in a three-set tiebreaker match, which was billed as the tallest final in ATP history, their combined heights adding up to 13 feet, 6 inches.

In Washington, he reached the final and lost to Juan Martín del Potro after winning the first set. At the 2013 Rogers Cup in Montréal, Isner lost in the first round to the Canadian no. 2 Vasek Pospisil, who went on to reach the semifinals. He won the first set but then lost two consecutive tiebreakers.

During a busy summer, he reached another final in Cincinnati, beating Richard Gasquet and then three top-10 players in a row, first Milos Raonic, then Novak Djokovic, followed by a maiden triumph over Juan Martín del Potro in the semifinals. He lost to Rafael Nadal in his second Masters 1000 final and subsequently pulled out of the tournament in Winston-Salem. At the 2013 US Open he beat Gaël Monfils in the second round but lost for the second consecutive year to Philipp Kohlschreiber in the third round.

=== 2014: Eighth and ninth ATP titles ===
Isner started his season at the 2014 Hopman Cup with countrywoman Sloane Stephens, beginning strong with a win over Spain. However, the pair then lost their next two ties against France and the Czech Republic, respectively.

One week later, he won the 2014 Heineken Open, defeating Lu Yen-hsun in the final in two tiebreaker sets. At the 2014 Australian Open, he faced Martin Kližan in the first round, but after losing the first two sets, he ultimately retired due to an ankle injury.

Isner then reached the semifinals of the Delray Beach International Tennis Championships, losing to eventual champion Marin Čilić in straight sets.

At the 2014 Indian Wells Masters, Isner received a bye into round two, after which he defeated Nikolay Davydenko, Lu Yen-hsun, Fernando Verdasco and Ernests Gulbis en route to the semifinals, where he would face Novak Djokovic in a rematch of their 2012 semifinal. However, this time Isner lost in three sets. The semifinal run in Indian Wells did, however, secure him a return to the top 10.

At the Miami Masters, Isner again received a bye into round two, where he faced and beat Donald Young. He then defeated Nicolás Almagro in the third round, only to lose to Tomáš Berdych in the fourth round.

In Houston, he was defending a title, but lost his first match in the second round to Dustin Brown. With the points he lost, he slipped out of the top 10 to a ranking of no. 11.

In Madrid, he teamed up with Tomáš Berdych in the doubles draw. In singles, he made it to the third round, where he lost to David Ferrer. He was eliminated in the first round at the Rome Masters.

In Nice the week before the French Open, he made it to the quarterfinals, where he was defeated by Argentine Federico Delbonis. At Roland Garros, he reached the fourth round, where he lost to Berdych. He did not play a grass tune-up tournament before Wimbledon.

At the 2014 Wimbledon Championships, Isner reached the third round, where he lost to Feliciano López in four sets with three tiebreakers.

In Newport, Isner made it to the quarterfinals, where he lost to Jack Sock. However, he got revenge in the semifinals in Atlanta a couple of weeks later and went on to win the tournament, his ninth, with a win over Dudi Sela.

At the US Open, Isner reached the third round, where he lost to Philipp Kohlschreiber for the third consecutive year.

Isner hired Justin Gimelstob as his new coach at the end of the 2014 season.

=== 2015: Second Hopman final, tenth title ===
Isner started the season slowly, making the third round of the Australian Open and having only a quarterfinal showing in Memphis before making it into the semifinals in Miami with three wins in a row defeating Grigor Dimitrov, Milos Raonic and Kei Nishikori. He lost to Novak Djokovic in the semifinals.

He lost to Djokovic again in straight sets in Indian Wells in the third round after defeating qualifier Jürgen Melzer in the second round. In Monte Carlo, he lost to Rafael Nadal in the third round. He made the quarterfinals in Madrid, where he lost to Tomáš Berdych. In Nice, he made the semifinals, losing to Dominic Thiem.

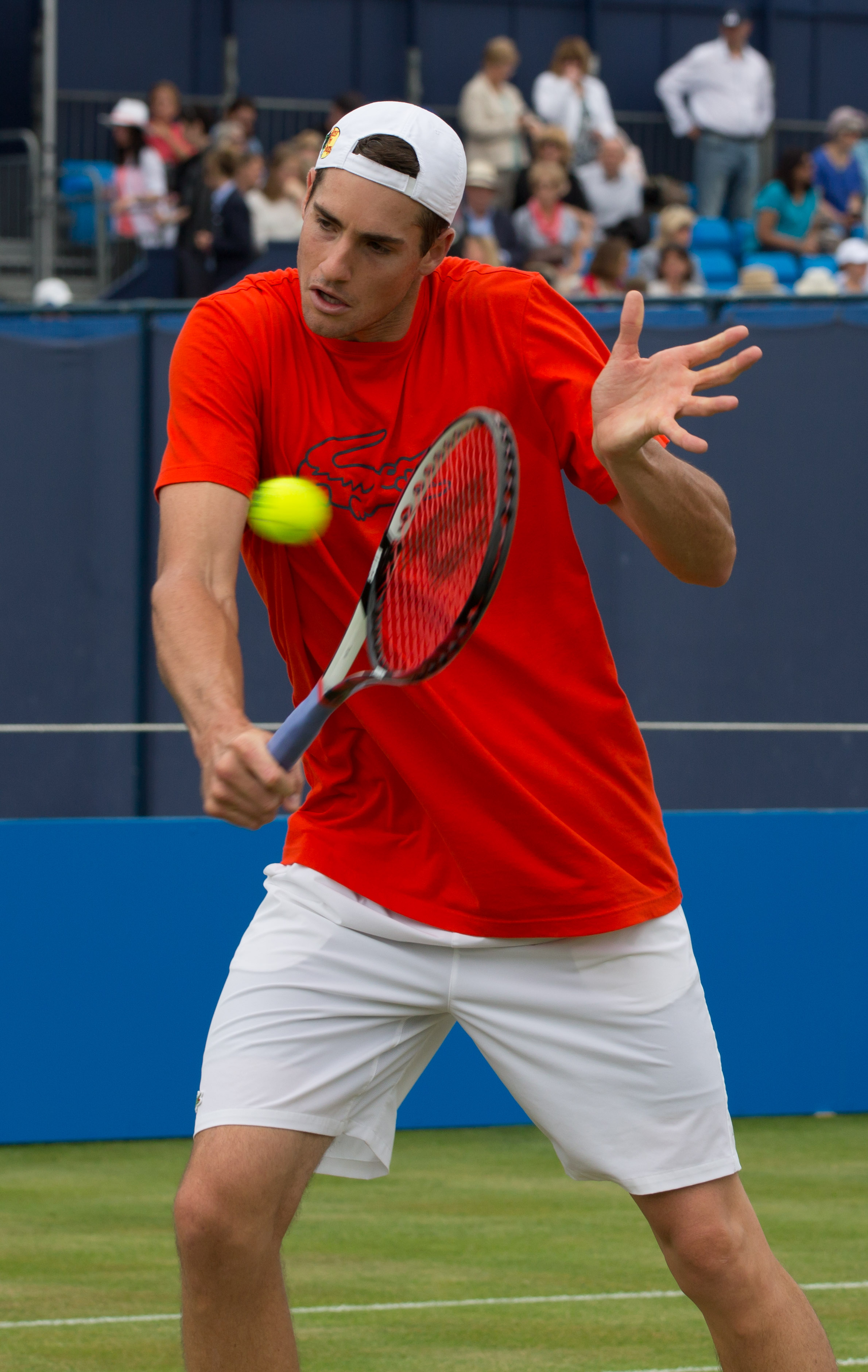
Isner during practice at the Aegon Championships in London, England

At Roland Garros, he lost to Jérémy Chardy in the second round. On grass, he made the quarterfinals in Queen's and the third round of Wimbledon, where he lost to then-world no. 9 Marin Čilić in five sets after two days of play, 10–12 in the decider.

Isner lost in the first round in Newport to eventual champion Rajeev Ram. He successfully defended his title in Atlanta in July to win his 10th ATP Tour title and third in a row at the tournament, defeating Marcos Baghdatis in the final in straight sets. The following week, he reached the final of the 500 tournament in Washington, D.C., losing in the final to Kei Nishikori. He also reached the quarterfinals of the Rogers Cup in Montréal, losing in three tiebreakers to Jérémy Chardy. However, the following week in Cincinnati, he bowed out in the first round against Sam Querrey. He then skipped Winston-Salem, his home tournament, the week before the US Open.

At the US Open, Isner advanced to the fourth round, losing to Federer in straight sets. It was his best Grand Slam result of the year. He reached the third round in Shanghai, losing to Andy Murray in three sets before reaching his third Masters quarterfinal of the year in Paris, after beating Federer in three sets. Isner finished the year at world no. 11, his best year-end ranking to date.

=== 2016: Third Masters final, seventh consecutive top 20 finish ===
Isner started his season in Auckland and reached the quarterfinals, losing to the eventual champion Roberto Bautista Agut. At the 2016 Australian Open, he reached the fourth round for the first time in six years, defeating Spaniards Marcel Granollers and Feliciano López before losing to David Ferrer in straights sets. Instead of playing the US spring hardcourt tournaments, Isner decided to play two clay court tournaments in South America, losing his first match in both to Dušan Lajović and Guido Pella, respectively. In the first round of the 2016 Davis Cup, Isner defeated Bernard Tomic and Sam Groth to help upset Australia 3–1 and move the United States into the quarterfinals against Croatia.

Isner reached the fourth round at the BNP Paribas Open for the third year in a row, where he lost to Kei Nishikori. He was then upset early at the 2016 Miami Open by Tim Smyczek. Despite missing most of the clay season, only playing the U.S. Men's Clay Court Championships and the Geneva Open, Isner reached the fourth round of the 2016 French Open for only the second time in his career, losing to eventual finalist Andy Murray in straight sets. Isner's season continued with early losses in both grass tournaments he played, losing to Gilles Müller at the 2016 Aegon Championships in addition to a marathon match against Jo-Wilfried Tsonga at the 2016 Wimbledon Championships.

Isner started the US Open Series with a disappointing loss in the second round of the 2016 Rogers Cup to Ryan Harrison. Isner rebounded by reaching his first final of the season and his fourth consecutive final at the Atlanta Open, losing in straight sets to Nick Kyrgios. Isner skipped the Summer Olympics due to it lacking ranking points and prize money, electing to focus on the summer hardcourt tournaments of the US Open Series. After Isner lost in straight sets in the second round to Milos Raonic and Steve Johnson reached the quarterfinals in Cincinnati, Isner lost the title of the top-ranked American man for the first time in three years. Although he regained it in the following week, Johnson took it back again following the 2016 US Open, after Isner was unable to defend his fourth-round points, losing in the third round to Kyle Edmund in four sets.

Isner teamed up with Jack Sock to win his second Masters doubles title and fourth overall doubles title at the 2016 Shanghai Masters. Unseeded at the final regular tournament of the season, Isner would prevail against seeded players David Ferrer and Marin Čilić to reach his third Masters final and second final of the season at the 2016 BNP Paribas Masters in Paris. His semifinal victory allowed him to again finish the year as the no. 1 American for the fifth consecutive year and inside the top 20 for the seventh consecutive season. In the final, Isner lost to the newly crowned world no. 1 Andy Murray, thus leaving him titleless in singles for the first time since 2009.

=== 2017: Eleventh and twelfth ATP titles ===
Isner reached the quarterfinals at the 2017 ASB Classic, the 2017 Memphis Open and the U.S. Men's Clay Court Championships. He reached the semifinals in Rome at the Italian Open, where he was defeated by eventual champion Alexander Zverev. At the French Open, Isner started strongly, defeating Jordan Thompson and Paolo Lorenzi in the first and second rounds, respectively. However, he fell in the third round to Karen Khachanov in four sets.

Isner competed at the 2017 Wimbledon Championships, where he defeated qualifier Taylor Fritz in the first round before losing to Dudi Sela in five sets. At the Dell Technologies Hall of Fame Open in Newport, Isner defeated qualifier Matthew Ebden 6–3, 7–6 in the final to win his first singles title of the year.

Isner won the Atlanta BB&T Open on July 30, defeating fellow countryman Ryan Harrison 7–6, 7–6 in two evenly contested tiebreak sets. Isner claimed this title for the fourth time out of seven finals.

=== 2018: First Masters title, maiden Grand Slam semifinal, world No. 8 ===
Isner failed to win a match throughout January 2018, losing in the round of 16 at the Auckland Open and in the first round of the Australian Open to Matthew Ebden. However, 2018 proved to be Isner's most successful year in terms of Grand Slam results.

He won the 2018 Indian Wells doubles title with his partner Jack Sock, defeating the Bryan Brothers in two tiebreak sets. Isner then played at the Miami Open, where he won his first Masters 1000 title, defeating Alexander Zverev in the final. With this win, Isner returned to his career-high ranking of world No. 9.

Isner reached the fourth round of the French Open. At Wimbledon, he advanced to his first Grand Slam quarterfinal since the 2011 US Open. In the quarterfinal, Isner defeated Milos Raonic in four sets to advance to the first Grand Slam semifinal of his career, but he lost to South African Kevin Anderson in five sets, 7–6, 6–7, 6–7, 6–4, 26–24. At six hours and 36 minutes, the match was the fourth-longest match in history and the second-longest at a Grand Slam tournament after Isner's first-round defeat of Nicolas Mahut in 2010, also at Wimbledon. Analysts credited Isner's aggressive return style and strong serve-and-volley game for his success in 2018 at Wimbledon.

Isner won the 2018 Atlanta Open, defeating Ryan Harrison 5–7, 6–3, 6–4. This was Isner's fifth title at Atlanta. At the US Open, Isner reached his second quarterfinal at a Slam in 2018 before losing to Juan Martín del Potro. Following the birth of his first child, Isner skipped the Asian portion of the tour. He reached the semifinal at Stockholm but lost to qualifier Ernest Gulbis. At Vienna, he lost to Gaël Monfils in the second round.

=== 2019: Fifth Masters final, tenth consecutive top 20 finish ===
Isner reached the final of the 2019 Miami Open, where he lost to Roger Federer. He finished the year ranked No. 19, his tenth consecutive top 20 finish.

=== 2020: Sixth Australian Open third round, COVID-19 season ===
Isner opened the 2020 season by reaching the 2020 ASB Classic semifinals before falling to eventual champion Ugo Humbert 6–7, 4–6. In the Australian Open, he reached the third round before retiring with a foot injury during the second set against former champion Stan Wawrinka.

Isner advanced to the semifinals of the Mexican Open before the COVID-19 pandemic halted the ATP tour until the Cincinnati Masters, where Isner lost in the third round to Stefanos Tsitsipas in straight sets.

=== 2021: Sixth Atlanta title, thirteenth Masters semifinal, out of and return to top 30 ===
In April, Isner was not able to defend his points from the previous final at the 2021 Miami Open and fell from the top 30 for the first time in 10 years. Even though he reached the quarterfinals at the 2021 Mutua Madrid Open, Isner still remained out of the top 30. The drop in the rankings marked the first time that no American men were ranked in the top 30 since computerized tennis rankings were introduced in 1973.

At the 2021 French Open, Isner reached the third round, losing to eventual finalist Stefanos Tsitsipas in four sets.

In July 2021, Isner won his sixth ATP doubles title at the 2021 Los Cabos Open, partnering with Hans Hach Verdugo as wild-card entries.

At the 2021 Atlanta Open, Isner defeated Brandon Nakashima to win a record sixth title in his ninth finals appearance at the event.

At the Canadian Open, Isner reached the semifinals, defeating multiple seeded players such as 13th seed Cristian Garín, 4th seed Andrey Rublev and 11th seed Gaël Monfils. He lost in the semifinals to top seed Daniil Medvedev in straight sets. Isner's performance at the tournament elevated him to No. 26 on August 16, 2021.

=== 2022: Historic "Sunshine double" Masters doubles titles, top 15 in doubles, and aces record ===
Isner partnered with Jack Sock in doubles at Indian Wells and they won the title, beating Santiago González and Édouard Roger-Vasselin in the final. Isner next partnered with Hubert Hurkacz for the 2022 Miami Masters and defeated reigning 2022 Australian Open champions Thanasi Kokkinakis and Nick Kyrgios in the semifinals and then the sixth-seeded Wesley Koolhof and Neal Skupski in the final. By doing so, Isner became the second man in history (after Jakob Hlasek in 1989) to win the elusive Sunshine Double. The title was Isner's fifth ATP Masters 1000 doubles title and eighth overall.

At the 2022 Italian Open, Isner partnered with Diego Schwartzman to defeat Andrey Golubev and Máximo González in the semifinal, becoming the first player to reach three Masters 1000 doubles finals with three different partners in the same year. As a result of this run, he reached the top 20 in doubles on May 16, 2022. At the 2022 French Open, Isner lost in the third round to qualifier Bernabe Zapata Miralles in five sets after more than three hours of play.

At the 2022 Wimbledon Championships, Isner served 54 aces in a five-set win over Enzo Couacaud and 36 more in defeating Andy Murray in four sets. In his third-round match against Jannik Sinner, Isner passed Ivo Karlovic's ATP record of 13,728 career aces. In the match against Sinner, Isner hit 24 aces and became the fifth man since 1991 to reach 1000 aces at Wimbledon. Isner lost his match against Jannik Sinner in straight sets.

At the 2022 US Open, Isner withdrew from his second round match with a wrist injury. Isner won his first round match against Federico Delbonis with 19 aces, but fractured his left wrist during the match.

Isner returned to competition at the 2022 Rolex Paris Masters – Singles. He advanced to the second round where he lost to Andrey Rublev in straight sets.

=== 2023: 500th tiebreak record in Open Era, Retirement ===
At the 2023 Dallas Open, he reached the semifinals after defeating Emilio Gómez. In the process, he won his 500th tiebreak, becoming the first man to achieve that record in the Open Era. Next he defeated compatriot J. J. Wolf to reach his 31st final. He lost in the final to Wu Yibing after firing 44 aces, the second most ever in a best of three sets match after Ivo Karlović, who had 45 in Halle. He exited the top 100 on June 12, 2023.

In Newport, Isner reached what would be the last semifinal of his career, after beating Alex Bolt, Corentin Moutet, and top seed Tommy Paul. He lost to Alex Michelsen.

In August 2023, Isner announced that the US Open would be the final event of his career. On August 31, 2023, Isner played his last singles match, losing in the second round to Michael Mmoh in five sets. He retired on September 1, 2023 following the last match in his career in doubles, partnering with Jack Sock.

== Longest matches in Grand Slam history ==
Isner has also earned a reputation for competing in extremely even, long duration matches and holds the unique distinction of having been a competitor in the longest and second-longest matches in a major tournament in history. The first was the now-legendary opening-round match at the 2010 Wimbledon Championships when Isner defeated Nicolas Mahut in 11 hours and 5 minutes in a match played over three separate days. The second-longest match in major tournament history was Isner's loss to South African Kevin Anderson in the first men's semifinal at the 2018 Wimbledon Championships.

The longest match in history: Isner v Mahut, June 22–24, 2010

At the 2010 Wimbledon Championships, Isner faced qualifier Nicolas Mahut in the first round. Isner won the match 6–4, 3–6, 6–7^{(7–9)}, 7–6^{(7–3)}, 70–68.

The final set alone was longer than the previous longest match.

In the match, Isner set the record for the most aces served in a match, breaking Ivo Karlović's record of 78; Mahut passed the old mark as well. Isner set a new record of 113 aces, ahead of the 103 aces served by Mahut.

The first four sets were played on June 22. At 21:13 BST on June 23 the match was suspended due to darkness for a second day at 59–59 in the fifth set. The match resumed on June 24, at 15:30 BST, starting the third day of the match. Overall, the match lasted eleven hours and five minutes. Isner also set the record for the most games won in a Wimbledon match with 92.

The match brought Isner a measure of fame, particularly in the United Kingdom and his native United States. He had guest appearances on Good Morning America and the Late Show with David Letterman, and threw the ceremonial first pitch at a New York Yankees game in Yankee Stadium. He and Mahut won the 2010 ESPY Award for Best Record-Breaking Performance in sport.

Line score:
2010 Wimbledon Championships – Men's Opening Round	1 (32')	2 (29')	3 (49')	4 (64')	5 (491')
(United States) John Isner (23)	6	3	6^{7}	7	70
(France) Nicolas Mahut (Q)	4	6	7	6^{3}	68

The second-longest match: Isner v Anderson, July 13, 2018

This match saw Isner face similarly big-serving Kevin Anderson of South Africa. The match is the longest tennis match ever in the second week of a Grand Slam tournament, both by time and number of games played. It is also the longest-ever match on Centre Court, and the fourth-longest tennis match of all time.

The first three sets were all decided by tiebreakers, the first going to Anderson and both the second and third going to Isner. In the fourth set Anderson exploited an opening and broke Isner's serve to make the score 7–6, 6–7, 6–7, 6–4 going into a fifth set in which Anderson seemed to have gained significant momentum from his service break. The fifth quickly became a battle of services as both players began to tire. At 16–17 it began to rain, leading to speculation of a delay to close the Centre Court roof, but the rain stopped during the crossover break. Isner endured a shaky mistake which permitted Anderson to get back in the game to 40–30 from 40–0 down, but Isner forced Anderson to miss the next backhand return and held serve. At 24–24, Anderson built up a 0–40 lead and while Isner got back two of those points to bring the score to 30–40, Anderson broke Isner on his third break point of the game, and served out to win the match in 6 hours and 36 minutes, with the scoreline reading 7–6, 6–7, 6–7, 6–4, 26–24.

Line score:
2018 Wimbledon's Championships – Men's Semifinals	1 (63')	2 (54')	3 (61')	4 (43')	5 (175')
(South Africa) Kevin Anderson (8)	7	6^{5}	6^{9}	6	26
(United States) John Isner (9)	6^{6}	7	7	4	24

== Playing style and equipment ==
Isner had an extremely powerful and consistent serve, thanks in part to his 6-foot-9 3/4-inch height which made him the third-tallest player in tour history, behind Ivo Karlović and Reilly Opelka. Commentators have also praised his serve's composure under pressure. Isner also had a powerful forehand, used in tandem with his serve in one-two points: a big serve followed by a big forehand. He was also known to follow his serves with approaches to the net, though not strictly in a serve-and-volley tactic. Isner's movement around the court was limited by his large body, and he struggled most with players who moved him around the court. Isner's fitness improved considerably during his career, as displayed during his win in the longest tennis match ever at Wimbledon against Nicolas Mahut.

Because of his dependence on his powerful and consistent serve, Isner won a great majority of his service games. But simultaneously, his limited movement made it difficult to break the opponent's serve. This resulted in long matches where each player continues holding serve until the set reaches a tiebreak. At Grand Slam tournaments with no fifth-set tiebreaks, his matches could extend very long: indeed, he played in the two longest major matches in history during the 2010 and 2018 Wimbledon Championships. In large part due to Isner, in 2022 all four majors adopted 10-point fifth-set tiebreakers.

As of January 2012, Isner was sponsored by Lacoste and Prince for his attire and rackets, respectively. His attire carried through most of 2015. He switched his attire to FILA in 2016 at the Australian Open.

== Coaches ==
Isner's first coach was Craig Boynton, who worked with him from 2009 to 2012 and helped develop his style of play. Isner and Boynton split over reportedly mutual agreement. Isner then hired Mike Sell, who helped him to significant success, such as defeating Roger Federer, David Nalbandian and Novak Djokovic. During his time with Sell, Isner's ranking stayed around no. 10 in the world. After parting from Sell in 2014, Isner teamed with Justin Gimelstob and worked with him until April 2016. With Gimelstob, Isner's ranking stayed around 10, until 2016, where he dropped to 17. Thereafter, he worked with coaches Rene Moller and David Macpherson.

== Pickleball ==
In June 2024, Isner made his professional pickleball debut in men's doubles at the Texas Open.

== Personal life ==
While at the University of Georgia, Isner majored in speech communication. He resided in Tampa, Florida, where he trained at the Saddlebrook Academy alongside other American tennis pros such as James Blake and Mardy Fish. Currently, he resides in Dallas, Texas.

Isner married Madison McKinley, a jewelry designer, on December 2, 2017, in Bluffton, South Carolina. They have four children and are currently expecting their fifth.

He is one of the hosts of the "Nothing Major" podcast since 2024 with his fellow retired American players Sam Querrey, Steve Johnson, and Jack Sock.

== Career statistics ==
=== Grand Slam tournament performance timeline ===
Key
W	F	SF	QF	#R	RR	Q#	DNQ	A	NH

(W) winner; (F) finalist; (SF) semifinalist; (QF) quarterfinalist; (#R) rounds 4, 3, 2, 1; (RR) round-robin stage; (Q#) qualification round; (DNQ) did not qualify; (A) absent; (NH) not held; (SR) strike rate (events won / competed); (W–L) win–loss record.
To avoid confusion and double counting, these charts are updated at the conclusion of a tournament or when the player's participation has ended.

Tournament	2007	2008	2009	2010	2011	2012	2013	2014	2015	2016	2017	2018	2019	2020	2021	2022	2023	SR	W–L	Win%
Australian Open	A	1R	1R	4R	3R	3R	A	1R	3R	4R	2R	1R	1R	3R	A	1R	1R	0 / 14	15–14	52%
French Open	A	1R	A	3R	1R	2R	3R	4R	2R	4R	3R	4R	A	2R	3R	3R	1R	0 / 14	22–14	61%
Wimbledon	A	1R	A	2R	2R	1R	2R	3R	3R	3R	2R	SF	2R	NH	1R	3R	1R	0 / 14	18–14	56%
US Open	3R	1R	4R	3R	QF	3R	3R	3R	4R	3R	3R	QF	3R	1R	1R	2R	2R	0 / 17	32–16	67%
Win–loss	2–1	0–4	3–2	8–4	7–4	5–4	5–3	7–4	8–4	10–4	6–4	12–4	3–3	3–3	2–3	5–3	1–4	0 / 59	87–58	60%

== Significant finals ==
=== Masters 1000 finals ===
==== Singles: 5 (1 title, 4 runner-ups) ====
Result	Year	Tournament	Surface	Opponent	Score
Loss	2012	Indian Wells Masters	Hard	(Switzerland) Roger Federer	6–7^{(7–9)}, 3–6
Loss	2013	Cincinnati Masters	Hard	(Spain) Rafael Nadal	6–7^{(8–10)}, 6–7^{(3–7)}
Loss	2016	Paris Masters	Hard (i)	(United Kingdom) Andy Murray	3–6, 7–6^{(7–4)}, 4–6
Win	2018	Miami Open	Hard	(Germany) Alexander Zverev	6–7^{(4–7)}, 6–4, 6–4
Loss	2019	Miami Open	Hard	(Switzerland) Roger Federer	1–6, 4–6

==== Doubles: 8 (5 titles, 3 runner-ups) ====
Result	Year	Tournament	Surface	Partner	Opponents	Score
Loss	2010	Italian Open	Clay	(United States) Sam Querrey	(United States) Bob Bryan (United States) Mike Bryan	3–6, 2–6
Win	2011	Italian Open	Clay	(United States) Sam Querrey	(United States) Mardy Fish (United States) Andy Roddick	w/o
Loss	2012	Indian Wells Masters	Hard	(United States) Sam Querrey	(Spain) Rafael Nadal (Spain) Marc López	2–6, 6–7^{(3–7)}
Win	2016	Shanghai Masters	Hard	(United States) Jack Sock	(Finland) Henri Kontinen (Australia) John Peers	6–4, 6–4
Win	2018	Indian Wells Masters	Hard	(United States) Jack Sock	(United States) Bob Bryan (United States) Mike Bryan	7–6^{(7–4)}, 7–6^{(7–2)}
Win	2022	Indian Wells Masters	Hard	(United States) Jack Sock	(Mexico) Santiago González (France) Édouard Roger-Vasselin	7–6^{(7–4)}, 6–3
Win	2022	Miami Open	Hard	(Poland) Hubert Hurkacz	(Netherlands) Wesley Koolhof (United Kingdom) Neal Skupski	7–6^{(7–5)}, 6–4
Loss	2022	Italian Open	Clay	(Argentina) Diego Schwartzman	(Croatia) Nikola Mektić (Croatia) Mate Pavić	2–6, 7–6^{(8–6)}, [10–12]

== Records ==
- These records were attained in the Open Era of tennis.

Tournament	Year	Record accomplished	Player tied
Wimbledon	2010	113 aces in an ATP singles match	Stands alone
Wimbledon	2010	113 aces in a Grand Slam singles match	Stands alone
Wimbledon	2010	85 aces in a single set	Stands alone
Wimbledon	2010	92 games won in a single match	Stands alone
Wimbledon	2010	91 games lost in a single match that he won	Stands alone
Wimbledon	2010	246 winners in a single match	Stands alone
Wimbledon	2010	Longest singles match ever played (11 hours, 5 minutes)	(France) Nicolas Mahut
Wimbledon	2010	Longest play in a single day (7 hours, 6 minutes)	(France) Nicolas Mahut
Wimbledon	2010	118 games in a single day	(France) Nicolas Mahut
Wimbledon	2018	Longest Grand Slam semifinal ever played (6 hours, 32 minutes)	(South Africa) Kevin Anderson
Hall of Fame Championships	2017	Won an ATP tournament never facing a break point	(Germany) Tommy Haas (Australia) Alex de Minaur
Hall of Fame Championships	2011, 2012, 2017, 2019	4 singles titles	Stands alone
Atlanta Open	2013–2015, 2017, 2018, 2021	6 singles titles	Stands alone
Atlanta Open	2010, 2011, 2013–2018, 2021	9 finals	Stands alone
ATP Tour	2007–2023	14,470 aces served	Stands alone
ATP Tour	2007–2023	506 tiebreaks won	Stands alone
ATP Tour	2007–2023	844 tiebreaks played	Stands alone

== Notes ==
Awards and achievements
Preceded by (France) Jo-Wilfried Tsonga	ATP Most Improved Player; 2009	Succeeded by (Kazakhstan) Andrey Golubev
Preceded by (United States) Michael Phelps	Best Record-Breaking Performance ESPY Award (with (France) Nicolas Mahut); 2010	Succeeded by (United Kingdom) Rory McIlroy
