= 1999 Legg Mason Tennis Classic – Singles =

Singles
- 1999 Legg Mason Tennis Classic

Final
- Champion: (United States) Andre Agassi
- Runner-up: (Russia) Yevgeny Kafelnikov
- Score: 7–6^{(7–3)}, 6–1

Details
- Draw: 48 (7Q / 6WC)
- Seeds: 16

Events
Singles	Doubles
← 1998 ·	Washington Open	· 2000 →

Andre Agassi was the defending champion and won for the second straight year in the final 7–6^{(7–3)}, 6–1, over Yevgeny Kafelnikov.

== Seeds ==
1. (Russia) Yevgeny Kafelnikov (final)
2. (United States) Andre Agassi (champion)
3. (United Kingdom) Tim Henman (third round)
4. (United States) Todd Martin (semifinals)
5. (Spain) Àlex Corretja (third round)
6. (Germany) Nicolas Kiefer (semifinals)
7. (Switzerland) Marc Rosset (third round)
8. (Russia) Marat Safin (third round)
9. (France) Fabrice Santoro (quarterfinals)
10. (Germany) Rainer Schüttler (second round)
11. (United States) Jan-Michael Gambill (third round)
12. (Zimbabwe) Byron Black (first round)
13. (United States) Michael Chang (second round)
14. (Slovakia) Ján Krošlák (quarterfinals)
15. (Australia) Richard Fromberg (first round)
16. (Uruguay) Marcelo Filippini (first round)

== Draw ==
=== Key ===
- WC - Wildcard
- Q - Qualifier
- SE - Special Exempt
- r - Retired

=== Finals ===
Quarterfinals
1	(Russia) Yevgeny Kafelnikov	6	6^{7}	7
(Czech Republic) Tomáš Zíb	1	7^{9}	5
14	(Slovakia) Ján Krošlák	4	3
6	(Germany) Nicolas Kiefer	6	6
(United States) Paul Goldstein	4	5
4	(United States) Todd Martin	6	7
9	(France) Fabrice Santoro	4	5
1	(United States) Andre Agassi	6	7

Semifinals
1	(Russia) Yevgeny Kafelnikov	6	2	6
6	(Germany) Nicolas Kiefer	2	6	3
4	(United States) Todd Martin	4	2
2	(United States) Andre Agassi	6	6

Finals
1	(Russia) Yevgeny Kafelnikov	6^{3}	1
2	(United States) Andre Agassi	7^{7}	6

=== Earlier rounds ===
==== Section 1 ====
First round
(Germany) O Gross	3	1
(Zimbabwe) W Black	6	6
WC	(United States) P Osuna	4	1
(Australia) W Arthurs	6	6
(United States) J Gimelstob	6	2	7^{7}
15	(Australia) R Fromberg	4	6	6^{4}
10	(Germany) R Schüttler	6	7
(Sweden) N Kulti	1	5
(Czech Republic) T Zíb	7^{7}	7^{7}
(Spain) J Díaz	6^{1}	6^{4}
WC	(Croatia) I Ljubičić	6	3	4
WC	(Chile) F González	1	6	6

Second round
1	(Russia) Y Kafelnikov	0	6	6
(Zimbabwe) W Black	6	2	4
(Australia) W Arthurs	4	1
(United States) J Gimelstob	6	6
10	(Germany) R Schüttler	7^{7}	5	0
(Czech Republic) T Zíb	6^{2}	7	3
WC	(Chile) F González	6^{9}	4
7	(Switzerland) M Rosset	7^{11}	6

Third round
1	(Russia) Y Kafelnikov	7	6
(United States) J Gimelstob	5	4
(Czech Republic) T Zíb	6	6
7	(Switzerland) M Rosset	3	2

Quarterfinals
1	(Russia) Y Kafelnikov	6	6^{7}	7
(Czech Republic) T Zíb	1	7^{9}	5

==== Section 2 ====
First round
(Netherlands) P Wessels	6	6
WC	(United States) J Blake	4	1
(Switzerland) L Manta	2	6	6
(Japan) T Suzuki	6	4	2
Q	(Australia) B Ellwood	2	4
14	(Slovakia) J Krošlák	6	6
11	(United States) J Gambill	6^{3}	6	4
(Denmark) K Carlsen	7^{7}	4	6
(Italy) V Santopadre	1	1
(Netherlands) J Lottum	6	6
Q	(United States) M Washington	2	6	6
(Argentina) J Chela	6	3	4

Second round
3	(United Kingdom) T Henman	7^{7}	7
(Netherlands) P Wessels	6^{2}	5
(Switzerland) L Manta	5	6^{3}
14	(Slovakia) J Krošlák	7	7^{7}
(Denmark) K Carlsen	4	6	6^{5}
(Netherlands) J Lottum	6	1	7^{7}
Q	(United States) M Washington	4	2
6	(Germany) N Kiefer	6	6

Third round
3	(United Kingdom) T Henman	6	3	4
14	(Slovakia) J Krošlák	3	6	6
(Netherlands) J Lottum	5	2
6	(Germany) N Kiefer	7	6

Quarterfinals
14	(Slovakia) J Krošlák	4	3
6	(Germany) N Kiefer	6	6

==== Section 3 ====
First round
(Australia) S Draper	3	3
(Italy) G Pozzi	6	6
(United States) P Goldstein	7	6
(United States) C Mamiit	5	4
(Czech Republic) M Damm	6	6
12	(Zimbabwe) B Black	2	2
13	(United States) M Chang	6	6
Q	(Federal Republic of Yugoslavia) N Zimonjić	0	1
Q	(Georgia (country)) I Labadze	6	6^{3}	1
(Paraguay) R Delgado	3	7^{7}	6
(Romania) A Voinea	5	0
WC	(Denmark) K Pless	7	6

Second round
5	(Spain) À Corretja	7^{7}	1	7
(Italy) G Pozzi	6^{5}	6	5
(United States) P Goldstein	5	7	6
(Czech Republic) M Damm	7	5	2
13	(United States) M Chang	4	6	3
(Paraguay) R Delgado	6	1	6
WC	(Denmark) K Pless	4	4
4	(United States) Todd Martin	6	6

Third round
5	(Spain) À Corretja	6^{9}	6^{5}
(United States) P Goldstein	7^{11}	7^{7}
(Paraguay) R Delgado
4	(United States) Todd Martin	w/o

Quarterfinals
(United States) Paul Goldstein	4	5
4	(United States) Todd Martin	6	7

==== Section 4 ====
First round
(Germany) B Karbacher	4	6	1
(Canada) S Lareau	6	3	6
Q	(Zimbabwe) K Ullyett	7^{7}	6^{5}	3
(Haiti) R Agénor	6^{3}	7^{7}	6
(Argentina) H Gumy	3	6	1
9	(France) Fabrice Santoro	6	3	6
16	(Uruguay) M Filippini	3	3
(Italy) L Tieleman	6	6
(Switzerland) R Federer	2	3
Q	(Germany) B Phau	6	6
WC	(Belgium) X Malisse	3	6	5
Q	(Sweden) M Tillström	6	3	7

Second round
8	(Russia) M Safin	7	7^{7}
(Canada) S Lareau	5	6^{2}
(Haiti) R Agénor	4	4
9	(France) Fabrice Santoro	6	6
(Italy) L Tieleman	6	3	4
Q	(Germany) B Phau	3	6	6
Q	(Sweden) M Tillström	1	1
2	(United States) Andre Agassi	6	6

Third round
8	(Russia) M Safin	0	4
9	(France) Fabrice Santoro	6	6
Q	(Germany) B Phau	1	3
2	(United States) Andre Agassi	6	6

Quarterfinals
9	(France) Fabrice Santoro	4	5
2	(United States) Andre Agassi	6	7

== Qualifying ==
=== Qualifying seeds ===
1. (Sweden) Mikael Tillström (qualified)
2. (Zimbabwe) Kevin Ullyett (qualified)
3. (South Africa) Marcos Ondruska (first round)
4. (South Africa) Neville Godwin (qualifying competition)
5. (Australia) Michael Hill (qualifying competition)
6. (Federal Republic of Yugoslavia) Nenad Zimonjić (qualified)
7. (Switzerland) Ivo Heuberger (first round)
8. (United States) David Caldwell (first round)
9. (United States) Michael Joyce (qualifying competition)
10. (United States) Brian MacPhie (first round)
11. (United Kingdom) Barry Cowan (first round)
12. (United States) Michael Russell (first round)
13. (Australia) Mark Draper (qualifying competition)
14. (Canada) Frédéric Niemeyer (qualifying competition)

=== Qualifiers ===
1. (Sweden) Mikael Tillström
2. (Zimbabwe) Kevin Ullyett
3. (Georgia (country)) Irakli Labadze
4. (Germany) Björn Phau
5. (United States) Mashiska Washington
6. (Federal Republic of Yugoslavia) Nenad Zimonjić
7. (Australia) Ben Ellwood

=== Qualifying draw ===
==== First qualifier ====
First round
1	(Sweden) Mikael Tillström	6	6
WC	(United States) Thomas Blake	2	2
(South Africa) Wesley Whitehouse	4	3
13	(Australia) Mark Draper	6	6

Qualifying competition
1	(Sweden) Mikael Tillström	5	6	6
13	(Australia) Mark Draper	7	3	1

==== Second qualifier ====
First round
2	(Zimbabwe) Kevin Ullyett	6	6
(United States) Scott Humphries	4	3
(Canada) Simon Larose	6	6	1
14	(Canada) Frédéric Niemeyer	3	7	6

Qualifying competition
2	(Zimbabwe) Kevin Ullyett	6	6
14	(Canada) Frédéric Niemeyer	3	4

==== Third qualifier ====
First round
3	(South Africa) Marcos Ondruska	4	2
(Greece) Solon Peppas	6	6
WC	(Georgia (country)) Irakli Labadze	6	6
12	(United States) Michael Russell	1	4

Qualifying competition
(Greece) Solon Peppas	2	1
WC	(Georgia (country)) Irakli Labadze	6	6

==== Fourth qualifier ====
First round
4	(South Africa) Neville Godwin	6	6
WC	(United States) H'Cone Thompson	1	0
(Germany) Björn Phau	6	3	7
10	(United States) Brian MacPhie	2	6	6

Qualifying competition
4	(South Africa) Neville Godwin	2	4
(Germany) Björn Phau	6	6

==== Fifth qualifier ====
First round
5	(Australia) Michael Hill	6	4	7
(Italy) Uros Vico	4	6	6
(United States) Mashiska Washington	5	6	6
11	(United Kingdom) Barry Cowan	7	3	3

Qualifying competition
5	(Australia) Michael Hill	4	2
(United States) Mashiska Washington	6	6

==== Sixth qualifier ====
First round
6	(Federal Republic of Yugoslavia) Nenad Zimonjić	6	6
(United States) Steve Campbell	3	4
(Canada) Bobby Kokavec	6	7
8	(United States) David Caldwell	4	5

Qualifying competition
6	(Federal Republic of Yugoslavia) Nenad Zimonjić	6	7	7
(Canada) Bobby Kokavec	7	6	6

==== Seventh qualifier ====
First round
7	(Switzerland) Ivo Heuberger	3	6	6
(Australia) Ben Ellwood	6	3	7
WC	(United States) Torrey Gambill	3	1
9	(United States) Michael Joyce	6	6

Qualifying competition
(Australia) Ben Ellwood	6	6
9	(United States) Michael Joyce	3	4
