= 1995 Legg Mason Tennis Classic – Doubles =

Doubles
- 1995 Legg Mason Tennis Classic

Final
- Champions: (France) Olivier Delaître (United States) Jeff Tarango
- Runners-up: (Czech Republic) Petr Korda (Czech Republic) Cyril Suk
- Score: 1–6, 6–3, 6–2

Details
- Draw: 28
- Seeds: 8

Events
Singles	Doubles
← 1994 ·	Washington Open	· 1996 →

Grant Connell and Patrick Galbraith were the defending champions, but lost in the second round to Mark Draper and Scott Draper.

Olivier Delaître and Jeff Tarango won the title by defeating Petr Korda and Cyril Suk 1–6, 6–3, 6–2 in the final.

== Seeds ==
The first four seeds received a bye to the second round.

1. (Canada) Grant Connell / (United States) Patrick Galbraith (second round)
2. (Zimbabwe) Byron Black / (United States) Jonathan Stark (semifinals)
3. (United States) Patrick McEnroe / (United States) Richey Reneberg (quarterfinals)
4. (South Africa) David Adams / (Czech Republic) Martin Damm (quarterfinals)
5. (Czech Republic) Petr Korda / (Czech Republic) Cyril Suk (final)
6. (France) Olivier Delaître / (United States) Jeff Tarango (champions)
7. (United States) Kent Kinnear / (Germany) David Prinosil (first round)
8. (Australia) Mark Philippoussis / (Australia) Patrick Rafter (quarterfinals)

== Draw ==
=== Key ===
- Q = Qualifier
- WC = Wild card
- LL = Lucky loser
- Alt = Alternate
- SE = Special exempt
- PR = Protected ranking
- ITF = ITF entry
- JE = Junior exempt
- w/o = Walkover
- r = Retired
- d = Defaulted
- SR = Special ranking

=== Finals ===
Semifinals
(United States) Donald Johnson (United States) Kenny Thorne	3	3
5	(Czech Republic) Petr Korda (Czech Republic) Cyril Suk	6	6
6	(France) Olivier Delaître (United States) Jeff Tarango	3	7	6
2	(Zimbabwe) Byron Black (United States) Jonathan Stark	6	5	2

Final
5	(Czech Republic) Petr Korda (Czech Republic) Cyril Suk	6	3	2
6	(France) Olivier Delaître (United States) Jeff Tarango	4	6	6

=== Top half ===
First round
WC	(Australia) M Draper (Australia) S Draper	7	3	7
(South Africa) M Barnard (South Africa) B Haygarth	6	6	5
(United States) B Barber (United States) J Pugh	5	7	2
(United States) D Johnson (United States) K Thorne	7	6	6
WC	(United States) MV Washington (United States) M Washington	6	3	7
7	(United States) K Kinnear (Germany) D Prinosil	4	6	6
WC	(United States) S Humphries (Venezuela) N Pereira	4	4
Q	(United States) J Gimelstob (Mexico) D Roditi	6	6
(United States) D Pate (South Africa) D Visser	2	6	3
(Germany) P Baur (Sweden) H Holm	6	3	6
(Spain) J Burillo (Hungary) S Noszály	1	6	3
5	(Czech Republic) P Korda (Czech Republic) C Suk	6	3	6

Second round
1	(Canada) G Connell (United States) P Galbraith	6	5	2
WC	(Australia) M Draper (Australia) S Draper	3	7	6
(United States) D Johnson (United States) K Thorne	6	7
WC	(United States) MV Washington (United States) M Washington	2	6
3	(United States) P McEnroe (United States) R Reneberg	6	6
Q	(United States) J Gimelstob (Mexico) D Roditi	4	4
(Germany) P Baur (Sweden) H Holm	1	4
5	(Czech Republic) P Korda (Czech Republic) C Suk	6	6

Quarterfinals
WC	(Australia) M Draper (Australia) S Draper	5	5
(United States) D Johnson (United States) K Thorne	7	7
3	(United States) P McEnroe (United States) R Reneberg	3	7	3
5	(Czech Republic) P Korda (Czech Republic) C Suk	6	6	6

Semifinals
(United States) D Johnson (United States) K Thorne	3	3
5	(Czech Republic) P Korda (Czech Republic) C Suk	6	6

=== Bottom half ===
First round
6	(France) O Delaître (United States) J Tarango	7	7
(United States) S Davis (United States) T Martin	6	5
(Mexico) Ó Ortiz (United States) V Spadea	6	6
(South Africa) D Nainkin (South Africa) G Stafford	3	2
(Sweden) S Edberg (Sweden) T Enqvist	6	6
(Germany) A Mronz (Australia) M Tebbutt	3	4
8	(Australia) M Philippoussis (Australia) P Rafter	6	7
(Australia) P Kilderry (Portugal) N Marques	2	6
(United States) S Cannon (South Africa) M Ondruska	6	5	6
WC	(Netherlands) R Seguso (Netherlands) R Wassen	3	7	2
(France) R Gilbert (Kenya) P Wekesa	6	6	7
Q	(United States) P Goldstein (United States) J Salzenstein	3	7	6

Second round
6	(France) O Delaître (United States) J Tarango	6	6
(Mexico) Ó Ortiz (United States) V Spadea	4	2
(Sweden) S Edberg (Sweden) T Enqvist	3	6
4	(South Africa) D Adams (Czech Republic) M Damm	6	7
8	(Australia) M Philippoussis (Australia) P Rafter	7	6
(United States) S Cannon (South Africa) M Ondruska	6	2
(France) R Gilbert (Kenya) P Wekesa	1	1
2	(Zimbabwe) B Black (United States) J Stark	6	6

Quarterfinals
6	(France) O Delaître (United States) J Tarango	4	6	6
4	(South Africa) D Adams (Czech Republic) M Damm	6	2	2
8	(Australia) M Philippoussis (Australia) P Rafter	7	2	3
2	(Zimbabwe) B Black (United States) J Stark	6	6	6

Semifinals
6	(France) O Delaître (United States) J Tarango	3	7	6
2	(Zimbabwe) B Black (United States) J Stark	6	5	2
