= 1997 Legg Mason Tennis Classic – Singles =

Singles
- 1997 Legg Mason Tennis Classic

Final
- Champion: (United States) Michael Chang
- Runner-up: (Czech Republic) Petr Korda
- Score: 5–7, 6–2, 6–1

Details
- Draw: 56 (7Q / 5WC)
- Seeds: 16

Events
Singles	Doubles
← 1996 ·	Washington Open	· 1998 →

Michael Chang was the defending champion and successfully defended his title, by defeating Petr Korda 5–7, 6–2, 6–1 in the final.

== Seeds ==
The top eight seeds received a bye to the second round.

1. (United States) Michael Chang (champion)
2. (Czech Republic) Petr Korda (final)
3. (United States) Andre Agassi (second round)
4. (United States) Chris Woodruff (second round)
5. (Australia) Jason Stoltenberg (third round)
6. (France) Lionel Roux (second round)
7. (Australia) Scott Draper (quarterfinals)
8. (Germany) Tommy Haas (quarterfinals)
9. (Denmark) Kenneth Carlsen (third round)
10. (Armenia) Sargis Sargsian (first round)
11. (New Zealand) Brett Steven (semifinals)
12. (Italy) Marzio Martelli (second round)
13. (United States) Justin Gimelstob (first round)
14. (United States) Vince Spadea (quarterfinals)
15. (South Africa) Neville Godwin (second round)
16. (Netherlands) Fernon Wibier (third round)

== Draw ==
=== Key ===
- Q = Qualifier
- WC = Wild card
- LL = Lucky loser
- Alt = Alternate
- ITF = ITF entry
- PR = Protected ranking
- SR = Special ranking
- SE = Special exempt
- JE = Junior exempt
- JR = Junior Accelerator Programme entrant
- CO = College Accelerator Programme entrant
- NG = Next Gen Accelerator Program entrant
- w/o = Walkover
- r = Retired
- d = Defaulted

=== Finals ===
Quarterfinals
1	(United States) Michael Chang	6	6
7	(Australia) Scott Draper	2	3
(Germany) Rainer Schüttler	3	3
11	(New Zealand) Brett Steven	6	6
Q	(United States) David Wheaton	6	4	6
14	(United States) Vince Spadea	3	6	2
8	(Germany) Tommy Haas	7^{7}	4	4
2	(Czech Republic) Petr Korda	6^{2}	6	6

Semifinals
1	(United States) Michael Chang	6	7^{7}
11	(New Zealand) Brett Steven	2	6^{4}
Q	(United States) David Wheaton	2	3
2	(Czech Republic) Petr Korda	6	6

Final
1	(United States) Michael Chang	5	6	6
2	(Czech Republic) Petr Korda	7	2	1

=== Top half ===
==== Section 1 ====
First round
(United States) J Grabb	6	1	5
Q	(Mexico) L Herrera	1	6	7
(United States) S Bryan	1	4
(United States) M Joyce	6	6
(Argentina) G Etlis	6	4	4
15	(South Africa) N Godwin	4	6	6
10	(Armenia) S Sargsian	4	3
(United States) S Campbell	6	6
(The Bahamas) M Knowles	4^{r}
(Australia) B Ellwood	5
(France) G Solvès	3	6	6
(United States) T Ho	6	3	1

Second round
1	(United States) M Chang	6	6^{9}	7^{7}
Q	(Mexico) L Herrera	3	7^{11}	6^{5}
(United States) M Joyce	7^{7}	7^{8}
15	(South Africa) N Godwin	6^{4}	6^{6}
(United States) S Campbell	6	4	6
(Australia) B Ellwood	4	6	3
(France) G Solvès	5	1
7	(Australia) S Draper	7	6

Third round
1	(United States) M Chang	4	6	6
(United States) M Joyce	6	1	2
(United States) S Campbell	3	6^{7}
7	(Australia) S Draper	6	7^{9}

Quarterfinals
1	(United States) M Chang	6	6
7	(Australia) S Draper	2	3

==== Section 2 ====
First round
(United States) D Flach	6	6
(Italy) C Caratti	2	2
Q	(United States) R Cordish	6	3	2
Q	(Netherlands) M Hilpert	2	6	6
(Germany) R Schüttler	6	6
13	(United States) J Gimelstob	3	3
11	(New Zealand) B Steven	7^{7}	6
Q	(United States) L Jensen	6^{4}	3
(Israel) E Ran	7^{7}	6^{5}	4
(Russia) A Merinov	6^{0}	7^{7}	6
WC	(Australia) L Smith	7^{7}	7^{9}
Q	(India) M Bhupathi	6^{4}	6^{7}

Second round
3	(United States) A Agassi	6	4	4
(United States) D Flach	2	6	6
Q	(Netherlands) M Hilpert	5	2
(Germany) R Schüttler	7	6
11	(New Zealand) B Steven	6	6
(Russia) A Merinov	0	1
WC	(Australia) L Smith	6	6
6	(France) L Roux	3	3

Third round
(United States) D Flach	6	2	6^{4}
(Germany) R Schüttler	4	6	7^{7}
11	(New Zealand) B Steven	7^{7}	6
WC	(Australia) L Smith	6^{1}	2

Quarterfinals
(Germany) R Schüttler	3	3
11	(New Zealand) B Steven	6	6

=== Bottom half ===
==== Section 3 ====
First round
(United States) O Motevassel	3	7^{7}	1^{r}
(Russia) A Cherkasov	6	6^{5}	2
Q	(United States) D Wheaton	2	6	6
(Brazil) R Jabali	6	3	3
WC	(Croatia) I Ljubičić	6^{3}	5
12	(Italy) M Martelli	7^{7}	7
14	(United States) V Spadea	2	6	6
(France) S Simian	6	1	1
(United States) B Shelton	7^{7}	6
WC	(United States) A Kim	6^{4}	3
Q	(Australia) M Tebbutt	6	6
(Venezuela) N Pereira	2	4

Second round
5	(Australia) J Stoltenberg	6	6
(Russia) A Cherkasov	2	3
Q	(United States) D Wheaton	7^{7}	6
12	(Italy) M Martelli	6^{3}	1
14	(United States) V Spadea	6	6
(United States) B Shelton	4	4
Q	(Australia) M Tebbutt	6	6
4	(United States) C Woodruff	3	3

Third round
5	(Australia) J Stoltenberg	6	6^{2}	6^{1}
Q	(United States) D Wheaton	3	7^{7}	7^{7}
14	(United States) V Spadea	5	7^{7}	6
Q	(Australia) M Tebbutt	7	6^{5}	3

Quarterfinals
Q	(United States) D Wheaton	6	4	6
14	(United States) V Spadea	3	6	2

==== Section 4 ====
First round
(The Bahamas) M Merklein	4	6	6
(United States) J Salzenstein	6	1	3
(Italy) G Pozzi	6	6
(United States) G Grant	1	4
(Philippines) C Mamiit	6^{3}	3
9	(Denmark) K Carlsen	7^{7}	6
16	(Netherlands) F Wibier	7^{7}	7^{7}
WC	(Belarus) M Mirnyi	6^{3}	6^{2}
(Italy) D Scala	6	4	7
WC	(United States) P McEnroe	1	6	5
(South Africa) D Nainkin	6	0	7
(Zimbabwe) K Ullyett	3	6	5

Second round
8	(Germany) T Haas	6	2	6
(The Bahamas) M Merklein	4	6	3
(Italy) G Pozzi	2	0
9	(Denmark) K Carlsen	6	6
16	(Netherlands) F Wibier	7^{8}	6
(Italy) D Scala	6^{6}	4
(South Africa) D Nainkin	4	2
2	(Czech Republic) P Korda	6	6

Third round
8	(Germany) T Haas	6^{6}	6	6
9	(Denmark) K Carlsen	7^{8}	4	4
16	(Netherlands) F Wibier	4	4
2	(Czech Republic) P Korda	6	6

Quarterfinals
8	(Germany) T Haas	7^{7}	4	4
2	(Czech Republic) P Korda	6^{2}	6	6
