= 1998 Legg Mason Tennis Classic – Doubles =

Doubles
- 1998 Legg Mason Tennis Classic

Final
- Champions: (South Africa) Grant Stafford (Zimbabwe) Kevin Ullyett
- Runners-up: (South Africa) Wayne Ferreira (United States) Patrick Galbraith
- Score: 6–2, 6–4

Details
- Draw: 28
- Seeds: 8

Events
Singles	Doubles
← 1997 ·	Washington Open	· 1999 →

== Seeds ==
Champion seeds are indicated in bold text while text in italics indicates the round in which those seeds were eliminated.

1. (South Africa) Wayne Ferreira / (United States) Patrick Galbraith (final)
2. Unknown (withdrew)
3. (Belarus) Max Mirnyi / (Czech Republic) Daniel Vacek (second round)
4. (Australia) David Macpherson / (United States) David Wheaton (quarterfinals)
5. (South Africa) **Grant Stafford** / (Zimbabwe) **Kevin Ullyett (champions)**
6. (United States) Justin Gimelstob / (United States) Jeff Tarango (first round)
7. (Australia) Paul Kilderry / (United States) Kent Kinnear (second round)
8. (Mexico) David Roditi / (Armenia) Sargis Sargsian (first round)

== Draw ==
=== Key ===
- Q = Qualifier
- WC = Wild card
- LL = Lucky loser
- Alt = Alternate
- SE = Special exempt
- PR = Protected ranking
- ITF = ITF entry
- JE = Junior exempt
- w/o = Walkover
- r = Retired
- d = Defaulted
- SR = Special ranking

=== Finals ===
Semifinals
1	(South Africa) **Wayne Ferreira** **(United States) Patrick Galbraith**	**7**	**6**
(The Bahamas) Mark Merklein (United States) Vince Spadea	5	1
5	(South Africa) **Grant Stafford** **(Zimbabwe) Kevin Ullyett**	4	**6**	**6**
(United States) Mike Bryan (United States) Bob Bryan	**6**	3	4

Final
1	(South Africa) Wayne Ferreira (United States) Patrick Galbraith	2	4
5	(South Africa) **Grant Stafford** **(Zimbabwe) Kevin Ullyett**	**6**	**6**

=== Top half ===
First round
(Spain) **Ó Burrieza** **(Japan) M Takada**	**6**	**7**
(Venezuela) M Ruah (Brazil) A Sá	2	6
(Australia) **M Tebbutt** **(Australia) P Tramacchi**	**6**	**6**
(United States) Y Auzoux (United States) P Harsanyi	2	3
(United States) **D Flach** **(United States) G Van Emburgh**	**6**	**6**
8	(Mexico) D Roditi (Armenia) S Sargsian	4	4
(The Bahamas) **M Merklein** **(United States) V Spadea**	**6**	**6**
(Australia) G Doyle (Philippines) E Taino	3	2
(Israel) **E Ran** **(Switzerland) F Veglio**	**7**	4	**7**
(Australia) S Draper (Australia) L Hewitt	6	**6**	5
(Canada) **B Kokavec** **(Mexico) M Osorio**	**6**	**6**
6	(United States) J Gimelstob (United States) J Tarango	3	1

Second round
1	(South Africa) **W Ferreira** **(United States) P Galbraith**	**6**	**6**
(Spain) Ó Burrieza (Japan) M Takada	0	3
(Australia) M Tebbutt (Australia) P Tramacchi	4	2
(United States) **D Flach** **(United States) G Van Emburgh**	**6**	**6**
3	(Belarus) M Mirnyi (Czech Republic) D Vacek	6	3
(The Bahamas) **M Merklein** **(United States) V Spadea**	**7**	**6**
(Israel) E Ran (Switzerland) F Veglio	**6**	1	6
(Canada) **B Kokavec** **(Mexico) M Osorio**	3	**6**	**7**

Quarterfinals
1	(South Africa) **W Ferreira** **(United States) P Galbraith**	4	**6**	**6**
(United States) D Flach (United States) G Van Emburgh	**6**	3	4
(The Bahamas) **M Merklein** **(United States) V Spadea**	**6**	**6**
(Canada) B Kokavec (Mexico) M Osorio	3	4

Semifinals
1	(South Africa) **W Ferreira** **(United States) P Galbraith**	**7**	**6**
(The Bahamas) M Merklein (United States) V Spadea	5	1

=== Bottom half ===
First round
5	(South Africa) **G Stafford** **(Zimbabwe) K Ullyett**	**6**	**6**
(United States) J-M Gambill (United States) T Gambill	3	2
(United States) **P Goldstein** **(United States) S Humphries**	**6**	**6**
(Australia) A Painter (Australia) G Silcock	4	2
(Finland) **T Ketola** **(South Africa) D Nainkin**	**6**	6	**6**
(South Africa) M Ondruska (South Africa) B Talbot	4	**7**	2
7	(Australia) **P Kilderry** **(United States) K Kinnear**	**6**	3	**6**
(South Africa) M Wakefield (South Africa) W Whitehouse	2	**6**	4
(United States) **B Bryan** **(United States) M Bryan**	**6**	**6**
(Mexico) B Martínez (Mexico) Ó Ortiz	3	2
(United States) **D DiLucia** **(United States) M Sell**	**7**	**6**
(Japan) G Motomura (Japan) T Suzuki	6	1

Second round
5	(South Africa) **G Stafford** **(Zimbabwe) K Ullyett**	**6**	**7**
(United States) P Goldstein (United States) S Humphries	3	6
(Finland) T Ketola (South Africa) D Nainkin	5	4
4	(Australia) **D Macpherson** **(United States) D Wheaton**	**7**	**6**
7	(Australia) P Kilderry (United States) K Kinnear	2	6
(United States) **B Bryan** **(United States) M Bryan**	**6**	**7**
(United States) **D DiLucia** **(United States) M Sell**	5	**6**	**6**
(Czech Republic) M Damm (Australia) S Stolle	**7**	3	4

Quarterfinals
5	(South Africa) **G Stafford** **(Zimbabwe) K Ullyett**	**6**	**7**
4	(Australia) D Macpherson (United States) D Wheaton	3	5
(United States) **B Bryan** **(United States) M Bryan**	4	**6**	**6**
(United States) D DiLucia (United States) M Sell	**6**	3	2

Semifinals
5	(South Africa) **G Stafford** **(Zimbabwe) K Ullyett**	4	**6**	**6**
(United States) B Bryan (United States) M Bryan	**6**	3	4
