= 2001 Legg Mason Tennis Classic – Doubles =

Doubles
- 2001 Legg Mason Tennis Classic

Final
- Champions: (Czech Republic) Martin Damm (Germany) David Prinosil
- Runners-up: (United States) Bob Bryan (United States) Mike Bryan
- Score: 7–6^{(7–5)}, 6–3

Details
- Draw: 28
- Seeds: 8

Events
Singles	Doubles
← 2000 ·	Washington Open	· 2002 →

Alex O'Brien and Jared Palmer were the defending champions but only O'Brien competed that year with Justin Gimelstob.

Gimelstob and O'Brien lost in the first round to Marius Barnard and Jim Thomas.

Martin Damm and David Prinosil won in the final 7–6^{(7–5)}, 6–3 against Bob Bryan and Mike Bryan.

== Seeds ==
The top four seeded teams received byes into the second round.

1. (United States) Bob Bryan / (United States) Mike Bryan (final)
2. (Australia) Wayne Arthurs / (Australia) Michael Hill (quarterfinals)
3. (South Africa) David Adams / (United States) Jeff Tarango (semifinals)
4. (Zimbabwe) Wayne Black / (Zimbabwe) Kevin Ullyett (semifinals)
5. (Argentina) Martín García / (Czech Republic) Cyril Suk (first round)
6. (Slovakia) Dominik Hrbatý / (United States) Scott Humphries (first round)
7. (United States) Justin Gimelstob / (United States) Alex O'Brien (first round)
8. (Japan) Thomas Shimada / (South Africa) Myles Wakefield (quarterfinals)

== Draw ==
=== Key ===
- Q = Qualifier
- WC = Wild card
- LL = Lucky loser
- Alt = Alternate
- SE = Special exempt
- PR = Protected ranking
- ITF = ITF entry
- JE = Junior exempt
- w/o = Walkover
- r = Retired
- d = Defaulted
- SR = Special ranking

=== Final ===
Semifinals

Final

1
- (United States) Bob Bryan
- (United States) Mike Bryan
7
6

3
- (South Africa) David Adams
- (United States) Jeff Tarango
5
4

1
- (United States) Bob Bryan
- (United States) Mike Bryan
6^{5}
3

- (Czech Republic) Martin Damm
- (Germany) David Prinosil
7^{7}
6

4
- (Zimbabwe) Wayne Black
- (Zimbabwe) Kevin Ullyett
5
5

- (Czech Republic) Martin Damm
- (Germany) David Prinosil
7
7

=== Top half ===
First round

Second round

Quarterfinals

Semifinals

1
- (United States) B Bryan
- (United States) M Bryan
7
6

WC
- (Paraguay) R Delgado
- (Thailand) P Srichaphan
1
3

- (Argentina) L Arnold
- (Argentina) L Lobo
5
4

- (Argentina) L Arnold
- (Argentina) L Lobo
6
6

1
- (United States) B Bryan
- (United States) M Bryan
6
4
6

- (France) J Boutter
- (Australia) P Kilderry
3
4

8
- (Japan) T Shimada
- (South Africa) M Wakefield
2
6
3

- (Netherlands) S Schalken
- (Czech Republic) D Vacek
6
6

- (Netherlands) S Schalken
- (Czech Republic) D Vacek
7^{7}
4
6^{1}

WC
- (United States) L Jensen
- (United States) M Jensen
3
0

8
- (Japan) T Shimada
- (South Africa) M Wakefield
6^{3}
6
7^{7}

8
- (Japan) T Shimada
- (South Africa) M Wakefield
6
6

1
- (United States) B Bryan
- (United States) M Bryan
7
6

3
- (South Africa) D Adams
- (United States) J Tarango
5
4

3
- (South Africa) D Adams
- (United States) J Tarango
6^{4}
6
6

WC
- (United States) A Roddick
- (United States) J Roddick
4
7
6

WC
- (United States) A Roddick
- (United States) J Roddick
7^{7}
4
4

- (Argentina) G Cañas
- (Argentina) D Orsanic
6
5
4

3
- (South Africa) D Adams
- (United States) J Tarango
7
5

- (South Africa) G Stafford
- (South Africa) J Weir-Smith
6
1
4

- (Russia) A Olhovskiy
- (France) F Santoro
5
3^{r}

- (Russia) A Olhovskiy
- (France) F Santoro
1
6
6

- (Russia) A Olhovskiy
- (France) F Santoro
w/o

- (Spain) À Corretja
- (Ecuador) N Lapentti
7
6

- (Spain) À Corretja
- (Ecuador) N Lapentti

5
- (Argentina) M García
- (Czech Republic) C Suk
5
3

=== Bottom half ===
First round

Second round

Quarterfinals

Semifinals

7
- (United States) J Gimelstob
- (United States) A O'Brien
2
2

- (South Africa) M Barnard
- (United States) J Thomas
6
6

- (South Africa) M Barnard
- (United States) J Thomas
6
6

- (Argentina) P Albano
- (Germany) M-K Goellner
6
6^{2}
6

- (Argentina) P Albano
- (Germany) M-K Goellner
3
4

- (South Africa) N Godwin
- (The Bahamas) M Merklein
2
7^{7}
2

- (South Africa) M Barnard
- (United States) J Thomas
6^{5}
1

WC
- (United States) C Clark
- (United States) T Spracklin
6
6

4
- (Zimbabwe) W Black
- (Zimbabwe) K Ullyett
7^{7}
6

WC
- (United States) J-M Gambill
- (United States) T Gambill
2
4

WC
- (United States) C Clark
- (United States) T Spracklin
3
6^{3}

4
- (Zimbabwe) W Black
- (Zimbabwe) K Ullyett
6
7^{7}

4
- (Zimbabwe) W Black
- (Zimbabwe) K Ullyett
5
5

6
- (Slovakia) D Hrbatý
- (United States) S Humphries
3
6
3

- (Czech Republic) M Damm
- (Germany) D Prinosil
7
7

- (Australia) P Hanley
- (Australia) N Healey
6
4
6

- (Australia) P Hanley
- (Australia) N Healey
3
6^{8}

WC
- (United States) Paul Goldstein
- (Germany) N Kiefer
6
4
6^{8}

- (Czech Republic) M Damm
- (Germany) D Prinosil
6
7^{10}

- (Czech Republic) M Damm
- (Germany) D Prinosil
3
6
7^{10}

- (Czech Republic) M Damm
- (Germany) D Prinosil
6
4
7^{7}

- (South Africa) J Coetzee
- (South Africa) B Haygarth
6
7^{8}

2
- (Australia) W Arthurs
- (Australia) M Hill
2
6
6^{2}

- (Zimbabwe) B Black
- (United States) J Stark
4
6^{6}

- (South Africa) J Coetzee
- (South Africa) B Haygarth
5
3

2
- (Australia) W Arthurs
- (Australia) M Hill
7
6
