= 1997 Legg Mason Tennis Classic =

- Date: July 14–20
- Edition: 28th
- Category: Championships Series
- Draw: 56S / 28D
- Prize money: $550,000
- Surface: Hard / outdoor
- Location: Washington, D.C., United States

Champions

Singles
- (United States) Michael Chang

Doubles
- (United States) Luke Jensen / (United States) Murphy Jensen
← 1996 ·	Washington Open	· 1998 →

The 1997 Legg Mason Tennis Classic was a men's tennis tournament played on outdoor hard courts in Washington, D.C., United States, that was part of the Championship Series of the 1997 ATP Tour. It was the 28th edition of the tournament and was held from July 14 through July 20, 1997. First-seeded Michael Chang won the singles title and $90,000 first-prize money.

== Finals ==
=== Singles ===
(United States) Michael Chang defeated (Czechoslovakia) Petr Korda 5–7, 6–2, 6–1

=== Doubles ===
(United States) Luke Jensen / (United States) Murphy Jensen defeated (South Africa) Neville Godwin / (Netherlands) Fernon Wibier 6–4, 6–4
