= 2000 Legg Mason Tennis Classic – Doubles =

Doubles
- 2000 Legg Mason Tennis Classic

Final
- Champions: (United States) Alex O'Brien (United States) Jared Palmer
- Runners-up: (United States) Andre Agassi (Armenia) Sargis Sargsian
- Score: 7–5, 6–1

Details
- Draw: 28
- Seeds: 8

Events
Singles	Doubles
← 1999 ·	Washington Open	· 2001 →

Justin Gimelstob and Sébastien Lareau were the defending champions, but none competed this year.

Alex O'Brien and Jared Palmer won the title by defeating Andre Agassi and Sargis Sargsian 7–5, 6–1 in the final.

== Seeds ==
The top four seeds receive a bye into the second round.

1. (United States) Alex O'Brien / (United States) Jared Palmer (champions)
2. (United States) Donald Johnson / (South Africa) Piet Norval (quarterfinals)
3. (Czech Republic) Martin Damm / (Slovakia) Dominik Hrbatý (second round)
4. (Zimbabwe) Byron Black / (United States) Scott Humphries (second round)
5. (Russia) Andrei Olhovskiy / (Germany) David Prinosil (first round)
6. (Australia) Wayne Arthurs / (Federal Republic of Yugoslavia) Nenad Zimonjić (semifinals)
7. (Sweden) Peter Nyborg / (Czech Republic) Cyril Suk (first round, retired due to a back injury on Nyborg)
8. (South Africa) Chris Haggard / (Belgium) Tom Vanhoudt (first round)

== Draw ==
=== Key ===
- Q = Qualifier
- WC = Wild card
- LL = Lucky loser
- Alt = Alternate
- SE = Special exempt
- PR = Protected ranking
- ITF = ITF entry
- JE = Junior exempt
- w/o = Walkover
- r = Retired
- d = Defaulted
- SR = Special ranking

=== Finals ===
Semifinals
1	(United States) Alex O'Brien (United States) Jared Palmer	1	6	6
6	(Australia) Wayne Arthurs (Federal Republic of Yugoslavia) Nenad Zimonjić	6	3	4
(Japan) Thomas Shimada (South Africa) Myles Wakefield	4	6^{4}
WC	(United States) Andre Agassi (Armenia) Sargis Sargsian	6	7^{7}

Final
1	(United States) Alex O'Brien (United States) Jared Palmer	7	6
WC	(United States) Andre Agassi (Armenia) Sargis Sargsian	5	1

=== Top half ===
First round
(Czech Republic) P Kovačka (Czech Republic) P Kudrnáč	6^{5}	6	3
(South Africa) J Coetzee (South Africa) B Haygarth	7^{7}	2	6
(South Africa) M Ondruska (United States) M Sprengelmeyer	7^{7}	3	6
(South Africa) P Rosner (South Africa) J Weir-Smith	6^{5}	6	3
Q	(Argentina) G Coria (Chile) F González	7	6
8	(South Africa) C Haggard (Belgium) T Vanhoudt	5	1
(United States) B Bryan (United States) M Bryan	6	6
(United States) D Bowen (United States) J Thomas	1	4
(United States) P Goldstein (United States) C Woodruff	4	6	3
(Brazil) A Prieto (Brazil) A Simoni	6	3	6
WC	(United States) P Harsanyi (United States) P Osuna	2	3
6	(Australia) W Arthurs (Federal Republic of Yugoslavia) N Zimonjić	6	6

Second round
1	(United States) A O'Brien (United States) J Palmer	7	6
(South Africa) J Coetzee (South Africa) B Haygarth	5	3
(South Africa) M Ondruska (United States) M Sprengelmeyer	6	7^{7}
Q	(Argentina) G Coria (Chile) F González	3	6^{4}
4	(Zimbabwe) B Black (United States) S Humphries	6	4	2
(United States) B Bryan (United States) M Bryan	1	6	6
(Brazil) A Prieto (Brazil) A Simoni	1	6^{2}
6	(Australia) W Arthurs (Federal Republic of Yugoslavia) N Zimonjić	6	7^{7}

Quarterfinals
1	(United States) A O'Brien (United States) J Palmer	6^{4}	6	6
(South Africa) M Ondruska (United States) M Sprengelmeyer	7^{7}	2	1
(United States) B Bryan (United States) M Bryan	3	6^{5}
6	(Australia) W Arthurs (Federal Republic of Yugoslavia) N Zimonjić	6	7^{7}

Semifinals
1	(United States) A O'Brien (United States) J Palmer	1	6	6
6	(Australia) W Arthurs (Federal Republic of Yugoslavia) N Zimonjić	6	3	4

=== Bottom half ===
First round
5	(Russia) A Olhovskiy (Germany) D Prinosil	3	4
(Japan) T Shimada (South Africa) M Wakefield	6	6
WC	(United States) L Harper-Griffith (United States) A Roddick	7^{7}	2	7
(United States) B Coupe (United States) J Williams	6^{5}	6	5
WC	(Spain) À Corretja (Germany) N Kiefer	7	6
Q	(France) J Golmard (Germany) R Schüttler	5	3
7	(Sweden) P Nyborg (Czech Republic) C Suk	5^{r}
WC	(United States) A Agassi (Armenia) S Sargsian	4
(Canada) J Robichaud (United Kingdom) K Spencer	6^{7}	5
(Italy) A Gaudenzi (Croatia) I Ljubičić	7^{9}	7
(France) J Boutter (France) F Santoro	1	6	4
(Germany) L Burgsmüller (Israel) E Ran	6	3	6

Second round
(Japan) T Shimada (South Africa) M Wakefield	6	5	6
WC	(United States) L Harper-Griffith (United States) A Roddick	4	7	4
WC	(Spain) À Corretja (Germany) N Kiefer	1	6	6
3	(Czech Republic) M Damm (Slovakia) D Hrbatý	6	2	2
WC	(United States) A Agassi (Armenia) S Sargsian	w/o
(Italy) A Gaudenzi (Croatia) I Ljubičić
(Germany) L Burgsmüller (Israel) E Ran	6	2	6^{2}
2	(United States) D Johnson (South Africa) P Norval	4	6	7^{7}

Quarterfinals
(Japan) T Shimada (South Africa) M Wakefield	w/o
WC	(Spain) À Corretja (Germany) N Kiefer
WC	(United States) A Agassi (Armenia) S Sargsian	1	6	6
2	(United States) D Johnson (South Africa) P Norval	6	3	3

Semifinals
(Japan) T Shimada (South Africa) M Wakefield	4	6^{4}
WC	(United States) A Agassi (Armenia) S Sargsian	6	7^{7}
