= 2001 Legg Mason Tennis Classic – Singles =

Singles
- 2001 Legg Mason Tennis Classic

Final
- Champion: (United States) Andy Roddick
- Runner-up: (Netherlands) Sjeng Schalken
- Score: 6–2, 6–3

Details
- Draw: 56 (7Q / 4WC)
- Seeds: 16

Events
| Singles | Doubles |
- Washington Open

Àlex Corretja was the defending champion but lost in the third round to Marcelo Ríos.

Andy Roddick won in the final 6–2, 6–3 against Sjeng Schalken.

== Seeds ==
The top eight seeds received a bye to the second round.

1. (United States) Andre Agassi (semifinals)
2. (Spain) Àlex Corretja (third round)
3. (Germany) Tommy Haas (third round)
4. (France) Fabrice Santoro (quarterfinals)
5. (Slovakia) Dominik Hrbatý (third round)
6. (United States) Jan-Michael Gambill (third round)
7. (Ecuador) Nicolás Lapentti (third round)
8. (Germany) Nicolas Kiefer (second round)
9. (United States) Andy Roddick (champion)
10. (Netherlands) Sjeng Schalken (final)
11. (Argentina) Guillermo Cañas (third round)
12. (United Kingdom) Greg Rusedski (quarterfinals)
13. (Spain) Alberto Martín (first round)
14. (Spain) Galo Blanco (first round)
15. (Spain) Fernando Vicente (third round)
16. (France) Jérôme Golmard (quarterfinals)

== Draw ==
Key

- Q = Qualifier
- WC = Wild card
- LL = Lucky loser
- Alt = Alternate
- ITF = ITF entry
- PR = Protected ranking
- SR = Special ranking
- SE = Special exempt
- JE = Junior exempt
- JR = Junior Accelerator Programme entrant
- CO = College Accelerator Programme entrant
- NG = Next Gen Accelerator Program entrant
- w/o = Walkover
- r = Retired
- d = Defaulted

=== Finals ===
Semifinals
1 | (United States) Andre Agassi | 6 | 4 | 4
10 | (Netherlands) Sjeng Schalken | 3 | 6 | 6
(United States) Michael Chang | 4 | 3
9 | (United States) Andy Roddick | 6 | 6

Final
10 | (Netherlands) Sjeng Schalken | 2 | 3
9 | (United States) Andy Roddick | 6 | 6

=== Top half ===
==== Section 1 ====
First round
WC | (United States) Z Fleishman | 6^{2} | 1
Q | (Zimbabwe) W Black | 7^{7} | 6
(Netherlands) P Wessels | 7^{7} | 6
(Italy) G Pozzi | 6^{3} | 4
LL | (United Kingdom) J Delgado | 4 | 6^{7}
15 | (Spain) F Vicente | 6 | 7^{9}
12 | (United Kingdom) G Rusedski | 6 | 7^{7}
(Austria) M Hipfl | 1 | 6^{2}
(Germany) L Burgsmüller | 3 | 7^{9} | 3
(France) J Boutter | 6 | 6^{7} | 6
WC | (United States) A Kim | 3 | 6 | 6
Q | (United States) A O'Brien | 6 | 2 | 4

Second round
1 | (United States) A Agassi | 6 | 6
Q | (Zimbabwe) W Black | 3 | 4
(Netherlands) P Wessels | 6 | 4 | 6^{4}
15 | (Spain) F Vicente | 4 | 6 | 7^{7}
12 | (United Kingdom) G Rusedski | 6 | 7^{7}
(France) J Boutter | 4 | 6^{2}
WC | (United States) A Kim | 0 | 1
7 | (Ecuador) N Lapentti | 6 | 6

Third round
1 | (United States) A Agassi | 6 | 6
15 | (Spain) F Vicente | 2 | 2
12 | (United Kingdom) G Rusedski | 7^{8} | 6
7 | (Ecuador) N Lapentti | 6^{6} | 3

Quarterfinals
1 | (United States) A Agassi | 3 | 7^{8} | 7^{10}
12 | (United Kingdom) G Rusedski | 6 | 6^{6} | 6^{8}

==== Section 2 ====
First round
Q | (Czech Republic) T Zíb | 6 | 7
(Italy) D Sanguinetti | 3 | 5
Q | (United States) M Bryan | 6 | 6
WC | (United States) P Harsanyi | 1 | 2
WC | (United States) B Bryan | 2 | 5
16 | (France) J Golmard | 6 | 7
10 | (Netherlands) S Schalken | 6 | 7^{7}
(Italy) F Luzzi | 3 | 6^{4}
(Russia) N Davydenko | 4 | 6 | 6
(Germany) R Schüttler | 6 | 3 | 0
(Spain) F Mantilla | 3 | 6 | 6
(Russia) A Stoliarov | 6 | 1 | 2

Second round
3 | (Germany) T Haas | 6 | 6
Q | (Czech Republic) T Zíb | 3 | 2
Q | (United States) M Bryan | 5 | 2
16 | (France) J Golmard | 7 | 6
10 | (Netherlands) S Schalken | 6 | 6
(Russia) N Davydenko | 3 | 1
(Spain) F Mantilla | 3 | 1
6 | (United States) J-M Gambill | 6 | 6

Third round
3 | (Germany) T Haas | 4 | 4
16 | (France) J Golmard | 6 | 6
10 | (Netherlands) S Schalken | w/o
6 | (United States) J-M Gambill

Quarterfinals
16 | (France) J Golmard | 6 | 4 | 2
10 | (Netherlands) S Schalken | 4 | 6 | 6

=== Bottom half ===
==== Section 3 ====
First round
(United States) M Chang | 7^{9} | 6
(Zimbabwe) B Black | 6^{7} | 1
(United States) C Mamiit | 6 | 6
(United States) J Gimelstob | 3 | 2
(United States) P Goldstein | 4 | 7^{7} | 1
11 | (Argentina) G Cañas | 6 | 6^{5} | 6
13 | (Spain) A Martín | 4 | 6 | 5
LL | (Paraguay) R Delgado | 6 | 4 | 7
Q | (United States) J Salzenstein | 4 | 5
(Spain) J Díaz | 6 | 7
(Denmark) K Carlsen | 6 | 6
(Italy) A Gaudenzi | 2 | 4

Second round
8 | (Germany) N Kiefer | 6 | 3 | 2
(United States) M Chang | 3 | 6 | 6
(United States) C Mamiit | 6 | 1 | 1
11 | (Argentina) G Cañas | 3 | 6 | 6
LL | (Paraguay) R Delgado | 7 | 4 | 6
(Spain) J Díaz | 5 | 6 | 3
(Denmark) K Carlsen | 2 | 5
4 | (France) F Santoro | 6 | 7

Third round
(United States) M Chang | 7 | 2 | 6
11 | (Argentina) G Cañas | 5 | 6 | 4
LL | (Paraguay) R Delgado | 3 | 5
4 | (France) F Santoro | 6 | 7

Quarterfinals
(United States) M Chang | 6 | 6
4 | (France) F Santoro | 2 | 4

==== Section 4 ====
First round
(France) A Dupuis | 7^{7} | 6
(Germany) D Prinosil | 6^{5} | 4
(Thailand) P Srichaphan | 7^{7} | 6
Q | (United States) K Capalik | 6^{1} | 4
(Australia) W Arthurs | 3 | 7 | 6^{4}
9 | (United States) A Roddick | 6 | 5 | 7^{7}
14 | (Spain) G Blanco | 6^{4} | 7^{8} | 3
Q | (United States) M Joyce | 7^{7} | 6^{6} | 6
(South Korea) H-T Lee | 4 | 5
(Chile) M Ríos | 6 | 7
(United Kingdom) M Lee | 4 | 6^{2}
(Chile) N Massú | 6 | 7^{7}

Second round
5 | (Slovakia) D Hrbatý | 7^{7} | 5 | 6
(France) A Dupuis | 6^{5} | 7 | 2
(Thailand) P Srichaphan | 6^{2} | 3
9 | (United States) A Roddick | 7^{7} | 6
Q | (United States) M Joyce | 2 | 2
(Chile) M Ríos | 6 | 6
(Chile) N Massú | 6 | 0 | 3
2 | (Spain) À Corretja | 4 | 6 | 6

Third round
5 | (Slovakia) D Hrbatý | 2 | 5
9 | (United States) A Roddick | 6 | 7
(Chile) M Ríos | 7^{7} | 6
2 | (Spain) À Corretja | 6^{2} | 3

Quarterfinals
9 | (United States) A Roddick | 6 | 6
(Chile) M Ríos | 3 | 4
