= 1999 Legg Mason Tennis Classic =

- Date: August 16–22
- Edition: 30th
- Draw: 56S / 28D
- Prize money: $600,000
- Surface: Hard / outdoor
- Location: Washington, D.C., US
- Venue: William H.G. FitzGerald Tennis Center

Champions

Singles
- (United States) Andre Agassi

Doubles
- (United States) Justin Gimelstob / (Canada) Sébastien Lareau
← 1998 ·	Washington Open	· 2000 →

The 1999 Legg Mason Tenis Classic was the 30th edition of this tennis tournament and was played on outdoor hard courts. The tournament was part of the International Series of the 1999 ATP Tour. It was held at the William H.G. FitzGerald Tennis Center in Washington, D.C. from August 16 through August 22, 1999.

== Finals ==
=== Singles ===
(United States) Andre Agassi defeated (Russia) Yevgeny Kafelnikov, 7–6^{(7–3)}, 6–1

- It was Agassi's 3rd title of the year and the 42nd of his career. It was his 5th title at the event, also winning in 1990, 1991, 1995 and 1998.

=== Doubles ===
(United States) Justin Gimelstob / (Canada) Sébastien Lareau defeated (South Africa) David Adams / (South Africa) John-Laffnie de Jager, 7–5, 6–7^{(2–7)}, 6–3
