= 2000 Legg Mason Tennis Classic – Singles =

Singles
- 2000 Legg Mason Tennis Classic

Final
- Champion: (Spain) Àlex Corretja
- Runner-up: (United States) Andre Agassi
- Score: 6–2, 6–3

Details
- Draw: 56 (7Q / 5WC)
- Seeds: 16

Events
| Singles | Doubles |
- Washington Open

Andre Agassi was the defending champion, but lost in the final to Àlex Corretja, 2–6, 3–6.

== Seeds ==
The top eight seeds receive a bye into the second round.

1. (United States) Andre Agassi (final)
2. (Spain) Àlex Corretja (champion)
3. (Germany) Nicolas Kiefer (semifinals)
4. (Australia) Mark Philippoussis (second round)
5. (United States) Jan-Michael Gambill (quarterfinals)
6. (Zimbabwe) Byron Black (quarterfinals)
7. (Slovakia) Dominik Hrbatý (second round)
8. (France) Fabrice Santoro (second round)
9. (Slovakia) Karol Kučera (third round)
10. (France) Jérôme Golmard (third round)
11. (Australia) Andrew Ilie (second round)
12. (Germany) Rainer Schüttler (first round)
13. (United States) Chris Woodruff (first round)
14. (Germany) David Prinosil (semifinals)
15. (Australia) Jason Stoltenberg (first round)
16. (United States) Paul Goldstein (third round)

== Draw ==
Key

- Q = Qualifier
- WC = Wild card
- LL = Lucky loser
- Alt = Alternate
- ITF = ITF entry
- PR = Protected ranking
- SR = Special ranking
- SE = Special exempt
- JE = Junior exempt
- JR = Junior Accelerator Programme entrant
- CO = College Accelerator Programme entrant
- NG = Next Gen Accelerator Program entrant
- w/o = Walkover
- r = Retired
- d = Defaulted

=== Finals ===
Quarterfinals
1 | (United States) Andre Agassi | 6 | 6
WC | (United States) Andy Roddick | 4 | 4
14 | (Germany) David Prinosil | 6 | 1 | 6
6 | (Zimbabwe) Byron Black | 3 | 6 | 3
5 | (United States) Jan-Michael Gambill | 6 | 4 | 2
3 | (Germany) Nicolas Kiefer | 4 | 6 | 6
(Australia) Wayne Arthurs | 6^{5} | 6 | 3
2 | (Spain) Àlex Corretja | 7^{7} | 3 | 6

Semifinals
1 | (United States) Andre Agassi | 6 | 6
14 | (Germany) David Prinosil | 1 | 3
3 | (Germany) Nicolas Kiefer | 6^{2} | 2
2 | (Spain) Àlex Corretja | 7^{7} | 6

Final
1 | (United States) Andre Agassi | 2 | 3
2 | (Spain) Àlex Corretja | 6 | 6

=== Top half ===
==== Section 1 ====
First round
(Costa Rica) JA Marín | 7^{8} | 0 | 1
(Brazil) F Meligeni | 6^{6} | 6 | 6
(Czech Republic) J Vaněk | 6 | 6
Q | (Germany) L Burgsmüller | 4 | 4
(France) J Boutter | 2 | 6 | 3
16 | (United States) P Goldstein | 6 | 3 | 6
9 | (Slovakia) K Kučera | 6 | 6
WC | (United States) P Harsanyi | 1 | 0
Q | (United States) M Russell | 6 | 3 | 2
Q | (United States) K Capalik | 1 | 6 | 6
(Romania) A Voinea | 3 | 4
WC | (United States) A Roddick | 6 | 6

Second round
1 | (United States) A Agassi | 6 | 6
(Brazil) F Meligeni | 2 | 1
(Czech Republic) J Vaněk | 2 | 6 | 4
16 | (United States) P Goldstein | 6 | 3 | 6
9 | (Slovakia) K Kučera | 3 | 7 | 6
Q | (United States) K Capalik | 6 | 5 | 3
WC | (United States) A Roddick | 4 | 6 | 6
8 | (France) F Santoro | 6 | 3 | 3

Third round
1 | (United States) A Agassi | 6 | 6
16 | (United States) P Goldstein | 3 | 2
9 | (Slovakia) K Kučera | 6^{5} | 1
WC | (United States) A Roddick | 7^{7} | 6

Quarterfinals
1 | (United States) A Agassi | 6 | 6
WC | (United States) A Roddick | 4 | 4

==== Section 2 ====
First round
(Brazil) A Sá | 6 | 6
(United Kingdom) A Parmar | 1 | 2
(Italy) L Tieleman | 6 | 6
(Czech Republic) B Ulihrach | 2 | 3
(Czech Republic) M Damm | 3 | 3
14 | (Germany) D Prinosil | 6 | 6
12 | (Germany) R Schüttler | 4 | 4
(Italy) A Gaudenzi | 6 | 6
(France) S Huet | 2 | 3
(Croatia) I Ljubičić | 6 | 6
(Hungary) A Sávolt | 3 | 2
(Italy) D Sanguinetti | 6 | 6

Second round
4 | (Australia) M Philippoussis | 1 | 6^{10}
(Brazil) A Sá | 6 | 7^{12}
(Italy) L Tieleman | 1 | 7 | 3
14 | (Germany) D Prinosil | 6 | 5 | 6
(Italy) A Gaudenzi | 5 | 3
(Croatia) I Ljubičić | 7 | 6
(Italy) D Sanguinetti | 3 | 4
6 | (Zimbabwe) B Black | 6 | 6

Third round
(Brazil) A Sá | 3 | 6 | 3
14 | (Germany) D Prinosil | 6 | 3 | 6
(Croatia) I Ljubičić | 1 | 3
6 | (Zimbabwe) B Black | 6 | 6

Quarterfinals
14 | (Germany) D Prinosil | 6 | 1 | 6
6 | (Zimbabwe) B Black | 3 | 6 | 3

=== Bottom half ===
==== Section 3 ====
First round
(South Africa) M Ondruska | 7^{7} | 4 | 3
Q | (United States) A O'Brien | 6^{3} | 6 | 6
WC | (United States) B Bryan | 6 | 3 | 4
(Belgium) C Rochus | 3 | 6 | 6
(Haiti) R Agénor | 6 | 4 | 4
11 | (Australia) A Ilie | 3 | 6 | 6
13 | (United States) C Woodruff | 4 | 6 | 3
(Chile) F González | 6 | 1 | 6
(Armenia) S Sargsian | 5 | 7^{7} | 4
(Switzerland) L Manta | 7 | 6^{2} | 6
(Switzerland) G Bastl | 3 | 6^{5}
WC | (Argentina) G Coria | 6 | 7^{7}

Second round
5 | (United States) J-M Gambill | 6 | 5 | 7
Q | (United States) A O'Brien | 3 | 7 | 5
(Belgium) C Rochus | 6 | 3 | 6
11 | (Australia) A Ilie | 4 | 6 | 4
(Chile) F González | 3 | 6 | 4
(Switzerland) L Manta | 6 | 2 | 6
WC | (Argentina) G Coria | 6 | 3 | 2
3 | (Germany) N Kiefer | 4 | 6 | 6

Third round
5 | (United States) J-M Gambill | 6 | 6
(Belgium) C Rochus | 0 | 1
(Switzerland) L Manta | 7 | 4 | 4
3 | (Germany) N Kiefer | 5 | 6 | 6

Quarterfinals
5 | (United States) J-M Gambill | 6 | 4 | 2
3 | (Germany) N Kiefer | 4 | 6 | 6

==== Section 4 ====
First round
Q | (United States) M Washington | 0 | 1
(Australia) W Arthurs | 6 | 6
WC | (United States) M Bryan | 5 | 7^{7} | 1
(Spain) G Blanco | 7 | 6^{4} | 6
(Slovakia) J Krošlák | 4 | 2
10 | (France) J Golmard | 6 | 6
15 | (Australia) J Stoltenberg | 4 | 4
(Thailand) P Srichaphan | 6 | 6
LL | (Switzerland) I Heuberger | 7^{7} | 2 | 4
Q | (United Kingdom) B Cowan | 6^{3} | 6 | 6
Q | (United States) D Caldwell | 3 | 6 | 3
(United States) K Kim | 6 | 4 | 6

Second round
7 | (Slovakia) D Hrbatý | 6 | 4 | 3
(Australia) W Arthurs | 4 | 6 | 6
(Spain) G Blanco | 5 | 3
10 | (France) J Golmard | 7 | 6
(Thailand) P Srichaphan | 6 | 6
Q | (United Kingdom) B Cowan | 4 | 1
(United States) K Kim | 5 | 3
2 | (Spain) À Corretja | 7 | 6

Third round
(Australia) W Arthurs | 6 | 6
10 | (France) J Golmard | 3 | 2
(Thailand) P Srichaphan | 3 | 1
2 | (Spain) À Corretja | 6 | 6

Quarterfinals
(Australia) W Arthurs | 6^{5} | 6 | 3
2 | (Spain) À Corretja | 7^{7} | 3 | 6
