= 1998 Legg Mason Tennis Classic – Singles =

Singles
- 1998 Legg Mason Tennis Classic

Final
- Champion: (United States) Andre Agassi
- Runner-up: (Australia) Scott Draper
- Score: 6–2, 6–0

Details
- Draw: 56
- Seeds: 16

Events
Singles	Doubles
← 1997 ·	Washington Open	· 1999 →

The 1998 Legg Mason Tennis Classic was a men's tennis tournament played on outdoor hard courts in Washington, D.C., United States, that was part of the International Series Gold of the 1998 ATP Tour. It was the twenty-ninth edition of the tournament and was held 20 July – 26 July.

== Seeds ==
Champion seeds are indicated in bold text while text in italics indicates the round in which those seeds were eliminated.

1. (United States) Michael Chang (semifinals)
2. (United States) **Andre Agassi (champion)**
3. (South Africa) Wayne Ferreira (semifinals)
4. (Zimbabwe) Byron Black (third round)
5. (Belgium) Scott Draper (quarterfinals)
6. (United States) Vince Spadea (quarterfinals)
7. (United States) Jim Courier (quarterfinals)
8. (Netherlands) Sjeng Schalken (second round)
9. (United States) Jeff Tarango (second round)
10. (Australia) Andrew Ilie (second round)
11. (Italy) Gianluca Pozzi (third round)
12. (United States) Jan-Michael Gambill (first round)
13. (Denmark) Kenneth Carlsen (first round)
14. (Australia) Scott Draper (final)
15. (Czech Republic) Martin Damm (third round)
16. (Czech Republic) Daniel Vacek (first round)

== Draw ==
=== Key ===
- Q = Qualifier
- WC = Wild card
- LL = Lucky loser
- Alt = Alternate
- SE = Special exempt
- PR = Protected ranking
- ITF = ITF entry
- JE = Junior exempt
- w/o = Walkover
- r = Retired
- d = Defaulted
- SR = Special ranking

=== Finals ===
Semifinals
1	(United States) Michael Chang	w/o
14	**(Australia) Scott Draper**
3	(South Africa) Wayne Ferreira	1	0
2	**(United States) Andre Agassi**	**6**	**6**

Final
14	(Australia) Scott Draper	2	0
2	**(United States) Andre Agassi**	**6**	**6**

=== Top half ===
==== Section 1 ====
First round
**(United States) M Sell**	**7**	**6**
(United States) B Bryan	6	0
**(Germany) L Burgsmüller**	**7**	**6**
(Italy) C Caratti	6	1
15	**(Czech Republic) M Damm**	**6**	**7**
(Argentina) G Cañas	4	6
10	**(Australia) A Ilie**	**6**	5	**6**
(Switzerland) I Heuberger	4	**7**	3
**(United States) J Gimelstob**	**6**	2	**6**
(Australia) L Hewitt	3	**6**	2
**(South Africa) M Ondruska**	**6**	**6**
(Israel) E Ran	4	0

Second round
1	**(United States) M Chang**	**6**	**6**
(United States) M Sell	2	3
(Germany) L Burgsmüller	2	4
15	**(Czech Republic) M Damm**	**6**	**6**
10	(Australia) A Ilie	**7**	3	1
**(United States) J Gimelstob**	6	**6**	**6**
(South Africa) M Ondruska	6	6
7	**(United States) J Courier**	**7**	**7**

Third round
1	**(United States) M Chang**	**6**	**6**
15	(Czech Republic) M Damm	4	1
(United States) J Gimelstob	3	4
7	**(United States) J Courier**	**6**	**6**

Quarterfinals
1	**(United States) M Chang**	**6**	**6**
7	(United States) J Courier	3	4

==== Section 2 ====
First round
**(South Africa) G Stafford**	**6**	3	**6**
(Australia) M Tebbutt	4	**6**	3
**(Zimbabwe) W Black**	**6**	**6**
(Netherlands) J van Lottum	3	3
14	**(Australia) S Draper**	**6**	3	**6**
(Mexico) A Hernández	3	**6**	4
11	**(Italy) G Pozzi**	4	**6**	**6**
(Spain) Ó Burrieza	**6**	4	0
**(Brazil) A Sá**	**7**	**6**
(Finland) T Ketola	6	4
**(Armenia) S Sargsian**	3	**6**	**7**
(United States) P Goldstein	**6**	4	5

Second round
4	**(Zimbabwe) B Black**	4	**6**	**6**
(South Africa) G Stafford	**6**	1	0
(Zimbabwe) W Black	**6**	3	6
14	**(Australia) S Draper**	4	**6**	**7**
11	**(Italy) G Pozzi**	**7**	**6**
(Brazil) A Sá	6	;1
(Armenia) S Sargsian	6	1
5	**(Belgium) F Dewulf**	**7**	**6**

Third round
4	(Zimbabwe) B Black	2	4
14	**(Australia) S Draper**	**6**	**6**
11	(Italy) G Pozzi	6	4
5	**(Belgium) F Dewulf**	**7**	**6**

Quarterfinals
14	**(Australia) S Draper**	**6**	**6**
5	(Belgium) F Dewulf	3	2

=== Bottom half ===
==== Section 3 ====
First round
**(South Africa) D Nainkin**	**6**	**7**
(Australia) S Stolle	2	6
**(Italy) D Nargiso**	**6**	**6**
(United States) O Motevassel	4	4
**(Germany) R Schüttler**	4	**6**	**6**
12	(United States) J-M Gambill	**6**	3	3
**(United States) D Caldwell**	3	**6**	**7**
13	(Denmark) K Carlsen	**6**	4	5
**(Paraguay) R Delgado**	**6**	**6**
(United States) S Campbell	3	2
**(United States) J Arias**	**6**	**2**
(United States) W McGuire	4	5R

Second round
**(United States) V Spadea**	**6**	6	**6**
6	(South Africa) D Nainkin	4	**7**	1
**(Italy) D Nargiso**	**6**	**6**
(Germany) R Schüttler	4	4
**(United States) D Caldwell**	3	**7**	**6**
(Paraguay) R Delgado	**6**	6	2
(United States) J Arias	1	2
3	**(South Africa) W Ferreira**	**6**	**6**

Third round
6	**(United States) V Spadea**	**7**	**6**
(Italy) D Nargiso	6	4
(United States) D Caldwell	5	3
3	**(South Africa) W Ferreira**	**7**	**6**

Quarterfinals
6	(United States) V Spadea	4	**7**	1
3	**(South Africa) W Ferreira**	**6**	6	**6**

==== Section 4 ====
First round
**(Venezuela) M Ruah**	**6**	6	**6**
(United States) P Harsanyi	0	**7**	2
**(Canada) S Lareau**	**6**	**6**
(United States) S Humphries	4	4
9	**(United States) J Tarango**	**6**	**6**
(Belgium) J Van Herck	1	2
**(Canada) D Nestor**	**6**	**6**
16	(Czech Republic) D Vacek	4	4
**(Belgium) C Van Garsse**	**6**	**6**
(Colombia) M Hadad	3	4
**(United States) D Wheaton**	**6**	**6**
(Australia) P Tramacchi	3	3

Second round
8	(Netherlands) S Schalken	**6**	4	3
**(Venezuela) M Ruah**	3	**6**	**6**
**(Canada) S Lareau**	**7**	**6**
9	(United States) J Tarango	6	2
(Canada) D Nestor	**7**	4	4
**(Belgium) C Van Garsse**	6	**6**	**6**
(United States) D Wheaton	4	2
2	**(United States) A Agassi**	**6**	**6**

Third round
(Venezuela) M Ruah	4	3
**(Canada) S Lareau**	**6**	**6**
(Belgium) C Van Garsse	3	4
2	**(United States) A Agassi**	**6**	**6**

Quarterfinals
(Canada) S Lareau	1	2
2	**(United States) A Agassi**	**6**	**6**
