= 1997 Legg Mason Tennis Classic – Doubles =

Doubles
- 1997 Legg Mason Tennis Classic

Final
- Champions: (United States) Luke Jensen (United States) Murphy Jensen
- Runners-up: (South Africa) Neville Godwin (Netherlands) Fernon Wibier
- Score: 6–4, 6–4

Details
- Draw: 28
- Seeds: 8

Events
Singles	Doubles
← 1996 ·	Washington Open	· 1998 →

Grant Connell and Scott Davis were the defending champions, but Connell did not compete this year. Davis teamed up with Kelly Jones and lost in the quarterfinals to Geoff Grant and Mark Merklein.

Luke Jensen and Murphy Jensen won the title by defeating Neville Godwin and Fernon Wibier 6–4, 6–4 in the final.

== Seeds ==
The top four seeds received a bye to the second round.

1. (South Africa) Ellis Ferreira / (United States) Patrick Galbraith (quarterfinals)
2. (n/a)
3. (United States) Luke Jensen / (United States) Murphy Jensen (champions)
4. (United States) Scott Davis / (United States) Kelly Jones (quarterfinals)
5. (n/a)
6. (Belarus) Max Mirnyi / (Zimbabwe) Kevin Ullyett (first round)
7. (South Africa) Neville Godwin / (Netherlands) Fernon Wibier (final)
8. (United States) Kent Kinnear / (North Macedonia) Aleksandar Kitinov (second round)

== Draw ==
=== Key ===
- Q = Qualifier
- WC = Wild card
- LL = Lucky loser
- Alt = Alternate
- ITF = ITF entry
- PR = Protected ranking
- SR = Special ranking
- SE = Special exempt
- JE = Junior exempt
- JR = Junior Accelerator Programme entrant
- CO = College Accelerator Programme entrant
- NG = Next Gen Accelerator Program entrant
- w/o = Walkover
- r = Retired
- d = Defaulted

=== Finals ===
Semifinals
7	(South Africa) Neville Godwin (Netherlands) Fernon Wibier	7	7
(United States) Geoff Grant (The Bahamas) Mark Merklein	6	5
3	(United States) Luke Jensen (United States) Murphy Jensen	4	7	7
(United States) T. J. Middleton (Armenia) Sargis Sargsian	6	6	6

Final
7	(South Africa) Neville Godwin (Netherlands) Fernon Wibier	4	4
3	(United States) Luke Jensen (United States) Murphy Jensen	6	6

=== Top half ===
First round
WC	(Germany) T Haas (Czech Republic) P Korda	6	6
WC	(United States) D Cantwell (United States) Jeremy Loomis	1	3
(Mexico) Ó Ortiz (Israel) E Ran	6	7	2
(United States) D DiLucia (United States) B Shelton	7	6	6
(Canada) G Michibata (The Bahamas) R Smith	6	2
7	(South Africa) N Godwin (Netherlands) F Wibier	7	6
(United States) C Clark (United States) T Phillipps	7	2	0
(Netherlands) M Hilpert (South Africa) D Nainkin	6	6	6
(Australia) B Ellwood (Australia) M Tebbutt	3	7	4
(United States) G Grant (The Bahamas) M Merklein	6	6	6
(India) M Bhupathi (United States) T Ho	6	6	7
6	(Belarus) M Mirnyi (Zimbabwe) K Ullyett	7	3	6

Second round
1	(South Africa) E Ferreira (United States) P Galbraith	6	3	7
WC	(Germany) T Haas (Czech Republic) P Korda	3	6	6
(United States) D DiLucia (United States) B Shelton	6	6	3
7	(South Africa) N Godwin (Netherlands) F Wibier	7	0	6
4	(United States) S Davis (United States) K Jones	3	6	6
(Netherlands) M Hilpert (South Africa) D Nainkin	6	3	4
(United States) G Grant (The Bahamas) M Merklein	6	6	6
(India) M Bhupathi (United States) T Ho	7	4	4

Quarterfinals
1	(South Africa) E Ferreira (United States) P Galbraith	7	3	6
7	(South Africa) N Godwin (Netherlands) F Wibier	6	6	7
4	(United States) S Davis (United States) K Jones	4	6	2
(United States) G Grant (The Bahamas) M Merklein	6	3	6

Semifinals
7	(South Africa) N Godwin (Netherlands) F Wibier	7	7
(United States) G Grant (The Bahamas) M Merklein	6	5

=== Bottom half ===
First round
LL	(United States) S Bryan (Philippines) C Mamiit	3	4
WC	(United States) B Bryan (United States) M Bryan	6	6
Q	(Argentina) G Etlis (Mexico) L Herrera	2	5
Q	(Australia) S Draper (Australia) J Stoltenberg	6	7
(United States) M Joyce (United States) V Spadea	7	6	4
(United States) D Flach (United States) C Woodruff	6	7	6
8	(United States) K Kinnear (North Macedonia) A Kitinov	6	6
WC	(United States) P Goldstein (United States) K Kim	4	3
(United States) TJ Middleton (Armenia) S Sargsian	6	7
(United States) J Salzenstein (United States) D Wheaton	4	5
(United States) D Bowen (France) S Simian	3	6	4
(United States) S Campbell (Hungary) G Köves	6	4	6

Second round
WC	(United States) B Bryan (United States) M Bryan	6	3	4
Q	(Australia) S Draper (Australia) J Stoltenberg	4	6	6
(United States) D Flach (United States) C Woodruff	5	4
3	(United States) L Jensen (United States) M Jensen	7	6
8	(United States) K Kinnear (North Macedonia) A Kitinov	6	6
(United States) TJ Middleton (Armenia) S Sargsian	7	7
(United States) S Campbell (Hungary) G Köves	4	6	6
LL	(Italy) M Martelli (Italy) G Pozzi	6	3	3

Quarterfinals
Q	(Australia) S Draper (Australia) J Stoltenberg	4	4
3	(United States) L Jensen (United States) M Jensen	6	6
(United States) TJ Middleton (Armenia) S Sargsian	7	6
(United States) S Campbell (Hungary) G Köves	6	4

Semifinals
3	(United States) L Jensen (United States) M Jensen	4	7	7
(United States) TJ Middleton (Armenia) S Sargsian	6	6	6
