= 1998 Wimbledon Championships – Men's singles =

Men's singles
- 1998 Wimbledon Championships

Final
- Champion: (United States) Pete Sampras
- Runner-up: (Croatia) Goran Ivanišević
- Score: 6–7^{(2–7)}, 7–6^{(11–9)}, 6–4, 3–6, 6–2

Details
- Draw: 128 (16 Q / 8 WC )
- Seeds: 16

Events
Singles	men	women		boys	girls
Doubles	men	women	mixed	boys	girls
WC Singles	men	women	quad
WC Doubles	men	women	quad
Legends	men	women	seniors
← 1997 ·	Wimbledon Championships	· 1999 →

Defending champion Pete Sampras defeated Goran Ivanišević in the final, 6–7^{(2–7)}, 7–6^{(11–9)}, 6–4, 3–6, 6–2 to win the gentlemen's singles tennis title at the 1998 Wimbledon Championships. With the win, Sampras equalled Björn Borg's Open Era records of five Wimbledon titles and eleven major men's singles titles. It was Ivanišević's third runner-up finish at the event (he would win the title three years later).

== Seeds ==
1. (United States) Pete Sampras (champion)
2. (Chile) Marcelo Ríos (first round)
3. (Czech Republic) Petr Korda (quarterfinals)
4. (United Kingdom) Greg Rusedski (first round, retired)
5. (Spain) Carlos Moyá (second round)
6. (Australia) Patrick Rafter (fourth round)
7. (Russia) Yevgeny Kafelnikov (first round)
8. (France) Cédric Pioline (first round)
9. (Netherlands) Richard Krajicek (semifinals)
10. (Spain) Àlex Corretja (first round)
11. (Sweden) Jonas Björkman (third round)
12. (United Kingdom) Tim Henman (semifinals)
13. (United States) Andre Agassi (second round)
14. (Croatia) Goran Ivanišević (final)
15. (Slovakia) Karol Kučera (first round)
16. (Spain) Félix Mantilla (third round)

Click on the seed number of a player to go to their draw section.

== Draw ==
=== Key ===
- Q = Qualifier
- WC = Wild card
- LL = Lucky loser
- Alt = Alternate
- ITF = ITF entry
- PR = Protected ranking
- SR = Special ranking
- SE = Special exempt
- JE = Junior exempt
- JR = Junior Accelerator Programme entrant
- CO = College Accelerator Programme entrant
- NG = Next Gen Accelerator Program entrant
- w/o = Walkover
- r = Retired
- d = Defaulted

=== Finals ===
Quarterfinals
1	(United States) Pete Sampras	7^{7}	6	6
(Australia) Mark Philippoussis	6^{5}	4	4
3	(Czech Republic) Petr Korda	3	4	2
12	(United Kingdom) Tim Henman	6	6	6
(Netherlands) Jan Siemerink	6^{10}	6^{5}	6^{6}
14	(Croatia) Goran Ivanišević	7^{12}	7^{7}	7^{8}
9	(Netherlands) Richard Krajicek	6	6	6
(Italy) Davide Sanguinetti	2	3	4

Semifinals
1	(United States) Pete Sampras	6	4	7	6
12	(United Kingdom) Tim Henman	3	6	5	3
14	(Croatia) Goran Ivanišević	6	6	5	6^{5}	15
9	(Netherlands) Richard Krajicek	3	4	7	7^{7}	13

Final
1	(United States) Pete Sampras	6^{2}	7^{11}	6	3	6
14	(Croatia) Goran Ivanišević	7^{7}	6^{9}	4	6	2

=== Top half ===
==== Section 1 ====
First round
1	(United States) P Sampras	6	6	6
(Slovakia) D Hrbatý	3	3	2
(Sweden) M Tillström	6	6^{5}	7	6
Q	(Germany) A Rădulescu	4	7^{7}	5	3
(Canada) D Nestor	7^{7}	7^{10}	4	0	0
(Sweden) T Enqvist	6^{2}	6^{8}	6	6	6
(Australia) S Draper	6	7	3	6
(Germany) R Schüttler	3	5	6	3
(Morocco) K Alami	6	3	4	6	5
Q	(United States) B MacPhie	4	6	6	3	7
(Czech Republic) M Damm	3	6^{8}	3
Q	(France) S Grosjean	6	7^{10}	6
(Czech Republic) R Vašek	7^{7}	6	6
(Germany) O Gross	6^{4}	3	1
LL	(Belgium) C Van Garsse	2	2	6	6	3
16	(Spain) F Mantilla	6	6	1	4	6

Second round
1	(United States) P Sampras	6	6	7^{7}
(Sweden) M Tillström	4	4	6^{4}
(Sweden) T Enqvist	6^{5}	6	6	6
(Australia) S Draper	7^{7}	1	4	3
Q	(United States) B MacPhie	4	6	1	4
Q	(France) S Grosjean	6	3	6	6
(Czech Republic) R Vašek	6^{4}	6	3	4
16	(Spain) F Mantilla	7^{7}	3	6	6

Third round
1	(United States) P Sampras	6	7^{7}	7^{7}
(Sweden) T Enqvist	3	6^{4}	6^{3}
Q	(France) S Grosjean	6	7^{10}	6
16	(Spain) F Mantilla	0	6^{8}	2

Fourth round
1	(United States) P Sampras	6	6	6
Q	(France) S Grosjean	3	4	4

==== Section 2 ====
First round
10	(Spain) À Corretja	6^{3}	2	3
(United States) J Gimelstob	7^{7}	6	6
(Germany) J Knippschild	6	3	6^{7}	1
(Australia) M Woodforde	4	6	7^{9}	6
(Netherlands) P Haarhuis	6	3	3	0
(United States) J Tarango	1	6	6	6
(Brazil) G Kuerten	6	3	1	6	8
(Australia) J Stoltenberg	4	6	6	4	10
(Argentina) L Arnold Ker	6	6^{6}	3	3
(Czech Republic) B Ulihrach	2	7^{8}	6	6
Q	(Italy) D Bracciali	4	6^{6}	7^{8}	6	6
WC	(United Kingdom) M Lee	6	7^{8}	6^{6}	2	2
Q	(United States) A O'Brien	4	4	6	6	6
(Denmark) K Carlsen	6	6	4	3	4
(Australia) M Philippoussis	6^{5}	7^{7}	6	6
7	(Russia) Y Kafelnikov	7^{7}	6^{1}	4	2

Second round
(United States) J Gimelstob	6	1	4	4
(Australia) M Woodforde	2	6	6	6
(United States) J Tarango	4	6	2	7^{7}	3
(Australia) J Stoltenberg	6	2	6	6^{3}	6
(Czech Republic) B Ulihrach	4	4	6	2
Q	(Italy) D Bracciali	6	6	3	6
Q	(United States) A O'Brien	7^{7}	4	6^{2}	3
(Australia) M Philippoussis	6^{3}	6	7^{7}	6

Third round
(Australia) M Woodforde	1	6	3	6	3
(Australia) J Stoltenberg	6	3	6	3	6
Q	(Italy) D Bracciali	3	4	4
(Australia) M Philippoussis	6	6	6

Fourth round
(Australia) J Stoltenberg	7	1	3	3
(Australia) M Philippoussis	5	6	6	6

==== Section 3 ====
First round
3	(Czech Republic) P Korda	6	6	6
(Spain) J Sánchez	3	4	3
(United States) S Campbell	3	6	1	0
(Belgium) F Dewulf	6	2	6	6
WC	(United Kingdom) D Sapsford	6^{6}	2	3
(France) J Golmard	7^{8}	6	6
WC	(United States) D Wheaton	1	6^{3}	4
(France) N Escudé	6	7^{7}	6
(Canada) S Lareau	6	6	6
(United States) R Reneberg	4	3	3
(Netherlands) J van Lottum	7^{7}	6	4	7^{7}
(France) G Raoux	6^{1}	3	6	6^{3}
(Germany) T Haas	6^{4}	6	6	6
(Paraguay) R Delgado	7^{7}	3	3	3
(Spain) Á Calatrava	2	4	3
13	(United States) A Agassi	6	6	6

Second round
3	(Czech Republic) P Korda	6	6	6
(Belgium) F Dewulf	4	3	2
(France) J Golmard	6	6	4	7^{8}
(France) N Escudé	3	4	6	6^{6}
(Canada) S Lareau	2	7	4	3
(Netherlands) J van Lottum	6	5	6	6
(Germany) T Haas	4	6	7^{7}	6
13	(United States) A Agassi	6	1	6^{4}	4

Third round
3	(Czech Republic) P Korda	4	7	7	7
(France) J Golmard	6	5	5	5
(Netherlands) J van Lottum	6	6	6
(Germany) T Haas	3	3	3

Fourth round
3	(Czech Republic) P Korda	6	6	7^{7}
(Netherlands) J van Lottum	3	4	6^{4}

==== Section 4 ====
First round
12	(United Kingdom) T Henman	7^{7}	7	5	4	6
(Czech Republic) J Novák	6^{4}	5	7	6	2
Q	(Finland) T Ketola	1	6^{4}	4
Q	(South Africa) D Nainkin	6	7^{7}	6
(United States) J-M Gambill	7^{8}	6	6^{5}	4	8
(Netherlands) S Schalken	6^{6}	4	7^{7}	6	6
(Zimbabwe) B Black	7	3	3	7^{9}	6
(Australia) R Fromberg	5	6	6	6^{7}	2
WC	(United Kingdom) M Petchey	2	6	3	2
(Sweden) M Gustafsson	6	1	6	6
(Spain) JA Viloca	4	3	6	6	2
(United States) M Chang	6	6	3	3	6
(Sweden) T Nydahl	7	6	7^{7}
(Argentina) H Gumy	5	2	6^{4}
Q	(Switzerland) I Heuberger	1	2	6	1
6	(Australia) P Rafter	6	6	4	6

Second round
12	(United Kingdom) T Henman	6	5	6	6
Q	(South Africa) D Nainkin	3	7	4	2
(United States) J-M Gambill	5	4	5
(Zimbabwe) B Black	7	6	7
(Sweden) M Gustafsson	6	5	6	1	6
(United States) M Chang	2	7	2	6	2
(Sweden) T Nydahl	6^{3}	2	6^{3}
6	(Australia) P Rafter	7^{7}	6	7^{7}

Third round
12	(United Kingdom) T Henman	6	6	3	7
(Zimbabwe) B Black	4	4	6	5
(Sweden) M Gustafsson	3	7^{9}	2	1
6	(Australia) P Rafter	6	6^{7}	6	6

Fourth round
12	(United Kingdom) T Henman	6	6^{3}	6	6
6	(Australia) P Rafter	3	7^{7}	3	2

=== Bottom half ===
==== Section 5 ====
First round
5	(Spain) C Moyá	6	4	6	2	6
Q	(India) M Bhupathi	4	6	4	6	3
WC	(United Kingdom) A Richardson	4	6	3	2
(Morocco) H Arazi	6	2	6	6
(Armenia) S Sargsian	6	7	6
(Spain) A Portas	0	5	2
(Uruguay) M Filippini	5	1	4
(Sweden) M Larsson	7	6	6
(Ecuador) N Lapentti	6	3	4	3
(Germany) D Prinosil	4	6	6	6
(Netherlands) J Siemerink	6	6	7^{7}
(Czech Republic) C Doseděl	1	4	6^{3}
Q	(Italy) S Pescosolido	6	6	6
(Costa Rica) JA Marín	2	1	1
Q	(United States) D DiLucia	4	6	3	2
11	(Sweden) J Björkman	6	3	6	6

Second round
5	(Spain) C Moyá	6	4	3	4
(Morocco) H Arazi	4	6	6	6
(Armenia) S Sargsian	3	7^{7}	3	5
(Sweden) M Larsson	6	6^{5}	6	7
(Germany) D Prinosil	4	7^{7}	4	2
(Netherlands) J Siemerink	6	6^{2}	6	6
Q	(Italy) S Pescosolido	6	4	4	2
11	(Sweden) J Björkman	4	6	6	6

Third round
(Morocco) H Arazi	3	3	2
(Sweden) M Larsson	6	6	6
(Netherlands) J Siemerink	7^{8}	5	2	6	7
11	(Sweden) J Björkman	6^{6}	7	6	4	5

Fourth round
(Sweden) M Larsson	6	3	3	2
(Netherlands) J Siemerink	4	6	6	6

==== Section 6 ====
First round
14	(Croatia) G Ivanišević	6	6	6
(South Africa) G Stafford	3	3	2
WC	(Russia) M Safin	3	4	6	4
(Ukraine) A Medvedev	6	6	3	6
(Italy) G Pozzi	6^{1}	6^{4}	3
(Czech Republic) D Vacek	7^{7}	7^{7}	6
(Spain) J Burillo	6	7	3	1	2
(Germany) M-K Goellner	4	5	6	6	6
(Australia) T Woodbridge	6	6	6
(Spain) G Blanco	1	2	1
(Zimbabwe) W Black	6	7	6
(India) L Paes	4	5	4
(United States) T Martin	6	6	6
(Brazil) A Sá	3	4	4
Q	(Australia) M Draper	4	6	5
4	(United Kingdom) G Rusedski	6	2	4^{r}

Second round
14	(Croatia) G Ivanišević	6	7^{7}	4	6
(Ukraine) A Medvedev	3	6^{4}	6	0
(Czech Republic) D Vacek	6	7	6
(Germany) M-K Goellner	4	5	3
(Australia) T Woodbridge	6	3	6	6
(Zimbabwe) W Black	1	6	3	2
(United States) T Martin	6	7	6
Q	(Australia) M Draper	3	5	2

Third round
14	(Croatia) G Ivanišević	6^{6}	7^{7}	6	6
(Czech Republic) D Vacek	7^{8}	6^{4}	3	4
(Australia) T Woodbridge	4	6	6^{1}	4
(United States) T Martin	6	4	7^{7}	6

Fourth round
14	(Croatia) G Ivanišević	7^{7}	6	3	7^{7}
(United States) T Martin	6^{5}	3	6	6^{2}

==== Section 7 ====
First round
8	(France) C Pioline	4	6	6	6^{5}	11
(Switzerland) M Rosset	6	3	4	7^{7}	13
Q	(The Bahamas) M Knowles	5	0	1
WC	(United Kingdom) C Wilkinson	7	6	6
(Sweden) M Norman	5	5	6^{5}
(Spain) A Costa	7	7	7^{7}
(France) A Clément	6	3	4	2
(South Africa) W Ferreira	4	6	6	6
(Spain) J Alonso	2	2	3
(Germany) N Kiefer	6	6	6
(Germany) H Dreekmann	6^{3}	7^{12}	6	3	6
WC	(United Kingdom) B Cowan	7^{7}	6^{10}	3	6	3
Q	(South Africa) N Godwin	4	2	3
(Romania) D Pescariu	6	6	6
(New Zealand) B Steven	3	6^{7}	6	2
9	(Netherlands) R Krajicek	6	7^{9}	4	6

Second round
(Switzerland) M Rosset	4	4	6^{3}
WC	(United Kingdom) C Wilkinson	6	6	7^{7}
(Spain) A Costa	6	5	3	3
(South Africa) W Ferreira	3	7	6	6
(Germany) N Kiefer	6	6	1	6
(Germany) H Dreekmann	4	3	6	4
(Romania) D Pescariu	1	3	2
9	(Netherlands) R Krajicek	6	6	6

Third round
WC	(United Kingdom) C Wilkinson	2	6	3	1
(South Africa) W Ferreira	6	4	6	6
(Germany) N Kiefer	4	6^{2}	6^{4}
9	(Netherlands) R Krajicek	6	7^{7}	7^{7}

Fourth round
(South Africa) W Ferreira	3	3	5
9	(Netherlands) R Krajicek	6	6	7

==== Section 8 ====
First round
15	(Slovakia) K Kučera	6^{6}	3	4
Q	(Belarus) V Voltchkov	7^{8}	6	6
Q	(United States) W McGuire	3	0	5
(Australia) M Tebbutt	6	6	7
(Argentina) M Puerta	7^{7}	3	5	4
(Argentina) F Squillari	6^{5}	6	7	6
(Italy) D Sanguinetti	6^{0}	6	6	2
(Belgium) J Van Herck	7^{7}	1	1	0^{r}
(Romania) A Pavel	3	3	3
(United States) V Spadea	6	6	6
(United States) J Courier	4	6^{6}	4
(Sweden) T Johansson	6	7^{8}	6
(Germany) M Sinner	2	2	4
(Argentina) G Cañas	6	6	6
(Spain) F Clavet	6	3	7	3	6
2	(Chile) M Ríos	3	6	5	6	3

Second round
Q	(Belarus) V Voltchkov	6	6	7^{7}
(Australia) M Tebbutt	4	3	6^{4}
(Argentina) F Squillari	1	3	2
(Italy) D Sanguinetti	6	6	6
(United States) V Spadea	5	1	3
(Sweden) T Johansson	7	6	6
(Argentina) G Cañas	7^{7}	6	6^{4}	1	4
(Spain) F Clavet	6^{2}	2	7^{7}	6	6

Third round
Q	(Belarus) V Voltchkov	6	1	7	2	1
(Italy) D Sanguinetti	3	6	5	6	6
(Sweden) T Johansson	6^{4}	3	3
(Spain) F Clavet	7^{7}	6	6

Fourth round
(Italy) D Sanguinetti	7^{7}	6	6
(Spain) F Clavet	6^{3}	1	4

Preceded by 1998 French Open – Men's singles	Grand Slam men's singles	Succeeded by 1998 US Open – Men's singles
