= 1995 Legg Mason Tennis Classic – Singles =

Singles
- 1995 Legg Mason Tennis Classic

Final
- Champion: (United States) Andre Agassi
- Runner-up: (Sweden) Stefan Edberg
- Score: 6–4, 2–6, 7–5

Details
- Draw: 56 (5WC/7Q)
- Seeds: 16

Events
| Singles | Doubles |
- Washington Open

Stefan Edberg was the defending champion, but lost in the final to Andre Agassi. The score in the final was 6–4, 2–6, 7–5.

== Seeds ==
The first eight seeds received a bye to the second round.

1. (United States) Andre Agassi (champion)
2. (Sweden) Stefan Edberg (final)
3. (Sweden) Thomas Enqvist (third round)
4. (United States) Todd Martin (semifinals)
5. (Australia) Jason Stoltenberg (quarterfinals)
6. (United States) MaliVai Washington (third round)
7. (France) Olivier Delaître (second round)
8. (United States) Richey Reneberg (second round)
9. (United States) Aaron Krickstein (second round)
10. (Czech Republic) Petr Korda (first round)
11. (United States) Patrick McEnroe (quarterfinals)
12. (Czech Republic) Martin Damm (second round)
13. (Australia) Patrick Rafter (semifinals)
14. (Zimbabwe) Byron Black (third round)
15. (United States) Vince Spadea (first round)
16. (Romania) Adrian Voinea (second round)

== Draw ==
Key

- Q = Qualifier
- WC = Wild card
- LL = Lucky loser
- Alt = Alternate
- ITF = ITF entry
- PR = Protected ranking
- SR = Special ranking
- SE = Special exempt
- JE = Junior exempt
- JR = Junior Accelerator Programme entrant
- CO = College Accelerator Programme entrant
- NG = Next Gen Accelerator Program entrant
- w/o = Walkover
- r = Retired
- d = Defaulted

=== Finals ===
Quarterfinals
1 | (United States) Andre Agassi | 6 | 6
(Colombia) Mauricio Hadad | 3 | 4
4 | (United States) Todd Martin | 6 | 6
5 | (Australia) Jason Stoltenberg | 2 | 3
11 | (United States) Patrick McEnroe | 6^{4} | 0
13/WC | (Australia) Patrick Rafter | 7^{7} | 6
(Italy) Cristiano Caratti | 4 | 7 | 6^{1}
2 | (Sweden) Stefan Edberg | 6 | 5 | 7^{7}

Semifinals
1 | (United States) Andre Agassi | 6 | 7
4 | (United States) Todd Martin | 4 | 6
13/WC | (Australia) Patrick Rafter | 5 | 7 | 2
2 | (Sweden) Stefan Edberg | 7 | 5 | 6

Final
1 | (United States) Andre Agassi | 6 | 2 | 7
2 | (Sweden) Stefan Edberg | 4 | 6 | 5

=== Top half ===
==== Section 1 ====
First round
(France) R Gilbert | 6 | 6^{2} | 6
(Sweden) H Holm | 2 | 7^{7} | 2
Q | (Canada) G Connell | 4 | 2
(United States) M Joyce | 6 | 6
(Australia) J Morgan | 6 | 6
15 | (United States) C Spadea | 4 | 1
9 | (United States) A Krickstein | 6 | 6
Q | (South Africa) M Ondruska | 3 | 3
(Colombia) M Hadad | 6 | 6
Q | (United States) K Thorne | 3 | 4
(Australia) M Philippoussis | 6^{7} | 6 | 6
Q | (United States) R Givone | 7^{9} | 2 | 4

Second round
1 | (United States) A Agassi | 6 | 6
(France) R Gilbert | 2 | 2
(United States) M Joyce | 6 | 7^{7}
(Australia) J Morgan | 4 | 6^{5}
9 | (United States) A Krickstein | 6 | 1 | 4
(Colombia) M Hadad | 3 | 6 | 6
(Australia) M Philippoussis | 6 | 6
7 | (France) O Delaître | 3 | 2

Third round
1 | (United States) A Agassi | 6 | 6
(United States) M Joyce | 2 | 2
(Colombia) M Hadad | 1 | 7 | 7^{7}
(Australia) M Philippoussis | 6 | 5 | 6^{3}

Quarterfinals
1 | (United States) A Agassi | 6 | 6
(Colombia) M Hadad | 3 | 4

==== Section 2 ====
First round
(Germany) M Zoecke | 4 | 2
(Spain) J Burillo | 6 | 6
WC | (United States) P Goldstein | 6 | 4 | 3
(Venezuela) N Pereira | 4 | 6 | 6
(United States) J Tarango | 3 | 7 | 3
14 | (Zimbabwe) B Black | 6 | 5 | 6
12 | (Czech Republic) M Damm | 6 | 4 | 6
(United States) J Grabb | 2 | 6 | 3
(Australia) S Draper | 2 | 1
(Italy) G Pozzi | 6 | 6
(Germany) J Renzenbrink | 2 | 0
(United States) D Rostagno | 6 | 6

Second round
4 | (United States) T Martin | 6 | 6
(Spain) J Burillo | 3 | 4
(Venezuela) N Pereira | 2 | 6 | 3
14 | (Zimbabwe) B Black | 6 | 3 | 6
12 | (Czech Republic) M Damm | 6^{4} | 2
(Italy) G Pozzi | 7^{7} | 6
(United States) D Rostagno | 2 | 4
5 | (Australia) J Stoltenberg | 6 | 6

Third round
4 | (United States) T Martin | 4 | 7 | 6
14 | (Zimbabwe) B Black | 6 | 5 | 1
(Italy) G Pozzi | 0 | 4
5 | (Australia) J Stoltenberg | 6 | 6

Quarterfinals
4 | (United States) T Martin | 6 | 6
5 | (Australia) J Stoltenberg | 2 | 3

=== Bottom half ===
==== Section 3 ====
First round
(Germany) C Arriens | 6 | 6
(Belgium) F Dewulf | 3 | 3
WC | (Netherlands) R Wassen | 3 | 6 | 6
(Germany) P Baur | 6 | 0 | 3
(Germany) A Mronz | 3 | 2
11 | (United States) P McEnroe | 6 | 6
13/WC | (Australia) P Rafter | 1 | 7 | 6
Q | (United States) D Johnson | 6 | 5 | 3
WC | (United States) S Humphries | 1 | 3
(United States) J Stark | 6 | 6
WC | (United States) W McGuire | 3 | 6 | 6
(Mexico) Ó Ortiz | 6 | 2 | 3

Second round
6 | (United States) M Washington | 6 | 6
(Germany) C Arriens | 2 | 2
WC | (Netherlands) R Wassen | 4 | 3
11 | (United States) P McEnroe | 6 | 6
13/WC | (Australia) P Rafter | 6 | 6
(United States) J Stark | 1 | 4
WC | (United States) W McGuire | 6 | 2 | 3
3 | (Sweden) T Enqvist | 2 | 6 | 6

Third round
6 | (United States) M Washington | 5 | 3
11 | (United States) P McEnroe | 7 | 6
13/WC | (Australia) P Rafter | 6 | 6
3 | (Sweden) T Enqvist | 2 | 4

Quarterfinals
11 | (United States) P McEnroe | 6^{4} | 0
13/WC | (Australia) P Rafter | 7^{7} | 6

==== Section 4 ====
First round
Q | (South Africa) G Stafford | 4 | 7^{7} | 6
(Germany) D Prinosil | 6 | 6^{4} | 0
(Hungary) S Noszály | 6 | 6^{3} | 0
(Italy) C Caratti | 4 | 7^{7} | 6
(Portugal) N Marques | 4 | 6 | 6
10 | (Czech Republic) P Korda | 6 | 4 | 4
16 | (Romania) A Voinea | 4 | 6 | 6
Q | (South Africa) D Nainkin | 6 | 1 | 2
(South Africa) D Adams | 2 | 3
(Kenya) P Wekesa | 6 | 6
(Australia) M Tebbutt | 6 | 6
(Australia) W Masur | 3 | 2

Second round
8 | (United States) R Reneberg | 6 | 4 | 2
Q | (South Africa) G Stafford | 3 | 6 | 6
(Italy) C Caratti | 6 | 6
(Portugal) N Marques | 2 | 2
16 | (Romania) A Voinea | 4 | 6 | 6^{4}
(Kenya) P Wekesa | 6 | 3 | 7^{7}
(Australia) M Tebbutt | 2 | 2
2 | (Sweden) S Edberg | 6 | 6

Third round
Q | (South Africa) G Stafford | 6^{6} | 1
(Italy) C Caratti | 7^{8} | 6
(Kenya) P Wekesa | 2 | 1
2 | (Sweden) S Edberg | 6 | 6

Quarterfinals
(Italy) C Caratti | 4 | 7 | 6^{1}
2 | (Sweden) S Edberg | 6 | 5 | 7^{7}
