= Carl Clark =

American photographer (1933–2015)

Carl Clark (1933–2015) was an American photographer and United States Army veteran.

== About ==
Born as Carlton L. Clark in Boston, Massachusetts, in 1933, Clark spent most of the latter part of his life working in Baltimore, Maryland, where he captured views of African American life. After serving three combat tours in Korea and Vietnam, he earned a bachelor's degree in Sociology from the University of Nebraska, followed then a bachelor's degree in Fine Arts from the Maryland Institute College of Art.

Clark's photographs have been on exhibit at the Baltimore Museum of Art, Brooklyn Museum of Art, Maryland Art Place, the Museum of Fine Arts, Houston, the Museum of the National Center of Afro-American Artists in Boston, the Royal Photographic Society of England, the Smithsonian Institution, and School 33 Art Center in Baltimore.
