= 1996 Legg Mason Tennis Classic – Doubles =

Doubles
- 1996 Legg Mason Tennis Classic

Final
- Champions: (Canada) Grant Connell (United States) Scott Davis
- Runners-up: (United States) Doug Flach (United States) Chris Woodruff
- Score: 7–6, 3–6, 6–3

Details
- Draw: 28
- Seeds: 8

Events
Singles	Doubles
← 1995 ·	Washington Open	· 1997 →

Olivier Delaître and Jeff Tarango were the defending champions but did not compete that year.

Grant Connell and Scott Davis won in the final 7–6, 3–6, 6–3 against Doug Flach and Chris Woodruff.

== Seeds ==
The top four seeded teams received byes into the second round.

1. (South Africa) Ellis Ferreira / (United States) Patrick Galbraith (quarterfinals)
2. (Netherlands) Jacco Eltingh / (Netherlands) Paul Haarhuis (quarterfinals)
3. (United States) Jim Grabb / (Czech Republic) Cyril Suk (quarterfinals)
4. (United States) Brian MacPhie / (Australia) Michael Tebbutt (quarterfinals)
5. (Australia) Paul Kilderry / (Australia) Patrick Rafter (semifinals)
6. (United States) Kent Kinnear / (United States) Dave Randall (second round)
7. (United States) Rick Leach / (United States) Matt Lucena (first round)
8. (Canada) Grant Connell / (United States) Scott Davis (champions)

== Draw ==
=== Key ===
- Q = Qualifier
- WC = Wild card
- LL = Lucky loser
- Alt = Alternate
- ITF = ITF entry
- PR = Protected ranking
- SR = Special ranking
- SE = Special exempt
- JE = Junior exempt
- JR = Junior Accelerator Programme entrant
- CO = College Accelerator Programme entrant
- NG = Next Gen Accelerator Program entrant
- w/o = Walkover
- r = Retired
- d = Defaulted

=== Final ===
Semifinals

Final

8
- (Canada) Grant Connell
- (United States) Scott Davis
7
2
6

5
- (Australia) Paul Kilderry
- (Australia) Patrick Rafter
5
6
3

8
- (Canada) Grant Connell
- (United States) Scott Davis
7
3
6

WC
- (United States) Doug Flach
- (United States) Chris Woodruff
6
6
3

WC
- (United States) Doug Flach
- (United States) Chris Woodruff
6
7

- (Czech Republic) Daniel Vacek
- (United States) David Wheaton
2
6

=== Top half ===
First round

Second round

Quarterfinals

Semifinals

1
- (South Africa) E Ferreira
- (United States) P Galbraith
7
6

Q
- (United States) J Gimelstob
- (United States) D Witt
4
7
2

- (South Africa) L Bale
- (South Africa) W Ferreira
6
3

- (South Africa) L Bale
- (South Africa) W Ferreira
6
6
6

1
- (South Africa) E Ferreira
- (United States) P Galbraith
4
2

- (Portugal) J Cunha e Silva
- (France) J-P Fleurian
2
6
6

8
- (Canada) G Connell
- (United States) S Davis
6
6

- (United States) L Jensen
- (United States) M Jensen
6
4
4

- (Portugal) J Cunha e Silva
- (France) J-P Fleurian
4
7
4

- (South Africa) B Haygarth
- (South Africa) M Ondruska
4
6
6

8
- (Canada) G Connell
- (United States) S Davis
6
6
6

8
- (Canada) G Connell
- (United States) S Davis
6
4
7

8
- (Canada) G Connell
- (United States) S Davis
7
2
6

5
- (Australia) P Kilderry
- (Australia) P Rafter
5
6
3

3
- (United States) J Grabb
- (Czech Republic) C Suk
6
6

WC
- (United States) P Goldstein
- (United States) R Wolters
4
6
3

Q
- (Germany) M Hilpert
- (South Africa) D Nainkin
1
2

Q
- (Germany) M Hilpert
- (South Africa) D Nainkin
6
2
6

3
- (United States) J Grabb
- (Czech Republic) C Suk
4
4

- (South Africa) M Barnard
- (South Africa) P Norval
4
7
6

5
- (Australia) P Kilderry
- (Australia) P Rafter
6
6

WC
- (South Africa) N Godwin
- (South Africa) G Stafford
6
6
7

WC
- (South Africa) N Godwin
- (South Africa) G Stafford
7
2
3

WC
- (Spain) A Costa
- (Spain) C Costa
4
1

5
- (Australia) P Kilderry
- (Australia) P Rafter
5
6
6

5
- (Australia) P Kilderry
- (Australia) P Rafter
6
6

=== Bottom half ===
First round

Second round

Quarterfinals

Semifinals

6
- (United States) K Kinnear
- (United States) D Randall
3
6
7

- (United States) D DiLucia
- (United States) K Thorne
6
3
6

6
- (United States) K Kinnear
- (United States) D Randall
4
2

WC
- (United States) D Flach
- (United States) C Woodruff
6
6

WC
- (United States) D Flach
- (United States) C Woodruff
6
6

- (Mexico) A Hernández
- (Mexico) Ó Ortiz
4
4

WC
- (United States) D Flach
- (United States) C Woodruff
6
7

(India) M Bhupathi
(Federal Republic of Yugoslavia) N Djordjevic
6
4
6

4
- (United States) B MacPhie
- (Australia) M Tebbutt
4
6

- (Italy) S Pescosolido
- (France) S Simian
4
6
2

(India) M Bhupathi
(Federal Republic of Yugoslavia) N Djordjevic
6
5
1

4
- (United States) B MacPhie
- (Australia) M Tebbutt
2
7
6

WC
- (United States) D Flach
- (United States) C Woodruff
6
7

7
- (United States) R Leach
- (United States) M Lucena
3
4

- (Czech Republic) D Vacek
- (United States) D Wheaton
2
6

- (Czech Republic) D Vacek
- (United States) D Wheaton
6
6

- (Czech Republic) D Vacek
- (United States) D Wheaton
6
7
7

- (Italy) A Gaudenzi
- (Italy) D Nargiso
6
2

- (Zimbabwe) W Black
- (United States) C Clark
7
6
6

- (Zimbabwe) W Black
- (United States) C Clark
7
6

- (Czech Republic) D Vacek
- (United States) D Wheaton
6
7

- (United States) S Campbell
- (United States) G Grant
4
6
3

2
- (Netherlands) J Eltingh
- (Netherlands) P Haarhuis
4
5

- (Canada) G Michibata
- (The Bahamas) R Smith
6
4
6

- (Canada) G Michibata
- (The Bahamas) R Smith
2
2

2
- (Netherlands) J Eltingh
- (Netherlands) P Haarhuis
6
6
