= 1996 Legg Mason Tennis Classic – Singles =

Singles
- 1996 Legg Mason Tennis Classic

Final
- Champion: (United States) Michael Chang
- Runner-up: (South Africa) Wayne Ferreira
- Score: 6–2, 6–4

Details
- Draw: 56 (7Q / 5WC)
- Seeds: 16

Events
Singles	Doubles
- Washington Open

Andre Agassi was the defending champion but lost in the third round to Patrick Rafter.

Michael Chang won in the final 6–2, 6–4 against Wayne Ferreira.

== Seeds ==
The top eight seeds received a bye to the second round.

1. (United States) Andre Agassi (third round)
2. (United States) Michael Chang (champion)
3. (United States) Jim Courier (second round)
4. (South Africa) Wayne Ferreira (final)
5. (Spain) Albert Costa (third round)
6. (United States) Richey Reneberg (quarterfinals)
7. (Netherlands) Paul Haarhuis (quarterfinals)
8. (Italy) Renzo Furlan (semifinals)
9. (Zimbabwe) Byron Black (second round)
10. (Spain) Carlos Costa (first round)
11. (Czech Republic) Daniel Vacek (first round)
12. (Italy) Andrea Gaudenzi (first round)
13. (Germany) David Prinosil (second round)
14. (United States) Chris Woodruff (third round)
15. (Australia) Patrick Rafter (quarterfinals)
16. (United States) Vince Spadea (third round)

== Draw ==
Key

- Q = Qualifier
- WC = Wild card
- LL = Lucky loser
- Alt = Alternate
- ITF = ITF entry
- PR = Protected ranking
- SR = Special ranking
- SE = Special exempt
- JE = Junior exempt
- JR = Junior Accelerator Programme entrant
- CO = College Accelerator Programme entrant
- NG = Next Gen Accelerator Program entrant
- w/o = Walkover
- r = Retired
- d = Defaulted

=== Finals ===
Semifinals
8	(Italy) Renzo Furlan	3	7^{13}	3
4	(South Africa) Wayne Ferreira	6	6^{11}	6
(Denmark) Kenneth Carlsen	3	4
2	(United States) Michael Chang	6	6

Final
4	(South Africa) Wayne Ferreira	2	4
2	(United States) Michael Chang	6	6

=== Top half ===
==== Section 1 ====
First round
(Netherlands) J Eltingh	7^{7}	7^{7}
(Italy) S Pesocsolido	6^{4}	6^{4}
(South Africa) D Nainkin	4	6	5
(Portugal) J Cunha e Silva	6	3	7
Q	(United States) J Grabb	2	5
15	(Australia) P Rafter	6	7
9	(Zimbabwe) B Black	5	6	6
(United States) C Adams	7	4	4
WC	(United States) D Cantwell	4	0
(Slovakia) K Kučera	6	6
(Mexico) Ó Ortiz	2	4
Q	(Armenia) S Sargsian	6	6

Second round
WC/1	(United States) A Agassi	7^{7}	6
(Netherlands) J Eltingh	6^{1}	3
(Portugal) J Cunha e Silva	2	2
15	(Australia) P Rafter	6	6
9	(Zimbabwe) B Black	2	0
(Slovakia) K Kučera	6	6
Q	(Armenia) S Sargsian	3	5
8	(Italy) R Furlan	6	7

Third round
WC/1	(United States) A Agassi	7^{7}	0	2
15	(Australia) P Rafter	6^{2}	6	6
(Slovakia) K Kučera	6^{7}	4
8	(Italy) R Furlan	7^{9}	6

Quarterfinals
15	(Australia) P Rafter	4	6	5
8	(Italy) R Furlan	6	4	7

==== Section 2 ====
First round
(Uzbekistan) O Ogorodov	3	6	7
WC	(United States) P Goldstein	6	3	5
(India) L Paes	4	2
(Slovakia) J Krošlák	6	6
(France) J-P Fleurian	2	2
14	(United States) C Woodruff	6	6
11	(Czech Republic) D Vacek	3	3
(Venezuela) N Pereira	6	6
(Italy) C Caratti	6	5	2
(France) L Roux	4	7	6
(South Africa) G Stafford	7	6^{7}	2
Q	(South Africa) M Ondruska	5	7^{9}	6

Second round
4	(South Africa) W Ferreira	6	6
(Uzbekistan) O Ogorodov	2	4
(Slovakia) J Krošlák	4	3
14	(United States) C Woodruff	6	6
(Venezuela) N Pereira	6^{1}	6^{8}
(France) L Roux	7^{7}	7^{10}
Q	(South Africa) M Ondruska	4	3
6	(United States) R Reneberg	6	6

Third round
4	(South Africa) W Ferreira	6	6
14	(United States) C Woodruff	3	1
(France) L Roux	6	6^{2}	1
6	(United States) R Reneberg	4	7^{7}	6

Quarterfinals
4	(South Africa) W Ferreira	6	6
6	(United States) R Reneberg	4	2

=== Bottom half ===
==== Section 3 ====
First round
(Mexico) A Hernández	3	7^{7}	3
(United States) S Campbell	6	6^{2}	6
(France) S Simian	3	3
(Canada) S Lareau	6	6
(Denmark) K Carlsen	4	6	7^{10}
12	(Italy) A Gaudenzi	6	3	6^{8}
13	(Germany) D Prinosil	6^{4}	6	6
(Denmark) F Fetterlein	7^{7}	3	4
(Australia) M Tebbutt	2	4
(Morocco) H Arazi	6	6
Q	(South Africa) N Godwin	7^{10}	4	6
(United States) D Wheaton	6^{8}	6	3

Second round
5	(Spain) A Costa	6	2	6
(United States) S Campbell	3	6	4
(Canada) S Lareau	3	3
(Denmark) K Carlsen	6	6
13	(Germany) D Prinosil	6^{6}	6	4
(Morocco) H Arazi	7^{8}	3	6
Q	(South Africa) N Godwin	6	6
3	(United States) J Courier	4	4

Third round
5	(Spain) A Costa	4	5
(Denmark) K Carlsen	6	7
(Morocco) H Arazi	6	6^{1}	4
Q	(South Africa) N Godwin	2	7^{7}	6

Quarterfinals
(Denmark) K Carlsen	6	6
Q	(South Africa) N Godwin	3	2

==== Section 4 ====
First round
(United States) M Joyce	6	2	6
(Italy) G Pozzi	3	6	3
(Colombia) M Hadad	6	6
(Hungary) S Noszály	3	2
Q	(United States) W McGuire	6	7^{7}
10	(Spain) C Costa	4	6^{5}
16	(United States) V Spadea	6	7
WC	(United States) L Jensen	2	5
WC	(United States) J Gimelstob	6^{2}	3
(United States) B Shelton	7^{7}	6
Q	(United States) G Grant	6	6
Q	(Germany) M Hilpert	2	2

Second round
7	(Netherlands) P Haarhuis	3	6	6
(United States) M Joyce	6	4	1
(Colombia) M Hadad	6	6
Q	(United States) W McGuire	3	4
16	(United States) V Spadea	6	6
(United States) B Shelton	4	1
Q	(United States) G Grant	1	3
2	(United States) M Chang	6	6

Third round
7	(Netherlands) P Haarhuis	7^{9}	7^{7}
(Colombia) M Hadad	6^{7}	6^{3}
16	(United States) V Spadea	3	7	0
2	(United States) M Chang	6	5	6

Quarterfinals
7	(Netherlands) P Haarhuis	4	3
2	(United States) M Chang	6	6
