= 2001 Legg Mason Tennis Classic =

Tennis tournament

- Date: August 13–19
- Edition: 33rd
- Category: International Series Gold
- Draw: 56S / 28D
- Prize money: $700,000
- Surface: Hard / outdoor
- Location: Washington, D.C., US
- Venue: William H.G. FitzGerald Tennis Center

Champions

Singles
- (United States) Andy Roddick

Doubles
- (Czech Republic) Martin Damm / (Germany) David Prinosil
- Washington Open

The 2001 Legg Mason Tennis Classic was a men's tennis tournament played on outdoor hard courts at the William H.G. FitzGerald Tennis Center in Washington, D.C. in the United States and was part of the International Series Gold of the 2001 ATP Tour. The tournament ran from August 13 through August 19, 2001. Ninth-seeded Andy Roddick won the singles title.

== Finals ==
=== Singles ===
(United States) Andy Roddick defeated (Netherlands) Sjeng Schalken 6–2, 6–3

- It was Roddick's 3rd singles title of the year and of his career.

=== Doubles ===
(Czech Republic) Martin Damm / (Germany) David Prinosil defeated (United States) Bob Bryan / (United States) Mike Bryan 7–6^{(7–5)}, 6–3

- It was Damm's 1st title of the year and the 19th of his career. It was Prinosil's only title of the year and the 12th of his career.
