= 1998 Legg Mason Tennis Classic =

- Date: July 20–26
- Edition: 29th
- Category: International Series Gold
- Draw: 56S / 28D
- Prize money: $575,000
- Surface: Hard / outdoor
- Location: Washington, D.C., United States

Champions

Singles
- (United States) Andre Agassi

Doubles
- (South Africa) Grant Stafford / (Zimbabwe) Kevin Ullyett
| ← 1997 · | Washington Open | · 1999 → |

The 1998 Legg Mason Tennis Classic was a men's tennis tournament played on outdoor hard courts in Washington, D.C., United States, that was part of the International Series Gold of the 1998 ATP Tour. It was the twenty-ninth edition of the tournament and was held from July 20 through July, 26. Second-seeded Andre Agassi won the singles title.

== Finals ==
=== Singles ===
(United States) Andre Agassi defeated (Australia) Scott Draper, 6–2, 6–0

=== Doubles ===
(South Africa) Grant Stafford / (Zimbabwe) Kevin Ullyett defeated (South Africa) Wayne Ferreira / (United States) Patrick Galbraith, 6–2, 6–4
