= 1995 Legg Mason Tennis Classic =

Tennis tournament

- Date: July 17–24
- Edition: 27th
- Category: Championship Series
- Draw: 64S / 32D
- Prize money: $550,000
- Surface: Hard / outdoor
- Location: Washington, D.C., US

Champions

Singles
- (United States) Andre Agassi

Doubles
- (France) Olivier Delaître / (United States) Jeff Tarango
← 1994 ·	Washington Open	· 1996 →

The 1995 Legg Mason Tennis Classic is a men's tennis tournament held in Washington, D.C. in the United States that was part of the Championship Series of the 1995 ATP Tour. The tournament was played on outdoor hard courts and was held from July 17 through July 24, 1995.

Andre Agassi won his 4th title of the year and 28th of his career. It was his 3rd win at the event, also winning in 1990 and 1991.

== Finals ==
=== Singles ===
(United States) Andre Agassi defeated (Sweden) Stefan Edberg 6–4, 2–6, 7–5

=== Doubles ===
(France) Olivier Delaître / (United States) Jeff Tarango defeated (Czech Republic) Petr Korda / (Czech Republic) Cyril Suk 4–6, 6–3, 6–2
