= John Roddick =

American tennis player

- Country (sports): United States
- Residence: Orlando, Florida, U.S.
- Born: July 4, 1976 (age 50) Omaha, Nebraska, U.S.
- Height: 6 ft 0 in (1.83 m)
- Plays: Right-handed
- Prize money: US$5,229

Singles
- Career record: 0–1
- Career titles: 0
- Highest ranking: No. 871 (6 October 1997)

Doubles
- Career record: 1–1
- Career titles: 0
- Highest ranking: No. 517 (1 March 1999)

John Roddick (born July 4, 1976) is an American former professional tennis player and the current director of tennis and head men's tennis coach at the University of Central Florida.

== Early life ==
Roddick was born in Omaha, Nebraska, the son of Blanche (Corell), a school teacher, and Jerry Roddick, a businessman. He is the older brother of tennis star Andy Roddick. He went on to be four time All American at the University of Georgia from 1995 to 1999 and was named UGA Athlete of the Year in 1998. He was a top US junior and was ranked as high as #6 internationally in singles, and #3 internationally in doubles. However a back injury ultimately put a stop to John's professional career and he turned his attentions to coaching.

== Career ==
John was a 4 time All-American at the University of Georgia. As a coach, he has worked with top touring pros including Mardy Fish, his brother Andy Roddick, and Olga Govortsova. He was the United States Captain at the '06 and '08 ATP World Team Cup. John was the Assistant Coach for the 2001 NCAA Champion University of Georgia. He also served a stint at Florida State. He also spent time working young touring pros in Austin, Texas.

=== Junior highlights ===
As one of the nation's top-ranked junior players, John was a member of the '93 and '94 U.S. National Teams. John was a USTA National Junior Champion, and he was ranked as high as #6 in the world in juniors.

== Coaching career ==
John coached and traveled with his brother, Andy, on a full-time basis from 2006–2008. The highlight of his tenure included the 2006 U.S. Open Final, 2006 Cincinnati Master Series Title, and the 2008 Dubai Title.

John is currently the Director of Tennis at the University of Central Florida. Prior to being named the head coach of the University of Central Florida, John began his college coaching career at the University of Oklahoma. His first year as head coach at the University of Oklahoma saw the team start at #49 in the national rankings and finish in the Elite Eight of the NCAA tournament. This was one of the biggest turnarounds in NCAA tennis history. The NCAA tournament run included a 4-2 Sweet 16 win over arch-rival University of Texas. In his third year at the helm, Roddick led his Sooners to their first conference title after the Sooners defeated Baylor, 4-3. Roddick's Sooners were crowned back-to-back champions after they won the regular-season and post-season Big 12 Championships in 2013. In 2014, Roddick led the Sooners to their first ever #1 national ranking, their 3rd consecutive Big 12 Championship and a 2nd place finish at the NCAA Championships.

John is the former owner and Director of the Roddick Total Tennis Academy in San Antonio, Texas. Notable players who attended the academy included Olga Govortsova, Uladzimir Ignatik, and Ryan Sweeting. Just before accepting his position at Oklahoma, John sold his interest to Myron Grunberg and Leo Lavalle. The academy remains one of the top developmental academies in the world.
