= Mark Draper (tennis) =

Australian tennis player

- Country (sports): Australia
- Born: 11 February 1971 (age 54); Brisbane, Australia
- Height: 185 cm (6 ft 1 in)
- Turned pro: 1989
- Plays: Right-handed
- Prize money: $91,212

Singles
- Career record: 1–4
- Career titles: 0
- Highest ranking: No. 152 (14 September 1998)

Grand Slam singles results
- Australian Open: 1R (1998, 1999)
- Wimbledon: 2R (1998)

Doubles
- Career record: 3–3
- Career titles: 0
- Highest ranking: No. 215 (15 April 1996)

Grand Slam doubles results
- Australian Open: 2R (2000)

Mark Draper (born 11 February 1971) is a former professional tennis player from Australia.

Draper competed in the singles draw of three Grand Slams. He lost his opening match at both of his Australian Open appearances, to Nicolas Kiefer in 1998 and Mark Woodforde in 1999. However, in the 1998 Wimbledon Championships, Draper recorded a win over fourth seed Greg Rusedski. Draper had lost the first set of the match but won the second and was a break up in the third when rain intervened. When they returned the following day, Rusedski, who had been playing with an ankle injury from two weeks prior, was forced to withdraw. The Australian was defeated by Todd Martin in the second round.

He is the elder brother of fellow tennis professional Scott Draper and the pair reached the doubles quarter-finals at the 1995 Legg Mason Tennis Classic. In the round of 16 they scored an upset win over two time Wimbledon finalists Grant Connell and Patrick Galbraith. The brothers were given a wildcard entry in the 2000 Australian Open and they made it into the second round, with a win over South Americans Jaime Oncins and Daniel Orsanic.
