= 2000 Legg Mason Tennis Classic =

- Date: August 1 –20
- Edition: 31st
- Category: International Series Gold
- Draw: 56S / 28D
- Prize money: $700,000
- Surface: Hard / outdoor
- Location: Washington, D.C., United States
- Venue: William H.G. FitzGerald Tennis Center

Champions

Singles
- (Spain) Àlex Corretja

Doubles
- (United States) Alex O'Brien / (United States) Jared Palmer
- Washington Open

The 2000 Legg Mason Tenis Classic was the 31st edition of the Washington Open and was played on outdoor hard courts. The tournament was part of the International Series Gold of the 2000 ATP Tour. It was held at the William H.G. FitzGerald Tennis Center in Washington, D.C. from August 14 through August 20, 2000.

== Finals ==
=== Singles ===
(Spain) Àlex Corretja defeated (United States) Andre Agassi, 6–2, 6–3

- It was Corretja's 4th singles title of the year and the 13th of his career.

=== Doubles ===
(United States) Alex O'Brien / (United States) Jared Palmer defeated (United States) Andre Agassi / (Armenia) Sargis Sargsian, 7–5, 6–1

- It was O'Brien's 2nd title of the year and the 13th of his career. It was Palmer's 3rd title of the year and the 16th of his career.
