= School 33 Art Center =

Art gallery in Baltimore, Maryland

Coordinates: 39.27339°N 76.61173°W

School 33 Art Center is an art gallery and studios in Downtown Baltimore, Maryland. Founded in 1979, it is located in a former elementary school and is run by the Baltimore Office of Promotion & The Arts. It has been considered a major non-profit exhibition spaces in Baltimore.
