= Mashiska Washington =

American tennis player

- Country (sports): United States
- Residence: Delray Beach, Florida
- Born: December 19, 1974 (age 50) Michigan
- Height: 5 ft 11 in (180 cm)
- Turned pro: 1995
- Plays: Right-handed
- Prize money: $143,963

Singles
- Career record: 2-10
- Career titles: 0
- Highest ranking: No. 290 (March 15, 1999)

Grand Slam singles results
- US Open: 1R (1999)

Doubles
- Career record: 3-6
- Career titles: 0
- Highest ranking: No. 510 (June 24, 1996)

Mixed doubles

Grand Slam mixed doubles results
- US Open: 1R (1996)

Mashiska Washington (born December 19, 1974) is a former professional tennis player from the United States. He is the younger brother of 1996 Wimbledon runner-up MaliVai Washington.

== Career ==
Washington played collegiate tennis for Michigan State University and was an All-American in 1994. He got his first taste of ATP Tour tennis in 1995 when he lost to veteran Mats Wilander in the first round of the Canadian Open in Montreal, Quebec.

He was given a wildcard, with his sister Mashona, into the mixed doubles main draw at the US Open. The pair were defeated in the opening round by Cyril Suk and Helena Suková, who are also siblings.

After beating Juan Ignacio Chela in the 1999 Legg Mason Tennis Classic, Washington received another US Open wildcard, this time into the main singles draw, where he lost in the first round to Slovakia's Ján Krošlák in four sets.

The only other time that he made it past the opening round of an ATP Tour tournament was at the 2002 Brasil Open. He defeated fellow qualifier Ivo Heuberger, before losing to eventual champion Gustavo Kuerten.
