= 1996 Legg Mason Tennis Classic =

- Date: July 15–21
- Edition: 28th
- Category: Championship Series
- Draw: 56S / 28D
- Prize money: $550,000
- Surface: Hard / outdoor
- Location: Washington, D.C., US
- Venue: William H.G. FitzGerald Tennis Center

Champions

Singles
- (United States) Michael Chang

Doubles
- (Canada) Grant Connell / (United States) Scott Davis
- Washington Open

The 1996 Legg Mason Tennis Classic was a men's tennis tournament played on outdoor hard courts at the William H.G. FitzGerald Tennis Center in Washington, D.C. in the United States and was part of the Championship Series of the 1996 ATP Tour. It was the 28th edition of the tournament and was held from July 15 through July 21, 1996. Second-seeded Michael Chang won the singles title.

== Finals ==
=== Singles ===
(United States) Michael Chang defeated (South Africa) Wayne Ferreira 6–2, 6–4

- It was Chang's 2nd title of the year and the 25th of his career.

=== Doubles ===
(Canada) Grant Connell / (United States) Scott Davis defeated (United States) Doug Flach / (United States) Chris Woodruff 7–6, 3–6, 6–3

- It was Connell's 4th title of the year and the 21st of his career. It was Davis' only title of the year and the 25th of his career.
