= Fernon Wibier =

Dutch tennis player

- Country (sports): Netherlands
- Born: 25 February 1971 (age 55) Dedemsvaart, Netherlands
- Height: 1.88 m (6 ft 2 in)
- Plays: Right-handed
- Prize money: $563,876

Singles
- Career record: 14–25
- Highest ranking: No. 126 (1997.06.23)

Grand Slam singles results
- Australian Open: 1R (1997)
- French Open: Q3 (1993, 1997)
- Wimbledon: 1R (1993)
- US Open: Q3 (1997)

Doubles
- Career record: 50–82
- Highest ranking: No. 42 (1997.07.28)

Grand Slam doubles results
- Australian Open: 3R (1997)
- French Open: 1R (1997, 1998)
- Wimbledon: 3R (1997)
- US Open: 2R (1996, 1997)

Fernon Wibier (born 25 February 1971) is a former professional tennis player from the Netherlands.

Wibier enjoyed most of his tennis success while playing doubles. During his career he won 1 doubles title. He achieved a career-high doubles ranking of world No. 42 in 1997.

== Career finals ==
=== Doubles (1 title, 3 runner-ups) ===
Result	W/L	Date	Tournament	Surface	Partner	Opponents	Score
Win	1–0	Jun 1994	Rosmalen, Netherlands	Grass	(Netherlands) Stephen Noteboom	(Italy) Diego Nargiso (Sweden) Peter Nyborg	6–3, 1–6, 7–6
Loss	1–1	Oct 1995	Beijing, China	Carpet	(Belgium) Dick Norman	(United States) Tommy Ho (Canada) Sébastien Lareau	6–7, 6–7
Loss	1–2	Jul 1997	Washington D.C., U.S.	Hard	(South Africa) Neville Godwin	(United States) Luke Jensen (United States) Murphy Jensen	4–6, 4–6
Loss	1–3	Apr 1998	Estoril, Portugal	Clay	(Mexico) David Roditi	(United States) Donald Johnson (United States) Francisco Montana	1–6, 6–2, 1–6
