= Dan Cantwell =

American tennis player

- Country (sports): United States

Singles
- Career record: 0–1
- Highest ranking: No. 1266 (Jul 22, 1996)

Doubles
- Career record: 0–1
- Highest ranking: No. 1270 (Oct 20, 1997)

Dan Cantwell is an American former tennis player.

Cantwell, a native of Salisbury, Maryland, was a collegiate tennis player for the University of Maryland. He won the Atlantic Coast Conference singles championship in 1990 and a two-time All-ACC.

In 1996 he featured as a wildcard in the main draw of the Legg Mason Tennis Classic in Washington DC, where he was beaten in the first round by Slovakia's Karol Kučera.

A graduate of the University of Baltimore School of Law, Cantwell now works as an attorney in Maryland.
