= 1994 Legg Mason Tennis Classic =

- Date: July 18–24
- Edition: 26th
- Category: Championship Series
- Draw: 56S / 28D
- Prize money: $525,000
- Surface: Hard / outdoor
- Location: Washington D.C., United States
- Venue: William H.G. FitzGerald Tennis Center

Champions

Singles
- (Sweden) Stefan Edberg

Doubles
- (Canada) Grant Connell / (United States) Patrick Galbraith
- Washington Open

The 1994 Legg Mason Tennis Classic was a men's tennis tournament played on outdoor hard courts at the William H.G. FitzGerald Tennis Center in Washington D.C., United States. It was the 26th edition of the tournament and was held from July 18 through July 24, 1994 and was part of the Championship Series of the 1994 ATP Tour. Second-seeded Stefan Edberg, who entered the tournament on a wildcard, won the singles title.

== Finals ==
=== Singles ===
(Sweden) Stefan Edberg defeated (Australia) Jason Stoltenberg 6–4, 6–2

- It was Edberg's 3rd singles title of the year and the 40th of his career.

=== Doubles ===
(Canada) Grant Connell / (United States) Patrick Galbraith defeated (Sweden) Jonas Björkman / (Switzerland) Jakob Hlasek 6–4, 4–6, 6–3
