= 1999 Legg Mason Tennis Classic – Doubles =

Doubles
- 1999 Legg Mason Tennis Classic

Final
- Champions: (United States) Justin Gimelstob (Canada) Sébastien Lareau
- Runners-up: (South Africa) David Adams (South Africa) John-Laffnie de Jager
- Score: 7–5, 6–7^{(2–7)}, 6–3

Details
- Draw: 28 (4WC/2Q)
- Seeds: 8

Events
Singles	Doubles
- Washington Open

Grant Stafford and Kevin Ullyett were the defending champions. Stafford chose to compete at Indianapolis in the same week. Ullyett partnered with Piet Norval but lost in the semifinals to the eventual champions Justin Gimelstob and Sébastien Lareau.
Justin Gimelstob and Sébastien Lareau won in the final over David Adams and John-Laffnie de Jager, 7–5, 6–7^{(2–7)}, 6–3.

== Seeds ==
The first four seeds received a bye to the second round.

1. (Zimbabwe) Wayne Black / (Australia) Sandon Stolle (quarterfinals)
2. (South Africa) David Adams / (South Africa) John-Laffnie de Jager (final)
3. (United States) Donald Johnson / (Czech Republic) Cyril Suk (semifinals)
4. (Australia) Wayne Arthurs / (Australia) Andrew Kratzmann (second round)
5. (Sweden) Nicklas Kulti / (Sweden) Mikael Tillström (second round)
6. (United States) Justin Gimelstob / (Canada) Sébastien Lareau (champions)
7. (South Africa) Piet Norval / (Zimbabwe) Kevin Ullyett (semifinals)
8. (Italy) Massimo Bertolini / (Italy) Cristian Brandi (second round)

== Draw ==
Key

- Q = Qualifier
- WC = Wild card
- LL = Lucky loser
- Alt = Alternate
- ITF = ITF entry
- PR = Protected ranking
- SR = Special ranking
- SE = Special exempt
- JE = Junior exempt
- JR = Junior Accelerator Programme entrant
- CO = College Accelerator Programme entrant
- NG = Next Gen Accelerator Program entrant
- w/o = Walkover
- r = Retired
- d = Defaulted

=== Finals ===
Semifinals
7	(South Africa) Piet Norval (Zimbabwe) Kevin Ullyett	4	2
6	(United States) Justin Gimelstob (Canada) Sébastien Lareau	6	6
3	(United States) Donald Johnson (Czech Republic) Cyril Suk	3	7^{7}	3
2	(South Africa) David Adams (South Africa) John-Laffnie de Jager	6	6^{5}	6

Final
6	(United States) Justin Gimelstob (Canada) Sébastien Lareau	7	6^{2}	6
2	(South Africa) David Adams (South Africa) John-Laffnie de Jager	5	7^{7}	3

=== Top half ===
First round
WC	(United States) Lee Harang (United States) T Spracklin	2	2
(Argentina) L Arnold Ker (Israel) E Ran	6	6
(Czech Republic) M Damm (Italy) L Tieleman	3	4
(Germany) N Kiefer (Federal Republic of Yugoslavia) N Zimonjić	6	6
(Federal Republic of Yugoslavia) N Đorđević (New Zealand) J Greenhalgh	6^{2}	6^{2}
7	(South Africa) P Norval (Zimbabwe) K Ullyett	7^{7}	7^{7}
(South Africa) M Barnard (United States) TJ Middleton	7	6
(South Africa) N Godwin (South Africa) M Ondruska	5	4
WC	(United States) JM Gambill (United States) Torrey Gambill	4	2
Q	(Switzerland) R Federer (Netherlands) S Groen	6	6
(Australia) B Ellwood (Australia) G Silcock	4	2
6	(United States) J Gimelstob (Canada) S Lareau	6	6

Second round
1	(Zimbabwe) W Black (Australia) S Stolle	6	6
(Argentina) L Arnold Ker (Israel) E Ran	3	3
(Germany) N Kiefer (Federal Republic of Yugoslavia) N Zimonjić	3	4
7	(South Africa) P Norval (Zimbabwe) K Ullyett	6	6
4	(Australia) W Arthurs (Australia) A Kratzmann	4	3
(South Africa) M Barnard (United States) TJ Middleton	6	6
Q	(Switzerland) R Federer (Netherlands) S Groen	2	2
6	(United States) J Gimelstob (Canada) S Lareau	6	6

Quarterfinals
1	(Zimbabwe) W Black (Australia) S Stolle	4	4
7	(South Africa) P Norval (Zimbabwe) K Ullyett	6	6
(South Africa) M Barnard (United States) TJ Middleton	4	4
6	(United States) J Gimelstob (Canada) S Lareau	6	6

Semifinals
7	(South Africa) P Norval (Zimbabwe) K Ullyett	4	2
6	(United States) J Gimelstob (Canada) S Lareau	6	6

=== Bottom half ===
First round
5	(Sweden) N Kulti (Sweden) M Tillström	6	6
(South Africa) R Koenig (United States) E Taino	4	5
(Zimbabwe) B Black (United States) B MacPhie	6	7^{7}
(United States) B Coupe (United States) A Peterson	3	6^{5}
(United States) D Flach (United States) G Grant	6	4	6
WC	(Spain) À Corretja (Paraguay) R Delgado	4	6	4
8	(Italy) M Bertolini (Italy) C Brandi	6	5	6
WC	(United States) P Goldstein (United States) C Mamiit	4	7	4
(United States) D DiLucia (United States) M Keil	6^{4}	3
(Australia) M Hill (United States) S Humphries	7^{7}	6
Q	(Lebanon) A Hamadeh (Canada) B Kokavec	3	6^{4}
(Australia) A Painter (South Africa) B Talbot	6	7^{7}

Second round
5	(Sweden) N Kulti (Sweden) M Tillström	5	6	3
(Zimbabwe) B Black (United States) B MacPhie	7	2	6
(United States) D Flach (United States) G Grant	3	2
3	(United States) D Johnson (Czech Republic) C Suk	6	6
8	(Italy) M Bertolini (Italy) C Brandi	3	6^{1}
(Australia) M Hill (United States) S Humphries	6	7^{7}
(Australia) A Painter (South Africa) B Talbot	6	1	2
2	(South Africa) D Adams (South Africa) JL de Jager	3	6	6

Quarterfinals
(Zimbabwe) B Black (United States) B MacPhie	4	4
3	(United States) D Johnson (Czech Republic) C Suk	6	6
(Australia) M Hill (United States) S Humphries	6^{4}	3
2	(South Africa) D Adams (South Africa) JL de Jager	7^{7}	6

Semifinals
3	(United States) D Johnson (Czech Republic) C Suk	3	7^{7}	3
2	(South Africa) D Adams (South Africa) JL de Jager	6	6^{5}	6

== Qualifying ==
=== Qualifying seeds ===
1. (United Kingdom) Barry Cowan / (South Africa) Wesley Whitehouse (qualifying competition)
2. (Switzerland) Roger Federer / (Netherlands) Sander Groen (qualified)
3. (Lebanon) Ali Hamadeh / (Canada) Bobby Kokavec (qualified)
4. (Croatia) Ivan Ljubičić / (Russia) Marat Safin (qualifying competition)

=== Qualifiers ===
1. (Lebanon) Ali Hamadeh / (Canada) Bobby Kokavec
2. (Switzerland) Roger Federer / (Netherlands) Sander Groen

=== Qualifying draw ===
==== First qualifier ====
First round
1	(United Kingdom) Barry Cowan (South Africa) Wesley Whitehouse	6	7
WC	(Georgia (country)) Irakli Labadze (Denmark) Kristian Pless	4	6
WC	(United States) Martin Blackman (United States) H'Cone Thompson	1	1
3	(Lebanon) Ali Hamadeh (Canada) Bobby Kokavec	6	6

Qualifying competition
1	(United Kingdom) Barry Cowan (South Africa) Wesley Whitehouse	6	7	6
3	(Lebanon) Ali Hamadeh (Canada) Bobby Kokavec	7	5	7

==== Second qualifier ====
First round
2	(Switzerland) Roger Federer (Netherlands) Sander Groen	7	6
(United Kingdom) Kyle Spencer (Netherlands) Peter Wessels	6	2
WC	(United States) James Blake (United States) Thomas Blake	6	6
4	(Croatia) Ivan Ljubičić (Russia) Marat Safin	7	7

Qualifying competition
2	(Switzerland) Roger Federer (Netherlands) Sander Groen	3	6	6
4	(Croatia) Ivan Ljubičić (Russia) Marat Safin	6	3	2
