= Paul Harsanyi =

American tennis player

- Full name: Paul Laszlo Harsanyi
- Country (sports): United States
- Born: December 30, 1974 (age 51)
- Prize money: $11,142

Singles
- Career record: 0–3
- Highest ranking: No. 751 (June 7, 1999)

Doubles
- Career record: 0–2
- Highest ranking: No. 1191 (August 21, 2000)

Paul Laszlo Harsanyi (born December 30, 1974) is an American former professional tennis player.

Harsanyi, who is of Hungarian descent, grew up in Potomac, Maryland and attended Churchill High School.

From 1993 to 1997, Harsanyi played varsity tennis for the University of North Carolina, where as a freshman he was named ACC Rookie of the Year in 1994.

While competing on the professional tour after college he made three ATP Tour main draw appearances at the Legg Mason Tennis Classic in Washington D.C.
