= 1995 Tel Aviv Open – Singles =

Singles
- 1995 Tel Aviv Open

Final
- Champion: (Slovakia) Ján Krošlák
- Runner-up: (Spain) Javier Sánchez
- Score: 6–3, 6–4

Details
- Draw: 32
- Seeds: 8

Events
Singles	Doubles
← 1994 ·	Tel Aviv Open	· 1996 →

Wayne Ferreira was the defending champion, but did not participate this year.

Ján Krošlák won the tournament, beating Javier Sánchez in the final, 6–3, 6–4.

== Seeds ==
1. (Austria) Thomas Muster (second round)
2. (Italy) Andrea Gaudenzi (first round)
3. (Spain) Javier Sánchez (final)
4. (United States) David Wheaton (semifinals)
5. (United States) Jared Palmer (quarterfinals)
6. (Morocco) Karim Alami (second round)
7. (Italy) Stefano Pescosolido (semifinals)
8. (Australia) Jason Stoltenberg (quarterfinals)

== Draw ==
=== Key ===
- Q = Qualifier
- WC = Wild card
- LL = Lucky loser
- Alt = Alternate
- SE = Special exempt
- PR = Protected ranking
- ITF = ITF entry
- JE = Junior exempt
- w/o = Walkover
- r = Retired
- d = Defaulted
- SR = Special ranking

=== Finals ===
Semifinals
7	(Italy) Stefano Pescosolido	2	7^{7}	6^{8}
3	(Spain) Javier Sánchez	6	6^{5}	7^{10}
4	(United States) David Wheaton	2	6	4
(Slovakia) Ján Krošlák	6	1	6

Final
3	(Spain) Javier Sánchez	3	4
(Slovakia) Ján Krošlák	6	6

=== Top half ===
First round
1	(Austria) T Muster	6^{5}	6	6
(Germany) J Renzenbrink	7^{7}	3	4
(France) R Gilbert	6^{5}	4
(Denmark) F Fetterlein	7^{7}	6
(Hungary) S Noszály	4	4
(Germany) A Thoms	6	6
(Belgium) J Van Herck	3	6	4
7	(Italy) S Pescosolido	6	3	6
3	(Spain) J Sánchez	6	6
(Germany) O Gross	4	2
WC	(Israel) E Ran	6	6
Q	(Zimbabwe) W Black	3	1
(United Kingdom) C Wilkinson	4	3
(Australia) R Fromberg	6	6
(Portugal) N Marques	2	3
5	(United States) J Palmer	6	6

Second round
1	(Austria) T Muster	2	7^{7}	1
(Denmark) F Fetterlein	6	6^{1}	6
(Germany) A Thoms	3	6^{2}
7	(Italy) S Pescosolido	6	7^{7}
3	(Spain) J Sánchez	3	7	7
WC	(Israel) E Ran	6	5	5
(Australia) R Fromberg	6^{7}	5
5	(United States) J Palmer	7^{7}	7

Quarterfinals
(Denmark) F Fetterlein	3	6^{8}
7	(Italy) S Pescosolido	6	7^{10}
3	(Spain) J Sánchez	7^{7}	6
5	(United States) J Palmer	6^{5}	3

Semifinals
7	(Italy) S Pescosolido	2	7^{7}	6^{8}
3	(Spain) J Sánchez	6	6^{5}	7^{10}

=== Bottom half ===
First round
6	(Morocco) K Alami	6	6
WC	(Israel) E Erlich	0	2
(Czech Republic) R Vašek	6	1	7^{7}
(United States) J Grabb	2	6	6^{4}
Q	(Israel) N Behr	6	3	7
(United States) J Tarango	4	6	5
Q	(Germany) R Schüttler	4	5
4	(United States) D Wheaton	6	7
8	(Australia) J Stoltenberg	6	6
WC	(Israel) G Bloom	3	3
(Poland) W Kowalski	4	4
(South Africa) M Ondruska	6	6
(Slovakia) J Krošlák	6	4	6
(France) T Guardiola	0	6	3
Q	(Uzbekistan) O Ogorodov	6^{1}	6	7^{9}
2	(Italy) A Gaudenzi	7^{7}	4	6^{7}

Second round
6	(Morocco) K Alami	3	4
(Czech Republic) R Vašek	6	6
Q	(Israel) N Behr	7^{7}	3	6^{10}
4	(United States) D Wheaton	6^{4}	6	7^{12}
8	(Australia) J Stoltenberg	2	7^{8}	6
(South Africa) M Ondruska	6	6^{6}	1
(Slovakia) J Krošlák	6^{12}	7	6
Q	(Uzbekistan) O Ogorodov	7^{14}	5	3

Quarterfinals
(Czech Republic) R Vašek	2	0
4	(United States) D Wheaton	6	6
8	(Australia) J Stoltenberg	6	3	4
(Slovakia) J Krošlák	1	6	6

Semifinals
4	(United States) D Wheaton	2	6	4
(Slovakia) J Krošlák	6	1	6
