= 1996 ATP Challenger Series =

Tennis tour

Details
- Duration: 22 January 1996 – 15 December 1996
- Edition: 19th
- Tournaments: 98

Achievements (singles)

The ATP Challenger Series is the second-tier tour for professional tennis organised by the Association of Tennis Professionals (ATP). The 1996 ATP Challenger Series calendar comprised 98 tournaments, with prize money ranging from $25,000 up to $125,000.

== Schedule ==
=== January ===
Date	Country	Tournament	Prizemoney	Surface	Singles champion	Doubles champions
22.01.	Germany	Heilbronn Open	$100,000	Carpet (i)	(United States) Chris Woodruff	(Switzerland) Lorenzo Manta (Czech Republic) Pavel Vízner
29.01.	Germany	Lippstadt Challenger	$ 25,000	Carpet (i)	(Germany) Hendrik Dreekmann	(United States) T. J. Middleton (United States) Chris Woodruff

=== February ===
Date	Country	Tournament	Prizemoney	Surface	Singles champion	Doubles champions
05.02.	Germany	Volkswagen Challenger	$ 25,000	Carpet (i)	(Italy) Gianluca Pozzi	(Germany) Dirk Dier (Germany) Arne Thoms
12.02.	Germany	Hambühren Challenger	$ 25,000	Carpet (i)	(Germany) Jens Knippschild	(United States) Jim Pugh (Netherlands) Joost Winnink
19.02.	France	Cherbourg Challenger	$ 50,000	Hard (i)	(Sweden) Magnus Gustafsson	(South Africa) Marius Barnard (United States) Bill Behrens
19.02.	Uruguay	Punta del Este Challenger	$ 25,000	Clay	(Spain) Félix Mantilla	(Brazil) Gustavo Kuerten (Brazil) Jaime Oncins
26.02.	Germany	Warsteiner Challenger	$125,000	Carpet (i)	(Denmark) Kenneth Carlsen	(Czech Republic) Tomáš Krupa (Czech Republic) Pavel Vízner
26.02.	Ecuador	Salinas Challenger	$ 25,000	Hard	(Spain) Óscar Martínez	(Venezuela) Juan Carlos Bianchi (Ivory Coast) Claude N'Goran

=== March ===
Date	Country	Tournament	Prizemoney	Surface	Singles champion	Doubles champions
04.03.	United States	Indian Wells Challenger	$ 50,000	Hard	(Australia) Jason Stoltenberg	(United States) Brett Hansen-Dent (United States) Brian MacPhie
04.03.	Sweden	Bromma Challenger	$ 25,000	Hard (i)	(Belgium) Johan Van Herck	(United Kingdom) Andrew Foster (United Kingdom) Danny Sapsford
18.03.	Morocco	Agadir Challenger	$ 50,000	Clay	(Norway) Christian Ruud	(United States) Jared Palmer (South Africa) Christo van Rensburg

=== April ===
Date	Country	Tournament	Prizemoney	Surface	Singles champion	Doubles champions
01.04.	United States	West Bloomfield Challenger	$ 50,000	Hard (i)	(South Africa) Grant Stafford	(Sweden) Rikard Bergh (United States) Shelby Cannon
01.04.	Mexico	Puerto Vallarta Challenger	$ 25,000	Hard	(United States) Geoff Grant	(United States) Francisco Montana (United States) Jack Waite
08.04.	Italy	Napoli Challenger	$ 75,000	Clay	(Spain) Félix Mantilla	(Italy) Omar Camporese (Italy) Diego Nargiso
08.04.	Japan	Nagoya Challenger	$ 50,000	Hard	(Zimbabwe) Kevin Ullyett	(Japan) Satoshi Iwabuchi (Japan) Takao Suzuki
15.04.	Malta	Malta Challenger	$ 25,000	Hard	(Morocco) Hicham Arazi	(Mexico) Alejandro Hernández (Mexico) Óscar Ortiz
22.04.	United States	Birmingham Challenger	$ 75,000	Clay	(Argentina) Mariano Zabaleta	(Argentina) Javier Frana (Czech Republic) Karel Nováček
22.04.	Uzbekistan	Fergana Challenger	$ 25,000	Hard	(France) Stéphane Simian	(India) Mahesh Bhupathi (India) Leander Paes
22.04.	Czech Republic	Prague Challenger	$ 25,000	Clay	(Spain) Galo Blanco	(United States) Donald Johnson (United States) Francisco Montana
29.04.	Uzbekistan	Andijan Challenger	$ 25,000	Hard	(South Africa) Grant Stafford	(United States) Geoff Grant (Venezuela) Maurice Ruah

=== May ===
Date	Country	Tournament	Prizemoney	Surface	Singles champion	Doubles champions
06.05.	Slovenia	Ljubljana Challenger	$125,000	Clay	(Morocco) Hicham Arazi	(Argentina) Pablo Albano (Argentina) Lucas Arnold Ker
06.05.	Israel	Jerusalem Challenger	$ 50,000	Hard	(South Africa) Grant Stafford	(India) Neville Godwin (India) Leander Paes
06.05.	Slovakia	Bratislava Challenger	$ 25,000	Clay	(Czech Republic) David Škoch	(Argentina) Marcelo Charpentier (Brazil) Gustavo Kuerten
13.05.	Germany	Ostdeutscher Sparkassen Cup	$ 50,000	Clay	(Sweden) Patrik Fredriksson	(Sweden) Ola Kristiansson (Sweden) Mårten Renström
20.05.	Hungary	Budapest Challenger I	$ 75,000	Clay	(Argentina) Hernán Gumy	(Portugal) Nuno Marques (Belgium) Tom Vanhoudt
27.05.	Poland	Szczecin Challenger	$ 50,000	Clay	(Venezuela) Jimy Szymanski	(Belgium) Tom Vanhoudt (Netherlands) Fernon Wibier

=== June ===
Date	Country	Tournament	Prizemoney	Surface	Singles champion	Doubles champions
03.06.	Germany	Quelle Cup	$100,000	Clay	(Morocco) Hicham Arazi	(Australia) Joshua Eagle (Netherlands) Tom Kempers
03.06.	Austria	Annenheim Challenger	$ 50,000	Grass	(Germany) Alex Rădulescu	(Australia) Sandon Stolle (Australia) Michael Tebbutt
03.06.	Colombia	Medellín Challenger	$ 25,000	Clay	(Colombia) Mauricio Hadad	(Ecuador) Pablo Campana (Egypt) Tamer El-Sawy
10.06.	Colombia	Cali Challenger	$ 50,000	Clay	(Colombia) Mauricio Hadad	(United States) Brett Hansen-Dent (United States) T. J. Middleton
10.06.	Croatia	Zagreb Challenger	$ 50,000	Clay	(Armenia) Sargis Sargsian	(United States) Donald Johnson (United States) Jack Waite
10.06.	Germany	ATU Cup	$ 25,000	Clay	(Sweden) Tomas Nydahl	(United States) Jon Leach (Italy) Mosé Navarra
17.06.	Slovakia	Košice Challenger	$125,000	Clay	(Spain) Marcos Górriz	(France) Olivier Delaître (United States) Jeff Tarango
17.06.	Colombia	Bogotá Challenger	$ 50,000	Clay	(Brazil) Roberto Jabali	(United States) Brett Hansen-Dent (United States) T. J. Middleton
17.06.	Germany	Wartburg Open	$ 25,000	Clay	(Netherlands) Dennis van Scheppingen	(United States) Donald Johnson (United States) Francisco Montana
24.06.	Germany	Nord/LB Open	$125,000	Clay	(Spain) Alberto Berasategui	(Germany) Karsten Braasch (Germany) Jens Knippschild

=== July ===
Date	Country	Tournament	Prizemoney	Surface	Singles champion	Doubles champions
01.07.	Italy	Venice Challenger	$100,000	Clay	(Spain) Alberto Berasategui	(Italy) Federico Mordegan (Italy) Vincenzo Santopadre
01.07.	Germany	Müller Cup	$ 50,000	Clay	(Belgium) Kris Goossens	(Germany) Karsten Braasch (Germany) Jens Knippschild
01.07.	France	Montauban Challenger	$ 25,000	Clay	(Romania) Andrei Pavel	(France) Gilles Bastié (Ivory Coast) Claude N'Goran
08.07.	Belgium	Ostend Challenger	$ 75,000	Clay	(France) Thierry Champion	(Argentina) Lucas Arnold Ker (Czech Republic) David Škoch
08.07.	Great Britain	Bristol Challenger	$ 50,000	Grass	(Australia) Ben Ellwood	(Czech Republic) Petr Pála (United Kingdom) Andrew Richardson
08.07.	Brazil	São Paulo Challenger	$ 50,000	Hard	(Brazil) Roberto Jabali	(Mexico) Alejandro Hernández (Mexico) Òscar Ortiz
08.07.	Germany	Oberstaufen Cup	$ 25,000	Clay	(Germany) Jens Knippschild	(Germany) Karsten Braasch (Germany) Jens Knippschild
15.07.	Great Britain	Manchester Challenger	$ 50,000	Grass	(Australia) Ben Ellwood	(Belarus) Max Mirnyi (Israel) Lior Mor
15.07.	Ecuador	Quito Challenger	$ 50,000	Clay	(Ecuador) Pablo Campana	(Ecuador) Pablo Campana (Ecuador) Nicolás Lapentti
15.07.	Netherlands	Scheveningen Challenger	$ 50,000	Clay	(Netherlands) Dennis van Scheppingen	(United States) Brandon Coupe (South Africa) Paul Rosner
15.07.	Finland	Tampere Challenger	$ 50,000	Clay	(Hungary) Attila Sávolt	(United States) Donald Johnson (United States) Francisco Montana
22.07.	United States	Aptos Challenger	$ 50,000	Hard	(Canada) Albert Chang	(Canada) Sébastien Leblanc (Canada) Jocelyn Robichaud
29.07.	Turkey	Istanbul Challenger	$100,000	Hard	(Spain) Ignacio Truyol	(United Kingdom) Mark Petchey (United Kingdom) Danny Sapsford
29.07.	Italy	Merano Challenger	$ 75,000	Clay	(Spain) Juan Albert Viloca	(Portugal) João Cunha e Silva (Portugal) Nuno Marques
29.07.	United States	Lexington Challenger	$ 50,000	Hard	(United States) Steve Bryan	(United States) Geoff Grant (South Africa) Grant Stafford

=== August ===
Date	Country	Tournament	Prizemoney	Surface	Singles champion	Doubles champions
05.08.	Spain	Open Castilla y León	$100,000	Hard	(France) Jérôme Golmard	(Spain) Jordi Burillo (Spain) Emilio Sánchez
05.08.	United States	Binghamton Challenger	$ 50,000	Hard	(Italy) Vincenzo Santopadre	(United States) Justin Gimelstob (United States) Jeff Salzenstein
05.08.	Brazil	Belo Horizonte Challenger	$ 25,000	Hard	(Brazil) Jaime Oncins	(Mexico) Leonardo Lavalle (Venezuela) Maurice Ruah
05.08.	Czech Republic	Pilzen Challenger	$ 25,000	Clay	(Slovakia) Dominik Hrbatý	(Czech Republic) Jan Kodeš Jr. (Czech Republic) Petr Luxa
12.08.	Poland	Poznań Challenger	$100,000	Clay	(France) Thierry Champion	(Italy) Cristian Brandi (Italy) Filippo Messori
12.08.	United States	Bronx Challenger	$ 50,000	Hard	(Egypt) Tamer El-Sawy	(United States) David DiLucia (United States) Scott Humphries
12.08.	Spain	Alicante Challenger	$ 25,000	Clay	(Spain) Juan Albert Viloca	(Spain) José Antonio Conde (Portugal) Nuno Marques
19.08.	Austria	Graz Challenger	$125,000	Clay	(Spain) Juan Albert Viloca	(Argentina) Pablo Albano (Hungary) László Markovits
19.08.	Switzerland	Geneva Challenger	$ 50,000	Clay	(Argentina) Marcelo Charpentier	(Germany) Patrick Baur (Germany) Jens Knippschild
26.08.	Germany	Alpirsbach Challenger	$ 25,000	Clay	(Sweden) Magnus Norman	(Germany) Karsten Braasch (Germany) Jens Knippschild
26.08.	Uzbekistan	Samarkand Challenger	$ 25,000	Clay	(Spain) Juan Antonio Marín	(Puerto Rico) José Frontera (Uzbekistan) Oleg Ogorodov

=== September ===
Date	Country	Tournament	Prizemoney	Surface	Singles champion	Doubles champions
02.09.	Aruba	Aruba Challenger	$125,000	Hard	(United States) Vince Spadea	(India) Mahesh Bhupathi (India) Leander Paes
02.09.	Uzbekistan	Tashkent Challenger	$125,000	Clay	(Spain) Félix Mantilla	(Argentina) Marcelo Charpentier (Spain) Albert Portas
02.09.	Czech Republic	Prostějov Challenger	$ 75,000	Clay	(Russia) Andrei Cherkasov	(Germany) Mathias Huning (United States) Jack Waite
02.09.	Portugal	Azores Challenger	$ 50,000	Hard	(Portugal) Nuno Marques	(Netherlands) Marcus Hilpert (Germany) Christian Saceanu
02.09.	Romania	Brașov Challenger	$ 50,000	Clay	(Romania) Dinu Pescariu	(Romania) George Cosac (Romania) Dinu Pescariu
09.09.	Hungary	Budapest Challenger II	$ 50,000	Clay	(Romania) Răzvan Sabău	(Hungary) László Markovits (Hungary) Attila Sávolt
09.09.	Italy	Olbia Challenger	$ 50,000	Hard	(Italy) Omar Camporese	(Italy) Nicola Bruno (France) Stéphane Simian
09.09.	India	Chennai Challenger	$ 25,000	Hard	(Uzbekistan) Oleg Ogorodov	(India) Mahesh Bhupathi (India) Leander Paes
16.09.	Yugoslavia	Budva Challenger	$ 75,000	Clay	(Bulgaria) Orlin Stanoytchev	(Federal Republic of Yugoslavia) Nebojša Đorđević (North Macedonia) Aleksandar Kitinov
16.09.	Portugal	Oporto Challenger	$ 75,000	Clay	(Australia) Richard Fromberg	(Portugal) Emanuel Couto (Portugal) Nuno Marques
16.09.	Germany	Bad Saarow Challenger	$ 50,000	Clay	(Sweden) Magnus Norman	(Germany) Jens Knippschild (South Africa) Marcos Ondruska
23.09.	United States	Urbana Challenger	$ 50,000	Hard (i)	(United States) Justin Gimelstob	(United States) David DiLucia (United States) Scott Humphries
23.09.	China	Beijing Challenger	$ 25,000	Hard	(South Korea) Yoon Yong-il	(India) Mahesh Bhupathi (Australia) Peter Tramacchi
23.09.	Spain	Copa Sevilla	$ 25,000	Clay	(Spain) Francisco Roig	(Sweden) Ola Kristiansson (Belgium) Tom Vanhoudt
23.09.	North Macedonia	Skopje Challenger	$ 25,000	Clay	(Sweden) Lars Jönsson	(Federal Republic of Yugoslavia) Nebojša Đorđević (North Macedonia) Aleksandar Kitinov
30.09.	Mexico	Monterrey Challenger	$100,000	Hard	(Zimbabwe) Kevin Ullyett	(Armenia) Sargis Sargsian (United States) Michael Sell

=== October ===
Date	Country	Tournament	Prizemoney	Surface	Singles champion	Doubles champions
07.10.	Spain	Barcelona Challenger	$125,000	Clay	(Uruguay) Marcelo Filippini	Not completed
14.10.	Egypt	Cairo Challenger	$ 50,000	Clay	(Brazil) Fernando Meligeni	(Spain) Alberto Berasategui (Spain) Germán Puentes
14.10.	Spain	Mallorca Challenger	$ 50,000	Clay	(Slovakia) Dominik Hrbatý	(Italy) Cristian Brandi (Italy) Filippo Messori
14.10.	Japan	Tanagura Challenger	$ 25,000	Hard	(Sweden) Patrik Fredriksson	(United States) Brian MacPhie (The Bahamas) Roger Smith
21.10.	France	Brest Challenger	$100,000	Hard (i)	(France) Guillaume Raoux	(United States) Donald Johnson (United States) Mark Keil
21.10.	South Korea	Seoul Challenger	$ 50,000	Clay	(Brazil) Jaime Oncins	(South Korea) Lee Hyung-taik (South Korea) Yoon Yong-il
28.10.	Germany	Lambertz Open by STAWAG	$ 50,000	Hard (i)	(Russia) Alexander Volkov	(South Africa) Robbie Koenig (Uzbekistan) Oleg Ogorodov
28.10.	India	Ahmedabad Challenger	$ 25,000	Clay	(Portugal) Nuno Marques	(India) Mahesh Bhupathi (India) Leander Paes

=== November ===
Date	Country	Tournament	Prizemoney	Surface	Singles champion	Doubles champions
04.11.	Germany	Neumünster Challenger	$ 25,000	Carpet (i)	(Germany) Arne Thoms	(Netherlands) Stephen Noteboom (Netherlands) Fernon Wibier
11.11.	Andorra	Andorra Challenger	$100,000	Hard (i)	(United States) Justin Gimelstob	(Spain) Tomás Carbonell (Spain) Francisco Roig
11.11.	Brazil	Campinas Challenger	$ 50,000	Clay	(Brazil) Gustavo Kuerten	(Brazil) Gustavo Kuerten (Brazil) Fernando Meligeni
11.11.	Réunion	Réunion Challenger	$ 50,000	Hard	(Sweden) Patrik Fredriksson	(Netherlands) Hendrik Jan Davids (France) Fabrice Santoro
18.11.	United States	Austin Challenger	$ 25,000	Hard	(Armenia) Sargis Sargsian	(Armenia) Sargis Sargsian (United States) Michael Sell
18.11.	Mauritius	Mauritius Challenger	$ 25,000	Grass	(India) Leander Paes	(Germany) Patrick Baur (Netherlands) Joost Winnink
18.11.	Slovenia	Portorož Challenger	$ 25,000	Hard	(Italy) Gianluca Pozzi	(Federal Republic of Yugoslavia) Nebojša Đorđević (North Macedonia) Aleksandar Kitinov
18.11.	Mexico	Puebla Challenger	$ 25,000	Hard	(Mexico) Alejandro Hernández	(Mexico) Leonardo Lavalle (Venezuela) Maurice Ruah
25.11.	United States	Amarillo Challenger	$ 50,000	Hard (i)	(Armenia) Sargis Sargsian	(Belarus) Max Mirnyi (Zimbabwe) Kevin Ullyett

=== December ===
Date	Country	Tournament	Prizemoney	Surface	Singles champion	Doubles champions
02.12.	United States	Daytona Beach Challenger	$ 50,000	Hard	(Russia) Andrei Cherkasov	(United States) Justin Gimelstob (United States) Jeff Salzenstein
02.12.	Chile	Santiago Challenger	$ 25,000	Clay	(Argentina) Guillermo Cañas	(Argentina) Gastón Etlis (Argentina) Martín Rodríguez
09.12.	Australia	Perth Challenger	$ 25,000	Hard	(Australia) Richard Fromberg	(Australia) Jamie Holmes (Australia) Andrew Painter
