= 1995 Tel Aviv Open – Doubles =

Doubles
- 1995 Tel Aviv Open

Final
- Champions: (United States) Jim Grabb (United States) Jared Palmer
- Runners-up: (United States) Kent Kinnear (United States) David Wheaton
- Score: 6–4, 7–5

Details
- Draw: 16
- Seeds: 4

Events
Singles	Doubles
← 1994 ·	Tel Aviv Open	· 1996 →

Lan Bale and John-Laffnie de Jager were the defending champions, but did not participate together this year. Bale partnered Wayne Black, losing in the semifinals. de Jager partnered Christo van Rensburg, losing in the first round.

Jim Grabb and Jared Palmer won the title, defeating Kent Kinnear and David Wheaton 6–4, 7–5 in the final.

== Seeds ==
1. (United States) Jim Grabb / (United States) Jared Palmer (champions)
2. (Netherlands) Hendrik Jan Davids / (South Africa) Piet Norval (quarterfinals)
3. (United States) Kent Kinnear / (United States) David Wheaton (final)
4. (France) Rodolphe Gilbert / (Portugal) Nuno Marques (first round)

== Draw ==
=== Key ===
- Q = Qualifier
- WC = Wild card
- LL = Lucky loser
- Alt = Alternate
- SE = Special exempt
- PR = Protected ranking
- ITF = ITF entry
- JE = Junior exempt
- w/o = Walkover
- r = Retired
- d = Defaulted
- SR = Special ranking

=== Draw ===
First round
1	(United States) J Grabb (United States) J Palmer	6	7
(Netherlands) T Kempers (Netherlands) S Noteboom	4	5
(United States) J Tarango (United States) J Waite	3	7	7
WC	(Italy) A Gaudenzi (Austria) T Muster	6	5	5
4	(France) R Gilbert (Portugal) N Marques	3	3
(South Africa) M Barnard (South Africa) B Haygarth	6	6
WC	(Israel) E Ran (Israel) N Behr	7	6	6
LL	(Australia) B Larkham (Germany) A Thoms	5	7	7
(Australia) W Arthurs (South Africa) M Ondruska	7	4	6
(United States) M Bauer (United States) B Behrens	5	6	4
Q	(Germany) P Baur (Germany) J Renzenbrink	4	6
3	(United States) K Kinnear (United States) D Wheaton	6	7
(South Africa) L Bale (Zimbabwe) W Black	7	7
WC	(Israel) A Hadad (Israel) H Levy	5	6
(South Africa) J-L de Jager (South Africa) C van Rensburg	6	3
2	(Netherlands) HJ Davids (South Africa) P Norval	7	6

Quarterfinals
1	(United States) J Grabb (United States) J Palmer	7	6
(United States) J Tarango (United States) J Waite	6	4
(South Africa) M Barnard (South Africa) B Haygarth	4	7	4
LL	(Australia) B Larkham (Germany) A Thoms	6	5	6
(Australia) W Arthurs (South Africa) M Ondruska	1	6
3	(United States) K Kinnear (United States) D Wheaton	6	7
(South Africa) L Bale (Zimbabwe) W Black	3	6	7
2	(Netherlands) HJ Davids (South Africa) P Norval	6	0	5

Semifinals
1	(United States) J Grabb (United States) J Palmer	6	6
LL	(Australia) B Larkham (Germany) A Thoms	3	3
3	(United States) K Kinnear (United States) D Wheaton	6	4	6
(South Africa) L Bale (Zimbabwe) W Black	3	6	3

Final
1	(United States) J Grabb (United States) J Palmer	6	7
3	(United States) K Kinnear (United States) D Wheaton	4	5
