= 1996 Eisenberg Israel Open – Doubles =

Doubles
- 1996 Eisenberg Israel Open

Final
- Champions: (South Africa) Marcos Ondruska (South Africa) Grant Stafford
- Runners-up: (Israel) Noam Behr (Israel) Eyal Erlich
- Score: 6–3, 6–2

Details
- Draw: 16
- Seeds: 4

Events
Singles	Doubles
← 1995 ·	Eisenberg Israel Open	· 2022 →

Jim Grabb and Jared Palmer were the defending champions but did not compete that year.

Marcos Ondruska and Grant Stafford won in the final 6–3, 6–2 against Noam Behr and Eyal Erlich.

== Seeds ==
1. (Argentina) Luis Lobo / (Spain) Javier Sánchez (first round)
2. (Australia) Andrew Kratzmann / (Australia) Michael Tebbutt (first round)
3. (France) Jean-Philippe Fleurian / (Venezuela) Nicolás Pereira (semifinals)
4. (India) Mahesh Bhupathi / (United States) Kent Kinnear (first round)

== Draw ==
=== Key ===
- Q = Qualifier
- WC = Wild card
- LL = Lucky loser
- Alt = Alternate
- SE = Special exempt
- PR = Protected ranking
- ITF = ITF entry
- JE = Junior exempt
- w/o = Walkover
- r = Retired
- d = Defaulted
- SR = Special ranking

First round
1	(Argentina) L Lobo (Spain) J Sánchez	4	0
(South Africa) M Ondruska (South Africa) G Stafford	6	6
(Uzbekistan) O Ogorodov (Italy) S Pescosolido	7	6	4
(Germany) M Huning (Australia) J Ireland	5	7	6
4	(India) M Bhupathi (United States) K Kinnear	3	5
(United States) M Keil (Canada) S Leblanc	6	7
(South Africa) B Haygarth (United States) G Van Emburgh	6	6
WC	(Israel) L Mor (Israel) N Welgreen	4	0
(South Africa) C Ferreira (Israel) E Ran	6	3	2
Q	(Israel) A Hadad (Israel) H Levy	1	6	6
(Australia) S Draper (France) S Simian	6	5
3	(France) J-P Fleurian (Venezuela) N Pereira	7	7
WC	(Spain) A Costa (Spain) F Mantilla	7	7
(Brazil) G Kuerten (Armenia) S Sargsian	5	6
WC	(Israel) N Behr (Israel) E Erlich	6	6
2	(Australia) A Kratzmann (Australia) M Tebbutt	4	4

Quarterfinals
(South Africa) M Ondruska (South Africa) G Stafford	7	6
(Germany) M Huning (Australia) J Ireland	6	1
(United States) M Keil (Canada) S Leblanc	6	3	1^{d}
(South Africa) B Haygarth (United States) G Van Emburgh	3	6	0
Q	(Israel) A Hadad (Israel) H Levy	3	1
3	(France) J-P Fleurian (Venezuela) N Pereira	6	6
WC	(Spain) A Costa (Spain) F Mantilla	5	6
WC	(Israel) N Behr (Israel) E Erlich	7	7

Semifinals
(South Africa) M Ondruska (South Africa) G Stafford	6	6
(South Africa) B Haygarth (United States) G Van Emburgh	3	2
3	(France) J-P Fleurian (Venezuela) N Pereira	4	6	6
WC	(Israel) N Behr (Israel) E Erlich	6	1	7

Final
(South Africa) M Ondruska (South Africa) G Stafford	6	6
WC	(Israel) N Behr (Israel) E Erlich	3	2
