= 1996 Eisenberg Israel Open – Singles =

Singles
- 1996 Eisenberg Israel Open

Final
- Champion: (Spain) Javier Sánchez
- Runner-up: (South Africa) Marcos Ondruska
- Score: 6–4, 7–5

Details
- Draw: 32
- Seeds: 8

Events
Singles	Doubles
- Eisenberg Israel Open

Ján Krošlák was the defending champion but did not compete that year.

Javier Sánchez won in the final 6–4, 7–5 against Marcos Ondruska.

== Seeds ==
1. (United States) MaliVai Washington (semifinals)
2. (Spain) Albert Costa (semifinals)
3. (Spain) Félix Mantilla (second round)
4. (Spain) Javier Sánchez (champion)
5. (Argentina) Hernán Gumy (quarterfinals)
6. (Argentina) Javier Frana (quarterfinals)
7. (South Africa) Grant Stafford (quarterfinals)
8. (Australia) Scott Draper (quarterfinals)

== Draw ==
Key

- Q = Qualifier
- WC = Wild card
- LL = Lucky loser
- Alt = Alternate
- ITF = ITF entry
- PR = Protected ranking
- SR = Special ranking
- SE = Special exempt
- JE = Junior exempt
- JR = Junior Accelerator Programme entrant
- CO = College Accelerator Programme entrant
- NG = Next Gen Accelerator Program entrant
- w/o = Walkover
- r = Retired
- d = Defaulted

=== Finals ===
Semifinals
1	(United States) MaliVai Washington	4	3
4	(Spain) Javier Sánchez	6	6
(South Africa) Marcos Ondruska	6	4	7^{7}
2	(Spain) Albert Costa	4	6	6^{4}

Final
4	(Spain) Javier Sánchez	6	7
(South Africa) Marcos Ondruska	4	5

=== Top half ===
First round
1	(United States) M Washington	6	6
(France) S Simian	1	4
WC	(Israel) N Behr	4	3
Q	(Germany) M Sinner	6	6
(Italy) S Pescosolido	3	5
(Brazil) G Kuerten	6	7
Q	(South Africa) D Nainkin	2	6^{3}
7	(South Africa) G Stafford	6	7^{7}
4	(Spain) J Sánchez	6	6
WC	(Israel) N Welgreen	4	3
(Armenia) S Sargsian	6	6
Q	(United States) J Gimelstob	3	1
(Canada) D Nestor	6^{4}	6	6^{11}
(Uruguay) M Filippini	7^{7}	4	7^{13}
(Spain) G Blanco	6	5	4
6	(Argentina) J Frana	1	7	6

Second round
1	(United States) M Washington	6	6
Q	(Germany) M Sinner	1	4
(Brazil) G Kuerten	4	3
7	(South Africa) G Stafford	6	6
4	(Spain) J Sánchez	6	7^{7}
(Armenia) S Sargsian	2	6^{5}
(Uruguay) M Filippini	1^{r}
6	(Argentina) J Frana	3

Quarterfinals
1	(United States) M Washington	4	7^{7}	6
7	(South Africa) G Stafford	6	6^{0}	4
4	(Spain) J Sánchez	6	3	6
6	(Argentina) J Frana	2	6	3

Semifinals
1	(United States) M Washington	4	3
4	(Spain) J Sánchez	6	6

=== Bottom half ===
First round
5	(Argentina) H Gumy	6	6
(Ecuador) L Morejón	3	3
(Australia) R Fromberg	6	1	7^{7}
Q	(Sweden) L Jonsson	4	6	6^{3}
(South Africa) M Ondruska	3	7^{7}	7^{7}
(Australia) M Tebbutt	6	6^{2}	6^{1}
(Spain) I Truyol	3	4
3	(Spain) F Mantilla	6	6
8	(Australia) S Draper	6	6
(France) J-P Fleurian	4	4
(Spain) M A Gorriz	2	3
(Venezuela) N Pereira	6	6
(Belgium) J van Herck	6	6
(Uzbekistan) O Ogorodov	4	4
WC	(Israel) E Ran	4	2
2	(Spain) A Costa	6	6

Second round
5	(Argentina) H Gumy	6	7
(Australia) R Fromberg	4	5
(South Africa) M Ondruska	7	6
3	(Spain) F Mantilla	5	4
8	(Australia) S Draper	6	4	7
(Venezuela) N Pereira	3	6	5
(Belgium) J van Herck	6	4	2
2	(Spain) A Costa	3	6	6

Quarterfinals
5	(Argentina) H Gumy	6	2	5
(South Africa) M Ondruska	3	6	7
8	(Australia) S Draper	2	7^{7}	4
2	(Spain) A Costa	6	6^{1}	6

Semifinals
(South Africa) M Ondruska	6	4	7^{7}
2	(Spain) A Costa	4	6	6^{4}
