= 1998 U.S. Men's Clay Court Championships – Singles =

Singles
- 1998 U.S. Men's Clay Court Championships

Final
- Champion: (United States) Jim Courier
- Runner-up: (United States) Michael Chang
- Score: 7–5, 3–6, 7–5

Details
- Draw: 32
- Seeds: 8

Events
Singles	Doubles
- U.S. Men's Clay Court Championships

== Seeds ==
A champion seed is indicated in bold text while text in italics indicates the round in which that seed was eliminated.

1. (United States) Michael Chang (final)
2. (Australia) Jason Stoltenberg (first round)
3. (United States) **Jim Courier (champion)**
4. (United States) Vincent Spadea (first round)
5. (Italy) Gianluca Pozzi (second round)
6. (Zimbabwe) Wayne Black (first round)
7. (South Africa) Grant Stafford (second round)
8. (Costa Rica) Juan Antonio Marín (first round, retired)

== Draw ==
Key

- Q = Qualifier
- WC = Wild card
- LL = Lucky loser
- Alt = Alternate
- ITF = ITF entry
- PR = Protected ranking
- SR = Special ranking
- SE = Special exempt
- JE = Junior exempt
- JR = Junior Accelerator Programme entrant
- CO = College Accelerator Programme entrant
- NG = Next Gen Accelerator Program entrant
- w/o = Walkover
- r = Retired
- d = Defaulted

First round
1	(United States) **M Chang**	**6**	3	**7^{7}**
(Paraguay) R Delgado	4	**6**	6^{1}
(Norway) C Ruud	3	4
(Argentina) **F Squillari**	**6**	**6**
Q	(Brazil) **M Carlsson**	**6**	**6**
Q	(Sweden) P Fredriksson	4	2
(Belgium) J Van Herck	3	1
7	(South Africa) **G Stafford**	**6**	**6**
4	(United States) V Spadea	4	2
Q	(Australia) **A Ilie**	**6**	**6**
(Argentina) **L Arnold Ker**	**7**	**6**
(Netherlands) J van Lottum	5	2
(Sweden) **M Tillström**	**6**	**6**
(Germany) C Vinck	3	2
(Armenia) S Sargsian	3	6^{4}
5	(Italy) **G Pozzi**	**6**	**7^{7}**
6	(Zimbabwe) W Black	6^{5}	2
(United States) **J-M Gambill**	**7^{7}**	**6**
WC	(United States) D Witt	3	1
(Germany) **M Craca**	**6**	**6**
(Italy) D Sanguinetti	3	**6**	2
Q	(Netherlands) **D van Scheppingen**	**6**	1	**6**
WC	(United States) G Grant	1	2
3	(United States) **J Courier**	**6**	**6**
8	(Costa Rica) J A Marín	3	0^{r}
(Spain) **Á Calatrava**	**6**	2
(Argentina) **H Gumy**	3	**6**	**6**
(United States) R Reneberg	**6**	4	0
(Australia) S Draper	5	0
(Romania) **A Pavel**	**7**	**6**
(United States) **J Gimelstob**	3	**6**	**6**
2	(Australia) J Stoltenberg	**6**	3	4

Second round
1	(United States) **M Chang**	**7^{7}**	**6**
(Argentina) F Squillari	6^{2}	4
Q	(Brazil) **M Carlsson**	**6**	3	**6**
7	(South Africa) G Stafford	4	**6**	2
Q	(Australia) **A Ilie**	**6**	**6**
(Argentina) L Arnold Ker	3	4
(Sweden) **M Tillström**	**6**	**6**
5	(Italy) G Pozzi	4	3
(United States) J-M Gambill	4	4
(Germany) **M Craca**	**6**	**6**
Q	(Netherlands) D van Scheppingen	2	1
3	(United States) **J Courier**	**6**	**6**
(Spain) **Á Calatrava**	4	**7^{7}**
(Argentina) H Gumy	**6**	6^{5}	r
(Romania) **A Pavel**	**7^{7}**	**6**
(United States) J Gimelstob	6^{5}	2

Quarterfinals
1	(United States) **M Chang**	**6**	**6**
Q	(Brazil) M Carlsson	3	1
Q	(Australia) A Ilie	3	3
(Sweden) **M Tillström**	**6**	**6**
(Germany) M Craca	0	3
3	(United States) **J Courier**	**6**	**6**
(Spain) Á Calatrava	4	**6**	4
(Romania) **A Pavel**	**6**	2	**6**

Semifinals
1	(United States) **M Chang**	**6**	**6**
(Sweden) M Tillström	3	4
3	(United States) **J Courier**	4	**6**	**6**
(Romania) A Pavel	**6**	3	2

Final
1	(United States) Michael Chang	5	**6**	5
3	(United States) **Jim Courier**	**7**	3	**7**
