= 1991 Thriftway ATP Championships – Doubles =

Doubles
- 1991 Thriftway ATP Championships

Final
- Champions: (United States) Ken Flach (United States) Robert Seguso
- Runners-up: (Canada) Grant Connell (Canada) Glenn Michibata
- Score: 6–7^{(3–7)}, 6–4 7–5

Details
- Draw: 28 (1WC/2Q)
- Seeds: 8

Events
Singles	Doubles
- Cincinnati Masters

Andre Agassi and Petr Korda were the defending champions, but Agassi chose not to participate. Korda played along Ivan Lendl, but lost in the first round to Neil Borwick and Simon Youl.

Ken Flach and Robert Seguso won the title defeating Grant Connell and Glenn Michibata in the finals, 6–7^{(3–7)}, 6–4 7–5.

== Seeds ==
The top four seeded teams received byes into the second round.

1. (Australia) John Fitzgerald / (Sweden) Anders Järryd (quarterfinals)
2. (United States) Scott Davis / (United States) David Pate (semifinals)
3. (Canada) Grant Connell / (Canada) Glenn Michibata (finals)
4. (United States) Pat Galbraith / (United States) Todd Witsken (second round)
5. (Australia) Mark Woodforde / (Australia) Todd Woodbridge (first round)
6. (South Africa) Gary Muller / (South Africa) Danie Visser (second round)
7. (France) Guy Forget / (Switzerland) Jakob Hlasek (first round)
8. (United States) Rick Leach / (United States) Jim Pugh (quarterfinals)

== Draw ==
Key

- Q = Qualifier
- WC = Wild card
- LL = Lucky loser
- Alt = Alternate
- ITF = ITF entry
- PR = Protected ranking
- SR = Special ranking
- SE = Special exempt
- JE = Junior exempt
- JR = Junior Accelerator Programme entrant
- CO = College Accelerator Programme entrant
- NG = Next Gen Accelerator Program entrant
- w/o = Walkover
- r = Retired
- d = Defaulted

=== Finals ===
Semifinals
(United States) Ken Flach (United States) Robert Seguso	3
Q	(Australia) Neil Borwick (Australia) Simon Youl	2^{r}
3	(Canada) Grant Connell (Canada) Glenn Michibata	6	7
2	(United States) Scott Davis (United States) David Pate	3	5

Final
(United States) Ken Flach (United States) Robert Seguso	6^{3}	6	7
3	(Canada) Grant Connell (Canada) Glenn Michibata	7^{7}	4	5

=== Top half ===
First round
(United Kingdom) N Broad (South Africa) S Kruger	3	7^{7}	6^{3}
(Australia) W Masur (Australia) J Stoltenberg	6	6^{3}	7^{7}
(United States) Brian Garrow (United States) Kent Kinnear	6	5	6
(Spain) E Sánchez (Serbia) S Živojinović	4	7	4
(United States) K Flach (United States) R Seguso	6	7^{7}
7	(France) G Forget (Switzerland) J Hlasek	4	6^{4}
(United States) S DeVries (Australia) D Macpherson	6	6
(United States) S Cannon (The Bahamas) R Smith	3	2
Q	(Australia) N Borwick (Australia) S Youl	6	7^{7}
(Czechoslovakia) P Korda (United States) I Lendl	3	6^{5}
(United States) J Grabb (Australia) M Kratzmann	7	6
5	(Australia) M Woodforde (Australia) T Woodbridge	5	2

Second round
1	(Australia) J Fitzgerald (Sweden) A Järryd	2	6	7^{7}
(Australia) W Masur (Australia) J Stoltenberg	6	4	6^{2}
(United States) Brian Garrow (United States) Kent Kinnear	6	3	6^{4}
(United States) K Flach (United States) R Seguso	3	6	7^{7}
4	(United States) P Galbraith (United States) T Witsken	6^{5}	7	4
(United States) S DeVries (Australia) D Macpherson	7^{7}	5	6
Q	(Australia) N Borwick (Australia) S Youl	4	7	7^{7}
(United States) J Grabb (Australia) M Kratzmann	6	5	6^{2}

Quarterfinals
1	(Australia) J Fitzgerald (Sweden) A Jarryd	0	1
(United States) K Flach (United States) R Seguso	6	6
(United States) S DeVries (Australia) D Macpherson	4	4
Q	(Australia) N Borwick (Australia) S Youl	6	6

Semifinals
(United States) K Flach (United States) R Seguso	3
Q	(Australia) N Borwick (Australia) S Youl	2^{r}

=== Bottom half ===
First round
6	(South Africa) G Muller (South Africa) D Visser	7	6
(Sweden) P Lundgren (Sweden) T Svantesson	5	3
(United States) L Jensen (Australia) L Warder	6^{5}	5
(South Africa) W Ferreira (South Africa) P Norval	7^{7}	7
(United States) P Annacone (United States) S Melville	4	6	0
(Argentina) J Frana (United States) B Pearce	6	3	6
8	(United States) R Leach (United States) J Pugh	6	7
WC	(Germany) B Becker (Czechoslovakia) T Šmid	3	5
(United States) J Brown (United States) S Salumaa	6^{8}	4
Q	(Czechoslovakia) M Ondruska (Czechoslovakia) G Stafford	7^{10}	6
(Israel) G Bloom (United States) K Curren	3	4
(United States) P McEnroe (United States) D Wheaton	6	6

Second round
6	(South Africa) G Muller (South Africa) D Visser	4	4
(South Africa) W Ferreira (South Africa) P Norval	6	6
(Argentina) J Frana (United States) B Pearce	7^{7}	4	6^{4}
3	(Canada) G Connell (Canada) G Michibata	6^{4}	6	7^{7}
8	(United States) R Leach (United States) J Pugh	6^{2}	7	7
Q	(Czechoslovakia) M Ondruska (Czechoslovakia) G Stafford	7^{7}	5	5
(United States) P McEnroe (United States) D Wheaton	4	6^{4}
2	(United States) S Davis (United States) D Pate	6	7^{7}

Quarterfinals
(South Africa) W Ferreira (South Africa) P Norval	3	4
3	(Canada) G Connell (Canada) G Michibata	6	6
8	(United States) R Leach (United States) J Pugh	7	6^{4}	6^{2}
2	(United States) S Davis (United States) D Pate	5	7^{7}	7^{7}

Semifinals
3	(Canada) G Connell (Canada) G Michibata	6	7
2	(United States) S Davis (United States) D Pate	3	5
