= Márcio Carlsson =

Brazilian tennis player

- Country (sports): Brazil
- Residence: São Paulo
- Born: 24 January 1975 (age 50); Florianópolis, Brazil
- Height: 5 ft 9 in (175 cm)
- Turned pro: 1994
- Retired: 2007
- Plays: Right-handed (1-handed backhand)
- Prize money: $205,297

Singles
- Career record: 5–9
- Career titles: 0
- Highest ranking: No. 119 (9 November 1998)

Grand Slam singles results
- Australian Open: 1R (1999)

Doubles
- Career record: 2–4
- Career titles: 0
- Highest ranking: No. 166 (7 June 1999)

Márcio Carlsson (born 24 January 1975) is a former professional tennis player from Brazil.

== Career ==
Carlsson was a member of the Brazilian team which won the Sunshine Cup in 1993, which was their first title since 1958. He and Gustavo Kuerten won the deciding doubles rubber over the Chilean pairing of Marcelo Ríos and Robinson Gamonal. Earlier in the year, Carlsson had partnered Rios in the French Open boys' doubles event and the pair made the semi-finals. This helped Carlsson finish the season ranked sixth in the world junior doubles rankings. His usual junior doubles teammate however was Kuerten and the pair would also partner each other at Challenger tournaments in 1994 and 1995.

The Brazilian had his best year on tour in 1998. He defeated seventh-seed Grant Stafford at the U.S. Men's Clay Court Championships, before exiting at the quarter-finals, then upset the man who had won that tournament, Jim Courier, in Atlanta. In the lead-up to his meeting with Courier, Carlsson had to play in six qualifying matches. Courier was up a break in the third set, but Carlsson came back to defeat the world number 39. He also beat two top-100 players, Ramón Delgado and Lucas Arnold Ker, at a Challenger tournament that year, which was held in the city of his birth, Florianópolis. On the doubles circuit that season, he had his best result at the Croatia Open, where he and Cristian Brandi made the semi-finals.

In 1999, Carlsson made his only Davis Cup appearance for Brazil. With his team having already secured their World Group tie against Spain, Carlsson played a dead rubber match against Àlex Corretja, which he lost. He also took part in the 1999 Australian Open and was beaten in the opening round by Mariano Puerta, in four sets.

== Challenger titles ==
=== Doubles: (2) ===
No.	Year	Tournament	Surface	Partner	Opponents in the final	Score in the final
1.	1998	Ulm, Germany	Clay	(Brazil) Jaime Oncins	(Germany) Dirk Dier (Germany) Michael Kohlmann	6–4, 6–7, 6–3
2.	2007	Florianópolis, Brazil	Clay	(Brazil) Lucas Engel	(Argentina) Brian Dabul (Argentina) Máximo González	6–4, 2–6, [14–12]
