= 1999 U.S. Men's Clay Court Championships – Doubles =

Doubles
- 1999 U.S. Men's Clay Court Championships

Final
- Champions: (United States) Jim Courier; (Australia) Todd Woodbridge
- Runners-up: (United States) Bob Bryan; (United States) Mike Bryan
- Score: 7–6^{(7–4)}, 6–4

Details
- Draw: 16
- Seeds: 4

Events
Singles	Doubles
- U.S. Men's Clay Court Championships

Grant Stafford and Kevin Ullyett were the defending champions, but Ullyett did not participate this year. Stafford partnered Lan Bale, losing in the quarterfinals.

Jim Courier and Todd Woodbridge won the title, defeating Bob Bryan and Mike Bryan 7–6^{(7–4)}, 6–4 in the final.

== Seeds ==
1. (United States) Justin Gimelstob / (United States) Justin Gimelstob (first round)
2. (Sweden) Nicklas Kulti / (Sweden) Mikael Tillström (first round)
3. (South Africa) Lan Bale / (South Africa) Grant Stafford (quarterfinals)
4. (United States) Jim Grabb / (Serbia and Montenegro) Nenad Zimonjić (quarterfinals)

== Draw ==
Key

- Q = Qualifier
- WC = Wild card
- LL = Lucky loser
- Alt = Alternate
- ITF = ITF entry
- PR = Protected ranking
- SR = Special ranking
- SE = Special exempt
- JE = Junior exempt
- JR = Junior Accelerator Programme entrant
- CO = College Accelerator Programme entrant
- NG = Next Gen Accelerator Program entrant
- w/o = Walkover
- r = Retired
- d = Defaulted

=== Finals ===
First round

Quarterfinals

Semifinals

Final

1
- (United States) P Galbraith
- (United States) J Gimelstob
5
3

Q
- (Germany) K Braasch
- (Germany) D Dier
7
6

Q
- (Germany) K Braasch
- (Germany) D Dier
4
3

WC
- (United States) J Courier
- (Australia) T Woodbridge
6
6

WC
- (United States) J Courier
- (Australia) T Woodbridge
6
6

- (Argentina) D del Río
- (Argentina) M Rodríguez
4
3

WC
- (United States) J Courier
- (Australia) T Woodbridge
7
6

4
- (United States) J Grabb
- (Serbia and Montenegro) N Zimonjić
6
5
6

- (Argentina) L Arnold
- (Argentina) M Hood
6
4

WC
- (United States) J-M Gambill
- (United States) A O'Brien
3
7
4

4
- (United States) J Grabb
- (Serbia and Montenegro) N Zimonjić
4
5

- (New Zealand) J Greenhalgh
- (Australia) G Silcock
6
6
0

- (Argentina) L Arnold
- (Argentina) M Hood
6
7

- (Argentina) L Arnold
- (Argentina) M Hood
3
7
6

WC
- (United States) J Courier
- (Australia) T Woodbridge
7^{7}
6

- (United States) B Bryan
- (United States) M Bryan
6
6

- (United States) B Bryan
- (United States) M Bryan
6^{4}
4

- (South Africa) B Talbot
- (United States) J Waite
3
3

- (United States) B Bryan
- (United States) M Bryan
7
6

- (Hungary) G Köves
- (Brazil) J Oncins
6
2

3
- (South Africa) L Bale
- (South Africa) G Stafford
6
2

3
- (South Africa) L Bale
- (South Africa) G Stafford
7
6

- (United States) B Bryan
- (United States) M Bryan
6
6

- (Mexico) D Roditi
- (South Africa) P Rosner
7
6

- (United States) B Coupe
- (The Bahamas) M Merklein
4
3

WC
- (Australia) L Hewitt
- (United States) C Woodruff
5
4

- (Mexico) D Roditi
- (South Africa) P Rosner
4
6

- (United States) B Coupe
- (The Bahamas) M Merklein
7
7

- (United States) B Coupe
- (The Bahamas) M Merklein
6
7

2
- (Sweden) N Kulti
- (Sweden) M Tillström
6
6
