= 2022 Tel Aviv Open – Doubles =

Doubles
- 2022 Tel Aviv Open

Final
- Champions: (India) Rohan Bopanna (Netherlands) Matwé Middelkoop
- Runners-up: (Mexico) Santiago González (Argentina) Andrés Molteni
- Score: 6–2, 6–4

Details
- Draw: 16
- Seeds: 4

Events
Singles	Doubles
← 1996 ·	Tel Aviv Open

Rohan Bopanna and Matwé Middelkoop defeated Santiago González and Andrés Molteni in the final, 6–2, 6–4 to win the doubles tennis title at the 2022 Tel Aviv Open.

This was the first edition of an ATP Tour event in Tel Aviv since 1996.

== Seeds ==
1. (India) Rohan Bopanna / (Netherlands) Matwé Middelkoop (champions)
2. (Germany) Kevin Krawietz / (Germany) Andreas Mies (semifinals)
3. (Mexico) Santiago González / (Argentina) Andrés Molteni (final)
4. (Uruguay) Ariel Behar / (Argentina) Máximo González (first round)

== Draw ==
=== Key ===
- Q = Qualifier
- WC = Wild card
- LL = Lucky loser
- Alt = Alternate
- SE = Special exempt
- PR = Protected ranking
- ITF = ITF entry
- JE = Junior exempt
- w/o = Walkover
- r = Retired
- d = Defaulted
- SR = Special ranking

=== Draw ===
First round
1	(India) R Bopanna (Netherlands) M Middelkoop	4	7^{7}	[10]
WC	(Serbia) H Međedović (Israel) Y Oliel	6	6^{4}	[6]
Alt	(Italy) M Bortolotti (Spain) S Martos Gornés	5	6	[4]
PR	(Ukraine) D Molchanov (Croatia) F Škugor	7	3	[10]
4	(Uruguay) A Behar (Argentina) M González	3	7	[5]
(France) S Doumbia (France) F Reboul	6	5	[10]
(Monaco) R Arneodo (Austria) S Weissborn	3	6	[2]
(Austria) A Erler (Austria) L Miedler	6	1	[10]
(Serbia) N Djokovic (Israel) J Erlich
PR	(Netherlands) S Arends (Netherlands) B Stevens	w/o
(Netherlands) D Pel (Netherlands) B van de Zandschulp	3	6	[7]
3	(Mexico) S González (Argentina) A Molteni	6	1	[10]
(France) C Lestienne (France) A Olivetti	2	6	[11]
WC	(Israel) D Cukierman (Israel) E Leshem	6	4	[9]
(Finland) E Ruusuvuori (Portugal) J Sousa	6	4	[13]
2	(Germany) K Krawietz (Germany) A Mies	3	6	[15]

Quarterfinals
1	(India) R Bopanna (Netherlands) M Middelkoop	4	7^{7}	[10]
PR	(Ukraine) D Molchanov (Croatia) F Škugor	6	6^{5}	[5]
(France) S Doumbia (France) F Reboul	7^{7}	6
(Austria) A Erler (Austria) L Miedler	6^{5}	2
PR	(Netherlands) S Arends (Netherlands) B Stevens	6^{7}	7^{8}	[4]
3	(Mexico) S González (Argentina) A Molteni	7^{9}	6^{6}	[10]
(France) C Lestienne (France) A Olivetti	4	4
2	(Germany) K Krawietz (Germany) A Mies	6	6

Semifinals
1	(India) R Bopanna (Netherlands) M Middelkoop	4	7^{7}	[10]
(France) S Doumbia (France) F Reboul	6	6^{3}	[8]
3	(Mexico) S González (Argentina) A Molteni	6	6
2	(Germany) K Krawietz (Germany) A Mies	3	2

Final
1	(India) R Bopanna (Netherlands) M Middelkoop	6	6
3	(Mexico) S González (Argentina) A Molteni	2	4
