= 1994 South African Open (tennis) =

- Date: 28 March – 3 April
- Edition: 89th
- Category: ATP World Series
- Draw: 32S / 16D
- Prize money: $288,750
- Surface: Hard / outdoor
- Location: Sun City, South Africa

Champions

Singles
- (West Germany) Markus Zoecke

Doubles
- (South Africa) Marius Barnard / (South Africa) Brent Haygarth
← 1993 ·	South African Open	· 1995 →

The 1994 South African Open, also known as the Sun City Open, was a men's tennis tournament played on outdoor hard courts. It was the 89th edition of the South African Open and was part of the ATP World Series of the 1994 ATP Tour. It took place in Sun City, South Africa from 28 March through 3 April 1994. German Markus Zoecke won the singles final against compatriot Hendrik Dreekmann.

== Finals ==
=== Singles ===
(West Germany) Markus Zoecke defeated (Germany) Hendrik Dreekmann, 6–1, 6–4

- It was Zoecke's first and only singles ATP career title.

=== Doubles ===
(South Africa) Marius Barnard / (South Africa) Brent Haygarth defeated (South Africa) Ellis Ferreira / (South Africa) Grant Stafford, 6–3, 7–5
