= 2022 Tel Aviv Open – Singles =

Singles
- 2022 Tel Aviv Open

Final
- Champion: (Serbia) Novak Djokovic
- Runner-up: (Croatia) Marin Čilić
- Score: 6–3, 6–4

Details
- Draw: 28 (3 WC, 4Q)
- Seeds: 8

Events
Singles	Doubles
← 1996 ·	Tel Aviv Open

Novak Djokovic defeated Marin Čilić in the final, 6–3, 6–4 to win the singles tennis title at the 2022 Tel Aviv Open. Djokovic did not drop a set en route to his 89th ATP Tour-level singles title.

This was the first edition of an ATP Tour event in Tel Aviv since 1996.

== Seeds ==
The top four seeds received a bye into the second round.

1. (Serbia) Novak Djokovic (champion)
2. (Croatia) Marin Čilić (final)
3. (Argentina) Diego Schwartzman (second round)
4. (United States) Maxime Cressy (quarterfinals)
5. (Netherlands) Botic van de Zandschulp (second round)
6. Aslan Karatsev (first round)
7. (France) Adrian Mannarino (first round)
8. (Netherlands) Tallon Griekspoor (first round)

== Draw ==
=== Key ===
- Q = Qualifier
- WC = Wild card
- LL = Lucky loser
- Alt = Alternate
- SE = Special exempt
- PR = Protected ranking
- ITF = ITF entry
- JE = Junior exempt
- w/o = Walkover
- r = Retired
- d = Defaulted
- SR = Special ranking

=== Finals ===
Semifinals
1	(Serbia) Novak Djokovic	6	7^{7}
Roman Safiullin	1	6^{3}
(France) Constant Lestienne	5	3
2	(Croatia) Marin Čilić	7	6

Final
1	(Serbia) Novak Djokovic	6	6
2	(Croatia) Marin Čilić	3	4

=== Top half ===
First round
(Brazil) T Monteiro	6^{3}	1
(Spain) P Andújar	7^{7}	6
Q	(Israel) E Leshem	6	6
WC	(Israel) Y Oliel	3	2
LL	(Canada) V Pospisil	4	7^{7}	7
8	(Netherlands) T Griekspoor	6	6^{3}	5
(France) A Rinderknech	6^{5}	6	6
Q	(Romania) M Copil	7^{7}	4	3
(France) H Grenier	6	4	2
R Safiullin	3	6	6
(Argentina) TM Etcheverry	6	6^{0}	6
6	A Karatsev	2	7^{7}	4

Second round
1	(Serbia) N Djokovic	6	6
(Spain) P Andújar	0	3
Q	(Israel) E Leshem	3	2
LL	(Canada) V Pospisil	6	6
3	(Argentina) D Schwartzman	3	6	6^{7}
(France) A Rinderknech	6	2	7^{9}
R Safiullin	6	6
(Argentina) TM Etcheverry	1	4

Quarterfinals
1	(Serbia) N Djokovic	7^{7}	6
LL	(Canada) V Pospisil	6^{5}	3
(France) A Rinderknech	4	1
R Safiullin	6	6

Semifinals
1	(Serbia) N Djokovic	6	7^{7}
R Safiullin	1	6^{3}

=== Bottom half ===
First round
7	(France) A Mannarino	6^{2}	4
(France) C Lestienne	7^{7}	6
(United States) JJ Wolf	3	2
(Finland) E Ruusuvuori	6	6
Q	(Turkey) C İlkel	4	4
(United States) S Korda	6	6
5	(Netherlands) B van de Zandschulp	6	6
(Portugal) J Sousa	2	3
Q	(United Kingdom) L Broady	7	6
WC	(Serbia) H Međedović	5	3
WC	(Austria) D Thiem	5	7^{7}	6
(Serbia) L Đere	7	6^{3}	4

Second round
(France) C Lestienne	6	6
(Finland) E Ruusuvuori	4	2
(United States) S Korda	4	4
4	(United States) M Cressy	6	6
5	(Netherlands) B van de Zandschulp	4	6	3
Q	(United Kingdom) L Broady	6	4	6
WC	(Austria) D Thiem	7^{8}	2	4
2	(Croatia) M Čilić	6^{6}	6	6

Quarterfinals
(France) C Lestienne	6^{4}	6	7^{7}
4	(United States) M Cressy	7^{7}	3	6^{3}
Q	(United Kingdom) L Broady
2	(Croatia) M Čilić	w/o

Semifinals
(France) C Lestienne	5	3
2	(Croatia) M Čilić	7	6

== Qualifying ==
=== Seeds ===
1. (United Kingdom) Liam Broady (qualified)
2. (Canada) Vasek Pospisil (qualifying competition, lucky loser)
3. (Italy) Luca Nardi (qualifying competition)
4. Alexander Shevchenko (qualifying competition)
5. (Hungary) Zsombor Piros (first round)
6. (Spain) Nicolás Álvarez Varona (qualifying competition)
7. (Italy) Lorenzo Giustino (first round)
8. (Romania) Nicholas David Ionel (first round)

=== Qualifiers ===
1. (United Kingdom) Liam Broady
2. (Romania) Marius Copil
3. (Israel) Edan Leshem
4. (Turkey) Cem İlkel

=== Lucky loser ===
1. (Canada) Vasek Pospisil

=== Qualifying draw ===
==== First qualifier ====
First round
1	(United Kingdom) Liam Broady	6	6
PR	(Italy) Roberto Marcora	3	2
WC	(Israel) Daniel Cukierman	2	6	3
6	(Spain) Nicolás Álvarez Varona	6	2	6

Qualifying competition
1	(United Kingdom) Liam Broady	7^{7}	6
6	(Spain) Nicolás Álvarez Varona	6^{1}	1

==== Second qualifier ====
First round
2	(Canada) Vasek Pospisil	7^{7}	6
(Ukraine) Illya Marchenko	6^{5}	2
Alt	(Romania) Marius Copil	3	6	6
8	(Romania) Nicholas David Ionel	6	1	4

Qualifying competition
2	(Canada) Vasek Pospisil	5	4
Alt	(Romania) Marius Copil	7	6

==== Third qualifier ====
First round
3	(Italy) Luca Nardi	6	6
Andrey Chepelev	3	1
WC	(Israel) Edan Leshem	6	6
7	(Italy) Lorenzo Giustino	3	1

Qualifying competition
3	(Italy) Luca Nardi	4	6^{4}
WC	(Israel) Edan Leshem	6	7^{7}

==== Fourth qualifier ====
First round
4	Alexander Shevchenko	6	6
Alt	(Czech Republic) Marek Gengel	4	4
(Turkey) Cem İlkel	4	7^{7}	7^{7}
5	(Hungary) Zsombor Piros	6	6^{4}	6^{5}

Qualifying competition
4	Alexander Shevchenko	6	4	1
(Turkey) Cem İlkel	2	6	6
