= 1991 Thriftway ATP Championships – Singles =

Singles
- 1991 Thriftway ATP Championships

Final
- Champion: (France) Guy Forget
- Runner-up: (United States) Pete Sampras
- Score: 2–6, 7–6^{(7–4)}, 6–4

Details
- Draw: 56
- Seeds: 16

Events
Singles	Doubles
← 1990 ·	Thriftway ATP Championships	· 1992 →

Guy Forget defeated Pete Sampras in the final, 2–6, 7–6^{(7–4)}, 6–4 to win the singles tennis title at the 1991 Cincinnati Masters.

Stefan Edberg was the defending champion, but lost to Sampras in the quarterfinals.

== Seeds ==
The top eight seeds received a bye to the second round.

1. (Germany) Boris Becker (semifinals)
2. (Sweden) Stefan Edberg (quarterfinals)
3. (Czechoslovakia) Ivan Lendl (third round)
4. (United States) Jim Courier (semifinals)
5. (United States) Andre Agassi (third round)
6. (France) Guy Forget (champion)
7. (United States) Pete Sampras (final)
8. (United States) David Wheaton (third round)
9. (Spain) Emilio Sánchez (first round)
10. (Soviet Union) Andrei Cherkasov (quarterfinals)
11. (Switzerland) Jakob Hlasek (second round)
12. (United States) Brad Gilbert (quarterfinals)
13. (United States) Michael Chang (third round)
14. (United States) Derrick Rostagno (quarterfinals)
15. (United States) Richey Reneberg (first round)
16. (Sweden) Jonas Svensson (first round)

== Draw ==
=== Key ===
- Q = Qualifier
- WC = Wild card
- LL = Lucky loser
- Alt = Alternate
- SE = Special exempt
- PR = Protected ranking
- ITF = ITF entry
- JE = Junior exempt
- w/o = Walkover
- r = Retired
- d = Defaulted
- SR = Special ranking

=== Finals ===
Quarterfinals
1/WC	(Germany) Boris Becker	7^{9}	6
10	(Soviet Union) Andrei Cherkasov	6^{7}	3
14	(United States) Derrick Rostagno	6^{6}	4
6	(France) Guy Forget	7^{8}	6
12	(United States) Brad Gilbert	3	3
4	(United States) Jim Courier	6	6
7	(United States) Pete Sampras	6	6
2	(Sweden) Stefan Edberg	3	3

Semifinals
1/WC	(Germany) Boris Becker	6^{1}	6	3
6	(France) Guy Forget	7^{7}	4	6
4	(United States) Jim Courier	2	5
7	(United States) Pete Sampras	6	7

Final
6	(France) Guy Forget	2	7^{7}	6
7	(United States) Pete Sampras	6	6^{4}	4

=== Top half ===
==== Section 1 ====
First round
(France) J-P Fleurian	7	4	6
(United States) J Grabb	5	6	3
(Australia) R Fromberg	3	4
(United States) M Washington	6	6
(United States) A Krickstein	7^{7}	3	7^{7}
15	(United States) R Reneberg	6^{5}	6	6^{4}
10	(Soviet Union) A Cherkasov	7^{7}	6
(Australia) T Woodbridge	6^{4}	1
(Sweden) P Lundgren	7^{8}	4	6
(Soviet Union) A Chesnokov	6^{6}	6	3
WC	(Ecuador) A Gómez	5	6	7^{7}
(Italy) S Pescosolido	7	4	6^{0}

Second round
1/WC	(Germany) B Becker	6	6
(France) J-P Fleurian	3	3
(United States) M Washington	6	6
(United States) A Krickstein	1	4
10	(Soviet Union) A Cherkasov	6	6
(Sweden) P Lundgren	4	2
WC	(Ecuador) A Gómez	5	2
8	(United States) D Wheaton	7	6

Third round
1/WC	(Germany) B Becker	6	6
(United States) M Washington	4	4
10	(Soviet Union) A Cherkasov	6	6
8	(United States) D Wheaton	3	2

Quarterfinals
1/WC	(Germany) B Becker	7^{9}	6
10	(Soviet Union) A Cherkasov	6^{7}	3

==== Section 2 ====
First round
(United States) P McEnroe	6	7
(United States) K Curren	3	5
(Italy) C Caratti	2	6^{2}
Q	(United States) C Garner	6	7^{7}
(Israel) G Bloom	2	3
14	(United States) D Rostagno	6	6
11	(Switzerland) J Hlasek	6	6
(United States) J Arias	1	1
Q	(Italy) G Pozzi	6	6
(United States) T Witsken	4	2
Q	(South Africa) M Ondruska	6	6
(Australia) M Woodforde	3	3

Second round
3/WC	(Czechoslovakia) I Lendl	6	6
(United States) P McEnroe	1	3
Q	(United States) C Garner	6	3	4
14	(United States) D Rostagno	4	6	6
11	(Switzerland) J Hlasek	4	5
Q	(Italy) G Pozzi	6	7
Q	(South Africa) M Ondruska	2	2
6	(France) G Forget	6	6

Third round
3/WC	(Czechoslovakia) I Lendl	6^{5}	6	3
14	(United States) D Rostagno	7^{7}	3	6
Q	(Italy) G Pozzi	4	4
6	(France) G Forget	6	6

Quarterfinals
14	(United States) D Rostagno	6^{6}	4
6	(France) G Forget	7^{8}	6

=== Bottom half ===
==== Section 3 ====
First round
(Czechoslovakia) P Korda	6	6
(Canada) G Connell	3	1
Q	(Brazil) F Roese	3	1
(Peru) J Yzaga	6	6
(United States) B Pearce	5	3
12	(United States) B Gilbert	7	6
13	(United States) M Chang	4	6	6
(France) R Gilbert	6	2	1
Q	(South Africa) D Visser	6	3	7^{7}
(Haiti) R Agénor	4	6	6^{2}
(United States) D Pate	3	5
(Sweden) M Pernfors	6	7

Second round
5	(United States) A Agassi	7	2	6
(Czechoslovakia) P Korda	5	6	2
(Peru) J Yzaga	2	5
12	(United States) B Gilbert	6	7
13	(United States) M Chang	6	6
Q	(South Africa) D Visser	1	3
(Sweden) M Pernfors	3	1
4	(United States) J Courier	6	6

Third round
5	(United States) A Agassi	6^{7}	7^{8}	4
12	(United States) B Gilbert	7^{9}	6^{6}	6
13	(United States) M Chang	5	2
4	(United States) J Courier	7	6

Quarterfinals
12	(United States) B Gilbert	3	3
4	(United States) J Courier	6	6

==== Section 4 ====
First round
(South Africa) G Muller	7^{7}	4	6^{4}
(Australia) W Masur	6^{3}	6	7^{7}
(South Africa) W Ferreira	6	6
(India) R Krishnan	1	3
(Australia) J Stoltenberg	6	6
9	(Spain) E Sánchez	3	4
16	(Sweden) J Svensson	7^{7}	5	4
(Sweden) A Järryd	6^{2}	7	6
(Israel) A Mansdorf	6	6
(United States) S Davis	4	4
Q	(South Africa) G Stafford	6	6
Q	(United States) S DeVries	4	3

Second round
7	(United States) P Sampras	7^{7}	6
(Australia) W Masur	6^{3}	4
(South Africa) W Ferreira	6	3	6
(Australia) J Stoltenberg	2	6	3
(Sweden) A Järryd	4	1
(Israel) A Mansdorf	6	6
Q	(South Africa) G Stafford	2	0
2	(Sweden) S Edberg	6	6

Third round
7	(United States) P Sampras	6	6
(South Africa) W Ferreira	1	4
(Israel) A Mansdorf	1	2
2	(Sweden) S Edberg	6	6

Quarterfinals
7	(United States) P Sampras	6	6
2	(Sweden) S Edberg	3	3
