= 1998 U.S. Men's Clay Court Championships =

- Date: April 20–27
- Edition: 30th
- Category: World Series
- Draw: 32S / 16D
- Prize money: $264,250
- Surface: Clay / outdoor
- Location: Orlando, Florida, U.S.

Champions

Singles
- (United States) Jim Courier

Doubles
- (South Africa) Grant Stafford / (Zimbabwe) Kevin Ullyett
← 1997 ·	U.S. Men's Clay Court Championships	· 1999 →

The 1998 U.S. Men's Clay Court Championships was an Association of Tennis Professionals men's tennis tournament held in Orlando, Florida in the United States and played on outdoor clay courts that was part of the World Series of the 1998 ATP Tour. It was the 30th edition of the tournament and was held from April 20 to April 27, 1998. Third-seeded Jim Courier won the singles title.

== Finals ==
=== Singles ===
(United States) Jim Courier defeated (United States) Michael Chang 7–5, 3–6, 7–5

- It was Courier's only title of the year and the 28th of his career.

=== Doubles ===
(South Africa) Grant Stafford / (Zimbabwe) Kevin Ullyett defeated (Australia) Michael Tebbutt / (Sweden) Mikael Tillström 4–6, 6–4, 7–5

- It was Stafford's 1st title of the year and the 2nd of his career. It was Ullyett's 2nd title of the year and the 3rd of his career.
