= 1999 U.S. Men's Clay Court Championships =

- Date: April 19–26
- Edition: 31st
- Draw: 32S / 16D
- Prize money: $264,250
- Surface: Clay / outdoor
- Location: Orlando, United States

Champions

Singles
- (Sweden) Magnus Norman

Doubles
- (United States) Jim Courier / (Australia) Todd Woodbridge
← 1998 ·	U.S. Men's Clay Court Championships	· 2000 →

The 1999 U.S. Men's Clay Court Championships was an Association of Tennis Professionals tennis tournament held in Orlando, United States. It was the 31st edition of the tournament and was held from April 19 to April 26. Magnus Norman won the singles title. Eighth-seeded Magnus Norman won the singles title.

== Finals ==
=== Singles ===
(Sweden) Magnus Norman defeated (Argentina) Guillermo Cañas, 6–0, 6–3.

- It was Norman's 1st title of the year and the 3rd of his career.

=== Doubles ===
(United States) Jim Courier / (Australia) Todd Woodbridge defeated (United States) Bob Bryan / (United States) Mike Bryan, 7–6^{(7–4)}, 6–4.

- It was Courier's only title of the year and the 29th of his career. It was Woodbridge's 1st title of the year and the 59th of his career.
