= 1999 U.S. Men's Clay Court Championships – Singles =

Singles
- 1999 U.S. Men's Clay Court Championships

Final
- Champion: (Sweden) Magnus Norman
- Runner-up: (Argentina) Guillermo Cañas
- Score: 6–0, 6–3

Details
- Draw: 32
- Seeds: 8

Events
| Singles | Doubles |
- U.S. Men's Clay Court Championships

The 1999 U.S. Men's Clay Court Championships was an Association of Tennis Professionals tennis tournament held in Orlando, Florida in the United States. It was the 31st edition of the tournament and was held from April 19 to April 26. Magnus Norman won the singles title.

== Seeds ==
A champion seed is indicated in bold text while text in italics indicates the round in which that seed was eliminated.

1. (Australia) Jason Stoltenberg (second round)
2. (United States) Jan-Michael Gambill (first round)
3. (Australia) Scott Draper (first round)
4. (Sweden) Magnus Larsson (first round)
5. (United States) Jim Courier (quarterfinals)
6. (Australia) Lleyton Hewitt (second round)
7. (Norway) Christian Ruud (semifinals, retired)
8. (Sweden) **Magnus Norman (champion)**

== Draw ==
Key

- Q = Qualifier
- WC = Wild card
- LL = Lucky loser
- Alt = Alternate
- ITF = ITF entry
- PR = Protected ranking
- SR = Special ranking
- SE = Special exempt
- JE = Junior exempt
- JR = Junior Accelerator Programme entrant
- CO = College Accelerator Programme entrant
- NG = Next Gen Accelerator Program entrant
- w/o = Walkover
- r = Retired
- d = Defaulted

First round
1 | (Australia) **J Stoltenberg** | **6** | 6^{5} | **6**
(United States) J Gimelstob | 0 | **7^{7}** | 4
(Argentina) **H Gumy** | **6** | 6^{2} | **6**
(Australia) T Woodbridge | 3 | **7^{7}** | 4
(Bulgaria) O Stanoytchev | **7** | 0 | 4
(Argentina) **L Arnold Ker** | 5 | **6** | **6**
(Spain) Á Calatrava | 4 | 2
7 | (Norway) **C Ruud** | **6** | **6**
4 | (Sweden) M Larsson | **6** | 3 | 4
(Italy) **G Pozzi** | 3 | **6** | **6**
(Spain) **A Martín** | **6** | 3 | **7**
(Belgium) J Van Herck | 3 | **6** | 5
(Argentina) **G Cañas** | **6** | **7^{7}**
(Austria) S Koubek | 4 | 6^{3}
(Argentina) M Rodríguez | 3 | 4
6 | (Australia) **L Hewitt** | **6** | **6**
WC/5 | (United States) **J Courier** | **6** | **7**
(Sweden) M Tillström | 4 | 5
WC | (United States) A O'Brien | 5 | 3
(Spain) **G Blanco** | **7** | **6**
Q | (France) **R Cadart** | 4 | **7^{7}** | **6**
(Czech Republic) P Korda | **6** | 6^{4} | 1
Q | (Belarus) **M Mirnyi** | **6** | 3 | **6**
3 | (Australia) S Draper | 4 | **6** | 3
8 | (Sweden) **M Norman** | **6** | **6**
Q | (France) O Malcor | 3 | 0
(Italy) L Tieleman | 3 | 0
(Spain) **C Costa** | **6** | **6**
WC | (United States) C Woodruff | 6^{3} | 0
Q | (Romania) **G Trifu** | **7^{7}** | **6**
(Armenia) **S Sargsian** | 3 | **6** | **7^{7}**
2 | (United States) J-M Gambill | **6** | 3 | 6^{4}

Second round
1 | (Australia) J Stoltenberg | 6^{3} | 6^{4}
(Argentina) **H Gumy** | **7^{7}** | **7^{7}**
(Argentina) L Arnold Ker | **6** | 6^{3} | 2
7 | (Norway) **C Ruud** | 3 | **7^{7}** | **6**
(Italy) G Pozzi | 3 | **6** | 2
(Spain) **A Martín** | **6** | 3 | **6**
(Argentina) **G Cañas** | **6** | **6**
6 | (Australia) L Hewitt | 2 | 2
WC/5 | (United States) **J Courier** | **7** | **6**
(Spain) G Blanco | 5 | 4
Q | (France) R Cadart | 2 | 6^{7}
Q | (Belarus) **M Mirnyi** | **6** | **7^{9}**
8 | (Sweden) **M Norman** | **6** | **6**
(Spain) C Costa | 4 | 4
Q | (Romania) **G Trifu** | **6** | **6**
(Armenia) S Sargsian | 4 | 4

Quarterfinals
(Argentina) H Gumy | 6^{10} | 4
7 | (Norway) **C Ruud** | **7^{12}** | **6**
(Spain) A Martín | 4 | 6^{4}
(Argentina) **G Cañas** | **6** | **7^{7}**
WC/5 | (United States) J Courier | 3 | **7^{7}** | 4
Q | (Belarus) **M Mirnyi** | **6** | 6^{3} | **6**
8 | (Sweden) **M Norman** | **7** | **6**
Q | (Romania) G Trifu | 5 | 2

Semifinals
7 | (Norway) C Ruud | 2^{r}
(Argentina) **G Cañas** | 5
Q | (Belarus) M Mirnyi | 2 | 1
8 | (Sweden) **M Norman** | **6** | **6**

Final
(Argentina) Guillermo Cañas | 0 | 3
8 | (Sweden) **Magnus Norman** | **6** | **6**
