= 1996 Eisenberg Israel Open =

- Date: October 14–20
- Edition: 17th
- Category: World Series
- Draw: 32S / 16D
- Prize money: $303,000
- Surface: Hard / outdoor
- Location: Ramat HaSharon, Tel Aviv District, Israel
- Venue: Israel Tennis Centers

Champions

Singles
- (Spain) Javier Sánchez

Doubles
- (South Africa) Marcos Ondruska / (South Africa) Grant Stafford
← 1995 ·	Tel Aviv Open	· 2022 →

The 1996 Eisenberg Israel Open was a men's tennis tournament played on outdoor hard courts at the Israel Tennis Centers in the Tel Aviv District city of Ramat HaSharon, Israel and was part of the World Series of the 1996 ATP Tour. The tournament ran from October 14 through October 20, 1996. Fourth-seeded Javier Sánchez won the singles title.

== Finals ==
=== Singles ===
(Spain) Javier Sánchez defeated (South Africa) Marcos Ondruska 6–4, 7–5

- It was Sánchez's 2nd title of the year and the 24th of his career.

=== Doubles ===
(South Africa) Marcos Ondruska / (South Africa) Grant Stafford defeated (Israel) Noam Behr / (Israel) Eyal Erlich 6–3, 6–2

- It was Ondruska's 3rd title of the year and the 3rd of his career. It was Stafford's only title of the year and the 1st of his career.
