= 1998 U.S. Men's Clay Court Championships – Doubles =

Doubles
- 1998 U.S. Men's Clay Court Championships

Final
- Champions: (South Africa) Grant Stafford; (Zimbabwe) Kevin Ullyett
- Runners-up: (Australia) Michael Tebbutt; (Sweden) Mikael Tillström
- Score: 4–6, 6–4, 7–5

Details
- Draw: 16
- Seeds: 4

Events
Singles	Doubles
- U.S. Men's Clay Court Championships

Mark Merklein and Vincent Spadea were the defending champions, but lost in the quarterfinals this year.

Grant Stafford and Kevin Ullyett won the title, defeating Michael Tebbutt and Mikael Tillström 4–6, 6–4, 7–5 in the final.

== Seeds ==
1. (United States) Luke Jensen / (United States) Murphy Jensen (quarterfinals)
2. (United States) Dave Randall / (United States) Jack Waite (first round)
3. (Zimbabwe) Wayne Black / (Venezuela) Maurice Ruah (first round)
4. (Australia) Michael Tebbutt / (Sweden) Mikael Tillström (final)

== Draw ==
Key

- Q = Qualifier
- WC = Wild card
- LL = Lucky loser
- Alt = Alternate
- ITF = ITF entry
- PR = Protected ranking
- SR = Special ranking
- SE = Special exempt
- JE = Junior exempt
- JR = Junior Accelerator Programme entrant
- CO = College Accelerator Programme entrant
- NG = Next Gen Accelerator Program entrant
- w/o = Walkover
- r = Retired
- d = Defaulted

=== Draw ===
First round

Quarterfinals

Semifinals

Final

1
- (United States) L Jensen
- (United States) M Jensen
5
6
6

- (United States) B Coupe
- (Belgium) T Vanhoudt
7
0
1

1
- (United States) L Jensen
- (United States) M Jensen
3
1

WC
- (United States) G Grant
- (United States) D Witt
3
4

- (United States) D Flach
- (United States) R Reneberg
6
6

- (United States) D Flach
- (United States) R Reneberg
6
6

- (United States) D Flach
- (United States) R Reneberg
6
2

4
- (Australia) M Tebbutt
- (Sweden) M Tillström
6
6

4
- (Australia) M Tebbutt
- (Sweden) M Tillström
7
6

Q
- (Italy) M Ardinghi
- (Netherlands) S Groen
3
3

4
- (Australia) M Tebbutt
- (Sweden) M Tillström
7
7

WC
- (United States) J Courier
- (The Bahamas) M Knowles
6
3

- (United States) K Kinnear
- (Sweden) P Nyborg
5
6

- (United States) K Kinnear
- (Sweden) P Nyborg
7
6

4
- (Australia) M Tebbutt
- (Sweden) M Tillström
6
4
5

- (Belgium) L Pimek
- (South Africa) B Talbot
0
7
6

- (South Africa) G Stafford
- (Zimbabwe) K Ullyett
4
6
7

- (United States) M Keil
- (United States) G Van Emburgh
6
6
3

- (Belgium) L Pimek
- (South Africa) B Talbot
1
3

- (South Africa) C Haggard
- (South Africa) P Rosner
6
7
7

- (South Africa) C Haggard
- (South Africa) P Rosner
6
6

3
- (Zimbabwe) W Black
- (Venezuela) M Ruah
7
5
5

- (South Africa) C Haggard
- (South Africa) P Rosner
4
6

- (United States) J Gimelstob
- (Armenia) S Sargsian
6
4

- (South Africa) G Stafford
- (Zimbabwe) K Ullyett
6
7

WC
- (The Bahamas) M Merklein
- (United States) V Spadea
7
6

WC
- (The Bahamas) M Merklein
- (United States) V Spadea
7
6
5

- (South Africa) G Stafford
- (Zimbabwe) K Ullyett
6
6

- (South Africa) G Stafford
- (Zimbabwe) K Ullyett
5
7
7

2
- (United States) D Randall
- (United States) J Waite
0
3
