= 1993 South African Open (tennis) =

- Date: 29 March – 5 April
- Edition: 88th
- Category: ATP World Series
- Draw: 32S / 16D
- Prize money: $275,000
- Surface: Hard / outdoor
- Location: Durban, South Africa

Champions

Singles
- (United States) Aaron Krickstein

Doubles
- (South Africa) Lan Bale / (Zimbabwe) Byron Black
- South African Open

The 1993 South African Open was a men's tennis tournament played on outdoor hard courts. It was the 88th edition of the South African Open and was part of the ATP World Series of the 1993 ATP Tour. It took place in Durban, South Africa from 29 March through 5 April 1993.

American Aaron Krickstein, seeded No.5, defended his title that he had won the previous year, beating South African Grant Stafford in the singles final.

== Finals ==
=== Singles ===
(United States) Aaron Krickstein defeated (South Africa) Grant Stafford, 6–3, 7–6^{(9–7)}

- It was Krickstein's only singles title of the year and the 9th and last of his career.

=== Doubles ===
(South Africa) Lan Bale / (Zimbabwe) Byron Black defeated (South Africa) Johan de Beer / (South Africa) Marcos Ondruska, 7–6, 6–2
