= Lior Mor =

Israeli tennis player

- Native name: ליאור מור
- Country (sports): Israel
- Born: 29 February 1976 (age 49); Haifa, Israel
- Prize money: $117,177

Singles
- Career record: 1–3
- Career titles: 0
- Highest ranking: No. 171 (7 June 1999)

Doubles
- Career record: 0–2
- Career titles: 0
- Highest ranking: No. 164 (19 June 2000)

Lior Mor (Hebrew: ליאור מור; born 29 February 1976) is a former professional tennis player from Israel. He was ranked as high as 171 in the world in singles (in 1999), and 164 in the world in doubles (in 2000).

== Biography ==
Mior, an Israeli Jew from Haifa, developed his game at the Tennis Academy in Tel Aviv. He had a win over Gustavo Kuerten in his junior career.

On the professional tour he competed mostly at Challenger level and won a total of five titles, two in singles and three in doubles. His Challenger career also included wins against Nicolás Massú and Radek Štěpánek.

He made occasional appearances in ATP Tour tournaments, the first in 1996 when he played in the doubles draw of the Israel Open in Tel Aviv, with Nir Welgreen. That year he won the Manchester Challenger (G) with M. Mirnyi. In 1998, after getting past Taylor Dent in qualifying, Mor played in the main singles draw in Long Island, where he lost in the first round to world number 28 Francisco Clavet. That year he won a Greece F4 Futures (OC), a Greece F5 Futures (CL), and a Greece F6 Futures (H), and in doubles he won an Israel F2 Futures (H) with Harel Levy, a Greece F5 Futures (CL) - with W. Neefs, and a Greece F7 Futures (CL) with Harel Levy. In 1999 he won a Jerusalem Challenger (H). In 2000 he won a Denver Challenger (H), and in doubles he won an Uzbekistan F1 Futures (H) with Jonathan Erlich, and Uzbekistan F1 Futures (H) with Erlich, a Fergana Challenger (H)with Erlich, and a Denver Challenger (H) with Erlich. He featured in both the singles and doubles at the 2000 RCA Championships in Indianapolis.

Mor represented the Israel Davis Cup team in one tie, against Bulgaria in Sofia in 2000. The tie, which was a Europe/Africa Zone relegation play-off, was won by Israel 3–2. Mor, who lost his first singles match, won the deciding fifth rubber for Israel in straight sets, over Todor Enev.

For many years he was captain and coach of the Israel Fed Cup team. He coached Tzipora Obziler and Shahar Pe'er at the 2008 Summer Olympics in Beijing.

== Challenger titles ==
=== Singles: (2) ===
No.	Year	Tournament	Surface	Opponent	Score
1.	1999	Jerusalem, Israel	Hard	(South Africa) Neville Godwin	7–5, 5–7, 6–2
2.	2000	Denver, U. S.	Hard	(Mexico) Alejandro Hernández	6–3, 6–4

=== Doubles: (3) ===
No.	Year	Tournament	Surface	Partner	Opponents	Score
1.	1996	Manchester, Great Britain	Grass	(Belarus) Max Mirnyi	(Belgium) Dick Norman (Netherlands) Fernon Wibier	7–5, 7–6
2.	2000	Fergana, Uzbekistan	Hard	(Israel) Jonathan Erlich	(Brazil) Daniel Melo (Brazil) Alexandre Simoni	6–4, 6–0
3.	2000	Denver, U. S.	Hard	(Israel) Jonathan Erlich	(Israel) Noam Behr (Israel) Andy Ram	6–4, 5–7, 6–2

== See also ==
- List of Israel Davis Cup team representatives
