= Eyal Erlich =

Israeli tennis player

- Native name: אייל ארליך
- Country (sports): Israel
- Residence: Israel
- Born: 1 January 1977 (age 49) near Tel Aviv
- Height: 1.83 m (6 ft 0 in)
- Turned pro: 1995
- Plays: Right-handed
- Prize money: $172,773

Singles
- Career record: 5–12
- Career titles: 0
- Highest ranking: No. 144 (15 September 1997)

Grand Slam singles results
- Wimbledon: 1R (1995)
- US Open: 1R (1998)

Eyal Erlich (Hebrew: אייל ארליך; born 1 January 1977) is a former professional tennis player from Israel.

== Career ==
Erlich made his Grand Slam debut at the 1995 Wimbledon Championships, entering the main draw as a lucky loser. He was defeated in the first round by German Arne Thoms, in straight sets. Three years later he qualified for his second Grand Slam, the 1998 US Open, but exited again in the opening round, losing to 20th seed Michael Chang.

On the ATP Tour he was more successful as a doubles player and with partner Noam Behr reached the final of the 1996 Eisenberg Israel Open, as wild cards entrants. His highest ever doubles ranking was 160th in the world, which he attained in 1998.

He also represented the Israel Davis Cup team, appearing in a total of 10 ties during his career. Of the 16 rubbers which he played, he won nine, five in singles and four in doubles. In 1996 he won the fifth and decisive rubber against Norway's Helge Koll-Frafjord. His best wins perhaps came in the doubles, with victories over the Àlex Corretja and Emilio Sánchez combination from Spain as well as the Dominik Hrbatý and Karol Kučera pairing from Slovakia.

== ATP career finals ==
=== Doubles: (1 runner-up) ===
Result	No.	Date	Tournament	Surface	Partner	Opponents	Score
Loss	1.	Oct 1996	Tel Aviv, Israel	Hard	(Israel) Noam Behr	(South Africa) Marcos Ondruska (South Africa) Grant Stafford	3–6, 2–6

== Challenger titles ==
=== Doubles: (3) ===
No.	Year	Tournament	Surface	Partner	Opponents	Score
1.	1998	Magdeburg, Germany	Carpet	(Italy) Mosé Navarra	(South Africa) Marcos Ondruska (United Kingdom) Chris Wilkinson	4–6, 6–1, 6–4
2.	1998	Jerusalem, Israel	Hard	(Israel) Noam Behr	(South Africa) Neville Godwin (South Africa) David Nainkin	W/O
3.	2000	Istanbul, Turkey	Hard	(Israel) Noam Behr	(Russia) Vadim Kutsenko (Uzbekistan) Oleg Ogorodov	6–7^{(5–7)}, 6–3, 6–3
