= 1995 Tel Aviv Open =

- Date: October 9–16
- Edition: 16th
- Category: World Series
- Draw: 32S / 16D
- Prize money: $250,000
- Surface: Hard / outdoor
- Location: Ramat HaSharon, Tel Aviv District, Israel
- Venue: Israel Tennis Centers

Champions

Singles
- (Slovakia) Ján Krošlák

Doubles
- (United States) Jim Grabb / (United States) Jared Palmer
| ← 1994 · | Tel Aviv Open | · 1996 → |

The 1995 Tel Aviv Open was a men's tennis tournament played on hard courts that was part of the World Series of the 1995 ATP Tour. It was played at the Israel Tennis Centers in the Tel Aviv District city of Ramat HaSharon, Israel from October 9 through October 16, 1995. Unseeded Ján Krošlák won the singles title.

== Finals ==
=== Singles ===
(Slovakia) Ján Krošlák defeated (Spain) Javier Sánchez 6–3, 6–4

- It was Kroslak's only title of the year and the 1st of his career.

=== Doubles ===
(United States) Jim Grabb / (United States) Jared Palmer defeated (United States) Kent Kinnear / (United States) David Wheaton 6–4, 7–5

- It was Grabb's 3rd title of the year and the 20th of his career. It was Palmer's 3rd title of the year and the 10th of his career.
