= 1991 Thriftway ATP Championships =

- Date: August 5–11
- Edition: 90th
- Draw: 56S / 28D
- Prize money: $1,020,000
- Surface: Hard / outdoor
- Location: Mason, Ohio, U.S.
- Venue: Lindner Family Tennis Center

Champions

Singles
- (France) Guy Forget

Doubles
- (United States) Ken Flach / (United States) Robert Seguso
- Cincinnati Masters

The 1991 Cincinnati Open, known by the corporate title of the Thriftway ATP Championships was a tennis tournament played on outdoor clay courts. It was the 90th edition of the tournament and was part of the ATP Super 9 of the 1991 ATP Tour It took place in Mason, Ohio, United States, from August 5 through August 11, 1991.

The tournament had previously appeared on the Tier III of the WTA Tour but no event was held from 1989 to 2003.

== Champions ==
=== Singles ===
(France) Guy Forget defeated (United States) Pete Sampras, 2–6, 7–6^{(7–4)}, 6–4

- It was Guy Forget's 3rd title of the year and his 6th overall. It was his 1st Masters title.

=== Doubles ===
(United States) Ken Flach / (United States) Robert Seguso defeated (Canada) Grant Connell / (Canada) Glenn Michibata 6–7, 6–4, 7–5
