= 2022 Tel Aviv Open =

- Date: 26 September – 2 October
- Edition: 18th
- Category: ATP Tour 250 series
- Draw: 28S / 16D
- Prize money: $949,475
- Surface: Hard (indoor)
- Location: Tel Aviv, Israel
- Venue: Expo Tel Aviv

Champions

Singles
- (Serbia) Novak Djokovic

Doubles
- (India) Rohan Bopanna / (Netherlands) Matwé Middelkoop
- Tel Aviv Open

The 2022 Tel Aviv Open (also known as the 2022 Tel Aviv Watergen Open for sponsorship purposes) was a tennis tournament played on indoor hard court. It was the first edition of the Tel Aviv Open at the ATP Tour level since 1996 (18th overall), and part of the ATP Tour 250 series of the 2022 ATP Tour. It was played at Expo Tel Aviv in Tel Aviv, Israel, from 26 September to 2 October 2022.

The event was primarily organized due to the cancellation of tournaments in China during the 2022 season because of the ongoing COVID-19 pandemic.

== Champions ==
=== Singles ===
- (Serbia) Novak Djokovic def. (Croatia) Marin Čilić, 6–3, 6–4
- It was Djokovic's 3rd title of the year and the 89th of his career.

=== Doubles ===
- (India) Rohan Bopanna / (Netherlands) Matwé Middelkoop def. (Mexico) Santiago González / (Argentina) Andrés Molteni, 6–2, 6–4

== Singles main-draw entrants ==
=== Seeds ===
Country	Player	Rank^{1}	Seed
SRB	Novak Djokovic	7	1
CRO	Marin Čilić	16	2
ARG	Diego Schwartzman	17	3
USA	Maxime Cressy	34	4
NED	Botic van de Zandschulp	35	5
	Aslan Karatsev	39	6
FRA	Adrian Mannarino	47	7
NED	Tallon Griekspoor	48	8

- ^{1} Rankings are as of 19 September 2022.

=== Other entrants ===
The following players received wildcards into the main draw:

- (Serbia) Hamad Međedović
- (Israel) Yshai Oliel
- (Austria) Dominic Thiem

The following players received entry from the qualifying draw:

- (United Kingdom) Liam Broady
- (Romania) Marius Copil
- (Turkey) Cem İlkel
- (Israel) Edan Leshem

The following player received entry as a lucky loser:

- (Canada) Vasek Pospisil

=== Withdrawals ===
- (France) Benjamin Bonzi → replaced by (France) Hugo Grenier
- Karen Khachanov → replaced by (United States) J. J. Wolf
- (Slovakia) Alex Molčan → replaced by (Argentina) Tomás Martín Etcheverry
- (United States) Tommy Paul → replaced by (France) Constant Lestienne
- (Spain) Albert Ramos Viñolas → replaced by (Canada) Vasek Pospisil

== Doubles main-draw entrants ==
=== Seeds ===
Country	Player	Country	Player	Rank^{1}	Seed
IND	Rohan Bopanna	NED	Matwé Middelkoop	45	1
GER	Kevin Krawietz	GER	Andreas Mies	60	2
MEX	Santiago González	ARG	Andrés Molteni	68	3
URU	Ariel Behar	ARG	Máximo González	93	4

- ^{1} Rankings are as of 19 September 2022.

=== Other entrants ===
The following pairs received wildcards into the doubles main draw:

- (Israel) Daniel Cukierman / (Israel) Edan Leshem
- (Serbia) Hamad Međedović / (Israel) Yshai Oliel

The following pair received entry as alternates:

- (Italy) Marco Bortolotti / (Spain) Sergio Martos Gornés

=== Withdrawals ===
- (France) Benjamin Bonzi / (France) Arthur Rinderknech → replaced by (Italy) Marco Bortolotti / (Spain) Sergio Martos Gornés
- (Argentina) Tomás Martín Etcheverry / (Spain) Albert Ramos Viñolas → replaced by (Serbia) Novak Djokovic / (Israel) Jonathan Erlich
