= Arne Thoms =

German tennis player (born 1971)

- Country (sports): Germany
- Residence: Hanover, Germany
- Born: 1 January 1971 (age 55) Osnabrück, West Germany
- Height: 1.88 m (6 ft 2 in)
- Turned pro: 1989
- Plays: Right-handed
- Prize money: $392,142

Singles
- Career record: 23–35
- Career titles: 0
- Highest ranking: No. 98 (18 May 1992)

Grand Slam singles results
- French Open: 1R (1992)
- Wimbledon: 2R (1992, 1994, 1995)

Doubles
- Career record: 8–17
- Career titles: 0
- Highest ranking: No. 169 (5 Jul 1993)

Arne Thoms (born 1 January 1971) is a former professional tennis player from Germany.

== Career ==
As a junior, Thoms had a good year in 1989, making the semi-finals of the boys' singles at Wimbledon and the quarter-finals at Roland Garros.

Thoms made his first big impression on the ATP Tour with his performance at the Manchester Open in 1991. He was a quarter-finalist, beating two top 30 players en route, Horst Skoff and Omar Camporese. The following year he had an upset win over world number six Ivan Lendl in the opening round of the 1992 Milan Indoor tournament, which he entered as a qualifier. He did well again at Manchester in 1992, reaching another quarter-final. The German was also a quarter-finalist at both Newport and Zaragoza in 1993 and at the 1994 CA-TennisTrophy in Vienna. His best showing as a doubles player came in the 1995 Tel Aviv Open, when he and partner Brent Larkham were semi-finalists.

He made the second round of three Wimbledon Championships during his career, with wins over Todd Witsken in 1992, Bernd Karbacher in 1994 and Eyal Erlich in 1995.

== Challenger titles ==
=== Singles: (4) ===
No.	Year	Tournament	Surface	Opponent	Score
1.	1991	Munich, Germany	Carpet	(Germany) Markus Naewie	4–6, 6–3, 6–4
2.	1994	Jerusalem, Israel	Hard	(Belgium) Filip Dewulf	4–6, 6–1, 6–4
3.	1996	Neumünster, Germany	Carpet	(United States) Jeff Salzenstein	6–4, 6–4
4.	1997	Lippstadt, Germany	Carpet	(Germany) Dirk Dier	7–6, 6–3

=== Doubles: (6) ===
No.	Year	Tournament	Surface	Partner	Opponents	Score
1.	1991	Brest, France	Hard	(Germany) Lars Koslowski	(Germany) Patrik Kühnen (Germany) Alexander Mronz	6–2, 1–6, 6–3
2.	1992	Dublin, Ireland	Hard	(Netherlands) Sander Groen	(Sweden) Douglas Geiwald (South Africa) Robbie Koenig	5–7, 6–4, 6–3
3.	1992	Munich, Germany	Carpet	(Netherlands) Sander Groen	(South Africa) Marcos Ondruska (South Africa) Grant Stafford	6–4, 7–6
4.	1993	Munich, Germany	Carpet	(Netherlands) Sander Groen	(Australia) Jon Ireland (United States) John Yancey	6–3, 6–3
5.	1994	Lippstadt, Germany	Carpet	(Germany) Alexander Mronz	(South Africa) Brent Haygarth (South Africa) Marius Barnard	6–2, 6–4
6.	1996	Wolfsburg, Germany	Carpet	(Germany) Dirk Dier	(United States) Jim Pugh (Netherlands) Joost Winnink	6–4, 6–4
