= Marcos Ondruska =

South African tennis player

- Country (sports): South Africa
- Born: 18 December 1972 (age 53) Bloemfontein, South Africa
- Height: 1.83 m (6 ft 0 in)
- Turned pro: 1989
- Retired: 2005
- Plays: Right-handed (two-handed backhand)
- Prize money: $1,835,129

Singles
- Career record: 118–147
- Career titles: 0
- Highest ranking: No. 27 (10 May 1993)

Grand Slam singles results
- Australian Open: 4R (1996)
- French Open: 3R (1991)
- Wimbledon: 2R (1993, 1994, 1997)
- US Open: 3R (1994, 1995)

Other tournaments
- Olympic Games: 2R (1996)

Doubles
- Career record: 113–133
- Career titles: 4
- Highest ranking: No. 34 (2 August 1993)

Grand Slam doubles results
- Australian Open: SF (1993)
- French Open: 2R (1993)
- Wimbledon: 3R (1993, 1994, 1995)
- US Open: 3R (1999)

Grand Slam mixed doubles results
- French Open: 2R (1993)
- Wimbledon: 3R (1996)

Marcos Ondruska (born 18 December 1972) is a former tennis player from South Africa, who turned professional in 1989. He represented his native country at the 1996 Summer Olympics in Atlanta, Georgia, where he defeated Goran Ivanišević in the first round before falling to Norway's Christian Ruud. The right-hander won four career titles in doubles, and reached his highest singles ATP-ranking on 10 May 1993, when he became the number 27 of the world and reached the semi-finals at the Miami Open.

Ondruska has a 13–7 career Davis Cup record in 11 ties.

== Junior Grand Slam finals ==
=== Singles: 1 (1 runner-up) ===
Result	Year	Tournament	Surface	Opponent	Score
Loss	1990	Wimbledon	Grass	(India) Leander Paes	5–7, 6–2, 4–6

=== Doubles: 2 (2 runner-ups) ===
Result	Year	Tournament	Surface	Partner	Opponents	Score
Loss	1990	French Open	Clay	(South Africa) Clinton Marsh	(Canada) Sébastien Lareau (Canada) Sébastien Leblanc	6–7, 7–6, 7–9
Loss	1990	Wimbledon	Grass	(South Africa) Clinton Marsh	(Canada) Sébastien Lareau (Canada) Sébastien Leblanc	6–7^{(5–7)}, 6–4, 3–6

== ATP career finals ==
=== Singles: 3 (3 runner-ups) ===
Legend Grand Slam Tournaments (0–0) ATP World Tour Finals (0–0) ATP World Tour Masters Series (0–0) ATP Championship Series (0–0) ATP World Series (0–3)	Finals by surface Hard (0–2) Clay (0–1) Grass (0–0) Carpet (0–0)	Finals by setting Outdoors (0–3) Indoors (0–0)

Result	W–L	Date	Tournament	Tier	Surface	Opponent	Score
Loss	0–1	Sep 1992	Cologne, Germany	World Series	Clay	(Germany) Bernd Karbacher	6–7^{(4–7)}, 4–6
Loss	0–2	Mar 1993	Scottsdale, United States	World Series	Hard	(United States) Andre Agassi	2–6, 6–3, 3–6
Loss	0–3	Oct 1996	Tel Aviv, Israel	World Series	Hard	(Spain) Javier Sánchez	4–6, 5–7

=== Doubles: 6 (4 titles, 2 runner-ups) ===
Legend Grand Slam Tournaments (0–0) ATP World Tour Finals (0–0) ATP Masters Series (0–0) ATP Championship Series (0–1) ATP World Series (4–1)	Finals by surface Hard (3–1) Clay (1–0) Grass (0–0) Carpet (0–1)	Finals by setting Outdoors (4–1) Indoors (0–1)

Result	W–L	Date	Tournament	Tier	Surface	Partner	Opponents	Score
Loss	0–1	Feb 1993	Philadelphia, United States	Championship Series	Carpet	(United States) Brad Pearce	(United States) Jim Grabb (United States) Richey Reneberg	7–6, 3–6, 0–6
Loss	0–2	Mar 1993	Durban, South Africa	World Series	Hard	(South Africa) Johan de Beer	(South Africa) Lan Bale (Zimbabwe) Wayne Black	6–7, 2–6
Win	1–2	Jan 1996	Auckland, New Zealand	World Series	Hard	(United States) Jack Waite	(Sweden) Jonas Björkman (New Zealand) Brett Steven	walkover
Win	2–2	Sep 1996	Palermo, Italy	World Series	Clay	(Australia) Andrew Kratzmann	(Italy) Cristian Brandi (Spain) Emilio Sánchez	7–6, 6–4
Win	3–2	Oct 1996	Tel Aviv, Israel	World Series	Hard	(South Africa) Grant Stafford	(Israel) Noam Behr (Israel) Eyal Erlich	6–3, 6–2
Win	4–2	Aug 1997	Long Island, United States	International Series	Hard	(Germany) David Prinosil	(United States) Mark Keil (United States) T. J. Middleton	6–4, 6–4

== ATP Challenger and ITF Futures finals ==
=== Singles: 8 (7–1) ===
Legend ATP Challenger (7–1) ITF Futures (0–0)	Finals by surface Hard (5–0) Clay (2–1) Grass (0–0) Carpet (0–0)

Result	W–L	Date	Tournament	Tier	Surface	Opponent	Score
Win	1–0	Aug 1989	Durbam, South Africa	Challenger	Hard	(Italy) Ugo Colombini	6–4, 6–4
Win	2–0	Sep 1991	Azores, Portugal	Challenger	Hard	(Sweden) Henrik Holm	6–3, 2–6, 7–6
Win	3–0	Jul 1992	Neu-Ulm, Germany	Challenger	Clay	(Germany) Marc-Kevin Goellner	7–6, 6–1
Loss	3–1	Sep 1992	Bucharest, Romania	Challenger	Clay	(Argentina) Horacio de la Peña	3–6, 0–6
Win	4–1	Nov 1992	Brest, France	Challenger	Hard	(Germany) Bernd Karbacher	5–7, 6–3, 6–0
Win	5–1	May 1998	Budapest, Hungary	Challenger	Clay	(Italy) Davide Sanguinetti	4–6, 7–5, 7–6
Win	6–1	Oct 1999	Houston, United States	Challenger	Hard	(Australia) James Sekulov	7–6, 6–1
Win	7–1	Nov 1999	Miami, United States	Challenger	Hard	(Czech Republic) Radek Štěpánek	6–2, 6–2

=== Doubles: 27 (14–13) ===
Legend ATP Challenger (13–12) ITF Futures (1–1)	Finals by surface Hard (6–3) Clay (7–5) Grass (1–2) Carpet (0–3)

Result	W–L	Date	Tournament	Tier	Surface	Partner	Opponents	Score
Win	1–0	Jul 1991	Salerno, Italy	Challenger	Clay	(Venezuela) Nicolás Pereira	(Spain) Emilio Benfele Álvarez (Italy) Pietro Pennisi	6–4, 6–4
Loss	1–1	Oct 1991	Cairo, Egypt	Challenger	Hard	(Zimbabwe) Byron Black	(Czech Republic) Martin Damm (Czech Republic) David Rikl	2–6, 3–6
Win	2–1	Sep 1992	Bucharest, Romania	Challenger	Clay	(Argentina) Horacio de la Peña	(France) Jean-Philippe Fleurian (Germany) Markus Naewie	6–4, 6–2
Loss	2–2	Nov 1992	Munich, Germany	Challenger	Carpet	(South Africa) Grant Stafford	(Netherlands) Sander Groen (Germany) Arne Thoms	4–6, 6–7
Loss	2–3	May 1994	Dresden, Germany	Challenger	Clay	(United States) Trevor Kronemann	(South Africa) Royce Deppe (United States) Jack Waite	4–6, 6–1, 3–6
Loss	2–4	Dec 1994	naples, United States	Challenger	Clay	(South Africa) Grant Stafford	(United States) Trevor Kronemann (Australia) David Macpherson	3–6, 6–7
Win	3–4	Sep 1996	Bad Saarow, Germany	Challenger	Clay	(Germany) Jens Knippschild	(South Africa) Paul Rosner (Netherlands) Joost Winnink	6–3, 6–3
Loss	3–5	Mar 1998	Magdeburg, Germany	Challenger	Carpet	(United Kingdom) Chris Wilkinson	(Israel) Eyal Erlich (Italy) Mosé Navarra	6–4, 1–6, 4–6
Loss	3–6	May 1998	Košice, Slovakia	Challenger	Clay	(Socialist Federal Republic of Yugoslavia) Nebojsa Djordjevic	(Czech Republic) Jiří Novák (Czech Republic) David Rikl	6–7, 4–6
Win	4–6	Jul 1998	Venice, Italy	Challenger	Clay	(Socialist Federal Republic of Yugoslavia) Nebojsa Djordjevic	(Netherlands) Sander Groen (Italy) Massimo Bertolini	1–6, 6–1, 6–2
Loss	4–7	Sep 1998	Edinburgh, United Kingdom	Challenger	Clay	(United Kingdom) Chris Wilkinson	(Netherlands) Edwin Kempes (Netherlands) Peter Wessels	7–6, 3–6, 2–6
Win	5–7	Nov 1998	Brest, France	Challenger	Hard	(South Africa) Neville Godwin	(United States) Justin Gimelstob (United States) Brian Macphie	6–4, 5–7, 6–4
Win	6–7	Nov 1998	Las Vegas, United States	Challenger	Hard	(South Africa) Byron Talbot	(United States) David Di Lucia (United States) Michael Sell	7–6, 6–3
Loss	6–8	Feb 1999	Lucknow, India	Challenger	Grass	(United Kingdom) Andrew Richardson	(Portugal) Nuno Marques (Belgium) Tom Vanhoudt	4–6, 7–5, 1–6
Win	7–8	Apr 1999	Napoli, Italy	Challenger	Clay	(United States) Jack Waite	(Italy) Cristian Brandi (Italy) Massimo Bertolini	6–4, 7–6
Win	8–8	Jun 1999	Fürth, Germany	Challenger	Clay	(Socialist Federal Republic of Yugoslavia) Nebojsa Djordjevic	(Argentina) Diego del Río (Argentina) Martín Rodríguez	4–6, 6–3, 6–4
Win	9–8	Jul 1999	Ostend, Belgium	Challenger	Clay	(Australia) Steven Randjelovic	(Belgium) Xavier Malisse (Belgium) Wim Neefs	6–2, 6–4
Win	10–8	Sep 1999	Austin, United States	Challenger	Hard	(South Africa) Wesley Whitehouse	(United States) Paul Goldstein (United States) Adam Peterson	7–5, 4–6, 6–2
Win	11–8	Jun 2000	Surbiton, United Kingdom	Challenger	Grass	(South Africa) Jeff Coetzee	(United States) Jared Palmer (United States) Jonathan Stark	7–6^{(7–3)}, 7–6^{(8–6)}
Win	12–8	Sep 2000	Houston, United States	Challenger	Hard	(South Africa) Brent Haygarth	(United States) James Blake (United States) Kevin Kim	6–4, 6–2
Win	13–8	Nov 2000	Las Vegas, United States	Challenger	Hard	(South Africa) Jeff Coetzee	(United States) Mardy Fish (United States) Andy Roddick	6–7^{(9–11)}, 7–6^{(8–6)}, 6–1
Loss	13–9	Nov 2000	Knoxville, United States	Challenger	Hard	(South Africa) Jeff Coetzee	(Germany) Karsten Braasch (Germany) Michael Kohlmann	0–6, 6–7^{(4–7)}
Loss	13–10	Jun 2001	Surbiton, United Kingdom	Challenger	Grass	(South Africa) Jeff Coetzee	(South Africa) David Adams (Australia) Ben Ellwood	6–7^{(5–7)}, 4–6
Loss	13–11	Aug 2001	Segovia, Spain	Challenger	Hard	(South Africa) Neville Godwin	(South Africa) Wesley Moodie (South Africa) Shaun Rudman	6–7^{(5–7)}, 3–6
Loss	13–12	Nov 2001	Aachen, Germany	Challenger	Carpet	(Germany) Marc-Kevin Goellner	(Austria) Julian Knowle (Germany) Michael Kohlmann	3–6, 6–7^{(4–7)}
Loss	13–13	May 2003	USA F11, Orange Park	Futures	Clay	(United States) Brendan Evans	(United States) Brian Baker (United States) Phillip Simmonds	6–4, 5–7, 4–6
Win	14–13	May 2005	Korea F1, Seogwipo	Futures	Hard	(Slovenia) Luka Gregorc	(South Korea) Kyu-Tae Im (New Zealand) Mark Nielsen	7–5, 3–6, 6–2

== Performance timelines ==
Key
W	F	SF	QF	#R	RR	Q#	DNQ	A	NH

(W) winner; (F) finalist; (SF) semifinalist; (QF) quarterfinalist; (#R) rounds 4, 3, 2, 1; (RR) round-robin stage; (Q#) qualification round; (DNQ) did not qualify; (A) absent; (NH) not held; (SR) strike rate (events won / competed); (W–L) win–loss record.

=== Singles ===
Tournament	1990	1991	1992	1993	1994	1995	1996	1997	1998	1999	2000	2001	SR	W–L	Win %
Grand Slam tournaments
Australian Open	A	Q2	A	1R	2R	3R	4R	1R	1R	1R	Q3	1R	0 / 8	6–8	43%
French Open	A	3R	A	2R	1R	1R	1R	2R	A	Q2	Q2	2R	0 / 7	5–7	42%
Wimbledon	Q3	Q1	1R	2R	2R	1R	1R	2R	A	A	Q2	Q3	0 / 6	3–6	33%
US Open	A	1R	Q1	1R	3R	3R	1R	2R	1R	Q1	Q1	Q1	0 / 7	5–7	42%
Win–loss	0–0	2–2	0–1	2–4	4–4	4–4	3–4	3–4	0–2	0–1	0–0	1–2	0 / 28	19–28	40%
National Representation
Summer Olympics	NH		A	Not Held			2R	Not Held			A	NH	0 / 1	1–1	50%
ATP Masters Series
Indian Wells	A	A	2R	A	2R	Q3	Q1	Q2	A	A	1R	Q1	0 / 3	2–3	40%
Miami	A	A	1R	SF	1R	3R	2R	1R	Q1	A	Q2	A	0 / 6	8–6	57%
Monte Carlo	A	A	A	2R	1R	A	A	A	A	Q1	A	A	0 / 2	1–2	33%
Hamburg	A	A	A	3R	A	A	A	A	A	A	A	A	0 / 1	2–1	67%
Rome	A	A	A	1R	A	A	A	A	A	A	A	A	0 / 1	0–1	0%
Canada	A	A	A	A	A	A	A	2R	1R	A	A	A	0 / 2	1–2	33%
Cincinnati	2R	2R	A	A	A	A	A	A	2R	A	Q2	A	0 / 3	3–3	50%
Paris	A	A	A	1R	A	A	A	A	A	A	A	A	0 / 1	0–1	0%
Win–loss	1–1	1–1	1–2	8–5	1–3	2–1	1–1	1–2	1–2	0–0	0–1	0–0	0 / 19	17–19	47%

=== Doubles ===
Tournament	1991	1992	1993	1994	1995	1996	1997	1998	1999	2000	2001	SR	W–L	Win %
Grand Slam tournaments
Australian Open	A	A	SF	1R	QF	2R	2R	1R	1R	2R	1R	0 / 9	10–9	53%
French Open	A	A	2R	1R	A	1R	1R	A	1R	1R	1R	0 / 7	1–7	13%
Wimbledon	A	2R	3R	3R	3R	1R	2R	A	A	1R	Q2	0 / 7	8–7	53%
US Open	A	A	1R	1R	1R	A	1R	2R	3R	1R	1R	0 / 8	3–8	27%
Win–loss	0–0	1–1	7–4	2–4	5–3	1–3	2–4	1–2	2–3	1–4	0–3	0 / 31	22–31	42%
ATP Masters Series
Indian Wells	A	A	A	1R	1R	QF	1R	A	A	Q1	A	0 / 4	2–4	33%
Miami	A	2R	2R	1R	2R	2R	2R	1R	A	1R	A	0 / 8	4–8	33%
Monte Carlo	A	A	1R	SF	A	A	A	A	A	A	A	0 / 2	3–2	60%
Rome	A	A	QF	A	A	A	A	A	A	A	A	0 / 1	2–1	67%
Canada	A	A	A	A	A	A	1R	A	A	A	A	0 / 1	0–1	0%
Cincinnati	2R	A	A	A	A	A	A	1R	A	Q2	A	0 / 2	1–2	33%
Paris	A	A	2R	A	A	A	A	A	A	A	A	0 / 1	1–1	50%
Win–loss	1–1	1–1	3–4	3–3	1–2	3–2	1–3	0–2	0–0	0–1	0–0	0 / 19	13–19	41%
