= Nuno Marques =

Portuguese tennis player (born 1970)

- Country (sports): Portugal
- Residence: Porto, Portugal
- Born: 9 April 1970 (age 55); Porto, Portugal
- Height: 1.90 m (6 ft 3 in)
- Turned pro: 1986
- Retired: 2001
- Plays: Left-handed
- Prize money: US$ 857,479

Singles
- Career record: 51–99 (34%)
- Career titles: 0
- Highest ranking: No. 86 (25 September 1995)

Grand Slam singles results
- Australian Open: 2R (1991)
- French Open: 2R (1990)
- Wimbledon: 1R (1991, 1995, 1997, 1999)
- US Open: 2R (1991, 1995)

Doubles
- Career record: 55–76 (42%)
- Career titles: 1
- Highest ranking: No. 58 (21 April 1997)

Grand Slam doubles results
- Australian Open: QF (2000)
- French Open: 1R (1995, 1997, 2000)
- Wimbledon: 2R (1995, 1998)
- US Open: 2R (1999)

Other doubles tournaments
- Olympic Games: 1R (2000)

Nuno Miguel Bacelar de Vasconcelos Marques (born 9 April 1970) is a Portuguese former tennis player. He was the first Portuguese to reach the top 100 ATP rankings and held the record of highest ranked Portuguese player in history until Frederico Gil surpassed him in 2009. Also, he was the highest ranked Portuguese doubles player in history reaching a career high of no. 58 until 2019, when he was surpassed by João Sousa.

== Career finals ==
=== Doubles: 3 (1 title, 2 runners-up) ===
Legend Grand Slam Tournaments (0–0) ATP Tour World Championships (0–0) ATP Masters Series (0–0) ATP International Series Gold (0–0) ATP International Series (1–2)	Titles by surface Hard (0–1) Clay (1–0) Grass (0–1) Carpet (0–0)

Result	W/L	Date	Tournament	Surface	Partner	Opponents	Score
Loss	0–1	Jul 1995	Newport, United States	Grass	(Australia) Paul Kilderry	(Germany) Markus Zoecke (Germany) Jörn Renzenbrink	6–1, 6–2
Loss	0–2	Sep 1996	Bournemouth, United Kingdom	Hard	(France) Rodolphe Gilbert	(United Kingdom) Greg Rusedski (Germany) Marc-Kevin Goellner	6–3, 7–6
Win	1–2	Mar 1997	Casablanca, Morocco	Clay	(Portugal) João Cunha e Silva	(Morocco) Karim Alami (Morocco) Hicham Arazi	7–6, 6–2

== Singles performance timeline ==
Key
W	F	SF	QF	#R	RR	Q#	P#	DNQ	A	Z#	PO	G	S	B	NMS	NTI	P	NH

(W) winner; (F) finalist; (SF) semifinalist; (QF) quarterfinalist; (#R) rounds 4, 3, 2, 1; (RR) round-robin stage; (Q#) qualification round; (P#) preliminary round; (DNQ) did not qualify; (A) absent; (Z#) Davis/Fed Cup Zonal Group (with number indication) or (PO) play-off; (G) gold, (S) silver or (B) bronze Olympic/Paralympic medal; (NMS) not a Masters tournament; (NTI) not a Tier I tournament; (P) postponed; (NH) not held; (SR) strike rate (events won / competed); (W–L) win–loss record.

Tournament	1986	1987	1988	1989	1990	1991	1992	1993	1994	1995	1996	1997	1998	1999	2000	2001	2002	SR	W–L	Win %
Grand Slam tournaments
Australian Open	A	A	A	1R	A	2R	A	A	A	A	1R	A	A	A	A	A	A	0 / 3	1–3	25%
French Open	A	A	A	1R	2R	1R	A	A	A	A	A	A	A	A	A	A	A	0 / 3	1–3	25%
Wimbledon	A	A	A	A	A	1R	A	A	A	1R	A	1R	A	1R	A	A	A	0 / 4	0–4	0%
US Open	A	A	1R	A	A	2R	A	A	A	2R	A	A	A	A	A	A	A	0 / 3	2–3	40%
Win–loss	0–0	0–0	0–1	0–2	1–1	2–4	0–0	0–0	0–0	1–2	0–1	0–1	0–0	0–1	0–0	0–0	0–0	0 / 13	4–13	24%
Grand Prix Championship Series / Super 9 tournaments
Miami	A	A	A	A	A	2R	A	A	A	A	A	A	A	A	A	A	A	0 / 1	1–1	50%
Monte Carlo	A	A	A	A	A	A	A	A	A	A	A	1R	A	A	A	A	A	0 / 1	0–1	0%
Rome	A	A	A	1R	A	A	A	A	A	A	A	A	A	A	A	A	A	0 / 1	0–1	0%
Cincinnati	A	A	A	1R	A	A	A	A	A	A	A	A	A	A	A	A	A	0 / 1	0–1	0%
Win–loss	0–0	0–0	0–0	0–2	0–0	1–1	0–0	0–0	0–0	0–0	0–0	0–1	0–0	0–0	0–0	0–0	0–0	0 / 4	1–4	20%
National representation
Summer Olympics	Not Held		A	Not Held			A	Not Held			A	Not Held			A	Not Held		0 / 0	0–0	N/A
Davis Cup	ZA	ZB	Z1	Z1	Z1	Z1	Z1	Z1	PO	A	Z2	Z2	Z2	Z1	Z1	Z1	Z1	0 / 16	21–18	54%
Career statistics
Overall win–loss	0–2	2–2	2–4	5–10	5–9	11–15	1–2	1–2	2–6	6–15	7–16	4–10	3–2	2–3	0–1	0–0	0–0	N/A	51–99	34%
Win (%)	0%	50%	33%	33%	36%	44%	33%	33%	25%	29%	30%	29%	60%	40%	0%	N/A	N/A	34.00%		
Year-end ranking	870	318	219	158	102	148	315	215	165	92	124	215	228	342	704	982	858	$ 857,262		

== Awards ==
- 2013 – ITF Commitment Award
