= Noam Behr =

Israeli tennis player (born 1975)

- Native name: נועם בר
- Country (sports): Israel
- Residence: Tel Aviv, Israel
- Born: 13 October 1975 (age 50) Tel Aviv, Israel
- Height: 1.88 m (6 ft 2 in)
- Turned pro: 1994
- Plays: Left-handed
- Prize money: $296,906

Singles
- Career record: 6–14
- Career titles: 0; 1 Challenger, 2 Futures
- Highest ranking: No. 127 (8 October 2001)

Grand Slam singles results
- Australian Open: Q3 (1996)
- French Open: Q3 (1998)
- Wimbledon: Q1 (1996, 1997, 2000, 2001, 2002, 2003)
- US Open: 1R (1998)

Doubles
- Career record: 8–20
- Career titles: 0; 14 Challenger, 2 Futures
- Highest ranking: No. 109 (11 October 1999)

Grand Slam doubles results
- Australian Open: 1R (2000)
- French Open: 1R (2001)
- Wimbledon: 1R (2000, 2001)
- US Open: 1R (2001)
- Last updated on: 12 May 2022.

Noam Behr (Hebrew: נועם בר; born 13 October 1975) is an Israeli professional tennis player who turned pro in 1994.

His career-high singles ranking was No. 127 (October 2001), and his career-high doubles ranking was No. 109 (October 1999).

== Tennis career ==
Most of Behr's success was on the Challenger and Futures level, but he often participated in qualifying tournaments of major ATP events.

In 1992, he reached the finals of the US Open boys' singles, losing 7–5, 6–2 to Brian Dunn of the United States. He and Yshai Oliel, who reached the boys' singles final at the 2017 Australian Open, are the only two Israelis to have reached the finals in a boys' Grand Slam event.

In October 1995, he upset world No. 97 Jeff Tarango in Tel Aviv, 6–4, 3–6, 7–5. In October 1998 he and Eyal Ran won in Uzbekistan. In December 1998 and February and April 1999, he and Ran won in Mumbai, Calcutta, and New Delhi, India. In October, he and Ran won in Tel Aviv, and he and Andrei Stoliarov won in Uzbekistan.

In July 2000, he and partner Eyal Erlich won in Istanbul, Turkey. In October 2000 in Germany, he defeated world No. 66 Martin Damm, 3–6, 6–1, 6–4. That same month he and partner Aisam-ul-Haq Qureshi of Pakistan won in Nevers, France. In July 2001 in Toronto, he beat world No. 53 David Prinosil, 6–1, 7–6^{(2)}. In September in Shanghai, he beat world No. 80 Andrew Ilie 7–5, 6–4. In January 2001, he and Andy Ram won in Aventura, Florida. In March, he and Noam Okun won in Kyoto, Japan, and in Hamilton, New Zealand.

In April 2002, he and Ota Fukárek won the doubles in Leon, Mexico. In July 2002, he and partner Michael Joyce won a tournament in Quebec, Canada. He was eliminated in qualifiers at the 2002 US Open.

Behr is now the coach of Ram and Erhlich.

=== Davis Cup ===
Behr was 6–7 in Davis Cup play for Israel from 1995 to 2001.

== Junior Grand Slam finals ==
=== Singles: 1 (1 runner-up) ===
| Result | Year | Tournament | Surface | Opponent | Score |
|---|---|---|---|---|---|
| Loss | 1992 | US Open | Hard | (United States) Brian Dunn | 5–7, 2–6 |

== ATP career finals ==
=== Doubles: 1 (1 runner-up) ===
| Legend Grand Slam Tournaments (0–0) ATP World Tour Finals (0–0) ATP Masters Series (0–0) ATP Championship Series (0–0) ATP World Series (0–1) | Finals by surface Hard (0–1) Clay (0–0) Grass (0–0) Carpet (0–0) | Finals by setting Outdoors (0–1) Indoors (0–0) |

| Result | W–L | Date | Tournament | Tier | Surface | Partner | Opponents | Score |
|---|---|---|---|---|---|---|---|---|
| Loss | 0–1 | Oct 1996 | Tel Aviv, Israel | World Series | Hard | (Israel) Eyal Erlich | (South Africa) Marcos Ondruska (South Africa) Grant Stafford | 3–6, 2–6 |

== ATP Challenger and ITF Futures finals ==
=== Singles: 10 (3–7) ===
| Legend ATP Challenger (1–4) ITF Futures (2–3) | Finals by surface Hard (3–5) Clay (0–1) Grass (0–0) Carpet (0–1) |

| Result | W–L | Date | Tournament | Tier | Surface | Opponent | Score |
|---|---|---|---|---|---|---|---|
| Loss | 0–1 | Apr 1996 | Fergana, Uzbekistan | Challenger | Hard | (France) Stéphane Simian | 6–7, 6–7 |
| Loss | 0–2 | Mar 1998 | Israel F1, Jaffa | Futures | Hard | (Israel) Harel Levy | 3–6, 2–6 |
| Win | 1–2 | Mar 1999 | Israel F2, Ashkelon | Futures | Hard | (Israel) Oren Motevassel | 6–3, 7–6 |
| Loss | 1–3 | Jun 2000 | USA F14, Tampa | Futures | Clay | (France) Cedric Kauffmann | 3–6, 3–6 |
| Loss | 1–4 | Oct 2000 | France F20, Nevers | Futures | Hard | (France) Jérôme Haehnel | 7–6^{(11–9)}, 5–7, 3–6 |
| Win | 2–4 | Oct 2000 | Bukhara, Uzbekistan | Challenger | Hard | (Belarus) Alexander Shvets | 4–6, 7–6^{(7–3)}, 6–0 |
| Win | 3–4 | Jul 2001 | Turkey F2, Istanbul | Futures | Hard | (Uzbekistan) Dmitriy Tomashevich | 6–4, 6–2 |
| Loss | 3–5 | Aug 2001 | Binghamton, United States | Challenger | Hard | (France) Cedric Kauffmann | 5–7, 1–6 |
| Loss | 3–6 | Jul 2002 | Aptos, United States | Challenger | Hard | (United States) Brian Vahaly | 6–2, 3–6, 2–6 |
| Loss | 3–7 | Mar 2003 | Kyoto, Japan | Challenger | Carpet | (Czech Republic) Michal Tabara | 2–6, 2–6 |

=== Doubles: 38 (16–22) ===
| Legend ATP Challenger (14–16) ITF Futures (2–6) | Finals by surface Hard (0–0) Clay (0–0) Grass (0–0) Carpet (0–0) |

| Result | W–L | Date | Tournament | Tier | Surface | Partner | Opponents | Score |
|---|---|---|---|---|---|---|---|---|
| Loss | 0–1 | Aug 1995 | Brasília, Brazil | Challenger | Hard | (Israel) Lior Mor | (France) Jean-Philippe Fleurian (Venezuela) Nicolás Pereira | 6–7, 2–6 |
| Loss | 0–2 | Sep 1995 | Tashkent, Uzbekistan | Challenger | Clay | (Israel) Eyal Ran | (United States) Brian Dunn (Hungary) Attila Sávolt | 3–6, 2–6 |
| Loss | 0–3 | May 1996 | Jerusalem, Israel | Challenger | Hard | (Israel) Eyal Ran | (South Africa) Neville Godwin (India) Leander Paes | 6–7, 5–7 |
| Loss | 0–4 | Jul 1997 | Manchester, United Kingdom | Challenger | Grass | (Switzerland) Filippo Veglio | (United Kingdom) Mark Petchey (United Kingdom) Danny Sapsford | 3–6, 7–6, 6–7 |
| Win | 1–4 | May 1998 | Jerusalem, Israel | Challenger | Hard | (Israel) Eyal Erlich | (South Africa) Neville Godwin (South Africa) David Nainkin | walkover |
| Win | 2–4 | Oct 1998 | Samarkand, Uzbekistan | Challenger | Clay | (Israel) Eyal Ran | (Russia) Andrey Merinov (Russia) Andrei Stoliarov | 1–6, 6–4, 7–6 |
| Loss | 2–5 | Dec 1998 | Ahmedabad, India | Challenger | Hard | (Israel) Eyal Ran | (Israel) Noam Okun (Israel) Nir Welgreen | 6–3, 0–6, 4–6 |
| Win | 3–5 | Jan 1999 | Bombay, India | Challenger | Hard | (Israel) Eyal Ran | (India) Mahesh Bhupathi (India) Gaurav Natekar | 6–2, 7–6 |
| Win | 4–5 | Feb 1999 | Calcutta, India | Challenger | Grass | (Israel) Eyal Ran | (United Kingdom) Barry Cowan (South Africa) Wesley Whitehouse | 6–4, 6–7, 6–2 |
| Win | 5–5 | Apr 1999 | New Delhi, India | Challenger | Hard | (Israel) Eyal Ran | (United Kingdom) Barry Cowan (South Africa) Wesley Whitehouse | 6–3, 4–6, 6–4 |
| Loss | 5–6 | May 1999 | Espinho, Portugal | Challenger | Clay | (Israel) Eyal Ran | (Spain) Joan Balcells (Argentina) Gastón Etlis | 3–6, 2–6 |
| Loss | 5–7 | Jul 1999 | Córdoba, Spain | Challenger | Hard | (Israel) Eyal Ran | (Uzbekistan) Oleg Ogorodov (Japan) Satoshi Iwabuchi | 3–6, 2–6 |
| Win | 6–7 | Oct 1999 | Tel Aviv, Israel | Challenger | Hard | (Israel) Eyal Ran | (Israel) Amir Hadad (Australia) Andrew Ilie | 6–3, 6–2 |
| Win | 7–7 | Oct 1999 | Samarkand, Uzbekistan | Challenger | Clay | (Russia) Andrei Stoliarov | (Spain) Emilio Benfele Álvarez (Belgium) Kris Goossens | 6–7, 6–3, 6–1 |
| Loss | 7–8 | May 2000 | Jerusalem, Israel | Challenger | Hard | (Israel) Eyal Ran | (South Africa) Kevin Ullyett (South Africa) Neville Godwin | 6–7^{(4–7)}, 6–7^{(3–7)} |
| Loss | 7–9 | Jun 2000 | Denver, United States | Challenger | Hard | (Israel) Andy Ram | (Israel) Lior Mor (Israel) Jonathan Erlich | 4–6, 7–5, 2–6 |
| Loss | 7–10 | Jul 2000 | Bristol, United Kingdom | Challenger | Grass | (Israel) Eyal Erlich | (Australia) Jordan Kerr (South Africa) Damien Roberts | 3–6, 6–1, 3–6 |
| Win | 8–10 | Jul 2000 | Istanbul, Turkey | Challenger | Hard | (Israel) Eyal Erlich | (Uzbekistan) Oleg Ogorodov (Uzbekistan) Vadim Kutsenko | 6–7^{(5–7)}, 6–3, 6–3 |
| Loss | 8–11 | Oct 2000 | France F19, Plaisir | Futures | Hard | (Pakistan) Aisam Qureshi | (France) Julien Benneteau (France) Nicolas Mahut | 3–6, 6–7^{(5–7)} |
| Win | 9–11 | Oct 2000 | France F20, Nevers | Futures | Hard | (Pakistan) Aisam Qureshi | (Canada) David Abelson (Czech Republic) Martin Štěpánek | 6–2, 6–1 |
| Loss | 9–12 | Oct 2000 | Bukhara, Uzbekistan | Challenger | Hard | (Pakistan) Aisam Qureshi | (Uzbekistan) Oleg Ogorodov (Uzbekistan) Vadim Kutsenko | 4–6, 6–7^{(5–7)} |
| Loss | 9–13 | Dec 2000 | Urbana, United States | Challenger | Hard | (United States) Michael Russell | (United States) Taylor Dent (United States) Mardy Fish | walkover |
| Win | 10–13 | Jan 2001 | USA F2, Delray Beach | Futures | Hard | (Israel) Andy Ram | (Slovenia) Andrej Kračman (Croatia) Lovro Zovko | 6–4, 6–7^{(4–7)}, 7–6^{(7–4)} |
| Loss | 10–14 | Jan 2001 | USA F3, Hallandale Beach | Futures | Hard | (Italy) Giorgio Galimberti | (Canada) Frédéric Niemeyer (Canada) Jocelyn Robichaud | 6–7^{(4–7)}, 3–6 |
| Loss | 10–15 | Feb 2001 | Andrézieux, France | Challenger | Hard | (Israel) Jonathan Erlich | (France) Julien Benneteau (France) Nicolas Mahut | 3–6, 3–6 |
| Win | 11–15 | Mar 2001 | Kyoto, Japan | Challenger | Carpet | (Israel) Noam Okun | (United States) Kelly Gullett (United States) Brandon Hawk | 6–3, 7–5 |
| Win | 12–15 | Mar 2001 | Hamilton, New Zealand | Challenger | Hard | (Israel) Noam Okun | (Italy) Filippo Messori (Finland) Tuomas Ketola | 7–6^{(7–4)}, 6–4 |
| Loss | 12–16 | May 2001 | Jerusalem, Israel | Challenger | Hard | (Israel) Noam Okun | (Israel) Jonathan Erlich (France) Michaël Llodra | 5–7, 6–4, 6–7^{(2–7)} |
| Loss | 12–17 | May 2001 | Prague, Czech Republic | Challenger | Clay | (Israel) Andy Ram | (Czech Republic) Jaroslav Levinský (Czech Republic) Michal Navrátil | 3–6, 1–6 |
| Win | 13–17 | Mar 2002 | Cherbourg, France | Challenger | Hard | (Israel) Jonathan Erlich | (France) Julien Benneteau (France) Lionel Roux | walkover |
| Win | 14–17 | Apr 2002 | León, Mexico | Challenger | Hard | (Czech Republic) Ota Fukárek | (Switzerland) Yves Allegro (Germany) Alexander Waske | 7–6^{(8–6)}, 6–3 |
| Win | 15–17 | Jul 2002 | Granby, Canada | Challenger | Hard | (United States) Michael Joyce | (France) Thomas Dupre (Canada) Simon Larose | 6–0, 6–3 |
| Loss | 15–18 | Sep 2002 | Istanbul, Turkey | Challenger | Hard | (Czech Republic) Tomáš Zíb | (North Macedonia) Aleksandar Kitinov (Croatia) Lovro Zovko | 6–4, 4–6, 2–6 |
| Win | 16–18 | Aug 2003 | Graz, Austria | Challenger | Hard | (Czech Republic) Ota Fukárek | (Germany) Karsten Braasch (Sweden) Johan Landsberg | 6–3, 6–2 |
| Loss | 16–19 | Nov 2010 | Israel F4, Ramat HaSharon | Futures | Hard | (Israel) Tal Eros | (Germany) Kevin Krawietz (Russia) Sergei Krotiouk | 6–2, 4–6, [5–10] |
| Loss | 16–20 | Jun 2011 | Israel F6, Ashkelon | Futures | Hard | (Israel) Igor Smilansky | (Republic of Ireland) James Cluskey (United States) John Paul Fruttero | 3–6, 0–6 |
| Loss | 16–21 | May 2012 | Israel F8, Ramat HaSharon | Futures | Hard | (Israel) Noam Okun | (Chinese Taipei) Chen Ti (Australia) Marcus Daniell | 6–7^{(1–7)}, ret. |
| Loss | 16–22 | May 2014 | Israel F8, Ashkelon | Futures | Hard | (Israel) Edan Bakshi | (Slovenia) Tom Kočevar-Dešman (Germany) Timon Reichelt | 4–6, 4–6 |

== Performance timeline ==
Key
| W | F | SF | QF | #R | RR | Q# | DNQ | A | NH |

(W) winner; (F) finalist; (SF) semifinalist; (QF) quarterfinalist; (#R) rounds 4, 3, 2, 1; (RR) round-robin stage; (Q#) qualification round; (DNQ) did not qualify; (A) absent; (NH) not held; (SR) strike rate (events won / competed); (W–L) win–loss record.

=== Singles ===
| Tournament | 1996 | 1997 | 1998 | 1999 | 2000 | 2001 | 2002 | 2003 | SR | W–L | Win % |
|---|---|---|---|---|---|---|---|---|---|---|---|
Grand Slam tournaments
| Australian Open | Q3 | A | A | A | Q2 | A | Q1 | A | 0 / 0 | 0–0 | – |
| French Open | A | A | Q3 | Q1 | A | Q2 | Q1 | A | 0 / 0 | 0–0 | – |
| Wimbledon | Q1 | Q1 | A | A | Q1 | Q1 | Q1 | Q1 | 0 / 0 | 0–0 | – |
| US Open | Q1 | A | 1R | Q1 | Q2 | Q2 | Q2 | A | 0 / 1 | 0–1 | 0% |
| Win–loss | 0–0 | 0–0 | 0–1 | 0–0 | 0–0 | 0–0 | 0–0 | 0–0 | 0 / 1 | 0–1 | 0% |
ATP Tour Masters 1000
| Canada | A | A | A | A | A | 2R | Q2 | A | 0 / 1 | 1–1 | 50% |
| Win–loss | 0–0 | 0–0 | 0–0 | 0–0 | 0–0 | 1–1 | 0–0 | 0–0 | 0 / 1 | 1–1 | 50% |

== See also ==
- List of select Jewish tennis players
