= Grant Stafford =

South African tennis player

- Country (sports): South Africa
- Residence: Alpharetta, Georgia, United States
- Born: 27 May 1971 (age 55) Johannesburg, South Africa
- Height: 1.88 m (6 ft 2 in)
- Turned pro: 1990
- Retired: 2000
- Plays: Right-handed (two-handed backhand)
- Prize money: $1,307,208

Singles
- Career record: 83-117
- Career titles: 0
- Highest ranking: No. 53 (31 January 1994)

Grand Slam singles results
- Australian Open: 4R (1994)
- French Open: 1R (1994, 1997, 1998)
- Wimbledon: 3R (1992)
- US Open: 2R (1991, 1997)

Doubles
- Career record: 109–109
- Career titles: 5
- Highest ranking: No. 42 (14 September 1998)

Grand Slam doubles results
- Australian Open: QF (1995)
- French Open: 2R (1998, 1999)
- Wimbledon: 2R (1997, 1998, 1999)
- US Open: QF (2000)

Grand Slam mixed doubles results
- French Open: SF (1999)
- Wimbledon: 2R (1998, 2001)
- Last updated on: 12 December 2021.

Grant Stafford (born 27 May 1971) is a former tennis player from South Africa.

Turning professional in 1990, Stafford won five doubles titles during his career. The right-hander reached his career-high singles ranking on the ATP Tour of World No. 53 in January 1994.

== Junior Grand Slam finals ==
=== Doubles: 1 (1 title) ===
Result	Year	Tournament	Surface	Partner	Opponents	Score
Win	1989	US Open	Hard	(South Africa) Wayne Ferreira	(Czech Republic) Martin Damm (Czech Republic) Jan Kodeš	6–3, 6–4

== ATP career finals ==
=== Singles: 3 (3 runner-ups) ===
Legend Grand Slam Tournaments (0–0) ATP World Tour Finals (0–0) ATP World Tour Masters Series (0–0) ATP Championship Series (0–0) ATP World Series (0–3)	Finals by surface Hard (0–1) Clay (0–1) Grass (0–1) Carpet (0–0)	Finals by setting Outdoors (0–3) Indoors (0–0)

Result	W–L	Date	Tournament	Tier	Surface	Opponent	Score
Loss	0–1	Apr 1993	Durban, South Africa	World Series	Hard	(United States) Aaron Krickstein	3–6, 6–7^{(7–9)}
Loss	0–2	Jul 1996	Newport, United States	World Series	Grass	(Venezuela) Nicolás Pereira	6–4, 4–6, 4–6
Loss	0–3	Apr 1997	Orlando, United States	World Series	Clay	(United States) Michael Chang	6–4, 2–6, 1–6

=== Doubles: 6 (5 titles, 1 runner-up) ===
Legend Grand Slam Tournaments (0–0) ATP World Tour Finals (0–0) ATP Masters Series (0–0) ATP Championship Series (1–0) ATP World Series (4–1)	Finals by surface Hard (3–1) Clay (2–0) Grass (0–0) Carpet (0–0)	Finals by setting Outdoors (5–1) Indoors (0–0)

Result	W–L	Date	Tournament	Tier	Surface	Partner	Opponents	Score
Loss	0–1	Apr 1994	Sun City, South Africa	World Series	Hard	(South Africa) Ellis Ferreira	(South Africa) Marius Barnard (South Africa) Brent Haygarth	3–6, 5–7
Win	1–1	Oct 1996	Tel Aviv Open, Israel	World Series	Hard	(South Africa) Marcos Ondruska	(Israel) Noam Behr (Israel) Eyal Erlich	6–3, 6–2
Win	2–1	Apr 1998	Orlando, United States	World Series	Clay	(South Africa) Kevin Ullyett	(Australia) Michael Tebbutt (Sweden) Mikael Tillström	4–6, 6–4, 7–5
Win	3–1	May 1998	Coral Springs, United States	World Series	Clay	(South Africa) Kevin Ullyett	(The Bahamas) Mark Merklein (United States) Vince Spadea	7–5, 6–4
Win	4–1	Jul 1998	Washington, United States	Championship Series	Hard	(South Africa) Kevin Ullyett	(South Africa) Wayne Ferreira (United States) Patrick Galbraith	6–3, 7–5
Win	5–1	Jan 2001	Adelaide, Australia	World Series	Hard	(Australia) David Macpherson	(Australia) Wayne Arthurs (Australia) Todd Woodbridge	6–7^{(5–7)}, 6–4, 6–4

== ATP Challenger and ITF Futures Finals ==
=== Singles: 5 (3–2) ===
Legend ATP Challenger (3–2) ITF Futures (0–0)	Finals by surface Hard (3–2) Clay (0–0) Grass (0–0) Carpet (0–0)

Result	W–L	Date	Tournament	Tier	Surface	Opponent	Score
Loss	0–1	Apr 1990	Durban, South Africa	Challenger	Hard	(United Kingdom) Jeremy Bates	4–6, 1–6
Win	1–1	Apr 1996	West Bloomfield, United States	Challenger	Hard	(Armenia) Sargis Sargsian	6–4, 6–2
Win	2–1	May 1996	Andijan, Uzbekistan	Challenger	Hard	(France) Stéphane Simian	6–2, 6–7, 6–4
Win	3–1	May 1996	Jerusalem, Israel	Challenger	Hard	(South Africa) Chris Haggard	6–4, 6–3
Loss	3–2	Sep 1996	Aruba, Aruba	Challenger	Hard	(United States) Vince Spadea	3–6, 5–7

=== Doubles: 12 (6–6) ===
Legend ATP Challenger (6–6) ITF Futures (0–0)	Finals by surface Hard (4–3) Clay (1–2) Grass (0–0) Carpet (1–1)

Result	W–L	Date	Tournament	Tier	Surface	Partner	Opponents	Score
Win	1–0	May 1992	São Paulo, Brazil	Challenger	Hard	(South Africa) Kevin Ullyett	(Mexico) Gerardo Martinez (United States) Tom Mercer	7–6, 6–4
Win	2–0	May 1992	Itu, Brazil	Challenger	Hard	(South Africa) Kevin Ullyett	(Haiti) Bertrand Madsen (United States) Tom Mercer	6–1, 6–3
Win	3–0	Nov 1992	Aachen, Germany	Challenger	Carpet	(South Africa) Christo van Rensburg	(Denmark) Michael Mortensen (Germany) Christian Saceanu	6–1, 6–3
Loss	3–1	Nov 1992	Munich, Germany	Challenger	Carpet	(South Africa) Marcos Ondruska	(Netherlands) Sander Groen (Germany) Arne Thoms	4–6, 6–7
Win	4–1	May 1993	Rome, Italy	Challenger	Clay	(South Africa) David Nainkin	(Brazil) Danilo Marcelino (Brazil) Fernando Meligeni	6–0, 6–1
Loss	4–2	Sep 1993	Singapore, Singapore	Challenger	Hard	(Netherlands) Sander Groen	(United Kingdom) Jeremy Bates (South Africa) Christo van Rensburg	3–6, 4–6
Win	5–2	Oct 1993	Brest, France	Challenger	Hard	(South Africa) Ellis Ferreira	(United States) Mike Briggs (United States) Trevor Kronemann	2–6, 7–5, 7–5
Loss	5–3	Dec 1994	Naples, United States	Challenger	Clay	(South Africa) Marcos Ondruska	(Australia) David Macpherson (United States) Trevor Kronemann	3–6, 6–7
Win	6–3	Aug 1996	Lexington, United States	Challenger	Hard	(United States) Geoff Grant	(United States) Chad Clark (Egypt) Tamer El Sawy	7–5, 6–1
Loss	6–4	Sep 1996	Aruba, Aruba	Challenger	Hard	(Canada) Sébastien Leblanc	(India) Mahesh Bhupathi (India) Leander Paes	2–6, 2–6
Loss	6–5	Aug 2000	Lexington, United States	Challenger	Hard	(South Africa) Wesley Whitehouse	(Switzerland) Lorenzo Manta (Italy) Laurence Tieleman	6–7^{(5–7)}, 6–7^{(3–7)}
Loss	6–6	Apr 2001	Paget, Bermuda	Challenger	Clay	(Japan) Thomas Shimada	(United States) Paul Goldstein (United States) Andy Roddick	6–4, 3–6, 4–6

== Performance timelines ==
Key
W	F	SF	QF	#R	RR	Q#	DNQ	A	NH

(W) winner; (F) finalist; (SF) semifinalist; (QF) quarterfinalist; (#R) rounds 4, 3, 2, 1; (RR) round-robin stage; (Q#) qualification round; (DNQ) did not qualify; (A) absent; (NH) not held; (SR) strike rate (events won / competed); (W–L) win–loss record.

=== Singles ===
Tournament	1990	1991	1992	1993	1994	1995	1996	1997	1998	1999	2000	SR	W–L	Win %
Grand Slam tournaments
Australian Open	A	A	1R	1R	4R	1R	Q3	2R	1R	A	2R	0 / 7	5–7	42%
French Open	A	A	A	Q1	1R	A	A	1R	1R	A	A	0 / 3	0–3	0%
Wimbledon	Q1	A	3R	1R	1R	A	2R	1R	1R	1R	A	0 / 7	3–7	30%
US Open	A	2R	Q1	1R	1R	Q2	1R	2R	Q3	A	A	0 / 5	2–5	29%
Win–loss	0–0	1–1	2–2	0–3	3–4	0–1	1–2	2–4	0–3	0–1	1–1	0 / 22	10–22	31%
ATP Masters Series
Indian Wells	A	A	A	2R	A	Q1	1R	A	1R	Q1	A	0 / 3	1–3	25%
Miami	A	A	2R	2R	2R	Q2	1R	2R	2R	A	A	0 / 6	5–6	45%
Canada	A	A	A	2R	1R	A	A	1R	1R	A	A	0 / 4	1–4	20%
Cincinnati	A	2R	A	A	A	A	Q2	1R	A	A	A	0 / 2	1–2	33%
Stuttgart^{1}	A	A	A	A	A	A	A	A	Q1	A	A	0 / 0	0–0	–
Win–loss	0–0	1–1	1–1	3–3	1–2	0–0	0–2	1–3	1–3	0–0	0–0	0 / 15	8–15	35%

=== Doubles ===
Tournament	1990	1991	1992	1993	1994	1995	1996	1997	1998	1999	2000	2001	SR	W–L	Win %
Grand Slam tournaments
Australian Open	A	A	A	A	1R	QF	A	2R	1R	A	2R	1R	0 / 6	5–6	45%
French Open	A	A	A	A	A	A	A	1R	2R	2R	A	1R	0 / 4	2–4	33%
Wimbledon	Q1	A	Q2	Q1	A	A	A	2R	2R	2R	1R	1R	0 / 5	3–5	38%
US Open	A	A	A	A	3R	Q1	A	1R	2R	2R	QF	2R	0 / 6	8–6	57%
Win–loss	0–0	0–0	0–0	0–0	2–2	3–1	0–0	2–4	3–4	3–3	4–3	1–4	0 / 21	18–21	46%
ATP Masters Series
Indian Wells	A	A	A	A	A	1R	A	A	A	1R	A	A	0 / 2	0–2	0%
Miami	A	A	A	A	A	2R	A	2R	2R	SF	1R	1R	0 / 6	7–6	54%
Rome	A	A	A	A	A	A	A	A	A	1R	A	A	0 / 1	0–1	0%
Hamburg	A	A	A	A	A	A	A	A	A	1R	A	A	0 / 1	0–1	0%
Canada	A	A	A	A	1R	A	A	1R	1R	A	A	1R	0 / 4	0–4	0%
Cincinnati	A	2R	A	A	A	A	A	A	A	A	A	A	0 / 1	1–1	50%
Win–loss	0–0	1–1	0–0	0–0	0–1	1–2	0–0	1–2	1–2	4–4	0–1	0–2	0 / 15	8–15	35%
