= 1999 US Open – Women's singles qualifying =

Women's singles qualifying
- 1999 US Open

Events
Singles	men	women		boys	girls
Doubles	men	women	mixed	boys	girls
WC Singles	men	women	quad
WC Doubles	men	women	quad
Legends	men	women	mixed

Qualification
Singles	men	women
Doubles	men	women
- US Open

The 1999 US Open – Women's singles qualifying was a series of tennis matches that took place from August 23 to 26, 1999 to determine the sixteen qualifiers into the main draw of the women's singles tournament, and, if necessary, the lucky losers.

== Seeds ==
1. (Austria) Patricia Wartusch (first round)
2. (Czech Republic) Adriana Gerši (qualified)
3. (Russia) Eugenia Kulikovskaya (first round)
4. (Hungary) Anna-Maria Földényi (first round)
5. (Russia) Anastasia Myskina (qualified)
6. (Japan) Miho Saeki (qualifying competition)
7. (Sweden) Åsa Carlsson (qualified)
8. (Slovakia) Katarína Studeníková (first round)
9. (Italy) Adriana Serra Zanetti (first round)
10. (Romania) Cătălina Cristea (qualified)
11. (United States) Jolene Watanabe (qualifying competition)
12. (Chinese Taipei) Janet Lee (qualified)
13. (Venezuela) María-Alejandra Vento (qualified)
14. (Italy) Tathiana Garbin (first round)
15. (Germany) Anca Barna (qualified)
16. (Slovenia) Tina Pisnik (qualified)
17. (Romania) Raluca Sandu (second round)
18. (Hungary) Petra Mandula (first round)
19. (Germany) Miriam Schnitzer (second round)
20. (Australia) Annabel Ellwood (first round)
21. (Canada) Sonya Jeyaseelan (first round)
22. (Russia) Nadia Petrova (second round)
23. (Switzerland) Miroslava Vavrinec (second round)
24. (Italy) Francesca Lubiani (second round)
25. (Spain) Mariam Ramon Climent (second round)
26. (United Kingdom) Louise Latimer (second round)
27. (Russia) Alina Jidkova (first round)
28. (Croatia) Jelena Kostanić (qualified)
29. (South Africa) Joannette Kruger (first round)
30. (Spain) Eva Bes-Ostariz (second round)
31. (Russia) Elena Makarova (qualifying competition)
32. (Germany) Julia Abe (qualifying competition)

== Qualifiers ==
1. (United States) Tracy Singian
2. (Chinese Taipei) Janet Lee
3. (Venezuela) María-Alejandra Vento
4. (Russia) Anastasia Myskina
5. (Slovenia) Tina Križan
6. (Slovenia) Tina Pisnik
7. (Romania) Cătălina Cristea
8. (Sweden) Åsa Carlsson
9. (Germany) Jana Kandarr
10. (Croatia) Jelena Kostanić
11. (Australia) Lisa McShea
12. (Germany) Sandra Klösel
13. (Poland) Magdalena Grzybowska
14. (Belarus) Tatiana Poutchek
15. (Germany) Anca Barna
16. (Czech Republic) Adriana Gerši

== Qualifying draw ==
Key

- Q = Qualifier
- WC = Wild card
- LL = Lucky loser
- Alt = Alternate
- ITF = ITF entry
- PR = Protected ranking
- SR = Special ranking
- SE = Special exempt
- JE = Junior exempt
- JR = Junior Accelerator Programme entrant
- CO = College Accelerator Programme entrant
- NG = Next Gen Accelerator Program entrant
- w/o = Walkover
- r = Retired
- d = Defaulted

=== First qualifier ===
First round
1	(Austria) Patricia Wartusch	6	6^{7}	6^{7}
(United States) Tracy Singian	2	7^{9}	7^{9}
(Australia) Trudi Musgrave	6	6^{5}	6
(Romania) Andreea Vanc	4	7^{7}	3
(Argentina) Luciana Masante	4	3
(Slovakia) Martina Suchá	6	6
(Japan) Shinobu Asagoe	0	1
19	(Germany) Miriam Schnitzer	6	6

Second round
(United States) Tracy Singian	6	6
(Australia) Trudi Musgrave	4	4
(Slovakia) Martina Suchá	6	6
19	(Germany) Miriam Schnitzer	4	3

Qualifying competition
(United States) Tracy Singian	7	6
(Slovakia) Martina Suchá	5	4

=== Second qualifier ===
First round
22	(Russia) Nadia Petrova	6	2	6
(Romania) Magda Mihalache	4	6	3
(Austria) Evelyn Fauth	4	6	7
(Italy) Germana Di Natale	6	4	5
WC	(United States) Lindsay Lee	3	6	3
(Israel) Hila Rosen	6	2	6
(United States) Julie Scott	2	2
12	(Chinese Taipei) Janet Lee	6	6

Second round
22	(Russia) Nadia Petrova	3	1
(Austria) Evelyn Fauth	6	6
(Israel) Hila Rosen	2	6^{5}
12	(Chinese Taipei) Janet Lee	6	7^{7}

Qualifying competition
(Austria) Evelyn Fauth	7^{7}	4	1
12	(Chinese Taipei) Janet Lee	6^{5}	6	6

=== Third qualifier ===
First round
13	(Venezuela) Maria-Alejandra Vento	6	6
(South Africa) Esmé de Villiers	2	4
(Austria) Marion Maruska	7^{7}	6^{2}	0^{r}
(Venezuela) Milagros Sequera	6^{4}	7^{7}	1
(France) Lea Ghirardi	6	6
(Japan) Rika Hiraki	2	0
(Kazakhstan) Irina Selyutina	2	2
32	(Germany) Julia Abe	6	6

Second round
13	(Venezuela) Maria-Alejandra Vento	6	6
(Venezuela) Milagros Sequera	2	0
(France) Lea Ghirardi	3	5
32	(Germany) Julia Abe	6	7

Qualifying competition
13	(Venezuela) Maria-Alejandra Vento	4	6	7^{7}
32	(Germany) Julia Abe	6	2	6^{2}

=== Fourth qualifier ===
First round
23	(Switzerland) Miroslava Vavrinec	6	6
(Bulgaria) Svetlana Krivencheva	2	3
(Spain) Rosa María Andrés Rodríguez	4	6	2
(France) Alexandra Fusai	6	4	6
(Germany) Adriana Barna	4	6	6
(United Kingdom) Joanne Ward	6	1	3
(Australia) Cindy Watson	2	2
5	(Russia) Anastasia Myskina	6	6

Second round
23	(Switzerland) Miroslava Vavrinec	6^{7}	4
(France) Alexandra Fusai	7^{9}	6
(Germany) Adriana Barna	2	4
5	(Russia) Anastasia Myskina	6	6

Qualifying competition
(France) Alexandra Fusai	6^{4}	2
5	(Russia) Anastasia Myskina	7^{7}	6

=== Fifth qualifier ===
First round
4	(Hungary) Anna-Maria Foldenyi	1	1
(Australia) Amanda Grahame	6	6
WC	(United States) Erica Adams	2	4
(Slovenia) Tina Križan	6	6
(United Kingdom) Karen Cross	4	6^{6}
(Denmark) Eva Dyrberg	6	7^{8}
(Argentina) María Fernanda Landa	1^{r}
25	(Spain) Mariam Ramon Climent	5

Second round
(Australia) Amanda Grahame	6	5	0
(Slovenia) Tina Križan	3	7	6
(Denmark) Eva Dyrberg	6	5	6
25	(Spain) Mariam Ramon Climent	4	7	2

Qualifying competition
(Slovenia) Tina Križan	6	6
(Denmark) Eva Dyrberg	1	2

=== Sixth qualifier ===
First round
18	(Hungary) Petra Mandula	7^{7}	0	5
(Argentina) Florencia Labat	6^{2}	6	7
(United States) Holly Parkinson	6	4	6
(Spain) Alicia Ortuño	3	6	4
(Belgium) Patty Van Acker	6	7^{8}
(Italy) Giulia Casoni	3	6^{6}
(Spain) Ainhoa Goñi Blanco	1	0
16	(Slovenia) Tina Pisnik	6	6

Second round
(Argentina) Florencia Labat	4	6	6
(United States) Holly Parkinson	6	3	0
(Belgium) Patty Van Acker	3	1
16	(Slovenia) Tina Pisnik	6	6

Qualifying competition
(Argentina) Florencia Labat	3	6	2
16	(Slovenia) Tina Pisnik	6	2	6

=== Seventh qualifier ===
First round
10	(Romania) Cătălina Cristea	6	7
(Czech Republic) Renata Kučerová	2	5
(Hungary) Nóra Köves	6^{4}	0
(France) Sophie Georges	7^{7}	6
(Czech Republic) Lenka Cenková	6^{3}	6	0
(South Africa) Surina de Beer	7^{7}	4	6
(United Kingdom) Lorna Woodroffe	2	4
30	(Spain) Eva Bes	6	6

Second round
10	(Romania) Cătălina Cristea	6	6
(France) Sophie Georges	3	0
(South Africa) Surina de Beer	6	6
30	(Spain) Eva Bes	4	2

Qualifying competition
10	(Romania) Cătălina Cristea	6	6
(South Africa) Surina de Beer	4	3

=== Eighth qualifier ===
First round
27	(Russia) Alina Jidkova	4	6^{4}
(United States) Nicole Arendt	6	7^{7}
WC	(United States) Julie Ditty	6^{4}	5
(Italy) Maria Paola Zavagli	7^{7}	7
(South Korea) Park Sung-hee	6	4	1
(Slovenia) Barbara Mulej	2	6	6
(South Africa) Jessica Steck	7^{7}	3	2
7	(Sweden) Åsa Carlsson	6^{4}	6	6

Second round
(United States) Nicole Arendt	6	4	6
(Italy) Maria Paola Zavagli	3	6	3
(Slovenia) Barbara Mulej	6^{5}	1
7	(Sweden) Åsa Carlsson	7^{7}	6

Qualifying competition
(United States) Nicole Arendt	6^{4}	3
7	(Sweden) Åsa Carlsson	7^{7}	6

=== Ninth qualifier ===
First round
8	(Slovakia) Katarína Studeníková	2	6	4
(Japan) Yuka Yoshida	6	1	6
(France) Stéphanie Foretz	6	6
(Argentina) Maria Jose Gaidano	2	1
(Germany) Jana Kandarr	6	6
(Germany) Angelika Rösch	4	4
(Italy) Alice Canepa	2	2
24	(Italy) Francesca Lubiani	6	6

Second round
(Japan) Yuka Yoshida	6	6
(France) Stéphanie Foretz	1	3
(Germany) Jana Kandarr	6	7^{7}
24	(Italy) Francesca Lubiani	2	6^{4}

Qualifying competition
(Japan) Yuka Yoshida	6	3	6^{2}
(Germany) Jana Kandarr	2	6	7^{7}

=== Tenth qualifier ===
First round
28	(Croatia) Jelena Kostanić	3	6	6
(United States) Linda Wild	6	3	3
(Slovakia) Radka Zrubáková	3	1
(Germany) Angelika Bachmann	6	6
(Hungary) Katalin Marosi	3	7^{7}	3
(France) Laurence Andretto	6	6^{0}	0^{r}
(India) Nirupama Vaidyanathan	7^{7}	7^{7}
14	(Italy) Tathiana Garbin	6^{2}	6^{1}

Second round
28	(Croatia) Jelena Kostanić	6	3	6
(Germany) Angelika Bachmann	3	6	1
(Hungary) Katalin Marosi	1	1
(India) Nirupama Vaidyanathan	6	6

Qualifying competition
28	(Croatia) Jelena Kostanić	6	6
(India) Nirupama Vaidyanathan	1	1

=== Eleventh qualifier ===
First round
9	(Italy) Adriana Serra Zanetti	4	5
(Australia) Lisa McShea	6	7
(Czech Republic) Alena Vašková	6	6
(Bulgaria) Desislava Topalova	2	4
(Brazil) Vanessa Menga	3	2
(Spain) Gisela Riera	6	6
(United States) Marissa Irvin	4	6	4
26	(United Kingdom) Louise Latimer	6	4	6

Second round
(Australia) Lisa McShea	6	6
(Czech Republic) Alena Vašková	1	0
(Spain) Gisela Riera	6	5	6
26	(United Kingdom) Louise Latimer	3	7	2

Qualifying competition
(Australia) Lisa McShea	4	6	6
(Spain) Gisela Riera	6	2	3

=== Twelfth qualifier ===
First round
21	(Canada) Sonya Jeyaseelan	7	3	5
(Germany) Sandra Klösel	5	6	7
(South Africa) Liezel Horn	3	0
(Canada) Vanessa Webb	6	6
(United Kingdom) Lucie Ahl	3	6	1
(Poland) Aleksandra Olsza	6	1	6
(Italy) Antonella Serra Zanetti	6	3	6
3	(Russia) Eugenia Kulikovskaya	0	6	3

Second round
(Germany) Sandra Klösel	6	6
(Canada) Vanessa Webb	1	2
(Poland) Aleksandra Olsza	3	6	6
(Italy) Antonella Serra Zanetti	6	4	4

Qualifying competition
(Germany) Sandra Klösel	7^{7}	6
(Poland) Aleksandra Olsza	6^{3}	3

=== Thirteenth qualifier ===
First round
6	(Japan) Miho Saeki	7^{7}	3	7
WC	(United States) Ansley Cargill	6^{0}	6	5
(Spain) Conchita Martínez Granados	3	2
(Japan) Haruka Inoue	6	6
(Australia) Rachel McQuillan	6	6
WC	(United States) Katie Schlukebir	1	1
(Poland) Magdalena Grzybowska	3	6	6
29	(South Africa) Joannette Kruger	6	0	3

Second round
6	(Japan) Miho Saeki	6	6
(Japan) Haruka Inoue	4	3
(Australia) Rachel McQuillan	2	6	3
(Poland) Magdalena Grzybowska	6	3	6

Qualifying competition
6	(Japan) Miho Saeki	1	2
(Poland) Magdalena Grzybowska	6	6

=== Fourteenth qualifier ===
First round
17	(Romania) Raluca Sandu	7	6
(United States) Karin Miller	5	1
(Belarus) Tatiana Poutchek	4	6	6
(Morocco) Bahia Mouhtassine	6	3	1
(China) Yi Jing-qian	6	6
WC	(United States) Jean Okada	4	4
(Australia) Catherine Barclay	6^{6}	2
11	(United States) Jolene Watanabe	7^{8}	6

Second round
17	(Romania) Raluca Sandu	5	2
(Belarus) Tatiana Poutchek	7	6
(China) Yi Jing-qian	7	4	4
11	(United States) Jolene Watanabe	5	6	6

Qualifying competition
(Belarus) Tatiana Poutchek	6	4	7
11	(United States) Jolene Watanabe	4	6	5

=== Fifteenth qualifier ===
First round
15	(Germany) Anca Barna	6	6
WC	(United States) Brandis Braverman	4	3
(Paraguay) Larissa Schaerer	0	6	6
(United States) Jacqueline Trail	6	1	2
(Japan) Nana Miyagi	6	7
(Czech Republic) Eva Martincová	4	5
(United States) Sandra Cacic	6	7
20	(Australia) Annabel Ellwood	3	5

Second round
15	(Germany) Anca Barna	6	6
(Paraguay) Larissa Schaerer	1	2
(Japan) Nana Miyagi	1	6	3
(United States) Sandra Cacic	6	4	6

Qualifying competition
15	(Germany) Anca Barna	6	6
(United States) Sandra Cacic	1	3

=== Sixteenth qualifier ===
First round
31	(Russia) Elena Makarova	6	5	6
(Czech Republic) Radka Pelikánová	3	7	4
(Australia) Kerry-Anne Guse	2	6	6^{7}
(Slovenia) Petra Rampre	6	3	7^{9}
(Italy) Francesca Schiavone	2	1
(Canada) Renata Kolbovic	6	6
(United Kingdom) Julie Pullin	6	3	4
2	(Czech Republic) Adriana Gerši	2	6	6

Second round
31	(Russia) Elena Makarova	6	6
(Slovenia) Petra Rampre	4	4
(Canada) Renata Kolbovic	4	3
2	(Czech Republic) Adriana Gerši	6	6

Qualifying competition
31	(Russia) Elena Makarova	3	2
2	(Czech Republic) Adriana Gerši	6	6
