= 1999 US Open – Boys' doubles =

Boys' doubles
- 1999 US Open

Final
- Champions: (France) Julien Benneteau (France) Nicolas Mahut
- Runners-up: (United States) Tres Davis (United States) Alberto Francis
- Score: 6–4, 3–6, 6–1

Events
Singles	men	women		boys	girls
Doubles	men	women	mixed	boys	girls
WC Singles	men	women	quad
WC Doubles	men	women	quad
Legends	men	women	mixed
- US Open

K. J. Hippensteel and David Martin were the defending champions, but only Martin competed this year with his brother Timothy. They were eliminated in the second round by Mario Ančić and Steve Berke.

Frenchmen Julien Benneteau and Nicolas Mahut won the title, defeating home team Tres Davis and Alberto Francis in the final, 6–4, 3–6, 6–1.

== Seeds ==
1. (France) Julien Benneteau / (France) Nicolas Mahut (champions)
2. (Bulgaria) Todor Enev / (Finland) Jarkko Nieminen (first round)
3. (Mexico) Daniel Langre / (Netherlands Antilles) Jean-Julien Rojer (second round)
4. (United States) Tres Davis / (United States) Alberto Francis (final)
5. (United States) Bo Hodge / (United States) Scott Lipsky (first round)
6. (Georgia (country)) Irakli Labadze / (Denmark) Kristian Pless (second round)
7. (United States) David Martin / (United States) Timothy Martin (second round)
8. (United States) Levar Harper-Griffith / (United States) Andy Roddick (semifinals)

== Draw ==
Key

- Q = Qualifier
- WC = Wild card
- LL = Lucky loser
- Alt = Alternate
- ITF = ITF entry
- PR = Protected ranking
- SR = Special ranking
- SE = Special exempt
- JE = Junior exempt
- JR = Junior Accelerator Programme entrant
- CO = College Accelerator Programme entrant
- NG = Next Gen Accelerator Program entrant
- w/o = Walkover
- r = Retired
- d = Defaulted

=== Finals ===
Semifinals
1	(France) Julien Benneteau (France) Nicolas Mahut	6	6	6
8	(United States) Levar Harper-Griffith (United States) Andy Roddick	4	7	4
4	(United States) Tres Davis (United States) Alberto Francis	6	6
(Croatia) Mario Ančić (United States) Steve Berke	4	1

Final
1	(France) Julien Benneteau (France) Nicolas Mahut	6	3	6
4	(United States) Tres Davis (United States) Alberto Francis	4	6	1

=== Top half ===
First round
1	(France) Julien Benneteau (France) Nicolas Mahut	6	6	6
(United States) Mardy Fish (South Africa) Brandon Weir-Smith	7	2	2
(United States) Yorke Allen (United States) Philip Stolt	1	4
(France) Éric Prodon (Germany) Christian-Michael Straka	6	6
(Egypt) Mohamed Mamoun (South Africa) Peter-John Nomdo	5	6	2
(France) Julien Cassaigne (Russia) Dmitry Vlasov	7	3	6
(United States) Justin Diao Natale (New Zealand) Lee Radovanovich	3	7	6
5	(United States) Bo Hodge (United States) Scott Lipsky	6	5	3
3	(Mexico) Daniel Langre (Netherlands Antilles) Jean-Julien Rojer	6	6
(Sweden) Jonas Fröberg (Sweden) Filip Prpic	4	1
(United States) Alex Bogomolov Jr. (United States) John-Paul Fruttero	6	5	6
(United Kingdom) Lee Childs (United Kingdom) Mark Hilton	0	7	7
(Morocco) Hicham Fathi El Idrissi (Venezuela) Jhonnatan Medina-Álvarez	6	7
(Germany) Maximillian Abel (Germany) Denis Gremelmayr	4	6
(Republic of Ireland) Stephen Nugent (Chile) Julio Peralta	3	1
8	(United States) Levar Harper-Griffith (United States) Andy Roddick	6	6

Second round
1	(France) J Benneteau (France) N Mahut	6	6
(France) É Prodon (Germany) C-M Straka	3	4
(France) J Cassaigne (Russia) D Vlasov	6	6
(United States) J Diao Natale (New Zealand) L Radovanovich	4	3
3	(Mexico) D Langre (Netherlands Antilles) J-J Rojer	3	6	2
(United Kingdom) L Childs (United Kingdom) M Hilton	6	2	6
(Morocco) H Fathi El Idrissi (Venezuela) J Medina-Álvarez	6	1	5
8	(United States) L Harper-Griffith (United States) A Roddick	3	6	7

Quarterfinals
1	(France) J Benneteau (France) N Mahut	6	1	6
(France) J Cassaigne (Russia) D Vlasov	4	6	4
(United Kingdom) L Childs (United Kingdom) M Hilton	6	6	2
8	(United States) L Harper-Griffith (United States) A Roddick	7	1	6

Semifinals
1	(France) J Benneteau (France) N Mahut	6	6	6
8	(United States) L Harper-Griffith (United States) A Roddick	4	7	4

=== Bottom half ===
First round
6	(Georgia (country)) Irakli Labadze (Denmark) Kristian Pless	4	7	6
(Croatia) Roko Karanušić (Federal Republic of Yugoslavia) Boris Pašanski	6	6	4
(Germany) Dirk Britzen (Germany) Philipp Hammer	6	6
(Israel) Harel Srugo (Israel) Tomer Suissa	1	3
(United States) Ytai Abougzir (United States) Robby Ginepri	2	2
(Belgium) Renaud Thys (Thailand) Danai Udomchoke	6	6
(Chile) Phillip Harboe (Chinese Taipei) Wang Yeu-tzuoo	6	2
4	(United States) Tres Davis (United States) Alberto Francis	7	6
7	(United States) David Martin (United States) Timothy Martin	7	6
(Argentina) José Acasuso (Argentina) Guillermo Coria	5	3
(Croatia) Mario Ančić (United States) Steve Berke	4	6	6
(United States) Lesley Joseph (United States) Ryan Newport	6	4	4
(Mexico) Jacobo Hernández (Benin) Arnaud Segodo	6	7
(Japan) Hayato Furukawa (Hong Kong) Wong Wing-luen	4	6
(Belarus) Vitali Chvets (Poland) Radosław Nijaki	6	5	6
2	(Bulgaria) Todor Enev (Finland) Jarkko Nieminen	2	7	4

Second round
6	(Georgia (country)) I Labadze (Denmark) K Pless	6	6	6
(Germany) D Britzen (Germany) P Hammer	7	4	7
(Belgium) R Thys (Thailand) D Udomchoke	6	6	5
4	(United States) T Davis (United States) A Francis	2	7	7
7	(United States) D Martin (United States) T Martin	2	5
(Croatia) M Ančić (United States) S Berke	6	7
(Mexico) J Hernández (Benin) A Segodo	7	4	5
(Belarus) V Chvets (Poland) R Nijaki	6	6	7

Quarterfinals
(Germany) D Britzen (Germany) P Hammer	4	6	6
4	(United States) T Davis (United States) A Francis	6	4	7
(Croatia) M Ančić (United States) S Berke	6	6	6
(Belarus) V Chvets (Poland) R Nijaki	7	2	1

Semifinals
4	(United States) T Davis (United States) A Francis	6	6
(Croatia) M Ančić (United States) S Berke	4	1
