= 2002 Australian Open – Women's singles qualifying =

Women's singles qualifying
- 2002 Australian Open

Events
Singles	men	women		boys	girls
Doubles	men	women	mixed	boys	girls
WC Singles	men	women	quad
WC Doubles	men	women	quad
Legends	men	women	mixed

Qualification
Singles	men	women
- Australian Open

This article displays the qualifying draw for women's singles at the 2002 Australian Open.

== Seeds ==
1. (Indonesia) Angelique Widjaja (first round)
2. (Bulgaria) Lubomira Bacheva (first round)
3. (Switzerland) Miroslava Vavrinec (first round)
4. (Germany) Gréta Arn (qualified)
5. (Czech Republic) Sandra Kleinová (first round)
6. (Argentina) María Emilia Salerni (qualified)
7. (Slovakia) Karina Habšudová (first round)
8. (Croatia) Maja Palaveršić (second round)
9. (France) Stéphanie Foretz (first round)
10. (New Zealand) Pavlina Nola (qualifying competition, lucky loser)
11. (Japan) Rika Fujiwara (second round)
12. (Argentina) Clarisa Fernández (qualified)
13. (Croatia) Jelena Kostanić (qualified)
14. (Czech Republic) Klára Koukalová (second round)
15. (United States) Mashona Washington (first round)
16. (Russia) Evgenia Kulikovskaya (first round)
17. (Czech Republic) Lenka Němečková (first round)
18. (Madagascar) Dally Randriantefy (second round)
19. (Denmark) Eva Dyrberg (qualified)
20. (Ukraine) Tatiana Perebiynis (qualifying competition)
21. (Canada) Marie-Ève Pelletier (qualifying competition)
22. (United States) Sarah Taylor (first round)
23. (Netherlands) Kristie Boogert (qualified)
24. (France) Alexandra Fusai (first round)

== Qualifiers ==
1. (Croatia) Jelena Kostanić
2. (Denmark) Eva Dyrberg
3. (Russia) Svetlana Kuznetsova
4. (Germany) Gréta Arn
5. (Netherlands) Kristie Boogert
6. (Argentina) María Emilia Salerni
7. (Italy) Gloria Pizzichini
8. (Morocco) Bahia Mouhtassine
9. (Italy) Antonella Serra Zanetti
10. (United States) Ansley Cargill
11. (Ukraine) Elena Tatarkova
12. (Argentina) Clarisa Fernández

== Lucky losers ==
1. (New Zealand) Pavlina Nola

== Draw ==
=== First qualifier ===
First round
1	(Indonesia) Angelique Widjaja	1	2
WC	(Australia) Jenny Belobrajdic	6	6
(Czech Republic) Renata Voráčová	6	7^{9}
(Germany) Nina Dübbers	4	6^{7}
(Russia) Galina Fokina	1	3
(South Korea) Kim Eun-ha	6	6
(Mexico) Jessica Fernández	3	3
13	(Croatia) Jelena Kostanić	6	6

Second round
WC	(Australia) Jenny Belobrajdic	4	6	5
(Czech Republic) Renata Voráčová	6	1	7
(South Korea) Kim Eun-ha	4	7^{7}	1
13	(Croatia) Jelena Kostanić	6	6^{3}	6

Qualifying competition
(Czech Republic) Renata Voráčová	4	5
13	(Croatia) Jelena Kostanić	6	7

=== Second qualifier ===
First round
2	(Bulgaria) Lubomira Bacheva	2	5
(United States) Jane Chi	6	7
(Czech Republic) Olga Blahotová	2	2
(Australia) Mireille Dittmann	6	6
(Bulgaria) Maria Geznenge	6	2	1
WC	(Australia) Melissa Dowse	3	6	6
(Germany) Adriana Barna	5	0
19	(Denmark) Eva Dyrberg	7	6

Second round
(United States) Jane Chi	6	6
(Australia) Mireille Dittmann	2	3
WC	(Australia) Melissa Dowse	0	1
19	(Denmark) Eva Dyrberg	6	6

Qualifying competition
(United States) Jane Chi	3	4
19	(Denmark) Eva Dyrberg	6	6

=== Third qualifier ===
First round
3	(Switzerland) Miroslava Vavrinec	4	6	2
(Estonia) Maret Ani	6	4	6
(Hungary) Katalin Marosi-Aracama	6	6
(Japan) Nana Miyagi	1	2
WC	(Russia) Svetlana Kuznetsova	6	6
(Slovakia) Gabriela Voleková	2	3
WC	(Australia) Beti Sekulovski	1	1
18	(Madagascar) Dally Randriantefy	6	6

Second round
(Estonia) Maret Ani	3	3
(Hungary) Katalin Marosi-Aracama	6	6
WC	(Russia) Svetlana Kuznetsova	6	6
18	(Madagascar) Dally Randriantefy	2	2

Qualifying competition
(Hungary) Katalin Marosi-Aracama	1	6	3
WC	(Russia) Svetlana Kuznetsova	6	1	6

=== Fourth qualifier ===
First round
4	(Germany) Gréta Arn	6	6
(United Kingdom) Julie Pullin	1	0
(Bulgaria) Svetlana Krivencheva	6	7
(Austria) Evelyn Fauth	3	5
(Argentina) Vanesa Krauth	0	4
(Germany) Angelika Rösch	6	6
(Slovakia) Lenka Dlhopolcová	6	6
22	(United States) Sarah Taylor	3	2

Second round
4	(Germany) Gréta Arn	6	6
(Bulgaria) Svetlana Krivencheva	2	3
(Germany) Angelika Rösch	6	6
(Slovakia) Lenka Dlhopolcová	3	1

Qualifying competition
4	(Germany) Gréta Arn	7	7^{7}
(Germany) Angelika Rösch	5	6^{5}

=== Fifth qualifier ===
First round
5	(Czech Republic) Sandra Kleinová	1	1
(United Kingdom) Lucie Ahl	6	6
(United Kingdom) Rachel Viollet	4	4
(France) Laurence Andretto	6	6
WC	(Australia) Trudi Musgrave	2	6	4
(Czech Republic) Eva Krejčová	6	3	6
(Canada) Maureen Drake	4	3
23	(Netherlands) Kristie Boogert	6	6

Second round
(United Kingdom) Lucie Ahl	7^{8}	7^{7}
(France) Laurence Andretto	6^{6}	6^{4}
(Czech Republic) Eva Krejčová	1	4
23	(Netherlands) Kristie Boogert	6	6

Qualifying competition
(United Kingdom) Lucie Ahl	2	6^{3}
23	(Netherlands) Kristie Boogert	6	7^{7}

=== Sixth qualifier ===
First round
6	(Argentina) María Emilia Salerni	6	6
(United States) Erika deLone	2	1
(Hungary) Kira Nagy	6	6
(Italy) Valentina Sassi	4	4
WC	(Australia) Jaslyn Hewitt	4	0
(United States) Allison Bradshaw	6	6
(Netherlands) Anousjka van Exel	6	5	0
21	(Canada) Marie-Ève Pelletier	1	7	6

Second round
6	(Argentina) María Emilia Salerni	6	6
(Hungary) Kira Nagy	3	2
(United States) Allison Bradshaw	6	2	5
21	(Canada) Marie-Ève Pelletier	1	6	7

Qualifying competition
6	(Argentina) María Emilia Salerni	6^{5}	7^{7}	6
21	(Canada) Marie-Ève Pelletier	7^{7}	6^{2}	3

=== Seventh qualifier ===
First round
7	(Slovakia) Karina Habšudová	2	3
(Belarus) Olga Barabanschikova	6	6
(Federal Republic of Yugoslavia) Dragana Zarić	6	2	6
(Austria) Patricia Wartusch	1	6	8
(Germany) Sabine Klaschka	6	6
WC	(Australia) Kristen van Elden	0	0
(Italy) Gloria Pizzichini	6	6
17	(Czech Republic) Lenka Němečková	4	4

Second round
(Belarus) Olga Barabanschikova	4	6	3
(Austria) Patricia Wartusch	6	4	6
(Germany) Sabine Klaschka	6	1	1
(Italy) Gloria Pizzichini	3	6	6

Qualifying competition
(Austria) Patricia Wartusch	3	1
(Italy) Gloria Pizzichini	6	6

=== Eighth qualifier ===
First round
8	(Croatia) Maja Palaveršić	6	6^{7}	6
(Romania) Andreea Vanc	4	7^{9}	4
(Russia) Anastasia Rodionova	2	2
(Japan) Akiko Morigami	6	6
(Morocco) Bahia Mouhtassine	3	6	6
(Bulgaria) Desislava Topalova	6	2	3
(France) Anne-Laure Heitz	4	2
14	(Czech Republic) Klára Koukalová	6	6

Second round
8	(Croatia) Maja Palaveršić	6	5	1
(Japan) Akiko Morigami	3	7	6
(Morocco) Bahia Mouhtassine	6	2	6
14	(Czech Republic) Klára Koukalová	3	6	1

Qualifying competition
(Japan) Akiko Morigami	5	4
(Morocco) Bahia Mouhtassine	7	6

=== Ninth qualifier ===
First round
9	(France) Stéphanie Foretz	4	5
(Republic of Ireland) Kelly Liggan	6	7
(Czech Republic) Eva Martincová	2	7	6
(Italy) Roberta Vinci	6	5	1
(Chinese Taipei) Hsieh Su-wei	6	6
(Brazil) Joana Cortez	4	2
(Italy) Antonella Serra Zanetti	3	6	7
16	(Russia) Evgenia Kulikovskaya	6	3	5

Second round
(Republic of Ireland) Kelly Liggan	2	0
(Czech Republic) Eva Martincová	6	6
(Chinese Taipei) Hsieh Su-wei	4	5
(Italy) Antonella Serra Zanetti	6	7

Qualifying competition
(Czech Republic) Eva Martincová	2	5
(Italy) Antonella Serra Zanetti	6	7

=== Tenth qualifier ===
First round
10	(New Zealand) Pavlina Nola	6	6
(Belgium) Els Callens	4	1
(Czech Republic) Iveta Benešová	6^{4}	6	6
(Czech Republic) Zuzana Ondrášková	7^{7}	3	4
(Slovakia) Eva Fislová	6	7
(Australia) Annabel Ellwood	2	5
(United States) Ansley Cargill	6^{5}	7^{7}	6
24	(France) Alexandra Fusai	7^{7}	6^{2}	3

Second round
10	(New Zealand) Pavlina Nola	0	6	8
(Czech Republic) Iveta Benešová	6	1	6
(Slovakia) Eva Fislová	4	6	4
(United States) Ansley Cargill	6	2	6

Qualifying competition
10	(New Zealand) Pavlina Nola	3	6	4
(United States) Ansley Cargill	6	4	6

=== Eleventh qualifier ===
First round
11	(Japan) Rika Fujiwara	6	6
WC	(Australia) Adriana Szili	4	4
(Belarus) Nadejda Ostrovskaya	3	2
(Ukraine) Elena Tatarkova	6	6
(Federal Republic of Yugoslavia) Sandra Načuk	0	3
(South Africa) Liezel Huber	6	6
(Italy) Nathalie Viérin	6	6
15	(United States) Mashona Washington	2	1

Second round
11	(Japan) Rika Fujiwara	3	2
(Ukraine) Elena Tatarkova	6	6
(South Africa) Liezel Huber	6	4	6
(Italy) Nathalie Viérin	1	6	0

Qualifying competition
(Ukraine) Elena Tatarkova	7^{7}	4	6
(South Africa) Liezel Huber	6^{4}	6	4

=== Twelfth qualifier ===
First round
12	(Argentina) Clarisa Fernández	6	5	6
(Germany) Angelika Bachmann	4	7	2
(Japan) Miho Saeki	7	6
(Argentina) Gisela Dulko	5	1
(Estonia) Kaia Kanepi	4	6	7
(France) Camille Pin	6	2	5
(Slovakia) Ľubomíra Kurhajcová	1	6^{4}
20	(Ukraine) Tatiana Perebiynis	6	7^{7}

Second round
12	(Argentina) Clarisa Fernández	6	7^{7}
(Japan) Miho Saeki	4	6^{2}
(Estonia) Kaia Kanepi	4	6^{6}
20	(Ukraine) Tatiana Perebiynis	6	7^{8}

Qualifying competition
12	(Argentina) Clarisa Fernández	6	7
20	(Ukraine) Tatiana Perebiynis	2	5
