= 1999 US Open – Girls' doubles =

Girls' doubles
- 1999 US Open

Final
- Champions: (Czech Republic) Dája Bedáňová (Uzbekistan) Iroda Tulyaganova
- Runners-up: (Russia) Galina Fokina (Russia) Lina Krasnoroutskaya
- Score: 6–3, 6–4

Events
Singles	men	women		boys	girls
Doubles	men	women	mixed	boys	girls
WC Singles	men	women	quad
WC Doubles	men	women	quad
Legends	men	women	mixed
- US Open

Kim Clijsters and Eva Dyrberg were the defending champions, but they did not compete in the Junior's this year.

First seeds Dája Bedáňová and Iroda Tulyaganova won in the final, 6–3, 6–4, against unseeded Russians Galina Fokina and Lina Krasnoroutskaya.

== Seeds ==
1. (Czech Republic) Dája Bedáňová / (Uzbekistan) Iroda Tulyaganova (champions)
2. (Slovakia) Katarína Bašternáková / (Slovakia) Stanislava Hrozenská (semifinals)
3. (Greece) Eleni Daniilidou / (France) Virginie Razzano (semifinals)
4. (United States) Ansley Cargill / (United States) Laura Granville (quarterfinals, withdrew)
5. (Switzerland) Laura Bao / (United Kingdom) Hannah Collin (first round)
6. (Czech Republic) Eva Birnerová / (South Africa) Aniela Mojzis (quarterfinals)
7. (Slovakia) Lenka Dlhopolcová / (Slovakia) Ľubomíra Kurhajcová (second round)
8. (Netherlands) Michelle Gerards / (South Africa) Natalie Grandin (second round)

== Draw ==
Key

- Q = Qualifier
- WC = Wild card
- LL = Lucky loser
- Alt = Alternate
- ITF = ITF entry
- PR = Protected ranking
- SR = Special ranking
- SE = Special exempt
- JE = Junior exempt
- JR = Junior Accelerator Programme entrant
- CO = College Accelerator Programme entrant
- NG = Next Gen Accelerator Program entrant
- w/o = Walkover
- r = Retired
- d = Defaulted

=== Finals ===
Semifinals
1	(Czech Republic) Dája Bedáňová (Uzbekistan) Iroda Tulyaganova	6	7
3	(Greece) Eleni Daniilidou (France) Virginie Razzano	1	6
(Russia) Galina Fokina (Russia) Lina Krasnoroutskaya	7	3	6
2	(Slovakia) Katarína Bašternáková (Slovakia) Stanislava Hrozenská	5	6	2

Final
1	(Czech Republic) Dája Bedáňová (Uzbekistan) Iroda Tulyaganova	6	6
(Russia) Galina Fokina (Russia) Lina Krasnoroutskaya	3	4

=== Top half ===
First round
1	(Czech Republic) D Bedáňová (Uzbekistan) I Tulyaganova	6	7
(Hungary) K Berecz (Hungary) M Czink	1	5
(United States) M Bradley (United States) D Schwartz	6	6
(United States) E Burdette (United States) J Langer	2	2
(United States) A Cohen (United States) M Middleton	5	1
(Hungary) A Kapros (Australia) C Wheeler	7	6
(Slovakia) M Babáková (Mexico) Z Reyes	4	5
6	(Czech Republic) E Birnerová (South Africa) A Mojzis	6	7
3	(Greece) E Daniilidou (France) V Razzano	6	6
(Czech Republic) I Benešová (Romania) I Gaspar-Ivan	1	4
(United States) L Barnikow (United States) K McCain	6	2
(Russia) E Kozhokhina (Russia) A Rodionova	7	6
(Croatia) I Abramović (Croatia) D Krstulović	4	4
(Canada) K Krishnamurthy (Canada) M-È Pelletier	6	6
(Ukraine) Y Beygelzimer (Madagascar) A Rafolomanantsiatosik	1	2
7	(Slovakia) L Dlhopolcová (Slovakia) Ľ Kurhajcová	6	6

Second round
1	(Czech Republic) D Bedáňová (Uzbekistan) I Tulyaganova	6	6
(United States) M Bradley (United States) D Schwartz	2	4
(Hungary) A Kapros (Australia) C Wheeler	5	6	3
6	(Czech Republic) E Birnerová (South Africa) A Mojzis	7	4	6
3	(Greece) E Daniilidou (France) V Razzano	6	6
(Russia) E Kozhokhina (Russia) A Rodionova	2	3
(Canada) K Krishnamurthy (Canada) M-È Pelletier	6	1	6
7	(Slovakia) L Dlhopolcová (Slovakia) Ľ Kurhajcová	2	6	4

Quarterfinals
1	(Czech Republic) D Bedáňová (Uzbekistan) I Tulyaganova	6	7
6	(Czech Republic) E Birnerová (South Africa) A Mojzis	4	5
3	(Greece) E Daniilidou (France) V Razzano	6	6
(Canada) K Krishnamurthy (Canada) M-È Pelletier	1	2

Semifinals
1	(Czech Republic) D Bedáňová (Uzbekistan) I Tulyaganova	6	7
3	(Greece) E Daniilidou (France) V Razzano	1	6

=== Bottom half ===
First round
5	(Switzerland) L Bao (United Kingdom) H Collin	5	4
(United Kingdom) E Baltacha (United Kingdom) A Barnes	7	6
(Austria) B Hellwig (Austria) B Resch	1	7	5
(Russia) G Fokina (Russia) L Krasnoroutskaya	6	6	7
(Italy) ME Camerin (Argentina) G Dulko	6	6
(Netherlands) M Hoogland (United Kingdom) A Keothavong	4	2
(Japan) K Aoyama (Thailand) S Viratprasert	2	2
4	(United States) A Cargill (United States) L Granville	6	6
8	(Netherlands) M Gerards (South Africa) N Grandin	7	6
(United States) T Cochran (United States) A Harkleroad	6	2
(Mexico) M J López Herrera (Mexico) D Reynolds	1	2
(Germany) M Buric (Germany) S Werner	6	6
(Republic of Ireland) E O'Riain (United States) J Rotondi	4	6	6
(United States) J Hopkins (United States) J Scaringe	6	4	2
(Australia) M Adamczak (Australia) M Dowse	3	4
2	(Slovakia) K Bašternáková (Slovakia) S Hrozenská	6	6

Second round
(United Kingdom) E Baltacha (United Kingdom) A Barnes	6	2	0
(Russia) G Fokina (Russia) L Krasnoroutskaya	3	6	6
(Italy) ME Camerin (Argentina) G Dulko	7	4	5
4	(United States) A Cargill (United States) L Granville	6	6	7
8	(Netherlands) M Gerards (South Africa) N Grandin	3	7	5
(Germany) M Buric (Germany) S Werner	6	6	7
(Republic of Ireland) E O'Riain (United States) J Rotondi	3	3
2	(Slovakia) K Bašternáková (Slovakia) S Hrozenská	6	6

Quarterfinals
(Russia) G Fokina (Russia) L Krasnoroutskaya	w/o
4	(United States) A Cargill (United States) L Granville
(Germany) M Buric (Germany) S Werner	3	3
2	(Slovakia) K Bašternáková (Slovakia) S Hrozenská	6	6

Semifinals
(Russia) G Fokina (Russia) L Krasnoroutskaya	7	3	6
2	(Slovakia) K Bašternáková (Slovakia) S Hrozenská	5	6	2
