= 1999 US Open – Girls' singles =

Girls' singles
- 1999 US Open

Final
- Champion: (Russia) Lina Krasnoroutskaya
- Runner-up: (Russia) Nadia Petrova
- Score: 6–3, 6–2

Events
Singles	men	women		boys	girls
Doubles	men	women	mixed	boys	girls
WC Singles	men	women	quad
WC Doubles	men	women	quad
Legends	men	women	mixed
- US Open

Jelena Dokić was the defending champion, but did not complete in the Juniors this year.

Lina Krasnoroutskaya won the title, defeating Nadia Petrova in the final in what was the second all-Russian Girls' singles Grand Slam final. This win solidified her ranking to become the Year-End Junior World No. 1.

== Seeds ==
1. (France) Virginie Razzano (third round)
2. (Russia) Nadia Petrova (final)
3. (United States) Jennifer Hopkins (quarterfinals)
4. (United States) Melissa Middleton (first round)
5. (Uzbekistan) Iroda Tulyaganova (semifinals)
6. (Russia) Lina Krasnoroutskaya (champion)
7. (Greece) Eleni Daniilidou (semifinals)
8. (Germany) Mia Buric (second round)
9. (Switzerland) Laura Bao (first round)
10. (Slovakia) Stanislava Hrozenská (third round)
11. (United States) Laura Granville (quarterfinals, withdrew)
12. (United Kingdom) Hannah Collin (second round)
13. (Russia) Anastasia Rodionova (third round)
14. (Hungary) Anikó Kapros (quarterfinals)
15. (Czech Republic) Dája Bedáňová (quarterfinals)
16. (Slovakia) Katarína Bašternáková (first round)

== Draw ==
Key

- Q = Qualifier
- WC = Wild card
- LL = Lucky loser
- Alt = Alternate
- ITF = ITF entry
- PR = Protected ranking
- SR = Special ranking
- SE = Special exempt
- JE = Junior exempt
- JR = Junior Accelerator Programme entrant
- CO = College Accelerator Programme entrant
- NG = Next Gen Accelerator Program entrant
- w/o = Walkover
- r = Retired
- d = Defaulted

=== Finals ===
Quarterfinals
11	(United States) Laura Granville
6	(Russia) Lina Krasnoroutskaya	w/o
3	(United States) Jennifer Hopkins	6	1	3
5	(Uzbekistan) Iroda Tulyaganova	2	6	6
7	(Greece) Eleni Daniilidou	7	7
15	(Czech Republic) Dája Bedáňová	5	5
14	(Hungary) Anikó Kapros	5	4
2	(Russia) Nadia Petrova	7	6

Semifinals
6	(Russia) Lina Krasnoroutskaya	6	3	6
5	(Uzbekistan) Iroda Tulyaganova	4	6	1
7	(Greece) Eleni Daniilidou	6	2
2	(Russia) Nadia Petrova	7	6

Final
6	(Russia) Lina Krasnoroutskaya	6	6
2	(Russia) Nadia Petrova	3	2

=== Top half ===
==== Section 1 ====
First round
1	(France) V Razzano	7	6
(Croatia) I Abramović	6	2
(Slovakia) M Babáková	6	3	6
(United States) L Barnikow	3	6	4
(South Africa) A Mojzis	6	6
(Hungary) K Berecz	3	2
(United Kingdom) E Baltacha	2	0
11	(United States) L Granville	6	6
16	(Slovakia) K Bašternáková	1	6	1
(Australia) M Dowse	6	3	6
(Russia) E Kozhokhina	3	1
(Norway) C Tidemand	6	6
(Canada) K Krishnamurthy	2	3
(Czech Republic) E Birnerová	6	6
(Netherlands) M Hoogland	0	7	3
6	(Russia) L Krasnoroutskaya	6	5	6

Second round
1	(France) V Razzano	6	6
(Slovakia) M Babáková	2	2
(South Africa) A Mojzis	0	1
11	(United States) L Granville	6	6
(Australia) M Dowse	6	6
(Norway) C Tidemand	2	4
(Czech Republic) E Birnerová	5	4
6	(Russia) L Krasnoroutskaya	7	6

Third round
1	(France) V Razzano	6	5	3
11	(United States) L Granville	1	7	6
(Australia) M Dowse	7	5	4
(Russia) L Krasnoroutskaya	5	7	6

Quarterfinals
11	(United States) L Granville
6	(Russia) L Krasnoroutskaya	w/o

==== Section 2 ====
First round
3	(United States) J Hopkins	6	6
(Australia) C Wheeler	3	0
(United States) A Harkleroad	6	3	6
(United States) T Cochran	4	6	2
(Madagascar) A Rafolomanantsiatosik	5	0
(Russia) G Fokina	7	6
(Germany) S Werner	3	2
12	(United Kingdom) H Collin	6	6
9	(Switzerland) L Bao	1	4
(Japan) K Aoyama	6	6
(Austria) B Resch	4	2
(Hungary) M Czink	6	6
(Mexico) D Reynolds	0	0
(Slovakia) Ľ Kurhajcová	6	6
(Republic of Ireland) E O'Riain	2	3
5	(Uzbekistan) I Tulyaganova	6	6

Second round
3	(United States) J Hopkins	6	6
(United States) A Harkleroad	1	4
(Russia) G Fokina	7	4	6
12	(United Kingdom) H Collin	6	6	3
(Japan) K Aoyama	4	4
(Hungary) M Czink	6	6
(Slovakia) Ľ Kurhajcová	4	5
5	(Uzbekistan) I Tulyaganova	6	7

Third round
3	(United States) J Hopkins	6	7
(Russia) G Fokina	4	6
(Hungary) M Czink	5	3
5	(Uzbekistan) I Tulyaganova	7	6

Quarterfinals
3	(United States) J Hopkins	6	1	3
5	(Uzbekistan) I Tulyaganova	2	6	6

=== Bottom half ===
==== Section 3 ====
First round
7	(Greece) E Daniilidou	3	6	6
(United Kingdom) A Keothavong	6	3	3
(Croatia) D Krstulović	6	3	6
(Mexico) M J López Herrera	1	6	2
(Argentina) G Dulko	6	7
(United States) A Cohen	3	5
(Romania) I Gaspar-Ivan	4	5
13	(Russia) A Rodionova	6	7
15	(Czech Republic) D Bedáňová	6	6
(Thailand) S Viratprasert	2	3
(Austria) B Hellwig	6	5
(Hungary) T Németh	7	7
(Slovakia) L Dlhopolcová	2	4
(Canada) M-È Pelletier	6	6
(Australia) M Adamczak	6	6
4	(United States) M Middleton	4	4

Second round
7	(Greece) E Daniilidou	6	6
(Croatia) D Krstulović	4	2
(Argentina) G Dulko	2	3
13	(Russia) A Rodionova	6	6
15	(Czech Republic) D Bedáňová	7	7
(Hungary) T Németh	5	6
(Canada) M-È Pelletier	3	1
(Australia) M Adamczak	6	6

Third round
7	(Greece) E Daniilidou	6	6
13	(Russia) A Rodionova	2	3
15	(Czech Republic) D Bedáňová	6	6
(Australia) M Adamczak	0	2

Quarterfinals
7	(Greece) E Daniilidou	7	7
15	(Czech Republic) D Bedáňová	5	5

==== Section 4 ====
First round
8	(Germany) M Buric	6	6
(Chile) V Castro	3	2
(South Africa) N Grandin	6	5	6
(United States) A Cargill	4	7	7
(Czech Republic) I Benešová	3	7	6
(Italy) ME Camerin	6	6	2
(United States) M Bradley	3	2
14	(Hungary) A Kapros	6	6
10	(Slovakia) S Hrozenská	6	6
(United Kingdom) A Barnes	3	2
(Ukraine) Y Beygelzimer	6	3	4
(United States) K McCain	1	6	6
(Mexico) Z Reyes	6	6
(United States) J Scaringe	4	0
(Netherlands) M Gerards	2	2
2	(Russia) N Petrova	6	6

Second round
8	(Germany) M Buric	4	3
(United States) A Cargill	6	6
(Czech Republic) I Benešová	2	6	5
14	(Hungary) A Kapros	6	3	7
10	(Slovakia) S Hrozenská	6	6
(United States) K McCain	4	3
(Mexico) Z Reyes	2	0
2	(Russia) N Petrova	6	6

Third round
(United States) A Cargill	2	2
14	(Hungary) A Kapros	6	6
10	(Slovakia) S Hrozenská	6	1
2	(Russia) N Petrova	7	6

Quarterfinals
14	(Hungary) A Kapros	5	4
2	(Russia) N Petrova	7	6
