= 1999 US Open – Boys' singles =

Boys' singles
- 1999 US Open

Final
- Champion: (Finland) Jarkko Nieminen
- Runner-up: (Denmark) Kristian Pless
- Score: 6–7, 6–3, 6–4

Events
Singles	men	women		boys	girls
Doubles	men	women	mixed	boys	girls
WC Singles	men	women	quad
WC Doubles	men	women	quad
Legends	men	women	mixed
- US Open

David Nalbandian was the defending champion, but did not compete this year.

Finnish player Jarkko Nieminen defeated Danish first seed Kristian Pless in the all-Nordic final, 6–7, 6–3, 6–4.

== Seeds ==
1. (Denmark) Kristian Pless (final)
2. (Georgia (country)) Irakli Labadze (quarterfinals)
3. (Argentina) José Acasuso (second round)
4. (Thailand) Danai Udomchoke (third round)
5. (Argentina) Guillermo Coria (second round)
6. (France) Éric Prodon (first round)
7. (Finland) Jarkko Nieminen (champion)
8. (United States) Phillip King (quarterfinals)
9. (Bulgaria) Todor Enev (third round)
10. (United States) Mardy Fish (quarterfinals)
11. (Sweden) Joachim Johansson (first round)
12. (France) Nicolas Mahut (semifinals)
13. (United States) Andy Roddick (first round)
14. (Germany) Maximillian Abel (third round)
15. (United States) Levar Harper-Griffith (third round)
16. (Croatia) Mario Ančić (second round)

== Draw ==
Key

- Q = Qualifier
- WC = Wild card
- LL = Lucky loser
- Alt = Alternate
- ITF = ITF entry
- PR = Protected ranking
- SR = Special ranking
- SE = Special exempt
- JE = Junior exempt
- JR = Junior Accelerator Programme entrant
- CO = College Accelerator Programme entrant
- NG = Next Gen Accelerator Program entrant
- w/o = Walkover
- r = Retired
- d = Defaulted

=== Finals ===
Quarterfinals
1	(Denmark) Kristian Pless	6	6
(France) Julien Benneteau	2	4
10	(United States) Mardy Fish	2	4
(Russia) Dmitry Vlasov	6	6
8	(United States) Phillip King	5	4
12	(France) Nicolas Mahut	7	6
7	(Finland) Jarkko Nieminen	5	6	6
2	(Georgia (country)) Irakli Labadze	7	3	4

Semifinals
1	(Denmark) Kristian Pless	6	7
(Russia) Dmitry Vlasov	3	6
12	(France) Nicolas Mahut	4	5
7	(Finland) Jarkko Nieminen	6	7

Final
1	(Denmark) Kristian Pless	7	3	4
7	(Finland) Jarkko Nieminen	6	6	6

=== Top half ===
==== Section 1 ====
First round
1	(Denmark) Kristian Pless	2	6	7
(Croatia) Roko Karanušić	6	1	6
(United Kingdom) Lee Childs	6	6
(Israel) Tomer Suissa	4	1
(Belarus) Vitali Chvets	6	6
(United States) Yorke Allen	1	1
(Chinese Taipei) Wang Yeu-tzuoo	4	4
15	(United States) Levar Harper-Griffith	6	6
11	(Sweden) Joachim Johansson	3	7	3
(Venezuela) Jhonnatan Medina-Álvarez	6	6	6
(Hong Kong) Wong Wing-luen	5	2
(Germany) Philipp Hammer	7	6
(France) Julien Benneteau	7	6	6
(Finland) Timo Nieminen	5	7	1
(United States) Steve Berke	3	6
5	(Argentina) Guillermo Coria	6	7

Second round
1	(Denmark) K Pless	7	6
(United Kingdom) L Childs	6	4
(Belarus) V Chvets	6	2	6
15	(United States) L Harper-Griffith	3	6	7
(Venezuela) J Medina-Álvarez	2	1
(Germany) P Hammer	6	6
(France) J Benneteau	6	3	6
5	(Argentina) G Coria	4	6	1

Third round
1	(Denmark) K Pless	6	3	6
15	(United States) L Harper-Griffith	3	6	3
(Germany) P Hammer	6	1	1
(France) J Benneteau	3	6	6

Quarterfinals
1	(Denmark) K Pless	6	6
(France) J Benneteau	2	4

==== Section 2 ====
First round
4	(Thailand) Danai Udomchoke	5	7	6
(Mexico) Daniel Langre	7	5	2
(Belgium) Renaud Thys	6	1
(Poland) Radosław Nijaki	7	6
(Sweden) Filip Prpic	7	7
(Morocco) Hicham Fathi El Idrissi	6	5
(United States) Tres Davis	1	6	4
10	(United States) Mardy Fish	6	2	6
9	(Bulgaria) Todor Enev	6	6
(Germany) Christian-Michael Straka	2	3
(Republic of Ireland) Stephen Nugent	4	2
(United States) Robby Ginepri	6	6
(Norway) Stian Boretti	2	1
(Netherlands Antilles) Jean-Julien Rojer	6	6
(Russia) Dmitry Vlasov	7	6
6	(France) Éric Prodon	6	4

Second round
4	(Thailand) D Udomchoke	6	7	6
(Poland) R Nijaki	7	5	1
(Sweden) F Prpic	6	1	4
10	(United States) M Fish	2	6	6
9	(Bulgaria) T Enev	6	6
(United States) R Ginepri	4	3
(Netherlands Antilles) J-J Rojer	1	6	2
(Russia) Dmitry Vlasov	6	4	6

Third round
4	(Thailand) D Udomchoke	4	4
10	(United States) M Fish	6	6
9	(Bulgaria) T Enev	3	6	4
(Russia) Dmitry Vlasov	6	0	6

Quarterfinals
10	(United States) M Fish	2	4
(Russia) Dmitry Vlasov	6	6

=== Bottom half ===
==== Section 3 ====
First round
8	(United States) Phillip King	7	6
(Sweden) Jonas Fröberg	6	4
(United States) Ryan Newport	2	1
(Chile) Julio Peralta	6	6
(Federal Republic of Yugoslavia) Boris Pašanski	3	1
(Germany) Denis Gremelmayr	6	6
(United States) Simone Amorico	3	6
16	(Croatia) Mario Ančić	6	7
12	(France) Nicolas Mahut	6	6
(Benin) Arnaud Segodo	5	2
(Chinese Taipei) Lu Yen-hsun	6	4	2
(United States) Lesley Joseph	4	6	6
(Japan) Hayato Furukawa	4	1
(United States) David Martin	6	6
(United States) Ytai Abougzir	7	1	4
3	(Argentina) José Acasuso	5	6	6

Second round
8	(United States) P King	7	7
(Chile) J Peralta	6	5
(Germany) D Gremelmayr	6	6
16	(Croatia) M Ančić	4	2
12	(France) N Mahut	6	6
(United States) L Joseph	3	2
(United States) D Martin	6	6
3	(Argentina) J Acasuso	0	2

Third round
8	(United States) P King	4	6	6
(Germany) D Gremelmayr	6	0	0
12	(France) N Mahut	6	6
(United States) D Martin	3	2

Quarterfinals
8	(United States) P King	5	4
12	(France) N Mahut	7	6

==== Section 4 ====
First round
7	(Finland) Jarkko Nieminen	6	6
(Chile) Phillip Harboe	3	3
(United States) John-Paul Fruttero	6	6
(Egypt) Mohamed Mamoun	1	4
(United States) Alex Bogomolov Jr.	6	6
(Germany) Dirk Britzen	4	2
(New Zealand) Lee Radovanovich	2	3
14	(Germany) Maximillian Abel	6	6
13	(United States) Andy Roddick	6	4	6
(United States) Scott Lipsky	3	6	7
(South Africa) Peter-John Nomdo	7	6
(United States) Timothy Martin	6	2
(United States) Philip Stolt	2	4
(France) Julien Cassaigne	6	6
(United Kingdom) Mark Hitlon	6	4	3
2	(Georgia (country)) Irakli Labadze	4	6	6

Second round
7	(Finland) J Nieminen	6	6
(United States) J-P Fruttero	1	2
(United States) A Bogomolov Jr.	0	6
14	(Germany) M Abel	6	7
(United States) S Lipsky	3	6
(South Africa) P-J Nomdo	6	7
(France) J Cassaigne	2	4
2	(Georgia (country)) I Labadze	6	6

Third round
7	(Finland) J Nieminen	6	6
14	(Germany) M Abel	4	4
(South Africa) P-J Nomdo	4	6
2	(Georgia (country)) I Labadze	6	7

Quarterfinals
7	(Finland) J Nieminen	5	6	6
2	(Georgia (country)) I Labadze	7	3	4
