= Tiffany Brymer =

American tennis player

- Full name: Tiffany Alexandra Brymer
- Country (sports): United States
- Born: January 21, 1981 (age 44) Tarzana, California, U.S.
- Plays: Right-handed
- Prize money: $4,500

Doubles
- Career record: 0–1

Grand Slam doubles results
- US Open: 1R (1999)

Tiffany Alexandra Brymer (born January 21, 1981) is an American former tennis player.

Born in Tarzana, Brymer won the USTA Girls' 18 National Championship in doubles partnering Abigail Spears, with whom she received a wildcard to compete in the doubles main draw of the 1999 US Open. The pair were beaten in the first round by 16th seeds Liezel Horn and Kimberly Po. From 1999 to 2003 she played tennis for the USC Trojans, where she was twice named All-American.

Brymer's brother Chris was an American football player with the Dallas Cowboys.
