= 1999 US Open – Men's doubles =

Men's doubles
- 1999 US Open

Final
- Champion: (United States) Alex O'Brien (Canada) Sébastien Lareau
- Runner-up: (India) Mahesh Bhupathi (India) Leander Paes
- Score: 7–6^{(9–7)}, 6–4

Details
- Draw: 64
- Seeds: 16

Events
Singles	men	women		boys	girls
Doubles	men	women	mixed	boys	girls
WC Singles	men	women	quad
WC Doubles	men	women	quad
Legends	men	women	mixed
← 1998 ·	US Open	· 2000 →

Sandon Stolle and Cyril Suk were the defending champions, but Stolle competed with Wayne Black, while Suk competed with Donald Johnson this year. Suk and Johnson were defeated by Stolle and Black in the third round, while Stolle and Black were defeated by Andrei Olhovskiy and David Prinosil in the quarterfinals.

Alex O'Brien and Sébastien Lareau won the title, defeating Indian first seeds Mahesh Bhupathi and Leander Paes in the final, 7–6^{(9–7)}, 6–4.

== Seeds ==
1. (India) Mahesh Bhupathi / (India) Leander Paes (final)
2. (Netherlands) Paul Haarhuis / (United States) Jared Palmer (first round)
3. (Australia) Todd Woodbridge / (Australia) Mark Woodforde (quarterfinals)
4. (South Africa) David Adams / (South Africa) John-Laffnie de Jager (second round)
5. (France) Olivier Delaître / (France) Fabrice Santoro (second round, withdrew)
6. (Australia) Sandon Stolle / (Zimbabwe) Wayne Black (quarterfinals)
7. (Sweden) Jonas Björkman / (Zimbabwe) Byron Black (semifinals)
8. (South Africa) Ellis Ferreira / (United States) Rick Leach (second round)
9. (The Bahamas) Mark Knowles / (Canada) Daniel Nestor (first round)
10. (Russia) Yevgeny Kafelnikov / (Czech Republic) Daniel Vacek (first round)
11. (United States) Alex O'Brien / (Canada) Sébastien Lareau (champions)
12. (United States) Donald Johnson / (Czech Republic) Cyril Suk (third round)
13. (Croatia) Goran Ivanišević / (United States) Jeff Tarango (first round)
14. (Sweden) Nicklas Kulti / (Sweden) Mikael Tillström (first round)
15. (United States) Justin Gimelstob / (United States) Richey Reneberg (third round)
16. (Czech Republic) Jiří Novák / (Czech Republic) David Rikl (third round)

== Draw ==
=== Key ===
- Q = Qualifier
- WC = Wild card
- LL = Lucky loser
- Alt = Alternate
- ITF = ITF entry
- PR = Protected ranking
- SR = Special ranking
- SE = Special exempt
- JE = Junior exempt
- JR = Junior Accelerator Programme entrant
- CO = College Accelerator Programme entrant
- NG = Next Gen Accelerator Program entrant
- w/o = Walkover
- r = Retired
- d = Defaulted

=== Finals ===
Quarterfinals
1	(India) Mahesh Bhupathi (India) Leander Paes	6	6
Q	(Australia) Ben Ellwood (Australia) Michael Tebbutt	3	4
(Russia) Andrei Olhovskiy (Germany) David Prinosil	6	6
6	(Australia) Sandon Stolle (Zimbabwe) Wayne Black	4	2
11	(United States) Alex O'Brien (Canada) Sébastien Lareau	7^{7}	5	6
3	(Australia) Todd Woodbridge (Australia) Mark Woodforde	6^{2}	7	3
7	(Sweden) Jonas Björkman (Zimbabwe) Byron Black	6	6
(South Africa) Jeff Coetzee (South Africa) Brent Haygarth	3	3

Semifinals
1	(India) Mahesh Bhupathi (India) Leander Paes	6	6
(Russia) Andrei Olhovskiy (Germany) David Prinosil	4	3
11	(United States) Alex O'Brien (Canada) Sébastien Lareau	6	7^{7}
7	(Sweden) Jonas Björkman (Zimbabwe) Byron Black	4	6^{3}

Final
1	(India) Mahesh Bhupathi (India) Leander Paes	6^{7}	4
11	(United States) Alex O'Brien (Canada) Sébastien Lareau	7^{9}	6

=== Top half ===
==== Section 1 ====
First round
1	(India) M Bhupathi (India) L Paes	6	6
(South Africa) P Norval (Zimbabwe) K Ullyett	4	4
(North Macedonia) A Kitinov (United States) J Waite	6	4	6^{7}
WC	(United States) J-M Gambill (United States) A Peterson	1	6	7^{9}
WC	(United States) J Blake (United States) T Blake	4	4
(Portugal) N Marques (Belgium) T Vanhoudt	6	6
(United States) B Coupe (South Africa) R Koenig	2	2
15	(United States) J Gimelstob (United States) R Reneberg	6	6
10	(Russia) Y Kafelnikov (Czech Republic) D Vacek	2	7^{11}	6^{10}
Q	(Australia) B Ellwood (Australia) M Tebbutt	6	6^{9}	7^{12}
(United Kingdom) N Broad (Australia) P Tramacchi	7^{7}	7
(Brazil) J Oncins (Argentina) D Orsanic	6^{5}	5
WC	(United States) P Goldstein (United States) C Woodruff	4	0
(South Africa) N Godwin (South Africa) M Ondruska	6	6
(United States) D DiLucia (United States) M Sell	1	4
8	(South Africa) E Ferreira (United States) R Leach	6	6

Second round
1	(India) M Bhupathi (India) L Paes	7^{7}	7
WC	(United States) J-M Gambill (United States) A Peterson	6^{4}	5
(Portugal) N Marques (Belgium) T Vanhoudt	2	7^{7}	6^{5}
15	(United States) J Gimelstob (United States) R Reneberg	6	6^{5}	7^{7}
Q	(Australia) B Ellwood (Australia) M Tebbutt	6	7
(United Kingdom) N Broad (Australia) P Tramacchi	4	5
(South Africa) N Godwin (South Africa) M Ondruska	6	6
8	(South Africa) E Ferreira (United States) R Leach	4	4

Third round
1	(India) M Bhupathi (India) L Paes	2	6	6
15	(United States) J Gimelstob (United States) R Reneberg	6	4	3
Q	(Australia) B Ellwood (Australia) M Tebbutt	6	3	6
(South Africa) N Godwin (South Africa) M Ondruska	4	6	2

Quarterfinals
1	(India) M Bhupathi (India) L Paes	6	6
Q	(Australia) B Ellwood (Australia) M Tebbutt	3	4

==== Section 2 ====
First round
4	(South Africa) D Adams (South Africa) J-L de Jager	6	7
Q	(Venezuela) M Ruah (Brazil) A Sá	3	5
WC	(United States) L Jensen (United States) M Jensen	3	6^{2}
(Russia) A Olhovskiy (Germany) D Prinosil	6	7^{7}
(Australia) A Florent (Australia) D Macpherson	6	6^{4}	7^{8}
(Netherlands) S Schalken (Netherlands) J Siemerink	4	7^{7}	6^{6}
(Serbia and Montenegro) N Zimonjić (United States) B MacPhie	6	2	6
13	(Croatia) G Ivanišević (United States) J Tarango	4	6	1
12	(United States) D Johnson (Czech Republic) C Suk	6	7^{7}
(Spain) A Martín (Spain) J Sánchez	2	6^{4}
(United States) D Bowen (Israel) E Ran	6	3	1
(United States) D Flach (United States) G Grant	3	6	6
(Argentina) P Albano (Spain) T Carbonell	6	6
(Czech Republic) T Cibulec (Spain) A Portas	3	2
(Argentina) D del Rio (Argentina) M Rodríguez	1	4
6	(Australia) S Stolle (Zimbabwe) W Black	6	6

Second round
4	(South Africa) D Adams (South Africa) J-L de Jager	4	6^{6}
(Russia) A Olhovskiy (Germany) D Prinosil	6	7^{8}
(Australia) A Florent (Australia) D Macpherson	6^{3}	3
(Serbia and Montenegro) N Zimonjić (United States) B MacPhie	7^{7}	6
12	(United States) D Johnson (Czech Republic) C Suk	7^{7}	6^{5}	6
(United States) D Flach (United States) G Grant	6^{3}	7^{7}	2
(Argentina) P Albano (Spain) T Carbonell	3	4
6	(Australia) S Stolle (Zimbabwe) W Black	6	6

Third round
(Russia) A Olhovskiy (Germany) D Prinosil	7^{7}	6
(Serbia and Montenegro) N Zimonjić (United States) B MacPhie	6^{3}	3
12	(United States) D Johnson (Czech Republic) C Suk	3	4
6	(Australia) S Stolle (Zimbabwe) W Black	6	6

Quarterfinals
(Russia) A Olhovskiy (Germany) D Prinosil	6	6
6	(Australia) S Stolle (Zimbabwe) W Black	4	2

=== Bottom half ===
==== Section 3 ====
First round
5	(France) F Santoro (France) O Delaître	6	6
WC	(United States) K Kim (Philippines) C Mamiit	1	1
(Philippines) E Taino (Italy) L Tieleman	6	5	3
(South Africa) C Haggard (Sweden) P Nyborg	4	7	6
(United States) M Keil (Argentina) L Lobo	2	6	6
(Argentina) M García (Mexico) D Roditi	6	4	4
Q	(Japan) T Shimada (South Africa) M Wakefield	5	5
11	(United States) A O'Brien (Canada) S Lareau	7	7
14	(Sweden) N Kulti (Sweden) M Tillström	3	5
(Germany) M K Goellner (United States) F Montana	6	7
WC	(United States) L Harper-Griffith (United States) A Roddick	6	6
(United States) K. J. Hippensteel (United States) R Wolters	2	2
(Australia) M Hill (United States) S Humphries	4	6	6
(Spain) E Nicolas (Spain) G Puentes	6	2	3
(Serbia and Montenegro) N Djordjević (Germany) M Kohlmann	5	2
3	(Australia) T Woodbridge (Australia) M Woodforde	7	6

Second round
5	(France) F Santoro (France) O Delaître	w/o
(South Africa) C Haggard (Sweden) P Nyborg
(United States) M Keil (Argentina) L Lobo	4	0
11	(United States) A O'Brien (Canada) S Lareau	6	6
(Germany) M K Goellner (United States) F Montana	6	6
WC	(United States) L Harper-Griffith (United States) A Roddick	3	1
(Australia) M Hill (United States) S Humphries	6^{5}	3
3	(Australia) T Woodbridge (Australia) M Woodforde	7^{7}	6

Third round
(South Africa) C Haggard (Sweden) P Nyborg	2	4
11	(United States) A O'Brien (Canada) S Lareau	6	6
(Germany) M K Goellner (United States) F Montana	3	0
3	(Australia) T Woodbridge (Australia) M Woodforde	6	6

Quarterfinals
11	(United States) A O'Brien (Canada) S Lareau	7^{7}	5	6
3	(Australia) T Woodbridge (Australia) M Woodforde	6^{2}	7	3

==== Section 4 ====
First round
7	(Sweden) J Björkman (Zimbabwe) B Black	6^{6}	6	6
(Czech Republic) M Damm (Belarus) M Mirnyi	7^{8}	1	2
(Spain) JI Carrasco (Spain) J Velasco Jr.	3	3
(South Africa) L Bale (South Africa) G Stafford	6	6
(Australia) W Arthurs (Australia) A Kratzmann	6	3
(Italy) M Bertolini (Italy) C Brandi	3	2	r
(United States) J Grabb (United States) J Stark	2	6	6
9	(The Bahamas) M Knowles (Canada) D Nestor	6	4	4
16	(Czech Republic) J Novák (Czech Republic) D Rikl	7^{7}	6
(United States) B Bryan (United States) M Bryan	6^{1}	3
Q	(United States) M Sprengelmeyer (South Africa) J Weir-Smith	6	6^{7}	4
(Argentina) M Hood (Argentina) S Prieto	4	7^{9}	6
(South Africa) M Barnard (United States) TJ Middleton	6	7^{7}
(Czech Republic) P Pála (Czech Republic) P Vízner	3	6^{5}
(South Africa) J Coetzee (South Africa) B Haygarth	3	7^{8}	6
2	(Netherlands) P Haarhuis (United States) J Palmer	6	6^{6}	4

Second round
7	(Sweden) J Björkman (Zimbabwe) B Black	6	6
(South Africa) L Bale (South Africa) G Stafford	3	1
(Australia) W Arthurs (Australia) A Kratzmann	6	6
(United States) J Grabb (United States) J Stark	3	4
16	(Czech Republic) J Novák (Czech Republic) D Rikl	6	6
(Argentina) M Hood (Argentina) S Príeto	3	2
(South Africa) M Barnard (United States) TJ Middleton	4	6	5
(South Africa) J Coetzee (South Africa) B Haygarth	6	3	7

Third round
7	(Sweden) J Björkman (Zimbabwe) B Black	6	2	7
(Australia) W Arthurs (Australia) A Kratzmann	1	6	6
16	(Czech Republic) J Novák (Czech Republic) D Rikl	6^{6}	2
(South Africa) J Coetzee (South Africa) B Haygarth	7^{8}	6

Quarterfinals
7	(Sweden) J Björkman (Zimbabwe) B Black	6	6
(South Africa) J Coetzee (South Africa) B Haygarth	3	3
