= Dmitry Vlasov =

Russian tennis player

- Full name: Dmitry Vlasov
- Country (sports): Russia
- Born: 11 July 1982 (age 44) Tula, Soviet Union
- Prize money: $99,524

Singles
- Career record: 0–1
- Career titles: 0
- Highest ranking: No. 240 (5 May 2003)

Doubles
- Highest ranking: No. 146 (8 September 2003)

Dmitry Vlasov (born 11 July 1982) is a former professional tennis player from Russia.

== Biography ==
Vlasov, who is originally from Tula, was ranked as high as 11 in the world for singles during his junior career and had wins over future top players including David Nalbandian and Robin Söderling. He made the semi-finals of the boys' singles at the 1999 US Open.

His only appearance in the main draw of an ATP Tour tournament came at the 2001 Swedish Open. After defeating Radek Štěpánek to make it through qualifying, Vlasov lost to Spaniard Albert Portas in the first round.

A regular on the Challenger circuit, Vlasov won a total of four titles, all in doubles. He was runner-up in singles at the Togliatti Challenger in 2002 and had a win over Philipp Kohlschreiber at a Challenger tournament in the Indian city of Belgaum in 2003.

In 2005, he received a one year suspension after testing positive to Pemoline, reduced from two years after an appeal, from a sample given during qualifying for the 2004 Kremlin Cup.

== Challenger titles ==
=== Doubles: (4) ===
No.	Year	Tournament	Surface	Partner	Opponents	Score
1.	2002	Togliatti, Russia	Hard	(Russia) Philipp Mukhometov	(Russia) Artem Derepasko (Russia) Mikhail Elgin	6–4, 6–4
2.	2003	New Delhi, India	Hard	(Bulgaria) Radoslav Lukaev	(Israel) Jonathan Erlich (Israel) Andy Ram	7–6^{(6)}, 4–6, 6–2
3.	2003	Tampere, Finland	Clay	(Russia) Igor Andreev	(Argentina) Ignacio Hirigoyen (Argentina) Nicolás Todero	7–6^{(4)}, 6–1
4.	2004	Togliatti, Russia	Hard	(Russia) Teymuraz Gabashvili	(United Kingdom) James Auckland (Slovakia) Ladislav Švarc	6–3, 5–7, 6–4
