= Dora Krstulović =

Croatian tennis player (born 1981)

- Full name: Dora Krstulović
- Country (sports): Croatia
- Born: 19 June 1981 (age 43); Split, SR Croatia, Yugoslavia
- Plays: Right-handed
- Prize money: $5,932

Singles
- Career record: 10–11
- Highest ranking: No. 373 (1 March 1999)

Grand Slam singles results
- Australian Open Junior: 2R (1998)
- French Open Junior: 1R (1998) (1999)
- Wimbledon Junior: 2R (1998) (1999)
- US Open Junior: 2R (1997) (1999)

Doubles
- Career record: 1–3

Grand Slam doubles results
- Australian Open Junior: QF (1998)
- French Open Junior: SF (1999)
- Wimbledon Junior: QF (1998)
- US Open Junior: 2R (1997) (1999)

Team competitions
- Fed Cup: 0-1

Dora Krstulović (born 19 June 1981) is a former professional tennis player from Croatia.

== Biography ==
Born in Split, Krstulović is the daughter of basketball player Duje Krstulović, who won a gold medal as a member of the Yugoslavian team at the 1980 Moscow Olympics. As a junior she trained under Nick Bollettieri at the Bradenton Academy in Florida.

Krstulović, a right-handed player, made her only WTA Tour main draw appearance at the 1998 Croatian Bol Ladies Open, as a wildcard entrant. She also featured in the doubles match of a Fed Cup tie for Croatia in 1998, a World Group II quarter-final against Japan, in which she and partner Jelena Kostanic were beaten in the dead rubber by Rika Hiraki and Nana Miyagi. She finished up on tour in 1999 while still competing as a junior, reaching the French Open girls' doubles semi-finals that year with Laura Dell'Angelo, then played collegiate tennis in the United States at Arizona State University.

== ITF finals ==
=== Singles: 1 (runner-up) ===
$25,000 tournaments

Result	W–L	Date	Tournament	Tier	Surface	Opponent	Score
Loss	0–1	Sep 1998	ITF Manaus, Brazil	25,000	Hard	(Brazil) Vanessa Menga	6–1, 1–6, 2–6
