= 1999 US Open – Women's singles =

Women's singles
- 1999 US Open

Final
- Champion: (United States) Serena Williams
- Runner-up: (Switzerland) Martina Hingis
- Score: 6–3, 7–6^{(7–4)}

Details
- Draw: 128
- Seeds: 16

Events
Singles	men	women		boys	girls
Doubles	men	women	mixed	boys	girls
WC Singles	men	women	quad
WC Doubles	men	women	quad
Legends	men	women	mixed
← 1998 ·	US Open	· 2000 →

Serena Williams defeated Martina Hingis in the final, 6–3, 7–6^{(7–4)} to win the women's singles tennis title at the 1999 US Open. It was her first major singles title, and the first of an eventual Open Era record 23 major women's singles titles. Williams was the first African American woman in the Open Era to win a singles major, and the first since Althea Gibson at the 1958 U.S. National Championships.

Lindsay Davenport was the defending champion, but lost to Serena Williams in the semifinals.

== Seeds ==
1. (Switzerland) Martina Hingis (final)
2. (United States) Lindsay Davenport (semifinals)
3. (United States) Venus Williams (semifinals)
4. (United States) Monica Seles (quarterfinals)
5. (France) Mary Pierce (quarterfinals)
6. (South Africa) Amanda Coetzer (first round)
7. (United States) Serena Williams (champion)
8. (Czech Republic) Jana Novotná (third round)
9. (France) Julie Halard-Decugis (fourth round)
10. (Spain) Arantxa Sánchez Vicario (fourth round)
11. (France) Nathalie Tauziat (third round)
12. (Austria) Barbara Schett (quarterfinals)
13. (Belgium) Dominique Van Roost (third round)
14. (France) Sandrine Testud (second round)
15. (France) Amélie Mauresmo (fourth round)
16. (Spain) Conchita Martínez (fourth round)

== Draw ==
Key

- Q = Qualifier
- WC = Wild card
- LL = Lucky loser
- Alt = Alternate
- ITF = ITF entry
- PR = Protected ranking
- SR = Special ranking
- SE = Special exempt
- JE = Junior exempt
- JR = Junior Accelerator Programme entrant
- CO = College Accelerator Programme entrant
- NG = Next Gen Accelerator Program entrant
- w/o = Walkover
- r = Retired
- d = Defaulted

=== Finals ===
Quarterfinals
1	(Switzerland) Martina Hingis	6	6
(Germany) Anke Huber	2	0
3	(United States) Venus Williams	6	6
12	(Austria) Barbara Schett	4	3
7	(United States) Serena Williams	4	6	6
4	(United States) Monica Seles	6	3	2
5	(France) Mary Pierce	2	6	5
2	(United States) Lindsay Davenport	6	3	7

Semifinals
1	(Switzerland) Martina Hingis	6	4	6
3	(United States) Venus Williams	1	6	3
7	(United States) Serena Williams	6	1	6
2	(United States) Lindsay Davenport	4	6	4

Finals
1	(Switzerland) Martina Hingis	3	6^{4}
7	(United States) Serena Williams	6	7^{7}

=== Top half ===
==== Section 1 ====
First round
1	(Switzerland) M Hingis	6	7
(Czech Republic) K Hrdličková	1	5
WC	(United States) J Hopkins	4	2
(France) S Pitkowski	6	6
Q	(Germany) S Klösel	6	6
WC	(Czech Republic) Z Lešenarová	4	3
(Czech Republic) S Kleinová	7^{7}	3	5
(United States) J Chi	6^{5}	6	7
(Spain) C Torrens Valero	3	5
(Switzerland) P Schnyder	6	7
(France) É Loit	0	4
(United States) L Raymond	6	6
(Australia) N Pratt	6	6
(United States) M Tu	4	2
(Australia) J Dokić	5	1
10	(Spain) A Sánchez Vicario	7	6

Second round
1	(Switzerland) M Hingis	6	6
(France) S Pitkowski	1	1
Q	(Germany) S Klösel	6	7^{7}
(United States) J Chi	4	6^{4}
(Switzerland) P Schnyder	6	3	6
(United States) L Raymond	3	6	3
(Australia) N Pratt	2	2
10	(Spain) A Sánchez Vicario	6	6

Third round
1	(Switzerland) M Hingis	6	6
Q	(Germany) S Klösel	3	1
(Switzerland) P Schnyder	2	2
10	(Spain) A Sánchez Vicario	6	6

Fourth round
1	(Switzerland) M Hingis	6	7
10	(Spain) A Sánchez Vicario	4	5

==== Section 2 ====
First round
15	(France) A Mauresmo	6	6
(Belgium) J Henin	1	4
(United States) K Brandi	3	6^{5}
(South Africa) M de Swardt	6	7^{7}
(Croatia) M Lučić	6	6
WC	(United States) E deLone	3	3
(Slovakia) Ľ Cervanová	1	5
(United States) T Snyder	6	7
(Croatia) S Talaja	6	2	0
(Germany) A Huber	2	6	6
WC	(United States) J Craybas	2	2
(Luxembourg) A Kremer	6	6
Q	(Slovenia) T Križan	6	6
(United States) M Shaughnessy	3	3
(Chinese Taipei) S-t Wang	2	2
8	(Czech Republic) J Novotná	6	6

Second round
15	(France) A Mauresmo	4	6	6
(South Africa) M de Swardt	6	1	3
(Croatia) M Lučić	5	3
(United States) T Snyder	7	6
(Germany) A Huber	6	7^{7}
(Luxembourg) A Kremer	1	6^{5}
Q	(Slovenia) T Križan	0	3
8	(Czech Republic) J Novotná	6	6

Third round
15	(France) A Mauresmo	6	6
(United States) T Snyder	4	3
(Germany) A Huber	6	6
8	(Czech Republic) J Novotná	3	2

Fourth round
15	(France) A Mauresmo	4	4
(Germany) A Huber	6	6

==== Section 3 ====
First round
3	(United States) V Williams	6	6
Q	(Belarus) T Poutchek	1	2
(France) A-G Sidot	4	6	6
(Belgium) L Courtois	6	4	2
(Bulgaria) L Bacheva	1	4
(Slovakia) H Nagyová	6	6
Q	(Poland) M Grzybowska	6	6
(Canada) J Nejedly	1	4
Q	(Russia) A Myskina	6	6
Q	(Australia) L McShea	3	2
(Netherlands) M Oremans	6	4	2
(United States) MJ Fernández	3	6	6
(Italy) R Grande	7^{9}	4	6
(Austria) B Schwartz	6^{7}	6	4
(Canada) M Drake	1	0
13	(Belgium) D Van Roost	6	6

Second round
3	(United States) V Williams	6	6
(France) A-G Sidot	4	3
(Slovakia) H Nagyová	6	6
Q	(Poland) M Grzybowska	4	3
Q	(Russia) A Myskina	5	5
(United States) MJ Fernández	7	7
(Italy) R Grande	3	3
13	(Belgium) D Van Roost	6	6

Third round
3	(United States) V Williams
(Slovakia) H Nagyová	w/o
(United States) MJ Fernández	7	6
13	(Belgium) D Van Roost	5	0

Fourth round
3	(United States) V Williams	2	6	6
(United States) MJ Fernández	6	1	0

==== Section 4 ====
First round
12	(Austria) B Schett	6	6
Q	(United States) T Singian	0	1
Q	(Sweden) Å Carlsson	6	6
(Germany) A Glass	0	2
(Netherlands) A Hopmans	7^{7}	6
(Germany) E Wagner	6^{1}	3
(Switzerland) E Gagliardi	2	4
(Spain) V Ruano Pascual	6	6
(Russia) E Likhovtseva	6^{5}	6	6
Q	(Romania) C Cristea	7^{7}	4	1
(Czech Republic) D Chládková	3	4
Q	(Slovenia) T Pisnik	6	6
(Thailand) T Tanasugarn	7^{7}	6
(Russia) T Panova	6^{4}	1
(Romania) I Spîrlea	6	7
6	(South Africa) A Coetzer	1	5

Second round
12	(Austria) B Schett	6	6
Q	(Sweden) Å Carlsson	4	2
(Netherlands) A Hopmans	4	1
(Spain) V Ruano Pascual	6	6
(Russia) E Likhovtseva	6	6
Q	(Slovenia) T Pisnik	2	3
(Thailand) T Tanasugarn	6	5	3
(Romania) I Spîrlea	4	7	6

Third round
12	(Austria) B Schett	6	6
(Spain) V Ruano Pascual	1	0
(Russia) E Likhovtseva	6	6
(Romania) I Spîrlea	1	3

Fourth round
12	(Austria) B Schett	6	6
(Russia) E Likhovtseva	0	1

=== Bottom half ===
==== Section 5 ====
First round
7	(United States) S Williams	6	6
(United States) K Po	1	0
Q	(Croatia) J Kostanić	2	6	6
WC	(United States) M Washington	6	4	1
(France) N Dechy	6	0	2
Q	(Czech Republic) A Gerši	4	6	6
Q	(Germany) A Barna	5	1
(Belgium) K Clijsters	7	6
(Colombia) F Zuluaga	6	6
WC	(United States) L Granville	1	2
(Russia) E Dementieva	6	6
(Greece) C Papadáki	2	2
(Slovenia) K Srebotnik	1	4
(France) A Dechaume-Balleret	6	6
(United States) C Rubin	2	3
16	(Spain) C Martínez	6	6

Second round
7	(United States) S Williams	6	6
Q	(Croatia) J Kostanić	4	2
Q	(Czech Republic) A Gerši	3	2
(Belgium) K Clijsters	6	6
(Colombia) F Zuluaga	6	3	1
(Russia) E Dementieva	4	6	6
(France) A Dechaume-Balleret	0	0
16	(Spain) C Martínez	6	6

Third round
7	(United States) S Williams	4	6	7
(Belgium) K Clijsters	6	2	5
(Russia) E Dementieva	2	6	4
16	(Spain) C Martínez	6	2	6

Fourth round
7	(United States) S Williams	4	6	6
16	(Spain) C Martínez	6	2	2

==== Section 6 ====
First round
11	(France) N Tauziat	6	6
(United States) A Stevenson	2	2
(Spain) M Sánchez Lorenzo	5	6	6
Q	(Chinese Taipei) J Lee	7	3	4
(United States) J Capriati	6	7
(Croatia) I Majoli	1	5
(Italy) L Golarsa	2	1
(Netherlands) S Noorlander	6	6
(Slovakia) K Habšudová	6	6
(Czech Republic) L Němečková	3	1
(Japan) A Sugiyama	7^{7}	6
(Israel) A Smashnova	6^{5}	4
Q	(Venezuela) M Vento	4	0
(Italy) S Farina	6	6
(Germany) B Rittner	1	1
4	(United States) M Seles	6	6

Second round
11	(France) N Tauziat	7	4	6
(Spain) M Sánchez Lorenzo	5	6	1
(United States) J Capriati	5	6	6
(Netherlands) S Noorlander	7	1	4
(Slovakia) K Habšudová	2	6	5
(Japan) A Sugiyama	6	4	7
(Italy) S Farina	2	3
4	(United States) M Seles	6	6

Third round
11	(France) N Tauziat	3	6	1
(United States) J Capriati	6	1	6
(Japan) A Sugiyama	2	3
4	(United States) M Seles	6	6

Fourth round
(United States) J Capriati	4	3
4	(United States) M Seles	6	6

==== Section 7 ====
First round
5	(France) M Pierce	6	7
(Federal Republic of Yugoslavia) S Načuk	3	5
(Spain) G León García	6	7^{7}
(United States) B Rippner	4	6^{4}
(Belarus) O Barabanschikova	4	4
(Spain) Á Montolio	6	6
WC	(United States) M Middleton	4	1
(Argentina) P Suárez	6	6
(United States) L Osterloh	5	3
WC	(United States) S Reeves	7	6
Q	(Germany) J Kandarr	2	6^{3}
(Belgium) S Appelmans	6	7^{7}
(Spain) M Serna	6	1	7^{8}
(Belgium) E Callens	3	6	6^{6}
(Germany) M Weingärtner	6^{4}	4
14	(France) S Testud	7^{7}	6

Second round
5	(France) M Pierce	6	6
(Spain) G León García	2	3
(Spain) Á Montolio	7^{7}	6
(Argentina) P Suárez	6^{5}	2
WC	(United States) S Reeves	4	7^{7}	3
(Belgium) S Appelmans	6	6^{5}	6
(Spain) M Serna	6	6
14	(France) S Testud	3	3

Third round
5	(France) M Pierce	6	7^{7}
(Spain) Á Montolio	0	6^{4}
(Belgium) S Appelmans	0	6	6
(Spain) M Serna	6	1	3

Fourth round
5	(France) M Pierce	6	7^{8}
(Belgium) S Appelmans	3	6^{6}

==== Section 8 ====
First round
9	(France) J Halard-Decugis	6	5	6
(Zimbabwe) C Black	3	7	3
(China) F Li	6	6
(Bulgaria) P Stoyanova	1	3
(Austria) S Plischke	6	6
(Australia) A Molik	3	2
(France) A Cocheteux	6	6
(Ukraine) E Tatarkova	3	3
(Belarus) N Zvereva	6	6
(Argentina) I Gorrochategui	2	2
(United States) A Miller	2	6	3
(United States) A Frazier	6	3	6
(Romania) R Dragomir	6	5	6
(Hungary) R Kuti-Kis	1	7	4
(United States) C Morariu	0	3
2	(United States) L Davenport	6	6

Second round
9	(France) J Halard-Decugis	6	6
(China) F Li	2	4
(Austria) S Plischke	3	6	3
(France) A Cocheteux	6	4	6
(Belarus) N Zvereva	2	4
(United States) A Frazier	6	6
(Romania) R Dragomir	0	2
2	(United States) L Davenport	6	6

Third round
9	(France) J Halard-Decugis	5
(France) A Cocheteux	2	r
(United States) A Frazier	1	1
2	(United States) L Davenport	6	6

Fourth round
9	(France) J Halard-Decugis	1	2
2	(United States) L Davenport	6	6

== Qualifying draw ==
Preceded by 1999 Wimbledon Championships – Women's singles	Grand Slam women's singles	Succeeded by 2000 Australian Open – Women's singles
