= 1999 US Open – Women's doubles =

Women's doubles
- 1999 US Open

Final
- Champions: (United States) Serena Williams (United States) Venus Williams
- Runners-up: (United States) Chanda Rubin (France) Sandrine Testud
- Score: 4–6, 6–1, 6–4

Details
- Draw: 64 (4 Q / 6 WC )
- Seeds: 16

Events
Singles	men	women		boys	girls
Doubles	men	women	mixed	boys	girls
WC Singles	men	women	quad
WC Doubles	men	women	quad
Legends	men	women	mixed
← 1998 ·	US Open	· 2000 →

Serena and Venus Williams defeated Chanda Rubin and Sandrine Testud in the final, 4–6, 6–1, 6–4 to win the women's doubles tennis title at the 1999 US Open. It was the second doubles major title for the Williams sisters, and their second step towards completing the career Golden Slam in doubles.

Martina Hingis and Jana Novotná were the defending champions, but Hingis did not compete this year. Novotná teamed up with Natasha Zvereva, but they lost in the third round to Liezel Horn and Kimberly Po.

== Seeds ==
1. (Czech Republic) Jana Novotná / (Belarus) Natasha Zvereva (third round)
2. (France) Alexandra Fusai / (France) Nathalie Tauziat (third round)
3. (United States) Lindsay Davenport / (United States) Corina Morariu (quarterfinals)
4. (Russia) Elena Likhovtseva / (Japan) Ai Sugiyama (first round)
5. (United States) Serena Williams / (United States) Venus Williams (champions)
6. (Latvia) Larisa Neiland / (Spain) Arantxa Sánchez Vicario (semifinals)
7. (United States) Lisa Raymond / (Australia) Rennae Stubbs (third round)
8. (South Africa) Mariaan de Swardt / (Ukraine) Elena Tatarkova (first round)
9. (Romania) Irina Spîrlea / (Netherlands) Caroline Vis (first round)
10. (United States) Mary Joe Fernández / (United States) Monica Seles (quarterfinals)
11. (Spain) Conchita Martínez / (Argentina) Patricia Tarabini (third round)
12. (France) Mary Pierce / (Austria) Barbara Schett (semifinals)
13. (Spain) Virginia Ruano Pascual / (Argentina) Paola Suárez (second round)
14. (Zimbabwe) Cara Black / (Kazakhstan) Irina Selyutina (first round)
15. (United States) Nicole Arendt / (Netherlands) Manon Bollegraf (quarterfinals)
16. (South Africa) Liezel Horn / (United States) Kimberly Po (quarterfinals)

== Draw ==
=== Key ===
- Q = Qualifier
- WC = Wild card
- LL = Lucky loser
- Alt = Alternate
- ITF = ITF entry
- PR = Protected ranking
- SR = Special ranking
- SE = Special exempt
- JE = Junior exempt
- JR = Junior Accelerator Programme entrant
- CO = College Accelerator Programme entrant
- NG = Next Gen Accelerator Program entrant
- w/o = Walkover
- r = Retired
- d = Defaulted

=== Finals ===
Quarterfinals
16	(South Africa) Liezel Horn (United States) Kimberly Po	6	1	4
6	(Latvia) Larisa Neiland (Spain) Arantxa Sánchez Vicario	1	6	6
3	(United States) Lindsay Davenport (United States) Corina Morariu	6	2	5
(United States) Chanda Rubin (France) Sandrine Testud	3	6	7
5	(United States) Serena Williams (United States) Venus Williams	6	6
10	(United States) Mary Joe Fernández (United States) Monica Seles	3	3
12	(France) Mary Pierce (Austria) Barbara Schett	5
15	(United States) Nicole Arendt (Netherlands) Manon Bollegraf	2^{r}

Semifinals
6	(Latvia) Larisa Neiland (Spain) Arantxa Sánchez Vicario	6	5
(United States) Chanda Rubin (France) Sandrine Testud	7	7
5	(United States) Serena Williams (United States) Venus Williams	7	6
12	(France) Mary Pierce (Austria) Barbara Schett	6	3

Final
(United States) Chanda Rubin (France) Sandrine Testud	6	1	4
5	(United States) Serena Williams (United States) Venus Williams	4	6	6

=== Top half ===
==== Section 1 ====
First round
1	(Czech Republic) J Novotná (Belarus) N Zvereva	4	6	6
Q	(United States) S Cacic (Canada) M Drake	6	0	4
(Argentina) F Labat (Belgium) D Van Roost	6	6	6
(Australia) A Ellwood (Japan) R Hiraki	3	7	3
WC	(United States) K Brandi (United States) M Tu	3	2
(United States) A Frazier (United States) K Schlukebir	6	6
WC	(United States) T Brymer (United States) A Spears	1	2
16	(South Africa) L Horn (United States) K Po	6	6
9	(Romania) I Spîrlea (Netherlands) C Vis	3	3
(Italy) S Farina (Slovakia) K Habšudová	6	6
(Italy) L Golarsa (United States) M Shaughnessy	2	6	6
(United States) K Adams (United States) M Washington	6	4	3
(Hungary) K Marosi (Chinese Taipei) Wang S-t	3	2
(Belgium) L Courtois (Australia) A Molik	6	6
(Czech Republic) E Martincová (Czech Republic) H Vildová	1	2
6	(Latvia) L Neiland (Spain) A Sánchez Vicario	6	6

Second round
1	(Czech Republic) J Novotná (Belarus) N Zvereva	6	6
(Argentina) F Labat (Belgium) D Van Roost	1	4
(United States) A Frazier (United States) K Schlukebir	5	0
16	(South Africa) L Horn (United States) K Po	7	6
(Italy) S Farina (Slovakia) K Habšudová	6	6
(Italy) L Golarsa (United States) M Shaughnessy	1	1
(Belgium) L Courtois (Australia) A Molik	6	5	6
6	(Latvia) L Neiland (Spain) A Sánchez Vicario	3	7	7

Third round
1	(Czech Republic) J Novotná (Belarus) N Zvereva	3	6	0
16	(South Africa) L Horn (United States) K Po	6	4	6
(Italy) S Farina (Slovakia) K Habšudová	4	3
6	(Latvia) L Neiland (Spain) A Sánchez Vicario	6	6

Quarterfinals
16	(South Africa) L Horn (United States) K Po	6	1	4
6	(Latvia) L Neiland (Spain) A Sánchez Vicario	1	6	6

==== Section 2 ====
First round
3	(United States) L Davenport (United States) C Morariu	6	6
(Spain) E Bes-Ostariz (Spain) G Riera-Roura	0	2
(United States) E deLone (Australia) N Pratt	7	4	6
(South Africa) E de Villiers (South Africa) J Steck	6	6	3
(Poland) A Olsza (United States) L Osterloh	7	4	6
(Czech Republic) L Němečková (Slovakia) R Zrubáková	6	6	2
(Ukraine) O Lugina (Argentina) L Montalvo	6	2	2
11	(Spain) C Martínez (Argentina) P Tarabini	4	6	6
14	(Zimbabwe) C Black (Kazakhstan) I Selyutina	1	6	4
(Australia) K-A Guse (Australia) K Kunce	6	3	6
WC	(United States) B Rippner (United States) T Snyder	1	3
(United States) C Rubin (France) S Testud	6	6
(Czech Republic) K Hrdličková (Germany) B Rittner	6	6
WC	(United States) A Augustus (Australia) A Jensen	3	3
(France) C Dhenin (Czech Republic) E Melicharová	1	2
7	(United States) L Raymond (Australia) R Stubbs	6	6

Second round
3	(United States) L Davenport (United States) C Morariu	6	6
(United States) E deLone (Australia) N Pratt	0	2
(Poland) A Olsza (United States) L Osterloh	1	4
11	(Spain) C Martínez (Argentina) P Tarabini	6	6
(Australia) K-A Guse (Australia) K Kunce	4	2
(United States) C Rubin (France) S Testud	6	6
(Czech Republic) K Hrdličková (Germany) B Rittner	2	2
7	(United States) L Raymond (Australia) R Stubbs	6	6

Third round
3	(United States) L Davenport (United States) C Morariu	6	6
11	(Spain) C Martínez (Argentina) P Tarabini	2	3
(United States) C Rubin (France) S Testud	6	6
7	(United States) L Raymond (Australia) R Stubbs	1	3

Quarterfinals
3	(United States) L Davenport (United States) C Morariu	6	2	5
(United States) C Rubin (France) S Testud	3	6	7

=== Bottom half ===
==== Section 3 ====
First round
5	(United States) S Williams (United States) V Williams	6	6
(Japan) M Saeki (Japan) Y Yoshida	2	3
(Belgium) E Callens (United States) D Graham	2	7	5
(South Africa) A Coetzer (Argentina) I Gorrochategui	6	5	7
(Japan) N Miyagi (United States) L Wild	6	4	6
(Belgium) S Appelmans (Netherlands) M Oremans	1	6	2
Q	(United States) L Lee (Canada) V Webb	6	5	5
13	(Spain) V Ruano Pascual (Argentina) P Suárez	1	7	7
10	(United States) MJ Fernandez (United States) M Seles	6	7
(Sweden) Å Carlsson (Canada) S Jeyaseelan	2	5
(Australia) R McQuillan (Australia) L McShea	4	4
(France) A Dechaume-Balleret (France) É Loit	6	6
Q	(Croatia) J Kostanić (Belarus) T Poutchek	3	6
Q	(Bulgaria) S Krivencheva (Croatia) M Murić	6	7
(Netherlands) S Noorlander (Austria) P Wartusch	1	6	6
4	(Russia) E Likhovtseva (Japan) A Sugiyama	6	3	3

Second round
5	(United States) S Williams (United States) V Williams	6	6	6
(South Africa) A Coetzer (Argentina) I Gorrochategui	7	4	4
(Japan) N Miyagi (United States) L Wild	7	7
13	(Spain) V Ruano Pascual (Argentina) P Suárez	5	6
10	(United States) MJ Fernandez (United States) M Seles	7	6
(France) A Dechaume-Balleret (France) É Loit	5	4
Q	(Bulgaria) S Krivencheva (Croatia) M Murić	0	7	6
(Netherlands) S Noorlander (Austria) P Wartusch	6	5	4

Third round
5	(United States) S Williams (United States) V Williams	6	6
(Japan) N Miyagi (United States) L Wild	4	1
10	(United States) MJ Fernandez (United States) M Seles	7	7
Q	(Bulgaria) S Krivencheva (Croatia) M Murić	5	6

Quarterfinals
5	(United States) S Williams (United States) V Williams	6	6
10	(United States) MJ Fernandez (United States) M Seles	3	3

==== Section 4 ====
First round
8	(South Africa) M de Swardt (Ukraine) E Tatarkova	6	5	4
(France) J Halard-Decugis (France) A Mauresmo	4	7	6
WC	(United States) J Capriati (Croatia) M Lučić	7	6	6
(Romania) C Cristea (Romania) R Dragomir	6	7	7
(Germany) A Huber (France) A-G Sidot	6	6
(France) A Cocheteux (Switzerland) P Schnyder	4	4
(Brazil) V Menga (Germany) E Wagner	3	7	4
12	(France) M Pierce (Austria) B Schett	6	5	6
15	(United States) N Arendt (Netherlands) M Bollegraf	6	6
(Australia) J Dokić (Slovenia) T Pisnik	2	1
(Australia) C Barclay (Italy) R Grande	1	6
WC	(United States) L McNeil (United States) A Stevenson	6	7
(Slovenia) T Križan (Slovenia) K Srebotnik	6	6
(Spain) A Ortuño (Spain) C Torrens Valero	3	0
(Greece) C Papadáki (Australia) L Pleming	3	6	0
2	(France) A Fusai (France) N Tauziat	6	4	6

Second round
(France) J Halard-Decugis (France) A Mauresmo	4	6	7
(Romania) C Cristea (Romania) R Dragomir	6	4	6
(Germany) A Huber (France) A-G Sidot	2	5
12	(France) M Pierce (Austria) B Schett	6	7
15	(United States) N Arendt (Netherlands) M Bollegraf	6	6
(United States) L McNeil (United States) A Stevenson	4	4
(Slovenia) T Križan (Slovenia) K Srebotnik	3	3
2	(France) A Fusai (France) N Tauziat	6	6

Third round
(France) J Halard-Decugis (France) A Mauresmo	2	2
12	(France) M Pierce (Austria) B Schett	6	6
15	(United States) N Arendt (Netherlands) M Bollegraf	6	6	6
2	(France) A Fusai (France) N Tauziat	2	7	3

Quarterfinals
12	(France) M Pierce (Austria) B Schett	5
15	(United States) N Arendt (Netherlands) M Bollegraf	2^{r}
