= 1999 US Open – Mixed doubles =

Mixed doubles
- 1999 US Open

Final
- Champions: (Japan) Ai Sugiyama (India) Mahesh Bhupathi
- Runners-up: (United States) Kimberly Po (United States) Donald Johnson
- Score: 6–4, 6–4

Details
- Draw: 32
- Seeds: 8

Events
Singles	men	women		boys	girls
Doubles	men	women	mixed	boys	girls
WC Singles	men	women	quad
WC Doubles	men	women	quad
Legends	men	women	mixed
- US Open

The 1999 US Open mixed doubles was the mixed doubles event of the hundred-and-ninth edition of the US Open, the fourth and last Grand Slam of the year. Serena Williams and Max Mirnyi were the defending champions but did not compete that year.

Ai Sugiyama and Mahesh Bhupathi won in the final against unseeded Americans Kimberly Po and Donald Johnson, 6–4, 6–4.

== Seeds ==
1. (United States) Lisa Raymond / (India) Leander Paes (second round)
2. (Japan) Ai Sugiyama / (India) Mahesh Bhupathi (champions)
3. (Australia) Rennae Stubbs / (Australia) Todd Woodbridge (semifinals)
4. (United States) Corina Morariu / (United States) Jared Palmer (second round)
5. (Russia) Elena Likhovtseva / (The Bahamas) Mark Knowles (first round)
6. n/a
7. (Latvia) Larisa Neiland / (United States) Rick Leach (quarterfinals)
8. (France) Mary Pierce / (South Africa) John-Laffnie de Jager (quarterfinals)

== Draw ==
Key

- Q = Qualifier
- WC = Wild card
- LL = Lucky loser
- Alt = Alternate
- ITF = ITF entry
- PR = Protected ranking
- SR = Special ranking
- SE = Special exempt
- JE = Junior exempt
- JR = Junior Accelerator Programme entrant
- CO = College Accelerator Programme entrant
- NG = Next Gen Accelerator Program entrant
- w/o = Walkover
- r = Retired
- d = Defaulted

=== Final ===
Semifinals
(United States) Kimberly Po (United States) Donald Johnson	6	6
3	(Australia) Rennae Stubbs (Australia) Todd Woodbridge	4	4
WC	(United States) Alexandra Stevenson (United States) Brian MacPhie	4	5
2	(Japan) Ai Sugiyama (India) Mahesh Bhupathi	6	7

Final
(United States) Kimberly Po (United States) Donald Johnson	4	4
2	(Japan) Ai Sugiyama (India) Mahesh Bhupathi	6	6

=== Top half ===
First round
1	(United States) L Raymond (India) L Paes	7	7
(South Africa) L Horn (Zimbabwe) K Ullyett	5	5
(United States) K Po (United States) D Johnson	3	6	6
(Kazakhstan) I Selyutina (Czech Republic) C Suk	6	3	4
(Argentina) P Tarabini (Spain) T Carbonell	2	3
(Romania) I Spîrlea (Argentina) D Orsanic	6	6
(United States) D Graham (Australia) S Stolle	6^{8}	6^{7}
7	(Latvia) L Neiland (United States) R Leach	7^{10}	7^{9}
3	(Australia) R Stubbs (Australia) T Woodbridge	6	3	6
(Slovakia) K Habšudová (Czech Republic) J Novák	3	6	2
(Australia) K Kunce (South Africa) E Ferreira	7^{7}	6
(Netherlands) C Vis (Czech Republic) D Rikl	6^{5}	3
(Ukraine) E Tatarkova (Russia) A Olhovskiy	6	6
(Slovenia) K Srebotnik (South Africa) P Norval	4	3
(Netherlands) M Bollegraf (Argentina) P Albano	7^{7}	4	5
Alt	(Australia) K-A Guse (United States) J Waite	6^{5}	6	7

Second round
1	(United States) L Raymond (India) L Paes	6	3	4
(United States) K Po (United States) D Johnson	4	6	6
(Romania) I Spîrlea (Argentina) D Orsanic	4	3
7	(Latvia) L Neiland (United States) R Leach	6	6
3	(Australia) R Stubbs (Australia) T Woodbridge	6	7^{7}
(Australia) K Kunce (South Africa) E Ferreira	3	6^{5}
(Ukraine) E Tatarkova (Russia) A Olhovskiy	6	6
Alt	(Australia) K-A Guse (United States) J Waite	4	2

Quarterfinals
(United States) K Po (United States) D Johnson	6	6
7	(Latvia) L Neiland (United States) R Leach	2	4
3	(Australia) R Stubbs (Australia) T Woodbridge	6	6
(Ukraine) E Tatarkova (Russia) A Olhovskiy	3	1

Semifinals
(United States) K Po (United States) D Johnson	6	6
3	(Australia) R Stubbs (Australia) T Woodbridge	4	4

=== Bottom half ===
First round
5	(Russia) E Likhovtseva (The Bahamas) M Knowles	2	3
WC	(United States) A Stevenson (United States) B MacPhie	6	6
(Zimbabwe) C Black (South Africa) R Koenig	6	6
(Slovenia) T Križan (Australia) A Kratzmann	1	4
WC	(United States) L Osterloh (United States) S Humphries	4	6	6
(France) A-G Sidot (France) O Delaître	6	3	2
WC	(United States) T Snyder (United States) C Mamiit	2	2
4	(United States) C Morariu (United States) J Palmer	6	6
8	(France) M Pierce (South Africa) J-L de Jager	6	7
(United States) L Wild (Australia) D Macpherson	3	5
(Argentina) F Labat (South Africa) C Haggard	3	6	6
(Argentina) P Suárez (Australia) W Arthurs	6	3	4
(Australia) R McQuillan (Australia) A Florent	6	6
WC	(United States) K Schlukebir (United States) M Bryan	2	4
(France) A Fusai (Czech Republic) M Damm	2	5
2	(Japan) A Sugiyama (India) M Bhupathi	6	7

Second round
WC	(United States) A Stevenson (United States) B MacPhie	7^{10}	6
(Zimbabwe) C Black (South Africa) R Koenig	6^{8}	1
WC	(United States) L Osterloh (United States) S Humphries	6	3	6
4	(United States) C Morariu (United States) J Palmer	3	6	1
8	(France) M Pierce (South Africa) J-L de Jager	7	7^{7}
(Argentina) F Labat (South Africa) C Haggard	5	6^{0}
(Australia) R McQuillan (Australia) A Florent	1	r
2	(Japan) A Sugiyama (India) M Bhupathi	4

Quarterfinals
WC	(United States) A Stevenson (United States) B MacPhie	6	6
WC	(United States) L Osterloh (United States) S Humphries	2	4
8	(France) M Pierce (South Africa) J-L de Jager	6	4	2
2	(Japan) A Sugiyama (India) M Bhupathi	4	6	6

Semifinals
WC	(United States) A Stevenson (United States) B MacPhie	4	5
2	(Japan) A Sugiyama (India) M Bhupathi	6	7
