= Tres Davis =

American tennis player

- Full name: Tres Davis
- Country (sports): United States
- Born: January 13, 1982 (age 44) Lubbock, Texas, U.S.
- Height: 5 ft 11 in (180 cm)
- Turned pro: 2002
- Retired: 2006
- Plays: Right-handed
- Prize money: $38,296

Singles
- Career record: 0-0
- Career titles: 0; 0 Challenger, 1 Futures
- Highest ranking: No. 404 (1 August 2005)

Doubles
- Career record: 1-2
- Career titles: 0; 0 Challenger, 9 Futures
- Highest ranking: No. 259 (15 August 2005)

Grand Slam doubles results
- US Open: 1R (2000)
- Last updated on: 24 December 2021.

Tres Davis (born January 13, 1982) is a former professional tennis player from the United States.

== Biography ==
Originally from Lubbock, Texas, Davis is the eldest of three brothers and was coached by his father Doug.

=== Tennis career ===
Most noted for his junior career, he was a Junior Davis Cup representative for the United States and a boys' doubles finalist at three grand slam tournaments. In all three finals he finished runner-up, at the 1999 US Open with Alberto Francis, 2000 Australian Open with Andy Roddick and 2000 US Open with Robby Ginepri. He also competed in the men's doubles draw with Ginepri at the 2000 US Open, where they lost a three set first round match to Argentines Pablo Albano and Lucas Arnold Ker.

After winning the Big 12 Conference Championship title with Texas A&M, Davis turned professional in 2002. He competed mostly in satellite tournaments and on the Challenger Tour. His only main draw appearance on the ATP Tour came at the 2005 U.S. Men's Clay Court Championships in Houston, where he formed a wildcard pairing with Andy Roddick, who would win the singles title. The pair made the doubles quarter-finals, by beating James Blake and Mardy Fish. He retired in 2006.

=== Life after tennis ===
Davis is the former travelling coach of Ryan Harrison and now runs a cleaning and restoration business with his wife Paige in the Greater Austin area.

== Junior Grand Slam finals ==
=== Doubles: 3 (3 runner-ups) ===
Result	Year	Tournament	Surface	Partner	Opponents	Score
Loss	1999	US Open	Hard	(United States) Alberto Francis	(France) Julien Benneteau (France) Nicolas Mahut	4–6, 6–3, 1–6
Loss	2000	Australian Open	Hard	(United States) Andy Roddick	(Spain) Tommy Robredo (France) Nicolas Mahut	2–6, 7–5, 9–11
Loss	2000	US Open	Hard	(United States) Robby Ginepri	(United Kingdom) Lee Childs (United Kingdom) James Nelson	2–6, 4–6

== ATP Challenger and ITF Futures Finals ==
=== Singles: 5 (1–4) ===
Legend ATP Challenger (0–0) ITF Futures (1–4)	Finals by surface Hard (1–3) Clay (0–1) Grass (0–0) Carpet (0–0)

Result	W–L	Date	Tournament	Tier	Surface	Opponent	Score
Loss	0–1	Apr 2002	Jamaica F2, Montego Bay	Futures	Hard	(Colombia) Michael Quintero Aguilar	3–6, 6–2, 4–6
Win	1–1	May 2004	Mexico F6, Celaya	Futures	Hard	(Chile) Juan-Ignacio Cerda	6–3, 6–1
Loss	1–2	Aug 2004	USA F21, Godfrey	Futures	Hard	(Brazil) Rodrigo-Antonio Grilli	6–4, 6–7^{(3–7)}, 4–6
Loss	1–3	Aug 2004	USA F22, Decatur	Futures	Hard	(United States) Sam Warburg	4–6, 2–6
Loss	1–4	May 2005	Morocco F3, Agadir	Futures	Clay	(Algeria) Lamine Ouahab	1–6, 2–6

=== Doubles: 12 (9–3) ===
Legend ATP Challenger (0–0) ITF Futures (9–3)	Finals by surface Hard (7–1) Clay (2–2) Grass (0–0) Carpet (0–0)

Result	W–L	Date	Tournament	Tier	Surface	Partner	Opponents	Score
Win	1–0	Feb 2002	USA F4, Brownsville	Futures	Hard	(United States) Graydon Oliver	(North Macedonia) Lazar Magdinchev (United States) Jeff Williams	3–6, 7–6^{(7–4)}, 6–2
Win	2–0	Apr 2002	Jamaica F1, Kingston	Futures	Hard	(Canada) Philip Gubenco	(United States) Cary Franklin (United States) Alex Bogomolov Jr.	4–6, 6–3, 7–6^{(7–1)}
Win	3–0	Apr 2002	Jamaica F2, Montego Bay	Futures	Hard	(Canada) Philip Gubenco	(France) Nicolas Devilder (France) Thierry Guardiola	6–1, 4–6, 6–3
Win	4–0	Feb 2004	USA F4, Brownsville	Futures	Hard	(United States) Eric Nunez	(United States) Clancy Shields (United States) Luke Shields	6–3, 6–3
Win	5–0	Jul 2004	USA F18, Pittsburgh	Futures	Clay	(United States) Ryan Sachire	(United States) Goran Dragicevic (United States) Mirko Pehar	6–3, 6–4
Loss	5–1	Feb 2005	USA F4, Brownsville	Futures	Hard	(United States) Eric Nunez	(United States) Lester Cook (Canada) Robert Steckley	walkover
Win	6–1	Apr 2005	USA F7, Little Rock	Futures	Hard	(United States) Scott Lipsky	(United States) Michael Johnson (United States) Nikita Kryvonos	6–3, 1–6, 6–3
Win	7–1	May 2005	Morocco F3, Agadir	Futures	Clay	(Brazil) Marcio Torres	(Portugal) Frederico Marques (Czech Republic) Adam Vejmelka	6–2, 6–3
Win	8–1	Jun 2005	Spain F11, Tenerife	Futures	Hard	(Netherlands Antilles) Jean-Julien Rojer	(Spain) German Puentes-Alcaniz (Venezuela) Daniel Vallverdu	6–2, 6–4
Loss	8–2	Jul 2005	USA F15, Buffalo	Futures	Clay	(United States) Nicholas Monroe	(United States) Treat Huey (South Africa) Izak Van Der Merwe	3–6, 4–6
Loss	8–3	Jul 2005	USA F16, Pittsburgh	Futures	Clay	(Romania) Catalin-Ionut Gard	(Australia) Robert Smeets (Australia) Daniel Wendler	walkover
Win	9–3	Aug 2005	USA F20, Decatur	Futures	Hard	(United States) Brandon Davis	(Australia) Sadik Kadir (Australia) Daniel Wendler	6–4, 7–6^{(7–4)}
