= Timothy Martin =

Footballer

Personal information
- Full name: Timothy Serge Martin
- Date of birth: 6 February 2001 (age 25)
- Place of birth: Arlon, Luxembourg, Belgium
- Height: 1.90 m (6 ft 3 in)
- Position: Goalkeeper

Team information
- Current team: Cobh Ramblers
- Number: 42

Youth career
- 2017–2020: AA Gent

Senior career*
| Years | Team | Apps | (Gls) |
| 2020–2021 | Nîmes B | 0 | (0) |
| 2021–2025 | Virton | 23 | (0) |
| 2022–2023 | → Seraing (loan) | 4 | (0) |
| 2025– | Cobh Ramblers | 51 | (0) |

International career
| 2021–2022 | Luxembourg U21 | 4 | (0) |
- * Club domestic league appearances and goals as of 6 June 2026

Timothy Serge Martin (born 27 March 2001) is a footballer who plays as a goalkeeper for Cobh Ramblers. Born in Belgium, he is a Luxembourgish youth international.

== Career ==
In 2020, Martin signed for French fifth tier side Nîmes B. In 2021, he signed for Virton in the Belgian second tier. On 19 December 2021, he debuted for Virton during a 1–1 draw with Westerlo.

On 11 August 2022, Martin joined Seraing on a season-long loan with an option to buy.

On 31 January 2025, Martin signed for League of Ireland First Division club Cobh Ramblers. On 19 May 2025, he was part of the side that won the Munster Senior Cup following a 2–0 win over Rockmount at Turners Cross.
