= Levar Harper-Griffith =

American tennis player

- Country (sports): United States
- Residence: Sarasota, Florida
- Born: September 4, 1981 (age 44) New York
- Plays: Right-handed
- Prize money: $96,179

Singles
- Career record: 0–2
- Career titles: 0
- Highest ranking: No. 224 (17 September 2001)

Grand Slam singles results
- US Open: 1R (2001)

Doubles
- Career record: 3–4
- Career titles: 0
- Highest ranking: No. 184 (27 January 2003)

Grand Slam doubles results
- US Open: 2R (1999, 2002)

Levar Harper-Griffith (born September 4, 1981) is a former professional tennis player from the United States.

== Career ==
=== Juniors ===
Harper-Griffith was a boys' singles quarter-finalist at the 1999 Australian Open and a boys' doubles semi-finalist (with Andy Roddick) at the 1999 US Open.

=== Pro tour ===
On top of their semifinal run in the juniors, Harper-Griffith also competed with Roddick in the men's doubles draw at the 1999 US Open, making the second round. At the 2001 US Open, Harper-Griffith lost to Spaniard Albert Costa in the opening round of the men's singles. It would be his only appearance in the men's singles draw of a Grand Slam but he did make another US Open doubles appearance, in 2002, with Eric Taino. The pair defeated Dominik Hrbatý and André Sá in the first round, before being eliminated in the second round by Jiří Novák and Radek Štěpánek.

== Challenger titles ==
=== Singles: (1) ===
No.	Year	Tournament	Surface	Opponent in the final	Score in the final
1.	2001	Tarzana, United States	Hard	(United States) Michael Joyce	7–6^{(6)}, 6–3

=== Doubles: (1) ===
No.	Year	Tournament	Surface	Partner	Opponents in the final	Score in the final
1.	2002	Tallahassee, United States	Hard	(United States) Jeff Williams	(United States) Huntley Montgomery (United States) Brian Vahaly	6–3, 4–6, 6–4
