= Melissa Dowse =

Australian tennis player

- Country (sports): Australia
- Born: 27 April 1982 (age 44)
- Plays: Right-handed
- Prize money: $42,448

Singles
- Career record: 84–75
- Highest ranking: No. 247 (2 April 2001)

Grand Slam singles results
- Australian Open: 2R (2001)

Doubles
- Career record: 65–53
- Career titles: 0 WTA / 4 ITF
- Highest ranking: No. 349 (8 October 2001)

Melissa Dowse (born 27 April 1982) is a former professional tennis player from Australia.

== Biography ==
Dowse, who grew up in Gosford, was a top 20 ranked junior and represented Australia at the 1998 World Youth Cup held in Italy.

A right-handed player, Dowse is most noted for appearing twice in the singles main draw of the Australian Open. In the 2000 Australian Open she received a wildcard and faced German qualifier Jana Kandarr in a first round match she lost 6–8 in the third set, having held a match point. She returned for the 2001 Australian Open as another wildcard entrant and this time won her first round match over Alexandra Fusai in three sets, the last of which she claimed 6–0. In the second round she was easily defeated by Silvia Farina Elia.

In 2001 she won three ITF doubles titles over the course of a month in Japan partnering with Samantha Stosur.

== ITF Circuit finals ==
=== Doubles (4–2) ===
Result	No.	Date	Tournament	Surface	Partner	Opponents	Score
Loss	1.	9 September 2001	Kugayama, Japan	Hard	(Australia) Samantha Stosur	(Japan) Seiko Okamoto (Japan) Nami Urabe	4–6, 6–2, 1–6
Win	1.	16 September 2001	Ibaraki, Japan	Hard	(Australia) Samantha Stosur	(Australia) Beti Sekulovski (Australia) Sarah Stone	6–4, 5–7, 6–2
Win	2.	23 September 2001	Osaka, Japan	Hard	(Australia) Samantha Stosur	(Australia) Beti Sekulovski (Australia) Sarah Stone	5–7, 6–3, 6–3
Win	3.	30 September 2001	Kyoto, Japan	Carpet	(Australia) Samantha Stosur	(Japan) Seiko Okamoto (Japan) Nami Urabe	6–3, 3–6, 6–2
Loss	2.	29 April 2002	Dubrovnik, Croatia	Clay	(Slovakia) Linda Smolenaková	(Czech Republic) Blanka Kumbárová (Czech Republic) Jana Macurová	6–1, 4–6, 4–6
Win	4.	19 May 2002	Casale, Italy	Clay	(Australia) Rochelle Rosenfield	(Argentina) Melisa Arévalo (Argentina) Erica Krauth	3–6, 7–6^{(5)}, 6–1
