= Lenka Dlhopolcová =

Slovak tennis player (born 1984)

- Country (sports): Slovakia
- Born: 14 July 1984 (age 40); Zvolen, Czechoslovakia
- Height: 1.69 m (5 ft 7 in)
- Turned pro: 1999
- Retired: 2005
- Prize money: $50,582

Singles
- Career record: 70–33
- Career titles: 3 ITF
- Highest ranking: No. 156 (4 February 2002)

Grand Slam singles results
- US Open: 1R (2001)

Doubles
- Career record: 21–17
- Highest ranking: No. 244 (18 February 2002)

Lenka Dlhopolcová (born 14 July 1984) is a Slovak former tennis player.

Dlhopolcová, who won three ITF singles titles in her career, reached a ranking high of world No. 156 on 4 February 2002.

She qualified for the first round of the 2001 US Open, but lost 2–6, 3–6 to the eventual champion Venus Williams.

== ITF finals ==
=== Singles (3–2) ===
Legend $25,000 tournaments $10,000 tournaments	Finals by surface Hard (2–0) Clay (1–2)

Result	No.	Date	Tournament	Surface	Opponent	Score
Win	1.	Nov 2000	New Delhi, India	Hard	(Russia) Olga Kalyuzhnaya	4–1, 1–4, 5–4^{4}, 4–2
Win	2.	May 2001	Sofia, Bulgaria	Clay	(Hungary) Eszter Molnár	6–3, 6–1
Loss	1.	Oct 2004	Dubrovnik, Croatia	Clay	(Croatia) Sanja Ančić	4–6, 2–6
Win	3.	Nov 2004	Ramat HaSharon, Israel	Hard	(Israel) Yevgenia Savransky	6–1, 6–7^{(6–8)}, 6–0
Loss	2.	May 2005	Balș, Romania	Clay	(Serbia and Montenegro) Andrea Popović	0–6, 6–7^{(4–7)}

=== Doubles (0–5) ===
Legend $25,000 tournaments $10,000 tournaments	Finals by surface Hard (0–1) Clay (0–4)

Outcome	No.	Date	Tournament	Surface	Partner	Opponents	Score
Runner-up	1.	10 March 2001	Hangzhou, China	Hard	(Japan) Remi Tezuka	(China) Li Na (China) Shen Lui-Li	3–6, 3–6
Runner-up	2.	26 May 2001	Sofia, Bulgaria	Clay	(Slovakia) Ľubomíra Kurhajcová	(Russia) Anna Bastrikova (Russia) Maria Goloviznina	3–6, 6–3, 2–6
Runner-up	3.	11 September 2004	Prešov, Slovakia	Clay	(Slovakia) Lenka Broosová	(Czech Republic) Lucie Kriegsmannová (Czech Republic) Zuzana Zálabská	2–6, 6–4, 1–6
Runner-up	4.	28 May 2005	Balș, Romania	Clay	(Romania) Alexandra Iacob	(Romania) Bianca Bonifate (Romania) Gabriela Niculescu	2–6, 5–7
Runner-up	5.	16 July 2005	Garching, Germany	Clay	(Germany) Laura Siegemund	(Czech Republic) Zuzana Hejdová (Austria) Eva-Maria Hoch	6–4, 4–6, 3–6
