= 1999 US Open (tennis) =

- Date: August 30 – September 12
- Edition: 119th
- Category: Grand Slam (ITF)
- Surface: Hardcourt
- Location: New York City, New York, United States

Champions

Men's singles
- (United States) Andre Agassi

Women's singles
- (United States) Serena Williams

Men's doubles
- (Canada) Sébastien Lareau / (United States) Alex O'Brien

Women's doubles
- (United States) Serena Williams / (United States) Venus Williams

Mixed doubles
- (Japan) Ai Sugiyama / (India) Mahesh Bhupathi

Boys' singles
- (Finland) Jarkko Nieminen

Girls' singles
- (Russia) Lina Krasnoroutskaya

Boys' doubles
- (France) Julien Benneteau / (France) Nicolas Mahut

Girls' doubles
- (Czech Republic) Dája Bedáňová / (Uzbekistan) Iroda Tulyaganova
| ← 1998 · | US Open | · 2000 → |

The 1999 US Open was a tennis tournament played on outdoor hard courts at the USTA National Tennis Center in New York City in New York in the United States. It was the 119th edition of the US Open and was held from August 30 through September 12, 1999.

== Singles players ==
Men's singles

| Champion | | Runner-up | |
|---|---|---|---|
| (United States) Andre Agassi [2] | | (United States) Todd Martin [7] | |
Semifinals out
| (France) Cédric Pioline | | (Russia) Yevgeny Kafelnikov [3] | |
Quarterfinals out
| (Czech Republic) Slava Doseděl | (Brazil) Gustavo Kuerten [5] | (Netherlands) Richard Krajicek [12] | (France) Nicolas Escudé (Q) |
4th round out
| (Czech Republic) Jiří Novák | (United Kingdom) Greg Rusedski [9] | (Germany) Tommy Haas [14] | (Sweden) Magnus Norman |
| (United States) Vincent Spadea | (Ukraine) Andrei Medvedev | (Chile) Marcelo Ríos [10] | (France) Arnaud Clément |
3rd round out
| (France) Fabrice Santoro | (Sweden) Fredrik Jonsson (Q) | (United States) Chris Woodruff | (Sweden) Magnus Larsson |
| (Netherlands) Peter Wessels (Q) | (Morocco) Hicham Arazi | (Australia) Richard Fromberg | (Croatia) Goran Ivanišević |
| (Italy) Laurence Tieleman (LL) | (Netherlands) John van Lottum | (Australia) Lleyton Hewitt | (Sweden) Jonas Björkman |
| (Belgium) Xavier Malisse (Q) | (Slovakia) Ján Krošlák | (Germany) Nicolas Kiefer [15] | (United States) Justin Gimelstob |
2nd round out
| (Russia) Marat Safin | (United States) Jan-Michael Gambill | (Brazil) Fernando Meligeni | (Ecuador) Nicolás Lapentti [16] |
| (Germany) David Prinosil | (Norway) Christian Ruud | (Morocco) Younes El Aynaoui | (United States) Richey Reneberg (WC) |
| (Germany) Lars Burgsmüller (Q) | (Australia) Mark Woodforde | (Spain) Fernando Vicente | (Argentina) Mariano Puerta |
| (Italy) Gianluca Pozzi | (Austria) Markus Hipfl | (Italy) Cristiano Caratti (Q) | (Netherlands) Paul Haarhuis |
| (Argentina) Guillermo Cañas | (Spain) Galo Blanco | (Croatia) Ivan Ljubičić (LL) | (Switzerland) Lorenzo Manta (Q) |
| (Australia) Wayne Arthurs | (Canada) Sébastien Lareau | (Denmark) Kenneth Carlsen | (Belarus) Max Mirnyi (LL) |
| (Spain) Carlos Moyá [8] | (United States) Cecil Mamiit | (United States) Paul Goldstein | (Switzerland) George Bastl (Q) |
| (Germany) Michael Kohlmann (Q) | (United States) Michael Chang | (Czech Republic) Daniel Vacek | (Germany) Axel Pretzsch (Q) |
1st round out
| (Sweden) Mikael Tillström (LL) | (Paraguay) Ramón Delgado | (Austria) Stefan Koubek | (France) Sébastien Grosjean |
| (United States) Jim Courier | (United States) Kevin Kim (WC) | (France) Arnaud di Pasquale | (Spain) Francisco Clavet |
| (Spain) Juan Carlos Ferrero | (Costa Rica) Juan Antonio Marín | (United States) James Blake (WC) | (Germany) Rainer Schüttler |
| (United States) Bob Bryan (WC) | (Zimbabwe) Byron Black | (Armenia) Sargis Sargsian | (France) Stephane Huet (Q) |
| (Australia) Patrick Rafter [4] | (Netherlands) Jan Siemerink | (Spain) Albert Portas | (Argentina) Mariano Zabaleta |
| (Morocco) Karim Alami | (Spain) German Puentes | (Germany) Bernd Karbacher | (Sweden) Thomas Enqvist |
| (Spain) Félix Mantilla [17] | (Canada) Daniel Nestor | (Australia) Andrew Ilie | (South Africa) Wayne Ferreira |
| (Spain) Jacobo Díaz | (Finland) Ville Liukko (Q) | (Germany) Hendrik Dreekmann | (Czech Republic) Bohdan Ulihrach |
| (United Kingdom) Tim Henman [6] | (Germany) Jens Knippschild | (France) Julien Boutter (Q) | (United States) Taylor Dent (WC) |
| (Japan) Takao Suzuki (Q) | (United States) Jeff Morrison (WC) | (Netherlands) Sjeng Schalken | (United States) Phillip King (WC) |
| (Spain) Àlex Corretja [13] | (Switzerland) Marc Rosset | (Argentina) Martín Rodríguez | (Argentina) Gastón Gaudio |
| (United States) Jeff Tarango | (Argentina) Hernán Gumy | (Czech Republic) Tomáš Zíb | (Spain) Alberto Martín |
| (Slovakia) Dominik Hrbatý | (Sweden) Magnus Gustafsson | (Switzerland) Ivo Heuberger (Q) | (France) Guillaume Raoux |
| (Australia) Scott Draper | (United States) Mashiska Washington (WC) | (Argentina) Franco Squillari | (Czech Republic) Martin Damm |
| (Australia) Jason Stoltenberg | (Romania) Andrei Pavel | (Uruguay) Marcelo Filippini | (Zimbabwe) Wayne Black |
| (Spain) Albert Costa | (Italy) Andrea Gaudenzi | (France) Cyril Saulnier (Q) | (Sweden) Nicklas Kulti |

Women's singles

| Champion | | Runner-up | |
|---|---|---|---|
| (United States) Serena Williams [7] | | (Switzerland) Martina Hingis [1] | |
Semifinals out
| (United States) Venus Williams [3] | | (United States) Lindsay Davenport [2] | |
Quarterfinals out
| (Germany) Anke Huber | (Austria) Barbara Schett [12] | (United States) Monica Seles [4] | (France) Mary Pierce [5] |
4th round out
| (Spain) Arantxa Sánchez Vicario [10] | (France) Amélie Mauresmo [15] | (United States) Mary Joe Fernández | (Russia) Elena Likhovtseva |
| (Spain) Conchita Martínez [16] | (United States) Jennifer Capriati | (Belgium) Sabine Appelmans | (France) Julie Halard-Decugis [9] |
3rd round out
| (Germany) Sandra Klösel (Q) | (Switzerland) Patty Schnyder | (United States) Tara Snyder | (Czech Republic) Jana Novotná [8] |
| (Slovakia) Henrieta Nagyová | (Belgium) Dominique Van Roost [13] | (Spain) Virginia Ruano Pascual | (Romania) Irina Spîrlea |
| (Belgium) Kim Clijsters | (Russia) Elena Dementieva | (France) Nathalie Tauziat [11] | (Japan) Ai Sugiyama |
| (Spain) Ángeles Montolio | (Spain) Magüi Serna | (France) Amélie Cocheteux | (United States) Amy Frazier |
2nd round out
| (France) Sarah Pitkowski | (United States) Jane Chi | (United States) Lisa Raymond | (Australia) Nicole Pratt |
| (South Africa) Mariaan de Swardt | (Croatia) Mirjana Lučić | (Luxembourg) Anne Kremer | (Slovenia) Tina Križan (Q) |
| (France) Anne-Gaëlle Sidot | (Poland) Magdalena Grzybowska (Q) | (Russia) Anastasia Myskina (Q) | (Italy) Rita Grande |
| (Sweden) Åsa Carlsson (Q) | (Netherlands) Amanda Hopmans | (Slovenia) Tina Pisnik (Q) | (Thailand) Tamarine Tanasugarn |
| (Croatia) Jelena Kostanić (Q) | (Czech Republic) Adriana Gerši (Q) | (Colombia) Fabiola Zuluaga | (France) Alexia Dechaume-Balleret |
| (Spain) María Sánchez Lorenzo | (Netherlands) Seda Noorlander | (Slovakia) Karina Habšudová | (Italy) Silvia Farina |
| (Spain) Gala León García | (Argentina) Paola Suárez | (United States) Samantha Reeves (WC) | (France) Sandrine Testud [14] |
| (China) Fang Li | (Austria) Sylvia Plischke | (Belarus) Natasha Zvereva | (Romania) Ruxandra Dragomir |
1st round out
| (Czech Republic) Květa Hrdličková | (United States) Jennifer Hopkins (WC) | (Czech Republic) Zuzana Lešenarová (WC) | (Czech Republic) Sandra Kleinová |
| (Spain) Cristina Torrens Valero | (France) Émilie Loit | (United States) Meilen Tu | (Australia) Jelena Dokic |
| (Belgium) Justine Henin | (United States) Kristina Brandi | (United States) Erika deLone (WC) | (Slovakia) Ľudmila Cervanová |
| (Croatia) Silvija Talaja | (United States) Jill Craybas (WC) | (United States) Meghann Shaughnessy | (Chinese Taipei) Shi-ting Wang |
| (Belarus) Tatiana Poutchek (Q) | (Belgium) Laurence Courtois | (Bulgaria) Lubomira Bacheva | (Canada) Jana Nejedly |
| (Australia) Lisa McShea (Q) | (Netherlands) Miriam Oremans | (Austria) Barbara Schwartz | (Canada) Maureen Drake |
| (United States) Tracy Singian (Q) | (Germany) Andrea Glass | (Germany) Elena Wagner | (Switzerland) Emmanuelle Gagliardi |
| (Romania) Cătălina Cristea (Q) | (Czech Republic) Denisa Chládková | (Russia) Tatiana Panova | (South Africa) Amanda Coetzer [6] |
| (United States) Kimberly Po | (United States) Mashona Washington (WC) | (France) Nathalie Dechy | (Germany) Anca Barna (Q) |
| (United States) Laura Granville (WC) | (Greece) Christína Papadáki | (Slovenia) Katarina Srebotnik | (United States) Chanda Rubin |
| (United States) Alexandra Stevenson | (Chinese Taipei) Janet Lee (Q) | (Croatia) Iva Majoli | (Italy) Laura Golarsa |
| (Czech Republic) Lenka Němečková | (Israel) Anna Smashnova | (Venezuela) María Vento (Q) | (Germany) Barbara Rittner |
| (Federal Republic of Yugoslavia) Sandra Načuk | (United States) Brie Rippner | (Belarus) Olga Barabanschikova | (United States) Melissa Middleton (WC) |
| (United States) Lilia Osterloh | (Germany) Jana Kandarr (Q) | (Belgium) Els Callens | (Germany) Marlene Weingärtner |
| (Zimbabwe) Cara Black | (Bulgaria) Pavlina Stoyanova | (Australia) Alicia Molik | (Ukraine) Elena Tatarkova |
| (Argentina) Inés Gorrochategui | (United States) Annie Miller | (Hungary) Rita Kuti-Kis | (United States) Corina Morariu |

== Seniors ==
=== Men's singles ===
(United States) Andre Agassi defeated (United States) Todd Martin, 6–4, 6–7^{(5–7)}, 6–7^{(2–7)}, 6–3, 6–2

• It was Agassi's 5th career Grand Slam singles title and his 2nd and last at the US Open.

=== Women's singles ===
(United States) Serena Williams defeated (Switzerland) Martina Hingis, 6–3, 7–6^{(7–4)}

• It was Williams' 1st career Grand Slam singles title.

=== Men's doubles ===
(Canada) Sébastien Lareau / (United States) Alex O'Brien defeated (India) Mahesh Bhupathi / (India) Leander Paes, 7–6^{(9–7)}, 6–4

• It was Lareau's 1st and only career Grand Slam doubles title.
• It was O'Brien's 1st and only career Grand Slam doubles title.

=== Women's doubles ===
(United States) Serena Williams / (United States) Venus Williams defeated (United States) Chanda Rubin / (France) Sandrine Testud, 4–6, 6–1, 6–4

- It was Serena Williams' 5th career Grand Slam title and her 3rd US Open title. It was Venus Williams' 4th career Grand Slam title and her 1st US Open title.v

=== Mixed doubles ===
(Japan) Ai Sugiyama / (India) Mahesh Bhupathi defeated (United States) Kimberly Po / (United States) Donald Johnson, 6–4, 6–4

• It was Sugiyama's 1st and only career Grand Slam mixed doubles title.
• It was Bhupathi's 2nd career Grand Slam mixed doubles title and his 1st at the US Open.

== Juniors ==
=== Boys' singles ===
(Finland) Jarkko Nieminen defeated (Denmark) Kristian Pless 6–7, 6–3, 6–4

=== Girls' singles ===
(Russia) Lina Krasnoroutskaya defeated (Russia) Nadia Petrova 6–3, 6–2

=== Boys' doubles ===
(France) Julien Benneteau / (France) Nicolas Mahut defeated (United States) Tres Davis / (United States) Alberto Francis 6–4, 3–6, 6–1

=== Girls' doubles ===
(Czech Republic) Dája Bedáňová / (Uzbekistan) Iroda Tulyaganova defeated (Russia) Galina Fokina / (Russia) Lina Krasnoroutskaya 6–3, 6–4

== Seeds ==
=== Men's singles ===
1. (United States) Pete Sampras (withdrew because of a back injury)
2. (United States) Andre Agassi (champion)
3. (Russia) Yevgeny Kafelnikov (semifinals, lost to Andre Agassi)
4. (Australia) Patrick Rafter (first round, lost to Cédric Pioline)
5. (Brazil) Gustavo Kuerten (quarterfinals, lost to Cédric Pioline)
6. (United Kingdom) Tim Henman (first round, lost to Guillermo Cañas)
7. (United States) Todd Martin (final, lost to Andre Agassi)
8. (Spain) Carlos Moyà (second round retired against Nicolas Escudé)
9. (United Kingdom) Greg Rusedski (fourth round, lost to Todd Martin)
10. (Chile) Marcelo Ríos (fourth round, lost to Nicolas Escudé)
11. (Australia) Mark Philippoussis (withdrew because of a left knee injury)
12. (Netherlands) Richard Krajicek (quarterfinals, lost to Yevgeny Kafelnikov)
13. (Spain) Àlex Corretja (first round, lost to Wayne Arthurs)
14. (Germany) Tommy Haas (fourth round, lost to Cédric Pioline)
15. (Germany) Nicolas Kiefer (third round, lost to Arnaud Clément)
16. (Ecuador) Nicolás Lapentti (second round, lost to Fredrik Jonsson)
17. (Spain) Félix Mantilla (first round, lost to Magnus Norman)

=== Women's singles ===
1. (Switzerland) Martina Hingis (final, lost to Serena Williams)
2. (United States) Lindsay Davenport (semifinals, lost to Serena Williams)
3. (United States) Venus Williams (semifinals, lost to Martina Hingis)
4. (United States) Monica Seles (quarterfinals, lost to Serena Williams)
5. (France) Mary Pierce (quarterfinals, lost to Lindsay Davenport)
6. (South Africa) Amanda Coetzer (first round, lost to Irina Spîrlea)
7. (United States) Serena Williams (champion)
8. (Czech Republic) Jana Novotná (third round, lost to Anke Huber)
9. (France) Julie Halard-Decugis (fourth round, lost to Lindsay Davenport)
10. (Spain) Arantxa Sánchez Vicario (fourth round, lost to Martina Hingis)
11. (France) Nathalie Tauziat (third round, lost to Jennifer Capriati)
12. (Austria) Barbara Schett (quarterfinals, lost to Venus Williams)
13. (Belgium) Dominique Van Roost (third round, lost to Mary Joe Fernández)
14. (France) Sandrine Testud (second round, lost to Magüi Serna)
15. (France) Amélie Mauresmo (fourth round, lost to Anke Huber)
16. (Spain) Conchita Martínez (fourth round, lost to Serena Williams)

Withdrawals: Steffi Graf, Anna Kournikova

| Preceded by 1999 Wimbledon Championships | Grand Slams | Succeeded by 2000 Australian Open |
