= Ansley Cargill =

American tennis player

- Country (sports): United States
- Born: January 5, 1982 (age 43) Atlanta, Georgia, U.S.
- Height: 5 ft 7 in (1.70 m)
- Turned pro: 2001
- Retired: 2006
- Plays: Right-handed (two handed backhand)
- College: Duke University
- Prize money: $338,622

Singles
- Career record: 199–162
- Career titles: 4 ITF
- Highest ranking: No. 90 (May 5, 2003)

Grand Slam singles results
- Australian Open: 2R (2003)
- French Open: 1R (2003)
- Wimbledon: 1R (2003)
- US Open: 1R (2000, 2001, 2002, 2003)

Doubles
- Career record: 90–94
- Career titles: 4 ITF
- Highest ranking: No. 67 (September 13, 2004)

Grand Slam doubles results
- Australian Open: 1R (2004)
- French Open: 2R (2004)
- Wimbledon: 2R (2004)
- US Open: 3R (2002)
Medal record
Pan American Games
| Bronze medal – third place | 2003 Santo Domingo | Singles |

Ansley Cargill (born January 5, 1982) is a former professional tennis player from the United States.

Cargill won four singles titles and four doubles titles on tournaments of the ITF Women's Circuit. She reached a career-high singles ranking of No. 90 in May 2003.

In 2006, she won the $50k Hammond event, defeating top seed Tatiana Poutchek of Belarus, 6–1, 6–3 in the quarterfinals, and No. 4 seed Tatiana Perebiynis of Ukraine in the final. That year, she also won the $25k tournament in Vancouver where she was defending champion.

On the WTA Tour, she reached one singles quarterfinal at Sarasota, FL in 2003. She defeated world No. 13, Patty Schnyder of Switzerland, in the first round, and world No. 31, Tamarine Tanasugarn of Thailand, in the second round before losing to world No. 22, Nathalie Dechy of France.

She also reached one WTA Tour doubles final at Tokyo, the Japan Open in 2003, with Ashley Harkleroad of the United States, they lost to Maria Sharapova and Tamarine Tanasugarn.

Cargill played nine major main-draw events and reached the second round of the 2003 Australian Open, defeating Anabel Medina Garrigues before losing to Venus Williams.

Following her graduation from Duke University, Cargill worked for two years in Equity Sales at the Atlanta office of financial brokerage firm Morgan Stanley. Since then, she works as financial analyst for the Boca Raton based management consultancy firm East Management Services.

== WTA career finals ==
=== Doubles: 1 (runner-up) ===
Legend
Tier I (0–0)
Tier II (0–0)
Tier III (0–1)
Tier IV & V (0–0)

| Outcome | Date | Tournament | Surface | Partner | Opponents | Score |
|---|---|---|---|---|---|---|
| Runner-up | Sep 29, 2003 | Japan Open | Hard | (United States) Ashley Harkleroad | (Russia) Maria Sharapova (Thailand) Tamarine Tanasugarn | 6–7^{(1–7)}, 0–6 |
