= 1999 French Open – Men's singles qualifying =

Men's singles qualifying
- 1999 French Open

Events
Singles	men	women		boys	girls
Doubles	men	women	mixed	boys	girls
WC Singles	men	women	quad
WC Doubles	men	women	quad
Legends	−45	45+	women

Qualification
Singles	men	women
- French Open

== Seeds ==
1. (Argentina) Gastón Gaudio (qualifier)
2. (India) Leander Paes (second round)
3. (Japan) Takao Suzuki (second round)
4. (Belarus) Vladimir Voltchkov (qualifying competition, lucky loser)
5. (Netherlands) Peter Wessels (first round)
6. (Uruguay) Marcelo Filippini (qualifier)
7. (Belgium) Xavier Malisse (qualifying competition, lucky loser)
8. (United States) Paul Goldstein (first round)
9. (Spain) Julián Alonso (qualifier)
10. (Denmark) Kenneth Carlsen (qualifying competition, lucky loser)
11. (Italy) Vincenzo Santopadre (qualifying competition)
12. (Spain) Germán Puentes (qualifier)
13. (Argentina) Eduardo Medica (second round)
14. (Germany) Michael Kohlmann (first round)
15. (Spain) Jacobo Díaz (second round)
16. (Sweden) Mikael Tillström (qualifying competition)
17. (Argentina) Agustín Calleri (qualifier)
18. (Italy) Marzio Martelli (first round)
19. (Spain) Juan Carlos Ferrero (first round)
20. (Germany) Axel Pretzsch (qualifier)
21. (United States) Geoff Grant (first round)
22. (Argentina) Gastón Etlis (second round)
23. (Argentina) Lucas Arnold Ker (qualifying competition)
24. (Germany) Markus Hantschk (qualifier)
25. (Germany) Lars Burgsmüller (first round)
26. (Finland) Ville Liukko (second round)
27. (Croatia) Ivan Ljubičić (second round)
28. (Spain) Juan Albert Viloca (second round)
29. (Italy) Mosé Navarra (qualifier)
30. (Norway) Jan Frode Andersen (first round)
31. (Argentina) Juan Ignacio Chela (first round)
32. (Italy) Renzo Furlan (qualifying competition)

== Qualifiers ==
1. (Argentina) Gastón Gaudio
2. (Argentina) Diego Moyano
3. (Spain) Álex López Morón
4. (Italy) Mosé Navarra
5. (Spain) Álex Calatrava
6. (Uruguay) Marcelo Filippini
7. (Belgium) Christophe Rochus
8. (Romania) Răzvan Sabău
9. (Spain) Julián Alonso
10. (Germany) Markus Hantschk
11. (Belarus) Max Mirnyi
12. (Spain) Germán Puentes
13. (Czech Republic) Petr Luxa
14. (Germany) Axel Pretzsch
15. (Argentina) Agustín Calleri
16. (Argentina) Hector Moretti

=== Lucky losers ===
1. (Belarus) Vladimir Voltchkov
2. (Belgium) Xavier Malisse
3. (Denmark) Kenneth Carlsen

== Qualifying draw ==
Key

- Q = Qualifier
- WC = Wild card
- LL = Lucky loser
- Alt = Alternate
- ITF = ITF entry
- PR = Protected ranking
- SR = Special ranking
- SE = Special exempt
- JE = Junior exempt
- JR = Junior Accelerator Programme entrant
- CO = College Accelerator Programme entrant
- NG = Next Gen Accelerator Program entrant
- w/o = Walkover
- r = Retired
- d = Defaulted

=== First qualifier ===
First round
1	(Argentina) Gastón Gaudio	4	6	7
(Netherlands) Dennis van Scheppingen	6	4	5
(Sweden) Fredrik Jonsson	4	3
(Hungary) Attila Sávolt	6	6
(Israel) Noam Behr	4	2
WC	(France) Olivier Malcor	6	6
(Finland) Kim Tiilikainen	2	0
32	(Italy) Renzo Furlan	6	6

Second round
1	(Argentina) Gastón Gaudio	6	6
(Hungary) Attila Sávolt	3	4
WC	(France) Olivier Malcor	5	4
32	(Italy) Renzo Furlan	7	6

Qualifying competition
1	(Argentina) Gastón Gaudio	6	4	6
32	(Italy) Renzo Furlan	3	6	4

=== Second qualifier ===
First round
2	(India) Leander Paes	7^{7}	2	8
(Austria) Wolfgang Schranz	6^{5}	6	6
WC	(France) Olivier Delaître	6	7^{7}
(Switzerland) Lorenzo Manta	1	6^{3}
(Argentina) Andrés Zingman	7^{7}	6
(Australia) Michael Tebbutt	6^{4}	2
(Argentina) Diego Moyano	6	6
31	(Argentina) Juan Ignacio Chela	2	3

Second round
2	(India) Leander Paes	4	4
WC	(France) Olivier Delaître	6	6
(Argentina) Andrés Zingman	6	5	2
(Argentina) Diego Moyano	2	7	6

Qualifying competition
WC	(France) Olivier Delaître	6^{9}	7^{7}	4
(Argentina) Diego Moyano	7^{11}	6^{3}	6

=== Third qualifier ===
First round
3	(Japan) Takao Suzuki	6	3
(Italy) Marco Meneschincheri	1	0^{r}
(United States) Michael Sell	2	7	2
(Spain) Álex López Morón	6	5	6
WC	(France) Jérôme Haehnel	3	0
WC	(France) Thierry Guardiola	6	6
(Brazil) Márcio Carlsson	6	6
30	(Norway) Jan Frode Andersen	1	3

Second round
3	(Japan) Takao Suzuki	7^{7}	3	1
(Spain) Álex López Morón	6^{5}	6	6
WC	(France) Thierry Guardiola	6	3	7
(Brazil) Márcio Carlsson	0	6	5

Qualifying competition
(Spain) Álex López Morón	6^{7}	6	6
WC	(France) Thierry Guardiola	7^{9}	2	0

=== Fourth qualifier ===
First round
4	(Belarus) Vladimir Voltchkov	6	6
(Mexico) Alejandro Hernández	4	4
(Brazil) Adriano Ferreira	6^{5}	3
(Belgium) Johan Van Herck	7^{7}	6
(France) Rodolphe Cadart	6^{3}	1
(Argentina) Andrés Schneiter	7^{7}	6
(Thailand) Paradorn Srichaphan	7^{7}	3	2
29	(Italy) Mosé Navarra	6^{1}	6	6

Second round
4	(Belarus) Vladimir Voltchkov	7	3	6
(Belgium) Johan Van Herck	5	6	2
(Argentina) Andrés Schneiter	6	6^{10}	2
29	(Italy) Mosé Navarra	4	7^{12}	6

Qualifying competition
4	(Belarus) Vladimir Voltchkov	4	3
29	(Italy) Mosé Navarra	6	6

=== Fifth qualifier ===
First round
5	(Netherlands) Peter Wessels	1	3
(Czech Republic) Tomáš Zíb	6	6
(Spain) Álex Calatrava	6	6
(Israel) Lior Mor	1	2
(Haiti) Ronald Agénor	6	6
WC	(France) Jérôme Hanquez	3	4
(Spain) Emilio Benfele Álvarez	4	4
28	(Spain) Juan Albert Viloca	6	6

Second round
(Czech Republic) Tomáš Zíb	6^{5}	4
(Spain) Álex Calatrava	7^{7}	6
(Haiti) Ronald Agénor	6	6
28	(Spain) Juan Albert Viloca	2	4

Qualifying competition
(Spain) Álex Calatrava	6	6
(Haiti) Ronald Agénor	3	2

=== Sixth qualifier ===
First round
6	(Uruguay) Marcelo Filippini	7^{7}	6
(Sweden) Patrik Fredriksson	6^{3}	4
(Switzerland) George Bastl	6	6^{5}	6
(Germany) Christian Vinck	4	7^{7}	3
(India) Mahesh Bhupathi	6	6
(Israel) Oren Motevassel	2	1
Alt	(Israel) Noam Okun	3	5
27	(Croatia) Ivan Ljubičić	6	7

Second round
6	(Uruguay) Marcelo Filippini	7^{7}	7^{7}
(Switzerland) George Bastl	6^{4}	6^{5}
(India) Mahesh Bhupathi	6	3	6
27	(Croatia) Ivan Ljubičić	2	6	3

Qualifying competition
6	(Uruguay) Marcelo Filippini	6	6
(India) Mahesh Bhupathi	3	2

=== Seventh qualifier ===
First round
7	(Belgium) Xavier Malisse	4	7^{7}	6
(Romania) Gabriel Trifu	6	6^{2}	3
(Italy) Cristiano Caratti	7^{7}	7^{7}
(United States) Alex O'Brien	6^{5}	6^{4}
(Austria) Julian Knowle	6	3	2
(Belgium) Christophe Rochus	4	6	6
(Finland) Tuomas Ketola	4	6	1
26	(Finland) Ville Liukko	6	3	6

Second round
7	(Belgium) Xavier Malisse	6	6
(Italy) Cristiano Caratti	3	2
(Belgium) Christophe Rochus	6	6
26	(Finland) Ville Liukko	3	4

Qualifying competition
7	(Belgium) Xavier Malisse	6	3	3
(Belgium) Christophe Rochus	3	6	6

=== Eighth qualifier ===
First round
8	(United States) Paul Goldstein	4	4
(South Africa) Marcos Ondruska	6	6
(Argentina) Federico Browne	4	4
(Romania) Răzvan Sabău	6	6
WC	(France) Michaël Llodra	6	6
(Belgium) Christophe van Garsse	4	1
(Ecuador) Luis Morejón	6	6
25	(Germany) Lars Burgsmüller	2	1

Second round
(South Africa) Marcos Ondruska	6	5	2
(Romania) Răzvan Sabău	4	7	6
WC	(France) Michaël Llodra	7^{7}	7^{7}
(Ecuador) Luis Morejón	6^{5}	6^{4}

Qualifying competition
(Romania) Răzvan Sabău	6	6
WC	(France) Michaël Llodra	3	2

=== Ninth qualifier ===
First round
9	(Spain) Julián Alonso	4	6	9
(Spain) Javier Sánchez	6	3	7
(Spain) Eduardo Nicolás-Espín	6	6
(Italy) Stefano Pescosolido	2	2
(Switzerland) Ivo Heuberger	6	6
(Australia) Michael Hill	3	3
(South Africa) Jeff Coetzee	6^{6}	1
23	(Argentina) Lucas Arnold Ker	7^{8}	6

Second round
9	(Spain) Julián Alonso	6	6
(Spain) Eduardo Nicolás-Espín	3	4
(Switzerland) Ivo Heuberger	3	4
23	(Argentina) Lucas Arnold Ker	6	6

Qualifying competition
9	(Spain) Julián Alonso	6^{1}	7	6
23	(Argentina) Lucas Arnold Ker	7^{7}	5	1

=== Tenth qualifier ===
First round
10	(Denmark) Kenneth Carlsen	6	2	10
(United States) Bob Bryan	3	6	8
(Brazil) Jaime Oncins	4	0
(Venezuela) Maurice Ruah	6	6
(Netherlands) Rogier Wassen	5	6	6
(Brazil) Paulo Taicher	7	4	4
(Denmark) Thomas Larsen	2	4
24	(Germany) Markus Hantschk	6	6

Second round
10	(Denmark) Kenneth Carlsen	7^{7}	7
(Venezuela) Maurice Ruah	6^{5}	5
(Netherlands) Rogier Wassen	3	3
24	(Germany) Markus Hantschk	6	6

Qualifying competition
10	(Denmark) Kenneth Carlsen	3	2
24	(Germany) Markus Hantschk	6	6

=== Eleventh qualifier ===
First round
11	(Italy) Vincenzo Santopadre	3	6	6
(Japan) Gouichi Motomura	6	2	1
(Czech Republic) Jiří Vaněk	7^{7}	7^{7}
(Australia) Wayne Arthurs	6^{5}	6^{4}
(Belarus) Max Mirnyi	7	6^{4}	6
(Netherlands) Raemon Sluiter	5	7^{7}	4
(Japan) Hideki Kaneko	1	2
22	(Argentina) Gastón Etlis	6	6

Second round
11	(Italy) Vincenzo Santopadre	4	7^{7}	6
(Czech Republic) Jiří Vaněk	6	6^{4}	4
(Belarus) Max Mirnyi	6	6
22	(Argentina) Gastón Etlis	3	4

Qualifying competition
11	(Italy) Vincenzo Santopadre	3	4
(Belarus) Max Mirnyi	6	6

=== Twelfth qualifier ===
First round
12	(Spain) Germán Puentes	6	6
(Israel) Ofer Sela	2	1
(France) Nicolas Thomann	6^{4}	2
(Australia) James Sekulov	7^{7}	6
(Argentina) Sebastián Prieto	2	3
(Argentina) Francisco Cabello	6	6
WC	(France) Gérard Solvès	6	6
21	(United States) Geoff Grant	2	0

Second round
12	(Spain) Germán Puentes	7^{7}	6
(Australia) James Sekulov	6^{4}	3
(Argentina) Francisco Cabello	6	6
WC	(France) Gérard Solvès	3	3

Qualifying competition
12	(Spain) Germán Puentes	7^{7}	6
(Argentina) Francisco Cabello	6^{3}	3

=== Thirteenth qualifier ===
First round
13	(Spain) Eduardo Medica	7^{7}	2	7
(Slovenia) Iztok Božič	6^{5}	6	5
(Czech Republic) Petr Luxa	7	2	8
(United States) Jared Palmer	5	6	6
(Russia) Andrei Stoliarov	2	6	8
(United States) Brian MacPhie	6	4	6
(Czech Republic) Radomír Vašek	6	6
19	(Spain) Juan Carlos Ferrero	4	2

Second round
13	(Spain) Eduardo Medica	6	6^{2}	1
(Czech Republic) Petr Luxa	4	7^{7}	6
(Russia) Andrei Stoliarov	4	7^{7}	7
(Czech Republic) Radomír Vašek	6	6^{5}	5

Qualifying competition
(Czech Republic) Petr Luxa	6	6
(Russia) Andrei Stoliarov	1	4

=== Fourteenth qualifier ===
First round
14	(Germany) Michael Kohlmann	4	3
(Uzbekistan) Oleg Ogorodov	6	6
(France) Sébastien de Chaunac	4	5
(Russia) Andrei Cherkasov	6	7
(Czech Republic) Ota Fukárek	7^{10}	6
(Spain) David Caballero	6^{8}	1
(Israel) Eyal Ran	3	7^{7}	1
20	(Germany) Axel Pretzsch	6	6^{4}	6

Second round
(Uzbekistan) Oleg Ogorodov	6	3	6
(Russia) Andrei Cherkasov	1	6	4
(Czech Republic) Ota Fukárek	5	4
20	(Germany) Axel Pretzsch	7	6

Qualifying competition
(Uzbekistan) Oleg Ogorodov	2	4
20	(Germany) Axel Pretzsch	6	6

=== Fifteenth qualifier ===
First round
15	(Spain) Jacobo Díaz	6	6
(United States) David Caldwell	4	3
(France) Olivier Mutis	7	4
(Chile) Nicolás Massú	5	1^{r}
(United Kingdom) Chris Wilkinson	5	3
WC	(France) Olivier Patience	7	6
(Brazil) Daniel Melo	3	6	8
17	(Argentina) Agustín Calleri	6	4	10

Second round
15	(Spain) Jacobo Díaz	5	4
(France) Olivier Mutis	7	6
WC	(France) Olivier Patience	1	0
17	(Argentina) Agustín Calleri	6	6

Qualifying competition
(France) Olivier Mutis	4	6^{3}
17	(Argentina) Agustín Calleri	6	7^{7}

=== Sixteenth qualifier ===
First round
16	(Sweden) Mikael Tillström	6	6
(Brazil) Francisco Costa	2	3
PR	(New Zealand) Alistair Hunt	6	6
WC	(France) Jean-Michel Pequery	2	4
(Germany) Dirk Dier	1	6^{5}
(Argentina) Hector Moretti	6	7^{7}
(Spain) Oscar Serrano	6	6
18	(Italy) Marzio Martelli	1	3

Second round
16	(Sweden) Mikael Tillström	6	6
PR	(New Zealand) Alistair Hunt	3	2
(Argentina) Hector Moretti	6	6
(Spain) Oscar Serrano	2	1

Qualifying competition
(Sweden) Mikael Tillström	3	5
(Argentina) Hector Moretti	6	7
