= 1999 French Open – Women's singles qualifying =

Women's singles qualifying
- 1999 French Open

Events
Singles	men	women		boys	girls
Doubles	men	women	mixed	boys	girls
WC Singles	men	women	quad
WC Doubles	men	women	quad
Legends	−45	45+	women

Qualification
Singles	men	women
- French Open

== Seeds ==
1. (Czech Republic) Sandra Kleinová (second round)
2. (Federal Republic of Yugoslavia) Sandra Naćuk (qualifier)
3. (Bulgaria) Pavlina Stoyanova (qualifier)
4. (Australia) Kerry-Anne Guse (first round)
5. (Belgium) Justine Henin (qualifier)
6. (Chinese Taipei) Janet Lee (moved to main draw)
7. (Argentina) Inés Gorrochategui (qualifier)
8. (Germany) Miriam Schnitzer (first round)
9. (Japan) Nana Miyagi (first round)
10. (Germany) Anca Barna (second round)
11. (United States) Meilen Tu (qualifier)
12. (Czech Republic) Lenka Němečková (second round)
13. (Hungary) Anna-Maria Foldenyi (qualifier)
14. (Russia) Elena Dementieva (qualifying competition, lucky loser)
15. (Argentina) Florencia Labat (first round)
16. (Austria) Patricia Wartusch (qualifying competition)
17. (Austria) Barbara Schwartz (qualifier)

== Qualifiers ==
1. (Hungary) Anna-Maria Foldenyi
2. (Austria) Barbara Schwartz
3. (Switzerland) Miroslava Vavrinec
4. (Argentina) Inés Gorrochategui
5. (United States) Meilen Tu
6. (Bulgaria) Pavlina Stoyanova
7. (Belgium) Justine Henin
8. (Federal Republic of Yugoslavia) Sandra Naćuk

=== Lucky losers ===
1. (Russia) Elena Dementieva

== Qualifying draw ==
Key

- Q = Qualifier
- WC = Wild card
- LL = Lucky loser
- Alt = Alternate
- ITF = ITF entry
- PR = Protected ranking
- SR = Special ranking
- SE = Special exempt
- JE = Junior exempt
- JR = Junior Accelerator Programme entrant
- CO = College Accelerator Programme entrant
- NG = Next Gen Accelerator Program entrant
- w/o = Walkover
- r = Retired
- d = Defaulted

=== First qualifier ===
First round
1	(Czech Republic) Sandra Kleinová	6	6
(South Korea) Park Sung-hee	1	0
(Italy) Francesca Lubiani	6	3	6
(United States) Jill Craybas	1	6	3
(India) Nirupama Vaidyanathan	3	4
(South Africa) Surina De Beer	6	6
(Spain) Gisela Riera	3	3
13	(Hungary) Anna-Maria Foldenyi	6	6

Second round
1	(Czech Republic) Sandra Kleinová	5	5
(Italy) Francesca Lubiani	7	7
(South Africa) Surina De Beer	6	3	3
13	(Hungary) Anna-Maria Foldenyi	2	6	6

Qualifying competition
(Italy) Francesca Lubiani	3	1
13	(Hungary) Anna-Maria Foldenyi	6	6

=== Second qualifier ===
First round
12	(Czech Republic) Lenka Němečková	6	6
(South Africa) Liezel Horn	1	2
(Hungary) Petra Mandula	5	2
(Germany) Jana Kandarr	7	6
(Austria) Marion Maruska	6	3	6
(France) Noëlle van Lottum	2	6	0
(Germany) Julia Abe	6^{5}	2
17	(Austria) Barbara Schwartz	7^{7}	6

Second round
12	(Czech Republic) Lenka Němečková	4	5
(Germany) Jana Kandarr	6	7
(Austria) Marion Maruska	1	3
17	(Austria) Barbara Schwartz	6	6

Qualifying competition
(Germany) Jana Kandarr	1	2
17	(Austria) Barbara Schwartz	6	6

=== Third qualifier ===
First round
4	(Australia) Kerry-Anne Guse	2	0
(Italy) Flora Perfetti	6	6
(Switzerland) Miroslava Vavrinec	6	6
Alt	(United Kingdom) Joanne Ward	4	4
(Japan) Yuka Yoshida	6	7
WC	(France) Aurélie Védy	4	5
(United States) Samantha Reeves	6	6
9	(Japan) Nana Miyagi	2	4

Second round
(Italy) Flora Perfetti	4	6^{3}
(Switzerland) Miroslava Vavrinec	6	7^{7}
(Japan) Yuka Yoshida	4	6	2
(United States) Samantha Reeves	6	4	6

Qualifying competition
(Switzerland) Miroslava Vavrinec	6	7
(United States) Samantha Reeves	4	5

=== Fourth qualifier ===
First round
16	(Austria) Patricia Wartusch	7^{7}	5	6
(France) Marina Caiazzo	6^{4}	7	3
(Italy) Maria Paola Zavagli	5	7	6
(Poland) Aleksandra Olsza	7	5	4
(Spain) Ángeles Montolio	6	6
(United States) Karin Miller	1	4
(Russia) Nadia Petrova	2	3
7	(Argentina) Inés Gorrochategui	6	6

Second round
16	(Austria) Patricia Wartusch	2	6	6
(Italy) Maria Paola Zavagli	6	1	0
(Spain) Ángeles Montolio	6	4	3
7	(Argentina) Inés Gorrochategui	0	6	6

Qualifying competition
16	(Austria) Patricia Wartusch	3	3
7	(Argentina) Inés Gorrochategui	6	6

=== Fifth qualifier ===
First round
8	(Germany) Miriam Schnitzer	6^{4}	0
(Slovenia) Tina Križan	7^{7}	6
(United Kingdom) Louise Latimer	6	3	6
(Japan) Shinobu Asagoe	4	6	4
(Spain) Mariam Ramon Climent	6	6
(Slovakia) Radka Zrubáková	2	2
(Spain) Conchita Martínez Granados	1	4
11	(United States) Meilen Tu	6	6

Second round
(Slovenia) Tina Križan	6	6
(United Kingdom) Louise Latimer	0	1
(Spain) Mariam Ramon Climent	6^{7}	2
11	(United States) Meilen Tu	7^{9}	6

Qualifying competition
(Slovenia) Tina Križan	7^{8}	1	6
11	(United States) Meilen Tu	6^{6}	6	8

=== Sixth qualifier ===
First round
14	(Russia) Elena Dementieva	6	6
(Belgium) Patty Van Acker	3	4
(Brazil) Vanessa Menga	3	2
(United States) Erika deLone	6	6
WC	(France) Caroline Dhenin	6	0	1
(Australia) Annabel Ellwood	4	6	6
WC	(France) Camille Pin	6	2	0
3	(Bulgaria) Pavlina Stoyanova	4	6	6

Second round
14	(Russia) Elena Dementieva	7^{7}	7
(United States) Erika deLone	6^{3}	5
(Australia) Annabel Ellwood	6	5	2
3	(Bulgaria) Pavlina Stoyanova	4	7	6

Qualifying competition
14	(Russia) Elena Dementieva	2	3
3	(Bulgaria) Pavlina Stoyanova	6	6

=== Seventh qualifier ===
First round
5	(Belgium) Justine Henin	6	6
(United States) Mashona Washington	3	1
WC	(France) Sophie Erre	4	2
WC	(France) Stéphanie Testard	6	6
WC	(France) Karolina Jagieniak	1	1
(Russia) Elena Makarova	6	6
(Slovakia) Janette Husárová	6	3	0
10	(Germany) Anca Barna	4	6	6

Second round
5	(Belgium) Justine Henin	6	3
WC	(France) Stéphanie Testard	1	0^{r}
(Russia) Elena Makarova	3	6	6
10	(Germany) Anca Barna	6	3	4

Qualifying competition
5	(Belgium) Justine Henin	6	7
(Russia) Elena Makarova	0	5

=== Eighth qualifier ===
First round
15	(Argentina) Florencia Labat	7	6^{4}	5
(Paraguay) Larissa Schaerer	5	7^{7}	7
(Spain) Eva Bes-Ostariz	7^{7}	6
(United Kingdom) Julie Pullin	6^{5}	3
(United Kingdom) Karen Cross	1	3
(Israel) Hila Rosen	6	6
(United States) Sandra Cacic	6	4	4
2	(Federal Republic of Yugoslavia) Sandra Naćuk	4	6	6

Second round
(Paraguay) Larissa Schaerer	6	2	6
(Spain) Eva Bes-Ostariz	3	6	2
(Israel) Hila Rosen	6^{3}	4
2	(Federal Republic of Yugoslavia) Sandra Naćuk	7^{7}	6

Qualifying competition
(Paraguay) Larissa Schaerer	0	5
2	(Federal Republic of Yugoslavia) Sandra Naćuk	6	7
