= 1999 in tennis =

This page covers all the important events in the sport of tennis in 1999. It provides the results of notable tournaments throughout the year on both the ATP and WTA Tours, the Davis Cup, and the Fed Cup.

== ITF ==
=== Grand Slam events ===
Category	Championship	Champions	Finalists	Score in the final
Men's singles	Australian Open	(Russia) Yevgeny Kafelnikov	(Sweden) Thomas Enqvist	4–6, 6–0, 6–3, 7–6^{(7–1)}
Men's singles	French Open	(United States) Andre Agassi	(Ukraine) Andrei Medvedev	1–6, 2–6, 6–4, 6–3, 6–4
Men's singles	Wimbledon	(United States) Pete Sampras	(United States) Andre Agassi	6–3, 6–4, 7–5
Men's singles	US Open	(United States) Andre Agassi	(United States) Todd Martin	6–4, 6–7^{(5–7)}, 6–7^{(2–7)}, 6–3, 6–2

Category	Championship	Champions	Finalists	Score in the final
Women's singles	Australian Open	(Switzerland) Martina Hingis	(France) Amélie Mauresmo	6–2, 6–3
Women's singles	French Open	(Germany) Steffi Graf	(Switzerland) Martina Hingis	4–6, 7–5, 6–2
Women's singles	Wimbledon	(United States) Lindsay Davenport	(Germany) Steffi Graf	6–4, 7–5
Women's singles	US Open	(United States) Serena Williams	(Switzerland) Martina Hingis	6–3, 7–6^{(7–4)}

Category	Championship	Champions	Finalists	Score in the final
Men's doubles	Australian Open	(Sweden) Jonas Björkman (Australia) Patrick Rafter	(India) Mahesh Bhupathi (India) Leander Paes	6–3, 4–6, 6–4, 6–7^{(10–12)}, 6–4
Men's doubles	French Open	(India) Mahesh Bhupathi (India) Leander Paes	(Croatia) Goran Ivanišević (United States) Jeff Tarango	6–2, 7–5
Men's doubles	Wimbledon	(India) Mahesh Bhupathi (India) Leander Paes	(Netherlands) Paul Haarhuis (United States) Jared Palmer	6–7^{(10–12)}, 6–3, 6–4, 7–6^{(7–4)}
Men's doubles	US Open	(Canada) Sébastien Lareau (United States) Alex O'Brien	(India) Mahesh Bhupathi (India) Leander Paes	7–6^{(9–7)}, 6–4

Category	Championship	Champions	Finalists	Score in the final
Women's doubles	Australian Open	(Switzerland) Martina Hingis (Russia) Anna Kournikova	(United States) Lindsay Davenport (Belarus) Natasha Zvereva	7–5, 6–3
Women's doubles	French Open	(United States) Serena Williams (United States) Venus Williams	(Switzerland) Martina Hingis (Russia) Anna Kournikova	6–3, 6–7^{(2–7)}, 8–6
Women's doubles	Wimbledon	(United States) Lindsay Davenport (United States) Corina Morariu	(South Africa) Mariaan de Swardt (Ukraine) Elena Tatarkova	6–4, 6–4
Women's doubles	US Open	(United States) Serena Williams (United States) Venus Williams	(United States) Chanda Rubin (France) Sandrine Testud	4–6, 6–1, 6–4

Category	Championship	Champions	Finalists	Score in the final
Mixed doubles	Australian Open	(South Africa) Mariaan de Swardt (South Africa) David Adams	(United States) Serena Williams (Belarus) Max Mirnyi	6–4, 4–6, 7–6^{(7–5)}
Mixed doubles	French Open	(Slovenia) Katarina Srebotnik (South Africa) Piet Norval	(Latvia) Larisa Neiland (United States) Rick Leach	6–3, 3–6, 6–3
Mixed doubles	Wimbledon	(United States) Lisa Raymond (India) Leander Paes	(Sweden) Jonas Björkman (Russia) Anna Kournikova	6–4, 3–6, 6–3
Mixed doubles	US Open	(Japan) Ai Sugiyama (India) Mahesh Bhupathi	(United States) Kimberly Po (United States) Donald Johnson	6–4, 6–4

=== Davis Cup ===
1999 Davis Cup Champions
(Australia)
Australia
27th title

France
2
Acropolis Exhibition Hall, Nice, France
3–5 December
Clay (indoors)

Australia
3

			1	2	3	4	5
1	(France) (Australia)	Sébastien Grosjean; Mark Philippoussis	4; 6	2; 6	4; 6
2	(France) (Australia)	Cédric Pioline; Lleyton Hewitt	7^{9} 6^{7}	7^{8} 6^{6}	7; 5
3	(France) (Australia)	Olivier Delaître / Fabrice Santoro; Todd Woodbridge / Mark Woodforde	6; 2	5; 7	2; 6	2; 6
4	(France) (Australia)	Cédric Pioline; Mark Philippoussis	3; 6	7; 5	1; 6	2; 6
5	(France) (Australia)	Sébastien Grosjean; Lleyton Hewitt	6; 4	6; 3

=== Fed Cup ===
1999 Fed Cup Champions
(United States)
United States
16th title

United States
4
Taube Tennis Stadium, Stanford, United States
18–19 September
Plexipave (outdoors)

Russia
1

			1	2	3
1	(United States) (Russia)	Venus Williams; Elena Likhovtseva	6; 3	6; 4
2	(United States) (Russia)	Lindsay Davenport; Elena Dementieva	6; 4	6; 0
3	(United States) (Russia)	Lindsay Davenport; Elena Likhovtseva	6; 4	6; 4
4	(United States) (Russia)	Venus Williams; Elena Dementieva	6; 1	3; 6	6^{5} 7^{7}
5	(United States) (Russia)	Serena Williams / Venus Williams; Elena Dementieva / Elena Makarova	6; 2	6; 1

=== Hopman Cup ===
1999 Hopman Cup Champions
(Australia)
Australia
1st title

Australia
2
(Australia) Burswood Entertainment Complex, Perth, Australia
2–9 January

Sweden
1

			1	2	3
1	(Australia) (Sweden)	Jelena Dokić; Åsa Carlsson	6; 2	7^{10} 6^{8}
2	(Australia) (Sweden)	Mark Philippoussis; Jonas Björkman	6; 3	7^{8} 6^{6}
3	(Australia) (Sweden)	Jelena Dokić / Mark Philippoussis; Åsa Carlsson / Jonas Björkman	6; 8

== ATP/WTA ==
=== ATP World Team Cup ===
1999 ATP World Team Cup Champions
(Australia)
Australia
2nd title

Sweden
1
(Germany) Rochusclub, Düsseldorf, Germany
17–23 May
Clay (outdoors)

Australia
2

			1	2	3
1	(Sweden) (Australia)	Jonas Björkman; Mark Philippoussis	6; 4	7^{7} 6^{3}
2	(Sweden) (Australia)	Thomas Enqvist; Patrick Rafter	7; 5	3; 6	3; 6
3	(Sweden) (Australia)	Jonas Björkman / Nicklas Kulti; Sandon Stolle / Jonas Björkman	6; 7	4; 6

=== Year-end singles rankings ===
Men's singles

#	Player	Points
1	(United States) Andre Agassi	5,048
2	(Russia) Yevgeny Kafelnikov	3,465
3	(United States) Pete Sampras	3,024
4	(Sweden) Thomas Enqvist	2,606
5	(Brazil) Gustavo Kuerten	2,601
6	(Germany) Nicolas Kiefer	2,447
7	(United States) Todd Martin	2,408
8	(Ecuador) Nicolas Lapentti	2,284
9	(Chile) Marcelo Rios	2,245
10	(Netherlands) Richard Krajicek	2,095

Women's singles

#	Player	Points
1	(Switzerland) Martina Hingis	6,074
2	(United States) Lindsay Davenport	4,841
3	(United States) Venus Williams	4,378
4	(United States) Serena Williams	3,021
5	(France) Mary Pierce	2,658
6	(United States) Monica Seles	2,310
7	(France) Nathalie Tauziat	2,213
8	(Austria) Barbara Schett	2,188
9	(France) Julie Halard-Decugis	1,977
10	(France) Amélie Mauresmo	1,906
