= 1999 French Open =

- Date: 24 May – 6 June 1999
- Edition: 98
- Category: 69th Grand Slam (ITF)
- Surface: Clay
- Location: Paris (XVI^{e}), France
- Venue: Stade Roland Garros

Champions

Men's singles
- (United States) Andre Agassi

Women's singles
- (Germany) Steffi Graf

Men's doubles
- (India) Mahesh Bhupathi / (India) Leander Paes

Women's doubles
- (United States) Serena Williams / (United States) Venus Williams

Mixed doubles
- (South Africa) Piet Norval / (Slovenia) Katarina Srebotnik

Boys' singles
- (Argentina) Guillermo Coria

Girls' singles
- (Spain) Lourdes Domínguez Lino

Boys' doubles
- (Georgia (country)) Irakli Labadze / (Croatia) Lovro Zovko

Girls' doubles
- (Italy) Flavia Pennetta / (Italy) Roberta Vinci
- French Open

The 1999 French Open was a tennis tournament that took place on the outdoor clay courts at the Stade Roland Garros in Paris, France. The tournament was held from 24 May until 6 June. It was the 98th staging of the French Open, and the second Grand Slam tennis event of 1999.

== Seniors ==
=== Men's singles ===
(United States) Andre Agassi defeated (Ukraine) Andrei Medvedev, 1–6, 2–6, 6–4, 6–3, 6–4

• It was Agassi's 4th career Grand Slam singles title and his 1st and only title at the French Open.

=== Women's singles ===
(Germany) Steffi Graf defeated (Switzerland) Martina Hingis, 4–6, 7–5, 6–2

• It was Graf's 22nd and last career Grand Slam singles title and her 6th title at the French Open.

=== Men's doubles ===
(India) Mahesh Bhupathi / (India) Leander Paes defeated (Croatia) Goran Ivanišević / (United States) Jeff Tarango, 6–2, 7–5

• It was Bhupathi's 1st career Grand Slam doubles title.
• It was Paes' 1st career Grand Slam doubles title.

=== Women's doubles ===
(United States) Serena Williams / (United States) Venus Williams defeated (Switzerland) Martina Hingis / (Russia) Anna Kournikova, 6–3, 6–7^{(2–7)}, 8–6

• It was S. Williams' 1st career Grand Slam doubles title.
• It was V. Williams' 1st career Grand Slam doubles title.

=== Mixed doubles ===
(Slovenia) Katarina Srebotnik / (South Africa) Piet Norval defeated (Latvia) Larisa Neiland / (United States) Rick Leach, 6–3, 3–6, 6–3

• It was Srebotnik's 1st career Grand Slam mixed doubles title.
• It was Norval's 1st and only career Grand Slam mixed doubles title.

== Juniors ==
=== Boys' singles ===
(Argentina) Guillermo Coria def. (Argentina) David Nalbandian, 6–4, 6–3

=== Girls' singles ===
(Spain) Lourdes Domínguez Lino defeated (France) Stéphanie Foretz, 6–4, 6–4

=== Boys' doubles ===
(Georgia (country)) Irakli Labadze / (Croatia) Lovro Zovko defeated (Denmark) Kristian Pless / (Belgium) Olivier Rochus, 6–1, 7–6

=== Girls' doubles ===
(Italy) Flavia Pennetta / (Italy) Roberta Vinci defeated (Germany) Mia Buric / (Belgium) Kim Clijsters, 7–5, 5–7, 6–4

== Singles players ==
=== Men's singles ===
- Men's singles

| Champion | | Runner-up | |
|---|---|---|---|
| (United States) Andre Agassi (13) | | (Ukraine) Andrei Medvedev | |
Semifinals out
| (Slovakia) Dominik Hrbatý | | (Brazil) Fernando Meligeni | |
Quarterfinals out
| (Chile) M Ríos (9) | (Uruguay) M Filippini | (Spain) À Corretja (6) | (Brazil) G Kuerten (8) |
4th round out
| (Russia) M Safin | (Spain) A Berasategui | (Spain) C Moyá (4) | (United Kingdom) G Rusedski (12) |
| (Austria) S Koubek | (Spain) F Mantilla (14) | (Czech Republic) B Ulihrach | (France) A Di Pasquale |
3rd round out
| (Australia) A Ilie | (Morocco) H Arazi | (Spain) A Costa | (United Kingdom) T Henman (7) |
| (Armenia) S Sargsian | (United States) C Woodruff | (Italy) D Sanguinetti | (United States) V Spadea |
| (Argentina) G Gaudio | (France) S Grosjean | (Germany) T Haas | (Australia) P Rafter (3) |
| (Netherlands) S Schalken | (Italy) A Gaudenzi | (Norway) C Ruud | (Zimbabwe) B Black |
2nd round out
| (Russia) Y Kafelnikov (1) | (Argentina) M Rodríguez | (Germany) J Knippschild | (United States) J Courier |
| (France) A Boetsch | (Argentina) A Calleri | (France) S Huet | (Czech Republic) J Novák |
| (Czech Republic) P Korda | (South Africa) W Ferreira | (Ecuador) N Lapentti | (France) A Clément |
| (Australia) R Fromberg | (Argentina) H Gumy | (Czech Republic) M Damm | (Netherlands) R Krajicek (5) |
| (Spain) F Vicente | (Germany) B Karbacher | (Spain) Á López Morón | (Sweden) M Larsson |
| (Argentina) M Puerta | (Italy) M Navarra | (Morocco) Y El Aynaoui | (France) N Escudé |
| (Argentina) G Cañas | (Spain) F Clavet | (Germany) M Hantschk | (Australia) J Stoltenberg |
| (Sweden) T Enqvist (16) | (Belarus) M Mirnyi | (Spain) A Portas | (United States) P Sampras (2) |
1st round out
| (United States) M Chang | (France) J Boutter | (Sweden) J Björkman | (Australia) L Hewitt |
| (France) L Roux | (Slovakia) J Krošlák | (Spain) Á Calatrava | (Croatia) G Ivanišević (15) |
| (Germany) A Pretzsch | (Romania) Sabău | (Czech Republic) D Vacek | (Sweden) M Gustafsson |
| (Zimbabwe) W Black | (Germany) H Dreekmann | (Canada) D Nestor | (Morocco) K Alami |
| (Austria) M Hipfl | (Spain) A Martín | (Denmark) K Carlsen | (France) J-R Lisnard |
| (Austria) T Muster | (Argentina) D Moyano | (France) C Pioline | (Argentina) F Squillari |
| (Germany) D Prinosil | (France) A Dupuis | (Netherlands) J van Lottum | (Romania) A Pavel |
| (Italy) L Tieleman | (Germany) N Kiefer | (Australia) M Woodforde | (United States) J-M Gambill |
| (Spain) G Puentes | (United States) J Tarango | (Sweden) M Norman | (Germany) O Gross |
| (France) G Raoux | (Australia) T Woodbridge | (France) F Santoro | (Slovakia) K Kučera (11) |
| (France) R Gilbert | (Italy) G Pozzi | (Switzerland) M Rosset | (Australia) S Draper |
| (United States) J Gimelstob | (Belgium) X Malisse | (Czech Republic) P Luxa | (Switzerland) R Federer |
| (Spain) G Blanco | (Netherlands) J Siemerink | (Netherlands) P Haarhuis | (Spain) J Alonso |
| (Germany) R Schüttler | (Belarus) V Voltchkov | (Paraguay) R Delgado | (Australia) M Philippoussis (10) |
| (Argentina) H Moretti | (Spain) C Costa | (Belgium) C Rochus | (Argentina) M Zabaleta |
| (Romania) A Voinea | (United States) C Mamiit | (Romania) D Pescariu | (Costa Rica) J A Marín |

== Notes ==
| Preceded by 1999 Australian Open | Grand Slams | Succeeded by 1999 Wimbledon Championships |
