= Héctor Moretti =

Argentine tennis player

- Country (sports): Argentina
- Born: January 27, 1973 (age 52); Buenos Aires, Argentina
- Height: 1.70 m (5 ft 7 in)
- Turned pro: 1991
- Plays: Right-handed
- Prize money: $81,458

Singles
- Career record: 0–2
- Career titles: 0
- Highest ranking: No. 186 (10 January 2000)

Grand Slam singles results
- French Open: 1R (1999)

Doubles
- Career record: 0–1
- Career titles: 0
- Highest ranking: No. 342 (28 August 1995)

Héctor Moretti (born 27 January 1973) is a former professional tennis player from Argentina.

== Career ==
Moretti's only Grand Slam appearance was in the 1999 French Open, which he qualified for with wins over Dirk Dier, Oscar Serrano and Mikael Tillström. In the first round he played 16th seed Thomas Enqvist, who beat him in four sets.

He took part in both the singles and doubles at the 2000 Austrian Open. Puerto Rican José Frontera partnered him in the doubles and they were defeated in the opening round by Adrián García and Fabio Maggi. The Argentine didn't fare any better in the singles, losing his only match to Agustín Calleri.

== Challenger titles ==
=== Singles: (1) ===
No.	Year	Tournament	Surface	Opponent	Score
1.	1999	Edinburgh, Great Britain	Clay	(Hungary) Attila Sávolt	6–4, 6–1
