= 1999 French Open – Girls' doubles =

Girls' doubles
- 1999 French Open

Final
- Champions: (Italy) Flavia Pennetta (Italy) Roberta Vinci
- Runners-up: (Germany) Mia Buric (Belgium) Kim Clijsters
- Score: 7–5, 5–7, 6–4

Events
Singles	men	women		boys	girls
Doubles	men	women	mixed	boys	girls
WC Singles	men	women	quad
WC Doubles	men	women	quad
Legends	−45	45+	women
← 1998 ·	French Open	· 2000 →

Kim Clijsters and Jelena Dokić were the defending champions, but only Clijsters competed with year with Mia Buric

Buric and Clijsters reached the final, but they were defeated by the Italian pairing of Flavia Pennetta and Roberta Vinci, 7–5, 5–7, 6–4.

== Draw ==
=== Key ===
- Q = Qualifier
- WC = Wild card
- LL = Lucky loser
- Alt = Alternate
- SE = Special exempt
- PR = Protected ranking
- ITF = ITF entry
- JE = Junior exempt
- w/o = Walkover
- r = Retired
- d = Defaulted
- SR = Special ranking

=== Finals ===
Semifinals
(Spain) Lourdes Domínguez Lino (Spain) Marta Marrero	2	4
(Germany) Mia Buric (Belgium) Kim Clijsters	6	6
(Italy) Laura Dell'Angelo (Croatia) Dora Krstulović	6	3
(Italy) Flavia Pennetta (Italy) Roberta Vinci	7	6

Final
(Germany) Mia Buric (Belgium) Kim Clijsters	5	7	4
(Italy) Flavia Pennetta (Italy) Roberta Vinci	7	5	6

=== Top half ===
First round
(Czech Republic) D Bedáňová (Argentina) ME Salerni	3	2
(France) S Foretz (France) L Sanchez	6	6
(Germany) S Werner (Russia) L Krasnoroutskaya	6	6
(Romania) I Gașpar (Romania) M Moldovan	4	2
(Slovakia) L Dlhopolcová (Slovakia) Ľ Kurhajcová	6	7
(Croatia) I Abramović (Australia) S Stosur	2	5
(France) C Carlotti (France) S Rizzi	0	1
(Spain) L Domínguez Lino (Spain) M Marrero	6	6
(France) S Schoeffel (Uzbekistan) I Tulyaganova	7	6
(Italy) ME Camerin (Italy) N Viérin	6	2
(Australia) M Dowse (Netherlands) M Gerards	6	4	6
(Slovenia) N Culum (United States) J Scaringe	1	6	2
(Austria) B Hellwig (Austria) B Resch	2	6	2
(Slovakia) M Babáková (Chile) V Castro	6	4	6
(Switzerland) L Bao (Switzerland) C Charbonnier	5	2
(Germany) M Buric (Belgium) K Clijsters	7	6

Second round
(France) S Foretz (France) L Sanchez	6	6
(Germany) S Werner (Russia) L Krasnoroutskaya	1	4
(Slovakia) L Dlhopolcová (Slovakia) Ľ Kurhajcová	3	4
(Spain) L Domínguez Lino (Spain) M Marrero	6	6
(France) S Schoeffel (Uzbekistan) I Tulyaganova	2	6	6
(Australia) M Dowse (Netherlands) M Gerards	6	2	3
(Slovakia) M Babáková (Chile) V Castro	6	2	0
(Germany) M Buric (Belgium) K Clijsters	0	6	6

Quarterfinals
(France) S Foretz (France) L Sanchez	1	0	r
(Spain) L Domínguez Lino (Spain) M Marrero	6	1
(France) S Schoeffel (Uzbekistan) I Tulyaganova	1	6
(Germany) M Buric (Belgium) K Clijsters	6	7

Semifinals
(Spain) L Domínguez Lino (Spain) M Marrero	2	4
(Germany) M Buric (Belgium) K Clijsters	6	6

=== Bottom half ===
First round
(Australia) M Adamczak (Australia) S Stone	6	7
(Czech Republic) I Benešová (Czech Republic) E Birnerová	4	5
(United States) A Cargill (United States) L Granville	6	6
(France) A Dulon (Mexico) Z Reyes	3	3
(Argentina) G Dulko (Russia) G Fokina	6	3
(Italy) L Dell'Angelo (Croatia) D Krstulović	7	6
(France) M Malouli (France) O Sanchez	0	2
(South Africa) N Grandin (South Africa) A Mojzis	6	6
(Slovakia) K Bašternáková (Czech Republic) D Luzarová	5	0
(Hungary) A Kapros (France) V Razzano	7	6
(Germany) C-A Basu (Germany) M Müller	6	4	6
(United Kingdom) H Collin (Slovenia) T Hergold	1	6	2
(France) C Pin (France) A Védy	6	6	8
(Spain) A Medina Garrigues (Russia) A Rodionova	4	7	6
(Italy) F Pennetta (Italy) R Vinci	7	6
(Argentina) E Krauth (Argentina) V Krauth	6	4

Second round
(Australia) M Adamczak (Australia) S Stone	4	0
(United States) A Cargill (United States) L Granville	6	6
(Italy) L Dell'Angelo (Croatia) D Krstulović	6	6
(South Africa) N Grandin (South Africa) A Mojzis	2	2
(Hungary) A Kapros (France) V Razzano	6	6	6
(United Kingdom) H Collin (Slovenia) T Hergold	1	2	4
(France) C Pin (France) A Védy	4	7	1
(Italy) F Pennetta (Italy) R Vinci	6	5	6

Quarterfinals
(United States) A Cargill (United States) L Granville	7	3	9
(Italy) L Dell'Angelo (Croatia) D Krstulović	5	6	11
(Hungary) A Kapros (France) V Razzano	3	3
(Italy) F Pennetta (Italy) R Vinci	6	6

Semifinals
(Italy) L Dell'Angelo (Croatia) D Krstulović	6	3
(Italy) F Pennetta (Italy) R Vinci	7	6
