= 1999 French Open – Boys' singles =

Boys' singles
- 1999 French Open

Final
- Champion: (Argentina) Guillermo Coria
- Runner-up: (Argentina) David Nalbandian
- Score: 6–4, 6–3

Events
Singles	men	women		boys	girls
Doubles	men	women	mixed	boys	girls
WC Singles	men	women	quad
WC Doubles	men	women	quad
Legends	−45	45+	women
← 1998 ·	French Open	· 2000 →

Fernando González was the defending champion, but did not compete this year.

Argentine Guillermo Coria won the tournament without dropping a set, defeating compatriot David Nalbandian in the final, 6–4, 6–3.

== Draw ==
=== Key ===
- Q = Qualifier
- WC = Wild card
- LL = Lucky loser
- Alt = Alternate
- SE = Special exempt
- PR = Protected ranking
- ITF = ITF entry
- JE = Junior exempt
- w/o = Walkover
- r = Retired
- d = Defaulted
- SR = Special ranking

=== Finals ===
Quarterfinals
(Spain) Tommy Robredo	7	6
(Bulgaria) Todor Enev	5	4
(Argentina) David Nalbandian	6	4	6
(France) Éric Prodon	4	6	4
(Argentina) Guillermo Coria	7	7
(Georgia (country)) Irakli Labadze	6	6
(Russia) Igor Kunitsyn	6	7
(Spain) Feliciano López	4	6

Semifinals
(Spain) Tommy Robredo	3	2
(Argentina) David Nalbandian	6	6
(Argentina) Guillermo Coria	6	6
(Russia) Igor Kunitsyn	3	4

Final
(Argentina) David Nalbandian	4	3
(Argentina) Guillermo Coria	6	6

=== Top half ===
==== Section 1 ====
First round
(Spain) Tommy Robredo	3	6	7
(Argentina) Cristian Villagrán	6	2	5
Q	(France) Julien Cassaigne	6	6
(Federal Republic of Yugoslavia) Boris Pašanski	3	0
Q	(Chile) Phillip Harboe	3	2
(France) Olivier Ramos	6	6
(United States) Mardy Fish	7	3	6
(Belgium) Olivier Rochus	5	6	2
(Brazil) Thiago Alves	3	1
(Bulgaria) Todor Enev	6	6
(Japan) Hayato Furukawa	3	4
(Germany) Dominik Meffert	6	6
(Romania) Cătălin Gârd	3	3
(France) Julien Benneteau	6	6
Q	(Russia) Sergei Pozdnev	1	0
(Italy) Filippo Volandri	6	6

Second round
(Spain) T Robredo	6	6
Q	(France) J Cassaigne	1	3
(France) O Ramos	2	5
(United States) M Fish	6	7
(Bulgaria) T Enev	6	6
(Germany) D Meffert	3	2
(France) J Benneteau	1	4
(Italy) F Volandri	6	6

Third round
(Spain) T Robredo	7	6
(United States) M Fish	6	0
(Bulgaria) T Enev	1	6	6
(Italy) F Volandri	6	4	0

Quarterfinals
(Spain) T Robredo	7	6
(Bulgaria) T Enev	5	4

==== Section 2 ====
First round
(Argentina) David Nalbandian	6	6
LL	(Brazil) Diogo Cruz	3	1
(South Africa) Andrew McDade	2	5
(France) François Vatin	6	7
(Switzerland) Michael Lammer	4	6	4
Q	(Belarus) Sergey Vassine	6	2	6
(Sweden) Joachim Johansson	4	2
(Croatia) Lovro Zovko	6	6
(Finland) Jarkko Nieminen	6	6
(United States) Andy Roddick	3	0
(Mexico) Daniel Langre	3	4
(Netherlands) Fred Hemmes Jr.	6	6
(Slovakia) Karol Beck	3	6	6
(United Kingdom) Simon Dickson	6	2	1
(Czech Republic) Jakub Hašek	3	2
(France) Éric Prodon	6	6

Second round
(Argentina) D Nalbandian	4	7	10
(France) F Vatin	6	5	8
Q	(Belarus) S Vassine	7	2	0
(Croatia) L Zovko	6	6	6
(Finland) J Nieminen	6	6
(Netherlands) F Hemmes Jr.	2	4
(Slovakia) K Beck	4	4
(France) É Prodon	6	6

Third round
(Argentina) D Nalbandian	6	6
(Croatia) L Zovko	4	2
(Finland) J Nieminen	5	5
(France) É Prodon	7	7

Quarterfinals
(Argentina) D Nalbandian	6	4	6
(France) É Prodon	4	6	4

=== Bottom half ===
==== Section 3 ====
First round
(Argentina) Guillermo Coria	6	6
(Netherlands Antilles) Jean-Julien Rojer	1	4
(Belarus) Vitali Chvets	6	6
(France) Julien Maes	4	2
(Hong Kong) Wong Wing-luen	1	5
(Czech Republic) Ladislav Chramosta	6	7
(Chile) Julio Peralta	5	0
(Venezuela) José de Armas	7	6
(Belgium) Stefan Wauters	6	4	7
(France) Jean-Christophe Faurel	4	6	5
(Croatia) Mario Ančić	6	7
(United States) Levar Harper-Griffith	1	6
(Italy) Francesco Aldi	6	6
Q	(France) Christophe de Veaux	3	3
Q	(Sweden) Filip Prpic	7	1	1
(Georgia (country)) Irakli Labadze	6	6	6

Second round
(Argentina) G Coria	6	6
(Belarus) V Chvets	2	1
(Czech Republic) L Chramosta	3	4
(Venezuela) J de Armas	6	6
(Belgium) S Wauters	4	1
(Croatia) M Ančić	6	6
(Italy) F Aldi	3	4
(Georgia (country)) I Labadze	6	6

Third round
(Argentina) G Coria	6	7
(Venezuela) J de Armas	2	5
(Croatia) M Ančić	4	4
(Georgia (country)) I Labadze	6	6

Quarterfinals
(Argentina) G Coria	7	7
(Georgia (country)) I Labadze	6	6

==== Section 4 ====
First round
(Russia) Igor Kunitsyn	6	6
(Federal Republic of Yugoslavia) Aleksander Vlaski	2	1
(Finland) Timo Nieminen	7	5	6
Q	(Norway) Stian Boretti	6	7	3
(Argentina) Antonio Pastorino	6	6
(France) Nicolas Mahut	4	3
(Austria) Markus Polessnig	6	4
(Italy) Uros Vico	7	6
(Spain) Feliciano López	6	3	17
(France) Thierry Ascione	4	6	15
(United States) David Martin	5	6	4
Q	(Sweden) Jonas Fröberg	7	3	6
(Germany) Maximilian Abel	6	5
(France) Florent Serra	7	7
(Croatia) Roko Karanušić	7	2	3
(Denmark) Kristian Pless	6	6	6

Second round
(Russia) I Kunitsyn	3	6	6
(Finland) T Nieminen	6	2	3
(Argentina) A Pastorino	4	1
(Italy) U Vico	6	6
(Spain) F López	7	6
Q	(Sweden) J Fröberg	6	3
(France) F Serra	6	1	4
(Denmark) K Pless	3	6	6

Third round
(Russia) I Kunitsyn	7	3	6
(Italy) U Vico	6	6	7^{r}
(Spain) F López	6	3	12
(Denmark) K Pless	4	6	10

Quarterfinals
(Russia) I Kunitsyn	6	7
(Spain) F López	4	6
