= Axel Pretzsch =

German tennis player

- Country (sports): Germany
- Born: 16 June 1976 (age 48); Hamburg, West Germany
- Height: 6 ft 1 in (185 cm)
- Turned pro: 1996
- Plays: Right-handed (two-handed backhand)
- Prize money: $336,815

Singles
- Career record: 11–25
- Career titles: 0
- Highest ranking: No. 99 (14 January 2002)

Grand Slam singles results
- Australian Open: 2R (2000)
- French Open: 1R (1999)
- Wimbledon: Q2 (1999, 2002)
- US Open: 2R (1999)

Doubles
- Career record: 0–0
- Career titles: 0
- Highest ranking: No. 318 (7 April 2003)
- Last updated on: 1 February 2022.

Axel Pretzsch (born 16 June 1976) is a former professional tennis player from Germany.

== Career ==
Pretzsch, who was Germany's junior champion in 1990 and 1994, played in the main draw of four Grand Slams during his career. He twice made it into the second round, the first time at the 1999 US Open, where he beat Cyril Saulnier, before losing to eventual champion Andre Agassi. The German also reached the second round in the 2000 Australian Open, beating Alex O'Brien.

His best result on the ATP Tour came at the 1999 President's Cup in Tashkent, where he had to best win of his career, defeating world number 60 Sargis Sargsian en route to the quarter-finals.

== ATP Challenger and ITF Futures finals ==
=== Singles: 11 (6–5) ===
| Legend ATP Challenger (6–4) ITF Futures (0–1) | Finals by surface Hard (2–0) Clay (0–1) Grass (0–0) Carpet (4–4) |

| Result | W–L | Date | Tournament | Tier | Surface | Opponent | Score |
|---|---|---|---|---|---|---|---|
| Loss | 0-1 | Jul 1998 | Denmark F3, Svendborg | Futures | Clay | (Sweden) Johan Settergren | 5–7, 1–6 |
| Loss | 0-2 | Feb 1999 | Hamburg, Germany | Challenger | Carpet | (Belarus) Vladimir Voltchkov | 6–4, 3–6, 6–7 |
| Win | 1-2 | Feb 1999 | Wolfsburg, Germany | Challenger | Carpet | (Italy) Diego Nargiso | walkover |
| Win | 2-2 | Feb 1999 | Lübeck, Germany | Challenger | Carpet | (Germany) Michael Kohlmann | 7–6, 6–4 |
| Loss | 2-3 | Mar 1999 | Magdeburg, Germany | Challenger | Carpet | (Germany) Markus Hantschk | 6–3, 6–7, 4–6 |
| Win | 3-3 | Feb 2001 | Wroclaw, Poland | Challenger | Hard | (France) Antony Dupuis | 7–5, 7–6^{(7–1)} |
| Win | 4-3 | Mar 2001 | Magdeburg, Germany | Challenger | Carpet | (Austria) Clemens Trimmel | 6–4, 6–4 |
| Win | 5-3 | Jul 2001 | Granby, Canada | Challenger | Hard | (United States) Jeff Morrison | 6–7^{(5–7)}, 6–3, 6–4 |
| Loss | 5-4 | Nov 2001 | Aachen, Germany | Challenger | Carpet | (Germany) Alexander Popp | 3–6, 6–1, 2–6 |
| Loss | 5-5 | Mar 2002 | Magdeburg, Germany | Challenger | Carpet | (Belgium) Dick Norman | 6–7^{(6–8)}, 6–3, 4–6 |
| Win | 6-5 | Feb 2003 | Wolfsburg, Germany | Challenger | Carpet | (United Kingdom) Arvind Parmar | 6–7^{(1–7)}, 7–6^{(7–5)}, 6–4 |

=== Doubles: 1 (1–0) ===
| Legend ATP Challenger (1–0) ITF Futures (0–0) | Finals by surface Hard (0–0) Clay (0–0) Grass (0–0) Carpet (1–0) |

| Result | W–L | Date | Tournament | Tier | Surface | Partner | Opponents | Score |
|---|---|---|---|---|---|---|---|---|
| Win | 1–0 | Feb 2003 | Wolfsburg, Germany | Challenger | Carpet | (Germany) Karsten Braasch | (Austria) Alexander Peya (Pakistan) Aisam Qureshi | 6–4, 6–2 |

== Performance timeline ==
Key
| W | F | SF | QF | #R | RR | Q# | DNQ | A | NH |

(W) winner; (F) finalist; (SF) semifinalist; (QF) quarterfinalist; (#R) rounds 4, 3, 2, 1; (RR) round-robin stage; (Q#) qualification round; (DNQ) did not qualify; (A) absent; (NH) not held; (SR) strike rate (events won / competed); (W–L) win–loss record.

=== Singles ===
| Tournament | 1994 | 1995 | 1996 | 1997 | 1998 | 1999 | 2000 | 2001 | 2002 | SR | W–L | Win% |
|---|---|---|---|---|---|---|---|---|---|---|---|---|
Grand Slam tournaments
| Australian Open | A | A | A | A | A | A | 2R | A | 1R | 0 / 2 | 1–2 | 33% |
| French Open | A | A | A | A | A | 1R | Q1 | Q3 | Q2 | 0 / 1 | 0–1 | 0% |
| Wimbledon | A | A | A | Q1 | A | Q2 | Q1 | Q1 | Q2 | 0 / 0 | 0–0 | – |
| US Open | A | A | A | A | A | 2R | A | Q2 | A | 0 / 1 | 1–1 | 50% |
| Win–loss | 0–0 | 0–0 | 0–0 | 0–0 | 0–0 | 1–2 | 1–1 | 0–0 | 0–1 | 0 / 4 | 2–4 | 33% |
ATP World Tour Masters 1000
| Hamburg | Q1 | A | A | Q2 | Q2 | A | Q2 | 1R | A | 0 / 1 | 0–1 | 0% |
| Canada | A | A | A | A | A | 2R | A | A | A | 0 / 1 | 0–1 | 0% |
| Cincinnati | A | A | A | A | A | 1R | A | A | A | 0 / 1 | 0–1 | 0% |
| Stuttgart | A | A | A | A | A | A | A | 2R | NMS | 0 / 1 | 1–1 | 50% |
| Win–loss | 0–0 | 0–0 | 0–0 | 0–0 | 0–0 | 0–2 | 0–0 | 1–2 | 0–0 | 0 / 4 | 1–4 | 20% |
