= 1999 French Open – Girls' singles =

Girls' singles
- 1999 French Open

Final
- Champion: (Spain) Lourdes Domínguez Lino
- Runner-up: (France) Stéphanie Foretz
- Score: 6–4, 6–4

Events
Singles	men	women		boys	girls
Doubles	men	women	mixed	boys	girls
WC Singles	men	women	quad
WC Doubles	men	women	quad
Legends	−45	45+	women
- French Open

The 1999 French Open girls' singles was a tennis tournament that took place on the outdoor clay courts at the Stade Roland Garros in Paris, France.

Nadia Petrova was the defending champion, but did not compete.

Lourdes Domínguez Lino won the title defeating Stéphanie Foretz in the final, 6–4, 6–4.

== Draw ==
Key

- Q = Qualifier
- WC = Wild card
- LL = Lucky loser
- Alt = Alternate
- ITF = ITF entry
- PR = Protected ranking
- SR = Special ranking
- SE = Special exempt
- JE = Junior exempt
- JR = Junior Accelerator Programme entrant
- CO = College Accelerator Programme entrant
- NG = Next Gen Accelerator Program entrant
- w/o = Walkover
- r = Retired
- d = Defaulted

=== Finals ===
Quarterfinals
(France) Virginie Razzano	6	7	7
(Russia) Galina Fokina	2	5	5
(Spain) Lourdes Domínguez Lino	6	6
(Netherlands) Michelle Gerards	4	1
(Russia) Lina Krasnoroutskaya	1	6	6
(Belgium) Kim Clijsters	6	4	4
(Spain) Marta Marrero	3	3
(France) Stéphanie Foretz	6	6

Semifinals
(France) Virginie Razzano	2	1
(Spain) Lourdes Domínguez Lino	6	6
(Russia) Lina Krasnoroutskaya	4	5
(France) Stéphanie Foretz	6	7

Final
(Spain) Lourdes Domínguez Lino	6	6
(France) Stéphanie Foretz	4	4

=== Top half ===
==== Section 1 ====
First round
(France) Virginie Razzano	6	7
Q	(South Africa) Natalie Grandin	1	5
(United States) Ansley Cargill	1	7	6
(Australia) Monique Adamczak	6	5	4
(Argentina) Erica Krauth	6	6
(Chile) Valentina Castro	3	4
(United Kingdom) Hannah Collin	6	2	2
(Czech Republic) Dája Bedáňová	2	6	6
(Slovakia) Katarína Bašternáková	5	6
LL	(France) Samantha Schoeffel	7	7
(Russia) Galina Fokina	3	6	7
Q	(Germany) Caroline-Ann Basu	6	3	5
(Spain) Anabel Medina Garrigues	6	6
(Italy) Roberta Vinci	4	2
(Romania) Mihaela Moldovan	4	1
(Uzbekistan) Iroda Tulyaganova	6	6

Second round
(France) V Razzano	6	6	7
(United States) A Cargill	7	1	5
(Argentina) E Krauth	2	6	3
(Czech Republic) D Bedáňová	6	3	6
LL	(France) S Schoeffel	3	6	2
(Russia) G Fokina	6	3	6
(Spain) A Medina Garrigues	7	5	3
(Uzbekistan) I Tulyaganova	6	7	6

Third round
(France) V Razzano	6	6
(Czech Republic) D Bedáňová	2	2
(Russia) G Fokina	6	6
(Uzbekistan) I Tulyaganova	4	1

Quarterfinals
(France) V Razzano	6	7	7
(Russia) G Fokina	2	5	5

==== Section 2 ====
First round
(Spain) Lourdes Domínguez Lino	6	6
(Slovakia) Martina Babáková	1	4
(France) Olivia Sanchez	6	6
(Italy) Nathalie Viérin	2	2
Q	(Slovenia) Nives Culum	3	7	1
(Austria) Bettina Resch	6	6	6
Q	(Mexico) Zerene Reyes	3	3
(Germany) Scarlett Werner	6	6
(Switzerland) Laura Bao	6	6
(France) Aurélie Védy	4	1
(Netherlands) Michelle Gerards	3	6	6
(Argentina) Gisela Dulko	6	0	2
(Czech Republic) Iveta Benešová	3	2
(Italy) Maria Elena Camerin	6	6
(Croatia) Ivana Abramović	3	4
(Russia) Elena Bovina	6	6

Second round
(Spain) L Domínguez Lino	0	6	6
(France) O Sanchez	6	3	3
(Austria) B Resch	5	1
(Germany) S Werner	7	6
(Switzerland) L Bao	6	4
(Netherlands) M Gerards	7	6
(Italy) ME Camerin	3	3
(Russia) E Bovina	6	6

Third round
(Spain) L Domínguez Lino	6	6
(Germany) S Werner	2	3
(Netherlands) M Gerards	6	3	8
(Russia) E Bovina	4	6	6

Quarterfinals
(Spain) L Domínguez Lino	6	6
(Netherlands) M Gerards	4	1

=== Bottom half ===
==== Section 3 ====
First round
(Argentina) ME Salerni	7	6
(France) C Pin	5	4
(Germany) M Buric	7	6
(Croatia) D Krstulović	5	2
(Spain) L Sánchez	6	6
(Slovakia) Ľ Kurhajcová	2	4
(Italy) L Dell'Angelo	4	2
(Russia) L Krasnoroutskaya	6	6
(France) S Lefèvre	4	6	6
(Czech Republic) E Birnerová	6	1	3
(Australia) M Dowse	6	6
(South Africa) A Mojzis	2	1
(Austria) B Hellwig	3	6	4
(Slovenia) T Hergold	6	2	6
Q	(Switzerland) M-G Mikaelian	2	2
(Belgium) K Clijsters	6	6

Second round
(Argentina) ME Salerni	6	6
(Germany) M Buric	3	3
(Spain) L Sánchez	3	2
(Russia) L Krasnoroutskaya	6	6
(France) S Lefèvre	4	2	1
(Australia) M Dowse	6	6	6
(Slovenia) T Hergold	2	1
(Belgium) K Clijsters	6	6

Third round
(Argentina) ME Salerni	7	1	0
(Russia) L Krasnoroutskaya	5	6	6
(Australia) M Dowse	0	0
(Belgium) K Clijsters	6	6

Quarterfinals
(Russia) L Krasnoroutskaya	1	6	6
(Belgium) K Clijsters	6	4	4

==== Section 4 ====
First round
(Spain) M Marrero	6	5	6
(Romania) I Gașpar	0	7	1
(France) M Malouli	2	2
(Switzerland) C Charbonnier	6	6
(Germany) M Müller	6	6
(France) S Rizzi	2	4
Q	(Russia) A Rodionova	2	4
(United States) L Granville	6	6
(Hungary) A Kapros	3	6	6
(Slovakia) L Dlhopolcová	6	0	2
(Argentina) V Krauth	4	3
(Ukraine) J Vakulenko	6	6
Q	(Italy) F Pennetta	3	3
Q	(Russia) E Kozhokhina	6	6
(Czech Republic) D Luzarová	0	2
(France) S Foretz	6	6

Second round
(Spain) M Marrero	6	3	6
(Switzerland) C Charbonnier	4	6	4
(Germany) M Müller	6	1	8
(United States) L Granville	2	6	6
(Hungary) A Kapros	6	6
(Ukraine) J Vakulenko	2	2
Q	(Russia) E Kozhokhina	5	4
(France) S Foretz	7	6

Third round
(Spain) M Marrero	7	6
(Germany) M Müller	5	2
(Hungary) A Kapros	7	3	4
(France) S Foretz	6	6	6

Quarterfinals
(Spain) M Marrero	3	3
(France) S Foretz	6	6
