= 1999 French Open – Boys' doubles =

Boys' doubles
- 1999 French Open

Final
- Champions: (Georgia (country)) Irakli Labadze (Croatia) Lovro Zovko
- Runners-up: (Denmark) Kristian Pless (Belgium) Olivier Rochus
- Score: 6–1, 7–6

Events
Singles	men	women		boys	girls
Doubles	men	women	mixed	boys	girls
WC Singles	men	women	quad
WC Doubles	men	women	quad
Legends	−45	45+	women
- French Open

José de Armas and Fernando González were the defending champions, but only de Armas competed this year with Daniel Langre. They lost in the quarterfinals to Irakli Labadze and Lovro Zovko.

Labadze and Zovko ended up winning the title, defeating Kristian Pless and Olivier Rochus in the final, 6–1, 7–6.

== Draw ==
Key

- Q = Qualifier
- WC = Wild card
- LL = Lucky loser
- Alt = Alternate
- ITF = ITF entry
- PR = Protected ranking
- SR = Special ranking
- SE = Special exempt
- JE = Junior exempt
- JR = Junior Accelerator Programme entrant
- CO = College Accelerator Programme entrant
- NG = Next Gen Accelerator Program entrant
- w/o = Walkover
- r = Retired
- d = Defaulted

=== Finals ===
Semifinals
(Georgia (country)) Irakli Labadze (Croatia) Lovro Zovko	6	4	6
(United Kingdom) Lee Childs (United Kingdom) Simon Dickson	2	6	4
(France) Julien Benneteau (France) Nicolas Mahut	1	7	3
(Denmark) Kristian Pless (Belgium) Olivier Rochus	6	6	6

Final
(Georgia (country)) Irakli Labadze (Croatia) Lovro Zovko	6	7
(Denmark) Kristian Pless (Belgium) Olivier Rochus	1	6

=== Top half ===
First round
(Venezuela) José de Armas (Mexico) Daniel Langre	6	6
(United States) David Martin (United States) Timothy Martin	3	3
(France) Jean-Christophe Faurel (France) Éric Prodon	6	6
(Chile) Phillip Harboe (Argentina) Antonio Pastorino	1	2
(Italy) Francesco Aldi (Russia) Igor Kunitsyn	6	4	6
(Sweden) Jonas Fröberg (Sweden) Filip Prpic	3	6	3
(France) Olivier Ramos (France) François Vatin	3	2
(Georgia (country)) Irakli Labadze (Croatia) Lovro Zovko	6	6
(United Kingdom) Lee Childs (United Kingdom) Simon Dickson	6	6
(Slovakia) Karol Beck (Belgium) Stefan Wauters	4	4
(Chile) Julio Peralta (Argentina) Cristian Villagrán	1	1
(Czech Republic) Jakub Hašek (Slovenia) Andrej Kračman	6	6
(France) Julien Cassaigne (France) Christophe de Veaux	2	4
(Italy) Uros Vico (Italy) Filippo Volandri	6	6
(Bulgaria) Todor Enev (Finland) Jarkko Nieminen	0	4
(Spain) Feliciano López (Spain) Tommy Robredo	6	6

Second round
(Venezuela) J de Armas (Mexico) D Langre	6	7
(France) J-C Faurel (France) É Prodon	3	6
(Italy) F Aldi (Russia) I Kunitsyn	2	3
(Georgia (country)) I Labadze (Croatia) L Zovko	6	6
(United Kingdom) L Childs (United Kingdom) S Dickson	6	6
(Czech Republic) J Hašek (Slovenia) A Kračman	4	3
(Italy) U Vico (Italy) F Volandri	6	6	6
(Spain) F López (Spain) T Robredo	7	3	4

Quarterfinals
(Venezuela) J de Armas (Mexico) D Langre	3	3
(Georgia (country)) I Labadze (Croatia) L Zovko	6	6
(United Kingdom) L Childs (United Kingdom) S Dickson	6	6
(Italy) U Vico (Italy) F Volandri	2	4

Semifinals
(Georgia (country)) I Labadze (Croatia) L Zovko	6	4	6
(United Kingdom) L Childs (United Kingdom) S Dickson	2	6	4

=== Bottom half ===
First round
(France) Julien Benneteau (France) Nicolas Mahut	6	6	7
(Belarus) Vitali Chvets (Belarus) Sergey Vassine	7	0	5
(Norway) Stian Boretti (Jamaica) Ryan Russell	6	6
(South Africa) Andrew McDade (South Africa) Dirk Stegmann	4	2
(Italy) Cesare de Faveri (Federal Republic of Yugoslavia) Aleksander Vlaski	6	6
(Croatia) Mario Ančić (Croatia) Roko Karanušić	1	1
(France) Olivier Ramos (France) François Vatin	4	6
(Czech Republic) Ladislav Chramosta (Czech Republic) Michal Navrátil	6	7
(Denmark) Kristian Pless (Belgium) Olivier Rochus	6	6	6
(United States) Levar Harper-Griffith (United States) Andy Roddick	7	2	4
(Romania) Cătălin Gârd (Netherlands Antilles) Jean-Julien Rojer	6	6
(Japan) Hayato Furukawa (Hong Kong) Wong Wing-luen	4	0
(Netherlands) Fred Hemmes Jr. (Germany) Dominik Meffert	6	6
(France) Thierry Ascione (France) Julien Maes	2	4
(Brazil) Thiago Alves (Finland) Timo Nieminen	1	2
(Argentina) Guillermo Coria (Argentina) David Nalbandian	6	6

Second round
(France) J Benneteau (France) N Mahut	6	7
(Norway) S Boretti (Jamaica) R Russell	3	5
(Italy) C de Faveri (Federal Republic of Yugoslavia) A Vlaski	6	2	6
(Czech Republic) L Chramosta (Czech Republic) M Navrátil	4	6	2
(Denmark) K Pless (Belgium) O Rochus	7	6
(Romania) C Gârd (Netherlands Antilles) J-J Rojer	5	4
(Netherlands) F Hemmes Jr. (Germany) D Meffert	3	2
(Argentina) G Coria (Argentina) D Nalbandian	6	6

Quarterfinals
(France) J Benneteau (France) N Mahut	6	6
(Italy) C de Faveri (Federal Republic of Yugoslavia) A Vlaski	3	1
(Denmark) K Pless (Belgium) O Rochus	6	6
(Argentina) G Coria (Argentina) D Nalbandian	2	3

Semifinals
(France) J Benneteau (France) N Mahut	1	7	3
(Denmark) K Pless (Belgium) O Rochus	6	6	6
