= 1999 French Open – Women's doubles =

Women's doubles
- 1999 French Open

Final
- Champions: (United States) Serena Williams (United States) Venus Williams
- Runners-up: (Switzerland) Martina Hingis (Russia) Anna Kournikova
- Score: 6–3, 6–7^{(2–7)}, 8–6

Details
- Draw: 64 (3 WC )
- Seeds: 16

Events
Singles	men	women		boys	girls
Doubles	men	women	mixed	boys	girls
WC Singles	men	women	quad
WC Doubles	men	women	quad
Legends	−45	45+	women
← 1998 ·	French Open	· 2000 →

Serena and Venus Williams defeated Martina Hingis and Anna Kournikova in the final, 6–3, 6–7^{(2–7)}, 8–6 to win the women's doubles tennis title at the 1999 French Open. It was the first major title for the Williams sisters, and would be their first step towards completing the career Golden Slam in doubles.

Hingis and Jana Novotná were the defending champions, but they did not compete together this year. Novotná partnered Natasha Zvereva as the first seed, but they retired in their quarterfinal match against Lindsay Davenport and Mary Pierce.

== Seeds ==
1. (Czech Republic) Jana Novotná / (Belarus) Natasha Zvereva (quarterfinals, retired)
2. (Switzerland) Martina Hingis / (Russia) Anna Kournikova (final)
3. (United States) Lisa Raymond / (Australia) Rennae Stubbs (first round)
4. (France) Alexandra Fusai / (France) Nathalie Tauziat (semifinals)
5. (Russia) Elena Likhovtseva / (Japan) Ai Sugiyama (quarterfinals)
6. (South Africa) Mariaan de Swardt / (Ukraine) Elena Tatarkova (first round)
7. (Latvia) Larisa Neiland / (Spain) Arantxa Sánchez Vicario (quarterfinals)
8. (Romania) Irina Spîrlea / (Netherlands) Caroline Vis (first round)
9. (United States) Serena Williams / (United States) Venus Williams (champions)
10. (Spain) Conchita Martínez / (Argentina) Patricia Tarabini (third round)
11. (United States) Mary Joe Fernández / (United States) Monica Seles (second round)
12. (United States) Lindsay Davenport / (France) Mary Pierce (semifinals)
13. (Austria) Barbara Schett / (Switzerland) Patty Schnyder (third round)
14. (Italy) Silvia Farina / (Slovakia) Karina Habšudová (third round)
15. (Argentina) Florencia Labat / (Belgium) Dominique Van Roost (third round)
16. (Australia) Kristine Kunce / (United States) Kimberly Po (first round)

== Draw ==
=== Key ===
- Q = Qualifier
- WC = Wild card
- LL = Lucky loser
- Alt = Alternate
- SE = Special exempt
- PR = Protected ranking
- ITF = ITF entry
- JE = Junior exempt
- w/o = Walkover
- r = Retired
- d = Defaulted
- SR = Special ranking

=== Finals ===
Quarterfinals
1	(Czech Republic) Jana Novotná (Belarus) Natasha Zvereva	3^{r}
12	(United States) Lindsay Davenport (France) Mary Pierce	2
9	(United States) Serena Williams (United States) Venus Williams	6	7
(Belgium) Els Callens (Italy) Rita Grande	0	5
5	(Russia) Elena Likhovtseva (Japan) Ai Sugiyama	6	4	9
4	(France) Alexandra Fusai (France) Nathalie Tauziat	2	6	11
7	(Latvia) Larisa Neiland (Spain) Arantxa Sánchez Vicario	2	3
2	(Switzerland) Martina Hingis (Russia) Anna Kournikova	6	6

Semifinals
12	(United States) Lindsay Davenport (France) Mary Pierce	4	1
9	(United States) Serena Williams (United States) Venus Williams	6	6
4	(France) Alexandra Fusai (France) Nathalie Tauziat	3	6	4
2	(Switzerland) Martina Hingis (Russia) Anna Kournikova	6	3	6

Final
9	(United States) Serena Williams (United States) Venus Williams	6	6^{2}	8
2	(Switzerland) Martina Hingis (Russia) Anna Kournikova	3	7^{7}	6

=== Top half ===
==== Section 1 ====
First round
1	(Czech Republic) J Novotná (Belarus) N Zvereva	5
(France) J Halard-Decugis (France) A Mauresmo	4^{r}
WC	(France) S Foretz (France) S Schoeffel	3	3
(United States) N Arendt (Netherlands) M Bollegraf	6	6
(Romania) C Cristea (Romania) R Dragomir	7	6
(Russia) E Kulikovskaya (Ukraine) O Lugina	5	3
(South Africa) E de Villiers (Japan) R Hiraki	6^{1}	0
13	(Austria) B Schett (Switzerland) P Schnyder	7^{7}	6
12	(United States) L Davenport (France) M Pierce	6	6^{6}	6
(United States) K Adams (United States) C Rubin	3	7^{8}	2
(United States) E deLone (Australia) N Pratt	6	6
(South Korea) Kim E-h (Thailand) T Tanasugarn	0	2
(Chinese Taipei) J Lee (Chinese Taipei) Wang S-t	3	6	1
(Spain) A Ortuño (Spain) C Torrens Valero	6	2	6
(Canada) M Drake (South Africa) J Steck	6	1	8
8	(Romania) I Spîrlea (Netherlands) C Vis	3	6	6

Second round
1	(Czech Republic) J Novotná (Belarus) N Zvereva	3	6	6
(United States) N Arendt (Netherlands) M Bollegraf	6	1	4
(Romania) C Cristea (Romania) R Dragomir	4	2
13	(Austria) B Schett (Switzerland) P Schnyder	6	6
12	(United States) L Davenport (France) M Pierce	5	6	6
(United States) E deLone (Australia) N Pratt	7	0	3
(Spain) A Ortuño (Spain) C Torrens Valero	6	4	6
(Canada) M Drake (South Africa) J Steck	4	6	4

Third round
1	(Czech Republic) J Novotná (Belarus) N Zvereva	6	6
13	(Austria) B Schett (Switzerland) P Schnyder	2	2
12	(United States) L Davenport (France) M Pierce	6	6
(Spain) A Ortuño (Spain) C Torrens Valero	1	4

Quarterfinals
1	(Czech Republic) J Novotná (Belarus) N Zvereva	3^{r}
12	(United States) L Davenport (France) M Pierce	2

==== Section 2 ====
First round
3	(United States) L Raymond (Australia) R Stubbs	4	3
(Brazil) V Menga (Germany) E Wagner	6	6
(Australia) C Barclay (Australia) K-A Guse	6	6
(Australia) L Pleming (Australia) B Stewart	2	1
(Hungary) K Marosi (Spain) M Ramón Climent	2	2
(United States) A Frazier (United States) K Schlukebir	6	6
(South Africa) A Coetzer (Argentina) I Gorrochategui	2	3
9	(United States) S Williams (United States) V Williams	6	6
16	(Australia) K Kunce (United States) K Po	6	4	4
(Czech Republic) L Němečková (Slovakia) R Zrubáková	3	6	6
(Netherlands) B Schultz-McCarthy (United States) L Wild	6^{5}	1
(Belgium) L Courtois (United States) M Shaughnessy	7^{7}	6
(Belgium) E Callens (Italy) R Grande	6	6
(Germany) C Singer (Czech Republic) H Vildová	4	2
(Australia) A Molik (United States) C Morariu	3	7	7
6	(South Africa) M de Swardt (Ukraine) E Tatarkova	6	5	5

Second round
(Brazil) V Menga (Germany) E Wagner	7	7^{7}
(Australia) C Barclay (Australia) K-A Guse	5	6^{5}
(United States) A Frazier (United States) K Schlukebir	3	2
9	(United States) S Williams (United States) V Williams	6	6
(Czech Republic) L Němečková (Slovakia) R Zrubáková	0	2
(Belgium) L Courtois (United States) M Shaughnessy	6	6
(Belgium) E Callens (Italy) R Grande	0	6	6
(Australia) A Molik (United States) C Morariu	6	4	2

Third round
(Brazil) V Menga (Germany) E Wagner	1	3
9	(United States) S Williams (United States) V Williams	6	6
(Belgium) L Courtois (United States) M Shaughnessy	6^{3}	6^{7}
(Belgium) E Callens (Italy) R Grande	7^{7}	7^{9}

Quarterfinals
9	(United States) S Williams (United States) V Williams	6	7
(Belgium) E Callens (Italy) R Grande	0	5

=== Bottom half ===
==== Section 3 ====
First round
5	(Russia) E Likhovtseva (Japan) A Sugiyama	7	6
(Sweden) Å Carlsson (France) É Loit	5	2
(Italy) L Golarsa (Slovakia) J Husárová	6	6
(Canada) S Jeyaseelan (Czech Republic) E Melicharová	4	0
(Poland) A Olsza (United States) L Osterloh	6	6^{6}	6
(Australia) A Ellwood (Australia) L McShea	4	7^{8}	4
(United States) D Graham (Argentina) L Montalvo	4	2
14	(Italy) S Farina (Slovakia) K Habšudová	6	6
15	(Argentina) F Labat (Belgium) D Van Roost	7^{7}	6
(Spain) RM Andrés Rodríguez (Spain) E Bes Ostáriz	6^{5}	1
(Australia) R McQuillan (Japan) N Miyagi	6	6^{1}	7
(France) C Dhenin (Croatia) M Murić	4	7^{7}	5
(Japan) M Saeki (Japan) Y Yoshida	6	6^{2}	6
WC	(France) L Ghirardi (France) S Pitkowski	2	7^{7}	3
(Germany) K Freye (Bulgaria) P Stoyanova	4	3
4	(France) A Fusai (France) N Tauziat	6	6

Second round
5	(Russia) E Likhovtseva (Japan) A Sugiyama	7^{7}	2	6
(Italy) L Golarsa (Slovakia) J Husárová	6^{3}	6	3
(Poland) A Olsza (United States) L Osterloh	2	1
14	(Italy) S Farina (Slovakia) K Habšudová	6	6
15	(Argentina) F Labat (Belgium) D Van Roost	6	6
(Australia) R McQuillan (Japan) N Miyagi	2	3
(Japan) M Saeki (Japan) Y Yoshida	4	0
4	(France) A Fusai (France) N Tauziat	6	6

Third round
5	(Russia) E Likhovtseva (Japan) A Sugiyama	7^{7}	6
14	(Italy) S Farina (Slovakia) K Habšudová	6^{3}	0
15	(Argentina) F Labat (Belgium) D Van Roost	1	4
4	(France) A Fusai (France) N Tauziat	6	6

Quarterfinals
5	(Russia) E Likhovtseva (Japan) A Sugiyama	6	4	9
4	(France) A Fusai (France) N Tauziat	2	6	11

==== Section 4 ====
First round
7	(Latvia) L Neiland (Spain) A Sánchez Vicario	6	6
(Belgium) S Appelmans (Netherlands) M Oremans	2	2
(Netherlands) S Noorlander (Greece) C Papadáki	5	7^{7}	6
WC	(France) N Dechy (France) V Razzano	7	6^{4}	2
(Czech Republic) K Hrdličková (Slovenia) T Križan	6	0	6
(Netherlands) K Boogert (France) A-G Sidot	3	6	2
(Zimbabwe) C Black (Kazakhstan) I Selyutina	6^{4}	1
10	(Spain) C Martínez (Argentina) P Tarabini	7^{7}	6
11	(United States) M J Fernández (United States) M Seles	6	6
Alt	(Australia) A Grahame (Australia) T Musgrave	2	0
(Belarus) O Barabanschikova (Germany) B Rittner	6	4	8
(South Africa) L Horn (Slovenia) K Srebotnik	0	6	10
(Spain) V Ruano Pascual (Argentina) P Suárez	6	6
(Hungary) R Kuti-Kis (Germany) C Schneider	0	3
(France) A Cocheteux (France) A Dechaume-Balleret	4	2
2	(Switzerland) M Hingis (Russia) A Kournikova	6	6

Second round
7	(Latvia) L Neiland (Spain) A Sánchez Vicario	6	6
(Netherlands) S Noorlander (Greece) C Papadáki	1	2
(Czech Republic) K Hrdličková (Slovenia) T Križan	5	2
10	(Spain) C Martínez (Argentina) P Tarabini	7	6
11	(United States) M J Fernández (United States) M Seles	6^{5}	7^{7}	4
(South Africa) L Horn (Slovenia) K Srebotnik	7^{7}	6^{3}	6
(Spain) V Ruano Pascual (Argentina) P Suárez	1	4
2	(Switzerland) M Hingis (Russia) A Kournikova	6	6

Third round
7	(Latvia) L Neiland (Spain) A Sánchez Vicario	6	6
10	(Spain) C Martínez (Argentina) P Tarabini	1	4
(South Africa) L Horn (Slovenia) K Srebotnik	6	2	5
2	(Switzerland) M Hingis (Russia) A Kournikova	1	6	7

Quarterfinals
7	(Latvia) L Neiland (Spain) A Sánchez Vicario	2	3
2	(Switzerland) M Hingis (Russia) A Kournikova	6	6
