= 1999 French Open – Women's singles =

Women's singles
- 1999 French Open

Final
- Champion: (Germany) Steffi Graf
- Runner-up: (Switzerland) Martina Hingis
- Score: 4–6, 7–5, 6–2

Details
- Draw: 128
- Seeds: 16

Events
Singles	men	women		boys	girls
Doubles	men	women	mixed	boys	girls
WC Singles	men	women	quad
WC Doubles	men	women	quad
Legends	−45	45+	women
← 1998 ·	French Open	· 2000 →

Steffi Graf defeated Martina Hingis in the final, 4–6, 7–5, 6–2 to win the women's singles tennis title at the 1999 French Open. It was her sixth French Open singles title and Open Era record-extending 22nd and last major singles title, also equaling Chris Evert's record of nine French Open final appearances. Graf became the first player in the Open Era to defeat the top-three ranked players at the same major: downing world No. 2 Lindsay Davenport in the quarterfinals, No. 3 Monica Seles in the semifinals and No. 1 Hingis in the final. Hingis was attempting to complete the career Grand Slam in singles.

Arantxa Sánchez Vicario was the defending champion, but lost to Hingis in the semifinals.

This was the first major appearance for future world No. 1, four-time French Open champion, seven-time major champion, and Olympic gold medalist Justine Henin; she lost in the second round to Davenport.

== Seeds ==
1. (Switzerland) Martina Hingis (final)
2. (United States) Lindsay Davenport (quarterfinals)
3. (United States) Monica Seles (semifinals)
4. (Czech Republic) Jana Novotná (fourth round)
5. (United States) Venus Williams (fourth round)
6. (Germany) Steffi Graf (champion)
7. (Spain) Arantxa Sánchez Vicario (semifinals)
8. (France) Mary Pierce (second round)
9. (France) Nathalie Tauziat (second round)
10. (United States) Serena Williams (third round)
11. (Switzerland) Patty Schnyder (third round)
12. (France) Sandrine Testud (second round)
13. (Belgium) Dominique Van Roost (first round)
14. (South Africa) Amanda Coetzer (first round)
15. (Austria) Barbara Schett (third round)
16. (France) Julie Halard-Decugis (fourth round)

== Draw ==
=== Key ===
- Q = Qualifier
- WC = Wild card
- LL = Lucky loser
- Alt = Alternate
- ITF = ITF entry
- PR = Protected ranking
- SR = Special ranking
- SE = Special exempt
- JE = Junior exempt
- JR = Junior Accelerator Programme entrant
- CO = College Accelerator Programme entrant
- NG = Next Gen Accelerator Program entrant
- w/o = Walkover
- r = Retired
- d = Defaulted

=== Finals ===
Quarterfinals
1	(Switzerland) Martina Hingis	6	6
Q	(Austria) Barbara Schwartz	2	2
(Austria) Sylvia Plischke	2	4
7	(Spain) Arantxa Sánchez Vicario	6	6
(Spain) Conchita Martínez	1	4
3	(United States) Monica Seles	6	6
6	(Germany) Steffi Graf	6	6^{5}	6
2	(United States) Lindsay Davenport	1	7^{7}	3

Semifinals
1	(Switzerland) Martina Hingis	6	6
7	(Spain) Arantxa Sánchez Vicario	3	2
3	(United States) Monica Seles	7^{7}	3	4
6	(Germany) Steffi Graf	6^{2}	6	6

Final
1	(Switzerland) Martina Hingis	6	5	2
6	(Germany) Steffi Graf	4	7	6

=== Top half ===
==== Section 1 ====
First round
1	(Switzerland) M Hingis	6	6
(Netherlands) A Hopmans	1	4
(France) A Mauresmo	6	6
(United States) T Snyder	3	3
(Czech Republic) K Hrdličková	6	6
(Latvia) L Neiland	4	1
(Germany) B Rittner	3	7^{7}	6
(Spain) M Serna	6	6^{5}	2
(Italy) R Grande	6^{0}	1
(Romania) R Dragomir	7^{7}	6
(Canada) M Drake	2	3
(Luxembourg) A Kremer	6	6
Q	(Switzerland) M Vavrinec	0	4
(South Africa) M de Swardt	6	6
Q	(Federal Republic of Yugoslavia) S Načuk	6	3	1
12	(France) S Testud	3	6	6

Second round
1	(Switzerland) M Hingis	6	6
(France) A Mauresmo	3	3
(Czech Republic) K Hrdličková	6	7^{7}
(Germany) B Rittner	4	6^{5}
(Romania) R Dragomir	6	6
(Luxembourg) A Kremer	4	2
(South Africa) M de Swardt	6	6
12	(France) S Testud	3	2

Third round
1	(Switzerland) M Hingis	6	6
(Czech Republic) K Hrdličková	3	4
(Romania) R Dragomir	6	3	6
(South Africa) M de Swardt	2	6	3

Fourth round
1	(Switzerland) M Hingis	6	7^{7}
(Romania) R Dragomir	3	6^{5}

==== Section 2 ====
First round
13	(Belgium) D Van Roost	1	0
Q	(Austria) B Schwartz	6	6
Q	(Hungary) A Földényi	1	4
(Netherlands) K Boogert	6	6
LL	(Russia) E Dementieva	6	6
(Italy) L Golarsa	1	4
WC	(France) S Foretz	7^{16}	6^{1}	1
(France) N Dechy	6^{14}	7^{7}	6
PR	(Netherlands) B Schultz-McCarthy	6	3	2
(Australia) A Molik	3	6	6
WC	(France) E Curutchet	7^{7}	3	11
WC	(Australia) J Dokić	6^{5}	6	9
(Greece) C Papadáki	3	5
(Belarus) N Zvereva	6	7
(France) A Fusai	1	1
5	(United States) V Williams	6	6

Second round
Q	(Austria) B Schwartz	6	6
(Netherlands) K Boogert	2	4
LL	(Russia) E Dementieva	2	6	5
(France) N Dechy	6	1	7
(Australia) A Molik	6	6
WC	(France) E Curutchet	2	2
(Belarus) N Zvereva	6^{3}	0
5	(United States) V Williams	7^{7}	6

Third round
Q	(Austria) B Schwartz	6	6
(France) N Dechy	2	1
(Australia) A Molik	3	1
5	(United States) V Williams	6	6

Fourth round
Q	(Austria) B Schwartz	2	7^{9}	6
5	(United States) V Williams	6	6^{7}	3

==== Section 3 ====
First round
4	(Czech Republic) J Novotná	6	7^{7}
(Slovakia) Ľ Cervanová	2	6^{4}
(Czech Republic) A Gerši	6	6
(Germany) M Weingärtner	4	0
(France) A-G Sidot	3	4
(Croatia) S Talaja	6	6
(United States) C Rubin	6	6
(Netherlands) M Oremans	0	3
(Switzerland) E Gagliardi	6	6
(Australia) N Pratt	2	2
(Austria) S Plischke	6	6
Q	(United States) M Tu	1	1
(Czech Republic) D Chládková	6^{5}	3
(United States) K Po	7^{7}	6
(Slovakia) H Nagyová	1	2
15	(Austria) B Schett	6	6

Second round
4	(Czech Republic) J Novotná	6	6
(Czech Republic) A Gerši	3	2
(Croatia) S Talaja	2	6	6
(United States) C Rubin	6	1	4
(Switzerland) E Gagliardi	1	3
(Austria) S Plischke	6	6
(United States) K Po	3	6	1
15	(Austria) B Schett	6	3	6

Third round
4	(Czech Republic) J Novotná	6	3	6
(Croatia) S Talaja	4	6	4
(Austria) S Plischke	7^{7}	6
15	(Austria) B Schett	6^{1}	4

Fourth round
4	(Czech Republic) J Novotná	3	6^{5}
(Austria) S Plischke	6	7^{7}

==== Section 4 ====
First round
10	(United States) S Williams	6	6
(Belgium) L Courtois	4	0
(Argentina) M Díaz Oliva	6	6
(United States) J Watanabe	0	2
(Russia) T Panova	7^{7}	4	5
WC	(France) L Ghirardi	6^{2}	6	7
(United States) MJ Fernández	6	6
(France) A Dechaume-Balleret	3	2
(Romania) I Spîrlea	6	6
(Romania) C Cristea	4	1
(Belarus) O Barabanschikova	6	3	6
(United States) M Shaughnessy	4	6	1
WC	(France) L Andretto	1	0
(Slovenia) K Srebotnik	6	6
(Croatia) M Lučić	2	2
7	(Spain) A Sánchez Vicario	6	6

Second round
10	(United States) S Williams	6	6
(Argentina) M Díaz Oliva	3	4
WC	(France) L Ghirardi	1	3
(United States) MJ Fernández	6	6
(Romania) I Spîrlea	6	6
(Belarus) O Barabanschikova	3	3
(Slovenia) K Srebotnik	1	2
7	(Spain) A Sánchez Vicario	6	6

Third round
10	(United States) S Williams	3	6	0
(United States) MJ Fernández	6	1	6
(Romania) I Spîrlea	4	1
7	(Spain) A Sánchez Vicario	6	6

Fourth round
(United States) MJ Fernández	w/o
7	(Spain) A Sánchez Vicario

=== Bottom half ===
==== Section 5 ====
First round
8	(France) M Pierce	6	6
(South Africa) J Kruger	4	3
(Zimbabwe) C Black	6	3	3
(Spain) C Martínez	2	6	6
(Chinese Taipei) S-t Wang	4	1
(Belgium) E Callens	6	6
(Canada) S Jeyaseelan	6	1	3
(Israel) A Smashnova	2	6	6
(Slovakia) K Studeníková	3	6	1
(Russia) E Likhovtseva	6	4	6
(France) É Loit	3	2
(Argentina) P Suárez	6	6
(Spain) G León García	6	6
(Hungary) R Kuti-Kis	4	1
(France) A Cocheteux	4	3
9	(France) N Tauziat	6	6

Second round
8	(France) M Pierce	6	3	3
(Spain) C Martínez	4	6	6
(Belgium) E Callens	0	0
(Israel) A Smashnova	6	6
(Russia) E Likhovtseva	6	3	6
(Argentina) P Suárez	2	6	4
(Spain) G León García	6	6
9	(France) N Tauziat	2	4

Third round
(Spain) C Martínez	6	7
(Israel) A Smashnova	2	5
(Russia) E Likhovtseva	6^{3}	6^{3}
(Spain) G León García	7^{7}	7^{7}

Fourth round
(Spain) C Martínez	6	6
(Spain) G León García	2	1

==== Section 6 ====
First round
16	(France) J Halard-Decugis	1	6	6
(Slovakia) K Habšudová	6	4	1
(Germany) E Wagner	6	7^{8}
(United Kingdom) S Smith	1	6^{6}
(Germany) A Glass	6	7
(United States) L Raymond	4	5
(Spain) C Torrens Valero	6	6
WC	(France) S Georges	2	2
(United States) B Rippner	7	4	3
(Romania) R Sandu	5	6	6
(Japan) M Saeki	7^{7}	4	0
(Spain) M Sánchez Lorenzo	6^{4}	6	6
WC	(France) V Razzano	3	4
(Bulgaria) L Bacheva	6	6
(China) F Li	2	4
3	(United States) M Seles	6	6

Second round
16	(France) J Halard-Decugis	4	6	6
(Germany) E Wagner	6	1	2
(Germany) A Glass	4	6	1
(Spain) C Torrens Valero	6	1	6
(Romania) R Sandu	2	1
(Spain) M Sánchez Lorenzo	6	6
(Bulgaria) L Bacheva	3	4
3	(United States) M Seles	6	6

Third round
16	(France) J Halard-Decugis	7	4	6
(Spain) C Torrens Valero	5	6	4
(Spain) M Sánchez Lorenzo	1	4
3	(United States) M Seles	6	6

Fourth round
16	(France) J Halard-Decugis	1	5
3	(United States) M Seles	6	7

==== Section 7 ====
First round
6	(Germany) S Graf	6	6
PR	(Bulgaria) M Maleeva	2	0
Q	(Argentina) I Gorrochategui	3	6	6
(Netherlands) S Noorlander	6	3	2
(Italy) Ad Serra Zanetti	0	6	6
Q	(Bulgaria) P Stoyanova	6	2	4
(Sweden) Å Carlsson	6	7
(Belgium) S Appelmans	2	5
(Russia) A Kournikova	6	6
(Thailand) T Tanasugarn	3	3
(United States) A Frazier	6	6
(Ukraine) E Tatarkova	4	2
(United States) N Arendt	6	7
WC	(France) S Lefèvre	3	5
(United States) C Morariu	6	3	6
11	(Switzerland) P Schnyder	3	6	8

Second round
6	(Germany) S Graf	6	6
Q	(Argentina) I Gorrochategui	2	4
(Italy) Ad Serra Zanetti	3	6^{2}
(Sweden) Å Carlsson	6	7^{7}
(Russia) A Kournikova	6	6
(United States) A Frazier	4	1
(United States) N Arendt	4	2
11	(Switzerland) P Schnyder	6	6

Third round
6	(Germany) S Graf	6	6
(Sweden) Å Carlsson	1	4
(Russia) A Kournikova	6	3	6
11	(Switzerland) P Schnyder	1	6	0

Fourth round
6	(Germany) S Graf	6	7^{7}
(Russia) A Kournikova	3	6^{4}

==== Section 8 ====
First round
14	(South Africa) A Coetzer	5	1
(Japan) A Sugiyama	7	6
(Italy) S Farina	6	7
(Russia) E Kulikovskaya	0	5
(Spain) V Ruano Pascual	2	3
(United States) J Capriati	6	6
(Chinese Taipei) J Lee	4	6	5
(United States) L Osterloh	6	2	7
(Colombia) F Zuluaga	6	7
(France) S Pitkowski	2	5
(Venezuela) M Vento	4	6	0
(Canada) J Nejedly	6	3	6
(United States) K Brandi	4	2
Q	(Belgium) J Henin	6	6
(United States) J Chi	3	1
2	(United States) L Davenport	6	6

Second round
(Japan) A Sugiyama	4	7^{7}	9
(Italy) S Farina	6	6^{4}	11
(United States) J Capriati	6	3	6
(United States) L Osterloh	3	6	2
(Colombia) F Zuluaga	6	6
(Canada) J Nejedly	3	0
Q	(Belgium) J Henin	3	6	5
2	(United States) L Davenport	6	2	7

Third round
(Italy) S Farina	2	0	r
(United States) J Capriati	6	4
(Colombia) F Zuluaga	6^{5}	3
2	(United States) L Davenport	7^{7}	6

Fourth round
(United States) J Capriati	2	3
2	(United States) L Davenport	6	6

Preceded by 1999 Australian Open – Women's singles	Grand Slam women's singles	Succeeded by 1999 Wimbledon Championships – Women's singles
