= 1999 French Open – Men's singles =

Men's singles
- 1999 French Open

Final
- Champion: (United States) Andre Agassi
- Runner-up: (Ukraine) Andrei Medvedev
- Score: 1–6, 2–6, 6–4, 6–3, 6–4

Details
- Draw: 128
- Seeds: 16

Events
Singles	men	women		boys	girls
Doubles	men	women	mixed	boys	girls
WC Singles	men	women	quad
WC Doubles	men	women	quad
Legends	−45	45+	women
- French Open

Andre Agassi defeated Andrei Medvedev in the final, 1–6, 2–6, 6–4, 6–3, 6–4 to win the men's singles tennis title at the 1999 French Open. It was his first and only French Open title (following two runner-up finishes in 1990 and 1991) and fourth major title overall. Agassi became the second man in the Open Era (after Rod Laver) to complete the career Grand Slam and the first to do so across three surfaces. He also completed the career Golden Slam and the career Super Slam. Agassi was the third man in the Open Era to win a major singles final from two sets down, after Björn Borg at the 1974 French Open and Ivan Lendl at the 1984 French Open.

Carlos Moyá was the defending champion, but lost in the fourth round to Agassi.

This tournament marked the first major appearances for future 20-time major champion and world No. 1 Roger Federer and future champion Gastón Gaudio; they lost to Patrick Rafter and Àlex Corretja in the first round and third round, respectively. This tournament also marked the final French Open appearance of former world No. 1 and two-time champion Jim Courier, who lost to Hicham Arazi in the second round. It was also the final major appearance for former world No. 1 and 1995 champion Thomas Muster, who was defeated by Nicolás Lapentti in the first round.

== Seeds ==
1. (Russia) Yevgeny Kafelnikov (second round)
2. (United States) Pete Sampras (second round)
3. (Australia) Patrick Rafter (third round)
4. (Spain) Carlos Moyá (fourth round)
5. (Netherlands) Richard Krajicek (second round)
6. (Spain) Àlex Corretja (quarterfinals)
7. (United Kingdom) Tim Henman (third round)
8. (Brazil) Gustavo Kuerten (quarterfinals)

9. (Chile) Marcelo Ríos (quarterfinals)
10. (Australia) Mark Philippoussis (first round)
11. (Slovakia) Karol Kučera (first round)
12. (United Kingdom) Greg Rusedski (fourth round)
13. (United States) Andre Agassi (champion)
14. (Spain) Félix Mantilla (fourth round)
15. (Croatia) Goran Ivanišević (first round)
16. (Sweden) Thomas Enqvist (second round)

Click on the seed number of a player to go to their draw section.

== Draw ==
Key

- Q = Qualifier
- WC = Wild card
- LL = Lucky loser
- Alt = Alternate
- ITF = ITF entry
- PR = Protected ranking
- SR = Special ranking
- SE = Special exempt
- JE = Junior exempt
- JR = Junior Accelerator Programme entrant
- CO = College Accelerator Programme entrant
- NG = Next Gen Accelerator Program entrant
- w/o = Walkover
- r = Retired
- d = Defaulted

=== Finals ===
Quarterfinals
(Slovakia) Dominik Hrbatý	7^{7}	6	6^{6}	6
9	(Chile) Marcelo Ríos	6^{4}	2	7^{8}	3
13	(United States) Andre Agassi	6	6	6
Q	(Uruguay) Marcelo Filippini	2	2	0
6	(Spain) Àlex Corretja	2	2	0
(Brazil) Fernando Meligeni	6	6	6
8	(Brazil) Gustavo Kuerten	5	4	4
(Ukraine) Andrei Medvedev	7	6	6

Semifinals
(Slovakia) Dominik Hrbatý	4	6^{6}	6	4
13	(United States) Andre Agassi	6	7^{8}	3	6
(Brazil) Fernando Meligeni	5	6	4	6^{6}
(Ukraine) Andrei Medvedev	7	3	6	7^{8}

Final
13	(United States) Andre Agassi	1	2	6	6	6
(Ukraine) Andrei Medvedev	6	6	4	3	4

=== Top half ===
==== Section 1 ====
First round
1	(Russia) Y Kafelnikov	6	5	6	7^{10}
(United States) M Chang	2	7	0	6^{8}
WC	(France) J Boutter	7	4	5	5
(Slovakia) D Hrbatý	5	6	7	7
(Australia) A Ilie	4	6	7	3	6
(Sweden) J Björkman	6	3	5	6	3
(Australia) L Hewitt	6	4	4	6	4
(Argentina) M Rodríguez	4	6	6	4	6
(Germany) J Knippschild	6	6	6
WC	(France) L Roux	4	3	0
(Slovakia) J Krošlák	2	6	3	6	2
(Russia) M Safin	6	4	6	3	6
Q	(Spain) Á Calatrava	1	3	5
(United States) J Courier	6	6	7
(Morocco) H Arazi	6	1	6	6
15	(Croatia) G Ivanišević	4	6	3	1

Second round
1	(Russia) Y Kafelnikov	4	1	4
(Slovakia) D Hrbatý	6	6	6
(Australia) A Ilie	7	4	2	6	6
(Argentina) M Rodríguez	5	6	6	3	4
(Germany) J Knippschild	3	3^{r}
(Russia) M Safin	6	4
(United States) J Courier	6	3	4	1
(Morocco) H Arazi	2	6	6	6

Third round
(Slovakia) D Hrbatý	3	7	6	4	6
(Australia) A Ilie	6	5	2	6	2
(Russia) M Safin	7^{7}	3	6	6
(Morocco) H Arazi	6^{5}	6	4	3

Fourth round
(Slovakia) D Hrbatý	6	3	7^{7}	6
(Russia) M Safin	4	6	6^{5}	3

==== Section 2 ====
First round
9	(Chile) M Ríos	6	6	7
Q	(Germany) A Pretzsch	3	2	5
WC	(France) A Boetsch	6	6	6
Q	(Romania) R Sabău	0	1	1
(Czech Republic) D Vacek	4	3	6	4
Q	(Argentina) A Calleri	6	6	4	6
(Sweden) M Gustafsson	3	6	5	6^{5}
(Spain) A Costa	6	4	7	7^{7}
(Spain) A Berasategui	6	6	4	6
(Zimbabwe) W Black	0	3	6	2
WC	(France) S Huet	2	7	6	6
(Germany) H Dreekmann	6	5	3	3
(Czech Republic) J Novák	6	6	6
(Canada) D Nestor	2	2	2
(Morocco) K Alami	4	6	6	3	4
7	(United Kingdom) T Henman	6	3	4	6	6

Second round
9	(Chile) M Ríos	6	6	7
WC	(France) A Boetsch	2	3	5
Q	(Argentina) A Calleri	3	4	3
(Spain) A Costa	6	6	6
(Spain) A Berasategui	4	6	6	6
WC	(France) S Huet	6	4	2	4
(Czech Republic) J Novák	7	1	5	2
7	(United Kingdom) T Henman	5	6	7	6

Third round
9	(Chile) M Ríos	7	6	7
(Spain) A Costa	5	4	5
(Spain) A Berasategui	4	4	6	7	6
7	(United Kingdom) T Henman	6	6	4	5	4

Fourth round
9	(Chile) M Ríos	3	3	6	6	6
(Spain) A Berasategui	6	6	3	4	3

==== Section 3 ====
First round
4	(Spain) C Moyá	3	1	6	6	6
(Austria) M Hipfl	6	6	4	2	4
(Spain) A Martín	6^{2}	1	6	3
(Czech Republic) P Korda	7^{7}	6	4	6
(South Africa) W Ferreira	3	6	6	6
LL	(Denmark) K Carlsen	6	3	3	2
WC	(France) J-R Lisnard	7^{7}	4	2	2
(Armenia) S Sargsian	6^{4}	6	6	6
(Ecuador) N Lapentti	2	6	6	7^{7}
(Austria) T Muster	6	1	2	6^{4}
PR	(United States) C Woodruff	6	6	6^{4}	7
Q	(Argentina) D Moyano	2	3	7^{7}	5
(France) A Clément	3	3	7^{10}	6	6
(France) C Pioline	6	6	6^{8}	4	3
(Argentina) F Squillari	6	5	5	3
13	(United States) A Agassi	3	7	7	6

Second round
4	(Spain) C Moyá	6^{5}	6	6	6
(Czech Republic) P Korda	7^{7}	4	3	1
(South Africa) W Ferreira	7^{7}	2	2	6^{5}
(Armenia) S Sargsian	6^{4}	6	6	7^{7}
(Ecuador) N Lapentti	6^{2}	6^{5}	5
PR	(United States) C Woodruff	7^{7}	7^{7}	7
(France) A Clément	2	6	6	5	0
13	(United States) A Agassi	6	4	2	7	6

Third round
4	(Spain) C Moyá	6	7^{7}	2	6
(Armenia) S Sargsian	3	6^{3}	6	3
PR	(United States) C Woodruff	4	4	3
13	(United States) A Agassi	6	6	6

Fourth round
4	(Spain) C Moyá	6	5	5	1
13	(United States) A Agassi	4	7	7	6

==== Section 4 ====
First round
12	(United Kingdom) G Rusedski	6	6	6^{4}	6
(Germany) D Prinosil	4	4	7^{7}	4
WC	(France) A Dupuis	3	6	1	3
(Australia) R Fromberg	6	3	6	6
(Italy) D Sanguinetti	6	6	3	6
(Netherlands) J van Lottum	4	2	6	3
(Romania) A Pavel	7^{7}	2	1^{r}
(Argentina) H Gumy	6^{3}	6	3
Q	(Uruguay) M Filippini	6	6	6
(Italy) L Tieleman	4	1	4
(Germany) N Kiefer	5	4	2
(Czech Republic) M Damm	7	6	6
(Australia) M Woodforde	6^{5}	3	5
(United States) V Spadea	7^{7}	6	7
(United States) J-M Gambill	6^{4}	3	2
5	(Netherlands) R Krajicek	7^{7}	6	6

Second round
12	(United Kingdom) G Rusedski	6	4	6	6
(Australia) R Fromberg	4	6	2	3
(Italy) D Sanguinetti	6^{5}	7	6	7^{7}
(Argentina) H Gumy	7^{7}	5	4	6^{4}
Q	(Uruguay) M Filippini	6	6	6
(Czech Republic) M Damm	4	4	4
(United States) V Spadea	6	6	6
5	(Netherlands) R Krajicek	1	2	4

Third round
12	(United Kingdom) G Rusedski	6	7^{9}	6
(Italy) D Sanguinetti	2	6^{7}	2
Q	(Uruguay) M Filippini	6	6	6
(United States) V Spadea	2	4	4

Fourth round
12	(United Kingdom) G Rusedski	6^{8}	3	4
Q	(Uruguay) M Filippini	7^{10}	6	6

=== Bottom half ===
==== Section 5 ====
First round
6	(Spain) À Corretja	7^{7}	6	6
Q	(Spain) G Puentes	6^{4}	4	2
(United States) J Tarango	7	2	3	3
(Spain) F Vicente	5	6	6	6
(Sweden) M Norman	6^{5}	6	2	4
(Germany) B Karbacher	7^{7}	4	6	6
(Germany) O Gross	1	0^{r}
Q	(Argentina) G Gaudio	6	2
(France) G Raoux	0	4	5
(Austria) S Koubek	6	6	7
Q	(Spain) Á López Morón	6	6	4	6
(Australia) T Woodbridge	0	3	6	2
(France) F Santoro	3	4	6	7	1
(France) S Grosjean	6	6	3	5	6
(Sweden) M Larsson	6	6	6
11	(Slovakia) K Kučera	2	3	2

Second round
6	(Spain) À Corretja	6	6	3	6^{4}	6
(Spain) F Vicente	3	4	6	7^{7}	2
(Germany) B Karbacher	7^{7}	6	3	1	4
Q	(Argentina) G Gaudio	6^{3}	4	6	6	6
(Austria) S Koubek	6	7^{7}	6^{5}	6
Q	(Spain) Á López Morón	2	6^{3}	7^{7}	4
(France) S Grosjean	6	2	7^{7}	6
(Sweden) M Larsson	4	6	6^{3}	4

Third round
6	(Spain) À Corretja	6	6	6
Q	(Argentina) G Gaudio	4	3	3
(Austria) S Koubek	6	6	6
(France) S Grosjean	3	4	4

Fourth round
6	(Spain) À Corretja	6	6	7
(Austria) S Koubek	2	3	5

==== Section 6 ====
First round
14	(Spain) F Mantilla	4	6	6	6
WC	(France) R Gilbert	6	4	3	4
(Argentina) M Puerta	6	7^{7}	6
(Italy) G Pozzi	2	6^{0}	4
(Switzerland) M Rosset	6^{6}	6^{4}	1
(Germany) T Haas	7^{8}	7^{7}	6
Q	(Italy) M Navarra	3	6	7^{8}	7^{7}
(Australia) S Draper	6	1	6^{6}	6^{5}
(Brazil) F Meligeni	6	6	6
(United States) J Gimelstob	3	3	3
LL	(Belgium) X Malisse	2	0	4
(Morocco) Y El Aynaoui	6	6	6
Q	(Czech Republic) P Luxa	4	3	1
(France) N Escudé	6	6	6
WC	(Switzerland) R Federer	7	3	0	2
3	(Australia) P Rafter	5	6	6	6

Second round
14	(Spain) F Mantilla	7	6	6
(Argentina) M Puerta	5	4	4
(Germany) T Haas	6	6	6
Q	(Italy) M Navarra	1	3	1
(Brazil) F Meligeni	6^{5}	6	4	6	6
(Morocco) Y El Aynaoui	7^{7}	3	6	3	3
(France) N Escudé	5	0	6	4
3	(Australia) P Rafter	7	6	2	6

Third round
14	(Spain) F Mantilla	7^{7}	6	6
(Germany) T Haas	6^{3}	1	4
(Brazil) F Meligeni	6	6	3	6
3	(Australia) P Rafter	4	2	6	3

Fourth round
14	(Spain) F Mantilla	1	7	5	6^{1}
(Brazil) F Meligeni	6	5	7	7^{7}

==== Section 7 ====
First round
8	(Brazil) G Kuerten	6	6	6
(Spain) G Blanco	4	4	3
(Argentina) G Cañas	7^{7}	4	6	6
(Netherlands) J Siemerink	6^{2}	6	2	4
(Netherlands) S Schalken	6	6	4	6
(Netherlands) P Haarhuis	2	3	6	3
(Spain) F Clavet	6	7^{7}	6
Q	(Spain) J Alonso	3	6^{5}	4
(Italy) A Gaudenzi	6	6	4	6
(Germany) R Schüttler	4	2	6	3
LL	(Belarus) V Voltchkov	2	4	2
Q	(Germany) M Hantschk	6	6	6
(Czech Republic) B Ulihrach	6	6	6
(Paraguay) R Delgado	1	3	3
(Australia) J Stoltenberg	7^{7}	6	6
10	(Australia) M Philippoussis	6^{4}	4	1

Second round
8	(Brazil) G Kuerten	6	6	3	6
(Argentina) G Cañas	2	3	6	2
(Netherlands) S Schalken	4	6	6^{3}	6	6
(Spain) F Clavet	6	3	7^{7}	3	4
(Italy) A Gaudenzi	1	6	6	6
Q	(Germany) M Hantschk	6	3	4	3
(Czech Republic) B Ulihrach	3	7^{7}	6	5	6
(Australia) J Stoltenberg	6	6^{5}	3	7	3

Third round
8	(Brazil) G Kuerten	6	6	6
(Netherlands) S Schalken	2	4	3
(Italy) A Gaudenzi	3	5	4
(Czech Republic) B Ulihrach	6	7	6

Fourth round
8	(Brazil) G Kuerten	6	6	6
(Czech Republic) B Ulihrach	4	4	2

==== Section 8 ====
First round
16	(Sweden) T Enqvist	4	6	6	6
Q	(Argentina) H Moretti	6	0	4	2
(Spain) C Costa	3	4	4
(Norway) C Ruud	6	6	6
(France) A di Pasquale	6	6	6^{3}	6
Q	(Belgium) C Rochus	2	2	7^{7}	4
Q	(Belarus) M Mirnyi	6	7^{7}	6
(Argentina) M Zabaleta	1	6^{4}	2
(Zimbabwe) B Black	4	3	6	6	6
(Romania) A Voinea	6	6	3	2	4
(Philippines) C Mamiit	2	2	4
(Spain) A Portas	6	6	6
(Romania) D Pescariu	3	1	1
(Ukraine) A Medvedev	6	6	6
(Costa Rica) JA Marín	7^{7}	4	5	7^{11}	4
2	(United States) P Sampras	6^{5}	6	7	6^{9}	6

Second round
16	(Sweden) T Enqvist	6^{5}	4	3
(Norway) C Ruud	7^{7}	6	6
(France) A di Pasquale	4	6^{3}	7	6	6
Q	(Belarus) M Mirnyi	6	7^{7}	5	3	3
(Zimbabwe) B Black	6	6	6
(Spain) A Portas	2	3	2
(Ukraine) A Medvedev	7	1	6	6
2	(United States) P Sampras	5	6	4	3

Third round
(Norway) C Ruud	6	1	2	3
(France) A di Pasquale	3	6	6	6
(Zimbabwe) B Black	1	2	6	1
(Ukraine) A Medvedev	6	6	3	6

Fourth round
(France) A di Pasquale	6^{5}	6^{3}	1
(Ukraine) A Medvedev	7^{7}	7^{7}	6

Preceded by 1999 Australian Open – Men's singles	Grand Slam men's singles	Succeeded by 1999 Wimbledon Championships – Men's singles
