= 1999 French Open – Mixed doubles =

Mixed doubles
- 1999 French Open

Final
- Champions: (South Africa) Piet Norval (Slovenia) Katarina Srebotnik
- Runners-up: (United States) Rick Leach (Latvia) Larisa Neiland
- Score: 6–3, 3–6, 6–3

Details
- Draw: 48
- Seeds: 16

Events
Singles	men	women		boys	girls
Doubles	men	women	mixed	boys	girls
WC Singles	men	women	quad
WC Doubles	men	women	quad
Legends	−45	45+	women
- French Open

The 1999 French Open mixed doubles event was part of the ninety-eighth edition of the French Open, the second Grand Slam tournament of the year. Justin Gimelstob and Venus Williams were the defending champions, but they did not compete this year.

The unseeded pair of Piet Norval and Katarina Srebotnik defeated the sixth-seeded team of Rick Leach and Larisa Neiland in the final, 6–3, 3–6, 6–3.

== Seeds ==
All seeds receive a bye into the second round.

1. (India) Leander Paes / (United States) Lisa Raymond (quarterfinals)
2. n.a.
3. (India) Mahesh Bhupathi / (Japan) Ai Sugiyama (quarterfinals)
4. (Australia) Mark Woodforde / (Russia) Elena Likhovtseva (semifinals)
5. (Czech Republic) Cyril Suk / (Netherlands) Caroline Vis (second round)
6. (United States) Rick Leach / (Latvia) Larisa Neiland (final)
7. (South Africa) David Adams / (South Africa) Mariaan de Swardt (quarterfinals)
8. (South Africa) Ellis Ferreira / (United States) Debbie Graham (second round)
9. (Australia) Peter Tramacchi / (Ukraine) Elena Tatarkova (second round)
10. (Spain) Tomás Carbonell / (Argentina) Patricia Tarabini (third round)
11. (South Africa) John-Laffnie de Jager / (Australia) Catherine Barclay (third round)
12. (Argentina) Pablo Albano / (Netherlands) Manon Bollegraf (second round)
13. (United States) Jim Grabb / (Romania) Cătălina Cristea (second round)
14. (Argentina) Daniel Orsanic / (Kazakhstan) Irina Selyutina (third round)
15. (France) Fabrice Santoro / (France) Alexia Dechaume-Balleret (second round)
16. (United States) Francisco Montana / (United States) Corina Morariu (third round)
17. (Australia) David Macpherson / (Australia) Rachel McQuillan (second round)

== Draw ==
Key

- Q = Qualifier
- WC = Wild card
- LL = Lucky loser
- Alt = Alternate
- ITF = ITF entry
- PR = Protected ranking
- SR = Special ranking
- SE = Special exempt
- JE = Junior exempt
- JR = Junior Accelerator Programme entrant
- CO = College Accelerator Programme entrant
- NG = Next Gen Accelerator Program entrant
- w/o = Walkover
- r = Retired
- d = Defaulted

=== Finals ===
Quarterfinals
1	(India) Leander Paes (United States) Lisa Raymond	6^{8}	3
6	(United States) Rick Leach (Latvia) Larisa Neiland	7^{10}	6
4	(Australia) Mark Woodforde (Russia) Elena Likhovtseva	7	6
7	(South Africa) David Adams (South Africa) Mariaan de Swardt	5	2
(South Africa) Grant Stafford (South Africa) Esmé de Villiers	7	6
(Czech Republic) Pavel Vízner (Australia) Kristine Kunce	5	3
(South Africa) Piet Norval (Slovenia) Katarina Srebotnik	2	6	7
3	(India) Mahesh Bhupathi (Japan) Ai Sugiyama	6	3	5

Semifinals
6	(United States) Rick Leach (Latvia) Larisa Neiland	6	3	6
4	(Australia) Mark Woodforde (Russia) Elena Likhovtseva	1	6	1
(South Africa) Grant Stafford (South Africa) Esmé de Villiers	3	3
(South Africa) Piet Norval (Slovenia) Katarina Srebotnik	6	6

Final
6	(United States) Rick Leach (Latvia) Larisa Neiland	3	6	3
(South Africa) Piet Norval (Slovenia) Katarina Srebotnik	6	3	6

=== Top half ===
==== Section 1 ====
First round
(Belgium) T Vanhoudt (Belgium) D Van Roost	6	5	6
(Argentina) D del Río (Argentina) L Montalvo	4	7	4
(Russia) A Olhovskiy (South Africa) L Horn	3	4
(Netherlands) P Haarhuis (Netherlands) K Boogert	6	6
(Italy) C Brandi (Italy) R Grande	6	4	3
(United States) J Waite (United States) K Po	2	6	6
(Sweden) P Nyborg (United States) E deLone	6	6
(United States) B Coupe (Japan) R Hiraki	4	2

Second round
1	(India) L Paes (United States) L Raymond	4	6	6
(Belgium) T Vanhoudt (Belgium) D Van Roost	6	2	3
(Netherlands) P Haarhuis (Netherlands) K Boogert	6^{5}	5
11	(South Africa) J-L de Jager (Australia) C Barclay	7^{7}	7
14	(Argentina) D Orsanic (Kazakhstan) I Selyutina	6	6
(United States) J Waite (United States) K Po	2	2
(Sweden) P Nyborg (United States) E deLone	4	3
6	(United States) R Leach (Latvia) L Neiland	6	6

Third round
1	(India) L Paes (United States) L Raymond	6	6
11	(South Africa) J-L de Jager (Australia) C Barclay	3	4
14	(Argentina) D Orsanic (Kazakhstan) I Selyutina	3	6	3
6	(United States) R Leach (Latvia) L Neiland	6	3	6

Quarterfinals
1	(India) L Paes (United States) L Raymond	6^{8}	3
6	(United States) R Leach (Latvia) L Neiland	7^{10}	6

==== Section 2 ====
First round
(United States) D Bowen (France) C Dhenin	1	5
(United States) B Bryan (United States) L Osterloh	6	7
(United States) M Bryan (United States) K Schlukebir	6	6
WC	(France) J Hanquez (France) N van Lottum	4	2
(Czech Republic) D Rikl (Belarus) O Barabanschikova	6	2	6
WC	(France) R Gilbert (France) É Loit	3	6	4
(Sweden) N Kulti (Netherlands) M Oremans	6	6
(North Macedonia) A Kitinov (Czech Republic) H Vildová	1	2

Second round
4	(Australia) M Woodforde (Russia) E Likhovtseva	6	6
(United States) B Bryan (United States) L Osterloh	3	3
(United States) M Bryan (United States) K Schlukebir	2	3
10	(Spain) T Carbonell (Argentina) P Tarabini	6	6
15	(France) F Santoro (France) A Dechaume-Balleret	7	3	3
(Czech Republic) D Rikl (Belarus) O Barabanschikova	5	6	6
(Sweden) N Kulti (Netherlands) M Oremans	1	4
7	(South Africa) D Adams (South Africa) M de Swardt	6	6

Third round
4	(Australia) M Woodforde (Russia) E Likhovtseva	7^{7}	6
10	(Spain) T Carbonell (Argentina) P Tarabini	6^{5}	2
(Czech Republic) D Rikl (Belarus) O Barabanschikova	6	1	2
7	(South Africa) D Adams (South Africa) M de Swardt	3	6	6

Quarterfinals
4	(Australia) M Woodforde (Russia) E Likhovtseva	7	6
7	(South Africa) D Adams (South Africa) M de Swardt	5	2

=== Bottom half ===
==== Section 3 ====
First round
(South Africa) B Haygarth (United States) K Adams	4	6	10
Alt	(United States) P Galbraith (Australia) A Molik	6	4	8
(South Africa) G Stafford (South Africa) E de Villiers	7^{7}	4	6
(United States) M Keil (Australia) L McShea	6^{4}	6	2
WC	(Morocco) H Arazi (Romania) R Sandu	6	4	3
WC	(France) G Raoux (France) S Testud	2	6	6
(Czech Republic) P Vízner (Australia) K Kunce	2	6	6
(Australia) A Florent (Australia) A Ellwood	6	3	3

Second round
8	(South Africa) E Ferreira (United States) D Graham	6	6^{5}	11
(South Africa) B Haygarth (United States) K Adams	2	7^{7}	9
(South Africa) G Stafford (South Africa) E de Villiers	7	6
13	(United States) J Grabb (Romania) C Cristea	5	4
17	(Australia) D Macpherson (Australia) R McQuillan	3	4
WC	(France) G Raoux (France) S Testud	6	6
(Czech Republic) P Vízner (Australia) K Kunce	4	6	7
5	(Czech Republic) C Suk (Netherlands) C Vis	6	4	5

Third round
8	(South Africa) E Ferreira (United States) D Graham	4	6	1
(South Africa) G Stafford (South Africa) E de Villiers	6	3	6
WC	(France) G Raoux (France) S Testud	3	4
(Czech Republic) P Vízner (Australia) K Kunce	6	6

Quarterfinals
(South Africa) G Stafford (South Africa) E de Villiers	7	6
(Czech Republic) P Vízner (Australia) K Kunce	5	2

==== Section 4 ====
First round
(United Kingdom) N Broad (Australia) L Pleming	4	4
(South Africa) L Bale (Zimbabwe) C Black	6	6
(South Africa) P Norval (Slovenia) K Srebotnik	4	6	6
(South Africa) R Koenig (Australia) N Pratt	6	3	4
(South Africa) C Haggard (South Africa) J Steck	4	5
(Mexico) D Roditi (Japan) N Miyagi	6	7
(Australia) A Kratzmann (Canada) S Jeyaseelan	2	6	6
WC	(France) A Clément (France) A-G Sidot	6	3	3

Second round
9	(Australia) P Tramacchi (Ukraine) E Tatarkova	6^{4}	4
(South Africa) L Bale (Zimbabwe) C Black	7^{7}	6
(South Africa) P Norval (Slovenia) K Srebotnik	6	6
12	(Argentina) P Albano (Netherlands) M Bollegraf	4	4
16	(United States) F Montana (United States) C Morariu	6	6
(Mexico) D Roditi (Japan) N Miyagi	1	1
(Australia) A Kratzmann (Canada) S Jeyaseelan	6	2	4
3	(India) M Bhupathi (Japan) A Sugiyama	2	6	6

Third round
(South Africa) L Bale (Zimbabwe) C Black	4	7^{7}	3
(South Africa) P Norval (Slovenia) K Srebotnik	6	6^{2}	6
16	(United States) F Montana (United States) C Morariu	6^{4}	2
3	(India) M Bhupathi (Japan) A Sugiyama	7^{7}	6

Quarterfinals
(South Africa) P Norval (Slovenia) K Srebotnik	2	6	7
3	(India) M Bhupathi (Japan) A Sugiyama	6	3	5
