= 1999 French Open – Men's doubles =

Men's doubles
- 1999 French Open

Final
- Champions: (India) Mahesh Bhupathi (India) Leander Paes
- Runners-up: (Croatia) Goran Ivanišević (United States) Jeff Tarango
- Score: 6–2, 7–5

Details
- Draw: 64
- Seeds: 16

Events
Singles	men	women		boys	girls
Doubles	men	women	mixed	boys	girls
WC Singles	men	women	quad
WC Doubles	men	women	quad
Legends	−45	45+	women
← 1998 ·	French Open	· 2000 →

Jacco Eltingh and Paul Haarhuis were the defending champions, but Eltingh did not compete this year. Haarhuis competed with American Jared Palmer as the seventh seed, but they were eliminated in the second round by Javier Sánchez and Jan Siemerink.

First seeds Mahesh Bhupathi and Leander Paes won in the final by defeating the unseeded team of Goran Ivanišević and Jeff Tarango, 6–2, 7–5.

This was the first major marked the beginning of Bryan brothers' 76-consecutive slam appearance streak, which ended with Bob Bryan's withdrawal at the 2018 French Open. Mike Bryan had his record run of 84 consecutive Grand Slam main draw appearances until the 2020 Australian Open, where he and Bob eventually retired from that sport.

== Seeds ==
1. (India) Mahesh Bhupathi / (India) Leander Paes (champion)
2. (The Bahamas) Mark Knowles / (Canada) Daniel Nestor (second round, withdrew)
3. (Australia) Todd Woodbridge / (Australia) Mark Woodforde (first round)
4. (Zimbabwe) Wayne Black / (Australia) Sandon Stolle (third round)
5. (Sweden) Jonas Björkman / (Australia) Patrick Rafter (third round)
6. (France) Olivier Delaître / (France) Fabrice Santoro (second round)
7. (Netherlands) Paul Haarhuis / (United States) Jared Palmer (second round)
8. (South Africa) Ellis Ferreira / (United States) Rick Leach (quarterfinals)
9. (South Africa) David Adams / (South Africa) John-Laffnie de Jager (first round)
10. (Czech Republic) Jiří Novák / (Czech Republic) David Rikl (third round)
11. (United States) Donald Johnson / (Czech Republic) Cyril Suk (first round)
12. (Canada) Sébastien Lareau / (United States) Alex O'Brien (first round)
13. (United States) Patrick Galbraith / (United States) Justin Gimelstob (first round)
14. (United States) Jim Grabb / (Australia) David Macpherson (first round)
15. (South Africa) Piet Norval / (Zimbabwe) Kevin Ullyett (third round)
16. (Russia) Yevgeny Kafelnikov / (Belarus) Max Mirnyi (quarterfinals)

== Draw ==
=== Key ===
- Q = Qualifier
- WC = Wild card
- LL = Lucky loser
- Alt = Alternate
- ITF = ITF entry
- PR = Protected ranking
- SR = Special ranking
- SE = Special exempt
- JE = Junior exempt
- JR = Junior Accelerator Programme entrant
- CO = College Accelerator Programme entrant
- NG = Next Gen Accelerator Program entrant
- w/o = Walkover
- r = Retired
- d = Defaulted

=== Finals ===
Quarterfinals
1	(India) Mahesh Bhupathi (India) Leander Paes	7	6
8	(South Africa) Ellis Ferreira (United States) Rick Leach	5	2
(Sweden) Nicklas Kulti (Sweden) Mikael Tillström	6	7^{7}
(Australia) Wayne Arthurs (Australia) Andrew Kratzmann	4	6^{4}
(Croatia) Goran Ivanišević (United States) Jeff Tarango	6	6
(Germany) David Prinosil (Czech Republic) Daniel Vacek	2	3
(Argentina) Pablo Albano (Spain) Tomás Carbonell	6	3	6
16	(Russia) Yevgeny Kafelnikov (Belarus) Max Mirnyi	3	6	2

Semifinals
1	(India) Mahesh Bhupathi (India) Leander Paes	6	6
(Sweden) Nicklas Kulti (Sweden) Mikael Tillström	4	3
(Croatia) Goran Ivanišević (United States) Jeff Tarango	7	6
(Argentina) Pablo Albano (Spain) Tomás Carbonell	5	4

Finals
1	(India) Mahesh Bhupathi (India) Leander Paes	6	7
(Croatia) Goran Ivanišević (United States) Jeff Tarango	2	5

=== Top half ===
==== Section 1 ====
First round
1	(India) M Bhupathi (India) L Paes	6	4	7
(Spain) J I Carrasco (Spain) J Velasco Jr.	2	6	5
WC	(Monaco) J-R Lisnard (France) M Llodra	4	6	7
(Spain) J Alonso (Spain) Á López Morón	6	4	5
(Germany) M Kohlmann (Belgium) T Vanhoudt	4	3
(South Africa) L Bale (South Africa) G Stafford	6	6
(Australia) J Greenhalgh (Australia) G Silcock	3	4
15	(South Africa) P Norval (Zimbabwe) K Ullyett	6	6
10	(Czech Republic) J Novák (Czech Republic) D Rikl	5	6	6
(Spain) E Nicolas (Spain) G Puentes	7	1	0
(South Africa) C Haggard (Slovakia) D Hrbatý	5	2
(United States) B Coupe (United States) P Goldstein	7	6
WC	(France) A Dupuis (France) O Mutis	2	6^{2}
(United States) D Bowen (Israel) E Ran	6	7^{7}
(United Kingdom) N Broad (South Africa) R Koenig	6^{5}	6^{4}
8	(South Africa) E Ferreira (United States) R Leach	7^{7}	7^{7}

Second round
1	(India) M Bhupathi (India) L Paes	6	6
WC	(Monaco) J-R Lisnard (France) M Llodra	2	4
(South Africa) L Bale (South Africa) G Stafford	3	4
15	(South Africa) P Norval (Zimbabwe) K Ullyett	6	6
10	(Czech Republic) J Novák (Czech Republic) D Rikl	6	7
(United States) B Coupe (United States) P Goldstein	3	5
(United States) D Bowen (Israel) E Ran	6^{3}	2
9	(South Africa) E Ferreira (United States) R Leach	7	6

Third round
1	(India) 'M Bhupathi (India) L Paes	7	3	6
15	(South Africa) P Norval (Zimbabwe) K Ullyett	5	6	4
10	(Czech Republic) J Novák (Czech Republic) D Rikl	5	3
9	(South Africa) E Ferreira (United States) R Leach	7	6

Quarterfinals
1	(India) M Bhupathi (India) L Paes	7	6
9	(South Africa) E Ferreira (United States) R Leach	5	2

==== Section 2 ====
First round
3	(Australia) T Woodbridge (Australia) M Woodforde	3	7	4
(Federal Republic of Yugoslavia) N Djordjević (Hungary) G Köves	6	5	6
(Argentina) D del Río (Argentina) M Rodríguez	4	6	6
(South Africa) N Godwin (South Africa) M Ondruska	6	2	2
(United States) F Montana (Philippines) E Taino	4	6	4
(Sweden) N Kulti (Sweden) M Tillström	6	2	6
(Brazil) G Kuerten (Ecuador) N Lapentti	7^{7}	6
14	(United States) J Grabb (Australia) D Macpherson	6^{4}	2
11	(United States) D Johnson (Czech Republic) C Suk	5	6	2
(Argentina) M Hood (Argentina) S Prieto	7	4	6
WC	(France) G Raoux (Czech Republic) P Vízner	3	6^{5}
WC	(France) N Escudé (France) G Forget	6	7^{7}
(Australia) W Arthurs (Australia) A Kratzmann	7^{7}	6
(Sweden) P Nyborg (Australia) P Tramacchi	6^{4}	3
WC	(France) A Clément (France) S de Chaunac	5	3
6	(France) O Delaître (France) F Santoro	7	6

Second round
(Federal Republic of Yugoslavia) N Djordjević (Hungary) G Köves	5	7	2
(Argentina) D del Río (Argentina) M Rodríguez	7	5	6
(Sweden) N Kulti (Sweden) M Tillström	6	6
(Brazil) G Kuerten (Ecuador) N Lapentti	3	2
(Argentina) M Hood (Argentina) S Prieto	4	6	8
WC	(France) N Escudé (France) G Forget	6	1	6
(Australia) W Arthurs (Australia) A Kratzmann	5	6	6
6	(France) O Delaître (France) F Santoro	7	3	4

Third round
(Argentina) D del Río (Argentina) M Rodríguez	1	3
(Sweden) N Kulti (Sweden) M Tillström	6	6
(Argentina) M Hood (Argentina) S Prieto	2	7^{8}	5
(Australia) W Arthurs (Australia) A Kratzmann	6	6^{6}	7

Quarterfinals
(Sweden) N Kulti (Sweden) M Tillström	6	7^{7}
(Australia) W Arthurs (Australia) A Kratzmann	4	6^{4}

=== Bottom half ===
==== Section 3 ====
First round
5	(Sweden) J Björkman (Australia) P Rafter	6	6
WC	(France) A di Pasquale (France) S Grosjean	3	1
(Italy) M Bertolini (Italy) C Brandi	7	4	4
(United States) B Bryan (United States) M Bryan	5	6	6
(United States) D DiLucia (United States) M Keil	4	3
(Zimbabwe) B Black (South Africa) W Ferreira	6	6
(Croatia) G Ivanišević (United States) J Tarango	7^{7}	6
12	(Canada) S Lareau (United States) A O'Brien	6^{1}	4
13	(United States) P Galbraith (United States) J Gimelstob	1	6	2
(Brazil) F Meligeni (Brazil) J Oncins	6	4	6
(Germany) D Prinosil (Czech Republic) D Vacek	4	7	6
(Mexico) D Roditi (Australia) M Tebbutt	6	5	2
WC	(France) A Boetsch (France) R Gilbert	5	7	2
(The Bahamas) M Merklein (United States) M Sell	7	5	6
(Spain) A Martín (South Africa) P Rosner	3	1
4	(Zimbabwe) W Black (Australia) S Stolle	6	6

Second round
5	(Sweden) J Björkman (Australia) P Rafter	6	6
(United States) B Bryan (United States) M Bryan	4	2
(Zimbabwe) B Black (South Africa) W Ferreira	2	3
(Croatia) G Ivanišević (United States) J Tarango	6	6
(Brazil) F Meligeni (Brazil) J Oncins	0	6	1
(Germany) D Prinosil (Czech Republic) D Vacek	6	4	6
(The Bahamas) M Merklein (United States) M Sell	3	6^{2}
4	(Zimbabwe) W Black (Australia) S Stolle	6	7^{7}

Third round
5	(Sweden) J Björkman (Australia) P Rafter	4	4
(Croatia) G Ivanišević (United States) J Tarango	6	6
(Germany) D Prinosil (Czech Republic) D Vacek	3	7	13
4	(Zimbabwe) W Black (Australia) S Stolle	6	5	11

Quarterfinals
(Croatia) G Ivanišević (United States) J Tarango	6	6
(Germany) D Prinosil (Czech Republic) D Vacek	2	3

==== Section 4 ====
First round
7	(Netherlands) P Haarhuis (United States) J Palmer	6	6
(Argentina) L Arnold Ker (North Macedonia) A Kitinov	1	2
(Spain) A Berasategui (Spain) F Roig	6	6^{3}	5
(Spain) J Sánchez (Netherlands) J Siemerink	0	7^{7}	7
(United States) G Grant (United States) TJ Middleton	2	1
(Argentina) P Albano (Spain) T Carbonell	6	6
(Australia) A Florent (Russia) A Olhovskiy	7	7
9	(South Africa) D Adams (South Africa) J-L de Jager	5	5
16	(Russia) Y Kafelnikov (Belarus) M Mirnyi	7	6
(United States) S Humphries (United States) J Waite	5	3
(Czech Republic) M Damm (Czech Republic) R Štěpánek	6	3	3
(Argentina) D Orsanic (Argentina) M Puerta	4	6	6
(South Africa) M Barnard (South Africa) B Haygarth	2	1
(United States) R Reneberg (United States) J Stark	6	6
(United States) D Flach (United States) B MacPhie	3	6	5
2	(The Bahamas) M Knowles (Canada) D Nestor	6	3	7

Second round
7	(Netherlands) P Haarhuis (United States) J Palmer	4	6	4
(Spain) J Sánchez (Netherlands) J Siemerink	6	2	6
(Argentina) P Albano (Spain) T Carbonell	6	6
(Australia) A Florent (Russia) A Olhovskiy	4	4
16	(Russia) Y Kafelnikov (Belarus) M Mirnyi	6	6^{5}	9
(Argentina) D Orsanic (Argentina) M Puerta	3	7^{7}	7
(United States) R Reneberg (United States) J Stark	w/o
2	(The Bahamas) M Knowles (Canada) D Nestor

Third round
(Spain) J Sánchez (Netherlands) J Siemerink	6	6^{4}	11
(Argentina) P Albano (Spain) T Carbonell	2	7^{7}	9
16	(Russia) Y Kafelnikov (Belarus) M Mirnyi	7^{8}	6
(United States) R Reneberg (United States) J Stark	6^{6}	4

Quarterfinals
(Argentina) P Albano (Spain) T Carbonell	6	3	6
16	(Russia) Y Kafelnikov (Belarus) M Mirnyi	3	6	2
