= 2000 Australian Open – Men's singles qualifying =

Men's singles qualifying
- 2000 Australian Open

Events
Singles	men	women		boys	girls
Doubles	men	women	mixed	boys	girls
WC Singles	men	women	quad
WC Doubles	men	women	quad
Legends	men	women	mixed

Qualification
Singles	men	women
- Australian Open

This article displays the qualifying draw for the Men's Singles at the 2000 Australian Open.

== Seeds ==
1. (Germany) Markus Hantschk (second round)
2. (Italy) Davide Sanguinetti (qualified)
3. (Belgium) Christophe Rochus (qualified)
4. (Czech Republic) Michal Tabara (qualifying competition, lucky loser)
5. (Sweden) Fredrik Jonsson (qualified)
6. (France) Jean-René Lisnard (second round)
7. (France) Stéphane Huet (second round)
8. (Germany) Lars Burgsmüller (second round)
9. (India) Leander Paes (qualified)
10. (Switzerland) Michel Kratochvil (first round)
11. (France) Thierry Guardiola (first round)
12. (Finland) Tuomas Ketola (first round)
13. (United Kingdom) Jamie Delgado (qualifying competition, lucky loser)
14. (Belgium) Xavier Malisse (qualifying competition)
15. (Brazil) Francisco Costa (first round)
16. (Hungary) Attila Sávolt (first round)
17. (Zimbabwe) Wayne Black (qualified)
18. (Russia) Andrei Stoliarov (qualifying competition)
19. (Czech Republic) Jiří Vaněk (qualified)
20. (France) Julien Boutter (qualified)
21. (Germany) Michael Kohlmann (first round)
22. (United States) Alex O'Brien (qualified)
23. (South Africa) Marcos Ondruska (qualifying competition)
24. (Czech Republic) Radek Štěpánek (second round)
25. (Netherlands) Raemon Sluiter (qualified)
26. (Czech Republic) Petr Luxa (qualifying competition)
27. (United States) Michael Sell (first round)
28. (Argentina) Sebastián Prieto (second round)
29. (France) Cyril Saulnier (qualified)
30. (Romania) Dinu Pescariu (first round)
31. (Italy) Vincenzo Santopadre (qualifying competition)
32. (United States) Bob Bryan (qualifying competition)

== Qualifiers ==
1. (Zimbabwe) Kevin Ullyett
2. (Italy) Davide Sanguinetti
3. (Belgium) Christophe Rochus
4. (France) Cyril Saulnier
5. (Sweden) Fredrik Jonsson
6. (Israel) Noam Okun
7. (Netherlands) Raemon Sluiter
8. (United Kingdom) Arvind Parmar
9. (India) Leander Paes
10. (South Africa) Grant Stafford
11. (France) Rodolphe Cadart
12. (United States) Alex O'Brien
13. (France) Julien Boutter
14. (Czech Republic) Jiří Vaněk
15. (France) Michaël Llodra
16. (Zimbabwe) Wayne Black

== Lucky losers ==
1. (Czech Republic) Michal Tabara
2. (United Kingdom) Jamie Delgado

== Qualifying draw ==
Key

- Q = Qualifier
- WC = Wild card
- LL = Lucky loser
- Alt = Alternate
- ITF = ITF entry
- PR = Protected ranking
- SR = Special ranking
- SE = Special exempt
- JE = Junior exempt
- JR = Junior Accelerator Programme entrant
- CO = College Accelerator Programme entrant
- NG = Next Gen Accelerator Program entrant
- w/o = Walkover
- r = Retired
- d = Defaulted

=== First qualifier ===
First round
1	(Germany) Markus Hantschk	6	4	6
(South Africa) Donavan September	3	6	3
(Zimbabwe) Kevin Ullyett	6	6
(United States) Eric Taino	0	1
(Russia) Andrei Cherkasov	6	6
(Australia) Steven Randjelovic	3	2
(Italy) Federico Luzzi	4	4
32	(United States) Bob Bryan	6	6

Second round
1	(Germany) Markus Hantschk	3	4
(Zimbabwe) Kevin Ullyett	6	6
(Russia) Andrei Cherkasov	3	6	6
32	(United States) Bob Bryan	6	3	8

Qualifying competition
(Zimbabwe) Kevin Ullyett	6	6^{4}	18
32	(United States) Bob Bryan	3	7^{7}	16

=== Second qualifier ===
First round
2	(Italy) Davide Sanguinetti	6^{5}	6	6
WC	(Australia) Josh Tuckfield	7^{7}	4	3
(Austria) Martin Spöttl	7^{7}	4	4
(United States) Taylor Dent	6^{4}	6	6
(Israel) Noam Behr	7^{7}	6
(United States) Kevin Kim	6^{4}	4
(Japan) Takao Suzuki	3^{r}
31	(Italy) Vincenzo Santopadre	6

Second round
2	(Italy) Davide Sanguinetti	6	6
(United States) Taylor Dent	4	2
(Israel) Noam Behr	2	5
31	(Italy) Vincenzo Santopadre	6	7

Qualifying competition
2	(Italy) Davide Sanguinetti	6	6
31	(Italy) Vincenzo Santopadre	3	4

=== Third qualifier ===
First round
3	(Belgium) Christophe Rochus	7	6
(Australia) Jordan Kerr	5	4
(New Zealand) Mark Nielsen	4	3
(Czech Republic) Petr Dezort	6	6
(Australia) Leigh Holland	1	3
(United States) James Blake	6	6
(Japan) Yaoki Ishii	6	6
30	(Romania) Dinu Pescariu	2	4

Second round
3	(Belgium) Christophe Rochus	6	6
(Czech Republic) Petr Dezort	4	4
(United States) James Blake	4	7	8
(Japan) Yaoki Ishii	6	5	10

Qualifying competition
3	(Belgium) Christophe Rochus	6	7^{7}
(Japan) Yaoki Ishii	3	6^{4}

=== Fourth qualifier ===
First round
4	(Czech Republic) Michal Tabara	7^{7}	7^{11}
(Germany) Karsten Braasch	6^{4}	6^{9}
(South Africa) Jeff Coetzee	6	6
(France) Guillaume Marx	1	3
(Italy) Cristiano Caratti	6	6
(Australia) Matthew Breen	4	3
(Austria) Werner Eschauer	4	3
29	(France) Cyril Saulnier	6	6

Second round
4	(Czech Republic) Michal Tabara	7	6
(South Africa) Jeff Coetzee	5	2
(Italy) Cristiano Caratti	3	5
29	(France) Cyril Saulnier	6	7

Qualifying competition
4	(Czech Republic) Michal Tabara	3	2
29	(France) Cyril Saulnier	6	6

=== Fifth qualifier ===
First round
5	(Sweden) Fredrik Jonsson	3	6	6
WC	(Australia) Todd Perry	6	2	2
(Spain) Tommy Robredo	6	3	8
(Australia) Jaymon Crabb	4	6	6
(France) Lionel Roux	3	7	6
(Australia) Michael Tebbutt	6	5	1
(South Korea) Lee Hyung-taik	4	2
28	(Argentina) Sebastián Prieto	6	6

Second round
5	(Sweden) Fredrik Jonsson	6	7
(Spain) Tommy Robredo	3	5
(France) Lionel Roux	6	6
28	(Argentina) Sebastián Prieto	3	4

Qualifying competition
5	(Sweden) Fredrik Jonsson	6^{3}	6	6
(France) Lionel Roux	7^{7}	4	4

=== Sixth qualifier ===
First round
6	(France) Jean-René Lisnard	6	5	6
(France) Olivier Patience	3	7	3
(Israel) Noam Okun	6	6
(Israel) Eyal Ran	3	3
(Brazil) Alexandre Simoni	7^{7}	4	4
(United States) Mike Bryan	6^{0}	6	6
(Czech Republic) Leoš Friedl	6	6
27	(United States) Michael Sell	3	4

Second round
6	(France) Jean-René Lisnard	3	6	2
(Israel) Noam Okun	6	3	6
(United States) Mike Bryan	7	2	3
(Czech Republic) Leoš Friedl	5	6	6

Qualifying competition
(Israel) Noam Okun	7	6
(Czech Republic) Leoš Friedl	5	2

=== Seventh qualifier ===
First round
7	(France) Stéphane Huet	6	6
(Greece) Anastasios Vasiliadis	4	2
(Norway) Jan Frode Andersen	6	5	17
(Socialist Federal Republic of Yugoslavia) Dušan Vemić	4	7	19
(Austria) Wolfgang Schranz	7^{7}	6
(Italy) Giorgio Galimberti	6^{3}	4
(Finland) Kim Tiilikainen	1	2
25	(Netherlands) Raemon Sluiter	6	6

Second round
7	(France) Stéphane Huet	6^{5}	4
(Socialist Federal Republic of Yugoslavia) Dušan Vemić	7^{7}	6
(Austria) Wolfgang Schranz	6	3	2
25	(Netherlands) Raemon Sluiter	3	6	6

Qualifying competition
(Socialist Federal Republic of Yugoslavia) Dušan Vemić	4	6	2
25	(Netherlands) Raemon Sluiter	6	4	6

=== Eighth qualifier ===
First round
8	(Germany) Lars Burgsmüller	2	6	9
(Belarus) Alexander Shvets	6	3	7
WC	(Australia) Sebastien Swierk	1	7	3
(United Kingdom) Arvind Parmar	6	5	6
(Australia) Lee Pearson	3	4
(Australia) Paul Hanley	6	6
(Germany) Christian Vinck	5	1
26	(Czech Republic) Petr Luxa	7	6

Second round
8	(Germany) Lars Burgsmüller	2	1
(United Kingdom) Arvind Parmar	6	6
(Australia) Paul Hanley	4	1
26	(Czech Republic) Petr Luxa	6	6

Qualifying competition
(United Kingdom) Arvind Parmar	6	7
26	(Czech Republic) Petr Luxa	3	5

=== Ninth qualifier ===
First round
9	(India) Leander Paes	6	7^{7}
(Finland) Ville Liukko	3	6^{3}
(Czech Republic) František Čermák	7^{7}	6
(Germany) Björn Phau	6^{5}	4
(France) Sébastien De Chaunac	7	6
(Japan) Takahiro Terachi	5	3
(Japan) Satoshi Iwabuchi	1	2
23	(South Africa) Marcos Ondruska	6	6

Second round
9	(India) Leander Paes	6	6
(Czech Republic) František Čermák	2	2
(France) Sébastien De Chaunac	6^{7}	7^{7}	0
23	(South Africa) Marcos Ondruska	7^{9}	6^{5}	6

Qualifying competition
9	(India) Leander Paes	7^{7}	7^{7}
23	(South Africa) Marcos Ondruska	6^{4}	6^{5}

=== Tenth qualifier ===
First round
10	(Switzerland) Michel Kratochvil	4	6	1
(Mexico) Alejandro Hernández	6	3	6
(United States) Glenn Weiner	3	3
(Australia) Grant Doyle	6	6
(South Africa) Grant Stafford	7^{7}	6
(Sweden) Johan Settergren	6^{5}	4
(United States) Brian MacPhie	1	4
24	(Czech Republic) Radek Štěpánek	6	6

Second round
(Mexico) Alejandro Hernández	6^{5}	3
(Australia) Grant Doyle	7^{7}	6
(South Africa) Grant Stafford	6	6
24	(Czech Republic) Radek Štěpánek	1	3

Qualifying competition
(Australia) Grant Doyle	6	1	0
(South Africa) Grant Stafford	3	6	6

=== Eleventh qualifier ===
First round
11	(France) Thierry Guardiola	6	3	4
(France) Rodolphe Cadart	4	6	6
(Australia) Paul Kilderry	6	6
(United States) Mashiska Washington	4	4
(France) Jérôme Hanquez	6	6
(Germany) Andy Fahlke	4	4
(Canada) Frédéric Niemeyer	7^{7}	6
21	(Germany) Michael Kohlmann	6^{5}	4

Second round
(France) Rodolphe Cadart	7	6
(Australia) Paul Kilderry	5	3
(France) Jérôme Hanquez	7^{7}	6
(Canada) Frédéric Niemeyer	6^{4}	4

Qualifying competition
(France) Rodolphe Cadart	6	6
(France) Jérôme Hanquez	3	4

=== Twelfth qualifier ===
First round
12	(Finland) Tuomas Ketola	4	1
(Greece) Vasilis Mazarakis	6	6
(Austria) Julian Knowle	6	4	6
(Italy) Stefano Pescosolido	4	6	4
(United States) Geoff Grant	3	1
(Thailand) Danai Udomchoke	6	6
(Argentina) Mariano Hood	4	3
22	(United States) Alex O'Brien	6	6

Second round
(Greece) Vasilis Mazarakis	2	4
(Austria) Julian Knowle	6	6
(Thailand) Danai Udomchoke	2	4
22	(United States) Alex O'Brien	6	6

Qualifying competition
(Austria) Julian Knowle	2	4
22	(United States) Alex O'Brien	6	6

=== Thirteenth qualifier ===
First round
13	(United Kingdom) Jamie Delgado	6	6
(Portugal) Nuno Marques	4	4
(Netherlands) Edwin Kempes	6	7^{7}
WC	(Australia) Paul Baccanello	4	6^{5}
(Japan) Hideki Kaneko	6^{2}	4
PR	(Australia) Luke Smith	7^{7}	6
WC	(Australia) Domenic Marafiote	3	3
20	(France) Julien Boutter	6	6

Second round
13	(United Kingdom) Jamie Delgado	4	6	6
(Netherlands) Edwin Kempes	6	3	1
PR	(Australia) Luke Smith	7	4	2
20	(France) Julien Boutter	5	6	6

Qualifying competition
13	(United Kingdom) Jamie Delgado	4	4
20	(France) Julien Boutter	6	6

=== Fourteenth qualifier ===
First round
14	(Belgium) Xavier Malisse	6	6
WC	(Australia) Toby Mitchell	2	4
WC	(Australia) Ashley Fisher	4	2
(United Kingdom) Barry Cowan	6	6
(Hungary) Gergely Kisgyörgy	2	7^{8}	6
(Romania) Răzvan Sabău	6	6^{6}	3
(United States) Marq Foster	3	4
19	(Czech Republic) Jiří Vaněk	6	6

Second round
14	(Belgium) Xavier Malisse	7^{7}	1	6
(United Kingdom) Barry Cowan	6^{5}	6	4
(Hungary) Gergely Kisgyörgy	5	6	3
19	(Czech Republic) Jiří Vaněk	7	4	6

Qualifying competition
14	(Belgium) Xavier Malisse	2	1
19	(Czech Republic) Jiří Vaněk	6	6

=== Fifteenth qualifier ===
First round
15	(Brazil) Francisco Costa	7^{7}	6^{8}	4
WC	(Australia) Glenn Knox	6^{4}	7^{10}	6
(France) Michaël Llodra	6	6
WC	(Australia) Jay Gooding	3	1
(Spain) Rubén Ramírez Hidalgo	2	3
(The Bahamas) Mark Knowles	6	6
(Switzerland) Ivo Heuberger	6	4	4
18	(Russia) Andrei Stoliarov	3	6	6

Second round
WC	(Australia) Glenn Knox	1	0
(France) Michaël Llodra	6	6
(The Bahamas) Mark Knowles	4	7^{7}	1^{r}
18	(Russia) Andrei Stoliarov	6	6^{5}	2

Qualifying competition
(France) Michaël Llodra	7^{7}	6
18	(Russia) Andrei Stoliarov	6^{4}	4

=== Sixteenth qualifier ===
First round
16	(Hungary) Attila Sávolt	4	1
(France) Olivier Malcor	6	6
(United States) Jared Palmer	4	3^{r}
(Greece) Konstantinos Economidis	6	4
(Socialist Federal Republic of Yugoslavia) Nenad Zimonjić	6	6
(Australia) Mark Draper	4	1
(South Africa) Louis Vosloo	1	0
17	(Zimbabwe) Wayne Black	6	6

Second round
(France) Olivier Malcor	6	6
(Greece) Konstantinos Economidis	3	3
(Socialist Federal Republic of Yugoslavia) Nenad Zimonjić	6	6^{2}	2
17	(Zimbabwe) Wayne Black	2	7^{7}	6

Qualifying competition
(France) Olivier Malcor	6^{5}	6	2
17	(Zimbabwe) Wayne Black	7^{7}	3	6
