= 2000 Australian Open – Women's singles qualifying =

Women's singles qualifying
- 2000 Australian Open

Events
Singles	men	women		boys	girls
Doubles	men	women	mixed	boys	girls
WC Singles	men	women	quad
WC Doubles	men	women	quad
Legends	men	women	mixed

Qualification
Singles	men	women
- Australian Open

This article displays the qualifying draw for the Women's singles at the 2000 Australian Open.

== Seeds ==
1. (Italy) Tathiana Garbin (qualified)
2. (Ukraine) Elena Tatarkova (first round)
3. (Argentina) Florencia Labat (qualified)
4. (Japan) Shinobu Asagoe (qualifying competition)
5. (Russia) Alina Jidkova (qualified)
6. (United States) Holly Parkinson (qualifying competition)
7. (United States) Samantha Reeves (qualifying competition)
8. (Italy) Adriana Serra Zanetti (first round)
9. (Romania) Cătălina Cristea (qualifying competition)
10. (United States) Kimberly Po (second round)
11. (Canada) Vanessa Webb (qualifying competition)
12. (United States) Mashona Washington (second round)
13. (United States) Marissa Irvin (qualified)
14. (Italy) Francesca Lubiani (second round)
15. (Slovakia) Martina Suchá (first round)
16. (Australia) Kerry-Anne Guse (qualified)
17. (Japan) Nana Miyagi (first round)
18. (Belarus) Tatiana Poutchek (second round)
19. (Hungary) Katalin Marosi (second round)
20. (United States) Jennifer Hopkins (first round)
21. (Germany) Jana Kandarr (qualified)
22. (United Kingdom) Louise Latimer (qualifying competition)
23. (United States) Nicole Arendt (qualifying competition)
24. (Canada) Sonya Jeyaseelan (qualified)

== Qualifiers ==
1. (Italy) Tathiana Garbin
2. (France) Alexandra Fusai
3. (Argentina) Florencia Labat
4. (Canada) Sonya Jeyaseelan
5. (Russia) Alina Jidkova
6. (Germany) Jana Kandarr
7. (United Kingdom) Julie Pullin
8. (United States) Linda Wild
9. (United States) Marissa Irvin
10. (Australia) Kerry-Anne Guse
11. (Israel) Tzipora Obziler
12. (Russia) Lina Krasnoroutskaya

== Draw ==
=== First qualifier ===
First round
1	(Italy) Tathiana Garbin	6	6
(Italy) Giulia Casoni	3	3
WC	(Australia) Rennae Stubbs	6	7^{7}
(Italy) Antonella Serra Zanetti	4	6^{4}
(Austria) Evelyn Fauth	7	2	6
(Japan) Haruka Inoue	5	6	4
(Spain) Nuria Llagostera	7	6
20	(United States) Jennifer Hopkins	5	2

Second round
1	(Italy) Tathiana Garbin	5	7^{7}	8
WC	(Australia) Rennae Stubbs	7	6^{5}	6
(Austria) Evelyn Fauth	3	2
(Spain) Nuria Llagostera	6	6

Qualifying competition
1	(Italy) Tathiana Garbin	6	3	6
(Spain) Nuria Llagostera	3	6	2

=== Second qualifier ===
First round
2	(Ukraine) Elena Tatarkova	3	3
(Germany) Angelika Bachmann	6	6
(Germany) Sandra Klösel	6	6
(Austria) Marion Maruska	2	4
(France) Alexandra Fusai	6^{5}	6	6
(Chinese Taipei) Wang Shi-ting	7^{7}	3	3
(Italy) Laura Dell'Angelo	6	6
17	(Japan) Nana Miyagi	4	2

Second round
(Germany) Angelika Bachmann	2	6	2
(Germany) Sandra Klösel	6	3	6
(France) Alexandra Fusai	6	6
(Italy) Laura Dell'Angelo	1	3

Qualifying competition
(Germany) Sandra Klösel	5	6	4
(France) Alexandra Fusai	7	3	6

=== Third qualifier ===
First round
3	(Argentina) Florencia Labat	6	6
(South Africa) Surina De Beer	4	1
(Slovakia) Daniela Hantuchová	6	6
(Hungary) Zsófia Gubacsi	4	1
(France) Laurence Andretto	2	1
(Germany) Adriana Barna	6	6
WC	(Australia) Samantha Stosur	6	1	3
22	(United Kingdom) Louise Latimer	2	6	6

Second round
3	(Argentina) Florencia Labat	7	6
(Slovakia) Daniela Hantuchová	5	3
(Germany) Adriana Barna	6^{3}	6	3
22	(United Kingdom) Louise Latimer	7^{7}	1	6

Qualifying competition
3	(Argentina) Florencia Labat	7	6
22	(United Kingdom) Louise Latimer	5	1

=== Fourth qualifier ===
First round
4	(Japan) Shinobu Asagoe	6	7
(Spain) Marta Marrero	2	5
(Indonesia) Wynne Prakusya	2	6	6
(Slovenia) Tina Križan	6	3	3
(Kazakhstan) Irina Selyutina	6	6^{4}	7
(United States) Jill Craybas	3	7^{7}	5
(Spain) Conchita Martínez Granados	3	1
24	(Canada) Sonya Jeyaseelan	6	6

Second round
4	(Japan) Shinobu Asagoe	6	6
(Indonesia) Wynne Prakusya	3	4
(Kazakhstan) Irina Selyutina	2	2
24	(Canada) Sonya Jeyaseelan	6	6

Qualifying competition
4	(Japan) Shinobu Asagoe	6	2	3
24	(Canada) Sonya Jeyaseelan	2	6	6

=== Fifth qualifier ===
First round
5	(Russia) Alina Jidkova	1	7^{7}	6
(Czech Republic) Eva Martincová	6	6^{5}	4
(Denmark) Eva Dyrberg	6	6
(Spain) Rosa María Andrés	3	3
(Australia) Trudi Musgrave	1	7^{7}	1
(Czech Republic) Renata Kučerová	6	6^{0}	6
(Italy) Alice Canepa	3	5
23	(United States) Nicole Arendt	6	7

Second round
5	(Russia) Alina Jidkova	6	6
(Denmark) Eva Dyrberg	3	4
(Czech Republic) Renata Kučerová	1	3
23	(United States) Nicole Arendt	6	6

Qualifying competition
5	(Russia) Alina Jidkova	6	6
23	(United States) Nicole Arendt	3	0

=== Sixth qualifier ===
First round
6	(United States) Holly Parkinson	6	6
WC	(Australia) Cindy Watson	2	2
(Italy) Maria Paola Zavagli	6	7^{8}
(South Korea) Cho Yoon-jeong	4	6^{6}
(France) Lea Ghirardi	2	3
(Japan) Yuka Yoshida	6	6
(Poland) Anna Żarska	2	6	5
21	(Germany) Jana Kandarr	6	4	7

Second round
6	(United States) Holly Parkinson	7^{7}	6
(Italy) Maria Paola Zavagli	6^{4}	2
(Japan) Yuka Yoshida	6	2	7
21	(Germany) Jana Kandarr	2	6	9

Qualifying competition
6	(United States) Holly Parkinson	6	5	5
21	(Germany) Jana Kandarr	1	7	7

=== Seventh qualifier ===
First round
7	(United States) Samantha Reeves	6	6^{1}	6
WC	(Australia) Catherine Barclay	4	7^{7}	4
(Israel) Hila Rosen	6	6
(Romania) Raluca Sandu	1	4
(Uzbekistan) Iroda Tulyaganova	1	6	4
(Italy) Gloria Pizzichini	6	2	6
(United Kingdom) Julie Pullin	6	7
15	(Slovakia) Martina Suchá	4	5

Second round
7	(United States) Samantha Reeves	6	6
(Israel) Hila Rosen	0	3
(Italy) Gloria Pizzichini	4	0
(United Kingdom) Julie Pullin	6	6

Qualifying competition
7	(United States) Samantha Reeves	2	6^{3}
(United Kingdom) Julie Pullin	6	7^{7}

=== Eighth qualifier ===
First round
8	(Italy) Adriana Serra Zanetti	5	6	7
(United States) Linda Wild	7	3	9
(Czech Republic) Alena Vašková	6	2	4
(Spain) Ainhoa Goñi	2	6	6
(Slovenia) Petra Rampre	6^{4}	4
WC	(Australia) Christina Wheeler	7^{7}	6
(South Korea) Park Sung-hee	6	1	1
18	(Belarus) Tatiana Poutchek	4	6	6

Second round
(United States) Linda Wild	6	6
(Spain) Ainhoa Goñi	2	1
WC	(Australia) Christina Wheeler	6	7^{8}
18	(Belarus) Tatiana Poutchek	4	6^{6}

Qualifying competition
(United States) Linda Wild	6	6
WC	(Australia) Christina Wheeler	4	4

=== Ninth qualifier ===
First round
9	(Romania) Cătălina Cristea	6	4	6
(Belarus) Nadejda Ostrovskaya	2	6	2
(Czech Republic) Eva Krejčová	6	6
(Slovenia) Barbara Mulej	3	3
WC	(Australia) Melanie Clayton	5	2
(Spain) Paula Hermida	7	6
WC	(Australia) Monique Adamczak	3	3
13	(United States) Marissa Irvin	6	6

Second round
9	(Romania) Cătălina Cristea	6	0	8
(Czech Republic) Eva Krejčová	3	6	6
(Spain) Paula Hermida	5	3
13	(United States) Marissa Irvin	7	6

Qualifying competition
9	(Romania) Cătălina Cristea	6	5	4
13	(United States) Marissa Irvin	0	7	6

=== Tenth qualifier ===
First round
10	(United States) Kimberly Po	6	6
(Spain) Mariam Ramón Climent	3	4
(India) Nirupama Vaidyanathan	6	6
WC	(Australia) Jaslyn Hewitt	0	2
(Spain) Eva Bes	2	6	4
(France) Stéphanie Foretz	6	2	6
(United Kingdom) Lucie Ahl	1	3
16	(Australia) Kerry-Anne Guse	6	6

Second round
10	(United States) Kimberly Po	7^{7}	3	3
(India) Nirupama Vaidyanathan	6^{5}	6	6
(France) Stéphanie Foretz	1	3
16	(Australia) Kerry-Anne Guse	6	6

Qualifying competition
(India) Nirupama Vaidyanathan	6	0	1^{r}
16	(Australia) Kerry-Anne Guse	3	6	1

=== Eleventh qualifier ===
First round
11	(Canada) Vanessa Webb	6	6
(Romania) Andreea Vanc	2	2
(Czech Republic) Libuše Průšová	6	6
(Spain) Gisela Riera	1	3
(Bulgaria) Desislava Topalova	3	6	5
(Israel) Tzipora Obziler	6	2	7
(France) Sophie Erre	3	3
14	(Italy) Francesca Lubiani	6	6

Second round
11	(Canada) Vanessa Webb	7^{7}	6
(Czech Republic) Libuše Průšová	6^{5}	2
(Israel) Tzipora Obziler	2	7^{7}	6
14	(Italy) Francesca Lubiani	6	6^{2}	2

Qualifying competition
11	(Canada) Vanessa Webb	4	6^{4}
(Israel) Tzipora Obziler	6	7^{7}

=== Twelfth qualifier ===
First round
12	(United States) Mashona Washington	6	6
(Poland) Magdalena Grzybowska	3	3
(Slovakia) Janette Husárová	7	6
(Italy) Germana Di Natale	5	1
(Russia) Lina Krasnoroutskaya	3	6	6
(Canada) Renata Kolbovic	6	4	4
(United States) Tracy Singian	6^{5}	3
19	(Hungary) Katalin Marosi	7^{7}	6

Second round
12	(United States) Mashona Washington	6	4	3
(Slovakia) Janette Husárová	4	6	6
(Russia) Lina Krasnoroutskaya	6	6
19	(Hungary) Katalin Marosi	1	2

Qualifying competition
(Slovakia) Janette Husárová	1	2
(Russia) Lina Krasnoroutskaya	6	6
