= Rodolphe Cadart =

French tennis player

- Country (sports): France
- Residence: Paris
- Born: 8 August 1978 (age 46); Reims, France
- Height: 1.83 m (6 ft 0 in)
- Turned pro: 1997
- Plays: Left-handed
- Prize money: $141,251

Singles
- Career record: 3–6
- Career titles: 0
- Highest ranking: No. 187 (11 October 1999)

Grand Slam singles results
- Australian Open: 1R (2000)

Doubles
- Career record: 0–1
- Career titles: 0
- Highest ranking: No. 221 (16 February 2004)

Grand Slam doubles results
- French Open: 1R (2003)

Rodolphe Cadart (French: [ʁɔdɔlf kadaʁ]; born 8 August 1978) is a former professional tennis player from France.

== Career ==
As a junior, Cadart made the boys' quarter-finals at the 1995 Australian Open and was also a quarter-finalist in the doubles at Wimbledon that year, partnering Jean-François Bachelot.

In the 1999 ERA Real Estate Clay Court Championships, held in Orlando, Cadart had a win over Australian Open winner Petr Korda.

Cadart lost a four set match to Stefan Koubek in the opening round of the 2000 Australian Open. It would be his only Grand Slam singles appearance, although he took part in the doubles at the 2003 French Open, with Richard Gasquet. The pair were defeated in the first round by Zimbabweans Wayne Black and Kevin Ullyett.

He had his best result on the ATP Tour in 2003, at Marseille, where he made the quarter-finals, beating world number 45 Max Mirnyi en route.

== Challenger titles ==
=== Doubles: (1) ===
No.	Year	Tournament	Surface	Partner	Opponents	Score
1.	2003	Bangalore, India	Hard	(France) Grégory Carraz	(Switzerland) Yves Allegro (France) Jean-François Bachelot	6–4, 6–4
