= 1999 US Open – Men's singles =

Men's singles
- 1999 US Open

Final
- Champion: (United States) Andre Agassi
- Runner-up: (United States) Todd Martin
- Score: 6–4, 6–7^{(5–7)}, 6–7^{(2–7)}, 6–3, 6–2

Details
- Draw: 128
- Seeds: 16

Events
| Singles | men | women | | boys | girls |
| Doubles | men | women | mixed | boys | girls |
| WC Singles | men | women | quad |
| WC Doubles | men | women | quad |
| Legends | men | women | mixed |
- US Open

Andre Agassi defeated Todd Martin in the final, 6–4, 6–7^{(5–7)}, 6–7^{(2–7)}, 6–3, 6–2 to win the men's singles tennis title at the 1999 US Open. It was his second US Open title and fifth major title overall. With the win, Agassi returned to the world No. 1 singles ranking, ultimately ending Pete Sampras' record streak of six year-end No. 1 rankings, who withdrew due to a back injury just prior to the tournament.

Pat Rafter was the two-time defending champion, but lost to Cédric Pioline in the first round after succumbing to shoulder tendinitis.

This tournament marked the first main-draw major appearance of future world No. 1 and 2003 French Open champion Juan Carlos Ferrero; he lost to Greg Rusedski in the first round.

== Seeds ==
1. (United States) Pete Sampras (withdrew due to back injury)
2. (United States) Andre Agassi (champion)
3. (Russia) Yevgeny Kafelnikov (semifinals)
4. (Australia) Pat Rafter (first round, retired due to shoulder injury)
5. (Brazil) Gustavo Kuerten (quarterfinals)
6. (United Kingdom) Tim Henman (first round)
7. (United States) Todd Martin (final)
8. (Spain) Carlos Moyá (second round)
9. (United Kingdom) Greg Rusedski (fourth round)
10. (Chile) Marcelo Ríos (fourth round)
11. (Australia) Mark Philippoussis (withdrew due to left knee injury)
12. (Netherlands) Richard Krajicek (quarterfinals)
13. (Spain) Àlex Corretja (first round)
14. (Germany) Tommy Haas (fourth round)
15. (Germany) Nicolas Kiefer (third round)
16. (Ecuador) Nicolás Lapentti (second round)
17. (Spain) Félix Mantilla (first round)

Click on the seed number of a player to go to their draw section.

== Draw ==
Key

- Q = Qualifier
- WC = Wild card
- LL = Lucky loser
- Alt = Alternate
- ITF = ITF entry
- PR = Protected ranking
- SR = Special ranking
- SE = Special exempt
- JE = Junior exempt
- JR = Junior Accelerator Programme entrant
- CO = College Accelerator Programme entrant
- NG = Next Gen Accelerator Program entrant
- w/o = Walkover
- r = Retired
- d = Defaulted

=== Finals ===
Quarterfinals
(Czech Republic) Slava Doseděl | 3 | 7 | 4 | 4
7 | (United States) Todd Martin | 6 | 5 | 6 | 6
(France) Cédric Pioline | 4 | 7^{8} | 7^{16} | 7^{10}
5 | (Brazil) Gustavo Kuerten | 6 | 6^{6} | 6^{14} | 6^{8}
12 | (Netherlands) Richard Krajicek | 6^{0} | 6^{4} | 6 | 6 | 6^{5}
3 | (Russia) Yevgeny Kafelnikov | 7^{7} | 7^{7} | 3 | 1 | 7^{7}
Q | (France) Nicolas Escudé | 6^{3} | 3 | 4
2 | (United States) Andre Agassi | 7^{7} | 6 | 6

Semifinals
7 | (United States) Todd Martin | 6 | 6 | 6
(France) Cédric Pioline | 4 | 1 | 2
3 | (Russia) Yevgeny Kafelnikov | 6 | 3 | 3 | 3
2 | (United States) Andre Agassi | 1 | 6 | 6 | 6

Final
7 | (United States) Todd Martin | 4 | 7^{7} | 7^{7} | 3 | 2
2 | (United States) Andre Agassi | 6 | 6^{5} | 6^{2} | 6 | 6

=== Top half ===
==== Section 1 ====
First round
LL | (Sweden) M Tillström | 2 | 7 | 4 | 6 | 4
(Russia) M Safin | 6 | 5 | 6 | 2 | 6
(Czech Republic) J Novák | 3 | 6 | 6 | 6
(Paraguay) R Delgado | 6 | 4 | 1 | 0
(United States) J-M Gambill | 7 | 6 | 6
(Austria) S Koubek | 5 | 1 | 4
(France) F Santoro | 5 | 6 | 6 | 1 | 7^{7}
(France) S Grosjean | 7 | 4 | 4 | 6 | 6^{2}
(Czech Republic) S Doseděl | 6 | 6 | 7^{7}
(United States) J Courier | 4 | 4 | 6^{5}
(Brazil) F Meligeni | 6 | 7 | 6
WC | (United States) K Kim | 3 | 5 | 1
Q | (Sweden) F Jonsson | 6 | 3 | 7^{7} | 7
(France) A Di Pasquale | 4 | 6 | 6^{2} | 5
(Spain) F Clavet | 3 | 5 | 6 | 4
16 | (Ecuador) N Lapentti | 6 | 7 | 4 | 6

Second round
(Russia) M Safin | 2 | 7 | 4 | 6 | 2
(Czech Republic) J Novák | 6 | 5 | 6 | 3 | 6
(United States) J-M Gambill | 4 | 2 | 6 | 7^{9} | 4^{r}
(France) F Santoro | 6 | 6 | 3 | 6^{7} | 4
(Czech Republic) S Doseděl | 7 | 6 | 6
(Brazil) F Meligeni | 5 | 1 | 3
Q | (Sweden) F Jonsson | 6 | 5 | 6 | 7
16 | (Ecuador) N Lapentti | 4 | 7 | 4 | 5

Third round
(Czech Republic) J Novák | 6 | 6 | 5
(France) F Santoro | 1 | 0 | 1^{r}
(Czech Republic) S Doseděl | 7^{7} | 7^{7} | 6
Q | (Sweden) F Jonsson | 6^{5} | 6^{5} | 3

Fourth round
(Czech Republic) J Novák | 4 | 5 | 7 | 5
(Czech Republic) S Doseděl | 6 | 7 | 5 | 7

==== Section 2 ====
First round
9 | (United Kingdom) G Rusedski | 4 | 6 | 6 | 6
(Spain) JC Ferrero | 6 | 2 | 3 | 4
(Germany) D Prinosil | 6 | 6 | 6
(Costa Rica) JA Marín | 3 | 2 | 3
WC | (United States) J Blake | 2 | 2 | 1
(United States) C Woodruff | 6 | 6 | 6
(Germany) R Schüttler | 4 | 3 | 4
(Norway) C Ruud | 6 | 6 | 6
WC | (United States) B Bryan | 3 | 6 | 3 | 4
(Sweden) M Larsson | 6 | 1 | 6 | 6
(Zimbabwe) B Black | 6^{5} | 4 | 2
(Morocco) Y El Aynaoui | 7^{7} | 6 | 6
(Armenia) S Sargsian | 3 | 1 | 3
WC | (United States) R Reneberg | 6 | 6 | 6
Q | (France) S Huet | 4 | 3 | 7^{7} | 7^{7} | 6^{3}
7 | (United States) T Martin | 6 | 6 | 6^{2} | 6^{5} | 7^{7}

Second round
9 | (United Kingdom) G Rusedski | 6 | 6 | 6
(Germany) D Prinosil | 4 | 3 | 1
(United States) C Woodruff | 6 | 6 | 6
(Norway) C Ruud | 2 | 3 | 3
(Sweden) M Larsson | 6 | 6 | 3 | 6
(Morocco) Y El Aynaoui | 3 | 4 | 6 | 3
WC | (United States) R Reneberg | 4 | 3 | 6 | 1
7 | (United States) T Martin | 6 | 6 | 3 | 6

Third round
9 | (United Kingdom) G Rusedski | 7 | 3 | 6 | 6
(United States) C Woodruff | 5 | 6 | 3 | 4
(Sweden) M Larsson | 3 | 0^{r}
7 | (United States) T Martin | 6 | 0

Fourth round
9 | (United Kingdom) G Rusedski | 7 | 6 | 6^{3} | 4 | 4
7 | (United States) T Martin | 5 | 0 | 7^{7} | 6 | 6

==== Section 3 ====
First round
4 | (Australia) P Rafter | 6 | 6 | 3 | 5 | 0^{r}
(France) C Pioline | 4 | 4 | 6 | 7 | 1
(Netherlands) J Siemerink | 1 | 7^{10} | 6 | 3 | 2
Q | (Germany) L Burgsmüller | 6 | 6^{8} | 3 | 6 | 6
(Spain) A Portas | 6 | 6^{1} | 4 | 4
(Australia) M Woodforde | 3 | 7^{7} | 6 | 6
Q | (Netherlands) P Wessels | 4 | 6 | 3 | 7^{7} | 6
(Argentina) M Zabaleta | 6 | 3 | 6 | 6^{3} | 2
(Morocco) H Arazi | 6 | 7^{7} | 1 | 6
(Morocco) K Alami | 2 | 6^{4} | 6 | 4
(Spain) F Vicente | 6 | 6 | 4 | 7^{12}
(Spain) G Puentes | 3 | 2 | 6 | 6^{10}
(Germany) B Karbacher | 6^{4} | 4 | 2
(Argentina) M Puerta | 7^{7} | 6 | 6
(Sweden) T Enqvist | 2 | 4 | 6^{6}
14 | (Germany) T Haas | 6 | 6 | 7^{8}

Second round
(France) C Pioline | 7^{7} | 1 | 6 | 3 | 6
Q | (Germany) L Burgsmüller | 6^{5} | 6 | 3 | 6 | 2
(Australia) M Woodforde | 6 | 5 | 6^{8} | 6^{4}
Q | (Netherlands) P Wessels | 3 | 7 | 7^{10} | 7^{7}
(Morocco) H Arazi | 3 | 6 | 6 | 7^{7}
(Spain) F Vicente | 6 | 3 | 3 | 6^{4}
(Argentina) M Puerta | 3 | 2 | 6 | 7^{7} | 1
14 | (Germany) T Haas | 6 | 6 | 2 | 6^{3} | 6

Third round
(France) C Pioline | 7^{7} | 7 | 4 | 7^{7}
Q | (Netherlands) P Wessels | 6^{5} | 5 | 6 | 6^{1}
(Morocco) H Arazi | 7^{9} | 3 | 4 | 6^{3}
14 | (Germany) T Haas | 6^{7} | 6 | 6 | 7^{7}

Fourth round
(France) C Pioline | 6 | 7 | 6
14 | (Germany) T Haas | 4 | 5 | 3

==== Section 4 ====
First round
17 | (Spain) F Mantilla | 6 | 1 | 2 | 4
(Sweden) M Norman | 1 | 6 | 6 | 6
(Italy) G Pozzi | 5 | 7^{7} | 6 | 6
(Canada) D Nestor | 7 | 6^{4} | 1 | 2
(Austria) M Hipfl | 6 | 6 | 6
(Australia) A Ilie | 4 | 1 | 2
(South Africa) W Ferreira | 6^{4} | 6 | 6 | 3 | 6^{5}
(Australia) R Fromberg | 7^{7} | 4 | 4 | 6 | 7^{7}
Q | (Italy) C Caratti | 3 | 6 | 2 | 6 | 6
(Spain) J Díaz | 6 | 3 | 6 | 2 | 2
(Croatia) G Ivanišević | 7 | 7^{7} | 4 | 6
Q | (Finland) V Liukko | 5 | 6^{5} | 6 | 2
(Germany) H Dreekmann | 4 | 1 | 4
(Netherlands) P Haarhuis | 6 | 6 | 6
(Czech Republic) B Ulihrach | 4 | 4 | 3
5 | (Brazil) G Kuerten | 6 | 6 | 6

Second round
(Sweden) M Norman | 6 | 6 | 6
(Italy) G Pozzi | 4 | 3 | 4
(Austria) M Hipfl | 7 | 3 | 4 | 4
(Australia) R Fromberg | 5 | 6 | 6 | 6
Q | (Italy) C Caratti | 1 | 6 | 2 | 6 | 4
(Croatia) G Ivanišević | 6 | 4 | 6 | 2 | 6
(Netherlands) P Haarhuis | 3 | 6^{4} | 6 | 2
5 | (Brazil) G Kuerten | 6 | 7^{7} | 3 | 6

Third round
(Sweden) M Norman | 4 | 6 | 6 | 6
(Australia) R Fromberg | 6 | 3 | 1 | 3
(Croatia) G Ivanišević | 4 | 2 | 4
5 | (Brazil) G Kuerten | 6 | 6 | 6

Fourth round
(Sweden) M Norman | 6^{4} | 0^{r}
5 | (Brazil) G Kuerten | 7^{7} | 0

=== Bottom half ===
==== Section 5 ====
First round
6 | (United Kingdom) T Henman | 6^{1} | 4 | 3
(Argentina) G Cañas | 7^{7} | 6 | 6
(Germany) J Knippschild | 3 | 7^{7} | 5 | 3
(United States) V Spadea | 6 | 6^{3} | 7 | 6
Q | (France) J Boutter | 5 | 1^{r}
(Spain) G Blanco | 7 | 5
LL | (Italy) L Tieleman | 6 | 7 | 6
WC | (United States) T Dent | 4 | 5 | 2
(Netherlands) J van Lottum | 6 | 7^{7} | 4 | 7^{13}
Q | (Japan) T Suzuki | 2 | 6^{4} | 6 | 6^{11}
LL | (Croatia) I Ljubičić | 6 | 6 | 6
WC | (United States) J Morrison | 1 | 2 | 4
Q | (Switzerland) L Manta | 6 | 6 | 6
(Netherlands) S Schalken | 3 | 4 | 3
WC | (United States) P King | 1 | 4 | 0
12 | (Netherlands) R Krajicek | 6 | 6 | 6

Second round
(Argentina) G Cañas | 5 | 6^{3} | 7 | 6 | 3
(United States) V Spadea | 7 | 7^{7} | 5 | 3 | 6
(Spain) G Blanco | 4 | 3 | 3
LL | (Italy) L Tieleman | 6 | 6 | 6
(Netherlands) J van Lottum | 4 | 7^{8} | 6 | 7^{7}
LL | (Croatia) I Ljubičić | 6 | 6^{6} | 3 | 6^{5}
Q | (Switzerland) L Manta | 2 | 4 | 1
12 | (Netherlands) R Krajicek | 6 | 6 | 6

Third round
(United States) V Spadea | 6 | 4 | 6^{4} | 6 | 7^{7}
LL | (Italy) L Tieleman | 2 | 6 | 7^{7} | 2 | 6^{3}
(Netherlands) J van Lottum | 4 | 1 | 4
12 | (Netherlands) R Krajicek | 6 | 6 | 6

Fourth round
(United States) V Spadea | 2 | 6^{3} | 2
12 | (Netherlands) R Krajicek | 6 | 7^{7} | 6

==== Section 6 ====
First round
13 | (Spain) À Corretja | 3 | 4 | 6 | 6 | 6^{6}
(Australia) W Arthurs | 6 | 6 | 1 | 4 | 7^{8}
(Switzerland) M Rosset | 2 | 2 | 0
(Australia) L Hewitt | 6 | 6 | 6
(Argentina) M Rodríguez | 3 | 2 | 3
(Ukraine) A Medvedev | 6 | 6 | 6
(Canada) S Lareau | 3 | 6 | 4 | 6 | 6
(Argentina) G Gaudio | 6 | 4 | 6 | 1 | 4
(United States) J Tarango | 4 | 4 | 6 | 2
(Sweden) J Björkman | 6 | 6 | 1 | 6
(Denmark) K Carlsen | 6 | 7^{7} | 6
(Argentina) H Gumy | 4 | 6^{4} | 4
LL | (Belarus) M Mirnyi | 3 | 2 | 7^{8} | 7^{7} | 6
(Czech Republic) T Zíb | 6 | 6 | 6^{6} | 6^{4} | 3
(Spain) A Martín | 1 | 6 | 3 | 4
3 | (Russia) Y Kafelnikov | 6 | 3 | 6 | 6

Second round
(Australia) W Arthurs | 2 | 4 | 7^{7} | 4
(Australia) L Hewitt | 6 | 6 | 6^{5} | 6
(Ukraine) A Medvedev | 6 | 6 | 6
(Canada) S Lareau | 4 | 1 | 0
(Sweden) J Björkman | 5 | 6 | 6 | 6
(Denmark) K Carlsen | 7 | 2 | 3 | 3
LL | (Belarus) M Mirnyi | 5 | 1 | 7^{7} | 3
3 | (Russia) Y Kafelnikov | 7 | 6 | 6^{5} | 6

Third round
(Australia) L Hewitt | 6 | 3 | 6 | 4 | 3
(Ukraine) A Medvedev | 3 | 6 | 3 | 6 | 6
(Sweden) J Björkman | 1 | 4 | 4
3 | (Russia) Y Kafelnikov | 6 | 6 | 6

Fourth round
(Ukraine) A Medvedev | 6^{5} | 1 | 0
3 | (Russia) Y Kafelnikov | 7^{7} | 6 | 6

==== Section 7 ====
First round
8 | (Spain) C Moyá | 7^{7} | 6 | 6
(Slovakia) D Hrbatý | 6^{4} | 3 | 4
(Sweden) M Gustafsson | 6 | 6 | 6^{6} | 2 | 4
Q | (France) N Escudé | 4 | 4 | 7^{8} | 6 | 6
Q | (Switzerland) I Heuberger | 4 | 3 | 6 | 6 | 3
(Philippines) C Mamiit | 6 | 6 | 3 | 3 | 6
(France) G Raoux | 6 | 6^{3} | 2 | 2
Q | (Belgium) X Malisse | 3 | 7^{7} | 6 | 6
(United States) P Goldstein | 6 | 6 | 6
(Australia) S Draper | 3 | 1 | 0
WC | (United States) M Washington | 1 | 6 | 6^{3} | 5
(Slovakia) J Krošlák | 6 | 2 | 7^{7} | 7
Q | (Switzerland) G Bastl | 7^{7} | 4 | 6 | 6
(Argentina) F Squillari | 6^{4} | 6 | 4 | 4
(Czech Republic) M Damm | 4 | 6^{5} | 6 | 7 | 1
10 | (Chile) M Ríos | 6 | 7^{7} | 3 | 5 | 6

Second round
8 | (Spain) C Moyá | 1 | 4 | 1^{r}
Q | (France) N Escudé | 6 | 6 | 0
(Philippines) C Mamiit | 6 | 3 | 7^{7} | 6^{6} | 2
Q | (Belgium) X Malisse | 3 | 6 | 6^{4} | 7^{8} | 6
(United States) P Goldstein | 7 | 4 | 4 | 3
(Slovakia) J Krošlák | 5 | 6 | 6 | 6
Q | (Switzerland) G Bastl | 6 | 3 | 2 | 3
10 | (Chile) M Ríos | 4 | 6 | 6 | 6

Third round
Q | (France) N Escudé | 6 | 6 | 6
Q | (Belgium) X Malisse | 3 | 2 | 1
(Slovakia) J Krošlák | 3 | 4 | 4
10 | (Chile) M Ríos | 6 | 6 | 6

Fourth round
Q | (France) N Escudé | 6 | 6 | 7
10 | (Chile) M Ríos | 2 | 3 | 5

==== Section 8 ====
First round
15 | (Germany) N Kiefer | 6 | 6 | 1 | 4 | 6
(Australia) J Stoltenberg | 4 | 3 | 6 | 6 | 3
Q | (Germany) M Kohlmann | 2 | 6 | 6 | 3 | 6
(Romania) A Pavel | 6 | 4 | 3 | 6 | 2
(Uruguay) M Filippini | 6 | 3 | 6 | 3 | 2
(United States) M Chang | 3 | 6 | 2 | 6 | 6
(France) A Clément | 6 | 6 | 6
(Zimbabwe) W Black | 2 | 3 | 4
(Spain) A Costa | 5 | 3 | 5
(Czech Republic) D Vacek | 7 | 6 | 7
(United States) J Gimelstob | 6 | 6 | 6
(Italy) A Gaudenzi | 1 | 3 | 2
Q | (Germany) A Pretzsch | 7 | 6 | 6
Q | (France) C Saulnier | 5 | 2 | 3
(Sweden) N Kulti | 0 | 1 | 3
2 | (United States) A Agassi | 6 | 6 | 6

Second round
15 | (Germany) N Kiefer | 6 | 6 | 6
Q | (Germany) M Kohlmann | 3 | 2 | 2
(United States) M Chang | 3 | 3 | 4
(France) A Clément | 6 | 6 | 6
(Czech Republic) D Vacek | 2 | 6 | 6 | 4 | 3
(United States) J Gimelstob | 6 | 3 | 2 | 6 | 6
Q | (Germany) A Pretzsch | 3 | 2 | 1
2 | (United States) A Agassi | 6 | 6 | 6

Third round
15 | (Germany) N Kiefer | 6 | 4 | 4 | 2
(France) A Clément | 4 | 6 | 6 | 6
(United States) J Gimelstob | 1 | 6 | 3 | 4
2 | (United States) A Agassi | 6 | 4 | 6 | 6

Fourth round
(France) A Clément | 4 | 4 | 3
2 | (United States) A Agassi | 6 | 6 | 6

| Preceded by 1999 Wimbledon Championships – Men's singles | Grand Slam men's singles | Succeeded by 2000 Australian Open – Men's singles |
