= Fredrik Jonsson =

Swedish tennis player (born 1977)

- Country (sports): Sweden
- Residence: Malmö, Sweden
- Born: 28 March 1977 (age 49) Malmö, Sweden
- Height: 1.93 m (6 ft 4 in)
- Turned pro: 1996
- Retired: 2004
- Plays: Right-handed (two-handed backhand)
- Prize money: $291,169

Singles
- Career record: 8–28
- Career titles: 0
- Highest ranking: No. 108 (17 July 2000)

Grand Slam singles results
- Australian Open: 2R (2000)
- French Open: Q3 (2001)
- Wimbledon: 1R (2000, 2001)
- US Open: 3R (1999)

Doubles
- Career record: 1–1
- Career titles: 0
- Highest ranking: No. 458 (4 October 1999)

Fredrik Jonsson (born 28 March 1977) is a retired tennis player from Sweden, who turned professional in 1996. The right-hander reached his career-high singles ranking of World No. 108 in July 2000. Jonsson comes from the same hometown as teenage colleague-star Andreas Vinciguerra.

== Tennis career ==
=== Juniors ===
As a junior, Jonsson reached as high as No. 19 in the world singles rankings in 1995. His best result was reaching the semifinals at the 1995 Junior Italian Open where he lost to the eventual champion, Mariano Zabaleta.

=== Pro career ===
Jonsson made his ATP main draw singles debut, as a qualifier, at the 1986 Swedish Open where he lost in the first round to Carlos Costa. He subsequently participated mainly on the ITF Futures circuit and the ATP Challenger Tour. In September 1998, he reached his first final on the Challenger tour, when he lost in the final of the Budva Challenger against Tomas Behrend. In October 1998, he won the Samarkand Challenger by beating Oleg Ogorodov in the final.

In Grand Slam tennis, his best performance was at the 1999 US Open, when he reached the third round and beat world number 16, Nicolás Lapentti in the second round, before losing to Slava Doseděl.

== ATP Challenger and ITF Futures finals ==
=== Singles: 7 (3–4) ===
Legend
ATP Challenger (1–3)
ITF Futures (2–1)

Result	W–L	Date	Tournament	Tier	Surface	Opponent	Score
Loss	0–1	Mar 1998	Greece F3, Chalkida	Futures	Hard	(Germany) Jan-Ralph Brandt	2–6, 1–6
Loss	0–2	Sep 1998	Budva, Yugoslavia	Challenger	Clay	(Germany) Tomas Behrend	6–3, 3–6, 2–6
Win	1–2	Sep 1998	Sweden F3, Gothenburg	Futures	Hard	(Sweden) Nicklas Timfjord	6–3, 6–4
Win	2–2	Oct 1998	Samarkand, Uzbekistan	Challenger	Clay	(Uzbekistan) Oleg Ogorodov	7–6, 6–3
Loss	2–3	Aug 1999	Poznań, Poland	Challenger	Clay	(Spain) Galo Blanco	4–6, 2–6
Win	3–3	Apr 2001	USA F8, Little Rock, Arkansas	Futures	Hard	(Netherlands) Martin Verkerk	6–3, 6–4
Loss	3–4	May 2001	Fergana, Uzbekistan	Challenger	Hard	(Switzerland) Ivo Heuberger	6–4, 5–7, 2–6
