= 2000 Australian Open – Men's doubles =

Tennis tournament

Men's doubles
- 2000 Australian Open

Final
- Champions: (South Africa) Ellis Ferreira (United States) Rick Leach
- Runners-up: (Zimbabwe) Wayne Black (Australia) Andrew Kratzmann
- Score: 6–4, 3–6, 6–3, 3–6, 18–16

Details
- Draw: 64
- Seeds: 16

Events
Singles	men	women		boys	girls
Doubles	men	women	mixed	boys	girls
WC Singles	men	women	quad
WC Doubles	men	women	quad
Legends	men	women	mixed
- Australian Open

The 2000 Australian Open was a tennis tournament played on outdoor hard courts at Melbourne Park in Melbourne in Australia. It was the 88th edition of the Australian Open and was held from 17 through 30 January 2000.

== Seeds ==
Champion seeds are indicated in bold text while text in italics indicates the round in which those seeds were eliminated.

1. (Canada) Sébastien Lareau / (India) Leander Paes (first round)
2. (Australia) Todd Woodbridge / (Australia) Mark Woodforde (quarterfinals)
3. (Sweden) Jonas Björkman / (Zimbabwe) Byron Black (second round)
4. (United States) Alex O'Brien / (United States) Jared Palmer (semifinals)
5. (South Africa) **Ellis Ferreira** / (United States) **Rick Leach (champions)**
6. (South Africa) David Adams / (South Africa) John-Laffnie de Jager (second round)
7. (United States) Jeff Tarango / (Czech Republic) Daniel Vacek (first round)
8. (Zimbabwe) Wayne Black / (Australia) Andrew Kratzmann (final)
9. (France) Olivier Delaître / (France) Fabrice Santoro (first round)
10. (South Africa) Piet Norval / (Zimbabwe) Kevin Ullyett (second round)
11. (Czech Republic) Jiří Novák / (Czech Republic) David Rikl (quarterfinals)
12. (Sweden) Nicklas Kulti / (Sweden) Mikael Tillström (third round)
13. Unknown (withdrew)
14. (Czech Republic) Martin Damm / (Belarus) Max Mirnyi (third round)
15. (South Africa) Wayne Ferreira / (Russia) Yevgeny Kafelnikov (third round)
16. (Australia) David Macpherson / (Sweden) Peter Nyborg (third round)

== Draw ==
Key

- Q = Qualifier
- WC = Wild card
- LL = Lucky loser
- Alt = Alternate
- ITF = ITF entry
- PR = Protected ranking
- SR = Special ranking
- SE = Special exempt
- JE = Junior exempt
- JR = Junior Accelerator Programme entrant
- CO = College Accelerator Programme entrant
- NG = Next Gen Accelerator Program entrant
- w/o = Walkover
- r = Retired
- d = Defaulted

=== Finals ===
Quarterfinals
(South Africa) Marius Barnard (South Africa) Chris Haggard	**6**	6^{8}	3
8	(Zimbabwe) **Wayne Black** **(Australia) Andrew Kratzmann**	3	**7**	**6**
4	(United States) **Alex O'Brien** **(United States) Jared Palmer**	**6**	**6**
11	(Czech Republic) Jiří Novák (Czech Republic) David Rikl	1	3
5	(South Africa) **Ellis Ferreira** **(United States) Rick Leach**	**7**	5	**7**
(Australia) Joshua Eagle (Australia) Andrew Florent	6^{14}	**7**	5
(Portugal) Nuno Marques (Belgium) Tom Vanhoudt	3	2
2	(Australia) **Todd Woodbridge** **(Australia) Mark Woodforde**	**6**	**6**

Semifinals
8	(Zimbabwe) **Wayne Black** **(Australia) Andrew Kratzmann**	**7**	**6**
4	(United States) Alex O'Brien (United States) Jared Palmer	6^{6}	3
5	(South Africa) **Ellis Ferreira** **(United States) Rick Leach**	4	**6**	**6**
2	(Australia) Todd Woodbridge (Australia) Mark Woodforde	**6**	3	4

Final
8	(Zimbabwe) Wayne Black (Australia) Andrew Kratzmann	4	**6**	3	**6**	16
5	(South Africa) **Ellis Ferreira** (United States) Rick Leach	**6**	3	**6**	3	**18**

=== Top half ===
==== Section 1 ====
First round
(United States) **G Grant** **(United States) J Waite**	**7**	2	**7**
1	(Canada) S Lareau (India) L Paes	6^{2}	**6**	5
(South Africa) **M Barnard** **(South Africa) C Haggard**	**6**	**6**
(Spain) A Martín (Argentina) M Rodríguez	4	4
(Slovakia) **D Hrbatý** **(Philippines) E Taino**	**6**	6^{3}	**6**
(United States) L Jensen (United States) M Jensen	4	**7**	2
16	(Australia) **D Macpherson** **(Sweden) P Nyborg**	**6**	**7**
(United Kingdom) N Broad (Switzerland) R Federer	4	6^{4}
10	(South Africa) **P Norval** **(Zimbabwe) K Ullyett**	**7**	**7**
(Australia) W Arthurs (Spain) J Balcells	6^{2}	6^{2}
(Australia) **L Hewitt** **(Australia) S Stolle**	**7**	**6**
(United States) P Galbraith (United States) B MacPhie	6^{3}	4
(Australia) **M Hill** **(South Africa) M Ondruska**	**6**	6^{0}	**6**
(Australia) C Rae (Australia) S Swierk	4	**7**	3
8	(Zimbabwe) **W Black** **(Australia) A Kratzmann**	**7**	**6**
(Brazil) F Meligeni (Brazil) C Testa	6^{8}	4

Second round
(United States) G Grant (United States) J Waite	**7**	2	8
(South Africa) **M Barnard** **(South Africa) C Haggard**	5	**6**	10
(Slovakia) D Hrbatý (Philippines) E Taino	4	4
16	(Australia) **D Macpherson** **(Sweden) P Nyborg**	**6**	**6**
10	(South Africa) P Norval (Zimbabwe) K Ullyett	5	**7**	4
(Australia) **L Hewitt** **(Australia) S Stolle**	**7**	6^{4}	**6**
(Australia) M Hill (South Africa) M Ondruska	**6**	5	3
8	(Zimbabwe) **W Black** **(Australia) A Kratzmann**	1	**7**	**6**

Third round
(South Africa) **M Barnard** **(South Africa) C Haggard**	**6**	2	**6**
16	(Australia) D Macpherson (Sweden) P Nyborg	3	**6**	4
(Australia) L Hewitt (Australia) S Stolle	4	4
8	(Zimbabwe) **W Black** **(Australia) A Kratzmann**	**6**	**6**

Quarterfinals
(South Africa) M Barnard (South Africa) C Haggard	**6**	6^{8}	3
8	(Zimbabwe) **W Black** **(Australia) A Kratzmann**	3	**7**	**6**

==== Section 2 ====
First round
4	(United States) **A O'Brien** **(United States) J Palmer**	**6**	**6**
(Czech Republic) P Pála (Czech Republic) P Vízner	3	2
(Japan) **T Shimada** **(South Africa) M Wakefield**	**6**	6^{3}	**6**
(Spain) A Berasategui (Spain) F Roig	4	**7**	3
(United States) **J-M Gambill** **(United States) S Humphries**	**7**	**6**
(Italy) M Bertolini (Italy) C Brandi	5	3
(Australia) **P Kilderry** **(Australia) G Silcock**	0	**7**	**6**
(Australia) T Crichton (Australia) T Perry	**6**	5	3
11	(Czech Republic) **J Novák** **(Czech Republic) D Rikl**	6^{9}	**6**	**6**
(Australia) A Fisher (Australia) S Randjelovic	**7**	2	4
(Spain) **Á López Morón** **(Spain) A Portas**	**7**	**6**
(Argentina) M García (Argentina) M Puerta	6^{5}	4
(Sweden) **S Aspelin** **(Sweden) J Landsberg**	**6**	3	**6**
(Argentina) M Hood (Argentina) S Prieto	2	**6**	3
6	(South Africa) **D Adams** **(South Africa) J-L de Jager**	**7**	**7**
(New Zealand) J Greenhalgh (Germany) M Kohlmann	5	6^{6}

Second round
4	(United States) **A O'Brien** **(United States) J Palmer**	**6**	**6**
(Japan) T Shimada (South Africa) M Wakefield	3	4
(United States) **J-M Gambill** **(United States) S Humphries**	**6**	**6**
(Australia) P Kilderry (Australia) G Silcock	0	4
11	(Czech Republic) **J Novák** **(Czech Republic) D Rikl**	**6**	**6**
(Spain) Á López Morón (Spain) A Portas	3	;0
(Sweden) **S Aspelin** **(Sweden) J Landsberg**	**7**	4	10
6	(South Africa) D Adams (South Africa) J-L de Jager	6^{4}	**6**	8

Third round
4	(United States) **A O'Brien** **(United States) J Palmer**	3	**6**	9
(United States) J-M Gambill (United States) S Humphries	**6**	2	**7**
11	(Czech Republic) **J Novák** **(Czech Republic) D Rikl**	4	**6**	8
(Sweden) S Aspelin (Sweden) J Landsberg	**6**	2	**6**

Quarterfinals
4	(United States) **A O'Brien** **(United States) J Palmer**	**6**	**6**
11	(Czech Republic) J Novák (Czech Republic) D Rikl	1	3

=== Bottom half ===
==== Section 3 ====
First round
5	(South Africa) **E Ferreira** **(United States) R Leach**	**6**	**6**
(Croatia) G Ivanišević (United States) M Keil	3	4
(South Africa) **L Bale** **(South Africa) G Stafford**	**6**	**7**
(United States) A Peterson (United States) M Sell	3	6^{5}
(Australia) **M Draper** **(Australia) S Draper**	**7**	**6**
(Brazil) J Oncins (Argentina) D Orsanic	6^{6}	4
12	(Sweden) **N Kulti** **(Sweden) M Tillström**	**7**	3	**6**
(Israel) N Behr (Israel) E Ran	5	**6**	1
14	(Czech Republic) **M Damm** **(Belarus) M Mirnyi**	**7**	**6**
(United States) P Goldstein (United States) M Sprengelmeyer	6^{5}	4
(Australia) **P Hanley** **(Australia) N Healey**	**6**	**6**
(Australia) A Ilie (Australia) J Sirianni	1	2
(Australia) **J Eagle** **(Australia) A Florent**	**6**	5	**6**
(The Bahamas) M Knowles (Socialist Federal Republic of Yugoslavia) N Zimonjić	3	**7**	4
3	(Sweden) **Jonas Björkman** **(Zimbabwe) Byron Black**	**6**	**6**
(Argentina) Guillermo Cañas (Argentina) Diego del Río	3	4

Second round
5	(South Africa) **E Ferreira** **(United States) R Leach**	**6**	3	**7**
(South Africa) L Bale (South Africa) G Stafford	3	**6**	5
(Australia) M Draper (Australia) S Draper	3	**6**	1
12	(Sweden) **N Kulti** **(Sweden) M Tillström**	**6**	4	**6**
14	(Czech Republic) **M Damm** **(Belarus) M Mirnyi**	**7**	**6**
(Australia) P Hanley (Australia) N Healey	6^{5}	4
(Australia) **J Eagle** **(Australia) A Florent**	5	**6**	**6**
3	(Sweden) Jonas Björkman (Zimbabwe) Byron Black	**7**	4	2

Third round
5	(South Africa) **E Ferreira** **(United States) R Leach**	**6**	**6**
12	(Sweden) N Kulti (Sweden) M Tillström	3	3
14	(Czech Republic) M Damm (Belarus) M Mirnyi	**6**	6^{5}	2
(Australia) **J Eagle** **(Australia) A Florent**	2	**7**	**6**

Quarterfinals
5	(South Africa) **E Ferreira** **(United States) R Leach**	**7**	5	**7**
(Australia) J Eagle (Australia) A Florent	6^{14}	**7**	5

==== Section 4 ====
First round
(Russia) **A Olhovskiy** **(Netherlands) J Siemerink**	6^{3}	**6**	**6**
7	(United States) J Tarango (Czech Republic) D Vacek	**7**	1	3
(Portugal) **N Marques** **(Belgium) T Vanhoudt**	6^{6}	**6**	**6**
(North Macedonia) A Kitinov (Switzerland) L Manta	**7**	3	4
(South Africa) **R Koenig** **(Australia) P Tramacchi**	**6**	4	**7**
(United States) B Bryan (United States) M Bryan	4	**6**	5
(Australia) **B Ellwood** **(Australia) M Tebbutt**	**6**	**7**
9	(France) O Delaître (France) F Santoro	3	6^{6}
15	(South Africa) **W Ferreira** **(Russia) Y Kafelnikov**	4	**6**	**6**
(Spain) JI Carrasco (Spain) J Velasco Jr.	**6**	3	3
(United States) **B Coupe** **(Socialist Federal Republic of Yugoslavia) D Vemić**	**7**	**6**
(Socialist Federal Republic of Yugoslavia) N Djordjevic (Russia) M Safin	5	4
(United States) **D Bowen** **(Mexico) A Hernández**	**7**	**6**
(The Bahamas) M Merklein (United States) F Montana	6^{5}	3
2	(Australia) **T Woodbridge** **(Australia) M Woodforde**	**7**	**6**
(South Africa) J Coetzee (South Africa) B Haygarth	6^{4}	3

Second round
(Russia) A Olhovskiy (Netherlands) J Siemerink	6^{8}	**7**	1
(Portugal) **N Marques** **(Belgium) T Vanhoudt**	**7**	6^{5}	**6**
(South Africa) R Koenig (Australia) P Tramacchi	6^{5}	2
(Australia) **B Ellwood** **(Australia) M Tebbutt**	**7**	**6**
15	(South Africa) **W Ferreira** **(Russia) Y Kafelnikov**	**6**	**6**
(United States) B Coupe (Socialist Federal Republic of Yugoslavia) D Vemić	4	3
(United States) D Bowen (Mexico) A Hernández	2	2
2	(Australia) **T Woodbridge** **(Australia) M Woodforde**	**6**	**6**

Third round
(Portugal) **N Marques** **(Belgium) T Vanhoudt**	3	**6**	**6**
(Australia) B Ellwood (Australia) M Tebbutt	**6**	3	4
15	(South Africa) W Ferreira (Russia) Y Kafelnikov	3	**6**	3
2	(Australia) **T Woodbridge** **(Australia) M Woodforde**	**6**	4	**6**

Quarterfinals
(Portugal) N Marques (Belgium) T Vanhoudt	3	2
2	(Australia) **T Woodbridge** **(Australia) M Woodforde**	**6**	**6**
