= 2000 Australian Open – Women's doubles =

Tennis tournament

Women's doubles
- 2000 Australian Open

Final
- Champions: (United States) Lisa Raymond (Australia) Rennae Stubbs
- Runners-up: (Switzerland) Martina Hingis (France) Mary Pierce
- Score: 6–4, 5–7, 6–4

Details
- Draw: 64
- Seeds: 16

Events
Singles	men	women		boys	girls
Doubles	men	women	mixed	boys	girls
WC Singles	men	women	quad
WC Doubles	men	women	quad
Legends	men	women	mixed
- Australian Open

Martina Hingis and Anna Kournikova were the defending champions, but competed this year with different partners. Hingis partnered with Mary Pierce and finished the tournament as runners-up, while Kournikova teamed up with Barbara Schett and lost in semifinals to Lisa Raymond and Rennae Stubbs.

Raymond and Stubbs won the title, defeating Hingis and Pierce 6–4, 5–7, 6–4 in the final. It was the 1st Grand Slam doubles title and 15th title overall for Raymond, and the 1st Grand Slam doubles title and 21st title overall for Stubbs, in their respective careers.

== Seeds ==
1. (United States) Lisa Raymond / (Australia) Rennae Stubbs (champions)
2. (United States) Lindsay Davenport / (United States) Corina Morariu (semifinals, retired)
3. (Switzerland) Martina Hingis / (France) Mary Pierce (final)
4. (France) Alexandra Fusai / (France) Nathalie Tauziat (second round)
5. (Romania) Irina Spîrlea / (Netherlands) Caroline Vis (second round)
6. (Russia) Anna Kournikova / (Austria) Barbara Schett (semifinals)
7. (South Africa) Amanda Coetzer / (Russia) Elena Likhovtseva (third round)
8. (Spain) Conchita Martínez / (Argentina) Patricia Tarabini (second round)
9. (United States) Chanda Rubin / (France) Sandrine Testud (second round)
10. (France) Julie Halard-Decugis / (Japan) Ai Sugiyama (quarterfinals)
11. (United States) Nicole Arendt / (United States) Kimberly Po (first round)
12. (Germany) Anke Huber / (Ukraine) Elena Tatarkova (first round)
13. (Slovenia) Tina Križan / (Slovenia) Katarina Srebotnik (first round)
14. (Spain) Virginia Ruano Pascual / (Argentina) Paola Suárez (second round)
15. (Slovakia) Karina Habšudová / (France) Anne-Gaëlle Sidot (second round)
16. (Zimbabwe) Cara Black / (Kazakhstan) Irina Selyutina (first round)

== Draw ==
Key

- Q = Qualifier
- WC = Wild card
- LL = Lucky loser
- Alt = Alternate
- ITF = ITF entry
- PR = Protected ranking
- SR = Special ranking
- SE = Special exempt
- JE = Junior exempt
- JR = Junior Accelerator Programme entrant
- CO = College Accelerator Programme entrant
- NG = Next Gen Accelerator Program entrant
- w/o = Walkover
- r = Retired
- d = Defaulted

=== Finals ===
Quarterfinals
1	(United States) Lisa Raymond (Australia) Rennae Stubbs	6	6
(United States) Erika deLone (Australia) Nicole Pratt	2	2
(Belgium) Els Callens (Belgium) Dominique van Roost	1	6^{4}
6	(Russia) Anna Kournikova (Austria) Barbara Schett	6	7^{7}
(United States) Debbie Graham (Japan) Nana Miyagi	3	1
3	(Switzerland) Martina Hingis (France) Mary Pierce	6	6
10	(France) Julie Halard-Decugis (Japan) Ai Sugiyama	4	6	1
2	(United States) Lindsay Davenport (United States) Corina Morariu	6	3	6

Semifinals
1	(United States) Lisa Raymond (Australia) Rennae Stubbs	6	7^{7}
6	(Russia) Anna Kournikova (Austria) Barbara Schett	4	6^{4}
3	(Switzerland) Martina Hingis (France) Mary Pierce	5
2	(United States) Lindsay Davenport (United States) Corina Morariu	0^{r}

Final
1	(United States) Lisa Raymond (Australia) Rennae Stubbs	6	5	6
3	(Switzerland) Martina Hingis (France) Mary Pierce	4	7	4

=== Top half ===
==== Section 1 ====
First round
1	(United States) L Raymond (Australia) R Stubbs	4	7	6
(Australia) L Pleming (Croatia) I Majoli	6	5	1
(Bulgaria) S Krivencheva (Chinese Taipei) S-t Wang	4	6^{2}
(Hungary) V Csurgó (Czech Republic) E Martincová	6	7^{7}
(France) A Cocheteux (Slovakia) J Husárová	2	2
(Argentina) F Labat (Thailand) T Tanasugarn	6	6
(Spain) E Bes (Spain) G Riera	3	5
9	(United States) C Rubin (France) S Testud	6	7
11	(United States) N Arendt (United States) K Po	4	4
(Australia) A Ellwood (Japan) R Hiraki	6	6
(Romania) C Cristea (Romania) R Dragomir	3	7^{12}	7
WC	(Australia) E Dominikovic (Australia) A Grahame	6	6^{10}	5
(United States) E deLone (Australia) N Pratt	6	6
(Switzerland) E Gagliardi (United States) S Reeves	2	4
(Australia) R McQuillan (Australia) L McShea	6^{2}	7^{7}	4
8	(Spain) C Martínez (Argentina) P Tarabini	7^{7}	6^{4}	6

Second round
1	(United States) L Raymond (Australia) R Stubbs	6	6
(Hungary) V Csurgó (Czech Republic) E Martincová	0	0
(Argentina) F Labat (Thailand) T Tanasugarn	6	7
9	(United States) C Rubin (France) S Testud	3	5
(Australia) A Ellwood (Japan) R Hiraki	6	2	6
(Romania) C Cristea (Romania) R Dragomir	4	6	4
(United States) E deLone (Australia) N Pratt	6	4	7
8	(Spain) C Martínez (Argentina) P Tarabini	3	6	5

Third round
1	(United States) L Raymond (Australia) R Stubbs	6	4	6
(Argentina) F Labat (Thailand) T Tanasugarn	1	6	1
(Australia) A Ellwood (Japan) R Hiraki	3	6	3
(United States) E deLone (Australia) N Pratt	6	2	6

Quarterfinals
1	(United States) L Raymond (Australia) R Stubbs	6	6
(United States) E deLone (Australia) N Pratt	2	2

==== Section 2 ====
First round
4	(France) A Fusai (France) N Tauziat	6	6
(Federal Republic of Yugoslavia) S Načuk (Czech Republic) L Němečková	4	1
(Spain) A Sánchez Vicario (Spain) M Serna	2	4
(Belgium) E Callens (Belgium) D van Roost	6	6
(United States) J Capriati (Australia) J Dokic	6	6
(Spain) RM Andrés Rodríguez (Spain) C Martínez Granados	2	0
(Netherlands) K Boogert (Netherlands) M Oremans	5	6	1
15	(Slovakia) K Habšudová (France) A-G Sidot	7	1	6
14	(Spain) V Ruano Pascual (Argentina) P Suárez	6	6
WC	(Australia) M Adamczak (Australia) C Watson	4	1
(Czech Republic) K Hrdličková (Germany) B Rittner	3	0^{r}
(Canada) S Jeyaseelan (Switzerland) P Schnyder	6	0
(Belgium) L Courtois (France) A Mauresmo	6	3	6
(Austria) B Schwartz (Austria) P Wartusch	4	6	3
(United States) A Frazier (United States) K Schlukebir	3	3
6	(Russia) A Kournikova (Austria) B Schett	6	6

Second round
4	(France) A Fusai (France) N Tauziat	3	3
(Belgium) E Callens (Belgium) D van Roost	6	6
(United States) J Capriati (Australia) J Dokic	7^{7}	6
15	(Slovakia) K Habšudová (France) A-G Sidot	6^{4}	4
14	(Spain) V Ruano Pascual (Argentina) P Suárez	1	7^{7}	3
(Canada) S Jeyaseelan (Switzerland) P Schnyder	6	6^{4}	6
(Belgium) L Courtois (France) A Mauresmo	3	1
6	(Russia) A Kournikova (Austria) B Schett	6	6

Third round
(Belgium) E Callens (Belgium) D van Roost	6	7^{14}
(United States) J Capriati (Australia) J Dokic	4	6^{12}
(Canada) S Jeyaseelan (Switzerland) P Schnyder	2	1
6	(Russia) A Kournikova (Austria) B Schett	6	6

Quarterfinals
(Belgium) E Callens (Belgium) D van Roost	1	6^{4}
6	(Russia) A Kournikova (Austria) B Schett	6	7^{7}

=== Bottom half ===
==== Section 3 ====
First round
5	(Romania) I Spîrlea (Netherlands) C Vis	6	6
(Romania) M Mihalache (Slovakia) Z Váleková	3	2
(United States) D Graham (Japan) M Miyagi	4	6	6
(Indonesia) Y Basuki (France) A Dechaume-Balleret	6	1	4
(Belarus) O Barabanschikova (United States) L Osterloh	2	0
(France) N Dechy (Australia) A Molik	6	6
(Italy) T Garbin (Hungary) K Marosi	6	7
13	(Slovenia) T Križan (Slovenia) K Srebotnik	3	5
12	(Germany) A Huber (Ukraine) E Tatarkova	6	1	4
(Australia) T Musgrave (Australia) B Stewart	2	6	6
(Australia) K-A Guse (Australia) K Kunce	6	6
WC	(Australia) MA Clayton (Australia) C Wheeler	3	3
(United States) M Shaughnessy (United States) L Wild	6	4	6
(Belgium) K Clijsters (Slovakia) H Nagyová	0	6	1
(Netherlands) A Hopmans (Netherlands) S Noorlander	1	0
3	(Switzerland) M Hingis (France) M Pierce	6	6

Second round
5	(Romania) I Spîrlea (Netherlands) C Vis	6^{8}	3
(United States) D Graham (Japan) M Miyagi	7^{10}	6
(France) N Dechy (Australia) A Molik	6^{13}	6^{1}
(Italy) T Garbin (Hungary) K Marosi	7^{15}	7^{7}
(Australia) T Musgrave (Australia) B Stewart	6	6
(Australia) K-A Guse (Australia) K Kunce	4	1
(United States) M Shaughnessy (United States) L Wild	3	2
3	(Switzerland) M Hingis (France) M Pierce	6	6

Third round
(United States) D Graham (Japan) M Miyagi	6^{2}	7	6
(Italy) T Garbin (Hungary) K Marosi	7^{7}	5	0
(Australia) T Musgrave (Australia) B Stewart	1	1
3	(Switzerland) M Hingis (France) M Pierce	6	6

Quarterfinals
(United States) D Graham (Japan) M Miyagi	3	1
3	(Switzerland) M Hingis (France) M Pierce	6	6

==== Section 4 ====
First round
7	(South Africa) A Coetzer (Russia) E Likhovtseva	6	6^{2}	6
(Australia) C Barclay (Canada) V Webb	4	7^{7}	3
(Spain) Alicia Ortuño (Spain) C Torrens Valero	3	2
WC	(Poland) M Grzybowska (United States) T Snyder	6	6
(Croatia) J Kostanić (Slovenia) T Pisnik	5	6	6
(South Africa) S De Beer (Germany) J Kandarr	7	4	8
(South Africa) N de Villiers (South Africa) J Steck	2	3
10	(France) J Halard-Decugis (Japan) A Sugiyama	6	6
16	(Zimbabwe) C Black (Kazakhstan) I Selyutina	4	4
(Belgium) S Appelmans (Italy) R Grande	6	6
(Belarus) N Ostrovskaya (Belarus) T Poutchek	4	0
(Croatia) M Lučić (Belarus) N Zvereva	6	6
(Sweden) Å Carlsson (France) É Loit	6	7^{7}
(Japan) S Asagoe (Japan) Y Yoshida	1	6^{3}
(Russia) A Jidkova (Canada) R Kolbovic	3	1
2	(United States) L Davenport (United States) C Morariu	6	6

Second round
7	(South Africa) A Coetzer (Russia) E Likhovtseva	7	6
WC	(Poland) M Grzybowska (United States) T Snyder	5	4
(South Africa) S De Beer (Germany) J Kandarr	6	0^{r}
10	(France) J Halard-Decugis (Japan) A Sugiyama	2	1
(Belgium) S Appelmans (Italy) R Grande	6	6
(Croatia) M Lučić (Belarus) N Zvereva	2	3
(Sweden) Å Carlsson (France) É Loit	1	0
2	(United States) L Davenport (United States) C Morariu	6	6

Third round
7	(South Africa) A Coetzer (Russia) E Likhovtseva	6	1	5
10	(France) J Halard-Decugis (Japan) A Sugiyama	4	6	7
(Belgium) S Appelmans (Italy) R Grande	0	1
2	(United States) L Davenport (United States) C Morariu	6	6

Quarterfinals
10	(France) J Halard-Decugis (Japan) A Sugiyama	4	6	1
2	(United States) L Davenport (United States) C Morariu	6	3	6
