= 2000 Australian Open – Women's singles =

Women's singles
- 2000 Australian Open

Final
- Champion: (United States) Lindsay Davenport
- Runner-up: (Switzerland) Martina Hingis
- Score: 6–1, 7–5

Details
- Draw: 128
- Seeds: 16

Events
| Singles | men | women | | boys | girls |
| Doubles | men | women | mixed | boys | girls |
| WC Singles | men | women | quad |
| WC Doubles | men | women | quad |
| Legends | men | women | mixed |
- Australian Open

Lindsay Davenport defeated three-time defending champion Martina Hingis in the final, 6–1, 7–5 to win the women's singles tennis title at the 2000 Australian Open. It was her first Australian Open title and her third and last major singles title. Davenport did not lose a set during the tournament; in all three of her major title runs, she did not drop a set en route. Hingis' loss ended her 27-match win streak at the Australian Open.

== Seeds ==
1. (Switzerland) Martina Hingis (final)
2. (United States) Lindsay Davenport (champion)
3. (United States) Serena Williams (fourth round)
4. (France) Mary Pierce (fourth round)
5. (France) Nathalie Tauziat (second round)
6. (Austria) Barbara Schett (fourth round)
7. (France) Amélie Mauresmo (second round)
8. (South Africa) Amanda Coetzer (second round)
9. (France) Julie Halard-Decugis (quarterfinals)
10. (Spain) Conchita Martínez (semifinals)
11. (Russia) Anna Kournikova (fourth round)
12. (France) Sandrine Testud (fourth round)
13. (Spain) Arantxa Sánchez Vicario (quarterfinals)
14. (Belgium) Dominique Van Roost (second round)
15. (Germany) Anke Huber (first round)
16. (Russia) Elena Likhovtseva (quarterfinals)

== Draw ==
Key

- Q = Qualifier
- WC = Wild card
- LL = Lucky loser
- Alt = Alternate
- ITF = ITF entry
- PR = Protected ranking
- SR = Special ranking
- SE = Special exempt
- JE = Junior exempt
- JR = Junior Accelerator Programme entrant
- CO = College Accelerator Programme entrant
- NG = Next Gen Accelerator Program entrant
- w/o = Walkover
- r = Retired
- d = Defaulted

=== Finals ===
Quarterfinals
1 | (Switzerland) Martina Hingis | 6 | 6
13 | (Spain) Arantxa Sánchez Vicario | 1 | 1
16 | (Russia) Elena Likhovtseva | 3 | 6 | 7
10 | (Spain) Conchita Martínez | 6 | 4 | 9
(United States) Jennifer Capriati | 6 | 6
(Japan) Ai Sugiyama | 0 | 2
9 | (France) Julie Halard-Decugis | 1 | 2
2 | (United States) Lindsay Davenport | 6 | 6

Semifinals
1 | (Switzerland) Martina Hingis | 6 | 6
10 | (Spain) Conchita Martínez | 3 | 2
(United States) Jennifer Capriati | 2 | 6^{4}
2 | (United States) Lindsay Davenport | 6 | 7^{7}

Final
1 | (Switzerland) Martina Hingis | 1 | 5
2 | (United States) Lindsay Davenport | 6 | 7

=== Top half ===
==== Section 1 ====
First round
1 | (Switzerland) M Hingis | 6 | 6
(Croatia) M Lučić | 1 | 2
(Belgium) J Henin | 6 | 6
Q | (Australia) K-A Guse | 4 | 2
(United States) J Watanabe | 0 | 1
(Slovakia) K Habšudová | 6 | 6
(Croatia) S Talaja | 1 | 7 | 5
(Australia) A Molik | 6 | 5 | 7
(Thailand) T Tanasugarn | 6 | 6
(Italy) R Grande | 3 | 4
(Slovenia) K Srebotnik | 4 | 6 | 4
(Canada) J Nejedly | 6 | 1 | 6
(Mexico) A Gavaldón | 6 | 4 | 6
Q | (Israel) T Obziler | 4 | 6 | 4
(Hungary) P Mandula | 3 | 6 | 3
12 | (France) S Testud | 6 | 4 | 6

Second round
1 | (Switzerland) M Hingis | 6 | 6
(Belgium) J Henin | 3 | 3
(Slovakia) K Habšudová | 2 | 3
(Australia) A Molik | 6 | 6
(Thailand) T Tanasugarn | 7 | 6
(Canada) J Nejedly | 5 | 4
(Mexico) A Gavaldón | 1 | 2
12 | (France) S Testud | 6 | 6

Third round
1 | (Switzerland) M Hingis | 6 | 6
(Australia) A Molik | 2 | 3
(Thailand) T Tanasugarn | 6 | 5 | 2
12 | (France) S Testud | 4 | 7 | 6

Fourth round
1 | (Switzerland) M Hingis | 6 | 7^{7}
12 | (France) S Testud | 1 | 6^{3}

==== Section 2 ====
First round
13 | (Spain) A Sánchez Vicario | 6 | 6
(Germany) J Abe | 2 | 2
Q | (France) A Fusai | 7 | 4 | 4
(United States) L Raymond | 5 | 6 | 6
(France) A Dechaume-Balleret | 2 | 0
(Switzerland) E Gagliardi | 6 | 6
WC | (Australia) B Stewart | 7 | 6
(Venezuela) M-A Vento | 5 | 3
(Slovakia) Ľ Cervanová | 2 | 3
Q | (Argentina) F Labat | 6 | 6
(Spain) M Serna | 6 | 6
(Canada) M Drake | 4 | 2
WC | (Australia) L McShea | 1 | 4
(Switzerland) M Vavrinec | 6 | 6
(United States) M Tu | 2 | 7^{7} | 4
6 | (Austria) B Schett | 6 | 6^{1} | 6

Second round
13 | (Spain) A Sánchez Vicario | 6 | 3 | 6
(United States) L Raymond | 1 | 6 | 3
(Switzerland) E Gagliardi | 6 | 4 | 4
WC | (Australia) B Stewart | 2 | 6 | 6
Q | (Argentina) F Labat | 7^{7} | 7
(Spain) M Serna | 6^{3} | 5
(Switzerland) M Vavrinec | 4 | 4
6 | (Austria) B Schett | 6 | 6

Third round
13 | (Spain) A Sánchez Vicario | 7 | 6
WC | (Australia) B Stewart | 5 | 1
Q | (Argentina) F Labat | 1 | 3
6 | (Austria) B Schett | 6 | 6

Fourth round
13 | (Spain) A Sánchez Vicario | 1 | 6 | 7
6 | (Austria) B Schett | 6 | 0 | 5

==== Section 3 ====
First round
3 | (United States) S Williams | 6 | 4 | 6
WC | (Australia) A Grahame | 4 | 6 | 4
(Spain) M Sánchez Lorenzo | 3 | 0
(Australia) N Pratt | 6 | 6
(Belgium) S Appelmans | 6 | 6
(Australia) A Ellwood | 2 | 2
(United States) C Rubin | 6 | 6
(Israel) A Smashnova | 3 | 4
(United States) A Frazier | 1 | 3
(Belgium) E Callens | 6 | 6
WC | (France) V Razzano | 6^{10} | 2
(Czech Republic) D Chládková | 7^{12} | 6
(United States) T Snyder | 0 | 6 | 8
(United States) M Shaughnessy | 6 | 1 | 10
(Bulgaria) P Nola | 2 | 2
16 | (Russia) E Likhovtseva | 6 | 6

Second round
3 | (United States) S Williams | 7 | 6
(Australia) N Pratt | 5 | 1
(Belgium) S Appelmans | 6 | 3 | 6
(United States) C Rubin | 1 | 6 | 3
(Belgium) E Callens | 2 | 7 | 6
(Czech Republic) D Chládková | 6 | 5 | 4
(United States) M Shaughnessy | 3 | 5
16 | (Russia) E Likhovtseva | 6 | 7

Third round
3 | (United States) S Williams | 6 | 7^{7}
(Belgium) S Appelmans | 2 | 6^{2}
(Belgium) E Callens | 7 | 6^{5} | 3
16 | (Russia) E Likhovtseva | 5 | 7^{7} | 6

Fourth round
3 | (United States) S Williams | 3 | 3
16 | (Russia) E Likhovtseva | 6 | 6

==== Section 4 ====
First round
10 | (Spain) C Martínez | 6 | 6
(Czech Republic) S Kleinová | 1 | 1
(Romania) I Spîrlea | 4 | 6 | 3
(Belarus) O Barabanschikova | 6 | 3 | 6
(Bulgaria) L Bacheva | 4 | 4
(Austria) S Plischke | 6 | 6
(Argentina) M Díaz Oliva | 3 | 7^{7} | 4
(Croatia) J Kostanić | 6 | 6^{3} | 6
(United States) E deLone | 6 | 6
(Hungary) A-M Földényi | 1 | 4
(Romania) R Dragomir | 7 | 6
Q | (Italy) T Garbin | 5 | 4
(Spain) G León García | 3 | 3
(Puerto Rico) K Brandi | 6 | 6
(Russia) T Panova | 3 | 3
8 | (South Africa) A Coetzer | 6 | 6

Second round
10 | (Spain) C Martínez | 6 | 4 | 6
(Belarus) O Barabanschikova | 3 | 6 | 3
(Austria) S Plischke | 3 | 6 | 4
(Croatia) J Kostanić | 6 | 0 | 6
(United States) E deLone | 4 | 7 | 0
(Romania) R Dragomir | 6 | 5 | 6
(Puerto Rico) K Brandi | 6 | 6
8 | (South Africa) A Coetzer | 1 | 3

Third round
10 | (Spain) C Martínez | 6 | 6
(Croatia) J Kostanić | 4 | 4
(Romania) R Dragomir | 4 | 6^{7}
(Puerto Rico) K Brandi | 6 | 7^{9}

Fourth round
10 | (Spain) C Martínez | 6 | 6
(Puerto Rico) K Brandi | 1 | 1

=== Bottom half ===
==== Section 5 ====
First round
7 | (France) A Mauresmo | 6 | 6
(Spain) C Torrens Valero | 1 | 2
(Switzerland) P Schnyder | 6 | 6
(United States) L Osterloh | 3 | 4
(Russia) N Petrova | 6 | 6
(France) A-G Sidot | 4 | 2
(Czech Republic) L Němečková | 4 | 6^{4}
(Zimbabwe) C Black | 6 | 7^{7}
Q | (United Kingdom) J Pullin | 6 | 6
(United States) J Chi | 1 | 3
WC | (China) J-Q Yi | 7^{7} | 6
(Belgium) L Courtois | 6^{5} | 2
(United States) J Capriati | 6 | 7^{7}
(Austria) B Schwartz | 1 | 6^{1}
(Belgium) K Clijsters | 6 | 1 | 1
14 | (Belgium) D Van Roost | 3 | 6 | 6

Second round
7 | (France) A Mauresmo | 4 | 4
(Switzerland) P Schnyder | 6 | 6
(Russia) N Petrova | 4 | 6 | 6
(Zimbabwe) C Black | 6 | 4 | 4
Q | (United Kingdom) J Pullin | 3 | 6 | 7
WC | (China) J-Q Yi | 6 | 2 | 9
(United States) J Capriati | 6 | 4 | 8
14 | (Belgium) D Van Roost | 1 | 6 | 6

Third round
(Switzerland) P Schnyder | 7^{8} | 4 | 6
(Russia) N Petrova | 6^{6} | 6 | 2
WC | (China) J-Q Yi | 4 | 4
(United States) J Capriati | 6 | 6

Fourth round
(Switzerland) P Schnyder | 3 | 6 | 1
(United States) J Capriati | 6 | 4 | 6

==== Section 6 ====
First round
15 | (Germany) A Huber | 4 | 4
(Netherlands) K Boogert | 6 | 6
(United States) A Stevenson | 6^{6} | 3
(Sweden) Å Carlsson | 7^{8} | 6
(Japan) A Sugiyama | 7^{7} | 7^{7}
(Bulgaria) M Maleeva | 6^{3} | 6^{4}
(Netherlands) S Noorlander | 6 | 3 | 3
(Czech Republic) A Gerši | 3 | 6 | 6
(Netherlands) M Oremans | 6 | 6
(Germany) A Barna | 2 | 2
(United States) J Lee | 4 | 7^{8} | 5
(Federal Republic of Yugoslavia) S Načuk | 6 | 6^{6} | 7
(France) A Cocheteux | 1 | 7 | 6
(Germany) B Rittner | 6 | 5 | 4
Q | (United States) L Wild | 5 | 3
4 | (France) M Pierce | 7 | 6

Second round
(Netherlands) K Boogert | 5 | 3
(Sweden) Å Carlsson | 7 | 6
(Japan) A Sugiyama | 6 | 6
(Czech Republic) A Gerši | 1 | 4
(Netherlands) M Oremans | 6 | 7
(Federal Republic of Yugoslavia) S Načuk | 3 | 5
(France) A Cocheteux | 2 | 2
4 | (France) M Pierce | 6 | 6

Third round
(Sweden) Å Carlsson | 4 | 6 | 3
(Japan) A Sugiyama | 6 | 4 | 6
(Netherlands) M Oremans | 2 | 4
4 | (France) M Pierce | 6 | 6

Fourth round
(Japan) A Sugiyama | 7 | 6
4 | (France) M Pierce | 5 | 4

==== Section 7 ====
First round
5 | (France) N Tauziat | 6 | 2 | 6
(Slovakia) H Nagyová | 1 | 6 | 1
Q | (Canada) S Jeyaseelan | 6 | 3 | 6
(Netherlands) A Hopmans | 2 | 6 | 1
Q | (Germany) J Kandarr | 6 | 6^{5} | 8
WC | (Australia) M Dowse | 4 | 7^{7} | 6
WC | (Australia) E Dominikovic | 7^{7} | 4 | 2
(France) É Loit | 6^{3} | 6 | 6
WC | (Australia) R McQuillan | 4 | 3
(Spain) Á Montolio | 6 | 6
(Argentina) P Suárez | 0 | 6 | 6
(Russia) E Dementieva | 6 | 3 | 8
(France) N Dechy | 1 | 6 | 1
(Colombia) F Zuluaga | 6 | 3 | 6
Q | (Russia) L Krasnoroutskaya | 2 | 4
9 | (France) J Halard-Decugis | 6 | 6

Second round
5 | (France) N Tauziat | 6^{3} | 4
Q | (Canada) S Jeyaseelan | 7^{7} | 6
Q | (Germany) J Kandarr | 1 | 7 | 6
(France) É Loit | 6 | 5 | 3
(Spain) Á Montolio | 4 | 3
(Russia) E Dementieva | 6 | 6
(Colombia) F Zuluaga | 3 | 3
9 | (France) J Halard-Decugis | 6 | 6

Third round
Q | (Canada) S Jeyaseelan | 2 | 6 | 3
Q | (Germany) J Kandarr | 6 | 0 | 6
(Russia) E Dementieva | 6 | 4 | 2
9 | (France) J Halard-Decugis | 3 | 6 | 6

Fourth round
Q | (Germany) J Kandarr | 1 | 0 | r
9 | (France) J Halard-Decugis | 6 | 3

==== Section 8 ====
First round
11 | (Russia) A Kournikova | 6 | 6
(Austria) P Wartusch | 0 | 0
(United States) B Rippner | 7^{7} | 5 | 2
(Belarus) N Zvereva | 6^{4} | 7 | 6
(Czech Republic) K Hrdličková | 6 | 6
(Spain) V Ruano Pascual | 2 | 1
(Hungary) R Kuti-Kis | 6 | 2 | 6
(Australia) J Dokić | 1 | 6 | 3
Q | (Russia) A Jidkova | 2 | 7^{7} | 6
(Slovenia) T Pisnik | 6 | 6^{5} | 1
(Germany) M Weingärtner | 6 | 2 | 6
(Luxembourg) A Kremer | 2 | 6 | 4
(United States) C Morariu | 6 | 5 | 3
Q | (United States) M Irvin | 2 | 7 | 6
(France) S Pitkowski | 3 | 1
2 | (United States) L Davenport | 6 | 6

Second round
11 | (Russia) A Kournikova | 6 | 6
(Belarus) N Zvereva | 1 | 4
(Czech Republic) K Hrdličková | 7^{7} | 6^{5} | 6
(Hungary) R Kuti-Kis | 6^{2} | 7^{7} | 3
Q | (Russia) A Jidkova | 7 | 6
(Germany) M Weingärtner | 5 | 3
Q | (United States) M Irvin | 4 | 5
2 | (United States) L Davenport | 6 | 7

Third round
11 | (Russia) A Kournikova | 2 | 6 | 6
(Czech Republic) K Hrdličková | 6 | 3 | 4
Q | (Russia) A Jidkova | 0 | 1
2 | (United States) L Davenport | 6 | 6

Fourth round
11 | (Russia) A Kournikova | 4 | 3
2 | (United States) L Davenport | 6 | 6

== Singles overview ==
Women's singles

| Champion | | Runner-up | |
|---|---|---|---|
| (United States) Lindsay Davenport (2) | | (Switzerland) Martina Hingis (1) | |
Semifinals out
| (Spain) Conchita Martínez (10) | | (United States) Jennifer Capriati | |
Quarterfinals out
| (Spain) Arantxa Sánchez Vicario (13) | (Russia) Elena Likhovtseva (16) | (Japan) Ai Sugiyama | (France) Julie Halard-Decugis (9) |
4th round out
| (France) Sandrine Testud (12) | (Austria) Barbara Schett (6) | (United States) Serena Williams (3) | (Puerto Rico) Kristina Brandi |
| (Switzerland) Patty Schnyder | (France) Mary Pierce (4) | (Germany) Jana Kandarr | (Russia) Anna Kournikova (11) |
3rd round out
| (Australia) Alicia Molik | (Thailand) Tamarine Tanasugarn | (Australia) Bryanne Stewart | (Argentina) Florencia Labat |
| (Belgium) Sabine Appelmans | (Belgium) Els Callens | (Croatia) Jelena Kostanić | (Romania) Ruxandra Dragomir |
| (Russia) Nadia Petrova | (China) Yi Jing-Qian | (Sweden) Åsa Carlsson | (Netherlands) Miriam Oremans |
| (Canada) Sonya Jeyaseelan | (Russia) Elena Dementieva | (Czech Republic) Květa Hrdličková | (Russia) Alina Jidkova |
2nd round out
| (Belgium) Justine Henin | (Slovakia) Karina Habšudová | (Canada) Jana Nejedly | (Mexico) Angélica Gavaldón |
| (United States) Lisa Raymond | (Switzerland) Emmanuelle Gagliardi | (Spain) Magüi Serna | (Switzerland) Miroslava Vavrinec |
| (Australia) Nicole Pratt | (United States) Chanda Rubin | (Czech Republic) Denisa Chládková | (United States) Meghann Shaughnessy |
| (Belarus) Olga Barabanschikova | (Austria) Sylvia Plischke | (Netherlands) Erika deLone | (South Africa) Amanda Coetzer (8) |
| (France) Amélie Mauresmo (7) | (Zimbabwe) Cara Black | (United Kingdom) Julie Pullin | (Belgium) Dominique Van Roost (14) |
| (Netherlands) Kristie Boogert | (Czech Republic) Adriana Gerši | (Serbia and Montenegro) Sandra Načuk | (France) Amélie Cocheteux |
| (France) Nathalie Tauziat (5) | (France) Émilie Loit | (Spain) Ángeles Montolio | (Colombia) Fabiola Zuluaga |
| (Belarus) Natasha Zvereva | (Hungary) Rita Kuti-Kis | (Germany) Marlene Weingärtner | (United States) Marissa Irvin |
1st round out
| (Croatia) Mirjana Lučić | (Australia) Kerry-Anne Guse | (United States) Jolene Watanabe | (Croatia) Silvija Talaja |
| (Italy) Rita Grande | (Slovenia) Katarina Srebotnik | (Israel) Tzipora Obziler | (Hungary) Petra Mandula |
| (Germany) Julia Abe | (France) Alexandra Fusai | (France) Alexia Dechaume-Balleret | (Venezuela) María Vento-Kabchi |
| (Slovakia) Ľudmila Cervanová | (Canada) Maureen Drake | (Australia) Lisa McShea | (United States) Meilen Tu |
| (Australia) Amanda Grahame | (Spain) María Sánchez Lorenzo | (Australia) Annabel Ellwood | (Israel) Anna Smashnova |
| (United States) Amy Frazier | (France) Virginie Razzano | (United States) Tara Snyder | (Bulgaria) Pavlina Nola |
| (Czech Republic) Sandra Kleinová | (Romania) Irina Spîrlea | (Bulgaria) Lubomira Bacheva | (Argentina) Mariana Díaz Oliva |
| (Hungary) Anna Földényi | (Italy) Tathiana Garbin | (Spain) Gala León García | (Russia) Tatiana Panova |
| (Spain) Cristina Torrens Valero | (United States) Lilia Osterloh | (France) Anne-Gaëlle Sidot | (Czech Republic) Lenka Němečková |
| (United States) Jane Chi | (Belgium) Laurence Courtois | (Austria) Barbara Schwartz | (Belgium) Kim Clijsters |
| (Germany) Anke Huber (15) | (United States) Alexandra Stevenson | (Bulgaria) Magdalena Maleeva | (Netherlands) Seda Noorlander |
| (Romania) Anca Barna | (Chinese Taipei) Janet Lee | (Germany) Barbara Rittner | (United States) Linda Wild |
| (Slovakia) Henrieta Nagyová | (Netherlands) Amanda Hopmans | (Australia) Melissa Dowse | (Australia) Evie Dominikovic |
| (Australia) Rachel McQuillan | (Argentina) Paola Suárez | (France) Nathalie Dechy | (Russia) Lina Krasnoroutskaya |
| (Austria) Patricia Wartusch | (United States) Brie Rippner | (Spain) Virginia Ruano Pascual | (Serbia and Montenegro) Jelena Dokić |
| (Slovenia) Tina Pisnik | (Luxembourg) Anne Kremer | (United States) Corina Morariu | (France) Sarah Pitkowski |

| Preceded by 1999 US Open – Women's singles | Grand Slam women's singles | Succeeded by 2000 French Open – Women's singles |
