= 2000 Australian Open – Men's singles =

Men's singles
- 2000 Australian Open

Final
- Champion: (United States) Andre Agassi
- Runner-up: (Russia) Yevgeny Kafelnikov
- Score: 3–6, 6–3, 6–2, 6–4

Details
- Draw: 128
- Seeds: 16

Events
Singles	men	women		boys	girls
Doubles	men	women	mixed	boys	girls
WC Singles	men	women	quad
WC Doubles	men	women	quad
Legends	men	women	mixed
- Australian Open

Andre Agassi defeated defending champion Yevgeny Kafelnikov in the final, 3–6, 6–3, 6–2, 6–4 to win the men's singles tennis title at the 2000 Australian Open. It was his second Australian Open title and sixth major title overall. It was also Agassi's fourth consecutive major final, making him the first man to reach all four major finals consecutively since Rod Laver in 1969. With the win, Agassi became the reigning champion at three of the four majors, missing only the 1999 Wimbledon Championships.

This was the first Australian Open for future six-time champion and world No. 1 Roger Federer, and marked his first match win at a major. Also, this marked the beginning of Federer's 65-consecutive major appearance streak and his 21-consecutive Australian Open appearance streak.

This tournament marked the final major appearance of former world No. 1, two-time Australian Open and four-time major champion Jim Courier; he lost to Nicolas Escudé in the first round.

== Seeds ==
1. (United States) Andre Agassi (champion)
2. (Russia) Yevgeny Kafelnikov (final)
3. (United States) Pete Sampras (semifinals)
4. (Germany) Nicolas Kiefer (quarterfinals)
5. (Brazil) Gustavo Kuerten (first round)
6. (Sweden) Thomas Enqvist (first round)
7. (Ecuador) Nicolás Lapentti (second round)
8. (United States) Todd Martin (second round)
9. (Netherlands) Richard Krajicek (second round)
10. (Germany) Tommy Haas (second round)
11. (United Kingdom) Tim Henman (fourth round)
12. (Sweden) Magnus Norman (semifinals)
13. (France) Cédric Pioline (first round)
14. (Slovakia) Karol Kučera (first round)
15. (Spain) Albert Costa (first round)
16. (Australia) Mark Philippoussis (fourth round)

== Draw ==
Key

- Q = Qualifier
- WC = Wild card
- LL = Lucky loser
- Alt = Alternate
- ITF = ITF entry
- PR = Protected ranking
- SR = Special ranking
- SE = Special exempt
- JE = Junior exempt
- JR = Junior Accelerator Programme entrant
- CO = College Accelerator Programme entrant
- NG = Next Gen Accelerator Program entrant
- w/o = Walkover
- r = Retired
- d = Defaulted

=== Finals ===
Quarterfinals
1	(United States) Andre Agassi	6	6	6
(Morocco) Hicham Arazi	4	4	2
3	(United States) Pete Sampras	7	6	6
(United States) Chris Woodruff	5	3	3
12	(Sweden) Magnus Norman	3	6	6	7^{7}
4	(Germany) Nicolas Kiefer	6	3	1	6^{4}
(Morocco) Younes El Aynaoui	0	3	6^{4}
2	(Russia) Yevgeny Kafelnikov	6	6	7^{7}

Semifinals
1	(United States) Andre Agassi	6	3	6^{0}	7^{7}	6
3	(United States) Pete Sampras	4	6	7^{7}	6^{5}	1
12	(Sweden) Magnus Norman	1	2	4
2	(Russia) Yevgeny Kafelnikov	6	6	6

Final
1	(United States) Andre Agassi	3	6	6	6
2	(Russia) Yevgeny Kafelnikov	6	3	2	4

=== Top half ===
==== Section 1 ====
First round
1	(United States) A Agassi	6	6	6
(Argentina) M Puerta	2	2	3
(Netherlands) S Schalken	7^{10}	6	7^{7}
(Spain) G Blanco	6^{8}	4	6^{2}
(Spain) F Mantilla	1	7	3	6^{5}
(Argentina) M Zabaleta	6	5	6	7^{7}
(Netherlands) J Siemerink	4	1	3
WC	(Australia) T Woodbridge	6	6	6
(Australia) A Ilie	6	7^{7}	4	6
(United States) J Tarango	3	6^{4}	6	3
(Czech Republic) J Novák	6	4	6	5	6
(Austria) M Hipfl	3	6	3	7	2
Q	(Netherlands) R Sluiter	3	6	3	6	13
(Italy) A Gaudenzi	6	1	6	3	11
Q	(Israel) N Okun	4	2	6	6	2
16	(Australia) M Philippoussis	6	6	2	3	6

Second round
1	(United States) A Agassi	7	6	6
(Netherlands) S Schalken	5	0	3
(Argentina) M Zabaleta	7^{8}	4	6	6
WC	(Australia) T Woodbridge	6^{6}	6	1	4
(Australia) A Ilie	6	7^{7}	6^{4}	6
(Czech Republic) J Novák	3	6^{5}	7^{7}	4
Q	(Netherlands) R Sluiter	1	6	6^{4}	1
16	(Australia) M Philippoussis	6	2	7^{7}	6

Third round
1	(United States) A Agassi	6	6	6
(Argentina) M Zabaleta	4	4	2
(Australia) A Ilie	4	6^{4}	1
16	(Australia) M Philippoussis	6	7^{7}	6

Fourth round
1	(United States) A Agassi	6	7^{7}	5	6
16	(Australia) M Philippoussis	4	6^{4}	7	3

==== Section 2 ====
First round
9	(Netherlands) R Krajicek	6	6	7
(France) F Santoro	1	2	5
(France) N Escudé	6^{4}	6	7	6
(United States) J Courier	7^{7}	3	5	1
WC	(Australia) D Petrović	2	6	6^{5}	4
Q	(India) L Paes	6	3	7^{7}	6
(Argentina) H Gumy	6^{2}	1	1
(Sweden) A Vinciguerra	7^{7}	6	6
(Spain) J Díaz	6	6	2	5	3
Q	(Sweden) F Jonsson	4	4	6	7	6
(Spain) J Alonso	3	6^{6}	2
(Morocco) H Arazi	6	7^{8}	6
(Spain) F Vicente	6	6	6
(Spain) A Berasategui	0	2	2
(Zimbabwe) B Black	7	7^{7}	4	2	6
8	(United States) T Martin	5	6^{4}	6	6	8

Second round
9	(Netherlands) R Krajicek	6	3	1	3
(France) N Escudé	2	6	6	6
Q	(India) L Paes	6^{3}	4	3
(Sweden) A Vinciguerra	7^{7}	6	6
Q	(Sweden) F Jonsson	3	4	4
(Morocco) H Arazi	6	6	6
(Spain) F Vicente	6	2	3	6	7
8	(United States) T Martin	4	6	6	3	5

Third round
(France) N Escudé	6	6	6
(Sweden) A Vinciguerra	4	4	3
(Morocco) H Arazi	6	6	6
(Spain) F Vicente	3	3	2

Fourth round
(France) N Escudé	4	3	6^{7}
(Morocco) H Arazi	6	6	7^{9}

==== Section 3 ====
First round
3	(United States) P Sampras	6	7	6
(Australia) W Arthurs	4	5	4
(Canada) S Lareau	6	4	2	1
(Sweden) M Tillström	4	6	6	6
(Switzerland) M Rosset	7^{7}	6	7^{7}
LL	(United Kingdom) J Delgado	6^{0}	3	6^{3}
(United States) J-M Gambill	6^{3}	1	4
Q	(Zimbabwe) W Black	7^{7}	6	6
WC	(Australia) J Sirianni	3	2	1
(Argentina) F Squillari	6	6	6
WC	(Australia) M Woodforde	6	6	7^{7}
Q	(Italy) D Sanguinetti	3	4	6^{4}
Q	(France) J Boutter	6^{4}	7	3	5
(Czech Republic) C Doseděl	7^{7}	5	6	7
(Thailand) P Srichaphan	6	6	3	6
14	(Slovakia) K Kučera	2	4	6	3

Second round
3	(United States) P Sampras	6	7^{8}	6
(Sweden) M Tillström	3	6^{6}	1
(Switzerland) M Rosset	1	6	6^{1}	3
Q	(Zimbabwe) W Black	6	2	7^{7}	6
(Argentina) F Squillari	6	7^{7}	3	6
WC	(Australia) M Woodforde	4	6^{3}	6	4
(Czech Republic) C Doseděl	4	6	6	6
(Thailand) P Srichaphan	6	2	4	1

Third round
3	(United States) P Sampras	6^{9}	3	6	7	6
Q	(Zimbabwe) W Black	7^{11}	6	3	5	3
(Argentina) F Squillari	5	2	3
(Czech Republic) C Doseděl	7	6	6

Fourth round
3	(United States) P Sampras	6	6	3	6
(Czech Republic) C Doseděl	1	2	6	1

==== Section 4 ====
First round
11	(United Kingdom) T Henman	6^{3}	6	7^{7}	7^{9}
(France) J Golmard	7^{7}	3	6^{4}	6^{7}
(Germany) R Schüttler	6	6	6
(Costa Rica) JA Marín	3	3	3
(Germany) B Karbacher	4	2	2
WC	(Australia) M Hill	6	6	6
(France) S Grosjean	6	6	6
WC	(Japan) G Motomura	3	3	2
(Croatia) I Ljubičić	6^{5}	6	6	5	0
WC	(Australia) J Sekulov	7^{7}	4	4	7	6
(Czech Republic) M Damm	3	6^{3}	3
(United States) C Woodruff	6	7^{7}	6
(Germany) A Pretzsch	7^{7}	6	6
Q	(United States) A O'Brien	6^{1}	2	1
(Australia) R Fromberg	6	7^{7}	4	3	10
6	(Sweden) T Enqvist	4	6^{4}	6	6	8

Second round
11	(United Kingdom) T Henman	6	4
(Germany) R Schüttler	2	1	r
WC	(Australia) M Hill	6	1	6^{3}	0
(France) S Grosjean	4	6	7^{7}	6
WC	(Australia) J Sekulov	3	2	2
(United States) C Woodruff	6	6	6
(Germany) A Pretzsch	6^{6}	6^{6}	4
(Australia) R Fromberg	7^{8}	7^{8}	6

Third round
11	(United Kingdom) T Henman	6	6	4	7^{8}
(France) S Grosjean	1	4	6	6^{6}
(United States) C Woodruff	6	6	7^{8}
(Australia) R Fromberg	1	4	6^{6}

Fourth round
11	(United Kingdom) T Henman	5	6	4	6	5
(United States) C Woodruff	7	1	6	3	7

=== Bottom half ===
==== Section 5 ====
First round
5	(Brazil) G Kuerten	6	6	4	6^{8}	4
(Spain) A Portas	4	4	6	7^{10}	6
(Romania) A Voinea	7^{7}	4	4	6	6
(United States) V Spadea	6^{1}	6	6	3	2
(Australia) L Hewitt	6	6^{5}	7^{7}	6
(United States) P Goldstein	2	7^{7}	6^{5}	4
(Spain) À Corretja	7^{7}	6	6
(Armenia) S Sargsian	6^{5}	4	4
(Australia) J Stoltenberg	7^{8}	4	4	6	4
(Sweden) J Björkman	6^{6}	6	6	0	6
(Netherlands) P Wessels	4	3	6	6^{5}
Q	(Czech Republic) J Vaněk	6	6	2	7^{7}
(Czech Republic) T Zíb	3	6^{7}	7^{7}	1
(Italy) G Pozzi	6	7^{9}	6^{5}	6
(Philippines) C Mamiit	5	4	6	3
12	(Sweden) M Norman	7	6	3	6

Second round
(Spain) A Portas	2	1	3
(Romania) A Voinea	6	6	6
(Australia) L Hewitt	6	6	6
(Spain) À Corretja	0	0	1
(Sweden) J Björkman	6	3	6	7^{7}
Q	(Czech Republic) J Vaněk	4	6	4	6^{4}
(Italy) G Pozzi	4	3	4
12	(Sweden) M Norman	6	6	6

Third round
(Romania) A Voinea	2	5	3
(Australia) L Hewitt	6	7	6
(Sweden) J Björkman	4	4	6^{8}
12	(Sweden) M Norman	6	6	7^{10}

Fourth round
(Australia) L Hewitt	3	1	6^{6}
12	(Sweden) M Norman	6	6	7^{8}

==== Section 6 ====
First round
13	(France) C Pioline	4	6	5	6	7
(Croatia) G Ivanišević	6	2	7	1	9
(Spain) F Clavet	3	6	6	7^{7}
(Slovakia) D Hrbatý	6	1	4	6^{3}
(South Africa) W Ferreira	6	6	4	7^{7}
(Switzerland) G Bastl	3	3	6	6^{2}
(Sweden) T Johansson	6	6	6
(Sweden) N Kulti	1	2	4
(Argentina) G Gaudio	3	3	2
Q	(France) M Llodra	6	6	6
(Switzerland) L Manta	4	6^{5}	5
(Morocco) K Alami	6	7^{7}	7
(Brazil) F Meligeni	2	6	7^{7}	3	0
(Germany) T Behrend	6	4	6^{5}	6	6
(Argentina) G Cañas	6	3	4	4
4	(Germany) N Kiefer	4	6	6	6

Second round
(Croatia) G Ivanišević	6^{5}	4	2
(Spain) F Clavet	7^{7}	6	6
(South Africa) W Ferreira	6	6	6^{2}	4	6
(Sweden) T Johansson	3	2	7^{7}	6	2
Q	(France) M Llodra	6^{4}	3	2
(Morocco) K Alami	7^{7}	6	6
(Germany) T Behrend	6^{5}	0	2
4	(Germany) N Kiefer	7^{7}	6	6

Third round
(Spain) F Clavet	3	4	6	3
(South Africa) W Ferreira	6	6	3	6
(Morocco) K Alami	3	4	2
4	(Germany) N Kiefer	6	6	6

Fourth round
(South Africa) W Ferreira	3	4	2
4	(Germany) N Kiefer	6	6	6

==== Section 7 ====
First round
7	(Ecuador) N Lapentti	6	5	6^{2}	6	8
(Ukraine) A Medvedev	3	7	7^{7}	4	6
(Netherlands) J van Lottum	6^{2}	4	r
(France) A Clément	7^{7}	6
(Slovakia) J Krošlák	6	3	6	7
(Spain) Á López Morón	1	6	3	5
(United States) M Chang	4	4	6^{5}
(Switzerland) R Federer	6	6	7^{7}
WC	(Australia) S Draper	6^{3}	3	6^{3}
(Spain) JC Ferrero	7^{7}	6	7^{7}
(Italy) L Tieleman	6	7^{7}	6^{3}	6
(Spain) A Martín	2	6^{3}	7^{7}	3
Q	(United Kingdom) A Parmar	7^{10}	6^{5}	6	3	1
(Morocco) Y El Aynaoui	6^{8}	7^{7}	1	6	6
Q	(France) C Saulnier	6^{2}	4	6	2
10	(Germany) T Haas	7^{7}	6	4	6

Second round
7	(Ecuador) N Lapentti	6	6^{3}	2	1	r
(France) A Clément	3	7^{7}	6	4
(Slovakia) J Krošlák	6^{1}	2	3
(Switzerland) R Federer	7^{7}	6	6
(Spain) JC Ferrero	7^{7}	6	5	6^{5}	6
(Italy) L Tieleman	6^{5}	4	7	7^{7}	4
(Morocco) Y El Aynaoui	7	6	6
10	(Germany) T Haas	5	3	3

Third round
(France) A Clément	6	6	6
(Switzerland) R Federer	1	4	3
(Spain) JC Ferrero	6^{3}	6	6	6^{5}	4
(Morocco) Y El Aynaoui	7^{7}	4	4	7^{7}	6

Fourth round
(France) A Clément	6	3	4	6	8
(Morocco) Y El Aynaoui	3	6	6	3	10

==== Section 8 ====
First round
15	(Spain) A Costa	3	7^{10}	4	3
Q	(Belgium) C Rochus	6	6^{8}	6	6
LL	(Czech Republic) M Tabara	1	6^{6}	6	1
Q	(Zimbabwe) K Ullyett	6	7^{8}	4	6
(France) A Dupuis	6	6	7^{7}
(Argentina) M Rodríguez	4	4	6^{4}
(Belarus) M Mirnyi	6^{5}	7^{7}	6	6
(Haiti) R Agénor	7^{7}	6^{5}	3	3
Q	(France) R Cadart	3	7	2	4
(Austria) S Koubek	6	5	6	6
Q	(South Africa) G Stafford	7^{7}	6	6
(Russia) M Safin	6^{4}	4	1
(Czech Republic) D Vacek	1	7^{7}	7^{13}	6
(Bulgaria) O Stanoytchev	6	6^{4}	6^{11}	2
(Germany) J Knippschild	7^{7}	4	1	2
2	(Russia) Y Kafelnikov	6^{4}	6	6	6

Second round
Q	(Belgium) C Rochus	6	6	6
Q	(Zimbabwe) K Ullyett	4	4	3
(France) A Dupuis	7^{7}	6^{6}	6^{5}	6^{5}
(Belarus) M Mirnyi	6^{3}	7^{8}	7^{7}	7^{7}
(Austria) S Koubek	5	7	2	6	6
Q	(South Africa) G Stafford	7	5	6	2	3
(Czech Republic) D Vacek	3	0	1
2	(Russia) Y Kafelnikov	6	6	6

Third round
Q	(Belgium) C Rochus	3	6	6	7^{7}
(Belarus) M Mirnyi	6	4	3	6^{2}
(Austria) S Koubek	3	3	4
2	(Russia) Y Kafelnikov	6	6	6

Fourth round
Q	(Belgium) C Rochus	1	3	5
2	(Russia) Y Kafelnikov	6	6	7

== Singles overview ==
Men's singles

Champion		Runner-up	
(United States) Andre Agassi (1)		(Russia) Yevgeny Kafelnikov (2)	
Semifinals out
(United States) Pete Sampras (3)		(Sweden) Magnus Norman (12)	
Quarterfinals out
(Morocco) Hicham Arazi	(United States) Chris Woodruff	(Germany) Nicolas Kiefer (4)	(Morocco) Younes El Aynaoui
4th round out
(Australia) Mark Philippoussis (16)	(France) Nicolas Escudé	(Czech Republic) Ctislav Doseděl	(United Kingdom) Tim Henman (11)
(Australia) Lleyton Hewitt	(South Africa) Wayne Ferreira	(France) Arnaud Clément	(Belgium) Christophe Rochus
3rd round out
(Argentina) Mariano Zabaleta	(Australia) Andrew Ilie	(Sweden) Andreas Vinciguerra	(Spain) Fernando Vicente
(Zimbabwe) Wayne Black	(Argentina) Franco Squillari	(France) Sébastien Grosjean	(Australia) Richard Fromberg
(Romania) Adrian Voinea	(Sweden) Jonas Björkman	(Spain) Francisco Clavet	(Morocco) Karim Alami
(Switzerland) Roger Federer	(Spain) Juan Carlos Ferrero	(Belarus) Max Mirnyi	(Austria) Stefan Koubek
2nd round out
(Netherlands) Sjeng Schalken	(Australia) Todd Woodbridge	(Czech Republic) Jiří Novák	(Netherlands) Raemon Sluiter
(Netherlands) Richard Krajicek (9)	(India) Leander Paes	(Sweden) Fredrik Jonsson	(United States) Todd Martin (8)
(Sweden) Mikael Tillström	(Switzerland) Marc Rosset	(Australia) Mark Woodforde	(Thailand) Paradorn Srichaphan
(Germany) Rainer Schüttler	(Australia) Michael Hill	(Australia) James Sekulov	(Germany) Axel Pretzsch
(Spain) Albert Portas	(Spain) Àlex Corretja	(Czech Republic) Jiří Vaněk	(Italy) Gianluca Pozzi
(Croatia) Goran Ivanišević	(Sweden) Thomas Johansson	(France) Michaël Llodra	(Czech Republic) Tomas Behrend
(Ecuador) Nicolás Lapentti (7)	(Slovakia) Ján Krošlák	(Italy) Laurence Tieleman	(Germany) Tommy Haas (10)
(Zimbabwe) Kevin Ullyett	(France) Antony Dupuis	(South Africa) Grant Stafford	(Czech Republic) Daniel Vacek
1st round out
(Argentina) Mariano Puerta	(Spain) Galo Blanco	(Spain) Félix Mantilla	(Netherlands) Jan Siemerink
(United States) Jeff Tarango	(Austria) Markus Hipfl	(Italy) Andrea Gaudenzi	(Israel) Noam Okun
(France) Fabrice Santoro	(United States) Jim Courier	(Australia) Dejan Petrovic	(Argentina) Hernán Gumy
(Spain) Jacobo Díaz	(Spain) Julian Alonso	(Spain) Alberto Berasategui	(Zimbabwe) Byron Black
(Australia) Wayne Arthurs	(Canada) Sébastien Lareau	(United Kingdom) Jamie Delgado	(United States) Jan-Michael Gambill
(Australia) Joseph Sirianni	(Italy) Davide Sanguinetti	(France) Julien Boutter	(Slovakia) Karol Kučera (14)
(France) Jérôme Golmard	(Costa Rica) Juan Antonio Marín	(Germany) Bernd Karbacher	(Japan) Gouichi Motomura
(Croatia) Ivan Ljubičić	(Czech Republic) Martin Damm	(United States) Alex O'Brien	(Sweden) Thomas Enqvist (6)
(Brazil) Gustavo Kuerten (5)	(United States) Vincent Spadea	(United States) Paul Goldstein	(Armenia) Sargis Sargsian
(Australia) Jason Stoltenberg	(Netherlands) Peter Wessels	(Czech Republic) Tomáš Zíb	(Philippines) Cecil Mamiit
(France) Cédric Pioline (13)	(Slovakia) Dominik Hrbatý	(Switzerland) George Bastl	(Sweden) Nicklas Kulti
(Argentina) Gastón Gaudio	(Switzerland) Lorenzo Manta	(Brazil) Fernando Meligeni	(Argentina) Guillermo Cañas
(Ukraine) Andrei Medvedev	(Netherlands) John van Lottum	(Spain) Álex López Morón	(United States) Michael Chang
(Australia) Scott Draper	(Spain) Alberto Martín	(United Kingdom) Arvind Parmar	(France) Cyril Saulnier
(Spain) Albert Costa (15)	(Czech Republic) Michal Tabara	(Argentina) Martín Rodríguez	(Haiti) Ronald Agénor
(France) Rodolphe Cadart	(Russia) Marat Safin	(Bulgaria) Orlin Stanoytchev	(Germany) Jens Knippschild

Preceded by 1999 US Open – Men's singles	Grand Slam men's singles	Succeeded by 2000 French Open – Men's singles
