= 2000 Australian Open – Mixed doubles =

Mixed doubles
- 2000 Australian Open

Final
- Champions: (Australia) Rennae Stubbs (United States) Jared Palmer
- Runners-up: (Spain) Arantxa Sánchez Vicario (Australia) Todd Woodbridge
- Score: 7–5, 7–6^{(7–3)}

Details
- Draw: 32
- Seeds: 8

Events
Singles	men	women		boys	girls
Doubles	men	women	mixed	boys	girls
WC Singles	men	women	quad
WC Doubles	men	women	quad
Legends	men	women	mixed
- Australian Open

Rennae Stubbs and Jared Palmer defeated 1993 champions Arantxa Sánchez Vicario and Todd Woodbridge in the final, 7–5, 7–6^{(7–3)}, to win the mixed doubles tennis title at the 2000 Australian Open. By winning the title, Stubbs won her second Grand Slam title, after she won her first in women's doubles earlier in the week, and Palmer won his first major mixed doubles title. Mariaan de Swardt and David Adams were the defending champions, but De Swardt chose not to defend her title and Adams played with Kristie Boogert. Adams and Boogert lost to Sánchez Vicario and Woodbridge in the semifinals.

== Seeds ==
Champion seeds are indicated in bold text while text in italics indicates the round in which those seeds were eliminated.

1. (Russia) Anna Kournikova / (Sweden) Jonas Björkman (semifinals)
2. (United States) Lisa Raymond / (India) Leander Paes (first round)
3. **(Australia) Rennae Stubbs / (United States) Jared Palmer (champions)**
4. (Spain) Arantxa Sánchez Vicario / (Australia) Todd Woodbridge (final)
5. (Belarus) Natasha Zvereva / (Australia) Mark Woodforde (quarterfinals)
6. (Russia) Elena Likhovtseva / (United States) Jeff Tarango (quarterfinals)
7. (Netherlands) Caroline Vis / (South Africa) John-Laffnie de Jager (second round)
8. (Ukraine) Elena Tatarkova / (Russia) Andrei Olhovskiy (quarterfinals)

== Draw ==
Key

- Q = Qualifier
- WC = Wild card
- LL = Lucky loser
- Alt = Alternate
- ITF = ITF entry
- PR = Protected ranking
- SR = Special ranking
- SE = Special exempt
- JE = Junior exempt
- JR = Junior Accelerator Programme entrant
- CO = College Accelerator Programme entrant
- NG = Next Gen Accelerator Program entrant
- w/o = Walkover
- r = Retired
- d = Defaulted

=== Final ===
Final
3	**(Australia) Rennae Stubbs** **(United States) Jared Palmer**	**7**	**7^{7}**
4	(Spain) Arantxa Sánchez Vicario (Australia) Todd Woodbridge	5	6^{3}

=== Top half ===
First round
1	**(Russia) Anna Kournikova** **(Sweden) Jonas Björkman**	5
(Argentina) Patricia Tarabini (Argentina) Sebastián Prieto	3^{r}
(Australia) Louise Pleming (Australia) Paul Kilderry	3	**7^{16}**	2
**(United States) Corina Morariu** **(Australia) Michael Hill**	**6**	6^{14}	**6**
(Australia) Nicole Pratt (Australia) Andrew Ilie	2	3
**(Zimbabwe) Cara Black** **(South Africa) Robbie Koenig**	**6**	**6**
(Australia) Kristine Kunce (South Africa) Ellis Ferreira	**7^{7}**	3	2
6	**(Russia) Elena Likhovtseva** **(United States) Jeff Tarango**	6^{5}	**6**	**6**
3	**(Australia) Rennae Stubbs** **(United States) Jared Palmer**	3	**6**	**6**
(United States) Nicole Arendt (United States) Jack Waite	**6**	3	2
(France) Émilie Loit (France) Olivier Delaître	0	4
**(Indonesia) Yayuk Basuki** **(Argentina) Daniel Orsanic**	**6**	**6**
(Australia) Jelena Dokic (Australia) Andrew Kratzmann	4	6^{5}
**(Australia) Catherine Barclay** **(Australia) Peter Tramacchi**	**6**	**7^{7}**
(Slovenia) Katarina Srebotnik (South Africa) Piet Norval	4	4
8	**(Ukraine) Elena Tatarkova** **(Russia) Andrei Olhovskiy**	**6**	**6**

Second round
1	**(Russia) Anna Kournikova** **(Sweden) Jonas Björkman**	**6**	4
(United States) Corina Morariu (Australia) Michael Hill	3	1^{r}
(Zimbabwe) Cara Black (South Africa) Robbie Koenig	4	**6**	6^{5}
6	**(Russia) Elena Likhovtseva** **(United States) Jeff Tarango**	**6**	1	**7^{7}**
3	**(Australia) Rennae Stubbs** **(United States) Jared Palmer**	**6**	3	**7^{7}**
(Indonesia) Yayuk Basuki (Argentina) Daniel Orsanic	4	**6**	6^{3}
(Australia) Catherine Barclay (Australia) Peter Tramacchi	3	4
8	**(Ukraine) Elena Tatarkova** **(Russia) Andrei Olhovskiy**	**6**	**6**

Quarterfinals
1	**(Russia) Anna Kournikova** **(Sweden) Jonas Björkman**	**6**	**6**
6	(Russia) Elena Likhovtseva (United States) Jeff Tarango	3	2
3	**(Australia) Rennae Stubbs** **(United States) Jared Palmer**	**7**
8	(Ukraine) Elena Tatarkova (Russia) Andrei Olhovskiy	5^{r}

Semifinals
1	(Russia) Anna Kournikova (Sweden) Jonas Björkman	5	**6**	3
3	**(Australia) Rennae Stubbs** **(United States) Jared Palmer**	**7**	3	**6**

=== Bottom half ===
First round
5	**(Belarus) Natasha Zvereva** **(Australia) Mark Woodforde**	**7^{7}**	**6**
(South Africa) Amanda Coetzer (United States) Rick Leach	6^{2}	3
**(United States) Kimberly Po** **(United States) Donald Johnson**	**6**	4	**6**
(United States) Debbie Graham (Australia) Wayne Arthurs	4	**6**	3
**(Slovakia) Karina Habšudová** **(Australia) David Macpherson**	**7^{9}**	**6**
(Australia) Alicia Molik (Australia) Sandon Stolle	6^{7}	2
(Netherlands) Miriam Oremans (The Bahamas) Mark Knowles	**6**	2	4
4	**(Spain) Arantxa Sánchez** **(Australia) Todd Woodbridge**	4	**6**	**6**
7	**(Netherlands) Caroline Vis** **(South Africa) J-L de Jager**	4	**6**	**6**
(Kazakhstan) Irina Selyutina (Zimbabwe) Wayne Black	**6**	2	4
(Sweden) Åsa Carlsson (Sweden) Peter Nyborg	3	**6**	6^{8}
**(Argentina) Florencia Labat** **(Argentina) Mariano Hood**	**6**	3	**7^{10}**
(Slovenia) Tina Križan (North Macedonia) Aleksandar Kitinov	3	5
**(United States) Katie Schlukebir** **(South Africa) Brent Haygarth**	**6**	**7**
**(Netherlands) Kristie Boogert** **(South Africa) David Adams**	**7^{9}**	**6**
2	(United States) Lisa Raymond (India) Leander Paes	6^{7}	2

Second round
5	**(Belarus) Natasha Zvereva** **(Australia) Mark Woodforde**	**6**	3	**6**
(United States) Kimberly Po (United States) Donald Johnson	4	**6**	3
(Slovakia) Karina Habšudová (Australia) David Macpherson	4	5
4	**(Spain) Arantxa Sánchez** **(Australia) Todd Woodbridge**	**6**	**7**
7	(Netherlands) Caroline Vis (South Africa) J-L de Jager	4	0
**(Argentina) Florencia Labat** **(Argentina) Mariano Hood**	**6**	**6**
(United States) Katie Schlukebir (South Africa) Brent Haygarth	6^{3}	**7^{7}**	0
**(Netherlands) Kristie Boogert** **(South Africa) David Adams**	**7^{7}**	6^{5}	**6**

Quarterfinals
5	(Belarus) Natasha Zvereva (Australia) Mark Woodforde	**6**	5	1
4	**(Spain) Arantxa Sánchez** **(Australia) Todd Woodbridge**	4	**7**	**6**
(Argentina) Florencia Labat (Argentina) Mariano Hood	3	5
**(Netherlands) Kristie Boogert** **(South Africa) David Adams**	**6**	**7**

Semifinals
4	**(Spain) Arantxa Sánchez** **(Australia) Todd Woodbridge**	**6**	**6**
(Netherlands) Kristie Boogert (South Africa) David Adams	3	3
