= 2000 Australian Open =

- Date: 17–30 January 2000
- Edition: 88th
- Category: Grand Slam (ITF)
- Surface: Hardcourt (Rebound Ace)
- Location: Melbourne, Australia
- Venue: Melbourne Park

Champions

Men's singles
- (United States) Andre Agassi

Women's singles
- (United States) Lindsay Davenport

Men's doubles
- (South Africa) Ellis Ferreira / (United States) Rick Leach

Women's doubles
- (United States) Lisa Raymond / (Australia) Rennae Stubbs

Mixed doubles
- (Australia) Rennae Stubbs / (United States) Jared Palmer
- Australian Open

The 2000 Australian Open was a tennis tournament played on outdoor hard courts at Melbourne Park in Melbourne in Australia. It was the 88th edition of the Australian Open and was held from 17 through 30 January 2000.

Both Yevgeny Kafelnikov and Martina Hingis were unsuccessful in their title defences, both being defeated in the final matches by Andre Agassi and Lindsay Davenport, respectively. For Agassi, it was the second of four Australian Open titles, and for Davenport it was her final Grand Slam title.

== Former champions ==
The following are the former Grand Slam champions and finalists in the draw:

- (United States) Andre Agassi ('95 Australian, '99 French, '92 Wimbledon, '94 and '99 US Open)
- (United States) Michael Chang ('89 French)
- (United States) Jim Courier ('91-'92 French, '92-'93 Australian)
- (Russia) Yevgeny Kafelnikov ('99 Australian, '96 French)
- (Netherlands) Richard Krajicek ('96 Wimbledon)
- (Brazil) Gustavo Kuerten ('97 French)
- (United States) Pete Sampras ('94 and '97 Australian, '93-'95 and '97-'99 Wimbledon, '90 & '93 & '95-'96 US Open)

The following are former Grand Slam finalists in the draw:

- (Spain) Alberto Berasategui ('94 French)
- (Spain) Àlex Corretja ('98 French)
- (Sweden) Thomas Enqvist ('99 Australian)
- (Croatia) Goran Ivanišević ('92 & '94 & '98 Wimbledon)
- (United States) Todd Martin ('94 Australian, '99 US Open)
- (Ukraine) Andrei Medvedev ('99 French)
- (Australia) Mark Philippoussis ('98 US Open)
- (France) Cédric Pioline ('93 US Open, '97 Wimbledon)

== Seniors ==
=== Men's singles ===
(United States) Andre Agassi defeated (Russia) Yevgeny Kafelnikov, 3–6, 6–3, 6–2, 6–4

- It was Agassi's 1st title of the year, and his 45th overall. It was his 6th career Grand Slam title, and his 2nd Australian Open title.

=== Women's singles ===
(United States) Lindsay Davenport defeated (Switzerland) Martina Hingis, 6–1, 7–5

- It was Davenport's 1st title of the year, and her 27th overall. It was her 3rd (and last) career Grand Slam title, and her 1st Australian Open title.

=== Men's doubles ===
(South Africa) Ellis Ferreira / (United States) Rick Leach defeated (Zimbabwe) Wayne Black / (Australia) Andrew Kratzmann, 6–4, 3–6, 6–3, 3–6, 18–16

=== Women's doubles ===
(United States) Lisa Raymond / (Australia) Rennae Stubbs defeated (Switzerland) Martina Hingis / (France) Mary Pierce, 6–4, 5–7, 6–4

=== Mixed doubles ===
(Australia) Rennae Stubbs / (United States) Jared Palmer defeated (Spain) Arantxa Sánchez Vicario / (Australia) Todd Woodbridge, 7–5, 7–6^{(7–3)}

== Juniors ==
=== Boys' singles ===
(United States) Andy Roddick defeated (Croatia) Mario Ančić, 7–6^{(7–2)}, 6–3

=== Girls' singles ===
(Hungary) Anikó Kapros defeated (Spain) María José Martínez Sánchez, 6–2, 3–6, 6–2

=== Boys' doubles ===
(France) Nicolas Mahut / (Spain) Tommy Robredo defeated (United States) Tres Davis / (United States) Andy Roddick, 6–2, 5–7, 11–9

=== Girls' doubles ===
(Hungary) Anikó Kapros / (Australia) Christina Wheeler defeated (United States) Lauren Barnikow / (United States) Erin Burdette, 6–3, 6–4

== Seeds ==
=== Men's singles ===
1. (United States) Andre Agassi (champion)
2. (Russia) Yevgeny Kafelnikov (final, lost to Andre Agassi)
3. (United States) Pete Sampras (semifinals, lost to Andre Agassi)
4. (Germany) Nicolas Kiefer (quarterfinals, lost to Magnus Norman)
5. (Brazil) Gustavo Kuerten (first round, lost to Albert Portas)
6. (Sweden) Thomas Enqvist (first round, lost to Richard Fromberg)
7. (Ecuador) Nicolás Lapentti (second round, lost to Arnaud Clément)
8. (United States) Todd Martin (second round, lost to Fernando Vicente)
9. (Netherlands) Richard Krajicek (second round, lost to Nicolas Escudé)
10. (Germany) Tommy Haas (second round, lost to Younes El Aynaoui)
11. (United Kingdom) Tim Henman (fourth round, lost to Chris Woodruff)
12. (Sweden) Magnus Norman (semifinals, lost to Yevgeny Kafelnikov)
13. (France) Cédric Pioline (first round, lost to Goran Ivanišević)
14. (Slovakia) Karol Kučera (first round, lost to Paradorn Srichaphan)
15. (Spain) Albert Costa (first round, lost to Christophe Rochus)
16. (Australia) Mark Philippoussis (fourth round, lost to Andre Agassi)

=== Women's singles ===
1. (Switzerland) Martina Hingis (final, lost to Lindsay Davenport)
2. (United States) Lindsay Davenport (champion)
3. (United States) Serena Williams (fourth round, lost to Elena Likhovtseva)
4. (France) Mary Pierce (fourth round, lost to Ai Sugiyama)
5. (France) Nathalie Tauziat (second round, lost to Sonya Jeyaseelan)
6. (Austria) Barbara Schett (fourth round, lost to Arantxa Sánchez)
7. (France) Amélie Mauresmo (second round, lost to Patty Schnyder)
8. (South Africa) Amanda Coetzer (second round, lost to Kristina Brandi)
9. (France) Julie Halard-Decugis (quarterfinals, lost to Lindsay Davenport)
10. (Spain) Conchita Martínez (semifinals, lost to Martina Hingis)
11. (Russia) Anna Kournikova (fourth round, lost to Lindsay Davenport)
12. (France) Sandrine Testud (fourth round, lost to Martina Hingis)
13. (Spain) Arantxa Sánchez Vicario (quarterfinals, lost to Martina Hingis)
14. (Belgium) Dominique Van Roost (second round, lost to Jennifer Capriati)
15. (Germany) Anke Huber (first round, lost to Kristie Boogert)
16. (Russia) Elena Likhovtseva (quarterfinals, lost to Conchita Martínez)

Withdrawals: Marcelo Ríos, Greg Rusedski, Patrick Rafter, Venus Williams, Monica Seles

== Prize money ==
Event		W	F	SF	QF	4R	3R	2R	1R
Singles	Men	A$755,000	A$377,500	A$189,000	A$96,500	A$51,600	A$29,500	A$18,000	A$11,625
Singles	Women	A$717,000	A$358,500	A$179,500	A$91,800	A$49,000	A$28,000	A$17,125	A$11,050

Total prize money for the event was A$12,420,500.

Preceded by 1999 US Open	Grand Slams	Succeeded by 2000 French Open
