= 2000 Tennis Masters Series =

Men's professional tennis tour

Details
- Duration: March 6 – November 20
- Edition: 11th
- Tournaments: 9

Achievements (singles)
- Most titles: (Russia) Marat Safin (2)
- Most finals: (Brazil) Gustavo Kuerten (Russia) Marat Safin (3)

The table below shows the 2000 Tennis Masters Series schedule.

The ATP Masters Series are part of the elite tour for professional men's tennis organised by the Association of Tennis Professionals.

== Results ==
* First-time champion

Masters	Singles champions	Runners-up	Score	Doubles champions	Runners-up	Score
Indian Wells Singles – Doubles	(Spain) Àlex Corretja	(Sweden) Thomas Enqvist	6–4, 6–4, 6–3	(United States) Alex O'Brien	(Netherlands) Paul Haarhuis (Australia) Sandon Stolle	6–4, 7–6
Indian Wells Singles – Doubles	(Spain) Àlex Corretja	(Sweden) Thomas Enqvist	6–4, 6–4, 6–3	(United States) Jared Palmer*	(Netherlands) Paul Haarhuis (Australia) Sandon Stolle	6–4, 7–6
Miami Singles – Doubles	(United States) Pete Sampras	(Brazil) Gustavo Kuerten	6–1, 6–7^{(2–7)}, 7–6^{(7–5)}, 7–6^{(10–8)}	(Australia) Todd Woodbridge (Australia) Mark Woodforde	(Czech Republic) Martin Damm (Slovakia) Dominik Hrbatý	6–3, 6–4
Monte Carlo Singles – Doubles	(France) Cédric Pioline*	(Slovakia) Dominik Hrbatý	6–3, 7–6^{(7–3)}, 7–6^{(8–6)}	(South Africa) Wayne Ferreira (Russia) Yevgeny Kafelnikov	(Netherlands) Paul Haarhuis (Australia) Sandon Stolle	6–3, 2–6, 6–1
Rome Singles – Doubles	(Sweden) Magnus Norman*	(Brazil) Gustavo Kuerten	6–3, 4–6, 6–4, 6–4	(Czech Republic) Martin Damm	(South Africa) Wayne Ferreira (Russia) Yevgeny Kafelnikov	6–4, 4–6, 6–3
Rome Singles – Doubles	(Sweden) Magnus Norman*	(Brazil) Gustavo Kuerten	6–3, 4–6, 6–4, 6–4	(Slovakia) Dominik Hrbatý*	(South Africa) Wayne Ferreira (Russia) Yevgeny Kafelnikov	6–4, 4–6, 6–3
Hamburg Singles – Doubles	(Brazil) Gustavo Kuerten	(Russia) Marat Safin	6–4, 5–7, 6–4, 5–7, 7–6^{(7–3)}	(Australia) Todd Woodbridge (Australia) Mark Woodforde	(Australia) Wayne Arthurs (Australia) Sandon Stolle	6–7, 6–4, 6–3
Toronto Singles – Doubles	(Russia) Marat Safin*	(Israel) Harel Levy	6–2, 6–3	(Canada) Sébastien Lareau (Canada) Daniel Nestor	(Australia) Joshua Eagle (Australia) Andrew Florent	6–3, 7–6
Cincinnati Singles – Doubles	(Sweden) Thomas Enqvist	(United Kingdom) Tim Henman	7–6^{(7–5)}, 6–4	(Australia) Todd Woodbridge (Australia) Mark Woodforde	(South Africa) Ellis Ferreira (United States) Rick Leach	7–6, 6–4
Stuttgart Singles – Doubles	(South Africa) Wayne Ferreira	(Australia) Lleyton Hewitt	7–6^{(8–6)},3–6, 6–7^{(5–7)}, 7–6^{(7–2)}, 6–2	(Czech Republic) Jiří Novák*	(United States) Donald Johnson (South Africa) Piet Norval	6–2, 6–2
Stuttgart Singles – Doubles	(South Africa) Wayne Ferreira	(Australia) Lleyton Hewitt	7–6^{(8–6)},3–6, 6–7^{(5–7)}, 7–6^{(7–2)}, 6–2	(Czech Republic) David Rikl	(United States) Donald Johnson (South Africa) Piet Norval	6–2, 6–2
Paris Singles – Doubles	(Russia) Marat Safin	(Australia) Mark Philippoussis	3–6, 7–6^{(9–7)}, 6–4, 3–6, 7–6^{(10–8)}	(Sweden) Nicklas Kulti	(Netherlands) Paul Haarhuis (Canada) Daniel Nestor	7–6^{(8–6)}, 7–5
Paris Singles – Doubles	(Russia) Marat Safin	(Australia) Mark Philippoussis	3–6, 7–6^{(9–7)}, 6–4, 3–6, 7–6^{(10–8)}	(Belarus) Max Mirnyi*	(Netherlands) Paul Haarhuis (Canada) Daniel Nestor	7–6^{(8–6)}, 7–5

== Titles Champions ==
=== Singles ===
#	Player	IN	MI	MO	HA	RO	CA	CI	ST	PA	#	Winning span
	(United States) Pete Sampras	2	3	-	-	1	-	3	-	2	11	1992–2000 (9)
	(United States) Andre Agassi	-	3	-	-	-	3	2	-	2	10	1990–1999 (10)
	(Austria) Thomas Muster	-	1	3	-	3	-	-	1	-	8	1990–1997 (8)
	(United States) Michael Chang	3	1	-	-	-	1	2	-	-	7	1990–1997 (8)
	(United States) Jim Courier	2	1	-	-	2	-	-	-	-	5	1991–1993 (3)
	(Germany) Boris Becker	-	-	-	-	-	-	-	4	1	5	1990–1996 (7)
	(Chile) Marcelo Ríos	1	1	1	1	1	-	-	-	-	5	1997–1999 (3)
	(Sweden) Stefan Edberg	1	-	-	1	-	-	1	-	1	4	1990–1992 (3)
	(Ukraine) Andrei Medvedev	-	-	1	3	-	-	-	-	-	4	1994–1997 (4)
	(Sweden) Thomas Enqvist	-	-	-	-	-	-	1	1	1	3	1996–2000 (5)
	(Brazil) Gustavo Kuerten	-	-	1	1	1	-	-	-	-	3	1999–2000 (2)
	(Spain) Sergi Bruguera	-	-	2	-	-	-	-	-	-	2	1991–1993 (3)
	(Russia) Andrei Chesnokov	-	-	1	-	-	1	-	-	-	2	1990–1991 (2)
	(Spain) Àlex Corretja	1	-	-	-	1	-	-	-	-	2	1997–2000 (4)
	(South Africa) Wayne Ferreira	-	-	-	-	-	1	-	1	-	2	1996–2000 (5)
	(France) Guy Forget	-	-	-	-	-	-	1	-	1	2	1991
	(Croatia) Goran Ivanišević	-	-	-	-	-	-	-	1	1	2	1992–1993 (2)
	(Netherlands) Richard Krajicek	-	1	-	-	-	-	-	1	-	2	1998–1999 (2)
	(Australia) Patrick Rafter	-	-	-	-	-	1	1	-	-	2	1998
	(Russia) Marat Safin	-	-	-	-	-	1	-	-	1	2	2000
	(Germany) Michael Stich	-	-	-	1	-	-	-	1	-	2	1993
	(Spain) Juan Aguilera	-	-	-	1	-	-	-	-	-	1	1990
	(Spain) Albert Costa	-	-	-	1	-	-	-	-	-	1	1998
	(Spain) Roberto Carretero	-	-	-	1	-	-	-	-	-	1	1996
	(Sweden) Thomas Johansson	-	-	-	-	-	1	-	-	-	1	1999
	(Czech Republic) Petr Korda	-	-	-	-	-	-	-	1	-	1	1997
	(Spain) Carlos Moyá	-	-	1	-	-	1	-	-	-	1	1998
	(Sweden) Magnus Norman	-	-	-	-	1	-	-	-	-	1	2000
	(Czech Republic) Karel Nováček	-	-	-	1	-	-	-	-	-	1	1991
	(Sweden) Mikael Pernfors	-	-	-	-	-	1	-	-	-	1	1993
	(Australia) Mark Philippoussis	1	-	-	-	-	-	-	-	-	1	1999
	(France) Cédric Pioline	-	-	1	-	-	-	-	-	-	1	2000
	(United Kingdom) Greg Rusedski	-	-	-	-	-	-	-	-	1	1	1998
	(Spain) Emilio Sánchez	-	-	-	-	1	-	-	-	-	1	1991
	(United States) Chris Woodruff	-	-	-	-	-	1	-	-	-	1	1997
#	Player	IN	MI	MO	HA	RO	CA	CI	ST	PA	#	Winning span

== See also ==
- ATP Tour Masters 1000
- 2000 ATP Tour
- 2000 WTA Tier I Series
- 2000 WTA Tour
