= 1999 Swisscom Challenge – Singles qualifying =

Singles qualifying
- 1999 Swisscom Challenge

Events
Singles	Doubles
← 1998 ·	Swisscom Challenge	· 2000 →

The 1999 Swisscom Challenge was a WTA tennis tournament, played on indoor hard courts.

== Players ==
=== Seeds ===
1. (Slovakia) Henrieta Nagyová (qualifying competition, lucky loser)
2. (Spain) Magüi Serna (qualifier)
3. (United States) Corina Morariu (qualifier)
4. (Spain) María Sánchez Lorenzo (second round)
5. (Slovakia) Karina Habšudová (second round)
6. (Canada) Maureen Drake (second round)
7. (Russia) Tatiana Panova (qualifier)
8. (United States) Tara Snyder (qualifying competition)

=== Qualifiers ===
1. (Russia) Elena Dementieva
2. (Russia) Tatiana Panova
3. (United States) Corina Morariu
4. (Spain) Magüi Serna

==== Lucky loser ====
1. (Slovakia) Henrieta Nagyová

== Qualifying draw ==
=== Key ===
- Q = Qualifier
- WC = Wild card
- LL = Lucky loser
- Alt = Alternate
- SE = Special exempt
- PR = Protected ranking
- ITF = ITF entry
- JE = Junior exempt
- w/o = Walkover
- r = Retired
- d = Defaulted
- SR = Special ranking

=== First qualifier ===
First round
1	(Slovakia) Henrieta Nagyová
Bye
(Poland) Anna Żarska	3	2
(Czech Republic) Sandra Kleinová	6	6
(Russia) Elena Dementieva	6	7^{7}
(Belarus) Olga Barabanschikova	2	6^{4}
Bye
5	(Slovakia) Karina Habšudová

Second round
1	(Slovakia) Henrieta Nagyová	7	5	1
(Czech Republic) Sandra Kleinová	5	7	6
(Russia) Elena Dementieva	6	6
5	(Slovakia) Karina Habšudová	2	3

Qualifying competition
1	(Slovakia) Henrieta Nagyová	3	6^{5}
(Russia) Elena Dementieva	6	7^{7}

=== Second qualifier ===
First round
4	(Spain) María Sánchez Lorenzo
Bye
(Czech Republic) Denisa Chládková	6	6
(Germany) Angelika Bachmann	0	1
(Czech Republic) Zuzana Ondrášková	w/o
(Germany) Jana Kandarr
Bye
7	(Russia) Tatiana Panova

Second round
4	(Spain) María Sánchez Lorenzo	3	7^{9}	2
(Czech Republic) Denisa Chládková	6	6^{7}	6
(Czech Republic) Zuzana Ondrášková	1	2
7	(Russia) Tatiana Panova	6	6

Qualifying competition
(Czech Republic) Denisa Chládková	5	6	1
7	(Russia) Tatiana Panova	7	4	6

=== Third qualifier ===
First round
6	(Canada) Maureen Drake
Bye
(Russia) Nadia Petrova	6	6
(United States) Lilia Osterloh	1	3
(Germany) Camilla Kremer	6	6
(Germany) Sabine Lohmann	3	2
Bye
3	(United States) Corina Morariu

Second round
6	(Canada) Maureen Drake	1	3
(Russia) Nadia Petrova	6	6
(Germany) Camilla Kremer	1	2
3	(United States) Corina Morariu	6	6

Qualifying competition
(Russia) Nadia Petrova	6^{4}	6	6^{7}
3	(United States) Corina Morariu	7^{7}	1	7^{9}

=== Fourth qualifier ===
First round
8	(United States) Tara Snyder	4	6	6
(Germany) Miriam Schnitzer	6	3	4
(Croatia) Jelena Kostanić	6	6^{5}	6
(Czech Republic) Adriana Gerši	1	7^{7}	4
(Switzerland) Miroslava Vavrinec	6	6
(Germany) Stephanie Gehrlein	0	1
Bye
2	(Spain) Magüi Serna

Second round
8	(United States) Tara Snyder	6	6
(Croatia) Jelena Kostanić	4	4
(Switzerland) Miroslava Vavrinec	3	5
2	(Spain) Magüi Serna	6	7

Qualifying competition
8	(United States) Tara Snyder	3	6	3
2	(Spain) Magüi Serna	6	0	6
