= 1999 ATP Super 9 =

Men's professional tennis tour

Details
- Duration: March 5 – November 8
- Edition: 10th
- Tournaments: 9

Achievements (singles)
- Most titles: (Brazil) Gustavo Kuerten (2)
- Most finals: (Netherlands) Richard Krajicek (Brazil) Gustavo Kuerten (Australia) Patrick Rafter (Chile) Marcelo Ríos (2)

The 1999 ATP Super 9 (also known as Mercedes-Benz Super 9 for sponsorship reasons) were part of the 1999 ATP Tour, the elite tour for professional men's tennis organised by the Association of Tennis Professionals.

== Results ==
* First-time champion

Masters	Singles champions	Runners-up	Score	Doubles champions	Runners-up	Score
Indian Wells Singles – Doubles	(Australia) Mark Philippoussis*	(Spain) Carlos Moyà	5–7, 6–4, 6–4, 4–6, 6–2	(Zimbabwe) Wayne Black*	(South Africa) Ellis Ferreira (United States) Rick Leach	6–3, 6–4
Indian Wells Singles – Doubles	(Australia) Mark Philippoussis*	(Spain) Carlos Moyà	5–7, 6–4, 6–4, 4–6, 6–2	(Australia) Sandon Stolle	(South Africa) Ellis Ferreira (United States) Rick Leach	6–3, 6–4
Miami Singles – Doubles	(Netherlands) Richard Krajicek	(France) Sébastien Grosjean	4–6, 6–1, 6–2, 7–5	(Zimbabwe) Wayne Black (Australia) Sandon Stolle	(Germany) Boris Becker (United States) Jan-Michael Gambill	6–1, 6–1
Monte Carlo Singles – Doubles	(Brazil) Gustavo Kuerten*	(Chile) Marcelo Ríos	6–4, 2–1 ret.	(France) Olivier Delaître* (United Kingdom) Tim Henman*	(Czech Republic) Jiří Novák (Czech Republic) David Rikl	3–6, 6–4, 6–2
Hamburg Singles – Doubles	(Chile) Marcelo Ríos	(Argentina) Mariano Zabaleta	6–7^{(5–7)}, 7–5, 5–7, 7–6^{(7–5)}, 6–2	(Australia) Wayne Arthurs* (Australia) Andrew Kratzmann*	(Netherlands) Paul Haarhuis (United States) Jared Palmer	4–6, 7–6, 6–4
Rome Singles – Doubles	(Brazil) Gustavo Kuerten	(Australia) Patrick Rafter	6–4, 7–5, 7–6^{(8–6)}	(South Africa) Ellis Ferreira (United States) Rick Leach	(South Africa) David Adams (South Africa) John–Laffnie de Jager	6–7, 6–1, 6–2
Montreal Singles – Doubles	(Sweden) Thomas Johansson*	(Russia) Yevgeny Kafelnikov	1–6, 6–3, 6–3	(Sweden) Jonas Björkman (Australia) Patrick Rafter	(Zimbabwe) Byron Black (South Africa) Wayne Ferreira	7–6, 6–4
Cincinnati Singles – Doubles	(United States) Pete Sampras	(Australia) Patrick Rafter	7–6^{(9–7)}, 6–3	(Sweden) Jonas Björkman (Zimbabwe) Byron Black	(Australia) Todd Woodbridge (Australia) Mark Woodforde	6–1, 2–6, 7–6
Stuttgart Singles – Doubles	(Sweden) Thomas Enqvist	(Netherlands) Richard Krajicek	6–1, 6–4, 5–7, 7–5	(Sweden) Jonas Björkman (Zimbabwe) Byron Black	(South Africa) David Adams (South Africa) John–Laffnie de Jager	6–3, 6–4
Paris Singles – Doubles	(United States) Andre Agassi	(Russia) Marat Safin	7–6^{(7–1)}, 6–2, 4–6, 6–4	(Canada) Sébastien Lareau (United States) Alex O'Brien	(Netherlands) Paul Haarhuis (United States) Jared Palmer	6–1, 6–3

== Titles Champions ==
=== Singles ===
#	Player	IN	MI	MO	HA	RO	CA	CI	ST	PA	#	Winning span
1.	(United States) Andre Agassi	-	3	-	-	-	3	2	-	2	10	1990–1999 (10)
	(United States) Pete Sampras	2	2	-	-	1	-	3	-	2	10	1992–1999 (8)
3.	(Austria) Thomas Muster	-	1	3	-	3	-	-	1	-	8	1990–1997 (8)
4.	(United States) Michael Chang	3	1	-	-	-	1	2	-	-	7	1990–1997 (8)
5.	(United States) Jim Courier	2	1	-	-	2	-	-	-	-	5	1991–1993 (3)
	(Germany) Boris Becker	-	-	-	-	-	-	-	4	1	5	1990–1996 (7)
	(Chile) Marcelo Ríos	1	1	1	1	1	-	-	-	-	5	1997–1999 (3)
8.	(Sweden) Stefan Edberg	1	-	-	1	-	-	1	-	1	4	1990–1992 (3)
	(Ukraine) Andrei Medvedev	-	-	1	3	-	-	-	-	-	4	1994–1997 (4)
10.	(Spain) Sergi Bruguera	-	-	2	-	-	-	-	-	-	2	1991–1993 (3)
	(Russia) Andrei Chesnokov	-	-	1	-	-	1	-	-	-	2	1990–1991 (2)
	(Sweden) Thomas Enqvist	-	-	-	-	-	-	-	1	1	2	1996–1999 (4)
	(France) Guy Forget	-	-	-	-	-	-	1	-	1	2	1991
	(Croatia) Goran Ivanišević	-	-	-	-	-	-	-	1	1	2	1992–1993 (2)
	(Netherlands) Richard Krajicek	-	1	-	-	-	-	-	1	-	2	1998–1999 (2)
	(Brazil) Gustavo Kuerten	-	-	1	-	1	-	-	-	-	2	1999
	(Australia) Patrick Rafter	-	-	-	-	-	1	1	-	-	2	1998
	(Germany) Michael Stich	-	-	-	1	-	-	-	1	-	2	1993
19.	(Spain) Juan Aguilera	-	-	-	1	-	-	-	-	-	1	1990
	(Spain) Àlex Corretja	-	-	-	-	1	-	-	-	-	1	1997
	(Spain) Albert Costa	-	-	-	1	-	-	-	-	-	1	1998
	(Spain) Roberto Carretero	-	-	-	1	-	-	-	-	-	1	1996
	(South Africa) Wayne Ferreira	-	-	-	-	-	1	-	-	-	1	1996
	(Sweden) Thomas Johansson	-	-	-	-	-	1	-	-	-	1	1999
	(Czech Republic) Petr Korda	-	-	-	-	-	-	-	1	-	1	1997
	(Spain) Carlos Moyá	-	-	1	-	-	1	-	-	-	1	1998
	(Czech Republic) Karel Nováček	-	-	-	1	-	-	-	-	-	1	1991
	(Sweden) Mikael Pernfors	-	-	-	-	-	1	-	-	-	1	1993
	(Australia) Mark Philippoussis	1	-	-	-	-	-	-	-	-	1	1999
	(United Kingdom) Greg Rusedski	-	-	-	-	-	-	-	-	1	1	1998
	(Spain) Emilio Sánchez	-	-	-	-	1	-	-	-	-	1	1991
	(United States) Chris Woodruff	-	-	-	-	-	1	-	-	-	1	1997
#	Player	IN	MI	MO	HA	RO	CA	CI	ST	PA	#	Winning span

== See also ==
- ATP Tour Masters 1000
- 1999 ATP Tour
- 1999 WTA Tier I Series
- 1999 WTA Tour
