= 2000 WTA Tier I Series =

Women's professional tennis tour

Details
- Duration: January 31 – October 29
- Edition: 11th
- Tournaments: 9

Achievements (singles)
- Most titles: (Switzerland) Martina Hingis (5)
- Most finals: (Switzerland) Martina Hingis (6)

The WTA Tier I events are part of the elite tour for professional women's tennis organised by the WTA called the WTA Tour.

== Tournaments ==
Tournament	Country	Location	Surface	Date	Prize money
Toray Pan Pacific Open	Japan	Tokyo	Carpet (i)	Jan 31 – Feb 6	$1,080,000
Tennis Masters Series	United States	Indian Wells	Hard	Mar 6 – 19	$2,000,000
Ericsson Open	United States	Key Biscayne	Hard	Mar 20 – Apr 9	$2,525,000
Family Circle Cup	United States	Hilton Head Island	Clay (green)	Apr 17 – 23	$1,080,000
German Open	Germany	Berlin	Clay	May 8 – 14	$1,080,000
Italian Open	Italy	Rome	Clay	May 15 – 21	$1,080,000
du Maurier Open	Canada	Montreal	Hard	Aug 14 – 20	$1,080,000
Swisscom Challenge	Switzerland	Zürich	Carpet (i)	Oct 9 – 15	$1,080,000
Kremlin Cup	Russia	Moscow	Carpet (i)	Oct 23 – 29	$1,080,000

== Results ==
* First-time champion

Tournament	Singles champions	Runners-up	Score	Doubles champions	Runners-up	Score
Tokyo Singles – Doubles	(Switzerland) Martina Hingis	(France) Sandrine Testud	6–3, 7–5	(Switzerland) Martina Hingis (France) Mary Pierce	(France) Alexandra Fusai (France) Nathalie Tauziat	6–4, 6–1
Indian Wells Singles – Doubles	(United States) Lindsay Davenport	(Switzerland) Martina Hingis	4–6, 6–4, 6–0	(United States) Lindsay Davenport	(Russia) Anna Kournikova (Belarus) Natasha Zvereva	6–2, 6–3
Indian Wells Singles – Doubles	(United States) Lindsay Davenport	(Switzerland) Martina Hingis	4–6, 6–4, 6–0	(United States) Corina Morariu*	(Russia) Anna Kournikova (Belarus) Natasha Zvereva	6–2, 6–3
Miami Singles – Doubles	(Switzerland) Martina Hingis	(United States) Lindsay Davenport	6–3, 6–2	(France) Julie Halard-Decugis* (Japan) Ai Sugiyama*	(United States) Nicole Arendt (Netherlands) Manon Bollegraf	4–6, 7–5, 6–4
Hilton Head Singles – Doubles	(France) Mary Pierce	(Spain) Arantxa Sánchez Vicario	6–1, 6–0	(Spain) Virginia Ruano Pascual (Argentina) Paola Suárez	(Spain) Conchita Martínez (Argentina) Patricia Tarabini	7–5, 6–3
Berlin Singles – Doubles	(Spain) Conchita Martínez	(South Africa) Amanda Coetzer	6–1, 6–2	(Spain) Conchita Martínez (Spain) Arantxa Sánchez Vicario	(South Africa) Amanda Coetzer (United States) Corina Morariu	3–6, 6–2, 7–6^{(9–7)}
Rome Singles – Doubles	(United States) Monica Seles	(France) Amélie Mauresmo	6–2, 7–6^{(7–4)}	(United States) Lisa Raymond (Australia) Rennae Stubbs	(Spain) Arantxa Sánchez Vicario (Spain) Magüi Serna	6–3, 4–6, 6–3
Montréal Singles – Doubles	(Switzerland) Martina Hingis	(United States) Serena Williams	0–6, 6–3, 3–0, ret.	(Switzerland) Martina Hingis (France) Nathalie Tauziat	(France) Julie Halard-Decugis (Japan) Ai Sugiyama	6–3, 3–6, 6–4
Zürich Singles – Doubles	(Switzerland) Martina Hingis	(United States) Lindsay Davenport	6–2, 4–6, 7–5	(Switzerland) Martina Hingis (Russia) Anna Kournikova	(United States) Kimberly Po (France) Anne-Gaëlle Sidot	6–3, 6–4
Moscow Singles – Doubles	(Switzerland) Martina Hingis	(Russia) Anna Kournikova	6–3, 6–1	(France) Julie Halard-Decugis (Japan) Ai Sugiyama	(Switzerland) Martina Hingis (Russia) Anna Kournikova	4–6, 6–4, 7–6^{(7–5)}

== See also ==
- WTA Tier I events
- 2000 WTA Tour
- 2000 Tennis Masters Series
- 2000 ATP Tour
