= 1999 WTA Tier I Series =

Women's professional tennis tour

Details
- Duration: February 1 – October 24
- Edition: 10th
- Tournaments: 9

Achievements (singles)
- Most titles: (Switzerland) Martina Hingis (4)
- Most finals: (Switzerland) Martina Hingis (5)

The WTA Tier I events are part of the elite tour for professional women's tennis organised by the WTA called the WTA Tour.

== Tournaments ==
Tournament	Country	Location	Surface	Date	Prize money
Toray Pan Pacific Open	Japan	Tokyo	Carpet (i)	Feb 1 – 7	$1,050,000
Evert Cup	United States	Indian Wells	Hard	Mar 1 – 14	$1,400,000
Lipton Championships	United States	Miami	Hard	Mar 15 – 28	$2,075,000
Family Circle Cup	United States	Hilton Head	Clay	Mar 29 – Apr	$1,050,000
Italian Open	Italy	Rome	Clay	May 3 – 9	$1,050,000
German Open	Germany	Berlin	Clay	May 10 – 16	$1,050,000
du Maurier Open	Canada	Toronto	Hard	Aug 16 – 22	$1,050,000
Swisscom Challenge	Switzerland	Zurich	Hard (i)	Oct 11 – 17	$1,050,000
Kremlin Cup	Russia	Moscow	Carpet (i)	Oct 18 – 24	$1,050,000

== Results ==
* First-time champion

Tournament	Singles champions	Runners-up	Score	Doubles champions	Runners-up	Score
Tokyo Singles – Doubles	(Switzerland) Martina Hingis	(South Africa) Amanda Coetzer	6–2, 6–1	(United States) Lindsay Davenport (Belarus) Natasha Zvereva	(Switzerland) Martina Hingis (Czech Republic) Jana Novotná	6–2, 6–3
Indian Wells Singles – Doubles	(United States) Serena Williams*	(Germany) Steffi Graf	6–3, 3–6, 7–5	(Switzerland) Martina Hingis	(United States) Mary Joe Fernández (Czech Republic) Jana Novotná	6–2, 6–2
Indian Wells Singles – Doubles	(United States) Serena Williams*	(Germany) Steffi Graf	6–3, 3–6, 7–5	(Russia) Anna Kournikova*	(United States) Mary Joe Fernández (Czech Republic) Jana Novotná	6–2, 6–2
Miami Singles – Doubles	(United States) Venus Williams	(United States) Serena Williams	6–1, 4–6, 6–4	(Switzerland) Martina Hingis (Czech Republic) Jana Novotná	(United States) Mary Joe Fernández (United States) Monica Seles	0–6, 6–4, 7–6^{(7–1)}
Hilton Head Singles – Doubles	(Switzerland) Martina Hingis	(Russia) Anna Kournikova	6–4, 6–3	(Russia) Elena Likhovtseva*	(Austria) Barbara Schett (Switzerland) Patty Schnyder	6–1, 6–4
Hilton Head Singles – Doubles	(Switzerland) Martina Hingis	(Russia) Anna Kournikova	6–4, 6–3	(Czech Republic) Jana Novotná	(Austria) Barbara Schett (Switzerland) Patty Schnyder	6–1, 6–4
Rome Singles – Doubles	(United States) Venus Williams	(France) Mary Pierce	6–4, 6–2	(Switzerland) Martina Hingis (Russia) Anna Kournikova	(France) Alexandra Fusai (France) Nathalie Tauziat	6–2, 6–2
Berlin Singles – Doubles	(Switzerland) Martina Hingis	(France) Julie Halard-Decugis	6–0, 6–1	(France) Alexandra Fusai* (France) Nathalie Tauziat*	(Czech Republic) Jana Novotná (Argentina) Patricia Tarabini	6–3, 7–5
Toronto Singles – Doubles	(Switzerland) Martina Hingis	(United States) Monica Seles	6–4, 6–4	(Czech Republic) Jana Novotná (France) Mary Pierce	(Spain) Arantxa Sánchez Vicario (Latvia) Larisa Neiland	6–3, 2–6, 6–3
Zürich Singles – Doubles	(United States) Venus Williams	(Switzerland) Martina Hingis	6–3, 6–4	(United States) Lisa Raymond*	(France) Nathalie Tauziat (Belarus) Natasha Zvereva	6–2, 6–2
Zürich Singles – Doubles	(United States) Venus Williams	(Switzerland) Martina Hingis	6–3, 6–4	(Australia) Rennae Stubbs	(France) Nathalie Tauziat (Belarus) Natasha Zvereva	6–2, 6–2
Moscow Singles – Doubles	(France) Nathalie Tauziat*	(Austria) Barbara Schett	2–6, 6–4, 6–1	(United States) Lisa Raymond (Australia) Rennae Stubbs	(France) Julie Halard-Decugis (Germany) Anke Huber	6–1, 6–0

== Tournament details ==
Key

- Q = Qualifier
- WC = Wild card
- LL = Lucky loser
- Alt = Alternate
- ITF = ITF entry
- PR = Protected ranking
- SR = Special ranking
- SE = Special exempt
- JE = Junior exempt
- JR = Junior Accelerator Programme entrant
- CO = College Accelerator Programme entrant
- NG = Next Gen Accelerator Program entrant
- w/o = Walkover
- r = Retired
- d = Defaulted

=== Tokyo ===
Tournament name	Toray Pan Pacific Open
Dates	February 2 – 7
Surface	Carpet (Indoors)
Location	Tokyo, Japan
Prize money	$ 1,000,000

==== Singles ====
Quarterfinals
1	(United States) Lindsay Davenport	6	4	3
7	(South Africa) Amanda Coetzer	2	6	6
4	(United States) Monica Seles	7	6
6	(Russia) Anna Kournikova	5	3
8	(Belarus) Natasha Zvereva	5	0^{r}
3	(Czech Republic) Jana Novotná	7	0
5	(Germany) Steffi Graf	6	2	4
2	(Switzerland) Martina Hingis	3	6	6

Semifinals
7	(South Africa) Amanda Coetzer	6	6
4	(United States) Monica Seles	4	2
3	(Czech Republic) Jana Novotná	3	4
2	(Switzerland) Martina Hingis	6	6

Final
7	(South Africa) Amanda Coetzer	2	1
2	(Switzerland) Martina Hingis	6	6

==== Doubles ====
Semifinals
1	(Switzerland) Martina Hingis (Czech Republic) Jana Novotná	6	6
(South Africa) Mariaan de Swardt (Ukraine) Elena Tatarkova	3	3
(Argentina) Patricia Tarabini (Netherlands) Caroline Vis	1	0
2	(United States) Lindsay Davenport (Belarus) Natasha Zvereva	6	6

Final
1	(Switzerland) Martina Hingis (Czech Republic) Jana Novotná	2	3
2	(United States) Lindsay Davenport (Belarus) Natasha Zvereva	6	6

=== Indian Wells ===
Tournament name	Evert Cup
Dates	March 5 – 14
Surface	Hard (Outdoors)
Location	Indian Wells, California, United States
Prize money	$ 1,400,000

==== Singles ====
Quarterfinals
1	(Switzerland) Martina Hingis	3	6^{2}
(United States) Chanda Rubin	6	7^{7}
4	(Czech Republic) Jana Novotná	2	0
5	(Germany) Steffi Graf	6	6
12	(France) Sandrine Testud	7	6
(Slovakia) Henrieta Nagyová	1	3
6	(France) Mary Pierce	5	6^{1}
(United States) Serena Williams	7	7^{7}

Semifinals
(United States) Chanda Rubin	6	4	2
5	(Germany) Steffi Graf	2	6	6
12	(France) Sandrine Testud	5	0
(United States) Serena Williams	7	6

Final
5	(Germany) Steffi Graf	3	6	5
(United States) Serena Williams	6	3	7

==== Doubles ====
Semifinals
(United States) Serena Williams (United States) Venus Williams	3	4
(United States) Mary Joe Fernández (Czech Republic) Jana Novotná	6	6
7	(Spain) Conchita Martínez (Argentina) Patricia Tarabini	1	0
2	(Switzerland) Martina Hingis (Russia) Anna Kournikova	6	6

Final
(United States) Mary Joe Fernández (Czech Republic) Jana Novotná	2	2
2	(Switzerland) Martina Hingis (Russia) Anna Kournikova	6	6

=== Miami ===
Tournament name	Lipton Championships
Dates	March 15 – 29
Surface	Hard (Outdoors)
Location	Key Biscayne, Florida, United States
Prize money	$ 2,075,000

==== Singles ====
Quarterfinals
1	(Switzerland) Martina Hingis	6	6
20	(Austria) Barbara Schett	1	1
16	(United States) Serena Williams	6	6
9	(South Africa) Amanda Coetzer	4	0
6	(United States) Venus Williams	5	6	6
4	(Czech Republic) Jana Novotná	7	2	3
7	(Germany) Steffi Graf	w/o
2	(United States) Lindsay Davenport

Semifinals
1	(Switzerland) Martina Hingis	4	6^{3}
16	(United States) Serena Williams	6	7^{7}
6	(United States) Venus Williams	6	6
7	(Germany) Steffi Graf	2	4

Final
16	(United States) Serena Williams	1	6	4
6	(United States) Venus Williams	6	4	6

==== Doubles ====
Quarterfinals
1	(Switzerland) Martina Hingis (Czech Republic) Jana Novotná	7^{7}	6
13	(Italy) Silvia Farina (Slovakia) Karina Habšudová	6^{3}	3
(Romania) Cătălina Cristea (Romania) Ruxandra Dragomir	5	7^{9}	4
(Zimbabwe) Cara Black (Kazakhstan) Irina Selyutina	7	6^{7}	6
14	(United States) Mary Joe Fernández (United States) Monica Seles	5	6	7^{7}
4	(Latvia) Larisa Neiland (Spain) Arantxa Sánchez Vicario	7	4	6^{3}
5	(South Africa) Mariaan de Swardt (Ukraine) Elena Tatarkova	3	6	6^{3}
2	(Russia) Anna Kournikova (Russia) Elena Likhovtseva	6	4	7^{7}

Semifinals
1	(Switzerland) Martina Hingis (Czech Republic) Jana Novotná	1	7^{7}	6
(Zimbabwe) Cara Black (Kazakhstan) Irina Selyutina	6	6^{4}	1
14	(United States) Mary Joe Fernández (United States) Monica Seles	6	6
2	(Russia) Anna Kournikova (Russia) Elena Likhovtseva	2	1

Final
1	(Switzerland) Martina Hingis (Czech Republic) Jana Novotná	0	6	7^{7}
14	(United States) Mary Joe Fernández (United States) Monica Seles	6	4	6^{1}

=== Hilton Heads ===
Tournament name	Family Circle Cup
Dates	March 29 – April 4
Surface	Green clay (Outdoors)
Location	Hilton Head Island, South Carolina, United States
Prize money	$ 1,050,000

==== Singles ====
Quarterfinals
1	(Switzerland) Martina Hingis	6	7^{7}
11	(Belarus) Natasha Zvereva	0	6^{0}
3	(Czech Republic) Jana Novotná	6	6
16	(Slovakia) Henrieta Nagyová	2	4
7	(Russia) Anna Kournikova	6	2
(Germany) Andrea Glass	2	1^{r}
6	(Switzerland) Patty Schnyder	6	4	7^{7}
14	(Russia) Elena Likhovtseva	3	6	6^{3}

Semifinals
1	(Switzerland) Martina Hingis	6	6
3	(Czech Republic) Jana Novotná	2	3
7	(Russia) Anna Kournikova	6^{5}	6	6
6	(Switzerland) Patty Schnyder	7^{7}	0	3

Final
1	(Switzerland) Martina Hingis	6	6
7	(Russia) Anna Kournikova	4	3

==== Doubles ====
Semifinals
1	(United States) Lindsay Davenport (Belarus) Natasha Zvereva	7	6^{5}	2
(Austria) Barbara Schett (Switzerland) Patty Schnyder	5	7^{7}	6
(France) Alexandra Fusai (France) Anne-Gaëlle Sidot	3	6	2
2	(Russia) Elena Likhovtseva (Czech Republic) Jana Novotná	6	1	6

Final
(Austria) Barbara Schett (Switzerland) Patty Schnyder	1	4
2	(Russia) Elena Likhovtseva (Czech Republic) Jana Novotná	6	6

=== Rome ===
Tournament name	Italian Open
Dates	May 3 – 9
Surface	Red clay (Outdoors)
Location	Rome, Italy
Prize money	$ 1,050,000

==== Singles ====
Quarterfinals
1	(Switzerland) Martina Hingis	6	6
6	(United States) Serena Williams	2	2
3	(United States) Venus Williams	7^{7}	6
11	(Belgium) Dominique Van Roost	6^{1}	2
8	(France) Sandrine Testud	4	5
4	(France) Mary Pierce	6	7
10	(France) Amélie Mauresmo	6	6
(Austria) Sylvia Plischke	2	3

Semifinals
1	(Switzerland) Martina Hingis	4	6	4
3	(United States) Venus Williams	6	1	6
4	(France) Mary Pierce	6^{1}	6	6
10	(France) Amélie Mauresmo	7^{7}	2	4

Final
3	(United States) Venus Williams	6	6
4	(France) Mary Pierce	4	2

==== Doubles ====
Semifinals
1	(Switzerland) Martina Hingis (Russia) Anna Kournikova	6	6
6	(Romania) Irina Spîrlea (Netherlands) Caroline Vis	4	3
(France) Mary Pierce (Belarus) Natasha Zvereva	2	1
2	(France) Alexandra Fusai (France) Nathalie Tauziat	6	6

Final
1	(Switzerland) Martina Hingis (Russia) Anna Kournikova	6	6
2	(France) Alexandra Fusai (France) Nathalie Tauziat	2	2

=== Berlin ===
Tournament name	German Open
Dates	May 10 – 16
Surface	Red clay (Outdoors)
Location	Berlin, Germany
Prize money	$ 1,050,000

==== Singles ====
Quarterfinals
1	(Switzerland) Martina Hingis	7	7
16	(Austria) Barbara Schett	5	5
4	(Spain) Arantxa Sánchez Vicario	6	3
7	(United States) Serena Williams	3	2^{r}
(France) Julie Halard-Decugis	5	6	6
3	(Germany) Steffi Graf	7	4	4
8	(Switzerland) Patty Schnyder	6	1	1
(Romania) Ruxandra Dragomir	3	6	6

Semifinals
1	(Switzerland) Martina Hingis	6	6
4	(Spain) Arantxa Sánchez Vicario	4	0
(France) Julie Halard-Decugis	6	6
(Romania) Ruxandra Dragomir	2	2

Final
1	(Switzerland) Martina Hingis	6	6
(France) Julie Halard-Decugis	0	1

==== Doubles ====
Semifinals
1	(Czech Republic) Jana Novotná (Argentina) Patricia Tarabini	6	6
(Romania) Ruxandra Dragomir (Argentina) Florencia Labat	3	1
4	(Latvia) Larisa Neiland (Spain) Arantxa Sánchez Vicario	4	1
2	(France) Alexandra Fusai (France) Nathalie Tauziat	6	6

Final
1	(Czech Republic) Jana Novotná (Argentina) Patricia Tarabini	3	5
2	(France) Alexandra Fusai (France) Nathalie Tauziat	6	7

=== Toronto ===
Tournament name	du Maurier Open
Dates	August 16 – 22
Surface	Hard (Outdoors)
Location	Toronto, Ontario, Canada
Prize money	$ 1,050,000

==== Singles ====
Quarterfinals
1	(Switzerland) Martina Hingis	6	6
5	(Spain) Arantxa Sánchez Vicario	1	1
3	(France) Mary Pierce	6	6
10	(France) Sandrine Testud	1	3
6	(South Africa) Amanda Coetzer	7	4	4
(France) Anne-Gaëlle Sidot	5	6	6
9	(Austria) Barbara Schett	3	6	1
2	(United States) Monica Seles	6	3	6

Semifinals
1	(Switzerland) Martina Hingis	7^{7}	6
3	(France) Mary Pierce	6^{3}	3
(France) Anne-Gaëlle Sidot	3	4
2	(United States) Monica Seles	6	6

Final
1	(Switzerland) Martina Hingis	6	6
2	(United States) Monica Seles	4	4

==== Doubles ====
Semifinals
5	(Latvia) Larisa Neiland (Spain) Arantxa Sánchez Vicario	6	6
3	(South Africa) Mariaan de Swardt (Ukraine) Elena Tatarkova	3	1
4	(Czech Republic) Jana Novotná (France) Mary Pierce	5	7	6
6	(Romania) Irina Spîrlea (Netherlands) Caroline Vis	7	5	2

Final
5	(Latvia) Larisa Neiland (Spain) Arantxa Sánchez Vicario	3	6	3
4	(Czech Republic) Jana Novotná (France) Mary Pierce	6	2	6

=== Zurich ===
Tournament name	Swisscom Challenge
Dates	October 11 – 17
Surface	Hard (Indoors)
Location	Zurich, Switzerland
Prize money	$ 1,050,000

==== Singles ====
Quarterfinals
1	(Switzerland) Martina Hingis	7	6
Q	(United States) Corina Morariu	5	2
4	(South Africa) Amanda Coetzer	3	6	2
8	(France) Nathalie Tauziat	6	3	6
7	(Belgium) Dominique Van Roost	2	4
3	(France) Mary Pierce	6	6
6	(France) Julie Halard-Decugis	2	3
2	(United States) Venus Williams	6	6

Semifinals
1	(Switzerland) Martina Hingis	6	4	6
8	(France) Nathalie Tauziat	3	6	3
3	(France) Mary Pierce	4	4
2	(United States) Venus Williams	6	6

Final
1	(Switzerland) Martina Hingis	3	4
2	(United States) Venus Williams	6	6

==== Doubles ====
Semifinals
1	(France) Nathalie Tauziat (Belarus) Natasha Zvereva	6	6
(Netherlands) Miriam Oremans (Switzerland) Patty Schnyder	0	2
3	(United States) Lisa Raymond (Australia) Rennae Stubbs	6	6
Q	(Croatia) Jelena Kostanić (United States) Tara Snyder	1	0

Final
1	(France) Nathalie Tauziat (Belarus) Natasha Zvereva	2	2
3	(United States) Lisa Raymond (Australia) Rennae Stubbs	6	6

=== Moscow ===
Tournament name	Kremlin Cup
Dates	October 18 – 24
Surface	Carpet (Indoors)
Location	Moscow, Russia
Prize money	$ 1,050,000

==== Singles ====
Quarterfinals
(Japan) Ai Sugiyama	3	5
(United States) Lisa Raymond	6	7
4	(France) Nathalie Tauziat	6	6
(Germany) Anke Huber	4	3
5	(Belgium) Dominique Van Roost	6	4	6
3	(France) Julie Halard-Decugis	1	6	1
(Italy) Silvia Farina	6	4	3
2	(Austria) Barbara Schett	1	6	6

Semifinals
(United States) Lisa Raymond	4	2
4	(France) Nathalie Tauziat	6	6
5	(Belgium) Dominique Van Roost	5	6^{6}
2	(Austria) Barbara Schett	7	7^{8}

Final
4	(France) Nathalie Tauziat	2	6	6
2	(Austria) Barbara Schett	6	4	1

==== Doubles ====
Semifinals
1	(Ukraine) Elena Tatarkova (Belarus) Natasha Zvereva	6^{7}	4
3	(United States) Lisa Raymond (Australia) Rennae Stubbs	7^{9}	6
(France) Julie Halard-Decugis (Germany) Anke Huber	6	5	6
2	(Russia) Elena Likhovtseva (Japan) Ai Sugiyama	2	7	0

Final
3	(United States) Lisa Raymond (Australia) Rennae Stubbs	6	6
(France) Julie Halard-Decugis (Germany) Anke Huber	1	0

== See also ==
- WTA Tier I events
- 1999 WTA Tour
- 1999 ATP Super 9
- 1999 ATP Tour
