= 2000 Cincinnati Masters – Doubles =

Doubles
- 2000 Cincinnati Masters

Final
- Champions: (Australia) Todd Woodbridge (Australia) Mark Woodforde
- Runners-up: (South Africa) Ellis Ferreira (United States) Rick Leach
- Score: 7–6^{(8–6)}, 6–4

Details
- Draw: 32 (6WC/2Q)
- Seeds: 8

Events
Singles	Doubles
- Cincinnati Open

Jonas Björkman and Byron Black were the defending champions, but Black did not compete this year. Björkman teamed up with Max Mirnyi and lost in the quarterfinals to Sébastien Lareau and Daniel Nestor.

Todd Woodbridge and Mark Woodforde won the title by defeating Ellis Ferreira and Rick Leach 7–6^{(8–6)}, 6–4 in the final.

== Seeds ==
1. (Australia) Todd Woodbridge / (Australia) Mark Woodforde (champions)
2. (United States) Alex O'Brien / (United States) Jared Palmer (first round)
3. (South Africa) Ellis Ferreira / (United States) Rick Leach (final)
4. (South Africa) David Adams / (South Africa) John-Laffnie de Jager (first round)
5. (Czech Republic) Jiří Novák / (Czech Republic) David Rikl (semifinals)
6. (South Africa) Wayne Ferreira / (Russia) Yevgeny Kafelnikov (second round, retired due to an injury on Ferreira)
7. (Czech Republic) Martin Damm / (Slovakia) Dominik Hrbatý (quarterfinals)
8. (Canada) Sébastien Lareau / (Canada) Daniel Nestor (semifinals)

== Draw ==
Key

- Q = Qualifier
- WC = Wild card
- LL = Lucky loser
- Alt = Alternate
- ITF = ITF entry
- PR = Protected ranking
- SR = Special ranking
- SE = Special exempt
- JE = Junior exempt
- JR = Junior Accelerator Programme entrant
- CO = College Accelerator Programme entrant
- NG = Next Gen Accelerator Program entrant
- w/o = Walkover
- r = Retired
- d = Defaulted

=== Finals ===
Semifinals
1	(Australia) Todd Woodbridge (Australia) Mark Woodforde	4	6	6
5	(Czech Republic) Jiří Novák (Czech Republic) David Rikl	6	3	4
3	(South Africa) Ellis Ferreira (United States) Rick Leach	6	6
8	(Canada) Sébastien Lareau (Canada) Daniel Nestor	4	4

Final
1	(Australia) Todd Woodbridge (Australia) Mark Woodforde	7^{8}	6
3	(South Africa) Ellis Ferreira (United States) Rick Leach	6^{6}	4

=== Top half ===
First round
1	(Australia) T Woodbridge (Australia) M Woodforde	6	7^{7}
(South Africa) R Koenig (Australia) D Macpherson	2	6^{5}
(United States) J Tarango (Australia) P Tramacchi	7^{8}	4	7^{7}
(Sweden) P Nyborg (Czech Republic) C Suk	6^{6}	6	6^{4}
WC	(Russia) M Safin (Belarus) V Voltchkov	4	4
(South Africa) M Barnard (South Africa) C Haggard	6	6
(Zimbabwe) W Black (Zimbabwe) K Ullyett	4	6	4
7	(Czech Republic) M Damm (Slovakia) D Hrbatý	6	3	6
4	(South Africa) D Adams (South Africa) J-L de Jager	6^{7}	7	3
(Australia) J Eagle (Australia) A Florent	7^{9}	5	6
(United States) P Galbraith (United States) B MacPhie	4	6	5
(Switzerland) R Federer (Australia) A Kratzmann	6	2	7
(Spain) T Carbonell (Argentina) M García	6	6
(Argentina) G Etlis (United States) J Waite	3	4
Q	(Italy) A Gaudenzi (Switzerland) M Rosset	6	3	4
5	(Czech Republic) J Novák (Czech Republic) D Rikl	4	6	6

Second round
1	(Australia) T Woodbridge (Australia) M Woodforde	7^{7}	6
(United States) J Tarango (Australia) P Tramacchi	6^{5}	1
(South Africa) M Barnard (South Africa) C Haggard	4	6	3
7	(Czech Republic) M Damm (Slovakia) D Hrbatý	6	3	6
(Australia) J Eagle (Australia) A Florent	4	6^{5}
(Switzerland) R Federer (Australia) A Kratzmann	6	7^{7}
(Spain) T Carbonell (Argentina) M García	5	4
5	(Czech Republic) J Novák (Czech Republic) D Rikl	7	6

Quarterfinals
1	(Australia) T Woodbridge (Australia) M Woodforde	6	6
7	(Czech Republic) M Damm (Slovakia) D Hrbatý	1	4
(Switzerland) R Federer (Australia) A Kratzmann	5	2
5	(Czech Republic) J Novák (Czech Republic) D Rikl	7	6

Semifinals
1	(Australia) T Woodbridge (Australia) M Woodforde	4	6	6
5	(Czech Republic) J Novák (Czech Republic) D Rikl	6	3	4

=== Bottom half ===
First round
6	(South Africa) W Ferreira (Russia) Y Kafelnikov	4	6	6
(United States) S Humphries (France) F Santoro	6	1	3
(North Macedonia) A Kitinov (Russia) A Olhovskiy	2	4
(Australia) L Hewitt (Australia) S Stolle	6	6
WC	(United States) B Bryan (United States) M Bryan	3	6	2
WC	(Brazil) G Kuerten (United States) C Woodruff	6	3	6
(United States) D Johnson (South Africa) P Norval	6	2	1
3	(South Africa) E Ferreira (United States) R Leach	4	6	6
8	(Canada) S Lareau (Canada) D Nestor	6	7^{7}
WC	(Spain) À Corretja (Spain) A Costa	2	6^{4}
(India) M Bhupathi (The Bahamas) M Knowles	6	4	2
WC	(Sweden) T Johansson (Sweden) M Norman	2	6	6
WC	(Germany) N Kiefer (Ecuador) N Lapentti	1	6^{5}
(Sweden) J Björkman (Belarus) M Mirnyi	6	7^{7}
Q	(South Africa) N Godwin (Australia) M Hill	6^{6}	7^{7}	6
2	(United States) A O'Brien (United States) J Palmer	7^{8}	6^{5}	2

Second round
6	(South Africa) W Ferreira (Russia) Y Kafelnikov	6	2	0^{r}
(Australia) L Hewitt (Australia) S Stolle	4	6	4
WC	(Brazil) G Kuerten (United States) C Woodruff	6^{6}	4
3	(South Africa) E Ferreira (United States) R Leach	7^{8}	6
8	(Canada) S Lareau (Canada) D Nestor	7^{7}	3	6
WC	(Sweden) T Johansson (Sweden) M Norman	6^{4}	6	3
(Sweden) J Björkman (Belarus) M Mirnyi	6	7^{7}
(South Africa) N Godwin (Australia) M Hill	3	6^{4}

Quarterfinals
(Australia) L Hewitt (Australia) S Stolle	6	4	3
3	(South Africa) E Ferreira (United States) R Leach	3	6	6
8	(Canada) S Lareau (Canada) D Nestor	6	6
(Sweden) J Björkman (Belarus) M Mirnyi	4	4

Semifinals
3	(South Africa) E Ferreira (United States) R Leach	6	6
8	(Canada) S Lareau (Canada) D Nestor	4	4

== Qualifying ==
=== Qualifying seeds ===
1. (South Africa) Neville Godwin / (Australia) Michael Hill (qualified)
2. (Australia) Paul Kilderry / (Japan) Thomas Shimada (first round)
3. (Italy) Andrea Gaudenzi / (Switzerland) Marc Rosset (qualified)
4. (Germany) Marc-Kevin Goellner / (South Africa) Marcos Ondruska (qualifying competition)

=== Qualifiers ===
1. (South Africa) Neville Godwin / (Australia) Michael Hill
2. (Italy) Andrea Gaudenzi / (Switzerland) Marc Rosset

=== Qualifying draw ===
==== First qualifier ====
First round
1	(South Africa) Neville Godwin (Australia) Michael Hill	6^{5}	7^{7}	7^{8}
WC	(United States) Taylor Dent (United States) Brandon Hawk	7^{7}	6^{5}	6^{6}
WC	(United States) Todd Martin (United States) Nathan Overholser	5	6	3
4	(Germany) Marc-Kevin Goellner (South Africa) Marcos Ondruska	7	3	6

Qualifying competition
1	(South Africa) Neville Godwin (Australia) Michael Hill	6	6
4	(Germany) Marc-Kevin Goellner (South Africa) Marcos Ondruska	3	4

==== Second qualifier ====
First round
2	(Australia) Paul Kilderry (Japan) Thomas Shimada	3	2
(United Kingdom) Kyle Spencer (United States) Jim Thomas	6	6
WC	(Morocco) Karim Alami (Morocco) Hicham Arazi	4	6^{0}
3	(Italy) Andrea Gaudenzi (Switzerland) Marc Rosset	6	7^{7}

Qualifying competition
(United Kingdom) Kyle Spencer (United States) Jim Thomas	2	7	6^{3}
3	(Italy) Andrea Gaudenzi (Switzerland) Marc Rosset	6	5	7^{7}
