= 2000 Cincinnati Masters – Singles =

Singles
- 2000 Cincinnati Masters

Final
- Champion: (Sweden) Thomas Enqvist
- Runner-up: (United Kingdom) Tim Henman
- Score: 7–6^{(7–5)}, 6–4

Details
- Draw: 64 (4WC/8Q/1LL/1SE)
- Seeds: 16

Events
Singles	Doubles
← 1999 ·	Cincinnati Open	· 2001 →

Thomas Enqvist defeated Tim Henman in the final, 7–6^{(7–5)}, 6–4 to win the singles tennis title at the 2000 Cincinnati Masters.

Pete Sampras was the defending champion, but lost in the third round to Henman.

== Seeds ==
1. (United States) Andre Agassi (second round, retired)
2. (United States) Pete Sampras (third round)
3. (Sweden) Magnus Norman (second round)
4. (Brazil) Gustavo Kuerten (semifinals)
5. (Russia) Yevgeny Kafelnikov (third round)
6. (Spain) Álex Corretja (first round)
7. (Sweden) Thomas Enqvist (champion)
8. (Russia) Marat Safin (third round)
9. (Australia) Lleyton Hewitt (first round)
10. (Ecuador) Nicolás Lapentti (first round)
11. (Germany) Nicolas Kiefer (first round)
12. (Spain) Juan Carlos Ferrero (first round)
13. (Argentina) Franco Squillari (quarterfinals)
14. (Morocco) ~~Younes El Aynaoui~~ (withdrew)
15. (United Kingdom) Tim Henman (final)
16. (Australia) Mark Philippoussis (third round)

== Draw ==
=== Key ===
- Q = Qualifier
- WC = Wild card
- LL = Lucky loser
- Alt = Alternate
- SE = Special exempt
- PR = Protected ranking
- ITF = ITF entry
- JE = Junior exempt
- w/o = Walkover
- r = Retired
- d = Defaulted
- SR = Special ranking

=== Finals ===
Quarterfinals
(Spain) Fernando Vicente	5	1
7	(Sweden) Thomas Enqvist	7	6
13	(Argentina) Franco Squillari	2	5
(France) Arnaud Clément	6	7
(United States) Todd Martin	7^{7}	3	6^{5}
4	(Brazil) Gustavo Kuerten	6^{0}	6	7^{7}
(France) Fabrice Santoro	1	4
15	(United Kingdom) Tim Henman	6	6

Semifinals
7	(Sweden) Thomas Enqvist	6	6
(France) Arnaud Clément	2	2
4	(Brazil) Gustavo Kuerten	7^{13}	3	6^{0}
15	(United Kingdom) Tim Henman	6^{11}	6	7^{7}

Final
7	(Sweden) Thomas Enqvist	7^{7}	6
15	(United Kingdom) Tim Henman	6^{5}	4

=== Top half ===
==== Section 1 ====
First round
1	(United States) A Agassi	7^{7}	6
(South Africa) W Ferreira	6^{4}	1
Q	(United States) B Bryan	6^{4}	3
(Spain) F Vicente	7^{7}	6
(Chile) M Ríos	6	6
(Switzerland) M Rosset	4	4
(France) A di Pasquale	4	2
16	(Australia) M Philippoussis	6	6
10	(Ecuador) N Lapentti	4	4
(Morocco) H Arazi	6	6
(Belarus) M Mirnyi	7^{7}	6
(Sweden) A Vinciguerra	6^{1}	4
(Australia) A Ilie	6	3	4
SE	(Israel) H Levy	3	6	6
(Romania) A Pavel	5	6	6^{7}
7	(Sweden) T Enqvist	7	2	7^{9}

Second round
1	(United States) A Agassi	6	3	0^{r}
(Spain) F Vicente	3	6	1
(Chile) M Ríos	7^{7}	4	6^{4}
16	(Australia) M Philippoussis	6^{3}	6	7^{7}
(Morocco) H Arazi	3	3
(Belarus) M Mirnyi	6	6
SE	(Israel) H Levy	4	1
7	(Sweden) T Enqvist	6	6

Third round
(Spain) F Vicente	3	7^{7}	7^{7}
16	(Australia) M Philippoussis	6	6^{3}	6^{4}
(Belarus) M Mirnyi	4	3
7	(Sweden) T Enqvist	6	6

Quarterfinals
(Spain) F Vicente	5	1
7	(Sweden) T Enqvist	7	6

==== Section 2 ====
First round
3	(Sweden) M Norman	7^{7}	7^{9}
(Argentina) J I Chela	6^{3}	6^{7}
(Czech Republic) S Doseděl	7^{13}	6
WC	(United States) M Fish	6^{11}	2
(Czech Republic) J Novák	6	6
Q	(France) L Roux	1	0
(Argentina) G Gaudio	7^{7}	5	0
13	(Argentina) F Squillari	6^{4}	7	6
12	(Spain) J C Ferrero	4	2
(France) A Clément	6	6
WC	(United States) V Spadea	6^{3}	6	2
Q	(Czech Republic) M Damm	7^{7}	3	6
(Slovakia) D Hrbatý	1	6	3
(United States) C Woodruff	6	3	6
(Netherlands) R Krajicek	3	6	3
5	(Russia) Y Kafelnikov	6	1	6

Second round
3	(Sweden) M Norman	7^{7}	3	3
(Czech Republic) S Doseděl	6^{4}	6	6
(Czech Republic) J Novák	3	4
13	(Argentina) F Squillari	6	6
(France) A Clément	7	6
Q	(Czech Republic) M Damm	5	3
(United States) C Woodruff	4	6^{3}
5	(Russia) Y Kafelnikov	6	7^{7}

Third round
(Czech Republic) S Doseděl	4	5
13	(Argentina) F Squillari	6	7
(France) A Clément	6	6
5	(Russia) Y Kafelnikov	4	1

Quarterfinals
13	(Argentina) F Squillari	2	5
(France) A Clément	6	7

=== Bottom half ===
==== Section 3 ====
First round
6	(Spain) Á Corretja	4	4
WC	(Sweden) J Björkman	6	6
(Morocco) K Alami	3	7^{7}	4
(Spain) C Moyà	6	6^{4}	6
(Netherlands) S Schalken	6	4	6
(United States) M Chang	4	6	4
(United States) T Martin	6	6
11	(Germany) N Kiefer	2	2
LL	(Italy) A Gaudenzi	6	3	6
(Spain) Á Costa	3	6	1
(Austria) S Koubek	6	6
(Sweden) T Johansson	2	3
WC	(United States) A Roddick	6^{5}	1
Q	(Italy) G Pozzi	7^{7}	6
(France) J Golmard	0	4
4	(Brazil) G Kuerten	6	6

Second round
WC	(Sweden) J Björkman	4	6	6
(Spain) C Moyà	6	2	1
(Netherlands) S Schalken	4	4
(United States) T Martin	6	6
LL	(Italy) A Gaudenzi	6	5	2
(Austria) S Koubek	2	7	6
Q	(Italy) G Pozzi	5	2
4	(Brazil) G Kuerten	7	6

Third round
WC	(Sweden) J Björkman	2	4
(United States) T Martin	6	6
(Austria) S Koubek	6	1	2
4	(Brazil) G Kuerten	1	6	6

Quarterfinals
(United States) T Martin	7^{7}	3	6^{5}
4	(Brazil) G Kuerten	6^{0}	6	7^{7}

==== Section 4 ====
First round
8	(Russia) M Safin	7	6
Q	(South Africa) N Godwin	5	3
(Switzerland) R Federer	6^{3}	6^{4}
(Spain) F Clavet	7^{7}	7^{7}
(Slovakia) K Kučera	4	4
(France) S Grosjean	6	6
(France) F Santoro	4	6	6
9	(Australia) L Hewitt	6	4	4
15	(United Kingdom) T Henman	6	5	6
Q	(Philippines) C Mamiit	3	7	2
Q	(Belarus) V Voltchkov	3	1
(Argentina) M Puerta	6	6
(United States) J Tarango	4	6	1
Q	(United States) T Dent	6	3	6
(Argentina) M Zabaleta	4	2
2	(United States) P Sampras	6	6

Second round
8	(Russia) M Safin	7^{9}	6
(Spain) F Clavet	6^{7}	3
(France) S Grosjean	2	3
(France) F Santoro	6	6
15	(United Kingdom) T Henman	6	6
(Argentina) M Puerta	1	2
Q	(United States) T Dent	6^{3}	6^{3}
2	(United States) P Sampras	7^{7}	7^{7}

Third round
8	(Russia) M Safin	1	6^{3}
(France) F Santoro	6	7^{7}
15	(United Kingdom) T Henman	6	6
2	(United States) P Sampras	3	4

Quarterfinals
(France) F Santoro	1	4
15	(United Kingdom) T Henman	6	6

== Qualifying ==
=== Qualifying seeds ===
1. (Italy) Gianluca Pozzi (qualified)
2. (Belarus) Vladimir Voltchkov (qualified)
3. (Czech Republic) Martin Damm (qualified)
4. (Switzerland) George Bastl (first round)
5. (Italy) Davide Sanguinetti (first round)
6. (Netherlands) Peter Wessels (first round)
7. (Italy) Andrea Gaudenzi (qualifying competition, lucky loser)
8. (France) Cyril Saulnier (first round)
9. (Philippines) Cecil Mamiit (qualified)
10. (United States) Bob Bryan (qualified)
11. (Slovakia) Ján Krošlák (first round)
12. (Chile) Fernando González (qualifying competition)
13. (Zimbabwe) Kevin Ullyett (first round, retired due to a knee injury)
14. (United Kingdom) Arvind Parmar (qualifying competition)
15. (France) Jean-René Lisnard (first round)
16. (South Africa) Marcos Ondruska (qualifying competition)

=== Qualifiers ===
1. (Italy) Gianluca Pozzi
2. (Belarus) Vladimir Voltchkov
3. (Czech Republic) Martin Damm
4. (South Africa) Neville Godwin
5. (United States) Taylor Dent
6. (France) Lionel Roux
7. (Philippines) Cecil Mamiit
8. (United States) Bob Bryan

=== Lucky loser ===
1. (Italy) Andrea Gaudenzi

=== Special exempt ===
1. (Israel) Harel Levy (runner-up at Toronto)

=== Qualifying draw ===
==== First qualifier ====
First round
1	(Italy) Gianluca Pozzi	7^{8}	6
(Australia) James Sekulov	6^{6}	2
(United Kingdom) Barry Cowan	7	2	1
16	(South Africa) Marcos Ondruska	5	6	6

Qualifying competition
1	(Italy) Gianluca Pozzi	7^{7}	6
16	(South Africa) Marcos Ondruska	6^{5}	2

==== Second qualifier ====
First round
2	(Belarus) Vladimir Voltchkov	6	6
(Australia) Paul Kilderry	1	3
WC	(United States) Jeff Salzenstein	7^{7}	6
15	(France) Jean-René Lisnard	6^{5}	1

Qualifying competition
2	(Belarus) Vladimir Voltchkov	6	6^{9}	6
WC	(United States) Jeff Salzenstein	4	7^{11}	2

==== Third qualifier ====
First round
3	(Czech Republic) Martin Damm	6	5	6
(United States) Alex O'Brien	4	7	3
(France) Nicolas Coutelot	6	2
13	(Zimbabwe) Kevin Ullyett	0	1^{r}

Qualifying competition
3	(Czech Republic) Martin Damm	6	6
(France) Nicolas Coutelot	3	3

==== Fourth qualifier ====
First round
4	(Switzerland) George Bastl	6^{7}	5
(South Africa) Neville Godwin	7^{9}	7
(United States) Michael Joyce	4	6	4
14	(United Kingdom) Arvind Parmar	6	4	6

Qualifying competition
(South Africa) Neville Godwin	6	6
14	(United Kingdom) Arvind Parmar	3	4

==== Fifth qualifier ====
First round
5	(Italy) Davide Sanguinetti	3	5
(United States) Taylor Dent	6	7
(Romania) Răzvan Sabău	6	3	6
11	(Slovakia) Ján Krošlák	3	6	4

Qualifying competition
(United States) Taylor Dent	7^{8}	6
(Romania) Răzvan Sabău	6^{6}	1

==== Sixth qualifier ====
First round
6	(Netherlands) Peter Wessels	5	2
(France) Lionel Roux	7	6
WC	(United States) Alex Kim	4	6	3
12	(Chile) Fernando González	6	3	6

Qualifying competition
(France) Lionel Roux	7^{8}	6
12	(Chile) Fernando González	6^{6}	2

==== Seventh qualifier ====
First round
7	(Italy) Andrea Gaudenzi	3	6	6
WC	(France) Paul-Henri Mathieu	6	4	4
(The Bahamas) Mark Knowles	2	4
9	(Philippines) Cecil Mamiit	6	6

Qualifying competition
7	(Italy) Andrea Gaudenzi	3	6	3
9	(Philippines) Cecil Mamiit	6	3	6

==== Eighth qualifier ====
First round
8	(France) Cyril Saulnier	2	6^{3}
WC	(United States) Brandon Hawk	6	7^{7}
(Australia) Scott Draper	4	4
10	(United States) Bob Bryan	6	6

Qualifying competition
WC	(United States) Brandon Hawk	3	6	1
10	(United States) Bob Bryan	6	3	6
