= 1999 Great American Insurance ATP Championships – Doubles =

Doubles
- 1999 Great American Insurance ATP Championships

Final
- Champions: (Sweden) Jonas Björkman (Zimbabwe) Byron Black
- Runners-up: (Australia) Todd Woodbridge (Australia) Mark Woodforde
- Score: 6–3, 7–6^{(8–6)}

Details
- Draw: 28 (4WC/2Q)
- Seeds: 8

Events
Singles	Doubles
← 1998 ·	Cincinnati Masters	· 2000 →

Mark Knowles and Daniel Nestor were the defending champions, but lost in semifinals to Todd Woodbridge and Mark Woodforde.

Jonas Björkman and Byron Black won the title, by defeating Woodbridge and Woodforde 6–3, 7–6^{(8–6)} in the final.

== Seeds ==
The first four seeds received a bye into the second round.

1. (India) Mahesh Bhupathi / (India) Leander Paes (second round)
2. (The Bahamas) Mark Knowles / (Canada) Daniel Nestor (semifinals)
3. (France) Olivier Delaître / (France) Fabrice Santoro (second round)
4. (Zimbabwe) Wayne Black / (Australia) Sandon Stolle (quarterfinals)
5. (South Africa) Ellis Ferreira / (United States) Rick Leach (second round)
6. (Australia) Todd Woodbridge / (Australia) Mark Woodforde (final)
7. (Russia) Yevgeny Kafelnikov / (Czech Republic) Daniel Vacek (second round)
8. (South Africa) David Adams / (South Africa) John-Laffnie de Jager (quarterfinals)

== Draw ==
=== Key ===
- Q = Qualifier
- WC = Wild card
- LL = Lucky loser
- Alt = Alternate
- SE = Special exempt
- PR = Protected ranking
- ITF = ITF entry
- JE = Junior exempt
- w/o = Walkover
- r = Retired
- d = Defaulted
- SR = Special ranking

=== Finals ===
Semifinals
(Australia) Andrew Florent (Australia) David Macpherson	2	2
(Sweden) Jonas Björkman (Zimbabwe) Byron Black	6	6
6	(Australia) Todd Woodbridge (Australia) Mark Woodforde	7	6
2	(The Bahamas) Mark Knowles (Canada) Daniel Nestor	5	3

Final
(Sweden) Jonas Björkman (Zimbabwe) Byron Black	6	7^{8}
6	(Australia) Todd Woodbridge (Australia) Mark Woodforde	3	6^{6}

=== Top half ===
First round
(Australia) A Florent (Australia) D Macpherson	6	6
WC	(Spain) C Moyá (Russia) M Safin	1	2
(United States) D Johnson (Czech Republic) C Suk	4	6	6
(United Kingdom) N Broad (Russia) A Olhovskiy	6	3	4
(Australia) W Arthurs (Australia) A Kratzmann	6^{0}	5
8	(South Africa) D Adams (South Africa) JL de Jager	7^{7}	7
(Canada) S Lareau (United States) A O'Brien	6	3	6
(South Africa) P Norval (South Africa) K Ullyett	1	6	4
(United States) R Reneberg (United States) J Stark	3	2
(Sweden) J Björkman (Zimbabwe) B Black	6	6
(South Africa) C Haggard (Sweden) P Nyborg	3	4
5	(South Africa) E Ferreira (United States) R Leach	6	6

Second round
1	(India) M Bhupathi (India) L Paes	6	3	1
(Australia) A Florent (Australia) D Macpherson	3	6	6
(United States) D Johnson (Czech Republic) C Suk	3	7	4
8	(South Africa) D Adams (South Africa) JL de Jager	6	5	6
4	(Zimbabwe) W Black (Australia) S Stolle	3	6	6
(Canada) S Lareau (United States) A O'Brien	6	1	4
(Sweden) J Björkman (Zimbabwe) B Black	7^{7}	7^{7}
5	(South Africa) E Ferreira (United States) R Leach	6^{4}	6^{5}

Quarterfinals
(Australia) A Florent (Australia) D Macpherson	3	6	6
8	(South Africa) D Adams (South Africa) JL de Jager	6	4	4
4	(Zimbabwe) W Black (Australia) S Stolle	3	6^{7}
(Sweden) J Björkman (Zimbabwe) B Black	6	7^{9}

Semifinals
(Australia) A Florent (Australia) D Macpherson	2	2
(Sweden) J Björkman (Zimbabwe) B Black	6	6

=== Bottom half ===
First round
6	(Australia) T Woodbridge (Australia) M Woodforde	6	6
WC	(United States) JM Gambill (United States) C Woodruff	4	4
WC	(Brazil) G Kuerten (Ecuador) N Lapentti	6	4	6
(Czech Republic) M Damm (Belarus) M Mirnyi	2	6	4
Q	(United States) B Coupe (South Africa) R Koenig	6	6
(Czech Republic) J Novák (Czech Republic) D Rikl	1	3
7	(Russia) Y Kafelnikov (Czech Republic) D Vacek	6^{6}	6	6
(United States) J Gimelstob (United States) J Grabb	7^{8}	4	4
(United States) J Palmer (Germany) D Prinosil	5	7	7
(Argentina) P Albano (Croatia) G Ivanišević	7	5	5
WC	(United States) B Bryan (United States) M Bryan	7^{7}	4	5
Q	(North Macedonia) A Kitinov (United States) J Waite	6^{2}	6	7

Second round
6	(Australia) T Woodbridge (Australia) M Woodforde	6	6
WC	(Brazil) G Kuerten (Ecuador) N Lapentti	3	0
Q	(United States) B Coupe (South Africa) R Koenig	6	6
3	(France) O Delaître (France) F Santoro	3	4
7	(Russia) Y Kafelnikov (Czech Republic) D Vacek	6	6^{6}	6^{5}
(United States) J Palmer (Germany) D Prinosil	1	7^{8}	7^{7}
Q	(North Macedonia) A Kitinov (United States) J Waite	4	6^{2}
2	(The Bahamas) M Knowles (Canada) D Nestor	6	7^{7}

Quarterfinals
6	(Australia) T Woodbridge (Australia) M Woodforde	6	2	7^{7}
Q	(United States) B Coupe (South Africa) R Koenig	1	6	6^{3}
(United States) J Palmer (Germany) D Prinosil	6^{3}	6	3
2	(The Bahamas) M Knowles (Canada) D Nestor	7^{7}	2	6

Semifinals
6	(Australia) T Woodbridge (Australia) M Woodforde	7	6
2	(The Bahamas) M Knowles (Canada) D Nestor	5	3

== Qualifying ==
=== Qualifying seeds ===
1. (United States) Brandon Coupe / (South Africa) Robbie Koenig (qualified)
2. (North Macedonia) Aleksandar Kitinov / (United States) Jack Waite (qualified)
3. (South Africa) Marius Barnard / (South Africa) Brent Haygarth (first round)
4. (Australia) Michael Hill / (United States) Scott Humphries (first round)

=== Qualifiers ===
1. (United States) Brandon Coupe / (South Africa) Robbie Koenig
2. (North Macedonia) Aleksandar Kitinov / (United States) Jack Waite

=== Qualifying draw ===
==== First qualifier ====
First round
1	(United States) Brandon Coupe (South Africa) Robbie Koenig	6	6
WC	(United States) Keith Jones (United States) Dan Kronauge	3	4
WC	(United States) Paul Goldstein (Philippines) Cecil Mamiit	5	6	6
3	(South Africa) Marius Barnard (South Africa) Brent Haygarth	7	4	0

Qualifying competition
1	(United States) Brandon Coupe (South Africa) Robbie Koenig	6	6
WC	(United States) Paul Goldstein (Philippines) Cecil Mamiit	4	2

==== Second qualifier ====
First round
2	(North Macedonia) Aleksandar Kitinov (United States) Jack Waite	6	6
(United States) T. J. Middleton (Australia) Michael Tebbutt	1	4
WC	(France) Arnaud Clément (France) Sébastien Grosjean	0	6	6
4	(Australia) Michael Hill (United States) Scott Humphries	6	3	2

Qualifying competition
2	(North Macedonia) Aleksandar Kitinov (United States) Jack Waite	6	5	6
WC	(France) Arnaud Clément (France) Sébastien Grosjean	4	7	2
