= 2000 du Maurier Open – Men's doubles =

Men's doubles
- 2000 du Maurier Open

Final
- Champions: (Canada) Sébastien Lareau (Canada) Daniel Nestor
- Runners-up: (Australia) Joshua Eagle (Australia) Andrew Florent
- Score: 6–3, 7–6^{(7–3)}

Details
- Draw: 32
- Seeds: 8

Events
Singles	men	women
Doubles	men	women
- du Maurier Open

The 2000 du Maurier Open men's doubles was the men's doubles event of the one hundred and eleventh edition of the Canadian Open; a WTA Tier I tournament and the most prestigious men's tennis tournament held in Canada. Jonas Björkman and Patrick Rafter were the defending champions, but Rafter chose not to participate, and only Bjorkman competed that year. Bjorkman partnered with Max Mirnyi, but lost in the semifinals to Joshua Eagle and Andrew Florent. Sébastien Lareau and Daniel Nestor won in the final 6–3, 7–6^{(7–3)}, against Joshua Eagle and Andrew Florent.

== Seeds ==
1. (United States) Alex O'Brien / (United States) Jared Palmer (second round)
2. (South Africa) Ellis Ferreira / (United States) Rick Leach (quarterfinals)
3. (South Africa) David Adams / (South Africa) John-Laffnie de Jager (quarterfinals)
4. (Czech Republic) Jiří Novák / (Czech Republic) David Rikl (first round)
5. (South Africa) Wayne Ferreira / (Russia) Yevgeny Kafelnikov (second round)
6. (Canada) Sébastien Lareau / (Canada) Daniel Nestor (champions)
7. (United States) Donald Johnson / (South Africa) Piet Norval (semifinals)
8. (Sweden) Jonas Björkman / (Belarus) Max Mirnyi (semifinals)

== Draw ==
Key

- Q = Qualifier
- WC = Wild card
- LL = Lucky loser
- Alt = Alternate
- ITF = ITF entry
- PR = Protected ranking
- SR = Special ranking
- SE = Special exempt
- JE = Junior exempt
- JR = Junior Accelerator Programme entrant
- CO = College Accelerator Programme entrant
- NG = Next Gen Accelerator Program entrant
- w/o = Walkover
- r = Retired
- d = Defaulted

=== Finals ===
Semifinals
7	(United States) Donald Johnson (South Africa) Piet Norval	5	4
6	(Canada) Sébastien Lareau (Canada) Daniel Nestor	7	6
(Australia) Joshua Eagle (Australia) Andrew Florent	7	6
8	(Sweden) Jonas Björkman (Belarus) Max Mirnyi	6^{5}	1

Final
6	(Canada) Sébastien Lareau (Canada) Daniel Nestor	6	7
(Australia) Joshua Eagle (Australia) Andrew Florent	3	6^{3}

=== Top half ===
First round
1	(United States) A O'Brien (United States) J Palmer	6	7
(Switzerland) R Federer (Australia) A Kratzmann	4	6^{1}
WC	(United States) T Martin (United States) C Woodruff	4	6	7
LL	(Israel) H Levy (United States) C Mamiit	6	3	5
(Argentina) M García (Argentina) M Puerta	7	3	6
(South Africa) M Barnard (South Africa) C Haggard	6^{4}	6	3
(South Africa) N Godwin (South Africa) B Haygarth	4	3
7	(United States) D Johnson (South Africa) P Norval	6	6
3	(South Africa) D Adams (South Africa) J-L de Jager	4	6	7
(Czech Republic) M Damm (Czech Republic) C Suk	6	4	6^{0}
(Australia) P Kilderry (Australia) P Tramacchi	6	6
Q	(United Kingdom) B Cowan (United Kingdom) A Parmar	1	3
(United States) J Stark (South Africa) K Ullyett	7	6
WC	(Canada) F Niemeyer (Canada) J Turek	6^{7}	4
(France) M Llodra (Romania) A Pavel	4	7	6^{5}
6	(Canada) S Lareau (Canada) D Nestor	6	6^{3}	7

Second round
1	(United States) A O'Brien (United States) J Palmer	3	4
WC	(United States) T Martin (United States) C Woodruff	6	6
(Argentina) M García (Argentina) M Puerta	4	3
7	(United States) D Johnson (South Africa) P Norval	6	6
3	(South Africa) D Adams (South Africa) J-L de Jager	6	1	6
(Australia) P Kilderry (Australia) P Tramacchi	3	6	3
(United States) J Stark (South Africa) K Ullyett	7	6^{4}	6^{10}
6	(Canada) S Lareau (Canada) D Nestor	6^{7}	7	7

Quarterfinals
WC	(United States) T Martin (United States) C Woodruff	3	4
7	(United States) D Johnson (South Africa) P Norval	6	6
3	(South Africa) D Adams (South Africa) J-L de Jager	2	6^{11}
6	(Canada) S Lareau (Canada) D Nestor	6	7

Semifinals
7	(United States) D Johnson (South Africa) P Norval	5	4
6	(Canada) S Lareau (Canada) D Nestor	7	6

=== Bottom half ===
First round
5	(South Africa) W Ferreira (Russia) Y Kafelnikov	7	0	7
Q	(Morocco) K Alami (Morocco) H Arazi	6^{5}	6	5
(Australia) J Eagle (Australia) A Florent	4	7	7
WC	(Brazil) G Kuerten (Sweden) M Norman	6	6^{5}	6^{4}
WC	(Canada) F Dancevic (Canada) P Gubenco	2	4
WC	(Germany) N Kiefer (Canada) J Robichaud	6	6
(India) M Bhupathi (The Bahamas) M Knowles	6	6
4	(Czech Republic) J Novák (Czech Republic) D Rikl	2	3
8	(Sweden) J Björkman (Belarus) M Mirnyi	6	6
LL	(France) L Roux (France) C Saulnier	3	4
(South Africa) R Koenig (Australia) D Macpherson	3	6	6
WC	(Canada) D Abelson (Canada) S Larose	6	1	4
(United States) J Tarango (United States) J Waite	4	4
(North Macedonia) A Kitinov (Russia) A Olhovskiy	6	6
(France) A Clément (France) S Grosjean	3	2
2	(South Africa) E Ferreira (United States) R Leach	6	6

Second round
1	(South Africa) W Ferreira (Russia) Y Kafelnikov	6^{2}	7	3
(Australia) J Eagle (Australia) A Florent	7	6^{2}	6
WC	(Germany) N Kiefer (Canada) J Robichaud	6^{3}	3
(India) M Bhupathi (The Bahamas) M Knowles	7	6
8	(Sweden) J Björkman (Belarus) M Mirnyi	6	2	6
(South Africa) R Koenig (Australia) D Macpherson	3	6	4
(North Macedonia) A Kitinov (Russia) A Olhovskiy	3	6^{5}
2	(South Africa) E Ferreira (United States) R Leach	6	7

Quarterfinals
(Australia) J Eagle (Australia) A Florent	7	5	6
(India) M Bhupathi (The Bahamas) M Knowles	6^{2}	7	3
8	(Sweden) J Björkman (Belarus) M Mirnyi	7	6
2	(South Africa) E Ferreira (United States) R Leach	6^{3}	4

Semifinals
(Australia) J Eagle (Australia) A Florent	7	6
8	(Sweden) J Björkman (Belarus) M Mirnyi	6^{5}	1
