= 2000 du Maurier Open – Women's doubles =

Women's doubles
- 2000 du Maurier Open

Final
- Champions: (Switzerland) Martina Hingis (France) Nathalie Tauziat
- Runners-up: (France) Julie Halard-Decugis (Japan) Ai Sugiyama
- Score: 6–3, 3–6, 6–4

Details
- Draw: 28
- Seeds: 8

Events
Singles	men	women
Doubles	men	women
- Canadian Open

The 2000 du Maurier Open women's doubles was the doubles event of the ninety-ninth women's edition of the Canadian Open; a WTA Tier I tournament and the most prestigious women's tennis tournament held in Canada. Jana Novotná and Mary Pierce were the reigning champions, but Novotná retired from professional tennis in 1999 and Pierce did not compete at the tournament. Martina Hingis and Nathalie Tauziat won the title by defeating Julie Halard-Decugis and Ai Sugiyama 6–3, 3–6, 6–4 in the final. It was the 11th title for Hingis and the 21st title for Tauziat in their respective doubles careers.

== Seeds ==
The first four seeds received a bye into the second round.

1. (France) Julie Halard-Decugis / (Japan) Ai Sugiyama (final)
2. (Switzerland) Martina Hingis / (France) Nathalie Tauziat (champions)
3. (United States) Chanda Rubin / (France) Sandrine Testud (semifinals)
4. (Spain) Virginia Ruano Pascual / (Argentina) Paola Suárez (second round)
5. (United States) Lindsay Davenport / (Russia) Anna Kournikova (quarterfinals, withdrew)
6. (Spain) Conchita Martínez / (Spain) Arantxa Sánchez Vicario (first round)
7. (Germany) Anke Huber / (Austria) Barbara Schett (quarterfinals)
8. (Zimbabwe) Cara Black / (Russia) Elena Likhovtseva (quarterfinals)

== Draw ==
Key

- Q = Qualifier
- WC = Wild card
- LL = Lucky loser
- Alt = Alternate
- ITF = ITF entry
- PR = Protected ranking
- SR = Special ranking
- SE = Special exempt
- JE = Junior exempt
- JR = Junior Accelerator Programme entrant
- CO = College Accelerator Programme entrant
- NG = Next Gen Accelerator Program entrant
- w/o = Walkover
- r = Retired
- d = Defaulted

=== Finals ===
Semifinals
1	(France) Julie Halard-Decugis (Japan) Ai Sugiyama	5	6	6
3	(United States) Chanda Rubin (France) Sandrine Testud	7	2	1
(United States) Kimberly Po (France) Anne-Gaëlle Sidot	1	3
2	(Switzerland) Martina Hingis (France) Nathalie Tauziat	6	6

Final
1	(France) Julie Halard-Decugis (Japan) Ai Sugiyama	3	6	4
2	(Switzerland) Martina Hingis (France) Nathalie Tauziat	6	3	6

=== Top half ===
First round
(Australia) L McShea (Kazakhstan) I Selyutina	7	6
(South Africa) M de Swardt (Netherlands) C Vis	5	3
(South Africa) L Horn (Argentina) L Montalvo	6	6
WC	(Canada) M Drake (Canada) V Webb	4	4
(United States) N Arendt (Netherlands) M Bollegraf	3	6	2
5	(United States) L Davenport (Russia) A Kournikova	6	3	6
(Sweden) Å Carlsson (Canada) S Jeyaseelan	5	6	1
(United States) J Capriati (Belgium) D van Roost	7	0	6
(United States) E deLone (Switzerland) P Schnyder	6	2	2
(Netherlands) K Boogert (Netherlands) M Oremans	2	6	6
(Belgium) S Appelmans (Argentina) P Tarabini	1	3
8	(Zimbabwe) C Black (Russia) E Likhovtseva	6	6

Second round
1	(France) J Halard-Decugis (Japan) A Sugiyama	6	6
(Australia) L McShea (Kazakhstan) I Selyutina	1	3
(South Africa) L Horn (Argentina) L Montalvo	6	4	2
5	(United States) L Davenport (Russia) A Kournikova	2	6	6
3	(United States) C Rubin (France) S Testud	7^{8}	6
(United States) J Capriati (Belgium) D van Roost	6^{6}	0
(Netherlands) K Boogert (Netherlands) M Oremans	3	6	5
8	(Zimbabwe) C Black (Russia) E Likhovtseva	6	4	7

Quarterfinals
1	(France) J Halard-Decugis (Japan) A Sugiyama	w/o
5	(United States) L Davenport (Russia) A Kournikova
3	(United States) C Rubin (France) S Testud	6	6
8	(Zimbabwe) C Black (Russia) E Likhovtseva	4	2

Semifinals
1	(France) J Halard-Decugis (Japan) A Sugiyama	5	6	6
3	(United States) C Rubin (France) S Testud	7	2	1

=== Bottom half ===
First round
6	(Spain) C Martínez (Spain) A Sánchez Vicario	5	4
(Romania) C Cristea (Romania) R Dragomir	7	6
(South Africa) A Coetzer (United States) L McNeil	2	7^{7}	7^{7}
(Australia) J Dokic (Australia) R Stubbs	6	6^{4}	6^{2}
Q	(Italy) T Garbin (Slovakia) J Husárová	2	4
(United States) K Po (France) AG Sidot	6	6
7	(Germany) A Huber (Austria) B Schett	6	6
(France) A Cocheteux (France) N Dechy	3	3
(Spain) M Serna (United States) M Shaughnessy	6	3	6
(United States) A Frazier (United States) K Schlukebir	1	6	3
WC	(Canada) R Kolbovic (Canada) MÈ Pelletier	2	6	3
(Italy) R Grande (Slovakia) K Habšudová	6	4	6

Second round
(Romania) C Cristea (Romania) R Dragomir	1	2
(South Africa) A Coetzer (United States) L McNeil	6	6
(United States) K Po (France) AG Sidot	7	6^{4}	6
4	(Spain) V Ruano Pascual (Argentina) P Suárez	5	7^{7}	4
7	(Germany) A Huber (Austria) B Schett	3	6	7
(Spain) M Serna (United States) M Shaughnessy	6	3	5
(Italy) R Grande (Slovakia) K Habšudová	3	3
2	(Switzerland) M Hingis (France) N Tauziat	6	6

Quarterfinals
(South Africa) A Coetzer (United States) L McNeil	4	6^{4}
(United States) K Po (France) AG Sidot	6	7^{7}
7	(Germany) A Huber (Austria) B Schett	1	4
2	(Switzerland) M Hingis (France) N Tauziat	6	6

Semifinals
(United States) K Po (France) AG Sidot	1	3
2	(Switzerland) M Hingis (France) N Tauziat	6	6
