= 2000 Swisscom Challenge – Doubles =

Doubles
- 2000 Swisscom Challenge

Final
- Champions: (Switzerland) Martina Hingis (Russia) Anna Kournikova
- Runners-up: (United States) Kimberly Po (France) Anne-Gaëlle Sidot
- Score: 6–3, 6–4

Details
- Draw: 16
- Seeds: 4

Events
Singles	Doubles
← 1999 ·	Swisscom Challenge	· 2001 →

Lisa Raymond and Rennae Stubbs were the defending champions, but did not compete this year.

Martina Hingis and Anna Kournikova won the title by defeating Kimberly Po and Anne-Gaëlle Sidot 6–3, 6–4 in the final.

== Seeds ==
1. (Japan) Ai Sugiyama / (France) Nathalie Tauziat (first round)
2. (Switzerland) Martina Hingis / (Russia) Anna Kournikova (champions)
3. (Zimbabwe) Cara Black / (Russia) Elena Likhovtseva (quarterfinals)
4. (United States) Chanda Rubin / (Austria) Barbara Schett (quarterfinals)

== Draws ==
Key

- Q = Qualifier
- WC = Wild card
- LL = Lucky loser
- Alt = Alternate
- ITF = ITF entry
- PR = Protected ranking
- SR = Special ranking
- SE = Special exempt
- JE = Junior exempt
- JR = Junior Accelerator Programme entrant
- CO = College Accelerator Programme entrant
- NG = Next Gen Accelerator Program entrant
- w/o = Walkover
- r = Retired
- d = Defaulted

=== Draw ===
First round
1	(Japan) A Sugiyama (France) N Tauziat	4	6	4
(United States) K Po (France) A-G Sidot	6	4	6
(Belgium) S Appelmans (Romania) C Cristea	1	2
(Australia) J Dokic (Federal Republic of Yugoslavia) S Načuk	6	6
4	(United States) C Rubin (Austria) B Schett	3	6	6
(Belgium) E Callens (Belgium) D van Roost	6	1	4
(Slovakia) K Habšudová (Canada) S Jeyaseelan	6	1	6
(South Africa) A Coetzer (Netherlands) C Vis	4	6	2
Q	(Germany) A Glass (Germany) B Lamade	6	6^{3}	6
(Romania) R Dragomir (Italy) S Farina Elia	1	7^{7}	0
(United States) N Arendt (Netherlands) M Bollegraf	4	7	4
3	(Zimbabwe) C Black (Russia) E Likhovtseva	6	5	6
(Bulgaria) M Maleeva (Switzerland) P Schnyder	1	6	3
WC	(Russia) L Krasnoroutskaya (Russia) A Myskina	6	0	6
(Netherlands) A Hopmans (Slovenia) T Pisnik	3	4
2	(Switzerland) M Hingis (Russia) A Kournikova	6	6

Quarterfinals
(United States) K Po (France) A-G Sidot	6	3	7
(Australia) J Dokic (Federal Republic of Yugoslavia) S Načuk	4	6	5
4	(United States) C Rubin (Austria) B Schett	2	6	2
(Slovakia) K Habšudová (Canada) S Jeyaseelan	6	0	6
Q	(Germany) A Glass (Germany) B Lamade	6	2	7^{7}
3	(Zimbabwe) C Black (Russia) E Likhovtseva	4	6	6^{4}
WC	(Russia) L Krasnoroutskaya (Russia) A Myskina	1	1
2	(Switzerland) M Hingis (Russia) A Kournikova	6	6

Semifinals
(United States) K Po (France) A-G Sidot	7^{7}	6
(Slovakia) K Habšudová (Canada) S Jeyaseelan	6^{2}	3
Q	(Germany) A Glass (Germany) B Lamade	4	0
2	(Switzerland) M Hingis (Russia) A Kournikova	6	6

Final
(United States) K Po (France) A-G Sidot	3	4
2	(Switzerland) M Hingis (Russia) A Kournikova	6	6
