= 1999 Swisscom Challenge =

- Date: 10–17 October
- Edition: 16th
- Category: Tier I
- Draw: 28S / 16D
- Prize money: $1,050,000
- Surface: Hard / indoor
- Location: Zurich, Switzerland
- Venue: Schluefweg

Champions

Singles
- (United States) Venus Williams

Doubles
- (United States) Lisa Raymond / (Australia) Rennae Stubbs
← 1998 ·	Swisscom Challenge	· 2000 →

The 1999 Swisscom Challenge was a women's tennis tournament played on indoor hard courts at the Schluefweg in Zurich, Switzerland that was part of Tier I of the 1999 WTA Tour. It was the 16th edition of the tournament and was held from 10 October until 17 October 1999. Second-seeded Venus Williams won the singles title.

== Finals ==
=== Singles ===
(United States) Venus Williams defeated (Switzerland) Martina Hingis 6–3, 6–4

- It was Williams' 6th title of the year and the 9th of her career.

=== Doubles ===
(United States) Lisa Raymond / (Australia) Rennae Stubbs defeated (France) Nathalie Tauziat / (Belarus) Natasha Zvereva 6–2, 6–2

- It was Raymond's 3rd title of the year and the 12th of her career. It was also Stubbs' 3rd title of the year, but the 17th of her career.

== Entrants ==
=== Seeds ===
- Ranking date 4 October 1999

Country	Player	Rank	Seed
SUI	Martina Hingis	1	1
USA	Venus Williams	3	2
FRA	Mary Pierce	6	3
RSA	Amanda Coetzer	7	4
AUT	Barbara Schett	8	5
FRA	Julie Halard-Decugis	9	6
BEL	Dominique Van Roost	10	7
FRA	Nathalie Tauziat	11	8

=== Other entrants ===
The following players received wildcards into the singles main draw:

- (United States) Lisa Raymond
- (Netherlands) Miriam Oremans
- (United States) Jennifer Capriati

The following players received wildcards into the doubles main draw:

- (Canada) Maureen Drake / (Switzerland) Miroslava Vavrinec

The following players received entry from the qualifying draw:

- (Russia) Tatiana Panova
- (United States) Corina Morariu
- (Russia) Elena Dementieva
- (Spain) Magüi Serna
- (Croatia) Jelena Kostanić / (United States) Tara Snyder

The following player received entry as a lucky loser:

- (Slovakia) Henrieta Nagyová
