= 1999 Great American Insurance ATP Championships =

- Date: August 9–16
- Edition: 98th
- Category: ATP Super 9
- Draw: 56S / 28D
- Prize money: $2,200,000
- Surface: Clay
- Location: Mason, U.S.

Champions

Singles
- (United States) Pete Sampras

Doubles
- (Sweden) Jonas Björkman / (Zimbabwe) Byron Black
- Cincinnati Masters

The 1999 Great American Insurance ATP Championships, also known as the Cincinnati Open, was a men's tennis tournament played on outdoor Clay courts. It was the 98th edition of the tournament previously known as the Thriftway ATP Championships, and was part of the ATP Super 9 of the 1999 ATP Tour. It took place in Mason, Ohio, USA, from August 9 through August 16, 1999. The singles title was won by first-seeded Pete Sampras.

The tournament had previously appeared on the Tier III of the WTA Tour but no event was held from 1989 to 2003.

== Finals ==
=== Singles ===
(United States) Pete Sampras defeated (Australia) Patrick Rafter, 7–6^{(9–7)}, 6–3

- It was Pete Sampras' 4th title of the year and his 60th overall. It was his 1st Masters title of the year and his 10th overall. It was his 2nd title at the event after winning in 1992 and 1997.

=== Doubles ===
(Sweden) Jonas Björkman / (Zimbabwe) Byron Black defeated (Australia) Todd Woodbridge / (Australia) Mark Woodforde 6–3, 7–6^{(8–6)}
