= 2000 du Maurier Open – Women's singles =

Women's singles
- 2000 du Maurier Open

Final
- Champion: (Switzerland) Martina Hingis
- Runner-up: (United States) Serena Williams
- Score: 0–6, 6–3, 3–0 retired

Details
- Draw: 56
- Seeds: 16

Events
Singles	men	women
Doubles	men	women
- Canadian Open

Defending champion Martina Hingis won the women's singles tennis title at the 2000 Canadian Open after Serena Williams retired from the final due to a left foot injury, with the score at 0–6, 6–3, 3–0.

== Seeds ==
The top eight seeds received a bye into the second round.

1. (Switzerland) Martina Hingis (champion)
2. (United States) Lindsay Davenport (third round, retired due to a left ankle injury)
3. (Spain) Conchita Martínez (semifinals)
4. (United States) Serena Williams (final, retired due to a left foot injury)
5. (France) Nathalie Tauziat (second round)
6. (Germany) Anke Huber (third round)
7. (Spain) Arantxa Sánchez Vicario (semifinals)
8. (France) Sandrine Testud (quarterfinals)
9. (South Africa) Amanda Coetzer (second round)
10. (France) Julie Halard-Decugis (third round, withdrew due to lower back pain)
11. (Russia) Anna Kournikova (third round)
12. (Belgium) Dominique Van Roost (first round)
13. (United States) Jennifer Capriati (third round)
14. (Austria) Barbara Schett (first round)
15. (United States) Chanda Rubin (third round)
16. (United States) Amy Frazier (quarterfinals)

== Draw ==
Key

- Q = Qualifier
- WC = Wild card
- LL = Lucky loser
- Alt = Alternate
- ITF = ITF entry
- PR = Protected ranking
- SR = Special ranking
- SE = Special exempt
- JE = Junior exempt
- JR = Junior Accelerator Programme entrant
- CO = College Accelerator Programme entrant
- NG = Next Gen Accelerator Program entrant
- w/o = Walkover
- r = Retired
- d = Defaulted

=== Finals ===
Quarterfinals
1	(Switzerland) Martina Hingis	6	4	6
8	(France) Sandrine Testud	4	6	3
3	(Spain) Conchita Martínez	6	6
(Luxembourg) Anne Kremer	2	4
16	(United States) Amy Frazier	0	1
4	(United States) Serena Williams	6	6
7	(Spain) Arantxa Sánchez Vicario	6	6
Q	(Bulgaria) Magdalena Maleeva	1	4

Semifinals
1	(Switzerland) Martina Hingis	6	6
3	(Spain) Conchita Martínez	3	2
4	(United States) Serena Williams	6	6
7	(Spain) Arantxa Sánchez Vicario	2	4

Final
1	(Switzerland) Martina Hingis	0	6	3
4	(United States) Serena Williams	6	3	0^{r}

=== Top half ===
==== Section 1 ====
First round
Q	(Russia) N Petrova	7	6
(United States) K Brandi	6^{5}	1
Q	(United States) S Reeves	3	3
WC	(Canada) J Nejedly	6	6
(Czech Republic) K Hrdličková	6	6
12	(Belgium) D Van Roost	4	3
15	(United States) C Rubin	6^{5}	6	6
(Argentina) P Suárez	7	2	2
(Colombia) F Zuluaga	4	1
(Russia) T Panova	6	6
(Spain) Á Montolio	1	5
(Romania) R Dragomir	6	7

Second round
1	(Switzerland) M Hingis	6	6
(Russia) N Petrova	1	3
WC	(Canada) J Nejedly	3	0
(Czech Republic) K Hrdličková	6	6
15	(United States) C Rubin	6	6
(Russia) T Panova	2	3
(Romania) R Dragomir	6	5	2
8	(France) S Testud	3	7	6

Third round
1	(Switzerland) M Hingis	6	6
(Czech Republic) K Hrdličková	1	4
15	(United States) C Rubin	4	1
8	(France) S Testud	6	6

Quarterfinals
1	(Switzerland) M Hingis	6	4	6
8	(France) S Testud	4	6	3

==== Section 2 ====
First round
Q	(United States) E deLone	4	6	1
(United States) A Miller	6	3	6
Q	(Serbia and Montenegro) S Načuk	7	6^{5}	6
(Australia) N Pratt	6^{5}	7	2
(France) A-G Sidot	6	6^{7}	3
10	(France) J Halard-Decugis	4	7	6
14	(Austria) B Schett	1	6	4
(Croatia) S Talaja	6	4	6
(France) N Dechy	6	6
(United States) A Stevenson	3	4
(Russia) A Myskina	4	1
(Luxembourg) A Kremer	6	6

Second round
3	(Spain) C Martínez	6	6
(United States) A Miller	0	1
Q	(Serbia and Montenegro) S Načuk	3	6^{3}
10	(France) J Halard-Decugis	6	7
(Croatia) S Talaja	7	6
(France) N Dechy	5	4
(Luxembourg) A Kremer	6	6
5	(France) N Tauziat	4	1

Third round
3	(Spain) C Martínez	w/o
10	(France) J Halard-Decugis
(Croatia) S Talaja	5	3
(Luxembourg) A Kremer	7	6

Quarterfinals
3	(Spain) C Martínez	6	6
(Luxembourg) A Kremer	2	4

=== Bottom half ===
==== Section 3 ====
First round
(Spain) M Serna	2	2
(France) S Pitkowski	6	6
(Spain) G León García	4	6	6
(Japan) A Sugiyama	6	0	1
(Russia) E Dementieva	4	2
16	(United States) A Frazier	6	6
11	(Russia) A Kournikova	6	7
(Zimbabwe) C Black	3	6^{4}
(Australia) J Dokić	7	4	6^{5}
(Belgium) S Appelmans	6^{6}	6	7
(Switzerland) P Schnyder	7	6
(Russia) E Likhovtseva	5	3

Second round
6	(Germany) A Huber	4	6	6
(France) S Pitkowski	6	1	4
(Spain) G León García	6	2	3
16	(United States) A Frazier	3	6	6
11	(Russia) A Kournikova	6	6
(Belgium) S Appelmans	4	3
(Switzerland) P Schnyder	1	2
4	(United States) S Williams	6	6

Third round
6	(Germany) A Huber	4	6	4
16	(United States) A Frazier	6	3	6
11	(Russia) A Kournikova	3	2
4	(United States) S Williams	6	6

Quarterfinals
16	(United States) A Frazier	0	1
4	(United States) S Williams	6	6

==== Section 4 ====
First round
Q	(Slovakia) H Nagyová	2	7	6
(Czech Republic) D Chládková	6	5	3
Q	(Spain) V Ruano Pascual	6	6
WC	(Canada) V Webb	4	4
(Italy) T Garbin	6^{5}	6^{1}
13	(United States) J Capriati	7	7
9	(South Africa) A Coetzer	6	6
(Thailand) T Tanasugarn	2	2
WC	(Canada) S Jeyaseelan	1	0
Q	(Bulgaria) M Maleeva	6	6
(Sweden) Å Carlsson	2	6	3
Q	(Belgium) J Henin	6	4	6

Second round
7	(Spain) A Sánchez Vicario	6	6
Q	(Slovakia) H Nagyová	4	1
Q	(Spain) V Ruano Pascual	6	1	4
13	(United States) J Capriati	3	6	6
9	(South Africa) A Coetzer	3	2
Q	(Bulgaria) M Maleeva	6	6
Q	(Belgium) J Henin	6	6^{2}	2
2	(United States) L Davenport	3	7	6

Third round
7	(Spain) A Sánchez Vicario	6	7
13	(United States) J Capriati	4	5
Q	(Bulgaria) M Maleeva	4
2	(United States) L Davenport	3	r

Quarterfinals
7	(Spain) A Sánchez Vicario	6	6
Q	(Bulgaria) M Maleeva	1	4
