= 1999 Great American Insurance ATP Championships – Singles =

Singles
- 1999 Great American Insurance ATP Championships

Final
- Champion: (United States) Pete Sampras
- Runner-up: (Australia) Patrick Rafter
- Score: 7–6^{(9–7)}, 6–3

Details
- Draw: 56 (5WC/7Q)
- Seeds: 16

Events
Singles	Doubles
← 1998 ·	Cincinnati Open	· 2000 →

Pete Sampras defeated the defending champion Patrick Rafter in a rematch of the previous year's final, 7–6^{(9–7)}, 6–3 to win the singles tennis title at the 1999 Cincinnati Masters.

With the win, Sampras reached his fourth title in this season, after previously winning at London (Queen's), Wimbledon and Los Angeles.

== Seeds ==
The top eight seeds received a bye to the second round.

1. (United States) Pete Sampras (champion)
2. (Australia) Patrick Rafter (final)
3. (United States) Andre Agassi (semifinals)
4. (Russia) Yevgeny Kafelnikov (semifinals)
5. (United Kingdom) Tim Henman (quarterfinals)
6. (Brazil) Gustavo Kuerten (quarterfinals)
7. (Netherlands) Richard Krajicek (quarterfinals)
8. (Spain) Álex Corretja (second round)
9. (United States) Todd Martin (second round)
10. (Spain) Carlos Moyà (first round)
11. (Germany) Tommy Haas (third round)
12. (Germany) Nicolas Kiefer (third round)
13. (Sweden) Thomas Enqvist (second round)
14. (Spain) Álbert Costa (second round)
15. (Ecuador) Nicolás Lapentti (third round)
16. (Sweden) Thomas Johansson (first round, retired)

== Draw ==
=== Key ===
- Q = Qualifier
- WC = Wild card
- LL = Lucky loser
- Alt = Alternate
- SE = Special exempt
- PR = Protected ranking
- ITF = ITF entry
- JE = Junior exempt
- w/o = Walkover
- r = Retired
- d = Defaulted
- SR = Special ranking

=== Finals ===
Semifinals
1	(United States) Pete Sampras	7^{9}	6
3	(United States) Andre Agassi	6^{7}	4
4	(Russia) Yevgeny Kafelnikov	4	2
2	(Australia) Patrick Rafter	6	6

Final
1	(United States) Pete Sampras	7^{9}	6
2	(Australia) Patrick Rafter	6^{7}	3

=== Top half ===
==== Section 1 ====
First round
(Netherlands) J Siemerink	6	6
(Slovakia) J Krošlák	1	2
(Sweden) M Larsson	7^{7}	6
Q	(France) A Clément	6^{5}	0
(Germany) R Schüttler	6	3
16	(Sweden) T Johansson	4	4^{r}
9	(United States) T Martin	6	5	6
Q	(Paraguay) R Delgado	4	7	2
(United States) J Gimelstob	6	6
(Australia) J Stoltenberg	2	3
WC	(United States) R Reneberg	6^{2}	4
Q	(Croatia) I Ljubičić	7^{7}	6

Second round
1	(United States) P Sampras	7^{11}	6
(Netherlands) J Siemerink	6^{9}	4
(Sweden) M Larsson	5	6^{5}
(Germany) R Schüttler	7	7^{7}
9	(United States) T Martin	4	4
(United States) J Gimelstob	6	6
Q	(Croatia) I Ljubičić	1	3
7	(Netherlands) R Krajicek	6	6

Third round
1	(United States) P Sampras	7	7^{7}
(Germany) R Schüttler	5	6^{2}
(United States) J Gimelstob	4	2
7	(Netherlands) R Krajicek	6	6

Quarterfinals
1	(United States) P Sampras	6	6
7	(Netherlands) R Krajicek	4	2

==== Section 2 ====
First round
(France) A Di Pasquale	6	6
WC	(United States) M Washington	4	3
Q	(Germany) A Pretzsch	7^{7}	5	3
(Czech Republic) J Novák	6^{3}	7	6
(Australia) A Ilie	4	6	2
14	(Spain) Á Costa	6	3	6
11	(Germany) T Haas	7	6
WC	(Belgium) X Malisse	5	2
(Zimbabwe) B Black	6^{5}	3
(France) F Santoro	7^{7}	6
(Spain) A Martín	7^{7}	6
(Germany) D Prinosil	6^{3}	3

Second round
3	(United States) A Agassi	6	6
(France) A Di Pasquale	4	1
(Czech Republic) J Novák	7^{7}	7^{8}
14	(Spain) Á Costa	6^{3}	6^{6}
11	(Germany) T Haas	6	6^{1}	6
(France) F Santoro	0	7^{7}	3
(Spain) A Martín	2	3
6	(Brazil) G Kuerten	6	6

Third round
3	(United States) A Agassi	7^{7}	7^{7}
(Czech Republic) J Novák	6^{3}	6^{5}
11	(Germany) T Haas	5	5
6	(Brazil) G Kuerten	7	7

Quarterfinals
3	(United States) A Agassi	6	7^{12}
6	(Brazil) G Kuerten	2	6^{10}

=== Bottom half ===
==== Section 3 ====
First round
(Netherlands) J van Lottum	6	6
Q	(Zimbabwe) W Black	3	2
WC	(United States) P Goldstein	6	6
Q	(Australia) M Woodforde	3	2
(France) S Grosjean	5	3
12	(Germany) N Kiefer	7	6
13	(Sweden) T Enqvist	7	7^{7}
Q	(Australia) W Arthurs	5	6^{1}
(South Africa) W Ferreira	3	4
(United States) C Woodruff	6	6
(Romania) A Pavel	4	5
(Sweden) J Björkman	6	7

Second round
5	(United Kingdom) T Henman	6	6
(Netherlands) J van Lottum	2	1
WC	(United States) P Goldstein	6	4	6^{10}
12	(Germany) N Kiefer	2	6	7^{12}
13	(Sweden) T Enqvist	1	5
(United States) C Woodruff	6	7
(Sweden) J Björkman	1	4
4	(Russia) Y Kafelnikov	6	6

Third round
5	(United Kingdom) T Henman	6	6
12	(Germany) N Kiefer	4	1
(United States) C Woodruff	4	4
4	(Russia) Y Kafelnikov	6	6

Quarterfinals
5	(United Kingdom) T Henman	5	5
4	(Russia) Y Kafelnikov	7	7

==== Section 4 ====
First round
(United States) M Chang	6	6
(Russia) M Safin	3	4
(Croatia) G Ivanišević	6^{1}	2
(United States) J Courier	7^{7}	6
(France) C Pioline	6	6
10	(Spain) C Moyà	4	1
15	(Ecuador) N Lapentti	6	6
(United States) V Spadea	2	2
(Netherlands) S Schalken	6	3	4
(United States) J-M Gambill	4	6	6
WC	(Philippines) C Mamiit	4	4
(Czech Republic) D Vacek	6	6

Second round
8	(Spain) Á Corretja	3	7^{7}	2
(United States) M Chang	6	6^{5}	6
(United States) J Courier	7^{7}	6^{4}	0^{r}
(France) C Pioline	6^{5}	7^{7}	2
15	(Ecuador) N Lapentti	6	7^{7}
(United States) J-M Gambill	0	6^{3}
(Czech Republic) D Vacek	6^{3}	3
2	(Australia) P Rafter	7^{7}	6

Third round
(United States) M Chang	6	6
(France) C Pioline	1	4
15	(Ecuador) N Lapentti	2	3
2	(Australia) P Rafter	6	6

Quarterfinals
(United States) M Chang	2	1
2	(Australia) P Rafter	6	6

== Qualifying ==
=== Qualifying seeds ===
1. (France) Arnaud Clément (qualified)
2. (Australia) Mark Woodforde (qualified)
3. (Paraguay) Ramón Delgado (qualified)
4. (Germany) Bernd Karbacher (qualifying competition)
5. (Australia) Wayne Arthurs (qualified)
6. (Czech Republic) Martin Damm (qualifying competition)
7. (Croatia) Ivan Ljubičić (qualified)
8. (Zimbabwe) Wayne Black (qualified)
9. (Canada) Sébastien Lareau (qualifying competition)
10. (Belarus) Max Mirnyi (qualifying competition)
11. (Germany) Axel Pretzsch (qualified)
12. (Italy) Mosé Navarra (qualifying competition)
13. (Australia) Todd Woodbridge (first round)
14. (United States) Alex O'Brien (qualifying competition)

=== Qualifiers ===
1. (France) Arnaud Clément
2. (Australia) Mark Woodforde
3. (Paraguay) Ramón Delgado
4. (Germany) Axel Pretzsch
5. (Australia) Wayne Arthurs
6. (Zimbabwe) Wayne Black
7. (Croatia) Ivan Ljubičić

=== Qualifying draw ===
==== First qualifier ====
First round
1	(France) Arnaud Clément	6	6
WC	(United States) Jeff Morrison	1	2
(Italy) Cristiano Caratti	0	3
14	(United States) Alex O'Brien	6	6

Qualifying competition
1	(France) Arnaud Clément	6	2	7
14	(United States) Alex O'Brien	2	6	5

==== Second qualifier ====
First round
2	(Australia) Mark Woodforde	6	6
(United States) Bob Bryan	4	2
(Australia) Michael Tebbutt	3	1
12	(Italy) Mosé Navarra	6	6

Qualifying competition
2	(Australia) Mark Woodforde	6	6
12	(Italy) Mosé Navarra	0	3

==== Third qualifier ====
First round
3	(Paraguay) Ramón Delgado	6	2	6
(United Kingdom) Barry Cowan	2	6	1
(United States) Michael Joyce	6	4	7
13	(Australia) Todd Woodbridge	3	6	6

Qualifying competition
3	(Paraguay) Ramón Delgado	6	6
(United States) Michael Joyce	3	2

==== Fourth qualifier ====
First round
4	(Germany) Bernd Karbacher	6	6
WC	(United States) Mike Bryan	2	2
WC	(United States) Wynn Criswell	6	3	2
11	(Germany) Axel Pretzsch	3	6	6

Qualifying competition
4	(Germany) Bernd Karbacher	4	5
11	(Germany) Axel Pretzsch	6	7

==== Fifth qualifier ====
First round
5	(Australia) Wayne Arthurs	4	6	7
(Australia) Michael Hill	6	3	6
WC	(United States) Marq Foster	3	2
10	(Belarus) Max Mirnyi	6	6

Qualifying competition
5	(Australia) Wayne Arthurs	6	6
10	(Belarus) Max Mirnyi	3	4

==== Sixth qualifier ====
First round
6	(Czech Republic) Martin Damm	4	6	6
(The Bahamas) Mark Knowles	6	1	4
(Zimbabwe) Kevin Ullyett	0	4
8	(Zimbabwe) Wayne Black	6	6

Qualifying competition
6	(Czech Republic) Martin Damm	3	2
8	(Zimbabwe) Wayne Black	6	6

==== Seventh qualifier ====
First round
7	(Croatia) Ivan Ljubičić	7	6
(United States) Jared Palmer	6	4
(United States) Jonathan Stark	3	3
9	(Canada) Sébastien Lareau	6	6

Qualifying competition
7	(Croatia) Ivan Ljubičić	6	7
9	(Canada) Sébastien Lareau	1	6
