= 1999 Swisscom Challenge – Doubles =

Doubles
- 1999 Swisscom Challenge

Final
- Champions: (United States) Lisa Raymond (Australia) Rennae Stubbs
- Runners-up: (France) Nathalie Tauziat (Belarus) Natasha Zvereva
- Score: 6–2, 6–2

Details
- Draw: 16
- Seeds: 4

Events
Singles	Doubles
← 1998 ·	Swisscom Challenge	· 2000 →

The 1999 Swisscom Challenge doubles was the doubles event of the sixteenth edition of the Swisscom Challenge; a WTA Tier I tournament and the most prestigious tournament held in Switzerland. Serena and Venus Williams were the reigning champions, but neither competed this year.

Third seeds Lisa Raymond and Rennae Stubbs won the title, defeating first seeds Nathalie Tauziat and Natasha Zvereva in the final.

== Qualifying draw ==
Qualifying competition
1	(Croatia) Jelena Kostanić (United States) Tara Snyder	8
2	(Spain) María Sánchez Lorenzo (Spain) Magüi Serna	6

== Main draw ==
=== Seeds ===
1. (France) Nathalie Tauziat / (Belarus) Natasha Zvereva (final)
2. (Russia) Elena Likhovtseva / (Japan) Ai Sugiyama (quarterfinals)
3. (United States) Lisa Raymond / (Australia) Rennae Stubbs (champions)
4. (Romania) Irina Spîrlea / (Netherlands) Caroline Vis (quarterfinals)

=== Key ===
- Q = Qualifier
- WC = Wild card
- LL = Lucky loser
- Alt = Alternate
- SE = Special exempt
- PR = Protected ranking
- ITF = ITF entry
- JE = Junior exempt
- w/o = Walkover
- r = Retired
- d = Defaulted
- SR = Special ranking

First round
1	(France) N Tauziat (Belarus) N Zvereva	7^{11}	6
(Netherlands) M Bollegraf (Belgium) D Van Roost	6^{9}	4
(South Africa) A Coetzer (United States) C Morariu	6	6
(France) J Halard-Decugis (Latvia) L Neiland	2	3
4	(Romania) I Spîrlea (Netherlands) C Vis	6	6
(Czech Republic) S Kleinová (Czech Republic) M Paštiková	4	1
(United States) C Rubin (France) S Testud	4	5
(Netherlands) M Oremans (Switzerland) P Schnyder	6	7
(United States) L Osterloh (Russia) N Petrova	0	7^{7}	1
(Germany) A Huber (United States) K Po	6	6^{4}	6
(France) M Pierce (Austria) B Schett	6	4	4
3	(United States) L Raymond (Australia) R Stubbs	0	6	6
WC	(Canada) M Drake (Switzerland) M Vavrinec	4	6^{3}
Q	(Croatia) J Kostanić (United States) T Snyder	6	7^{7}
(Italy) S Farina (Slovakia) K Habšudová	7	2	2
2	(Russia) E Likhovtseva (Japan) A Sugiyama	5	6	6

Quarterfinals
1	(France) N Tauziat (Belarus) N Zvereva	7^{7}	6
(South Africa) A Coetzer (United States) C Morariu	6^{4}	1
4	(Romania) I Spîrlea (Netherlands) C Vis	4	6	6^{4}
(Netherlands) M Oremans (Switzerland) P Schnyder	6	3	7^{7}
(Germany) A Huber (United States) K Po	4	4
3	(United States) L Raymond (Australia) R Stubbs	6	6
Q	(Croatia) J Kostanić (United States) T Snyder	6	6
2	(Russia) E Likhovtseva (Japan) A Sugiyama	4	2

Semifinals
1	(France) N Tauziat (Belarus) N Zvereva	6	6
(Netherlands) M Oremans (Switzerland) P Schnyder	0	2
3	(United States) L Raymond (Australia) R Stubbs	6	6
(Croatia) J Kostanić (United States) T Snyder	1	0

Final
1	(France) N Tauziat (Belarus) N Zvereva	2	2
3	(United States) L Raymond (Australia) R Stubbs	6	6
