= Nathan Overholser =

American tennis player

- Country (sports): United States
- Born: June 23, 1979 (age 45)
- Height: 6 ft 2 in (188 cm)
- Plays: Left-handed

Singles
- Highest ranking: No. 1103 (May 7, 2001)

Doubles
- Career record: 1–2
- Highest ranking: No. 629 (Nov 24, 1997)

Grand Slam doubles results
- US Open: 2R (1997)

Nathan Overholser (born June 23, 1979) is an American former professional tennis player.

A left-hander from Okemos, Michigan, Overholser was Class A state high school singles champion in 1994 and played collegiate tennis for the University of Florida, where he earned three All-American selections.

Overholser was a wildcard pairing with Brandon Hawk in the 1997 US Open men's doubles main draw and the duo won through to the second round. He had an ATP Tour doubles main draw appearance in 2000 at the Indianapolis RCA Championships, partnering Todd Martin.
