= 2000 Swisscom Challenge – Singles =

Singles
- 2000 Swisscom Challenge

Final
- Champion: (Switzerland) Martina Hingis
- Runner-up: (United States) Lindsay Davenport
- Score: 6–4, 4–6, 7–5

Details
- Draw: 28
- Seeds: 8

Events
Singles	Doubles
← 1999 ·	Swisscom Challenge	· 2001 →

Martina Hingis defeated Lindsay Davenport in the final, 6–4, 4–6, 7–5 to win the singles tennis title at the 2000 Swisscom Challenge.

Venus Williams was the reigning champion, but did not compete this year.

== Seeds ==
The first four seeds received a bye into the second round.

1. (Switzerland) Martina Hingis (champion)
2. (United States) Lindsay Davenport (final)
3. (France) Nathalie Tauziat (quarterfinals)
4. (Russia) Anna Kournikova (quarterfinals)
5. (South Africa) Amanda Coetzer (second round)
6. (United States) Jennifer Capriati (semifinals)
7. (United States) Chanda Rubin (quarterfinals)
8. (Russia) Elena Dementieva (second round)

== Draw ==
Key

- Q = Qualifier
- WC = Wild card
- LL = Lucky loser
- Alt = Alternate
- ITF = ITF entry
- PR = Protected ranking
- SR = Special ranking
- SE = Special exempt
- JE = Junior exempt
- JR = Junior Accelerator Programme entrant
- CO = College Accelerator Programme entrant
- NG = Next Gen Accelerator Program entrant
- w/o = Walkover
- r = Retired
- d = Defaulted

=== Finals ===
Semifinals
1	(Switzerland) Martina Hingis	6	6
6	(United States) Jennifer Capriati	3	2
(Austria) Barbara Schett	2	1
2	(United States) Lindsay Davenport	6	6

Final
1	(Switzerland) Martina Hingis	6	4	7
2	(United States) Lindsay Davenport	4	6	5

=== Top half ===
First round
WC	(Switzerland) E Gagliardi	3	0
(Australia) J Dokic	6	6
(Switzerland) P Schnyder	4	6	1
Q	(Russia) A Myskina	6	2	6
(Romania) R Dragomir	3	4
8	(Russia) E Dementieva	6	6
(Spain) G León García	1	3
Q	(Russia) T Panova	6	6
(France) A-G Sidot	6	6^{2}	6
Q	(Germany) A Glass	1	7^{7}	4
WC	(Russia) L Krasnoroutskaya	7	3	6^{6}
6	(United States) J Capriati	5	6	7^{8}

Second round
1	(Switzerland) M Hingis	6	6
(Australia) J Dokic	3	2
Q	(Russia) A Myskina	6	2	6
8	(Russia) E Dementieva	4	6	1
4	(Russia) A Kournikova	6	6
Q	(Russia) T Panova	3	3
(France) A-G Sidot	3	1
6	(United States) J Capriati	6	6

Quarterfinals
1	(Switzerland) M Hingis	6	6
Q	(Russia) A Myskina	0	4
4	(Russia) A Kournikova	6^{4}	4
6	(United States) J Capriati	7^{7}	6

Semifinals
1	(Switzerland) M Hingis	6	6
6	(United States) J Capriati	3	2

=== Bottom half ===
First round
5	(South Africa) A Coetzer	6	6
(Spain) M Serna	4	1
(Austria) B Schett	6	6
(Russia) E Likhovtseva	0	1
(Belgium) D van Roost	7^{7}	2	6^{4}
WC	(Bulgaria) M Maleeva	6^{5}	6	7^{7}
7	(United States) C Rubin	2	6	6
(Croatia) S Talaja	6	1	2
Q	(Germany) J Kandarr	6	6
(Luxembourg) A Kremer	4	1
(Belgium) S Appelmans	6	4	6
(Japan) A Sugiyama	2	6	2

Second round
5	(South Africa) A Coetzer	6^{6}	6	4
(Austria) B Schett	7^{8}	3	6
WC	(Bulgaria) M Maleeva	4	0
3	(France) N Tauziat	6	6
7	(United States) C Rubin	6	2
Q	(Germany) J Kandarr	2	0^{r}
(Belgium) S Appelmans	2	1
2	(United States) L Davenport	6	6

Quarterfinals
(Austria) B Schett	3	6	6
3	(France) N Tauziat	6	3	3
7	(United States) C Rubin	2	4
2	(United States) L Davenport	6	6

Semifinals
(Austria) B Schett	2	1
2	(United States) L Davenport	6	6
