= 2000 Cincinnati Masters =

Tennis tournament

- Date: August 7–14
- Edition: 99th
- Category: Tennis Masters Series
- Draw: 64S / 32D
- Prize money: $2,450,000
- Surface: Hard / outdoor
- Location: Mason, United States
- Venue: Lindner Family Tennis Center

Champions

Singles
- (Sweden) Thomas Enqvist

Doubles
- (Australia) Mark Woodforde / (Australia) Todd Woodbridge
- Cincinnati Masters

The 2000 Cincinnati Masters was a men's tennis tournament and the 99th edition of the event previously known as the Great American Insurance ATP Championships. The tournament was part of the Tennis Masters Series of the 2000 ATP Tour. It took place in Mason, Ohio, United States, from August 7 through August 14, 2000. Thomas Enqvist won the singles title.

The tournament previously appeared on the Tier III of the WTA Tour; no event was held from 1989 to 2003.

== Finals ==
=== Singles ===
(Sweden) Thomas Enqvist defeated (United Kingdom) Tim Henman, 7–6^{(7–5)}, 6–4

- It was Thomas Enqvist's 1st title of the year and his 17th overall. It was his 1st Masters title of the year and his 3rd overall.

=== Doubles ===
(Australia) Mark Woodforde / (Australia) Todd Woodbridge defeated (South Africa) Ellis Ferreira / (United States) Rick Leach 7–6^{(8–6)}, 6–4
