= 1999 Swisscom Challenge – Singles =

Singles
- 1999 Swisscom Challenge

Final
- Champions: (United States) Venus Williams
- Runners-up: (Switzerland) Martina Hingis
- Score: 6–3, 6–4

Details
- Draw: 28
- Seeds: 8

Events
| Singles | Doubles |
| ← 1998 · | Swisscom Challenge | · 2000 → |

Venus Williams defeated Martina Hingis in the final, 6–3, 6–4 to win the singles tennis title at the 1999 European Indoor Championships.

Lindsay Davenport was the two-time reigning champion, but she did not compete this year.

== Seeds ==
The top four seeds received a bye to the second round.

1. (Switzerland) Martina Hingis (final)
2. (United States) Venus Williams (champion)
3. (France) Mary Pierce (semifinals)
4. (South Africa) Amanda Coetzer (quarterfinals)
5. (Austria) Barbara Schett (second round)
6. (France) Julie Halard-Decugis (quarterfinals)
7. (Belgium) Dominique Van Roost (quarterfinals)
8. (France) Nathalie Tauziat (semifinals)

== Draw ==
=== Key ===
- Q = Qualifier
- WC = Wild card
- LL = Lucky loser
- Alt = Alternate
- SE = Special exempt
- PR = Protected ranking
- ITF = ITF entry
- JE = Junior exempt
- w/o = Walkover
- r = Retired
- d = Defaulted
- SR = Special ranking

=== Finals ===
Semifinals
1 | (Switzerland) Martina Hingis | 6 | 4 | 6
8 | (France) Nathalie Tauziat | 3 | 6 | 3
3 | (France) Mary Pierce | 4 | 4
2 | (United States) Venus Williams | 6 | 6

Final
1 | (Switzerland) Martina Hingis | 3 | 4
2 | (United States) Venus Williams | 6 | 6

=== Top half ===
First round
(Russia) E Likhovtseva | 3 | 5
Q | (Russia) T Panova | 6 | 7
Q | (United States) C Morariu | 6 | 6
Q | (Russia) E Dementieva | 2 | 2
WC | (United States) L Raymond | 3 | 4
5 | (Austria) B Schett | 6 | 6
(United States) A Frazier | 6 | 1 | 4
(Switzerland) P Schnyder | 4 | 6 | 6
Q | (Spain) M Serna | 2 | 6 | 7
(Romania) R Dragomir | 6 | 3 | 5
(France) S Testud | 5 | 3
8 | (France) N Tauziat | 7 | 6

Second round
1 | (Switzerland) M Hingis | 7^{7} | 6
Q | (Russia) T Panova | 6^{4} | 2
Q | (United States) C Morariu | 7^{8} | 0 | 6
5 | (Austria) B Schett | 6^{6} | 6 | 4
4 | (South Africa) A Coetzer | 1 | 6 | 6
(Switzerland) P Schnyder | 6 | 3 | 2
Q | (Spain) M Serna | 3 | 6^{5}
8 | (France) N Tauziat | 6 | 7^{7}

Quarterfinals
1 | (Switzerland) M Hingis | 7 | 6
Q | (United States) C Morariu | 5 | 2
4 | (South Africa) A Coetzer | 3 | 6 | 2
8 | (France) N Tauziat | 6 | 3 | 6

Semifinals
1 | (Switzerland) M Hingis | 6 | 4 | 6
8 | (France) N Tauziat | 3 | 6 | 3

=== Bottom half ===
First round
7 | (Belgium) D Van Roost | 3 | 6 | 6
(Japan) A Sugiyama | 6 | 4 | 2
(Italy) S Farina | 6 | 6
WC | (Netherlands) M Oremans | 4 | 3
(France) N Dechy | 5 | 4
(United States) C Rubin | 7 | 6
6 | (France) J Halard-Decugis | 7^{7} | 4 | 7
WC | (United States) J Capriati | 6^{5} | 6 | 5
(Germany) A Huber | 6 | 6
(Belarus) N Zvereva | 2 | 2
(Romania) I Spîrlea | 6 | 7
LL | (Slovakia) H Nagyová | 2 | 5

Second round
7 | (Belgium) D Van Roost | 6 | 6
(Italy) S Farina | 2 | 2
(United States) C Rubin | 1 | 2
3 | (France) M Pierce | 6 | 6
6 | (France) J Halard-Decugis | 6 | 6
(Germany) A Huber | 2 | 4
(Romania) I Spîrlea | 3 | 2
2 | (United States) V Williams | 6 | 6

Quarterfinals
7 | (Belgium) D Van Roost | 2 | 4
3 | (France) M Pierce | 6 | 6
6 | (France) J Halard-Decugis | 6 | 4 | 3
2 | (United States) V Williams | 1 | 6 | 6

Semifinals
3 | (France) M Pierce | 4 | 4
2 | (United States) V Williams | 6 | 6

== Qualifying ==
=== Seeds ===
1. (Slovakia) Henrieta Nagyová (qualifying competition, lucky loser)
2. (Spain) Magüi Serna (qualifier)
3. (United States) Corina Morariu (qualifier)
4. (Spain) María Sánchez Lorenzo (second round)
5. (Slovakia) Karina Habšudová (second round)
6. (Canada) Maureen Drake (second round)
7. (Russia) Tatiana Panova (qualifier)
8. (United States) Tara Snyder (qualifying competition)

=== Qualifiers ===
1. (Russia) Elena Dementieva
2. (Russia) Tatiana Panova
3. (United States) Corina Morariu
4. (Spain) Magüi Serna

=== Lucky loser ===
1. (Slovakia) Henrieta Nagyová

== Qualifying draw ==
=== Key ===
- Q = Qualifier
- WC = Wild card
- LL = Lucky loser
- Alt = Alternate
- SE = Special exempt
- PR = Protected ranking
- ITF = ITF entry
- JE = Junior exempt
- w/o = Walkover
- r = Retired
- d = Defaulted
- SR = Special ranking

=== First qualifier ===
| First round | | | Second round | | | | | Qualifying competition |
| | | | 1 | (Slovakia) Henrieta Nagyová | 5 | 7 | 6 |
| (Poland) Anna Żarska | 3 | 2 | | (Czech Republic) Sandra Kleinová | 7 | 5 | 1 |
| (Czech Republic) Sandra Kleinová | 6 | 6 | | | | | | 1 | (Slovakia) Henrieta Nagyová | 3 | 6^{5} |
| (Russia) Elena Dementieva | 6 | 7^{7} | | | | | | | (Russia) Elena Dementieva | 6 | 7^{7} |
| (Belarus) Olga Barabanschikova | 2 | 6^{4} | | (Russia) Elena Dementieva | 6 | 6 |
| | | | 5 | (Slovakia) Karina Habšudová | 2 | 3 |

=== Second qualifier ===
| First round | | | Second round | | | | | Qualifying competition |
| | | | 4 | (Spain) María Sánchez Lorenzo | 3 | 7^{9} | 2 |
| (Czech Republic) Denisa Chládková | 6 | 6 | | (Czech Republic) Denisa Chládková | 6 | 6^{7} | 6 |
| (Germany) Angelika Bachmann | 0 | 1 | | | | | | | (Czech Republic) Denisa Chládková | 5 | 6 | 1 |
| (Czech Republic) Zuzana Ondrášková | w/o | | | | | | | 7 | (Russia) Tatiana Panova | 7 | 4 | 6 |
| (Germany) Jana Kandarr | | | | (Czech Republic) Zuzana Ondrášková | 1 | 2 |
| | | | 7 | (Russia) Tatiana Panova | 6 | 6 |

=== Third qualifier ===
| First round | | | Second round | | | | Qualifying competition |
| | | | 6 | (Canada) Maureen Drake | 1 | 3 |
| (Russia) Nadia Petrova | 6 | 6 | | (Russia) Nadia Petrova | 6 | 6 |
| (United States) Lilia Osterloh | 1 | 3 | | | | | | (Russia) Nadia Petrova | 6^{4} | 6 | 6^{7} |
| (Germany) Camilla Kremer | 6 | 6 | | | | | 3 | (United States) Corina Morariu | 7^{7} | 1 | 7^{9} |
| (Germany) Sabine Lohmann | 3 | 2 | | (Germany) Camilla Kremer | 1 | 2 |
| | | | 3 | (United States) Corina Morariu | 6 | 6 |

=== Fourth qualifier ===
First round
8 | (United States) Tara Snyder | 4 | 6 | 6
(Germany) Miriam Schnitzer | 6 | 3 | 4
(Croatia) Jelena Kostanić | 6 | 6^{5} | 6
(Czech Republic) Adriana Gerši | 1 | 7^{7} | 4
(Switzerland) Miroslava Vavrinec | 6 | 6
(Germany) Stephanie Gehrlein | 0 | 1

Second round
8 | (United States) Tara Snyder | 6 | 6
(Croatia) Jelena Kostanić | 4 | 4
(Switzerland) Miroslava Vavrinec | 3 | 5
2 | (Spain) Magüi Serna | 6 | 7

Qualifying competition
8 | (United States) Tara Snyder | 3 | 6 | 3
2 | (Spain) Magüi Serna | 6 | 0 | 6
