= 2000 du Maurier Open =

- Date: July 31 – August 6 (men); August 14–20 (women)
- Edition: 111th (men) / 99th (women)
- Surface: Hard / outdoor
- Location: Toronto, Ontario, Canada (men); Montreal, Quebec, Canada (women)

Champions

Men's singles
- (Russia) Marat Safin

Women's singles
- (Switzerland) Martina Hingis

Men's doubles
- (Canada) Sébastien Lareau / (Canada) Daniel Nestor

Women's doubles
- (Switzerland) Martina Hingis / (France) Nathalie Tauziat
- Canadian Open

The 2000 du Maurier Open was a tennis tournament played on outdoor hard courts. It was the 111th edition of the event known that year as the du Maurier Open, and was part of the Tennis Masters Series of the 2000 ATP Tour, and of the Tier I Series of the 2000 WTA Tour. The men's event took place at the National Tennis Centre in Toronto, Ontario, Canada, from July 31 through August 6, 2000, and the women's event at the du Maurier Stadium in Montreal, Quebec, Canada, from August 14 through August 20, 2000.

The men's field featured world No. 1, Australian Open champion, Wimbledon semifinalist Andre Agassi, ATP No. 2 and seven-time Wimbledon champion and Miami winner Pete Sampras, and French Open runner-up, Rome Masters, Auckland and Båstad titlist Magnus Norman. Also competing were French Open and Hamburg Masters champion Gustavo Kuerten, Australian Open finalist Yevgeny Kafelnikov, Thomas Enqvist, Lleyton Hewitt and Marat Safin.

The women's draw was led by world No. 1, Australian Open runner-up, French Open doubles champion and Canada defending champion Martina Hingis, WTA No. 2, Australian Open champion and Wimbledon finalist Lindsay Davenport, and French Open runner-up and Berlin titlist Conchita Martínez. Also lined up were Wimbledon doubles champion Serena Williams, Paris winner Nathalie Tauziat, Anke Huber, Arantxa Sánchez Vicario and Sandrine Testud.

== Finals ==
=== Men's singles ===
(Russia) Marat Safin defeated (Israel) Harel Levy, 6–2, 6–3

- It was Marat Safin's 3rd title of the year, and his 4th overall. It was his 1st career Masters title.

=== Women's singles ===
(Switzerland) Martina Hingis defeated (United States) Serena Williams, 0–6, 6–3, 3–0 retired

- It was Martina Hingis' 5th title of the year, and her 31st overall. It was her 3rd Tier I title of the year, her 12th overall, and her 2nd win at the event.

=== Men's doubles ===
(Canada) Sébastien Lareau / (Canada) Daniel Nestor defeated (Australia) Joshua Eagle / (Australia) Andrew Florent, 6–3, 7–6^{(7–3)}

=== Women's doubles ===
(Switzerland) Martina Hingis / (France) Nathalie Tauziat defeated (France) Julie Halard-Decugis / (Japan) Ai Sugiyama, 6–3, 3–6, 6–4
