= Brandon Hawk =

American tennis player

- Full name: Brandon Hawk
- Country (sports): United States
- Born: September 3, 1979 (age 46) Abilene, Texas, U.S.
- Plays: Right-handed
- Prize money: $97,578

Singles
- Highest ranking: No. 277 (August 20, 2001)

Doubles
- Career record: 2–4
- Career titles: 0
- Highest ranking: No. 154 (February 18, 2002)

Grand Slam doubles results
- Wimbledon: 1R (2001)
- US Open: 2R (1997)

Brandon Hawk (born September 3, 1979) is a former professional tennis player from the United States.

== Biography ==
=== Tennis career ===
Hawk is originally from Abilene, Texas. While still at Clyde High School in 1997 he played in the main draw of the US Open, in the doubles with Nathan Overholser. The pair won through to the second round by beating Marius Barnard and Tom Nijssen, then were eliminated by the 11th seeds, Swedes Jonas Björkman and Nicklas Kulti. He excelled in basketball while at Clyde High and received inquiries from universities over scholarship opportunities, but ended up playing tennis for the University of Texas. In 1999, his freshman year, Hawk earned All-American honours.

Coached on tour by Rick Meyers, Hawk was most successful in the doubles format. He made the quarter-finals of the doubles at Newport's Hall of Fame Tennis Championships, an ATP Tour tournament, in 2000. As a singles player he managed to defeat Jo-Wilfried Tsonga at a Futures tournament in Jamaica and also registered a win over James Blake at the Amarillo Challenger. He won a total of three Challenger titles, the singles at the Puebla Challenger in 2000 and two doubles tournaments in 2001. At the 2001 Wimbledon Championships he and partner Grant Silcock played a marathon first round double match against Marat Safin and Marc Rosset. The match went to tiebreaks in the first two sets and was eventually won by Safin and Rosset 10–8 in the fifth. He appeared in the doubles at the US Open for a second time in 2001.

=== Personal life ===
Hawk married his wife Ginny in 2002. A former pastor, he now works as a motivational speaker.

== Challenger titles ==
=== Singles: (1) ===
No.	Year	Tournament	Surface	Opponent	Score
1.	2000	Puebla, Mexico	Hard	(France) Antony Dupuis	7–6^{6}, 6–3

=== Doubles: (2) ===
No.	Year	Tournament	Surface	Partner	Opponents	Score
1.	2001	Aptos, U.S.A.	Hard	(United States) Robert Kendrick	(United States) Kelly Gullett (United States) Gavin Sontag	7–5, 7–5
2.	2001	Kerrville, U.S.A.	Hard	(United States) Robert Kendrick	(United States) Mardy Fish (United States) Jeff Morrison	6–3, 6–7^{7}, 6–3
