= 2000 du Maurier Open – Men's singles =

Men's singles
- 2000 du Maurier Open

Final
- Champion: (Russia) Marat Safin
- Runner-up: (Israel) Harel Levy
- Score: 6–2, 6–3

Details
- Draw: 64
- Seeds: 16

Events
Singles	men	women
Doubles	men	women
- du Maurier Open

Marat Safin defeated Harel Levy in the final, 6–2, 6–3 to win the men's singles tennis title at the 2000 Canadian Open. Levy became the first Israeli to reach a Masters final.

Thomas Johansson was the defending champion, but lost in the second round to Wayne Ferreira.

== Seeds ==
1. (United States) Andre Agassi (first round)
2. (United States) Pete Sampras (quarterfinals)
3. (Sweden) Magnus Norman (first round)
4. (Brazil) Gustavo Kuerten (second round)
5. (Russia) Yevgeny Kafelnikov (quarterfinals)
6. (Sweden) Thomas Enqvist (third round, retired)
7. (Australia) Lleyton Hewitt (second round)
8. (Russia) Marat Safin (champion)
9. (Spain) ~~Àlex Corretja~~ (withdrew)
10. (Ecuador) Nicolás Lapentti (first round)
11. (Germany) Nicolas Kiefer (second round)
12. (Spain) Juan Carlos Ferrero (third round)
13. (Argentina) Franco Squillari (first round)
14. (Australia) Patrick Rafter (quarterfinals)
15. (United Kingdom) Tim Henman (first round)
16. (Australia) Mark Philippoussis (first round)
17. (France) Nicolas Escudé (third round, retired)

== Draw ==
Key

- Q = Qualifier
- WC = Wild card
- LL = Lucky loser
- Alt = Alternate
- ITF = ITF entry
- PR = Protected ranking
- SR = Special ranking
- SE = Special exempt
- JE = Junior exempt
- JR = Junior Accelerator Programme entrant
- CO = College Accelerator Programme entrant
- NG = Next Gen Accelerator Program entrant
- w/o = Walkover
- r = Retired
- d = Defaulted

=== Finals ===
Quarterfinals
PR	(France) Jérôme Golmard	4	4
Q	(Israel) Harel Levy	6	6
14	(Australia) Patrick Rafter	6	6^{1}	2
(Czech Republic) Jiří Novák	3	7	6
5	(Russia) Yevgeny Kafelnikov	3	6^{1}
(South Africa) Wayne Ferreira	6	7
8	(Russia) Marat Safin	6	3	7
2	(United States) Pete Sampras	4	6	6^{8}

Semifinals
Q	(Israel) Harel Levy	6	1	6
(Czech Republic) Jiří Novák	3	6	4
(South Africa) Wayne Ferreira	2	7	4
8	(Russia) Marat Safin	6	5	6

Final
Q	(Israel) Harel Levy	2	3
8	(Russia) Marat Safin	6	6

=== Top half ===
==== Section 1 ====
First round
1	(United States) A Agassi	6^{4}	6^{6}
PR	(France) J Golmard	7	7
Q	(Thailand) P Srichaphan	6	6
(United States) C Woodruff	3	4
(France) A Clément	6	6
(Argentina) M Puerta	3	3
(Chile) M Ríos	6	3	6
15	(United Kingdom) T Henman	4	6	3
10	(Ecuador) N Lapentti	4	3
(Austria) S Koubek	6	6
LL	(Czech Republic) M Damm	6^{5}	6	3
Q	(Israel) H Levy	7	4	6
Q	(United States) C Mamiit	6^{5}	3
(France) S Grosjean	7	6
(Switzerland) R Federer	6	3	2
7	(Australia) L Hewitt	3	6	6

Second round
PR	(France) J Golmard	6	6
Q	(Thailand) P Srichaphan	3	2
(France) A Clément	4	6^{5}
(Chile) M Ríos	6	7
(Austria) S Koubek	1	3
Q	(Israel) H Levy	6	6
(France) S Grosjean	6	7
7	(Australia) L Hewitt	3	6^{5}

Third round
PR	(France) J Golmard	2	7	7
(Chile) M Ríos	6	5	5
Q	(Israel) H Levy	6	1	6
(France) S Grosjean	3	6	1

Quarterfinals
PR	(France) J Golmard	4	4
Q	(Israel) H Levy	6	6

==== Section 2 ====
First round
4	(Brazil) G Kuerten	6	6
(France) A Di Pasquale	4	4
(France) F Santoro	4	1
WC	(Canada) S Lareau	6	6
LL	(Australia) J Sekulov	4	4
(Slovakia) K Kučera	6	6
LL	(United Kingdom) A Parmar	1	6	3
14	(Australia) P Rafter	6	4	6
11	(Germany) N Kiefer	6	7
(United States) T Martin	1	5
(Czech Republic) J Novák	7	6
(Czech Republic) S Doseděl	6^{4}	3
(Australia) A Ilie	7	6
(Switzerland) M Rosset	6^{3}	4
(Netherlands) S Schalken	5	4
6	(Sweden) T Enqvist	7	6

Second round
4	(Brazil) G Kuerten	6^{4}	4
WC	(Canada) S Lareau	7	6
(Slovakia) K Kučera	3	5
14	(Australia) P Rafter	6	7
11	(Germany) N Kiefer	2	5
(Czech Republic) J Novák	6	7
(Australia) A Ilie	3	2
6	(Sweden) T Enqvist	6	6

Third round
WC	(Canada) S Lareau	4	2
14	(Australia) P Rafter	6	6
(Czech Republic) J Novák	6	1	3
6	(Sweden) T Enqvist	2	6	1^{r}

Quarterfinals
14	(Australia) P Rafter	6	6^{1}	2
(Czech Republic) J Novák	3	7	6

=== Bottom half ===
==== Section 3 ====
First round
5	(Russia) Y Kafelnikov	7	3	7
(Spain) F Vicente	5	6	6^{0}
(Belarus) M Mirnyi	6^{4}	6	6
WC	(Canada) F Niemeyer	7	3	3
(Argentina) G Gaudio	7	7
(United States) J Tarango	6^{3}	5
WC	(Canada) D Nestor	7	5	4
12	(Spain) JC Ferrero	6^{5}	7	6
13	(Argentina) F Squillari	6^{6}	4
(South Africa) W Ferreira	7	6
(Sweden) T Johansson	7	6
(Sweden) A Vinciguerra	6^{8}	4
(Morocco) H Arazi	3	3
(United States) M Chang	6	6
(Netherlands) R Krajicek	7	7
3	(Sweden) M Norman	5	6^{7}

Second round
5	(Russia) Y Kafelnikov	6	6
(Belarus) M Mirnyi	4	4
(Argentina) G Gaudio	7	3	3
12	(Spain) JC Ferrero	6^{4}	6	6
(South Africa) W Ferreira	6	6
(Sweden) T Johansson	4	4
(United States) M Chang	2	5
(Netherlands) R Krajicek	6	7

Third round
5	(Russia) Y Kafelnikov	6	4	6
12	(Spain) JC Ferrero	1	6	4
(South Africa) W Ferreira	7	7
(Netherlands) R Krajicek	5	6^{4}

Quarterfinals
5	(Russia) Y Kafelnikov	3	6^{1}
(South Africa) W Ferreira	6	7

==== Section 4 ====
First round
8	(Russia) M Safin	6	1	6
Q	(Sweden) J Björkman	4	6	3
(Argentina) JI Chela	2	2
(Romania) A Pavel	6	6
SE	(Spain) E Benfele Álvarez	2	3
Q	(France) C Saulnier	6	6
(Argentina) M Zabaleta	3	6	1
17	(France) N Escudé	6	3	6
16	(Australia) M Philippoussis	4	6^{6}
(Armenia) S Sargsian	6	7
Q	(United States) D Wheaton	6^{3}	6^{3}
WC	(Canada) S Larose	7	7
(Morocco) K Alami	6	6
Q	(Australia) P Tramacchi	2	4
Q	(France) M Llodra	7	2	6^{4}
2	(United States) P Sampras	5	6	7

Second round
8	(Russia) M Safin	6^{5}	6	6
(Romania) A Pavel	7	3	0
Q	(France) C Saulnier	6^{5}	7	2
17	(France) N Escudé	7	6^{8}	6
(Armenia) S Sargsian	6	2
WC	(Canada) S Larose	3	2
(Morocco) K Alami	6^{3}	2
2	(United States) P Sampras	7	6

Third round
8	(Russia) M Safin	3
17	(France) N Escudé	2	r
(Armenia) S Sargsian	1	2
2	(United States) P Sampras	6	6

Quarterfinals
8	(Russia) M Safin	6	3	7
2	(United States) P Sampras	4	6	6^{8}
