= 2000 Swisscom Challenge =

- Date: 8–15 October
- Edition: 17th
- Category: WTA Tier I
- Draw: 28S / 16D
- Prize money: USD1,080,000
- Surface: Carpet, indoor
- Location: Zürich, Switzerland
- Venue: Schluefweg

Champions

Singles
- (Switzerland) Martina Hingis

Doubles
- (Switzerland) Martina Hingis / (Russia) Anna Kournikova
- Zurich Open

The 2000 Swisscom Challenge was a women's tennis tournament played on indoor carpet courts. It was the 17th edition of the event and was part of the Tier I Series of the 2000 WTA Tour. It took place at the Schluefweg in Zürich, Switzerland, from 8 through 15 October 2000. First-seeded Martina Hingis won the singles title.

== Finals ==
=== Singles ===
(Switzerland) Martina Hingis defeated (United States) Lindsay Davenport, 6–4, 4–6, 7–5

- It was Hingis' 7th singles title of the year and the 33rd of her career.

=== Doubles ===
(Switzerland) Martina Hingis / (Russia) Anna Kournikova defeated (United States) Kimberly Po / (France) Anne-Gaëlle Sidot, 6–3, 6–4

- It was the 31st title for Hingis and the 10th title for Kournikova in their respective careers.

== Points and prize money ==
=== Point distribution ===
Event	W	F	SF	QF	Round of 16	Round of 32	Q	Q3	Q2	Q1
Singles	260	182	117	65	36	1	6	3	1	0
Doubles	260	182	117	65	1	—N/a	?	—N/a	—N/a	—N/a

=== Prize money ===
Event	W	F	SF	QF	Round of 16	Round of 32	Q3	Q2	Q1
Singles	$166,000	$83,000	$41,500	$20,500	$13,300	$7,800	$3,500	$2,200	$1,000
Doubles *	$51,000	$27,150	$17,000	$8,700	$4,400	—N/a	—N/a	—N/a	—N/a

_{* per team}

== Singles main draw entrants ==
=== Seeds ===
Country	Player	Rank^{1}	Seed
SUI	Martina Hingis	1	1
USA	Lindsay Davenport	2	2
FRA	Nathalie Tauziat	7	3
RUS	Anna Kournikova	12	4
RSA	Amanda Coetzer	13	5
USA	Jennifer Capriati	14	6
USA	Chanda Rubin	16	7
RUS	Elena Dementieva	17	8

^{1} Rankings as of 2 October 2000.

=== Other entrants ===
The following players received wildcards into the singles main draw:

- (Switzerland) Emmanuelle Gagliardi
- (Russia) Lina Krasnoroutskaya
- (Bulgaria) Magdalena Maleeva

The following players received entry from the qualifying draw:

- (Germany) Andrea Glass
- (Germany) Jana Kandarr
- (Russia) Anastasia Myskina
- (Russia) Tatiana Panova

== Doubles main draw entrants ==
=== Seeds ===
Country	Player	Country	Player	Rank^{1}	Seed
JPN	Ai Sugiyama	FRA	Nathalie Tauziat	11	1
SUI	Martina Hingis	RUS	Anna Kournikova	12	2
ZIM	Cara Black	RUS	Elena Likhovtseva	31	3
USA	Chanda Rubin	AUT	Barbara Schett	37	4

^{1} Rankings as of 2 October 2000.

=== Other entrants ===
The following pair received a wildcard into the doubles main draw:

- (Russia) Lina Krasnoroutskaya / (Russia) Anastasia Myskina

The following pair received entry from the qualifying draw:

- (Germany) Andrea Glass / (Germany) Bianka Lamade
