= Patty Schnyder career statistics =

Career finals
Discipline	Type	Won	Lost	Total	WR (Note: Winning rate)
Singles	Grand Slam	–	–	–	–
Singles	Summer Olympics	–	–	–	–
Singles	WTA Finals (Note: Formerly known as: Virginia Slims Championships (until 1995); WTA Tour Championships (until 2014))	–	–	–	–
Singles	Grand Slam Cup	0	1	1	0.00
Singles	WTA Elite (Note: Elite tier: WTA Tournament of Champions (2009–14); WTA Elite Trophy (2015–present))	–	–	–	–
Singles	WTA 1000 (Note: Formerly known as: Category 4 & 5 & 6 (until 1990); Tier I (until 2009); WTA Premier Mandatory and 5 (until 2021))	1	5	6	0.17
Singles	WTA 500 (Note: Formerly known as: Category 3 (until 1990); Tier II (until 2009); WTA Premier (until 2021))	1	4	5	0.20
Singles	WTA 250 (Note: Formerly known as: Category 1 & 2 (until 1990); Tier III & IV & V (until 2009); WTA International (until 2021))	9	6	15	0.60
Singles	Total	11	16	27	0.41
Doubles	Grand Slam	–	–	–	–
Doubles	Summer Olympics	–	–	–	–
Doubles	WTA Finals	–	–	–	–
Doubles	Grand Slam Cup	–	–	–	–
Doubles	WTA Elite	–	–	–	–
Doubles	WTA 1000	0	1	1	0.00
Doubles	WTA 500	5	5	10	0.50
Doubles	WTA 250	0	5	5	0.00
Doubles	Total	5	11	16	0.31
Total		16	27	43	0.37

This is a list of the main career statistics of Swiss tennis player Patty Schnyder.

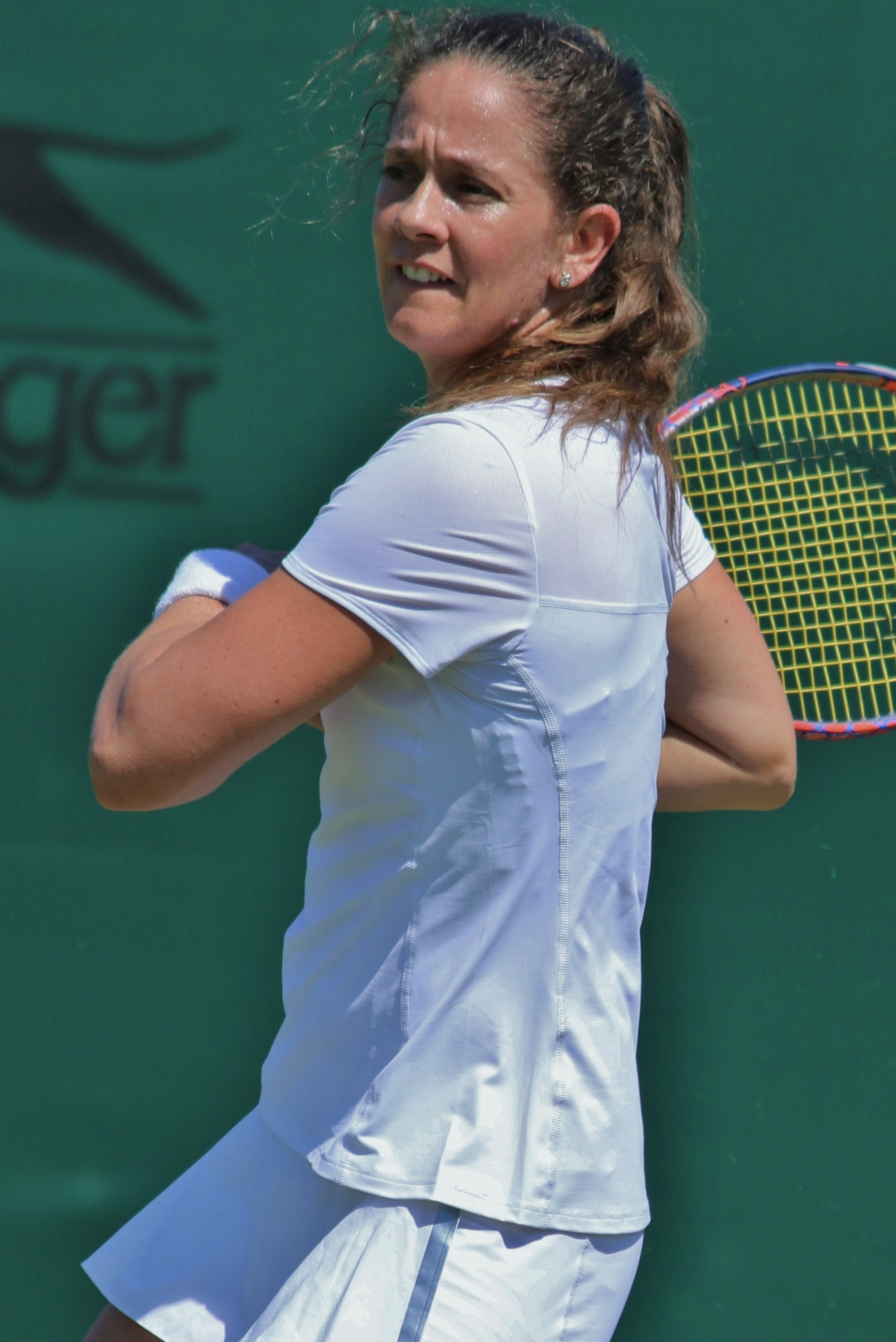
Schnyder at the 2018 Wimbledon Championships.

== Performance timelines ==
Key
W	F	SF	QF	#R	RR	Q#	P#	DNQ	A	Z#	PO	G	S	B	NMS	NTI	P	NH

(W) winner; (F) finalist; (SF) semifinalist; (QF) quarterfinalist; (#R) rounds 4, 3, 2, 1; (RR) round-robin stage; (Q#) qualification round; (P#) preliminary round; (DNQ) did not qualify; (A) absent; (Z#) Davis/Fed Cup Zonal Group (with number indication) or (PO) play-off; (G) gold, (S) silver or (B) bronze Olympic/Paralympic medal; (NMS) not a Masters tournament; (NTI) not a Tier I tournament; (P) postponed; (NH) not held; (SR) strike rate (events won / competed); (W–L) win–loss record.

Only main-draw results in WTA Tour, Grand Slam tournaments, Billie Jean King Cup (Fed Cup), Hopman Cup and Olympic Games are included in win–loss records.

=== Singles ===
Tournament	1994	1995	1996	1997	1998	1999	2000	2001	2002	2003	2004	2005	2006	2007	2008	2009	2010	2011	2015	2016	2017	2018	SR	W–L	Win%
Grand Slam tournaments
Australian Open	A	A	Q1	4R	4R	2R	4R	1R	1R	4R	SF	QF	QF	4R	2R	2R	A	1R	A	A	A	Q1	0 / 14	31–14	
French Open	A	A	1R	3R	QF	3R	1R	2R	4R	4R	2R	4R	4R	4R	QF	1R	1R	1R	A	A	A	A	0 / 16	29–16	
Wimbledon	A	A	1R	1R	2R	1R	2R	3R	2R	1R	2R	1R	2R	4R	1R	1R	1R	A	A	A	A	Q1	0 / 15	10–15	
US Open	A	A	A	3R	QF	3R	2R	2R	3R	2R	4R	4R	4R	3R	QF	2R	3R	A	A	A	Q2	1R	0 / 15	31–15	
Win–loss	0–0	0–0	0–2	7–4	12–4	5–4	5–4	4–4	6–4	7–4	10–4	10–4	11–4	11–4	9–4	2–4	2–3	0–2	0–0	0–0	0–0	0–1	0 / 60	101–60	
Year-end championships
WTA Finals	DNQ				1R	DNQ			1R	DNQ		RR	DNQ										0 / 3	1–4	
Grand Slam Cup	NH				F	A	NH																0 / 1	2–1	
National representation
Olympics	NH		1R	NH			A	NH			3R	NH			2R	NH				A	NH		0 / 3	3–3	
Fed Cup	A	A	G1	PO	F	A	RR	A	1R	PO	1R	A	A	G1	G1	WG2	G1	G1	A	A	A	PO	0 / 4	33–17	
WTA 1000 + former^{†} tournaments
Dubai / Qatar Open (Note: The first Premier 5 event of the year has switched back and forth between the Dubai Tennis Championships and the Qatar Total Open since 2009. Dubai was classified as a Premier 5 event from 2009 to 2011 before being succeeded by Doha for the 2012–2014 period. In 2015, Dubai regained its Premier 5 status while Doha was demoted to Premier status. The Premier 5 tournaments were reclassified as WTA 1000 tournaments in 2021.)	NH/NMS														2R	A	1R	3R	A	A	A	A	0 / 3	3–3	
Indian Wells Open	NMS		A	A	A	3R	3R	2R	2R	A	A	A	A	A	A	2R	2R	1R	A	A	A	A	0 / 7	4–7	
Miami Open	A	A	A	2R	4R	4R	3R	2R	2R	A	A	3R	4R	2R	3R	3R	2R	2R	A	A	A	A	0 / 13	13–12	
Berlin / Madrid Open (Note: In 2009, the Berlin Open was replaced by the Madrid Open. The Premier Mandatory tournaments were reclassified as WTA 1000 tournaments in 2021.)	A	A	A	1R	1R	QF	1R	3R	A	3R	3R	SF	QF	QF	1R	SF	3R	1R	A	A	A	A	0 / 14	22–13	
Italian Open	A	A	A	SF	1R	3R	1R	2R	2R	3R	2R	F	3R	SF	QF	3R	2R	1R	A	A	A	A	0 / 15	24–15	
Canadian Open	A	A	A	A	1R	1R	2R	A	2R	A	A	A	A	3R	3R	2R	2R	A	A	A	A	A	0 / 8	10–9	
Cincinnati Open	NH/NMS															2R	A	A	A	A	A	A	0 / 1	1–1	
Pan Pacific / Wuhan Open (Note: In 2014, the Pan Pacific Open was downgraded to a Premier event and replaced by the Wuhan Open. The Premier 5 tournaments were reclassified as WTA 1000 tournaments in 2021.)	A	A	A	A	A	A	A	A	A	A	A	A	A	A	A	1R	A	A	A	A	A	A	0 / 1	0–1	
China Open	NH/NMS															2R	2R	A	A	A	A	A	0 / 2	2–2	
Charleston Open^{†}	A	A	A	2R	QF	SF	3R	1R	F	2R	SF	SF	F	2R	QF	NMS							0 / 12	27–12	
Southern California Open^{†}	NMS										1R	QF	SF	F	NH/NMS								0 / 4	10–4	
Kremlin Cup^{†}	NH/NMS			2R	2R	1R	2R	A	A	1R	1R	2R	QF	2R	A	NMS							0 / 9	6–9	
Zurich Open^{†}	Q1	2R	1R	1R	2R	2R	1R	1R	W	QF	SF	F	1R	2R	NH/NMS								1 / 13	18–12	
Career statistics
	1994	1995	1996	1997	1998	1999	2000	2001	2002	2003	2004	2005	2006	2007	2008	2009	2010	2011	2015	2016	2017	2018	SR	W–L	Win%
Titles	0	0	0	0	5	1	0	1	1	0	0	2	0	0	1	0	0	0	0	0	0	0	11		
Finals	0	0	1	0	6	1	1	2	2	0	0	5	2	2	2	1	2	0	0	0	0	0	27		
Overall W–L	0–0	1–1	7–10	23–24	56–22	29–23	33–26	24–24	36–26	28–23	34–22	58–25	45–24	45–25	34–22	21–22	26–19	3–9	0–0	0–1	1–1	1–4		505–353	
Year-end ranking	786	152	64	26	11	21	25	37	15	23	14	7	9	16	14	43	44	N/A	740	304	144	286			

=== Doubles ===
Tournament	1994	1995	1996	1997	1998	1999	2000	2001	2002	2003	2004	2005	2006	2007	2008	2009	2010	2011	2015	2016	2017	SR	W–L	Win%
Grand Slam tournaments
Australian Open	A	A	A	1R	2R	3R	3R	1R	1R	1R	2R	1R	A	3R	2R	QF	A	3R	A	A	A	0 / 13	14–13	
French Open	A	A	A	3R	QF	3R	A	2R	QF	3R	3R	SF	2R	1R	1R	QF	1R	2R	A	A	A	0 / 14	24–14	
Wimbledon	A	A	A	2R	1R	1R	1R	2R	2R	1R	3R	A	A	1R	A	A	1R	A	A	A	A	0 / 10	5–10	
US Open	A	A	A	1R	QF	1R	2R	1R	2R	2R	SF	QF	A	2R	3R	3R	1R	A	A	A	A	0 / 13	18–13	
Win–loss	0–0	0–0	0–0	3–4	7–4	4–4	3–3	2–4	5–4	3–4	9–4	7–3	1–1	3–4	3–3	8–3	0–3	3–2	0–0	0–0	0–0	0 / 50	61–50	
National representation
Olympics	Not Held		QF	Not Held			A	Not Held			2R	Not Held			2R	Not Held				A	NH	0 / 3	4–3	
Fed Cup	A	A	G1	PO	F	A	RR	A	1R	PO	1R	A	A	G1	G1	WG2	G1	G1	A	A	A	0 / 4	17–6	
WTA 1000 + former^{†} tournaments																								
Dubai / Qatar Open	Not Tier I														1R	A	1R	A	A	A	A	0 / 2	0–2	
Indian Wells Open	NT I		A	A	A	2R	1R	1R	A	A	A	A	A	A	A	1R	1R	A	A	A	A	0 / 5	1–5	
Miami Open	A	A	A	1R	3R	2R	3R	1R	A	A	A	1R	1R	A	1R	SF	2R	A	A	A	A	0 / 10	8–10	
Berlin / Madrid Open	A	A	A	1R	1R	2R	1R	2R	A	1R	1R	QF	A	A	2R	1R	QF	A	A	A	A	0 / 11	7–11	
Italian Open	A	A	A	QF	2R	A	2R	2R	2R	1R	A	A	A	A	A	A	1R	A	A	A	A	0 / 7	6–7	
Canadian Open	A	A	A	A	1R	2R	1R	A	1R	A	A	A	A	A	A	1R	A	A	A	A	A	0 / 5	1–5	
Cincinnati Open	Not Held										Not Tier I					1R	A	A	A	A	A	0 / 1	0–1	
Pan Pacific / Wuhan Open	A	A	A	A	A	A	A	A	A	A	A	A	A	A	A	1R	A	A	A	A	A	0 / 1	0–1	
China Open	Not Held										Not Tier I					QF	1R	A	A	A	A	0 / 2	2–2	
Charleston Open^{†}	A	A	A	A	1R	F	1R	2R	2R	1R	SF	A	A	2R	A	NM5						0 / 8	10–8	
Southern California Open^{†}	Not Tier I										A	A	A	2R	Not held		NM5					0 / 1	1–1	
Kremlin Cup^{†}	Not held		NT I	1R	1R	1R	QF	A	A	QF	1R	1R	A	QF	A	NM5						0 / 8	3–8	
Zurich Open^{†}	A	A	QF	A	1R	SF	1R	A	1R	1R	1R	QF	A	1R	NT I	Not held						0 / 9	4–9	
Career statistics
	1994	1995	1996	1997	1998	1999	2000	2001	2002	2003	2004	2005	2006	2007	2008	2009	2010	2011	2015	2016	2017	Career		
Titles	0	0	0	0	1	0	0	0	1	1	1	0	0	0	1	0	0	0	0	0	0	5		
Finals	0	0	0	0	3	1	1	1	1	2	2	1	0	0	2	2	0	0	0	0	0	16		
Overall W–L	0–0	0–0	7–7	14–19	23–20	17–20	18–22	13–19	13–15	19–17	25–16	16–13	1–2	7–10	14–14	21–16	7–16	4–4	0–0	0–1	0–0		219–231	
Year-end ranking	N/A	441	104	59	29	41	47	77	56	40	18	32	N/A	87	52	31	110	N/A	N/A	N/A	N/A			

== WTA Tour finals ==
=== Singles: 27 (11 titles, 16 runner-ups) ===
Legend Finals (0–1) WTA 1000 (Tier I) (1–5) WTA 500 (Tier II) (1–4) WTA 250 (Tier III / Tier IV / Tier V / International) (9–6)	Finals by surface Hard (6–7) Clay (3–8) Carpet (2–1)

Result	W–L	Date	Tournament	Tier	Surface	Opponent	Score
Loss	0–1	Sep 1996	Czech Open, Czech Republic	Tier IV	Clay	(Romania) Ruxandra Dragomir	2–6, 6–3, 4–6
Win	1–1	Jan 1998	Hobart International, Australia	Tier IV	Hard	(Belgium) Dominique Van Roost	6–3, 6–2
Win	2–1	Feb 1998	Hanover Grand Prix, Germany	Tier II	Carpet (i)	(Czech Republic) Jana Novotná	6–0, 3–6, 7–5
Win	3–1	May 1998	Madrid Open, Spain	Tier III	Clay	(Belgium) Dominique Van Roost	3–6, 6–4, 6–0
Win	4–1	Jul 1998	Austrian Open, Austria	Tier IV	Clay	(Spain) Gala León García	6–2, 4–6, 6–3
Win	5–1	Jul 1998	Palermo Ladies Open, Italy	Tier IV	Clay	(Austria) Barbara Schett	6–1, 5–7, 6–2
Loss	5–2	Sep 1998	Grand Slam Cup, Germany	Finals	Hard (i)	(United States) Venus Williams	2–6, 6–3, 2–6
Win	6–2	Jan 1999	Gold Coast Championships, Australia	Tier III	Hard	(France) Mary Pierce	4–6, 7–6^{(7–5)}, 6–2
Loss	6–3	Jul 2000	Austrian Open, Austria	Tier III	Clay	(Austria) Barbara Schett	7–5, 4–6, 4–6
Loss	6–4	Jul 2001	Austrian Open, Austria	Tier III	Clay	(Uzbekistan) Iroda Tulyaganova	3–6, 2–6
Win	7–4	Nov 2001	Pattaya Open, Thailand	Tier V	Hard	(Slovakia) Henrieta Nagyová	6–0, 6–4
Loss	7–5	Apr 2002	Charleston Open, United States	Tier I	Clay	(Croatia) Iva Majoli	6–7^{(5–7)}, 4–6
Win	8–5	Oct 2002	Zurich Open, Switzerland	Tier I	Carpet (i)	(United States) Lindsay Davenport	6–7^{(5–7)}, 7–6^{(10–8)}, 6–3
Win	9–5	Jan 2005	Gold Coast Championships, Australia	Tier III	Hard	(Australia) Samantha Stosur	1–6, 6–3, 7–5
Loss	9–6	May 2005	Italian Open, Italy	Tier I	Clay	(France) Amélie Mauresmo	6–2, 3–6, 4–6
Win	10–6	Jul 2005	Cincinnati Open, United States	Tier III	Hard	(Japan) Akiko Morigami	6–4, 6–0
Loss	10–7	Oct 2005	Zurich Open, Switzerland	Tier I	Carpet (i)	(United States) Lindsay Davenport	6–7^{(5–7)}, 3–6
Loss	10–8	Oct 2005	Ladies Linz, Austria	Tier II	Hard (i)	(Russia) Nadia Petrova	6–4, 3–6, 1–6
Loss	10–9	Apr 2006	Charleston Open, United States	Tier I	Clay	(Russia) Nadia Petrova	3–6, 6–4, 1–6
Loss	10–10	Jul 2006	Stanford Classic, United States	Tier II	Hard	(Belgium) Kim Clijsters	4–6, 2–6
Loss	10–11	Aug 2007	San Diego Open, United States	Tier I	Hard	(Russia) Maria Sharapova	2–6, 6–3, 0–6
Loss	10–12	Oct 2007	Ladies Linz, Austria	Tier II	Hard (i)	(Slovakia) Daniela Hantuchová	4–6, 2–6
Loss	10–13	Mar 2008	Bangalore Open, India	Tier II	Hard	(United States) Serena Williams	5–7, 3–6
Win	11–13	Sep 2008	Bali Tennis Classic, Indonesia	Tier III	Hard	(Austria) Tamira Paszek	6–3, 6–0
Loss	11–14	Jul 2009	Budapest Grand Prix, Hungary	International	Clay	(Hungary) Ágnes Szávay	6–2, 4–6, 2–6
Loss	11–15	Jul 2010	Budapest Grand Prix, Hungary	International	Clay	(Hungary) Ágnes Szávay	2–6, 4–6
Loss	11–16	Oct 2010	Ladies Linz, Austria	International	Hard (i)	(Serbia) Ana Ivanovic	1–6, 2–6

=== Doubles: 16 (5 titles, 11 runner-ups) ===
Legend WTA 1000 (Tier I) (0–1) WTA 500 (Tier II / Premier) (5–5) WTA 250 (Tier III / Tier IV / International) (0–5)	Finals by surface Hard (1–4) Clay (1–7) Carpet (3–0)

Result	W–L	Date	Tournament	Tier	Surface	Partner	Opponents	Score
Loss	0–1	Apr 1998	Amelia Island Championships, United States	Tier II	Clay	(Austria) Barbara Schett	(United States) Sandra Cacic (France) Mary Pierce	6–7^{(5–7)}, 6–4, 6–7^{(5–7)}
Win	1–1	May 1998	Hamburg Grand Prix, Germany	Tier II	Clay	(Austria) Barbara Schett	(Switzerland) Martina Hingis (Czech Republic) Jana Novotná	7–6^{(7–3)}, 3–6, 6–3
Loss	1–2	Jul 1998	Palermo Ladies Open, Italy	Tier IV	Clay	(Austria) Barbara Schett	(Bulgaria) Pavlina Nola (Germany) Elena Pampoulova	4–6, 2–6
Loss	1–3	Apr 1999	Charleston Open, United States	Tier I	Clay	(Austria) Barbara Schett	(Russia) Elena Likhovtseva (Czech Republic) Jana Novotná	1–6, 4–6
Loss	1–4	Jul 2000	Austrian Open, Austria	Tier III	Clay	(Austria) Barbara Schett	(Argentina) Laura Montalvo (Argentina) Paola Suárez	6–7^{(5–7)}, 1–6
Loss	1–5	Oct 2001	Luxembourg Open, Luxembourg	Tier III	Hard (i)	(Germany) Bianka Lamade	(Russia) Elena Bovina (Slovakia) Daniela Hantuchová	3–6, 3–6
Win	2–5	Feb 2002	Antwerp Games, Belgium	Tier II	Carpet (i)	(Bulgaria) Magdalena Maleeva	(France) Nathalie Dechy (United States) Meilen Tu	6–3, 6–7^{(3–7)}, 6–3
Win	3–5	Feb 2003	Paris Indoors, France	Tier II	Carpet (i)	(Austria) Barbara Schett	(France) Marion Bartoli (France) Stéphanie Cohen-Aloro	2–6, 6–2, 7–6^{(7–5)}
Loss	3–6	Apr 2003	Bol Ladies Open, Croatia	Tier III	Clay	(Switzerland) Emmanuelle Gagliardi	(Hungary) Petra Mandula (Austria) Patricia Wartusch	3–6, 2–6
Win	4–6	Feb 2004	Paris Indoors, France	Tier II	Carpet (i)	(Austria) Barbara Schett	(Italy) Silvia Farina Elia (Italy) Francesca Schiavone	6–3, 6–2
Loss	4–7	Oct 2004	Ladies Linz, Austria	Tier II	Hard (i)	(France) Nathalie Dechy	(Slovakia) Janette Husárová (Russia) Elena Likhovtseva	2–6, 5–7
Loss	4–8	Apr 2005	Amelia Island Championships, United States	Tier II	Clay	(Czech Republic) Květa Peschke	(Australia) Bryanne Stewart (Australia) Samantha Stosur	4–6, 2–6
Win	5–8	Oct 2008	Stuttgart Grand Prix, Germany	Tier II	Hard (i)	(Germany) Anna-Lena Grönefeld	(Czech Republic) Květa Peschke (Australia) Rennae Stubbs	6–2, 6–4
Loss	5–9	Oct 2008	Zurich Open, Switzerland	Tier II	Hard (i)	(Germany) Anna-Lena Grönefeld	(Zimbabwe) Cara Black (United States) Liezel Huber	1–6, 6–7^{(3–7)}
Loss	5–10	Apr 2009	Charleston Open, United States	Premier	Clay	(Latvia) Līga Dekmeijere	(United States) Bethanie Mattek-Sands (Russia) Nadia Petrova	6–7^{(5–7)}, 6–2, [11–9]
Loss	5–11	Jul 2009	İstanbul Cup, Turkey	International	Hard	(Germany) Julia Görges	(Czech Republic) Lucie Hradecká (Czech Republic) Renata Voráčová	6–2, 3–6, [10–12]

== ITF Circuit finals ==
=== Singles: 14 (7 titles, 7 runner-ups) ===
Legend $75,000 tournaments (0–3) $50,000 tournaments (0–1) $25,000 tournaments (2–3) $10,000 tournaments (5–0)	Finals by surface Hard (0–2) Clay (7–5)

Result	W–L	Date	Tournament	Tier	Surface	Opponent	Score
Win	1–0	May 1995	ITF Nitra, Slovakia	10,000	Clay	(Chile) Bárbara Castro	1–6, 6–2, 6–3
Win	2–0	May 1995	ITF Prešov, Slovak Republic	10,000	Clay	(Czech Republic) Jana Ondrouchová	6–1, 6–0
Win	3–0	Jun 1995	ITF Cureglia, Switzerland	10,000	Clay	(Germany) Camilla Kremer	6–2, 6–1
Loss	3–1	Aug 1995	ITF Athens, Greece	25,000	Clay	(Slovakia) Henrieta Nagyová	2–6, 0–6
Loss	3–2	Apr 1996	ITF Murcia, Spain	75,000	Clay	(Bulgaria) Elena Pampoulova	4–6, 3–6
Loss	3–3	Sep 1996	ITF Bratislava, Slovakia	75,000	Clay	(Slovakia) Henrieta Nagyová	0–6, 4–6
Win	4–3	Sep 2015	ITF Prague, Czech Republic	10,000	Clay	(Slovakia) Zuzana Luknárová	6–1, 6–2
Loss	4–4	Dec 2015	ITF Bangkok, Thailand	25,000	Hard	(Estonia) Kaia Kanepi	3–6, 3–6
Win	5–4	May 2016	ITF Båstad, Sweden	10,000	Clay	(Norway) Melanie Stokke	6–1, 6–3
Loss	5–5	Jun 2017	Bredeney Ladies Open, Germany	25,000	Clay	(Estonia) Kaia Kanepi	6–3, 6–7^{(5–7)}, 0–2 ret.
Win	6–5	Jul 2017	ITF Périgueux, France	25,000	Clay	(Italy) Camilla Rosatello	6–4, 7–5
Win	7–5	Jul 2017	ITF Horb, Germany	25,000	Clay	(Switzerland) Conny Perrin	6–3, 6–1
Loss	7–6	Sep 2017	Open de Biarritz, France	75,000	Clay	(Romania) Mihaela Buzărnescu	4–6, 3–6
Loss	7–7	Nov 2017	Toronto Challenger, Canada	50,000	Hard	(Belgium) Ysaline Bonaventure	6–7^{(3–7)}, 3–6

== Top 10 wins ==
Season	1997	1998	1999	2000	2001	2002	2003	2004	2005	2006	2007	2008	2009	2010	Total
Wins	4	6	1	2	1	6	2	2	5	3	5	1	3	1	42

#	Player	vsRank	Event	Surface	Round	Score	Rank
1997
1.	(Croatia) Iva Majoli	8	Australian Open	Hard	1R	7–5, 6–1	63
2.	(South Africa) Amanda Coetzer	10	Italian Open	Clay	3R	7–6^{(7–3)}, 7–5	51
3.	(Spain) Arantxa Sánchez Vicario	7	Italian Open	Clay	QF	6–1, 6–1	51
4.	(Croatia) Iva Majoli	4	Stuttgart Open, Germany	Hard (i)	2R	6–2, 6–2	34
1998
5.	(Croatia) Iva Majoli	5	Faber Grand Prix, Germany	Carpet (i)	2R	6–1, 6–3	25
6.	(Czech Republic) Jana Novotná	3	Faber Grand Prix, Germany	Carpet (i)	F	6–0, 3–6, 7–5	25
7.	(Spain) Arantxa Sánchez Vicario	6	Hamburg Open, Germany	Clay	QF	6–3, 6–0	18
8.	(South Africa) Amanda Coetzer	4	French Open	Clay	1R	6–4, 3–6, 8–6	18
9.	(Czech Republic) Jana Novotná	3	Grand Slam Cup, Munich	Hard (i)	QF	2–6, 7–5, 7–5	9
10.	(Switzerland) Martina Hingis	1	Grand Slam Cup, Munich	Hard (i)	SF	5–7, 7–5, 5–5 ret.	9
1999
	(France) Mary Pierce	7	Australian Hard Court Championships	Hard	F	4–6, 7–6^{(7–5)}, 6–2	11
2000
	(France) Amélie Mauresmo	6	Australian Open	Hard	2R	6–4, 6–4	29
	(France) Sandrine Testud	10	Amelia Island Championships, United States	Clay	2R	7–6^{(7–4)}, 7–6^{(7–0)}	30
2001
	(Spain) Conchita Martínez	9	Hamburg Open, Germany	Clay	2R	6–3, 2–6, 6–2	46
2002
	(Serbia and Montenegro) Jelena Dokic	6	Diamond Games, Belgium	Carpet (i)	2R	4–6, 6–4, 1–1 ret.	42
	(France) Amélie Mauresmo	10	Charleston Open, United States	Clay	2R	6–4, 3–6, 6–2	30
	(United States) Serena Williams	3	Charleston Open, United States	Clay	QF	2–6, 6–4, 7–5	30
	(United States) Jennifer Capriati	1	Charleston Open, United States	Clay	SF	6–4, 6–3	30
	(Slovakia) Daniela Hantuchová	9	Zurich Open, Switzerland	Carpet (i)	QF	6–7^{(5–7)}, 6–3, 7–6^{(7–5)}	19
	(United States) Lindsay Davenport	10	Zurich Open, Switzerland	Carpet (i)	F	6–7^{(5–7)}, 7–6^{(10–8)}, 6–3	19
2003
	(France) Amélie Mauresmo	7	Zurich Open, Switzerland	Hard (i)	2R	6–2, 6–2	18
	(Russia) Anastasia Myskina	9	Linz Open, Austria	Hard (i)	QF	6–1, 6–1	28
2004
	(Russia) Elena Dementieva	6	Charleston Open, United States	Clay	3R	6–3, 6–1	17
	(United States) Lindsay Davenport	4	Charleston Open, United States	Clay	QF	6–3, 6–2	17
2005
	(Russia) Elena Dementieva	6	Australian Open	Hard	4R	6–7^{(6–8)}, 7–6^{(7–4)}, 6–2	14
	(Russia) Anastasia Myskina	5	Dubai Championships, UAE	Hard	QF	6–7^{(0–7)}, 7–6^{(7–2)}, 6–2	14
	(Russia) Svetlana Kuznetsova	7	Berlin Open, Germany	Clay	QF	6–2, 6–2	13
	(Russia) Maria Sharapova	2	Italian Open	Clay	SF	3–6, 6–3, 6–1	13
	(Russia) Nadia Petrova	10	WTA Championships, Los Angeles	Hard (i)	RR	6–0, 5–7, 6–4	8
2006
	(Russia) Elena Dementieva	8	Open GDF Suez, France	Carpet (i)	QF	6–3, 6–3	9
	(Belgium) Justine Henin	3	Charleston Open, United States	Clay	SF	2–6, 6–3, 6–2	9
	(Russia) Elena Dementieva	6	San Diego Open, United States	Hard	QF	6–4, 6–3	8
2007
	(Switzerland) Martina Hingis	7	German Open	Clay	3R	6–4, 6–0	19
	(Russia) Nadia Petrova	9	San Diego Open, United States	Hard	QF	6–4, 6–4	17
	(United States) Serena Williams	6	Zurich Open, Switzerland	Carpet (i)	1R	6–0, 3–0 ret.	17
	(Russia) Anna Chakvetadze	7	Linz Open, Austria	Hard (i)	QF	6–1, 6–0	17
	(France) Marion Bartoli	9	Linz Open, Austria	Hard (i)	SF	7–6^{(7–5)}, 6–3	17
2008
	(Russia) Svetlana Kuznetsova	7	Stuttgart Open, Germany	Hard (i)	1R	6–4, 4–6, 7–5	11
2009
	(United States) Serena Williams	2	Italian Open	Clay	2R	6–2, 2–6, 6–1	20
	(Russia) Nadia Petrova	10	Madrid Open, Spain	Clay	3R	6–4, 6–7^{(2–7)}, 7–6^{(7–5)}	20
	(Serbia) Jelena Janković	4	Madrid Open, Spain	Clay	QF	7–6^{(8–6)}, 6–3	20
2010
	(Poland) Agnieszka Radwańska	9	Madrid Open, Spain	Clay	2R	3–6, 6–4, 6–4	48

== Head-to-head vs. top 10 ranked players ==
Player	Years	Record	Win %	Hard	Clay	Grass	Carpet
Number 1 ranked players							
(West Germany) / (Germany) Steffi Graf	1998	1–0	100%	1–0	–	–	–
(Switzerland) Martina Hingis	1998–2007	3–2	60%	2–1	1–0	–	0–1
(Serbia and Montenegro) / (Serbia) Ana Ivanovic	2005–2011	5–5	50%	4–2	1–3	–	–
(Serbia and Montenegro) / (Serbia) Jelena Janković	2004–2009	2–3	40%	1–2	1–1	–	–
(United States) Serena Williams	1998–2009	4–8	33%	0–6	3–0	–	1–2
(Belgium) Kim Clijsters	2000–2009	3–6	33%	1–4	1–0	1–0	0–2
(France) Amélie Mauresmo	1998–2008	6–13	32%	3–7	3–3	–	0–3
(Spain) Arantxa Sánchez Vicario	1996–2000	2–6	25%	0–2	2–3	–	0–1
(United States) Jennifer Capriati	2000–2002	1–3	25%	0–1	1–1	0–1	–
(Denmark) Caroline Wozniacki	2005–2010	1–4	20%	1–2	0–2	–	–
(United States) Lindsay Davenport	1997–2006	2–10	17%	0–7	1–2	0–1	1–0
(Belgium) Justine Henin	2001–2007	1–8	11%	0–2	1–4	0–1	0–1
(Russia) Maria Sharapova	2004–2018	1–8	11%	0–5	1–2	0–1	–
(Belarus) Aryna Sabalenka	2016	0–1	0%	–	–	–	0–1
(Romania) Simona Halep	2010–2018	0–2	0%	–	0–2	–	–
(Socialist Federal Republic of Yugoslavia) / (Federal Republic of Yugoslavia) / (United States) Monica Seles	1998–2002	0–3	0%	0–2	0–1	–	–
(Russia) Dinara Safina	2002–2009	0–4	0%	0–1	0–2	–	0–1
(United States) Venus Williams	1998–2010	0–11	0%	0–6	0–5	–	–
Number 2 ranked players							
(Spain) Paula Badosa	2018	1–0	100%	–	1–0	–	–
(Poland) Agnieszka Radwańska	2008–2010	2–1	67%	0–1	2–0	–	–
(Russia) Anastasia Myskina	2000–2006	3–2	60%	3–1	–	0–1	–
(Czech Republic) Petra Kvitová	2008–2009	1–1	50%	1–1	–	–	–
(Russia) Svetlana Kuznetsova	2002–2008	3–4	43%	1–2	2–2	–	–
(China) Li Na	2005–2009	2–3	40%	2–2	0–1	–	–
(Spain) Conchita Martínez	1996–2005	3–8	27%	1–2	1–3	0–1	1–2
(Czechoslovakia) / (Czech Republic) Jana Novotná	1996–1999	2–6	25%	1–2	0–3	–	1–1
(Russia) Vera Zvonareva	2003–2011	1–3	25%	1–0	0–3	–	–
Number 3 ranked players							
(United States) Jessica Pegula	2018	1–0	100%	1–0	–	–	–
(France) Nathalie Tauziat	1998	1–0	100%	–	–	–	1–0
(Russia) Nadia Petrova	2000–2010	8–7	53%	6–6	2–1	–	–
(Russia) Elena Dementieva	1997–2008	7–10	41%	4–4	1–3	–	2–3
(South Africa) Amanda Coetzer	1997–2004	2–6	25%	0–5	2–0	–	0–1
(France) Mary Pierce	1995–2006	2–7	22%	1–1	1–3	0–1	0–2
Number 4 ranked players							
(Czechoslovakia) / (Czech Republic) Helena Suková	1997–1998	2–0	100%	1–0	–	1–0	–
(United States) Sofia Kenin	2017	1–0	100%	1–0	–	–	–
(Socialist Federal Republic of Yugoslavia) / (Croatia) Iva Majoli	1997–2002	4–1	80%	2–0	1–1	–	1–0
(Bulgaria) Magdalena Maleeva	2000–2005	4–3	57%	4–0	0–1	–	0–2
(United States) Mary Joe Fernández	1997–1998	1–1	50%	1–1	–	–	–
(Italy) Francesca Schiavone	2001–2008	4–5	44%	4–4	–	–	0–1
(Australia) Samantha Stosur	2005–2018	2–3	40%	1–1	1–2	–	–
(West Germany) / (Germany) Anke Huber	1998–2001	1–2	33%	0–2	1–0	–	–
(Federal Republic of Yugoslavia) / (Australia) Jelena Dokić	2001–2003	1–4	20%	0–1	0–3	–	1–0
(Slovakia) Dominika Cibulková	2008	0–1	0%	0–1	–	–	–
Number 5 ranked players							
(Russia) Anna Chakvetadze	2005–2007	2–1	67%	1–1	–	–	1–0
(Czech Republic) Lucie Šafářová	2006–2011	2–2	50%	2–2	–	–	–
(Italy) Sara Errani	2009	1–1	50%	0–1	1–0	–	–
(Slovakia) Daniela Hantuchová	2001–2010	9–10	47%	5–10	2–0	–	2–0
Number 6 ranked players							
(Italy) Flavia Pennetta	2005–2007	3–0	100%	2–0	1–0	–	–
(United States) Chanda Rubin	1997–2006	3–1	75%	2–1	–	–	1–0
Number 7 ranked players							
(France) Julie Halard-Decugis	1998–2000	3–0	100%	1–0	2–0	–	–
(United States) Madison Keys	2011	1–0	100%	1–0	–	–	–
(Romania) Irina Spîrlea	1998	1–0	100%	–	–	–	1–0
(Czech Republic) Nicole Vaidišová	2005	1–0	100%	–	1–0	–	–
(France) Marion Bartoli	2004–2008	5–1	83%	4–1	1–0	–	–
(Italy) Roberta Vinci	2004–2007	3–1	75%	1–1	1–0	1–0	–
(Austria) Barbara Schett	1998–2003	5–4	56%	1–2	4–1	–	0–1
Number 8 ranked players							
(Czech Republic) Karolína Muchová	2015	1–0	100%	–	1–0	–	–
(Australia) Alicia Molik	1999–2007	4–1	80%	4–1	–	–	–
(Japan) Ai Sugiyama	1999–2009	2–4	33%	1–2	0–1	0–1	1–0
(Russia) Anna Kournikova	1995–1999	1–4	20%	–	1–4	–	–
Number 9 ranked players							
(Germany) Andrea Petkovic	2009–2010	2–0	100%	1–0	1–0	–	–
(Switzerland) Timea Bacsinszky	2008	1–0	100%	–	1–0	–	–
(Russia) Veronika Kudermetova	2018	1–0	100%	1–0	–	–	–
(United States) Lori McNeil	1998	1–0	100%	–	1–0	–	–
(Belgium) Dominique Monami	1996–1999	4–1	80%	2–0	1–0	–	1–1
(France) Sandrine Testud	1997–2000	4–3	57%	1–2	3–0	–	0–1
(Netherlands) Brenda Schultz-McCarthy	1997–2007	1–1	50%	1–0	0–1	–	–
(Argentina) Paola Suárez	1999–2006	4–5	44%	4–0	0–3	0–1	0–1
Number 10 ranked players							
(Czechoslovakia) / (Slovakia) Karina Habšudová	1999–2000	3–0	100%	2–0	–	1–0	–
(France) Kristina Mladenovic	2009	1–0	100%	1–0	–	–	–
(Austria) Barbara Paulus	1996	1–0	100%	–	1–0	–	–
(Russia) Maria Kirilenko	2005	0–1	0%	0–1	–	–	–
Total	1995–2018	160–216	43%	86–112 (43%)	54–67 (45%)	4–9 (31%)	16–28 (36%)
