= Květa Peschke career statistics =

Career finals
Discipline	Type	Won	Lost	Total
Singles	Grand Slam	–	–	0
Singles	WTA Finals (Note: Formerly known as: Virginia Slims Championships (until 1995); WTA Tour Championships (until 2014))	–	–	0
Singles	WTA Elite (Note: Elite tier: WTA Tournament of Champions (2009–14); WTA Elite Trophy (2015–present))	–	–	0
Singles	WTA 1000 (Note: Formerly known as: Category 4 & 5 & 6 (until 1990); Tier I (until 2009); WTA Premier Mandatory and 5 (until 2021))	–	–	0
Singles	WTA 500 (Note: Formerly known as: Category 3 (until 1990); Tier II (until 2009); WTA Premier (until 2021))	0	1	1
Singles	WTA 250 (Note: Formerly known as: Category 1 & 2 (until 1990); Tier III & IV & V (until 2009); WTA International (until 2021))	1	0	1
Singles	Olympics	–	–	0
Singles	Total	1	1	2
Doubles	Grand Slam	1	2	3
Doubles	WTA Finals	0	3	3
Doubles	WTA Elite	–	–	0
Doubles	WTA 1000	7	13	20
Doubles	WTA 500	20	14	34
Doubles	WTA 250	8	10	18
Doubles	Olympics	–	–	0
Doubles	Total	36	42	78
Mixed	Grand Slam	0	3	3
Mixed	Total	0	3	3

This is a list of the main career statistics of professional Czech tennis player Květa Peschke.

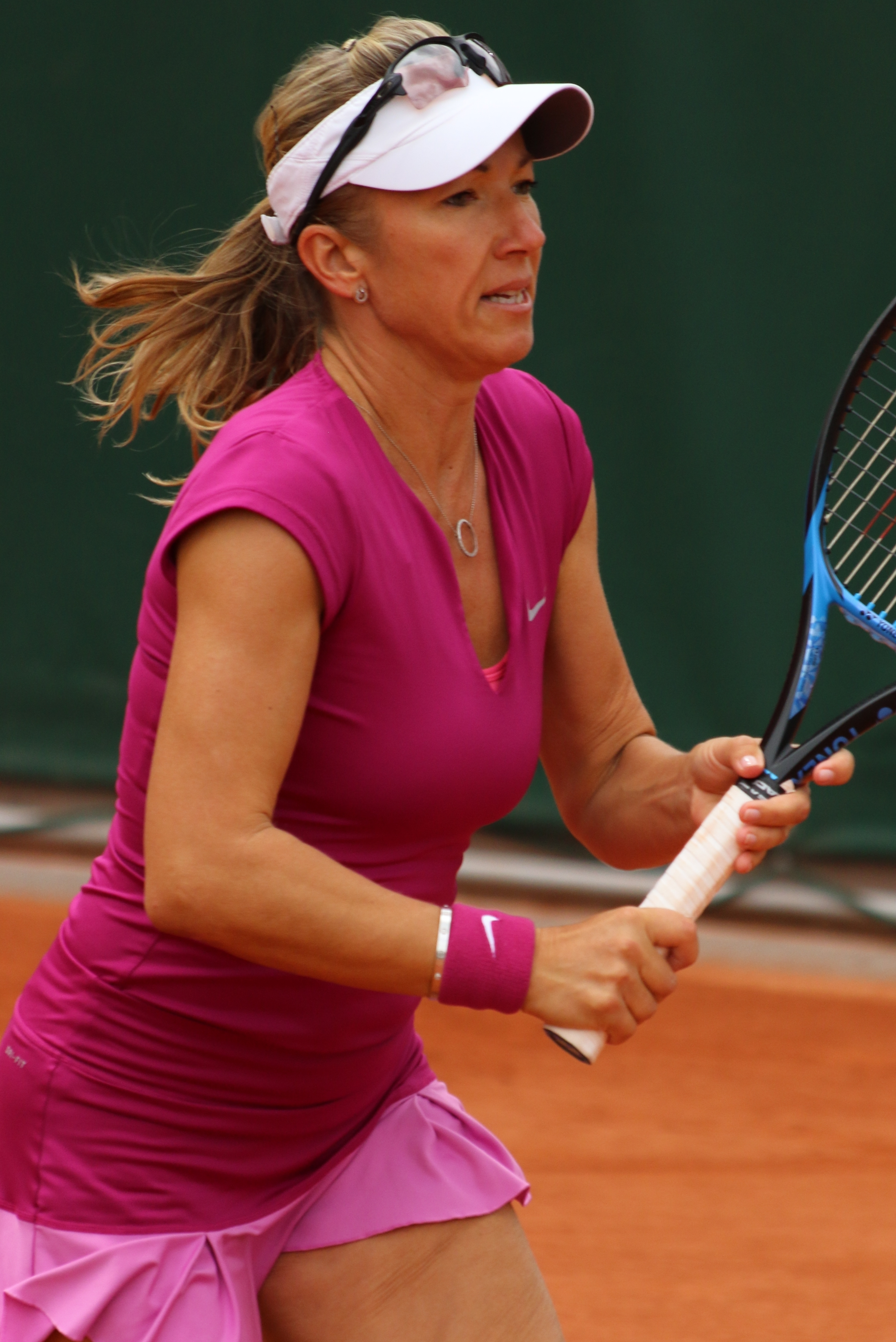
Peschke at the 2019 French Open

== Performance timelines ==
Key
W	F	SF	QF	#R	RR	Q#	P#	DNQ	A	Z#	PO	G	S	B	NMS	NTI	P	NH

(W) winner; (F) finalist; (SF) semifinalist; (QF) quarterfinalist; (#R) rounds 4, 3, 2, 1; (RR) round-robin stage; (Q#) qualification round; (P#) preliminary round; (DNQ) did not qualify; (A) absent; (Z#) Davis/Fed Cup Zonal Group (with number indication) or (PO) play-off; (G) gold, (S) silver or (B) bronze Olympic/Paralympic medal; (NMS) not a Masters tournament; (NTI) not a Tier I tournament; (P) postponed; (NH) not held; (SR) strike rate (events won / competed); (W–L) win–loss record.
To avoid confusion and double counting, these charts are updated at the conclusion of a tournament or when the player's participation has ended.

Only main-draw results in WTA Tour, Grand Slam tournaments, Billie Jean King Cup (Fed Cup), Hopman Cup and Olympic Games are included in win–loss records.

=== Singles ===
Tournament	1998	1999	2000	2001	2002	2003	2004	2005	2006	2007	SR	W–L	Win%
Grand Slam tournaments
Australian Open	A	1R	3R	A	2R	A	A	1R	A	A	0 / 4	3–4	
French Open	2R	3R	3R	1R	1R	A	2R	2R	1R	2R	0 / 9	8–9	
Wimbledon	1R	1R	1R	A	2R	A	A	4R	2R	A	0 / 6	5–6	
US Open	2R	1R	2R	1R	1R	A	A	1R	1R	A	0 / 7	2–7	
Win–Loss	2–3	2–4	5–4	0–2	2–4	0–0	1–1	4–4	1–3	1–1	0 / 26	18–26	

=== Doubles ===
Tournament	1994	...	1999	2000	2001	2002	2003	2004	2005	2006	2007	2008	2009	2010	2011	2012	2013	2014	2015	2016	2017	2018	2019	2020	2021	SR	W–L
Grand Slam tournaments
Australian Open	A		3R	1R	A	QF	A	A	1R	A	A	QF	3R	2R	SF	2R	2R (Note: Withdraw during the tournament. Not counted as a loss.)	SF	1R	A	3R	3R	3R	2R	A	0 / 16	28–15
French Open	2R		2R	2R	3R	1R	A	1R	3R	QF	3R	3R	3R	F	QF	QF	2R	QF	A	1R	1R	3R	QF	3R	2R	0 / 22	38–21
Wimbledon	1R		1R	2R	A	2R	A	A	1R	QF	QF	3R	A	QF	W	2R	SF	1R	A	QF	SF	F	QF	NH	1R	1 / 18	39–17
US Open	A		2R	2R	3R	1R	A	A	1R	SF	SF	1R	A	3R	QF	QF	3R	QF	A	1R	1R	1R	2R	QF	2R	0 / 19	29–19
Win–Loss	1–2		4–4	3–4	4–1	4–4	0–0	0–1	2–4	9–3	9–3	7–4	4–2	11–4	16–3	8–4	8–3	10–4	0–1	3–3	6–4	9–4	9–4	5–3	2–3	1 / 74	134–72
Year-end championships
WTA Finals	DNQ		Did Not Qualify							SF	SF	F	DNQ	F	F	DNQ		SF	DNQ		QF	QF	Alt	NH	DNQ	0 / 8	4–8
National representation
Summer Olympics	NH		NH	1R	Not Held			A	Not Held			A	Not Held			A	Not Held			A	Not Held				A	0 / 1	0–1
WTA 1000 + former^{†} tournaments
Dubai / Qatar Open (Note: The first Premier 5 event of the year has switched back and forth between the Dubai Tennis Championships and the Qatar Total Open since 2009. Dubai was classified as a Premier 5 event from 2009 to 2011 before being succeeded by Doha for the 2012–2014 period. In 2015, Dubai regained its Premier 5 status while Doha was demoted to Premier status. The Premier 5 tournaments were reclassified as WTA 1000 tournaments in 2021.)	NH		Not Held		Not Tier I							W	2R	F	F	A	SF	F	2R	A	2R	1R	2R	A	A	1 / 10	18–9
Indian Wells Open	A		A	A	1R	1R	A	A	1R	A	A	2R	1R	W	1R	1R	A	QF	A	A	1R	2R	1R	NH	1R	1 / 13	9–13
Miami Open	A		2R	A	A	1R	A	A	1R	2R	2R	SF	F	2R	1R	1R	A	QF	A	A	2R	1R	1R	NH	A	0 / 14	14–14
Berlin / Madrid Open (Note: In 2009, the Berlin Open was replaced by the Madrid Open. The Premier Mandatory tournaments were reclassified as WTA 1000 tournaments in 2021.)	1R		QF	1R	1R	A	A	2R	1R	A	SF	SF	F	1R	F	QF	1R	2R	A	1R	QF	2R	2R	NH	A	0 / 18	14–18
Italian Open	A		2R	2R	A	A	A	2R	A	F	SF	QF	QF	2R	SF	2R	2R	W	A	A	2R	1R	2R	A	A	1 / 15	20–15
Canadian Open	A		A	A	2R	A	A	A	A	QF	A	SF	A	F	2R	1R	F	2R	A	2R	F	SF	QF	NH	QF	0 / 13	20–13
Cincinnati Open	NH		Not Held					Not Tier I					A	2R	SF	2R	F	2R	A	2R	1R	2R	2R	W	A	1 / 10	15–9
Pan Pacific / Wuhan Open (Note: In 2014, the Toray Pan Pacific Open was downgraded to a Premier event and replaced by the Wuhan Open. The Premier 5 tournaments were reclassified as WTA 1000 tournaments in 2021.)	A		A	A	A	A	A	A	A	1R	A	A	A	QF	A	F	QF	2R	A	1R	QF	QF	QF	Not Held		0 / 9	10–9
China Open	NH		Not Held					Not Tier I					A	QF	W	QF	1R	2R	A	1R	2R	QF	QF	Not Held		1 / 9	12–9
Charleston Open^{†}	A		1R	A	A	A	A	A	F	QF	A	QF	Not Tier I													0 / 4	6–4
Kremlin Cup^{†}	A		A	A	A	A	A	A	QF	W	QF	QF	Not Tier I													1 / 4	7–3
Zurich Open^{†}	A		A	A	A	A	A	A	1R	QF	W	NTI	Not Held													1 / 3	5–1
Sn. California Open^{†}	NTI		Not Tier I					A	A	2R	1R	Not Held		Not Tier I				NH	NTI	Not Held						1 / 2	1–2
Career statistics
	1994	...	1999	2000	2001	2002	2003	2004	2005	2006	2007	2008	2009	2010	2011	2012	2013	2014	2015	2016	2017	2018	2019	2020	2021	SR	W–L

=== Mixed doubles ===
Tournament	2002	...	2005	2006	2007	2008	2009	2010	2011	2012	2013	2014	2015	2016	2017	2018	2019	2020	2021	SR	W–L
Australian Open	QF		A	A	A	QF	1R	1R	1R	1R	SF	2R	1R	A	A	2R	1R	1R	A	0 / 12	8–11
French Open	A		2R	1R	1R	SF	1R	A	2R	QF	1R	1R	A	A	1R	1R	1R	NH	A	0 / 12	7–12
Wimbledon	2R		2R	3R	3R	QF	A	A	2R	3R	QF	3R	A	A	2R	2R	SF	NH	SF	0 / 13	12–13
US Open	A		1R	F	2R	2R	A	F	A	F	QF	QF	A	A	2R	2R	QF	NH	A	0 / 11	22–11
Win–Loss	3–2		1–3	5–3	2–3	7–3	0–2	4–2	1–3	7–4	6–4	4–4	0–1	0–0	1–3	2–4	5–4	0–1	1–1	0 / 48	49–47

== Grand Slam tournament finals ==
=== Doubles: 3 (1 title, 2 runner-ups) ===
Result	Year	Tournament	Surface	Partner	Opponents	Score
Loss	2010	French Open	Clay	(Slovenia) Katarina Srebotnik	(United States) Serena Williams (United States) Venus Williams	2–6, 3–6
Win	2011	Wimbledon	Grass	(Slovenia) Katarina Srebotnik	(Germany) Sabine Lisicki (Australia) Samantha Stosur	6–3, 6–1
Loss	2018	Wimbledon	Grass	(United States) Nicole Melichar	(Czech Republic) Barbora Krejčíková (Czech Republic) Kateřina Siniaková	4–6, 6–4, 0–6

=== Mixed doubles: 3 (3 runner-ups) ===
Result	Year	Tournament	Surface	Partner	Opponents	Score
Loss	2006	US Open	Hard	(Czech Republic) Martin Damm	(United States) Martina Navratilova (United States) Bob Bryan	2–6, 3–6
Loss	2010	US Open	Hard	(Pakistan) Aisam-ul-Haq Qureshi	(United States) Liezel Huber (United States) Bob Bryan	4–6, 4–6
Loss	2012	US Open	Hard	(Poland) Marcin Matkowski	(Russia) Ekaterina Makarova (Brazil) Bruno Soares	7–6^{(10–8)}, 1–6, [10–12]

== Other significant finals ==
=== Year-end championships ===
==== Doubles: 3 runner-ups ====
Result	Year	Tournament	Surface	Partner	Opponents	Score
Loss	2008	WTA Championships, Qatar	Hard	(Australia) Rennae Stubbs	(Zimbabwe) Cara Black (United States) Liezel Huber	1–6, 5–7
Loss	2010	WTA Championships, Qatar	Hard	(Slovenia) Katarina Srebotnik	(Argentina) Gisela Dulko (Italy) Flavia Pennetta	5–7, 4–6
Loss	2011	WTA Championships, Turkey	Hard (i)	(Slovenia) Katarina Srebotnik	(United States) Liezel Huber (United States) Lisa Raymond	4–6, 4–6

== WTA Tour finals ==
=== Singles: 2 (1 title, 1 runner-up) ===
Legend
Tier II (0–1)
Tier IV (1–0)

Result	W–L	Date	Tournament	Tier	Surface	Opponent	Score
Win	1–0	Apr 1998	Makarska Championships, Croatia	Tier IV	Clay	(China) Li Fang	6–3, 6–1
Loss	1–1	Nov 1999	Sparkassen Cup, Germany	Tier II	Carpet (i)	(France) Nathalie Tauziat	1–6, 3–6

=== Doubles: 78 (36 titles, 42 runner-ups) ===
Legend
Grand Slam (1–2)
WTA Finals (0–3)
Tier I / Premier M & Premier 5 (7–13)
Tier II / Premier / WTA 500 (20–14)
Tier III, IV & V / International (8–10)

Result	W–L	Date	Tournament	Tier	Surface	Partner	Opponents	Score
Loss	0–1	Jul 1998	Prague Open, Czech Republic	Tier III	Clay	(Czech Republic) Michaela Paštiková	(Italy) Silvia Farina Elia (Slovakia) Karina Habšudová	6–2, 1–6, 1–6
Win	1–1	Aug 1998	Warsaw Open, Poland	Tier IV	Clay	(Czech Republic) Helena Vildová	(Sweden) Åsa Carlsson (Netherlands) Seda Noorlander	6–3, 6–2
Loss	1–2	Feb 1999	Ostrava Open, Czech Republic	Tier IV	Clay	(Czech Republic) Helena Vildová	(France) Alexandra Fusai (France) Nathalie Tauziat	6–3, 2–6, 1–6
Win	2–2	Apr 2001	Estoril Open, Portugal	Tier IV	Clay	(Germany) Barbara Rittner	(Slovenia) Tina Križan (Slovenia) Katarina Srebotnik	6–3, 6–2
Loss	2–3	May 2001	Hamburg European Open, Germany	Tier II	Clay	(Germany) Barbara Rittner	(Zimbabwe) Cara Black (Russia) Elena Likhovtseva	2–6, 6–4, 2–6
Loss	2–4	Sep 2001	Sparkassen Cup, Germany	Tier II	Hard (i)	(Germany) Barbara Rittner	(Russia) Elena Likhovtseva (France) Nathalie Tauziat	4–6, 2–6
Loss	2–5	Jan 2002	Auckland Open, New Zealand	Tier V	Hard	(Slovakia) Henrieta Nagyová	(United States) Nicole Arendt (South Africa) Liezel Huber	5–7, 4–6
Loss	2–6	Oct 2002	Luxembourg Open	Tier III	Hard (i)	(Germany) Barbara Rittner	(Belgium) Kim Clijsters (Slovakia) Janette Husárová	6–4, 3–6, 5–7
Win	3–6	Feb 2005	Open GdF Paris, France	Tier II	Carpet (i)	(Czech Republic) Iveta Benešová	(Spain) Anabel Medina Garrigues (Russia) Dinara Safina	6–2, 2–6, 6–2
Loss	3–7	Apr 2005	Amelia Island Championships, United States	Tier II	Clay (green)	(Czech Republic) Iveta Benešová	(Australia) Bryanne Stewart (Australia) Samantha Stosur	4–6, 2–6
Loss	3–8	Apr 2005	Charleston Open, United States	Tier I	Clay (green)	(Czech Republic) Iveta Benešová	(Spain) Conchita Martínez (Spain) Virginia Ruano Pascual	1–6, 4–6
Loss	3–9	Jul 2005	Cincinnati Open, United States	Tier III	Hard	(Argentina) María Emilia Salerni	(United States) Laura Granville (United States) Abigail Spears	6–3, 2–6, 4–6
Loss	3–10	Oct 2005	Stuttgart Open, Germany	Tier II	Hard (i)	(Italy) Francesca Schiavone	(Slovakia) Daniela Hantuchová (Russia) Anastasia Myskina	0–6, 6–3, 5–7
Win	4–10	Oct 2005	Linz Open, Austria	Tier II	Hard (i)	(Argentina) Gisela Dulko	(Spain) Conchita Martínez (Spain) Virginia Ruano Pascual	6–2, 6–3
Win	5–10	Feb 2006	Open GdF Paris, France	Tier II	Carpet (i)	(France) Émilie Loit	(Zimbabwe) Cara Black (Australia) Rennae Stubbs	7–6^{(7–5)}, 6–4
Win	6–10	Feb 2006	Dubai Championships, UAE	Tier II	Hard	(Italy) Francesca Schiavone	(Russia) Svetlana Kuznetsova (Russia) Nadia Petrova	3–6, 7–6^{(7–1)}, 6–3
Loss	6–11	May 2006	Italian Open	Tier I	Clay	(Italy) Francesca Schiavone	(Slovakia) Daniela Hantuchová (Japan) Ai Sugiyama	6–3, 3–6, 1–6
Win	7–11	Oct 2006	Luxembourg Open	Tier II	Hard (i)	(Italy) Francesca Schiavone	(Germany) Anna-Lena Grönefeld (South Africa) Liezel Huber	2–6, 6–4, 6–1
Win	8–11	Oct 2006	Kremlin Cup, Russia	Tier I	Carpet (i)	(Italy) Francesca Schiavone	(Czech Republic) Iveta Benešová (Russia) Galina Voskoboeva	6–4, 6–7^{(4–7)}, 6–1
Loss	8–12	Jul 2007	Eastbourne International, United Kingdom	Tier II	Grass	(Australia) Rennae Stubbs	(United States) Lisa Raymond (Australia) Samantha Stosur	7–6^{(7–5)}, 4–6, 3–6
Win	9–12	Aug 2007	LA Championships, United States	Tier II	Hard	(Australia) Rennae Stubbs	(Australia) Alicia Molik (Italy) Mara Santangelo	6–0, 6–1
Win	10–12	Oct 2007	Stuttgart Open, Germany	Tier II	Hard (i)	(Australia) Rennae Stubbs	(Chinese Taipei) Chan Yung-jan (Russia) Dinara Safina	6–7^{(5–7)}, 7–6^{(7–4)}, [10–2]
Win	11–12	Oct 2007	Zürich Open, Switzerland	Tier I	Hard (i)	(Australia) Rennae Stubbs	(United States) Lisa Raymond (Italy) Francesca Schiavone	7–5, 7–6^{(7–1)}
Loss	11–13	Feb 2008	Diamond Games, Belgium	Tier II	Hard (i)	(Japan) Ai Sugiyama	(Zimbabwe) Cara Black (United States) Liezel Huber	1–6, 3–6
Win	12–13	Feb 2008	Qatar Open	Tier I	Hard	(Australia) Rennae Stubbs	(Zimbabwe) Cara Black (United States) Liezel Huber	6–1, 5–7, [10–7]
Loss	12–14	Jul 2008	Eastbourne International, United Kingdom	Tier II	Grass	(Australia) Rennae Stubbs	(Zimbabwe) Cara Black (United States) Liezel Huber	6–2, 0–6, [8–10]
Win	13–14	Aug 2008	Connecticut Open, United States	Tier II	Hard	(United States) Lisa Raymond	(Romania) Sorana Cîrstea (Romania) Monica Niculescu	4–6, 7–5, [10–7]
Loss	13–15	Oct 2008	Stuttgart Open, Germany	Tier II	Hard (i)	(Australia) Rennae Stubbs	(Germany) Anna-Lena Grönefeld (Switzerland) Patty Schnyder	2–6, 4–6
Loss	13–16	Nov 2008	WTA Championships, Qatar	WTA Finals	Hard	(Australia) Rennae Stubbs	(Zimbabwe) Cara Black (United States) Liezel Huber	1–6, 5–7
Loss	13–17	Feb 2009	Open GdF Paris, France	Premier	Hard (i)	(United States) Lisa Raymond	(Zimbabwe) Cara Black (United States) Liezel Huber	4–6 6–3, [4–10]
Loss	13–18	Mar 2009	Miami Open, United States	Premier M	Hard	(United States) Lisa Raymond	(Russia) Svetlana Kuznetsova (France) Amélie Mauresmo	6–4 3–6, [3–10]
Loss	13–19	Apr 2009	Amelia Island Championships, United States	International	Clay (green)	(United States) Lisa Raymond	(Chinese Taipei) Chuang Chia-jung (India) Sania Mirza	3–6, 6–4, [7–10]
Loss	13–20	May 2009	Madrid Open, Spain	Premier M	Clay	(United States) Lisa Raymond	(Zimbabwe) Cara Black (United States) Liezel Huber	6–4 3–6, [6–10]
Win	14–20	Jan 2010	Hobart International, Australia	International	Hard	(Chinese Taipei) Chuang Chia-jung	(Chinese Taipei) Chan Yung-jan (Romania) Monica Niculescu	3–6, 6–3, [10–7]
Loss	14–21	Feb 2010	Dubai Championships, UAE	Premier 5	Hard	(Slovenia) Katarina Srebotnik	(Spain) Nuria Llagostera Vives; (Spain) María José Martínez Sánchez	6–7^{(5–7)}, 4–6
Win	15–21	Mar 2010	Indian Wells Open, United States	Premier M	Hard	(Slovenia) Katarina Srebotnik	(Russia) Nadia Petrova (Australia) Samantha Stosur	6–4, 2–6, [10–5]
Loss	15–22	Apr 2010	Stuttgart Open, Germany	Premier	Hard	(Slovenia) Katarina Srebotnik	(Argentina) Gisela Dulko; (Italy) Flavia Pennetta	6–3, 6–7^{(3–7)}, [5–10]
Loss	15–23	May 2010	French Open	Grand Slam	Clay	(Slovenia) Katarina Srebotnik	(United States) Serena Williams; (United States) Venus Williams	2–6, 3–6
Loss	15–24	Jun 2010	Eastbourne International, UK	Premier	Grass	(Slovenia) Katarina Srebotnik	(United States) Lisa Raymond; (Australia) Rennae Stubbs	6–2, 2–6, [11–13]
Loss	15–25	Aug 2010	Canadian Open	Premier 5	Hard	(Slovenia) Katarina Srebotnik	(Argentina) Gisela Dulko; (Italy) Flavia Pennetta	5–7, 6–3, [10–12]
Win	16–25	Aug 2010	Connecticut Open, United States	Premier	Hard	(Slovenia) Katarina Srebotnik	(United States) Bethanie Mattek-Sands; (United States) Meghann Shaughnessy	7–5, 6–0
Loss	16–26	Oct 2010	Linz Open, Austria	International	Hard (i)	(Slovenia) Katarina Srebotnik	(Czech Republic) Renata Voráčová; (Czech Republic) Barbora Záhlavová-Strýcová	5–7, 6–7^{(6–8)}
Loss	16–27	Oct 2010	WTA Championships, Qatar	WTA Finals	Hard	(Slovenia) Katarina Srebotnik	(Argentina) Gisela Dulko; (Italy) Flavia Pennetta	5–7, 4–6
Win	17–27	Jan 2011	Auckland Open, New Zealand	International	Hard	(Slovenia) Katarina Srebotnik	(Sweden) Sofia Arvidsson; (New Zealand) Marina Erakovic	6–3, 6–0
Loss	17–28	Jan 2011	Sydney International, Australia	Premier	Hard	(Slovenia) Katarina Srebotnik	(Czech Republic) Iveta Benešová; (Czech Republic) Barbora Záhlavová-Strýcová	6–4, 4–6, [7–10]
Loss	17–29	Feb 2011	Dubai Championships, UAE	Premier 5	Hard	(Slovenia) Katarina Srebotnik	(United States) Liezel Huber; (Spain) María José Martínez Sánchez	6–7^{(5–7)}, 3–6
Win	18–29	Feb 2011	Qatar Open	Premier	Hard	(Slovenia) Katarina Srebotnik	(United States) Liezel Huber (Russia) Nadia Petrova	7–5, 6–7^{(2–7)}, [10–8]
Loss	18–30	May 2011	Madrid Open, Spain	Premier M	Clay	(Slovenia) Katarina Srebotnik	(Belarus) Victoria Azarenka (Russia) Maria Kirilenko	4–6, 3–6
Win	19–30	Jun 2011	Eastbourne International, United Kingdom	Premier	Grass	(Slovenia) Katarina Srebotnik	(United States) Liezel Huber (United States) Lisa Raymond	6–3, 6–0
Win	20–30	Jun 2011	Wimbledon, United Kingdom	Grand Slam	Grass	(Slovenia) Katarina Srebotnik	(Germany) Sabine Lisicki (Australia) Samantha Stosur	6–3, 6–1
Win	21–30	Aug 2011	Southern California Open, United States	Premier	Hard	(Slovenia) Katarina Srebotnik	(United States) Raquel Kops-Jones (United States) Abigail Spears	6–0, 6–2
Win	22–30	Oct 2011	China Open	Premier M	Hard	(Slovenia) Katarina Srebotnik	(Argentina) Gisela Dulko (Italy) Flavia Pennetta	6–3, 6–4
Loss	22–31	Oct 2011	WTA Championships, Istanbul	WTA Finals	Hard (i)	(Slovenia) Katarina Srebotnik	(United States) Liezel Huber; (United States) Lisa Raymond	4–6, 4–6
Win	23–31	Jan 2012	Sydney International, Australia	Premier	Hard	(Slovenia) Katarina Srebotnik	(United States) Liezel Huber (United States) Lisa Raymond	6–1, 4–6, [13–11]
Loss	23–32	Sep 2012	Pan Pacific Open, Japan	Premier 5	Hard	(Germany) Anna-Lena Grönefeld	(United States) Raquel Kops-Jones (United States) Abigail Spears	1–6, 4–6
Win	24–32	Oct 2012	Linz Open, Austria	International	Hard (i)	(Germany) Anna-Lena Grönefeld	(Germany) Julia Görges (Czech Republic) Barbora Záhlavová-Strýcová	6–3, 6–4
Loss	24–33	Jan 2013	Brisbane International, Australia	Premier	Hard	(Germany) Anna-Lena Grönefeld	(United States) Bethanie Mattek-Sands (India) Sania Mirza	6–4, 4–6, [7–10]
Win	25–33	May 2013	Brussels Open, Belgium	Premier	Clay	(Germany) Anna-Lena Grönefeld	(Canada) Gabriela Dabrowski (Israel) Shahar Pe'er	6–0, 6–3
Loss	25–34	Jun 2013	Nuremberg Cup, Germany	International	Clay	(Germany) Anna-Lena Grönefeld	(Romania) Raluca Olaru (Russia) Valeriya Solovyeva	6–2, 6–7^{(3–7)}, [9–11]
Loss	25–35	Aug 2013	Canadian Open	Premier 5	Hard	(Germany) Anna-Lena Grönefeld	(Serbia) Jelena Janković (Slovenia) Katarina Srebotnik	7–5, 2–6, [6-10]
Loss	25–36	Aug 2013	Cincinnati Open, United States	Premier 5	Hard	(Germany) Anna-Lena Grönefeld	(Chinese Taipei) Hsieh Su-wei (China) Peng Shuai	6–2, 3–6, [10-12]
Win	26–36	Feb 2014	Open GdF Paris, France	Premier	Hard (i)	(Germany) Anna-Lena Grönefeld	(Hungary) Tímea Babos (France) Kristina Mladenovic	6–7^{(7–9)}, 6–4, [10-5]
Loss	26–37	Feb 2014	Qatar Open	Premier 5	Hard	(Slovenia) Katarina Srebotnik	(Chinese Taipei) Hsieh Su-wei (China) Peng Shuai	4–6, 0–6
Win	27–37	May 2014	Italian Open	Premier 5	Clay	(Slovenia) Katarina Srebotnik	(Italy) Sara Errani (Italy) Roberta Vinci	4–0, retired
Loss	27–38	Oct 2016	Linz Open, Austria	International	Hard (i)	(Germany) Anna-Lena Grönefeld	(Netherlands) Kiki Bertens; (Sweden) Johanna Larsson	6–4, 2–6, [7-10]
Win	28–38	May 2017	Prague Open, Czech Republic	International	Clay	(Germany) Anna-Lena Grönefeld	(Czech Republic) Lucie Hradecká (Czech Republic) Kateřina Siniaková	6–4, 7–6^{(7–3)}
Loss	28–39	Aug 2017	Canadian Open	Premier 5	Hard	(Germany) Anna-Lena Grönefeld	(Russia) Ekaterina Makarova (Russia) Elena Vesnina	0–6, 4–6
Loss	28–40	Apr 2018	Stuttgart Open, Germany	Premier	Clay (i)	(United States) Nicole Melichar-Martinez	(United States) Raquel Atawo (Germany) Anna-Lena Grönefeld	4–6, 7–6^{(7–5)}, [5-10]
Win	29–40	May 2018	Prague Open, Czech Republic	International	Clay	(United States) Nicole Melichar-Martinez	(Romania) Mihaela Buzărnescu (Belarus) Lidziya Marozava	6–4, 6–2
Loss	29–41	Jul 2018	Wimbledon, United Kingdom	Grand Slam	Grass	(United States) Nicole Melichar-Martinez	(Czech Republic) Barbora Krejčíková (Czech Republic) Kateřina Siniaková	4–6, 6–4, 0–6
Win	30–41	Aug 2018	Silicon Valley Classic, United States	Premier	Hard	(Chinese Taipei) Latisha Chan	(Ukraine) Lyudmyla Kichenok (Ukraine) Nadiia Kichenok	6–4, 6–1
Win	31–41	Oct 2018	Tianjin Open, China	International	Hard	(United States) Nicole Melichar-Martinez	(Australia) Monique Adamczak (Australia) Jessica Moore	6–4, 6–2
Win	32–41	Jan 2019	Brisbane International, Australia	Premier	Hard	(United States) Nicole Melichar-Martinez	(Chinese Taipei) Chan Hao-ching (Chinese Taipei) Latisha Chan	6–1, 6–1
Loss	32–42	May 2019	Prague Open, Czech Republic	International	Clay	(United States) Nicole Melichar-Martinez	(Russia) Anna Kalinskaya (Slovakia) Viktória Kužmová	6–4, 5–7, [7-10]
Win	33–42	Aug 2019	Silicon Valley Classic, United States	Premier	Hard	(United States) Nicole Melichar-Martinez	(Japan) Shuko Aoyama (Japan) Ena Shibahara	6–4, 6–4
Win	34–42	Sep 2019	Zhengzhou Open, China	Premier	Hard	(United States) Nicole Melichar-Martinez	(Belgium) Yanina Wickmayer (Slovenia) Tamara Zidanšek	6–1, 7–6^{(7–2)}
Win	35–42	Aug 2020	Cincinnati Open, United States	Premier 5	Hard	(Netherlands) Demi Schuurs	(United States) Nicole Melichar-Martinez (China) Xu Yifan	6–1, 4–6, [10-4]
Win	36–42	Oct 2021	Chicago Classic, United States	WTA 500	Hard	(Germany) Andrea Petkovic	(United States) Caroline Dolehide (United States) CoCo Vandeweghe	6–3, 6–1

== ITF Circuit finals ==
=== Singles: 16 (10 titles, 6 runner–ups) ===
Legend
75K tournaments
50K tournaments
25K tournaments
10K tournaments

Result	W–L	Date	Tournament	Tier	Surface	Opponent	Score
Loss	0–1	May 1992	ITF San Severino, Italy	10K	Clay	(Poland) Karolina Bulat	5–7, 4–6
Loss	0–2	Aug 1992	ITF Massa, Italy	10K	Clay	(Romania) Andreea Ehritt-Vanc	1–6, 2–6
Loss	0–3	Oct 1992	ITF Burgdorf, Switzerland	10K	Clay	(Australia) Kristin Godridge	6–7, 4–6
Win	1–3	Oct 1992	ITF Langenthal, Switzerland	10K	Hard (i)	(Germany) Nicole Gadanyi	6–2, 6–3
Win	2–3	Dec 1993	ITF Vítkovice, Czech Republic	10K	Hard	(Czech Republic) Sylvia Štefková	6–4, 6–3
Loss	2–4	Jul 1995	ITF Darmstadt, Germany	25K	Clay	(United States) Annie Miller	6–3, 4–6, 2–6
Win	3–4	Dec 1996	ITF Vítkovice, Czech Republic	10K	Carpet (i)	(Czech Republic) Jana Macurová	6–2, 6–3
Win	4–4	Dec 1996	ITF Přerov, Czech Republic	10K	Carpet (i)	(Hungary) Nóra Köves	6–2, 6–3
Loss	4–5	Oct 1997	ITF Flensburg, Germany	25K	Carpet (i)	(Germany) Syna Schreiber	4–6, 4–6
Win	5–5	Feb 1998	ITF Rogaska Slatina, Slovenia	25K	Carpet (i)	(United States) Meghann Shaughnessy	6–2, 3–6, 6–4
Loss	5–6	Mar 1998	ITF Biel, Switzerland	25K	Hard (i)	(Belgium) Nancy Feber	7-6^{(6)}, 3–6, 4-6
Win	6–6	May 1997	ITF Cardiff, United Kingdom	50K	Clay	(Israel) Anna Smashnova	7–5, 6–4
Win	7–6	Oct 1999	ITF Poitiers, France	75K	Hard (i)	(Switzerland) Marie-Gaïané Mikaelian	4–6, 6–4, 6–2
Win	8–6	Sep2004	ITF Biella, Italy	50K	Clay	(France) Virginie Razzano	6–1, 6–1
Win	9–6	Oct 2004	ITF Joué-lès-Tours, France	25K	Carpet (i)	(Madagascar) Dally Randriantefy	6–3, 6–2
Win	10–6	Nov 2004	ITF Deauville, France	50K	Carpet (i)	(Ukraine) Alona Bondarenko	6–0, 6–3

=== Doubles: 12 (8 titles, 4 runner-ups) ===
Legend
75K tournaments
50K tournaments
25K tournaments
10K tournaments

Result	W–L	Date	Tournament	Tier	Surface	Partner	Opponents	Score
Win	1–0	Aug 1992	ITF La Spezia, Italy	10K	Clay	(Slovenia) Tina Vukasovič	(Italy) Marzia Grossi (Italy) Laura Lapi	7–5, 2–6, 6–2
Win	2–0	Aug 1993	ITF Sopot, Poland	75K	Clay	(Slovenia) Tina Križan	(Slovakia) Denisa Krajčovičová (Slovakia) Katarína Studeníková	6–3, 6–1
Win	3–0	Sep 1993	ITF Klagenfurt, Austria	25K	Clay	(Czech Republic) Jana Pospíšilová	(Czech Republic) Ivana Jankovská (Czech Republic) Eva Melicharová	6–4, 7–6
Win	4–0	Dec 1993	ITF Vítkovice, Czech Republic	10K	Hard (i)	(Czech Republic) Dominika Gorecká	(Czech Republic) Ivana Jankovská (Czech Republic) Eva Melicharová	7–5, 2–6, 7–6
Loss	4–1	Mar 1994	ITF Prostějov, Czech Republic	25K	Hard (i)	(Czech Republic) Jana Pospíšilová	(Netherlands) Lara Bitter (Netherlands) Maaike Koutstaal	5–7, 3–6
Win	5–1	Jul 1995	ITF Darmstadt, Germany	25K	Clay	(Bulgaria) Svetlana Krivencheva	(Poland) Magdalena Feistel (Czech Republic) Helena Vildová	7–6^{(4)}, 6–2
Win	6–1	Sep 1995	ITF Karlovy Vary, Czech Republic	25K	Clay	(Slovakia) Simona Galiková	(Hungary) Andrea Noszály (Czech Republic) Radka Pelikánová	6–3, 6–4
Loss	6–2	Aug 1996	ITF Budapest, Hungary	25K	Clay	(Czech Republic) Jana Macurová	(Germany) Syna Schreiber (Germany) Fruzsina Siklosi	2–6, 1–6
Loss	6–3	Oct 1996	ITF Flensburg, Germany	25K	Carpet (i)	(Poland) Magdalena Feistel	(Sweden) Annica Lindstedt (Sweden) Anna-Karin Svensson	4–6, 2–6
Win	7–3	Dec 1998	ITF Titisee-Neustadt, Germany	50K	Carpet (i)	(Czech Republic) Helena Vildová	(Germany) Anca Barna (Germany) Adriana Barna	6–4, 6–3
Win	8–3	Oct2004	ITF Joué-lès-Tours, France	25K	Carpet (i)	(Germany) Angelika Rösch	(France) Stéphanie Cohen-Aloro (Tunisia) Selima Sfar	w/o
Loss	8–4	Nov 2004	ITF Deauville, France	50K	Clay (i)	(Germany) Vanessa Henke	(Hungary) Virág Németh (Israel) Tzipora Obziler	4–6, 1–6
