= 1998 WTA German Open =

- Date: 11–17 May
- Edition: 87th
- Category: Tier I
- Draw: 56S / 28D
- Prize money: $926,250
- Surface: Clay / outdoor
- Location: Berlin, Germany
- Venue: Rot-Weiss Tennis Club

Champions

Singles
- (Spain) Conchita Martínez

Doubles
- (United States) Lindsay Davenport / (Belarus) Natasha Zvereva
- WTA German Open

The 1998 WTA German Open was a women's tennis tournament played on outdoor clay courts at the Rot-Weiss Tennis Club in Berlin in Germany that was part of Tier I of the 1998 WTA Tour. It was the 87th edition of the tournament and was held from 11 May through 17 May 1998. Seventh-seeded Conchita Martínez won the singles title.

== Finals ==
=== Singles ===
(Spain) Conchita Martínez defeated (France) Amélie Mauresmo 6–4, 6–4

- It was Martínez's 2nd title of the year and the 35th of her career.

=== Doubles ===
(United States) Lindsay Davenport / (Belarus) Natasha Zvereva defeated (France) Alexandra Fusai / (France) Nathalie Tauziat 6–3, 6–0

- It was Davenport's 3rd title of the year and the 34th of her career. It was Zvereva's 2nd title of the year and the 75th of her career.
