= 2007 Acura Classic =

- Date: July 30 – August 5
- Edition: 29th
- Category: Tier I
- Draw: 56S / 28D
- Prize money: USD 1,340,000
- Surface: Hard / outdoor
- Location: San Diego, California, U.S.
- Venue: La Costa Resort and Spa

Champions

Singles
- (Russia) Maria Sharapova

Doubles
- (Zimbabwe) Cara Black / (United States) Liezel Huber
- Southern California Open

The 2007 Acura Classic was a women's tennis tournament played on outdoor hard courts at the La Costa Resort and Spa in San Diego in the United States which was part of Tier I of the 2007 WTA Tour. It was the 29th edition of the tournament and was held from July 30 through August 5, 2007. First-seeded Maria Sharapova won the singles title and earned $181,980 first-prize money as well as 430 ranking points.

== Finals ==
=== Singles ===
(Russia) Maria Sharapova defeated (Switzerland) Patty Schnyder, 6–2, 3–6, 6–0

- It was Sharapova's only title of the year and the 16th of her career.

=== Doubles ===
(Zimbabwe) Cara Black / (United States) Liezel Huber defeated (Belarus) Victoria Azarenka / (Russia) Anna Chakvetadze 7–5, 6–4

- It was Black's 6th title of the year and the 43rd of her career. It was Huber's 6th title of the year and the 21st of her career.
