= 2000 WTA German Open =

- Date: 8–14 May
- Edition: 89th
- Category: Tier I
- Draw: 56S / 28D
- Prize money: $1,080,000
- Surface: Clay / outdoor
- Location: Berlin, Germany
- Venue: Rot-Weiss Tennis Club

Champions

Singles
- (Spain) Conchita Martínez

Doubles
- (Spain) Conchita Martínez / (Spain) Arantxa Sánchez Vicario
- WTA German Open

The 2000 German Open was a women's tennis event that was played in Berlin, Germany from 8 May to 14 May 2000. It was one of two Tier I events that took place on red clay in the build-up to the second Grand Slam of the year, the French Open. Third-seeded Conchita Martínez won the singles title and earned $166,000 first-prize money.

== Finals ==
=== Singles ===
(Spain) Conchita Martínez defeated (South Africa) Amanda Coetzer 6–1, 6–2

=== Doubles ===
(Spain) Conchita Martínez / (Spain) Arantxa Sanchez-Vicario defeated (South Africa) Amanda Coetzer / (United States) Corina Morariu 3–6, 6–2, 7–6^{(9–7)}

== Prize money ==
Event	W	F	SF	QF	Round of 16	Round of 32	Round of 64
Singles	$166,000	$80,000	$38,000	$18,000	$8,900	$5,500	$3,500
