= 1999 WTA German Open – Singles =

Singles
- 1999 WTA German Open

Final
- Champion: (Switzerland) Martina Hingis
- Runner-up: (France) Julie Halard-Decugis
- Score: 6–0, 6–1

Details
- Draw: 56
- Seeds: 16

Events
Singles	Doubles
← 1998 ·	WTA German Open	· 2000 →

Martina Hingis defeated Julie Halard-Decugis in the final, 6–0, 6–1 to win the singles tennis title at the 1999 WTA German Open.

Conchita Martínez was the defending champion, but lost in the third round to Arantxa Sánchez Vicario.

== Seeds ==
The top eight seeds received a bye to the second round.

1. (Switzerland) Martina Hingis (champion)
2. (Czech Republic) Jana Novotná (second round)
3. (Germany) Steffi Graf (quarterfinals)
4. (Spain) Arantxa Sánchez Vicario (semifinals)
5. (France) ~~Mary Pierce~~ (withdrew)
6. (France) Nathalie Tauziat (third round)
7. (United States) Serena Williams (quarterfinals, retired)
8. (Switzerland) Patty Schnyder (quarterfinals)
9. (Russia) Anna Kournikova (first round)
10. (South Africa) Amanda Coetzer (first round)
11. (Belgium) Dominique Van Roost (second round)
12. (France) Amélie Mauresmo (third round)
13. (Romania) Irina Spîrlea (first round, retired)
14. (Spain) Conchita Martínez (third round)
15. (Belarus) Natasha Zvereva (first round)
16. (Austria) Barbara Schett (quarterfinals)

== Draw ==
=== Key ===
- Q = Qualifier
- WC = Wild card
- LL = Lucky loser
- Alt = Alternate
- SE = Special exempt
- PR = Protected ranking
- ITF = ITF entry
- JE = Junior exempt
- w/o = Walkover
- r = Retired
- d = Defaulted
- SR = Special ranking

=== Finals ===
Quarterfinals
1	(Switzerland) Martina Hingis	7	7
16	(Austria) Barbara Schett	5	5
4	(Spain) Arantxa Sánchez Vicario	6	3
7	(United States) Serena Williams	3	2^{r}
(France) Julie Halard-Decugis	5	6	6
3	(Germany) Steffi Graf	7	4	4
8	(Switzerland) Patty Schnyder	6	1	1
(Romania) Ruxandra Dragomir	3	6	6

Semifinals
1	(Switzerland) Martina Hingis	6	6
4	(Spain) Arantxa Sánchez Vicario	4	0
(France) Julie Halard-Decugis	6	6
(Romania) Ruxandra Dragomir	2	2

Final
1	(Switzerland) Martina Hingis	6	6
(France) Julie Halard-Decugis	0	1

=== Top half ===
==== Section 1 ====
First round
(Spain) G León García	6	6
(Japan) A Sugiyama	1	2
Q	(Italy) G Di Natale	2	2
(Russia) E Likhovtseva	6	6
WC	(Germany) J Kandarr	2	1
11	(Belgium) D Van Roost	6	6
16	(Austria) B Schett	6	5	6
(South Africa) M de Swardt	4	7	2
LL	(Argentina) M Díaz Oliva	4	2
Q	(Germany) M Schnitzer	6	6
(United States) T Snyder	4	1
(Italy) S Farina	6	6

Second round
1	(Switzerland) M Hingis	6	6
(Spain) G León García	3	2
(Russia) E Likhovtseva	6	7
11	(Belgium) D Van Roost	3	5
16	(Austria) B Schett	6	6
Q	(Germany) M Schnitzer	0	3
(Italy) S Farina	2	3
6	(France) N Tauziat	6	6

Third round
1	(Switzerland) M Hingis	6	6
(Russia) E Likhovtseva	4	1
16	(Austria) B Schett	6	4	7^{7}
6	(France) N Tauziat	1	6	6^{5}

Quarterfinals
1	(Switzerland) M Hingis	7	7
16	(Austria) B Schett	5	5

==== Section 2 ====
First round
(United States) C Morariu	7^{7}	6
Q	(Germany) S Klösel	6^{4}	4
Q	(Czech Republic) S Kleinová	6	6
(Austria) S Plischke	4	1
(France) A-G Sidot	6^{5}	2
14	(Spain) C Martínez	7^{7}	6
9	(Russia) A Kournikova	7^{7}	4	6^{5}
(United States) M J Fernández	6^{4}	6	7^{7}
(United States) C Rubin	3	6^{2}
(United States) L Raymond	6	7^{7}
LL	(Netherlands) A Hopmans	4	6	1
WC	(United States) J Capriati	6	4	6

Second round
4	(Spain) A Sánchez Vicario	7^{7}	6^{3}	7^{8}
(United States) C Morariu	6^{0}	7^{7}	6^{6}
Q	(Czech Republic) S Kleinová	4	0
14	(Spain) C Martínez	6	6
(United States) M J Fernández	6	1	0
(United States) L Raymond	3	6	6
(United States) J Capriati	6^{3}	3
7	(United States) S Williams	7^{7}	6

Third round
4	(Spain) A Sánchez Vicario	6	0	7
14	(Spain) C Martínez	1	6	5
(United States) L Raymond	1	6^{1}
7	(United States) S Williams	6	7^{7}

Quarterfinals
4	(Spain) A Sánchez Vicario	6	3
7	(United States) S Williams	3	2^{r}

=== Bottom half ===
==== Section 3 ====
First round
(France) A Fusai	4	1
(Germany) A Huber	6	6
(United States) B Rippner	6^{5}	2
(France) J Halard-Decugis	7^{7}	6
(Germany) A Glass	6	2	3
15	(Belarus) N Zvereva	3	6	6
13	(Romania) I Spîrlea	4	0^{r}
(Zimbabwe) C Black	6	1
Q	(United States) S Cacic	7^{7}	6^{2}	6
Q	(Germany) A Barna	6^{2}	7^{7}	1
Q	(Federal Republic of Yugoslavia) S Naćuk	6	4	6
(Ukraine) E Tatarkova	3	6	3

Second round
LL	(Bulgaria) P Stoyanova	4	6	6
(Germany) A Huber	6	4	4
(France) J Halard-Decugis	6	6
15	(Belarus) N Zvereva	2	0
(Zimbabwe) C Black	6	6
Q	(United States) S Cacic	0	1
Q	(Federal Republic of Yugoslavia) S Naćuk	6	3	4
3	(Germany) S Graf	2	6	6

Third round
LL	(Bulgaria) P Stoyanova	1	0
(France) J Halard-Decugis	6	6
(Zimbabwe) C Black	6^{5}	2
3	(Germany) S Graf	7^{7}	6

Quarterfinals
(France) J Halard-Decugis	5	6	6
3	(Germany) S Graf	7	4	4

==== Section 4 ====
First round
(Germany) B Rittner	6	6
(Czech Republic) K Hrdličková	3	3
(Germany) M Weingärtner	0	0
(Israel) A Smashnova	6	6
(Slovakia) H Nagyová	6	6
10	(South Africa) A Coetzer	4	1
12	(France) A Mauresmo	6	6
Q	(Switzerland) E Gagliardi	4	3
(Russia) T Panova	4	6^{3}
WC	(Germany) J Abe	6	7^{7}
(Romania) R Dragomir	6	6
LL	(Argentina) F Labat	3	1

Second round
8	(Switzerland) P Schnyder	6	6
(Germany) B Rittner	4	4
(Israel) A Smashnova	3	6	6
(Slovakia) H Nagyová	6	4	0
12	(France) A Mauresmo	7	4	6
WC	(Germany) J Abe	5	6	2
(Romania) R Dragomir	7^{7}	6
2	(Czech Republic) J Novotná	6^{4}	2

Third round
8	(Switzerland) P Schnyder	2	7^{7}	6
(Israel) A Smashnova	6	6^{3}	1
12	(France) A Mauresmo	2	5
(Romania) R Dragomir	6	7

Quarterfinals
8	(Switzerland) P Schnyder	6	1	1
(Romania) R Dragomir	3	6	6

== Qualifying ==
=== Seeds ===
1. (Switzerland) Emmanuelle Gagliardi (qualifier)
2. (Netherlands) Amanda Hopmans (qualifying competition, lucky loser)
3. (Argentina) Mariana Díaz Oliva (qualifying competition, lucky loser)
4. (Australia) Alicia Molik (first round)
5. (Latvia) Larisa Neiland (first round)
6. (Russia) Evgenia Kulikovskaya (first round)
7. (Czech Republic) Sandra Kleinová (qualifier)
8. (Canada) Sonya Jeyaseelan (first round)

=== Qualifiers ===
1. (Switzerland) Emmanuelle Gagliardi
2. (Czech Republic) Sandra Kleinová
3. (Federal Republic of Yugoslavia) Sandra Naćuk
4. (United States) Sandra Cacic
5. (Italy) Germana Di Natale
6. (Germany) Sandra Klösel
7. (Germany) Miriam Schnitzer
8. (Germany) Anca Barna

=== Lucky losers ===
1. (Argentina) Mariana Díaz Oliva
2. (Argentina) Florencia Labat
3. (Bulgaria) Pavlina Stoyanova
4. (Netherlands) Amanda Hopmans

== Qualifying draw ==
=== Key ===
- Q = Qualifier
- WC = Wild card
- LL = Lucky loser
- Alt = Alternate
- SE = Special exempt
- PR = Protected ranking
- ITF = ITF entry
- JE = Junior exempt
- w/o = Walkover
- r = Retired
- d = Defaulted
- SR = Special ranking

=== First qualifier ===
First round
1	(Switzerland) Emmanuelle Gagliardi	6	6
(Czech Republic) Radka Pelikánová	4	3
WC	(Germany) Mia Buric	3	1
(Italy) Flora Perfetti	6	6

Qualifying competition
1	(Switzerland) Emmanuelle Gagliardi	6	3	6
(Italy) Flora Perfetti	4	6	1

=== Second qualifier ===
First round
(Czech Republic) Adriana Gerši	1	1
(Russia) Elena Dementieva	6	6
WC	(Germany) Martina Müller	6	3	3
7	(Czech Republic) Sandra Kleinová	1	6	6

Qualifying competition
(Russia) Elena Dementieva	3	4
7	(Czech Republic) Sandra Kleinová	6	6

=== Third qualifier ===
First round
3	(Argentina) Mariana Díaz Oliva	6	6
WC	(Germany) Angelika Rösch	2	2
(Federal Republic of Yugoslavia) Sandra Naćuk	6	6
(Australia) Kerry-Anne Guse	2	1

Qualifying competition
3	(Argentina) Mariana Díaz Oliva	3	3
(Federal Republic of Yugoslavia) Sandra Naćuk	6	6

=== Fourth qualifier ===
First round
(United States) Sandra Cacic	6	6
(Argentina) María José Gaidano	3	1
(South Africa) Liezel Horn	6	6
5	(Latvia) Larisa Neiland	3	4

Qualifying competition
(United States) Sandra Cacic	7	3	6
(South Africa) Liezel Horn	5	6	3

=== Fifth qualifier ===
First round
8	(Canada) Sonya Jeyaseelan	3	1
(Italy) Germana Di Natale	6	6
(United States) Samantha Reeves	2	3
(Spain) Alicia Ortuño	6	6

Qualifying competition
(Italy) Germana Di Natale	6	2	7
(Spain) Alicia Ortuño	4	6	5

=== Sixth qualifier ===
First round
(Romania) Raluca Sandu	3	1
(Argentina) Florencia Labat	6	6
(Germany) Sandra Klösel	6	6
4	(Australia) Alicia Molik	4	4

Qualifying competition
(Argentina) Florencia Labat	6	3	2
(Germany) Sandra Klösel	3	6	6

=== Seventh qualifier ===
First round
6	(Russia) Evgenia Kulikovskaya	4	4
(Bulgaria) Pavlina Stoyanova	6	6
(Austria) Sandra Dopfer	6	4	2
(Germany) Miriam Schnitzer	2	6	6

Qualifying competition
(Bulgaria) Pavlina Stoyanova	1	6	1
(Germany) Miriam Schnitzer	6	1	6

=== Eighth qualifier ===
First round
(Germany) Anca Barna	6	6
(Poland) Aleksandra Olsza	3	4
WC	(Germany) Syna Schmidle	3	1
2	(Netherlands) Amanda Hopmans	6	6

Qualifying competition
(Germany) Anca Barna	2	6	6
2	(Netherlands) Amanda Hopmans	6	1	2
