= 2007 Acura Classic – Singles =

Singles
- 2007 Acura Classic

Final
- Champion: (Russia) Maria Sharapova
- Runner-up: (Switzerland) Patty Schnyder
- Score: 6–2, 3–6, 6–0

Details
- Draw: 56
- Seeds: 16

Events
Singles	Doubles
- Acura Classic

Defending champion Maria Sharapova defeated Patty Schnyder in the final, 6–2, 3–6, 6–0 to win the singles tennis title at the 2007 Southern California Open.

== Seeds ==
The top 8 seeds received a bye into the second round.

1. (Russia) Maria Sharapova (champion)
2. (Serbia) Jelena Janković (third round)
3. (Russia) Anna Chakvetadze (semifinals)
4. (Russia) Nadia Petrova (quarterfinals)
5. (France) Marion Bartoli (third round)
6. (Slovakia) Daniela Hantuchová (third round)
7. (Switzerland) Martina Hingis (third round)
8. (Russia) Dinara Safina (third round)
9. (Russia) Elena Dementieva (semifinals)
10. (United States) Venus Williams (quarterfinals)
11. (Switzerland) Patty Schnyder (final)
12. (Israel) Shahar Pe'er (first round)
13. (France) Tatiana Golovin (third round)
14. (Ukraine) Alona Bondarenko (second round)
15. (Austria) Sybille Bammer (second round)
16. (Czech Republic) Lucie Šafářová (second round)

== Draw ==
=== Key ===
- Q = Qualifier
- WC = Wild card
- LL = Lucky loser
- r = Retired
- w/o = Walkover

=== Finals ===
Quarterfinals
1	(Russia) Maria Sharapova	6	6
(India) Sania Mirza	2	1
3	(Russia) Anna Chakvetadze	6^{5}	7^{7}	6
10	(United States) Venus Williams	7^{7}	6^{3}	2
11	(Switzerland) Patty Schnyder	6	6
4	(Russia) Nadia Petrova	4	4
9	(Russia) Elena Dementieva	6	6
(Russia) Maria Kirilenko	2	4

Semifinals
1	(Russia) Maria Sharapova	6	6
3	(Russia) Anna Chakvetadze	3	2
11	(Switzerland) Patty Schnyder	7^{7}	6
9	(Russia) Elena Dementieva	6^{4}	0

Finals
1	(Russia) Maria Sharapova	6	3	6
11	(Switzerland) Patty Schnyder	2	6	0

=== Top half ===
==== Section 1 ====
First round
(United States) L Granville	4	7	4
(Thailand) T Tanasugarn	6	5	6
(Japan) A Morigami	7	4	2
Q	(Luxembourg) A Kremer	5	6	6
(Argentina) G Dulko	1	6	2
13	(France) T Golovin	6	2	6
12	(Israel) S Pe'er	3	6	2
(India) S Mirza	6	4	6
(United States) J Craybas	4	4
(Greece) E Daniilidou	6	6
(France) C Pin	6	4	6
Q	(Belarus) T Poutchek	3	6	2

Second round
1	(Russia) M Sharapova	6	6
(Thailand) T Tanasugarn	1	3
Q	(Luxembourg) A Kremer	1	6	2
13	(France) T Golovin	6	4	6
(India) S Mirza	7^{7}	6
(Greece) E Daniilidou	6^{1}	3
(France) C Pin	1	4
8	(Russia) D Safina	6	6

Third round
1	(Russia) M Sharapova	6	6
13	(France) T Golovin	0	3
(India) S Mirza	6	6
8	(Russia) D Safina	1	2

Quarterfinals
1	(Russia) M Sharapova	6	6
(India) S Mirza	2	1

==== Section 2 ====
First round
(Russia) O Poutchkova	3	1
(United States) M Shaughnessy	6	6
(Japan) A Sugiyama	6	6
(Uzbekistan) A Amanmuradova	3	2
(Ukraine) K Bondarenko	4	6^{5}
15	(Austria) S Bammer	6	7^{7}
10	(United States) V Williams	6	6
(Russia) A Rodionova	3	0
(France) V Razzano	7^{7}	6
Q	(Russia) Y Shvedova	6^{2}	4
(Belarus) V Azarenka	4	6	6
(Chinese Taipei) Y-J Chan	6	3	0

Second round
3	(Russia) A Chakvetadze	6	6
(United States) M Shaughnessy	4	4
(Japan) A Sugiyama	6	7^{7}
15	(Austria) S Bammer	2	6^{3}
10	(United States) V Williams	6	6
(France) V Razzano	2	4
(Belarus) V Azarenka	3	6	1
6	(Slovakia) D Hantuchová	6	1	6

Third round
3	(Russia) A Chakvetadze	6	6
(Japan) A Sugiyama	4	4
10	(United States) V Williams	6	6
6	(Slovakia) D Hantuchová	0	3

Quarterfinals
3	(Russia) A Chakvetadze	6^{5}	7^{7}	6
10	(United States) V Williams	7^{7}	6^{3}	2

=== Bottom half ===
==== Section 3 ====
First round
(Netherlands) M Krajicek	6^{6}	7	6
Q	(Ukraine) Y Fedak	7^{8}	5	2
(Russia) A Kudryavtseva	6	6
(Ukraine) J Vakulenko	1	3
(United States) J Jackson	2	1
11	(Switzerland) P Schnyder	6	6
14	(Ukraine) A Bondarenko	3	6	6
(China) S Peng	6	3	4
(Australia) N Pratt	1	4
(Slovenia) K Srebotnik	6	6
(Russia) E Bovina	6	7
WC	(United States) C Vandeweghe	3	5

Second round
7	(Switzerland) M Hingis	7	6
(Netherlands) M Krajicek	5	2
(Russia) A Kudryavtseva	2	0
11	(Switzerland) P Schnyder	6	6
14	(Ukraine) A Bondarenko	3	1
(Slovenia) K Srebotnik	6	6
(Russia) E Bovina	3	5
4	(Russia) N Petrova	6	7

Third round
7	(Switzerland) M Hingis	1	7^{7}	3
11	(Switzerland) P Schnyder	6	6^{4}	6
(Slovenia) K Srebotnik	3	6^{10}
4	(Russia) N Petrova	6	7^{12}

Quarterfinals
11	(Switzerland) P Schnyder	6	6
4	(Russia) N Petrova	4	4

==== Section 4 ====
First round
(Venezuela) M Sequera	5	r
Q	(Japan) A Nakamura	7
Q	(Germany) A Kerber	6	6
WC	(United States) B Augustine	0	1
WC	(Colombia) C Castaño	4	6	1
9	(Russia) E Dementieva	6	3	6
16	(Czech Republic) L Šafářová	6	6
(United States) M Tu	4	3
(Russia) M Kirilenko	6	6
Q	(Czech Republic) H Šromová	1	2
(United States) V King	7^{7}	6
WC	(United States) A Muhammed	6^{2}	0

Second round
5	(France) M Bartoli	7^{7}	6
Q	(Japan) A Nakamura	6^{4}	1
Q	(Germany) A Kerber	1	2
9	(Russia) E Dementieva	6	6
16	(Czech Republic) L Šafářová	4	6^{3}
(Russia) M Kirilenko	6	7^{7}
(United States) V King	3	0
2	(Serbia) J Janković	6	6

Third round
5	(France) M Bartoli	4	5
9	(Russia) E Dementieva	6	7
(Russia) M Kirilenko	6	3	7
2	(Serbia) J Janković	2	6	5

Quarterfinals
9	(Russia) E Dementieva	6	6
(Russia) M Kirilenko	2	4
