= 1998 WTA German Open – Doubles =

Doubles
- 1998 WTA German Open

Final
- Champions: (United States) Lindsay Davenport (Belarus) Natasha Zvereva
- Runners-up: (France) Alexandra Fusai (France) Nathalie Tauziat
- Score: 6–3, 6–0

Details
- Draw: 28
- Seeds: 8

Events
| Singles | Doubles |
| ← 1997 · | WTA German Open | · 1999 → |

Lindsay Davenport and Jana Novotná were the defending champions but they competed with different partners that year, Davenport with Natasha Zvereva and Novotná with Chanda Rubin.

Novotná and Rubin lost in the quarterfinals to Lisa Raymond and Rennae Stubbs.

Davenport and Zvereva won in the final 6–3, 6–0 against Alexandra Fusai and Nathalie Tauziat.

== Seeds ==
Champion seeds are indicated in bold text while text in italics indicates the round in which those seeds were eliminated. The top four seeded teams received byes into the second round.

1. (United States) **Lindsay Davenport** / (Belarus) **Natasha Zvereva (champions)**
2. (France) Alexandra Fusai / (France) Nathalie Tauziat (final)
3. (Indonesia) Yayuk Basuki / (Netherlands) Caroline Vis (quarterfinals)
4. n/a
5. (Russia) Anna Kournikova / (Latvia) Larisa Neiland (semifinals)
6. (United States) Lisa Raymond / (Australia) Rennae Stubbs (semifinals)
7. (Spain) Conchita Martínez / (Argentina) Patricia Tarabini (quarterfinals)
8. (Russia) Elena Likhovtseva / (Japan) Ai Sugiyama (quarterfinals)

== Draw ==
=== Key ===
- Q = Qualifier
- WC = Wild card
- LL = Lucky loser
- Alt = Alternate
- SE = Special exempt
- PR = Protected ranking
- ITF = ITF entry
- JE = Junior exempt
- w/o = Walkover
- r = Retired
- d = Defaulted
- SR = Special ranking

=== Final ===
Final

1
- (United States) **Lindsay Davenport**
- (Belarus) **Natasha Zvereva**
**6**
**6**

2
- (France) Alexandra Fusai
- (France) Nathalie Tauziat
3
0

=== Top half ===
First round

Second round

Quarterfinals

Semifinals

1
- (United States) **L Davenport**
- (Belarus) **N Zvereva**
**6**
**6**

- (Slovakia) **K Habšudová**
- (Ukraine) **O Lugina**
**7**
**7**

- (Slovakia) K Habšudová
- (Ukraine) O Lugina
1
3

- (Chinese Taipei) J Lee
- (Argentina) M Paz
6
5

1
- (United States) **L Davenport**
- (Belarus) **N Zvereva**
**6**
**6**

- (Romania) C Cristea
- (Australia) L Pleming
3
2

8
- (Russia) E Likhovtseva
- (Japan) A Sugiyama
4
3

- (Australia) **C Barclay**
- (Australia) **K-A Guse**
**6**
**6**

- (Australia) C Barclay
- (Australia) K-A Guse
1
2

- (Argentina) F Labat
- (Belgium) D Van Roost
**6**
5
3

8
- (Russia) **E Likhovtseva**
- (Japan) **A Sugiyama**
**6**
**6**

8
- (Russia) **E Likhovtseva**
- (Japan) **A Sugiyama**
3
**7**
**6**

1
- (United States) **L Davenport**
- (Belarus) **N Zvereva**
**6**
6
**6**

6
- (United States) L Raymond
- (Australia) R Stubbs
3
**7**
4

LL
- (France) A-G Sidot
- (Thailand) T Tanasugarn
4
3

- (Czech Republic) **J Novotná**
- (United States) **C Rubin**
3
**7**
**6**

- (Czech Republic) **J Novotná**
- (United States) **C Rubin**
**6**
**6**

- (Austria) B Schett
- (Switzerland) P Schnyder
**6**
5
4

- (Czech Republic) J Novotná
- (United States) C Rubin

WC
- (Germany) **S Schmidle**
- (Germany) **M Weingärtner**
**6**
6
**6**

6
- (United States) **L Raymond**
- (Australia) **R Stubbs**
**w/o**

- (Bulgaria) S Krivencheva
- (Japan) Y Yoshida
4
**7**
4

WC
- (Germany) S Schmidle
- (Germany) M Weingärtner
1
4

WC
- (Germany) A Glass
- (Germany) J Wöhr
1
0

6
- (United States) **L Raymond**
- (Australia) **R Stubbs**
**6**
**6**

6
- (United States) **L Raymond**
- (Australia) **R Stubbs**
**6**
**6**

=== Bottom half ===
First round

Second round

Quarterfinals

Semifinals

5
- (Russia) **A Kournikova**
- (Latvia) **L Neiland**
4
**6**
**6**

- (Italy) S Farina
- (Argentina) L Montalvo
**6**
2
1

5
- (Russia) **A Kournikova**
- (Latvia) **L Neiland**
4
**7**
**7**

- (United States) D Graham
- (United States) K Po
1
1

- (South Africa) A Coetzer
- (Spain) A Sánchez-Vicario
**6**
6
6

- (South Africa) **A Coetzer**
- (Spain) **A Sánchez-Vicario**
**6**
**6**

5
- (Russia) **A Kournikova**
- (Latvia) **L Neiland**
**6**
6
**6**

- (Japan) **N Kijimuta**
- (Japan) **N Miyagi**
**6**
**6**

3
- (Indonesia) Y Basuki
- (Netherlands) C Vis
2
**7**
4

- (Romania) R Dragomir
- (Croatia) I Majoli
3
1

- (Japan) N Kijimuta
- (Japan) N Miyagi
**6**
3
4

3
- (Indonesia) **Y Basuki**
- (Netherlands) **C Vis**
2
**6**
**6**

5
- (Russia) A Kournikova
- (Latvia) L Neiland
1
4

7
- (Spain) **C Martínez**
- (Argentina) **P Tarabini**
**6**
**6**

2
- (France) **A Fusai**
- (France) **N Tauziat**
**6**
**6**

- (Belgium) S Appelmans
- (Netherlands) M Oremans
4
1

7
- (Spain) **C Martínez**
- (Argentina) **P Tarabini**
**6**
4
**6**

- (France) **J Halard-Decugis**
- (France) **S Testud**
**6**
**6**

- (France) J Halard-Decugis
- (France) S Testud
4
**6**
1

- (Italy) R Grande
- (Romania) I Spîrlea
4
1

7
- (Spain) C Martínez
- (Argentina) P Tarabini
**6**
4
5

Q
- (France) **A Mauresmo**
- (United States) **S Reeves**
5
**6**
**3**

2
- (France) **A Fusai**
- (France) **N Tauziat**
4
**6**
**7**

- (Australia) R McQuillan
- (United States) C Morariu
**7**
4
2/r

Q
- (France) A Mauresmo
- (United States) S Reeves
0
r

2
- (France) **A Fusai**
- (France) **N Tauziat**
**5**
