= 1998 WTA German Open – Singles =

Singles
- 1998 WTA German Open

Final
- Champion: (Spain) Conchita Martínez
- Runner-up: (France) Amélie Mauresmo
- Score: 6–4, 6–4

Details
- Draw: 56
- Seeds: 16

Events
Singles	Doubles
← 1997 ·	WTA German Open	· 1999 →

Conchita Martínez defeated Amélie Mauresmo in the final, 6–4, 6–4 to win the singles tennis title at the 1998 WTA German Open.

Mary Joe Fernández was the reigning champion, but did not compete that year.

== Seeds ==
The top eight seeds received a bye to the second round.

1. (Switzerland) Martina Hingis (quarterfinals)
2. (United States) Lindsay Davenport (third round)
3. (Czech Republic) Jana Novotná (semifinals)
4. (South Africa) Amanda Coetzer (third round)
5. (Spain) Arantxa Sánchez-Vicario (third round)
6. (France) Mary Pierce (second round)
7. (Spain) Conchita Martínez (champion)
8. (Romania) Irina Spîrlea (quarterfinals)
9. (Croatia) Iva Majoli (third round)
10. (France) Nathalie Tauziat (first round)
11. (France) Sandrine Testud (third round)
12. (Belgium) Dominique Van Roost (first round)
13. (Switzerland) Patty Schnyder (first round)
14. (Russia) Anna Kournikova (semifinals)
15. (United States) Lisa Raymond (second round)
16. (Japan) Ai Sugiyama (quarterfinals)

== Draw ==
=== Key ===
- Q = Qualifier
- WC = Wild card
- LL = Lucky loser
- Alt = Alternate
- SE = Special exempt
- PR = Protected ranking
- ITF = ITF entry
- JE = Junior exempt
- w/o = Walkover
- r = Retired
- d = Defaulted
- SR = Special ranking

=== Finals ===
Quarterfinals
1	(Switzerland) Martina Hingis	3	6
14	(Russia) Anna Kournikova	6	7
16	(Japan) Ai Sugiyama	3	3
7	(Spain) Conchita Martínez	6	6
8	(Romania) Irina Spîrlea	3	7	3
3	(Czech Republic) Jana Novotná	6	5	6
(Austria) Barbara Paulus	4	2
Q	(France) Amélie Mauresmo	6	6

Semifinals
14	(Russia) Anna Kournikova	0	1
7	(Spain) Conchita Martínez	6	6
3	(Czech Republic) Jana Novotná	5	7	4
Q	(France) Amélie Mauresmo	7	5	6

Final
7	(Spain) Conchita Martínez	6	6
Q	(France) Amélie Mauresmo	4	4

=== Top half ===
==== Section 1 ====
First round
(Japan) N Sawamatsu	3	2
(Italy) S Farina	6	6
(Poland) M Grzybowska	4	7	6
WC	(Germany) S Schmidle	6	5	1
(France) A-G Sidot	3	2
9	(Croatia) I Majoli	6	6
14	(Russia) A Kournikova	6	6
Q	(Czech Republic) R Bobková	2	1
Q	(Chinese Taipei) J Lee	5	4
(Russia) E Likhovtseva	7	6
(Venezuela) M Vento	6	6
(Indonesia) Y Basuki	4	3

Second round
1	(Switzerland) M Hingis	6	7
(Italy) S Farina	0	5
(Poland) M Grzybowska	4	0
9	(Croatia) I Majoli	6	6
14	(Russia) A Kournikova	6	6
(Russia) E Likhovtseva	2	1
(Venezuela) M Vento	5	4
5	(Spain) A Sánchez-Vicario	7	6

Third round
1	(Switzerland) M Hingis	6	6
9	(Croatia) I Majoli	1	2
14	(Russia) A Kournikova	6	6
5	(Spain) A Sánchez-Vicario	4	2

Quarterfinals
1	(Switzerland) M Hingis	3	6
14	(Russia) A Kournikova	6	7

==== Section 2 ====
First round
LL	(Australia) R McQuillan	1	6	6
WC	(Germany) A Glass	6	0	7
Q	(Italy) F Perfetti	5	5
Q	(France) A Fusai	7	7
(Slovakia) K Habšudová	0	2
16	(Japan) A Sugiyama	6	6
11	(France) S Testud	4	6	7
(Belarus) N Zvereva	6	4	5
(France) J Halard-Decugis	2	6	7
(Romania) R Dragomir	6	3	6
(Spain) M Serna	6	6
(Netherlands) B Schultz-McCarthy	3	2

Second round
4	(South Africa) A Coetzer	6	4	6
WC	(Germany) A Glass	0	6	1
Q	(France) A Fusai	4	3
16	(Japan) A Sugiyama	6	6
11	(France) S Testud	6	6
(France) J Halard-Decugis	4	0
(Spain) M Serna	2	2
7	(Spain) C Martínez	6	6

Third round
4	(South Africa) A Coetzer	6	2	3
16	(Japan) A Sugiyama	4	6	6
11	(France) S Testud	6	5	2
7	(Spain) C Martínez	4	7	6

Quarterfinals
16	(Japan) A Sugiyama	3	3
7	(Spain) C Martínez	6	6

=== Bottom half ===
==== Section 3 ====
First round
Q	(Germany) J Wöhr	3	4
Q	(United States) M Shaughnessy	6	6
(Italy) R Grande	4	2
(United States) C Morariu	6	6
WC	(Germany) J Kandarr	3	3
15	(United States) L Raymond	6	6
13	(Switzerland) P Schnyder	6	6	3
(Spain) M Sánchez Lorenzo	2	7	6
(Thailand) T Tanasugarn	6	6
Q	(United States) J Capriati	3	1
(United States) A Miller	2	2
(Austria) B Schett	6	6

Second round
8	(Romania) I Spîrlea	6	6
Q	(United States) M Shaughnessy	4	1
(United States) C Morariu	7	1	6
15	(United States) L Raymond	5	6	2
(Spain) M Sánchez Lorenzo	3	6	6
(Thailand) T Tanasugarn	6	1	3
(Austria) B Schett	6	6	6
3	(Czech Republic) J Novotná	1	7	7

Third round
8	(Romania) I Spîrlea	w/o
(United States) C Morariu
(Spain) M Sánchez Lorenzo	4	4
3	(Czech Republic) J Novotná	6	6

Quarterfinals
8	(Romania) I Spîrlea	3	7	3
3	(Czech Republic) J Novotná	6	5	6

==== Section 4 ====
First round
(Austria) B Paulus	6	6
WC	(United States) C Rubin	4	2
(China) F Li	6	6
(Netherlands) M Oremans	0	2
(United States) S Cacic	7	6
10	(France) N Tauziat	5	4
12	(Belgium) D Van Roost	6	4	5
Q	(France) A Mauresmo	3	6	7
(United States) K Po	4	2
(Argentina) F Labat	6	6
(Slovakia) H Nagyová	2	6	7
(Belgium) S Appelmans	6	3	5

Second round
6	(France) M Pierce	6	6	1^{r}
(Austria) B Paulus	4	7	3
(China) F Li	4	4
(United States) S Cacic	6	6
Q	(France) A Mauresmo	7	7
(Argentina) F Labat	5	5
(Slovakia) H Nagyová	3	6	1
2	(United States) L Davenport	6	4	6

Third round
(Austria) B Paulus	3	6	6
(United States) S Cacic	6	3	3
Q	(France) A Mauresmo	6	6
2	(United States) L Davenport	2	4

Quarterfinals
(Austria) B Paulus	4	2
Q	(France) A Mauresmo	6	6
