= 2000 WTA German Open – Singles =

Singles
- 2000 WTA German Open

Final
- Champion: (Spain) Conchita Martínez
- Runner-up: (South Africa) Amanda Coetzer
- Score: 6–1, 6–2

Details
- Draw: 56
- Seeds: 16

Events
Singles	Doubles
← 1999 ·	German Open	· 2001 →

Conchita Martínez defeated Amanda Coetzer in the final, 6–1, 6–2 to win the singles tennis title at the 2000 WTA German Open.

Martina Hingis was the defending champion, but lost in the semifinals to Martínez.

== Seeds ==
The first eight seeds received a bye into the second round.

1. (Switzerland) Martina Hingis (semifinals)
2. (France) Nathalie Tauziat (second round)
3. (Spain) Conchita Martínez (champion)
4. (France) Julie Halard-Decugis (third round)
5. (France) Sandrine Testud (quarterfinals)
6. (Spain) Arantxa Sánchez Vicario (second round)
7. (Russia) Anna Kournikova (second round)
8. (Germany) Anke Huber (quarterfinals)
9. (France) Amélie Mauresmo (second round)
10. (South Africa) Amanda Coetzer (final)
11. (Japan) Ai Sugiyama (first round)
12. (Croatia) Silvija Talaja (third round)
13. (Romania) Ruxandra Dragomir (second round)
14. (Belgium) Sabine Appelmans (second round)
15. (United States) Chanda Rubin (third round)
16. (Switzerland) Patty Schnyder (first round)

== Draw ==
=== Key ===
- Q = Qualifier
- WC = Wild card
- LL = Lucky loser
- Alt = Alternate
- SE = Special exempt
- PR = Protected ranking
- ITF = ITF entry
- JE = Junior exempt
- w/o = Walkover
- r = Retired
- d = Defaulted
- SR = Special ranking

=== Finals ===
Quarterfinals
1	(Switzerland) Martina Hingis	7	5	6
5	(France) Sandrine Testud	5	7	2
3	(Spain) Conchita Martínez	6	6
(Spain) Gala León García	4	2
8	(Germany) Anke Huber	4	4
10	(South Africa) Amanda Coetzer	6	6
(Russia) Elena Dementieva	6	3	6^{5}
(South Africa) Joannette Kruger	2	6	7^{7}

Semifinals
1	(Switzerland) Martina Hingis	5	4
3	(Spain) Conchita Martínez	7	6
10	(South Africa) Amanda Coetzer	6	6
(South Africa) Joannette Kruger	2	4

Final
3	(Spain) Conchita Martínez	6	6
10	(South Africa) Amanda Coetzer	1	2

=== Top half ===
==== Section 1 ====
First round
(Switzerland) E Gagliardi	7^{7}	6
(Israel) A Smashnova	6^{4}	4
(United States) A Stevenson	6	7^{7}
(Russia) T Panova	2	6^{2}
(France) A-G Sidot	1	2
12	(Croatia) S Talaja	6	6
13	(Romania) R Dragomir	7	7
(France) S Pitkowski	5	5
Q	(Czech Republic) S Kleinová	2	1
(Czech Republic) D Chládková	6	6
(United States) C Morariu	6	6
WC	(Germany) A Glass	1	0

Second round
1	(Switzerland) M Hingis	6	6
(Switzerland) E Gagliardi	2	2
(United States) A Stevenson	1	3
12	(Croatia) S Talaja	6	6
13	(Romania) R Dragomir	7^{7}	3	4
(Czech Republic) D Chládková	6^{3}	6	6
(United States) C Morariu	1	6^{2}
5	(France) S Testud	6	7^{7}

Third round
1	(Switzerland) M Hingis	7^{7}	6
12	(Croatia) S Talaja	6^{3}	3
(Czech Republic) D Chládková	6^{0}	2
5	(France) S Testud	7^{7}	6

Quarterfinals
1	(Switzerland) M Hingis	7	5	6
5	(France) S Testud	5	7	2

==== Section 2 ====
First round
(Austria) S Plischke	6	4	6
WC	(Germany) M Müller	3	6	3
Q	(Spain) N Llagostera Vives	2	0
(Argentina) P Suárez	6	6
Q	(Bulgaria) P Nola	3	1
9	(France) A Mauresmo	6	6
15	(United States) C Rubin	6	6
WC	(Germany) B Rittner	1	4
(Slovakia) K Habšudová	2	0
Q	(United States) M Tu	6	6
(Colombia) F Zuluaga	5	0
(Spain) G León García	7	6

Second round
3	(Spain) C Martínez	6
(Austria) S Plischke	0	r
(Argentina) P Suárez	4	6	6
9	(France) A Mauresmo	6	3	4
15	(United States) C Rubin	6	6
Q	(United States) M Tu	3	1
(Spain) G León García	6	4	6
7	(Russia) A Kournikova	4	6	4

Third round
3	(Spain) C Martínez	6	6
(Argentina) P Suárez	4	3
15	(United States) C Rubin	1	7^{7}	3
(Spain) G León García	6	6^{5}	6

Quarterfinals
3	(Spain) C Martínez	6	6
(Spain) G León García	4	2

=== Bottom half ===
==== Section 3 ====
First round
(Spain) Á Montolio	6	6
Q	(Belarus) N Ostrovskaya	3	3
(Spain) M Serna	7	7^{7}
(Slovenia) K Srebotnik	5	6^{4}
LL	(Romania) C Cristea	7	3	6
11	(Japan) A Sugiyama	5	6	1
10	(South Africa) A Coetzer	6	6
Q	(Belarus) T Poutchek	1	0
(Luxembourg) A Kremer	7^{7}	6
(Croatia) M Lučić	6^{1}	3
(France) A Cocheteux	1	1
Q	(Slovakia) Ľ Cervanová	6	6

Second round
8	(Germany) A Huber	7^{7}	6
(Spain) Á Montolio	6^{5}	1
(Spain) M Serna	6	6
LL	(Romania) C Cristea	2	1
10	(South Africa) A Coetzer	6	7^{7}
(Luxembourg) A Kremer	3	6^{3}
Q	(Slovakia) Ľ Cervanová	1	1
4	(France) J Halard-Decugis	6	6

Third round
8	(Germany) A Huber	6	6^{6}	6
(Spain) M Serna	2	7^{8}	4
10	(South Africa) A Coetzer	6	6
4	(France) J Halard-Decugis	2	2

Quarterfinals
8	(Germany) A Huber	4	4
10	(South Africa) A Coetzer	6	6

==== Section 4 ====
First round
(Russia) E Dementieva	2	7^{7}	6
(Zimbabwe) C Black	6	6^{0}	2
(Bulgaria) M Maleeva	6	4	4
(Czech Republic) K Hrdličková	4	6	6
(Hungary) R Kuti-Kis	6	6
16	(Switzerland) P Schnyder	3	4
14	(Belgium) S Appelmans	6	6
LL	(Italy) G Casoni	2	4
Q	(Germany) B Lamade	6	6
(Romania) I Spîrlea	1	3
(South Africa) J Kruger	6	6
(Belarus) N Zvereva	1	1

Second round
6	(Spain) A Sánchez Vicario	4	7	2
(Russia) E Dementieva	6	5	6
(Czech Republic) K Hrdličková	7^{7}	6
(Hungary) R Kuti-Kis	6^{3}	2
14	(Belgium) S Appelmans	3	4
Q	(Germany) B Lamade	6	6
(South Africa) J Kruger	6	6
2	(France) N Tauziat	2	0

Third round
(Russia) E Dementieva	6	6
(Czech Republic) K Hrdličková	2	1
Q	(Germany) B Lamade	0	3
(South Africa) J Kruger	6	6

Quarterfinals
(Russia) E Dementieva	6	3	6^{5}
(South Africa) J Kruger	2	6	7^{7}
