= 2007 Acura Classic – Doubles =

Doubles
- 2007 Acura Classic

Final
- Champions: (Zimbabwe) Cara Black (United States) Liezel Huber
- Runners-up: (Belarus) Victoria Azarenka (Russia) Anna Chakvetadze
- Score: 7–5, 6–4

Details
- Draw: 28
- Seeds: 8

Events
Singles	Doubles
- Acura Classic

Cara Black and Rennae Stubbs were the defending champions but chose to participate with different partners. Stubbs teamed up with Květa Peschke and was eliminated in the second round. Black paired up with Liezel Huber and together they won the title after defeating Victoria Azarenka and Anna Chakvetadze 7–5, 6–4 in the final.

== Seeds ==
The top four seeds received a bye into the second round.

1. (Zimbabwe) Cara Black / (United States) Liezel Huber (champions)
2. (Slovenia) Katarina Srebotnik / (Japan) Ai Sugiyama (semifinals)
3. (Chinese Taipei) Chan Yung-jan / (Chinese Taipei) Chuang Chia-jung (semifinals)
4. (Czech Republic) Květa Peschke / (Australia) Rennae Stubbs (second round)
5. (Slovakia) Janette Husárová / (United States) Meghann Shaughnessy (first round)
6. (Argentina) Gisela Dulko / (Russia) Maria Kirilenko (second round)
7. (India) Sania Mirza / (Israel) Shahar Pe'er (second round)
8. (Serbia) Jelena Janković / (Russia) Nadia Petrova (second round)

== Draw ==
Key

- Q = Qualifier
- WC = Wild card
- LL = Lucky loser
- Alt = Alternate
- ITF = ITF entry
- PR = Protected ranking
- SR = Special ranking
- SE = Special exempt
- JE = Junior exempt
- JR = Junior Accelerator Programme entrant
- CO = College Accelerator Programme entrant
- NG = Next Gen Accelerator Program entrant
- w/o = Walkover
- r = Retired
- d = Defaulted

=== Finals ===
Semifinals
1	(Zimbabwe) Cara Black (United States) Liezel Huber	4	6	[10]
3	(Chinese Taipei) Chan Yung-jan (Chinese Taipei) Chuang Chia-jung	6	4	[5]
(Belarus) Victoria Azarenka (Russia) Anna Chakvetadze	6	3	[10]
2	(Slovenia) Katarina Srebotnik (Japan) Ai Sugiyama	3	6	[6]

Final
1	(Zimbabwe) Cara Black (United States) Liezel Huber	7	6
(Belarus) Victoria Azarenka (Russia) Anna Chakvetadze	5	4

=== Top half ===
First round
(Ukraine) Y Fedak (Belarus) T Poutchek	3	3
(United States) C Morariu (Switzerland) P Schnyder	6	6
(Greece) E Daniilidou (Germany) J Wöhr	4	6	[7]
(Colombia) C Castaño (Thailand) T Tanasugarn	6	1	[10]
(Ukraine) A Bondarenko (Ukraine) K Bondarenko	4	6^{6}
6	(Argentina) G Dulko (Russia) M Kirilenko	6	7^{8}
(Japan) A Morigami (United States) M Tu	7	4	[6]
(United States) J Craybas (United States) L Granville	5	6	[10]
(Germany) V Henke (Russia) E Makarova	5	1
(United States) V King (China) S Peng	7	6

Second round
1	(Zimbabwe) C Black (United States) L Huber	3	6	[10]
(United States) C Morariu (Switzerland) P Schnyder	6	4	[6]
(Colombia) C Castaño (Thailand) T Tanasugarn	6	4	[11]
6	(Argentina) G Dulko (Russia) M Kirilenko	4	6	[9]
3	(Chinese Taipei) Y-j Chan (Chinese Taipei) C-j Chuang	4	6	[10]
(United States) J Craybas (United States) L Granville	6	3	[5]
(United States) V King (China) S Peng	4	7	[10]
8	(Serbia) J Janković (Russia) N Petrova	6	5	[7]

Quarterfinals
1	(Zimbabwe) C Black (United States) L Huber	6	6
(Colombia) C Castaño (Thailand) T Tanasugarn	3	3
3	(Chinese Taipei) Y-j Chan (Chinese Taipei) C-j Chuang	6	6
(United States) V King (China) S Peng	2	4

Semifinals
1	(Zimbabwe) C Black (United States) L Huber	4	6	[10]
3	(Chinese Taipei) Y-j Chan (Chinese Taipei) C-j Chuang	6	4	[5]

=== Bottom half ===
First round
5	(Slovakia) J Husárová (United States) M Shaughnessy	4	6^{2}
(Romania) A Ehritt-Vanc (Russia) A Rodionova	6	7^{7}
(Belarus) V Azarenka (Russia) A Chakvetadze	6	6
WC	(United States) B Augustine (United States) A Rolle	1	1
(France) T Golovin (Russia) D Safina	7	6
WC	(Germany) A Kerber (United States) L Osterloh	5	1
7	(India) S Mirza (Israel) S Pe'er	6	6
(Germany) A Bachmann (Czech Republic) H Šromová	4	0
(Chinese Taipei) S-w Hsieh (Russia) A Kudryavtseva	6	5	[12]
(Australia) N Pratt (Australia) B Stewart	3	7	[10]
(Latvia) L Dekmeijere (Turkey) İ Şenoğlu	4	6	[6]
(Netherlands) M Krajicek (United States) B Mattek	6	4	[10]

Second round
(Romania) A Ehritt-Vanc (Russia) A Rodionova	4	4
(Belarus) V Azarenka (Russia) A Chakvetadze	6	6
(France) T Golovin (Russia) D Safina	6	6
4	(Czech Republic) K Pesche (Australia) R Stubbs	4	3
7	(India) S Mirza (Israel) S Pe'er	6	3	[10]
(Chinese Taipei) S-w Hsieh (Russia) A Kudryavtseva	3	6	[12]
(Netherlands) M Krajicek (United States) B Mattek	1	1
2	(Slovenia) K Srebotnik (Japan) A Sugiyama	6	6

Quarterfinals
(Belarus) V Azarenka (Russia) A Chakvetadze	6	6
(France) T Golovin (Russia) D Safina	2	4
(Chinese Taipei) S-w Hsieh (Russia) A Kudryavtseva	3	4
2	(Slovenia) K Srebotnik (Japan) A Sugiyama	6	6

Semifinals
(Belarus) V Azarenka (Russia) A Chakvetadze	6	6
2	(Slovenia) K Srebotnik (Japan) A Sugiyama	3	4
