= 1999 WTA German Open – Doubles =

Doubles
- 1999 WTA German Open

Final
- Champion: (France) Alexandra Fusai (France) Nathalie Tauziat
- Runner-up: (Czech Republic) Jana Novotná (Argentina) Patricia Tarabini
- Score: 6–3, 7–5

Details
- Draw: 28
- Seeds: 8

Events
Singles	Doubles
← 1998 ·	WTA German Open	· 2000 →

The 1999 WTA German Open doubles was the doubles event of the fifty-fifth edition of the tennis tournament played at Berlin, Germany, the most prestigious tennis tournament in Germanic Europe. It was the sixth WTA Tier I tournament of the year, and part of the European claycourt season. Lindsay Davenport and Natasha Zvereva were the reigning champions, but only Zvereva entered the tournament with Mary Pierce. However, Pierce withdrew from the tournament.

The French team of Alexandra Fusai and Nathalie Tauziat won their first Tier I title as a team, defeating Jana Novotná and Patricia Tarabini in the final.

== Seeds ==
The top four seeds received a bye into the second round.

1. (Czech Republic) Jana Novotná / (Argentina) Patricia Tarabini (final)
2. (France) Alexandra Fusai / (France) Nathalie Tauziat (champions)
3. (Russia) Elena Likhovtseva / (Japan) Ai Sugiyama (second round)
4. (Latvia) Larisa Neiland / (Spain) Arantxa Sánchez Vicario (semifinals)
5. (South Africa) Mariaan de Swardt / (Ukraine) Elena Tatarkova (first round)
6. (United States) Mary Joe Fernandez / (United States) Lisa Raymond (first round)
7. (Romania) Irina Spîrlea / (Netherlands) Caroline Vis (quarterfinals)
8. (Austria) Barbara Schett / (Switzerland) Patty Schnyder (second round)

== Draw ==
=== Key ===
- Q = Qualifier
- WC = Wild card
- LL = Lucky loser
- Alt = Alternate
- SE = Special exempt
- PR = Protected ranking
- ITF = ITF entry
- JE = Junior exempt
- w/o = Walkover
- r = Retired
- d = Defaulted
- SR = Special ranking

=== Finals ===
Semifinals
1	(Czech Republic) Jana Novotná (Argentina) Patricia Tarabini	6	6
(Romania) Ruxandra Dragomir (Argentina) Florencia Labat	3	1
4	(Latvia) Larisa Neiland (Spain) Arantxa Sánchez Vicario	4	1
2	(France) Alexandra Fusai (France) Nathalie Tauziat	6	6

Final
1	(Czech Republic) Jana Novotná (Argentina) Patricia Tarabini	3	5
2	(France) Alexandra Fusai (France) Nathalie Tauziat	6	7

=== Top half ===
First round
WC	(Germany) A Barna (Germany) M Weingärtner	3	5
(Germany) S Graf (Argentina) I Gorrochategui	6	7
WC	(Germany) J Abe (Germany) J Kandarr	6	2	2
(South Africa) L Horn (Canada) S Jeyaseelan	3	6	6
(Zimbabwe) C Black (France) A-G Sidot	6	7
6	(United States) MJ Fernandez (United States) L Raymond	3	5
(Romania) R Dragomir (Argentina) F Labat	7^{7}	6^{4}	6
(Netherlands) A Hopmans (Spain) A Ortuño	6^{5}	7^{7}	2
(United States) K Adams (United States) C Rubin	2	1
Q	(Italy) G Di Natale (Italy) F Perfetti	6	6
(United States) S Cacic (Italy) S Farina	6^{3}	6^{3}
7	(Romania) I Spîrlea (Netherlands) C Vis	7^{7}	7^{7}

Second round
1	(Czech Republic) J Novotná (Argentina) P Tarabini	6^{5}	6
(Germany) S Graf (Argentina) I Gorrochategui	7^{7}	4	r
(South Africa) L Horn (Canada) S Jeyaseelan	7	6
(Zimbabwe) C Black (France) A-G Sidot	5	2
3	(Russia) E Likhovtseva (Japan) A Sugiyama	4	6	3
(Romania) R Dragomir (Argentina) F Labat	6	3	6
(United States) K Adams (United States) C Rubin	4	6	4
7	(Romania) I Spîrlea (Netherlands) C Vis	6	2	6

Quarterfinals
1	(Czech Republic) J Novotná (Argentina) P Tarabini	6^{3}	6	6
(South Africa) L Horn (Canada) S Jeyaseelan	7^{7}	1	3
(Romania) R Dragomir (Argentina) F Labat	7^{7}	6
7	(Romania) I Spîrlea (Netherlands) C Vis	6^{3}	4

Semifinals
1	(Czech Republic) J Novotná (Argentina) P Tarabini	6	6
(Romania) R Dragomir (Argentina) F Labat	3	1

=== Bottom half ===
First round
8	(Austria) B Schett (Switzerland) P Schnyder	6	6
(Australia) C Barclay (Australia) K-A Guse	4	1
(Czech Republic) K Hrdličková (Germany) B Rittner	6	6
(France) C Dhenin (Ukraine) O Lugina	1	1
(Poland) A Olsza (Bulgaria) P Stoyanova	6	2	2
(United States) D Graham (Argentina) L Montalvo	4	6	6
5	(South Africa) M de Swardt (Ukraine) E Tatarkova	5	6	2
(United States) N Arendt (Netherlands) M Bollegraf	7	3	6
(Germany) A Huber (United States) C Morariu	6^{3}	3
LL	(United States) B Rippner (United States) T Snyder	7^{7}	6
(Russia) E Kulikovskaya (Czech Republic) E Melicharová	w/o
(France) J Halard-Decugis (France) A Mauresmo

Second round
8	(Austria) B Schett (Switzerland) P Schnyder	6^{4}	6	6^{5}
(Czech Republic) K Hrdličková (Germany) B Rittner	7^{7}	4	7^{7}
(United States) D Graham (Argentina) L Montalvo	3	4
4	(Latvia) L Neiland (Spain) A Sánchez Vicario	6	6
(United States) N Arendt (Netherlands) M Bollegraf	6	6
LL	(United States) B Rippner (United States) T Snyder	1	1
(Russia) E Kulikovskaya (Czech Republic) E Melicharová	0	2
2	(France) A Fusai (France) N Tauziat	6	6

Quarterfinals
(Czech Republic) K Hrdličková (Germany) B Rittner	6^{9}	1
4	(Latvia) L Neiland (Spain) A Sánchez Vicario	7^{11}	6
(United States) N Arendt (Netherlands) M Bollegraf	1	6^{2}
2	(France) A Fusai (France) N Tauziat	6	7^{7}

Semifinals
4	(Latvia) L Neiland (Spain) A Sánchez Vicario	4	1
2	(France) A Fusai (France) N Tauziat	6	6

== Qualifying ==
=== Seeds ===
1. (Australia) Alicia Molik / (United States) Samantha Reeves (second round)
2. (Italy) Germana Di Natale / (Italy) Flora Perfetti (champions)

=== Qualifiers ===
1. (Italy) Germana Di Natale / (Italy) Flora Perfetti

=== Lucky losers ===
1. (United States) Brie Rippner / (United States) Tara Snyder

== Qualifying draw ==
=== Key ===
- Q = Qualifier
- WC = Wild card
- LL = Lucky loser
- Alt = Alternate
- SE = Special exempt
- PR = Protected ranking
- ITF = ITF entry
- JE = Junior exempt
- w/o = Walkover
- r = Retired
- d = Defaulted
- SR = Special ranking

First round
1	(Australia) Alicia Molik (United States) Samantha Reeves
Bye
(United States) Brie Rippner (United States) Tara Snyder
Bye
(Argentina) Mariana Díaz Oliva (Argentina) María José Gaidano	9
(Austria) Sylvia Plischke (Romania) Raluca Sandu	8
Bye
2	(Italy) Germana Di Natale (Italy) Flora Perfetti

Second round
1	(Australia) Alicia Molik (United States) Samantha Reeves	4
(United States) Brie Rippner (United States) Tara Snyder	8
(Argentina) Mariana Díaz Oliva (Argentina) María José Gaidano	5
2	(Italy) Germana Di Natale (Italy) Flora Perfetti	8

Qualifying competition
(United States) Brie Rippner (United States) Tara Snyder	8
2	(Italy) Germana Di Natale (Italy) Flora Perfetti	6
