= 2000 WTA German Open – Doubles =

Doubles
- 2000 WTA German Open

Final
- Champions: (Spain) Conchita Martínez (Spain) Arantxa Sánchez Vicario
- Runners-up: (South Africa) Amanda Coetzer (United States) Corina Morariu
- Score: 3–6, 6–2, 7–6^{(9–7)}

Details
- Draw: 28
- Seeds: 8

Events
Singles	Doubles
← 1999 ·	German Open	· 2001 →

Alexandra Fusai and Nathalie Tauziat were the defending champions, but lost in quarterfinals to Nicole Arendt and Manon Bollegraf.

Conchita Martínez and Arantxa Sánchez Vicario won the title by defeating Amanda Coetzer and Corina Morariu 3–6, 6–2, 7–6^{(9–7)} in the final.

== Seeds ==
The first four seeds received a bye into the second round.

1. (Russia) Anna Kournikova / (Belarus) Natasha Zvereva (second round)
2. (France) Alexandra Fusai / (France) Nathalie Tauziat (quarterfinals)
3. (France) Julie Halard-Decugis / (Japan) Ai Sugiyama (quarterfinals)
4. (South Africa) Amanda Coetzer / (United States) Corina Morariu (final)
5. (United States) Chanda Rubin / (France) Sandrine Testud (first round)
6. (Spain) Conchita Martínez / (Spain) Arantxa Sánchez Vicario (champions)
7. (Argentina) Patricia Tarabini / (Netherlands) Caroline Vis (semifinals)
8. (Argentina) Laura Montalvo / (Argentina) Paola Suárez (quarterfinals, withdrew)

== Draw ==
=== Key ===
- Q = Qualifier
- WC = Wild card
- LL = Lucky loser
- Alt = Alternate
- SE = Special exempt
- PR = Protected ranking
- ITF = ITF entry
- JE = Junior exempt
- w/o = Walkover
- r = Retired
- d = Defaulted
- SR = Special ranking

=== Finals ===
Semifinals
7	(Argentina) Patricia Tarabini (Netherlands) Caroline Vis	2	3
6	(Spain) Conchita Martínez (Spain) Arantxa Sánchez Vicario	6	6
4	(South Africa) Amanda Coetzer (United States) Corina Morariu	7	6
(United States) Nicole Arendt (Netherlands) Manon Bollegraf	5	1

Final
6	(Spain) Conchita Martínez (Spain) Arantxa Sánchez Vicario	3	6	7^{9}
4	(South Africa) Amanda Coetzer (United States) Corina Morariu	6	2	6^{7}

=== Top half ===
First round
(Spain) RM Andrés Rodríguez (Spain) C Martínez Granados	6^{5}	4
WC	(Germany) A Glass (Germany) E Wagner	7^{7}	6
(Belgium) S Appelmans (France) A-G Sidot	1	6	3
Q	(Germany) G Arn (Germany) B Lamade	6	3	6
(Luxembourg) A Kremer (United States) M Tu	6	2	1
7	(Argentina) P Tarabini (Netherlands) C Vis	2	6	6
(Slovakia) K Habšudová (Switzerland) P Schnyder	3	1
(Romania) C Cristea (Romania) R Dragomir	6	6
(Spain) E Bes (Spain) G Riera	7	6
(Czech Republic) S Kleinová (Croatia) S Talaja	5	2
(Czech Republic) K Hrdličková (Germany) B Rittner	6	3	1
6	(Spain) C Martínez (Spain) A Sánchez Vicario	4	6	6

Second round
1	(Russia) A Kournikova (Belarus) N Zvereva
WC	(Germany) A Glass (Germany) E Wagner	w/o
Q	(Germany) G Arn (Germany) B Lamade	4	4
7	(Argentina) P Tarabini (Netherlands) C Vis	6	6
3	(France) J Halard-Decugis (Japan) A Sugiyama	6	6
(Romania) C Cristea (Romania) R Dragomir	1	4
(Spain) E Bes (Spain) G Riera	6^{3}	1
6	(Spain) C Martínez (Spain) A Sánchez Vicario	7^{7}	6

Quarterfinals
WC	(Germany) A Glass (Germany) E Wagner	6	6^{6}	6^{6}
7	(Argentina) P Tarabini (Netherlands) C Vis	4	7^{8}	7^{8}
3	(France) J Halard-Decugis (Japan) A Sugiyama	3	3
6	(Spain) C Martínez (Spain) A Sánchez Vicario	6	6

Semifinals
7	(Argentina) P Tarabini (Netherlands) C Vis	2	3
6	(Spain) C Martínez (Spain) A Sánchez Vicario	6	6

=== Bottom half ===
First round
8	(Argentina) L Montalvo (Argentina) P Suárez	3	6	7
(Switzerland) E Gagliardi (South Africa) J Kruger	6	4	5
(Czech Republic) R Bobková (Germany) C Schneider	1	1
(Zimbabwe) C Black (Kazakhstan) I Selyutina	6	6
WC	(Germany) A Roesch (Germany) M Weingärtner	6	3	5
(Austria) M Maruska (Belarus) N Ostrovskaya	3	6	7
5	(United States) C Rubin (France) S Testud	3	7	6^{2}
(United States) N Arendt (Netherlands) M Bollegraf	6	5	7^{7}
(Denmark) E Dyrberg (Austria) K Kschwendt	2	4
(Slovenia) T Križan (Slovenia) K Srebotnik	6	6
(Italy) G Casoni (Belarus) T Poutchek	4	7	6
(Spain) M Serna (United States) A Stevenson	6	5	2

Second round
8	(Argentina) L Montalvo (Argentina) P Suárez	3	6	6
(Zimbabwe) C Black (Kazakhstan) I Selyutina	6	3	0
(Austria) M Maruska (Belarus) N Ostrovskaya	0	1
4	(South Africa) A Coetzer (United States) C Morariu	6	6
(United States) N Arendt (Netherlands) M Bollegraf	6	6
(Slovenia) T Križan (Slovenia) K Srebotnik	1	2
(Italy) G Casoni (Belarus) T Poutchek	5	6	5
2	(France) A Fusai (France) N Tauziat	7	4	7

Quarterfinals
8	(Argentina) L Montalvo (Argentina) P Suárez
4	(South Africa) A Coetzer (United States) C Morariu	w/o
(United States) N Arendt (Netherlands) M Bollegraf	7^{8}	7^{7}
2	(France) A Fusai (France) N Tauziat	6^{6}	6^{4}

Semifinals
4	(South Africa) A Coetzer (United States) C Morariu	7	6
(United States) N Arendt (Netherlands) M Bollegraf	5	1
