= 2001 Toray Pan Pacific Open – Singles =

Singles
- 2001 Toray Pan Pacific Open

Final
- Champion: (United States) Lindsay Davenport
- Runner-up: (Switzerland) Martina Hingis
- Score: 6–7^{(4–7)}, 6–4, 6–2

Details
- Draw: 28 (4 Q / 2 WC )
- Seeds: 8

Events
Singles	Doubles
← 2000 ·	Pan Pacific Open	· 2002 →

Lindsay Davenport defeated the two-time defending champion Martina Hingis in the final, 6–7^{(4–7)}, 6–4, 6–2 to win the singles tennis title at the 2001 Pan Pacific Open.

== Seeds ==
A champion seed is indicated in bold text while text in italics indicates the round in which that seed was eliminated. The top four seeds received a bye to the second round.

1. (Switzerland) Martina Hingis (final)
2. (United States) **Lindsay Davenport (champion)**
3. (Russia) Anna Kournikova (semifinals)
4. (South Africa) Amanda Coetzer (second round)
5. (France) Sandrine Testud (second round)
6. (Russia) Elena Likhovtseva (second round)
7. (United States) Lisa Raymond (second round)
8. (Bulgaria) Magdalena Maleeva (semifinals)

== Draw ==
=== Key ===
- Q = Qualifier
- WC = Wild card
- LL = Lucky loser
- Alt = Alternate
- SE = Special exempt
- PR = Protected ranking
- ITF = ITF entry
- JE = Junior exempt
- w/o = Walkover
- r = Retired
- d = Defaulted
- SR = Special ranking

=== Final ===
Final
1	(Switzerland) Martina Hingis	**7^{7}**	4	2
2	(United States) **Lindsay Davenport**	6^{4}	**6**	**6**

=== Top half ===
First round
(Czech Republic) D Bedáňová	**7**	6^{5}	6^{3}
(Zimbabwe) **C Black**	5	**7^{7}**	**7^{7}**
Q	(Japan) H Inoue	4	2
(Japan) **A Sugiyama**	**6**	**6**
(United States) K Brandi	0	4
5	(France) **S Testud**	**6**	**6**
WC	(Japan) **S Asagoe**	**6**	**6**
(Canada) S Jeyaseelan	2	4
(Italy) T Garbin	3	1
(Russia) **T Panova**	**6**	**6**
Q	(Belgium) E Callens	3	4
8	(Bulgaria) **M Maleeva**	**6**	**6**

Second round
1	(Switzerland) **M Hingis**	**6**	**6**
(Zimbabwe) C Black	3	3
(Japan) **A Sugiyama**	**6**	**6**
5	(France) S Testud	4	4
4	(South Africa) A Coetzer	4	**7**	6^{5}
WC	(Japan) **S Asagoe**	**6**	5	**6^{7}**
(Russia) T Panova	6^{5}	2
8	(Bulgaria) **M Maleeva**	**7^{7}**	**6**

Quarterfinals
1	(Switzerland) **M Hingis**	**6**	5	**6**
(Japan) A Sugiyama	0	**7**	2
WC	(Japan) S Asagoe	1	6^{1}
8	(Bulgaria) **M Maleeva**	**6**	**7^{7}**

Semifinals
1	(Switzerland) **M Hingis**	**6**	1	**6**
8	(Bulgaria) M Maleeva	3	**6**	0

=== Bottom half ===
First round
6	(Russia) **E Likhovtseva**	**6**	**6**
(United States) C Morariu	3	2
(France) **A-G Sidot**	3	**6**	**6**
LL	(United States) J Hopkins	**6**	2	3
Q	(Japan) **S Obata**	**6**	**6**
Q	(Slovenia) K Srebotnik	3	3
7	(United States) **L Raymond**	**6**	**6**
(United States) L Osterloh	1	4
(Australia) N Pratt	4	0
WC	(Croatia) **I Majoli**	**6**	**6**
(Israel) A Smashnova	2	1
(United States) **M Shaughnessy**	**6**	**6**

Second round
6	(Russia) E Likhovtseva	2	**6**	6^{2}
(France) **A-G Sidot**	**6**	4	**7^{7}**
Q	(Japan) S Obata	6^{8}	**6**	4
3	(Russia) **A Kournikova**	**7^{10}**	1	**6**
7	(United States) L Raymond	**7^{7}**	2	6^{1}
WC	(Croatia) **I Majoli**	6^{3}	**6**	**7^{7}**
(United States) M Shaughnessy	3	2
2	(United States) **L Davenport**	**6**	**6**

Quarterfinals
(France) A-G Sidot	6^{4}	2
3	(Russia) **A Kournikova**	**7^{7}**	**6**
WC	(Croatia) I Majoli	2	0
2	(United States) **L Davenport**	**6**	**6**

Semifinals
3	(Russia) A Kournikova	1	**7^{7}**	0
2	(United States) **L Davenport**	**6**	6^{5}	**6**
