= 2000 Toray Pan Pacific Open – Singles =

Singles
- 2000 Toray Pan Pacific Open

Final
- Champion: (Switzerland) Martina Hingis
- Runner-up: (France) Sandrine Testud
- Score: 6–3, 7–5

Details
- Draw: 28 (4 Q / 1 WC )
- Seeds: 8

Events
Singles	Doubles
← 1999 ·	Pan Pacific Open	· 2001 →

Defending champion Martina Hingis defeated Sandrine Testud in the final, 6–3, 7–5 to win the singles tennis title at the 2000 Pan Pacific Open.

== Seeds ==
The top four seeds received a bye into the second round.

1. (Switzerland) Martina Hingis (champion)
2. (France) Mary Pierce (second round)
3. (France) Nathalie Tauziat (quarterfinals)
4. (South Africa) Amanda Coetzer (quarterfinals)
5. (Russia) Anna Kournikova (quarterfinals)
6. (France) Sandrine Testud (final)
7. (United States) Chanda Rubin (semifinals)
8. (Japan) Ai Sugiyama (first round)

== Draws ==
=== Key ===
- Q = Qualifier
- WC = Wild card
- LL = Lucky loser
- Alt = Alternate
- SE = Special exempt
- PR = Protected ranking
- ITF = ITF entry
- JE = Junior exempt
- w/o = Walkover
- r = Retired
- d = Defaulted
- SR = Special ranking

=== Finals ===
Semifinals
1	(Switzerland) Martina Hingis	7^{7}	6
7	(United States) Chanda Rubin	6^{2}	4
6	(France) Sandrine Testud	3	7	6
(Slovenia) Katarina Srebotnik	6	5	1

Final
1	(Switzerland) Martina Hingis	6	7
6	(France) Sandrine Testud	3	5

=== Top half ===
First round
(Thailand) T Tanasugarn	1	4
(United States) L Raymond	6	6
(Australia) N Pratt	6	6
(Israel) A Smashnova	0	1
(France) A-G Sidot	3	2
5	(Russia) A Kournikova	6	6
(Spain) C Torrens Valero	4	4
(Belarus) N Zvereva	6	6
(United States) A Stevenson	4
(Spain) M Sánchez Lorenzo	1^{r}
(Russia) T Panova	0^{r}
7	(United States) C Rubin	6

Second round
1	(Switzerland) M Hingis	6	7
(United States) L Raymond	3	5
(Australia) N Pratt	2	6	1
5	(Russia) A Kournikova	6	1	6
4	(South Africa) A Coetzer	7^{7}	6
(Belarus) N Zvereva	6^{2}	1
(United States) A Stevenson	4	1
7	(United States) C Rubin	6	6

Quarterfinals
1	(Switzerland) M Hingis	6	6
5	(Russia) A Kournikova	0	2
4	(South Africa) A Coetzer	4	4
7	(United States) C Rubin	6	6

Semifinals
1	(Switzerland) M Hingis	7^{7}	6
7	(United States) C Rubin	6^{2}	4

=== Bottom half ===
First round
6	(France) S Testud	6	6
(Slovakia) K Habšudová	1	2
Q	(Italy) T Garbin	3	3
(United States) C Morariu	6	6
(Zimbabwe) C Black	7	2	6
Q	(Bulgaria) M Maleeva	5	6	2
8	(Japan) A Sugiyama	3	3
(Slovenia) K Srebotnik	6	6
Q	(Kazakhstan) I Selyutina	6	6
Q	(Russia) N Petrova	2	4
WC	(Japan) S Asagoe	2	6	2
LL	(United States) L Osterloh	6	4	6

Second round
6	(France) S Testud	6	4	6
(United States) C Morariu	1	6	1
(Zimbabwe) C Black	3	3
3	(France) N Tauziat	6	6
(Slovenia) K Srebotnik	7	2	6
Q	(Kazakhstan) I Selyutina	5	6	3
LL	(United States) L Osterloh	6^{3}	6	6
2	(France) M Pierce	7^{7}	4	4

Quarterfinals
6	(France) S Testud	7^{7}	6
3	(France) N Tauziat	6^{4}	0
(Slovenia) K Srebotnik	7^{8}	6
LL	(United States) L Osterloh	6^{6}	1

Semifinals
6	(France) S Testud	3	7	6
(Slovenia) K Srebotnik	6	5	1
