= 2001 Toray Pan Pacific Open =

- Date: January 30 – February 4
- Edition: 29th
- Category: Tier I
- Draw: 32S / 16D
- Prize money: $1,188,000
- Surface: Carpet / indoor
- Location: Tokyo, Japan
- Venue: Tokyo Metropolitan Gymnasium

Champions

Singles
- (United States) Lindsay Davenport

Doubles
- (United States) Lisa Raymond / (Australia) Rennae Stubbs
← 2000 ·	Pan Pacific Open	· 2002 →

The 2001 Toray Pan Pacific Open was a women's tennis tournament played on indoor carpet courts at the Tokyo Metropolitan Gymnasium in Tokyo in Japan and was part of Tier I of the 2001 WTA Tour. The tournament ran from January 30 through February 4, 2001. Second-seeded Lindsay Davenport won the singles title.

== Finals ==
=== Singles ===
(United States) Lindsay Davenport defeated (Switzerland) Martina Hingis 6–7^{(4–7)}, 6–4, 6–2

- It was Davenport's 1st singles title of the year and the 31st of her career.

=== Doubles ===
(United States) Lisa Raymond / (Australia) Rennae Stubbs defeated (Russia) Anna Kournikova / (Uzbekistan) Iroda Tulyaganova 7–6^{(7–5)}, 2–6, 7–6^{(8–6)}

- It was Raymond's 1st title of the year and the 21st of her career. It was Stubbs' 1st title of the year and the 25th of her career.
