= 2002 Toray Pan Pacific Open – Singles =

Singles
- 2002 Toray Pan Pacific Open

Final
- Champion: (Switzerland) Martina Hingis
- Runner-up: (United States) Monica Seles
- Score: 7–6^{(8–6)}, 4–6, 6–3

Details
- Draw: 28 (4 Q / 3 WC )
- Seeds: 8

Events
Singles	Doubles
- Pan Pacific Open

Martina Hingis defeated Monica Seles in the final, 7–6^{(8–6)}, 4–6, 6–3 to win the singles tennis title at the 2002 Pan Pacific Open.

Lindsay Davenport was the reigning champion, but did not compete this year.

== Seeds ==
The first four seeds received a bye into the second round.

1. (Switzerland) Martina Hingis (champion)
2. (Federal Republic of Yugoslavia) Jelena Dokic (second round)
3. (United States) Monica Seles (final)
4. (France) Sandrine Testud (quarterfinals)
5. (Italy) Silvia Farina Elia (semifinals)
6. (Bulgaria) Magdalena Maleeva (second round)
7. (Russia) Elena Dementieva (second round)
8. (South Africa) Amanda Coetzer (second round)

== Draw ==
Key

- Q = Qualifier
- WC = Wild card
- LL = Lucky loser
- Alt = Alternate
- ITF = ITF entry
- PR = Protected ranking
- SR = Special ranking
- SE = Special exempt
- JE = Junior exempt
- JR = Junior Accelerator Programme entrant
- CO = College Accelerator Programme entrant
- NG = Next Gen Accelerator Program entrant
- w/o = Walkover
- r = Retired
- d = Defaulted

=== Finals ===
Semifinals
1	(Switzerland) Martina Hingis	6	6
5	(Italy) Silvia Farina Elia	0	4
3	(United States) Monica Seles	6	3	6
WC	(Russia) Anna Kournikova	3	6	3

Final
1	(Switzerland) Martina Hingis	7^{8}	4	6
3	(United States) Monica Seles	6^{6}	6	3

=== Top half ===
First round
WC	(Japan) R Fujiwara	1	6^{5}
(Germany) M Weingärtner	6	7^{7}
WC	(Argentina) ME Salerni	3	6	2
(Thailand) T Tanasugarn	6	3	6
(Czech Republic) D Bedáňová	4	4
6	(Bulgaria) M Maleeva	6	6
(Spain) M Serna	1	3
(Austria) B Schett	6	6
(Uzbekistan) I Tulyaganova	6^{7}	3
(Italy) R Grande	7^{9}	6
(Russia) T Panova	4	5
5	(Italy) S Farina Elia	6	7

Second round
1	(Switzerland) M Hingis	6	6
(Germany) M Weingärtner	1	2
(Thailand) T Tanasugarn	6	2	6
6	(Bulgaria) M Maleeva	3	6	2
4	(France) S Testud	4	7	7
(Austria) B Schett	6	5	5
(Italy) R Grande	5	4
5	(Italy) S Farina Elia	7	6

Quarterfinals
1	(Switzerland) M Hingis	6	6
(Thailand) T Tanasugarn	3	2
4	(France) S Testud	4	3
5	(Italy) S Farina Elia	6	6

Semifinals
1	(Switzerland) M Hingis	6	6
5	(Italy) S Farina Elia	0	4

=== Bottom half ===
First round
8	(South Africa) A Coetzer	7	6
(United States) L Raymond	5	4
Q	(United States) A Stevenson	6	6
Q	(Slovenia) K Srebotnik	1	4
Q	(Belgium) E Callens	1	6	6
(Japan) A Sugiyama	6	2	4
7	(Russia) E Dementieva	6	6
Q	(Japan) S Obata	3	3
(Spain) C Torrens Valero	3	0
WC	(Russia) A Kournikova	6	6
(Luxembourg) A Kremer	4	6	6
(Russia) E Likhovtseva	6	1	3

Second round
8	(South Africa) A Coetzer	6	0	6^{3}
Q	(United States) A Stevenson	4	6	7^{7}
Q	(Belgium) E Callens	2	3
3	(United States) M Seles	6	6
7	(Russia) E Dementieva	6^{4}	6^{5}
WC	(Russia) A Kournikova	7^{7}	7^{7}
(Luxembourg) A Kremer	7	6
2	(Federal Republic of Yugoslavia) J Dokic	5	2

Quarterfinals
Q	(United States) A Stevenson	6^{9}	6^{9}
3	(United States) M Seles	7^{11}	7^{11}
WC	(Russia) A Kournikova	6	6
(Luxembourg) A Kremer	4	2

Semifinals
3	(United States) M Seles	6	3	6
WC	(Russia) A Kournikova	3	6	3

== Qualifying ==
=== Qualifying seeds ===
1. (United States) Alexandra Stevenson (qualified)
2. (Australia) Nicole Pratt (second round)
3. (Russia) Anastasia Myskina (first round)
4. (Australia) Alicia Molik (qualifying competition)
5. (United States) Jennifer Hopkins (second round)
6. (Zimbabwe) Cara Black (second round)
7. (Kazakhstan) Irina Selyutina (qualifying competition)
8. (Italy) Tathiana Garbin (second round)

=== Qualifiers ===
1. (United States) Alexandra Stevenson
2. (Slovenia) Katarina Srebotnik
3. (Belgium) Els Callens
4. (Japan) Saori Obata

=== Qualifying draw ===
==== First qualifier ====
First round
1	(United States) Alexandra Stevenson	6	5	6
(South Africa) Liezel Huber	3	7	2
(Sweden) Åsa Svensson	6^{4}	0
(United States) Abigail Spears	7^{7}	6
(Indonesia) Wynne Prakusya	6	7
(Japan) Miho Saeki	4	5
(Japan) Shiho Hisamatsu	2	4
6	(Zimbabwe) Cara Black	6	6

Second round
1	(United States) Alexandra Stevenson	6	6
(United States) Abigail Spears	2	4
(Indonesia) Wynne Prakusya	6	7
6	(Zimbabwe) Cara Black	3	5

Qualifying competition
1	(United States) Alexandra Stevenson	7^{7}	6
(Indonesia) Wynne Prakusya	6^{5}	4

==== Second qualifier ====
First round
2	(Australia) Nicole Pratt	6	6
(Italy) Roberta Vinci	4	1
(Slovenia) Katarina Srebotnik	6	6
(South Korea) Kim Eun-ha	3	3
WC	(Japan) Chisayo Ito	6	6
WC	(Japan) Remi Tezuka	3	1
(Japan) Yuka Yoshida	2	0
7	(Kazakhstan) Irina Selyutina	6	6

Second round
2	(Australia) Nicole Pratt	4	3
(Slovenia) Katarina Srebotnik	6	6
WC	(Japan) Chisayo Ito	6	2	1
7	(Kazakhstan) Irina Selyutina	3	6	6

Qualifying competition
(Slovenia) Katarina Srebotnik	4	6	6
7	(Kazakhstan) Irina Selyutina	6	4	4

==== Third qualifier ====
First round
3	(Russia) Anastasia Myskina	4	6	6^{5}
(Belgium) Els Callens	6	1	7^{7}
(South Korea) Jeon Mi-ra	3	3
(South Korea) Cho Yoon-jeong	6	6
WC	(Japan) Rika Hiraki	1	2
(Japan) Akiko Morigami	6	6
WC	(Japan) Satomi Kinjo	4	2
8	(Italy) Tathiana Garbin	6	6

Second round
(Belgium) Els Callens	6	6
(South Korea) Cho Yoon-jeong	3	2
(Japan) Akiko Morigami	6	6
8	(Italy) Tathiana Garbin	3	1

Qualifying competition
(Belgium) Els Callens	7	6
(Japan) Akiko Morigami	5	1

==== Fourth qualifier ====
First round
4	(Australia) Alicia Molik	6	6
(Chinese Taipei) Janet Lee	4	4
(Japan) Shinobu Asagoe	6	1	6
(Japan) Haruka Inoue	1	6	2
(United States) Jill Craybas	6	3	1
(Japan) Saori Obata	3	6	6
(United States) Jane Chi	6^{10}	6	0
5	(United States) Jennifer Hopkins	7^{12}	1	6

Second round
4	(Australia) Alicia Molik	6	7^{7}
(Japan) Shinobu Asagoe	3	6^{3}
(Japan) Saori Obata	6	7^{7}
5	(United States) Jennifer Hopkins	1	6^{3}

Qualifying competition
4	(Australia) Alicia Molik	2	2
(Japan) Saori Obata	6	6
