= 1998 Makarska International Championships =

- Date: 13–19 April
- Edition: Only
- Category: Tier IV
- Prize money: $107,500
- Surface: Clay / outdoor
- Location: Makarska, Croatia

Champions

Singles
- (Czech Republic) Květa Hrdličková

Doubles
- (Slovenia) Tina Križan / (Slovenia) Katarina Srebotnik
Makarska International Championships	· 2022 →

The 1998 Makarska International Championships was a women's tennis tournament played on outdoor clay courts in Makarska in Croatia that was part of Tier IV of the 1998 WTA Tour. It was the inaugural and only edition of the tournament and was held from 13 April through 19 April 1998. Unseeded Květa Hrdličková, who entered the main draw as a qualifier, won the singles title.

== Finals ==
=== Singles ===
(Czech Republic) Květa Hrdličková defeated (China) Fang Li 6–3, 6–1

- It was Hrdličková's 1st title of the year and the 1st of her career.

=== Doubles ===
(Slovenia) Tina Križan / (Slovenia) Katarina Srebotnik defeated (Austria) Karin Kschwendt / (Russia) Evgenia Kulikovskaya 7–6, 6–1

- It was Križan's only title of the year and the 2nd of her career. It was Srebotnik's only title of the year and the 1st of her career.
