= 2001 Toray Pan Pacific Open – Doubles =

Doubles
- 2001 Toray Pan Pacific Open

Final
- Champions: (United States) Lisa Raymond (Australia) Rennae Stubbs
- Runners-up: (Russia) Anna Kournikova (Uzbekistan) Iroda Tulyaganova
- Score: 7–6^{(7–5)}, 2–6, 7–6^{(8–6)}

Events
| Singles | Doubles |
| ← 2000 · | Toray Pan Pacific Open | · 2002 → |

Martina Hingis and Mary Pierce were the defending champions but did not compete that year.

Lisa Raymond and Rennae Stubbs won in the final 7–6^{(7–5)}, 2–6, 7–6^{(8–6)} against Anna Kournikova and Iroda Tulyaganova.

== Seeds ==
Champion seeds are indicated in bold text while text in italics indicates the round in which those seeds were eliminated.

1. (United States) **Lisa Raymond** / (Australia) **Rennae Stubbs (champions)**
2. (United States) Nicole Arendt / (Japan) Ai Sugiyama (semifinals)
3. (Zimbabwe) Cara Black / (Russia) Elena Likhovtseva (first round)
4. (Belgium) Els Callens / (France) Anne-Gaëlle Sidot (first round)

== Draw ==
=== Key ===
- Q = Qualifier
- WC = Wild card
- LL = Lucky loser
- Alt = Alternate
- SE = Special exempt
- PR = Protected ranking
- ITF = ITF entry
- JE = Junior exempt
- w/o = Walkover
- r = Retired
- d = Defaulted
- SR = Special ranking

First round
1 | (United States) **L Raymond** (Australia) **R Stubbs** | **6** | 6^{4} | **6**
(Slovenia) T Križan (Kazakhstan) I Selyutina | 4 | **7^{7}** | 3
(Slovenia) **K Srebotnik** (France) **S Testud** | **6** | 2 | **7^{7}**
(United States) L Davenport (United States) C Morariu | 2 | **6** | 6^{5}
4 | (Belgium) E Callens (France) A-G Sidot | 6^{6} | **6** | 4
(South Africa) **A Coetzer** (United States) **K Po** | **7^{8}** | 1 | **6**
Q | (Japan) **H Inoue** (Japan) **M Inoue** | **6** | 6^{3} | **7**
(Japan) R Hiraki (Netherlands) S Noorlander | 3 | **7^{7}** | 5
(Netherlands) K Boogert (Bulgaria) M Maleeva | 3 | 1
(Australia) **N Pratt** (United States) **M Shaughnessy** | **6** | **6**
(Russia) **A Kournikova** (Uzbekistan) **I Tulyaganova** | **7^{8}** | 2 | **6**
3 | (Zimbabwe) C Black (Russia) E Likhovtseva | 6^{6} | **6** | 3
(Italy) **T Garbin** (Slovakia) **J Husárová** | **6** | **7**
(South Africa) L Horn (Canada) S Jeyaseelan | 3 | 5
WC | (Japan) S Asagoe (Japan) Y Yoshida | 4 | 0
2 | (United States) **N Arendt** (Japan) **A Sugiyama** | **6** | **6**

Quarterfinals
1 | (United States) **L Raymond** (Australia) **R Stubbs** | **6** | **6**
(Slovenia) K Srebotnik (France) S Testud | 1 | 4
(South Africa) **A Coetzer** (United States) **K Po** | 1 | **6** | **6**
Q | (Japan) H Inoue (Japan) M Inoue | **6** | 3 | 2
(Australia) N Pratt (United States) M Shaughnessy | 4 | 1
(Russia) **A Kournikova** (Uzbekistan) **I Tulyaganova** | **6** | **6**
(Italy) T Garbin (Slovakia) J Husárová | 1 | 1
2 | (United States) **N Arendt** (Japan) **A Sugiyama** | **6** | **6**

Semifinals
1 | (United States) **L Raymond** (Australia) **R Stubbs** | **6** | **6**
(South Africa) A Coetzer (United States) K Po | 3 | 2
(Russia) **A Kournikova** (Uzbekistan) **I Tulyaganova** | 4 | **7^{7}** | **6**
2 | (United States) N Arendt (Japan) A Sugiyama | **6** | 6^{1} | 0

Final
1 | (United States) **Lisa Raymond** (Australia) **Rennae Stubbs** | **7^{7}** | 2 | **7^{8}**
(Russia) Anna Kournikova (Uzbekistan) Iroda Tulyaganova | 6^{5} | **6** | 6^{6}
