= 1998 Makarska International Championships – Doubles =

Doubles
- 1998 Makarska International Championships

Final
- Champions: (Slovenia) Tina Križan (Slovenia) Katarina Srebotnik
- Runners-up: (Austria) Karin Kschwendt (Russia) Evgenia Kulikovskaya
- Score: 7–6, 6–1

Details
- Draw: 16
- Seeds: 4

Events
Singles	Doubles
Makarska International Championships

Tina Križan and Katarina Srebotnik won in the final 7–6, 6–1 against Karin Kschwendt and Evgenia Kulikovskaya.

== Seeds ==
Champion seeds are indicated in bold text while text in italics indicates the round in which those seeds were eliminated.

1. (Netherlands) Kristie Boogert / (Croatia) Mirjana Lučić (quarterfinals)
2. (Czech Republic) Lenka Němečková / (Czech Republic) Helena Vildová (first round)
3. (Ukraine) Olga Lugina / (Germany) Elena Wagner (first round)
4. (Czech Republic) Radka Bobková / (Czech Republic) Eva Melicharová (quarterfinals)

== Draw ==
=== Key ===
- Q = Qualifier
- WC = Wild card
- LL = Lucky loser
- Alt = Alternate
- ITF = ITF entry
- PR = Protected ranking
- SR = Special ranking
- SE = Special exempt
- JE = Junior exempt
- JR = Junior Accelerator Programme entrant
- CO = College Accelerator Programme entrant
- NG = Next Gen Accelerator Program entrant
- w/o = Walkover
- r = Retired
- d = Defaulted

First round
1	(Netherlands) **K Boogert** (Croatia) **M Lučić**	**6**	**6**
(Zimbabwe) C Black (Kazakhstan) I Selyutina	3	2
Q	(Spain) **G León García** (Spain) **C Torrens Valero**	**6**	**6**
LL	(Croatia) K Pojatina (Croatia) I Višić	4	2
4	(Czech Republic) **R Bobková** (Czech Republic) **E Melicharová**	**7**	**6**
(Germany) C Schneider (Bulgaria) P Stoyanova	5	0
(Austria) **K Kschwendt** (Russia) **E Kulikovskaya**	**6**	**6**
Q	(France) A Cocheteux (France) N Dechy	4	2
(France) É Loit (Italy) F Perfetti	5	2
WC	(Czech Republic) **S Kleinová** (Croatia) **J Kostanić**	**7**	**6**
(Slovenia) **T Križan** (Slovenia) **K Srebotnik**	**6**	6	**7**
3	(Ukraine) O Lugina (Germany) E Wagner	3	**7**	6
(United States) R Jensen (India) N Vaidyanathan	3	2
(Argentina) **M-F Landa** (Germany) **M Weingärtner**	**6**	**6**
(Hungary) **V Csurgo** (Czech Republic) **P Langrová**	4	**7**	**7**
2	(Czech Republic) L Němečková (Czech Republic) H Vildová	**6**	5	5

Quarterfinals
1	(Netherlands) K Boogert (Croatia) M Lučić
Q	(Spain) **G León García** (Spain) **C Torrens Valero**	**w/o**
4	(Czech Republic) R Bobková (Czech Republic) E Melicharová	4	2
(Austria) **K Kschwendt** (Russia) **E Kulikovskaya**	**6**	**6**
WC	(Czech Republic) S Kleinová (Croatia) J Kostanić	4	2
(Slovenia) **T Križan** (Slovenia) **K Srebotnik**	**6**	**6**
(Argentina) M-F Landa (Germany) M Weingärtner	4	4
(Hungary) **V Csurgo** (Czech Republic) **P Langrová**	**6**	**6**

Semifinals
Q	(Spain) G León García (Spain) C Torrens Valero	5	4
(Austria) **K Kschwendt** (Russia) **E Kulikovskaya**	**7**	**6**
(Slovenia) **T Križan** (Slovenia) **K Srebotnik**	**6**	**6**
(Hungary) V Csurgo (Czech Republic) P Langrová	1	2

Final
(Austria) Karin Kschwendt (Russia) Evgenia Kulikovskaya	6	1
(Slovenia) **Tina Križan** (Slovenia) **Katarina Srebotnik**	**7**	**6**
