= 2000 Toray Pan Pacific Open – Doubles =

Doubles
- 2000 Toray Pan Pacific Open

Final
- Champions: (Switzerland) Martina Hingis (France) Mary Pierce
- Runners-up: (France) Alexandra Fusai (France) Nathalie Tauziat
- Score: 6–4, 6–1

Events
Singles	Doubles
← 1999 ·	Toray Pan Pacific Open	· 2001 →

Lindsay Davenport and Natasha Zvereva were the defending champions, but Davenport did not compete this year. Zvereva teamed up with Katarina Srebotnik and lost in quarterfinals to Lisa Raymond and Rennae Stubbs.

Martina Hingis and Mary Pierce won the title by defeating Alexandra Fusai and Nathalie Tauziat 6–4, 6–1 in the final.

== Seeds ==
1. (United States) Lisa Raymond / (Australia) Rennae Stubbs (semifinals)
2. (Russia) Anna Kournikova / (Japan) Ai Sugiyama (first round)
3. (Switzerland) Martina Hingis / (France) Mary Pierce (champions)
4. (France) Alexandra Fusai / (France) Nathalie Tauziat (final)

== Draw ==
=== Key ===
- Q = Qualifier
- WC = Wild card
- LL = Lucky loser
- Alt = Alternate
- SE = Special exempt
- PR = Protected ranking
- ITF = ITF entry
- JE = Junior exempt
- w/o = Walkover
- r = Retired
- d = Defaulted
- SR = Special ranking

=== Draw ===
First round
1	(United States) L Raymond (Australia) R Stubbs	6	7^{7}
(Belgium) E Callens (United States) L Wild	1	6^{4}
(United States) E deLone (Australia) N Pratt	1	4
(Slovenia) K Srebotnik (Belarus) N Zvereva	6	6
3	(Switzerland) M Hingis (France) M Pierce	6	6
(Slovakia) K Habšudová (Spain) A Ortuño	1	3
(Slovenia) T Križan (France) A-G Sidot	w	/	o
(Russia) L Krasnoroutskaya (Russia) T Panova
(Japan) R Hiraki (Japan) Y Yoshida	7	6^{6}	6^{6}
(United States) N Arendt (United States) K Po	5	7^{8}	7^{8}
(United States) C Rubin (France) S Testud	3	4
4	(France) A Fusai (France) N Tauziat	6	6
(United States) D Graham (Japan) N Miyagi	6	3	2
(South Africa) A Coetzer (United States) A Stevenson	1	6	6
(Zimbabwe) C Black (Kazakhstan) I Selyutina	2	6	6
2	(Russia) A Kournikova (Japan) A Sugiyama	6	3	2

Quarterfinals
1	(United States) L Raymond (Australia) R Stubbs	6	6
(Slovenia) K Srebotnik (Belarus) N Zvereva	3	0
3	(Switzerland) M Hingis (France) M Pierce	6	6
(Slovenia) T Križan (France) A-G Sidot	4	3
(United States) N Arendt (United States) K Po
4	(France) A Fusai (France) N Tauziat	w	/	o
(South Africa) A Coetzer (United States) A Stevenson	4	7^{7}	6
(Zimbabwe) C Black (Kazakhstan) I Selyutina	6	6^{3}	4

Semifinals
1	(United States) L Raymond (Australia) R Stubbs	3	4
3	(Switzerland) M Hingis (France) M Pierce	6	6
4	(France) A Fusai (France) N Tauziat	6	6
(South Africa) A Coetzer (United States) A Stevenson	3	3

Final
3	(Switzerland) M Hingis (France) M Pierce	6	6
4	(France) A Fusai (France) N Tauziat	4	1
