= 1998 Makarska International Championships – Singles =

Singles
- 1998 Makarska International Championships

Final
- Champion: (Czech Republic) Květa Hrdličková
- Runner-up: (China) Fang Li
- Score: 6–3, 6–1

Details
- Draw: 32
- Seeds: 8

Events
Singles	Doubles
Makarska International Championships

Květa Hrdličková won in the final 6–3, 6–1 against Fang Li.

== Seeds ==
A champion seed is indicated in bold text while text in italics indicates the round in which that seed was eliminated.

1. (China) Fang Li (final)
2. (Croatia) Mirjana Lučić (second round)
3. (Czech Republic) Sandra Kleinová (first round)
4. (Spain) Gala León García (semifinals)
5. (Spain) Cristina Torrens Valero (second round)
6. (France) Nathalie Dechy (second round)
7. n/a
8. (Germany) Elena Wagner (first round)
9. (Czech Republic) Lenka Němečková (semifinals)

== Draw ==
=== Key ===
- Q = Qualifier
- WC = Wild card
- LL = Lucky loser
- Alt = Alternate
- ITF = ITF entry
- PR = Protected ranking
- SR = Special ranking
- SE = Special exempt
- JE = Junior exempt
- JR = Junior Accelerator Programme entrant
- CO = College Accelerator Programme entrant
- NG = Next Gen Accelerator Program entrant
- w/o = Walkover
- r = Retired
- d = Defaulted

First round
1	(China) **F Li**	**6**	**6**
(Bulgaria) P Stoyanova	1	1
(Czech Republic) R Bobková	**6**	3	3
Q	(Italy) **Ant. Serra Zanetti**	3	**6**	**6**
(Argentina) **P Suárez**	**7**	**6**
(Austria) S Dopfer	5	1
LL	(Germany) **J Abe**	**6**	**6**
8	(Germany) E Wagner	3	1
4	(Spain) **G León García**	**6**	4	**6**
(Austria) K Kschwendt	1	**6**	4
WC	(Croatia) **J Kostanić**	**6**	**6**
WC	(Croatia) S Talaja	4	0
(Spain) **A Alcázar**	**6**	**6**
(Russia) E Kulikovskaya	2	1
(France) A Cocheteux	**6**	4	5
6	(France) **N Dechy**	4	**6**	**7**
9	(Czech Republic) **L Němečková**	**6**	5	**6**
(Italy) F Perfetti	3	**7**	2
(France) É Loit	**6**	2	0
Q	(Zimbabwe) **C Black**	4	**6**	**6**
LL	(Slovenia) T Križan	3	3
(Germany) **S Klösel**	**6**	**6**
Q	(Italy) **Adr. Serra Zanetti**	**6**	4	**6**
3	(Czech Republic) S Kleinová	4	**6**	4
5	(Spain) **C Torrens Valero**	5	**6**	**6**
(Czech Republic) P Langrová	**7**	0	0
(Ukraine) **O Lugina**	**3**
(Netherlands) K Boogert	2	r
Q	(Czech Republic) **K Hrdličková**	2	**6**	**7**
LL	(Hungary) V Csurgo	**6**	2	5
(Germany) M Weingärtner	3	6
2	(Croatia) **M Lučić**	**6**	**7**

Second round
1	(China) **F Li**	**7**	5	**7**
Q	(Italy) Ant. Serra Zanetti	5	**7**	6
(Argentina) **P Suárez**	**6**	**6**
LL	(Germany) J Abe	3	0
4	(Spain) **G León García**	**6**	**7**
WC	(Croatia) J Kostanić	4	6
(Spain) **A Alcázar**	**6**	**6**
6	(France) N Dechy	3	2
9	(Czech Republic) **L Němečková**	**6**	**7**
Q	(Zimbabwe) C Black	2	5
(Germany) **S Klösel**	**6**	**6**
Q	(Italy) Adr. Serra Zanetti	3	1
5	(Spain) C Torrens Valero	3	1
(Ukraine) **O Lugina**	**6**	**6**
Q	(Czech Republic) **K Hrdličková**	**6**	**7**
2	(Croatia) M Lučić	4	6

Quarterfinals
1	(China) **F Li**	**6**	**6**
(Argentina) P Suárez	4	2
4	(Spain) **G León García**	**7**	3	**6**
(Spain) A Alcázar	6	**6**	1
9	(Czech Republic) **L Němečková**	**7**	4	**6**
(Germany) S Klösel	6	**6**	0
(Ukraine) O Lugina	**6**	5	4
Q	(Czech Republic) **K Hrdličková**	3	**7**	**6**

Semifinals
1	(China) **F Li**	**6**	**6**
4	(Spain) G León García	2	1
9	(Czech Republic) L Němečková	1	3
Q	(Czech Republic) **K Hrdličková**	**6**	**6**

Final
1	(China) Fang Li	3	1
Q	(Czech Republic) **Květa Hrdličková**	**6**	**6**
