= 2002 Toray Pan Pacific Open – Doubles =

Doubles
- 2002 Toray Pan Pacific Open

Final
- Champions: (United States) Lisa Raymond (Australia) Rennae Stubbs
- Runners-up: (Belgium) Els Callens (Italy) Roberta Vinci
- Score: 6–1, 6–1

Details
- Draw: 16 (2WC/1Q)
- Seeds: 4

Events
Singles	Doubles
- Pan Pacific Open

Lisa Raymond and Rennae Stubbs successfully defended their title by defeating Els Callens and Roberta Vinci 6–1, 6–1 in the final.

It was the 29th title for Raymond and the 33rd title for Stubbs in their respective careers. It was also the 2nd title for the pair during this season, after their previous win at Sydney.

== Seeds ==
1. (United States) Lisa Raymond / (Australia) Rennae Stubbs (champions)
2. (Zimbabwe) Cara Black / (Russia) Elena Likhovtseva (first round)
3. (United States) Nicole Arendt / (South Africa) Liezel Huber (first round)
4. (Belgium) Els Callens / (Italy) Roberta Vinci (final)

== Draw ==
Key

- Q = Qualifier
- WC = Wild card
- LL = Lucky loser
- Alt = Alternate
- ITF = ITF entry
- PR = Protected ranking
- SR = Special ranking
- SE = Special exempt
- JE = Junior exempt
- JR = Junior Accelerator Programme entrant
- CO = College Accelerator Programme entrant
- NG = Next Gen Accelerator Program entrant
- w/o = Walkover
- r = Retired
- d = Defaulted

=== Draw ===
First round
1	(United States) L Raymond (Australia) R Stubbs	6	6
(South Africa) A Coetzer (United States) L McNeil	1	3
(Chinese Taipei) J Lee (Indonesia) W Prakusya	6	3	6
Q	(Russia) E Dementieva (Bulgaria) M Maleeva	2	6	3
3	(United States) N Arendt (South Africa) L Huber	3	7^{7}	5
(Argentina) ME Salerni (Argentina) P Tarabini	6	6^{3}	7
(Federal Republic of Yugoslavia) J Dokic (Uzbekistan) I Tulyaganova	6	6
(Spain) M Serna (Sweden) Å Svensson	1	4
WC	(Czech Republic) D Bedáňová (Japan) A Sugiyama	3	6	4
(United States) K Po-Messerli (Australia) N Pratt	6	1	6
(Italy) T Garbin (Italy) R Grande	3	6	1
4	(Belgium) E Callens (Italy) R Vinci	6	4	6
(Slovenia) T Križan (Slovenia) K Srebotnik	4	6	5
(Italy) S Farina Elia (Austria) B Schett	6	4	7
WC	(United States) M Seles (France) S Testud	6	6
2	(Zimbabwe) C Black (Russia) E Likhovtseva	1	3

Quarterfinals
1	(United States) L Raymond (Australia) R Stubbs	6	6
(Chinese Taipei) J Lee (Indonesia) W Prakusya	3	2
(Argentina) ME Salerni (Argentina) P Tarabini	2	7^{7}	6^{6}
(Federal Republic of Yugoslavia) J Dokic (Uzbekistan) I Tulyaganova	6	6^{3}	7^{8}
(United States) K Po-Messerli (Australia) N Pratt	6	2	2
4	(Belgium) E Callens (Italy) R Vinci	2	6	6
(Italy) S Farina Elia (Austria) B Schett	6	7
WC	(United States) M Seles (France) S Testud	4	5

Semifinals
1	(United States) L Raymond (Australia) R Stubbs	1	7	7
(Federal Republic of Yugoslavia) J Dokic (Uzbekistan) I Tulyaganova	6	5	5
4	(Belgium) E Callens (Italy) R Vinci	6	6
(Italy) S Farina Elia (Austria) B Schett	1	4

Final
1	(United States) L Raymond (Australia) R Stubbs	6	6
4	(Belgium) E Callens (Italy) R Vinci	1	1

== Qualifying ==
=== Qualifying seeds ===
1. (South Africa) Nannie de Villiers / (Kazakhstan) Irina Selyutina (first round)
2. (Australia) Alicia Molik / (United States) Katie Schlukebir (first round)

=== Quaifiers ===
1. (Russia) Elena Dementieva / (Bulgaria) Magdalena Maleeva

=== Qualifying draw ===
First round
1	(South Africa) Nannie de Villiers (Kazakhstan) Irina Selyutina	6
(Russia) Elena Dementieva (Bulgaria) Magdalena Maleeva	8
WC	(Japan) Shinobu Asagoe (Japan) Rika Fujiwara	8
2	(Australia) Alicia Molik (United States) Katie Schlukebir	2

Qualifying competition
(Russia) Elena Dementieva (Bulgaria) Magdalena Maleeva	1	6	6
WC	(Japan) Shinobu Asagoe (Japan) Rika Fujiwara	6	4	3
