= 2000 Toray Pan Pacific Open =

Women's tennis tournament

- Date: February 1–6
- Edition: 28th
- Category: Tier I
- Draw: 28S / 16D
- Prize money: $1,080,000
- Surface: Carpet / indoor
- Location: Tokyo, Japan
- Venue: Tokyo Metropolitan Gymnasium

Champions

Singles
- (Switzerland) Martina Hingis

Doubles
- (Switzerland) Martina Hingis / (France) Mary Pierce
- Pan Pacific Open

The 2000 Toray Pan Pacific Open was a women's tennis tournament played on indoor carpet courts. It was the 28th edition of the Toray Pan Pacific Open, and was part of the Tier I Series of the 2000 WTA Tour. It took place at the Tokyo Metropolitan Gymnasium in Tokyo, Japan, from February 1 through February 6, 2000. First-seeded Martina Hingis won the singles title and earned $166,000 first-prize money.

== Finals ==
=== Singles ===
(Switzerland) Martina Hingis defeated (France) Sandrine Testud 6–3, 7–5

- It was Hingis' 1st singles title of the year and the 27th of her career.

=== Doubles ===
(Switzerland) Martina Hingis / (France) Mary Pierce defeated (France) Alexandra Fusai / (France) Nathalie Tauziat 6–4, 6–1
