= Liezel Huber =

South African-American tennis player (born 1976)

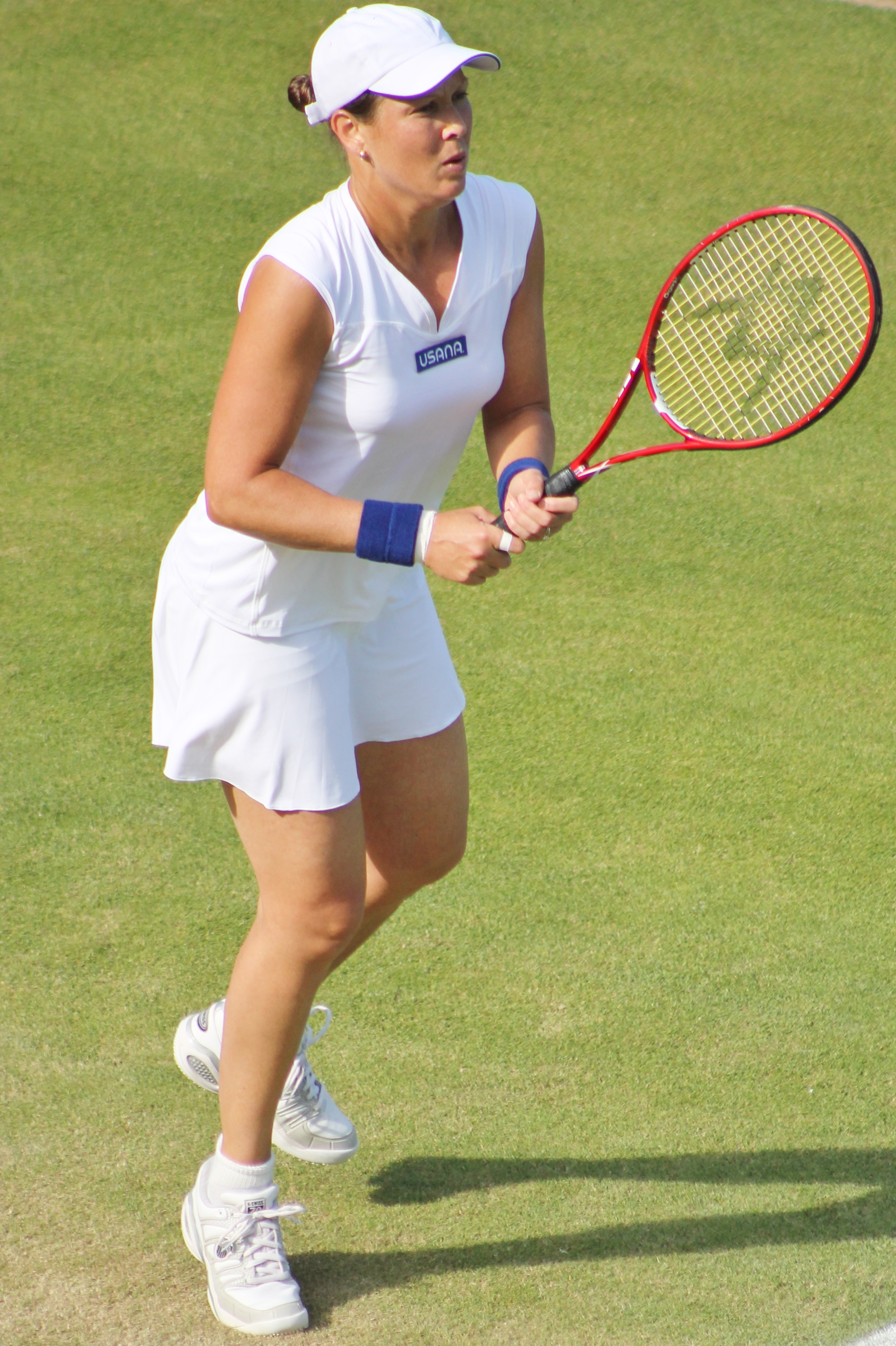
- Liezel Huber in action at Wimbledon 2013
- Country (sports): South Africa (until 12 August 2007); United States (since 13 August 2007)
- Residence: New York, U.S.
- Born: 21 August 1976 (age 49) Durban, South Africa
- Height: 5 ft 11 in (1.80 m)
- Turned pro: 1993
- Retired: 2017
- Plays: Right-handed (two-handed backhand)
- Prize money: $6,303,795

Singles
- Career record: 175–159
- Career titles: 0
- Highest ranking: No. 131 (29 March 1999)

Grand Slam singles results
- Australian Open: Q3 (2002)
- French Open: 2R (1998)
- Wimbledon: Q2 (2002)
- US Open: 1R (1998)

Doubles
- Career record: 790-395
- Career titles: 53 WTA, 11 ITF
- Highest ranking: No. 1 (12 November 2007)

Grand Slam doubles results
- Australian Open: W (2007)
- French Open: F (2005)
- Wimbledon: W (2005, 2007)
- US Open: W (2008, 2011)

Other doubles tournaments
- Tour Finals: W (2007, 2008, 2011)
- Olympic Games: SF – 4th (2012)

Mixed doubles
- Career titles: 2

Grand Slam mixed doubles results
- Australian Open: F (2005)
- French Open: W (2009)
- Wimbledon: F (2001)
- US Open: W (2010)

Other mixed doubles tournaments
- Olympic Games: 1R (2012)

Liezel Huber (née Horn; born 21 August 1976) is a South African-American retired tennis player who represented the United States internationally since August 2007. Huber has won four Grand Slam titles in women's doubles with partner Cara Black, one with Lisa Raymond, and two mixed doubles titles with Bob Bryan. On 12 November 2007, she became the co-world No. 1 in doubles with Cara Black. On 19 April 2010, Huber became the sole No. 1 for the first time in her career.

== Personal life ==
At age 15, she moved from South Africa to the United States to attend the Van Der Meer Tennis Academy in Hilton Head, South Carolina in 1992. Huber has since resided in the U.S. and became a naturalized American citizen in July 2007. She married Tony Huber, an American, in February 2000. In 2005, she started a foundation, Liezel's Cause, to raise money and gather basic supplies to assist the victims of Hurricane Katrina.

She competed for the United States in the 2008 Beijing Olympics in doubles, partnering with former World No. 1 (in both singles and doubles) Lindsay Davenport; the pair lost in the quarterfinals. At the 2012 London Olympics, she teamed with Lisa Raymond. Together they reached the semi-finals, losing to Hlaváčková and Hradecká of the Czech Republic. They then lost the bronze medal match to Kirilenko and Petrova of Russia. In the mixed doubles she teamed with Bob Bryan but lost in the first round.

== Professional career ==
Liezel Huber is primarily a doubles specialist, having achieved one of the best careers in this discipline. She has won 64 women's doubles titles in her career, of which 53 are on the WTA Tour and 11 on the ITF Women's Circuit. In singles, the greatest result in her career was reaching the quarterfinals at the tournament in Pattaya City in 2001, where she lost to Henrieta Nagyová. She participated in two Grand Slam singles main draws, losing to Lindsay Davenport in the second round of the 1998 French Open. She lost in the 1999 US Open first round to Raluca Sandu. Her highest singles ranking was world no. 131, which she achieved on 29 March 1999. She enjoyed the majority of her first eight years on tour on the ITF Circuit.

Huber has enjoyed successful women's partnerships with Magdalena Maleeva, Ai Sugiyama, Martina Navratilova, Lindsay Davenport, Cara Black, Sania Mirza, Nadia Petrova, Bethanie Mattek-Sands, María José Martínez Sánchez, and Lisa Raymond. Huber has been in the final of all four Grand Slams, winning in all except for the French Open. She has won a total of five Grand Slam women's doubles titles with three partners in ten finals with four partners, and finished as a titlist in two of her five mixed doubles finals.

Huber and her Zimbabwean partner Black made up what many tennis experts regard as one of the greatest women's doubles teams in history between mid-2005. and early 2010. Together, the pair reached seven women's doubles finals, winning four. The duo won a total of 29 titles together on the WTA Tour. The partnership suddenly broke up in April 2010.

Huber has also enjoyed success in mixed doubles, winning two titles with American men's doubles legend Bob Bryan, at the 2009 French Open and 2010 US Open. She reached her first career mixed final with Bob's brother Mike at the 2001 Wimbledon Championships, and two additional finals, at the 2005 Australian Open with Kevin Ullyett, and at the 2008 US Open with Jamie Murray.

Huber has also enjoyed impressive success in the Fed Cup national competition. She logged a 9–3 record on the South Africa Fed Cup team, with all but one match being in doubles. Huber is now a major member of the United States Fed Cup team, compiling a 6–2 record in doubles play. In the competition, Huber has played with Julie Ditty, Vania King, Bethanie Mattek-Sands, Melanie Oudin, and Sloane Stephens.

Liezel Huber served as executive director of Tennis at the New York Junior Tennis & Learning Cary Leeds Center, in Bronx Crotona Park. As of 4 January 2021, she is Director of Tennis and Racquets at The River Club of New York.

== Grand Slam finals ==
=== Doubles: 10 (5–5) ===
Result	Year	Championship	Surface	Partner	Opponents	Score
Loss	2004	Wimbledon	Grass	(Japan) Ai Sugiyama	(Zimbabwe) Cara Black; (Australia) Rennae Stubbs	6–3, 7–6^{(7–5)}
Loss	2005	French Open	Clay	(Zimbabwe) Cara Black	(Spain) Virginia Ruano Pascual; (Argentina) Paola Suárez	4–6, 6–3, 6–3
Win	2005	Wimbledon	Grass	(Zimbabwe) Cara Black	(Russia) Svetlana Kuznetsova; (France) Amélie Mauresmo	6–2, 6–1
Win	2007	Australian Open	Hard	(Zimbabwe) Cara Black	(Chinese Taipei) Chan Yung-jan; (Chinese Taipei) Chuang Chia-jung	6–4, 6–7^{(4–7)}, 6–1
Win	2007	Wimbledon	Grass	(Zimbabwe) Cara Black	(Slovenia) Katarina Srebotnik (Japan) Ai Sugiyama	3–6, 6–3, 6–2
Win	2008	US Open	Hard	(Zimbabwe) Cara Black	(United States) Lisa Raymond; (Australia) Samantha Stosur	6–3, 7–6^{(10–8)}
Loss	2009	US Open	Hard	(Zimbabwe) Cara Black	(United States) Serena Williams; (United States) Venus Williams	6–2, 6–2
Loss	2010	Australian Open	Hard	(Zimbabwe) Cara Black	(United States) Serena Williams (United States) Venus Williams	6–4, 6–3
Loss	2010	US Open	Hard	(Russia) Nadia Petrova	(United States) Vania King (Kazakhstan) Yaroslava Shvedova	2–6, 6–4, 7–6^{(7–4)}
Win	2011	US Open	Hard	(United States) Lisa Raymond	(United States) Vania King (Kazakhstan) Yaroslava Shvedova	4–6, 7–6^{(7–5)}, 7–6^{(7–3)}

=== Mixed doubles: 5 (2–3) ===
Result	Year	Championship	Surface	Partner	Opponents	Score
Loss	2001	Wimbledon	Grass	(United States) Mike Bryan	(Czech Republic) Leoš Friedl (Slovakia) Daniela Hantuchová	4-6, 6–3, 6–2
Loss	2005	Australian Open	Hard	(Zimbabwe) Kevin Ullyett	(Australia) Scott Draper (Australia) Samantha Stosur	6–2, 2–6, [10–6]
Loss	2008	US Open	Hard	(United Kingdom) Jamie Murray	(India) Leander Paes (Zimbabwe) Cara Black	7–6^{(8–6)}, 6–4
Win	2009	French Open	Clay	(United States) Bob Bryan	(United States) Vania King (Brazil) Marcelo Melo	5–7, 7–6^{(7–5)}, [10–7]
Win	2010	US Open	Hard	(United States) Bob Bryan	(Czech Republic) Květa Peschke; (Pakistan) Aisam-ul-Haq Qureshi	6–4, 6–4

== Olympics ==
=== Doubles: 1 Bronze medal match (0–1) ===
Result	Year	Championship	Surface	Partner	Opponents	Score
4th place	2012	London Olympics	Grass	(United States) Lisa Raymond	(Russia) Maria Kirilenko (Russia) Nadia Petrova	6–4, 4–6, 1–6

== WTA career finals ==
=== Doubles: 92 (53–39) ===
Winner — Legend
Grand Slam tournaments (5–5)
Tour Championships (3–1)
Premier Mandatory & Premier 5 (14–11)
Premier (19–15)
International (12–7)

Result	No.	Date	Tournament	Surface	Partner	Opponents	Score
Loss	1.	Jul 1998	Warsaw Open	Clay	(Austria) Karin Kschwendt	(Ukraine) Olga Lugina (Slovakia) Karina Habšudová	7–6^{(7–2)}, 7–5
Loss	2.	Nov 2000	Commonwealth Bank Tennis Classic, Kuala Lumpur	Hard	(Canada) Vanessa Webb	(Slovakia) Henrieta Nagyová (Austria) Sylvia Plischke	6–4, 7–6^{(7–4)}
Win	1.	Sep 2001	Toyota Princess Cup, Tokyo	Hard	(Zimbabwe) Cara Black	(Belgium) Kim Clijsters (Japan) Ai Sugiyama	6–1, 6–3
Win	2.	Oct 2001	Japan Open Tennis Championships, Tokyo	Hard	(Australia) Rachel McQuillan	(Chinese Taipei) Janet Lee (Indonesia) Wynne Prakusya	6–2, 6–0
Win	3.	Oct 2001	China Open, Shanghai	Hard	(Czech Republic) Lenka Němečková	(Australia) Evie Dominikovic (Thailand) Tamarine Tanasugarn	6–0, 7–5
Loss	3.	Nov 2001	PTT Pattaya Open	Hard	(Indonesia) Wynne Prakusya	(Sweden) Åsa Carlsson (Uzbekistan) Iroda Tulyaganova	4–6, 6–3, 6–3
Win	4.	Jan 2002	Auckland Open	Hard	(United States) Nicole Arendt	(Czech Republic) Květa Hrdličková (Slovakia) Henrieta Nagyová	7–5, 6–4
Win	5.	Mar 2003	Miami Masters	Hard	(Bulgaria) Magdalena Maleeva	(Japan) Shinobu Asagoe (Japan) Nana Miyagi	6–4, 3–6, 7–5
Win	6.	Apr 2003	Sarasota Clay Court Classic	Clay	(United States) Martina Navratilova	(Japan) Shinobu Asagoe (Japan) Nana Miyagi	7–6^{(10–8)}, 6–3
Win	7.	May 2003	Warsaw Open	Clay	(Bulgaria) Magdalena Maleeva	(Greece) Eleni Daniilidou (Italy) Francesca Schiavone	3–6, 6–4, 6–2
Win	8.	May 2003	Madrid Open	Clay	(United States) Jill Craybas	(Italy) Rita Grande (Indonesia) Angelique Widjaja	6–4, 7–6^{(8–6)}
Win	9.	Oct 2003	Generali Ladies Linz	Hard (i)	(Japan) Ai Sugiyama	(France) Marion Bartoli (Italy) Silvia Farina Elia	6–1, 7–6^{(8–6)}
Loss	4.	Jan 2004	Brisbane International, Gold Coast	Hard	(Bulgaria) Magdalena Maleeva	(Russia) Svetlana Kuznetsova (Russia) Elena Likhovtseva	6–3, 6–4
Win	10.	Feb 2004	Hyderabad Open	Hard	(India) Sania Mirza	(China) Li Ting (China) Sun Tiantian	7–6^{(7–1)}, 6–4
Loss	5.	Jul 2004	Wimbledon	Grass	(Japan) Ai Sugiyama	(Zimbabwe) Cara Black (Australia) Rennae Stubbs	6–3, 7–6^{(7–5)}
Loss	6.	Aug 2004	Rogers Cup, Montreal	Hard	(Thailand) Tamarine Tanasugarn	(Japan) Ai Sugiyama (Japan) Shinobu Asagoe	6–0, 6–3
Loss	7.	Nov 2004	Advanta Championships of Philadelphia	Hard (i)	(United States) Corina Morariu	(United States) Lisa Raymond (Australia) Alicia Molik	7–5, 6–4
Loss	8.	Feb 2005	Qatar Total Open, Doha	Hard	(Zimbabwe) Cara Black	(Italy) Francesca Schiavone (Australia) Alicia Molik	6–3, 6–4
Loss	9.	May 2005	Qatar Total German Open, Berlin	Clay	(Zimbabwe) Cara Black	(Russia) Vera Zvonareva (Russia) Elena Likhovtseva	4–6, 6–4, 6–3
Win	11.	May 2005	Rome Masters	Clay	(Zimbabwe) Cara Black	(Russia) Maria Kirilenko (Spain) Anabel Medina Garrigues	6–0, 4–6, 6–1
Loss	10.	Jun 2005	French Open	Clay	(Zimbabwe) Cara Black	(Spain) Virginia Ruano Pascual (Argentina) Paola Suárez	4–6, 6–3, 6–3
Win	12.	Jun 2005	Wimbledon	Grass	(Zimbabwe) Cara Black	(Russia) Svetlana Kuznetsova (France) Amélie Mauresmo	6–2, 6–1
Win	13.	Feb 2006	Bangalore Open	Hard	(India) Sania Mirza	(Russia) Anastasia Rodionova (Russia) Elena Vesnina	6–3, 6–3
Loss	11.	Mar 2006	Sony Ericcson Open, Miami	Hard	(United States) Martina Navratilova	(United States) Lisa Raymond (Australia) Samantha Stosur	6–4, 7–5
Loss	12.	Apr 2006	MPS Group Championships, Ponte Vedra Beach	Clay	(India) Sania Mirza	(Japan) Shinobu Asagoe (Slovenia) Katarina Srebotnik	6–2, 6–4
Win	14.	May 2006	Internationaux de Strasbourg	Clay	(United States) Martina Navratilova	(Germany) Martina Müller (Romania) Andreea Vanc	6–2, 7–6^{(7–1)}
Loss	13.	Jun 2006	DFS Classic, Birmingham	Grass	(United States) Jill Craybas	(Serbia) Jelena Janković (China) Li Na	6–2, 6–4
Loss	14.	Jun 2006	Eastbourne International	Grass	(United States) Martina Navratilova	(Russia) Svetlana Kuznetsova (France) Amélie Mauresmo	6–2, 6–4
Win	15.	Sep 2006	Sunfeast Open, Kolkata	Hard	(India) Sania Mirza	(Ukraine) Yuliya Beygelzimer (Ukraine) Yuliana Fedak	6–4, 6–0
Loss	15.	Oct 2006	Fortis Championships Luxembourg	Hard (i)	(Germany) Anna-Lena Grönefeld	(Italy) Francesca Schiavone (Czech Republic) Květa Peschke	2–6, 6–4, 6–1
Loss	16.	Oct 2006	Zürich Open	Hard (i)	(Slovenia) Katarina Srebotnik	(Zimbabwe) Cara Black (Australia) Rennae Stubbs	7–5, 7–5
Win	16.	Jan 2007	Australian Open	Hard	(Zimbabwe) Cara Black	(Chinese Taipei) Chan Yung-jan (Chinese Taipei) Chuang Chia-jung	6–4, 6–7^{(4–7)}, 6–1
Win	17.	Feb 2007	Open Gaz de France, Paris	Carpet (i)	(Zimbabwe) Cara Black	(Czech Republic) Gabriela Navrátilová (Czech Republic) Vladimíra Uhlířová	6–2, 6–0
Win	18.	Feb 2007	Proximus Diamond Games, Antwerp	Carpet (i)	(Zimbabwe) Cara Black	(Russia) Elena Likhovtseva (Russia) Elena Vesnina	7–5, 4–6, 6–1
Win	19.	Feb 2007	Dubai Tennis Championships	Hard	(Zimbabwe) Cara Black	(Russia) Svetlana Kuznetsova (Australia) Alicia Molik	7–6^{(8–6)}, 6–4
Loss	17.	Apr 2007	Sony Ericcson Open, Miami	Hard	(Zimbabwe) Cara Black	(United States) Lisa Raymond (Australia) Samantha Stosur	6–4, 3–6, [10–2]
Win	20.	Jun 2007	Wimbledon	Grass	(Zimbabwe) Cara Black	(Slovenia) Katarina Srebotnik (Japan) Ai Sugiyama	3–6, 6–3, 6–2
Win	21.	Jul 2007	Acura Classic, San Diego	Hard	(Zimbabwe) Cara Black	(Belarus) Victoria Azarenka (Russia) Anna Chakvetadze	7–5, 6–4
Loss	18.	Aug 2007	Canada Masters, Toronto	Hard	(Zimbabwe) Cara Black	(Slovenia) Katarina Srebotnik (Japan) Ai Sugiyama	6–4, 2–6, [10–5]
Loss	19.	Aug 2007	New Haven Open at Yale	Hard	(Zimbabwe) Cara Black	(India) Sania Mirza (Italy) Mara Santangelo	6–1, 6–2
Win	22.	Oct 2007	Kremlin Cup, Moscow	Carpet	(Zimbabwe) Cara Black	(Belarus) Victoria Azarenka (Belarus) Tatiana Poutchek	4–6, 6–1, [10–7]
Win	23.	Oct 2007	Generali Ladies Linz	Hard (i)	(Zimbabwe) Cara Black	(Slovenia) Katarina Srebotnik (Japan) Ai Sugiyama	6–2, 3–6, [10–8]
Win	24.	Nov 2007	WTA Tour Championships, Madrid	Hard (i)	(Zimbabwe) Cara Black	(Slovenia) Katarina Srebotnik (Japan) Ai Sugiyama	5–7, 6–3, [10–8]
Win	25.	Feb 2008	Proximus Diamond Games, Antwerp	Carpet	(Zimbabwe) Cara Black	(Czech Republic) Květa Peschke (Japan) Ai Sugiyama	6–1, 6–3
Loss	20.	Feb 2008	Qatar Total Open, Doha	Hard	(Zimbabwe) Cara Black	(Australia) Rennae Stubbs (Czech Republic) Květa Peschke	6–1, 5–7, [10–7]
Win	26.	Mar 2008	Dubai Tennis Championships	Hard	(Zimbabwe) Cara Black	(China) Yan Zi (China) Zheng Jie	7–5, 6–2
Loss	21.	Apr 2008	Miami Masters	Hard	(Zimbabwe) Cara Black	(Slovenia) Katarina Srebotnik (Japan) Ai Sugiyama	7–5, 4–6, [10–3]
Win	27.	May 2008	German Open, Berlin	Clay	(Zimbabwe) Cara Black	(Spain) Nuria Llagostera Vives (Spain) María José Martínez Sánchez	3–6, 6–2, [10–2]
Win	28.	Jun 2008	DFS Classic, Birmingham	Grass	(Zimbabwe) Cara Black	(Spain) Virginia Ruano Pascual (France) Séverine Brémond	6–2, 6–1
Win	29.	Jun 2008	International Women's Open, Eastbourne	Grass	(Zimbabwe) Cara Black	(Czech Republic) Květa Peschke (Australia) Rennae Stubbs	2–6, 6–0, [10–8]
Win	30.	Jul 2008	Bank of the West Classic, Stanford	Hard	(Zimbabwe) Cara Black	(Russia) Elena Vesnina (Russia) Vera Zvonareva	6–4, 6–3
Win	31.	Aug 2008	Canada Masters, Montreal	Hard	(Zimbabwe) Cara Black	(Russia) Maria Kirilenko (Italy) Flavia Pennetta	6–1, 6–1
Win	32.	Sep 2008	US Open	Hard	(Zimbabwe) Cara Black	(Australia) Samantha Stosur (United States) Lisa Raymond	6–4, 7–6^{(8–6)}
Loss	22.	Oct 2008	Kremlin Cup, Moscow	Hard (i)	(Zimbabwe) Cara Black	(Russia) Nadia Petrova (Slovenia) Katarina Srebotnik	6–4, 6–4
Win	33.	Oct 2008	Zurich Open	Hard (i)	(Zimbabwe) Cara Black	(Germany) Anna-Lena Grönefeld (Switzerland) Patty Schnyder	6–1, 7–6^{(7–3)}
Loss	23.	Oct 2008	Generali Ladies Linz	Hard (i)	(Zimbabwe) Cara Black	(Slovenia) Katarina Srebotnik (Japan) Ai Sugiyama	6–4, 7–5
Win	34.	Nov 2008	WTA Tour Championships, Doha	Hard	(Zimbabwe) Cara Black	(Czech Republic) Květa Peschke (Australia) Rennae Stubbs	6–1, 7–5
Win	35.	Feb 2009	Open GDF Suez, Paris	Hard (i)	(Zimbabwe) Cara Black	(Czech Republic) Květa Peschke (United States) Lisa Raymond	6–4, 3–6, [10–4]
Win	36.	Feb 2009	Dubai Tennis Championships	Hard	(Zimbabwe) Cara Black	(Russia) Maria Kirilenko (Poland) Agnieszka Radwańska	6–3, 6–3
Win	37.	May 2009	Mutua Madrileña Madrid Open	Clay	(Zimbabwe) Cara Black	(Czech Republic) Květa Peschke (United States) Lisa Raymond	4–6, 6–3, [10–6]
Win	38.	Jun 2009	Aegon Classic, Birmingham	Grass	(Zimbabwe) Cara Black	(United States) Raquel Kops-Jones (United States) Abigail Spears	6–1, 6–4
Win	39.	Aug 2009	Cincinnati Masters	Hard	(Zimbabwe) Cara Black	(Spain) Nuria Llagostera Vives (Spain) María José Martínez Sánchez	6–3, 0–6, [10–2]
Loss	24.	Sep 2009	US Open	Hard	(Zimbabwe) Cara Black	(United States) Serena Williams (United States) Venus Williams	6–2, 6–2
Loss	25.	Nov 2009	WTA Tour Championships, Doha	Hard	(Zimbabwe) Cara Black	(Spain) Nuria Llagostera Vives (Spain) María José Martínez Sánchez	7–6^{(7–0)}, 5–7, [10–7]
Win	40.	Jan 2010	Auckland Open	Hard	(Zimbabwe) Cara Black	(South Africa) Natalie Grandin (United States) Laura Granville	7–6^{(7–4)}, 6–2
Win	41.	Jan 2010	Medibank International Sydney	Hard	(Zimbabwe) Cara Black	(Italy) Tathiana Garbin (Russia) Nadia Petrova	6–1, 3–6, [10–3]
Loss	26.	Jan 2010	Australian Open	Hard	(Zimbabwe) Cara Black	(United States) Serena Williams (United States) Venus Williams	6–4, 6–3
Loss	27.	Feb 2010	Open GDF Suez, Paris	Hard (i)	(Zimbabwe) Cara Black	(Czech Republic) Barbora Záhlavová-Strýcová (Czech Republic) Iveta Benešová	w/o
Win	42.	Apr 2010	Family Circle Cup, Charleston	Clay	(Russia) Nadia Petrova	(United States) Vania King (Netherlands) Michaëlla Krajicek	6–3, 6–4
Loss	28.	Jun 2010	Aegon Classic, Birmingham	Grass	(United States) Bethanie Mattek-Sands	(Zimbabwe) Cara Black (United States) Lisa Raymond	6–3, 3–2 ret.
Win	43.	Aug 2010	Bank of the West Classic, Stanford	Hard	(United States) Lindsay Davenport	(Chinese Taipei) Chan Yung-jan (China) Zheng Jie	7–5, 6–7^{(8–10)}, [10–8]
Loss	29.	Sep 2010	US Open	Hard	(Russia) Nadia Petrova	(Kazakhstan) Yaroslava Shvedova (United States) Vania King	2–6, 6–4, 7–6^{(7–4)}
Win	44.	Feb 2011	Dubai Tennis Championships	Hard	(Spain) María José Martínez Sánchez	(Czech Republic) Květa Peschke (Slovenia) Katarina Srebotnik	7–6^{(7–5)}, 6–3
Loss	30.	Feb 2011	Qatar Ladies Open, Doha	Hard	(Russia) Nadia Petrova	(Czech Republic) Květa Peschke (Slovenia) Katarina Srebotnik	7–5, 6–7^{(2–7)}, [10–8]
Loss	31.	Apr 2011	Miami	Hard	(Russia) Nadia Petrova	(Slovakia) Daniela Hantuchová (Poland) Agnieszka Radwańska	7–6^{(7–5)}, 2–6, [10–8]
Loss	32.	Jun 2011	Aegon International, Eastbourne	Grass	(United States) Lisa Raymond	(Czech Republic) Květa Peschke (Slovenia) Katarina Srebotnik	6–3, 6–0
Loss	33.	Jul 2011	Bank of the West Classic, Stanford	Hard	(United States) Lisa Raymond	(Belarus) Victoria Azarenka (Russia) Maria Kirilenko	6–1, 6–3
Win	45.	Aug 2011	Rogers Cup, Toronto	Hard	(United States) Lisa Raymond	(Belarus) Victoria Azarenka (Russia) Maria Kirilenko	w/o
Win	46.	Sep 2011	US Open	Hard	(United States) Lisa Raymond	(United States) Vania King (Kazakhstan) Yaroslava Shvedova	4–6, 7–6^{(7–5)}, 7–6^{(7–3)}
Win	47.	Oct 2011	Toray Pan Pacific Open, Tokyo	Hard	(United States) Lisa Raymond	(Argentina) Gisela Dulko (Italy) Flavia Pennetta	7–6^{(7–4)}, 0–6, [10–6]
Win	48.	Oct 2011	WTA Championships, Istanbul	Hard (i)	(United States) Lisa Raymond	(Czech Republic) Květa Peschke (Slovenia) Katarina Srebotnik	6–4, 6–4
Loss	34.	Jan 2012	Sydney International	Hard	(United States) Lisa Raymond	(Czech Republic) Květa Peschke (Slovenia) Katarina Srebotnik	6–1, 4–6, [13–11]
Win	49.	Feb 2012	Open GDF Suez, Paris	Hard (i)	(United States) Lisa Raymond	(Germany) Anna-Lena Grönefeld (Croatia) Petra Martić	7–6^{(7–3)}, 6–1
Win	50.	Feb 2012	Qatar Ladies Open, Doha	Hard	(United States) Lisa Raymond	(United States) Raquel Kops-Jones (United States) Abigail Spears	6–3, 6–1
Win	51.	Feb 2012	Dubai Tennis Championships	Hard	(United States) Lisa Raymond	(India) Sania Mirza (Russia) Elena Vesnina	6–2, 6–1
Win	52.	Mar 2012	Indian Wells Masters	Hard	(United States) Lisa Raymond	(India) Sania Mirza (Russia) Elena Vesnina	6–2, 6–3
Loss	35.	Jun 2012	Birmingham	Grass	(United States) Lisa Raymond	(Hungary) Tímea Babos (Chinese Taipei) Hsieh Su-wei	5–7, 7–6^{(7–2)}, [8–10]
Loss	36.	Jun 2012	Eastbourne	Grass	(United States) Lisa Raymond	(Spain) Nuria Llagostera Vives (Spain) María José Martínez Sánchez	4–6, ret.
Win	53.	Aug 2012	New Haven Open at Yale	Hard	(United States) Lisa Raymond	(Czech Republic) Andrea Hlaváčková (Czech Republic) Lucie Hradecká	4–6, 6–0, [10–4]
Loss	37.	Feb 2013	Open GDF Suez, Paris	Hard (i)	(Czech Republic) Andrea Hlaváčková	(Italy) Sara Errani (Italy) Roberta Vinci	1–6, 1–6
Loss	38.	Apr 2013	Family Circle Cup, Charleston	Clay	(Czech Republic) Andrea Hlaváčková	(France) Kristina Mladenovic (Czech Republic) Lucie Šafářová	3–6, 6–7^{(6–8)}
Loss	39.	Sep 2013	Toray Pan Pacific Open, Tokyo	Hard	(Chinese Taipei) Chan Hao-ching	(Zimbabwe) Cara Black (India) Sania Mirza	4–6, 6–0, [9–11]

== ITF finals ==
=== Singles (0–4) ===
$100,000 tournaments
$75,000 tournaments
$50,000 tournaments
$25,000 tournaments
$10,000 tournaments

Result	No.	Date	Tournament	Surface	Opponent	Score
Loss	1.	27 July 1994	Salisbury, United States	Hard	(United States) Camille Benjamin	6–3, 2–6, 1–6
Loss	2.	3 June 1996	Skopje, Macedonia	Clay	(Netherlands) Linda Sentis	4–6, 0–6
Loss	3.	3 August 1997	Lexington, United States	Hard	(United States) Karin Miller	7–6^{(7–2)}, 1–6, 2–6
Loss	4.	28 April 2002	Dothan, United States	Clay	(Venezuela) Milagros Sequera	6–7^{(7–9)}, 6–4, 1–6

=== Doubles (11–9) ===
Result	No.	Date	Tournament	Surface	Partner	Opponents	Score
Loss	1.	29 March 1992	Harare, Zimbabwe	Hard	(United Kingdom) Jennie McMahon	(Zimbabwe) Julia Muir (Zimbabwe) Sally McDonald	6–2, 4–6, 5–7
Loss	2.	12 April 1992	Gaborone, Botswana	Hard	(South Africa) Estelle Gevers	(Namibia) Elizma Nortje (South Africa) Louise Venter	0–6, 7–6^{(7–2)}, 4–6
Loss	3.	23 August 1992	Cuernavaca, Mexico	Hard	(South Africa) Estelle Gevers	(Brazil) Cláudia Chabalgoity (Mexico) Isabela Petrov	5–7, 7–5, 2–6
Loss	4.	16 May 1993	Basingstoke, Great Britain	Hard	(Germany) Sabine Haas	(United Kingdom) Valda Lake (Australia) Robyn Mawdsley	6–3, 4–6, 1–6
Win	5.	4 October 1993	Pretoria, South Africa	Hard	(South Africa) Rene Mentz	(South Africa) Surina De Beer (South Africa) Karen van der Merwe	7–6^{(7–4)}, 7–5
Win	6.	8 May 1994	San Luis Potosí, Mexico	Hard	(South Africa) Mariaan de Swardt	(United States) Michelle Jackson-Nobrega (Poland) Katarzyna Teodorowicz	4–6, 6–3, 6–4
Loss	7.	24 July 1994	Salisbury, United States	Hard	(Japan) Hiroko Mochizuki	(South Africa) Mareze Joubert (Greece) Christína Papadáki	6–3, 1–6, 4–6
Win	8.	19 May 1996	Athens, Greece	Clay	(Greece) Christína Papadáki	(United States) Angela Lettiere (United States) Corina Morariu	7–5, 6–2
Win	9.	29 July 1996	Roanoke, United States	Hard	(Georgia (country)) Nino Louarsabishvili	(United States) Rebecca Jensen (United States) Shannan McCarthy	6–4, 6–4
Loss	10.	18 August 1996	Bronx, United States	Hard	(Greece) Christína Papadáki	(Finland) Nanne Dahlman (United Kingdom) Clare Wood	2–6, 3–6
Win	11.	23 March 1997	Woodlands, United States	Hard	(Belgium) Nancy Feber	(Germany) Sabine Haas (Sweden) Kristina Triska	6–1, 6–2
Loss	12.	12 October 1997	Sedona, United States	Hard	(Argentina) Paola Suárez	(Romania) Cătălina Cristea (United States) Corina Morariu	5–7, 2–6
Win	13.	29 March 1997	Woodlands, United States	Hard	(Belgium) Els Callens	(France) Nathalie Dechy (France) Lea Ghirardi	6–4, 6–2
Win	14.	10 May 1998	Cardiff, Great Britain	Clay	(Slovenia) Katarina Srebotnik	(Czech Republic) Petra Langrová (Belgium) Nancy Feber	6–4, 6–3
Loss	15.	2 August 1998	Salt Lake City, United States	Hard	(Austria) Karin Kschwendt	(South Africa) Mariaan de Swardt (United Kingdom) Samantha Smith	2–6, 2–6
Win	16.	21 September 1998	Seattle, United States	Hard	(Belgium) Els Callens	(United States) Lilia Osterloh (United States) Mashona Washington	6–2, 3–6, 6–3
Loss	17.	1 November 1998	Austin, United States	Hard	(South Africa) Nannie de Villiers	(Canada) Maureen Drake (United States) Lindsay Lee-Waters	1–6, 1–6
Win	18.	21 February 1999	Midland, United States	Hard (i)	(United Kingdom) Samantha Smith	(Germany) Kirstin Freye (Canada) Sonya Jeyaseelan	7–6^{(8–6)}, 0–6, 7–5
Win	19.	15 October 2000	Miramar, United States	Clay	(Australia) Lisa McShea	(Paraguay) Rossana de los Ríos (United States) Samantha Reeves	5–3, 4–1, 4–1
Win	20.	27 November 2000	Tucson, United States	Hard	(Hungary) Katalin Marosi	(United States) Dawn Buth (United States) Jolene Watanabe	6–4, 6–2

== Women's doubles performance timeline ==
Key
W	F	SF	QF	#R	RR	Q#	P#	DNQ	A	Z#	PO	G	S	B	NMS	NTI	P	NH

(W) winner; (F) finalist; (SF) semifinalist; (QF) quarterfinalist; (#R) rounds 4, 3, 2, 1; (RR) round-robin stage; (Q#) qualification round; (P#) preliminary round; (DNQ) did not qualify; (A) absent; (Z#) Davis/Fed Cup Zonal Group (with number indication) or (PO) play-off; (G) gold, (S) silver or (B) bronze Olympic/Paralympic medal; (NMS) not a Masters tournament; (NTI) not a Tier I tournament; (P) postponed; (NH) not held; (SR) strike rate (events won / competed); (W–L) win–loss record.

Tournament	1993	1994	1995	1996	1997	1998	1999	2000	2001	2002	2003	2004	2005	2006	2007	2008	2009	2010	2011	2012	2013	2014	SR	W–L
Grand Slam tournaments
Australian Open	A	A	2R	A	A	1R	1R	A	2R	3R	A	SF	2R	3R	W	QF	QF	F	SF	QF	3R	3R	1 / 16	37–15
French Open	A	A	1R	A	2R	1R	3R	QF	2R	SF	1R	1R	F	2R	SF	SF	SF	SF	SF	1R	1R	3R	0 / 19	38–19
Wimbledon	A	A	1R	A	1R	1R	SF	2R	1R	2R	3R	F	W	QF	W	SF	SF	SF	QF	SF	3R	2R	2 / 19	50–17
US Open	A	A	1R	1R	A	1R	QF	2R	2R	2R	QF	QF	A	3R	2R	W	F	F	W	3R	3R	A	2 / 17	41–15
Win–loss	0–0	0–0	1–4	0–1	1–2	0–4	9–4	5–3	3–4	8–4	5–3	12–4	12–2	7–4	17–2	17–3	16–4	18–4	17–3	9–4	6–4	5–3	5 / 70	165–65
Olympic Games
Summer Olympics	Not Held			A	Not Held			1R	Not Held			A	Not Held			QF	Not Held			SF	NH		0 / 3	4–3
Year-end championships
Tour Championships	A	A	A	A	A	A	A	A	A	QF	A	A	A	A	W	W	F	A	W	SF	A	A	3 / 6	7–3
Premier Mandatory tournaments
Indian Wells	Tier II			A	A	A	1R	A	2R	QF	2R	2R	2R	A	A	A	2R	QF	QF	W	1R	1R	1 / 12	16–11
Miami	A	A	2R	A	A	1R	1R	SF	SF	SF	W	QF	SF	F	F	F	2R	1R	F	1R	QF	1R	1 / 18	38–17
Madrid	Not Held																W	2R	2R	2R	1R	1R	1 / 6	4–5
Beijing	NH	Tier IV			Not Held			Tier IV			Tier II						QF	2R	SF	A	2R	A	0 / 4	4–4
Premier 5 tournaments
Dubai	Not Held								Tier II								W	SF	W	Premier			2 / 3	9–1
Doha	Not Held								Tier III			Tier II				F	Not Held		P	W	1R	2R	1 / 4	8–3
Rome	A	A	A	A	A	A	1R	A	QF	1R	QF	2R	W	2R	SF	QF	QF	SF	2R	SF	2R	2R	1 / 15	15–14
Montreal/Toronto	A	A	A	A	A	A	A	2R	1R	SF	SF	F	A	A	F	W	SF	2R	W	SF	2R	A	2 / 12	24–9
Cincinnati	Not Held											Tier III					W	SF	QF	2R	QF	A	1 / 5	10–4
Tokyo	A	A	A	A	A	A	A	A	1R	1R	A	QF	QF	A	A	A	SF	SF	W	A	F	A	1 / 8	12–7
Tier I tournaments
Charleston	A	A	A	A	A	A	A	2R	QF	1R	1R	QF	A	QF	SF	SF	Premier						0 / 8	8–8
Berlin	A	A	A	A	A	A	QF	A	2R	2R	SF	QF	F	2R	SF	W	Not Held						1 / 9	16–8
San Diego	Tier II											QF	A	QF	W	Not Held		Premier					1 / 3	7–2
Moscow	NH	Tier II			A	A	A	A	A	1R	A	A	A	QF	W	F	Premier						1 / 4	8–3
Zurich	A	A	A	A	A	A	A	A	A	1R	SF	QF	A	F	SF	T II	Not Held						0 / 5	8–4
Career statistics	1993	1994	1995	1996	1997	1998	1999	2000	2001	2002	2003	2004	2005	2006	2007	2008	2009	2010	2011	2012	2013	2014	No.	
Tournament played	1	3	14	3	5	16	13	15	26	20	21	24	15	26	23	25	21	24	24	21	20	17	377	
Titles	0	0	0	0	0	0	0	0	3	1	5	1	2	3	9	10	5	4	5	5	0	0	53	
Finals	0	0	0	0	0	1	0	1	4	1	5	5	5	9	12	14	7	8	9	8	2	0	91	
Overall win–loss	0–1	2–3	3–13	0–3	1–5	10–15	12–13	18–15	35–23	23–19	42–15	38–22	33–13	45–23	69–14	68–15	49–16	53–18	53–19	47–17	21–19	16–17	622–301	
Year-end ranking	388	112	181	130	106	57	37	43	21	18	12	11	6	17	1	1	1	3	1	8	22	51	$6,303,795	
