= 2002 Toray Pan Pacific Open =

- Date: January 29 – February 3
- Edition: 30th
- Category: Tier I
- Draw: 28S / 16D
- Surface: Carpet / indoor
- Location: Tokyo, Japan
- Venue: Tokyo Metropolitan Gymnasium

Champions

Singles
- (Switzerland) Martina Hingis

Doubles
- (United States) Lisa Raymond / (Australia) Rennae Stubbs
← 2001 ·	Pan Pacific Open	· 2003 →

The 2002 Toray Pan Pacific Open was a women's tennis tournament played on indoor carpet courts. It was the 30th edition of the Toray Pan Pacific Open, and was part of the Tier I Series of the 2002 WTA Tour. It took place at the Tokyo Metropolitan Gymnasium in Tokyo, Japan, from January 29 through February 3, 2002. First-seeded Martina Hingis won the singles title.

== Finals ==
=== Singles ===
(Switzerland) Martina Hingis defeated (United States) Monica Seles, 7–6^{(8–6)}, 4–6, 6–3

- It was Hingis' 2nd singles title of the year and the 40th of her career.

=== Doubles ===
(United States) Lisa Raymond / (Australia) Rennae Stubbs defeated (Belgium) Els Callens / (Italy) Roberta Vinci, 6–1, 6–1
