= Katarina Srebotnik =

Slovenian tennis player

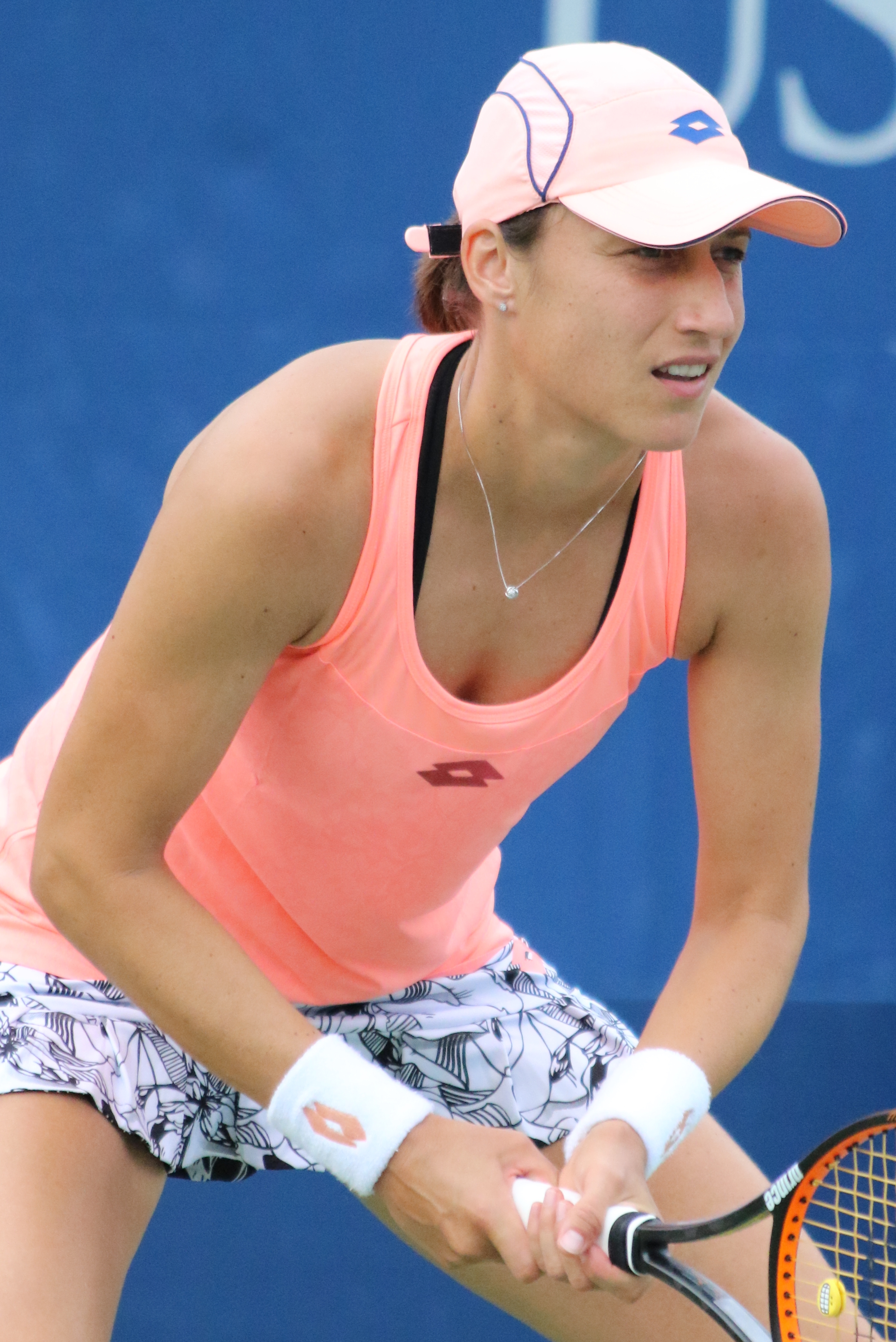
- Srebotnik at the 2016 US Open
- Country (sports): Slovenia
- Residence: Dubai, United Arab Emirates
- Born: 12 March 1981 (age 45) Slovenj Gradec, Yugoslavia (now Slovenia)
- Height: 1.80 m (5 ft 11 in)
- Turned pro: 1999
- Retired: 2022 (last match in 2020)
- Plays: Right-handed (two-handed backhand)
- Prize money: $8,183,702

Singles
- Career record: 377–281
- Career titles: 4
- Highest ranking: No. 20 (7 August 2006)

Grand Slam singles results
- Australian Open: 3R (2003, 2007, 2008)
- French Open: 4R (2002, 2008)
- Wimbledon: 3R (2005, 2006, 2007)
- US Open: 4R (2008)

Doubles
- Career record: 754–421
- Career titles: 39
- Highest ranking: No. 1 (4 July 2011)

Grand Slam doubles results
- Australian Open: SF (2006, 2011, 2014)
- French Open: F (2007, 2010)
- Wimbledon: W (2011)
- US Open: F (2006)

Mixed doubles
- Career titles: 5

Grand Slam mixed doubles results
- Australian Open: W (2011)
- French Open: W (1999, 2006, 2010)
- Wimbledon: F (2008)
- US Open: W (2003)

Team competitions
- Fed Cup: QF (2003), record 33–20

Katarina Srebotnik (born 12 March 1981) is a Slovenian former professional tennis player. She reached a career-high singles ranking of world No. 20, on 7 August 2006. On 4 July 2011, she became the No. 1 of the WTA doubles rankings, holding this ranking for ten weeks.

Srebotnik won four singles titles on the WTA Tour and was ranked inside the top 30 for several years. However, her best results have been in doubles draws, where she won 39 career titles, including a Grand Slam title at the 2011 Wimbledon Championships alongside Květa Peschke. She also won five major titles in mixed doubles, three at the French Open in 1999, 2006 and 2010; one at the US Open in 2003; and another at the Australian Open in 2011.

In September 2021, Srebotnik was recognized by the Guinness World Records as the first and youngest tennis player, male or female, to win her first tournament in all three categories, singles, doubles and mixed doubles. Srebotnik won her debut in singles (1999 Oeiras); in doubles (1998 Makarska, with Tina Križan); and in mixed doubles (1999 Roland Garros, with Piet Norval).

== Career ==
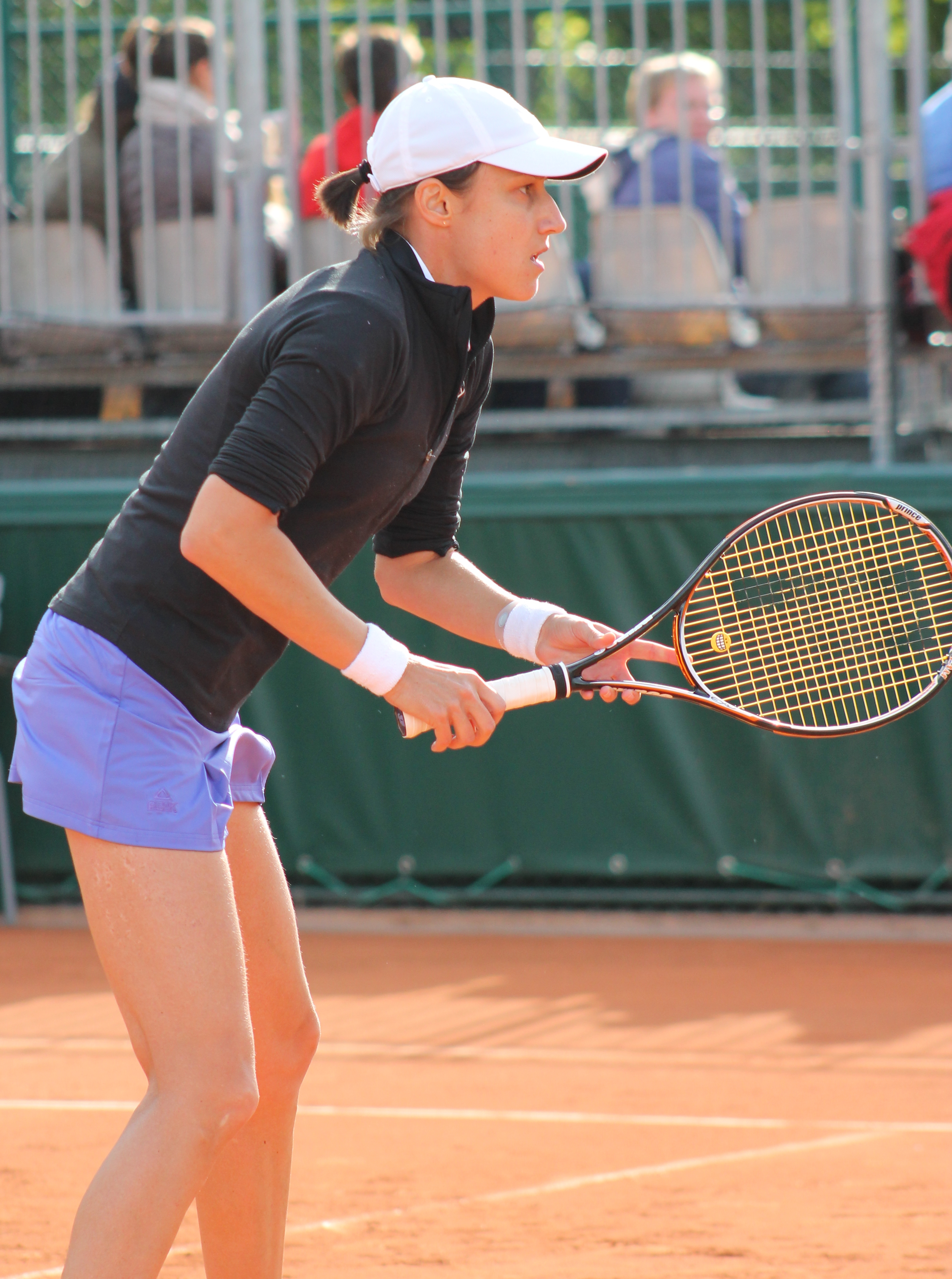
Srebotnik, 2013

As a junior, she won the 1998 Wimbledon singles title and was runner-up at the US Open. Srebotnik was ranked No. 2 in the junior rankings in 1997 and 1998. She was mentored by Gabriela Sabatini.

=== 1995–1999: WTA Tour debut and historic Guinness world record ===
Srebotnik made her debut on the ITF Women's Circuit in 1995, winning the singles tournaments in Ismailia in 1996, Zadar in 1997 and Šibenik in 1998.

In 1998, Srebotnik won the doubles title on her WTA Tour debut at the Makarska Open (with Tina Križan), and later that year reached the doubles final at the Austrian Open, also with Križan.

In 1999, her win at the ITF tournament in Dubai gave her direct entry into her first tour-level singles event in Estoril, where she became the fourth player to win on her tour debut, defeating Rita Kuti Kis in the final. She broke into the top 100 on April 12, 1999 at No. 88.

In May 1999, Srebotnik played in her first Grand Slam singles main draw at Roland Garros, losing to Arantxa Sánchez Vicario in the second round. She won her first Grand Slam title in the mixed doubles with Piet Norval, becoming the first woman ever to win her first tour event in singles, doubles and mixed doubles. Only Mirjana Lučić had previously won on debut in both singles and doubles.

=== 2000–2004 ===
Srebotnik reached her first Tier-I semifinal in Tokyo at the Pan Pacific Open, which she lost to Sandrine Testud. On 7 February 2000, Srebotnik broke into the top 50 at No. 49. She won her fourth career doubles title at Estoril (with Tina Križan).

Srebotnik and Križan won their only doubles title of 2001 at Hawaii. They reached their biggest doubles final of their career in Toronto at the Canadian Open by defeating Martina Navratilova and Arantxa Sánchez Vicario in the semifinals, and they were doubles finalists at Estoril. They qualified for their debut doubles season-ending championships. Srebotnik reached a doubles ranking of No. 19 on 8 October.

In 2002, Srebotnik reached the finals at Bogotá (losing to Fabiola Zuluaga) and Acapulco (defeating Paola Suárez) in the final. She reached the fourth round at Roland Garros, which is her career-best Grand Slam performance. Srebotnik later achieved her then-best win at Los Angeles by defeating world No. 6, Kim Clijsters. She reached the semifinals in Luxembourg. She achieved her second appearance at the doubles season-ending championships with Križan.

2003 saw Srebotnik reaching her fourth tour final at Palermo. She won the Bogotá doubles title with Asa Svensson, and reached her second Tier I quarterfinals in Toronto at the Canadian Open. She won her second Grand Slam mixed-doubles title at the US Open, this time with Bob Bryan.

Her 2004 season was highlighted by reaching the semifinals at Palermo, and the quarterfinals at Strasbourg and Forest Hills.

Srebotnik won her seventh doubles title in Tokyo at the Japan Open (with Shinobu Asagoe).

=== 2005 ===
Her best season to date was highlighted by two singles and four doubles titles as well as a career-best victory over Amélie Mauresmo.

Srebotnik captured her third and fourth career WTA Tour singles titles at Auckland (defeating Shinobu Asagoe in the final, and she teamed with Asagoe for the doubles title) and in Stockholm (defeating world No. 14 Anastasia Myskina in the final and teaming with Émilie Loit for the doubles title).

She was the only player in 2005 to sweep singles and doubles titles twice. She also finished runner-up at Portorož, losing to Klára Zakopalová (now Koukalová) in three sets in the final. She also became runner-up in doubles with Jelena Kostanić.

Srebotnik reached the quarterfinals five times: at Tier II at Antwerp (lost to Anastasia Myskina), Tier I Charleston (losing to Elena Dementieva in three sets), Budapest (losing to Laura Pous Tió in a third set tie-break), Tier I Zurich (losing to Ana Ivanovic), and Hasselt (losing to Dinara Safina in a third set tie-break).

Her best finish in a major was a third-round loss at Wimbledon to Maria Sharapova.

A new career-high singles ranking of No. 28 came on 7 November.

In addition to Auckland and Stockholm, Srebotnik won doubles titles at Budapest and Hasselt (both with Émilie Loit). She reached the US Open mixed-doubles final (with Nenad Zimonjić, losing to Daniela Hantuchová and Mahesh Bhupathi).

=== 2006 ===
Srebotnik opened the 2006 season with an early exit at the Auckland Open. Two weeks later at the Australian Open, with partner Shinobu Asagoe, she made it to the semifinals in doubles, losing to Yan Zi and Zheng Jie. She won doubles titles in Antwerp (with Dinara Safina) and Amelia Island (with Shinobu Asagoe). At the French Open, she won the mixed doubles championship with Nenad Zimonjić.

At the US Open, she reached the doubles final partnering Dinara Safina. In Stuttgart, she reached the semifinals in doubles with Dinara Safina. At the Zurich Open, Srebotnik reached the semifinals of a Tier I tournament for the first time in six years (Pan Pacific Open, Japan). Also, Srebotnik and Liezel Huber reached the doubles final. In her final event of the season at the Linz Open, Srebotnik reached the doubles final with Corina Morariu.

=== 2008 ===
At the French Open, Srebotnik caused an upset when she defeated Serena Williams, whom she had never beaten in four previous attempts, in the third round. At the US Open in the same year, she upset former champion Svetlana Kuznetsova in the third round. On both occasions, she lost to Patty Schnyder in the next round.

=== 2010 ===
In that year, Srebotnik teamed with Květa Peschke, and won the WTA tournaments of Indian Wells (defeating Nadia Petrova and Sam Stosur in the final) and New Haven (defeating Bethanie Mattek-Sands and Meghann Shaughnessy), and reached the final of the WTA Championships in Doha.

Srebotnik had an excellent doubles outing at the French Open. In the ladies' doubles, she and Peschke defeated the second seeds Nuria Llagostera Vives and María José Martínez Sánchez in the semifinals, but lost to Serena and Venus Williams in the final. She also partnered with Nenad Zimonjić to win the mixed doubles title with a thrilling tiebreak win against Yaroslava Shvedova and Julian Knowle.

Srebotnik and Peschke reached the final at the Rogers Cup. It was the second time this year that Srebotnik and Peschke reached a final of a Premier-5 tournament after Dubai in February.

At the end of the 2010 season, Srebotnik announced that she would focus on doubles for the remainder of her career.

=== 2022: Retirement ===
Although she played her last match at Roland Garos in 2020, she was officially honored for her career in Portorož in September 2022.

== Grand Slam finals ==
=== Doubles: 5 (1 title, 4 runner-ups) ===
Result	Year	Championship	Surface	Partner	Opponents	Score
Loss	2006	US Open	Hard	(Russia) Dinara Safina	(France) Nathalie Dechy (Russia) Vera Zvonareva	6–7, 5–7
Loss	2007	French Open	Clay	(Japan) Ai Sugiyama	(Australia) Alicia Molik (Italy) Mara Santangelo	6–7, 4–6
Loss	2007	Wimbledon	Grass	(Japan) Ai Sugiyama	(Zimbabwe) Cara Black (South Africa) Liezel Huber	6–3, 3–6, 2–6
Loss	2010	French Open (2)	Clay	(Czech Republic) Květa Peschke	(United States) Serena Williams (United States) Venus Williams	2–6, 3–6
Win	2011	Wimbledon	Grass	(Czech Republic) Květa Peschke	(Germany) Sabine Lisicki (Australia) Samantha Stosur	6–3, 6–1

=== Mixed doubles: 11 (5 titles, 6 runner-ups) ===
Result	Year	Championship	Surface	Partner	Opponents	Score
Win	1999	French Open	Clay	(South Africa) Piet Norval	(Latvia) Larisa Neiland (United States) Rick Leach	6–3, 3–6, 6–3
Loss	2002	US Open	Hard	(United States) Bob Bryan	(United States) Lisa Raymond (United States) Mike Bryan	6–7, 6–7
Win	2003	US Open	Hard	(United States) Bob Bryan	(Russia) Lina Krasnoroutskaya (Canada) Daniel Nestor	5–7, 7–5, 7–6^{(7–5)}
Loss	2005	US Open	Hard	(Serbia and Montenegro) Nenad Zimonjić	(Slovakia) Daniela Hantuchová (India) Mahesh Bhupathi	4–6, 2–6
Win	2006	French Open (2)	Clay	(Serbia) Nenad Zimonjić	(Russia) Elena Likhovtseva (Canada) Daniel Nestor	6–3, 6–4
Loss	2007	French Open	Clay	(Serbia) Nenad Zimonjić	(France) Nathalie Dechy (Israel) Andy Ram	5–7, 3–6
Loss	2008	French Open	Clay	(Serbia) Nenad Zimonjić	(Belarus) Victoria Azarenka (United States) Bob Bryan	2–6, 6–7^{(4–7)}
Loss	2008	Wimbledon	Grass	(United States) Mike Bryan	(Australia) Samantha Stosur (United States) Bob Bryan	5–7, 4–6
Win	2010	French Open (3)	Clay	(Serbia) Nenad Zimonjić	(Kazakhstan) Yaroslava Shvedova (Austria) Julian Knowle	4–6, 7–6^{(7–5)}, [11–9]
Win	2011	Australian Open	Hard	(Canada) Daniel Nestor	(Chinese Taipei) Chan Yung-jan (Australia) Paul Hanley	6–3, 3–6, [10–7]
Loss	2011	French Open	Clay	(Serbia) Nenad Zimonjić	(Australia) Casey Dellacqua (United States) Scott Lipsky	6–7^{(6–8)}, 6–4, [7–10]

== WTA Tour finals ==
=== Singles: 10 (4 titles, 6 runner-ups) ===
Legend
Grand Slam tournaments
Tier I / Premier M & Premier 5
Tier II / Premier
Tier III, IV & V / International (4–6)

Result	W-L	Date	Tournament	Surface	Opponent	Score
Win	1–0	Apr 1999	Portugal Open, Estoril	Clay	(Hungary) Rita Kuti-Kis	6–3, 6–1
Loss	1–1	Feb 2002	Copa Colsanitas, Bogotá	Clay	(Colombia) Fabiola Zuluaga	1–6, 4–6
Win	2–1	Mar 2002	Abierto Mexicano, Acapulco	Clay	(Argentina) Paola Suárez	6–7^{(1–7)}, 6–4, 6–2
Loss	2–2	Jul 2003	Palermo Ladies Open, Italy	Clay	(Russia) Dinara Safina	3–6, 4–6
Win	3–2	Jan 2005	Auckland Open, New Zealand	Hard	(Japan) Shinobu Asagoe	5–7, 7–5, 6–4
Win	4–2	Aug 2005	Nordic Light Open, Stockholm	Hard	(Russia) Anastasia Myskina	7–5, 6–2
Loss	4–3	Sep 2005	Slovenia Open, Portorož	Hard	(Czech Republic) Klára Koukalová	2–6, 6–4, 3–6
Loss	4–4	Jul 2006	Cincinnati Open, US	Hard	(Russia) Vera Zvonareva	2–6, 4–6
Loss	4–5	Sep 2007	Slovenia Open, Portorož	Hard	(France) Tatiana Golovin	6–2, 4–6, 4–6
Loss	4–6	May 2008	Internationaux de Strasbourg, France	Clay	(Spain) Anabel Medina Garrigues	6–4, 6–7^{(4–7)}, 0–6

=== Doubles: 82 (39 titles, 43 runner-ups) ===
Legend (pre/post 2009)
Grand Slam tournaments (1–4)
Tour Championships (0–3)
Tier I / Premier M & Premier 5 (9–12)
Tier II / Premier (14–12)
Tier III, IV & V / International (15–12)

Result	No.	Date	Tournament	Surface	Partner	Opponents	Score
Win	1.	Apr 1998	Makarska Open, Croatia	Clay	(Slovenia) Tina Križan	(Austria) Karin Kschwendt (Russia) Evgenia Kulikovskaya	7–6^{(7–3)}, 6–1
Loss	1.	Jul 1998	Austrian Open	Clay	(Slovenia) Tina Križan	(Argentina) Laura Montalvo (Argentina) Paola Suárez	1–6, 2–6
Win	2.	May 1999	Belgian Open, Antwerp	Clay	(Italy) Laura Golarsa	(Australia) Louise Pleming (United States) Meghann Shaughnessy	6–4, 6–2
Win	3.	Jul 1999	Palermo Ladies Open, Italy	Clay	(Slovenia) Tina Križan	(Sweden) Åsa Carlsson (Canada) Sonya Jeyaseelan	4–6, 6–3, 6–0
Loss	2.	Sep 1999	Luxembourg Open	Hard	(Slovenia) Tina Križan	(Romania) Irina Spîrlea (Netherlands) Caroline Vis	1–6, 2–6
Win	4.	Apr 2000	Estoril Open, Portugal	Clay	(Slovenia) Tina Križan	(Netherlands) Amanda Hopmans (Spain) Cristina Torrens Valero	6–0, 7–6^{(11–9)}
Loss	3.	May 2000	Bol Ladies Open, Croatia	Clay	(Slovenia) Tina Križan	(France) Julie Halard-Decugis (United States) Corina Morariu	2–6, 2–6
Loss	4.	Oct 2000	Japan Open, Tokyo	Hard	(Slovenia) Tina Križan	(France) Julie Halard-Decugis (United States) Corina Morariu	1–6, 2–6
Loss	5.	Nov 2000	Pattaya Open, Thailand	Hard	(Slovenia) Tina Križan	(Indonesia) Yayuk Basuki (Netherlands) Caroline Vis	3–6, 3–6
Loss	6.	Apr 2001	Estoril Open, Portugal	Clay	(Slovenia) Tina Križan	(Czech Republic) Květa Hrdličková (Germany) Barbara Rittner	6–3, 5–7, 1–6
Loss	7.	Aug 2001	Canadian Open, Toronto	Hard	(Slovenia) Tina Križan	(United States) Kimberly Po-Messerli (Australia) Nicole Pratt	3–6, 1–6
Win	5.	Sep 2001	Waikoloa Championships, Hawaii	Hard	(Slovenia) Tina Križan	(Belgium) Els Callens (Australia) Nicole Pratt	6–2, 6–3
Loss	8.	Feb 2002	Copa Colsanitas, Bogotá	Clay	(Slovenia) Tina Križan	(Spain) Virginia Ruano Pascual (Argentina) Paola Suárez	2–6, 1–6
Loss	9.	Mar 2002	Mexican Open, Acapulco	Clay	(Slovenia) Tina Križan	(Spain) Virginia Ruano Pascual (Argentina) Paola Suárez	5–7, 1–6
Win	6.	Feb 2003	Copa Colsanitas, Bogotá	Clay	(Sweden) Åsa Svensson	(Slovenia) Tina Križan (Ukraine) Tatiana Perebiynis	6–2, 6–1
Loss	10.	Apr 2004	Morocco Open, Casablanca	Clay	(Belgium) Els Callens	(France) Marion Bartoli (France) Émilie Loit	4–6, 2–6
Loss	11.	May 2004	Internationaux de Strasbourg	Clay	(Slovenia) Tina Križan	(Australia) Lisa McShea (Venezuela) Milagros Sequera	4–6, 1–6
Win	7.	Oct 2004	Japan Open, Tokyo	Hard	(Japan) Shinobu Asagoe	(United States) Jennifer Hopkins (United States) Mashona Washington	6–1, 6–4
Win	8.	Jan 2005	Auckland Open	Hard	(Japan) Shinobu Asagoe	(New Zealand) Leanne Baker (Italy) Francesca Lubiani	6–3, 6–3
Win	9.	Jul 2005	Budapest Grand Prix, Hungary	Clay	(France) Émilie Loit	(Spain) Lourdes Domínguez Lino (Spain) Marta Marrero	6–1, 3–6, 6–2
Win	10.	Aug 2005	Nordic Light Open, Stockholm	Hard	(France) Émilie Loit	(Czech Republic) Eva Birnerová (Italy) Mara Santangelo	6–4, 6–3
Loss	12.	Sep 2005	Slovenia Open, Portorož	Hard	(Croatia) Jelena Kostanić	(Spain) Anabel Medina Garrigues (Italy) Roberta Vinci	4–6, 7–5, 2–6
Win	11.	Oct 2005	Gaz de France Stars, Hasselt	Hard (i)	(France) Émilie Loit	(Netherlands) Michaëlla Krajicek (Hungary) Ágnes Szávay	6–3, 6–4
Win	12.	Feb 2006	Diamond Games Antwerp, Belgium	Hard (i)	(Russia) Dinara Safina	(France) Stéphanie Foretz (Netherlands) Michaëlla Krajicek	6–1, 6–1
Win	13.	Apr 2006	Amelia Island Championships, US	Clay	(Japan) Shinobu Asagoe	(South Africa) Liezel Huber (India) Sania Mirza	6–2, 6–4
Loss	13.	May 2006	Warsaw Open, Poland	Clay	(Spain) Anabel Medina Garrigues	(Russia) Elena Likhovtseva (Russia) Anastasia Myskina	3–6, 4–6
Loss	14.	Sep 2006	US Open, New York	Hard	(Russia) Dinara Safina	(France) Nathalie Dechy (Russia) Vera Zvonareva	6–7, 5–7
Loss	15.	Oct 2006	Zurich Open, Switzerland	Hard	(South Africa) Liezel Huber	(Zimbabwe) Cara Black (Australia) Rennae Stubbs	5–7, 5–7
Loss	16.	Oct 2006	Generali Ladies Linz, Austria	Hard	(United States) Corina Morariu	(United States) Lisa Raymond (Australia) Samantha Stosur	3–6, 0–6
Win	14.	Jan 2007	Brisbane International, Adelaide	Hard	(Russia) Dinara Safina	(Czech Republic) Iveta Benešová (Russia) Galina Voskoboeva	6–3, 6–4
Win	15.	Apr 2007	Amelia Island Championships, US	Clay	(Italy) Mara Santangelo	(Spain) Anabel Medina Garrigues (Spain) Virginia Ruano Pascual	6–3, 7–6^{(7–4)}
Loss	17.	May 2007	French Open, Paris	Clay	(Japan) Ai Sugiyama	(Australia) Alicia Molik (Italy) Mara Santangelo	6–7, 4–6
Loss	18.	Jun 2007	Wimbledon, UK	Grass	(Japan) Ai Sugiyama	(Zimbabwe) Cara Black (United States) Liezel Huber	6–3, 3–6, 2–6
Win	16.	Aug 2007	Canada Masters, Toronto	Hard	(Japan) Ai Sugiyama	(Zimbabwe) Cara Black (United States) Liezel Huber	6–4, 2–6, [10–5]
Loss	19.	Oct 2007	Generali Ladies Linz	Hard	(Japan) Ai Sugiyama	(Zimbabwe) Cara Black (United States) Liezel Huber	2–6, 6–3, [8–10]
Loss	20.	Nov 2007	WTA Tour Championships, Madrid	Hard	(Japan) Ai Sugiyama	(Zimbabwe) Cara Black (United States) Liezel Huber	7–5, 3–6, [8–10]
Win	17.	Apr 2008	Miami Open, US	Hard	(Japan) Ai Sugiyama	(Zimbabwe) Cara Black (United States) Liezel Huber	7–5, 4–6, [10–3]
Win	18.	Apr 2008	Family Circle Cup, Charleston	Clay	(Japan) Ai Sugiyama	(Romania) Edina Gallovits (Belarus) Olga Govortsova	6–2, 6–2
Win	19.	Oct 2008	Kremlin Cup, Moscow	Carpet (i)	(Russia) Nadia Petrova	(Zimbabwe) Cara Black (United States) Liezel Huber	6–4, 6–4
Win	20.	Oct 2008	Generali Ladies Linz	Hard (i)	(Japan) Ai Sugiyama	(Zimbabwe) Cara Black (United States) Liezel Huber	6–4, 7–5
Win	21.	Oct 2009	Generali Ladies Linz	Hard	(Germany) Anna-Lena Grönefeld	(Poland) Klaudia Jans (Poland) Alicja Rosolska	6–1, 6–4
Loss	21.	Feb 2010	Dubai Tennis Championships	Hard	(Czech Republic) Květa Peschke	(Spain) Nuria Llagostera Vives (Spain) María José Martínez Sánchez	6–7^{(5–7)}, 4–6
Win	22.	Mar 2010	Indian Wells Open	Hard	(Czech Republic) Květa Peschke	(Russia) Nadia Petrova (Australia) Samantha Stosur	6–4, 2–6, [10–5]
Loss	22.	Apr 2010	Porsche Tennis Grand Prix, Stuttgart	Clay (i)	(Czech Republic) Květa Peschke	(Argentina) Gisela Dulko (Italy) Flavia Pennetta	6–3, 6–7, [5–10]
Loss	23.	May 2010	French Open, Paris	Clay	(Czech Republic) Květa Peschke	(United States) Serena Williams (United States) Venus Williams	2–6, 3–6
Loss	24.	Jun 2010	Eastbourne International, UK	Grass	(Czech Republic) Květa Peschke	(United States) Lisa Raymond (Australia) Rennae Stubbs	6–2, 2–6, [11–13]
Loss	25.	Aug 2010	Canadian Open, Montreal	Hard	(Czech Republic) Květa Peschke	(Argentina) Gisela Dulko (Italy) Flavia Pennetta	5–7, 6–3, [10–12]
Win	23.	Aug 2010	Pilot Pen Tennis, New Haven	Hard	(Czech Republic) Květa Peschke	(United States) Bethanie Mattek-Sands (United States) Meghann Shaughnessy	7–5, 6–0
Loss	26.	Oct 2010	Generali Ladies Linz	Hard (i)	(Czech Republic) Květa Peschke	(Czech Republic) Renata Voráčová (Czech Republic) Barbora Záhlavová-Strýcová	5–7, 6–7^{(6–8)}
Loss	27.	Oct 2010	Tour Championships, Doha	Hard	(Czech Republic) Květa Peschke	(Argentina) Gisela Dulko (Italy) Flavia Pennetta	5–7, 4–6
Win	24.	Jan 2011	Auckland Open	Hard	(Czech Republic) Květa Peschke	(Sweden) Sofia Arvidsson (New Zealand) Marina Erakovic	6–3, 6–0
Loss	28.	Jan 2011	Sydney International	Hard	(Czech Republic) Květa Peschke	(Czech Republic) Iveta Benešová (Czech Republic) Barbora Záhlavová-Strýcová	6–4, 4–6, [7–10]
Loss	29.	Feb 2011	Dubai Championships	Hard	(Czech Republic) Květa Peschke	(United States) Liezel Huber (Spain) María José Martínez Sánchez	6–7^{(5–7)}, 3–6
Win	25.	Feb 2011	Qatar Ladies Open, Doha	Hard	(Czech Republic) Květa Peschke	(United States) Liezel Huber (Russia) Nadia Petrova	7–5, 6–7^{(2–7)}, [10–8]
Loss	30.	May 2011	Madrid Open	Clay	(Czech Republic) Květa Peschke	(Belarus) Victoria Azarenka (Russia) Maria Kirilenko	4–6, 3–6
Win	26.	Jun 2011	Eastbourne International, UK	Grass	(Czech Republic) Květa Peschke	(United States) Liezel Huber (United States) Lisa Raymond	6–3, 6–0
Win	27.	Jun 2011	Wimbledon, London	Grass	(Czech Republic) Květa Peschke	(Germany) Sabine Lisicki (Australia) Samantha Stosur	6–3, 6–1
Win	28.	Aug 2011	Carlsbad Open, US	Hard	(Czech Republic) Květa Peschke	(United States) Raquel Kops-Jones (United States) Abigail Spears	6–0, 6–2
Win	29.	Oct 2011	China Open, Beijing	Hard	(Czech Republic) Květa Peschke	(Argentina) Gisela Dulko (Italy) Flavia Pennetta	6–3, 6–4
Loss	31.	Oct 2011	Tour Championships, Istanbul	Hard (i)	(Czech Republic) Květa Peschke	(United States) Liezel Huber (United States) Lisa Raymond	4–6, 4–6
Win	30.	Jan 2012	Sydney International	Hard	(Czech Republic) Květa Peschke	(United States) Liezel Huber (United States) Lisa Raymond	6–1, 4–6, [13–11]
Loss	32.	Aug 2012	Canadian Open, Montreal	Hard	(Russia) Nadia Petrova	(Poland) Klaudia Jans-Ignacik (France) Kristina Mladenovic	5–7, 6–2, [7–10]
Loss	33.	Aug 2012	Western & Southern Open, Cincinnati	Hard	(China) Zheng Jie	(Czech Republic) Andrea Hlaváčková (Czech Republic) Lucie Hradecká	1–6, 3–6
Win	31.	Jan 2013	Sydney International	Hard	(Russia) Nadia Petrova	(Italy) Sara Errani (Italy) Roberta Vinci	6–3, 6–4
Loss	34.	Feb 2013	Qatar Open, Doha	Hard	(Russia) Nadia Petrova	(Italy) Sara Errani (Italy) Roberta Vinci	6–2, 3–6, [6–10]
Loss	35.	Feb 2013	Dubai Championships, UAE	Hard	(Russia) Nadia Petrova	(United States) Bethanie Mattek-Sands (India) Sania Mirza	4–6, 6–2, [7–10]
Loss	36.	Mar 2013	Indian Wells Open	Hard	(Russia) Nadia Petrova	(Russia) Ekaterina Makarova (Russia) Elena Vesnina	0–6, 7–5, [6–10]
Win	32.	Mar 2013	Miami Open	Hard	(Russia) Nadia Petrova	(United States) Lisa Raymond (United Kingdom) Laura Robson	6–1, 7–6^{(7–2)}
Win	33.	Jun 2013	Eastbourne International	Grass	(Russia) Nadia Petrova	(Romania) Monica Niculescu (Czech Republic) Klára Zakopalová	6–3, 6–3
Win	34.	Aug 2013	Canadian Open, Toronto	Hard	(Serbia) Jelena Janković	(Germany) Anna-Lena Grönefeld (Czech Republic) Květa Peschke	5–7, 6–2, [10–6]
Loss	37.	Aug 2013	New Haven Open at Yale	Hard	(Spain) Anabel Medina Garrigues	(India) Sania Mirza (China) Zheng Jie	3–6, 4–6
Loss	38.	Feb 2014	Qatar Open, Doha	Hard	(Czech Republic) Květa Peschke	(Chinese Taipei) Hsieh Su-wei (China) Peng Shuai	4–6, 0–6
Win	35.	May 2014	Italian Open, Rome	Clay	(Czech Republic) Květa Peschke	(Italy) Sara Errani (Italy) Roberta Vinci	4–0 ret.
Loss	39.	Jan 2015	Brisbane International	Hard	(France) Caroline Garcia	(Switzerland) Martina Hingis (Germany) Sabine Lisicki	2–6, 5–7
Loss	40.	Apr 2015	Porsche Grand Prix, Stuttgart	Clay (i)	(France) Caroline Garcia	(United States) Bethanie Mattek-Sands (Czech Republic) Lucie Šafářová	4–6, 3–6
Win	36.	Jun 2015	Eastbourne International	Grass	(France) Caroline Garcia	(Chinese Taipei) Chan Yung-jan (China) Zheng Jie	7–6^{(7–5)}, 6–2
Loss	41.	Aug 2015	Canadian Open, Toronto	Hard	(France) Caroline Garcia	(United States) Bethanie Mattek-Sands (Czech Republic) Lucie Šafářová	1–6, 2–6
Win	37.	Feb 2017	Qatar Open, Doha	Hard	(United States) Abigail Spears	(Ukraine) Olga Savchuk (Kazakhstan) Yaroslava Shvedova	6–3, 7–6^{(9–7)}
Loss	42.	Apr 2017	Porsche Grand Prix, Stuttgart	Clay (i)	(United States) Abigail Spears	(United States) Raquel Atawo (Latvia) Jeļena Ostapenko	4–6, 4–6
Loss	43.	Feb 2018	St. Petersburg Ladies' Trophy, Russia	Hard (i)	(Russia) Alla Kudryavtseva	(Switzerland) Timea Bacsinszky (Russia) Vera Zvonareva	6–2, 1–6, [3–10]
Win	38.	Apr 2018	Charleston Open, US	Clay	(Russia) Alla Kudryavtseva	(Slovenia) Andreja Klepač (Spain) María José Martínez Sánchez	6–3, 6–3
Win	39.	May 2018	Nuremberg Cup, Germany	Clay	(Netherlands) Demi Schuurs	(Belgium) Kirsten Flipkens (Sweden) Johanna Larsson	3–6, 6–3, [10–7]

== ITF Circuit finals ==
=== Singles: 9 (6–3) ===
$100,000 tournaments
$75,000 tournaments
$50,000 tournaments
$25,000 tournaments
$10,000 tournaments

Result	No.	Date	Tournament	Surface	Opponent	Score
Win	1.	24 November 1996	Ismailia, Egypt	Clay	(Austria) Nina Schwarz	7–5, 7–6^{(7–3)}
Loss	1.	21 September 1997	Biograd na Moru, Croatia	Clay	(Slovakia) Ľudmila Cervanová	4–6, 2–6
Win	2.	29 September 1997	Zadar, Croatia	Clay	(Croatia) Jelena Kostanić Tošić	4–6, 6–4, 6–4
Loss	2.	2 November 1997	Ramat HaSharon, Israel	Hard	(Italy) Adriana Serra Zanetti	4–6, 2–6
Loss	3.	12 April 1998	Dubrovnik, Croatia	Clay	(Russia) Nadia Petrova	4–6, 5–7
Win	3.	21 September 1998	Šibenik, Croatia	Clay	(Hungary) Eszter Molnár	6–1, 6–2
Win	4.	1 March 1999	Dubai, United Arab Emirates	Hard	(Luxembourg) Anne Kremer	6–1, 6–1
Win	5.	9 May 1999	Bratislava, Slovakia	Clay	(Netherlands) Kristie Boogert	6–3, 6–1
Win	6.	30 July 2001	Lexington Challenger, United States	Hard	(Germany) Sabine Klaschka	6–4, 7–5

=== Doubles: 22 (19–3) ===
Result	No.	Date	Tournament	Surface	Partner	Opponents	Score
Loss	1.	17 November 1996	Cairo, Egypt	Hard	(South Africa) Jessica Steck	(Netherlands) Maaike Koutstaal (Netherlands) Andrea van den Hurk	w/o
Win	1.	24 November 1996	Ismailia, Egypt	Clay	(Bulgaria) Teodora Nedeva	(Israel) Shiri Burstein (Netherlands) Debby Haak	6–4, 6–4
Loss	2.	3 August 1997	Lexington, United States	Hard	(Japan) Kaoru Shibata	(United States) Elly Hakami (Australia) Danielle Jones	2–6, 5–7
Win	2.	21 April 1997	Biograd na Moru, Croatia	Clay	(Croatia) Jelena Kostanić Tošić	(Italy) Katia Altilia (Denmark) Charlotte Aagaard	6–4, 6–2
Win	3.	29 April 1997	Zadar, Croatia	Clay	(Croatia) Jelena Kostanić Tošić	(Netherlands) Yvette Basting (Netherlands) Susanne Trik	7–5, 7–5
Loss	3.	27 October 1997	Ramat Hasharon, Israel	Hard	(Slovenia) Petra Rampre	(Germany) Kirstin Freye (Israel) Hila Rosen	1–6, 1–6
Win	4.	15 February 1998	Rogaška Slatina, Slovenia	Hard (i)	(Slovenia) Tina Križan	(Slovenia) Tina Pisnik (Germany) Miriam Schnitzer	6–0, 6–3
Win	5.	23 March 1998	Makarska, Croatia	Clay	(Croatia) Jelena Kostanić Tošić	(Slovakia) Ľudmila Cervanová (Slovakia) Zuzana Váleková	6–3, 6–1
Win	6.	5 April 1998	Hvar, Croatia	Clay	(Croatia) Jelena Kostanić Tošić	(Czech Republic) Helena Vildová (Bulgaria) Antoaneta Pandjerova	7–5, 6–3
Win	7.	10 May 1998	Cardiff, United Kingdom	Clay	(South Africa) Liezel Horn	(Czech Republic) Petra Langrová (Belgium) Nancy Feber	6–4, 6–3
Win	8.	17 May 1998	Porto, Portugal	Clay	(Belgium) Nancy Feber	(South Africa) Surina De Beer (United States) Rebecca Jensen	5–7, 6–1, 6–4
Win	9.	20 September 1998	Otočec, Slovenia	Clay	(Germany) Jasmin Wöhr	(Hungary) Nóra Köves (Serbia) Dragana Zarić	6–2, 6–3
Win	10.	27 September 1998	Šibenik, Croatia	Hard (i)	(Croatia) Marijana Kovačević	(Czech Republic) Blanka Kumbárová (Czech Republic) Olga Vymetálková	6–3, 6–1
Win	11.	22 November 1998	Buenos Aires, Argentina	Clay	(Netherlands) Seda Noorlander	(Spain) Eva Bes (Argentina) María Fernanda Landa	7–6^{(7–5)}, 6–3
Win	12.	23 November 1998	Lima, Peru	Clay	(Slovakia) Zuzana Váleková	(Italy) Alice Canepa (Spain) Conchita Martínez Granados	6–7^{(4–7)}, 7–5, 6–4
Win	13.	30 November 1998	Bogotá, Colombia	Clay	(Slovakia) Zuzana Váleková	(Colombia) Mariana Mesa (Colombia) Fabiola Zuluaga	6–3, 6–4
Win	14.	30 November 1998	Cali, Colombia	Clay	(Slovakia) Zuzana Váleková	(Argentina) Laura Montalvo (Spain) Alicia Ortuño	2–6, 6–3, 6–2
Win	15.	11 January 1999	Miami, United States	Hard	(Slovakia) Zuzana Váleková	(Czech Republic) Olga Vymetálková (Czech Republic) Gabriela Chmelinová	4–6, 6–4, 7–5
Win	16.	18 January 1999	Boca Raton, United States	Hard	(Slovakia) Zuzana Váleková	(United States) Dawn Buth (United States) Rebecca Jensen	4–6, 6–4, 6–1
Win	17.	25 January 1999	Clearwater, United States	Hard	(Slovakia) Zuzana Váleková	(United States) Karin Miller (United States) Jean Okada	6–2, 6–0
Win	18.	8 February 1999	Rogaška Slatina, Slovenia	Carpet (i)	(Slovenia) Tina Križan	(Czech Republic) Eva Martincová (Bulgaria) Svetlana Krivencheva	7–5, 6–2
Win	19.	9 May 1999	Bratislava, Slovakia	Clay	(Slovenia) Tina Križan	(Czech Republic) Lenka Němečková (Slovakia) Radka Zrubáková	6–1, 6–3

== Performance timelines ==
Key
W	F	SF	QF	#R	RR	Q#	P#	DNQ	A	Z#	PO	G	S	B	NMS	NTI	P	NH

(W) winner; (F) finalist; (SF) semifinalist; (QF) quarterfinalist; (#R) rounds 4, 3, 2, 1; (RR) round-robin stage; (Q#) qualification round; (P#) preliminary round; (DNQ) did not qualify; (A) absent; (Z#) Davis/Fed Cup Zonal Group (with number indication) or (PO) play-off; (G) gold, (S) silver or (B) bronze Olympic/Paralympic medal; (NMS) not a Masters tournament; (NTI) not a Tier I tournament; (P) postponed; (NH) not held; (SR) strike rate (events won / competed); (W–L) win–loss record.
To avoid confusion and double counting, these charts are updated at the conclusion of a tournament or when the player's participation has ended.

=== Singles ===
Tournament	1999	2000	2001	2002	2003	2004	2005	2006	2007	2008	2009	2010	SR	W–L
Grand Slam tournaments
Australian Open	A	1R	Q3	2R	3R	1R	1R	2R	3R	3R	A	A	0 / 8	8–8
French Open	2R	2R	2R	4R	2R	3R	1R	3R	3R	4R	A	1R	0 / 11	16–11
Wimbledon	1R	1R	Q1	1R	2R	2R	3R	3R	3R	1R	A	A	0 / 9	8–9
US Open	1R	1R	2R	2R	2R	2R	2R	3R	2R	4R	1R	A	0 / 11	11–11
Win–loss	1–3	1–4	2–2	5–4	5–4	4–4	3–4	7–4	7–4	8–4	0–1	0–1	0–39	43–39

=== Doubles ===
Tournament	1998	1999	2000	2001	2002	2003	2004	2005	2006	2007	2008	2009	2010	2011	2012	2013	2014	2015	2016	2017	2018	2019	2020	SR	W–L
Grand Slam tournaments
Australian Open	A	A	1R	2R	QF	1R	3R	3R	SF	3R	2R	A	A	SF	2R	3R	SF	3R	2R	3R	3R	QF	1R	0 / 19	36–19
French Open	2R	3R	2R	1R	1R	2R	2R	QF	1R	F	2R	A	F	QF	QF	SF	QF	3R	3R	2R	QF	2R	1R	0 / 22	42–22
Wimbledon	2R	SF	1R	2R	QF	2R	1R	3R	1R	F	2R	A	QF	W	2R	QF	1R	2R	1R	1R	3R	1R	NH	1 / 21	32–20
US Open	1R	2R	2R	QF	1R	3R	2R	3R	F	QF	SF	2R	3R	QF	1R	QF	QF	QF	QF	1R	1R	1R	A	0 / 22	40–22
Win–loss	2–3	7–3	2–4	5–4	6–4	4–4	4–4	9–4	9–4	15–4	7–4	1–1	10–3	16–4	5–4	12–4	10–4	8–4	6–4	3–4	7–4	4–4	0–2	1 / 84	149–83
Year-end championships
Tour Championships	A	A	A	QF	QF	A	A	A	A	F	SF	A	F	F	A	SF	SF	RR	A	A	A	A	NH	0 / 9	5–10
Olympic Games
Summer Olympics	not held		1R	not held			1R	not held			A	not held			2R	not held			A	not held				0 / 3	1–3
Premier Mandatory tournaments
Indian Wells	A	A	1R	2R	2R	1R	A	1R	A	A	A	A	W	1R	A	F	QF	QF	QF	1R	QF	2R	NH	1 / 14	20–13
Miami	A	A	2R	1R	1R	1R	1R	2R	SF	1R	W	A	2R	1R	1R	W	QF	QF	1R	1R	2R	1R	NH	2 / 19	21–17
Madrid	not held											A	1R	F	QF	2R	2R	1R	2R	1R	1R	1R	NH	0 / 10	5–10
Beijing	not held		Tier IV			Tier II						A	QF	W	SF	2R	2R	2R	2R	1R	2R	1R	NH	1 / 10	11–9
Premier 5 tournaments
Dubai	not held			Tier II								A	F	F	Premier			SF	P	QF	P	1R	P	0 / 5	12–5
Doha	not held			Tier III			Tier II				SF	not held		P	A	F	F	P	2R	P	1R	P	1R	0 / 6	9–6
Rome	A	A	A	A	1R	SF	A	A	SF	2R	2R	A	2R	SF	2R	SF	W	SF	QF	QF	QF	1R	A	1 / 15	23–14
Montreal / Toronto	A	2R	A	F	1R	2R	A	A	SF	W	A	A	F	2R	F	W	2R	F	SF	1R	QF	2R	NH	2 / 16	32–14
Cincinnati	not held						Tier III					A	2R	SF	F	QF	2R	2R	1R	1R	1R	1R	A	0 / 10	8–10
Tokyo	A	A	QF	QF	1R	SF	1R	A	1R	A	1R	A	QF	A	QF	QF	Premier							0 / 10	7–10
Wuhan	not held																2R	2R	2R	1R	2R	1R	NH	0 / 6	2–6
Former Tier I
Charleston	A	A	A	A	A	A	A	QF	SF	QF	W	NMS												1 / 4	10–2
Moscow	A	A	A	A	1R	A	A	A	A	A	W	NMS											NH	1 / 2	4–1
Zurich	A	A	A	A	1R	QF	1R	SF	F	QF	NH		NMS				NH	NMS	NH					0 / 6	7–6
San Diego	NMS						A	A	SF	SF	NMS	NH												0 / 2	5–2
Career statistics	1998	1999	2000	2001	2002	2003	2004	2005	2006	2007	2008	2009	2010	2011	2012	2013	2014	2015	2016	2017	2018	2019	2020	Total	
Tournaments played	8	16	24	21	26	21	20	18	20	20	17	4	18	20	20	22	20	22	24	24	26	28	10	449	
Titles	1	2	1	1	0	1	1	4	2	3	4	1	2	6	1	4	1	1	0	1	2	0	0	39	
Finals	2	3	4	3	2	1	3	5	6	7	4	1	8	10	3	8	2	4	0	2	3	0	0	81	
Overall win–loss	11–7	23–14	31–23	30–20	23–26	23–20	21–19	38–14	45–18	45–17	34–13	8–3	41–16	54–14	33–19	54–18	26–19	34–21	27–24	19–23	32–24	14–28	4–10	670-410	
Year-end ranking	77	26	33	20	30	38	49	25	7	4	4	123	6	2	16	6	10	14	28	35	22	58	88		

=== Mixed doubles ===
Tournament	1999	2000	2001	2002	2003	2004	2005	2006	2007	2008	2009	2010	2011	2012	2013	2014	2015	2016	2017	2018	2019	2020	SR	W–L
Australian Open	A	A	1R	QF	1R	1R	2R	1R	A	A	A	A	W	A	2R	QF	QF	QF	1R	A	1R	A	1 / 13	14–12
French Open	W	2R	1R	SF	QF	QF	2R	W	F	F	A	W	F	2R	QF	QF	SF	1R	2R	SF	A	NH	3 / 19	47–16
Wimbledon	3R	1R	3R	QF	A	A	3R	QF	A	F	A	3R	3R	SF	SF	2R	QF	QF	2R	SF	2R	NH	0 / 17	28–16
US Open	1R	1R	1R	F	W	A	F	2R	A	QF	A	2R	2R	1R	2R	QF	1R	1R	A	2R	A	NH	1 / 16	21–15
Win–loss	8–2	0–3	2–4	11–4	7–2	2–2	7–4	8–3	4–1	9–3	0–0	7–2	10–2	4–3	7–4	6–4	7–4	3–4	1–3	7–3	0–2	0–0	5 / 65	110–59

- At the 2002 US Open, Srebotnik and Bob Bryan received a second-round walkover, this is not counted as a win.
- At the 2008 French Open, Srebotnik and Zimonjić received a semifinal walkover, this is not counted as a win.
- At the 2011 Australian Open, Srebotnik and Nestor received a quarterfinal walkover, this is not counted as a win.
- At the 2011 Wimbledon Championships, Srebotnik and Zimonjić withdrew before their third-round match, this is not counted as a loss.
- At the 2016 Wimbledon Championships, Srebotnik and Marcin Matkowski received a second-round walkover, this is not counted as a win.

== Top 10 wins ==
#	Player	Rank	Event	Surface	Rd	Score
2002
1.	(Belgium) Kim Clijsters	No. 6	LA Championships	Hard	2R	6–4, 2–6, 6–4
2005
2.	(France) Amélie Mauresmo	No. 4	Zurich Open	Hard (i)	2R	6–2, 6–0
2006
3.	(Switzerland) Patty Schnyder	No. 8	Cincinnati Open	Hard	SF	4–6, 6–3, 7–6^{(8–6)}
4.	(Russia) Elena Dementieva	No. 7	Zurich Open	Hard (i)	2R	6–1, 6–4
2007
5.	(Russia) Svetlana Kuznetsova	No. 4	Sydney International	Hard	2R	6–2, ret.
2008
6.	(Russia) Anna Chakvetadze	No. 6	Sydney International	Hard	1R	7–5, 6–1
7.	(United States) Serena Williams	No. 5	French Open	Clay	3R	6–4, 6–4
8.	(Russia) Svetlana Kuznetsova	No. 4	US Open	Hard	3R	6–3, 6–7^{(1–7)}, 6–3
9.	(Russia) Elena Dementieva	No. 4	Pan Pacific Open	Hard	QF	6–3, 6–4
10.	(Poland) Agnieszka Radwańska	No. 10	Zurich Open	Hard (i)	2R	2–6, 7–6^{(8–6)}, 6–3

== Records ==
- In 2011, Srebotnik won seven titles (six in doubles, one in mixed doubles), more than any other player on the WTA Tour.

Awards
Preceded by (Argentina) Gisela Dulko & (Italy) Flavia Pennetta	WTA Doubles Team of the Year (with (Czech Republic) Květa Peschke); 2011	Succeeded by (Italy) Sara Errani & (Italy) Roberta Vinci
Preceded by (Argentina) Gisela Dulko & (Italy) Flavia Pennetta	ITF World Champion (with (Czech Republic) Květa Peschke); 2011	Succeeded by (Italy) Sara Errani & (Italy) Roberta Vinci
