= 1999 du Maurier Open – Women's doubles qualifying =

Women's doubles qualifying
- 1999 du Maurier Open

Events
| Singles | men | women |
| Doubles | men | women |
| ← 1998 · | du Maurier Open | · 2000 → |

The 1999 Canadian Open was a WTA tennis tournament, played on outdoor hard courts.

== Players ==
=== Seeds ===
1. (United States) Lilia Osterloh / (Austria) Barbara Schwartz (qualifying competition)
2. (Spain) Cristina Torrens Valero / (Germany) Marlene Weingärtner (first round)

=== Qualifiers ===
1. (Spain) Gala León García / (Spain) María Sánchez Lorenzo
2. (Poland) Magdalena Grzybowska / (Canada) Marie-Ève Pelletier

== Draw ==
=== Key ===
- Q = Qualifier
- WC = Wild card
- LL = Lucky loser
- Alt = Alternate
- ITF = ITF entry
- PR = Protected ranking
- SR = Special ranking
- SE = Special exempt
- JE = Junior exempt
- JR = Junior Accelerator Programme entrant
- CO = College Accelerator Programme entrant
- NG = Next Gen Accelerator Program entrant
- w/o = Walkover
- r = Retired
- d = Defaulted

=== First qualifier ===
First round
1 | (United States) Lilia Osterloh (Austria) Barbara Schwartz | 8
(Canada) Maureen Drake (Austria) Sylvia Plischke | 2
WC | (Canada) Jana Nejedly (Canada) Aneta Soukup | 1
(Spain) Gala León García (Spain) María Sánchez Lorenzo | 8

Qualifying competition
1 | (United States) Lilia Osterloh (Austria) Barbara Schwartz | 8
(Spain) Gala León García (Spain) María Sánchez Lorenzo | 9

=== Second qualifier ===
First round
(France) Amélie Cocheteux (France) Sarah Pitkowski | 6
(Poland) Magdalena Grzybowska (Canada) Marie-Ève Pelletier | 8
(Luxembourg) Anne Kremer (South Africa) Joannette Kruger | 8
2 | (Spain) Cristina Torrens Valero (Germany) Marlene Weingärtner | 3

Qualifying competition
(Poland) Magdalena Grzybowska (Canada) Marie-Ève Pelletier | 8
(Luxembourg) Anne Kremer (South Africa) Joannette Kruger | 4
