= Frédéric Niemeyer =

Canadian tennis player (born 1976)

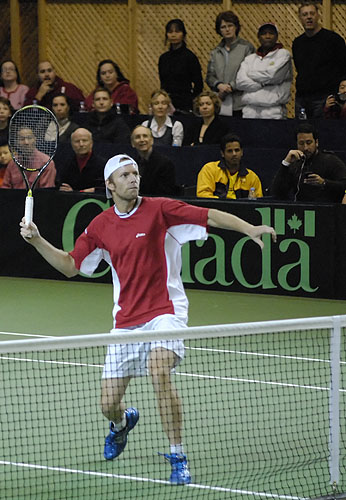
- Country (sports): Canada
- Residence: Deauville, Quebec Canada
- Born: April 24, 1976 (age 49) Campbellton, New Brunswick Canada
- Height: 1.90 m (6 ft 3 in)
- Turned pro: 1998
- Retired: 2009
- Plays: Right-handed (two-handed backhand)
- College: Middle Tennessee Blue Raiders
- Prize money: $530,673

Singles
- Career record: 13–32 (ATP, Grand Slam and Davis Cup)
- Career titles: 0
- Highest ranking: No. 134 (22 March 2004)

Grand Slam singles results
- Australian Open: Q2 (2000, 2006)
- French Open: Q2 (2005, 2007)
- Wimbledon: 2R (2003)
- US Open: Q2 (1999, 2000, 2001, 2007)

Other tournaments
- Olympic Games: 1R (2004, 2008)

Doubles
- Career record: 20–16 (ATP, Grand Slam and Davis Cup)
- Career titles: 0
- Highest ranking: No. 142 (5 August 2002)

Grand Slam doubles results
- Wimbledon: 2R (2005, 2006)

Other doubles tournaments
- Olympic Games: 2R (2004)
- Davis Cup: 1R (2004)
- Last updated on: 31 May 2021.

Frédéric Niemeyer (born April 24, 1976) is a Canadian retired, professional tennis player and was tennis coach at Tennis Canada for 10 years and he is now a freelance Tennis Consultant and Coach.

== Career ==
Niemeyer reached a career-high ATP singles ranking of World No. 134 achieved on 22 March 2004. He also reached a career-high ATP doubles ranking of World No. 142, achieved on 5 August 2002.

In his only Grand Slam singles main draw appearance, Niemeyer reached the second round of the 2003 Wimbledon Championships by beating World No. 8 Félix Mantilla. He also reached the Wimbledon doubles second round on two occasions, in 2005 partnering Glenn Weiner, and again the following year with Tuomas Ketola.

Niemeyer took over as Canada's top-ranked singles player in the ATP rankings on 7 January 2002, when he surpassed both Sébastien Lareau and Daniel Nestor and remained Canada no. 1 until 6 January 2003. He had multiple stints as Canada's number one over the next three years alternating with Simon Larose and Frank Dancevic until 30 January 2006 when he was permanently displaced by Dancevic. He was named Canada's tennis Player of the Year for 2002.

Niemeyer played college tennis at Middle Tennessee State University. He lost in the finals to Michael Russell at the Rolex National Intercollegiate Indoor Championships.

== 1998 ==
Niemeyer reached the second round in singles as a qualifier at the Bloomfield Challenger) in February. In late June he reached the semi-finals in both singles and doubles (partnering Emin Ağayev) at the Canada F2 Futures. At the Granby Challenger, he lost in the first round in singles to World No. 228 Justin Bower, but finished runners up in doubles with Bobby Kokavec. He received a wild card at the Canadian Open losing in his opening match to Italian World No. 132 Vincenzo Santopadre, and also lost his opening match in doubles, again partnering Kokavec.

Niemeyer attempted to qualify for a grand slam tournament in August/September 1998 but lost in the first round of qualifying to No. 3 seed Laurence Tieleman, in three sets. Niemeyer next saw action in late September at the Champaign Challenger, losing in the second round in singles and first round in doubles. In October he played for the first time as a pro in Europe, at France F10, losing in the first round in singles, as the No. 3 seed, but reaching the semis in doubles, partnering Valentin Sanon. In early December in Clearwater, Florida, Niemeyer lost in the opening round of U.S.A. F11 in singles and reached the quarters (second round) in doubles, partnering Agaev for a second time.

== 1999 ==
Niemeyer started off the year brightly, reaching the semi-finals of U.S.A. F1 as the No. 8 seed in singles, where he lost to then World No. 682 James Blake. He reached the third round of U.S.A. F2 as the No. 9 seed, and then lost in the second round of qualifying for the Laser Vision USTA Challenger in Amarillo, Texas. In February Niemeyer saw his first ever Davis Cup action, losing the deciding rubber in straight sets to Colombian Hadad Mauricio.

In doubles, Niemeyer lost in the second round of both U.S.A. F1 and F2 partnering compatriot Dave Abelson, then again in the same round in Amarillo. In March in Manila, he reached the second round in singles at Philippines F1 as the No. 11 seed, but lost in the first in doubles, partnering Larose, as the No. 3 seeds. Then the following week at Philippines F2 he and Larose reached in the second round. In singles, as the No. 8 seed, he reached the second round.

Niemeyer attempted for the first time to qualify for Wimbledon, but lost to Max Mirnyi in three sets. In doubles qualifying, he and partner Yves Allegro lost in the first round. At Canada F3 Niemeyer reached the quarters in singles, as the No. 3 seed, but lost his opening match in doubles (partnering David McNamara). Next at Granby, he reached the second round in singles, losing to World No. 226 Jimy Szymanski in three sets. In doubles he again lost in the first round, partnering Grant Doyle as the No. 3 seeds. Two weeks again, Niemeyer was again with the Davis Cup team in a tie with a strong Bahamas, featuring Mark Knowles and Roger Smith. Niemeyer won his dead rubber handily over unheralded Lavaughan Munroe.

In early August Niemeyer again received a wild card into the main draw of the Canadian Open, and again lost his opening match, this time to World No. 25 Vince Spadea. He again lost in the opening round in doubles, this time partnering Guillaume Raoux. The following week Niemeyer qualified for the main draw of the Binghamton Challenger, reaching the second round in both singles and doubles. He next attempted to qualify for the main draw of the Washington Open, but lost in the second round (as the No. 14 seed). He also lost in qualifying for the Hamlet Cup, in the first round. Unseeded at qualifying for the U.S. Open, lost to No. 11 seed Michael Kohlmann in the second round.

In late September in singles Niemeyer lost in the first round of the Austin Challenger. The following week he lost in the first round of qualifying for the USTA Challenger of San Antonio. Three weeks later, Niemeyer won his first doubles title of his career, the U.S.A. F16 in Phoenix, partnering compatriot Jerry Turek. Losing in the first round in singles as the No. 2 seed, he reached the third round the following week in Clearwater at U.S.A. F17, as the top seed. He and Turek lost, however, in doubles qualifying. Two weeks later, Niemeyer lost in the first round of qualifying, as the top seed, for Acura USTA Pro Tennis Classic at Mission Hills. He won his first singles title the following week at the Champaign Challenger, winning a tight three-set final over compatriot and then No. 107 Sébastien Lareau. He would go on to lose in the opening round of the Burbank Challenger the following week.

== 2000 ==
Niemeyer qualified for the main draw in singles at the Waikoloa Challenger in late January, losing 4–6, 2–6 to André Sá in the first round. He played Davis Cup the following week and won a dead rubber over Adrián García of Chile. In late February he played both singles and doubles at Cherbourg Challenger, losing in the first round in singles and the second in doubles, partnering Ota Fukárek. The following week he lost in qualifying, in the first round as the No. 3 seed, at the Besançon Challenger in France and repeated that fate the next week at the Sparkessen Magdeburg Open. In late March he lost in singles in the first round of U.S.A. F7, as the No. 4 seed, but the following week, at U.S.A. F8, reached the second round, as the top seed, while winning doubles, partnering again Doyle. The next week at U.S.A. F9, Niemeyer reached the finals of the singles, as the No. 3 seed, losing to Damián Furmanski 2–6, 7–5, 4–6. In doubles he reached the second round, with Keith Brill.

Niemeyer lost in first round qualifying action in singles for the U.S. Men's Clay Court Championships at the beginning of May. He next played the inaugural Fergana Challenger, losing in the second round to eventual champion Vladimir Voltchkov, the No. 7 seed. He lost in the second round too in doubles, partnering Stefano Galvani. The following week Niemeyer reached the second round in singles at the 16th Eisenberg Jerusalem Open, and the lost in the first round in doubles (with Sébastien de Chaunac). Niemeyer attempted to qualify for the French Open for the first time but lost soundly in the first round, to No. 9 seed Gastón Etlis 6–1, 6–3. In June, he bypassed the grass-court season in Europe and played instead at a couple of American challenger events. Playing just singles, he reached the quarters in Tallahassee and lost in the first round at the USTA Tennis Championships of Denver. He did attempt to qualify for Wimbledon but lost in the first round of qualifying to Martin Lee.

In July at Granby, Niemeyer reached the finals in doubles, partnering Turek as an unseeded team, while he lost in the first round in singles as a wild card entrant, to Mark Knowles. Two weeks later in Winnetka, he again lost in singles in the first round, as the No. 8 seed, while reaching the quarters in doubles, again with Jerry Turek. Niemeyer took the opening set off Max Mirnyi but lost for the fourth straight time in the first round of the Canadian Open. He and Turek also bowed out in the opening round in doubles as wild card entrants.

Niemeyer and Turek fared better the following week in Binghamton, reaching the semi-final round after having qualified. In singles, Niemeyer again failed to win a match, this time losing World No. 257 Rodolphe Cadart. Niemeyer again attempted to qualify for the Legg Mason in Washington, D.C. and the Hamlet Cup in on Long Island but lost in the first round on both occasions. He lost in the second round of qualifying for the U.S. Open in singles, to No. 11 seed Takao Suzuki. Dropping down to Futures level for his next tournament in early September, Niemeyer reached the semi-finals, as the No. 2 seed, of France F17. He and partner Rik de Voest won the doubles tournament. The following week at France F18, the unseeded Niemeyer lost his only singles match and reached the second round in doubles, playing alongside Yves Allegro.

In October, Niemeyer played another Challenger event, the St. Francis Health System USTA Challenger, in Tulsa, and again lost his opening round match. In doubles, playing with Cedric Kauffmann, he reached the second round. The following week Niemeyer played U.S.A. F23 in Waco, reaching the semis in both singles and doubles. Two weeks later in Yokohama he again played doubles with Frenchman Kaufmann, and the tandem reached the semi-finals. The following week in Seoul, Niemeyer and Kaufmann reached the quarters. Meanwhile, in singles, Niemeyer lost both times in the Far East in the first round of the main draw. He failed to qualify for the main draw of the Osaka International Tennis Tournament, despite being the No. 2 seed.

Niemeyer finally won a Challenger event singles match when he defeated Glenn Weiner in the first round in Knoxville. He lost to World No. 136 Xavier Malisse in the next round. In doubles, he and Jerry Turek lost their opening match. This concluded a disappointing 2000 for Niemeyer in singles, who saw his ranking drop from World No. 229 on January 10 to World No. 354 on December 18. He had a successful year in doubles however, improving from a ranking of World No. 380 to No. 245 for the same dates, and claiming two titles, one runners-up, and three semi-finals appearances.

== 2001 ==
The year began as the previous won had left off. Niemeyer lost in the first round of USA F2 and F3 to far lesser ranked opponents in singles, but reached the semis of F2 and won F3 partnering his first-ever partner, fellow Quebecer Jocelyn Robichaud. He lost in the second round of qualifying in singles for the Dallas Challenger, he reached semis in doubles partnering Marcos Ondruska. Taking a week off, Niemeyer played his next three tournaments in Europe challengers. Partnering Cedric Kaufmann in doubles at Challenger 42 in Andrezieux, they lost in first round. The following week at the Cherbourg Challenger, they reached the finals. Niemeyer singles play finally improved. He qualified for both, reaching the second round of the main draw of the first event and the semi-finals at the second. To do so, he defeated three higher-ranked opponents before falling to World No. 192 Clemens Trimmel. At the Residenza Open two weeks later, held in Magdeburg, again getting through the qualifying rounds, Niemeyer reached the second round in singles. He won the doubles, partnering Radek Štěpánek.

In April, Niemeyer again was called upon to play Davis Cup, in America's Zone Group I second round tie away to Argentina. He competed in live rubbers for the first time, losing in straight sets in the tie's second match, to Franco Squillari. He also saw doubles action for the first time, partnering Robichaud. The tandem lost however to Agustín Calleri and Mariano Puerta in straight sets, as well, as Canada went down without winning a set. Immediately following the tie, Niemeyer contested singles at U.S.A. F9, but retired from his first round match. The following week at USA. F10, he reached the second round in both singles (as the No. 4 seed) and doubles. Two weeks later Niemeyer, partnering Doug Root, won doubles at Mexico F3, as the top seed. Losing in the first round in singles as the No. 2 seed, Niemeyer redeemed himself the following week at Mexico F4, again as the No. 2 seed, winning the tournament for his second-ever career singles title. He and Root reached the semis of this tourney.

Niemeyer focussed his attention to his singles from May to July. He reached the quarter-finals of Mexico F5 as the top seed. Three weeks later he played in a main draw at tour level on grass for the first time ever, qualifying to do so at the Surbiton Challenger. He won the first set before losing to Sargis Sargsian. The following week, Niemeyer lost in the first round of qualifying at Queen's. The week after, he reached the third round of qualifying for the Nottingham Open, as the No. 6 seed, falling to No. 3 seeded Arvind Parmar. Niemeyer reached the second round of qualifying for Wimbledon. He and partner Todd Perry reached the second and qualifying round in doubles but lost in straight sets. After a week off, Niemeyer, unseeded, reached the semis in singles at the Granby Challenger. The following week saw Niemeyer be the Canadian Davis Cup hero, as he won the deciding rubber, in four sets, over Miguel Gallardo Valles of Mexico at the Chapultepec Sports Club, in zonal play-offs tie.

August saw Niemeyer make his fifth straight wild card appearance at the Canadian Open. Again, for the second straight year he faced Max Miryni and lost is three sets. In doubles, he and partner Bobby Kokavec lost to the No. 2 seeded team of Donald Johnson and Jared Palmer. Niemeyer continued the same schedule as the previous summer, playing Binghamton, where he and partner Kokavec, unseeded, won the doubles. He lost in the first round in singles. In qualifying for the US Open in singles, Niemeyer lost in the second round to Australian veteran Todd Woodbridge. Next he again went to France, winning the singles title of France F17 in Plaisir, as the No. 4 seed. In doubles, he and partner Andrew Nisker, a fellow Canadian, reached the final as the No. 2 seeds. The following week, as a Special Entry and No. 1 seed, Niemeyer claimed a second singles title, and his fourth on tour, winning France F 18 in Nevers. Taking a week off, he withdrew from his first round qualifying match as the No. 4 seed at the IPP Open. Niemeyer's final action for 2001 came in doubles at Switzerland F3, where with partner Yves Allegro, as top seeds, he reached semi-finals.

== 2002 ==
Niemeyer began the year with a bang, winning his second ever singles title at the São Paulo Challenger. Unseeded, he defeated No. 7 seed Martín Vassallo Argüello in the final in two tie-breaks. He also won the doubles title, as the top seeds, partnering Brandon Coupe. Again not attempting to qualify for the Australian Open, Niemeyer next competed at the Dallas Challenger reaching the second round in singles, going out in three close sets to top seed Cecil Mamiit, and won the doubles, partnering Giorgio Galimberti. The following week in Davis Cup, Canada defeated Mexico in Waterloo, Ontario on carpet, as Niemeyer took the opening singles rubber as well as the doubles match, partnering Daniel Nestor for the first time. Two weeks later, as the tournament No. 4 seed, Niemeyer lost in the first round of the LTA Hull Challenger in England. He and partner Gilles Elseneer won the doubles, giving Niemeyer 3 titles in 3 tournaments for the year. Niemeyer next made his usual stops in France and Germany. In Cherbourg, Niemeyer played only singles and lost in the opening round. The week after in Magdeburg, he reached the second round in singles and doubles (with Galimberti). The following week at France F6, as the No. 4 seed, Niemeyer lost in the first round in singles and did not compete in doubles.

Taking a few weeks off, Niemeyer was again a big part of a big Davis Cup story for Canada. He won the opening singles over World No. 14 Fernando González of Chile as Canada swept the fancied South Americans, in Calgary on carpet, to qualify for World Group qualifying round. Two weeks later at the Birmingham Challenger he lost in the first round of both the singles and doubles, partnering Jack Waite). The following week, also on clay at the ARMS USTA Challenger, in Rocky Mount, North Carolina, Niemeyer again lost in the first round in singles and the semi-finals in doubles, playing alongside Cecil Mamiit. Losing in the first round of qualifying for the singles main draw at the French Open, Niemeyer played the Turin Challenger, reaching the second round. The following week, he was forced to retire from his second round qualifying match at the Surbiton Challenger. Recovering, Niemeyer reached the qualifying round of the Gerry Weber Open, as the No. 8 seed, losing in three sets to No. 2 seed Radek Štěpánek. He lost handily in the first round of qualifying for singles at Wimbledon, however, as well as in the second round in doubles qualification, partnering Belgian Elseneer. In the same week, he retired from his first round match of the Andorra Open, and lost there in the second round of doubles, partnering again Brandon Coupe.

Niemeyer returned to North America to play Granby for the sixth consecutive time, matching his singles result of the previous year, losing in the semis to World No. 219 and eventual champion Peter Luczak. As the top seeds in doubles, partnering Denis Golovanov, Niemeyer reached the semi-finals. He lost in the first round the following week at the Aptos Challenger in both singles and doubles (again with Golovanov). For the fifth straight year Niemeyer received a wild card into the main draw of the Tennis Masters Series event in Canada, and again failed to get out of the first round, this time losing to No. 3 seed Tommy Haas. Partnering fellow Quebecer Simon Larose, he reached the second round in doubles. Not playing Binghamton this year, Niemeyer lost in the first round of the Bronx Classic in both singles and doubles the following week. Two weeks later he lost in the first round of qualifying in singles at the U.S. Open.In late September he reached the second round in singles and semi-finals in doubles (partnering Coupe) at the Tulsa Challenger.

== 2008 ==
Niemeyer fell in the final qualifying round at Wimbledon to Izak van der Merwe after having defeated two higher ranked players, Harel Levy and Lukáš Dlouhý in the first two. At his first tournament in nearly two months, he reached the second round of the Rimouski Challenger, and then lost in the final qualifying round of the Champaign, Illinois challenger.

== 2009 ==
In a disappointing Davis Cup tie in March, where Canada lost to Ecuador 2–3 despite being up 2–1, Niemeyer lost both his single rubbers but won the doubles. He was again named to the Canadian team for the tie against Peru. Not surprisingly, he and Nestor won their doubles rubber, and he was called into singles action when Peter Polansky became ill, but lost in four sets to Luis Horna. Canada won the tie, however, 3–2.

Niemeyer defeated Samuel Groth in the first round singles qualifying for the ATP 250 event in Indianapolis by a score of 6–4, 4–6, 7–6^{(11–9)}. He lost in the next round to Go Soeda 6–7^{(4–7)}, 5–7. With a wild card entry the following week at the Granby Challenger, he reached the quarter-finals by dominating No. 8 seed Alexander Kudryavtsev 6–0, 6–1 and then betteringMichael Yani 6–3, 6–4 before falling to No.4 seed Kevin Anderson, 4–6, 0–6.

Niemeyer received a wild card entry into the main singles draw of the Rogers Cup. In the first round he surprisingly defeated Igor Kunitsyn 7–5, 6–1. He lost to World No. 1 Roger Federer 6–7, 4–6 in the second round. His result in Montreal saw Niemeyer climb 102 ranking places to reach World No. 385.

Niemeyer announced in his retirement in November 2009, and stated his intention to coach Milos Raonic.

== ATP Challenger and ITF Futures finals ==
=== Singles: 18 (14–4) ===
Legend ATP Challenger (7–1) ITF Futures (7–3)	Finals by surface Hard (12–4) Clay (1–8) Grass (1–0) Carpet (0–0)

Result	W–L	Date	Tournament	Tier	Surface	Opponent	Score
Loss	0–1	Jan 1999	USA F1, Altamonte Springs	Futures	Hard	(United States) James Blake	6–3, 3–6, 2–6
Win	1–1	Dec 1999	Urbana, United States	Challenger	Hard	(Canada) Sébastien Lareau	7–6, 3–6, 7–6
Loss	1–2	Apr 2000	USA F9, Mt. Pleasant	Futures	Hard	(Argentina) Damián Furmanski	2–6, 7–5, 4–6
Win	2–2	May 2001	Mexico F4, Guadalajara	Futures	Clay	(Mexico) Alejandro Hernández	6–1, 6–4
Win	3–2	Sep 2001	France F17, Plaisir	Futures	Hard	(France) Julien Benneteau	6–2, 6–1
Win	4–2	Oct 2001	France F18, Nevers	Futures	Hard	(Algeria) Slimane Saoudi	6–4, 6–7^{(5–7)}, 7–6^{(7–2)}
Win	5–2	Jan 2002	São Paulo, Brazil	Challenger	Hard	(Argentina) Martín Vassallo Argüello	7–6^{(8–6)}, 0–1 ret.
Win	6–2	May 2003	Jamaica F5, Montego Bay	Futures	Hard	(Russia) Pavel Ivanov	7–6^{(7–4)}, 6–4
Win	7–2	Feb 2005	Joplin, United States	Challenger	Hard	(Poland) Łukasz Kubot	4–6, 6–2, 6–3
Win	8–2	Jul 2005	Forest Hills, United States	Challenger	Grass	(India) Prakash Amritraj	6–4, 7–6^{(7–3)}
Win	9–2	Apr 2006	Valencia, United States	Challenger	Hard	(Germany) Benjamin Becker	4–6, 6–3, 6–2
Loss	9–3	Feb 2007	Joplin, United States	Challenger	Hard	(United States) Michael Russell	4–6, 1–6
Loss	9–4	Mar 2007	Canada F1, Hull	Futures	Hard	(Italy) Adriano Biasella	6–3, 6–7^{(7–9)}, 4–6
Win	10–4	Mar 2007	Canada F2, Montreal	Futures	Hard	(France) Vincent Millot	6–3, 6–4
Win	11–4	Mar 2007	Canada F3, Rock Forest	Futures	Hard	(France) Ludovic Walter	4–6, 6–3, 7–6^{(7–0)}
Win	12–4	Apr 2007	Cardiff, United Kingdom	Challenger	Hard	(United Kingdom) Alex Bogdanovic	6–4, 7–5
Win	13–4	Aug 2007	Vancouver, Canada	Challenger	Hard	(United States) Sam Querrey	4–6, 6–4, 6–3
Win	14–4	Mar 2009	Canada F3, Sherbrooke	Futures	Hard	(France) Charles-Antoine Brézac	6–1, 6–2

=== Doubles: 18 (11–7) ===
Legend ATP Challenger (6–4) ITF Futures (5–3)	Finals by surface Hard (8–7) Clay (1–0) Grass (0–0) Carpet (2–0)

Result	W–L	Date	Tournament	Tier	Surface	Partner	Opponents	Score
Loss	0–1	Jul 1998	Granby, Canada	Challenger	Hard	(Canada) Bobby Kokavec	(Japan) Gouichi Motomura (Japan) Takao Suzuki	6–7, 1–6
Win	1–1	Oct 1999	USA F16, Waco	Futures	Hard	(Canada) Jerry Turek	(Australia) Matthew Breen (United States) Jason Cook	6–3, 6–4
Win	2–1	Apr 2000	USA F8, Little Rock	Futures	Hard	(Australia) Grant Doyle	(South Africa) Pieter Calitz (United States) Jeff Williams	6–2, 6–2
Loss	2–2	Jul 2000	Granby, Canada	Challenger	Hard	(Canada) Jerry Turek	(South Korea) Lee Hyung-Taik (South Korea) Yoon Yong-Il	6–7^{(3–7)}, 3–6
Win	3–2	Sep 2000	France F17, Bagnères-de-Bigorre	Futures	Hard	(South Africa) Rik de Voest	(Canada) Jerry Turek (Canada) Dave Abelson	6–3, 6–4
Win	4–2	Jan 2001	USA F3, Hallandale Beach	Futures	Hard	(Canada) Jocelyn Robichaud	(Israel) Noam Behr (Italy) Giorgio Galimberti	7–6^{(7–4)}, 6–3
Loss	4–3	Mar 2001	Cherbourg, France	Challenger	Hard	(France) Cedric Kauffmann	(Austria) Julian Knowle (Switzerland) Lorenzo Manta	6–3, 4–6, 3–6
Win	5–3	Mar 2001	Magdeburg, Germany	Challenger	Carpet	(Czech Republic) Radek Štěpánek	(Israel) Jonathan Erlich (Croatia) Lovro Zovko	7–6^{(7–2)}, 7–6^{(7–3)}
Win	6–3	May 2001	Mexico F3, Aguascalientes	Futures	Hard	(United States) Doug Root	(United States) Cary Franklin (United States) Jeff Williams	6–3, 6–4
Win	7–3	Aug 2001	Binghamton, United States	Challenger	Hard	(Canada) Bobby Kokavec	(Israel) Amir Hadad (Canada) Andrew Nisker	2–6, 6–4, 6–1
Loss	7–4	Sep 2001	France F17, Plaisir	Futures	Hard	(Canada) Andrew Nisker	(Belgium) Gilles Elseneer (Belgium) Wim Neefs	3–6, 7–6^{(7–3)}, 4–6
Win	8–4	Jan 2002	São Paulo, Brazil	Challenger	Hard	(United States) Brandon Coupe	(Argentina) Federico Browne (Peru) Luis Horna	6–7^{(5–7)}, 7–6^{(7–4)}, 6–4
Win	9–4	Feb 2002	Dallas, United States	Challenger	Hard	(Italy) Giorgio Galimberti	(United States) Huntley Montgomery (United States) Brian Vahaly	7–6^{(7–1)}, 6–4
Win	10–4	Feb 2002	Hull, United Kingdom	Challenger	Carpet	(Belgium) Gilles Elseneer	(Switzerland) Yves Allegro (South Africa) Wesley Moodie	6–4, 6–4
Win	11–4	Apr 2003	San Luis Potosí, Mexico	Challenger	Clay	(United States) Alex Bogomolov Jr.	(Austria) Alexander Peya (Germany) Markus Hantschk	6–4, 7–6^{(7–5)}
Loss	11–5	May 2003	Jamaica F5, Montego Bay	Futures	Hard	(United States) Mark Dietrich	(South Africa) Andrew Anderson (South Africa) Willem-Petrus Meyer	2–6, 6–1, 3–6
Loss	11–6	Apr 2004	León, Mexico	Challenger	Hard	(United States) Tripp Phillips	(Mexico) Bruno Echagaray (Mexico) Miguel Gallardo Valles	4–6, 6–7^{(1–7)}
Loss	11–7	Jan 2005	USA F2, Kissimmee	Futures	Hard	(Australia) David Mcnamara	(United States) Alex Kuznetsov (Germany) Mischa Zverev	7–6^{(7–5)}, 3–6, 6–7^{(6–8)}

== Performance timelines ==
Key
W	F	SF	QF	#R	RR	Q#	DNQ	A	NH

(W) winner; (F) finalist; (SF) semifinalist; (QF) quarterfinalist; (#R) rounds 4, 3, 2, 1; (RR) round-robin stage; (Q#) qualification round; (DNQ) did not qualify; (A) absent; (NH) not held; (SR) strike rate (events won / competed); (W–L) win–loss record.

=== Singles ===
Tournament	1997	1998	1999	2000	2001	2002	2003	2004	2005	2006	2007	2008	2009	SR	W–L	Win %
Grand Slam tournaments
Australian Open	A	A	A	Q2	A	A	A	Q1	A	Q2	A	Q1	A	0 / 0	0–0	–
French Open	A	A	A	Q1	A	Q1	A	A	Q2	Q1	Q2	Q1	A	0 / 0	0–0	–
Wimbledon	A	A	Q2	Q1	Q2	Q1	2R	Q1	Q2	Q1	Q1	Q3	A	0 / 1	1–1	50%
US Open	A	Q1	Q2	Q2	Q2	Q1	Q1	Q1	Q1	A	Q2	Q1	A	0 / 0	0–0	–
Win–loss	0–0	0–0	0–0	0–0	0–0	0–0	1–1	0–0	0–0	0–0	0–0	0–0	0–0	0 / 1	1–1	50%
ATP Tour Masters 1000
Indian Wells Masters	A	A	A	A	A	A	A	1R	A	Q1	A	Q2	A	0 / 1	0–1	0%
Miami Open	A	A	A	A	A	A	A	Q1	A	A	A	A	A	0 / 0	0–0	–
Canada Masters	1R	1R	1R	1R	1R	1R	1R	2R	1R	A	1R	1R	2R	0 / 12	2–12	14%
Win–loss	0–1	0–1	0–1	0–1	0–1	0–1	0–1	1–2	0–1	0–0	0–1	0–1	1–1	0 / 13	2–13	13%

=== Doubles ===
Tournament	1997	1998	1999	2000	2001	2002	2003	2004	2005	2006	2007	2008	SR	W–L	Win %
Grand Slam tournaments
Australian Open	A	A	A	A	A	A	A	A	A	A	A	A	0 / 0	0–0	–
French Open	A	A	A	A	A	A	A	A	A	A	A	A	0 / 0	0–0	–
Wimbledon	A	A	Q1	A	Q2	Q2	Q2	A	2R	2R	A	A	0 / 2	2–2	50%
US Open	A	A	A	A	A	A	A	A	A	A	A	A	0 / 0	0–0	–
Win–loss	0–0	0–0	0–0	0–0	0–0	0–0	0–0	0–0	1–1	1–1	0–0	0–0	0 / 2	2–2	50%
ATP Tour Masters 1000
Canada Masters	Q1	1R	1R	1R	1R	2R	2R	1R	1R	A	2R	1R	0 / 10	3–10	23%
Win–loss	0–0	0–1	0–1	0–1	0–1	1–1	1–1	0–1	0–1	0–0	1–1	0–1	0 / 10	3–10	23%

== Davis Cup ==
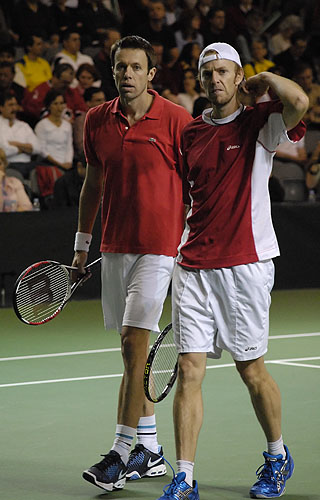
With Nestor (left), his Davis Cup and Olympics partner

In 16 Davis Cup ties for Canada, Niemeyer has a win – loss record of 20–10, including an impressive 11–2 record in doubles (9–1 partnering Daniel Nestor). In singles his best win came in 2002 when he defeated then World No. 14 Fernando González in a tie against Chile.

== Olympic tennis ==
Niemeyer competed in both singles and doubles at the 2004 Athens Olympics, reaching the second round in doubles partnering Daniel Nestor. He did the same for the 2008 Olympics, participating in the singles tournament as a late replacement. Despite winning the opening set 6–3, he retired from his first round match versus Guillermo Cañas with a slight shoulder injury, largely as a precaution, so as not to jeopardize through injury his and Nestor's participation in doubles. The Canadian tandem could not duplicate their result of four years previous, losing in the opening round.

== Personal ==
Niemeyer's mother is Acadian.

Niemeyer's father is German
