= Jerry Turek =

Canadian tennis player

- Country (sports): Canada
- Born: 2 April 1975 (age 49); Czechoslovakia
- Plays: Right-handed
- Prize money: $19,055

Singles
- Career titles: 0
- Highest ranking: No. 1089 (14 August 1995)

Doubles
- Career record: 1–4 (at ATP Tour level, Grand Slam level, and in Davis Cup)
- Career titles: 0; 2 Challenger, 5 Futures
- Highest ranking: No. 183 (11 June 2001)

Jerry Turek (born 2 April 1975) is a former Canadian tennis player.

Turek has a career high ATP singles ranking of world No. 1089, achieved on 14 August 1995. He also has a career high ATP doubles ranking of world No. 183 achieved on 11 June 2001.

Turek made his ATP main draw debut at the 1998 Canadian Open receiving a wild card that granted him direct entry in the doubles main draw. Partnering compatriot Simon Larose, the pair lost in the first round to American pairing Donald Johnson and Francisco Montana in three sets.

Turek reached 11 career doubles finals, with a record of 7 wins and 4 losses which includes a 2–1 record in ATP Challenger finals. He was never able to reach a single final in his career, at any level.

== ATP Challenger and ITF Futures finals ==
=== Doubles: 11 (7–4) ===
Legend ATP Challenger (2–1) ITF Futures (5–3)	Finals by surface Hard (6–3) Clay (1–1) Grass (0–0) Carpet (0–0)

Result	W–L	Date	Tournament	Tier	Surface	Partner	Opponents	Score
Loss	0–1	May 1999	USA F3, Tallahassee	Futures	Clay	(Canada) Simon Larose	(United States) Rob Givone (United States) Glenn Weiner	6–4, 3–6, 2–6
Win	1–1	Jul 1999	Canada F3, Montreal	Futures	Hard	(United States) Jeff Laski	(United States) Wynn Criswell (South Africa) Louis Vosloo	6–4, 4–6, 6–4
Win	2–1	Sep 1999	USA F16, Waco	Futures	Hard	(Canada) Frédéric Niemeyer	(United States) Jason Cook (Australia) Matthew Breen	6–3, 6–4
Win	3–1	Apr 2000	USA F9, Mt Pleasant	Futures	Hard	(United States) Gavin Sontag	(Australia) Grant Doyle (New Zealand) James Greenhalgh	7–6^{(7–3)}, 7–5
Loss	3–2	Jul 2000	Granby, Canada	Challenger	Hard	(Canada) Frédéric Niemeyer	(South Korea) Lee Hyung-Taik (South Korea) Yong-Il Yoon	6–7^{(3–7)}, 3–6
Loss	3–3	Sep 2000	France F17, Bagneres de Bigorre	Futures	Hard	(Canada) Dave Abelson	(South Africa) Rik De Voest (Canada) Frédéric Niemeyer	3–6, 4–6
Win	4–3	Dec 2000	USA F30, Scottsdale	Futures	Hard	(United States) Gavin Sontag	(United States) Zack Fleishman (United States) Jeff Williams	6–4, 6–0
Win	5–3	Feb 2001	Dallas, United States	Challenger	Hard	(United States) Gavin Sontag	(Federal Republic of Yugoslavia) Dusan Vemic (Croatia) Lovro Zovko	3–6, 7–5, 7–5
Win	6–3	Apr 2001	USA F9, Stone Mountain	Futures	Hard	(United States) Gavin Sontag	(United States) Brandon Hawk (United States) Robert Kendrick	1–6, 6–4, 6–3
Loss	6–4	Apr 2001	USA F10, Elkin	Futures	Hard	(United States) Gavin Sontag	(Australia) Matthew Breen (South Africa) Gareth Williams	3–6, 4–6
Win	7–4	May 2001	Antwerp, Belgium	Challenger	Clay	(Spain) Juan Giner	(Netherlands) Dennis Van Scheppingen (Netherlands) Edwin Kempes	6–7^{(4–7)}, 7–6^{(7–2)}, 6–3
