= Kelly Gullett =

American tennis player

- Country (sports): United States
- Residence: United States
- Born: 6 October 1977 (age 47)
- Plays: Right-handed
- College: Pepperdine University
- Prize money: $15,260

Doubles
- Career record: 0–0
- Career titles: 0; 1 Challenger, 2 Futures
- Highest ranking: No. 233 (26 November 2001)

Grand Slam doubles results
- US Open: Q2 (2000)
- Last updated on: 10 November 2021.

Kelly Gullett (born 6 October 1977) is a retired professional American tennis player who was a doubles specialist. Gullett reached a career-high ATP doubles ranking of world No. 233, achieved on 26 November 2001. He never received an official ATP singles ranking.

Gullett reached 9 career doubles finals with a record of 3 wins and 6 losses which includes a 1–4 record in ATP Challenger Tour finals. Alongside Canadian partner Bobby Kokavec, the pair won the 2001 GHI Bronx Tennis Classic defeating another Canadian-American duo Andrew Nisker and Gavin Sontag 6–4, 6–3 to claim his sole Challenger title.

== ATP Challenger and ITF Futures finals ==
=== Doubles: 9 (3–6) ===
Legend ATP Challenger (1–4) ITF Futures (2–2)	Finals by surface Hard (3–5) Clay (0–0) Grass (0–0) Carpet (0–1)

Result	W–L	Date	Tournament	Tier	Surface	Partner	Opponents	Score
Win	1–0	Oct 1999	USA F15, Beaumont	Futures	Hard	(United States) Zack Fleishman	(United States) Wynn Criswell (United States) Rob Givone	6–1, 7–6
Loss	1–1	Nov 1999	USA F17, Hattiesburg	Futures	Hard	(United States) Zack Fleishman	(South Africa) Gareth Williams (United States) Jeff Williams	3–6, 3–6
Win	2–1	Nov 1999	USA F18, Lafayette	Futures	Hard	(United States) Zack Fleishman	(United States) Mark Loughrin (United States) Alex Witt	6–4, 6–7, 7–6
Loss	2–2	Jun 2000	Tallahassee, United States	Challenger	Hard	(United States) Brandon Hawk	(The Bahamas) Mark Knowles (The Bahamas) Mark Merklein	6–7^{(3–7)}, 2–6
Loss	2–3	Dec 2000	USA F29, Laguna Niguel	Futures	Hard	(Netherlands) Djalmar Sistermans	(Slovakia) Karol Beck (France) Cedric Kauffmann	2–6, 3–6
Loss	2–4	Mar 2001	Kyoto, Japan	Challenger	Carpet	(United States) Brandon Hawk	(Israel) Noam Behr (Israel) Noam Okun	3–6, 5–7
Loss	2–5	Jul 2001	Aptos, United States	Challenger	Hard	(United States) Gavin Sontag	(United States) Brandon Hawk (United States) Robert Kendrick	5–7, 5–7
Win	3–5	Aug 2001	Bronx, United States	Challenger	Hard	(Canada) Bobby Kokavec	(Canada) Andrew Nisker (United States) Gavin Sontag	6–4, 6–3
Loss	3–6	Nov 2001	Knoxville, United States	Challenger	Hard	(United States) Brandon Coupe	(United States) Jeff Morrison (United States) Mardy Fish	3–6, 0–6
