= 1999 du Maurier Open – Men's doubles =

Men's doubles
- 1999 du Maurier Open

Final
- Champions: (Sweden) Jonas Björkman (Australia) Patrick Rafter
- Runners-up: (Zimbabwe) Byron Black (South Africa) Wayne Ferreira
- Score: 7–6^{(7–5)}, 6–4

Details
- Draw: 28
- Seeds: 8

Events
Singles	men	women
Doubles	men	women
- du Maurier Open

Martin Damm and Jim Grabb were the defending champions, but competed this year with different partners. Damm teamed up with Max Mirnyi and lost in second round to Ellis Ferreira and Rick Leach, while Grabb teamed up with Goran Ivanišević and lost in quarterfinals also against Ferreira-Leach.

Jonas Björkman and Patrick Rafter won the title by defeating Byron Black and Wayne Ferreira 7–6^{(7–5)}, 6–4 in the final.

== Seeds ==
The first four seeds received a bye into the second round.

1. (India) Leander Paes / (United States) Jared Palmer (quarterfinals)
2. (The Bahamas) Mark Knowles / (Canada) Daniel Nestor (second round)
3. (France) Olivier Delaître / (France) Fabrice Santoro (quarterfinals)
4. (Zimbabwe) Wayne Black / (Australia) Sandon Stolle (second round)
5. (South Africa) Ellis Ferreira / (United States) Rick Leach (semifinals)
6. (Sweden) Jonas Björkman / (Australia) Patrick Rafter (champions)
7. (Australia) Todd Woodbridge / (Australia) Mark Woodforde (first round)
8. (Russia) Yevgeny Kafelnikov / (Czech Republic) Daniel Vacek (first round)

== Draw ==
Key

- Q = Qualifier
- WC = Wild card
- LL = Lucky loser
- Alt = Alternate
- ITF = ITF entry
- PR = Protected ranking
- SR = Special ranking
- SE = Special exempt
- JE = Junior exempt
- JR = Junior Accelerator Programme entrant
- CO = College Accelerator Programme entrant
- NG = Next Gen Accelerator Program entrant
- w/o = Walkover
- r = Retired
- d = Defaulted

=== Finals ===
Semifinals
(South Africa) David Adams (South Africa) John-Laffnie de Jager	4	6^{5}
6	(Sweden) Jonas Björkman (Australia) Patrick Rafter	6	7^{7}
5	(South Africa) Ellis Ferreira (United States) Rick Leach	6	6^{5}	6^{3}
(Zimbabwe) Byron Black (South Africa) Wayne Ferreira	3	7^{7}	7^{7}

Final
6	(Sweden) Jonas Björkman (Australia) Patrick Rafter	7^{7}	6
(Zimbabwe) Byron Black (South Africa) Wayne Ferreira	6^{5}	4

=== Top half ===
First round
(Czech Republic) J Novák (Czech Republic) D Rikl	4	2
(South Africa) P Norval (Zimbabwe) K Ullyett	6	6
(United States) B Coupe (United States) E Taino	5	7^{7}	4
WC	(Canada) B Kokavec (Canada) J Robichaud	7	6^{4}	6
(South Africa) D Adams (South Africa) J-L de Jager	6	2	6
7	(Australia) T Woodbridge (Australia) M Woodforde	4	6	4
(Australia) A Florent (Australia) D Macpherson	6	6
(South Africa) M Barnard (South Africa) B Haygarth	4	3
(Canada) S Lareau (United States) A O'Brien	7^{7}	6
Q	(France) A Clément (France) S Grosjean	6^{5}	3
(United States) J Gimelstob (United States) R Reneberg	6^{7}	6^{3}
6	(Sweden) J Björkman (Australia) P Rafter	7^{9}	7^{7}

Second round
1	(India) L Paes (United States) J Palmer	6	2	6
(South Africa) P Norval (Zimbabwe) K Ullyett	3	6	4
WC	(Canada) B Kokavec (Canada) J Robichaud	6^{2}	6^{14}
(South Africa) D Adams (South Africa) J-L de Jager	7^{7}	7^{16}
3	(France) O Delaître (France) F Santoro	6	6
(Australia) A Florent (Australia) D Macpherson	3	2
(Canada) S Lareau (United States) A O'Brien	6^{3}	1
6	(Sweden) J Björkman (Australia) P Rafter	7^{7}	6

Quarterfinals
1	(India) L Paes (United States) J Palmer	5	6	6^{4}
(South Africa) D Adams (South Africa) J-L de Jager	7	4	7^{7}
3	(France) O Delaître (France) F Santoro	4	4
6	(Sweden) J Björkman (Australia) P Rafter	6	6

Semifinals
(South Africa) D Adams (South Africa) J-L de Jager	4	6^{5}
6	(Sweden) J Björkman (Australia) P Rafter	6	7^{7}

=== Bottom half ===
First round
5	(South Africa) E Ferreira (United States) R Leach	6	6
(United States) D Johnson (Czech Republic) C Suk	3	4
WC	(Netherlands) R Krajicek (Netherlands) J Siemerink	3	4
(Czech Republic) M Damm (Belarus) M Mirnyi	6	6
WC	(Canada) S Larose (Canada) J Turek	2	3
(United States) J Grabb (Croatia) G Ivanišević	6	6
8	(Russia) Y Kafelnikov (Czech Republic) D Vacek	6^{6}	6	0
(South Africa) R Koenig (Russia) A Olhovskiy	7^{8}	1	6
Q	(United States) M Joyce (United Kingdom) K Spencer	6	6^{3}	6
(Argentina) P Albano (Germany) N Kiefer	3	7^{7}	2
(Zimbabwe) B Black (South Africa) W Ferreira	3	6	7^{7}
(Canada) F Niemeyer (France) G Raoux	6	3	6^{4}

Second round
5	(South Africa) E Ferreira (United States) R Leach	7^{8}	7^{7}
(Czech Republic) M Damm (Belarus) M Mirnyi	6^{6}	6^{1}
(United States) J Grabb (Croatia) G Ivanišević	6	6
4	(Zimbabwe) W Black (Australia) S Stolle	4	4
(South Africa) R Koenig (Russia) A Olhovskiy	6	6^{5}	7^{7}
Q	(United States) M Joyce (United Kingdom) K Spencer	4	7^{7}	6^{4}
(Zimbabwe) B Black (South Africa) W Ferreira	3	6	6
2	(The Bahamas) M Knowles (Canada) D Nestor	6	0	2

Quarterfinals
5	(South Africa) E Ferreira (United States) R Leach	6	6
(United States) J Grabb (Croatia) G Ivanišević	4	3
(South Africa) R Koenig (Russia) A Olhovskiy	6^{4}	6^{4}
(Zimbabwe) B Black (South Africa) W Ferreira	7^{7}	7^{7}

Semifinals
5	(South Africa) E Ferreira (United States) R Leach	6	6^{5}	6^{3}
(Zimbabwe) B Black (South Africa) W Ferreira	3	7^{7}	7^{7}

== Qualifying ==
=== Seeds ===
1. (United Kingdom) Mark Martin / (United States) Alex Reichel (first round)
2. (United States) Michael Joyce / (United Kingdom) Kyle Spencer (qualified)
3. (Germany) Jan Boruszewski / (India) Syed Fazaluddin (qualifying competition)
4. (Sweden) Thomas Enqvist / (Sweden) Thomas Johansson (qualifying competition)

=== Qualifiers ===
1. (France) Arnaud Clément / (France) Sébastien Grosjean
2. (United States) Michael Joyce / (United Kingdom) Kyle Spencer

=== Draw ===
==== First qualifier ====
First round
1	(United Kingdom) Mark Martin (United States) Alex Reichel	2	2
(France) Arnaud Clément (France) Sébastien Grosjean	6	6
WC	(Canada) Tyson Parry (Canada) Mark Pellerin	6	1	6
3	(Germany) Jan Boruszewski (India) Syed Fazaluddin	3	6	7

Qualifying competition
(France) Arnaud Clément (France) Sébastien Grosjean	6	6
3	(Germany) Jan Boruszewski (India) Syed Fazaluddin	2	3

==== Second qualifier ====
First round
2	(United States) Michael Joyce (United Kingdom) Kyle Spencer	7	5	7
WC	(Paraguay) Ramón Delgado (Canada) Rob Steckley	6	7	5
WC	(Canada) Philip Gubenco (Canada) Charles-Antoine Sévigny	5	4
4	(Sweden) Thomas Enqvist (Sweden) Thomas Johansson	7	6

Qualifying competition
2	(United States) Michael Joyce (United Kingdom) Kyle Spencer	6	7
4	(Sweden) Thomas Enqvist (Sweden) Thomas Johansson	4	6
