= Doug Root =

American tennis player

- Country (sports): United States
- Born: December 16, 1977 (age 47)
- Height: 6 ft 2 in (188 cm)
- Prize money: $14,605

Singles
- Highest ranking: No. 688 (Apr 1, 2002)

Doubles
- Career record: 0–1
- Highest ranking: No. 388 (Oct 22, 2001)

Grand Slam doubles results
- US Open: Q1 (1999)

Doug Root (born December 16, 1977) is an American former professional tennis player.

A native of Mendham, New Jersey, Root played prep tennis at West Morris Mendham High School.

Root competed in collegiate tennis for Duke University, where he twice earned All-American honors for doubles. He was also the ACC Rookie of the Year in 1997 and a four-time All-ACC selection. In 2000 he partnered with Ramsey Smith to make the NCAA doubles semi-finals, the best ever run by a Duke pairing.

Root featured briefly on the professional tour after college and made an ATP Tour main draw appearances in doubles at the 2000 Hall of Fame Championships in Newport. He won five doubles titles at ITF Futures level.

== ITF Futures titles ==
=== Doubles: (5) ===
| No. | Date | Tournament | Surface | Partner | Opponents | Score |
|---|---|---|---|---|---|---|
| 1. | Jun 1999 | USA F8, Danville | Hard | (United States) Brandon Hawk | (South Africa) Haydn Wakefield (South Africa) Gareth Williams | 6–4, 6–7, 6–3 |
| 2. | Jul 1999 | USA F9, Redding | Hard | (United States) Brandon Hawk | (South Africa) Haydn Wakefield (South Africa) Gareth Williams | 6–2, 2–6, 6–2 |
| 3. | Nov 2000 | USA F26, Lafayette | Hard | (United States) Jack Brasington | (United States) Thomas Blake (United States) Jeff Morrison | W/O |
| 4. | May 2001 | Mexico F3, Aguascalientes | Hard | (Canada) Frédéric Niemeyer | (United States) Cary Franklin (United States) Jeff Williams | 6–3, 6–4 |
| 5. | Oct 2001 | Great Britain F10, Edinburgh | Hard | (Sweden) Henrik Andersson | (South Africa) Wesley Moodie (South Africa) Louis Vosloo | 6–2, 3–6, 7–5 |
