= Gareth Williams (tennis) =

South African tennis player

- Full name: Gareth Williams
- Country (sports): South Africa
- Born: 27 August 1975 (age 49); Pretoria, South Africa
- Height: 183 cm (6 ft 0 in)
- Plays: Right-handed
- Prize money: $26,685

Singles
- Career record: 0–0
- Career titles: 0; 0 Challenger, 0 Futures
- Highest ranking: No. 667 (18 February 1985)

Doubles
- Career record: 1–5
- Career titles: 0; 1 Challenger, 8 Futures
- Highest ranking: No. 179 (2 October 2000)

Grand Slam doubles results
- French Open: 1R (2001)
- Wimbledon: Q2 (1993)
- Last updated on: 14 May 2022.

Gareth Williams (born 27 August 1975) is a former professional tennis player from South Africa.

== Biography ==
Born in Pretoria, Williams was a doubles specialist, who had success as a junior in 1993 when he made three junior grand slam finals. After finishing runner-up at both the French Open and Wimbledon, he and Neville Godwin made a third successive final at the 1993 US Open, defeating the Australian pairing of Ben Ellwood and James Sekulov. He and Godwin also competed in several ATP Tour events, including Durban in 1993, where they made the quarter-finals.

In the mid-1990s he left the professional circuit to play collegiate tennis in the United States at the University of Tulsa (UT).

Graduating from UT with a psychology degree, he returned to the tour and in 2000 reached his best ranking of 179 in the world for doubles. He won a Challenger title in San Antonio in 2000 with Wesley Whitehouse, beating the Bryan brothers in the final. At the 2001 French Open he and Marcos Ondruska featured in the men's doubles main draw and lost in the first round to seventh seeds Ellis Ferreira and Rick Leach.

== Junior Grand Slam finals ==
=== Doubles: 3 (1 title, 2 runner-ups) ===
| Result | Year | Tournament | Surface | Partner | Opponents | Score |
|---|---|---|---|---|---|---|
| Loss | 1993 | French Open | Clay | (South Africa) Neville Godwin | (New Zealand) Steven Downs (New Zealand) James Greenhalgh | 1–6, 1–6 |
| Loss | 1993 | Wimbledon | Grass | (South Africa) Neville Godwin | (New Zealand) Steven Downs (New Zealand) James Greenhalgh | 7–6, 6–7, 6–7 |
| Win | 1993 | US Open | Hard | (South Africa) Neville Godwin | (Australia) Ben Ellwood (Australia) James Sekulov | 6–3, 6–3 |

== ATP Challenger and ITF Futures finals ==
=== Doubles: 14 (9–5) ===
| Legend ATP Challenger (1–1) ITF Futures (8–4) | Finals by surface Hard (9–4) Clay (0–1) Grass (0–0) Carpet (0–0) |

| Result | W–L | Date | Tournament | Tier | Surface | Partner | Opponents | Score |
|---|---|---|---|---|---|---|---|---|
| Win | 1–0 | Jun 1999 | USA F7, Berkeley | Futures | Hard | (South Africa) Haydn Wakefield | (United States) Dustin Mauck (United States) Keith Pollak | 5–7, 7–4, 6–4 |
| Loss | 1–1 | Jun 1999 | USA F8, Danville | Futures | Hard | (South Africa) Haydn Wakefield | (United States) Brandon Hawk (United States) Doug Root | 4–6, 7–6, 3–6 |
| Loss | 1–2 | Jul 1999 | USA F9, Redding | Futures | Hard | (South Africa) Haydn Wakefield | (United States) Brandon Hawk (United States) Doug Root | 2–6, 6–2, 2–6 |
| Loss | 1–3 | Aug 1999 | USA F12, St. Joseph | Futures | Hard | (United States) Jeff Williams | (United States) Cary Franklin (United States) Graydon Oliver | 4–6, 2–6 |
| Win | 2–3 | Aug 1999 | USA F13, Decatur | Futures | Hard | (United States) Jeff Williams | (Australia) Matthew Breen (Australia) John James | 6–4, 6–2 |
| Win | 3–3 | Aug 1999 | USA F14, Kansas City | Futures | Hard | (United States) Jeff Williams | (United States) Michael Passarella (United States) Jakub Teply | 6–0, 6–2 |
| Win | 4–3 | Nov 1999 | USA F17, Hattiesburg | Futures | Hard | (United States) Jeff Williams | (United States) Zack Fleishman (United States) Kelly Gullett | 6–3, 6–3 |
| Win | 5–3 | Dec 1999 | USA F21, Laguna Niguel | Futures | Hard | (United States) Jeff Williams | (Israel) Oren Motevassel (Germany) Alexander Waske | 2–6, 7–5, 6–2 |
| Win | 6–3 | Jan 2000 | USA F1, Pembroke Pines | Futures | Hard | (United States) Jeff Williams | (United States) Rafael De Mesa (Georgia (country)) Irak liLabadze | 6–4, 6–1 |
| Win | 7–3 | Jan 2000 | USA F3, Boca Raton | Futures | Hard | (United States) Jeff Williams | (Brazil) Marcos Daniel (Italy) Manuel Jorquera | 7–6^{(7–5)}, 6–2 |
| Loss | 7–4 | Aug 2000 | Sylt, Germany | Challenger | Clay | (Australia) Ashley Fisher | (Romania) Ionut Moldovan (Russia) Yuri Schukin | 4–6, 2–6 |
| Win | 8–4 | Oct 2000 | San Antonio, United States | Challenger | Hard | (South Africa) Wesley Whitehouse | (United States) Mike Bryan (United States) Bob Bryan | 6–3, 6–4 |
| Loss | 8–5 | Apr 2001 | USA F8, Little Rock | Futures | Hard | (Australia) Matthew Breen | (South Africa) Jeff Coetzee (South Africa) Shaun Rudman | 4–6, 6–7^{(3–7)} |
| Win | 9–5 | Apr 2001 | USA F10, Elkin | Futures | Hard | (Australia) Matthew Breen | (United States) Gavin Sontag (Canada) Jerry Turek | 6–3, 6–4 |
