= GHI Bronx Tennis Classic =

Defunct tennis tournament
- Tour: ATP Challenger Series
- Founded: 1993
- Abolished: 2008
- Editions: 16
- Location: Bronx, New York; United States
- Venue: Crotona Park
- Surface: Hard
- Draw: 32S/32Q/16D
- Website: Official Website

The GHI Bronx Tennis Classic was a tennis tournament for male professional players played on hard courts. The event was held annually in the Bronx, New York, as part of the ATP Challenger Series.

Egyptian tennis player Tamer El-Sawy detain the record for victories, having won two singles titles.

== Past finals ==
=== Singles ===
Year	Champion	Runner-up	Score
1993	(France) Jean-Philippe Fleurian	(United Kingdom) Chris Wilkinson	3–6, 7–5, 6–2
1994	(Spain) Alejo Mancisidor	(United States) Chris Woodruff	6–2, 6–4
1995	(Egypt) Tamer El-Sawy (1)	(Morocco) Hicham Arazi	5–7, 6–3, 6–2
1996	(Egypt) Tamer El-Sawy (2)	(Ecuador) Pablo Campana	6–1, 6–4
1997	(United States) Michael Sell	(Italy) Gianluca Pozzi	3–6, 6–4, 6–3
1998	(United Kingdom) Miles MacLagan	(Israel) Oren Motevassel	7–6(2), 6–2
1999	(Germany) Alexander Popp	(France) Sébastien de Chaunac	6–7(4), 7–6(4), 6–0
2000	(South Korea) Hyung-Taik Lee	(Belgium) Réginald Willems	6–4, 6–1
2001	(Germany) Björn Phau	(Israel) Andy Ram	6–2, 6–4
2002	(United States) Mardy Fish	(Russia) Denis Golovanov	1–6, 6–1, 7–5
2003	(Croatia) Ivo Karlović	(Russia) Dmitry Tursunov	6–3, 6–3
2004	(France) Julien Jeanpierre	(Netherlands) Peter Wessels	7–6(4), 3–6, 6–3
2005	(France) Thierry Ascione	(United States) Brian Vahaly	6–2, 6–3
2006	(United States) Michael Russell	(Chile) Paul Capdeville	6–0, 6–2
2007	(United States) Sam Warburg	(Mexico) Bruno Echagaray	6–3, 6–7(5), 6–3
2008	(Czech Republic) Lukáš Dlouhý	(Argentina) Leonardo Mayer	6–0, 6–1

=== Doubles ===
Year	Champion	Runner-up	Score
1993	(South Africa) Johan de Beer (South Africa) Kevin Ullyett	(Australia) Wayne Arthurs (Australia) Grant Doyle	7–6, 7–6
1994	(United Kingdom) Chris Bailey (Sweden) Lars-Anders Wahlgren	(China) Bing Pan (China) Xia Jiaping	6–3, 7–5
1995	(Australia) Jamie Holmes (United Kingdom) Ross Matheson	(New Zealand) Steven Downs (New Zealand) James Greenhalgh	6–3, 5–7, 6–3
1996	(United States) David DiLucia (United States) Scott Humphries	(South Africa) Chris Haggard (United Kingdom) Chris Wilkinson	6–4, 6–1
1997	(Brazil) Nelson Aerts (Brazil) André Sá	(United States) Michael Sell (South Africa) Myles Wakefield	4–6, 7–5, 6–1
1998	(United States) Jared Palmer (Japan) Takao Suzuki	(Czech Republic) Ota Fukárek (Romania) Gabriel Trifu	6–1, 6–2
1999	(South Africa) Jeff Coetzee (Mexico) Alejandro Hernández	(United States) Rob Givone (United States) Glenn Weiner	6–4, 6–1
2000	(Czech Republic) Petr Luxa (South Africa) Wesley Whitehouse	(South Korea) Hyung-Taik Lee (South Korea) Yong-il Yoon	3–6, 6–3, 6–2
2001	(United States) Kelly Gullett (Canada) Bobby Kokavec	(Canada) Andrew Nisker (United States) Gavin Sontag	6–4, 6–3
2002	(United Kingdom) Jamie Delgado (United Kingdom) Arvind Parmar	(Slovakia) Karol Beck (Czech Republic) Tomáš Zíb	7–6(6), 6–1
2003	(France) Julien Benneteau (France) Nicolas Mahut	(Argentina) Martín García (United States) Graydon Oliver	6–3, 6–1
2004	(United States) Huntley Montgomery (United States) Tripp Phillips	(Russia) Igor Kunitsyn (Italy) Uros Vico	7–6(6), 6–7(8), 6–2
2005	(United States) Cecil Mamiit (United States) Brian Vahaly	(France) Julien Benneteau (France) Nicolas Mahut	6–4, 6–4
2006	(United Kingdom) Martin Lee (Israel) Harel Levy	(United States) Scott Lipsky (United States) David Martin	6–4, 7–5
2007	(India) Rohan Bopanna (Pakistan) Aisam-ul-Haq Qureshi	(United States) Alberto Francis (United States) Phillip King	6–3, 2–6, [10–5]
2008	(Czech Republic) Lukáš Dlouhý (Czech Republic) Tomáš Zíb	(Germany) Andreas Beck (Austria) Martin Fischer	3–6, 6–4, [11–9]

== See also ==
- List of tennis tournaments
