= 1999 du Maurier Open – Men's singles =

Men's singles
- 1999 du Maurier Open

Final
- Champion: (Sweden) Thomas Johansson
- Runner-up: (Russia) Yevgeny Kafelnikov
- Score: 1–6, 6–3, 6–3

Details
- Draw: 56
- Seeds: 16

Events
Singles	men	women
Doubles	men	women
- du Maurier Open

Thomas Johansson defeated Yevgeny Kafelnikov in the final, 1–6, 6–3, 6–3 to win the men's singles tennis title at the 1999 Canadian Open.

Patrick Rafter was the defending champion, but was defeated in the quarterfinals by Nicolas Kiefer.

== Seeds ==
A champion seed is indicated in bold text while text in italics indicates the round in which that seed was eliminated. The top eight seeds received a bye to the second round.

1. (Australia) Patrick Rafter (quarterfinals)
2. (United States) Andre Agassi (semifinals)
3. (Russia) Yevgeny Kafelnikov (final)
4. (United Kingdom) Tim Henman (second round)
5. (Netherlands) Richard Krajicek (second round)
6. (United States) Todd Martin (quarterfinals)
7. n/a
8. (Germany) Tommy Haas (third round)
9. (Germany) Nicolas Kiefer (semifinals)
10. (Sweden) Thomas Enqvist (first round)
11. (Sweden) **Thomas Johansson (champion)**
12. (United States) Vincent Spadea (third round)
13. (Croatia) Goran Ivanišević (first round)
14. n/a
15. (France) Sébastien Grosjean (second round)
16. (Sweden) Jonas Björkman (first round)
17. (South Africa) Wayne Ferreira (third round)

== Draw ==
Key

- Q = Qualifier
- WC = Wild card
- LL = Lucky loser
- Alt = Alternate
- ITF = ITF entry
- PR = Protected ranking
- SR = Special ranking
- SE = Special exempt
- JE = Junior exempt
- JR = Junior Accelerator Programme entrant
- CO = College Accelerator Programme entrant
- NG = Next Gen Accelerator Program entrant
- w/o = Walkover
- r = Retired
- d = Defaulted

=== Finals ===
Semifinals
9	(Germany) Nicolas Kiefer	**6**	1	3
11	(Sweden) **Thomas Johansson**	4	**6**	**6**
3	(Russia) **Yevgeny Kafelnikov**	**6**	**6**
2	(United States) Andre Agassi	1	4

Final
11	(Sweden) **Thomas Johansson**	1	**6**	**6**
3	(Russia) Yevgeny Kafelnikov	**6**	3	3

=== Top half ===
==== Section 1 ====
First round
(Italy) G Pozzi	5	**6**	3
Q	(United States) **A O'Brien**	**7**	4	**6**
(India) L Paes	4	2
(Australia) **J Stoltenberg**	**6**	**6**
(Czech Republic) **J Novák**	**6**	**6**
16	(Sweden) J Björkman	2	2
9	(Germany) **N Kiefer**	**6**	**7**
(Czech Republic) D Vacek	2	5
(Sweden) M Larsson	4	**6**	6^{1}
(France) **G Raoux**	**6**	4	**7^{7}**
(Australia) **A Ilie**	**6**	**7^{10}**
(Czech Republic) M Damm	4	6^{8}

Second round
1	(Australia) **P Rafter**	**6**	**6**
Q	(United States) A O'Brien	0	2
(Australia) J Stoltenberg	**6**	1	6^{5}
(Czech Republic) **J Novák**	3	**6**	**7^{7}**
9	(Germany) **N Kiefer**	**6**	**6**
(France) G Raoux	4	0
(Australia) A Ilie	3	4
8	(Germany) **T Haas**	**6**	**6**

Third round
1	(Australia) **P Rafter**	**6**	**6**
(Czech Republic) J Novák	3	4
9	(Germany) **N Kiefer**	**6**	**7^{7}**
8	(Germany) T Haas	3	6^{4}

Quarterfinals
1	(Australia) P Rafter	3	**7^{7}**	6^{4}
9	(Germany) **N Kiefer**	**6**	6^{5}	**7^{7}**

==== Section 2 ====
First round
(United States) **J Courier**	**7^{7}**	**6**
(Germany) R Schüttler	6^{2}	2
(United States) **J-M Gambill**	**6**	**6**
WC	(Canada) J Robichaud	0	0
(Australia) M Woodforde	3	**7**	6^{6}
17	(South Africa) **W Ferreira**	**6**	5	**7^{8}**
11	(Sweden) **T Johansson**	**6**	**6**
WC	(Canada) S Larose	2	3
(Zimbabwe) W Black	5	5
Q	(Belarus) **M Mirnyi**	**7**	**7**
(Canada) **S Lareau**	**7^{7}**	**6**
(United States) J Gimelstob	6^{2}	1

Second round
4	(United Kingdom) T Henman	1	**7^{7}**	4
(United States) **J Courier**	**6**	6^{3}	**6**
(United States) J-M Gambill	5	**6**	6^{8}
17	(South Africa) **W Ferreira**	**7**	3	**7^{10}**
11	(Sweden) **T Johansson**	**7**	**7^{8}**
Q	(Belarus) M Mirnyi	5	6^{6}
(Canada) **S Lareau**	4	**7^{7}**	**6**
5	(Netherlands) R Krajicek	**6**	6^{4}	4

Third round
(United States) **J Courier**	6^{3}	**6**	**7**
17	(South Africa) W Ferreira	**7^{7}**	4	5
11	(Sweden) **T Johansson**	**7^{7}**	4	**6**
(Canada) S Lareau	6^{4}	**6**	4

Quarterfinals
(United States) J Courier	4	4
11	(Sweden) **T Johansson**	**6**	**6**

=== Bottom half ===
==== Section 3 ====
First round
(Italy) **L Tieleman**	**6**	**6**
Q	(Germany) J Boruszewski	4	3
WC	(Canada) B Kokavec	2	4
(Netherlands) **J Siemerink**	**6**	**6**
WC	(Canada) F Niemeyer	6^{3}	4
12	(United States) **V Spadea**	**7^{7}**	**6**
13	(Croatia) G Ivanišević	4	4
(Zimbabwe) **B Black**	**6**	**6**
(United States) C Woodruff	4	**6**	3
Q	(Zimbabwe) **K Ullyett**	**6**	1	**6**
(Spain) A Martín	3	4
(Canada) **D Nestor**	**6**	**6**

Second round
6	(United States) **T Martin**	5	**6**	**6**
(Italy) L Tieleman	**7**	3	4
(Netherlands) J Siemerink	2	2
12	(United States) **V Spadea**	**6**	**6**
(Zimbabwe) B Black	**7**	4	6^{6}
Q	(Zimbabwe) **K Ullyett**	5	**6**	**7^{8}**
(Canada) D Nestor	4	4
3	(Russia) **Y Kafelnikov**	**6**	**6**

Third round
6	(United States) **T Martin**	**6**	**7^{7}**
12	(United States) V Spadea	3	6^{3}
Q	(Zimbabwe) K Ullyett	4	6^{5}
3	(Russia) **Y Kafelnikov**	**6**	**7^{7}**

Quarterfinals
6	(United States) T Martin	6^{8}	**7^{7}**	4
3	(Russia) **Y Kafelnikov**	**7^{10}**	6^{3}	**6**

==== Section 4 ====
First round
(France) **F Santoro**	**6**	**7**
(Germany) B Karbacher	2	5
WC	(Canada) P Gubenco	1	2
(Paraguay) **R Delgado**	**6**	**6**
(France) **A Clément**	**6**	2	**7**
10	(Sweden) T Enqvist	4	**6**	5
15	(France) **S Grosjean**	**6**	1	**6**
Q	(The Bahamas) M Knowles	2	**6**	2
(Slovakia) J Krošlák	**7**	5	1
(United States) **M Chang**	5	**7**	**6**
Q	(United States) **R Reneberg**	4	**6**	**7^{7}**
Q	(Australia) T Woodbridge	**6**	4	6^{3}

Second round
LL	(Germany) A Pretzsch	4	4
(France) **F Santoro**	**6**	**6**
(Paraguay) **R Delgado**	**6**	**7^{7}**
(France) A Clément	3	6^{2}
15	(France) S Grosjean	4	3
(United States) **M Chang**	**6**	**6**
Q	(United States) R Reneberg	**7^{7}**	0	3
2	(United States) **A Agassi**	6^{5}	**6**	**6**

Third round
(France) **F Santoro**	**6**	**6**
(Paraguay) R Delgado	4	2
(United States) M Chang	2	5
2	(United States) **A Agassi**	**6**	**7**

Quarterfinals
(France) F Santoro	0	3
2	(United States) **A Agassi**	**6**	**6**
