= 2009 Rogers Masters – Singles =

Singles
- 2009 Rogers Masters

Final
- Champion: (United Kingdom) Andy Murray
- Runner-up: (Argentina) Juan Martín del Potro
- Score: 6–7^{(4–7)}, 7–6^{(7–3)}, 6–1

Events
Singles	Doubles
← 2008 ·	Rogers Masters	· 2010 →

Andy Murray defeated Juan Martín del Potro in the final, 6–7^{(4–7)}, 7–6^{(7–3)}, 6–1 to win the men's singles tennis title at the 2009 Canadian Open.

Rafael Nadal was the defending champion, but lost in the quarterfinals to del Potro.

This was first time since 1973 on the ATP Tour that all of the top eight ranked players advanced to the quarterfinals of a single tournament.

== Seeds ==
The top eight seeds received a bye into the second round. All of them reached quarter-finals.

1. (Switzerland) Roger Federer (quarterfinals)
2. (Spain) Rafael Nadal (quarterfinals)
3. (United Kingdom) Andy Murray (champion)
4. (Serbia) Novak Djokovic (quarterfinals)
5. (United States) Andy Roddick (semifinals)
6. (Argentina) Juan Martín del Potro (final)
7. (France) Jo-Wilfried Tsonga (semifinals)
8. (Russia) Nikolay Davydenko (quarterfinals)
9. (France) Gilles Simon (third round)
10. (Spain) Fernando Verdasco (third round)
11. (Chile) Fernando González (third round)
12. (Sweden) ~~Robin Söderling~~ (withdrew due to elbow injury)
13. (France) Gaël Monfils (second round)
14. (Croatia) Marin Čilić (first round)
15. (Spain) Tommy Robredo (second round)
16. (Czech Republic) Radek Štěpánek (first round)
17. (Czech Republic) Tomáš Berdych (first round)

== Main draw ==
=== Key ===
- Q = Qualifier
- WC = Wild card
- LL = Lucky loser
- Alt = Alternate
- ITF = ITF entry
- PR = Protected ranking
- SR = Special ranking
- SE = Special exempt
- JE = Junior exempt
- JR = Junior Accelerator Programme entrant
- CO = College Accelerator Programme entrant
- NG = Next Gen Accelerator Program entrant
- w/o = Walkover
- r = Retired
- d = Defaulted

=== Finals ===
Quarterfinals
1	(Switzerland) Roger Federer	6^{5}	6	6^{3}
7	(France) Jo-Wilfried Tsonga	7^{7}	1	7^{7}
3	(United Kingdom) Andy Murray	6	6
8	(Russia) Nikolay Davydenko	2	4
5	(United States) Andy Roddick	6	7^{7}
4	(Serbia) Novak Djokovic	4	6^{4}
6	(Argentina) Juan Martín del Potro	7^{7}	6
2	(Spain) Rafael Nadal	6^{5}	1

Semifinals
7	(France) Jo-Wilfried Tsonga	4	6^{8}
3	(United Kingdom) Andy Murray	6	7^{10}
5	(United States) Andy Roddick	6	2	5
6	(Argentina) Juan Martín del Potro	4	6	7

Final
3	(United Kingdom) Andy Murray	6^{4}	7^{7}	6
6	(Argentina) Juan Martín del Potro	7^{7}	6^{3}	1

=== Top half ===
==== Section 1 ====
First round
(Russia) I Kunitsyn	5	1
WC	(Canada) F Niemeyer	7	6
(Switzerland) S Wawrinka	6	6
(Germany) N Kiefer	4	1
LL	(Kazakhstan) A Golubev	6	6
16	(Czech Republic) R Štěpánek	3	4
9	(France) G Simon	6	6
WC	(Canada) F Dancevic	1	2
(Israel) D Sela	4	6	3
Q	(Colombia) A Falla	6	3	6
(Germany) R Schüttler	6	6
(France) F Serra	4	0

Second round
1	(Switzerland) R Federer	7^{7}	6
WC	(Canada) F Niemeyer	6^{3}	4
(Switzerland) S Wawrinka	7	6
LL	(Kazakhstan) A Golubev	5	4
9	(France) G Simon	4	6	6
Q	(Colombia) A Falla	6	2	2
(Germany) R Schüttler	6	3	4
7	(France) J-W Tsonga	4	6	6

Third round
1	(Switzerland) R Federer	6	7^{7}
(Switzerland) S Wawrinka	3	6^{5}
9	(France) G Simon	3	3
7	(France) J-W Tsonga	6	6

Quarterfinals
1	(Switzerland) R Federer	6^{5}	6	6^{3}
7	(France) J-W Tsonga	7^{7}	1	7^{7}

==== Section 2 ====
First round
(Chinese Taipei) Y-h Lu	7^{7}	3	4
(France) J Chardy	6^{5}	6	6
(Australia) L Hewitt	1	4
Q	(Spain) JC Ferrero	6	6
(Russia) M Safin	2	6	2
13	(France) G Monfils	6	3	6
11	(Chile) F González	4	7^{8}	6
Q	(Canada) M Raonic	6	6^{6}	4
(Germany) T Haas	4	7^{7}	6
(Croatia) I Karlović	6	6^{3}	4
(Spain) G García López	5	6	1
(France) P-H Mathieu	7	0	6

Second round
3	(United Kingdom) A Murray	6	6
(France) J Chardy	4	2
Q	(Spain) JC Ferrero	6	7^{9}
13	(France) G Monfils	3	6^{7}
11	(Chile) F González	7^{7}
(Germany) T Haas	6^{2}	r
(France) P-H Mathieu	6^{4}	6^{2}
8	(Russia) N Davydenko	7^{7}	7^{7}

Third round
3	(United Kingdom) A Murray	6	6
Q	(Spain) JC Ferrero	1	3
11	(Chile) F González	6^{2}	5
8	(Russia) N Davydenko	7^{7}	7

Quarterfinals
3	(United Kingdom) A Murray	6	6
8	(Russia) N Davydenko	2	4

=== Bottom half ===
==== Section 3 ====
First round
(Russia) D Tursunov	5^{r}
(Russia) I Andreev	5
(Argentina) L Mayer	7^{8}	6
(Germany) M Zverev	6^{6}	3
(Spain) F López	1	7^{7}	1
10	(Spain) F Verdasco	6	6^{5}	6
14	(Croatia) M Čilić	6	6^{4}	1
(Russia) M Youzhny	4	7^{7}	6
Q	(United States) J Levine	3	4
SE	(United States) J Isner	6	6
WC	(Canada) B Agostinelli	3	6^{6}
WC	(Canada) P Polansky	6	7^{8}

Second round
5	(United States) A Roddick	6	7^{7}
(Russia) I Andreev	1	6^{3}
(Argentina) L Mayer	1	1
10	(Spain) F Verdasco	6	6
(Russia) M Youzhny	6^{8}	6	6
SE	(United States) J Isner	7^{10}	1	3
WC	(Canada) P Polansky	4	6^{6}
4	(Serbia) N Djokovic	6	7^{8}

Third round
5	(United States) A Roddick	7^{7}	4	7^{7}
10	(Spain) F Verdasco	6^{2}	6	6^{5}
(Russia) M Youzhny	3	4
4	(Serbia) N Djokovic	6	6

Quarterfinals
5	(United States) A Roddick	6	7^{7}
4	(Serbia) N Djokovic	4	6^{4}

==== Section 4 ====
First round
Q	(Czech Republic) J Hernych	6	6
Q	(France) J Benneteau	2	3
(Romania) V Hănescu	6	6
(Austria) J Melzer	4	3
(Germany) P Kohlschreiber	7^{7}	6^{9}	6
17	(Czech Republic) T Berdych	6^{5}	7^{11}	4
15	(Spain) T Robredo	6	6
Q	(United States) A Bogomolov Jr.	4	2
(Germany) P Petzschner	7	6
(United States) S Querrey	5	3
(Serbia) V Troicki	3	0
(Spain) D Ferrer	6	6

Second round
6	(Argentina) JM del Potro	6	7
Q	(Czech Republic) J Hernych	2	5
(Romania) V Hănescu	6	4	7
(Germany) P Kohlschreiber	3	6	5
15	(Spain) T Robredo	6^{3}	6^{4}
(Germany) P Petzschner	7^{7}	7^{7}
(Spain) D Ferrer	3^{r}
2	(Spain) R Nadal	4

Third round
6	(Argentina) JM del Potro	3	6	6
(Romania) V Hănescu	6	3	4
(Germany) P Petzschner	3	2
2	(Spain) R Nadal	6	6

Quarterfinals
6	(Argentina) JM del Potro	7^{7}	6
2	(Spain) R Nadal	6^{5}	1

== Qualifying ==
=== Seeds ===
1. (Spain) Juan Carlos Ferrero (qualified)
2. (France) Julien Benneteau (qualified)
3. (Kazakhstan) Andrey Golubev (qualifying competition, lucky loser)
4. (Russia) Teymuraz Gabashvili (qualifying competition)
5. (Czech Republic) Jan Hernych (qualified)
6. (Latvia) Ernests Gulbis (qualifying competition)
7. (United States) Kevin Kim (first round)
8. (France) Josselin Ouanna (qualifying competition, retired due to wrist injury)
9. (Germany) Michael Berrer (first round)
10. (United States) Rajeev Ram (first round)
11. (France) Michaël Llodra (qualifying competition)
12. (Canada) Jesse Levine (qualified)
13. (United States) Brendan Evans (first round)
14. (Colombia) Santiago Giraldo (first round)

=== Qualifiers ===
1. (Spain) Juan Carlos Ferrero
2. (France) Julien Benneteau
3. (Canada) Jesse Levine
4. (Canada) Milos Raonic
5. (Czech Republic) Jan Hernych
6. (Colombia) Alejandro Falla
7. (Russia) Alex Bogomolov Jr.

=== Lucky losers ===
1. (Kazakhstan) Andrey Golubev

=== Qualifying draw ===
==== First qualifier ====
First round
1	(Spain) Juan Carlos Ferrero	6	6
WC	(Canada) Pavel Krainik	1	0
(Croatia) Ivan Dodig	7^{7}	6
10	(United States) Rajeev Ram	6^{2}	4

Qualifying competition
1	(Spain) Juan Carlos Ferrero	6	0
(Croatia) Ivan Dodig	4	1^{r}

==== Second qualifier ====
First round
2	(France) Julien Benneteau	6	4	6
(Poland) Łukasz Kubot	4	6	3
(Ecuador) Nicolás Lapentti	1	6	6
9	(Germany) Michael Berrer	6	4	2

Qualifying competition
2	(France) Julien Benneteau	6^{7}	6	6
(Ecuador) Nicolás Lapentti	7^{9}	4	2

==== Third qualifier ====
First round
3	(Kazakhstan) Andrey Golubev	6	6
WC	(Canada) Pierre-Ludovic Duclos	2	2
(Andorra) Laurent Recouderc	6	3	4
12	(Canada) Jesse Levine	3	6	6

Qualifying competition
3	(Kazakhstan) Andrey Golubev	5	6	2
12	(Canada) Jesse Levine	7	3	6

==== Fourth qualifier ====
First round
4	(Russia) Teymuraz Gabashvili	7^{9}	2	5
WC	(Canada) Milos Raonic	6^{7}	6	7
(Switzerland) Marco Chiudinelli	7	6^{1}	2
11	(France) Michaël Llodra	5	7^{7}	6

Qualifying competition
WC	(Canada) Milos Raonic	6	7^{7}
11	(France) Michaël Llodra	4	6^{3}

==== Fifth qualifier ====
First round
5	(Czech Republic) Jan Hernych	6	6
WC	(Canada) Vasek Pospisil	2	2
(France) Sébastien de Chaunac	6	5	6
13	(United States) Brendan Evans	4	7	4

Qualifying competition
5	(Czech Republic) Jan Hernych	6	6
(France) Sébastien de Chaunac	4	1

==== Sixth qualifier ====
First round
6	(Latvia) Ernests Gulbis	6	6
(Czech Republic) Lukáš Dlouhý	1	2
(Colombia) Alejandro Falla	3	6	6
13	(Colombia) Santiago Giraldo	6	4	4

Qualifying competition
6	(Latvia) Ernests Gulbis	6^{4}	5
(Colombia) Alejandro Falla	7^{7}	7

==== Seventh qualifier ====
First round
7	(United States) Kevin Kim	0	1
(Russia) Alex Bogomolov Jr.	6	6
Alt	(France) Vincent Millot	7^{7}	6^{13}	0
8	(France) Josselin Ouanna	6^{4}	7^{15}	6

Qualifying competition
(Russia) Alex Bogomolov Jr.	2
8	(France) Josselin Ouanna	1^{r}
