= Andrew Nisker =

Canadian retired tennis player

- Country (sports): Canada
- Born: 21 August 1978 (age 48) Canada
- Height: 6'0
- Plays: Right-handed
- College: Vanderbilt University
- Prize money: $17,836

Singles
- Career record: 0–0
- Career titles: 0; 0 Challenger, 0 Futures
- Highest ranking: No. 756 (9 December 2002)

Doubles
- Career record: 1–1
- Career titles: 0; 0 Challenger, 3 Futures
- Highest ranking: No. 207 (5 August 2002)
- Last updated on: 31 May 2021.

Andrew Nisker (born 21 August 1978) is a retired Canadian professional tennis player.

Nisker reached a career high ATP singles ranking of World No. 756 achieved on 9 December 2002. He also had a career high ATP doubles ranking of World No. 207 achieved on 5 August 2002.

Nisker made his ATP Tour main draw debut in doubles at the 2002 Canada Masters held on hard courts in Toronto. Partnering up with compatriot Frank Dancevic, the pair received a wild card entry into the main doubles draw. They pulled off an upset victory in the first round by defeating Andrew Florent and Chris Haggard in three sets 3–6, 7–6^{(7–5)}, 6–2. They would go on to lose in the second round to seventh seeds and eventual semi-finalists David Prinosil and David Rikl in straight sets 4–6, 2–6.

Nisker attended Vanderbilt University on a scholarship. He won the NCAA Men's SEC Singles Championship in 2000. He competed at the 2003 Pan American Games held in Santo Domingo, Dominican Republic. Representing Canada, he lost in the singles first round to Santiago González in three sets 4–6, 6–3, 4–6.

Nisker reached his only career singles final in June 2002 at the Canada F1 ITF Futures tournament in Mississauga, Ontario, resulting in a loss to Trace Fielding. Additionally, he reached 11 career doubles finals, with a record of 3 wins and 8 losses which includes a 0–2 record in ATP Challenger finals.

== ATP Challenger and ITF Futures finals ==
=== Singles: 1 (0–1) ===
Legend ATP Challenger (0–0) ITF Futures (0–1)	Finals by surface Hard (0–1) Clay (0–0) Grass (0–0) Carpet (0–0)

Result	W–L	Date	Tournament	Tier	Surface	Opponent	Score
Loss	0–1	Jun 2002	Canada F1, Mississauga	Futures	Hard	(United States) Trace Fielding	3–6, 2–6

=== Doubles: 11 (3–8) ===
Legend ATP Challenger (0–2) ITF Futures (3–6)	Finals by surface Hard (3–8) Clay (0–0) Grass (0–0) Carpet (0–0)

Result	W–L	Date	Tournament	Tier	Surface	Partner	Opponents	Score
Loss	0–1	Feb 2001	Mexico F1, Chetumal	Futures	Hard	(United States) Tripp Phillips	(Czech Republic) Josef Neštický (Czech Republic) Jiri Vrbka	4–6, 2–6
Win	1–1	Feb 2001	Mexico F2, Cancún	Futures	Hard	(United States) Tripp Phillips	(Mexico) Jacobo Hernandez (Mexico) Dimitrio Martinez-Castro	4–6, 6–4, 6–1
Win	2–1	Jun 2001	Canada F1, Mississauga	Futures	Hard	(United States) Tripp Phillips	(United States) Steve Berke (United States) Kyle Porter	3–6, 7–6^{(7–4)}, 6–3
Loss	2–2	Jun 2001	Canada F2, Montreal	Futures	Hard	(United States) Tripp Phillips	(Canada) Bobby Kokavec (Canada) Nicolas Brochu	2–6, 4–6
Loss	2–3	Aug 2001	Binghamton, United States	Challenger	Hard	(Israel) Amir Hadad	(Canada) Bobby Kokavec (Canada) Frédéric Niemeyer	6–2, 4–6, 1–6
Loss	2–4	Aug 2001	Bronx, United States	Challenger	Hard	(United States) Gavin Sontag	(United States) Kelly Gullett (Canada) Bobby Kokavec	4–6, 3–6
Loss	2–5	Sep 2001	France F17, Plaisir	Futures	Hard	(Canada) Frédéric Niemeyer	(Belgium) Gilles Elseneer (Belgium) Wim Neefs	3–6, 7–6^{(7–3)}, 4–6
Loss	2–6	Jun 2002	Canada F2, Montreal	Futures	Hard	(United States) Jeff Laski	(Canada) Michal Ciszek (Canada) Nicolas Brochu	5–7, 6–4, 6–7^{(6–8)}
Loss	2–7	Jun 2002	Canada F3, Lachine	Futures	Hard	(United States) Trace Fielding	(India) Mustafa Ghouse (Indonesia) Peter Handoyo	6–7^{(6–8)}, 6–7^{(3–7)}
Win	3–7	Jun 2003	Canada F1, Mississauga	Futures	Hard	(United States) Trace Fielding	(Canada) Frank Dancevic (Jamaica) Ryan Russell	6–4, 7–6^{(7–2)}
Loss	3–8	Jun 2003	Canada F2, Montreal	Futures	Hard	(United States) Trace Fielding	(United States) Huntley Montgomery (United States) Ryan Sachire	3–6, 4–6
