= 1993 GHI Bronx Tennis Classic =

- Date: 16 August 1993 – 22 August 1993
- Edition: 1st
- Draw: 32S/32Q/16D
- Surface: Hard
- Location: New York, United States
- Venue: Crotona Park

Champions

Singles
- (France) Jean-Philippe Fleurian

Doubles
- (South Africa) Johan de Beer / (Zimbabwe) Kevin Ullyett
- GHI Bronx Tennis Classic

The GHI Bronx Tennis Classic 1993 has been a tennis tournament within the ATP Challenger Series, taking place during the ATP Challenger Series 1993. The tournament was played in Bronx, in the United States from the 16th to the 22nd of August 1993, on concrete.

== Champions ==
=== Singles ===
- (France) Jean-Philippe Fleurian def. (United Kingdom) Chris Wilkinson, 3–6, 7–5, 6–2

=== Doubles ===
- (South Africa) Johan de Beer / (Zimbabwe) Kevin Ullyett def. (Australia) Wayne Arthurs / (Australia) Grant Doyle, 7–6, 7-6
