= Jean-Philippe Fleurian =

French tennis player

- Country (sports): France
- Residence: Florida, United States
- Born: 11 September 1965 (age 59); Paris, France
- Height: 1.85 m (6 ft 1 in)
- Turned pro: 1985
- Retired: 1998
- Plays: Right-handed (one-handed backhand)
- Prize money: $1,352,977

Singles
- Career record: 107–156
- Career titles: 0; 6 Challenger, 0 Futures
- Highest ranking: No. 37 (30 April 1990)

Grand Slam singles results
- Australian Open: 4R (1996)
- French Open: 3R (1986, 1989)
- Wimbledon: 3R (1991, 1994)
- US Open: 2R (1987, 1990)

Doubles
- Career record: 81–110
- Career titles: 1; 8 Challenger, 0 Futures
- Highest ranking: No. 55 (29 January 1990)

Grand Slam doubles results
- Australian Open: QF (1990)
- French Open: 3R (1986, 1994)
- Wimbledon: QF (1996)
- US Open: 3R (1989)

Grand Slam mixed doubles results
- French Open: 3R (1988, 1998)
- Wimbledon: 1R (1989)
- Last updated on: 5 July 2022.

Jean-Philippe Fleurian (French: [ʒɑ̃ filip flœʁjɑ̃]; born 11 September 1965) is a former tennis player from France, who turned professional in 1985. In his career, he won one doubles title (1996, Marseille). The right-hander reached his highest ranking on the ATP Tour on 30 April 1990, when he became world No. 37. He now is retired and has two daughters.

Fleurian is today a member of the 'Champions for Peace' club, a group of 70 famous elite athletes committed to serving peace in the world through sport, created by Peace and Sport, a Monaco-based international organization.

== ATP career finals ==
=== Singles: 2 (2 runner-ups) ===
Legend Grand Slam Tournaments (0–0) ATP World Tour Finals (0–0) ATP Masters 1000 Series (0–0) ATP 500 Series (0–0) ATP 250 Series (0–2)	Finals by surface Hard (0–2) Clay (0–0) Grass (0–0) Carpet (0–0)	Finals by setting Outdoors (0–2) Indoors (0–0)

Result	W–L	Date	Tournament	Tier	Surface	Opponent	Score
Loss	0–1	Nov 1986	Itaparica, Brazil	Grand Prix	Hard	(Ecuador) Andrés Gómez	6–4, 4–6, 4–6
Loss	0–2	Jan 1991	Auckland, New Zealand	World Series	Hard	(Czech Republic) Karel Nováček	6–7^{(5–7)}, 6–7^{(4–7)}

=== Doubles: 4 (1 title, 3 runner-ups) ===
Legend Grand Slam Tournaments (0–0) ATP World Tour Finals (0–0) ATP Masters 1000 Series (0–0) ATP 500 Series (0–0) ATP 250 Series (1–3)	Finals by surface Hard (1–1) Clay (0–1) Grass (0–0) Carpet (0–1)	Finals by setting Outdoors (0–1) Indoors (1–2)

Result	W–L	Date	Tournament	Tier	Surface	Partner	Opponents	Score
Loss	0–1	May 1994	Madrid, Spain	World Series	Clay	(Switzerland) Jakob Hlasek	(Sweden) Rikard Bergh (Netherlands) Menno Oosting	3–6, 4–6
Loss	0–2	Feb 1995	Marseille, France	World Series	Carpet	(France) Rodolphe Gilbert	(South Africa) David Adams (Russia) Andrei Olhovskiy	1–6, 4–6
Win	1–2	Feb 1996	Marseille, France	World Series	Hard	(France) Guillaume Raoux	(South Africa) Marius Barnard (Sweden) Peter Nyborg	6–3, 6–2
Loss	1–3	Sep 1997	Toulouse, France	World Series	Hard	(Belarus) Max Mirnyi	(Netherlands) Jacco Eltingh (Netherlands) Paul Haarhuis	3–6, 6–7

== ATP Challenger and ITF Futures finals ==
=== Singles: 10 (6–4) ===
Legend ATP Challenger (6–4) ITF Futures (0–0)	Finals by surface Hard (4–3) Clay (2–1) Grass (0–0) Carpet (0–0)

Result	W–L	Date	Tournament	Tier	Surface	Opponent	Score
Loss	0–1	Nov 1989	Ilheus, Brazil	Challenger	Hard	(Australia) Richard Fromberg	6–3, 3–6, 2–6
Loss	0–2	Jan 1993	Tenerife, Spain	Challenger	Hard	(Spain) Jose-Francisco Altur	6–7, 4–6
Loss	0–3	May 1993	Rome, Italy	Challenger	Clay	(France) Thierry Guardiola	4–6, 2–6
Win	1–3	Jul 1993	Ostend, Belgium	Challenger	Clay	(Sweden) Jan Apell	7–6, 7–5
Win	2–3	Aug 1993	Bronx, United States	Challenger	Hard	(United Kingdom) Chris Wilkinson	3–6, 7–5, 6–2
Win	3–3	Sep 1993	Budapest, Hungary	Challenger	Clay	(Hungary) Sándor Noszály	6–4, 6–3
Win	4–3	Oct 1993	Ponte Vedra, United States	Challenger	Hard	(Venezuela) Maurice Ruah	7–6, 3–6, 6–2
Win	5–3	Jul 1995	São Paulo, Brazil	Challenger	Hard	(Italy) Vincenzo Santopadre	7–6, 6–3
Loss	5–4	Aug 1996	Istanbul, Turkey	Challenger	Hard	(Spain) Ignacio Truyol-Turrion	2–6, 4–6
Win	6–4	Aug 1997	Istanbul, Turkey	Challenger	Hard	(United Kingdom) Mark Petchey	6–3, 6–1

=== Doubles: 14 (8–6) ===
Legend ATP Challenger (8–6) ITF Futures (0–0)	Finals by surface Hard (5–4) Clay (3–2) Grass (0–0) Carpet (0–0)

Result	W–L	Date	Tournament	Tier	Surface	Partner	Opponents	Score
Win	1–0	Dec 1989	Brasília, Brazil	Challenger	Hard	(United States) Charles Beckman	(Argentina) Javier Frana (Argentina) Gustavo Luza	4–6, 6–3, 6–0
Win	2–0	Jul 1991	Campos do Jordão, Brazil	Challenger	Hard	(Senegal) Yahiya Doumbia	(Brazil) Nelson Aerts (Brazil) Danilo Marcelino	6–3, 6–3
Loss	2–1	Sep 1992	Budapest, Hungary	Challenger	Clay	(Germany) Markus Naewie	(Argentina) Horacio de la Peña (South Africa) Marcos Ondruska	4–6, 2–6
Win	3–1	Feb 1993	Punta Del Este, Uruguay	Challenger	Clay	(Netherlands) Mark Koevermans	(Brazil) William Kyriakos (Brazil) Fernando Meligeni	6–4, 6–1
Win	4–1	Feb 1993	Mar del Plata, Argentina	Challenger	Clay	(Netherlands) Mark Koevermans	(Russia) Andrey Merinov (Italy) Laurence Tieleman	6–3, 6–3
Loss	4–2	Jul 1993	Ostend, Belgium	Challenger	Clay	(Italy) Andrea Gaudenzi	(Netherlands) Stephen Noteboom (United States) Jack Waite	7–6, 1–6, 4–6
Win	5–2	Aug 1993	Istanbul, Turkey	Challenger	Hard	(The Bahamas) Roger Smith	(United Kingdom) Miles Maclagan (Romania) Dinu-Mihai Pescariu	7–6, 6–3
Loss	5–3	Oct 1993	Monterrey, Mexico	Challenger	Hard	(The Bahamas) Roger Smith	(South Africa) Lan Bale (South Africa) Kevin Ullyett	6–4, 2–6, 3–6
Win	6–3	May 1994	Ljubljana, Slovenia	Challenger	Clay	(France) Olivier Delaître	(Denmark) Kenneth Carlsen (Sweden) Mikael Tillström	6–1, 4–6, 6–1
Win	7–3	Aug 1995	Brasília, Brazil	Challenger	Hard	(Venezuela) Nicolás Pereira	(Israel) Noam Behr (Israel) Lior Mor	7–6, 6–2
Loss	7–4	Aug 1995	Rio de Janeiro, Brazil	Challenger	Hard	(Venezuela) Nicolás Pereira	(Portugal) João Cunha-Silva (Mexico) Óscar Ortiz	5–7, 6–4, 1–6
Loss	7–5	Jul 1996	São Paulo, Brazil	Challenger	Hard	(Portugal) João Cunha-Silva	(Mexico) Alejandro Hernández (Mexico) Óscar Ortiz	2–6, 6–7
Win	8–5	Aug 1997	Istanbul, Turkey	Challenger	Hard	(Portugal) João Cunha-Silva	(South Africa) Chris Haggard (United Kingdom) Mark Petchey	walkover
Loss	8–6	Mar 1998	Cherbourg, France	Challenger	Hard	(France) Stéphane Simian	(Italy) Massimo Ardinghi (Italy) Massimo Bertolini	3–6, 6–2, 4–6

== Performance timelines ==
Key
W	F	SF	QF	#R	RR	Q#	DNQ	A	NH

(W) winner; (F) finalist; (SF) semifinalist; (QF) quarterfinalist; (#R) rounds 4, 3, 2, 1; (RR) round-robin stage; (Q#) qualification round; (DNQ) did not qualify; (A) absent; (NH) not held; (SR) strike rate (events won / competed); (W–L) win–loss record.

=== Singles ===
Tournament	1985	1986	1987	1988	1989	1990	1991	1992	1993	1994	1995	1996	1997	1998	SR	W–L	Win %
Grand Slam tournaments
Australian Open	A	NH	A	A	A	3R	2R	1R	A	1R	2R	4R	2R	Q2	0 / 7	8–7	53%
French Open	1R	3R	1R	1R	3R	2R	1R	1R	1R	1R	1R	1R	Q2	Q3	0 / 12	5–12	29%
Wimbledon	A	A	1R	A	1R	1R	3R	1R	Q1	3R	A	1R	Q1	Q1	0 / 7	4–7	36%
US Open	A	A	2R	1R	1R	2R	1R	A	1R	1R	1R	1R	Q1	A	0 / 9	2–9	18%
Win–loss	0–1	2–1	1–3	0–2	2–3	4–4	3–4	0–3	0–2	2–4	1–3	3–4	1–1	0–0	0 / 35	19–35	35%
ATP Masters Series
Indian Wells	A	A	A	A	A	2R	1R	A	A	A	A	Q1	A	A	0 / 2	1–2	33%
Miami	A	A	1R	A	2R	4R	1R	1R	Q1	1R	2R	3R	Q1	A	0 / 8	6–8	43%
Monte Carlo	A	A	A	A	A	1R	1R	A	A	A	Q1	A	A	A	0 / 2	0–2	0%
Hamburg	A	A	A	A	A	1R	A	A	A	A	A	A	A	A	0 / 1	0–1	0%
Rome	A	A	A	A	A	2R	A	A	Q2	A	A	A	A	A	0 / 1	1–1	50%
Canada	A	A	A	2R	2R	2R	1R	A	A	A	A	A	A	A	0 / 4	3–4	43%
Cincinnati	A	A	A	A	A	2R	2R	A	A	1R	A	A	A	A	0 / 3	2–3	40%
Paris	A	A	A	A	A	A	A	A	A	1R	A	A	A	A	0 / 1	0–1	0%
Win–loss	0–0	0–0	0–1	1–1	2–2	6–7	1–5	0–1	0–0	0–3	1–1	2–1	0–0	0–0	0 / 22	13–22	37%

=== Doubles ===
Tournament	1985	1986	1987	1988	1989	1990	1991	1992	1993	1994	1995	1996	1997	1998	SR	W–L	Win %
Grand Slam tournaments
Australian Open	A	NH	A	A	A	QF	1R	A	A	1R	1R	A	1R	2R	0 / 6	4–6	40%
French Open	1R	3R	2R	1R	1R	1R	1R	1R	2R	3R	1R	2R	2R	1R	0 / 14	8–14	36%
Wimbledon	A	A	A	A	A	2R	A	A	A	A	A	QF	1R	1R	0 / 4	4–4	50%
US Open	A	A	A	A	3R	2R	A	A	1R	1R	A	2R	Q1	A	0 / 5	4–5	44%
Win–loss	0–1	2–1	1–1	0–1	2–2	5–4	0–2	0–1	1–2	2–3	0–2	5–3	1–3	1–3	0 / 29	20–29	41%
ATP Masters Series
Indian Wells	A	A	A	A	A	1R	A	A	A	A	A	A	A	A	0 / 1	0–1	0%
Miami	A	A	A	A	1R	A	A	A	A	Q1	2R	3R	3R	2R	0 / 5	6–5	55%
Monte Carlo	A	A	A	A	A	A	A	A	A	A	1R	A	A	A	0 / 1	0–1	0%
Hamburg	A	A	A	A	A	1R	A	A	A	A	A	A	2R	A	0 / 2	1–2	33%
Rome	A	A	A	A	A	1R	A	A	A	A	A	A	A	A	0 / 1	0–1	0%
Canada	A	A	A	1R	SF	1R	A	A	A	A	A	A	A	A	0 / 3	3–3	50%
Cincinnati	A	A	A	A	A	A	A	A	A	Q2	A	A	A	A	0 / 0	0–0	–
Paris	A	A	A	A	A	A	A	A	A	A	A	2R	1R	A	0 / 2	1–2	33%
Win–loss	0–0	0–0	0–0	0–1	3–2	0–4	0–0	0–0	0–0	0–0	1–2	3–2	3–3	1–1	0 / 15	11–15	42%
