= 1999 du Maurier Open – Women's singles =

Women's singles
- 1999 du Maurier Open

Final
- Champion: (Switzerland) Martina Hingis
- Runner-up: (United States) Monica Seles
- Score: 6–4, 6–4

Details
- Draw: 56
- Seeds: 16

Events
Singles	men	women
Doubles	men	women
- du Maurier Open

Martina Hingis defeated the four-time defending champion Monica Seles in the final, 6–4, 6–4 to win the women's singles tennis title at the 1999 Canadian Open. Seles' match win-streak was an Open Era tournament record.

== Seeds ==
The top eight seeds received a bye to the second round.

1. (Switzerland) Martina Hingis (champion)
2. (United States) Monica Seles (final)
3. (France) Mary Pierce (semifinals)
4. (Czech Republic) Jana Novotná (second round)
5. (Spain) Arantxa Sánchez Vicario (quarterfinals)
6. (South Africa) Amanda Coetzer (quarterfinals)
7. (France) Nathalie Tauziat (second round)
8. n.a.
9. (Austria) Barbara Schett (quarterfinals)
10. (France) Sandrine Testud (quarterfinals)
11. n.a.
12. (Spain) Conchita Martínez (third round)
13. (Switzerland) Patty Schnyder (first round)
14. (Romania) Irina Spîrlea (first round)
15. (Russia) Elena Likhovtseva (third round)
16. (United States) Chanda Rubin (third round)
17. (United States) Amy Frazier (first round)

== Draw ==
Key

- Q = Qualifier
- WC = Wild card
- LL = Lucky loser
- Alt = Alternate
- ITF = ITF entry
- PR = Protected ranking
- SR = Special ranking
- SE = Special exempt
- JE = Junior exempt
- JR = Junior Accelerator Programme entrant
- CO = College Accelerator Programme entrant
- NG = Next Gen Accelerator Program entrant
- w/o = Walkover
- r = Retired
- d = Defaulted

=== Finals ===
Quarterfinals
1	(Switzerland) Martina Hingis	6	6
5	(Spain) Arantxa Sánchez Vicario	1	1
3	(France) Mary Pierce	6	6
10	(France) Sandrine Testud	1	3
6	(South Africa) Amanda Coetzer	7	4	4
(France) Anne-Gaëlle Sidot	5	6	6
9	(Austria) Barbara Schett	3	6	1
2	(United States) Monica Seles	6	3	6

Semifinals
1	(Switzerland) Martina Hingis	7^{7}	6
3	(France) Mary Pierce	6^{3}	3
(France) Anne-Gaëlle Sidot	3	4
2	(United States) Monica Seles	6	6

Final
1	(Switzerland) Martina Hingis	6	6
2	(United States) Monica Seles	4	4

=== Top half ===
==== Section 1 ====
First round
(Italy) S Farina	5	4
(United States) C Morariu	7	6
WC	(Canada) M Nejedly	6	1	0
(France) N Dechy	1	6	6
(France) S Pitkowski	2	3
16	(United States) C Rubin	6	6
12	(Spain) C Martínez	6	6
(Spain) M Sánchez Lorenzo	3	1
(Australia) J Dokić	6	6
(Croatia) I Majoli	3	4
(Austria) S Plischke	4	1
(Slovakia) K Habšudová	6	6

Second round
1	(Switzerland) M Hingis	6	6
(United States) C Morariu	0	3
(France) N Dechy	2	6	4
16	(United States) C Rubin	6	4	6
12	(Spain) C Martínez	5	6	6
(Australia) J Dokić	7	1	4
(Slovakia) K Habšudová	5	2
5	(Spain) A Sánchez Vicario	7	6

Third round
1	(Switzerland) M Hingis	6	6
16	(United States) C Rubin	3	1
12	(Spain) C Martínez	6^{6}	1
5	(Spain) A Sánchez Vicario	7^{8}	6

Quarterfinals
1	(Switzerland) M Hingis	6	6
5	(Spain) A Sánchez Vicario	1	1

==== Section 2 ====
First round
(Romania) R Dragomir	6	7
(Poland) M Grzybowska	4	5
(Spain) G León García	6	6
Q	(Venezuela) M Vento	3	0
(Germany) A Huber	6	6
14	(Romania) I Spîrlea	2	1
10	(France) S Testud	6
(South Africa) M de Swardt	4	r
(Spain) M Serna	6	6
Q	(France) É Loit	3	0
Q	(Ukraine) E Tatarkova	6	4	1
(Croatia) S Talaja	4	6	6

Second round
3	(France) M Pierce	7^{7}	6
(Romania) R Dragomir	6^{2}	3
(Spain) G León García	3	1
(Germany) A Huber	6	6
10	(France) S Testud	6	3	6
(Spain) M Serna	4	6	3
(Croatia) S Talaja	6	6
LL	(France) A Cocheteux	4	1

Third round
3	(France) M Pierce	6	7
(Germany) A Huber	2	5
10	(France) S Testud	6	7^{9}
(Croatia) S Talaja	4	6^{7}

Quarterfinals
3	(France) M Pierce	6	6
10	(France) S Testud	1	3

=== Bottom half ===
==== Section 3 ====
First round
(Spain) C Torrens Valero	6^{3}	1
(South Africa) J Kruger	7^{7}	6
Q	(Australia) N Pratt	7^{7}	2	7^{7}
(Puerto Rico) K Brandi	6^{4}	6	6^{4}
(Croatia) M Lučić	6	6^{5}	6
13	(Switzerland) P Schnyder	3	7^{7}	3
17	(United States) A Frazier	3	6	5
(France) A-G Sidot	6	3	7
(Slovakia) H Nagyová	6	6
(Zimbabwe) C Black	4	1
WC	(Canada) S Jeyaseelan	5	2
(Japan) A Sugiyama	7	6

Second round
6	(South Africa) A Coetzer	6	6
(South Africa) J Kruger	1	2
Q	(Australia) N Pratt	6	2	3
(Croatia) M Lučić	4	6	6
(France) A-G Sidot	6	6
(Slovakia) H Nagyová	4	2
(Japan) A Sugiyama	5	6	6
4	(Czech Republic) J Novotná	7	2	1

Third round
6	(South Africa) A Coetzer	4	7^{7}	6
(Croatia) M Lučić	6	6^{1}	2
(France) A-G Sidot	6	6
(Japan) A Sugiyama	4	3

Quarterfinals
6	(South Africa) A Coetzer	7	4	4
(France) A-G Sidot	5	6	6

==== Section 4 ====
First round
(United States) J Capriati	6	6
LL	(Spain) Á Montolio	1	3
Q	(Germany) M Weingärtner	2	1
WC	(Canada) R Kolbovic	6	6
(United States) A Stevenson	2	5
9	(Austria) B Schett	6	7
15	(Russia) E Likhovtseva	3	6	6
(Israel) A Smashnova	6	2	1
Q	(Canada) M Drake	6	6
(Luxembourg) A Kremer	2	3
Q	(Colombia) F Zuluaga	4	3
Q	(Russia) T Panova	6	6

Second round
7	(France) N Tauziat	6	4	2
(United States) J Capriati	1	6	6
WC	(Canada) R Kolbovic	3	1
9	(Austria) B Schett	6	6
15	(Russia) E Likhovtseva	6	7
Q	(Canada) M Drake	0	5
Q	(Russia) T Panova	7^{7}	1	1
2	(United States) M Seles	6^{4}	6	6

Third round
(United States) J Capriati	3	2
9	(Austria) B Schett	6	6
15	(Russia) E Likhovtseva	6^{7}	3
2	(United States) M Seles	7^{9}	6

Quarterfinals
9	(Austria) B Schett	3	6	1
2	(United States) M Seles	6	3	6
