= Jan Boruszewski =

German tennis player

- Country (sports): Germany
- Born: 2 October 1977 (age 47)
- Prize money: $32,796

Singles
- Career record: 0–2
- Highest ranking: No. 341 (21 February 2000)

Doubles
- Highest ranking: No. 413 (1 May 2000)
Medal record
Summer Universiade
Silver medal – second place	2001 Beijing	Mixed doubles
Bronze medal – third place	2003 Daegu	Mixed doubles

Jan Boruszewski (born 2 October 1977) is a German former professional tennis player.

Boruszewski, who reached a career high singles ranking of 341 in the world, qualified for the main draw of two ATP Tour tournaments. He made his debut at the 1999 Canadian Open and also featured at the 2000 Heineken Trophy in Rosmalen.

As a student at the University of Hannover he represented Germany at the Summer Universiade, winning a silver medal in 2001 and bronze medal in 2003, both for mixed doubles.
