= 1999 du Maurier Open – Women's doubles =

Women's doubles
- 1999 du Maurier Open

Final
- Champion: (Czech Republic) Jana Novotná (France) Mary Pierce
- Runner-up: (Latvia) Larisa Neiland (Spain) Arantxa Sánchez Vicario
- Score: 6–3, 2–6, 6–3

Details
- Draw: 28
- Seeds: 8

Events
Singles	men	women
Doubles	men	women
- du Maurier Open

The 1999 du Maurier Open doubles was the doubles event of the one hundred and tenth edition of the Canadian Open; a WTA Tier I tournament and the most prestigious women's tennis tournament held in Canada.

Martina Hingis and Jana Novotná were the defending champions, but only Hingis didn't compete this year. However, Novotná successfully defended her title, competing with Mary Pierce and defeating Larisa Neiland and Arantxa Sánchez Vicario in the final.

== Seeds ==
The top four seeds received a bye into the second round.

1. (France) Alexandra Fusai / (France) Nathalie Tauziat (second round)
2. (Russia) Elena Likhovtseva / (Japan) Ai Sugiyama (quarterfinals)
3. (South Africa) Mariaan de Swardt / (Ukraine) Elena Tatarkova (semifinals)
4. (Czech Republic) Jana Novotná / (France) Mary Pierce (champions)
5. (Latvia) Larisa Neiland / (Spain) Arantxa Sánchez Vicario (final)
6. (Romania) Irina Spîrlea / (Netherlands) Caroline Vis (semifinals)
7. (United States) Corina Morariu / (United States) Kimberly Po (quarterfinals)
8. (Spain) Conchita Martínez / (Argentina) Patricia Tarabini (first round)

== Draw ==
Key

- Q = Qualifier
- WC = Wild card
- LL = Lucky loser
- Alt = Alternate
- ITF = ITF entry
- PR = Protected ranking
- SR = Special ranking
- SE = Special exempt
- JE = Junior exempt
- JR = Junior Accelerator Programme entrant
- CO = College Accelerator Programme entrant
- NG = Next Gen Accelerator Program entrant
- w/o = Walkover
- r = Retired
- d = Defaulted

=== Finals ===
Semifinals
5	(Latvia) Larisa Neiland (Spain) Arantxa Sánchez Vicario	6	6
3	(South Africa) Mariaan de Swardt (Ukraine) Elena Tatarkova	3	1
4	(Czech Republic) Jana Novotná (France) Mary Pierce	5	7	6
6	(Romania) Irina Spîrlea (Netherlands) Caroline Vis	7	5	2

Final
5	(Latvia) Larisa Neiland (Spain) Arantxa Sánchez Vicario	3	6	3
4	(Czech Republic) Jana Novotná (France) Mary Pierce	6	2	6

=== Top half ===
First round
(Italy) S Farina (Slovakia) K Habšudová	6	6
(South Africa) A Coetzer (Argentina) I Gorrochategui	4	4
(Romania) C Cristea (Romania) R Dragomir	3	6	6
(France) A Dechaume-Balleret (France) É Loit	6	1	4
(United States) N Arendt (Netherlands) M Bollegraf	2	1
5	(Latvia) L Neiland (Spain) A Sánchez Vicario	6	6
(Croatia) I Majoli (Spain) V Ruano Pascual	6	7^{7}
(South Africa) E de Villiers (South Africa) J Steck	2	6^{5}
(United States) A Frazier (United States) K Schlukebir	3	2
(Germany) B Rittner (Germany) E Wagner	6	6
Q	(Poland) M Grzybowska (Canada) M-È Pelletier	6	3	6
8	(Spain) C Martínez (Argentina) P Tarabini	4	6	4

Second round
1	(France) A Fusai (France) N Tauziat	4	4
(Italy) S Farina (Slovakia) K Habšudová	6	6
(Romania) C Cristea (Romania) R Dragomir	4	4
5	(Latvia) L Neiland (Spain) A Sánchez Vicario	6	6
3	(South Africa) M de Swardt (Ukraine) E Tatarkova	6	6
(Croatia) I Majoli (Spain) V Ruano Pascual	3	4
(Germany) B Rittner (Germany) E Wagner	6	6
Q	(Poland) M Grzybowska (Canada) M-È Pelletier	4	3

Quarterfinals
(Italy) S Farina (Slovakia) K Habšudová	6^{2}	3
5	(Latvia) L Neiland (Spain) A Sánchez Vicario	7^{7}	6
3	(South Africa) M de Swardt (Ukraine) E Tatarkova	6	6
(Germany) B Rittner (Germany) E Wagner	4	1

Semifinals
5	(Latvia) L Neiland (Spain) A Sánchez Vicario	6	6
3	(South Africa) M de Swardt (Ukraine) E Tatarkova	3	1

=== Bottom half ===
First round
7	(United States) C Morariu (United States) K Po	6	6
WC	(Canada) R Kolbovic (Canada) V Webb	3	4
(Canada) S Jeyaseelan (Switzerland) P Schnyder	6	4	6
(Australia) C Barclay (Australia) N Pratt	2	6	2
Q	(Spain) G León García (Spain) M Sánchez Lorenzo	0	5
(Slovenia) T Križan (Slovenia) K Srebotnik	6	7
6	(Romania) I Spîrlea (Netherlands) C Vis	7^{8}	7^{7}
WC	(United States) L McNeil (United States) A Stevenson	6^{6}	6^{4}
(Germany) A Huber (France) A-G Sidot	6	3	7
(Zimbabwe) C Black (Australia) J Dokić	3	6	5
(United States) C Rubin (France) S Testud	7	4	6
(Australia) K-A Guse (Australia) K Kunce	5	6	0

Second round
7	(United States) C Morariu (United States) K Po	6	6
(Canada) S Jeyaseelan (Switzerland) P Schnyder	2	4
(Slovenia) T Križan (Slovenia) K Srebotnik	5	4
4	(Czech Republic) J Novotná (France) M Pierce	7	6
6	(Romania) I Spîrlea (Netherlands) C Vis	4	6	6
(Germany) A Huber (France) A-G Sidot	6	4	0
(United States) C Rubin (France) S Testud	4	6	4
2	(Russia) E Likhovtseva (Japan) A Sugiyama	6	4	6

Quarterfinals
7	(United States) C Morariu (United States) K Po	2	3
4	(Czech Republic) J Novotná (France) M Pierce	6	6
6	(Romania) I Spîrlea (Netherlands) C Vis	6	6
2	(Russia) E Likhovtseva (Japan) A Sugiyama	3	4

Semifinals
4	(Czech Republic) J Novotná (France) M Pierce	5	7	6
6	(Romania) I Spîrlea (Netherlands) C Vis	7	5	2
