= Cary Franklin =

American tennis player

- Country (sports): United States
- Born: September 23, 1977 (age 47)
- Height: 6 ft 4 in (193 cm)
- Plays: Left-handed
- Prize money: $27,704

Singles
- Highest ranking: No. 668 (May 28, 2001)

Doubles
- Career record: 1–2
- Highest ranking: No. 383 (Nov 19, 2001)

Grand Slam doubles results
- US Open: 1R (2000)

Cary Franklin (born September 23, 1977) is an American former professional tennis player.

Franklin is a native of Atlanta, Georgia and while growing up had Paul Annacone as a mentor. Annacone shared a home with the Franklin family during him time as a professional tennis player.

A tall left-hander, Franklin played collegiate tennis under Craig Tiley at the University of Illinois, where he had both individual and team success. The team won the Big Ten Conference title in each of his four seasons from 1997 to 2000. He was a three-time All-American and won the NCAA doubles championship in 2000, partnering Graydon Oliver.

Franklin competed on the professional tour in the early 2000s, reaching career best rankings of 668 for singles and 383 for doubles. He featured in the doubles main draw of the 2000 US Open as a wildcard pairing with college teammate Graydon Oliver. In 2001 he and Oliver were doubles quarter-finalists at Delray Beach.

== ITF Futures titles ==
=== Doubles: (2) ===
No.	Date	Tournament	Surface	Partner	Opponents	Score
1.	Aug 1999	USA F12, St. Joseph	Hard	(United States) Graydon Oliver	(South Africa) Gareth Williams (United States) Jeff Williams	6–4, 6–2
2.	Jul 2001	Canada F3, Lachine	Hard	(India) Harsh Mankad	(India) Vikrant Chadha (New Zealand) James Shortall	7–6^{(4)}, 6–3
