= Bobby Kokavec =

Canadian tennis player

- Country (sports): Canada
- Born: 17 May 1976 (age 49) Windsor, Ontario, Canada
- Height: 6 ft 3 in (191 cm)
- Plays: Right-handed (two-handed backhand)
- Prize money: $115,924

Singles
- Career record: 1–5
- Career titles: 0; 0 Challenger, 1 Futures
- Highest ranking: No. 232 (17 November 1997)

Grand Slam singles results
- French Open: Q1 (1998)
- Wimbledon: Q1 (1998, 1999)
- US Open: Q1 (1997)

Doubles
- Career record: 6–12
- Career titles: 0; 7 Challenger, 4 Futures
- Highest ranking: No. 152 (9 November 1998)

Grand Slam doubles results
- Wimbledon: 2R (1999)
- Last updated on: 31 May 2021.

Bobby Kokavec (born 17 May 1976) is a former professional tennis player from Canada.

== Biography ==
Kokavec grew up in Tecumseh, Ontario and attended St. Anne's Catholic High School. At the age of 15 he was an Orange Bowl semi-finalist and won national junior titles in singles and doubles. A member of Canada's Sunshine Cup team in 1993, he also competed in the boys' events of Grand Slam tournaments and was a doubles quarter-finalist at the 1993 US Open, partnering Sjeng Schalken. He and Jocelyn Robichaud won the Under 18s doubles title at the 1994 Orange Bowl.

As a professional tennis player he made several appearances in ATP Tour level tournaments, including the main draws of every edition of the Canadian Open from 1994 to 1999. Doubles partners included Pat Cash in the 1996 tournament and Gustavo Kuerten in the 1997 edition. He made the second round of the singles in 1998, with a win over Steve Campbell. His best doubles performances on tour were the quarter-finals at the 1998 Legg Mason Tennis Classic, with partner Marco Osorio, as well as the quarter-finals of Boston's Pro Tennis Championships in 1999, teamed with Doug Flach.

Kokavec represented Canada in a tie against Mexico in the 1998 Davis Cup competition. The tie, an American Group 1 Quarter-final in Halifax, was won by Canada, with Kokavec's appearance coming in the first of the reverse singles, a loss to Alejandro Hernández.

With Romania's Gabriel Trifu as his partner, Kokavec participated in the men's doubles draw at the 1999 Wimbledon Championships. Playing as qualifiers, the pair defeated Alberto Martín and Eyal Ran in the first round, then were eliminated by top seeds and eventual champions Mahesh Bhupathi and Leander Paes.

In 2001 he had success on the Challenger tour with three titles, all in doubles, at Granby, Binghamton and the Bronx. It was his last year on tour as injuries forced his retirement from tennis. An inductee in the Windsor/Essex County Sports Hall of Fame, Kokavec now teaches tennis in Florida.

== ATP Challenger and ITF Futures finals ==
=== Singles: 2 (1–1) ===
| Legend ATP Challenger (0–1) ITF Futures (1–0) | Finals by surface Hard (0–0) Clay (1–1) Grass (0–0) Carpet (0–0) |

| Result | W–L | Date | Tournament | Tier | Surface | Opponent | Score |
|---|---|---|---|---|---|---|---|
| Loss | 0–1 | Sep 1997 | Guadalajara, Mexico | Challenger | Clay | (Mexico) Alejandro Hernández | 4–6, 7–5, 2–6 |
| Win | 1–1 | May 1999 | USA F3, Tallahassee | Futures | Clay | (Austria) Horst Skoff | 7–5, 6–1 |

=== Doubles: 11 (7–4) ===
| Legend ATP Challenger (3–4) ITF Futures (4–0) | Finals by surface Hard (7–2) Clay (0–2) Grass (0–0) Carpet (0–0) |

| Result | W–L | Date | Tournament | Tier | Surface | Partner | Opponents | Score |
|---|---|---|---|---|---|---|---|---|
| Loss | 0–1 | Nov 1997 | Guadalajara, Mexico | Challenger | Clay | (Mexico) Marco Osorio | (Brazil) Nelson Aerts (Brazil) André Sá | 6–7, 3–6 |
| Loss | 0–2 | Apr 1998 | San Luis Potosí, Mexico | Challenger | Clay | (Puerto Rico) Jose Frontera | (Netherlands) Edwin Kempes (Netherlands) Peter Wessels | 6–7, 6–4, 5–7 |
| Loss | 0–3 | Jul 1998 | Granby, Canada | Challenger | Hard | (Canada) Frédéric Niemeyer | (Japan) Gouichi Motomura (Japan) Takao Suzuki | 6–7, 1–6 |
| Loss | 0–4 | Oct 1999 | Houston, United States | Challenger | Hard | (Canada) Jocelyn Robichaud | (United States) David Di Lucia (United States) Michael Sell | 6–7, 0–6 |
| Win | 1–4 | Nov 1999 | USA F19, Grenelefe | Futures | Hard | (Canada) Jocelyn Robichaud | (France) Cedric Kauffmann (United Kingdom) Miles Maclagan | 4–6, 7–5, 6–1 |
| Win | 2–4 | Nov 1999 | USA F20, Clearwater | Futures | Hard | (United States) Brandon Hawk | (United States) Dustin Mauck (United States) Keith Pollak | 2–6, 6–3, 6–2 |
| Win | 3–4 | Feb 2000 | USA F4, Corpus Christi | Futures | Hard | (Argentina) Christian Kordasz | (Italy) Manuel Jorquera (Turkey) Efe Üstündağ | 6–2, 6–3 |
| Win | 4–4 | Jun 2001 | Canada F2, Montreal | Futures | Hard | (Canada) Nicolas Brochu | (Canada) Andrew Nisker (United States) Tripp Phillips | 6–2, 6–4 |
| Win | 5–4 | Jul 2001 | Granby, Canada | Challenger | Hard | (United States) Jeff Morrison | (United States) Robert Kendrick (United States) Brandon Hawk | 6–4, 6–4 |
| Win | 6–4 | Aug 2001 | Binghamton, United States | Challenger | Hard | (Canada) Frédéric Niemeyer | (Canada) Andrew Nisker (Israel) Amir Hadad | 2–6, 6–4, 6–1 |
| Win | 7–4 | Aug 2001 | Bronx, United States | Challenger | Hard | (United States) Kelly Gullett | (Canada) Andrew Nisker (United States) Gavin Sontag | 6–4, 6–3 |

== See also ==
- List of Canada Davis Cup team representatives
