= 1999 du Maurier Open =

- Date: August 2–8 (men); August 16–23 (women)
- Edition: 110th
- Surface: Hard / outdoor
- Location: Montreal, Canada (men); Toronto, Canada

Champions

Men's singles
- (Sweden) Thomas Johansson

Women's singles
- (Switzerland) Martina Hingis

Men's doubles
- (Sweden) Jonas Björkman / (Australia) Pat Rafter

Women's doubles
- (Czech Republic) Jana Novotná / (France) Mary Pierce
- Canadian Open

The 1999 Canadian Open (known as the du Maurier Open for sponsorship reasons) was a tennis tournament played on outdoor hard courts. It was the 110th edition of the Canada Masters, and was part of the ATP Super 9 of the 1999 ATP Tour, and of the Tier I Series of the 1999 WTA Tour. The men's event took place at the du Maurier Stadium in Montreal, Quebec, Canada, from August 2 through August 8, 1999, and the women's event at the National Tennis Centre in Toronto, Ontario, Canada, from August 16 through August 23, 1999.

== Finals ==
=== Men's singles ===
(Sweden) Thomas Johansson defeated (Russia) Yevgeny Kafelnikov, 1–6, 6–3, 6–3

- It was Thomas Johansson's 1st title of the year, and his 3rd overall. It was his 1st career Masters title.

=== Women's singles ===
(Switzerland) Martina Hingis defeated (United States) Monica Seles, 6–4, 6–4

- It was Martina Hingis' 6th title of the year, and her 25th overall. It was her 4th Tier I title of the year, and her 9th overall.

=== Men's doubles ===
(Sweden) Jonas Björkman / (Australia) Pat Rafter defeated (Zimbabwe) Byron Black / (Zimbabwe) Wayne Ferreira, 6–4, 6–3

=== Women's doubles ===
(Czech Republic) Jana Novotná / (France) Mary Pierce defeated (Latvia) Larisa Neiland / (Spain) Arantxa Sánchez Vicario, 6–3, 2–6, 6–3

== WTA entrants ==
=== Seeds ===
Country	Player	Rank	Seed
SUI	Martina Hingis	1	1
USA	Monica Seles	5	2
FRA	Mary Pierce	6	3
CZE	Jana Novotná	7	4
ESP	Arantxa Sánchez Vicario	10	5
RSA	Amanda Coetzer	9	6
FRA	Nathalie Tauziat	12	7
AUT	Barbara Schett	16	9
FRA	Sandrine Testud	14	10
ESP	Conchita Martínez	18	12
SUI	Patty Schnyder	19	13
ROU	Irina Spîrlea	20	14
RUS	Elena Likhovtseva	21	15
USA	Chanda Rubin	23	16
USA	Amy Frazier	24	17

=== Other entrants ===
The following players received wildcards into the singles main draw:

- (Canada) Martina Nejedly
- (Canada) Sonya Jeyaseelan
- (Canada) Renata Kolbovic

The following players received wildcards into the doubles main draw:

- (Canada) Renata Kolbovic / (Canada) Vanessa Webb
- (United States) Lori McNeil / (United States) Alexandra Stevenson

The following players received entry from the qualifying draw:

- (Venezuela) María Vento
- (France) Émilie Loit
- (Ukraine) Elena Tatarkova
- (Australia) Nicole Pratt
- (Germany) Marlene Weingärtner
- (Canada) Maureen Drake
- (Colombia) Fabiola Zuluaga
- (Russia) Tatiana Panova
- (Poland) Magdalena Grzybowska / (Canada) Marie-Ève Pelletier
- (Spain) Gala León García / (Spain) María Sánchez Lorenzo

The following players received entry as lucky losers:

- (France) Amélie Cocheteux
- (Spain) Ángeles Montolio
