= Jeff Williams (tennis) =

American tennis player

- Country (sports): United States
- Born: January 12, 1978 (age 47)
- Plays: Left-handed (two-handed backhand)
- Prize money: $50,498

Singles
- Career record: 0–0 (at ATP Tour level, Grand Slam level, and in Davis Cup)
- Career titles: 0; 0 Challenger, 2 Futures
- Highest ranking: No. 337 (August 5, 2002)

Doubles
- Career record: 1–2 (at ATP Tour level, Grand Slam level, and in Davis Cup)
- Career titles: 0; 2 Challenger, 8 Futures
- Highest ranking: No. 180 (July 31, 2000)
- Last updated on: October 2, 2017.

Jeff Williams (born January 12, 1978) is an American tennis player.

Williams has a career high ATP singles ranking of 337 achieved on August 5, 2002. He also has a career high ATP doubles ranking of 180, achieved on July 31, 2000. Williams has won 2 ITF singles titles.

== Futures and Challenger Doubles titles (10) ==
Legend (doubles)
Challengers (2)
Futures (8)

No.	Date	Tournament	Surface	Partner	Opponents in the final	Score
1.	August 8, 1999	(United States) Decatur, USA F13	Hard	(South Africa) Gareth Williams	(Australia) Matthew Breen (Australia) John James	6–4, 6–2
2.	August 15, 1999	(United States) Kansas City, USA F14	Hard	(South Africa) Gareth Williams	(United States) Michael Passarella (United States) Jakub Teply	6–0, 6–2
3.	November 7, 1999	(United States) Hattiesburg, USA F17	Hard	(South Africa) Gareth Williams	(United States) Zack Fleishman (United States) Kelly Gullett	6–3, 6–3
4.	December 5, 1999	(United States) Laguna Niguel, USA F21	Hard	(South Africa) Gareth Williams	(Israel) Oren Motevassel (Germany) Alexander Waske	2–6, 7–5, 6–2
5.	January 16, 2000	(United States) Pembroke Pines, USA F1	Hard	(South Africa) Gareth Williams	(United States) Rafael de Mesa (Georgia (country)) Irakli Labadze	6–4, 6–1
6.	January 30, 2000	(United States) Boca Raton, USA F3	Hard	(South Africa) Gareth Williams	(Brazil) Marcos Daniel (Italy) Manuel Jorquera	7–6^{(5)}, 6–2
7.	August 6, 2000	(United States) Decatur, USA F21	Hard	(United States) Jason Cook	(United States) Geoff Abrams (United States) Ramsey Smith	2–4, 4–0, 4–2, 2–4, 5–3
8.	November 26, 2000	Puebla, Mexico	Hard	(United States) Zack Fleishman	(Switzerland) Ivo Heuberger (Finland) Ville Liukko	6–3, 6–4
9.	July 22, 2001	(United States) Joplin, USA F18	Hard	(United States) Ryan Sachire	(Australia) Peter Luczak (United States) Chris Magyary	7–5, 6–3
10.	June 9, 2002	(United States) Tallahassee, USA	Hard	(United States) Levar Harper-Griffith	(United States) Huntley Montgomery (United States) Brian Vahaly	6–3, 4–6, 6–4

== Sources ==
- Jeff Williams at the Association of Tennis Professionals
- Jeff Williams at the International Tennis Federation
