= Matthew Breen (tennis) =

Australian tennis player

- Country (sports): Australia
- Born: 12 June 1976 (age 48)
- Plays: Right-handed
- Prize money: $59,047

Singles
- Career record: 0–1
- Career titles: 0
- Highest ranking: No. 249 (23 October 2000)

Grand Slam singles results
- Australian Open: 1R (2001)

Doubles
- Career record: 0–1
- Career titles: 0
- Highest ranking: No. 182 (2 October 2000)

Grand Slam doubles results
- Australian Open: 1R (2001)

Matthew "Matt" Breen (born 12 June 1976) is a former professional tennis player from Australia.

== Career ==
Breen, who played collegiate tennis for the UCLA Bruins, was a boys' doubles quarter-finalist in the 1993 Australian Open. He matched that performance at the same tournament a year later and also made the singles quarter-finals. With his partner from those events, Lee Pearson, Breen won the doubles title at the Victorian Junior Championship in 1994.

In the 2001 Australian Open, Breen competed in both the singles and men's doubles. He lost his singles match to Cecil Mamiit in five sets and also exited in the first round of the doubles, partnering Pearson.

== Challenger titles ==
=== Doubles: (1) ===
| No. | Year | Tournament | Surface | Partner | Opponents in the final | Score in the final |
|---|---|---|---|---|---|---|
| 1. | 2001 | Tallahassee, United States | Hard | (Australia) Lee Pearson | (United States) Brandon Hawk (United States) Robert Kendrick | 6–4, 6–2 |
