= Gavin Sontag =

American tennis player

- Country (sports): United States
- Born: 10 June 1977 (age 49)
- College: Illinois
- Prize money: $15,372

Singles
- Career record: 0–0 (at ATP Tour level, Grand Slam level, and in Davis Cup)
- Career titles: 0
- Highest ranking: No. 762 (2 October 2000)

Doubles
- Career record: 1–1 (at ATP Tour level, Grand Slam level, and in Davis Cup)
- Career titles: 1 Challenger, 4 ITF
- Highest ranking: No. 174 (27 August 2001)

Gavin Sontag (born 10 June 1977) is a former American tennis player.

Sontag has a career high ATP singles ranking of 762 achieved on 2 October 2000. He also has a career high ATP doubles ranking of 174 achieved on 27 August 2001.

Sontag made his ATP main draw debut at the 2001 Miller Lite Hall of Fame Championships in the doubles main draw. He played college tennis at Illinois.
