= 2000 US Open – Men's singles qualifying =

Men's singles qualifying
- 2000 US Open

Events
Singles	men	women		boys	girls
Doubles	men	women	mixed	boys	girls
WC Singles	men	women	quad
WC Doubles	men	women	quad
Legends	men	women	mixed

Qualification
Singles	men	women
Doubles	men	women
- US Open

This article displays the qualifying draw for the Men's Singles at the 2000 US Open.

== Seeds ==
1. (Israel) Harel Levy (qualified)
2. (Australia) Wayne Arthurs (qualified)
3. (Spain) Joan Balcells (first round)
4. (Belgium) Olivier Rochus (qualifying competition, lucky loser)
5. (Argentina) Federico Browne (first round)
6. (Italy) Laurence Tieleman (second round)
7. (Russia) Andrei Stoliarov (second round)
8. (Zimbabwe) Wayne Black (qualified)
9. (Sweden) Fredrik Jonsson (first round)
10. (Germany) Christian Vinck (qualified)
11. (Canada) Sébastien Lareau (qualified)
12. (Germany) Jens Knippschild (qualifying competition, lucky loser)
13. (Netherlands) John van Lottum (qualifying competition, lucky loser)
14. (Chile) Fernando González (qualified)
15. (France) Michaël Llodra (first round)
16. (Argentina) Gastón Etlis (first round)
17. (Netherlands) Jan Siemerink (qualified)
18. (Japan) Takao Suzuki (qualifying competition)
19. (France) Cyril Saulnier (qualified)
20. (Haiti) Ronald Agénor (first round)
21. (United Kingdom) Arvind Parmar (second round)
22. (Belgium) Réginald Willems (second round)
23. (Finland) Tuomas Ketola (second round)
24. (Australia) Todd Woodbridge (second round)
25. (Italy) Cristiano Caratti (second round)
26. (France) Jean-René Lisnard (first round)
27. (Czech Republic) Petr Luxa (second round)
28. (South Africa) Marcos Ondruska (first round)
29. (Belgium) Xavier Malisse (qualified)
30. (Spain) Óscar Burrieza (first round)
31. (South Africa) Neville Godwin (second round)
32. (Australia) Dejan Petrovic (first round)

== Qualifiers ==
1. (Israel) Harel Levy
2. (Australia) Wayne Arthurs
3. (United Kingdom) Barry Cowan
4. (Belgium) Xavier Malisse
5. (Czech Republic) Petr Kralert
6. (France) Cedric Kauffmann
7. (South Korea) Lee Hyung-taik
8. (Zimbabwe) Wayne Black
9. (United States) Michael Russell
10. (Germany) Christian Vinck
11. (Canada) Sébastien Lareau
12. (Germany) Lars Burgsmüller
13. (France) Cyril Saulnier
14. (Chile) Fernando González
15. (Netherlands) Jan Siemerink
16. (United Kingdom) Jamie Delgado

== Lucky losers ==
1. (Belgium) Olivier Rochus
2. (Germany) Jens Knippschild
3. (Netherlands) John van Lottum

== Qualifying draw ==
Key

- Q = Qualifier
- WC = Wild card
- LL = Lucky loser
- Alt = Alternate
- ITF = ITF entry
- PR = Protected ranking
- SR = Special ranking
- SE = Special exempt
- JE = Junior exempt
- JR = Junior Accelerator Programme entrant
- CO = College Accelerator Programme entrant
- NG = Next Gen Accelerator Program entrant
- w/o = Walkover
- r = Retired
- d = Defaulted

=== First qualifier ===
First round
1	(Israel) Harel Levy	6	6
(South Korea) Yoon Yong-il	4	3
WC	(United States) Jeff Morrison	6^{4}	6	1
(United States) James Blake	7^{7}	3	6
(France) Rodolphe Cadart	6	6
(Russia) Igor Kunitsyn	4	1
(Argentina) Guillermo Coria	2	1
31	(South Africa) Neville Godwin	6	6

Second round
1	(Israel) Harel Levy	7	6
(United States) James Blake	5	2
(France) Rodolphe Cadart	7^{11}	3	6
31	(South Africa) Neville Godwin	6^{9}	6	3

Qualifying competition
1	(Israel) Harel Levy	6	6
(France) Rodolphe Cadart	1	0

=== Second qualifier ===
First round
2	(Australia) Wayne Arthurs	7^{7}	7^{7}
(United States) Jeff Salzenstein	6^{5}	6^{4}
(Norway) Helge Koll-Frafjord	4	6	4
(Italy) Diego Nargiso	6	1	6
WC	(United States) Mashiska Washington	6	6^{5}	6^{6}
(South Africa) Jeff Coetzee	3	7^{7}	7^{8}
(Japan) Takahiro Terachi	7	6
32	(Australia) Dejan Petrovic	5	3

Second round
2	(Australia) Wayne Arthurs	6	6
(Italy) Diego Nargiso	3	4
(South Africa) Jeff Coetzee	7^{7}	2	6^{5}
(Japan) Takahiro Terachi	6^{5}	6	7^{7}

Qualifying competition
2	(Australia) Wayne Arthurs	7^{8}	6
(Japan) Takahiro Terachi	6^{6}	3

=== Third qualifier ===
First round
3	(Spain) Joan Balcells	4	7^{8}	3
(Czech Republic) František Čermák	6	6^{6}	6
(Czech Republic) Robin Vik	2	4
(United Kingdom) Martin Lee	6	6
(Netherlands) Rogier Wassen	4	4
(United States) Glenn Weiner	6	6
(United Kingdom) Barry Cowan	6	3	6
30	(Spain) Óscar Burrieza	4	6	2

Second round
(Czech Republic) František Čermák	2	2
(United Kingdom) Martin Lee	6	6
(United States) Glenn Weiner	6^{8}	6^{1}
(United Kingdom) Barry Cowan	7^{10}	7^{7}

Qualifying competition
(United Kingdom) Martin Lee	6^{4}	6	5
(United Kingdom) Barry Cowan	7^{7}	2	7

=== Fourth qualifier ===
First round
4	(Belgium) Olivier Rochus	3	7^{7}	6
(Germany) Oliver Gross	6	6^{5}	2
WC	(United States) Levar Harper-Griffith	3	4
(Spain) Álex López Morón	6	6
PR	(Mexico) Mariano Sánchez	4	6	7^{7}
(South Africa) Louis Vosloo	6	2	6^{4}
(France) Lionel Roux	3	4
29	(Belgium) Xavier Malisse	6	6

Second round
4	(Belgium) Olivier Rochus	7	6
(Spain) Álex López Morón	5	4
PR	(Mexico) Mariano Sánchez	3	1
29	(Belgium) Xavier Malisse	6	6

Qualifying competition
4	(Belgium) Olivier Rochus	2	5
29	(Belgium) Xavier Malisse	6	7

=== Fifth qualifier ===
First round
5	(Argentina) Federico Browne	7^{7}	6^{3}	3
(Czech Republic) Petr Kralert	6^{2}	7^{7}	6
(Switzerland) Lorenzo Manta	3	7^{7}	4
(Italy) Giorgio Galimberti	6	6^{3}	6
WC	(United States) Brandon Hawk	4	2
(Australia) Scott Draper	6	6
WC	(United States) Robby Ginepri	6	1	0
27	(Czech Republic) Petr Luxa	1	6	6

Second round
(Czech Republic) Petr Kralert	6	6
(Italy) Giorgio Galimberti	4	4
(Australia) Scott Draper	6	6
27	(Czech Republic) Petr Luxa	2	3

Qualifying competition
(Czech Republic) Petr Kralert	6	4	6
(Australia) Scott Draper	4	6	4

=== Sixth qualifier ===
First round
6	(Italy) Laurence Tieleman	7^{7}	2	6
WC	(United States) Brian Vahaly	6^{5}	6	3
(The Bahamas) Mark Knowles	7	6
(Venezuela) Jimy Szymanski	5	4
(Japan) Yaoki Ishii	6	4	2
(Germany) Marc-Kevin Goellner	4	6	6
(France) Cedric Kauffmann	7^{9}	6
28	(South Africa) Marcos Ondruska	6^{7}	4

Second round
6	(Italy) Laurence Tieleman	6^{6}	6^{4}
(The Bahamas) Mark Knowles	7^{8}	7^{7}
(Germany) Marc-Kevin Goellner	6^{4}	5
(France) Cedric Kauffmann	7^{7}	7

Qualifying competition
(The Bahamas) Mark Knowles	6	3	1
(France) Cedric Kauffmann	3	6	6

=== Seventh qualifier ===
First round
7	(Russia) Andrei Stoliarov	6	4	6
(Russia) Andrei Cherkasov	2	6	2
(Croatia) Ivo Karlović	6^{5}	4
(Finland) Ville Liukko	7^{7}	6
(Israel) Lior Dahan	1	4
(South Korea) Lee Hyung-taik	6	6
WC	(United States) David Wheaton	6	7
26	(France) Jean-René Lisnard	3	5

Second round
7	(Russia) Andrei Stoliarov	3	6	1
(Finland) Ville Liukko	6	3	6
(South Korea) Lee Hyung-taik	6	6
WC	(United States) David Wheaton	2	0

Qualifying competition
(Finland) Ville Liukko	4	7^{7}	2
(South Korea) Lee Hyung-taik	6	6^{3}	6

=== Eighth qualifier ===
First round
8	(Zimbabwe) Wayne Black	6	7
(Australia) Joseph Sirianni	2	5
(Israel) Noam Behr	7	7^{7}
(Argentina) Sebastián Prieto	5	6^{3}
(Mexico) Alejandro Hernández	4	2
(Australia) Matthew Breen	6	6
(Australia) Paul Kilderry	6	5	6^{5}
25	(Italy) Cristiano Caratti	3	7	7^{7}

Second round
8	(Zimbabwe) Wayne Black	2	7^{8}	6
(Israel) Noam Behr	6	6^{6}	0
(Australia) Matthew Breen	6	6
25	(Italy) Cristiano Caratti	3	1

Qualifying competition
8	(Zimbabwe) Wayne Black	6	7^{7}
(Australia) Matthew Breen	4	6^{3}

=== Ninth qualifier ===
First round
9	(Sweden) Fredrik Jonsson	4	6	6^{3}
(France) Nicolas Coutelot	6	3	7^{7}
(Israel) Andy Ram	4	5
(Slovakia) Ján Krošlák	6	7
(United States) Michael Russell	6	2	6
(Georgia (country)) Irakli Labadze	4	6	3
(Uzbekistan) Vadim Kutsenko	6^{8}	6	1
24	(Australia) Todd Woodbridge	7^{10}	3	6

Second round
(France) Nicolas Coutelot	4	6	4
(Slovakia) Ján Krošlák	6	3	6
(United States) Michael Russell	6	3
24	(Australia) Todd Woodbridge	3	1^{r}

Qualifying competition
(Slovakia) Ján Krošlák	1	3
(United States) Michael Russell	6	6

=== Tenth qualifier ===
First round
10	(Germany) Christian Vinck	4	7	6
(Romania) Răzvan Sabău	6	5	3
(Thailand) Danai Udomchoke	6	6
(Czech Republic) Jan Vacek	4	3
(Australia) James Sekulov	6	1	7^{7}
WC	(United States) Zack Fleishman	4	6	6^{5}
WC	(United States) Vincent Mackey	6	6^{10}	6^{9}
23	(Finland) Tuomas Ketola	3	7^{12}	7^{11}

Second round
10	(Germany) Christian Vinck	7	7^{7}
(Thailand) Danai Udomchoke	5	6^{2}
(Australia) James Sekulov	6	7^{7}
23	(Finland) Tuomas Ketola	3	6^{5}

Qualifying competition
10	(Germany) Christian Vinck	6	6
(Australia) James Sekulov	1	2

=== Eleventh qualifier ===
First round
11	(Canada) Sébastien Lareau	7	5	7
(Switzerland) Ivo Heuberger	5	7	5
(Brazil) Daniel Melo	4	4
(Denmark) Kristian Pless	6	6
(Socialist Federal Republic of Yugoslavia) Dušan Vemić	6^{5}	6^{3}
(United States) Hugo Armando	7^{7}	7^{7}
(United States) Mike Bryan	6	6^{6}	4
21	(United Kingdom) Arvind Parmar	4	7^{8}	6

Second round
11	(Canada) Sébastien Lareau	6	3	6
(Denmark) Kristian Pless	4	6	3
(United States) Hugo Armando	7^{7}	0
21	(United Kingdom) Arvind Parmar	6^{4}	1^{r}

Qualifying competition
11	(Canada) Sébastien Lareau	6	6
(United States) Hugo Armando	4	3

=== Twelfth qualifier ===
First round
12	(Germany) Jens Knippschild	6	6
(Czech Republic) Radek Štěpánek	4	4
(Venezuela) José de Armas	3	7^{7}	7^{7}
(France) Jean-François Bachelot	6	6^{3}	6^{4}
(Argentina) Mariano Hood	4	3
(Germany) Lars Burgsmüller	6	6
(Israel) Lior Mor	6	3	4
22	(Belgium) Réginald Willems	2	6	6

Second round
12	(Germany) Jens Knippschild	6	6
(Venezuela) José de Armas	1	2
(Germany) Lars Burgsmüller	7	6
22	(Belgium) Réginald Willems	5	4

Qualifying competition
12	(Germany) Jens Knippschild	6	4	6^{2}
(Germany) Lars Burgsmüller	2	6	7^{7}

=== Thirteenth qualifier ===
First round
13	(Netherlands) John van Lottum	6	6
(New Zealand) Mark Nielsen	2	2
(Japan) Gouichi Motomura	6	6
(Italy) Igor Gaudi	1	4
(Belarus) Alexander Shvets	6	2	3
(South Africa) Justin Bower	3	6	6
(Argentina) Cristian Kordasz	3	0
19	(France) Cyril Saulnier	6	6

Second round
13	(Netherlands) John van Lottum	6	1	7
(Japan) Gouichi Motomura	4	6	5
(South Africa) Justin Bower	1	6^{4}
19	(France) Cyril Saulnier	6	7^{7}

Qualifying competition
13	(Netherlands) John van Lottum	6^{5}	4
19	(France) Cyril Saulnier	7^{7}	6

=== Fourteenth qualifier ===
First round
14	(Chile) Fernando González	7	4
(Pakistan) Aisam-ul-Haq Qureshi	5	1^{r}
(United States) Michael Joyce	2	6	5
(Italy) Mosé Navarra	6	3	7
(United States) Alex O'Brien	6	7^{8}
(Argentina) Damián Furmanski	3	6^{6}
(Germany) Michael Kohlmann	7	6
20	(Haiti) Ronald Agénor	5	4

Second round
14	(Chile) Fernando González	7^{7}	6
(Italy) Mosé Navarra	6^{4}	4
(United States) Alex O'Brien	7^{7}	6
(Germany) Michael Kohlmann	6^{2}	3

Qualifying competition
14	(Chile) Fernando González	6	4	6
(United States) Alex O'Brien	4	6	2

=== Fifteenth qualifier ===
First round
15	(France) Michaël Llodra	4	3
(Israel) Nir Welgreen	6	6
(Austria) Julian Knowle	3	1
(United States) Michael Sell	6	6
(Germany) Björn Phau	6	6
(Argentina) Rodrigo Cerdera	2	2
(France) Olivier Patience	6^{3}	4
17	(Netherlands) Jan Siemerink	7^{7}	6

Second round
(Israel) Nir Welgreen	3	7	5
(United States) Michael Sell	6	5	7
(Germany) Björn Phau	7	0	3
17	(Netherlands) Jan Siemerink	5	6	6

Qualifying competition
(United States) Michael Sell	6^{5}	3
17	(Netherlands) Jan Siemerink	7^{7}	6

=== Sixteenth qualifier ===
First round
16	(Argentina) Gastón Etlis	6^{2}	6	4
(United Kingdom) Jamie Delgado	7^{7}	1	6
(Chile) Adrián García	6	6
(Brazil) Alexandre Simoni	2	3
(France) Paul-Henri Mathieu	6	1	4
(Canada) Frédéric Niemeyer	4	6	6
(Spain) Tommy Robredo	3	4
18	(Japan) Takao Suzuki	6	6

Second round
(United Kingdom) Jamie Delgado	7	4	7^{7}
(Chile) Adrián García	5	6	6^{3}
(Canada) Frédéric Niemeyer	6^{6}	5
18	(Japan) Takao Suzuki	7^{8}	7

Qualifying competition
(United Kingdom) Jamie Delgado	6	3	6
18	(Japan) Takao Suzuki	2	6	4
