= 2000 US Open – Women's singles qualifying =

Women's singles qualifying
- 2000 US Open

Events
| Singles | men | women | | boys | girls |
| Doubles | men | women | mixed | boys | girls |
| WC Singles | men | women | quad |
| WC Doubles | men | women | quad |
| Legends | men | women | mixed |

Qualification
| Singles | men | women |
| Doubles | men | women |
- US Open

This article displays the qualifying draw for the Women's singles at the 2000 US Open.

== Seeds ==
1. (Czech Republic) Dája Bedáňová (qualified)
2. (Federal Republic of Yugoslavia) Sandra Načuk (qualifying competition, lucky loser)
3. (Belarus) Nadejda Ostrovskaya (first round)
4. (Canada) Vanessa Webb (qualified)
5. (Australia) Alicia Molik (qualifying competition, lucky loser)
6. (Italy) Francesca Schiavone (qualified)
7. (Germany) Marlene Weingärtner (first round, retired)
8. (Spain) Nuria Llagostera Vives (first round)
9. (Indonesia) Wynne Prakusya (first round)
10. (France) Émilie Loit (second round)
11. (Italy) Gloria Pizzichini (qualified)
12. (Hungary) Petra Mandula (qualified)
13. (Belarus) Tatiana Poutchek (qualifying competition)
14. (Canada) Maureen Drake (first round)
15. (Chinese Taipei) Janet Lee (qualified)
16. (China) Li Na (second round)
17. (Germany) Barbara Rittner (second round)
18. (Australia) Rachel McQuillan (qualified)
19. (Netherlands) Yvette Basting (qualifying competition)
20. (United Kingdom) Louise Latimer (qualifying competition)
21. (Slovakia) Martina Suchá (qualifying competition)
22. (Japan) Yuka Yoshida (first round)
23. (Belgium) Laurence Courtois (qualifying competition)
24. (United Kingdom) Julie Pullin (second round)
25. (Germany) Bianka Lamade (second round)
26. (Argentina) Mariana Díaz Oliva (first round)
27. (Netherlands) Seda Noorlander (first round)
28. (Spain) Gisela Riera (second round)
29. (Colombia) Catalina Castaño (first round)
30. (Slovenia) Tina Križan (first round)
31. (Italy) Francesca Lubiani (qualifying competition)
32. (Denmark) Eva Dyrberg (second round)

== Qualifiers ==
1. (Czech Republic) Dája Bedáňová
2. (Croatia) Mirjana Lučić
3. (Czech Republic) Alena Vašková
4. (Canada) Vanessa Webb
5. (Germany) Angelika Bachmann
6. (Italy) Francesca Schiavone
7. (Tunisia) Selima Sfar
8. (Hungary) Kira Nagy
9. (United States) Jill Craybas
10. (Germany) Gréta Arn
11. (Italy) Gloria Pizzichini
12. (Hungary) Petra Mandula
13. (Australia) Rachel McQuillan
14. (Germany) Miriam Schnitzer
15. (Chinese Taipei) Janet Lee
16. (Slovakia) Ľudmila Cervanová

== Lucky losers ==
1. (Federal Republic of Yugoslavia) Sandra Načuk
2. (Australia) Alicia Molik

== Draw ==
=== First qualifier ===
First round
1 | (Czech Republic) Dája Bedáňová | 7 | 6
(Germany) Sabine Klaschka | 5 | 3
(India) Nirupama Vaidyanathan | 7 | 6
(Austria) Sybille Bammer | 5 | 3
(Russia) Elena Bovina | 6 | 6
WC | (United States) Kristina Kraszewski | 1 | 4
(France) Karolina Jagieniak | 6 | 4 | 2
20 | (United Kingdom) Louise Latimer | 4 | 6 | 6

Second round
1 | (Czech Republic) Dája Bedáňová | 7 | 6
(India) Nirupama Vaidyanathan | 5 | 1
(Russia) Elena Bovina | 4 | 3
20 | (United Kingdom) Louise Latimer | 6 | 6

Qualifying competition
1 | (Czech Republic) Dája Bedáňová | 6 | 6
20 | (United Kingdom) Louise Latimer | 3 | 4

=== Second qualifier ===
First round
2 | (Federal Republic of Yugoslavia) Sandra Načuk | 6 | 6
(Japan) Saori Obata | 3 | 4
(Spain) Rosa María Andrés | 6 | 6
WC | (United States) Ashley Harkleroad | 4 | 4
(Japan) Akiko Morigami | 2 | 4
(Austria) Evelyn Fauth | 6 | 6
(Croatia) Mirjana Lučić | 6 | 6
22 | (Japan) Yuka Yoshida | 4 | 2

Second round
2 | (Federal Republic of Yugoslavia) Sandra Načuk | 6 | 6
(Spain) Rosa María Andrés | 1 | 4
(Austria) Evelyn Fauth | 2 | 6 | 1
(Croatia) Mirjana Lučić | 6 | 3 | 6

Qualifying competition
2 | (Federal Republic of Yugoslavia) Sandra Načuk | 6 | 3 | 3
(Croatia) Mirjana Lučić | 4 | 6 | 6

=== Third qualifier ===
First round
3 | (Belarus) Nadejda Ostrovskaya | 3 | 4
(Slovakia) Janette Husárová | 6 | 6
(Morocco) Bahia Mouhtassine | 2 | 6^{2}
(Czech Republic) Alena Vašková | 6 | 7^{7}
(Czech Republic) Michaela Paštiková | 6 | 6
(Brazil) Miriam D'Agostini | 3 | 2
WC | (United States) Melissa Middleton | 6^{5} | 3
21 | (Slovakia) Martina Suchá | 7^{7} | 6

Second round
(Slovakia) Janette Husárová | 4 | 4
(Czech Republic) Alena Vašková | 6 | 6
(Czech Republic) Michaela Paštiková | 6^{7} | 1
21 | (Slovakia) Martina Suchá | 7^{9} | 6

Qualifying competition
(Czech Republic) Alena Vašková | 6 | 1 | 6
21 | (Slovakia) Martina Suchá | 3 | 6 | 4

=== Fourth qualifier ===
First round
4 | (Canada) Vanessa Webb | 6 | 6
(Germany) Syna Schmidle | 1 | 4
WC | (United States) Jewel Peterson | 2 | 3
(Austria) Melanie Schnell | 6 | 6
(Italy) Laura Dell'Angelo | 1 | 5
(Spain) Eva Bes | 6 | 7
WC | (United States) Bethanie Mattek | 7 | 2 | 2
28 | (Spain) Gisela Riera | 5 | 6 | 6

Second round
4 | (Canada) Vanessa Webb | 7 | 7^{7}
(Austria) Melanie Schnell | 5 | 6^{3}
(Spain) Eva Bes | 7^{10} | 4 | 7
28 | (Spain) Gisela Riera | 6^{8} | 6 | 5

Qualifying competition
4 | (Canada) Vanessa Webb | 6 | 6
(Spain) Eva Bes | 2 | 1

=== Fifth qualifier ===
First round
5 | (Australia) Alicia Molik | 6 | 7
(Slovenia) Petra Rampre | 2 | 5
(Belgium) Daphne van de Zande | 7^{7} | 4 | 7
(Austria) Marion Maruska | 6^{5} | 6 | 5
(Ukraine) Tatiana Kovalchuk | 6 | 3 | 5
(Czech Republic) Eva Martincová | 3 | 6 | 7
(Germany) Angelika Bachmann | 5 | 6 | 6
26 | (Argentina) Mariana Díaz Oliva | 7 | 2 | 3

Second round
5 | (Australia) Alicia Molik | 7 | 7
(Belgium) Daphne van de Zande | 5 | 5
(Czech Republic) Eva Martincová | 4 | 3
(Germany) Angelika Bachmann | 6 | 6

Qualifying competition
5 | (Australia) Alicia Molik | 6 | 4 | 4
(Germany) Angelika Bachmann | 4 | 6 | 6

=== Sixth qualifier ===
First round
6 | (Italy) Francesca Schiavone | 6 | 6
WC | (United States) Candice Fuchs | 0 | 2
(Germany) Magdalena Kučerová | 5 | 3
(Slovenia) Maja Matevžič | 7 | 6
(Germany) Andrea Glass | 6 | 6
(Czech Republic) Radka Pelikánová | 0 | 3
(Italy) Antonella Serra Zanetti | 2 | 1
17 | (Germany) Barbara Rittner | 6 | 6

Second round
6 | (Italy) Francesca Schiavone | 7^{8} | 6
(Slovenia) Maja Matevžič | 6^{6} | 3
(Germany) Andrea Glass | 6 | 6
17 | (Germany) Barbara Rittner | 3 | 4

Qualifying competition
6 | (Italy) Francesca Schiavone | 6 | 7
(Germany) Andrea Glass | 2 | 5

=== Seventh qualifier ===
First round
7 | (Germany) Marlene Weingärtner | 0^{r}
(United States) Jolene Watanabe | 3
(Tunisia) Selima Sfar | 6 | 6
(Spain) Ainhoa Goñi | 1 | 1
(Italy) Germana Di Natale | 3 | 2
(Australia) Amanda Grahame | 6 | 6
(Ukraine) Anna Zaporozhanova | 6 | 6
27 | (Netherlands) Seda Noorlander | 2 | 2

Second round
(United States) Jolene Watanabe | 3 | 6 | 4
(Tunisia) Selima Sfar | 6 | 3 | 6
(Australia) Amanda Grahame | 5 | 2
(Ukraine) Anna Zaporozhanova | 7 | 6

Qualifying competition
(Tunisia) Selima Sfar | 7 | 6
(Ukraine) Anna Zaporozhanova | 5 | 2

=== Eighth qualifier ===
First round
8 | (Spain) Nuria Llagostera | 6^{5} | 6 | 3
(Canada) Renata Kolbovic | 7^{7} | 4 | 6
(United Kingdom) Lucie Ahl | 0 | 4
(Venezuela) Milagros Sequera | 6 | 6
(South Korea) Kim Eun-ha | 3 | 3
(Czech Republic) Libuše Průšová | 6 | 6
(Hungary) Kira Nagy | 6 | 6
29 | (Colombia) Catalina Castaño | 2 | 1

Second round
(Canada) Renata Kolbovic | 3 | 6^{6}
(Venezuela) Milagros Sequera | 6 | 7^{8}
(Czech Republic) Libuše Průšová | 1 | 4
(Hungary) Kira Nagy | 6 | 6

Qualifying competition
(Venezuela) Milagros Sequera | 2 | 4
(Hungary) Kira Nagy | 6 | 6

=== Ninth qualifier ===
First round
9 | (Indonesia) Wynne Prakusya | 3 | 7 | 1
(Italy) Adriana Serra Zanetti | 6 | 5 | 6
(Germany) Mia Buric | 4 | 0
(United States) Jill Craybas | 6 | 6
(Canada) Marie-Ève Pelletier | 6^{1} | 3
(United States) Samantha Reeves | 7^{7} | 6
(Spain) Conchita Martínez Granados | 3 | 3
25 | (Germany) Bianka Lamade | 6 | 6

Second round
(Italy) Adriana Serra Zanetti | 2 | 3
(United States) Jill Craybas | 6 | 6
(United States) Samantha Reeves | 7 | 6
25 | (Germany) Bianka Lamade | 5 | 2

Qualifying competition
(United States) Jill Craybas | 6 | 1 | 6
(United States) Samantha Reeves | 2 | 6 | 4

=== Tenth qualifier ===
First round
10 | (France) Émilie Loit | 6^{3} | 6 | 6
(Spain) Lourdes Domínguez Lino | 7^{7} | 1 | 4
(Israel) Hila Rosen | 5 | 0
(Germany) Gréta Arn | 7 | 6
(Slovenia) Tina Hergold | 6 | 5 | 6
(Japan) Haruka Inoue | 2 | 7 | 2
(Japan) Nana Miyagi | 3 | 6 | 6
30 | (Slovenia) Tina Križan | 6 | 3 | 2

Second round
10 | (France) Émilie Loit | 1 | 3
(Germany) Gréta Arn | 6 | 6
(Slovenia) Tina Hergold | 6 | 7
(Japan) Nana Miyagi | 2 | 5

Qualifying competition
(Germany) Gréta Arn | 6 | 7^{7}
(Slovenia) Tina Hergold | 1 | 6^{2}

=== Eleventh qualifier ===
First round
11 | (Italy) Gloria Pizzichini | 6 | 6
(Germany) Marketa Kochta | 0 | 1
WC | (United States) Sarah Taylor | 6^{3} | 7^{7} | 1
(Australia) Bryanne Stewart | 7^{7} | 6^{2} | 6
(South Africa) Surina De Beer | 3 | 6^{6}
(United Kingdom) Jo Ward | 6 | 7^{8}
(Bulgaria) Desislava Topalova | 3 | 2
31 | (Italy) Francesca Lubiani | 6 | 6

Second round
11 | (Italy) Gloria Pizzichini | 6 | 6
(Australia) Bryanne Stewart | 1 | 1
(United Kingdom) Jo Ward | 1 | 3
31 | (Italy) Francesca Lubiani | 6 | 6

Qualifying competition
11 | (Italy) Gloria Pizzichini | 6 | 6
31 | (Italy) Francesca Lubiani | 0 | 3

=== Twelfth qualifier ===
First round
12 | (Hungary) Petra Mandula | 3 | 6 | 6
(Kazakhstan) Irina Selyutina | 6 | 1 | 4
(Spain) María José Martínez | 6 | 5 | 7
(United States) Jane Chi | 3 | 7 | 5
(Germany) Anca Barna | 1 | 1
(France) Alexandra Fusai | 6 | 6
(France) Sophie Georges | 2 | 4
24 | (United Kingdom) Julie Pullin | 6 | 6

Second round
12 | (Hungary) Petra Mandula | 6 | 4 | 6
(Spain) María José Martínez | 3 | 6 | 4
(Germany) Anca Barna | 7 | 6
24 | (United Kingdom) Julie Pullin | 5 | 0

Qualifying competition
12 | (Hungary) Petra Mandula | 2 | 7 | 6
(Germany) Anca Barna | 6 | 5 | 0

=== Thirteenth qualifier ===
First round
13 | (Belarus) Tatiana Poutchek | 6 | 6
(Germany) Adriana Barna | 1 | 3
(Israel) Tzipora Obziler | 7 | 4 | 1
(Australia) Annabel Ellwood | 5 | 6 | 6
(Australia) Lisa McShea | 3 | 6 | 7^{7}
WC | (United States) Marlene Mejia | 6 | 3 | 6^{1}
(Czech Republic) Lenka Němečková | 4 | 4
18 | (Australia) Rachel McQuillan | 6 | 6

Second round
13 | (Belarus) Tatiana Poutchek | 6 | 6
(Australia) Annabel Ellwood | 1 | 2
(Australia) Lisa McShea | 2 | 6^{3}
18 | (Australia) Rachel McQuillan | 6 | 7^{7}

Qualifying competition
13 | (Belarus) Tatiana Poutchek | 6 | 4 | 6^{7}
18 | (Australia) Rachel McQuillan | 4 | 6 | 7^{9}

=== Fourteenth qualifier ===
First round
14 | (Canada) Maureen Drake | 3 | 1
(Slovakia) Daniela Hantuchová | 6 | 6
(South Korea) Cho Yoon-jeong | 4 | 6 | 6^{9}
(Germany) Miriam Schnitzer | 6 | 4 | 7^{11}
(France) Virginie Razzano | 6 | 6
(France) Laurence Andretto | 2 | 3
(Bulgaria) Antoaneta Pandjerova | 2 | 5
32 | (Denmark) Eva Dyrberg | 6 | 7

Second round
(Slovakia) Daniela Hantuchová | 3 | 3
(Germany) Miriam Schnitzer | 6 | 6
(France) Virginie Razzano | 6 | 6
32 | (Denmark) Eva Dyrberg | 4 | 4

Qualifying competition
(Germany) Miriam Schnitzer | 7 | 6
(France) Virginie Razzano | 5 | 3

=== Fifteenth qualifier ===
First round
15 | (Chinese Taipei) Janet Lee | 6 | 7^{7}
(Czech Republic) Eva Krejčová | 3 | 6^{3}
(Poland) Anna Żarska | 7 | 5 | 6
WC | (United States) Julie Thu | 5 | 7 | 4
(United States) Linda Wild | 4 | 6 | 6
(Italy) Alice Canepa | 6 | 1 | 4
(Australia) Evie Dominikovic | 3 | 4
19 | (Netherlands) Yvette Basting | 6 | 6

Second round
15 | (Chinese Taipei) Janet Lee | 6 | 3 | 6
(Poland) Anna Żarska | 0 | 6 | 0
(United States) Linda Wild | 2 | 7 | 2
19 | (Netherlands) Yvette Basting | 6 | 5 | 6

Qualifying competition
15 | (Chinese Taipei) Janet Lee | 2 | 7 | 6
19 | (Netherlands) Yvette Basting | 6 | 5 | 3

=== Sixteenth qualifier ===
First round
16 | (China) Li Na | 7 | 4 | 6
(United States) Lindsay Lee | 5 | 6 | 3
(Germany) Vanessa Henke | 4 | 6^{3}
(Slovakia) Ľudmila Cervanová | 6 | 7^{7}
(Madagascar) Dally Randriantefy | 4 | 1
(United States) Karin Miller | 6 | 6
(Spain) Paula Hermida | 3 | 2
23 | (Belgium) Laurence Courtois | 6 | 6

Second round
16 | (China) Li Na | 2 | 6 | 3
(Slovakia) Ľudmila Cervanová | 6 | 2 | 6
(United States) Karin Miller | 4 | 2
23 | (Belgium) Laurence Courtois | 6 | 6

Qualifying competition
(Slovakia) Ľudmila Cervanová | 4 | 6 | 7
23 | (Belgium) Laurence Courtois | 6 | 4 | 5
