= 2000 US Open – Women's doubles qualifying =

Women's doubles qualifying
- 2000 US Open

Events
Singles	men	women		boys	girls
Doubles	men	women	mixed	boys	girls
WC Singles	men	women	quad
WC Doubles	men	women	quad
Legends	men	women	mixed

Qualification
Singles	men	women
Doubles	men	women
- US Open

== Seeds ==
1. (United States) Dawn Buth / (Slovenia) Petra Rampre (first round)
2. (Argentina) Mariana Díaz Oliva / (Spain) Lourdes Domínguez Lino (qualifying competition, lucky losers)
3. (South Africa) Kim Grant / (United States) Lindsay Lee-Waters (first round)
4. (Germany) Angelika Bachmann / (Germany) Andrea Glass (qualified)
5. (Canada) Renata Kolbovic / (United States) Julie Thu (first round)
6. (Brazil) Joana Cortez / (Brazil) Miriam D'Agostini (first round)
7. (Bulgaria) Magdalena Maleeva / (Slovakia) Henrieta Nagyová (qualified)
8. (Hungary) Virág Csurgó / (Hungary) Petra Mandula (qualifying competition)

== Qualifiers ==
1. (Czech Republic) Eva Martincová / (Czech Republic) Michaela Paštiková
2. (Bulgaria) Magdalena Maleeva / (Slovakia) Henrieta Nagyová
3. (Slovenia) Maja Matevžič / (Germany) Syna Schmidle
4. (Germany) Angelika Bachmann / (Germany) Andrea Glass

== Lucky losers ==
1. (Argentina) Mariana Díaz Oliva / (Spain) Lourdes Domínguez Lino

== Draw ==
=== First qualifier ===
First round
1	(United States) Dawn Buth (Slovenia) Petra Rampre	7^{7}	1	2
(Czech Republic) Eva Martincová (Czech Republic) Michaela Paštiková	6^{4}	6	6
(Australia) Evie Dominikovic (South Korea) Kim Eun-ha	4	6	7^{7}
5	(Canada) Renata Kolbovic (United States) Julie Thu	6	2	6^{5}

Qualifying competition
(Czech Republic) Eva Martincová (Czech Republic) Michaela Paštiková	6	5	6
(Australia) Evie Dominikovic (South Korea) Kim Eun-ha	2	7	4

=== Second qualifier ===
First round
2	(Argentina) Mariana Díaz Oliva (Spain) Lourdes Domínguez Lino	4	6	7^{7}
WC	(United States) Ashley Harkleroad (United States) Bethanie Mattek	6	4	6^{4}
(South Africa) Joannette Kruger (Austria) Marion Maruska	2	3
7	(Bulgaria) Magdalena Maleeva (Slovakia) Henrieta Nagyová	6	6

Qualifying competition
2	(Argentina) Mariana Díaz Oliva (Spain) Lourdes Domínguez Lino	2	6^{3}
7	(Bulgaria) Magdalena Maleeva (Slovakia) Henrieta Nagyová	6	7^{7}

=== Third qualifier ===
First round
3	(South Africa) Kim Grant (United States) Lindsay Lee-Waters	3	6^{3}
(Japan) Maiko Inoue (Spain) María Sánchez Lorenzo	6	7^{7}
(Slovenia) Maja Matevžič (Germany) Syna Schmidle	6	7^{7}
6	(Brazil) Joana Cortez (Brazil) Miriam D'Agostini	4	6^{3}

Qualifying competition
(Japan) Maiko Inoue (Spain) María Sánchez Lorenzo	6	4	3
(Slovenia) Maja Matevžič (Germany) Syna Schmidle	4	6	6

=== Fourth qualifier ===
First round
4	(Germany) Angelika Bachmann (Germany) Andrea Glass	6	6
WC	(United States) Lauren Kalvaria (United States) Gabriela Lastra	1	4
WC	(United States) Jennifer Hopkins (United States) Holly Parkinson	7^{9}	4	4
8	(Hungary) Virág Csurgó (Hungary) Petra Mandula	6^{7}	6	6

Qualifying competition
4	(Germany) Angelika Bachmann (Germany) Andrea Glass	6	6
8	(Hungary) Virág Csurgó (Hungary) Petra Mandula	1	4
