= 2000 US Open – Men's doubles qualifying =

Men's doubles qualifying
- 2000 US Open

Events
Singles	men	women		boys	girls
Doubles	men	women	mixed	boys	girls
WC Singles	men	women	quad
WC Doubles	men	women	quad
Legends	men	women	mixed

Qualification
Singles	men	women
Doubles	men	women
- US Open

This article displays the qualifying draw for the Men's doubles at the 2000 US Open.

== Seeds ==
1. (Brazil) Daniel Melo / (Brazil) Alexandre Simoni (first round)
2. (Czech Republic) Petr Kovačka / (Czech Republic) Pavel Kudrnáč (qualified)
3. (Australia) Paul Hanley / (Australia) Nathan Healey (qualified)
4. (United States) Adam Peterson / (United Kingdom) Kyle Spencer (first round)
5. (Australia) Lee Pearson / (Australia) Grant Silcock (first round)
6. (Germany) Karsten Braasch / (Germany) Lars Burgsmüller (qualified)
7. (Mexico) Alejandro Hernández / (Canada) Jocelyn Robichaud (qualifying competition)
8. (Australia) Tim Crichton / (Australia) Ashley Fisher (qualifying competition)

== Qualifiers ==
1. (Switzerland) Lorenzo Manta / (Italy) Laurence Tieleman
2. (Czech Republic) Petr Kovačka / (Czech Republic) Pavel Kudrnáč
3. (Australia) Paul Hanley / (Australia) Nathan Healey
4. (Germany) Karsten Braasch / (Germany) Lars Burgsmüller

== Draw ==
=== First qualifier ===
First round
1	(Brazil) Daniel Melo (Brazil) Alexandre Simoni	4	6	6^{2}
(Switzerland) Lorenzo Manta (Italy) Laurence Tieleman	6	4	7^{7}
WC	(United States) Edward Carter (United States) Brian Vahaly	3	4
8	(Australia) Tim Crichton (Australia) Ashley Fisher	6	6

Qualifying competition
(Switzerland) Lorenzo Manta (Italy) Laurence Tieleman	6	6
8	(Australia) Tim Crichton (Australia) Ashley Fisher	3	3

=== Second qualifier ===
First round
2	(Czech Republic) Petr Kovačka (Czech Republic) Pavel Kudrnáč	4	6	7^{7}
(Israel) Noam Behr (Finland) Tuomas Ketola	6	4	6^{5}
WC	(United States) Brandon Hawk (United States) Jeff Williams	6^{4}	6^{4}
7	(Mexico) Alejandro Hernández (Canada) Jocelyn Robichaud	7^{7}	7^{7}

Qualifying competition
2	(Czech Republic) Petr Kovačka (Czech Republic) Pavel Kudrnáč	7^{7}	6
7	(Mexico) Alejandro Hernández (Canada) Jocelyn Robichaud	6^{2}	1

=== Third qualifier ===
First round
3	(Australia) Paul Hanley (Australia) Nathan Healey	7^{7}	7^{7}
(Australia) Dejan Petrović (Federal Republic of Yugoslavia) Dušan Vemić	6^{3}	6^{5}
WC	(United States) Zack Fleishman (United States) Kelly Gullett	5	6	6
5	(Australia) Lee Pearson (Australia) Grant Silcock	7	4	4

Qualifying competition
3	(Australia) Paul Hanley (Australia) Nathan Healey	7^{7}	7^{7}
WC	(United States) Zack Fleishman (United States) Kelly Gullett	6^{4}	6^{5}

=== Fourth qualifier ===
First round
4	(United States) Adam Peterson (United Kingdom) Kyle Spencer	7^{7}	4	0
(The Bahamas) Mark Merklein (South Africa) Paul Rosner	6^{4}	6	6
PR	(United States) David DiLucia (United States) Michael Sell	7	2	6^{3}
6	(Germany) Karsten Braasch (Germany) Lars Burgsmüller	5	6	7^{7}

Qualifying competition
(The Bahamas) Mark Merklein (South Africa) Paul Rosner	6^{4}	2
6	(Germany) Karsten Braasch (Germany) Lars Burgsmüller	7^{7}	6
