= 2000 in tennis =

This page covers all the important events in the sport of tennis in 2000. Primarily, it provides the results of notable tournaments throughout the year on both the ATP and WTA Tours, the Davis Cup, and the Fed Cup.

== ITF ==
=== Grand Slam events ===
Category	Championship	Champions	Finalists	Score in the final
Men's singles	Australian Open	(United States) Andre Agassi	(Russia) Yevgeny Kafelnikov	3–6, 6–3, 6–2, 6–4
Men's singles	French Open	(Brazil) Gustavo Kuerten	(Sweden) Magnus Norman	6–2, 6–3, 2–6, 7–6^{(8–6)}
Men's singles	Wimbledon	(United States) Pete Sampras	(Australia) Patrick Rafter	6–7^{(10–12)}, 7–6^{(7–5)}, 6–4, 6–2
Men's singles	US Open	(Russia) Marat Safin	(United States) Pete Sampras	6–4, 6–3, 6–3

Category	Championship	Champions	Finalists	Score in the final
Women's singles	Australian Open	(United States) Lindsay Davenport	(Switzerland) Martina Hingis	6–1, 7–5
Women's singles	French Open	(France) Mary Pierce	(Spain) Conchita Martínez	6–2, 7–5
Women's singles	Wimbledon	(United States) Venus Williams	(United States) Lindsay Davenport	6–3, 7–6^{(7–3)}
Women's singles	US Open	(United States) Venus Williams	(United States) Lindsay Davenport	6–4, 7–5

Category	Championship	Champions	Finalists	Score in the final
Men's doubles	Australian Open	(South Africa) Ellis Ferreira (United States) Rick Leach	(Zimbabwe) Wayne Black (Australia) Andrew Kratzmann	6–4, 3–6, 6–3, 3–6, 18–16
Men's doubles	French Open	(Australia) Todd Woodbridge (Australia) Mark Woodforde	(Netherlands) Paul Haarhuis (Australia) Sandon Stolle	7–6^{(9–7)}, 6–4
Men's doubles	Wimbledon	(Australia) Todd Woodbridge (Australia) Mark Woodforde	(Netherlands) Paul Haarhuis (Australia) Sandon Stolle	6–3, 6–4, 6–1
Men's doubles	US Open	(Australia) Lleyton Hewitt (Belarus) Max Mirnyi	(South Africa) Ellis Ferreira (United States) Rick Leach	6–4, 5–7, 7–6^{(7–5)}

Category	Championship	Champions	Finalists	Score in the final
Women's doubles	Australian Open	(United States) Lisa Raymond (Australia) Rennae Stubbs	(Switzerland) Martina Hingis (France) Mary Pierce	6–4, 5–7, 6–4
Women's doubles	French Open	(Switzerland) Martina Hingis (France) Mary Pierce	(Spain) Virginia Ruano (Argentina) Paola Suárez	6–2, 6–4
Women's doubles	Wimbledon	(United States) Serena Williams (United States) Venus Williams	(France) Julie Halard-Decugis (Japan) Ai Sugiyama	6–3, 6–2
Women's doubles	US Open	(France) Julie Halard-Decugis (Japan) Ai Sugiyama	(Zimbabwe) Cara Black (Russia) Elena Likhovtseva	6–0, 1–6, 6–1

Category	Championship	Champions	Finalists	Score in the final
Mixed doubles	Australian Open	(United States) Jared Palmer (Australia) Rennae Stubbs	(Spain) Arantxa Sánchez (Australia) Todd Woodbridge	7–5, 7–6^{(7–3)}
Mixed doubles	French Open	(South Africa) David Adams (South Africa) Mariaan de Swardt	(Australia) Rennae Stubbs (Australia) Todd Woodbridge	6–3, 3–6, 6–3
Mixed doubles	Wimbledon	(United States) Donald Johnson (United States) Kimberly Po	(Belgium) Kim Clijsters (Australia) Lleyton Hewitt	6–4, 7–6^{(7–3)}
Mixed doubles	US Open	(United States) Jared Palmer (Spain) Arantxa Sánchez	(Russia) Anna Kournikova (Belarus) Max Mirnyi	6–4, 6–3

=== Summer Olympics ===
Category	Gold medalists	Silver medalists	Bronze medalists
Men's singles	(Russia) Yevgeny Kafelnikov	(Germany) Tommy Haas	(France) Arnaud Di Pasquale

Category	Gold medalists	Silver medalists	Bronze medalists
Women's singles	(United States) Venus Williams	(Russia) Elena Dementieva	(United States) Monica Seles

Category	Gold medalists	Silver medalists	Bronze medalists
Men's doubles	(Canada) Sébastien Lareau (Canada) Daniel Nestor	(Australia) Todd Woodbridge (Australia) Mark Woodforde	(Spain) Àlex Corretja (Spain) Albert Costa

Category	Gold medalists	Silver medalists	Bronze medalists
Women's doubles	(United States) Serena Williams (United States) Venus Williams	(Netherlands) Kristie Boogert (Netherlands) Miriam Oremans	(Belgium) Els Callens (Belgium) Dominique Van Roost

=== Davis Cup ===
2000 Davis Cup Champions
(Spain)
Spain
1st title

Spain
3
Palau Sant Jordi, Barcelona, Spain
8–10 December
Clay (indoors)

Australia
1

			1	2	3	4	5
1	(Spain) (Australia)	Albert Costa; Lleyton Hewitt	6; 3	1; 6	6; 2	4; 6	4; 6
2	(Spain) (Australia)	Juan Carlos Ferrero; Pat Rafter	6^{4} 7^{7}	7^{7} 6^{2}	6; 2	3; 1		retired
3	(Spain) (Australia)	Joan Balcells / Àlex Corretja; Sandon Stolle / Mark Woodforde	6; 4	6; 4	6; 4
4	(Spain) (Australia)	Juan Carlos Ferrero; Lleyton Hewitt	6; 2	7^{7} 6^{5}	4; 6	6; 4
5	(Spain) (Australia)	Albert Costa; Pat Rafter						not played

=== Fed Cup ===
2000 Fed Cup Champions
(United States)
United States
17th title

United States
5
Mandalay Bay Events Center, Las Vegas, United States
24–25 November
Supreme carpet (indoors)

Spain
0

			1	2	3
1	(United States) (Spain)	Monica Seles; Conchita Martínez	6; 2	6; 3
2	(United States) (Spain)	Lindsay Davenport; Arantxa Sánchez Vicario	6; 2	1; 6	6; 3
3	(United States) (Spain)	Lindsay Davenport; Conchita Martínez	6; 1	6; 2
4	(United States) (Spain)	Jennifer Capriati; Arantxa Sánchez Vicario	6; 1	1; 0		retired
5	(United States) (Spain)	Jennifer Capriati / Lisa Raymond; Virginia Ruano Pascual / Magüi Serna	4; 6	6; 4	6; 2

=== Hopman Cup ===
2000 Hopman Cup Champions
(South Africa)
South Africa
1st title

South Africa
3
Burswood Entertainment Complex, Perth, Australia
8 January
Hard (indoors)

Thailand
0

			1	2	3
1	(South Africa) (Thailand)	Amanda Coetzer; Tamarine Tanasugarn	3; 6	6; 4	6; 4
2	(South Africa) (Thailand)	Wayne Ferreira; Paradorn Srichaphan	7; 6	6; 3
3	(South Africa) (Thailand)	Amanda Coetzer / Wayne Ferreira; Tamarine Tanasugarn / Paradorn Srichaphan	8; 1

=== ITF Tour ===
- Men's circuit
- Women's circuit

== ATP/WTA ==
=== Year-End Championships ===
Category	Championship	Champions	Finalists	Score in the final
Men's singles	Lisbon	(Brazil) Gustavo Kuerten	(United States) Andre Agassi	6–4, 6–4, 6–4

Category	Championship	Champions	Finalists	Score in the final
Women's singles	New York	(Switzerland) Martina Hingis	(United States) Monica Seles	6–7^{(5–7)}, 6–4, 6–4

Category	Championship	Champions	Finalists	Score in the final
Men's doubles	Bangalore	(United States) Donald Johnson (South Africa) Piet Norval	(India) Mahesh Bhupathi (India) Leander Paes	7–6^{(10–8)}, 6–3, 6–4

Category	Championship	Champions	Finalists	Score in the final
Women's singles	New York	(Switzerland) Martina Hingis (Russia) Anna Kournikova	(United States) Nicole Arendt (Netherlands) Manon Bollegraf	6–2, 6–3

=== Masters Series/Tier I ===
Men's singles

Championship	Champions	Finalists	Score in the final
Indian Wells	(Spain) Àlex Corretja	(Sweden) Thomas Enqvist	6–4, 6–4, 6–3
Key Biscane	(United States) Pete Sampras	(Brazil) Gustavo Kuerten	6–1, 6–7^{(2–7)}, 7–6^{(7–5)}, 7–6^{(10–8)}
Monte Carlo	(France) Cédric Pioline	(Slovakia) Dominik Hrbatý	6–4, 7–6^{(7–3)}, 7–6^{(8–6)}
Rome	(Sweden) Magnus Norman	(Brazil) Gustavo Kuerten	6–3, 4–6, 6–4, 6–4
Hamburg	(Brazil) Gustavo Kuerten	(Russia) Marat Safin	6–4, 5–7, 6–4, 5–7, 7–6^{(7–3)}
Canada (Toronto)	(Russia) Marat Safin	(Israel) Harel Levy	6–2, 6–3
Cincinnati	(Sweden) Thomas Enqvist	(United Kingdom) Tim Henman	7–6^{(7–5)}, 6–4
Stuttgart	(South Africa) Wayne Ferreira	(Australia) Lleyton Hewitt	7–6^{(8–6)}, 3–6, 6–7^{(5–7)}, 7–6^{(7–2)}, 6–2
Paris	(Russia) Marat Safin	(Russia) Yevgeny Kafelnikov	3–6, 7–6^{(9–7)}, 6–4, 3–6, 7–6^{(10–8)}

Women's singles

Championship	Champions	Finalists	Score in the final
Tokyo	(Switzerland) Martina Hingis	(France) Sandrine Testud	6–3, 7–5
Indian Wells	(United States) Lindsay Davenport	(Switzerland) Martina Hingis	4–6, 6–4, 6–0
Miami	(Switzerland) Martina Hingis	(United States) Lindsay Davenport	6–3, 6–2
Hilton Head	(France) Mary Pierce	(Spain) Arantxa Sánchez	6–1, 6–0
Berlin	(Spain) Conchita Martínez	(South Africa) Amanda Coetzer	6–1, 6–2
Rome	(United States) Monica Seles	(France) Amélie Mauresmo	6–2, 7–6^{(7–4)}
Canada (Montréal)	(Switzerland) Martina Hingis	(United States) Serena Williams	0–6, 6–3, 3–0 retired
Zurich	(Switzerland) Martina Hingis	(United States) Lindsay Davenport	6–4, 4–6, 7–5
Moscow	(Switzerland) Martina Hingis	(Russia) Anna Kournikova	6–3, 6–1

Men's doubles

Championship	Champions	Finalists	Score in the final
Indian Wells	(United States) Alex O'Brien (United States) Jared Palmer	(Netherlands) Paul Haarhuis (Australia) Sandon Stolle	6–4, 7–6^{(7–5)}
Key Biscane	(Australia) Todd Woodbridge (Australia) Mark Woodforde	(Czech Republic) Martin Damm (Slovakia) Dominik Hrbatý	6–3, 6–4
Monte Carlo	(South Africa) Wayne Ferreira (Russia) Yevgeny Kafelnikov	(Netherlands) Paul Haarhuis (Australia) Sandon Stolle	6–3, 2–6, 6–1
Rome	(Czech Republic) Martin Damm (Slovakia) Dominik Hrbatý	(South Africa) Wayne Ferreira (Russia) Yevgeny Kafelnikov	6–4, 3–6, 6–4
Hamburg	(Australia) Todd Woodbridge (Australia) Mark Woodforde	(Australia) Wayne Arthurs (Australia) Sandon Stolle	6–7, 6–4, 6–3
Canada (Toronto)	(Canada) Sébastien Lareau (Canada) Daniel Nestor	(Australia) Joshua Eagle (United States) Andrew Florent	6–3, 7–6^{(7–3)}
Cincinnati	(Australia) Mark Woodforde (Australia) Todd Woodbridge	(South Africa) Ellis Ferreira (United States) Rick Leach	7–6^{(8–6)}, 6–4
Stuttgart	(Czech Republic) Jiří Novák (Czech Republic) David Rikl	(United States) Donald Johnson (South Africa) Piet Norval	3–6, 6–3, 6–4
Paris	(Sweden) Nicklas Kulti (Belarus) Max Mirnyi	(Netherlands) Paul Haarhuis (Canada) Daniel Nestor	6–4, 7–5

Women's doubles

Championship	Champions	Finalists	Score in the final
Tokyo	(Switzerland) Martina Hingis (France) Mary Pierce	(France) Alexandra Fusai (France) Nathalie Tauziat	6–4, 6–1
Indian Wells	(United States) Lindsay Davenport (United States) Corina Morariu	(Russia) Anna Kournikova (Belarus) Natasha Zvereva	6–2, 6–3
Miami	(France) Julie Halard-Decugis (Japan) Ai Sugiyama	(United States) Nicole Arendt (Netherlands) Manon Bollegraf	4–6, 7–5, 6–4
Hilton Head	(Spain) Virginia Ruano (Argentina) Paola Suárez	(Spain) Conchita Martínez (Argentina) Patricia Tarabini	7–5, 6–3
Berlin	(Spain) Conchita Martínez (Spain) Arantxa Sánchez	(South Africa) Amanda Coetzer (United States) Corina Morariu	3–6, 6–2, 7–6^{(9–7)}
Rome	(United States) Lisa Raymond (Australia) Rennae Stubbs	(Spain) Arantxa Sánchez (Spain) Magüi Serna	6–3, 4–6, 6–2
Canada (Montréal)	(Switzerland) Martina Hingis (France) Nathalie Tauziat	(France) Julie Halard-Decugis (Japan) Ai Sugiyama	6–3, 3–6, 6–4
Zurich	(Switzerland) Martina Hingis (Russia) Anna Kournikova	(United States) Kimberly Po (France) Anne-Gaëlle Sidot	6–3, 6–4
Moscow	(France) Julie Halard-Decugis (Japan) Ai Sugiyama	(Switzerland) Martina Hingis (Russia) Anna Kournikova	4–6, 6–4, 7–6(5)

=== Year-End Top 10 ===
Men's singles

#	Player	Points
1	(Brazil) Gustavo Kuerten	4,195
2	(Russia) Marat Safin	4,120
3	(United States) Pete Sampras	3,385
4	(Sweden) Magnus Norman	3,110
5	(Russia) Yevgeny Kafelnikov	2,935
6	(United States) Andre Agassi	2,765
7	(Spain) Alex Corretja	2,475
9	(Sweden) Thomas Enqvist	2,210
10	(United Kingdom) Tim Henman	2,020

== Tennis Hall of Fame ==
Class	Inductees	Category
Class of 2000	(Australia) Mal Anderson	Player
Class of 2000	(United States) Robert J. Kelleher	Contributor
Class of 2000	(United States) Martina Navratilova	Player
