= Cédric Kauffmann =

French tennis player

- Country (sports): France
- Born: 1 March 1976 (age 49)
- Plays: Right-handed
- Prize money: $119,891

Singles
- Career record: 0–3
- Career titles: 0
- Highest ranking: No. 195 (13 August 2001)

Grand Slam singles results
- French Open: 1R (2001)
- US Open: 1R (2000)

Doubles
- Career record: 0–1
- Career titles: 0
- Highest ranking: No. 210 (12 February 2001)

Grand Slam doubles results
- French Open: 1R (2001)

Cédric Kauffmann (French pronunciation: [sedʁik kofman]; born 1 March 1976) is a former professional tennis player from France, most notable for an encounter with Pete Sampras in 2001.

== Career ==
Kauffmann played collegiate tennis at the University of Kentucky, where he now is the head coach of the Men's Team. He was an All-American every year from 1996 to 1998.

In the 2000 US Open he qualified for the main draw and lost to countryman Arnaud Di Pasquale in the opening round.

His most memorable match came when, ranked 250th in the world, he came close to upsetting Peter Sampras 6–3, 4–6, 6–2, 3–6, 8–6 in first round of the 2001 French Open. In the fifth set he was unable to convert three match points, eventually losing 6–8. He also competed in the men's doubles at the same event, with Jean-Francois Bachelot, but again exited in the first round

He is married and has 4 kids.

== Challenger titles ==
=== Singles: (1) ===
| No. | Year | Tournament | Surface | Opponent | Score |
|---|---|---|---|---|---|
| 1. | 2001 | Binghamton, United States | Hard | (Israel) Noam Behr | 7–5, 6–1 |

=== Doubles: (2) ===
| No. | Year | Tournament | Surface | Partner | Opponents | Score |
|---|---|---|---|---|---|---|
| 1. | 2000 | Ahmedabad, India | Hard | (India) Fazaluddin Syed | (South Africa) Justin Bower (South Africa) Damien Roberts | 3–6, 6–4, 6–4 |
| 2. | 2002 | Osaka, Japan | Hard | (Slovakia) Karol Beck | (Italy) Laurence Tieleman (Netherlands) John van Lottum | 7–5, 6–1 |
