= Petr Kralert =

Czech tennis player (born 1979)

- Country (sports): Czech Republic
- Residence: London, England
- Born: 20 October 1979 (age 45); Prague, Czech Republic
- Height: 1.88 m (6 ft 2 in)
- Turned pro: 1997
- Retired: 2007
- Plays: Right-handed (two-handed backhand)
- Prize money: $231,463

Singles
- Career record: 2–5
- Career titles: 0
- Highest ranking: No. 138 (19 June 2000)

Grand Slam singles results
- Australian Open: Q3 (2002, 2004)
- French Open: Q3 (2000)
- Wimbledon: Q2 (2004)
- US Open: 2R (2000)

Doubles
- Career record: 0–0
- Career titles: 0
- Highest ranking: No. 321 (25 October 2004)

Petr Kralert (born 20 October 1979) is a former professional tennis player from the Czech Republic.

== Tennis career ==
=== Juniors ===
Kralert had a good year as a junior in 1996, when he won the Banana Bowl; was a doubles champion at the Orange Bowl, partnering countryman Robin Vik; and bagelled Roger Federer when he beat the future World No. 1 in the Sunshine Cup. He reached as high as No. 19 in the junior world singles rankings (and No. 16 in doubles).

=== Pro tour ===
In 1999 he made an appearance for the Czech Republic Davis Cup team, in a World Group play-off tie against Uzbekistan. He defeated Oleg Ogorodov in the fourth rubber, to help the Czechs secure a clean sweep.

Kralert qualified for his only Grand Slam tournament in 2000, at the US Open. He had a win over Spain's David Sánchez in the first round, then lost in the second round to Agustín Calleri.

== Challenger titles ==
=== Singles: (2) ===
No.	Year	Tournament	Surface	Opponent	Score
1.	1999	Granby, Canada	Hard	(The Bahamas) Mark Knowles	6–4, 6–7^{(2–7)}, 7–6^{(9–7)}
2.	2001	Ho Chi Minh City, Vietnam	Hard	(Indonesia) Suwandi Suwandi	6–2, 2–6, 6–4
