= Elena Likhovtseva =

Russian tennis player

Elena Likhovtseva Елена Лиховцева
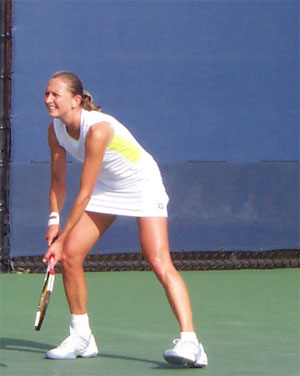
- Likhovtseva in 2006
- Country (sports): USSR (1991), (Commonwealth of Independent States) CIS (1992), Kazakhstan (1993–94), Russia (since Jul 1995)
- Residence: Moscow, Russia
- Born: 8 September 1975 (age 51) Alma-Ata, Kazakh SSR, Soviet Union
- Height: 1.74 m (5 ft 8 1/2 in)
- Turned pro: 1992
- Retired: (last match 2008)
- Plays: Right (two-handed backhand)
- Prize money: $6,237,555

Singles
- Career record: 433–372
- Career titles: 3
- Highest ranking: No. 15 (25 October 1999)

Grand Slam singles results
- Australian Open: QF (2000)
- French Open: SF (2005)
- Wimbledon: QF (2002)
- US Open: 4R (1994, 1999, 2001, 2003, 2005)

Doubles
- Career record: 526–314
- Career titles: 27
- Highest ranking: No. 3 (27 September 2004)

Grand Slam doubles results
- Australian Open: F (2004)
- French Open: F (2004)
- Wimbledon: SF (2002)
- US Open: F (2000, 2004)

Mixed doubles
- Career titles: 2

Grand Slam mixed doubles results
- Australian Open: W (2007)
- French Open: F (2003, 2006)
- Wimbledon: W (2002)
- US Open: SF (2000)

Elena Alexandrovna Likhovtseva (Елена Александровна Лиховцева; born 8 September 1975) is a Kazakhstani-born Russian former tennis player. She turned professional in January 1992, at the age of 16.

Together with Mahesh Bhupathi, she won the Wimbledon mixed-doubles in 2002 and the Australian Open mixed-doubles championship with Daniel Nestor in 2007. She also was runner-up in a number of other contests, including the 2000 and 2004 US Open – Women's doubles, the French Open mixed doubles in 2003, the Australian Open women's doubles in 2004, the French Open mixed doubles in 2006. In the 2004 Summer Olympics, she won the first round of the women's doubles competition with partner Svetlana Kuznetsova but was defeated in the second.

== Grand Slam performance timelines ==
Key
W	F	SF	QF	#R	RR	Q#	DNQ	A	NH

(W) winner; (F) finalist; (SF) semifinalist; (QF) quarterfinalist; (#R) rounds 4, 3, 2, 1; (RR) round-robin stage; (Q#) qualification round; (DNQ) did not qualify; (A) absent; (NH) not held; (SR) strike rate (events won / competed); (W–L) win–loss record.

=== Singles ===
Tournament	1993	1994	1995	1996	1997	1998	1999	2000	2001	2002	2003	2004	2005	2006	2007	Career W–L
Australian Open	A	3R	1R	4R	1R	3R	3R	QF	1R	1R	1R	3R	3R	2R	1R	18–14
French Open	A	A	2R	3R	2R	3R	3R	1R	1R	3R	1R	2R	SF	1R	2R	17–13
Wimbledon	A	1R	1R	4R	2R	3R	3R	2R	3R	QF	2R	2R	4R	3R	2R	23–14
US Open	2R	4R	1R	3R	3R	1R	4R	3R	4R	2R	4R	1R	4R	3R	2R	26–15
Win–loss	1–1	5–3	1–4	10–4	4–4	6–4	9–4	7–4	5–4	7–4	4–4	4–4	13–4	5–4	3–4	84–56

=== Doubles ===
Tournament	1994	1995	1996	1997	1998	1999	2000	2001	2002	2003	2004	2005	2006	2007	2008	Career W–L
Australian Open	1R	1R	1R	1R	QF	2R	3R	2R	1R	3R	F	2R	QF	1R	A	18–14
French Open	A	2R	2R	3R	3R	QF	1R	3R	3R	SF	F	3R	3R	1R	2R	27–14
Wimbledon	A	1R	2R	2R	3R	2R	1R	2R	SF	3R	QF	QF	3R	QF	A	23–13
US Open	1R	1R	QF	3R	A	1R	F	SF	SF	SF	F	2R	3R	1R	2R	30–13
Win–loss	0–2	1–4	5–4	5–4	7–3	5–4	6–4	8–4	10–4	12–4	18–4	7–4	9–4	3–4	2–1	98–54

=== Mixed doubles ===
Tournament	1997	1998	1999	2000	2001	2002	2003	2004	2005	2006	2007	2008	Career W–L
Australian Open	1R	SF	2R	QF	1R	SF	2R	1R	2R	F	W	A	20–10
French Open	2R	1R	SF	QF	SF	QF	F	1R	1R	F	1R	1R	18–12
Wimbledon	2R	QF	SF	QF	SF	W	2R	QF	3R	QF	SF	A	29–10
US Open	QF	2R	1R	SF	1R	2R	2R	QF	2R	1R	1R	A	10–11

== Grand Slam tournament finals ==
=== Doubles: 4 (4 runner-ups) ===
Result	Year	Championship	Surface	Partner	Opponents	Score
Loss	2000	US Open	Hard	(Zimbabwe) Cara Black	(France) Julie Halard-Decugis (Japan) Ai Sugiyama	0–6, 6–1, 1–6
Loss	2004	Australian Open	Hard	(Russia) Svetlana Kuznetsova	(Spain) Virginia Ruano Pascual (Argentina) Paola Suárez	4–6, 3–6
Loss	2004	French Open	Clay	(Russia) Svetlana Kuznetsova	(Spain) Virginia Ruano Pascual (Argentina) Paola Suárez	0–6, 3–6
Loss	2004	US Open	Hard	(Russia) Svetlana Kuznetsova	(Spain) Virginia Ruano Pascual (Argentina) Paola Suárez	4–6, 5–7

=== Mixed doubles: 5 (2 titles, 3 runner-ups) ===
Result	Year	Championship	Surface	Partner	Opponents	Score
Win	2002	Wimbledon	Grass	(India) Mahesh Bhupathi	(Slovakia) Daniela Hantuchová (Zimbabwe) Kevin Ullyett	6–2, 7–5
Loss	2003	French Open	Clay	(India) Mahesh Bhupathi	(United States) Lisa Raymond (United States) Mike Bryan	3–6, 4–6
Loss	2006	Australian Open	Hard	(Canada) Daniel Nestor	(Switzerland) Martina Hingis (India) Mahesh Bhupathi	3–6, 3–6
Loss	2006	French Open	Clay	(Canada) Daniel Nestor	(Slovenia) Katarina Srebotnik (Serbia and Montenegro) Nenad Zimonjić	3–6, 4–6
Win	2007	Australian Open	Hard	(Canada) Daniel Nestor	(Belarus) Victoria Azarenka (Belarus) Max Mirnyi	6–4, 6–4

== WTA Tour finals ==
=== Singles: 8 (3 titles, 5 runner-ups) ===
Legend
Tier I (0/1)
Tier II (0/1)
Tier III (1/3)
Tier IV (1/0)
Tier V (1/0)

Result	W/L	Date	Tournament	Tier	Surface	Opponent	Score
Win	1–0	Oct 1993	Montpellier, France	Tier III	Carpet (i)	(Belgium) Dominique Monami	6–3, 6–4
Loss	1–1	Feb 1995	Oklahoma City, US	Tier III	Hard (i)	(Netherlands) Brenda Schultz-McCarthy	1–6, 2–6
Win	2–1	Jan 1997	Gold Coast, Australia	Tier III	Hard	(Japan) Ai Sugiyama	3–6, 7–6^{(9–7)}, 6–3
Loss	2–2	May 1999	Strasbourg, France	Tier III	Clay	(United States) Jennifer Capriati	1–6, 3–6
Loss	2–3	Oct 2000	Leipzig, Germany	Tier II	Carpet (i)	(Belgium) Kim Clijsters	6–7^{(6–8)}, 6–4, 4–6
Loss	2–4	Feb 2003	Doha, Qatar	Tier III	Hard	(Russia) Anastasia Myskina	3–6, 1–6
Loss	2–5	Aug 2004	Montreal, Canada	Tier I	Hard	(France) Amélie Mauresmo	1–6, 0–6
Win	3–5	Aug 2004	Forest Hills, US	Tier V	Hard	(Czech Republic) Iveta Benešová	6–2, 6–2

=== Doubles: 56 (27 titles, 29 runner-ups) ===
Legend
Grand Slam tournaments (0/4)
WTA Championships (0/2)
Tier I (4/4)
Tier II (10/16)
Tier III (7/1)
Tier IV & V (6/2)

Result	No.	Date	Tournament	Surface	Partner	Opponents	Score
Loss	1.	May 1997	Strasbourg	Clay	(Japan) Ai Sugiyama	(Czech Republic) Helena Suková (Belarus) Natasha Zvereva	1–6, 1–6
Win	1.	Jan 1998	Gold Coast	Hard	(Japan) Ai Sugiyama	(South Korea) Sung-Hee Park (Chinese Taipei) Wang Shi-ting	1–6, 6–3, 6–4
Loss	2.	Feb 1998	Hanover	Carpet (i)	(Netherlands) Caroline Vis	(United States) Lisa Raymond (Australia) Rennae Stubbs	1–6, 7–6^{(7–4)}, 3–6
Win	2.	Nov 1998	Luxembourg	Carpet (i)	(Japan) Ai Sugiyama	(Latvia) Larisa Neiland (Ukraine) Elena Tatarkova	6–7^{(3–7)}, 6–3, 2–0 ret.
Win	3.	Nov 1998	Leipzig	Carpet (i)	(Japan) Ai Sugiyama	(Netherlands) Manon Bollegraf (Romania) Irina Spîrlea	6–3, 6–7^{(2–7)}, 6–1
Win	4.	Nov 1998	Philadelphia	Carpet (i)	(Japan) Ai Sugiyama	(United States) Monica Seles (Belarus) Natasha Zvereva	7–5, 4–6, 6–2
Win	5.	Jan 1999	Sydney	Hard	(Japan) Ai Sugiyama	(United States) Mary Joe Fernández (Germany) Anke Huber	6–3, 2–6, 6–0
Loss	3.	Feb 1999	Paris	Carpet (i)	(Japan) Ai Sugiyama	(Romania) Irina Spîrlea (Netherlands) Caroline Vis	5–7, 6–3, 3–6
Win	6.	Apr 1999	Hilton Head	Clay	(Czech Republic) Jana Novotná	(Austria) Barbara Schett (Switzerland) Patty Schnyder	6–1, 6–4
Win	7.	May 1999	Strasbourg	Clay	(Japan) Ai Sugiyama	(France) Alexandra Fusai (France) Nathalie Tauziat	2–6, 7–6^{(8–6)}, 6–1
Loss	4.	Aug 1999	Stanford	Hard	(Russia) Anna Kournikova	(United States) Lindsay Davenport (United States) Corina Morariu	4–6, 4–6
Loss	5.	Aug 1999	New Haven	Hard	(Czech Republic) Jana Novotná	(United States) Lisa Raymond (Australia) Rennae Stubbs	6–7^{(1–7)}, 2–6
Loss	6.	Nov 1999	Leipzig	Carpet (i)	(Japan) Ai Sugiyama	(Latvia) Larisa Neiland (France) Mary Pierce	4–6, 3–6
Loss	7.	Sep 2000	US Open	Hard	(Zimbabwe) Cara Black	(Japan) Ai Sugiyama (France) Julie Halard-Decugis	0–6, 6–1, 1–6
Win	8.	Jan 2001	Hobart	Hard	(Zimbabwe) Cara Black	(Romania) Ruxandra Dragomir (Spain) Virginia Ruano Pascual	6–4, 6–1
Win	9.	May 2001	Hamburg	Clay	(Zimbabwe) Cara Black	(Czech Republic) Květa Peschke (Germany) Barbara Rittner	6–2, 4–6, 6–2
Loss	8.	May 2001	Berlin	Clay	(Zimbabwe) Cara Black	(Belgium) Els Callens (United States) Meghann Shaughnessy	4–6, 3–6
Win	10.	May 2001	Rome	Clay	(Zimbabwe) Cara Black	(Argentina) Paola Suárez (Argentina) Patricia Tarabini	6–1, 6–1
Win	11.	Jun 2001	Birmingham	Grass	(Zimbabwe) Cara Black	(United States) Kimberly Po (France) Nathalie Tauziat	6–1, 6–1
Loss	9.	Jun 2001	Eastbourne	Grass	(Zimbabwe) Cara Black	(United States) Lisa Raymond (Australia) Rennae Stubbs	2–6, 2–6
Win	12.	Jul 2001	San Diego	Hard	(Zimbabwe) Cara Black	(Switzerland) Martina Hingis (Russia) Anna Kournikova	6–4, 1–6, 6–4
Win	13.	Aug 2001	New Haven	Hard	(Zimbabwe) Cara Black	(Federal Republic of Yugoslavia) Jelena Dokić (Russia) Nadia Petrova	6–0, 3–6, 6–2
Win	14.	Sep 2001	Leipzig	Carpet (i)	(France) Nathalie Tauziat	(Czech Republic) Květa Peschke (Germany) Barbara Rittner	6–4, 6–2
Loss	10.	Nov 2001	Munich	Carpet (i)	(Zimbabwe) Cara Black	(United States) Lisa Raymond (Australia) Rennae Stubbs	5–7, 6–3, 3–6
Loss	11.	Mar 2002	Scottsdale	Hard	(Zimbabwe) Cara Black	(United States) Lisa Raymond (Australia) Rennae Stubbs	3–6, 7–5, 6–7^{(4–7)}
Win	15.	Apr 2002	Sarasota	Clay	(Federal Republic of Yugoslavia) Jelena Dokić	(Belgium) Els Callens (Spain) Conchita Martínez	6–7^{(5–7)}, 6–3, 6–3
Loss	12.	Jun 2002	Eastbourne	Grass	(Zimbabwe) Cara Black	(United States) Lisa Raymond (Australia) Rennae Stubbs	7–6^{(7–5)}, 6–7^{(6–8)}, 2–6
Loss	13.	Nov 2002	Los Angeles	Hard (i)	(Zimbabwe) Cara Black	(Russia) Elena Dementieva (Slovakia) Janette Husárová	6–4, 4–6, 3–6
Loss	14.	Jan 2003	Auckland	Hard	(Zimbabwe) Cara Black	(United States) Abigail Spears (United States) Teryn Ashley	2–6, 6–2, 0–6
Win	16.	Jan 2003	Hobart	Hard	(Zimbabwe) Cara Black	(Austria) Barbara Schett (Austria) Patricia Wartusch	7–5, 7–6^{(7–1)}
Win	17.	Feb 2003	Hyderabad	Hard	(Uzbekistan) Iroda Tulyaganova	(Russia) Evgenia Kulikovskaya (Belarus) Tatiana Poutchek	6–4, 6–4
Loss	15.	Feb 2003	Dubai	Hard	(Zimbabwe) Cara Black	(Russia) Svetlana Kuznetsova (United States) Martina Navratilova	3–6, 6–7^{(7–9)}
Loss	16.	Sep 2003	Leipzig	Carpet (i)	(Russia) Nadia Petrova	(United States) Martina Navratilova (Russia) Svetlana Kuznetsova	6–3, 1–6, 3–6
Win	18.	Jan 2004	Gold Coast	Hard	(Russia) Svetlana Kuznetsova	(South Africa) Liezel Huber (Bulgaria) Magdalena Maleeva	6–3, 6–4
Loss	17.	Feb 2004	Australian Open	Hard	(Russia) Svetlana Kuznetsova	(Spain) Virginia Ruano Pascual (Argentina) Paola Suárez	4–6, 3–6
Loss	18.	Feb 2004	Tokyo	Carpet (i)	(Bulgaria) Magdalena Maleeva	(Zimbabwe) Cara Black (Australia) Rennae Stubbs	0–6, 1–6
Loss	19.	Feb 2004	Dubai	Hard	(Russia) Svetlana Kuznetsova	(Slovakia) Janette Husárová (Spain) Conchita Martínez	0–6, 6–1, 3–6
Win	19.	Mar 2004	Doha	Hard	(Russia) Svetlana Kuznetsova	(Slovakia) Janette Husárová (Spain) Conchita Martínez	7–6^{(7–4)}, 6–2
Loss	20.	Mar 2004	Indian Wells	Hard	(Russia) Svetlana Kuznetsova	(Spain) Virginia Ruano Pascual (Argentina) Paola Suárez	1–6, 2–6
Loss	21.	Apr 2004	Miami	Hard	(Russia) Svetlana Kuznetsova	(Russia) Nadia Petrova (United States) Meghann Shaughnessy	2–6, 3–6
Loss	22.	Jun 2004	French Open	Clay	(Russia) Svetlana Kuznetsova	(Spain) Virginia Ruano Pascual (Argentina) Paola Suárez	0–6, 3–6
Loss	23.	Jun 2004	Eastbourne	Grass	(Russia) Svetlana Kuznetsova	(Australia) Alicia Molik (Spain) Magüi Serna	4–6, 4–6
Loss	24.	Sep 2004	US Open	Hard	(Russia) Svetlana Kuznetsova	(Spain) Virginia Ruano Pascual (Argentina) Paola Suárez	4–6, 5–7
Win	20.	Oct 2004	Linz	Hard (i)	(Slovakia) Janette Husárová	(France) Nathalie Dechy (Switzerland) Patty Schnyder	6–2, 7–5
Win	21.	Jan 2005	Gold Coast	Hard	(Bulgaria) Magdalena Maleeva	(Italy) Maria Elena Camerin (Italy) Silvia Farina Elia	6–3, 5–7, 6–1
Win	22.	Feb 2005	Tokyo	Carpet (i)	(Slovakia) Janette Husárová	(United States) Lindsay Davenport (United States) Corina Morariu	6–4, 6–3
Win	23.	May 2005	Berlin	Clay	(Russia) Vera Zvonareva	(Zimbabwe) Cara Black (South Africa) Liezel Huber	4–6, 6–4, 6–3
Loss	25.	Jun 2005	Eastbourne	Grass	(Russia) Vera Zvonareva	(United States) Lisa Raymond (Australia) Rennae Stubbs	3–6, 5–7
Loss	26.	Jul 2005	Stanford	Hard	(Russia) Vera Zvonareva	(Zimbabwe) Cara Black (Australia) Rennae Stubbs	3–6, 5–7
Win	24.	Sep 2005	Kolkata	Hard (i)	(Russia) Anastasia Myskina	(United States) Neha Uberoi (India) Shikha Uberoi	6–1, 6–0
Win	25.	Jan 2006	Auckland	Hard	(Russia) Vera Zvonareva	(France) Émilie Loit (Czech Republic) Barbora Záhlavová-Strýcová	6–3, 6–4
Win	26.	May 2006	Warsaw	Clay	(Russia) Anastasia Myskina	(Spain) Anabel Medina Garrigues (Slovenia) Katarina Srebotnik	6–3, 6–4
Win	27.	Jan 2007	Hobart	Hard	(Russia) Elena Vesnina	(Spain) Anabel Medina Garrigues (Spain) Virginia Ruano Pascual	2–6, 6–1, 6–2
Loss	27.	Feb 2007	Antwerp	Carpet (i)	(Russia) Elena Vesnina	(Zimbabwe) Cara Black (United States) Liezel Huber	5–7, 6–4, 1–6
Loss	28.	Apr 2007	Warsaw	Clay	(Russia) Elena Vesnina	(Russia) Vera Dushevina (Ukraine) Tatiana Perebiynis	5–7, 6–3, [2–10]
Loss	29.	Sep 2007	Portorož	Hard	(Slovenia) Andreja Klepač	(Czech Republic) Lucie Hradecká (Czech Republic) Renata Voráčová	7–5, 4–6, [7–10]

== ITF Circuit finals ==
$100,000 tournaments
$75,000 tournaments
$50,000 tournaments
$25,000 tournaments
$10,000 tournaments

=== Singles: 4 (2–2) ===
Result	No.	Date	Tournament	Surface	Opponent	Score
Win	1.	24 February 1992	Vilamoura, Portugal	Hard	(Bulgaria) Svetlana Krivencheva	4–6, 6–2, 7–6^{(2)}
Loss	1.	16 August 1992	Rebecq, Belgium	Clay	(Israel) Nelly Barkan	3–6, 0–6
Loss	2.	13 September 1992	Varna, Bulgaria	Clay	(Netherlands) Linda Niemantsverdriet	2–6, 3–6
Win	2.	31 January 1993	Båstad, Sweden	Hard (i)	(Italy) Maria Francesca Bentivoglio	6–2, 6–1

=== Doubles: 9 (6–3) ===
Result	No.	Date	Tournament	Surface	Partner	Opponents	Score
Win	1.	19 January 1992	Bamberg, Germany	Carpet (i)	(Netherlands) Dorien Wamelink	(Ukraine) Olga Lugina (Czech Republic) Markéta Štusková	4–6, 6–1, 6–2
Win	2.	17 February 1992	Algarve, Portugal	Hard	(Bulgaria) Svetlana Krivencheva	(Bulgaria) Angelina Petrova (Croatia) Petra Rihtarić	6–4, 6–4
Win	3.	24 February 1992	Vilamoura, Portugal	Hard	(Bulgaria) Svetlana Krivencheva	(Portugal) Tânia Couto (Portugal) Sofia Prazeres	6–3, 6–2
Win	4.	10 August 1992	Rebecq, Belgium	Clay	(Bulgaria) Svetlana Krivencheva	(Israel) Nelly Barkan (Russia) Maria Marfina	7–5, 6–2
Win	5.	17 August 1992	Koksijde, Belgium	Clay	(Russia) Maria Marfina	(Poland) Agata Werblińska (Bulgaria) Svetlana Krivencheva	6–3, 6–3
Loss	1.	31 August 1992	Burgas, Bulgaria	Clay	(Bulgaria) Svetlana Krivencheva	(Bulgaria) Galia Angelova (Bulgaria) Tzvetelina Nikolova	6–3, 4–6, 3–6
Loss	2.	19 October 1992	Moscow, Russia	Hard (i)	(Russia) Julia Lutrova	(Russia) Natalia Egorova (Russia) Svetlana Parkhomenko	4–6, 6–4, 4–6
Win	6.	15 November 1992	Manchester, United Kingdom	Carpet (i)	(Russia) Elena Makarova	(Bulgaria) Elena Pampoulova (Switzerland) Natalie Tschan	6–3, 6–4
Loss	3.	28 March 1993	Brest, France	Hard (i)	(Russia) Elena Makarova	(Netherlands) Kristie Boogert (Netherlands) Linda Niemantsverdriet	6–4, 5–7, 5–7

== Head-to-head record ==
- Steffi Graf 0–3
- Dominique Monami 5–5
- Kim Clijsters 1–3
- Justine Henin 0–3
- Serena Williams 1–4
- Lindsay Davenport 0–10
- Martina Hingis 0–8
- Venus Williams 0–9
- Arantxa Sánchez Vicario 4–5
- Nadia Petrova 3–4
- Dinara Safina 1–1
- Maria Sharapova 1–3

Sporting positions
Preceded by (Spain) Pilar Pérez	Orange Bowl Girls' Singles Champion; Category: 18 and under 1991	Succeeded by (Slovenia) Barbara Mulej
