= 2000 US Open (tennis) =

- Date: August 28 – September 10
- Edition: 120th
- Category: Grand Slam (ITF)
- Surface: Hardcourt
- Location: New York City, U.S.

Champions

Men's singles
- (Russia) Marat Safin

Women's singles
- (United States) Venus Williams

Men's doubles
- (Australia) Lleyton Hewitt / (Belarus) Max Mirnyi

Women's doubles
- (France) Julie Halard-Decugis / (Japan) Ai Sugiyama

Mixed doubles
- (Spain) Arantxa Sánchez Vicario / (United States) Jared Palmer

Boys' singles
- (United States) Andy Roddick

Girls' singles
- (Argentina) María Emilia Salerni

Boys' doubles
- (United Kingdom) Lee Childs / (United Kingdom) James Nelson

Girls' doubles
- (Argentina) Gisela Dulko / (Argentina) María Emilia Salerni
← 1999 ·	US Open	· 2001 →

The 2000 US Open was held between August 28 – September 10, 2000. It was the final Grand Slam event of 2000.

Both Andre Agassi and Serena Williams were unsuccessful in their title defences; Agassi being upset in the second round by Arnaud Clément and Williams losing in the quarter-finals to Lindsay Davenport. Marat Safin won his first US Open title and first of two Grand Slams, defeating Pete Sampras in the final, and Venus Williams defeated Davenport to win the women's title.

== Seniors ==
=== Men's singles ===
(Russia) Marat Safin defeated (United States) Pete Sampras, 6–4, 6–3, 6–3

• It was Safin's 1st career Grand Slam singles title and his 1st and only title at the US Open. It was Safin's 4th title of the year, and his 5th overall.

=== Women's singles ===
(United States) Venus Williams defeated (United States) Lindsay Davenport, 6–4, 7–5

• It was Williams' 2nd career Grand Slam singles title and her 1st title at the US Open. It was Williams' 5th title of the year, and her 14th overall.

=== Men's doubles ===
(Australia) Lleyton Hewitt / (Belarus) Max Mirnyi defeated (South Africa) Ellis Ferreira / (United States) Rick Leach, 6–4, 5–7, 7–6

• It was Hewitt's 1st and only career Grand Slam doubles title.
• It was Mirnyi's 1st career Grand Slam doubles title.

=== Women's doubles ===
(France) Julie Halard-Decugis / (Japan) Ai Sugiyama defeated (Zimbabwe) Cara Black / (Russia) Elena Likhovtseva, 6–0, 1–6, 6–1

• It was Halard-Decugis' 1st and only career Grand Slam doubles title.
• It was Sugiyama's 1st career Grand Slam doubles title and her 1st and only title at the US Open.

=== Mixed doubles ===
(Spain) Arantxa Sánchez Vicario / (United States) Jared Palmer defeated (Russia) Anna Kournikova / (Belarus) Max Mirnyi, 6–4, 6–3

• It was Sánchez Vicario's 4th and last career Grand Slam mixed doubles title and her 1st and only title at the US Open.
• It was Palmer's 2nd and last career Grand Slam mixed doubles title and his 1st and only title at the US Open.

== Juniors ==
=== Boys' singles ===
(United States) Andy Roddick defeated (United States) Robby Ginepri, 6–1, 6–3

=== Girls' singles ===
(Argentina) María Emilia Salerni defeated (Ukraine) Tatiana Perebiynis, 6–3, 6–4

=== Boys' doubles ===
(United Kingdom) Lee Childs / (United Kingdom) James Nelson defeated (United States) Tres Davis / (United States) Robby Ginepri, 6–2, 6–4

=== Girls' doubles ===
(Argentina) Gisela Dulko / (Argentina) María Emilia Salerni defeated (Hungary) Anikó Kapros / (Australia) Christina Wheeler, 3–6, 6–2, 6–2

== Prize money ==
Event		W	F	SF	QF	4R	3R	2R	1R
Singles	Men	$800,000	$425,000	$220,000	$110,000	$55,000	$35,000	$20,000	$10,000
Singles	Women	$800,000	$425,000	$220,000	$110,000	$55,000	$35,000	$20,000	$10,000

Total prize money for the event was $15,011,000.

Preceded by 2000 Wimbledon Championships	Grand Slam tournaments	Succeeded by 2001 Australian Open
