= 2000 US Open – Men's singles =

Men's singles
- 2000 US Open

Final
- Champion: (Russia) Marat Safin
- Runner-up: (United States) Pete Sampras
- Score: 6–4, 6–3, 6–3

Details
- Draw: 128
- Seeds: 16

Events
Singles	men	women		boys	girls
Doubles	men	women	mixed	boys	girls
WC Singles	men	women	quad
WC Doubles	men	women	quad
Legends	men	women	mixed
- US Open

Marat Safin defeated Pete Sampras in the final, 6–4, 6–3, 6–3 to win the men's singles tennis title at the 2000 US Open. Safin was the first male player born in the 1980s to win the major title, and it was also his first major title.

Andre Agassi was the defending champion, but lost in the second round to Arnaud Clément.

The tournament marked the first major main draw appearance of future world No. 1 and future champion Andy Roddick, and the first US Open main draw appearance of future world No. 1, five-time US Open champion, and 20-time major champion Roger Federer.

== Seeds ==
The seeded players are listed below. Marat Safin is the champion; others show the round in which they were eliminated.

1. (United States) Andre Agassi (second round)
2. (Brazil) Gustavo Kuerten (first round)
3. (Sweden) Magnus Norman (fourth round)
4. (United States) Pete Sampras (finalist)
5. (Russia) Yevgeny Kafelnikov (third round)
6. (Russia) Marat Safin (champion)
7. (Sweden) Thomas Enqvist (fourth round)
8. (Spain) Àlex Corretja (third round)
9. (Australia) Lleyton Hewitt (semifinalist)
10. (France) Cédric Pioline (third round)
11. (United Kingdom) Tim Henman (third round)
12. (Spain) Juan Carlos Ferrero (fourth round)
13. (Argentina) Franco Squillari (second round)
14. (Germany) Nicolas Kiefer (quarterfinalist)
15. (Australia) Mark Philippoussis (second round)
16. (Ecuador) Nicolás Lapentti (second round)

== Draw ==
Key

- Q = Qualifier
- WC = Wild card
- LL = Lucky loser
- Alt = Alternate
- ITF = ITF entry
- PR = Protected ranking
- SR = Special ranking
- SE = Special exempt
- JE = Junior exempt
- JR = Junior Accelerator Programme entrant
- CO = College Accelerator Programme entrant
- NG = Next Gen Accelerator Program entrant
- w/o = Walkover
- r = Retired
- d = Defaulted

=== Finals ===
Quarterfinals
(France) Arnaud Clément	2	4	3
9	(Australia) Lleyton Hewitt	6	6	6
4	(United States) Pete Sampras	4	7^{8}	6	6
(Netherlands) Richard Krajicek	6	6^{6}	4	2
6	(Russia) Marat Safin	7	4	7^{7}	6
14	(Germany) Nicolas Kiefer	5	6	6^{5}	3
(United States) Todd Martin	6	6	3	7
(Sweden) Thomas Johansson	4	4	6	5

Semifinals
9	(Australia) Lleyton Hewitt	6^{7}	4	6^{5}
4	(United States) Pete Sampras	7^{9}	6	7^{7}
6	(Russia) Marat Safin	6	7^{7}	7^{7}
(United States) Todd Martin	3	6^{4}	6^{1}

Final
4	(United States) Pete Sampras	4	3	3
6	(Russia) Marat Safin	6	6	6

=== Top half ===
==== Section 1 ====
First round
1	(United States) A Agassi	6	6	6
WC	(United States) A Kim	4	2	0
(Argentina) G Gaudio	3	4	2
(France) A Clément	6	6	6
(Germany) M Hantschk	3	0	6	7^{7}	4
(Morocco) H Arazi	6	6	4	6^{3}	6
(South Africa) W Ferreira	6	2	6	6
(Australia) A Ilie	3	6	4	1
Q	(France) C Kauffmann	4	4	6	3
(France) A Di Pasquale	6	6	4	6
WC	(United States) P King	3	4	3
(Romania) A Pavel	6	6	6
Q	(Zimbabwe) W Black	2	2	2
(France) J Golmard	6	6	6
WC	(United States) B Bryan	5	4	6^{4}
16	(Ecuador) N Lapentti	7	6	7^{7}

Second round
1	(United States) A Agassi	3	2	4
(France) A Clément	6	6	6
(Morocco) H Arazi	6	6	6^{5}	6
(South Africa) W Ferreira	3	3	7^{7}	3
(France) A Di Pasquale	7^{7}	1	3	4
(Romania) A Pavel	6^{5}	6	6	6
(France) J Golmard	7^{7}	6	2	4	7^{7}
16	(Ecuador) N Lapentti	6^{3}	0	6	6	6^{5}

Third round
(France) A Clément	4	6	6	4	0
(Morocco) H Arazi	6	2	2	6	1^{r}
(Romania) A Pavel	6	4
(France) J Golmard	2	1^{r}

Fourth round
(France) A Clément	3	6	6	7^{7}
(Romania) A Pavel	6	2	1	6^{5}

==== Section 2 ====
First round
9	(Australia) L Hewitt	2	7	6	6
(Sweden) A Vinciguerra	6	5	3	3
(France) S Huet	6^{3}	3	0
(France) J Boutter	7^{7}	6	6
(Czech Republic) J Novák	6	6	6
(Spain) A Martín	4	4	4
(Zimbabwe) B Black	7^{9}	6	7
WC	(United States) T Dent	6^{7}	3	5
(Chile) N Massú	3	5	6	6^{6}
(Chile) M Ríos	6	7	1	7^{8}
LL	(Germany) J Knippschild	6	6	6
Q	(United Kingdom) B Cowan	4	3	3
(United States) C Woodruff	6	6	6
LL	(Netherlands) J van Lottum	2	3	0
(Argentina) M Puerta	6	3	2	2
7	(Sweden) T Enqvist	3	6	6	6

Second round
9	(Australia) L Hewitt	7^{8}	6	6
(France) J Boutter	6^{6}	4	4
(Czech Republic) J Novák	2	6	7	7^{7}
(Zimbabwe) B Black	6	3	5	6^{4}
(Chile) M Ríos	4	6	6	7
LL	(Germany) J Knippschild	6	4	4	5
(United States) C Woodruff	3	2	2
7	(Sweden) T Enqvist	6	6	6

Third round
9	(Australia) L Hewitt	6	6	6
(Czech Republic) J Novák	3	3	3
(Chile) M Ríos	5	5	3
7	(Sweden) T Enqvist	7	7	6

Fourth round
9	(Australia) L Hewitt	6	6	6
7	(Sweden) T Enqvist	3	2	4

==== Section 3 ====
First round
4	(United States) P Sampras	7^{7}	7	6
(Czech Republic) M Damm	6^{3}	5	4
(Belgium) C Rochus	6	3	4	6^{4}
(United States) J Gimelstob	3	6	6	7^{7}
(Italy) D Sanguinetti	5	4	2
(Argentina) A Calleri	7	6	6
(Spain) D Sánchez	6^{4}	6^{3}	2
Q	(Czech Republic) P Kralert	7^{7}	7^{7}	6
Q	(United Kingdom) J Delgado	3	1	1
(Germany) T Haas	6	6	6
Q	(Canada) S Lareau	6^{4}	2	4
(Germany) R Schüttler	7^{7}	6	6
(United States) J Tarango	3	6	3	6^{6}
Q	(South Korea) H-T Lee	6	3	6	7^{8}
(Costa Rica) J A Marín	3	3	6^{5}
13	(Argentina) F Squillari	6	6	7^{7}

Second round
4	(United States) P Sampras	6	6	6
(United States) J Gimelstob	3	1	3
(Argentina) A Calleri	7	6	6
Q	(Czech Republic) P Kralert	5	4	3
(Germany) T Haas	6^{5}	2	4
(Germany) R Schüttler	7^{7}	6	6
Q	(South Korea) H-T Lee	7^{7}	7	6
13	(Argentina) F Squillari	6^{3}	5	2

Third round
4	(United States) P Sampras	7^{7}	7^{7}	6
(Argentina) A Calleri	6^{5}	6^{3}	3
(Germany) R Schüttler	2	6	4	4
Q	(South Korea) H-T Lee	6	3	6	6

Fourth round
4	(United States) P Sampras	7^{7}	6	6
Q	(South Korea) H-T Lee	6^{4}	2	4

==== Section 4 ====
First round
11	(United Kingdom) T Henman	6	6	6
(Spain) F Vicente	3	3	4
Q	(Chile) F González	6	6	6
WC	(Philippines) C Mamiit	3	4	1
(Netherlands) R Krajicek	6^{1}	6	6	6
LL	(Belgium) O Rochus	7^{7}	1	1	4
(Switzerland) M Kratochvil	6	4	1	6^{4}
(Brazil) A Sá	3	6	6	7^{7}
(Slovakia) D Hrbatý	3	6	6	6
(Croatia) G Ivanišević	6	0	1	0
(Morocco) Y El Aynaoui	3	4	6	6	3
(Morocco) K Alami	6	6	3	2	6
(Czech Republic) J Vaněk	3	4	6^{2}
(Germany) A Popp	6	6	7^{7}
(Bulgaria) O Stanoytchev	7^{7}	6	3	2	3
5	(Russia) Y Kafelnikov	6^{5}	1	6	6	6

Second round
11	(United Kingdom) T Henman	6	6	6
(Chile) F González	3	4	2
(Netherlands) R Krajicek	6	6	6
(Brazil) A Sá	4	4	1
(Slovakia) D Hrbatý	6	6	6
(Morocco) K Alami	3	4	3
(Germany) A Popp	7^{7}	4	4	4
5	(Russia) Y Kafelnikov	6^{3}	6	6	6

Third round
11	(United Kingdom) T Henman	4	6	6	5	5
(Netherlands) R Krajicek	6	3	4	7	7
(Slovakia) D Hrbatý	6	7^{7}	6
5	(Russia) Y Kafelnikov	4	6^{5}	1

Fourth round
(Netherlands) R Krajicek	7^{13}	6	6
(Slovakia) D Hrbatý	6^{11}	4	1

=== Bottom half ===
==== Section 5 ====
First round
6	(Russia) M Safin	7	6^{5}	6	6
(France) T Guardiola	5	7^{7}	4	4
(Norway) C Ruud	2	3	2
(Italy) G Pozzi	6	6	6
(Argentina) J I Chela	6	3	6^{4}	6^{5}
(Austria) S Koubek	4	6	7^{7}	7^{7}
WC	(United States) K Kim	3	2	4
(France) S Grosjean	6	6	6
(France) F Santoro	6^{4}	4	4
PR	(Canada) D Nestor	7^{7}	6	6
(Switzerland) R Federer	4	4	6	7	3
(Netherlands) P Wessels	6	6	3	5	4^{r}
(Argentina) H Gumy	4	7^{8}	7^{7}	6
Q	(United States) M Russell	6	6^{6}	6^{1}	4
(Brazil) F Meligeni	3	4	6	5
12	(Spain) JC Ferrero	6	6	3	7

Second round
6	(Russia) M Safin	6	3	6	3	6
(Italy) G Pozzi	3	6	3	6	4
(Austria) S Koubek	2	2	6	2
(France) S Grosjean	6	6	4	6
PR	(Canada) D Nestor	1	6^{5}	1
(Switzerland) R Federer	6	7^{7}	6
(Argentina) H Gumy	6	3	7^{7}	2	3
12	(Spain) JC Ferrero	1	6	6^{4}	6	6

Third round
6	(Russia) M Safin	6	7^{7}	1	3	7^{7}
(France) S Grosjean	4	6^{3}	6	6	6^{5}
(Switzerland) R Federer	5	6^{6}	6	6^{6}
12	(Spain) JC Ferrero	7	7^{8}	1	7^{8}

Fourth round
6	(Russia) M Safin	6	6	6
12	(Spain) JC Ferrero	1	2	2

==== Section 6 ====
First round
14	(Germany) N Kiefer	7	6	0	6
(Italy) A Gaudenzi	5	4	6	4
(Sweden) J Björkman	2	7^{7}	7^{7}	6
(Czech Republic) B Ulihrach	6	6^{4}	6^{4}	1
(Netherlands) S Schalken	6	7^{7}	6
Q	(Germany) L Burgsmüller	1	6^{5}	2
(Austria) M Hipfl	5	5	1
(Romania) A Voinea	7	7	6
(Belarus) M Mirnyi	7^{7}	6	7^{7}
(Slovakia) K Kučera	6^{3}	3	6^{3}
WC	(United States) A Roddick	3	7^{7}	1	4
(Spain) A Costa	6	6^{5}	6	6
Q	(France) C Saulnier	6	7	6
(Hungary) A Sávolt	3	5	3
(United States) P Goldstein	5	4	4
3	(Sweden) M Norman	7	6	6

Second round
14	(Germany) N Kiefer	6	6	6
(Sweden) J Björkman	1	4	3
(Netherlands) S Schalken	6	6	6
(Romania) A Voinea	2	3	1
(Belarus) M Mirnyi	6	6	6
(Spain) A Costa	4	1	4
Q	(France) C Saulnier	3	4	3
3	(Sweden) M Norman	6	6	6

Third round
14	(Germany) N Kiefer	7	6	6
(Netherlands) S Schalken	5	3	4
(Belarus) M Mirnyi	6	6	6^{5}	4	6^{9}
3	(Sweden) M Norman	3	4	7^{7}	6	7^{11}

Fourth round
14	(Germany) N Kiefer	6	6^{3}	6	6
3	(Sweden) M Norman	2	7^{7}	1	3

==== Section 7 ====
First round
8	(Spain) A Corretja	7^{7}	6	6
(Thailand) P Srichaphan	6^{2}	0	0
(Switzerland) M Rosset	6	6	6
Q	(Germany) C Vinck	4	1	4
(Czech Republic) S Doseděl	7^{7}	6	6
(Spain) F Clavet	6^{3}	4	1
(Spain) C Moyá	6	6	7
(Sweden) M Tillström	4	2	5
(United States) T Martin	6	6	1	6
(United States) V Spadea	4	1	6	2
(United States) M Chang	6	3	6	6
Q	(Israel) H Levy	2	6	4	4
(United Kingdom) G Rusedski	6	6	6
(Sweden) M Gustafsson	1	2	4
(Armenia) S Sargsian	3	3	1
10	(France) C Pioline	6	6	6

Second round
8	(Spain) A Corretja	6	7^{7}	6
(Switzerland) M Rosset	3	6^{4}	3
(Czech Republic) S Doseděl	3	6	5	2
(Spain) C Moyá	6	4	7	6
(United States) T Martin	6	6	6
(United States) M Chang	4	2	4
(United Kingdom) G Rusedski	7^{7}	6	4	6^{6}	3
10	(France) C Pioline	6^{4}	3	6	7^{8}	6

Third round
8	(Spain) A Corretja	6^{4}	3	6	4
(Spain) C Moyá	7^{7}	6	4	6
(United States) T Martin	7^{7}	6	6
10	(France) C Pioline	6^{5}	3	2

Fourth round
(Spain) C Moyá	7^{7}	7^{9}	1	6^{6}	2
(United States) T Martin	6^{3}	6^{7}	6	7^{8}	6

==== Section 8 ====
First round
15	(Australia) M Philippoussis	6	6	6
(Spain) A Portas	3	2	3
(United States) J-M Gambill	5	5	6	6	6
WC	(United States) M Fish	7	7	4	3	2
(Sweden) T Johansson	7^{7}	7^{7}	6
(Croatia) I Ljubičić	6^{1}	6^{5}	3
(Spain) G Blanco	7^{7}	2	6	1	7^{7}
(Australia) P Rafter	6^{3}	6	3	6	6^{5}
(Germany) D Prinosil	5	4	4
Q	(Belgium) X Malisse	7	6	6
(Switzerland) G Bastl	6	4	3	2
(Australia) R Fromberg	4	6	6	6
(Australia) J Stoltenberg	6	6	6
Q	(Netherlands) J Siemerink	0	4	1
Q	(Australia) W Arthurs	4	6	7^{7}	7^{7}
2	(Brazil) G Kuerten	6	3	6^{4}	6^{1}

Second round
15	(Australia) M Philippoussis	4	4	4
(United States) J-M Gambill	6	6	6
(Sweden) T Johansson	6	7^{7}	6
(Spain) G Blanco	4	6^{4}	2
Q	(Belgium) X Malisse	6^{4}	6	3	6^{2}
(Australia) R Fromberg	7^{7}	4	6	7^{7}
(Australia) J Stoltenberg	6	6^{2}	4	4
Q	(Australia) W Arthurs	2	7^{7}	6	6

Third round
(United States) J-M Gambill	6	3	6^{5}	6^{1}
(Sweden) T Johansson	3	6	7^{7}	7^{7}
(Australia) R Fromberg	6^{3}	6	3	6	3
Q	(Australia) W Arthurs	7^{7}	1	6	3	6

Fourth round
(Sweden) T Johansson	6	6^{7}	6	6
Q	(Australia) W Arthurs	4	7^{9}	3	4

Preceded by 2000 Wimbledon Championships – Men's singles	Grand Slam men's singles	Succeeded by 2001 Australian Open – Men's singles
