= 2000 US Open – Women's doubles =

Women's doubles
- 2000 US Open

Final
- Champions: (France) Julie Halard-Decugis (Japan) Ai Sugiyama
- Runners-up: (Zimbabwe) Cara Black (Russia) Elena Likhovtseva
- Score: 6–0, 1–6, 6–1

Details
- Draw: 64 (4 Q / 5 WC )
- Seeds: 16

Events
Singles	men	women		boys	girls
Doubles	men	women	mixed	boys	girls
WC Singles	men	women	quad
WC Doubles	men	women	quad
Legends	men	women	mixed
- US Open

The 2000 US Open was a tennis tournament played on outdoor hard courts at the USTA National Tennis Center in New York City in New York in the United States of America. It was the 120th edition of the US Open and was held from 28 August through 10 September 2000.

Serena Williams and Venus Williams were the defending champions, but withdrew from their semifinal match against Cara Black and Elena Likhovtseva.

Julie Halard-Decugis and Ai Sugiyama won the title, defeating Cara Black and Elena Likhovtseva 6–0, 1–6, 6–1 in the final. It was the first and only Grand Slam doubles title for Halard-Decugis, and the first Grand Slam doubles title for Sugiyama, in their respective careers.

== Seeds ==
1. (United States) Lisa Raymond / (Australia) Rennae Stubbs (quarterfinals)
2. (France) Julie Halard-Decugis / (Japan) Ai Sugiyama (champions)
3. (Switzerland) Martina Hingis / (France) Mary Pierce (third round)
4. (United States) Chanda Rubin / (France) Sandrine Testud (quarterfinals)
5. (Spain) Virginia Ruano Pascual / (Argentina) Paola Suárez (first round)
6. (France) Alexandra Fusai / (France) Nathalie Tauziat (third round)
7. (Germany) Anke Huber / (Austria) Barbara Schett (quarterfinals)
8. (United States) Nicole Arendt / (Netherlands) Manon Bollegraf (first round)
9. (Spain) Conchita Martínez / (Argentina) Patricia Tarabini (quarterfinals)
10. (Zimbabwe) Cara Black / (Russia) Elena Likhovtseva (final)
11. (United States) Kimberly Po / (France) Anne-Gaëlle Sidot (third round)
12. (Belgium) Els Callens / (Belgium) Dominique van Roost (semifinals)
13. (South Africa) Amanda Coetzer / (United States) Lori McNeil (third round)
14. (United States) Jennifer Capriati / (Russia) Anna Kournikova (second round)
15. (Slovenia) Tina Križan / (Kazakhstan) Irina Selyutina (third round)
16. (South Africa) Liezel Horn / (Argentina) Laura Montalvo (second round)

== Draw ==
Key

- Q = Qualifier
- WC = Wild card
- LL = Lucky loser
- Alt = Alternate
- ITF = ITF entry
- PR = Protected ranking
- SR = Special ranking
- SE = Special exempt
- JE = Junior exempt
- JR = Junior Accelerator Programme entrant
- CO = College Accelerator Programme entrant
- NG = Next Gen Accelerator Program entrant
- w/o = Walkover
- r = Retired
- d = Defaulted

=== Finals ===
Quarterfinals
1	(United States) Lisa Raymond (Australia) Rennae Stubbs	3	4
10	(Zimbabwe) Cara Black (Russia) Elena Likhovtseva	6	6
4	(United States) Chanda Rubin (France) Sandrine Testud	6	1	3
WC	(United States) Serena Williams (United States) Venus Williams	1	6	6
12	(Belgium) Els Callens (Belgium) Dominique van Roost	6	7^{7}
9	(Spain) Conchita Martínez (Argentina) Patricia Tarabini	3	6^{2}
7	(Germany) Anke Huber (Austria) Barbara Schett	4^{r}
2	(France) Julie Halard-Decugis (Japan) Ai Sugiyama	3

Semifinals
10	(Zimbabwe) Cara Black (Russia) Elena Likhovtseva	w/o
WC	(United States) Serena Williams (United States) Venus Williams
12	(Belgium) Els Callens (Belgium) Dominique van Roost	5	1
2	(France) Julie Halard-Decugis (Japan) Ai Sugiyama	7	6

Final
10	(Zimbabwe) Cara Black (Russia) Elena Likhovtseva	0	6	1
2	(France) Julie Halard-Decugis (Japan) Ai Sugiyama	6	1	6

=== Top half ===
==== Section 1 ====
First round
1	(United States) L Raymond (Australia) R Stubbs	6	6
(Japan) R Hiraki (Netherlands) S Noorlander	1	2
WC	(United States) M Irvin (United States) M Tu	7^{7}	4	7
Q	(Germany) A Bachmann (Germany) A Glass	6^{1}	6	5
(China) N Li (China) T Li	6	5	7^{7}
Q	(Czech Republic) E Martincová (Czech Republic) M Paštiková	3	7	6^{0}
(United States) E deLone (Australia) N Pratt	2	6	3
11	(United States) K Po (France) A-G Sidot	6	3	6
10	(Zimbabwe) C Black (Russia) E Likhovtseva	6	6
(Belarus) T Poutchek (Ukraine) A Zaporozhanova	0	4
(South Africa) S De Beer (Japan) N Miyagi	6	2	6
(Austria) P Wartusch (Canada) V Webb	4	6	4
(United States) A Frazier (United States) K Schlukebir	6	6
LL	(Argentina) M Díaz Oliva (Spain) L Domínguez Lino	2	1
(Italy) T Garbin (Slovakia) J Husárová	6	7
8	(United States) N Arendt (Netherlands) M Bollegraf	4	5

Second round
1	(United States) L Raymond (Australia) R Stubbs	6	6
WC	(United States) M Irvin (United States) M Tu	2	1
(China) N Li (China) T Li	4	3
11	(United States) K Po (France) A-G Sidot	6	6
10	(Zimbabwe) C Black (Russia) E Likhovtseva	3	7	6
(South Africa) S De Beer (Japan) N Miyagi	6	5	4
(United States) A Frazier (United States) K Schlukebir	2	1
(Italy) T Garbin (Slovakia) J Husárová	6	6

Third round
1	(United States) L Raymond (Australia) R Stubbs	6	6
11	(United States) K Po (France) A-G Sidot	4	2
10	(Zimbabwe) C Black (Russia) E Likhovtseva	6	6
(Italy) T Garbin (Slovakia) J Husárová	4	2

Quarterfinals
1	(United States) L Raymond (Australia) R Stubbs	3	4
10	(Zimbabwe) C Black (Russia) E Likhovtseva	6	6

==== Section 2 ====
First round
4	(United States) C Rubin (France) S Testud	6	6
(Russia) A Jidkova (Spain) G León García	4	3
(Italy) S Farina Elia (Slovakia) K Habšudová	1	6	3
(Russia) N Petrova (Switzerland) P Schnyder	6	3	6
(Spain) M Serna (United States) M Shaughnessy	6	6
(Australia) R McQuillan (Australia) L McShea	0	2
Q	(Slovenia) M Matevžič (Germany) S Schmidle	4	5
13	(South Africa) A Coetzer (United States) L McNeil	6	7
16	(South Africa) L Horn (Argentina) L Montalvo	1	6	6
(Australia) C Barclay (South Africa) N de Villiers	6	1	4
(Belgium) K Clijsters (Belgium) L Courtois	2	6	6
(Australia) A Ellwood (Australia) A Molik	6	3	1
(Netherlands) K Boogert (Netherlands) M Oremans	1	1
WC	(United States) S Williams (United States) V Williams	6	6
WC	(United States) L Osterloh (United States) A Stevenson	2	7	6
5	(Spain) V Ruano Pascual (Argentina) P Suárez	6	5	3

Second round
4	(United States) C Rubin (France) S Testud	6	6
(Russia) N Petrova (Switzerland) P Schnyder	1	2
(Spain) M Serna (United States) M Shaughnessy	4	4
13	(South Africa) A Coetzer (United States) L McNeil	6	6
16	(South Africa) L Horn (Argentina) L Montalvo	6^{5}	7^{7}	4
(Belgium) K Clijsters (Belgium) L Courtois	7^{7}	6^{4}	6
WC	(United States) S Williams (United States) V Williams	6	6
WC	(United States) L Osterloh (United States) A Stevenson	2	1

Third round
4	(United States) C Rubin (France) S Testud	7	6
13	(South Africa) A Coetzer (United States) L McNeil	5	3
(Belgium) K Clijsters (Belgium) L Courtois	1	7	1
WC	(United States) S Williams (United States) V Williams	6	5	6

Quarterfinals
4	(United States) C Rubin (France) S Testud	6	1	3
WC	(United States) S Williams (United States) V Williams	1	6	6

=== Bottom half ===
==== Section 3 ====
First round
6	(France) A Fusai (France) N Tauziat	6	6
(Hungary) K Marosi-Aracama (United Kingdom) L Woodroffe	3	4
(United Kingdom) J Pullin (Japan) Y Yoshida	6	5	2
(Australia) J Dokic (Netherlands) A Hopmans	0	7	6
Q	(Bulgaria) M Maleeva (Slovakia) H Nagyová	5	2
(Sweden) Å Carlsson (Canada) S Jeyaseelan	7	6
(Bulgaria) S Krivencheva (Belarus) N Ostrovskaya	1	6^{1}
12	(Belgium) E Callens (Belgium) D van Roost	6	7^{7}
9	(Spain) C Martínez (Argentina) P Tarabini	6^{4}	6	6
(Italy) G Casoni (Uzbekistan) I Tulyaganova	7^{7}	4	2
(Italy) A Canepa (Denmark) E Dyrberg	7^{7}	7^{9}
(Spain) RM Andrés Rodríguez (Spain) C Martínez Granados	6^{2}	6^{7}
(Australia) T Musgrave (Australia) B Stewart	2	1
(Bulgaria) L Bacheva (Spain) C Torrens Valero	6	6
WC	(Republic of Ireland) C Curran (Australia) A Jensen	6	0	1
3	(Switzerland) M Hingis (France) M Pierce	4	6	6

Second round
6	(France) A Fusai (France) N Tauziat	6	6
(Australia) J Dokic (Netherlands) A Hopmans	1	2
(Sweden) Å Carlsson (Canada) S Jeyaseelan	4	6	2
12	(Belgium) E Callens (Belgium) D van Roost	6	3	6
9	(Spain) C Martínez (Argentina) P Tarabini	6	7^{7}
(Italy) A Canepa (Denmark) E Dyrberg	4	6^{5}
(Bulgaria) L Bacheva (Spain) C Torrens Valero	0	2
3	(Switzerland) M Hingis (France) M Pierce	6	6

Third round
6	(France) A Fusai (France) N Tauziat	6	2	5
12	(Belgium) E Callens (Belgium) D van Roost	4	6	7
9	(Spain) C Martínez (Argentina) P Tarabini	w/o
3	(Switzerland) M Hingis (France) M Pierce

Quarterfinals
12	(Belgium) E Callens (Belgium) D van Roost	6	7^{7}
9	(Spain) C Martínez (Argentina) P Tarabini	3	6^{2}

==== Section 4 ====
First round
7	(Germany) A Huber (Austria) B Schett	1	6	6
(Argentina) F Labat (Thailand) T Tanasugarn	6	2	2
WC	(United States) T Cochran (United States) K Schlukebir	3	2
(United States) D Graham (Slovenia) K Srebotnik	6	6
(Belgium) S Appelmans (United States) L Wild	7	2	6^{3}
(United States) M Navratilova (Spain) A Sánchez Vicario	5	6	7^{7}
(Italy) R Grande (France) É Loit	1	4
14	(United States) J Capriati (Russia) A Kournikova	6	6
15	(Slovenia) T Križan (Kazakhstan) I Selyutina	6	6
(South Africa) M de Swardt (Netherlands) C Vis	4	4
(Croatia) J Kostanić (United States) T Snyder	6	6
(Spain) E Bes (Spain) G Riera	1	1
(Czech Republic) K Hrdličková (Germany) B Rittner	6	6
(Romania) C Cristea (Romania) R Dragomir	4	0
(Federal Republic of Yugoslavia) S Načuk (Slovenia) T Pisnik	6^{1}	4
2	(France) J Halard-Decugis (Japan) A Sugiyama	7^{7}	6

Second round
7	(Germany) A Huber (Austria) B Schett	3	6	6
(United States) D Graham (Slovenia) K Srebotnik	6	4	3
(United States) M Navratilova (Spain) A Sánchez Vicario	7	6
14	(United States) J Capriati (Russia) A Kournikova	5	0
15	(Slovenia) T Križan (Kazakhstan) I Selyutina	7	6
(Croatia) J Kostanić (United States) T Snyder	5	4
(Czech Republic) K Hrdličková (Germany) B Rittner	2	2
2	(France) J Halard-Decugis (Japan) A Sugiyama	6	6

Third round
7	(Germany) A Huber (Austria) B Schett	6	6
(United States) M Navratilova (Spain) A Sánchez Vicario	3	2
15	(Slovenia) T Križan (Kazakhstan) I Selyutina	3	3
2	(France) J Halard-Decugis (Japan) A Sugiyama	6	6

Quarterfinals
7	(Germany) A Huber (Austria) B Schett	4^{r}
2	(France) J Halard-Decugis (Japan) A Sugiyama	3
