= 2000 US Open – Mixed doubles =

Mixed doubles
- 2000 US Open

Final
- Champions: (Spain) Arantxa Sánchez Vicario (United States) Jared Palmer
- Runners-up: (Russia) Anna Kournikova (Belarus) Max Mirnyi
- Score: 6–4, 6–3

Details
- Draw: 32
- Seeds: 8

Events
Singles	men	women		boys	girls
Doubles	men	women	mixed	boys	girls
WC Singles	men	women	quad
WC Doubles	men	women	quad
Legends	men	women	mixed
- US Open

The 2000 US Open was a tennis tournament played on outdoor hard courts at the USTA National Tennis Center in New York City in New York in the United States. It was the 120th edition of the US Open and was held from 28 August through 10 September 2000.

Ai Sugiyama and Mahesh Bhupathi were the defending champions, but lost in first round to Karina Habšudová and David Rikl.

Arantxa Sánchez Vicario and Jared Palmer won the title, defeating Anna Kournikova and Max Mirnyi in the final 6–4, 6–3.

== Seeds ==
1. (Australia) Rennae Stubbs / (Australia) Todd Woodbridge (semifinals)
2. (Spain) Arantxa Sánchez Vicario / (United States) Jared Palmer (champions)
3. (Russia) Elena Likhovtseva / (Netherlands) Paul Haarhuis (semifinals)
4. (Russia) Anna Kournikova / (Belarus) Max Mirnyi (final)
5. (Japan) Ai Sugiyama / (India) Mahesh Bhupathi (first round)
6. (Austria) Barbara Schett / (Australia) Joshua Eagle (quarterfinals)
7. (Switzerland) Martina Hingis / (United States) Jan-Michael Gambill (quarterfinals, withdrew)
8. (Argentina) Paola Suárez / (Brazil) Jaime Oncins (second round)

== Draw ==
Key

- Q = Qualifier
- WC = Wild card
- LL = Lucky loser
- Alt = Alternate
- ITF = ITF entry
- PR = Protected ranking
- SR = Special ranking
- SE = Special exempt
- JE = Junior exempt
- JR = Junior Accelerator Programme entrant
- CO = College Accelerator Programme entrant
- NG = Next Gen Accelerator Program entrant
- w/o = Walkover
- r = Retired
- d = Defaulted

=== Finals ===
Semifinals
1	(Australia) Rennae Stubbs (Australia) Todd Woodbridge	4	6	3
4	(Russia) Anna Kournikova (Belarus) Max Mirnyi	6	3	6
3	(Russia) Elena Likhovtseva (Netherlands) Paul Haarhuis	4	4
2	(Spain) Arantxa Sánchez Vicario (United States) Jared Palmer	6	6

Final
4	(Russia) Anna Kournikova (Belarus) Max Mirnyi	4	3
2	(Spain) Arantxa Sánchez Vicario (United States) Jared Palmer	6	6

=== Top half ===
First round
1	(Australia) R Stubbs (Australia) T Woodbridge	6	6
(Spain) V Ruano Pascual (Spain) T Carbonell	3	2
WC	(United States) L Osterloh (United States) J Stark	6	7
(Netherlands) C Vis (Australia) A Kratzmann	2	5
(Sweden) Å Carlsson (Sweden) N Kulti	6	6^{6}	6
(Argentina) P Tarabini (Argentina) L Arnold	1	7^{8}	3
(Romania) C Cristea (Czech Republic) M Damm	4	6	6^{2}
8	(Argentina) P Suárez (Brazil) J Oncins	6	3	7^{7}
4	(Russia) A Kournikova (Belarus) M Mirnyi	7^{8}	6
(Australia) A Molik (Australia) S Stolle	6^{6}	2
WC	(United States) A Stevenson (United States) B MacPhie	6	3	6^{2}
WC	(United States) M Navratilova (United States) R Leach	4	6	7^{7}
Alt	(Slovakia) J Husárová (Czech Republic) J Novák	6	4	7^{7}
WC	(United States) L McNeil (United States) J Blake	2	6	6^{3}
(United States) L Raymond (India) L Paes	6^{2}	4
6	(Austria) B Schett (Australia) J Eagle	7^{7}	6

Second round
1	(Australia) R Stubbs (Australia) T Woodbridge	7	6
WC	(United States) L Osterloh (United States) J Stark	5	4
(Sweden) Å Carlsson (Sweden) N Kulti	4	6	5
8	(Argentina) P Suárez (Brazil) J Oncins	6	4	0^{r}
4	(Russia) A Kournikova (Belarus) M Mirnyi	6	4	7
WC	(United States) M Navratilova (United States) R Leach	3	6	5
Alt	(Slovakia) J Husárová (Czech Republic) J Novák	2	4
6	(Austria) B Schett (Australia) J Eagle	6	6

Quarterfinals
1	(Australia) R Stubbs (Australia) T Woodbridge	6	6
(Sweden) Å Carlsson (Sweden) N Kulti	3	4
4	(Russia) A Kournikova (Belarus) M Mirnyi	7	6
6	(Austria) B Schett (Australia) J Eagle	5	3

Semifinals
1	(Australia) R Stubbs (Australia) T Woodbridge	4	6	3
4	(Russia) A Kournikova (Belarus) M Mirnyi	6	3	6

=== Bottom half ===
First round
7	(Switzerland) M Hingis (United States) J-M Gambill	6	6
(United States) K Po (United States) D Johnson	2	3
(Slovenia) T Križan (Australia) A Florent	1	4
Alt	(France) A-G Sidot (Russia) A Olhovskiy	6	6
(France) A Fusai (United States) P Galbraith	6	6
(Netherlands) K Boogert (Australia) M Woodforde	1	3
(United States) N Arendt (United States) S Humphries	3	4
3	(Russia) E Likhovtseva (Netherlands) P Haarhuis	6	6
5	(Japan) A Sugiyama (India) M Bhupathi	3	1
(Slovakia) K Habšudová (Czech Republic) D Rikl	6	6
(France) J Halard-Decugis (Czech Republic) C Suk	4	4
(France) S Testud (Italy) D Nargiso	6	6
(Zimbabwe) C Black (The Bahamas) M Knowles	5	7	6
(Argentina) L Montalvo (Argentina) M García	7	5	3
(Slovenia) K Srebotnik (South Africa) P Norval	4	4
2	(Spain) A Sánchez Vicario (United States) J Palmer	6	6

Second round
7	(Switzerland) M Hingis (United States) J-M Gambill	6	6
Alt	(France) A-G Sidot (Russia) A Olhovskiy	1	4
(France) A Fusai (United States) P Galbraith	4	7	3
3	(Russia) E Likhovtseva (Netherlands) P Haarhuis	6	5	6
(Slovakia) K Habšudová (Czech Republic) D Rikl	5	6	7
(France) S Testud (Italy) D Nargiso	7	4	5
(Zimbabwe) C Black (The Bahamas) M Knowles	2	6^{1}
2	(Spain) A Sánchez Vicario (United States) J Palmer	6	7^{7}

Quarterfinals
7	(Switzerland) M Hingis (United States) J-M Gambill
3	(Russia) E Likhovtseva (Netherlands) P Haarhuis	w/o
(Slovakia) K Habšudová (Czech Republic) D Rikl	1	6	2
2	(Spain) A Sánchez Vicario (United States) J Palmer	6	4	6

Semifinals
3	(Russia) E Likhovtseva (Netherlands) P Haarhuis	4	4
2	(Spain) A Sánchez Vicario (United States) J Palmer	6	6
