= 2000 US Open – Women's singles =

Women's singles
- 2000 US Open

Final
- Champion: (United States) Venus Williams
- Runner-up: (United States) Lindsay Davenport
- Score: 6–4, 7–5

Details
- Draw: 128
- Seeds: 16

Events
Singles	men	women		boys	girls
Doubles	men	women	mixed	boys	girls
WC Singles	men	women	quad
WC Doubles	men	women	quad
Legends	men	women	mixed
- US Open

Venus Williams defeated Lindsay Davenport in the final, 6–4, 7–5 to win the women's singles tennis title at the 2000 US Open. It was her first US Open singles title and second major singles title overall. Williams became the second woman to win Wimbledon, the Olympics, and the US Open in the same season (after Steffi Graf in 1988.) Serena Williams was the defending champion, but was defeated in the quarterfinals by Davenport in a rematch of the previous year's semifinal.

This was the first major appearance for future French Open champion Francesca Schiavone. She entered the main draw as a qualifier and lost to Jelena Dokić in the third round.

== Seeds ==
1. (Switzerland) Martina Hingis (semifinals)
2. (United States) Lindsay Davenport (final)
3. (United States) Venus Williams (champion)
4. (France) Mary Pierce (fourth round, retired because of a shoulder injury)
5. (United States) Serena Williams (quarterfinals)
6. (United States) Monica Seles (quarterfinals)
7. (Spain) Conchita Martínez (third round)
8. (France) Nathalie Tauziat (quarterfinals)
9. (Spain) Arantxa Sánchez Vicario (fourth round)
10. (Germany) Anke Huber (quarterfinals)
11. (France) Sandrine Testud (fourth round)
12. (Russia) Anna Kournikova (third round)
13. (South Africa) Amanda Coetzer (third round)
14. (Belgium) Dominique Van Roost (second round)
15. (United States) Jennifer Capriati (fourth round)
16. (France) Julie Halard-Decugis (first round)

== Draw ==
Key

- Q = Qualifier
- WC = Wild card
- LL = Lucky loser
- Alt = Alternate
- ITF = ITF entry
- PR = Protected ranking
- SR = Special ranking
- SE = Special exempt
- JE = Junior exempt
- JR = Junior Accelerator Programme entrant
- CO = College Accelerator Programme entrant
- NG = Next Gen Accelerator Program entrant
- w/o = Walkover
- r = Retired
- d = Defaulted

=== Finals ===
Quarterfinals
1	(Switzerland) Martina Hingis	6	7
6	(United States) Monica Seles	0	5
3	(United States) Venus Williams	6	1	6
8	(France) Nathalie Tauziat	4	6	1
(Russia) Elena Dementieva	6	3	6
10	(Germany) Anke Huber	1	6	3
5	(United States) Serena Williams	4	2
2	(United States) Lindsay Davenport	6	6

Semifinals
1	(Switzerland) Martina Hingis	6	3	5
3	(United States) Venus Williams	4	6	7
(Russia) Elena Dementieva	2	6^{5}
2	(United States) Lindsay Davenport	6	7

Final
3	(United States) Venus Williams	6	7
2	(United States) Lindsay Davenport	4	5

=== Top half ===
==== Section 1 ====
First round
1	(Switzerland) M Hingis	6	6
(Russia) A Jidkova	3	1
Q	(Czech Republic) A Vašková	2	3
(United States) K Brandi	6	6
(Croatia) J Kostanić	6	7
Q	(Germany) G Arn	4	6^{4}
(Hungary) K Marosi-Aracama	1	1
(Italy) T Garbin	6	6
LL	(Federal Republic of Yugoslavia) S Načuk	1	7	3
(Japan) A Sugiyama	6	6^{6}	6
Q	(Croatia) M Lučić	6	4	1
(Netherlands) K Boogert	4	6	6
Q	(Canada) V Webb	6	3	4
(Uzbekistan) I Tulyaganova	3	6	6
(Australia) N Pratt	3	1
11	(France) S Testud	6	6

Second round
1	(Switzerland) M Hingis	6	6
(United States) K Brandi	1	1
(Croatia) J Kostanić	1	3
(Italy) T Garbin	6	6
(Japan) A Sugiyama	3	4
(Netherlands) K Boogert	6	6
(Uzbekistan) I Tulyaganova	4	3
11	(France) S Testud	6	6

Third round
1	(Switzerland) M Hingis	6	6
(Italy) T Garbin	1	0
(Netherlands) K Boogert	0	1
11	(France) S Testud	6	6

Fourth round
1	(Switzerland) M Hingis	6	6
11	(France) S Testud	2	1

==== Section 2 ====
First round
15	(United States) J Capriati	6	6
(Switzerland) E Gagliardi	4	0
(Switzerland) M Vavrinec	4	2
(Slovakia) H Nagyová	6	6
(Czech Republic) A Gerši	6	6
(United States) J Hopkins	1	4
(Zimbabwe) C Black	3	2
(France) N Dechy	6	6
(United States) C Rubin	6	6
(Sweden) Å Carlsson	2	2
(Austria) B Schett	6	3	7
(Italy) S Farina Elia	4	6	6^{6}
(Belarus) O Barabanschikova	2	4
(Luxembourg) A Kremer	6	6
WC	(United States) T Almeda-Singian	0	2
6	(United States) M Seles	6	6

Second round
15	(United States) J Capriati	6	6
(Slovakia) H Nagyová	2	2
(Czech Republic) A Gerši	7
(France) N Dechy	6^{3}	r
(United States) C Rubin	2	6	6
(Austria) B Schett	6	1	1
(Luxembourg) A Kremer	3	4
6	(United States) M Seles	6	6

Third round
15	(United States) J Capriati	6	6
(Czech Republic) A Gerši	2	3
(United States) C Rubin	3	6	4
6	(United States) M Seles	6	4	6

Fourth round
15	(United States) J Capriati	3	4
6	(United States) M Seles	6	6

==== Section 3 ====
First round
3	(United States) V Williams	6	6
(France) A-G Sidot	3	4
(Russia) A Myskina	1	7	3
(Czech Republic) K Hrdličková	6	5	6
(United States) M Shaughnessy	6	6
(Slovakia) K Habšudová	4	4
(Bulgaria) P Nola	6	6
(Canada) J Nejedly	1	2
(Italy) R Grande	6	6
(Romania) C Cristea	2	2
(Spain) M Serna	7	7
(Austria) P Wartusch	6^{4}	5
WC	(United States) B Rippner	3	6	4
(Germany) J Kandarr	6	2	6
WC	(United States) S Cacic	2	2
13	(South Africa) A Coetzer	6	6

Second round
3	(United States) V Williams	6	6
(Czech Republic) K Hrdličková	1	1
(United States) M Shaughnessy	6	6
(Bulgaria) P Nola	3	2
(Italy) R Grande	6^{4}	3
(Spain) M Serna	7	6
(Germany) J Kandarr	6	4	2
13	(South Africa) A Coetzer	2	6	6

Third round
3	(United States) V Williams	7	6
(United States) M Shaughnessy	6^{3}	1
(Spain) M Serna	7	7
13	(South Africa) A Coetzer	5	6^{3}

Fourth round
3	(United States) V Williams	6	6
(Spain) M Serna	2	2

==== Section 4 ====
First round
9	(Spain) A Sánchez Vicario	5	6	7
(South Africa) J Kruger	7	4	6^{2}
(Canada) S Jeyaseelan	6	7
(France) A Cocheteux	2	5
(Hungary) R Kuti-Kis	4	7	5
(United States) M Irvin	6	6^{11}	7
(France) S Pitkowski	4	2
WC	(United States) A Bradshaw	6	6
WC	(United States) A Cargill	6^{5}	5
WC	(United States) D Buth	7	7
WC	(United States) M Washington	4	4
Q	(Chinese Taipei) J Lee	6	6
(Venezuela) M-A Vento	6	6
(Belgium) S Appelmans	4	2
Q	(Slovakia) L Cervanová	6	2	4
8	(France) N Tauziat	3	6	6

Second round
9	(Spain) A Sánchez Vicario	6	6
(Canada) S Jeyaseelan	4	1
(United States) M Irvin	3	1
WC	(United States) A Bradshaw	6	6
WC	(United States) D Buth	2	5
Q	(Chinese Taipei) J Lee	6	7
(Venezuela) M-A Vento	3	1
8	(France) N Tauziat	6	6

Third round
9	(Spain) A Sánchez Vicario	7	6
WC	(United States) A Bradshaw	6^{2}	0
Q	(Chinese Taipei) J Lee	3	2
8	(France) N Tauziat	6	6

Fourth round
9	(Spain) A Sánchez Vicario	3	2
8	(France) N Tauziat	6	6

=== Bottom half ===
==== Section 5 ====
First round
7	(Spain) C Martínez	3	6	6
(United States) A Frazier	6	2	4
Q	(Hungary) P Mandula	3	5
(Spain) M Sánchez Lorenzo	6	7
(United States) T Snyder	5	1
(Russia) E Dementieva	7	6
(Austria) S Plischke	6	6
(Argentina) P Suárez	3	3
(Japan) S Asagoe	6	3	6
Q	(Australia) R McQuillan	2	6	3
(Switzerland) P Schnyder	5	6	6
Q	(United States) J Craybas	7	1	3
(United States) L Osterloh	6	3	6
(Spain) C Torrens-Valero	0	6	3
Q	(Germany) A Bachmann	3	3
14	(Belgium) D Van Roost	6	6

Second round
7	(Spain) C Martínez	6	6
(Spain) M Sánchez Lorenzo	3	2
(Russia) E Dementieva	6	7
(Austria) S Plischke	4	6^{6}
(Japan) S Asagoe	7	6
(Switzerland) P Schnyder	5	4
(United States) L Osterloh	7	4
14	(Belgium) D Van Roost	6^{7}	6	r

Third round
7	(Spain) C Martínez	4	1
(Russia) E Dementieva	6	6
(Japan) S Asagoe	5	0
(United States) L Osterloh	7	6

Fourth round
(Russia) E Dementieva	6	6^{4}	7
(United States) L Osterloh	3	7	6^{5}

==== Section 6 ====
First round
10	(Germany) A Huber	6	6
(United States) M Tu	2	3
(Russia) T Panova	6	6
Q	(Tunisia) S Sfar	3	1
(Russia) E Likhovtseva	7	6
Q	(Germany) M Schnitzer	6^{4}	4
(Belgium) E Callens	6	6
(United States) E deLone	1	1
(Romania) R Dragomir	6	6
WC	(United States) K Schlukebir	4	1
(United States) L Raymond	6	6
(Poland) M Grzybowska	1	0
(Bulgaria) M Maleeva	6	6
(China) J-Q Yi	3	3
(United States) A Stevenson	3	4
4	(France) M Pierce	6	6

Second round
10	(Germany) A Huber	6	6
(Russia) T Panova	2	3
(Russia) E Likhovtseva	7	4	6
(Belgium) E Callens	6^{2}	6	1
(Romania) R Dragomir	4	2
(United States) L Raymond	6	6
(Bulgaria) M Maleeva	5	6	1
4	(France) M Pierce	7	2	6

Third round
10	(Germany) A Huber	6	6
(Russia) E Likhovtseva	2	3
(United States) L Raymond	4	6^{6}
4	(France) M Pierce	6	7

Fourth round
10	(Germany) A Huber	6	0
4	(France) M Pierce	4	0^{r}

==== Section 7 ====
First round
5	(United States) S Williams	6	6
(Slovenia) T Pisnik	3	2
(Russia) N Petrova	6	6
Q	(Czech Republic) D Bedáňová	3	1
Q	(Hungary) K Nagy	6	6^{4}	3
(Italy) G Casoni	3	7	6
(Paraguay) R de los Ríos	2	4
(Bulgaria) L Bacheva	6	6
Q	(Italy) F Schiavone	6	6
(Croatia) S Talaja	3	3
Q	(Italy) G Pizzichini	7	6
(Netherlands) A Hopmans	6^{7}	0
(Israel) A Smashnova	1	0
(Australia) J Dokić	6	6
(Netherlands) M Oremans	6	6
16	(France) J Halard-Decugis	3	4

Second round
5	(United States) S Williams	6	6
(Russia) N Petrova	3	2
(Italy) G Casoni	6	6
(Bulgaria) L Bacheva	2	4
Q	(Italy) F Schiavone	6	6
Q	(Italy) G Pizzichini	4	4
(Australia) J Dokić	6	6
(Netherlands) M Oremans	1	4

Third round
5	(United States) S Williams	6	6
(Italy) G Casoni	4	2
Q	(Italy) F Schiavone	6^{4}	5
(Australia) J Dokić	7	7

Fourth round
5	(United States) S Williams	7	6
(Australia) J Dokić	6^{7}	0

==== Section 8 ====
First round
12	(Russia) A Kournikova	6	6
(United States) H Parkinson	2	3
(Czech Republic) S Kleinová	7	7
(Russia) L Krasnoroutskaya	5	6^{4}
(Czech Republic) D Chládková	1	2
LL	(Australia) A Molik	6	6
(Argentina) F Labat	2	4
(Belgium) J Henin	6	6
(Spain) V Ruano Pascual	4	6	6
(Slovenia) K Srebotnik	6	4	3
(Spain) Á Montolio	1	1
(Thailand) T Tanasugarn	6	6
(Belgium) K Clijsters	6	6
(Spain) M Marrero	0	0
(Spain) G León García	0	1
2	(United States) L Davenport	6	6

Second round
12	(Russia) A Kournikova	6	6
(Czech Republic) S Kleinová	4	1
LL	(Australia) A Molik	2	2
(Belgium) J Henin	6	6
(Spain) V Ruano Pascual	6	3	1
(Thailand) T Tanasugarn	3	6	6
(Belgium) K Clijsters	6	2	2
2	(United States) L Davenport	4	6	6

Third round
12	(Russia) A Kournikova	4	6^{5}
(Belgium) J Henin	6	7
(Thailand) T Tanasugarn	2	1
2	(United States) L Davenport	6	6

Fourth round
(Belgium) J Henin	0	4
2	(United States) L Davenport	6	6

Preceded by 2000 Wimbledon Championships – Women's singles	Grand Slam women's singles	Succeeded by 2001 Australian Open – Women's singles
