= 2000 US Open – Men's doubles =

Men's doubles
- 2000 US Open

Final
- Champions: (Australia) Lleyton Hewitt (Belarus) Max Mirnyi
- Runners-up: (South Africa) Ellis Ferreira (United States) Rick Leach
- Score: 6–4, 5–7, 7–6^{(7–5)}

Details
- Draw: 64
- Seeds: 16

Events
Singles	men	women		boys	girls
Doubles	men	women	mixed	boys	girls
WC Singles	men	women	quad
WC Doubles	men	women	quad
Legends	men	women	mixed
- US Open

Lleyton Hewitt and Max Mirnyi defeated Ellis Ferreira and Rick Leach in the final, 6–4, 5–7, 7–6^{(7–5)} to win the men's doubles tennis title at the 2000 US Open. It was their maiden major title.

Alex O'Brien and Sébastien Lareau were the defending champions but chose not to participate with each other. Sébastien partnered with Daniel Nestor, while Alex partnered with Jared Palmer. Both new pairings lost to Hewitt and Mirnyi, in the quarterfinals and semifinals, respectively.

This marked the last major appearance of former world No. 1 and 17-time major champion Mark Woodforde, and thus the last major appearance of the Woodies; they were defeated in the second round by Hewitt and Mirnyi.

== Seeds ==
Champion seeds are indicated in bold text while text in italics indicates the round in which those seeds were eliminated.

1. (Australia) Todd Woodbridge / (Australia) Mark Woodforde (second round)
2. (Netherlands) Paul Haarhuis / (Australia) Sandon Stolle (quarterfinals)
3. (United States) Alex O'Brien / (United States) Jared Palmer (semifinals)
4. (South Africa) Ellis Ferreira / (United States) Rick Leach (final)
5. (Czech Republic) Jiří Novák / (Czech Republic) David Rikl (first round)
6. (South Africa) David Adams / (South Africa) John-Laffnie de Jager (first round)
7. (Canada) Sébastien Lareau / (Canada) Daniel Nestor (quarterfinals)
8. (South Africa) Wayne Ferreira / (Russia) Yevgeny Kafelnikov (semifinals)
9. Unknown (withdrew)
10. (Australia) Joshua Eagle / (Australia) Andrew Florent (first round)
11. Unknown (withdrew)
12. (Sweden) Jonas Björkman / (Zimbabwe) Byron Black (first round)
13. (United States) Donald Johnson / (South Africa) Piet Norval (first round)
14. (Switzerland) Roger Federer / (Australia) Andrew Kratzmann (second round)
15. (Russia) Andrei Olhovskiy / (Germany) David Prinosil (first round)
16. (Spain) Tomás Carbonell / (Argentina) Martín García (first round)

== Draw ==
Key

- Q = Qualifier
- WC = Wild card
- LL = Lucky loser
- Alt = Alternate
- ITF = ITF entry
- PR = Protected ranking
- SR = Special ranking
- SE = Special exempt
- JE = Junior exempt
- JR = Junior Accelerator Programme entrant
- CO = College Accelerator Programme entrant
- NG = Next Gen Accelerator Program entrant
- w/o = Walkover
- r = Retired
- d = Defaulted

=== Finals ===
Quarterfinals
(Australia) **Lleyton Hewitt** **(Belarus) Max Mirnyi**	**7**	**6**
7	(Canada) Sébastien Lareau (Canada) Daniel Nestor	6^{5}	4
3	(United States) **Alex O'Brien** **(United States) Jared Palmer**	**6**	**6**
(Australia) David Macpherson (South Africa) Grant Stafford	0	4
(United States) Mike Bryan (United States) Bob Bryan	1	2
4	(South Africa) **Ellis Ferreira** **(United States) Rick Leach**	**6**	**6**
8	(South Africa) **Wayne Ferreira** **(Russia) Yevgeny Kafelnikov**	**6**	**7**
2	(Netherlands) Paul Haarhuis (Australia) Sandon Stolle	3	6^{5}

Semifinals
(Australia) **Lleyton Hewitt** **(Belarus) Max Mirnyi**	**6**	3	**7**
3	(United States) Alex O'Brien (United States) Jared Palmer	4	**6**	6^{8}
4	(South Africa) **Ellis Ferreira** **(United States) Rick Leach**	**6**	5	**6**
8	(South Africa) Wayne Ferreira (Russia) Yevgeny Kafelnikov	4	**7**	3

Final
(Australia) **Lleyton Hewitt** (Belarus) Max Mirnyi	**6**	5	**7**
4	(South Africa) Ellis Ferreira (United States) Rick Leach	4	**7**	6^{5}

=== Top half ===
==== Section 1 ====
First round
1	(Australia) **T Woodbridge** **(Australia) M Woodforde**	**6**	**6**
WC	(Philippines) C Mamiit (United States) J Thomas	4	1
(Australia) **L Hewitt** **(Belarus) M Mirnyi**	**6**	**6**
(United States) J Stark (Philippines) E Taino	3	4
(Brazil) **J Oncins** **(Argentina) D Orsanic**	4	**7**	**6**
(India) M Bhupathi (India) L Paes	**6**	6^{5}	2
(South Africa) **C Haggard** **(Belgium) T Vanhoudt**	**6**	5	**6**
16	(Spain) T Carbonell (Argentina) M García	4	**7**	4
(Sweden) **N Kulti** **(Sweden) M Tillström**	**6**	**6**
(Italy) M Bertolini (Italy) C Brandi	3	4
WC	(United States) **P Goldstein** **(United States) C Woodruff**	**6**	6^{4}	**7**
(Zimbabwe) W Black (Zimbabwe) K Ullyett	2	**7**	6^{8}
(Argentina) **P Albano** **(Argentina) L Arnold**	6^{8}	**6**	**6**
WC	(United States) T Davis (United States) R Ginepri	**7**	3	1
7	(Canada) **S Lareau** **(Canada) D Nestor**	**6**	**7**
(Germany) M-K Goellner (Germany) M Kohlmann	4	5

Second round
1	(Australia) T Woodbridge (Australia) M Woodforde	1	**6**	6^{4}
(Australia) **L Hewitt** **(Belarus) M Mirnyi**	**6**	4	**7**
(Brazil) **J Oncins** **(Argentina) D Orsanic**	**7**	**6**
(South Africa) C Haggard (Belgium) T Vanhoudt	6^{4}	3
(Sweden) **N Kulti** **(Sweden) M Tillström**	**7**	**7**
WC	(United States) P Goldstein (United States) C Woodruff	6^{5}	6^{3}
(Argentina) P Albano (Argentina) L Arnold	3	3
7	(Canada) **S Lareau** **(Canada) D Nestor**	**6**	**6**

Third round
(Australia) **L Hewitt** **(Belarus) M Mirnyi**	**6**	**6**
(Brazil) J Oncins (Argentina) D Orsanic	3	2
(Sweden) N Kulti (Sweden) M Tillström	6^{5}	3
7	(Canada) **S Lareau** **(Canada) D Nestor**	**7**	**6**

Quarterfinals
(Australia) **L Hewitt** **(Belarus) M Mirnyi**	**7**	**6**
7	(Canada) S Lareau (Canada) D Nestor	6^{5}	4

==== Section 2 ====
First round
3	(United States) **A O'Brien** **(United States) J Palmer**	**6**	**6**
(United States) J Gimelstob (The Bahamas) M Knowles	3	2
(Spain) **J Balcells** **(Spain) JI Carrasco**	**7**	**6**
(Spain) A Martín (Israel) E Ran	6^{5}	4
(United States) **J-M Gambill** **(United States) S Humphries**	**7**	**6**
(United States) D Bowen (Israel) J Erlich	6^{1}	3
PR	(Sweden) **F Bergh** **(Sweden) P Nyborg**	4	**6**	**7**
13	(United States) D Johnson (South Africa) P Norval	**6**	4	6^{5}
(Czech Republic) **M Damm** **(Slovakia) D Hrbatý**	**6**	**6**
WC	(United States) H Armando (United States) M Sprengelmeyer	4	2
Q	(Switzerland) **L Manta** **(Italy) L Tieleman**	**7**	**6**
(Australia) P Kilderry (Australia) P Tramacchi	6^{6}	2
WC	(United States) **J Blake** **(United States) K Kim**	**7**	**6**
(Czech Republic) P Pála (Czech Republic) P Vízner	6^{4}	1
(Australia) **D Macpherson** **(South Africa) G Stafford**	**6**	**6**
5	(Czech Republic) J Novák (Czech Republic) D Rikl	3	4

Second round
3	(United States) **A O'Brien** **(United States) J Palmer**	**7**	**7**
(Spain) J Balcells (Spain) JI Carrasco	6^{2}	6^{8}
(United States) J-M Gambill (United States) S Humphries	6^{4}	**7**	5
PR	(Sweden) **F Bergh** **(Sweden) P Nyborg**	**7**	**6**	**7**
(Czech Republic) **M Damm** **(Slovakia) D Hrbatý**	**6**	**6**
Q	(Switzerland) L Manta (Italy) L Tieleman	2	;4
WC	(United States) J Blake (United States) K Kim	4	6^{3}
(Australia) **D Macpherson** **(South Africa) G Stafford**	**6**	**7**

Third round
3	(United States) **A O'Brien** **(United States) J Palmer**	**6**	**7**
PR	(Sweden) F Bergh (Sweden) P Nyborg	4	5
(Czech Republic) M Damm (Slovakia) D Hrbatý	6^{4}	**7**	3
(Australia) **D Macpherson** **(South Africa) G Stafford**	**7**	6^{5}	**6**

Quarterfinals
3	(United States) **A O'Brien** **(United States) J Palmer**	**6**	**6**
(Australia) D Macpherson (South Africa) G Stafford	0	4

=== Bottom half ===
==== Section 3 ====
First round
(United States) **B Bryan** **(United States) M Bryan**	**6**	**7**
6	(South Africa) D Adams (South Africa) J-L de Jager	4	6^{6}
(Argentina) **G Etlis** **(Argentina) S Prieto**	**7**	**6**
Q	(Czech Republic) P Kovačka (Czech Republic) P Kudrnáč	6^{5}	4
Q	(Australia) **P Hanley** **(Australia) N Healey**	6^{4}	**6**	**7**
(Czech Republic) T Cibulec (Czech Republic) L Friedl	**7**	4	6^{3}
(South Africa) **J Coetzee** **(South Africa) B Haygarth**	**6**	**6**
12	(Sweden) J Björkman (Zimbabwe) B Black	2	2
14	(Switzerland) **R Federer** **(Australia) A Kratzmann**	**6**	**6**
(North Macedonia) A Kitinov (Netherlands) J Siemerink	4	4
(Australia) **W Arthurs** **(Socialist Federal Republic of Yugoslavia) N Zimonjić**	**6**	**6**
Q	(Germany) K Braasch (Germany) L Burgsmüller	1	4
(Argentina) **M Hood** **(United States) J Waite**	**6**	**7**
(Spain) Á López Morón (Spain) A Portas	3	6^{3}
4	(South Africa) **E Ferreira** **(United States) R Leach**	3	**6**	**6**
(France) M Llodra (Italy) D Nargiso	**6**	1	4

Second round
(United States) **B Bryan** **(United States) M Bryan**	**6**	**7**
(Argentina) G Etlis (Argentina) S Prieto	3	5
Q	(Australia) P Hanley (Australia) N Healey	4	3
(South Africa) **J Coetzee** **(South Africa) B Haygarth**	**6**	**6**
14	(Switzerland) R Federer (Australia) A Kratzmann	4	6^{6}
(Australia) **W Arthurs** **(Socialist Federal Republic of Yugoslavia) N Zimonjić**	**6**	**7**
(Argentina) M Hood (United States) J Waite	6^{8}	5
4	(South Africa) **E Ferreira** **(United States) R Leach**	**7**	**7**

Third round
(United States) **B Bryan** **(United States) M Bryan**	**6**	2	**6**
(South Africa) J Coetzee (South Africa) B Haygarth	3	**6**	4
(Australia) W Arthurs (Socialist Federal Republic of Yugoslavia) N Zimonjić	4	**6**	6^{5}
4	(South Africa) **E Ferreira** **(United States) R Leach**	**6**	3	**7**

Quarterfinals
(United States) B Bryan (United States) M Bryan	1	2
4	(South Africa) **E Ferreira** **(United States) R Leach**	**6**	**6**

==== Section 4 ====
First round
8	(South Africa) **W Ferreira** **(Russia) Y Kafelnikov**	3	**6**	**6**
(Czech Republic) C Suk (South Africa) J Weir-Smith	**6**	2	4
(Italy) **A Gaudenzi** **(Switzerland) M Rosset**	2	**6**	**7**
(South Africa) M Ondruska (Brazil) A Prieto	**6**	4	6^{5}
WC	(United States) **T Dent** **(United States) A Roddick**	**7**	5	**6**
(South Africa) N Godwin (Australia) M Hill	6^{9}	**7**	4
(Germany) **J Knippschild** **(United States) J Tarango**	**6**	**7**
10	(Australia) J Eagle (Australia) A Florent	3	6^{4}
(France) **J Boutter** **(France) F Santoro**	**6**	**6**
15	(Russia) A Olhovskiy (Germany) D Prinosil	2	2
(South Africa) **M Barnard** **(South Africa) R Koenig**	5	**7**	**6**
WC	(United States) C Franklin (United States) G Oliver	**7**	5	1
(United States) **P Galbraith** **(United States) B MacPhie**	**6**	**7**
(Japan) T Shimada (South Africa) M Wakefield	3	6^{5}
2	(Netherlands) **P Haarhuis** **(Australia) S Stolle**	4	**7**	**6**
(Sweden) S Aspelin (Sweden) J Landsberg	**6**	6^{6}	4

Second round
8	(South Africa) **W Ferreira** **(Russia) Y Kafelnikov**	**7**	**7**
(Italy) A Gaudenzi (Switzerland) M Rosset	5	5
WC	(United States) T Dent (United States) A Roddick	**6**	3	4
(Germany) **J Knippschild** **(United States) J Tarango**	3	**6**	**6**
(France) J Boutter (France) F Santoro	6^{5}	5
(South Africa) **M Barnard** **(South Africa) R Koenig**	**7**	**7**
(United States) P Galbraith (United States) B MacPhie	4	**7**	5
2	(Netherlands) **P Haarhuis** **(Australia) S Stolle**	**6**	6^{5}	**7**

Third round
8	(South Africa) **W Ferreira** **(Russia) Y Kafelnikov**	**6**	**6**
(Germany) J Knippschild (United States) J Tarango	3	0
(South Africa) M Barnard (South Africa) R Koenig	**7**	6^{1}	5
2	(Netherlands) **P Haarhuis** **(Australia) S Stolle**	6^{2}	**7**	**7**

Quarterfinals
8	(South Africa) **W Ferreira** **(Russia) Y Kafelnikov**	**6**	**7**
2	(Netherlands) P Haarhuis (Australia) S Stolle	3	6^{5}
