= 2000 Dutch Open – Doubles =

Doubles
- 2000 Dutch Open

Final
- Champions: (Argentina) Sergio Roitman (Argentina) Andrés Schneiter
- Runners-up: (Netherlands) Edwin Kempes (Netherlands) Dennis van Scheppingen
- Score: 4–6, 6–4, 6–1

Events
Singles	Doubles
← 1999 ·	Dutch Open	· 2001 →

Paul Haarhuis and Sjeng Schalken were the defending champions, but did not participate this year.

Sergio Roitman and Andrés Schneiter won in the final 4–6, 6–4, 6–1, against Edwin Kempes and Dennis van Scheppingen.

== Seeds ==
1. (Japan) Thomas Shimada / (South Africa) Myles Wakefield (quarterfinals)
2. (Australia) Wayne Arthurs / (Ecuador) Nicolás Lapentti (semifinals)
3. (United States) Devin Bowen / (Germany) Jens Knippschild (quarterfinals)
4. (Spain) Emilio Benfele Álvarez / (Argentina) Diego del Río (first round)

== Draw ==
=== Key ===
- Q = Qualifier
- WC = Wild card
- LL = Lucky loser
- Alt = Alternate
- ITF = ITF entry
- PR = Protected ranking
- SR = Special ranking
- SE = Special exempt
- JE = Junior exempt
- JR = Junior Accelerator Programme entrant
- CO = College Accelerator Programme entrant
- NG = Next Gen Accelerator Program entrant
- w/o = Walkover
- r = Retired
- d = Defaulted

=== Draw ===
First round
1	(Japan) T Shimada (South Africa) M Wakefield	6	6
WC	(Argentina) G Coria (Argentina) M Zabaleta	0	3
(Russia) Y Schukin (Bulgaria) O Stanoytchev	6	6
(Puerto Rico) J Frontera (Netherlands) S Groen	4	2
4	(Spain) E Benfele Álvarez (Argentina) D del Río	5	6	4
WC	(Netherlands) J Siemerink (Netherlands) R Sluiter	7	2	6
WC	(Netherlands) E Kempes (Netherlands) D van Scheppingen	6	6
(Argentina) G Etlis (France) J Hanquez	3	4
(Argentina) F Browne (Argentina) F Cabello	6^{7}	6	6^{3}
(Argentina) S Roitman (Argentina) A Schneiter	7^{9}	3	7^{7}
(Germany) L Burgsmüller (Russia) A Stoliarov	2	4
3	(United States) D Bowen (Germany) J Knippschild	6	6
(Australia) T Crichton (Australia) A Fisher	6^{4}	4
(Spain) Á Calatrava (United States) A Peterson	7^{7}	6
(New Zealand) J Greenhalgh (Australia) G Silcock	3	2
2	(Australia) W Arthurs (Ecuador) N Lapentti	6	6

Quarterfinals
1	(Japan) T Shimada (South Africa) M Wakefield	3	6	3
(Russia) Y Schukin (Bulgaria) O Stanoytchev	6	3	6
WC	(Netherlands) J Siemerink (Netherlands) R Sluiter	4	5
WC	(Netherlands) E Kempes (Netherlands) D van Scheppingen	6	7
(Argentina) S Roitman (Argentina) A Schneiter	3	7^{7}	6
3	(United States) D Bowen (Germany) J Knippschild	6	6^{4}	3
(Spain) Á Calatrava (United States) A Peterson	3	3
2	(Australia) W Arthurs (Ecuador) N Lapentti	6	6

Semifinals
(Russia) Y Schukin (Bulgaria) O Stanoytchev	4	6	1
WC	(Netherlands) E Kempes (Netherlands) D van Scheppingen	6	3	6
(Argentina) S Roitman (Argentina) A Schneiter	6	7
2	(Australia) W Arthurs (Ecuador) N Lapentti	4	5

Final
WC	(Netherlands) E Kempes (Netherlands) D van Scheppingen	6	4	1
(Argentina) S Roitman (Argentina) A Schneiter	4	6	6
