= 2002 NASDAQ-100 Open – Men's singles =

Men's singles
- 2002 NASDAQ-100 Open

Final
- Champion: (United States) Andre Agassi
- Runner-up: (Switzerland) Roger Federer
- Score: 6–3, 6–3, 3–6, 6–4

Details
- Draw: 96 (12Q / 5WC)
- Seeds: 32

Events
| Singles | men | women |
| Doubles | men | women |
| ← 2001 · | Miami Open | · 2003 → |

Defending champion Andre Agassi defeated Roger Federer in the final, 6–3, 6–3, 3–6, 6–4 to win the men's singles tennis title at the 2002 Miami Open.

== Seeds ==
All thirty-two seeds received a bye to the second round.

1. (Australia) Lleyton Hewitt (semifinals)
2. (Spain) Juan Carlos Ferrero (third round)
3. (Russia) Yevgeny Kafelnikov (third round)
4. (Germany) Tommy Haas (third round)
5. (United Kingdom) Tim Henman (fourth round, retired because of a neck injury)
6. (Russia) Marat Safin (quarterfinals)
7. (France) Sébastien Grosjean (third round)
8. (Sweden) Thomas Johansson (fourth round)
9. (United States) Andre Agassi (champion)
10. (United States) Andy Roddick (second round)
11. (United States) Pete Sampras (third round)
12. (Switzerland) Roger Federer (final)
13. (Czech Republic) Jiří Novák (third round)
14. (Croatia) Goran Ivanišević (second round, retired because of a left shoulder injury)
15. (Argentina) Guillermo Cañas (third round)
16. (Spain) Àlex Corretja (fourth round)
17. (France) Fabrice Santoro (second round)
18. (Sweden) Thomas Enqvist (third round)
19. (Morocco) Younes El Aynaoui (second round)
20. (Ecuador) Nicolás Lapentti (quarterfinals)
21. (Spain) Carlos Moyá (second round)
22. (Morocco) Hicham Arazi (third round)
23. (Spain) Albert Portas (third round)
24. (France) Nicolas Escudé (third round)
25. (Spain) Albert Costa (second round)
26. (Romania) Andrei Pavel (quarterfinals)
27. (United States) Jan-Michael Gambill (third round)
28. (Netherlands) Sjeng Schalken (second round)
29. (Germany) Rainer Schüttler (second round)
30. (Croatia) Ivan Ljubičić (second round)
31. (Chile) Marcelo Ríos (semifinals, retired because of a right knee injury)
32. (Spain) Félix Mantilla (third round)

== Draw ==
=== Key ===
- Q = Qualifier
- WC = Wild card
- LL = Lucky loser
- Alt = Alternate
- SE = Special exempt
- PR = Protected ranking
- ITF = ITF entry
- JE = Junior exempt
- w/o = Walkover
- r = Retired
- d = Defaulted
- SR = Special ranking

=== Finals ===
Quarterfinals
1 | (Australia) Lleyton Hewitt | 2 | 6 | 7^{7}
6 | (Russia) Marat Safin | 6 | 2 | 6^{4}
26 | (Romania) Andrei Pavel | 1 | 1
12 | (Switzerland) Roger Federer | 6 | 6
(Argentina) Juan Ignacio Chela | 6^{0} | 2
31 | (Chile) Marcelo Ríos | 7^{7} | 6
9 | (United States) Andre Agassi | 6 | 7
20 | (Ecuador) Nicolás Lapentti | 3 | 5

Semifinals
1 | (Australia) Lleyton Hewitt | 3 | 4
12 | (Switzerland) Roger Federer | 6 | 6
31 | (Chile) Marcelo Ríos | 7^{9} | 4 | 0^{r}
9 | (United States) Andre Agassi | 6^{7} | 6 | 0

Final
12 | (Switzerland) Roger Federer | 3 | 3 | 6 | 4
9 | (United States) Andre Agassi | 6 | 6 | 3 | 6

=== Top half ===
==== Section 1 ====
First round
WC | (United States) M Chang | 6^{4} | 6 | 6^{5}
(Thailand) P Srichaphan | 7^{7} | 2 | 7^{7}
(Denmark) K Pless | 2 | 1
Q | (Brazil) A Sá | 6 | 6
(Spain) G Blanco | 6^{0} | 5
(United States) J Blake | 7^{7} | 7
(Italy) D Sanguinetti | 6 | 6
(Austria) S Koubek | 3 | 4

Second round
1 | (Australia) L Hewitt | 7^{7} | 7
(Thailand) P Srichaphan | 6^{3} | 5
Q | (Brazil) A Sá | 5 | 3
27 | (United States) J-M Gambill | 7 | 6
17 | (France) F Santoro | 6 | 5 | 3
(United States) J Blake | 2 | 7 | 6
(Italy) D Sanguinetti | 4 | 1^{r}
15 | (Argentina) G Cañas | 6 | 3

Third round
1 | (Australia) L Hewitt | 3 | 6 | 7
27 | (United States) J-M Gambill | 6 | 4 | 5
(United States) J Blake | 6 | 6
15 | (Argentina) G Cañas | 4 | 3

Fourth round
1 | (Australia) L Hewitt | 6 | 6
(United States) J Blake | 4 | 1

==== Section 2 ====
First round
(Argentina) J Acasuso | 4 | 5
(Finland) J Nieminen | 6 | 7
(Belgium) C Rochus | 1 | 2
Q | (Chile) F González | 6 | 6
(Spain) A Martín | 5 | 3
Q | (Peru) L Horna | 7 | 6
(Australia) M Philippoussis | 7 | 4 | 6
WC | (France) C Pioline | 5 | 6 | 3

Second round
11 | (United States) P Sampras | 4 | 6 | 6
(Finland) J Nieminen | 6 | 3 | 2
Q | (Chile) F González | 6 | 6
21 | (Spain) C Moyá | 4 | 2
28 | (Netherlands) S Schalken | 5 | 5
Q | (Peru) L Horna | 7 | 7
(Australia) M Philippoussis | 6^{4} | 1
6 | (Russia) M Safin | 7^{7} | 6

Third round
11 | (United States) P Sampras | 6^{1} | 1
Q | (Chile) F González | 7^{7} | 6
Q | (Peru) L Horna | 6 | 3 | 6^{3}
6 | (Russia) M Safin | 3 | 6 | 7^{7}

Fourth round
Q | (Chile) F González | 3 | 3
6 | (Russia) M Safin | 6 | 6

==== Section 3 ====
First round
(Georgia (country)) I Labadze | 1 | 5
(Belarus) M Mirnyi | 6 | 7
(Germany) N Kiefer | 5 | 6^{6}
(Sweden) J Björkman | 7 | 7^{8}
(France) A Dupuis | 3 | 4
(Spain) F Vicente | 6 | 6
(Argentina) F Squillari | 2 | 6 | 6
(Argentina) D Nalbandian | 6 | 3 | 4

Second round
4 | (Germany) T Haas | 6 | 6
(Belarus) M Mirnyi | 2 | 0
(Sweden) J Björkman | 6^{4} | 6 | 4
26 | (Romania) A Pavel | 7^{7} | 4 | 6
18 | (Sweden) T Enqvist | 6 | 6
(Spain) F Vicente | 2 | 4
(Argentina) F Squillari | 3
14 | (Croatia) G Ivanišević | 4^{r}

Third round
4 | (Germany) T Haas | 6^{6} | 7^{7} | 6^{6}
26 | (Romania) A Pavel | 7^{8} | 6^{5} | 7^{8}
18 | (Sweden) T Enqvist | 1 | 6^{5}
(Argentina) F Squillari | 6 | 7^{7}

Fourth round
26 | (Romania) A Pavel | 1 | 7^{7} | 6
(Argentina) F Squillari | 6 | 6^{5} | 1

==== Section 4 ====
First round
Q | (United States) J Morrison | 6^{5} | 6 | 6
Q | (Netherlands) M Verkerk | 7^{7} | 1 | 4
(Czech Republic) B Ulihrach | 4 | 2
(Czech Republic) J Vacek | 6 | 6
(Spain) A Montañés | 3 | 6 | 6
(Hungary) A Sávolt | 6 | 3 | 2
Q | (Netherlands) R Sluiter | 3 | 5
Q | (Germany) L Burgsmüller | 6 | 7

Second round
12 | (Switzerland) R Federer | 6 | 7^{8}
Q | (United States) J Morrison | 1 | 6^{6}
(Czech Republic) J Vacek | 4 | 7^{7} | 2
23 | (Spain) A Portas | 6 | 6^{2} | 6
32 | (Spain) F Mantilla | 6 | 6
(Spain) A Montañés | 2 | 3
Q | (Germany) L Burgsmüller | 1 | 6 | 3
5 | (United Kingdom) T Henman | 6 | 1 | 6

Third round
12 | (Switzerland) R Federer | 6 | 6
23 | (Spain) A Portas | 4 | 1
32 | (Spain) F Mantilla | 5 | 4
5 | (United Kingdom) T Henman | 7 | 6

Fourth round
12 | (Switzerland) R Federer | 6 | 0
5 | (United Kingdom) T Henman | 2 | 0^{r}

=== Bottom half ===
==== Section 5 ====
First round
Q | (Switzerland) M Rosset | 2 | 6 | 3
(Italy) A Gaudenzi | 6 | 4 | 6
Q | (Switzerland) I Heuberger | 6 | 4 | 2
(Argentina) G Gaudio | 3 | 6 | 6
(Slovakia) K Kučera | 2 | 0
(Brazil) F Meligeni | 6 | 6
(Argentina) J I Chela | 3 | 6 | 7^{7}
WC | (United States) R Ginepri | 6 | 3 | 6^{3}

Second round
7 | (France) S Grosjean | 6 | 6
(Italy) A Gaudenzi | 1 | 4
(Argentina) G Gaudio | 6 | 6
29 | (Germany) R Schüttler | 3 | 3
24 | (France) N Escudé | 6 | 6
(Brazil) F Meligeni | 4 | 4
(Argentina) J I Chela | 6 | 2 | 6
10 | (United States) A Roddick | 3 | 6 | 4

Third round
7 | (France) S Grosjean | 6^{7} | 6 | 1
(Argentina) G Gaudio | 7^{9} | 4 | 6
24 | (France) N Escudé | 3 | 7^{7} | 3
(Argentina) J I Chela | 6 | 6^{5} | 6

Fourth round
(Argentina) G Gaudio | 1 | 7 | 3^{r}
(Argentina) J I Chela | 6 | 5 | 4

==== Section 6 ====
First round
(Belgium) X Malisse | 6 | 5 | 4
Q | (Spain) F López | 0 | 7 | 6
(Spain) F Clavet | 6 | 6
(Argentina) M Zabaleta | 3 | 2
(Switzerland) M Kratochvil | 6 | 5 | 1
WC | (United States) M Fish | 3 | 7 | 6
(Spain) T Robredo | 6 | 1
(Spain) D Sánchez | 2 | 0^{r}

Second round
16 | (Spain) À Corretja | 6 | 6
Q | (Spain) F López | 3 | 4
(Spain) F Clavet | 2 | 5
22 | (Morocco) H Arazi | 6 | 7
31 | (Chile) M Ríos | 6 | 6
WC | (United States) M Fish | 2 | 4
(Spain) T Robredo | 4 | 0
3 | (Russia) Y Kafelnikov | 6 | 6

Third round
16 | (Spain) À Corretja | 4 | 7^{7} | 6
22 | (Morocco) H Arazi | 6 | 6^{3} | 1
31 | (Chile) M Ríos | 6 | 7^{7}
3 | (Russia) Y Kafelnikov | 4 | 6^{4}

Fourth round
16 | (Spain) À Corretja | 2 | 2
31 | (Chile) M Ríos | 6 | 6

==== Section 7 ====
First round
(France) A Clément | 6 | 7
Q | (Belgium) O Rochus | 2 | 5
Q | (Spain) J Balcells | 3 | 6 | 2
(Argentina) G Coria | 6 | 3 | 6
(Paraguay) R Delgado | 6 | 5 | 1
(Argentina) A Calleri | 1 | 7 | 6
(Armenia) S Sargsian | 3 | 4
(United Kingdom) G Rusedski | 6 | 6

Second round
8 | (Sweden) T Johansson | 6 | 6
(France) A Clément | 3 | 4
(Argentina) G Coria | 6 | 6
25 | (Spain) A Costa | 2 | 3
19 | (Morocco) Y El Aynaoui | 5 | 1
(Argentina) A Calleri | 7 | 6
(United Kingdom) G Rusedski | 3 | 1
9 | (United States) A Agassi | 6 | 6

Third round
8 | (Sweden) T Johansson | 6 | 6
(Argentina) G Coria | 1 | 4
(Argentina) A Calleri | 3 | 2
9 | (United States) A Agassi | 6 | 6

Fourth round
8 | (Sweden) T Johansson | 5 | 2
9 | (United States) A Agassi | 7 | 6

==== Section 8 ====
First round
(South Africa) W Ferreira | 6^{3} | 4
(Austria) M Hipfl | 7^{7} | 6
(Russia) N Davydenko | 6 | 6
(Slovakia) D Hrbatý | 3 | 2
(Romania) A Voinea | 6^{6} | 6 | 7
WC | (Croatia) M Ančić | 7^{8} | 3 | 5
(France) J Boutter | 6 | 6^{3} | 6^{7}
(United States) T Martin | 2 | 7^{7} | 7^{9}

Second round
13 | (Czech Republic) J Novák | 7 | 6
(Austria) M Hipfl | 5 | 4
(Russia) N Davydenko | 2 | 4
20 | (Ecuador) N Lapentti | 6 | 6
30 | (Croatia) I Ljubičić | 6 | 6^{8} | 6^{6}
(Romania) A Voinea | 4 | 7^{10} | 7^{8}
(United States) T Martin | 6 | 6^{2} | 3
2 | (Spain) J C Ferrero | 4 | 7^{7} | 6

Third round
13 | (Czech Republic) J Novák | 6^{7} | 6^{4}
20 | (Ecuador) N Lapentti | 7^{9} | 7^{7}
(Romania) A Voinea | 7^{8} | 1 | 6
2 | (Spain) J C Ferrero | 6^{6} | 6 | 2

Fourth round
20 | (Ecuador) N Lapentti | 6 | 3 | 6
(Romania) A Voinea | 2 | 6 | 3

== Qualifying ==
=== Qualifying seeds ===
1. (Chile) Fernando González (qualified)
2. (Belgium) Olivier Rochus (qualified)
3. (Germany) Lars Burgsmüller (qualified)
4. (Brazil) André Sá (qualified)
5. (Spain) Jacobo Díaz (first round)
6. (United States) Michael Russell (qualifying competition)
7. (South Korea) Lee Hyung-taik (first round)
8. (Spain) Joan Balcells (qualified)
9. (United Kingdom) Martin Lee (first round)
10. (United States) Taylor Dent (first round)
11. (Australia) Wayne Arthurs (first round, defaulted)
12. (Brazil) Flávio Saretta (qualifying competition)
13. (Austria) Julian Knowle (qualifying competition)
14. (Israel) Noam Okun (qualifying competition)
15. (Netherlands) Raemon Sluiter (qualified)
16. (France) Michaël Llodra (qualifying competition)
17. (Sweden) Magnus Larsson (first round)
18. (Philippines) Cecil Mamiit (qualifying competition)
19. (Russia) Andrei Stoliarov (qualifying competition)
20. (Switzerland) Marc Rosset (qualified)
21. (Switzerland) Ivo Heuberger (qualified)
22. (United States) Vince Spadea (qualifying competition)
23. (United States) Hugo Armando (first round)
24. (Belgium) Dick Norman (first round)

=== Qualifiers ===
1. (Chile) Fernando González
2. (Belgium) Olivier Rochus
3. (Germany) Lars Burgsmüller
4. (Brazil) André Sá
5. (Spain) Feliciano López
6. (Switzerland) Ivo Heuberger
7. (Switzerland) Marc Rosset
8. (Spain) Joan Balcells
9. (United States) Jeff Morrison
10. (Netherlands) Martin Verkerk
11. (Netherlands) Raemon Sluiter
12. (Peru) Luis Horna

=== Qualifying draw ===
==== First qualifier ====
First round
1 | (Chile) Fernando González | 6 | 6
WC | (United States) Brian Baker | 4 | 2
(United Kingdom) Jamie Delgado | 0 | 6 | 2
14 | (Israel) Noam Okun | 6 | 4 | 6

Qualifying competition
1 | (Chile) Fernando González | 6 | 6
14 | (Israel) Noam Okun | 4 | 4

==== Second qualifier ====
First round
2 | (Belgium) Olivier Rochus | 6 | 3 | 6
(Switzerland) George Bastl | 3 | 6 | 3
(Germany) Oliver Gross | 7 | 6^{2} | 6
23 | (United States) Hugo Armando | 5 | 7^{7} | 0

Qualifying competition
2 | (Belgium) Olivier Rochus | 7 | 6
(Germany) Oliver Gross | 5 | 3

==== Third qualifier ====
First round
3 | (Germany) Lars Burgsmüller | 6 | 6
(Brazil) Alexandre Simoni | 4 | 3
WC | (France) Julien Cassaigne | 1^{r}
18 | (Philippines) Cecil Mamiit | 4

Qualifying competition
3 | (Germany) Lars Burgsmüller | 7 | 6
18 | (Philippines) Cecil Mamiit | 5 | 4

==== Fourth qualifier ====
First round
4 | (Brazil) André Sá | 6 | 6
(United States) Jack Brasington | 3 | 3
(Brazil) Ricardo Mello | 2 | 3
19 | (Russia) Andrei Stoliarov | 6 | 6

Qualifying competition
4 | (Brazil) André Sá | 6 | 7^{7}
19 | (Russia) Andrei Stoliarov | 2 | 6^{3}

==== Fifth qualifier ====
First round
5 | (Spain) Jacobo Díaz | 3 | 1
(Spain) Feliciano López | 6 | 6
(Czech Republic) Ota Fukárek | 3 | 6 | 3
22 | (United States) Vince Spadea | 6 | 1 | 6

Qualifying competition
(Spain) Feliciano López | 7^{7} | 7
22 | (United States) Vince Spadea | 6^{2} | 5

==== Sixth qualifier ====
First round
6 | (United States) Michael Russell | 6 | 4 | 6
WC | (United States) Alex Kim | 2 | 6 | 2
WC | (United States) Alex Bogomolov Jr. | 0 | 7^{7} | 4
21 | (Switzerland) Ivo Heuberger | 6 | 6^{3} | 6

Qualifying competition
6 | (United States) Michael Russell | 3 | 4
21 | (Switzerland) Ivo Heuberger | 6 | 6

==== Seventh qualifier ====
First round
7 | (South Korea) Lee Hyung-taik | 3 | 6 | 3
(Netherlands) Peter Wessels | 6 | 4 | 6
(France) Paul-Henri Mathieu | 3 | 2
20 | (Switzerland) Marc Rosset | 6 | 6

Qualifying competition
(Netherlands) Peter Wessels | 4 | r
20 | (Switzerland) Marc Rosset | 6

==== Eighth qualifier ====
First round
8 | (Spain) Joan Balcells | 6 | 6
WC | (United States) Jeff Salzenstein | 3 | 3
(Spain) Marc López | 4 | 6 | 2
13 | (Austria) Julian Knowle | 6 | 3 | 6

Qualifying competition
8 | (Spain) Joan Balcells | 6 | 7
13 | (Austria) Julian Knowle | 4 | 5

==== Ninth qualifier ====
First round
9 | (United Kingdom) Martin Lee | 4 | 0
(United States) Jeff Morrison | 6 | 6
(Germany) Tomas Behrend | 2 | 3
16 | (France) Michaël Llodra | 6 | 6

Qualifying competition
(United States) Jeff Morrison | 6 | 6
16 | (France) Michaël Llodra | 4 | 3

==== Tenth qualifier ====
First round
10 | (United States) Taylor Dent | 4 | 2
(Netherlands) Dennis van Scheppingen | 6 | 6
(Netherlands) Martin Verkerk | 1 | 7 | 6
17 | (Sweden) Magnus Larsson | 6 | 5 | 4

Qualifying competition
(Netherlands) Dennis van Scheppingen | 4 | 6^{4}
(Netherlands) Martin Verkerk | 6 | 7^{7}

==== Eleventh qualifier ====
First round
11 | (Australia) Wayne Arthurs | 2 | 7 | 4^{d}
(Italy) Stefano Galvani | 6 | 5 | 5
(Netherlands) Edwin Kempes | 6^{7} | 7 | 4
15 | (Netherlands) Raemon Sluiter | 7^{9} | 5 | 6

Qualifying competition
(Italy) Stefano Galvani | 6 | 3 | 4
15 | (Netherlands) Raemon Sluiter | 1 | 6 | 6

==== Twelfth qualifier ====
First round
12 | (Brazil) Flávio Saretta | 6 | 2 | 7
(Germany) Michael Kohlmann | 4 | 6 | 5
(Peru) Luis Horna | 3 | 6 | 6
24 | (Belgium) Dick Norman | 6 | 3 | 4

Qualifying competition
12 | (Brazil) Flávio Saretta | 5 | 1
(Peru) Luis Horna | 7 | 6
