= 2000 Energis Dutch Open – Singles =

Tennis tournament

Singles
- 2000 Dutch Open

Final
- Champion: (Sweden) Magnus Gustafsson
- Runner-up: (Netherlands) Raemon Sluiter
- Score: 6–7^{(4–7)}, 6–3, 7–6^{(7–5)}, 6–1

Details
- Draw: 32
- Seeds: 8

Events
Singles	Doubles
- Dutch Open

Younes El Aynaoui was the defending champion, but the Moroccan did not compete. Magnus Gustafsson won in the final 6–7^{(4–7)}, 6–3, 7–6^{(7–5)}, 6–1 against unseeded Raemon Sluiter and captured the fourteenth and last title of his professional career.

== Seeds ==
1. (Ecuador) Nicolás Lapentti (first round)
2. (Argentina) Mariano Zabaleta (first round)
3. (France) Arnaud Di Pasquale (second round)
4. (Sweden) Magnus Gustafsson (champion)
5. (Australia) Richard Fromberg (second round)
6. (Chile) Nicolás Massú (quarterfinals)
7. (Brazil) André Sá (first round)
8. (Romania) Adrian Voinea (second round)

== Draw ==
Key

- Q = Qualifier
- WC = Wild card
- LL = Lucky loser
- Alt = Alternate
- ITF = ITF entry
- PR = Protected ranking
- SR = Special ranking
- SE = Special exempt
- JE = Junior exempt
- JR = Junior Accelerator Programme entrant
- CO = College Accelerator Programme entrant
- NG = Next Gen Accelerator Program entrant
- w/o = Walkover
- r = Retired
- d = Defaulted

=== Finals ===
Semifinals
WC	(Netherlands) Edwin Kempes	4	4
4	(Sweden) Magnus Gustafsson	6	6
(Netherlands) Raemon Sluiter	6	7^{7}
Q	(Russia) Nikolay Davydenko	2	6^{5}

Final
4	(Sweden) Magnus Gustafsson	6^{4}	6	7^{7}	6
(Netherlands) Raemon Sluiter	7^{7}	3	6^{5}	1

=== Section 1 ===
First round
1	(Ecuador) N Lapentti	2	5
(Norway) C Ruud	6	7
(Argentina) F Browne	6	6
(France) S Huet	4	4
WC	(Netherlands) E Kempes	6	6
(Haiti) R Agénor	2	4
8	(Romania) A Voinea	7	6
(Bulgaria) O Stanoytchev	5	2
(Argentina) G Etlis	2	2
4	(Sweden) M Gustafsson	6	6	WC
(Netherlands) D van Scheppingen	6	7^{7}
(Australia) W Arthurs	2	6^{4}
Q	(Chile) A García	6	6
LL	(Finland) K Tiilikainen	0	2
PR	(Uruguay) M Filippini	4	5
6	(Chile) N Massú	6	7

Second round
(Norway) C Ruud	6	6
(Argentina) F Browne	4	3
WC	(Netherlands) E Kempes	6	6
8	(Romania) A Voinea	2	2
4	(Sweden) M Gustafsson	6	7^{7}
WC	(Netherlands) D van Scheppingen	3	6^{5}
Q	(Chile) A García	1	1
6	(Chile) N Massú	6	6

Quarterfinals
(Norway) C Ruud	6	6^{5}	3
WC	(Netherlands) E Kempes	4	7^{7}	6
4	(Sweden) M Gustafsson	6	3	6
6	(Chile) N Massú	3	6	1

Semifinals
WC	(Netherlands) E Kempes	4	4
4	(Sweden) M Gustafsson	6	6

=== Section 2 ===
First round
5	(Australia) R Fromberg	6	6
(Russia) A Stoliarov	2	3
(Spain) Á Calatrava	6	4	6
WC	(Netherlands) M Verkerk	4	6	3
(Netherlands) R Sluiter	6	4	6
(Germany) J Knippschild	2	6	3
Q	(France) R Cadart	3	3
3	(France) A Di Pasquale	6	6
Q	(Argentina) S Roitman	3	7^{7}	6
7	(Brazil) A Sá	6	6^{3}	4
(Germany) T Behrend	6	6
(France) T Guardiola	3	4
(Netherlands) J Siemerink	7^{7}	6
(Spain) E Álvarez	6^{4}	4
Q	(Russia) N Davydenko	3	6	7^{9}
2	(Argentina) M Zabaleta	6	2	6^{7}

Second round
5	(Australia) R Fromberg	6^{4}	6^{4}
(Spain) Á Calatrava	7^{7}	7^{7}
(Netherlands) R Sluiter	3	7^{7}	7^{7}
3	(France) A Di Pasquale	6	6^{5}	6^{5}
Q	(Argentina) S Roitman	6	2
(Germany) T Behrend	7	6
(Netherlands) J Siemerink	3	6	1
Q	(Russia) N Davydenko	6	3	6

Quarterfinals
(Spain) Á Calatrava	6^{4}	4
(Netherlands) R Sluiter	7^{7}	6
(Germany) T Behrend	2	6	4
Q	(Russia) N Davydenko	6	1	6

Semifinals
(Netherlands) R Sluiter	6	7^{7}
Q	(Russia) N Davydenko	2	6^{5}
