= 2000 Energis Dutch Open =

2000 Dutch Open
- Date: 17–23 July
- Edition: 43rd
- Category: ATP International Series
- Draw: 32S / 16D
- Prize money: $375,000
- Surface: Clay / outdoor
- Location: Amsterdam, Netherlands

Champions

Singles
- (Sweden) Magnus Gustafsson

Doubles
- (Argentina) Sergio Roitman / (Argentina) Andrés Schneiter
- Dutch Open

The 2000 Dutch Open was an ATP men's tennis tournament staged in Amsterdam, Netherlands and played on outdoor clay courts. It was the 43rd edition of the tournament and was held from 17 July until 23 July 2000. Fourth-seeded Magnus Gustafsson won the singles title.

== Finals ==
=== Singles ===
(Sweden) Magnus Gustafsson defeated (Netherlands) Raemon Sluiter, 6–7^{(4–7)}, 6–3, 7–6^{(7–5)}, 6–1

- It was Gustafsson's only singles title of the year and the 14th and last of his career.

=== Doubles ===
(Argentina) Sergio Roitman / (Argentina) Andrés Schneiter defeated (Netherlands) Edwin Kempes / (Netherlands) Dennis van Scheppingen 4–6, 6–4, 6–1
