= 2003 NASDAQ-100 Open – Men's singles =

Men's singles
- 2003 NASDAQ-100 Open

Final
- Champion: (United States) Andre Agassi
- Runner-up: (Spain) Carlos Moyá
- Score: 6–3, 6–3

Details
- Draw: 96 (12Q / 5WC / 1LL)
- Seeds: 32

Events
Singles	men	women
Doubles	men	women
← 2002 ·	Miami Open	· 2004 →

Two-time defending champion Andre Agassi defeated Carlos Moyá in the final, 6–3, 6–3 to win the men's singles tennis title at the 2003 Miami Open.

== Seeds ==
All thirty-two seeds received a bye to the second round.

1. (Australia) Lleyton Hewitt (second round)
2. (United States) Andre Agassi (champion)
3. (Spain) Juan Carlos Ferrero (third round)
4. (Switzerland) Roger Federer (quarterfinals)
5. (Spain) Carlos Moyá (final)
6. (United States) Andy Roddick (third round)
7. (Russia) Marat Safin (second round)
8. (Czech Republic) Jiří Novák (second round)
9. (Spain) Albert Costa (semifinals)
10. (Argentina) David Nalbandian (third round)
11. (France) Sébastien Grosjean (second round)
12. (Germany) Rainer Schüttler (third round)
13. (Thailand) Paradorn Srichaphan (semifinals)
14. (Netherlands) Sjeng Schalken (fourth round)
15. (Brazil) Gustavo Kuerten (second round)
16. (Spain) Àlex Corretja (second round)
17. (Argentina) Gastón Gaudio (second round)
18. (United Kingdom) Tim Henman (second round)
19. (Morocco) Younes El Aynaoui (quarterfinals)
20. (Chile) Fernando González (second round)
21. (United States) James Blake (third round)
22. (Spain) Tommy Robredo (second round)
23. (Russia) Mikhail Youzhny (second round)
24. (Russia) Yevgeny Kafelnikov (third round)
25. (Belgium) Xavier Malisse (second round)
26. (Argentina) Guillermo Coria (fourth round)
27. (Romania) Andrei Pavel (second round)
28. (Chile) Marcelo Ríos (fourth round, withdrew because of a back injury)
29. (South Africa) Wayne Ferreira (third round)
30. (Argentina) Juan Ignacio Chela (third round)
31. (Belarus) Max Mirnyi (second round)
32. (Finland) Jarkko Nieminen (third round)

== Draw ==
=== Key ===
- Q = Qualifier
- WC = Wild card
- LL = Lucky loser
- Alt = Alternate
- SE = Special exempt
- PR = Protected ranking
- ITF = ITF entry
- JE = Junior exempt
- w/o = Walkover
- r = Retired
- d = Defaulted
- SR = Special ranking

=== Finals ===
Quarterfinals
WC	(United States) Robby Ginepri	7^{7}	3	6^{4}
5	(Spain) Carlos Moyá	6^{5}	6	7^{7}
13	(Thailand) Paradorn Srichaphan	6	6^{5}	7
(United States) Todd Martin	3	7^{7}	5
9	(Spain) Albert Costa	7^{7}	4	7^{9}
4	(Switzerland) Roger Federer	6^{4}	6	6^{7}
19	(Morocco) Younes El Aynaoui	6^{6}	6	1
2	(United States) Andre Agassi	7^{8}	4	6

Semifinals
5	(Spain) Carlos Moyá	6	6
13	(Thailand) Paradorn Srichaphan	4	2
9	(Spain) Albert Costa	2	4
2	(United States) Andre Agassi	6	6

Final
5	(Spain) Carlos Moyá	3	3
2	(United States) Andre Agassi	6	6

=== Top half ===
==== Section 1 ====
First round
(Belarus) V Voltchkov	0	0^{r}
Q	(Spain) F Clavet	6	3
(France) P-H Mathieu	1	6	1
(South Korea) H-T Lee	6	1	6
(Brazil) F Meligeni	6	6
(Switzerland) M Kratochvil	1	4
WC	(United States) R Ginepri	7	6
(Australia) W Arthurs	5	3

Second round
1	(Australia) L Hewitt	4	4
Q	(Spain) F Clavet	6	6
(South Korea) H-T Lee	6^{6}	6	6
25	(Belgium) X Malisse	7^{8}	2	1
21	(United States) J Blake	7^{7}	6
(Brazil) F Meligeni	6^{5}	2
WC	(United States) R Ginepri	4	7^{7}	6
16	(Spain) À Corretja	6	6^{5}	2

Third round
Q	(Spain) F Clavet	6	2	1
(South Korea) H-T Lee	4	6	6
21	(United States) J Blake	3	2
WC	(United States) R Ginepri	6	6

Fourth round
(South Korea) H-T Lee	3	2
WC	(United States) R Ginepri	6	6

==== Section 2 ====
First round
(United States) M Fish	0	6	6
(Romania) A Voinea	6	4	2
(Slovakia) D Hrbatý	6^{2}	6	4
(France) N Escudé	7^{7}	4	6
(Slovakia) K Kučera	2	0^{r}
Q	(Spain) F Verdasco	6	4
(United States) V Spadea	6	6
Q	(Belgium) C Rochus	3	4

Second round
11	(France) S Grosjean	4	6^{3}
(United States) M Fish	6	7^{7}
(France) N Escudé	6	6
18	(United Kingdom) T Henman	3	4
31	(Belarus) M Mirnyi	6	6^{5}	4
Q	(Spain) F Verdasco	1	7^{7}	6
(United States) V Spadea	4	7	4
5	(Spain) C Moyá	6	5	6

Third round
(United States) M Fish	5	3
(France) N Escudé	7	6
Q	(Spain) F Verdasco	6^{5}	3
5	(Spain) C Moyá	7^{7}	6

Fourth round
(France) N Escudé	4	6^{8}
5	(Spain) C Moyá	6	7^{10}

==== Section 3 ====
First round
(Spain) F Vicente	6	7
Q	(Russia) A Stoliarov	4	5
(Netherlands) R Krajicek	4	3
(United States) T Dent	6	6
Q	(Sweden) J Björkman	3	6	6
(Brazil) A Sá	6	4	4
(Argentina) J Acasuso	6	6
(Spain) D Ferrer	3	4

Second round
3	(Spain) J C Ferrero	6	6
(Spain) F Vicente	2	2
(United States) T Dent	1	1
28	(Chile) M Ríos	6	6
24	(Russia) Y Kafelnikov	6	6
Q	(Sweden) J Björkman	3	3
(Argentina) J Acasuso	4	6^{5}
13	(Thailand) P Srichaphan	6	7^{7}

Third round
3	(Spain) J C Ferrero	3	6^{2}
28	(Chile) M Ríos	6	7^{7}
24	(Russia) Y Kafelnikov	3	7^{9}	3
13	(Thailand) P Srichaphan	6	6^{7}	6

Fourth round
28	(Chile) M Ríos
13	(Thailand) P Srichaphan	w/o

==== Section 4 ====
First round
(United States) J-M Gambill	2	6	6
(Austria) S Koubek	6	3	2
(Czech Republic) R Štěpánek	6	6
WC	(United States) A Bogomolov Jr.	2	3
(United States) T Martin	6	6
(Argentina) M Zabaleta	4	4
(Croatia) I Ljubičić	6^{4}	4
Q	(France) C Saulnier	7^{7}	6

Second round
12	(Germany) R Schüttler	6	6
(United States) J-M Gambill	2	3
(Czech Republic) R Štěpánek	6	6
23	(Russia) M Youzhny	3	3
27	(Romania) A Pavel	7^{7}	4	0^{r}
(United States) T Martin	6^{2}	6	2
Q	(France) C Saulnier	7^{7}	6^{2}	4
6	(United States) A Roddick	6^{1}	7^{7}	6

Third round
12	(Germany) R Schüttler	4	4
(Czech Republic) R Štěpánek	6	6
(United States) T Martin	7^{7}	6
6	(United States) A Roddick	6^{3}	4

Fourth round
(Czech Republic) R Štěpánek	3	2
(United States) T Martin	6	6

=== Bottom half ===
==== Section 5 ====
First round
(Italy) D Sanguinetti	6	6
(Spain) A Montañés	4	1
(France) A Dupuis	6	6
(Netherlands) R Sluiter	3	4
(Denmark) K Carlsen	4	3
(Chile) N Massú	6	6
(Belgium) O Rochus	3	7	6
Q	(Czech Republic) J Vacek	6	5	1

Second round
7	(Russia) M Safin	6^{9}	5
(Italy) D Sanguinetti	7^{11}	7
(France) A Dupuis	0	4
26	(Argentina) G Coria	6	6
17	(Argentina) G Gaudio	4	7	3
(Chile) N Massú	6	5	6
(Belgium) O Rochus	3	2
9	(Spain) A Costa	6	6

Third round
(Italy) D Sanguinetti	3	6^{4}
26	(Argentina) G Coria	6	7^{7}
(Chile) N Massú	6^{6}	2
9	(Spain) A Costa	7^{8}	6

Fourth round
26	(Argentina) G Coria	5	6	3
9	(Spain) A Costa	7	3	6

==== Section 6 ====
First round
Q	(France) J-R Lisnard	3	6	2
WC	(France) R Gasquet	6	1	1^{r}
(Argentina) F Squillari	6^{5}	7^{7}	6
(Croatia) M Ančić	7^{7}	6^{4}	4
(Netherlands) M Verkerk	5	7	7^{7}
(Armenia) S Sargsian	7	5	6^{1}
Q	(Peru) L Horna	6	6
(Russia) N Davydenko	3	4

Second round
14	(Netherlands) S Schalken	6	6
Q	(France) J-R Lisnard	3	4
(Argentina) F Squillari	6	6
22	(Spain) T Robredo	3	4
30	(Argentina) J I Chela	6^{5}	6	6
(Netherlands) M Verkerk	7^{7}	3	4
Q	(Peru) L Horna	2	5
4	(Switzerland) R Federer	6	7

Third round
14	(Netherlands) S Schalken	6	7
(Argentina) F Squillari	4	5
30	(Argentina) J I Chela	1	6	1
4	(Switzerland) R Federer	6	3	6

Fourth round
14	(Netherlands) S Schalken	3	2
4	(Switzerland) R Federer	6	6

==== Section 7 ====
First round
(Ecuador) N Lapentti	4	6	7^{7}
Q	(Slovakia) K Beck	6	4	6^{4}
(Spain) F Mantilla	6	6
(Germany) L Burgsmüller	3	1
(Spain) D Sánchez	1	4
(Argentina) A Calleri	6	6
(Spain) A Martín	3	1
LL	(Brazil) F Saretta	6	6

Second round
8	(Czech Republic) J Novák	6	3	4
(Ecuador) N Lapentti	2	6	6
(Spain) F Mantilla	4	1
29	(South Africa) W Ferreira	6	6
19	(Morocco) Y El Aynaoui	6	6
(Argentina) A Calleri	1	4
LL	(Brazil) F Saretta	6	4	1
10	(Argentina) D Nalbandian	4	6	6

Third round
(Ecuador) N Lapentti	6	6
29	(South Africa) W Ferreira	4	2
19	(Morocco) Y El Aynaoui	6	4	6
10	(Argentina) D Nalbandian	3	6	4

Fourth round
(Ecuador) N Lapentti	0	6^{7}
19	(Morocco) Y El Aynaoui	6	7^{9}

==== Section 8 ====
First round
Q	(France) M Llodra	4	7^{7}	3
(Sweden) T Enqvist	6	6^{5}	6
(Spain) F López	6^{5}	4
WC	(Australia) M Philippoussis	7^{7}	6
Q	(Australia) P Luczak	4	4
(France) A Clément	6	6
(Germany) N Kiefer	2	2
WC	(United States) M Chang	6	6

Second round
15	(Brazil) G Kuerten	3	4
(Sweden) T Enqvist	6	6
WC	(Australia) M Philippoussis	7^{7}	6
20	(Chile) F González	6^{5}	4
32	(Finland) J Nieminen	6	6
(France) A Clément	2	1
WC	(United States) M Chang	4	2
2	(United States) A Agassi	6	6

Third round
(Sweden) T Enqvist	7^{8}	6^{3}	3
WC	(Australia) M Philippoussis	6^{6}	7^{7}	6
32	(Finland) J Nieminen	2	0
2	(United States) A Agassi	6	6

Fourth round
WC	(Australia) M Philippoussis	6	3	2
2	(United States) A Agassi	4	6	6

== Qualifying ==
=== Qualifying seeds ===
1. (Sweden) Jonas Björkman (qualified)
2. (Slovakia) Karol Beck (qualified)
3. (Peru) Luis Horna (qualified)
4. (Brazil) Flávio Saretta (qualifying competition, lucky loser)
5. (France) Jean-René Lisnard (qualified)
6. (United States) Justin Gimelstob (qualifying competition)
7. (Sweden) Magnus Norman (qualifying competition)
8. (Morocco) Hicham Arazi (first round)
9. (Austria) Jürgen Melzer (first round)
10. (Georgia (country)) Irakli Labadze (qualifying competition)
11. (Germany) Alexander Waske (first round)
12. (United States) Jeff Morrison (qualifying competition, retired)
13. (Philippines) Cecil Mamiit (qualifying competition)
14. (Belgium) Kristof Vliegen (qualifying competition)
15. (Switzerland) Marc Rosset (first round)
16. (France) Michaël Llodra (qualified)
17. (Czech Republic) Jan Vacek (qualified)
18. (Peru) Iván Miranda (first round)
19. (Australia) Scott Draper (first round)
20. (United States) Robert Kendrick (qualifying competition)
21. (Brazil) Ricardo Mello (first round)
22. (Russia) Andrei Stoliarov (qualified)
23. (France) Cyril Saulnier (qualified)
24. (Belgium) Christophe Rochus (qualified)

=== Qualifiers ===
1. (Sweden) Jonas Björkman
2. (Slovakia) Karol Beck
3. (Peru) Luis Horna
4. (France) Michaël Llodra
5. (France) Jean-René Lisnard
6. (Czech Republic) Jan Vacek
7. (Belgium) Christophe Rochus
8. (Australia) Peter Luczak
9. (Spain) Francisco Clavet
10. (Russia) Andrei Stoliarov
11. (Spain) Fernando Verdasco
12. (France) Cyril Saulnier

=== Lucky loser ===
1. (Brazil) Flávio Saretta

=== Qualifying draw ===
==== First qualifier ====
First round
1	(Sweden) Jonas Björkman	6	4	6
(Switzerland) Ivo Heuberger	2	6	3
(Czech Republic) Tomáš Zíb	6	7^{7}
18	(Peru) Iván Miranda	3	6^{4}

Qualifying competition
1	(Sweden) Jonas Björkman	6	3	6
(Czech Republic) Tomáš Zíb	1	6	3

==== Second qualifier ====
First round
2	(Slovakia) Karol Beck	6	2	6
(Austria) Julian Knowle	3	6	4
(Germany) Oliver Gross	1	1^{r}
20	(United States) Robert Kendrick	6	0

Qualifying competition
2	(Slovakia) Karol Beck	7^{7}	7
20	(United States) Robert Kendrick	6^{2}	5

==== Third qualifier ====
First round
3	(Peru) Luis Horna	6	6
(United Kingdom) Arvind Parmar	1	2
(United States) Hugo Armando	6	3	6
15	(Switzerland) Marc Rosset	1	6	3

Qualifying competition
3	(Peru) Luis Horna	4	7	6
(United States) Hugo Armando	6	5	2

==== Fourth qualifier ====
First round
4	(Brazil) Flávio Saretta	6	4	6
(Germany) Michael Kohlmann	2	6	4
(Switzerland) George Bastl	0	6^{2}
16	(France) Michaël Llodra	6	7^{7}

Qualifying competition
4	(Brazil) Flávio Saretta	6	4	6^{7}
16	(France) Michaël Llodra	2	6	7^{9}

==== Fifth qualifier ====
First round
5	(France) Jean-René Lisnard	6	6
WC	(United States) Matías Boeker	3	2
WC	(United States) Rajeev Ram	4	7^{8}	6
21	(Brazil) Ricardo Mello	6	6^{6}	0

Qualifying competition
5	(France) Jean-René Lisnard	6	6
WC	(United States) Rajeev Ram	4	2

==== Sixth qualifier ====
First round
6	(United States) Justin Gimelstob	6^{2}	6	6
(United States) Jack Brasington	7^{7}	2	3
WC	(Ecuador) Giovanni Lapentti	6	3	0^{r}
17	(Czech Republic) Jan Vacek	3	6	2

Qualifying competition
6	(United States) Justin Gimelstob	0	2
17	(Czech Republic) Jan Vacek	6	6

==== Seventh qualifier ====
First round
7	(Sweden) Magnus Norman	7^{7}	5	6
(Croatia) Lovro Zovko	6^{5}	7	1
(Germany) Björn Phau	6^{3}	2
24	(Belgium) Christophe Rochus	7^{7}	6

Qualifying competition
7	(Sweden) Magnus Norman	2	6^{3}
24	(Belgium) Christophe Rochus	6	7^{7}

==== Eighth qualifier ====
First round
8	(Morocco) Hicham Arazi	0	6	5
(Australia) Peter Luczak	6	3	7
WC	(United States) Brian Baker	1	6^{6}
13	(Philippines) Cecil Mamiit	6	7^{8}

Qualifying competition
(Australia) Peter Luczak	7	6
13	(Philippines) Cecil Mamiit	5	2

==== Ninth qualifier ====
First round
9	(Austria) Jürgen Melzer	5	1
(Spain) Francisco Clavet	7	6
(Germany) Maximilian Abel	4	3
14	(Belgium) Kristof Vliegen	6	6

Qualifying competition
(Spain) Francisco Clavet	6	7^{7}
14	(Belgium) Kristof Vliegen	1	6^{5}

==== Tenth qualifier ====
First round
10	(Georgia (country)) Irakli Labadze	1	7	6
(Sweden) Magnus Larsson	6	5	3
WC	(United States) Brendan Evans	4	7	1
22	(Russia) Andrei Stoliarov	6	5	6

Qualifying competition
10	(Georgia (country)) Irakli Labadze	3	1
22	(Russia) Andrei Stoliarov	6	6

==== Eleventh qualifier ====
First round
11	(Germany) Alexander Waske	4	2
(Spain) Fernando Verdasco	6	6
(United States) Alex Kim	6	6^{6}	6
19	(Australia) Scott Draper	3	7^{8}	2

Qualifying competition
(Spain) Fernando Verdasco	6	3	6
(United States) Alex Kim	3	6	3

==== Twelfth qualifier ====
First round
12	(United States) Jeff Morrison	6	6
(France) Jean-François Bachelot	3	0
(Philippines) Eric Taino	6^{3}	6	6^{2}
23	(France) Cyril Saulnier	7^{7}	3	7^{7}

Qualifying competition
12	(United States) Jeff Morrison	3	0^{r}
23	(France) Cyril Saulnier	6	1
