= 2001 Ericsson Open – Men's singles =

Men's singles
- 2001 Ericsson Open

Final
- Champion: (United States) Andre Agassi
- Runner-up: (United States) Jan-Michael Gambill
- Score: 7–6^{(7–4)}, 6–1, 6–0

Details
- Draw: 96 (12Q / 5WC / 1LL)
- Seeds: 32

Events
| Singles | men | women |
| Doubles | men | women |
- Miami Open

Andre Agassi defeated Jan-Michael Gambill in the final, 7–6^{(7–4)}, 6–1, 6–0 to win the men's singles tennis title at the 2001 Miami Open. With the win, he completed the Sunshine Double.

Pete Sampras was the defending champion, but lost in the third round to wildcard Andy Roddick.

== Seeds ==
All thirty-two seeds received a bye to the second round.

1. (Brazil) Gustavo Kuerten (third round)
2. (Russia) Marat Safin (second round)
3. (United States) Andre Agassi (champion)
4. (United States) Pete Sampras (third round)
5. (Russia) Yevgeny Kafelnikov (third round)
6. (Sweden) Magnus Norman (third round)
7. (Australia) Lleyton Hewitt (semifinals)
8. (Australia) Patrick Rafter (semifinals)
9. (United Kingdom) Tim Henman (second round)
10. (Spain) Àlex Corretja (fourth round)
11. (France) Arnaud Clément (third round)
12. (Spain) Juan Carlos Ferrero (fourth round)
13. (Slovakia) Dominik Hrbatý (third round)
14. (Sweden) Thomas Enqvist (third round)
15. (France) Sébastien Grosjean (third round)
16. (Australia) Mark Philippoussis (third round)
17. (South Africa) Wayne Ferreira (second round)
18. (Argentina) Franco Squillari (second round)
19. (United States) Jan-Michael Gambill (final)
20. (France) Cédric Pioline (second round)
21. (Romania) Andrei Pavel (fourth round)
22. (Spain) Carlos Moyá (fourth round)
23. (Germany) Tommy Haas (fourth round, withdrew because of a foot injury)
24. (Switzerland) Roger Federer (quarterfinals)
25. (Sweden) Thomas Johansson (fourth round)
26. (Chile) Marcelo Ríos (second round)
27. (Belarus) Vladimir Voltchkov (second round)
28. (Ecuador) Nicolás Lapentti (third round)
29. (Spain) Francisco Clavet (third round)
30. (Germany) David Prinosil (third round)
31. (Argentina) Gastón Gaudio (quarterfinals)
32. (France) Nicolas Escudé (second round)

== Draw ==
Key

- Q = Qualifier
- WC = Wild card
- LL = Lucky loser
- Alt = Alternate
- ITF = ITF entry
- PR = Protected ranking
- SR = Special ranking
- SE = Special exempt
- JE = Junior exempt
- JR = Junior Accelerator Programme entrant
- CO = College Accelerator Programme entrant
- NG = Next Gen Accelerator Program entrant
- w/o = Walkover
- r = Retired
- d = Defaulted

=== Finals ===
Quarterfinals
24 | (Switzerland) Roger Federer | 3 | 1
8 | (Australia) Patrick Rafter | 6 | 6
3 | (United States) Andre Agassi | 6 | 6
LL | (Croatia) Ivan Ljubičić | 4 | 4
7 | (Australia) Lleyton Hewitt | 6 | 6
WC | (United States) Andy Roddick | 3 | 2
31 | (Argentina) Gastón Gaudio | 6 | 5 | 4
19 | (United States) Jan-Michael Gambill | 3 | 7 | 6

Semifinals
8 | (Australia) Patrick Rafter | 0 | 7^{7} | 2
3 | (United States) Andre Agassi | 6 | 6^{2} | 6
7 | (Australia) Lleyton Hewitt | 5 | 4
19 | (United States) Jan-Michael Gambill | 7 | 6

Final
3 | (United States) Andre Agassi | 7^{7} | 6 | 6
19 | (United States) Jan-Michael Gambill | 6^{4} | 1 | 0

=== Top half ===
==== Section 1 ====
First round
(Switzerland) M Rosset | 3 | 6^{9}
(Morocco) H Arazi | 6 | 7^{11}
WC | (United States) C Woodruff | 7^{7} | 6
Q | (Brazil) F Meligeni | 6^{5} | 3
(Morocco) Y El Aynaoui | 7^{7} | 4 | 7^{7}
(Ukraine) A Medvedev | 6^{2} | 6 | 6^{3}
(Spain) A Portas | 2 | 3
(United States) M Chang | 6 | 6

Second round
1 | (Brazil) G Kuerten | 6 | 6^{3} | 6
(Morocco) H Arazi | 1 | 7^{7} | 4
WC | (United States) C Woodruff | 6 | 2 | 1
25 | (Sweden) T Johansson | 4 | 6 | 6
24 | (Switzerland) R Federer | 6 | 6
(Morocco) Y El Aynaoui | 2 | 2
(United States) M Chang | 6^{2} | 4
16 | (Australia) M Philippoussis | 7^{7} | 6

Third round
1 | (Brazil) G Kuerten | 3 | 6 | 4
25 | (Sweden) T Johansson | 6 | 4 | 6
24 | (Switzerland) R Federer | 3 | 7^{7} | 6
16 | (Australia) M Philippoussis | 6 | 6^{4} | 2

Fourth round
25 | (Sweden) T Johansson | 6^{3} | 7 | 6^{7}
24 | (Switzerland) R Federer | 7^{7} | 5 | 7^{9}

==== Section 2 ====
First round
(Italy) G Pozzi | 6 | 3
(Argentina) J I Chela | 0 | 0^{r}
(France) J Golmard | 7 | 1 | 6
(Slovakia) K Kučera | 5 | 6 | 4
(France) A Di Pasquale | 6 | 1 | 2
(Spain) A Martín | 2 | 6 | 6
Q | (United States) B Bryan | 7 | 6^{7} | 6
Q | (United States) R Ginepri | 5 | 7^{9} | 2

Second round
10 | (Spain) À Corretja | 6^{3} | 6 | 6
(Italy) G Pozzi | 7^{7} | 3 | 3
(France) J Golmard | 7 | 7^{7}
20 | (France) C Pioline | 5 | 6^{3}
29 | (Spain) F Clavet | 6 | 6^{6} | 6
(Spain) A Martín | 0 | 7^{8} | 3
Q | (United States) B Bryan | 2 | 1
8 | (Australia) P Rafter | 6 | 6

Third round
10 | (Spain) À Corretja | 7^{7} | 7^{8}
(France) J Golmard | 6^{1} | 6^{6}
29 | (Spain) F Clavet | 3 | 6 | 3
8 | (Australia) P Rafter | 6 | 3 | 6

Fourth round
10 | (Spain) À Corretja | 4 | 3
8 | (Australia) P Rafter | 6 | 6

==== Section 3 ====
First round
(Netherlands) S Schalken | 2 | 6^{2}
WC | (United States) T Dent | 6 | 7^{7}
(Chile) N Massú | 4 | 1
(United Kingdom) G Rusedski | 6 | 6
(Australia) W Arthurs | 6 | 7^{8}
Q | (Argentina) D Nalbandian | 3 | 6^{6}
Q | (Switzerland) G Bastl | 7 | 6
Q | (Australia) R Fromberg | 5 | 4

Second round
3 | (United States) A Agassi | 6 | 6
WC | (United States) T Dent | 4 | 2
(United Kingdom) G Rusedski | 3 | 2
30 | (Germany) D Prinosil | 6 | 6
23 | (Germany) T Haas | 3 | 7^{7} | 6
(Australia) W Arthurs | 6 | 6^{3} | 3
Q | (Switzerland) G Bastl | 6^{4} | 4
13 | (Slovakia) D Hrbatý | 7^{7} | 6

Third round
3 | (United States) A Agassi | 6 | 6
30 | (Germany) D Prinosil | 1 | 3
23 | (Germany) T Haas | 6^{4} | 6 | 6
13 | (Slovakia) D Hrbatý | 7^{7} | 0 | 3

Fourth round
3 | (United States) A Agassi | w/o
23 | (Germany) T Haas

==== Section 4 ====
First round
(Czech Republic) J Vaněk | 6 | 7^{7}
(Argentina) M Zabaleta | 2 | 6^{0}
WC | (Croatia) G Ivanišević | 6 | 6
(Czech Republic) J Novák | 3 | 4
(Argentina) A Calleri | 2 | 6^{5}
LL | (Croatia) I Ljubičić | 6 | 7^{7}
(Germany) R Schüttler | 6 | 7^{7}
Q | (Netherlands) E Kempes | 4 | 6^{4}

Second round
11 | (France) A Clément | 6 | 6
(Czech Republic) J Vaněk | 4 | 4
WC | (Croatia) G Ivanišević | 4 | 3
22 | (Spain) C Moyá | 6 | 6
27 | (Belarus) V Voltchkov | 6^{5} | 6^{4}
LL | (Croatia) I Ljubičić | 7^{7} | 7^{7}
(Germany) R Schüttler | 4 | 3
6 | (Sweden) M Norman | 6 | 6

Third round
11 | (France) A Clément | 4 | 6 | 4
22 | (Spain) C Moyá | 6 | 0 | 6
LL | (Croatia) I Ljubičić | 7^{7} | 6
6 | (Sweden) M Norman | 6^{5} | 2

Fourth round
22 | (Spain) C Moyá | 3 | 6 | 4
LL | (Croatia) I Ljubičić | 6 | 4 | 6

=== Bottom half ===
==== Section 5 ====
First round
(Austria) S Koubek | 6 | 3 | 4
Q | (Spain) J Díaz | 3 | 6 | 6
(Australia) J Stoltenberg | 6 | 2 | 0
Q | (United States) C Mamiit | 4 | 6 | 6
(United States) P Goldstein | 5 | 5
(Argentina) G Coria | 7 | 7
(Italy) D Sanguinetti | 6 | 6^{6} | 3
(France) F Santoro | 4 | 7^{8} | 6

Second round
7 | (Australia) L Hewitt | 6 | 6
Q | (Spain) J Díaz | 3 | 3
Q | (United States) C Mamiit | 1 | 3
28 | (Ecuador) N Lapentti | 6 | 6
18 | (Argentina) F Squillari | 4 | 2
(Argentina) G Coria | 6 | 6
(France) F Santoro | 4 | 7^{7} | 6
9 | (United Kingdom) T Henman | 6 | 6^{4} | 3

Third round
7 | (Australia) L Hewitt | 6 | 6
28 | (Ecuador) N Lapentti | 3 | 3
(Argentina) G Coria | 2 | 5
(France) F Santoro | 6 | 7

Fourth round
7 | (Australia) L Hewitt | 3 | 6 | 6
(France) F Santoro | 6 | 1 | 2

==== Section 6 ====
First round
(United States) T Martin | 6 | 3 | 4
(Belarus) M Mirnyi | 2 | 6 | 6
Q | (United States) J Gimelstob | 6 | 2 | 0
(Sweden) A Vinciguerra | 3 | 6 | 6
WC | (United States) A Roddick | 6 | 6
(Israel) H Levy | 3 | 2
(Germany) N Kiefer | 5 | 6 | 6
(Switzerland) M Kratochvil | 7 | 0 | 4

Second round
15 | (France) S Grosjean | 4 | 7 | 6
(Belarus) M Mirnyi | 6 | 5 | 2
(Sweden) A Vinciguerra | 3 | 1
21 | (Romania) A Pavel | 6 | 6
26 | (Chile) M Ríos | 4 | 1
WC | (United States) A Roddick | 6 | 6
(Germany) N Kiefer | 3 | 6 | 3
4 | (United States) P Sampras | 6 | 3 | 6

Third round
15 | (France) S Grosjean | 6^{2} | 6 | 0
21 | (Romania) A Pavel | 7^{7} | 2 | 6
WC | (United States) A Roddick | 7^{7} | 6
4 | (United States) P Sampras | 6^{2} | 3

Fourth round
21 | (Romania) A Pavel | 6^{10} | 2
WC | (United States) A Roddick | 7^{12} | 6

==== Section 7 ====
First round
(Spain) A Costa | 6 | 6
(Czech Republic) M Tabara | 3 | 2
(France) J Boutter | 5 | 2
Q | (Netherlands) J Siemerink | 7 | 6
(Czech Republic) B Ulihrach | 6 | 6
(Spain) F Vicente | 4 | 2
Q | (Russia) A Stoliarov | 3 | 6 | 6
(Argentina) M Puerta | 6 | 4 | 4

Second round
5 | (Russia) Y Kafelnikov | 7^{8} | 6
(Spain) A Costa | 6^{6} | 3
Q | (Netherlands) J Siemerink | 6^{5} | 2
31 | (Argentina) G Gaudio | 7^{7} | 6
17 | (South Africa) W Ferreira | 7 | 4 | 3
(Czech Republic) B Ulihrach | 5 | 6 | 6
Q | (Russia) A Stoliarov | 4 | 1
12 | (Spain) J C Ferrero | 6 | 6

Third round
5 | (Russia) Y Kafelnikov | 4 | 1
31 | (Argentina) G Gaudio | 6 | 6
(Czech Republic) B Ulihrach | 6^{4} | 3
12 | (Spain) J C Ferrero | 7^{7} | 6

Fourth round
31 | (Argentina) G Gaudio | 6 | 3 | 6
12 | (Spain) J C Ferrero | 0 | 6 | 3

==== Section 8 ====
First round
(Spain) S Bruguera | 3 | 6 | 3
(Spain) Á Calatrava | 6 | 1 | 6
WC | (Brazil) A Simoni | 3 | 4
(Australia) A Ilie | 6 | 6
(South Korea) H-T Lee | 1 | 4
(Sweden) J Björkman | 6 | 6
(Zimbabwe) B Black | 6^{3} | 3
(Spain) J Balcells | 7^{7} | 6

Second round
14 | (Sweden) T Enqvist | 6 | 6
(Spain) Á Calatrava | 3 | 2
(Australia) A Ilie | 7^{9} | 6^{6} | 3
19 | (United States) J-M Gambill | 6^{7} | 7^{8} | 6
32 | (France) N Escudé | 5 | 4
(Sweden) J Björkman | 7 | 6
(Spain) J Balcells | 4 | 6 | 6
2 | (Russia) M Safin | 6 | 4 | 3

Third round
14 | (Sweden) T Enqvist | 5 | 7^{9} | 1
19 | (United States) J-M Gambill | 7 | 6^{7} | 6
(Sweden) J Björkman | 6 | 6
(Spain) J Balcells | 2 | 1

Fourth round
19 | (United States) J-M Gambill | 6 | 6
(Sweden) J Björkman | 1 | 2

== Qualifying ==
=== Qualifying seeds ===
1. (Belgium) Xavier Malisse (first round)
2. (Netherlands) Jan Siemerink (qualified)
3. (Croatia) Ivan Ljubičić (qualifying competition, lucky loser)
4. (Brazil) Fernando Meligeni (qualified)
5. (France) Antony Dupuis (qualifying competition)
6. (Russia) Andrei Stoliarov (qualified)
7. (Armenia) Sargis Sargsian (qualifying competition)
8. (Canada) Sébastien Lareau (qualifying competition)
9. (Netherlands) Raemon Sluiter (first round)
10. (Germany) Lars Burgsmüller (first round)
11. (Switzerland) George Bastl (qualified)
12. (Netherlands) Edwin Kempes (qualified)
13. (Netherlands) Peter Wessels (first round)
14. (United States) Justin Gimelstob (qualified)
15. (United States) Jeff Tarango (qualifying competition)
16. (Norway) Christian Ruud (first round, retired due to an illness)
17. (Spain) Jacobo Díaz (qualified)
18. (Thailand) Paradorn Srichaphan (qualifying competition)
19. (Australia) Richard Fromberg (qualified)
20. (Philippines) Cecil Mamiit (qualified)
21. (France) Cyril Saulnier (first round)
22. (Denmark) Kristian Pless (first round)
23. (Peru) Luis Horna (qualifying competition)
24. (United States) Kevin Kim (qualifying competition)

=== Qualifiers ===
1. (United States) Bob Bryan
2. (Netherlands) Jan Siemerink
3. (Spain) Jacobo Díaz
4. (Brazil) Fernando Meligeni
5. (United States) Justin Gimelstob
6. (Russia) Andrei Stoliarov
7. (United States) Robby Ginepri
8. (Australia) Richard Fromberg
9. (Philippines) Cecil Mamiit
10. (Argentina) David Nalbandian
11. (Switzerland) George Bastl
12. (Netherlands) Edwin Kempes

=== Lucky loser ===
1. (Croatia) Ivan Ljubičić

=== Qualifying draw ===
==== First qualifier ====
First round
1 | (Belgium) Xavier Malisse | 4 | 3
(United States) Bob Bryan | 6 | 6
(Czech Republic) Jan Vacek | 6 | 6^{3} | 3
23 | (Peru) Luis Horna | 4 | 7^{7} | 6

Qualifying competition
(United States) Bob Bryan | 7^{8} | 6
23 | (Peru) Luis Horna | 6^{6} | 4

==== Second qualifier ====
First round
2 | (Netherlands) Jan Siemerink | 3 | 7^{7} | 6
(France) Stéphane Huet | 6 | 6^{5} | 2
(France) Nicolas Thomann | 4 | 7 | 6^{10}
18 | (Thailand) Paradorn Srichaphan | 6 | 5 | 7^{12}

Qualifying competition
2 | (Netherlands) Jan Siemerink | 3 | 6 | 7^{7}
18 | (Thailand) Paradorn Srichaphan | 6 | 1 | 6^{5}

==== Third qualifier ====
First round
3 | (Croatia) Ivan Ljubičić | 7^{7} | 6
(United States) Michael Russell | 6^{5} | 3
(Ecuador) Giovanni Lapentti | 3 | 0
17 | (Spain) Jacobo Díaz | 6 | 6

Qualifying competition
3 | (Croatia) Ivan Ljubičić | 6^{5} | 3
17 | (Spain) Jacobo Díaz | 7^{7} | 6

==== Fourth qualifier ====
First round
4 | (Brazil) Fernando Meligeni | 6 | 1 | 6
(Germany) Oliver Gross | 3 | 6 | 2
(Switzerland) Ivo Heuberger | 6 | 3 | 6
13 | (Netherlands) Peter Wessels | 3 | 6 | 3

Qualifying competition
4 | (Brazil) Fernando Meligeni | 6 | 6
(Switzerland) Ivo Heuberger | 4 | 4

==== Fifth qualifier ====
First round
5 | (France) Antony Dupuis | 7^{7} | 6
(Brazil) André Sá | 6^{0} | 4
(South Africa) Neville Godwin | 5 | 1
14 | (United States) Justin Gimelstob | 7 | 6

Qualifying competition
5 | (France) Antony Dupuis | 7 | 4 | 2
14 | (United States) Justin Gimelstob | 5 | 6 | 6

==== Sixth qualifier ====
First round
6 | (Russia) Andrei Stoliarov | 6 | 7^{7}
(Germany) Marc-Kevin Goellner | 4 | 6^{3}
(Argentina) Martín Rodríguez | 5 | 7 | 6
22 | (Denmark) Kristian Pless | 7 | 5 | 4

Qualifying competition
6 | (Russia) Andrei Stoliarov | 6 | 6
(Argentina) Martín Rodríguez | 2 | 1

==== Seventh qualifier ====
First round
7 | (Armenia) Sargis Sargsian | 2 | 6 | 6
(France) Nicolas Coutelot | 6 | 4 | 2
(United States) Robby Ginepri | 7 | 6
21 | (France) Cyril Saulnier | 5 | 2

Qualifying competition
7 | (Armenia) Sargis Sargsian | 4 | 6 | 3
(United States) Robby Ginepri | 6 | 1 | 6

==== Eighth qualifier ====
First round
8 | (Canada) Sébastien Lareau | 7^{7} | 3 | 6
(Canada) Daniel Nestor | 6^{2} | 6 | 3
(Haiti) Ronald Agénor | 6 | 5 | 3
19 | (Australia) Richard Fromberg | 3 | 7 | 6

Qualifying competition
8 | (Canada) Sébastien Lareau | 4 | 6 | 4
19 | (Australia) Richard Fromberg | 6 | 4 | 6

==== Ninth qualifier ====
First round
9 | (Netherlands) Raemon Sluiter | 7 | 3 | 4
(United States) James Blake | 5 | 6 | 6
(Italy) Laurence Tieleman | 2 | 3
20 | (Philippines) Cecil Mamiit | 6 | 6

Qualifying competition
(United States) James Blake | 3 | 0
20 | (Philippines) Cecil Mamiit | 6 | 6

==== Tenth qualifier ====
First round
10 | (Germany) Lars Burgsmüller | 3 | 3
(Argentina) David Nalbandian | 6 | 6
(United States) Vince Spadea | 4 | 3
15 | (United States) Jeff Tarango | 6 | 6

Qualifying competition
(Argentina) David Nalbandian | 6 | 6
15 | (United States) Jeff Tarango | 3 | 0

==== Eleventh qualifier ====
First round
11 | (Switzerland) George Bastl | 6 | 6
(France) Lionel Roux | 3 | 0
(Zimbabwe) Wayne Black | 3 | 6
16 | (Norway) Christian Ruud | 6 | 4 | r

Qualifying competition
11 | (Switzerland) George Bastl | 6 | 6
(Zimbabwe) Wayne Black | 1 | 2

==== Twelfth qualifier ====
First round
12 | (Netherlands) Edwin Kempes | 7 | 6
(Spain) Juan Albert Viloca | 5 | 3
(United States) Jeff Salzenstein | 4 | 6^{4}
24 | (United States) Kevin Kim | 6 | 7^{7}

Qualifying competition
12 | (Netherlands) Edwin Kempes | 6^{3} | 6 | 7^{7}
24 | (United States) Kevin Kim | 7^{7} | 2 | 6^{2}
