= 2002 US Open – Men's singles =

Men's singles
- 2002 US Open

Final
- Champion: (United States) Pete Sampras
- Runner-up: (United States) Andre Agassi
- Score: 6–3, 6–4, 5–7, 6–4

Details
- Draw: 128
- Seeds: 32

Events
Singles	men	women		boys	girls
Doubles	men	women	mixed	boys	girls
WC Singles	men	women	quad
WC Doubles	men	women	quad
Legends	men	women	mixed
← 2001 ·	US Open	· 2003 →

Pete Sampras defeated Andre Agassi in the final, 6–3, 6–4, 5–7, 6–4 to win the men's singles tennis title at the 2002 US Open. It was his fifth US Open title (an Open Era record) and his all-time record-extending 14th and last major title overall. The final was a rematch of the 1990 and 1995 US Open finals, where Sampras won his first and seventh major titles respectively. It was the 34th and final meeting between the pair (with Sampras' victory ending the head-to-head at 20–14 in his favor) and Sampras' last professional appearance, though he did not officially declare his retirement until 2003. Sampras became the only man in the Open Era to win the final Grand Slam that he played.

Lleyton Hewitt was the defending champion, but lost to Agassi in the semifinals.

This marked the most recent occasion where eight different men appeared in the four major singles finals of a calendar year.

== Seeds ==
1. (Australia) Lleyton Hewitt (semifinals)
2. (Russia) Marat Safin (second round)
3. (Germany) Tommy Haas (fourth round)
4. (Russia) Yevgeny Kafelnikov (second round)
5. (United Kingdom) Tim Henman (third round)
6. (United States) Andre Agassi (final)
7. (Spain) Juan Carlos Ferrero (third round)
8. (Spain) Albert Costa (second round)
9. (Spain) Carlos Moyá (second round)
10. (France) Sébastien Grosjean (second round)
11. (United States) Andy Roddick (quarterfinals)
12. (Sweden) Thomas Johansson (withdrew)
13. (Switzerland) Roger Federer (fourth round)
14. (Czech Republic) Jiří Novák (fourth round)
15. (Argentina) Guillermo Cañas (withdrew)
16. (Argentina) David Nalbandian (first round)
17. (United States) Pete Sampras (champion)
18. (Spain) Àlex Corretja (third round)
19. (Belgium) Xavier Malisse (third round)
20. (Morocco) Younes El Aynaoui (quarterfinals)
21. (Argentina) Gastón Gaudio (third round)
22. (Chile) Marcelo Ríos (third round)
23. (Germany) Rainer Schüttler (first round)
24. (Netherlands) Sjeng Schalken (semifinals)
25. (United States) James Blake (third round)
26. (Argentina) Juan Ignacio Chela (fourth round)
27. (Ecuador) Nicolás Lapentti (first round)
28. (Chile) Fernando González (quarterfinals)
29. (Sweden) Thomas Enqvist (third round)
30. (Romania) Andrei Pavel (first round)
31. (Spain) Tommy Robredo (third round)
32. (Belarus) Max Mirnyi (quarterfinals)
33. (United Kingdom) Greg Rusedski (third round)
34. (Finland) Jarkko Nieminen (first round)

== Draw ==
Key

- Q = Qualifier
- WC = Wild card
- LL = Lucky loser
- Alt = Alternate
- ITF = ITF entry
- PR = Protected ranking
- SR = Special ranking
- SE = Special exempt
- JE = Junior exempt
- JR = Junior Accelerator Programme entrant
- CO = College Accelerator Programme entrant
- NG = Next Gen Accelerator Program entrant
- w/o = Walkover
- r = Retired
- d = Defaulted

=== Finals ===
Quarterfinals
1	(Australia) Lleyton Hewitt	6	7^{8}	4	6
20	(Morocco) Younes El Aynaoui	1	6^{6}	6	2
32	(Belarus) Max Mirnyi	7^{7}	3	5	3
6	(United States) Andre Agassi	6^{5}	6	7	6
11	(United States) Andy Roddick	3	2	4
17	(United States) Pete Sampras	6	6	6
28	(Chile) Fernando González	7^{7}	3	3	7^{7}	6^{2}
24	(Netherlands) Sjeng Schalken	6^{5}	6	6	6^{5}	7^{7}

Semifinals
1	(Australia) Lleyton Hewitt	4	6^{5}	7^{7}	2
6	(United States) Andre Agassi	6	7^{7}	6^{1}	6
17	(United States) Pete Sampras	7^{8}	7^{7}	6
24	(Netherlands) Sjeng Schalken	6^{6}	6^{4}	2

Final
6	(United States) Andre Agassi	3	4	7	4
17	(United States) Pete Sampras	6	6	5	6

=== Top half ===
==== Section 1 ====
First round
1	(Australia) L Hewitt	6	6	6
(France) N Coutelot	2	3	3
Q	(Russia) I Kunitsyn	7^{7}	4	4	3
Q	(Israel) N Okun	6^{4}	6	6	6
(Russia) N Davydenko	6	1	6	6
Q	(Bulgaria) R Lukaev	4	6	4	4
WC	(United States) B Vahaly	7^{7}	3	3	6^{5}
25	(United States) J Blake	6^{3}	6	6	7^{7}
22	(Chile) M Ríos	1	6	6	6
(Sweden) J Björkman	6	2	4	1
LL	(Germany) L Burgsmüller	6^{7}	0	4
Q	(Sweden) R Söderling	7^{9}	6	6
(Peru) L Horna	4	6^{3}	6	4
Q	(Netherlands) J van Lottum	6	7^{7}	4	6
PR	(Netherlands) R Krajicek	1	4^{r}
14	(Czech Republic) J Novák	6	5

Second round
1	(Australia) L Hewitt	7^{9}	6	6
Q	(Israel) N Okun	6^{7}	4	1
(Russia) N Davydenko	3	6	1	3
25	(United States) J Blake	6	4	6	6
22	(Chile) M Ríos	6	3	6	6
Q	(Sweden) R Söderling	4	6	3	3
Q	(Netherlands) J van Lottum	4	6^{3}	1
14	(Czech Republic) J Novák	6	7^{7}	6

Third round
1	(Australia) L Hewitt	6^{5}	6	6	3	6
25	(United States) J Blake	7^{7}	3	4	6	3
22	(Chile) M Ríos	3	3	0^{r}
14	(Czech Republic) J Novák	6	6	0

Fourth round
1	(Australia) L Hewitt	6	6	7
14	(Czech Republic) J Novák	4	2	5

==== Section 2 ====
First round
34	(Finland) J Nieminen	6	3	0	2
(Spain) F Vicente	1	6	6	6
(South Korea) H-t Lee	6^{6}	6	3	3
WC	(United States) M Fish	7^{8}	4	6	6
(Belgium) O Rochus	2	2	4
(Morocco) H Arazi	6	6	6
(United States) J Morrison	7^{8}	3	2	5
20	(Morocco) Y El Aynaoui	6^{6}	6	6	7
31	(Spain) T Robredo	6	6^{3}	7	4	7^{7}
(Argentina) M Zabaleta	2	7^{7}	5	6	6^{5}
(Argentina) A Calleri	6	6^{5}	4	3
(Brazil) F Meligeni	3	7^{7}	6	6
(Czech Republic) J Vacek	3	4	5
(South Africa) W Ferreira	6	6	7
PR	(Sweden) M Norman	2	4	6	3
8	(Spain) A Costa	6	6	3	6

Second round
(Spain) F Vicente	7	7^{7}	6
WC	(United States) M Fish	5	6^{4}	1
(Morocco) H Arazi	3	4	0	r
20	(Morocco) Y El Aynaoui	6	6	2
31	(Spain) T Robredo	4	6	6	4	6
(Brazil) F Meligeni	6	3	3	6	2
(South Africa) W Ferreira	1	6^{10}	6	7	6
8	(Spain) A Costa	6	7^{12}	4	5	4

Third round
(Spain) F Vicente	2	6	1	2
20	(Morocco) Y El Aynaoui	6	2	6	6
31	(Spain) T Robredo	1	2	5
(South Africa) W Ferreira	6	6	7

Fourth round
20	(Morocco) Y El Aynaoui	3	7	7	7^{7}
(South Africa) W Ferreira	6	5	5	6^{3}

==== Section 3 ====
First round
4	(Russia) Y Kafelnikov	6	7	3	6
(Italy) D Sanguinetti	2	5	6	4
LL	(Croatia) M Ančić	6	3	6^{3}	7	2r
(Slovakia) D Hrbatý	4	6	7^{7}	5	3
(Italy) A Gaudenzi	3	3	2^{r}
(France) A Dupuis	6	6	4
(Hungary) A Sávolt	6^{4}	5	1^{r}
32	(Belarus) M Mirnyi	7^{7}	7	0
19	(Belgium) X Malisse	7	6	6
(Spain) A Montañés	5	2	2
(France) J Golmard	6	6	1	3	2
(United States) V Spadea	4	2	6	6	6
(United States) M Chang	7^{8}	3	6	7^{7}
(Spain) F Clavet	6^{6}	6	4	6^{3}
(Czech Republic) J Vaněk	1	3	6	5
13	(Switzerland) R Federer	6	6	4	7

Second round
4	(Russia) Y Kafelnikov	3	1	1
(Slovakia) D Hrbatý	6	6	6
(France) A Dupuis	4	3	6	2
32	(Belarus) M Mirnyi	6	6	3	6
19	(Belgium) X Malisse	6	4	6	6
(United States) V Spadea	4	6	2	2
(United States) M Chang	3	1	3
13	(Switzerland) R Federer	6	6	6

Third round
(Slovakia) D Hrbatý	6^{5}	6	4	4
32	(Belarus) M Mirnyi	7^{7}	2	6	6
19	(Belgium) X Malisse	6	3	4	4
13	(Switzerland) R Federer	4	6	6	6

Fourth round
32	(Belarus) M Mirnyi	6	7^{7}	6
13	(Switzerland) R Federer	3	6^{5}	4

==== Section 4 ====
First round
9	(Spain) C Moyá	3	6	6	7^{7}
(Romania) A Voinea	6	4	3	6^{4}
(United States) J-M Gambill	6	2
(Austria) J Knowle	1	1^{r}
(Brazil) A Sá	5	6^{1}	3
(Spain) F López	7	7^{7}	6
(United States) T Martin	2	3	6	5
21	(Argentina) G Gaudio	6	6	0	7
30	(Romania) A Pavel	6	6^{7}	6	3	4
PR	(Israel) H Levy	1	7^{9}	4	6	6
WC	(United States) A Bogomolov Jr.	3	7^{8}	6	4	5
(Paraguay) R Delgado	6	6^{6}	0	6	7
WC	(United States) J Gimelstob	6	3	6	6^{4}	6
Q	(Netherlands) E Kempes	4	6	3	7^{7}	3
(United States) R Ginepri	3	3	3
6	(United States) A Agassi	6	6	6

Second round
9	(Spain) C Moyá	3	3	1
(United States) J-M Gambill	6	6	6
(Spain) F López	2	6	4	3
21	(Argentina) G Gaudio	6	3	6	6
PR	(Israel) H Levy	6	3	6^{4}	6^{3}
(Paraguay) R Delgado	4	6	7^{7}	7^{7}
WC	(United States) J Gimelstob	0	1	1
6	(United States) A Agassi	6	6	6

Third round
(United States) J-M Gambill	6	6	6
21	(Argentina) G Gaudio	0	2	0
(Paraguay) R Delgado	2	1	2
6	(United States) A Agassi	6	6	6

Fourth round
(United States) J-M Gambill	2	3	3
6	(United States) A Agassi	6	6	6

=== Bottom half ===
==== Section 5 ====
First round
5	(United Kingdom) T Henman	6	6	6
Q	(Finland) T Ketola	1	1	1
Q	(Belgium) D Norman	4	4	6	7^{7}	6
(Czech Republic) B Ulihrach	6	6	4	6^{5}	4
(France) M Llodra	6	6	6
(Argentina) J Acasuso	1	2	2
(Spain) F Mantilla	2	6^{4}	2
26	(Argentina) JI Chela	6	7^{7}	6
18	(Spain) A Corretja	6	6	6
(Georgia (country)) I Labadze	3	4	2
Q	(Switzerland) I Heuberger	6	2	7	3	7^{7}
Q	(Algeria) S Saoudi	4	6	5	6	6^{3}
(United States) T Dent	6	3	0	6	3
(Netherlands) R Sluiter	3	6	6	1	6
Q	(Netherlands) M Verkerk	6^{2}	3	4
11	(United States) A Roddick	7^{7}	6	6

Second round
5	(United Kingdom) T Henman	6	6	7
Q	(Belgium) D Norman	3	4	5
(France) M Llodra	6^{7}	3	2
26	(Argentina) JI Chela	7^{9}	6	6
18	(Spain) A Corretja	7	6	6
Q	(Switzerland) I Heuberger	5	2	1
(Netherlands) R Sluiter	2	4	4
11	(United States) A Roddick	6	6	6

Third round
5	(United Kingdom) T Henman	3	3	2
26	(Argentina) JI Chela	6	6	6
18	(Spain) A Corretja	4	1	6^{6}
11	(United States) A Roddick	6	6	7^{8}

Fourth round
26	(Argentina) JI Chela	7	4	4	4
11	(United States) A Roddick	5	6	6	6

==== Section 6 ====
First round
33	(United Kingdom) G Rusedski	6	4	7^{7}	6
WC	(United States) A Kim	1	6	6^{1}	3
(Thailand) P Srichaphan	6	6	6
WC	(India) P Amritraj	1	3	0
Q	(United States) E Taino	7^{7}	3	2	1
(Denmark) K Pless	6^{5}	6	6	6
(Spain) A Portas	1	4	4
17	(United States) P Sampras	6	6	6
29	(Sweden) T Enqvist	6	6	7^{7}
WC	(United States) M Boeker	2	3	6^{3}
(Spain) A Martín	5	6	6	7^{8}
(Switzerland) M Kratochvil	7	4	3	6^{6}
(Slovakia) K Kučera	6^{0}	6	2	6	6
(Czech Republic) R Štěpánek	7^{7}	4	6	2	1
(Spain) D Sánchez	6^{1}	6	6	4	5
3	(Germany) T Haas	7^{7}	3	3	6	7

Second round
33	(United Kingdom) G Rusedski	3	7^{7}	7^{7}	6^{3}	6
(Thailand) P Srichaphan	6	6^{2}	6^{5}	7^{7}	4
(Denmark) K Pless	3	5	4
17	(United States) P Sampras	6	7	6
29	(Sweden) T Enqvist	6	7^{7}	6
(Spain) A Martín	1	6^{3}	0
(Slovakia) K Kučera	1	4	4
3	(Germany) T Haas	6	6	6

Third round
33	(United Kingdom) G Rusedski	6^{4}	6	6^{3}	6	4
17	(United States) P Sampras	7^{7}	4	7^{7}	3	6
29	(Sweden) T Enqvist	4	6	6	4	4
3	(Germany) T Haas	6	3	3	6	6

Fourth round
17	(United States) P Sampras	7	6	6^{5}	7
3	(Germany) T Haas	5	4	7^{7}	5

==== Section 7 ====
First round
7	(Spain) JC Ferrero	7^{7}	7^{7}	3	7
(Australia) W Arthurs	6^{4}	6^{2}	6	5
Q	(Argentina) G Etlis	6	6	7^{7}
Q	(Sweden) B Rehnquist	3	4	6^{3}
(Denmark) K Carlsen	7^{7}	4	6	5	7^{7}
(Brazil) F Saretta	6^{2}	6	4	7	6^{4}
(France) P-H Mathieu	6	6^{1}	6	4	4
28	(Chile) F González	2	7^{7}	3	6	6
23	(Germany) R Schüttler	6	7^{7}	4	0^{r}
Q	(France) J-R Lisnard	3	6^{2}	6	4
Q	(Germany) A Waske	6^{4}	5	2
(Argentina) G Coria	7^{7}	7	6
(Austria) S Koubek	3	6	5	3
(France) A Clément	6	4	7	6
(Switzerland) M Rosset	1	6	1	4
10	(France) S Grosjean	6	3	6	6

Second round
7	(Spain) JC Ferrero	6	5	6	7
Q	(Argentina) G Etlis	2	7	0	5
(Denmark) K Carlsen	6^{5}	4	6^{3}
28	(Chile) F González	7^{7}	6	7^{7}
Q	(France) J-R Lisnard	1	3	4
(Argentina) G Coria	6	6	6
(France) A Clément	6	3	4	6	6
10	(France) S Grosjean	3	6	6	2	4

Third round
7	(Spain) JC Ferrero	4	4	4
28	(Chile) F González	6	6	6
(Argentina) G Coria	6	2	5	6^{5}
(France) A Clément	2	6	7	7^{7}

Fourth round
28	(Chile) F González	6	6	6
(France) A Clément	4	2	3

==== Section 8 ====
First round
16	(Argentina) D Nalbandian	1	4	4
(Armenia) S Sargsian	6	6	6
(Germany) A Popp	7^{7}	7^{12}	6
(Sweden) A Vinciguerra	6^{4}	6^{10}	2
(France) F Santoro	6^{3}	4	7^{7}	5
(Croatia) I Ljubičić	7^{7}	6	6^{2}	7
(Australia) M Philippoussis	7^{7}	6	3	3	0^{r}
24	(Netherlands) S Schalken	6^{1}	4	6	6	0
27	(Ecuador) N Lapentti	4	3	7^{10}	5
(Chile) N Massú	6	6	6^{8}	7
(Austria) J Melzer	6	7	6
WC	(United States) J Brasington	3	5	3
(France) J Boutter	6	6^{5}	1	0
(Brazil) G Kuerten	3	7^{7}	6	6
(Germany) N Kiefer	3	6	6	4	6^{4}
2	(Russia) M Safin	6	4	4	6	7^{7}

Second round
(Armenia) S Sargsian	2	6	6	6^{5}	6
(Germany) A Popp	6	3	4	7^{7}	4
(Croatia) I Ljubičić	3	3	4
24	(Netherlands) S Schalken	6	6	6
(Chile) N Massú	6	7^{7}	4	6
(Austria) J Melzer	4	6^{3}	6	0
(Brazil) G Kuerten	6	6	7
2	(Russia) M Safin	4	4	5

Third round
(Armenia) S Sargsian	5	3	6	1
24	(Netherlands) S Schalken	7	6	3	6
(Chile) N Massú	1	4^{r}
(Brazil) G Kuerten	6	5

Fourth round
24	(Netherlands) S Schalken	6	7^{8}	6^{5}	7^{7}
(Brazil) G Kuerten	3	6^{6}	7^{7}	6^{4}

== Other entry information ==
=== Wild cards ===
- (India) Prakash Amritraj
- (United States) Alex Bogomolov Jr.
- (United States) Jack Brasington
- (United States) Matías Boeker
- (United States) Mardy Fish
- (United States) Justin Gimelstob
- (United States) Alex Kim
- (United States) Brian Vahaly

=== Protected ranking ===
- (Netherlands) Richard Krajicek
- (Israel) Harel Levy
- (Sweden) Magnus Norman

=== Qualifiers ===
- (Argentina) Gastón Etlis
- (Switzerland) Ivo Heuberger
- (Netherlands) Edwin Kempes
- (Finland) Tuomas Ketola
- (Russia) Igor Kunitsyn
- (France) Jean-René Lisnard
- (Bulgaria) Radoslav Lukaev
- (Belgium) Dick Norman
- (Israel) Noam Okun
- (Sweden) Björn Rehnquist
- (Algeria) Slimane Saoudi
- (Sweden) Robin Söderling
- (United States) Eric Taino
- (Netherlands) John van Lottum
- (Netherlands) Martin Verkerk
- (Germany) Alexander Waske

=== Lucky losers ===
- (Croatia) Mario Ančić
- (Germany) Lars Burgsmüller

=== Withdrawals ===
- (Croatia) Goran Ivanišević (68) → replaced by (Austria) Jürgen Melzer (103)
- (Austria) Markus Hipfl (95) → replaced by (Denmark) Kenneth Carlsen (104)
- (France) Nicolas Escudé (40) → replaced by (Italy) Andrea Gaudenzi (105) (Note: Last direct acceptance)
- (Argentina) Guillermo Cañas (23) → replaced by (Germany) Lars Burgsmüller (LL)
- (Sweden) Thomas Johansson (9) → replaced by (Croatia) Mario Ančić (LL)

== Notes ==
Preceded by 2002 Wimbledon Championships – Men's singles	Grand Slam men's singles	Succeeded by 2003 Australian Open – Men's singles
