= Peter Wessels =

Dutch tennis player

- Country (sports): Netherlands
- Residence: Amsterdam, Netherlands
- Born: 7 May 1978 (age 47); Zwolle, Netherlands
- Height: 1.95 m (6 ft 5 in)
- Turned pro: 1996
- Retired: 2009
- Plays: Right-handed (one-handed backhand)
- Prize money: $928,863

Singles
- Career record: 45–60
- Career titles: 1
- Highest ranking: No. 72 (7 February 2005)

Grand Slam singles results
- Australian Open: 2R (2005)
- French Open: 2R (2005)
- Wimbledon: 1R (1999, 2001, 2005)
- US Open: 3R (1999)

Doubles
- Career record: 12–21
- Career titles: 0
- Highest ranking: No. 111 (26 October 1998)

Grand Slam doubles results
- Australian Open: 1R (1999)
- Last updated on: 10 June 2022.

Peter Wessels (Dutch pronunciation: [ˈpeːtər ˈʋɛsəls]; born 7 May 1978) is a former tour professional male tennis player and a coach from the Netherlands. He achieved his career-high singles ranking of world No. 72 in February 2005.

== Biography ==
Wessels had an excellent junior career, finishing No. 5 in singles and No. 18 in doubles in the 1995 world junior rankings. In that year he reached the singles semifinals at Wimbledon and US Open juniors and captured Roland Garros junior doubles title with fellow countryman Raemon Sluiter.

His best result on the professional tour was winning the 2000 ATP tournament in Newport beating German Jens Knippschild in the final 7–6, 6–3.

He started 2006 by qualifying for the Hopman Cup tournament in Perth with Michaëlla Krajicek where the Dutch went all the way to the final only to be beaten in a very close mixed doubles by the American team of Taylor Dent and Lisa Raymond. Despite this, Wessels and Krajicek proved that they were a force to be reckoned with. At the Hopman Cup, he won 4 out of his 5 singles matches (def. Peng Sun, Gastón Gaudio, Todd Reid and Nicolas Kiefer; lost to Taylor Dent). In mixed doubles, they had a 3–2 record (def. Reid/Stosur, Peng/Sun, Grönefeld/Kiefer; lost to Raymond/Dent, Dulko/Gaudio).

In June 2007 Wessels qualified for the Ordina Open grass tournament in 's-Hertogenbosch. Ranked 488 he caused an upset in the quarterfinals by beating the number one seeded Spaniard Tommy Robredo, in two sets: 6–3, 6–3. He subsequently reached the final but narrowly lost against Croat Ivan Ljubičić 6–7^{(5)}, 6–3, 6–7^{(4)}.

Since 2024, he is coaching Sorana Cirstea.

== ATP career finals ==
=== Singles: 2 (1 title, 1 runner-up) ===
Legend Grand Slam Tournaments (0–0) ATP World Tour Finals (0–0) ATP Masters Series (0–0) ATP Championship Series (0–0) ATP World Series (1–1)	Finals by surface Hard (0–0) Clay (0–0) Grass (1–1) Carpet (0–0)	Finals by setting Outdoors (1–1) Indoors (0–0)

Result	W–L	Date	Tournament	Tier	Surface	Opponent	Score
Win	1–0	Jul 2000	Newport, United States	International Series	Grass	(Germany) Jens Knippschild	7–6^{(7–3)}, 6–3
Loss	1–1	Jun 2007	's-Hertogenbosch, Netherlands	International Series	Grass	(Croatia) Ivan Ljubičić	6–7^{(5–7)}, 6–4, 6–7^{(4–7)}

== ATP Challenger and ITF Futures finals ==
=== Singles: 17 (8-9) ===
Legend ATP Challenger (6–9) ITF Futures (2–0)	Finals by surface Hard (5–4) Clay (1–3) Grass (0–0) Carpet (2–2)

Result	W–L	Date	Tournament	Tier	Surface	Opponent	Score
Win	1–0	Feb 1998	Lübeck, Germany	Challenger	Carpet	(Germany) Michael Kohlmann	7–6, 6–3
Loss	1–1	Oct 1998	Santiago, Chile	Challenger	Clay	(Argentina) Sebastián Prieto	5–7, 4–6
Loss	1–2	Nov 1998	Portorož, Slovenia	Challenger	Hard	(Germany) Rainer Schüttler	3–6, 2–6
Loss	1–3	Dec 1998	Nümbrecht, Germany	Challenger	Carpet	(Germany) Christian Vinck	7–6, 4–6, 4–6
Loss	1–4	May 2001	Antwerp, Belgium	Challenger	Clay	(Belgium) Dick Norman	3–5 ret.
Loss	1–5	Nov 2001	Eckental, Germany	Challenger	Carpet	(Germany) Alexander Popp	4–6, 7–5, 2–6
Win	2–5	Mar 2003	France F8, Melun	Futures	Carpet	(France) Thierry Ascione	walkover
Win	3–5	Oct 2003	Réunion Island, Réunion	Challenger	Hard	(Netherlands) Fred Hemmes	6–0, 6–2
Loss	3–6	Mar 2004	Sanremo, Italy	Challenger	Clay	(Italy) Potito Starace	4–6, 4–6
Win	4–6	Jul 2004	Scheveningen, Netherlands	Challenger	Clay	(Netherlands) Raemon Sluiter	7–5, 7–6^{(9–7)}
Loss	4–7	Aug 2004	Bronx, United States	Challenger	Hard	(France) Julien Jeanpierre	6–7^{(4–7)}, 6–3, 3–6
Win	5–7	Sep 2004	Istanbul, Turkey	Challenger	Hard	(Italy) Daniele Bracciali	6–3, 6–2
Loss	5–8	Oct 2004	Bolton, United Kingdom	Challenger	Hard	(Cyprus) Marcos Baghdatis	1–6, 6–3, 2–6
Win	6–8	Nov 2004	Helsinki, Finland	Challenger	Hard	(Czech Republic) Lukáš Dlouhý	4–6, 6–4, 6–3
Win	7–8	Nov 2004	Groningen, Netherlands	Challenger	Hard	(Czech Republic) Ivo Minář	6–3, 6–2
Loss	7–9	Apr 2006	Saint Brieuc, France	Challenger	Hard	(France) Marc Gicquel	3–6, 1–6
Win	8–9	Mar 2007	Portugal F2, Lagos	Futures	Hard	(France) Clément Morel	6–3, 6–2

=== Doubles: 12 (5–7) ===
Legend ATP Challenger (4–7) ITF Futures (1–0)	Finals by surface Hard (0–3) Clay (4–3) Grass (0–0) Carpet (1–1)

Result	W–L	Date	Tournament	Tier	Surface	Partner	Opponents	Score
Loss	0–1	Jul 1997	Scheveningen, Netherlands	Challenger	Clay	(Netherlands) Raemon Sluiter	(Spain) Álex Calatrava (Belgium) Tom Vanhoudt	7–6, 2–6, 6–7
Loss	0–2	Feb 1998	Lippstadt, Germany	Challenger	Carpet	(Netherlands) Raemon Sluiter	(United Kingdom) Andrew Richardson (South Africa) Myles Wakefield	6–4, 6–7, 4–6
Win	1–2	Apr 1998	San Luis Potosí, Mexico	Challenger	Clay	(Netherlands) Edwin Kempes	(Puerto Rico) José Frontera (Canada) Bobby Kokavec	7–6, 4–6, 7–5
Win	2–2	Jun 1998	Prostějov, Czech Republic	Challenger	Clay	(Netherlands) Edwin Kempes	(Czech Republic) Tomáš Cibulec (Czech Republic) Tomáš Krupa	6–4, 7–5
Win	3–2	Sep 1998	Edinburgh, United Kingdom	Challenger	Clay	(Netherlands) Edwin Kempes	(South Africa) Marcos Ondruska (United Kingdom) Chris Wilkinson	6–7, 6–3, 6–2
Loss	3–3	Oct 1998	Santiago, Chile	Challenger	Clay	(Netherlands) Edwin Kempes	(Czech Republic) Ota Fukárek (Hungary) Attila Sávolt	6–7, 4–6
Loss	3–4	Oct 1998	São Paulo, Brazil	Challenger	Clay	(Netherlands) Edwin Kempes	(Argentina) Diego del Río (Argentina) Martín Rodríguez	6–7, 3–6
Win	4–4	Jan 2003	Great Britain F1, Glasgow	Futures	Carpet	(Netherlands) Edwin Kempes	(Switzerland) Marco Chiudinelli (South Africa) Wesley Moodie	2–6, 7–6^{(11–9)}, 7–6^{(7–5)}
Loss	4–5	Oct 2003	Réunion Island, Réunion	Challenger	Hard	(Netherlands) Fred Hemmes	(Argentina) Federico Browne (Netherlands) Rogier Wassen	1–6, 7–6^{(7–4)}, 3–6
Loss	4–6	Oct 2004	Bolton, United Kingdom	Challenger	Hard	(Netherlands) Melle van Gemerden	(South Africa) Jeff Coetzee (United States) Jim Thomas	5–7, 3–6
Win	5–6	Jul 2007	Scheveningen, Netherlands	Challenger	Clay	(Netherlands) Raemon Sluiter	(India) Rohan Bopanna (Uruguay) Pablo Cuevas	7–6^{(8–6)}, 7–5
Loss	5–7	Mar 2008	Sunrise, United States	Challenger	Hard	(Belgium) Kristof Vliegen	(Serbia) Janko Tipsarević (Serbia) Dušan Vemić	2–6, 6–7^{(5–7)}

== Junior Grand Slam finals ==
=== Doubles: 2 (1 title, 1 runner-up) ===
Result	Year	Tournament	Surface	Partner	Opponents	Score
Win	1995	French Open	Clay	(Netherlands) Raemon Sluiter	(United States) Justin Gimelstob (United States) Ryan Wolters	7–6, 7–5
Loss	1995	US Open	Hard	(Netherlands) Raemon Sluiter	(South Korea) Lee Jong-Min (Canada) Jocelyn Robichaud	6–7, 2–6

== Performance timeline ==
Key
W	F	SF	QF	#R	RR	Q#	DNQ	A	NH

(W) winner; (F) finalist; (SF) semifinalist; (QF) quarterfinalist; (#R) rounds 4, 3, 2, 1; (RR) round-robin stage; (Q#) qualification round; (DNQ) did not qualify; (A) absent; (NH) not held; (SR) strike rate (events won / competed); (W–L) win–loss record.

=== Singles ===
Tournament	1996	1997	1998	1999	2000	2001	2002	2003	2004	2005	2006	2007	2008	SR	W–L	Win%
Grand Slam tournaments
Australian Open	A	A	A	1R	1R	1R	Q1	A	Q1	2R	Q1	A	A	0 / 4	1–4	20%
French Open	A	A	Q2	Q1	Q1	Q1	A	A	Q2	2R	Q1	A	A	0 / 1	1–1	50%
Wimbledon	Q3	A	A	1R	A	1R	A	A	A	1R	Q2	A	A	0 / 3	0–3	0%
US Open	A	1R	Q1	3R	1R	Q1	Q1	A	Q3	2R	Q3	Q1	A	0 / 4	3–4	43%
Win–loss	0–0	0–1	0–0	2–3	0–2	0–2	0–0	0–0	0–0	3–4	0–0	0–0	0–0	0 / 12	5–12	29%
ATP World Tour Masters 1000
Miami	A	A	A	Q2	A	Q1	Q2	A	A	1R	A	A	Q1	0 / 1	0–1	0%
Rome	A	A	A	A	A	A	A	A	A	Q2	A	A	A	0 / 0	0–0	–
Cincinnati	A	A	A	A	Q1	A	A	A	A	A	A	A	A	0 / 0	0–0	–
Win–loss	0–0	0–0	0–0	0–0	0–0	0–0	0–0	0–0	0–0	0–1	0–0	0–0	0–0	0 / 1	0–1	0%
