= Melvyn op der Heijde =

Dutch tennis player (born 1975)

- Country (sports): Netherlands
- Born: 11 June 1975 (age 49); Hoorn, Netherlands
- Height: 1.80 m (5 ft 11 in)
- Plays: Right-handed
- Prize money: $100,988

Singles
- Highest ranking: No. 231 (10 Oct 2005)

Grand Slam singles results
- Australian Open: Q1 (2006)
- Wimbledon: Q2 (2002)
- US Open: Q1 (2005)

Doubles
- Highest ranking: No. 259 (26 Dec 2005)

Melvyn op der Heijde (born 11 June 1975) is a Dutch former professional tennis player.

Born in Hoorn, North Holland in 1975, Op der Heijde came late to professional tennis. As a 21-year old in 1996 he was playing in the third division of club tennis, but made improvements when he switched to Amstelpark. In 1999 he earned an international ranking and had a surprise win over leading Dutch player Paul Haarhuis, as well as securing his first ITF Futures title in Verona. During his career he won six singles and three doubles tournaments at Futures level. He achieved a best world ranking of 231 and featured in the qualifying draws in three of the four grand slams.

== ITF Futures titles ==
=== Singles: (6) ===
No.	Date	Tournament	Surface	Opponent	Score
1.	May 1999	Italy F7, Verona	Clay	(Austria) Rainer Falenti	6–3, 2–6, 6–3
2.	May 2004	USA F11, Orange Park	Clay	(United States) Goran Dragicevic	6–4, 6–0
3.	Nov 2004	China F3, Jiangmen	Hard	(China) Zhu Benqiang	6–4, 6–2
4.	Dec 2004	Qatar F5, Doha	Hard	(Russia) Artem Sitak	6–4, 6–3
5.	Jan 2005	UAE F1, Dubai	Hard	(Sweden) Alexander Hartman	6–4, 6–0
6.	Jun 2005	Netherlands F1, Alkmaar	Clay	(Germany) Torsten Popp	4–6, 7–6^{(5)}, 6–0

=== Doubles: (3) ===
No.	Date	Tournament	Surface	Partner	Opponents	Score
1.	Sep 2001	Netherlands F2, Alphen aan den Rijn	Clay	(Germany) Jan Weinzierl	(Azerbaijan) Emin Ağayev (United States) Thomas Blake	6–3, 6–4
2.	Sep 2001	Ukraine F2, Gorlivka	Clay	(Russia) Kirill Ivanov-Smolensky	(Croatia) Ivan Cinkus (Hungary) Gergely Kisgyörgy	6–2, 6–4
3.	Apr 2004	Germany F4, Riemerling	Clay	(Netherlands) Edwin Kempes	(Germany) Andreas Beck (Germany) Torsten Popp	7–5, 6–4
