= Fred Hemmes Jr. =

Dutch tennis player

- Country (sports): Netherlands
- Residence: Goirle
- Born: 28 January 1981 (age 45) Tilburg, Netherlands
- Height: 1.83 m (6 ft 0 in)
- Turned pro: 1999
- Plays: Right-handed
- Prize money: $142,365

Singles
- Career record: 1–3
- Career titles: 0
- Highest ranking: No. 188 (2 Feb 2004)

Doubles
- Career record: 2–6
- Career titles: 0
- Highest ranking: No. 107 (8 Mar 2004)

Fred Hemmes Jr. (born 28 January 1981) is a tennis coach and a former professional player from the Netherlands.

== Personal info ==
He is the son of Fred Hemmes Sr., a tennis player who competed at Wimbledon.

== Coaching Career ==
He was the coach of Botic van de Zandschulp in 2025.

He previously coached Kim Clijsters from 2020 to 2022 and Michael Geerts.

== Professional Career ==
Hemmes played mostly on the Challenger circuit, where he won six doubles titles.

The Dutchman had a win over Andrei Pavel, a former top 20 player, to qualify for the 2004 Heineken Open. He then defeated Robin Söderling in the opening round of the main draw.

A doubles specialist, Hemmes and partner Dennis van Scheppingen paired together to reach the quarterfinals at the 2003 Ordina Open and the 2004 Dutch Open.

== Challenger titles ==
=== Doubles: (6) ===
No.	Year	Tournament	Surface	Partner	Opponents in the final	Score in the final
1.	2002	Kyiv, Ukraine	Clay	(Argentina) Federico Browne	(Georgia (country)) Irakli Labadze (Kazakhstan) Yuri Schukin	6–4, 6–3
2.	2003	Montauban, France	Clay	(Netherlands) Rogier Wassen	(Argentina) Juan Pablo Guzmán (Argentina) Ignacio Hirigoyen	6–4, 6–4
3.	2003	Scheveningen, Netherlands	Clay	(Netherlands) Edwin Kempes	(Spain) Óscar Hernández (Spain) Salvador Navarro	3–6, 6–4, 6–3
4.	2004	Ho Chi Minh City, Vietnam	Hard	(South Africa) Rik de Voest	(Uzbekistan) Vadim Kutsenko (Kazakhstan) Yuri Schukin	6–3, 6–3
5.	2004	Kyoto, Japan	Carpet	(South Africa) Rik de Voest	(Chinese Taipei) Yen-Hsun Lu (United States) Jason Marshall	6–3, 6–7^{(8–10)}, 6–4
6.	2004	Hilversum, Netherlands	Clay	(Netherlands) Melle van Gemerden	(Hungary) Attila Sávolt (Romania) Gabriel Trifu	7–6^{(7–3)}, 7–6^{(7–3)}
