= Raemon Sluiter =

Dutch tennis player (born 1978)

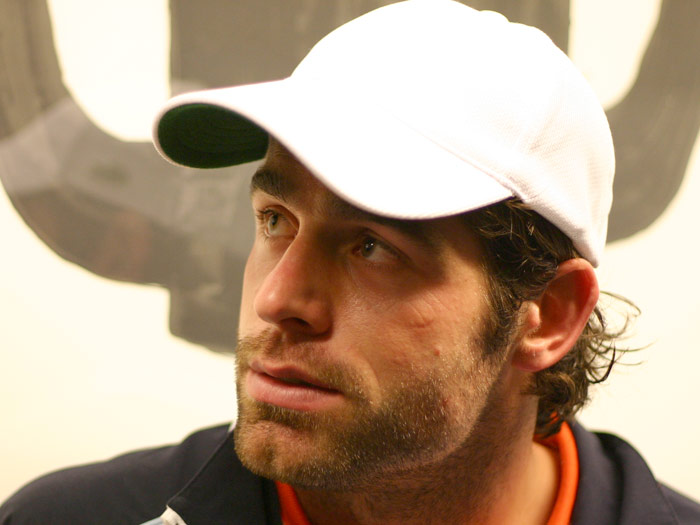
- Country (sports): Netherlands
- Residence: Rotterdam, Netherlands
- Born: 13 April 1978 (age 48) Rotterdam, Netherlands
- Height: 1.85 m (6 ft 1 in)
- Turned pro: 1996
- Retired: 2010
- Plays: Right-handed (two-handed both sides)
- Prize money: $1,726,539

Singles
- Career record: 90–131 (at ATP Tour level, Grand Slam level, and in Davis Cup)
- Career titles: 0
- Highest ranking: No. 46 (24 February 2003)

Grand Slam singles results
- Australian Open: 2R (2000, 2006)
- French Open: 3R (2004, 2006)
- Wimbledon: 3R (2001)
- US Open: 2R (2002, 2006)

Doubles
- Career record: 25–41 (at ATP Tour level, Grand Slam level, and in Davis Cup)
- Career titles: 0
- Highest ranking: No. 97 (8 September 2003)

Grand Slam doubles results
- Australian Open: 1R (2004)
- French Open: 2R (2003, 2004)
- Wimbledon: 2R (2004)
- US Open: 2R (2003)
- Last updated on: 23 January 2022.

Raemon Sluiter (Dutch pronunciation: [ˈreːmɔn ˈslœytər]; born 13 April 1978) is a Dutch tennis coach and a former professional player. His career-high ATP singles ranking is World No. 46, achieved in February 2003. Though he achieved only limited success during his professional career, Sluiter reached four ATP finals in his native Netherlands, and also reached the semifinals of the Davis Cup with the Dutch team in 2001. Also in 2003, he reached a career high doubles ranking of No. 97.

He announced his retirement in February 2008, which took effect after he played his home event in Rotterdam. In April 2009 he returned to professional tennis, reaching the final of an ITF Futures tournament in Albufeira, Portugal having entered the tournament in the qualifying rounds. In June 2009 he reached the final of the Ordina Open, becoming the lowest ranked professional player (866th) in history to reach an ATP final.

Sluiter's best performance in Grand Slam tournaments was the third round, which he reached at Wimbledon in 2001 and in the French Open in 2004 and 2006. In the first round of the 2003 Wimbledon Championships, Sluiter stunned 20th seed and former World #1 Yevgeny Kafelnikov in five sets for one of the biggest wins of his career.

== Junior career ==
Sluiter excelled as a junior and won the Boys' Doubles title at the 1995 French Open, alongside compatriot Peter Wessels. The pair also reached the final of the 1995 US Open Junior.

== Professional career ==
Sluiter turned professional in 1996, and broke into the ATP top 100 for the first time in 2000. In the same year, Sluiter qualified for his first Grand Slam tournament at the 2000 Australian Open, where he defeated Andrea Gaudenzi in five sets in the first round for his first Grand Slam victory. In the second round, he was defeated by 16th seed Mark Philippoussis in four sets. At the 2000 Energis Dutch Open, Sluiter reached his first ATP final on home soil, where he was defeated by the veteran Magnus Gustafsson.

In 2001, Sluiter achieved his best result at a Grand Slam tournament, by reaching the third round at Wimbledon, where he lost to Arnaud Clément in a closely contested four-set match. He equalled this achievement at the French Open in 2004 and 2006, losing to Carlos Moyá and Martín Vassallo Argüello, respectively.

Sluiter was part of the Netherlands team which reached the semi-finals of the 2001 Davis Cup. In his only rubber of the tie, Sluiter faced a rematch against Arnaud Clément, who had defeated him at that year's Wimbledon, but was forced to retire while leading 2–1 in the third set. The Dutch team went on to lose the tie 3–2.

Sluiter's greatest scalp at a Grand Slam tournament came at the 2003 Wimbledon Championships, where he defeated former world No. 1 Yevgeny Kafelnikov in five sets in the first round. In the following round, he lost to Alexander Popp in another five-set match. That year also saw Sluiter reach his career high singles ranking of world No. 46.

On 20 November 2006, Sluiter dropped out of the top 100 for the last time, but continued to be ranked in the top 200 until his retirement in 2008. Sluiter's final tournament was to be the 2008 ABN AMRO World Tennis Tournament in his hometown of Rotterdam. Having received a wild card into the main draw of the tournament, Sluiter was defeated by eventual champion Michaël Llodra in the first round.

In 2009, Sluiter made a comeback to professional tennis. In June, he received a wild card to the 2009 Ordina Open in Rosmalen. Despite being ranked 866th in the world at the time, Sluiter reached the final of the tournament, where he was defeated by Benjamin Becker. This made him the lowest ranked player ever to reach an ATP tour final. Sluiter announced his second retirement in 2010.

During his lengthy career, Sluiter reached four ATP World Tour finals, all in his native Netherlands. In addition to his final appearances in Amsterdam and Rosmalen, Sleuter reached finals in Rotterdam and Amersfoort in 2003, losing on both occasions. Despite his limited success on the main ATP circuit, Sluiter won 10 ATP Challenger Tour titles during his career.

Though a singles specialist, Sluiter was also an occasional doubles player. Partnering Martin Verkerk, he reached two doubles finals during his career, in Tashkent in 2002 and Delray Beach in 2003, losing both finals.

== Coaching career ==
After retiring from his playing career, Sluiter became a coach. In 2015, he began coaching Dutch player Kiki Bertens. In 2016, Bertens reached the semifinals of the French Open. They ended their partnership in 2019. In 2021, Sluiter began a brief partnership with Tallon Griekspoor, a Dutch player on the ATP tour. They stopped working together in late 2022.

Sluiter became coach of Ukrainian player Elina Svitolina in March 2023, after her return from maternity leave. She returned to competition in April on the ITF Tour. With Sluiter, Svitolina won de Internationaux de Strasbourg, a WTA 250 event in May 2023, and reached quarterfinals of the 2023 French Open and the semifinals of the 2023 Wimbledon Championships. He also briefly coached Maria Sakkari. Sluiter is currently coaching compatriot Botic van de Zandschulp.

== Junior Grand Slam finals ==
=== Doubles: 2 (1 title, 1 runner-up) ===
Result	Year	Tournament	Surface	Partner	Opponents	Score
Win	1995	French Open	Clay	(Netherlands) Peter Wessels	(United States) Justin Gimelstob (United States) Ryan Wolters	7–6, 7–5
Loss	1995	US Open	Hard	(Netherlands) Peter Wessels	(South Korea) Lee Jong-Min (Canada) Jocelyn Robichaud	6–7, 2–6

== ATP career finals ==
=== Singles: 4 (4 runner-ups) ===
Legend Grand Slam Tournaments (0–0) ATP World Tour Finals (0–0) ATP Masters Series (0–0) ATP Championship Series (0–1) ATP World Series (0–3)	Finals by surface Hard (0–1) Clay (0–2) Grass (0–1) Carpet (0–0)	Finals by setting Outdoors (0–3) Indoors (0–1)

Result	W–L	Date	Tournament	Tier	Surface	Opponent	Score
Loss	0–1	Jul 2000	Amsterdam, Netherlands	International Series	Clay	(Sweden) Magnus Gustafsson	7–6^{(7–4)}, 3–6, 6–7^{(5–7)}, 1–6
Loss	0–2	Feb 2003	Rotterdam, Netherlands	Championship Series	Hard (i)	(Belarus) Max Mirnyi	6–7^{(3–7)}, 4–6
Loss	0–3	Jul 2003	Amersfoort, Netherlands	International Series	Clay	(Chile) Nicolás Massú	4–6, 6–7^{(3–7)}, 2–6
Loss	0–4	Jun 2009	Rosmalen, Netherlands	International Series	Grass	(Germany) Benjamin Becker	5–7, 3–6

=== Doubles: 2 (2 runner-ups) ===
Legend Grand Slam Tournaments (0–0) ATP World Tour Finals (0–0) ATP Masters Series (0–0) ATP Championship Series (0–0) ATP World Series (0–2)	Finals by surface Hard (0–2) Clay (0–0) Grass (0–0) Carpet (0–0)	Finals by setting Outdoors (0–2) Indoors (0–0)

Result	W–L	Date	Tournament	Tier	Surface	Partner	Opponents	Score
Loss	0–1	Sep 2002	Tashkent, Uzbekistan	International Series	Hard	(Netherlands) Martin Verkerk	(South Africa) David Adams (South Africa) Robbie Koenig	2–6, 5–7
Loss	0–2	Mar 2003	Delray Beach, United States	International Series	Hard	(Netherlands) Martin Verkerk	(Socialist Federal Republic of Yugoslavia) Nenad Zimonjić (India) Leander Paes	5–7, 6–3, 5–7

== ATP Challenger and ITF Futures finals ==
=== Singles: 17 (10–7) ===
Legend ATP Challenger (10–5) ITF Futures (0–2)	Finals by surface Hard (0–4) Clay (4–2) Grass (1–0) Carpet (5–1)

Result	W–L	Date	Tournament	Tier	Surface	Opponent	Score
Win	1–0	Jul 1999	Bristol, United Kingdom	Challenger	Grass	(United Kingdom) Chris Wilkinson	6–3, 6–7, 7–6
Win	2–0	Nov 1999	Aachen, Germany	Challenger	Carpet	(Germany) David Prinosil	2–6, 6–4, 7–6
Loss	2–1	Oct 2000	Tulsa, United States	Challenger	Hard	(Venezuela) Jimy Szymanski	6–7^{(5–7)}, 7–6^{(7–5)}, 6–7^{(3–7)}
Win	3–1	Jul 2001	Scheveningen, Netherlands	Challenger	Clay	(France) Paul-Henri Mathieu	6–3, 6–4
Win	4–1	Feb 2002	Lübeck, Germany	Challenger	Carpet	(Germany) Alexander Popp	6–2, 3–0 ret.
Win	5–1	Mar 2002	Hamburg, Germany	Challenger	Carpet	(South Africa) Neville Godwin	6–1, 6–3
Win	6–1	Apr 2002	Tunis, Tunisia	Challenger	Clay	(Croatia) Mario Radić	6–2, 7–5
Win	7–1	Jul 2002	Scheveningen, Netherlands	Challenger	Clqy	(Spain) Salvador Navarro	7–6^{(8–6)}, 6–7^{(3–7)}, 7–6^{(7–4)}
Loss	7–2	Jul 2004	Scheveningen, Netherlands	Challenger	Clqy	(Netherlands) Peter Wessels	5–7, 6–7^{(7–9)}
Win	8–2	Feb 2005	Lübeck, Germany	Challenger	Carpet	(Germany) Alexander Waske	7–6^{(7–2)}, 7–6^{(12–10)}
Loss	8–3	Nov 2005	Aachen, Germany	Challenger	Carpet	(Russia) Evgeny Korolev	3–6, 6–7^{(7–9)}
Loss	8–4	Nov 2005	Dnipropetrovsk, Ukraine	Challenger	Hard	(Belgium) Dick Norman	6–7^{(2–7)}, 7–6^{(7–2)}, 3–6
Win	9–4	Nov 2005	Prague, Czech Republic	Challenger	Carpet	(France) Nicolas Thomann	6–3, 7–5
Loss	9–5	Oct 2006	Kolding, Denmark	Challenger	Hard	(France) Michaël Llodra	4–6, 4–6
Win	10–5	Jul 2007	Poznań, Poland	Challenger	Clay	(Brazil) Júlio Silva	6–4, 6–3
Loss	10–6	Mar 2009	Portugal F3, Albufeira	Futures	Hard	(Portugal) Leonardo Tavares	3–6, 4–6
Loss	10–7	May 2009	Czech Republic F3, Jablonec nad Nisou	Futures	Clay	(Hungary) Ádám Kellner	6–7^{(7–9)}, 6–4, 3–6

=== Doubles: 10 (6–4) ===
Legend ATP Challenger (5–4) ITF Futures (1–0)	Finals by surface Hard (1–2) Clay (4–1) Grass (0–0) Carpet (1–1)

Result	W–L	Date	Tournament	Tier	Surface	Partner	Opponents	Score
Loss	0–1	Jul 1997	Scheveningen, Netherlands	Challenger	Clay	(Netherlands) Peter Wessels	(Spain) Álex Calatrava (Belgium) Tom Vanhoudt	7–6, 2–6, 6–7
Loss	0–2	Feb 1998	Lippstadt, Germany	Challenger	Carpet	(Netherlands) Peter Wessels	(United Kingdom) Andrew Richardson (South Africa) Myles Wakefield	6–4, 6–7, 4–6
Win	1–2	May 1998	China F1, Beijing	Futures	Hard	(South Korea) Kim Dong-Hyun	(Japan) Hiroki Ishii (Japan) Hideki Kaneko	6–1, 6–7, 6–2
Win	2–2	Sep 1998	Belgrade, Serbia	Challenger	Clay	(Socialist Federal Republic of Yugoslavia) Nenad Zimonjić	(Lebanon) Ali Hamadeh (Sweden) Johan Landsberg	6–4, 6–4
Win	3–2	Oct 1998	Eckental, Germany	Challenger	Carpet	(Czech Republic) Tomáš Cibulec	(United Kingdom) Barry Cowan (Switzerland) Filippo Veglio	7–6, 6–3
Loss	3–3	Oct 2000	Austin, United States	Challenger	Hard	(Netherlands) Dennis Van Scheppingen	(Australia) Tim Crichton (Australia) Ashley Fisher	1–6, 7–6^{(8–6)}, 0–6
Loss	3–4	Oct 2003	Groningen, Netherlands	Challenger	Hard	(Netherlands) Fred Hemmes	(Israel) Amir Hadad (Israel) Harel Levy	4–6, 4–6
Win	4–4	Jul 2004	Scheveningen, Netherlands	Challenger	Clay	(Netherlands) Paul Logtens	(Italy) Enzo Artoni (Argentina) Juan Pablo Brzezicki	6–2, 7–5
Win	5–4	Jul 2007	Scheveningen, Netherlands	Challenger	Clay	(Netherlands) Peter Wessels	(India) Rohan Bopanna (Uruguay) Pablo Cuevas	7–6^{(8–6)}, 7–5
Win	6–4	Aug 2009	Vigo, Spain	Challenger	Clay	(Netherlands) Thiemo de Bakker	(Spain) Albert Ramos Viñolas (Spain) Pedro Clar	7–6^{(7–5)}, 6–2

== Performance timeline ==
Key
W	F	SF	QF	#R	RR	Q#	DNQ	A	NH

(W) winner; (F) finalist; (SF) semifinalist; (QF) quarterfinalist; (#R) rounds 4, 3, 2, 1; (RR) round-robin stage; (Q#) qualification round; (DNQ) did not qualify; (A) absent; (NH) not held; (SR) strike rate (events won / competed); (W–L) win–loss record.

=== Singles ===
Tournament	1996	1997	1998	1999	2000	2001	2002	2003	2004	2005	2006	2007	SR	W–L	Win%
Grand Slam tournaments
Australian Open	A	A	A	A	2R	1R	1R	1R	1R	1R	2R	Q3	0 / 7	2–7	22%
French Open	A	A	A	Q1	Q2	1R	1R	1R	3R	1R	3R	Q2	0 / 6	4–6	40%
Wimbledon	Q1	A	A	A	A	3R	2R	2R	1R	1R	A	A	0 / 5	4–5	44%
US Open	A	A	A	Q1	A	1R	2R	1R	1R	A	2R	Q1	0 / 5	2–5	29%
Win–loss	0–0	0–0	0–0	0–0	1–1	2–4	2–4	1–4	2–4	0–3	4–3	0–0	0 / 23	12–23	34%
ATP World Tour Masters 1000
Indian Wells	A	A	A	A	A	Q1	A	A	3R	A	A	A	0 / 1	2–1	67%
Miami	A	A	A	A	Q1	Q1	1R	1R	1R	A	1R	2R	0 / 5	1–5	17%
Monte Carlo	A	A	A	A	A	A	A	1R	A	A	A	A	0 / 1	0–1	0%
Hamburg	A	A	A	A	A	A	A	1R	A	A	A	A	0 / 1	0–1	0%
Rome	A	A	A	A	A	A	A	2R	Q1	A	A	A	0 / 1	1–1	50%
Madrid	Not Held						A	Q2	A	A	A	A	0 / 0	0–0	–
Canada	A	A	A	A	A	A	A	1R	A	A	A	A	0 / 1	0–1	0%
Win–loss	0–0	0–0	0–0	0–0	0–0	0–0	0–1	1–5	2–2	0–0	0–1	1–1	0 / 10	4–10	29%

== Personal life ==
Sluiter was born in Rotterdam. His father, Fred, was a caretaker at his former school and his mother, Cisca, worked as a part-time cleaner. He is a supporter of his local football team, Feyenoord, and during the 2003–04 season he was the club's official ambassador. He also enjoys snooker and is a fan of the band Pearl Jam. His girlfriend is former field hockey player Fatima Moreira de Melo.

Awards
Preceded by Robert Eenhoorn	Rotterdam Sportsman of the Year; 2000–2002	Succeeded by Francisco Elson
