= José Frontera =

Puerto Rican tennis player

- Country (sports): Puerto Rico
- Born: 31 January 1971 (age 54)
- Plays: Right-handed
- Prize money: $31,089

Singles
- Career record: 0–0
- Career titles: 0; 0 Challenger, 0 Futures
- Highest ranking: No. 1120 (16 September 1996)

Doubles
- Career record: 0–4
- Career titles: 0; 2 Challenger, 1 Futures
- Highest ranking: No. 196 (7 February 2000)

Grand Slam doubles results
- Wimbledon: Q1 (1997, 1998, 1999)

José Frontera (born 31 January 1971) is a former Puerto Rican tennis player.

Frontera has a career high ATP singles ranking of world No. 1120 achieved on 16 September 1996. He also has a career high ATP doubles ranking of world No. 196 achieved on 7 February 2000.

Frontera has reached six career doubles finals, with a record of 3 wins and 3 losses including a 2–2 record in ATP Challenger Tour finals. He never managed to reach a final in singles.

== ATP Challenger and ITF Futures finals ==
=== Doubles: 6 (3–3) ===
Legend ATP Challenger (2–2) ITF Futures (1–1)	Finals by surface Hard (0–0) Clay (3–2) Grass (0–0) Carpet (0–1)

Result	W–L	Date	Tournament	Tier	Surface	Partner	Opponents	Score
Win	1–0	Aug 1996	Samarkand, Uzbekistan	Challenger	Clay	(Uzbekistan) Oleg Ogorodov	(Slovakia) Martin Hromec (Netherlands) Rogier Wassen	6–3, 6–4
Loss	1–1	Apr 1998	San Luis Potosí, Mexico	Challenger	Clay	(Canada) Bobby Kokavec	(Netherlands) Edwin Kempes (Netherlands) Peter Wessels	6–7, 6–4, 5–7
Loss	1–2	Aug 1999	Nettingsdorf, Austria	Challenger	Clay	(Argentina) Marcelo Charpentier	(Austria) Georg Blumauer (Austria) Alexander Peya	7–6, 3–6, 6–7
Win	2–2	Sep 1999	Seville, Spain	Challenger	Clay	(Argentina) Marcelo Charpentier	(Spain) Eduardo Nicolás Espin (Spain) Germán Puentes Alcañiz	7–5, 6–3
Loss	2–3	Apr 2000	France F8, Melun	Futures	Carpet	(Australia) Ashley Fisher	(Germany) Andreas Tattermusch (Germany) Andreas Weber	6–7^{(6–8)}, 6–4, 6–7^{(3–7)}
Win	3–3	May 2000	Great Britain F4, Hatfield	Futures	Clay	(Romania) Ionuț Moldovan	(Czech Republic) František Čermák (Czech Republic) Radovan Svetlik	7–5, 6–4
