= Edwin Kempes =

Dutch tennis player (born 1976)

- Country (sports): Netherlands
- Residence: Monnickendam, Netherlands
- Born: 23 June 1976 (age 49); Amsterdam, Netherlands
- Height: 1.88 m (6 ft 2 in)
- Turned pro: 1995
- Retired: 2005
- Plays: Right-handed
- Coach: Nick Carr
- Prize money: $322,221

Singles
- Career record: 11–18
- Career titles: 0; 3 Challenger, 1 Futures
- Highest ranking: No. 98 (21 May 2001)

Grand Slam singles results
- Australian Open: 1R (1999)
- French Open: Q3 (1998)
- Wimbledon: 1R (2001)
- US Open: 1R (2001, 2002)

Doubles
- Career record: 5–7
- Career titles: 0; 9 Challenger, 2 Futures
- Highest ranking: No. 80 (19 October 1998)

Grand Slam doubles results
- Australian Open: 1R (1999)
- US Open: Q1 (1999)
- Last updated on: 25 July 2022.

Edwin Kempes (Dutch pronunciation: [ˈɛtʋɪŋ ˈkɛmpəs]; born 23 June 1976) is a retired Dutch tennis player, who had turned professional in 1995. Kempes reached his career-high ATP Tour singles ranking of world No. 98 in May 2001.

== ATP career finals ==
=== Doubles: 1 (1 runner-up) ===
Legend Grand Slam Tournaments (0–0) ATP World Tour Finals (0–0) ATP Masters 1000 Series (0–0) ATP 500 Series (0–0) ATP 250 Series (0–1)	Finals by surface Hard (0–0) Clay (0–1) Grass (0–0) Carpet (0–0)	Finals by setting Outdoors (0–1) Indoors (0–0)

Result	W–L	Date	Tournament	Tier	Surface	Partner	Opponents	Score
Loss	0–1	Jul 2000	Amsterdam, Netherlands	International Series	Clay	(Netherlands) Dennis van Scheppingen	(Argentina) Sergio Roitman (Argentina) Andrés Schneiter	6–4, 4–6, 1–6

== ATP Challenger and ITF Futures finals ==
=== Singles: 6 (4–2) ===
Legend ATP Challenger (3–2) ITF Futures (1–0)	Finals by surface Hard (0–0) Clay (4–2) Grass (0–0) Carpet (0–0)

Result	W–L	Date	Tournament	Tier	Surface	Opponent	Score
Win	1–0	Jun 1998	Eisenach, Germany	Challenger	Clay	(Italy) Marco Meneschincheri	7–6, 6–3
Win	2–0	Jul 1998	Montauban, France	Challenger	Clay	(Austria) Wolfgang Schranz	7–5, 6–3
Win	3–0	May 2000	Budapest, Hungary	Challenger	Clay	(France) Jérôme Golmard	6–4, ret.
Loss	3–1	Aug 2000	Mönchengladbach, Germany	Challenger	Clay	(Russia) Nikolay Davydenko	3–6, 6–3, 3–6
Loss	3–2	Sep 2000	Linz, Austria	Challenger	Clay	(Spain) Germán Puentes Alcañiz	6–7^{(7–9)}, 1–6
Win	4–2	May 2003	Germany F3, Arnsberg	Futures	Clay	(Germany) Tobias Summerer	6–2, 6–2

=== Doubles: 18 (11–7) ===
Legend ATP Challenger (9–6) ITF Futures (2–1)	Finals by surface Hard (0–0) Clay (10–7) Grass (0–0) Carpet (1–0)

Result	W–L	Date	Tournament	Tier	Surface	Partner	Opponents	Score
Win	1–0	Oct 1997	Seoul, South Korea	Challenger	Clay	(Japan) Gouichi Motomura	(France) Jérôme Golmard (France) Régis Lavergne	7–5, 7–5
Win	2–0	Apr 1998	San Luis Potosí, Mexico	Challenger	Clay	(Netherlands) Peter Wessels	(Puerto Rico) José Frontera (Canada) Bobby Kokavec	7–6, 4–6, 7–5
Win	3–0	Jun 1998	Prostějov, Czech Republic	Challenger	Clay	(Netherlands) Peter Wessels	(Czech Republic) Tomáš Cibulec (Czech Republic) Tomáš Krupa	6–4, 7–5
Loss	3–1	Jul 1998	Montauban, France	Challenger	Clay	(Netherlands) Rogier Wassen	(Spain) Eduardo Nicolás Espin (Spain) Germán Puentes Alcañiz	5–7, 5–7
Win	4–1	Jul 1998	Newcastle, United Kingdom	Challenger	Clay	(South Africa) Jeff Coetzee	(Socialist Federal Republic of Yugoslavia) Nebojsa Djordjevic (Socialist Federal Republic of Yugoslavia) Dušan Vemić	1–6, 7–6, 6–2
Win	5–1	Sep 1998	Edinburgh, United Kingdom	Challenger	Clay	(Netherlands) Rogier Wassen	(South Africa) Marcos Ondruska (United Kingdom) Chris Wilkinson	6–7, 6–3, 6–2
Loss	5–2	Sep 1998	Seville, Spain	Challenger	Clay	(Netherlands) Rogier Wassen	(Spain) Alberto Martín (Spain) Salvador Navarro-Gutierrez	6–2, 5–7, 3–6
Loss	5–3	Oct 1998	Santiago, Chile	Challenger	Clay	(Netherlands) Rogier Wassen	(Czech Republic) Ota Fukárek (Hungary) Attila Sávolt	6–7, 4–6
Loss	5–4	Oct 1998	São Paulo, Brazil	Challenger	Clay	(Netherlands) Rogier Wassen	(Argentina) Diego del Río (Argentina) Martín Rodríguez	6–7, 3–6
Loss	5–5	Nov 1998	Toluca, Mexico	Challenger	Clay	(Netherlands) Rogier Wassen	(Mexico) Alejandro Hernández (Mexico) Mariano Sánchez	3–6, 4–6
Win	6–5	Jul 1999	Oberstaufen, Germany	Challenger	Clay	(Czech Republic) Petr Luxa	(Germany) Karsten Braasch (Germany) Jens Knippschild	7–5, 6–4
Loss	6–6	May 2001	Antwerp, Belgium	Challenger	Clay	(Netherlands) Dennis Van Scheppingen	(Spain) Juan Giner (Canada) Jerry Turek	7–6^{(7–4)}, 6–7^{(2–7)}, 3–6
Win	7–6	Jun 2002	Eisenach, Germany	Challenger	Clay	(Netherlands) Martin Verkerk	(Brazil) Marcos Daniel (Chile) Adrián García	6–3, 6–4
Win	8–6	Jul 2002	Scheveningen, Netherlands	Challenger	Clay	(Netherlands) Martin Verkerk	(Argentina) Mariano Hood (Argentina) Sebastián Prieto	6–4, 6–4
Win	9–6	Jan 2003	Great Britain F1, Glasgow	Futures	Carpet	(Netherlands) Peter Wessels	(Switzerland) Marco Chiudinelli (South Africa) Wesley Moodie	2–6, 7–6^{(11–9)}, 7–6^{(7–5)}
Win	10–6	Jul 2003	Scheveningen, Netherlands	Challenger	Clay	(Netherlands) Fred Hemmes Jr.	(Spain) Óscar Hernández (Spain) Salvador Navarro	3–6, 6–4, 6–3
Loss	10–7	Aug 2003	Netherlands F4, Enschede	Futures	Clay	(Netherlands) Paul Logtens	(Sweden) Robert Lindstedt (Romania) Gabriel Trifu	walkover
Win	11–7	Apr 2004	Germany F4, Riemerling	Futures	Clay	(Netherlands) Melvyn op der Heijde	(Germany) Andreas Beck (Germany) Torsten Popp	7–5, 6–4

== Performance timeline ==
Key
W	F	SF	QF	#R	RR	Q#	P#	DNQ	A	Z#	PO	G	S	B	NMS	NTI	P	NH

(W) winner; (F) finalist; (SF) semifinalist; (QF) quarterfinalist; (#R) rounds 4, 3, 2, 1; (RR) round-robin stage; (Q#) qualification round; (P#) preliminary round; (DNQ) did not qualify; (A) absent; (Z#) Davis/Fed Cup Zonal Group (with number indication) or (PO) play-off; (G) gold, (S) silver or (B) bronze Olympic/Paralympic medal; (NMS) not a Masters tournament; (NTI) not a Tier I tournament; (P) postponed; (NH) not held; (SR) strike rate (events won / competed); (W–L) win–loss record.

=== Singles ===
Tournament	1997	1998	1999	2000	2001	2002	SR	W–L	Win%
Grand Slam tournaments
Australian Open	A	A	1R	Q2	Q3	Q3	0 / 1	0–1	0%
French Open	A	Q3	A	A	A	Q2	0 / 0	0–0	–
Wimbledon	A	A	A	A	1R	A	0 / 1	0–1	0%
US Open	Q2	A	Q1	A	1R	1R	0 / 2	0–2	0%
Win–loss	0–0	0–0	0–1	0–0	0–2	0–1	0 / 4	0–4	0%
ATP Tour Masters 1000
Miami	A	A	Q1	A	1R	Q1	0 / 1	0–1	0%
Win–loss	0–0	0–0	0–0	0–0	0–1	0–0	0 / 1	0–1	0%
