= Dennis van Scheppingen =

Dutch tennis player

- Country (sports): Netherlands
- Residence: Wilnis, Netherlands
- Born: 5 July 1975 (age 50) Mijdrecht, Netherlands
- Height: 1.85 m (6 ft 1 in)
- Turned pro: 1993
- Retired: 2008
- Plays: Right-handed (two-handed backhand)
- Coach: Dick Duijk
- Prize money: $871,886

Singles
- Career record: 42–73
- Career titles: 0
- Highest ranking: No. 72 (13 September 2004)

Grand Slam singles results
- Australian Open: 3R (1997)
- French Open: 2R (1997)
- Wimbledon: 2R (1997)
- US Open: 1R (1997, 1998, 2004)

Doubles
- Career record: 12–22
- Career titles: 0
- Highest ranking: No. 154 (16 July 2001)

Team competitions
- Davis Cup: QF (2005)
- Last updated on: 8 February 2022.

Dennis van Scheppingen (Dutch pronunciation: [ˈdɛnɪs fɑn ˈsxɛpɪŋə(n)]; born 5 July 1975) is a Dutch former professional tennis player. Turning pro in 1993, right-hander van Scheppingen reached his highest individual ranking on the ATP Tour on 13 September 2004, when he became world No. 72.

== Performance timeline ==
Key
W	F	SF	QF	#R	RR	Q#	DNQ	A	NH

(W) winner; (F) finalist; (SF) semifinalist; (QF) quarterfinalist; (#R) rounds 4, 3, 2, 1; (RR) round-robin stage; (Q#) qualification round; (DNQ) did not qualify; (A) absent; (NH) not held; (SR) strike rate (events won / competed); (W–L) win–loss record.

=== Singles ===
Tournament	1995	1996	1997	1998	1999	2000	2001	2002	2003	2004	2005	2006	2007	SR	W–L	Win %
Grand Slam tournaments
Australian Open	A	A	3R	1R	A	A	A	Q1	A	1R	A	A	A	0 / 3	2–3	40%
French Open	Q1	Q2	2R	Q1	Q1	A	Q1	Q1	Q1	1R	A	A	Q1	0 / 2	1–2	33%
Wimbledon	Q1	A	2R	A	A	A	A	A	A	1R	A	A	Q1	0 / 2	1–2	33%
US Open	A	Q1	1R	1R	A	A	A	A	Q2	1R	Q2	A	A	0 / 3	0–3	0%
Win–loss	0–0	0–0	4–4	0–2	0–0	0–0	0–0	0–0	0–0	0–4	0–0	0–0	0–0	0 / 10	4–10	29%
ATP Tour Masters 1000
Indian Wells	A	A	A	A	Q1	A	A	A	A	A	A	A	A	0 / 0	0–0	–
Miami	A	Q3	1R	3R	Q1	A	A	Q2	A	A	A	A	A	0 / 2	2–2	50%
Win–loss	0–0	0–0	0–1	2–1	0–0	0–0	0–0	0–0	0–0	0–0	0–0	0–0	0–0	0 / 2	2–2	50%

== ATP career finals ==
=== Doubles: 1 (1 runner-up) ===
Legend Grand Slam Tournaments (0–0) ATP World Tour Finals (0–0) ATP Masters Series (0–0) ATP Championship Series (0–0) ATP International Series (0–1)	Finals by surface Hard (0–0) Clay (0–1) Grass (0–0) Carpet (0–0)	Finals by setting Outdoors (0–1) Indoors (0–0)

Result	W–L	Date	Tournament	Tier	Surface	Partner	Opponents	Score
Loss	0–1	Jul 2000	Amsterdam, Netherlands	International Series	Clay	(Netherlands) Edwin Kempes	(Argentina) Sergio Roitman (Argentina) Andrés Schneiter	6–4, 4–6, 1–6

== ATP Challenger and ITF Futures finals ==
=== Singles: 20 (13–7) ===
Legend ATP Challenger (11–7) ITF Futures (2–0)	Finals by surface Hard (3–4) Clay (7–3) Grass (0–0) Carpet (3–0)

Result	W–L	Date	Tournament	Tier	Surface	Opponent	Score
Win	1–0	Jun 1996	Eisenach, Germany	Challenger	Clay	(Czech Republic) David Škoch	6–4, 6–0
Win	2–0	Jul 1996	Scheveningen, Netherlands	Challenger	Clay	(Slovakia) Dominik Hrbatý	4–6, 6–3, 6–2
Loss	2–1	Oct 1997	Santiago, Chile	Challenger	Clay	(Argentina) Guillermo Cañas	6–4, 5–7, 3–6
Loss	2–2	Mar 2000	Bombay, India	Challenger	Hard	(India) Leander Paes	6–7^{(2–7)}, 2–3 ret.
Win	3–2	Sep 2000	Netherlands F1, Alphen	Futures	Clay	(Netherlands) Marc Merry	6–3, 6–1
Win	4–2	Sep 2000	Netherlands F2, Hilversum	Futures	Clay	(Brazil) Flávio Saretta	7–6^{(9–7)}, 3–6, 7–6^{(7–5)}
Win	5–2	Feb 2001	Chandigarh, India	Challenger	Hard	(Israel) Noam Okun	6–3, 7–5
Loss	5–3	Aug 2001	Sylt, Germany	Challenger	Clay	(Spain) Salvador Navarro	3–6, 6–7^{(7–9)}
Win	6–3	Aug 2001	Geneva, Switzerland	Challenger	Clay	(Croatia) Zeljko Krajan	6–3, 6–2
Loss	6–4	Nov 2001	Bolton, United Kingdom	Challenger	Hard	(Belgium) Olivier Rochus	4–6, 6–7^{(3–7)}
Win	7–4	Sep 2002	Freudenstadt, Germany	Challenger	Clay	(Spain) Didac Pérez	6–1, 6–1
Win	8–4	Sep 2002	Budapest, Hungary	Challenger	Clay	(Spain) Salvador Navarro	3–6, 6–3, 6–4
Win	9–4	Feb 2003	Belgrade, Yugoslavia	Challenger	Carpet	(Germany) Markus Hantschk	7–5, 6–3
Loss	9–5	Sep 2003	Seoul, South Korea	Challenger	Hard	(South Korea) Lee Hyung-taik	3–6, 3–6
Win	10–5	Nov 2003	Eckental, Germany	Challenger	Carpet	(Sweden) Joachim Johansson	5–7, 6–3, 7–6^{(7–3)}
Win	11–5	Nov 2003	Milan, Italy	Challenger	Carpet	(Belarus) Vladimir Voltchkov	5–7, 6–4, 7–6^{(7–5)}
Win	12–5	Mar 2004	Wrexham, United Kingdom	Challenger	Hard	(Czech Republic) Jan Vacek	6–4, 6–1
Loss	12–6	Mar 2004	Sarajevo, Bosnia & Herzegovina	Challenger	Hard	(Belgium) Gilles Elseneer	6–7^{(5–7)}, 3–6
Loss	12–7	Jul 2004	Hilversum, Netherlands	Challenger	Clay	(Germany) Philipp Kohlschreiber	6–4, 4–6, 4–6
Win	13–7	Mar 2005	Salinas, Ecuador	Challenger	Hard	(Brazil) Franco Ferreiro	6–2, 6–4

=== Doubles: 7 (3–4) ===
Legend ATP Challenger (1–4) ITF Futures (2–0)	Finals by surface Hard (0–1) Clay (3–3) Grass (0–0) Carpet (0–0)

Result	W–L	Date	Tournament	Tier	Surface	Partner	Opponents	Score
Loss	0–1	Jul 1996	Scheveningen, Netherlands	Challenger	Clay	(Netherlands) Martijn Bok	(United States) Brandon Coupe (South Africa) Paul Rosner	1–6, 6–3, 0–6
Win	1–1	Sep 2000	Netherlands F1, Alphen	Futures	Clay	(Netherlands) Marc Merry	(Argentina) Leonardo Olguín (Argentina) Marcello Wowk	6–4, 7–5
Loss	1–2	Oct 2000	Austin, United States	Challenger	Hard	(Netherlands) Raemon Sluiter	(Australia) Tim Crichton (Australia) Ashley Fisher	1–6, 7–6^{(8–6)}, 0–6
Loss	1–3	May 2001	Antwerp, Belgium	Challenger	Clay	(Netherlands) Edwin Kempes	(Spain) Juan Giner (Canada) Jerry Turek	7–6^{(7–4)}, 6–7^{(2–7)}, 3–6
Win	2–3	Aug 2001	Sylt, Germany	Challenger	Clay	(Netherlands) Bobbie Altelaar	(Switzerland) Rico Jacober (New Zealand) Mark Nielsen	7–6^{(7–3)}, 6–1
Loss	2–4	Sep 2005	Brașov, Romania	Challenger	Clay	(Netherlands) Melvyn op der Heijde	(Romania) Ionuț Moldovan (Romania) Gabriel Moraru	1–6, 4–6
Win	3–4	Aug 2014	Germany F10, Wetzlar	Futures	Clay	(Netherlands) David Pel	(Germany) Julian Lenz (Germany) Lars Pörschke	7–6^{(7–2)}, 7–6^{(7–5)}
