= Ivo Heuberger =

Swiss tennis player

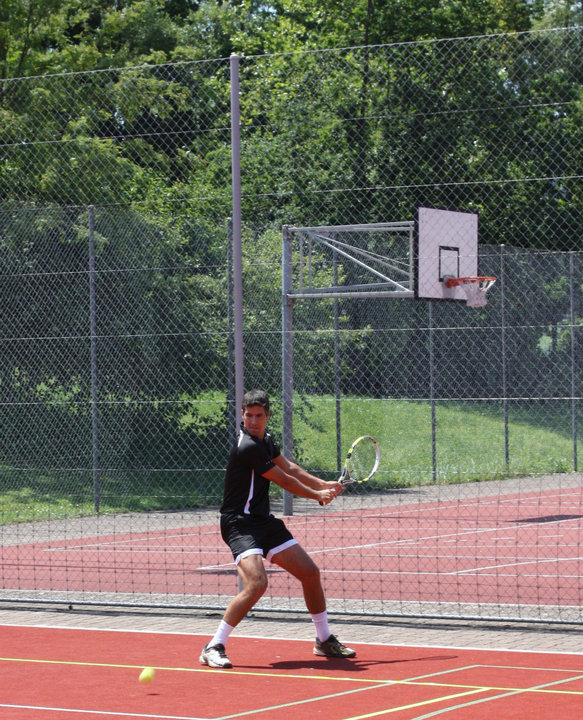
- Country (sports): Switzerland
- Residence: Altstätten, Switzerland
- Born: 19 February 1976 (age 49); Altstätten, Switzerland
- Height: 1.88 m (6 ft 2 in)
- Turned pro: 1997
- Retired: 2006
- Plays: Right-handed (two-handed backhand)
- Prize money: US$950,068

Singles
- Career record: 34–78
- Career titles: 0
- Highest ranking: No. 102 (6 May 2002)

Grand Slam singles results
- Australian Open: 2R (2001)
- French Open: 1R (2002, 2003)
- Wimbledon: 2R (2004)
- US Open: 2R (2002)

Doubles
- Career record: 12–27
- Career titles: 0
- Highest ranking: No. 114 (19 November 2001)

Team competitions
- Davis Cup: QF (1998, 1999, 2004)

Ivo Heuberger (born 19 February 1976) is a retired tennis player who represented Switzerland at the Davis Cup.

== Early life ==
Ivo Heuberger was born in the small town of Altstätten, Switzerland on 19 February 1976. He began his tennis career after moving to the French part of Switzerland to attend the National Training Center. He showed promise during his junior days and was eager to begin his professional debut.

== Tennis career ==
Ivo turned pro in 1997. He won his first title in India at a small $25,000 Challenger, beating Danai Udomchoke 6–2, 6–3.

Ivo was chosen to represent Switzerland along with the rest of the Swiss Davis Cup team 7 times during his career.

His career was one that had few highlights. He was best known in the tennis world, possibly, for his relationship with former world #1 Martina Hingis. His best ranking was 102, and he remained in the 100s for much of his career. He is what most in the tennis world call a "journeyman"—one who spends much of his career on the Challenger circuit and in ATP qualifying draws.

He defeated Roger Federer in qualifying at the 1999 US Open, in perhaps his most notable win. Ivo defeated the then 18-year-old Federer in the second round of qualifying in straight sets. Roger Federer never failed to advance to the main draw of a Grand Slam tournament, for the next 21 years, after that loss.

== Business career ==
Ivo began putting to use the many contacts he had made over the years while traveling to 60 different countries. He founded a company called Hi-Pro in the summer of 2004. His company specializes in marketing and promotional products and has since grown to be one of the biggest companies in its field in Switzerland. In 2006, Ivo Heuberger and the Swiss Tennis team federation signed a deal that would make Hi-Pro the official clothing provider for the Swiss Davis Cup Team. Hi-Pro now also provides the official staff uniforms for the Basel Swiss Indoor Tennis Tournament.

== Personal life ==
In September 2007, Ivo married Martha Dominguez who is a Miami-based influencer. He currently splits his time between Zurich and Miami Beach with his wife and two children, Mia and Alexander Heuberger. Both of his children are avid golfers and compete in the junior circuit.

Both children competed and claimed the National Championship title in their respective age divisions during the 2024 Under Armour Winter Nationals.

Alexander won the US Kids European Championship Boys 9 in May 2025. Mia came in as runner-up in the US Kids World Championship girls 12 in August 2025.
