= Andrei Stoliarov =

Russian tennis player

Andrei Stoliarov Андрей Столяров
- Country (sports): Russia
- Born: 9 January 1977 (age 49) Sochi, Soviet Union
- Height: 1.77 m (5 ft 9 1/2 in)
- Turned pro: 1995
- Retired: 2008
- Plays: Right-handed (two-handed backhand)
- Prize money: $732,336

Singles
- Career record: 37–58
- Career titles: 0
- Highest ranking: No. 71 (10 September 2001)

Grand Slam singles results
- Australian Open: 1R (2000, 2001)
- French Open: 2R (2000, 2001, 2002)
- Wimbledon: 3R (2001)
- US Open: 2R (2000)

Doubles
- Career record: 5–19
- Career titles: 0
- Highest ranking: No. 151 (23 October 2000)

Team competitions
- Davis Cup: W (2002)
Medal record
Summer Universiade
Bronze medal – third place	1995 Fukuoka	Doubles

Andrei Iurievich Stoliarov (Russian: Андрей Юрьевич Столяров, born 9 January 1977) is a Russian professional tennis player and a former member of the Russia Davis Cup team.

Stoliarov gained entry to the 2002 French Open as a lucky loser, where he won his first round match against Jonas Björkman. In the second round, Stoliarov led world number 1 Lleyton Hewitt 6–4, 5–0, before Hewitt fought back to win 4–6, 7–6^{(5)}, 6–0, 7–5.

== Career finals ==
=== Singles (1 loss) ===
Result	W/L	Date	Tournament	Surface	Opponent	Score
Loss	0–1	Jan 2001	Chennai, India	Hard	(Czech Republic) Michal Tabara	2–6, 6–7^{(4–7)}

== Team titles ==
2002 - Davis Cup winner with Russia
