= 1999 Australian Open – Men's singles qualifying =

Men's singles qualifying
- 1999 Australian Open

Events
Singles	men	women		boys	girls
Doubles	men	women	mixed	boys	girls
WC Singles	men	women	quad
WC Doubles	men	women	quad
Legends	men	women	mixed

Qualification
Singles	men	women
- Australian Open

This article displays the qualifying draw for the men's singles main draw at the 1999 Australian Open.

== Seeds ==
1. (Germany) Rainer Schüttler (qualifier)
2. (Argentina) Lucas Arnold Ker (moved to main draw)
3. (Belgium) Johan van Herck (first round)
4. (Germany) Marc-Kevin Goellner (second round)
5. (Bulgaria) Orlin Stanoytchev (first round)
6. (Germany) Bernd Karbacher (qualifying competition, lucky loser)
7. (Italy) Marzio Martelli (qualifying competition)
8. (Brazil) André Sá (first round)
9. (United States) Cecil Mamiit (qualifier)
10. (Germany) Christian Vinck (second round)
11. (Brazil) Márcio Carlsson (qualifier)
12. (Germany) Dirk Dier (second round)
13. (South Africa) David Nainkin (second round)
14. (Austria) Markus Hipfl (qualifier)
15. (Spain) Oscar Serrano (qualifying competition, lucky loser)
16. (France) Jean-Baptiste Perlant (first round)
17. (United States) Brian MacPhie (qualifying competition)
18. (Belgium) Christophe van Garsse (second round)
19. (South Africa) Marcos Ondruska (qualifier)
20. (Switzerland) Ivo Heuberger (qualifying competition)
21. (France) Antony Dupuis (second round)
22. (Spain) Jacobo Díaz (qualifying competition)
23. (Norway) Jan Frode Andersen (qualifying competition)
24. (United States) Alex O'Brien (second round)
25. (Germany) Lars Burgsmüller (qualifier)
26. (South Africa) Neville Godwin (first round)
27. (Netherlands) Edwin Kempes (qualifier)
28. (Spain) Javier Sánchez (qualifier)
29. (United States) Richey Reneberg (second round)
30. (Austria) Wolfgang Schranz (first round)
31. (Ecuador) Luis Morejón (qualifying competition)
32. (Argentina) Sebastián Prieto (first round)
33. (Belarus) Vladimir Voltchkov (qualifier)

== Qualifiers ==
1. (Germany) Rainer Schüttler
2. (Belarus) Vladimir Voltchkov
3. (United States) Paul Goldstein
4. (South Africa) Justin Bower
5. (Netherlands) Edwin Kempes
6. (Spain) Javier Sánchez
7. (Germany) Lars Burgsmüller
8. (France) Stéphane Huet
9. (United States) Cecil Mamiit
10. (Sweden) Fredrik Jonsson
11. (Brazil) Márcio Carlsson
12. (Russia) Andrei Cherkasov
13. (South Africa) Marcos Ondruska
14. (Austria) Markus Hipfl
15. (United States) David Caldwell
16. (Czech Republic) Petr Luxa

=== Lucky losers ===
1. (Germany) Bernd Karbacher
2. (Spain) Oscar Serrano

== Qualifying draw ==
Key

- Q = Qualifier
- WC = Wild card
- LL = Lucky loser
- Alt = Alternate
- ITF = ITF entry
- PR = Protected ranking
- SR = Special ranking
- SE = Special exempt
- JE = Junior exempt
- JR = Junior Accelerator Programme entrant
- CO = College Accelerator Programme entrant
- NG = Next Gen Accelerator Program entrant
- w/o = Walkover
- r = Retired
- d = Defaulted

=== First qualifier ===
First round
1	(Germany) Rainer Schüttler	6	6
(The Bahamas) Mark Knowles	0	1
(Australia) Matthew Breen	6	1	3
(South Africa) Louis Vosloo	1	6	6
(Germany) Karsten Braasch	6	6
(Austria) Julian Knowle	2	3
(United States) Jared Palmer	6	6
32	(Argentina) Sebastián Prieto	4	1

Second round
1	(Germany) Rainer Schüttler	6	6
(South Africa) Louis Vosloo	1	3
(Germany) Karsten Braasch	6	7^{7}
(United States) Jared Palmer	4	6^{5}

Qualifying competition
1	(Germany) Rainer Schüttler	6	6
(Germany) Karsten Braasch	2	3

=== Second qualifier ===
First round
33	(Belarus) Vladimir Voltchkov	6	7^{7}
(South Korea) Lee Hyung-taik	1	6^{3}
(France) Julien Boutter	4	6^{4}
(Belarus) Max Mirnyi	6	7^{7}
(Slovenia) Borut Urh	5	3
(Japan) Takahiro Terachi	7	6
(Netherlands) Martijn Belgraver	1	4
31	(Ecuador) Luis Morejón	6	6

Second round
33	(Belarus) Vladimir Voltchkov	7^{8}	7
(Belarus) Max Mirnyi	6^{6}	5
(Japan) Takahiro Terachi	4	1
31	(Ecuador) Luis Morejón	6	6

Qualifying competition
33	(Belarus) Vladimir Voltchkov	6	6
31	(Ecuador) Luis Morejón	2	3

=== Third qualifier ===
First round
3	(Belgium) Johan van Herck	7^{7}	3	3
(Spain) Joan Balcells	6^{5}	6	6
WC	(Australia) Matthew Fitzgerald	2	0
(United States) Mashiska Washington	6	6
(Germany) Markus Hantschk	4	3
(United States) Paul Goldstein	6	6
(Zimbabwe) Kevin Ullyett	3	2
29	(United States) Richey Reneberg	6	6

Second round
(Spain) Joan Balcells	6	7
(United States) Mashiska Washington	1	5
(United States) Paul Goldstein	6	6
29	(United States) Richey Reneberg	4	4

Qualifying competition
(Spain) Joan Balcells	6^{5}	2
(United States) Paul Goldstein	7^{7}	6

=== Fourth qualifier ===
First round
4	(Germany) Marc-Kevin Goellner	6	6^{5}	6
(Israel) Oren Motevassel	1	7^{7}	2
WC	(Australia) Peter Clarke	4	6	4
(Japan) Kotaro Miyachi	6	4	6
(South Africa) Justin Bower	7	6
(United Kingdom) Andrew Richardson	5	1
(Sweden) Jan Apell	1	6	6
30	(Austria) Wolfgang Schranz	6	1	2

Second round
4	(Germany) Marc-Kevin Goellner	6^{6}	6	4
(Japan) Kotaro Miyachi	7^{8}	2	6
(South Africa) Justin Bower	6	6
(Sweden) Jan Apell	4	4

Qualifying competition
(Japan) Kotaro Miyachi	4	4
(South Africa) Justin Bower	6	6

=== Fifth qualifier ===
First round
5	(Bulgaria) Orlin Stanoytchev	6^{0}	4
(United States) Doug Flach	7^{7}	6
(France) Olivier Delaître	6	6
(Switzerland) Roger Federer	4	4
(Argentina) Mariano Hood	6	6
(Federal Republic of Yugoslavia) Nenad Zimonjić	3	3
(Israel) Harel Levy	4	4
27	(Netherlands) Edwin Kempes	6	6

Second round
(United States) Doug Flach	6	7^{9}
(France) Olivier Delaître	1	6^{7}
(Argentina) Mariano Hood	4	6^{5}
27	(Netherlands) Edwin Kempes	6	7^{7}

Qualifying competition
(United States) Doug Flach	2	7^{7}	1
27	(Netherlands) Edwin Kempes	6	6^{5}	6

=== Sixth qualifier ===
First round
6	(Germany) Bernd Karbacher	6	7^{7}
(Argentina) Juan Ignacio Chela	3	6^{3}
(Spain) Salvador Navarro-Gutiérrez	6^{6}	6	6
WC	(Australia) Glenn Knox	7^{8}	2	2
(Belgium) Christophe Rochus	6	6
(Australia) James Sekulov	3	3
PR	(Hungary) József Krocskó	4	2
28	(Spain) Javier Sánchez	6	6

Second round
6	(Germany) Bernd Karbacher	7	6
(Spain) Salvador Navarro-Gutiérrez	5	3
(Belgium) Christophe Rochus	6^{6}	4
28	(Spain) Javier Sánchez	7^{8}	6

Qualifying competition
6	(Germany) Bernd Karbacher	4	6	3
28	(Spain) Javier Sánchez	6	3	6

=== Seventh qualifier ===
First round
7	(Italy) Marzio Martelli	6	6
(United Kingdom) Miles Maclagan	4	4
(South Africa) Damien Roberts	1	3
(United Kingdom) Barry Cowan	6	6
WC	(Australia) Jordan Kerr	6	6^{2}	6
WC	(Australia) David McNamara	3	7^{7}	2
(Italy) Giorgio Galimberti	3	6^{3}
25	(Germany) Lars Burgsmüller	6	7^{7}

Second round
7	(Italy) Marzio Martelli	3	6	8
(United Kingdom) Barry Cowan	6	1	6
WC	(Australia) Jordan Kerr	6	5	4
25	(Germany) Lars Burgsmüller	2	7	6

Qualifying competition
7	(Italy) Marzio Martelli	6^{2}	2
25	(Germany) Lars Burgsmüller	7^{7}	6

=== Eighth qualifier ===
First round
8	(Brazil) André Sá	6	2	4
(France) Stéphane Huet	3	6	6
(Australia) Steven Randjelovic	6	4	6
(Australia) Sebastien Swierk	4	6	2
(Japan) Gouichi Motomura	6	7
WC	(Australia) Jaymon Crabb	3	5
(United States) Michael Sell	6^{2}	2
26	(South Africa) Neville Godwin	7^{7}	2^{r}

Second round
(France) Stéphane Huet	6	6
(Australia) Steven Randjelovic	1	1
(Japan) Gouichi Motomura	2	7	6
(United States) Michael Sell	6	5	2

Qualifying competition
(France) Stéphane Huet	6^{6}	6	6
(Japan) Gouichi Motomura	7^{8}	2	3

=== Ninth qualifier ===
First round
9	(United States) Cecil Mamiit	6	6
(Brazil) Daniel Melo	3	1
WC	(Australia) Paul Hanley	3	1
(Sweden) Henrik Andersson	6	6
(United States) Michael Joyce	4	7^{7}	6
(Sweden) Nicklas Kulti	6	6^{5}	3
WC	(Australia) Tate Roberts	0	1
24	(United States) Alex O'Brien	6	6

Second round
9	(United States) Cecil Mamiit	6	6
(Sweden) Henrik Andersson	3	2
(United States) Michael Joyce	7^{7}	6
24	(United States) Alex O'Brien	6^{3}	1

Qualifying competition
9	(United States) Cecil Mamiit	6	6
(United States) Michael Joyce	3	2

=== Tenth qualifier ===
First round
10	(Germany) Christian Vinck	7	6
(Sweden) Patrik Fredriksson	5	1
(Finland) Ville Liukko	6^{3}	2
(Sweden) Fredrik Jonsson	7^{7}	6
(South Africa) Wesley Whitehouse	6	3	6
(South Africa) Jeff Coetzee	2	6	3
(Slovakia) Tomáš Čatár	4	6	7
23	(Norway) Jan Frode Andersen	6	4	9

Second round
10	(Germany) Christian Vinck	2	5
(Sweden) Fredrik Jonsson	6	7
(South Africa) Wesley Whitehouse	3	4
23	(Norway) Jan Frode Andersen	6	6

Qualifying competition
(Sweden) Fredrik Jonsson	7^{7}	6
23	(Norway) Jan Frode Andersen	6^{0}	3

=== Eleventh qualifier ===
First round
11	(Brazil) Márcio Carlsson	6	6
(South Korea) Yoon Yong-il	2	2
(Hungary) Attila Sávolt	6	4	3
(Spain) Francisco Roig	4	6	6
(Sweden) Federico Rovai	6	3	6
(Argentina) Andrés Zingman	2	6	3
(United Kingdom) Jamie Delgado	4	6	9
22	(Spain) Jacobo Díaz	6	3	11

Second round
11	(Brazil) Márcio Carlsson	7	3	6
(Spain) Francisco Roig	5	6	2
(Sweden) Federico Rovai	6	6^{2}	1^{r}
22	(Spain) Jacobo Díaz	1	7^{7}	3

Qualifying competition
11	(Brazil) Márcio Carlsson	6	6
22	(Spain) Jacobo Díaz	3	2

=== Twelfth qualifier ===
First round
12	(Germany) Dirk Dier	6	6
(United States) Taylor Dent	0	2
(Australia) Ben Ellwood	6^{4}	6	3
(Spain) Francisco Costa	7^{7}	2	6
(Czech Republic) Jiří Vaněk	7	3	1
(Russia) Andrei Cherkasov	5	6	6
(Sweden) Lars Jönsson	6	3	1
21	(France) Antony Dupuis	3	6	6

Second round
12	(Germany) Dirk Dier	6^{4}	6	6
(Spain) Francisco Costa	7^{7}	4	8
(Russia) Andrei Cherkasov	6	6
21	(France) Antony Dupuis	0	1

Qualifying competition
(Spain) Francisco Costa	2	4
(Russia) Andrei Cherkasov	6	6

=== Thirteenth qualifier ===
First round
13	(South Africa) David Nainkin	6	6
(Russia) Andrey Merinov	1	4
(Spain) Emilio Benfele Álvarez	4	4
(Australia) Michael Hill	6	6
(Sweden) Kalle Flygt	3	4
(United States) Jonathan Stark	6	6
(Spain) Álex López Morón	6	3	4
19	(South Africa) Marcos Ondruska	2	6	6

Second round
13	(South Africa) David Nainkin	5	2
(Australia) Michael Hill	7	6
(United States) Jonathan Stark	4	2
19	(South Africa) Marcos Ondruska	6	6

Qualifying competition
(Australia) Michael Hill	3	2
19	(South Africa) Marcos Ondruska	6	6

=== Fourteenth qualifier ===
First round
14	(Austria) Markus Hipfl	7^{11}	6
(Brazil) Ricardo Schlachter	6^{9}	1
(United States) Michael Russell	5	6^{5}
(Germany) Tomas Behrend	7	7^{7}
(Thailand) Paradorn Srichaphan	7^{8}	6
(United States) Kevin Kim	6^{6}	3
(Brazil) Paulo Taicher	6^{5}	7	3
20	(Switzerland) Ivo Heuberger	7^{7}	5	6

Second round
14	(Austria) Markus Hipfl	6	6
(Germany) Tomas Behrend	1	4
(Thailand) Paradorn Srichaphan	2	6	3
20	(Switzerland) Ivo Heuberger	6	2	6

Qualifying competition
14	(Austria) Markus Hipfl	2	7^{7}	6
20	(Switzerland) Ivo Heuberger	6	6^{5}	3

=== Fifteenth qualifier ===
First round
15	(Spain) Oscar Serrano	5	6	2
(Australia) Allen Belobrajdic	7	1	0^{r}
(Australia) Grant Doyle	6	7^{7}
Alt	(Greece) Anastasios Vasiliadis	4	6^{4}
WC	(Australia) Dejan Petrović	6	3	4
(United States) David Caldwell	3	6	6
(Australia) Todd Larkham	4	4
18	(Belgium) Christophe van Garsse	6	6

Second round
15	(Spain) Oscar Serrano	6	6
(Australia) Grant Doyle	4	0
(United States) David Caldwell	3	6	6
18	(Belgium) Christophe van Garsse	6	2	2

Qualifying competition
15	(Spain) Oscar Serrano	4	1
(United States) David Caldwell	6	6

=== Sixteenth qualifier ===
First round
16	(France) Jean-Baptiste Perlant	6^{5}	6^{5}
(Belgium) Réginald Willems	7^{7}	7^{7}
(Czech Republic) Petr Luxa	6	6
(Slovenia) Iztok Božič	4	3
(United States) David DiLucia	6^{5}	4
(Italy) Igor Gaudi	7^{7}	6
(New Zealand) Mark Nielsen	6^{6}	3
17	(United States) Brian MacPhie	7^{8}	6

Second round
(Belgium) Réginald Willems	6^{5}	2
(Czech Republic) Petr Luxa	7^{7}	6
(Italy) Igor Gaudi	6	6^{4}	2
17	(United States) Brian MacPhie	4	7^{7}	6

Qualifying competition
(Czech Republic) Petr Luxa	7	6
17	(United States) Brian MacPhie	5	4
