= 1999 Australian Open – Women's singles qualifying =

Women's singles qualifying
- 1999 Australian Open

Events
Singles	men	women		boys	girls
Doubles	men	women	mixed	boys	girls
WC Singles	men	women	quad
WC Doubles	men	women	quad
Legends	men	women	mixed

Qualification
Singles	men	women
- Australian Open

== Seeds ==
1. (Poland) Aleksandra Olsza (first round)
2. (United States) Jolene Watanabe (qualifying competition)
3. (Canada) Maureen Drake (Qualifier)
4. (United States) Alexandra Stevenson (first round)
5. (Austria) Barbara Schwartz (moved to main draw)
6. (Austria) Patricia Wartusch (first round)
7. (Netherlands) Amanda Hopmans (first round)
8. (Italy) Francesca Lubiani (second round)
9. (Austria) Karin Kschwendt (second round)
10. (Hungary) Anna Földényi (second round)
11. (Australia) Kerry-Anne Guse (first round)
12. (France) Laurence Andretto (first round)
13. (Slovenia) Tina Križan (Qualifier)
14. (Russia) Nadia Petrova (Qualifier)
15. (South Africa) Surina De Beer (second round)
16. (Germany) Julia Abe (withdrew)
17. (Austria) Marion Maruska (second round)

== Qualifiers ==
1. (Russia) Nadia Petrova
2. (United States) Jill Craybas
3. (Canada) Maureen Drake
4. (Czech Republic) Lenka Němečková
5. (United States) Erika deLone
6. (Slovenia) Tina Križan
7. (Czech Republic) Sandra Kleinová
8. (Russia) Elena Dementieva

== Qualifying draw ==
Key

- Q = Qualifier
- WC = Wild card
- LL = Lucky loser
- Alt = Alternate
- ITF = ITF entry
- PR = Protected ranking
- SR = Special ranking
- SE = Special exempt
- JE = Junior exempt
- JR = Junior Accelerator Programme entrant
- CO = College Accelerator Programme entrant
- NG = Next Gen Accelerator Program entrant
- w/o = Walkover
- r = Retired
- d = Defaulted

=== First qualifier ===
First round
1	(Poland) Aleksandra Olsza	4	1
(United States) Jackie Trail	6	6
WC	(Australia) Rennae Stubbs	6	6
(Israel) Hila Rosen	1	3
(Kazakhstan) Irina Selyutina	6	6
(Germany) Gabriela Kučerová	2	3
WC	(Australia) Christina Wheeler	6	4	3
14	(Russia) Nadia Petrova	4	6	6

Second round
(United States) Jackie Trail	2	1
WC	(Australia) Rennae Stubbs	6	6
(Kazakhstan) Irina Selyutina	3	2
14	(Russia) Nadia Petrova	6	6

Qualifying competition
WC	(Australia) Rennae Stubbs	2	3
14	(Russia) Nadia Petrova	6	6

=== Second qualifier ===
First round
9	(Austria) Karin Kschwendt	6	3	8
(Austria) Sandra Dopfer	4	6	6
(China) Yi Jing-qian	1	4
(Romania) Andreea Vanc	6	6
(United States) Lindsay Lee	5	6	5
(Spain) Eva Bes-Ostariz	7	1	7
(United States) Jill Craybas	6	6
Alt	(Hungary) Kyra Nagy	4	1

Second round
9	(Austria) Karin Kschwendt	6	5	3
(Romania) Andreea Vanc	4	7	6
(Spain) Eva Bes-Ostariz	1	1
(United States) Jill Craybas	6	6

Qualifying competition
(Romania) Andreea Vanc	5	5
(United States) Jill Craybas	7	7

=== Third qualifier ===
First round
3	(Canada) Maureen Drake	7	7^{10}
Alt	(United States) Katie Schlukebir	5	6^{8}
(Japan) Rika Hiraki	6	6
(Spain) Gisela Riera	4	4
(Belgium) Patty Van Acker	6	6
(Hungary) Nóra Köves	4	2
(Indonesia) Wynne Prakusya	5
11	(Australia) Kerry-Anne Guse	2^{r}

Second round
3	(Canada) Maureen Drake	6	6
(Japan) Rika Hiraki	4	3
(Belgium) Patty Van Acker	1	3
(Indonesia) Wynne Prakusya	6	6

Qualifying competition
3	(Canada) Maureen Drake	6	6
(Indonesia) Wynne Prakusya	4	2

=== Fourth qualifier ===
First round
17	(Austria) Marion Maruska	5	6	6
(Spain) Mariam Ramon Climent	7	3	4
WC	(Australia) Kristen van Elden	2	0
(Czech Republic) Lenka Němečková	6	6
(Spain) Alicia Ortuño	4	7^{7}	5
(Germany) Anca Barna	6	6^{4}	7
(South Korea) Cho Yoon-jeong	4	6	1
8	(Italy) Francesca Lubiani	6	2	6

Second round
17	(Austria) Marion Maruska	3	1
(Czech Republic) Lenka Němečková	6	6
(Germany) Anca Barna	6	3	6
8	(Italy) Francesca Lubiani	4	6	4

Qualifying competition
(Czech Republic) Lenka Němečková	6	7^{7}
(Germany) Anca Barna	4	6^{1}

=== Fifth qualifier ===
First round
7	(Netherlands) Amanda Hopmans	3	3
WC	(Australia) Monique Adamczak	6	6
(United States) Erika deLone	6	6
(United States) Lisa McShea	3	4
(Hungary) Petra Mandula	6	6
WC	(Australia) Trudi Musgrave	4	2
(Bulgaria) Svetlana Krivencheva	4	6^{5}
10	(Hungary) Anna Földényi	6	7^{7}

Second round
WC	(Australia) Monique Adamczak	6^{3}	5
(United States) Erika deLone	7^{7}	7
(Hungary) Petra Mandula	6	6
10	(Hungary) Anna Földényi	0	1

Qualifying competition
(United States) Erika deLone	6	7
(Hungary) Petra Mandula	2	5

=== Sixth qualifier ===
First round
13	(Slovenia) Tina Križan	6^{6}	6	6
(Australia) Amanda Grahame	7^{8}	0	3
WC	(Australia) Bryanne Stewart	6	6
(Spain) Paula Hermida	1	4
WC	(Australia) Melanie-Ann Clayton	6	6^{6}	7
(France) Noëlle van Lottum	1	7^{8}	5
(United Kingdom) Julie Pullin	6	1	6
4	(United States) Alexandra Stevenson	1	6	0

Second round
13	(Slovenia) Tina Križan	6	6
WC	(Australia) Bryanne Stewart	2	3
WC	(Australia) Melanie-Ann Clayton	6	3	2
(United Kingdom) Julie Pullin	3	6	6

Qualifying competition
13	(Slovenia) Tina Križan	6	6
(United Kingdom) Julie Pullin	3	4

=== Seventh qualifier ===
First round
6	(Austria) Patricia Wartusch	7	6^{7}	3
(United Kingdom) Louise Latimer	5	7^{9}	6
(India) Nirupama Vaidyanathan	7^{7}	6
(South Korea) Kim Eun-ha	6^{4}	0
(Czech Republic) Sandra Kleinová	6	4	6
(United States) Mashona Washington	1	6	2
(United Kingdom) Karen Cross	2	2
15	(South Africa) Surina De Beer	6	6

Second round
(United Kingdom) Louise Latimer	3	1
(India) Nirupama Vaidyanathan	6	6
(Czech Republic) Sandra Kleinová	6	6
15	(South Africa) Surina De Beer	3	1

Qualifying competition
(India) Nirupama Vaidyanathan	4	4
(Czech Republic) Sandra Kleinová	6	6

=== Eighth qualifier ===
First round
12	(France) Laurence Andretto	4	1
(Russia) Elena Dementieva	6	6
(Japan) Haruka Inoue	4	3
WC	(Australia) Melissa Dowse	6	6
(South Africa) Liezel Horn	6	6
(Hungary) Katalin Marosi	3	0
(Italy) Alice Canepa	2	1
2	(United States) Jolene Watanabe	6	6

Second round
(Russia) Elena Dementieva	6	6
WC	(Australia) Melissa Dowse	2	1
(South Africa) Liezel Horn	1	7^{7}	5
2	(United States) Jolene Watanabe	6	6^{3}	7

Qualifying competition
(Russia) Elena Dementieva	6	6
2	(United States) Jolene Watanabe	3	3
