= 1999 Australian Open – Boys' singles =

Boys' singles
- 1999 Australian Open

Final
- Champion: (Denmark) Kristian Pless
- Runner-up: (Russia) Mikhail Youzhny
- Score: 6–4, 6–3

Events
Singles	men	women		boys	girls
Doubles	men	women	mixed	boys	girls
WC Singles	men	women	quad
WC Doubles	men	women	quad
Legends	men	women	mixed
- Australian Open

Julien Jeanpierre was the defending champion, but did not compete this year.
Danish first seed Kristian Pless won the title, defeating Russian ninth seed Mikhail Youzhny in the final, 6–4, 6–3.

== Seeds ==
1. (Denmark) Kristian Pless (champion)
2. (Finland) Jarkko Nieminen (third round)
3. (Czech Republic) Ladislav Chramosta (second round)
4. (France) Éric Prodon (quarterfinals)
5. (Czech Republic) Jaroslav Levinský (semifinals)
6. (Austria) Jürgen Melzer (third round)
7. (United States) Andy Roddick (third round)
8. (France) Jean-Christophe Faurel (quarterfinals)
9. (Russia) Mikhail Youzhny (final)
10. (United States) David Martin (second round)
11. (United States) Simone Amorico (quarterfinals)
12. (Sweden) Joachim Johansson (third round)
13. (South Africa) Andrew McDade (third round)
14. (United Kingdom) Mark Hilton (second round)
15. (Italy) Francesco Aldi (semifinals)
16. (United States) Alex Bogomolov Jr. (second round)

== Draw ==
Key

- Q = Qualifier
- WC = Wild card
- LL = Lucky loser
- Alt = Alternate
- ITF = ITF entry
- PR = Protected ranking
- SR = Special ranking
- SE = Special exempt
- JE = Junior exempt
- JR = Junior Accelerator Programme entrant
- CO = College Accelerator Programme entrant
- NG = Next Gen Accelerator Program entrant
- w/o = Walkover
- r = Retired
- d = Defaulted

=== Finals ===
Quarterfinals
1	(Denmark) Kristian Pless	6	7
8	(France) Jean-Christophe Faurel	4	6
(United States) Levar Harper-Griffith	1	4
15	(Italy) Francesco Aldi	6	6
5	(Czech Republic) Jaroslav Levinský	3	6	9
4	(France) Éric Prodon	6	0	7
11	(United States) Simone Amorico	4	2
9	(Russia) Mikhail Youzhny	6	6

Semifinals
1	(Denmark) Kristian Pless	6	6
15	(Italy) Francesco Aldi	1	1
5	(Czech Republic) Jaroslav Levinský	6	5
9	(Russia) Mikhail Youzhny	7	7

Final
1	(Denmark) Kristian Pless	6	6
9	(Russia) Mikhail Youzhny	4	3

=== Top half ===
==== Section 1 ====
First round
1	(Denmark) Kristian Pless	6	6
(Belgium) Jeroen Masson	2	1
WC	(Australia) Marc Kimmich	1	1
(Egypt) Mamoun Mohamed	6	6
(Finland) Timo Nieminen	6	6
Q	(Australia) Alex Bucewicz	3	2
LL	(Australia) Graydon Moore	0	1
10	(United States) David Martin	6	6
13	(South Africa) Andrew McDade	6	6
WC	(Australia) Samuel Fletcher	3	4
Q	(Australia) Marcin Losinski	6	6	6
LL	(Australia) Milos Nikolic	3	7	2
LL	(United States) Timothy Martin	6	3	1
(Germany) Maximilian Abel	4	6	6
Q	(Australia) Anthony Hampson	5	0
8	(France) Jean-Christophe Faurel	7	6

Second round
1	(Denmark) K Pless	6	6
(Egypt) M Mohamed	1	1
(Finland) T Nieminen	7	6
10	(United States) D Martin	6	4
13	(South Africa) A McDade	6	6
Q	(Australia) M Losinski	3	4
(Germany) M Abel	3	3
8	(France) J-C Faurel	6	6

Third round
1	(Denmark) K Pless	6	6
(Finland) T Nieminen	2	0
13	(South Africa) A McDade	2	6
8	(France) J-C Faurel	6	7

Quarterfinals
1	(Denmark) K Pless	6	7
8	(France) J-C Faurel	4	6

==== Section 2 ====
First round
3	(Czech Republic) Ladislav Chramosta	6	6
(South Africa) Andrew Anderson	4	2
LL	(Greece) Alex Jakupovic	4	2
(United States) Levar Harper-Griffith	6	6
(Canada) Charles-Antoine Sévigny	1	2
(United Kingdom) Lee Childs	6	6
WC	(Australia) Sadik Kadir	2	4
12	(Sweden) Joachim Johansson	6	6
15	(Italy) Francesco Aldi	6	6
(France) Julien Maes	4	2
(Germany) Boris Bachert	3	6
(South Africa) Peter-John Nomdo	6	7
WC	(Australia) Glen Bertram	2	3
(Portugal) Gonçalo Figueiredo	6	6
(Norway) Stian Boretti	6	5	3
7	(United States) Andy Roddick	2	7	6

Second round
3	(Czech Republic) L Chramosta	6	3	2
(United States) L Harper-Griffith	2	6	6
(United Kingdom) L Childs	6	3
12	(Sweden) J Johansson	7	6
15	(Italy) F Aldi	4	6	6
(South Africa) P-J Nomdo	6	1	1
(Portugal) G Figueiredo	2	3
7	(United States) A Roddick	6	6

Third round
(United States) L Harper-Griffith	6	6
12	(Sweden) J Johansson	3	0
15	(Italy) F Aldi	7	6
7	(United States) A Roddick	6	3

Quarterfinals
(United States) L Harper-Griffith	1	4
15	(Italy) F Aldi	6	6

=== Bottom half ===
==== Section 3 ====
First round
5	(Czech Republic) Jaroslav Levinský	6	7
(Germany) Christian-Michael Straka	3	6
Q	(Canada) Philip Gubenco	6	6
LL	(Australia) David Laverty	4	2
(South Africa) Evan Fowler	2	6	5
(Australia) Domenic Marafiote	6	2	7
(United States) Bo Hodge	6	5
14	(United Kingdom) Mark Hilton	7	7
16	(United States) Alex Bogomolov Jr.	7	4	7
WC	(Australia) Jed Stanford	5	6	5
WC	(Australia) Daniel Wendler	1	6	8
WC	(Australia) Matthew Fitzgerald	6	2	10
Q	(Australia) Michael Staniak	7	7
(New Zealand) Lee Radovanovich	5	5
(Hong Kong) Wong Wing-luen	2	4
4	(France) Éric Prodon	6	6

Second round
5	(Czech Republic) J Levinský	6	6
Q	(Canada) P Gubenco	4	3
(Australia) D Marafiote	6	4	6
14	(United Kingdom) M Hilton	3	6	4
16	(United States) A Bogomolov Jr.	6	5	4
WC	(Australia) M Fitzgerald	2	7	6
Q	(Australia) M Staniak	2	2
4	(France) É Prodon	6	6

Third round
5	(Czech Republic) J Levinský	5	6	6
(Australia) D Marafiote	7	4	0
WC	(Australia) M Fitzgerald	6	6	4
4	(France) É Prodon	7	4	6

Quarterfinals
5	(Czech Republic) J Levinský	3	6	9
4	(France) É Prodon	6	0	7

==== Section 4 ====
First round
6	(Austria) Jürgen Melzer	6	6
(Denmark) Mik Ledvonova	4	4
(France) Thierry Ascione	6	6
Q	(Australia) Sebastian Nawrocki	1	4
(Czech Republic) Michal Navrátil	3	1
Q	(Greece) Lefteris Alexiou	6	6
(South Africa) Dirk Stegmann	2	3
11	(United States) Simone Amorico	6	6
9	(Russia) Mikhail Youzhny	6	6
WC	(Australia) Rameez Junaid	1	4
(Italy) Stefano Mocci	6	7
(South Africa) Roger Anderson	1	6
(United States) Mardy Fish	6	6
(Canada) Chris Gostek	3	3
Q	(Australia) Kirk Jackson	2	0
2	(Finland) Jarkko Nieminen	6	6

Second round
6	(Austria) J Melzer	6	6
(France) T Ascione	3	3
Q	(Greece) L Alexiou	6	2
11	(United States) S Amorico	7	6
9	(Russia) M Youzhny	1	6	6
(Italy) S Mocci	6	2	4
(United States) M Fish	4	3
2	(Finland) J Nieminen	6	6

Third round
6	(Austria) J Melzer	4	1
11	(United States) S Amorico	6	6
9	(Russia) M Youzhny	6	7
2	(Finland) J Nieminen	4	5

Quarterfinals
11	(United States) S Amorico	4	2
9	(Russia) M Youzhny	6	6
