= 1999 Australian Open – Boys' doubles =

Boys' doubles
- 1999 Australian Open

Final
- Champions: (Austria) Jürgen Melzer (Denmark) Kristian Pless
- Runners-up: (Czech Republic) Ladislav Chramosta (Czech Republic) Michal Navrátil
- Score: 6–7, 6–3, 6–0

Events
Singles	men	women		boys	girls
Doubles	men	women	mixed	boys	girls
WC Singles	men	women	quad
WC Doubles	men	women	quad
Legends	men	women	mixed
- Australian Open

Jérôme Haehnel and Julien Jeanpierre were the defending champions, but they did not compete in the Junior's this year.
Jürgen Melzer and Kristian Pless won in the final 6–7, 6–3, 6–0, against Ladislav Chramosta and Michal Navrátil.

== Seeds ==
1. (United States) Bo Hodge / (United States) David Martin (first round)
2. (Czech Republic) Ladislav Chramosta / (Czech Republic) Michal Navrátil (final)
3. (Austria) Jürgen Melzer / (Denmark) Kristian Pless (champions)
4. (Italy) Francesco Aldi / (Italy) Stefano Mocci (semifinals)
5. (South Africa) Andrew McDade / (South Africa) Dirk Stegmann (first round)
5. (Norway) Stian Boretti / (Norway) Jørgen Vestli (first round)
6. (United States) Simone Amorico / (United States) Alex Bogomolov Jr. (first round)
7. (Germany) Boris Bachert / (Germany) Christian-Michael Straka (quarterfinals)

== Draw ==
Key

- Q = Qualifier
- WC = Wild card
- LL = Lucky loser
- Alt = Alternate
- ITF = ITF entry
- PR = Protected ranking
- SR = Special ranking
- SE = Special exempt
- JE = Junior exempt
- JR = Junior Accelerator Programme entrant
- CO = College Accelerator Programme entrant
- NG = Next Gen Accelerator Program entrant
- w/o = Walkover
- r = Retired
- d = Defaulted

=== Finals ===
Semifinals
(Canada) Philip Gubenco (Canada) Charles-Antoine Sévigny	2	6	2
3	(Austria) Jürgen Melzer (Denmark) Kristian Pless	6	4	6
4	(Italy) Francesco Aldi (Italy) Stefano Mocci	7	6	0
2	(Czech Republic) Ladislav Chramosta (Czech Republic) Michal Navrátil	6	7	6

Final
3	(Austria) Jürgen Melzer (Denmark) Kristian Pless	6	6	6
2	(Czech Republic) Ladislav Chramosta (Czech Republic) Michal Navrátil	7	3	0

=== Top half ===
First round
1	(United States) Bo Hodge (United States) Davis Martin	3	3
(Canada) Philip Gubenco (Canada) Charles-Antoine Sévigny	6	6
(France) Thierry Ascione (France) Jean-Christophe Faurel	6	7
(Canada) Chris Gostek (Australia) Sebastian Nawrocki	3	6
(Greece) Lefterios Alexiou (Greece) Alex Jakupovic	3	6	2
(Australia) Matthew Fitzgerald (New Zealand) Lee Radovanovich	6	1	6
(Sweden) Joachim Johansson (Finland) Jarkko Nieminen	6	6
5	(South Africa) Andrew McDade (South Africa) Dirk Stegmann	3	1
3	(Austria) Jürgen Melzer (Denmark) Kristian Pless	6	6
WC	(Australia) David Laverty (Australia) Nathan McGregor	2	3
(Denmark) Mik Ledvonova (Russia) Mikhail Youzhny	4	4
(South Africa) Evan Fowler (Belgium) Jeroen Masson	6	6
(Australia) Glen Bertram (Australia) Rameez Junaid	4	6	3
(Egypt) Mohamed Mamoun (South Africa) Peter-John Nomdo	6	1	6
(United States) Levar Harper-Griffith (United States) Timothy Martin	6	6
5	(Norway) Stian Boretti (Norway) Jørgen Vestli	2	2

Second round
(Canada) P Gubenco (Canada) C-A Sévigny	6	2	6
(France) T Ascione (France) J-C Faurel	2	6	3
(Australia) M Fitzgerald (New Zealand) L Radovanovich	7	6
(Sweden) J Johansson (Finland) J Nieminen	6	3
3	(Austria) J Melzer (Denmark) K Pless	6	6
(South Africa) E Fowler (Belgium) J Masson	4	2
(Egypt) M Mamoun (South Africa) P-J Nomdo	6	6
(United States) L Harper-Griffith (United States) T Martin	3	1

Quarterfinals
(Canada) P Gubenco (Canada) C-A Sévigny	1	6	6
(Australia) M Fitzgerald (New Zealand) L Radovanovich	6	3	2
3	(Austria) J Melzer (Denmark) K Pless	7	6
(Egypt) M Mamoun (South Africa) P-J Nomdo	6	3

Semifinals
(Canada) P Gubenco (Canada) C-A Sévigny	2	6	2
3	(Austria) J Melzer (Denmark) K Pless	6	4	6

=== Bottom half ===
First round
7	(Germany) Boris Bachert (Germany) Christian-Michael Straka	6	6
(Australia) Tyrell Diaz-Stevens (Hong Kong) Wong Wing-luen	2	4
WC	(Australia) Alex Bucewicz (Australia) Michael Staniak	6	4	5
(Australia) Simon Auteri (Australia) Tom George	4	6	7
WC	(Australia) Samuel Fletcher (Australia) Sadik Kadir	6	5	7
(Portugal) Gonçalo Figueiredo (Finland) Timo Nieminen	4	7	9
(United States) Mardy Fish (United States) Andy Roddick	6	3	3
4	(Italy) Francesco Aldi (Italy) Stefano Mocci	3	6	6
6	(United States) Simone Amorico (United States) Alex Bogomolov Jr.	6	2	2
(Germany) Maximilian Abel (Czech Republic) Jaroslav Levinský	0	6	6
(Australia) Domenic Marafiote (Australia) Daniel Wendler	7	6
(United Kingdom) Lee Childs (United Kingdom) Mark Hilton	6	1
(South Africa) Andrew Anderson (South Africa) Roger Anderson	6	4
WC	(Australia) Anthony Hampson (Australia) Marcin Losinski	7	6
(France) Julien Maes (France) Éric Prodon	6	3	3
2	(Czech Republic) Ladislav Chramosta (Czech Republic) Michal Navrátil	0	6	6

Second round
7	(Germany) B Bachert (Germany) C-M Straka	6	6
(Australia) S Auteri (Australia) T George	1	3
(Portugal) G Figueiredo (Finland) T Nieminen	3	6	3
4	(Italy) F Aldi (Italy) S Mocci	6	4	6
(Germany) M Abel (Czech Republic) J Levinský	6	6
(Australia) D Marafiote (Australia) D Wendler	4	3
WC	(Australia) A Hampson (Australia) M Losinski	6	3	2
2	(Czech Republic) L Chramosta (Czech Republic) M Navrátil	3	6	6

Quarterfinals
7	(Germany) B Bachert (Germany) C-M Straka	2	3
4	(Italy) F Aldi (Italy) S Mocci	6	6
(Germany) M Abel (Czech Republic) J Levinský
2	(Czech Republic) L Chramosta (Czech Republic) M Navrátil	w/o

Semifinals
4	(Italy) F Aldi (Italy) S Mocci	7	6	0
2	(Czech Republic) L Chramosta (Czech Republic) M Navrátil	6	7	6
