= Katarína Bašternáková =

Slovak tennis player

- Full name: Katarína Bašternáková
- Country (sports): Slovakia
- Born: 12 October 1982 (age 42); Hurbanovo, Czechoslovakia
- Prize money: $10,568

Singles
- Career record: 36–26
- Career titles: 0
- Highest ranking: 292 (21 May 2001)

Grand Slam singles results
- Australian Open Junior: F (1999)
- French Open Junior: 1R (1998, 1999)
- Wimbledon Junior: 1R (1998)
- US Open Junior: 3R (1998)

Doubles
- Career record: 18–15
- Career titles: 2 ITF
- Highest ranking: 441 (7 February 2000)

Grand Slam doubles results
- Australian Open Junior: QF (1999)
- French Open Junior: 2R (1998)
- Wimbledon Junior: SF (1998)
- US Open Junior: SF (1999)

Katarína Bašternáková
Medal record

Tennis

Representing Slovakia

Summer Universiade
Silver medal – second place	2003 Daegu	Doubles
Silver medal – second place	2005 İzmir	Doubles

Katarína Bašternáková (Slovak pronunciation: [ˈkatariːna ˈbaʂternaːkɔʋa]; born 12 October 1982) is a former Slovak tennis player. A native of Hurbanovo, she was runner-up at the 1999 Australian Open – Girls' singles tournament.

Bašternáková reached a career-high doubles ranking of world number 441 during her playing career in which she won two ITF doubles titles. Although she never won an ITF singles title, her world singles ranking peaked at number 292 in May 2001.

Together with Stanislava Hrozenská, Bašternáková won a silver medal in tennis doubles at the 2003 and 2005 Summer Universiade games.

== ITF finals (2–1) ==
=== Singles (0–1) ===
Legend $100,000 tournaments $75,000 tournaments $50,000 tournaments $25,000 tournaments $10,000 tournaments	Finals by surface Hard (0–0) Clay (0–1) Grass (0–0) Carpet (0–0)

Result	No.	Date	Category	Tournament	Surface	Opponent	Score
Runner-up	1.	5 February 2001	$10,000	Majorca, Spain	Clay	(Hungary) Eszter Molnár	3–6, 4–6

=== Doubles (2–0) ===
Legend $100,000 tournaments $75,000 tournaments $50,000 tournaments $25,000 tournaments $10,000 tournaments	Finals by surface Hard (0–0) Clay (2–0) Grass (0–0) Carpet (0–0)

Result	No.	Date	Category	Tournament	Surface	Partner	Opponents	Score
Winner	1.	14 June 1999	$10,000	Poznań, Poland	Clay	(Slovakia) Stanislava Hrozenská	(Slovakia) Eva Fislová (Slovakia) Gabriela Voleková	6–3, 7–5
Winner	2.	30 October 2000	$10,000	Cairo, Egypt	Clay	(Slovakia) Alena Paulenková	(Austria) Daniela Klemenschits (Japan) Ayako Suzuki	1–4, 5–4^{(5–3)}, 4–1, 4–0

== Grand Slam finals ==
=== Girls' singles ===
Outcome	Year	Championship	Surface	Opponent	Score
Runner-up	1999	Australian Open	Hard	(France) Virginie Razzano	1–6, 1–6
