= Óscar Serrano (tennis) =

Spanish tennis player

- Full name: Óscar Serrano Gámez
- Country (sports): Spain
- Residence: Sant Just Desvern, Spain
- Born: 25 May 1978 (age 46); Barcelona, Spain
- Height: 5 ft 8 in (173 cm)
- Turned pro: 1996
- Retired: 2005
- Plays: Right-handed (one-handed backhand)
- Prize money: $267,670

Singles
- Career record: 6–13
- Career titles: 0; 1 Challenger, 1 Futures
- Highest ranking: No. 128 (27 November 2000)

Grand Slam singles results
- Australian Open: 1R (1999)
- French Open: 1R (2000)
- Wimbledon: Q2 (2004)

Doubles
- Career record: 1–1
- Career titles: 0; 0 Challenger, 1 Futures
- Highest ranking: No. 375 (16 June 2003)
- Last updated on: 26 September 2021.

Óscar Serrano Gámez (born 25 May 1978) is a Spanish tennis coach and former player. As of 2023, he is the coach of Kaja Juvan.

Serrano retired in 2005, after playing a total of 19 matches during his ATP career. He became professional in 1996, and achieved his career-high ATP ranking on 27 November 2000, reaching No. 128 in the world.

== ATP Challenger and ITF Futures finals ==
=== Singles: 6 (2–4) ===
Legend ATP Challenger (1–4) ITF Futures (1–0)	Finals by surface Hard (0–0) Clay (2–4) Grass (0–0) Carpet (0–0)

Result	W–L	Date	Tournament	Tier	Surface	Opponent	Score
Loss	0–1	Jul 2000	Montauban, France	Challenger	Clay	(France) Jean-Rene Lisnard	2–6, 0–6
Loss	0–2	Sep 2000	Seville, Spain	Challenger	Clay	(Spain) Tommy Robredo	7–6^{(7–4)}, 1–6, 4–6
Loss	0–3	Oct 2000	Barcelona, Spain	Challenger	Clay	(Spain) Albert Portas	6–3, 4–6, 3–6
Loss	0–4	Jul 2002	Montauban, France	Challenger	Clay	(France) Richard Gasquet	5–7, 1–6
Win	1–4	Jan 2003	France F2, Angers	Futures	Clay	(France) Xavier Pujo	7–5, 5–7, 6–4
Win	2–4	Jun 2003	Turin, Italy	Challenger	Clay	(Spain) Juan Albert Viloca	6–2, 6–2

=== Doubles: 2 (1–1) ===
Legend ATP Challenger (0–1) ITF Futures (1–0)	Finals by surface Hard (0–0) Clay (1–1) Grass (0–0) Carpet (0–0)

Result	W–L	Date	Tournament	Tier	Surface	Partner	Opponents	Score
Win	1–0	Jan 2003	France F3, Deauville	Futures	Clay	(Spain) Oscar Hernandez Perez	(China) Zeng Shaoxuan (China) Xu Ran	6–2, 6–1
Loss	1–1	Jul 2005	Mantova, Italy	Challenger	Clay	(Spain) Salvador Navarro-Gutierrez	(Italy) Alessandro Motti (Italy) Flavio Cipolla	7–5, 3–6, 3–6

== Performance timeline ==
Key
W	F	SF	QF	#R	RR	Q#	DNQ	A	NH

(W) winner; (F) finalist; (SF) semifinalist; (QF) quarterfinalist; (#R) rounds 4, 3, 2, 1; (RR) round-robin stage; (Q#) qualification round; (DNQ) did not qualify; (A) absent; (NH) not held; (SR) strike rate (events won / competed); (W–L) win–loss record.

=== Singles ===
Tournament	1999	2000	2001	2002	2003	2004	SR	W–L	Win %
Grand Slam tournaments
Australian Open	1R	A	A	A	A	Q1	0 / 1	0–1	0%
French Open	Q2	1R	Q2	Q2	Q2	Q1	0 / 1	0–1	0%
Wimbledon	A	A	A	A	Q1	Q2	0 / 0	0–0	–
US Open	A	A	A	A	A	A	0 / 0	0–0	–
Win–loss	0–1	0–1	0–0	0–0	0–0	0–0	0 / 2	0–2	0%
