= Nicole Buckley =

Canadian biologist

Nicole Buckley (born 1960) is a Canadian biologist. Buckley was the Chief Scientist for Life Sciences and ISS Utilization at the Canadian Space Agency. Appointed to the role in 2009, she worked to highlight the benefits of space science for all, particularly in regard to research on ageing in space. Her current position is Team Leader for the SciSpacE team at the European Space Agency (ESA).

Buckley studied Microbiology at the University of Saskatchewan, where she received her bachelor's and master's degree. She received her PhD in Oral Biology from the University of Manitoba.
