= 1999 Australian Open – Girls' doubles =

Girls' doubles
- 1999 Australian Open

Final
- Champions: (Greece) Eleni Daniilidou (France) Virginie Razzano
- Runners-up: (South Africa) Natalie Grandin (South Africa) Nicole Rencken
- Score: 6–1, 6–1

Events
Singles	men	women		boys	girls
Doubles	men	women	mixed	boys	girls
WC Singles	men	women	quad
WC Doubles	men	women	quad
Legends	men	women	mixed
- Australian Open

Evie Dominikovic and Alicia Molik were the defending champions, but they did not compete in the Junior's this year.

The unseeded pair of Eleni Daniilidou and Virginie Razzano won in the final 6–1, 6–1, against South Africans Natalie Grandin and Nicole Rencken.

== Seeds ==
1. (United States) Ansley Cargill / (United States) Lindsay Dawaf (second round)
2. (Czech Republic) Dája Bedáňová / (South Africa) Aniela Mojzis (semifinals)
3. (Slovakia) Katarína Bašternáková / (Slovakia) Zuzana Kučová (quarterfinals)
4. (Czech Republic) Dominika Luzarová / (Czech Republic) Iveta Benešová (first round)
5. (South Africa) Natalie Grandin / (South Africa) Nicole Rencken (final)
6. (United States) Laura Granville / (United States) Julia Scaringe (first round)
7. (Canada) Kavitha Krishnamurthy / (Hungary) Kinga Berecz (first round)
8. (France) Melinda Malouli / (France) Stéphanie Cohen-Aloro (first round)

== Draw ==
Key

- Q = Qualifier
- WC = Wild card
- LL = Lucky loser
- Alt = Alternate
- ITF = ITF entry
- PR = Protected ranking
- SR = Special ranking
- SE = Special exempt
- JE = Junior exempt
- JR = Junior Accelerator Programme entrant
- CO = College Accelerator Programme entrant
- NG = Next Gen Accelerator Program entrant
- w/o = Walkover
- r = Retired
- d = Defaulted

=== Finals ===
Semifinals
(Greece) Eleni Daniilidou (France) Virginie Razzano	3	6	6
(Australia) Melanie-Ann Clayton (Australia) Nicole Sewell	6	3	4
5	(South Africa) Natalie Grandin (South Africa) Nicole Rencken	6	4	6
2	(Czech Republic) Dája Bedáňová (South Africa) Aniela Mojzis	4	6	4

Final
(Greece) Eleni Daniilidou (France) Virginie Razzano	6	6
5	(South Africa) Natalie Grandin (South Africa) Nicole Rencken	1	1

=== Top half ===
First round
1	(United States) A Cargill (United States) L Dawaf	6	6
(South Africa) A de Bruyn (South Africa) N Van Der Merwe	0	1
WC	(Italy) F Pennetta (Italy) R Vinci	1	3
(Greece) E Daniilidou (France) V Razzano	6	6
WC	(Australia) N Kriz (Australia) D McIntyre	1	4
(New Zealand) L Baker (Australia) C Wheeler	6	6
WC	(Australia) K Browne (Australia) C Horiatopoulos	6	6
7	(Canada) K Krishnamurthy (Hungary) K Berecz	3	0
4	(Czech Republic) D Luzarová (Czech Republic) I Benešová	3	2
(Indonesia) W Prakusya (Indonesia) A Widjaja	6	6
(Canada) N Bogdanovich (Japan) R Uda	6	6
WC	(Australia) K Pinchbeck (Australia) B Sekulovski	2	2
(Hungary) A Kapros (Hungary) G Zsíros	6	2
(Italy) ME Camerin (Greece) A Kaplani	7	6
(Australia) M-A Clayton (Australia) N Sewell	6	2	10
8	(France) M Malouli (France) S Cohen-Aloro	3	6	8

Second round
1	(United States) A Cargill (United States) L Dawaf	6	1	0
(Greece) E Daniilidou (France) V Razzano	4	6	6
(New Zealand) L Baker (Australia) C Wheeler	7	6
WC	(Australia) K Browne (Australia) C Horiatopoulos	6	2
(Indonesia) W Prakusya (Indonesia) A Widjaja	6	6
(Canada) N Bogdanovich (Japan) R Uda	3	0
(Italy) ME Camerin (Greece) A Kaplani	6	3	4
(Australia) M-A Clayton (Australia) N Sewell	3	6	6

Quarterfinals
(Greece) E Daniilidou (France) V Razzano	6	6
(New Zealand) L Baker (Australia) C Wheeler	0	2
(Indonesia) W Prakusya (Indonesia) A Widjaja	3	2
(Australia) M-A Clayton (Australia) N Sewell	6	6

Semifinals
(Greece) E Daniilidou (France) V Razzano	3	6	6
(Australia) M-A Clayton (Australia) N Sewell	6	3	4

=== Bottom half ===
First round
5	(South Africa) N Grandin (South Africa) N Rencken	6	6
(Australia) J Belobrajdic (Australia) J Hewitt	4	4
(Australia) E Gott (Australia) R Rosenfield	6	6
(Netherlands) M Gerards (Norway) C Tidemand	4	3
(Serbia and Montenegro) D Milošević (Slovakia) L Tvarosková	6	4	2
(Australia) A Cowan (Australia) L D'Amelio	4	6	6
(Australia) N Buckley (Slovenia) T Hergold	7	5	1
3	(Slovakia) K Bašternáková (Slovakia) Z Kučová	5	7	6
6	(United States) L Granville (United States) J Scaringe	6	3	4
(Canada) M-È Pelletier (France) O Sanchez	1	6	6
(Australia) M Adamczak (Australia) S Stone	6	6
(Australia) S Stosur (Australia) T Welford	1	0
(Australia) E Haylock (Australia) B Kelly	6	6
(Thailand) P Laosirichon (Thailand) S Viratprasert	3	1
(Japan) K Aoyama (Japan) K Iljima	6	4	1
2	(Czech Republic) D Bedáňová (South Africa) A Mojzis	4	6	6

Second round
5	(South Africa) N Grandin (South Africa) N Rencken	6	7
(Australia) E Gott (Australia) R Rosenfield	1	6
(Australia) A Cowan (Australia) L D'Amelio	7	3	1
3	(Slovakia) K Bašternáková (Slovakia) Z Kučová	6	6	6
(Canada) M-È Pelletier (France) O Sanchez	6	2	4
(Australia) M Adamczak (Australia) S Stone	3	6	6
(Australia) E Haylock (Australia) B Kelly	2	2
2	(Czech Republic) D Bedáňová (South Africa) A Mojzis	6	6

Quarterfinals
5	(South Africa) N Grandin (South Africa) N Rencken	6	6
3	(Slovakia) K Bašternáková (Slovakia) Z Kučová	4	2
(Australia) M Adamczak (Australia) S Stone	0	6	4
2	(Czech Republic) D Bedáňová (South Africa) A Mojzis	6	3	6

Semifinals
5	(South Africa) N Grandin (South Africa) N Rencken	6	4	6
2	(Czech Republic) D Bedáňová (South Africa) A Mojzis	4	6	4
