= 1999 Australian Open – Women's doubles =

Women's doubles
- 1999 Australian Open

Final
- Champions: (Switzerland) Martina Hingis (Russia) Anna Kournikova
- Runners-up: (United States) Lindsay Davenport (Belarus) Natasha Zvereva
- Score: 7–5, 6–3

Details
- Draw: 64
- Seeds: 16

Events
Singles	men	women		boys	girls
Doubles	men	women	mixed	boys	girls
WC Singles	men	women	quad
WC Doubles	men	women	quad
Legends	men	women	mixed
- Australian Open

Two-time defending champion Martina Hingis and her partner Anna Kournikova defeated Lindsay Davenport and Natasha Zvereva in the final, 7–5, 6–3 to win the women's doubles tennis title at the 1999 Australian Open. It was Hingis' fifth consecutive major doubles title, and she became the only woman to win three consecutive Australian Open titles in singles and doubles simultaneously. Hingis and her partners defeated Davenport and Zvereva for all five consecutive women's doubles titles, starting with the 1998 Australian Open. It was Davenport's fourth consecutive runner-up finish in the Australian Open women's doubles event. This was also Zvereva's tenth consecutive women's doubles major final, with three different partners (Gigi Fernández, Hingis, and Davenport).

Hingis and Mirjana Lučić were the defending champions, but chose not to play together. Lučić competed with Mary Pierce, but lost in the first round to Christina Singer and Helena Vildová.

== Seeds ==
1. (United States) Lindsay Davenport / (Belarus) Natasha Zvereva (final)
2. (United States) Lisa Raymond / (Australia) Rennae Stubbs (semifinals)
3. (Switzerland) Martina Hingis / (Russia) Anna Kournikova (champions)
4. (Latvia) Larisa Neiland / (Spain) Arantxa Sánchez Vicario (quarterfinals)
5. (Russia) Elena Likhovtseva / (Japan) Ai Sugiyama (second round)
6. (Spain) Conchita Martínez / (Argentina) Patricia Tarabini (first round)
7. (South Africa) Mariaan de Swardt / (Ukraine) Elena Tatarkova (third round)
8. (Romania) Irina Spîrlea / (Netherlands) Caroline Vis (second round)
9. (Spain) Virginia Ruano Pascual / (Argentina) Paola Suárez (second round)
10. (Austria) Barbara Schett / (Switzerland) Patty Schnyder (third round)
11. (United States) Katrina Adams / (United States) Debbie Graham (first round)
12. (Czech Republic) Jana Novotná / (United States) Monica Seles (third round)
13. (Australia) Rachel McQuillan / (Japan) Nana Miyagi (first round)
14. (Belgium) Els Callens / (France) Julie Halard-Decugis (third round)
15. (Belgium) Sabine Appelmans / (Netherlands) Miriam Oremans (third round)
16. (Croatia) Mirjana Lučić / (France) Mary Pierce (first round)

== Draw ==
Key

- Q = Qualifier
- WC = Wild card
- LL = Lucky loser
- Alt = Alternate
- ITF = ITF entry
- PR = Protected ranking
- SR = Special ranking
- SE = Special exempt
- JE = Junior exempt
- JR = Junior Accelerator Programme entrant
- CO = College Accelerator Programme entrant
- NG = Next Gen Accelerator Program entrant
- w/o = Walkover
- r = Retired
- d = Defaulted

=== Finals ===
Quarterfinals
1	(United States) Lindsay Davenport (Belarus) Natasha Zvereva	6	6
(Indonesia) Yayuk Basuki (France) Amélie Mauresmo	2	3
4	(Latvia) Larisa Neiland (Spain) Arantxa Sánchez Vicario	4	6	1
(United States) Serena Williams (United States) Venus Williams	6	4	6
(United States) Nicole Arendt (Netherlands) Manon Bollegraf	6^{0}	2
3	(Switzerland) Martina Hingis (Russia) Anna Kournikova	7^{7}	6
(Argentina) Florencia Labat (Belgium) Dominique Van Roost	1	4
2	(United States) Lisa Raymond (Australia) Rennae Stubbs	6	6

Semifinals
1	(United States) Lindsay Davenport (Belarus) Natasha Zvereva	1	6	6
(United States) Serena Williams (United States) Venus Williams	6	4	4
3	(Switzerland) Martina Hingis (Russia) Anna Kournikova	6	5	6
2	(United States) Lisa Raymond (Australia) Rennae Stubbs	3	7	4

Final
1	(United States) Lindsay Davenport (Belarus) Natasha Zvereva	5	3
3	(Switzerland) Martina Hingis (Russia) Anna Kournikova	7	6

=== Top half ===
==== Section 1 ====
First round
1	(United States) L Davenport (Belarus) N Zvereva	6	6
(United States) A Frazier (United States) K Schlukebir	2	1
(Australia) K Kunce (United States) K Po	7	6
(Canada) M Drake (Australia) T Musgrave	5	3
(Germany) A Huber (United States) L Wild	6	1	3
(Romania) C Cristea (Romania) R Dragomir	2	6	6
(Argentina) I Gorrochategui (Germany) S Graf	6	4	8
11	(United States) K Adams (United States) D Graham	2	6	6
13	(Australia) R McQuillan (Japan) N Miyagi	2	6^{5}
(Indonesia) Y Basuki (France) A Mauresmo	6	7^{7}
(Spain) E Bes (Bulgaria) S Krivencheva	6^{3}	5
(Japan) R Hiraki (Australia) L McShea	7^{7}	7
(Poland) A Olsza (France) N van Lottum	6	6
(Netherlands) A Hopmans (Australia) L Pleming	2	4
WC	(Sweden) Å Carlsson (Australia) J Dokić	1	6	6
6	(Spain) C Martínez (Argentina) P Tarabini	6	3	0

Second round
1	(United States) L Davenport (Belarus) N Zvereva	7^{7}	6
(Australia) K Kunce (United States) K Po	6^{3}	0
(Romania) C Cristea (Romania) R Dragomir	6	3	6
(Argentina) I Gorrochategui (Germany) S Graf	4	6	3
(Indonesia) Y Basuki (France) A Mauresmo	6	7^{10}
(Japan) R Hiraki (Australia) L McShea	1	6^{8}
(Poland) A Olsza (France) N van Lottum	5	3
WC	(Sweden) Å Carlsson (Australia) J Dokić	7	6

Third round
1	(United States) L Davenport (Belarus) N Zvereva	6	6
(Romania) C Cristea (Romania) R Dragomir	0	3
(Indonesia) Y Basuki (France) A Mauresmo	6	6
WC	(Sweden) Å Carlsson (Australia) J Dokić	2	0

Quarterfinals
1	(United States) L Davenport (Belarus) N Zvereva	6	6
(Indonesia) Y Basuki (France) A Mauresmo	2	3

==== Section 2 ====
First round
4	(Latvia) L Neiland (Spain) A Sánchez Vicario	6	6
WC	(Australia) E Dominikovic (Australia) C Watson	3	4
(United States) E deLone (United States) N Pratt	3	3
(France) A Dechaume-Balleret (Italy) L Golarsa	6	6
(Czech Republic) K Hrdličková (Slovenia) T Križan	6	6
(Italy) R Grande (Germany) E Wagner	4	3
(South Africa) S de Beer (Chinese Taipei) J Lee	4	4
9	(Spain) V Ruano Pascual (Argentina) P Suárez	6	6
16	(Croatia) M Lučić (France) M Pierce	2	2
(Germany) C Singer (Czech Republic) H Vildová	6	6
(United States) S Williams (United States) V Williams	6	6
(Australia) C Barclay (Australia) K-A Guse	4	1
(Australia) A Ellwood (Australia) A Molik	1	2
(United States) M J Fernández (United States) C Morariu	6	6
(Greece) C Papadáki (Italy) G Pizzichini	5	4
7	(South Africa) M de Swardt (Ukraine) E Tatarkova	7	6

Second round
4	(Latvia) L Neiland (Spain) A Sánchez Vicario	6	6
(France) A Dechaume-Balleret (Italy) L Golarsa	3	3
(Czech Republic) K Hrdličková (Slovenia) T Križan	3	6	6
9	(Spain) V Ruano Pascual (Argentina) P Suárez	6	2	2
(Germany) C Singer (Czech Republic) H Vildová	3	1
(United States) S Williams (United States) V Williams	6	6
(United States) M J Fernández (United States) C Morariu	0	3
7	(South Africa) M de Swardt (Ukraine) E Tatarkova	6	6

Third round
4	(Latvia) L Neiland (Spain) A Sánchez Vicario	6^{4}	7	6
(Czech Republic) K Hrdličková (Slovenia) T Križan	7^{7}	5	1
(United States) S Williams (United States) V Williams	7^{7}	6
7	(South Africa) M de Swardt (Ukraine) E Tatarkova	6^{3}	2

Quarterfinals
4	(Latvia) L Neiland (Spain) A Sánchez Vicario	4	6	1
(United States) S Williams (United States) V Williams	6	4	6

=== Bottom half ===
==== Section 3 ====
First round
8	(Romania) I Spîrlea (Netherlands) C Vis	6	6
(Hungary) V Csurgó (South Korea) E-h Kim	1	2
(United States) N Arendt (Netherlands) M Bollegraf	7^{7}	6
(Zimbabwe) C Black (Kazakhstan) I Selyutina	5	3
(South Africa) A Coetzer (South Africa) J Steck	4	6	6
(United States) C Rubin (France) S Testud	6	2	3
(Japan) M Saeki (Japan) Y Yoshida	4	4
15	(Belgium) S Appelmans (United States) M Oremans	6	6
12	(Czech Republic) J Novotná (United States) M Seles	6	7^{7}
(South Africa) L Horn (Austria) K Kschwendt	2	6^{5}
(Belgium) L Courtois (South Africa) E de Villiers	7^{7}	6
(South Korea) Cho Y-j (South Korea) Park S-h	6^{4}	3
(Netherlands) S Noorlander (Chinese Taipei) S-t Wang	7	6
(Spain) A Ortuño (Spain) M Ramón Climent	5	3
(Czech Republic) E Melicharová (United Kingdom) J Pullin	3	0
3	(Switzerland) M Hingis (Russia) A Kournikova	6	6

Second round
8	(Romania) I Spîrlea (Netherlands) C Vis	5	5
(United States) N Arendt (Netherlands) M Bollegraf	7	7
(South Africa) A Coetzer (South Africa) J Steck	4	6^{2}
15	(Belgium) S Appelmans (United States) M Oremans	6	7^{7}
12	(Czech Republic) J Novotná (United States) M Seles	6	6
(Belgium) L Courtois (South Africa) E de Villiers	2	3
(Netherlands) S Noorlander (Chinese Taipei) S-t Wang	1	5
3	(Switzerland) M Hingis (Russia) A Kournikova	6	7

Third round
(United States) N Arendt (Netherlands) M Bollegraf	6	6
15	(Belgium) S Appelmans (United States) M Oremans	2	3
12	(Czech Republic) J Novotná (United States) M Seles	6^{9}	3
3	(Switzerland) M Hingis (Russia) A Kournikova	7^{11}	6

Quarterfinals
(United States) N Arendt (Netherlands) M Bollegraf	6^{0}	2
3	(Switzerland) M Hingis (Russia) A Kournikova	7^{7}	6

==== Section 4 ====
First round
5	(Russia) E Likhovtseva (Japan) A Sugiyama	6	6
(United States) L Lee (Bulgaria) P Stoyanova	3	3
(United States) L Osterloh (United States) M Washington	5	6	2
(Argentina) F Labat (Belgium) D Van Roost	7	3	6
(Italy) A Canepa (Italy) T Garbin	1	1
(Italy) S Farina (Slovakia) K Habšudová	6	6
(United States) S Reeves (Thailand) T Tanasugarn	2	7^{7}	3
14	(Belgium) E Callens (France) J Halard-Decugis	6	6^{4}	6
10	(Austria) B Schett (Switzerland) P Schnyder	7	4	6
(France) C Dhenin (France) É Loit	5	6	3
(Netherlands) K Boogert (France) A-G Sidot	6	6^{5}	6
WC	(United States) M Tu (Germany) M Weingärtner	2	7^{7}	2
(Czech Republic) R Bobková (Australia) D Jones	6	6
WC	(Australia) A Grahame (Australia) B Stewart	2	4
(United States) S Cacic (Canada) S Jeyaseelan	5	1
2	(United States) L Raymond (Australia) R Stubbs	7	6

Second round
5	(Russia) E Likhovtseva (Japan) A Sugiyama	4	6	1
(Argentina) F Labat (Belgium) D Van Roost	6	2	6
(Italy) S Farina (Slovakia) K Habšudová	5	3
14	(Belgium) E Callens (France) J Halard-Decugis	7	6
10	(Austria) B Schett (Switzerland) P Schnyder	7^{7}	2	8
(Netherlands) K Boogert (France) A-G Sidot	6^{3}	6	6
WC	(Australia) A Grahame (Australia) B Stewart	0	3
2	(United States) L Raymond (Australia) R Stubbs	6	6

Third round
(Argentina) F Labat (Belgium) D Van Roost	6	6
14	(Belgium) E Callens (France) J Halard-Decugis	4	1
10	(Austria) B Schett (Switzerland) P Schnyder	0	7	3
2	(United States) L Raymond (Australia) R Stubbs	6	5	6

Quarterfinals
(Argentina) F Labat (Belgium) D Van Roost	1	4
2	(United States) L Raymond (Australia) R Stubbs	6	6
