= 1999 Australian Open – Men's doubles =

Tennis tournament

Men's doubles
- 1999 Australian Open

Final
- Champions: (Sweden) Jonas Björkman (Australia) Patrick Rafter
- Runners-up: (India) Mahesh Bhupathi (India) Leander Paes
- Score: 6–3, 4–6, 6–4, 6–7^{(10–12)}, 6–4

Details
- Draw: 64
- Seeds: 16

Events
Singles	men	women		boys	girls
Doubles	men	women	mixed	boys	girls
WC Singles	men	women	quad
WC Doubles	men	women	quad
Legends	men	women	mixed
- Australian Open

Defending champion Jonas Björkman and his partner Patrick Rafter defeated Mahesh Bhupathi and Leander Paes in the final, 6–3, 4–6, 6–4, 6–7^{(10–12)}, 6–4 to win the men's doubles tennis title at the 1999 Australian Open. It was Rafter's first and only major doubles title, and Björkman's second.

Björkman and Jacco Eltingh were the reigning champions, but Eltingh did not compete this year.

== Seeds ==
1. (India) Mahesh Bhupathi / (India) Leander Paes (final)
2. (Australia) Todd Woodbridge / (Australia) Mark Woodforde (semifinals)
3. (The Bahamas) Mark Knowles / (Canada) Daniel Nestor (second round)
4. (South Africa) Ellis Ferreira / (United States) Rick Leach (semifinals)
5. (Sweden) Jonas Björkman / (Australia) Patrick Rafter (champions)
6. (United States) Patrick Galbraith / (Netherlands) Paul Haarhuis (quarterfinals)
7. (France) Olivier Delaître / (France) Fabrice Santoro (third round)
8. (Canada) Sébastien Lareau / (United States) Alex O'Brien (first round)
9. (Czech Republic) Martin Damm / (Czech Republic) Cyril Suk (first round)
10. (Russia) Yevgeny Kafelnikov / (Czech Republic) Daniel Vacek (quarterfinals)
11. (Australia) Joshua Eagle / (United States) Jim Grabb (first round)
12. (United States) Donald Johnson / (United States) Francisco Montana (first round)
13. (South Africa) Pieter Norval / (South Africa) Kevin Ullyett (first round)
14. (Australia) Andrew Florent / (Australia) David Macpherson (second round)
15. (Zimbabwe) Wayne Black / (Australia) Sandon Stolle (third round)
16. (South Africa) David Adams / (South Africa) John-Laffnie de Jager (third round)

== Draw ==
Key

- Q = Qualifier
- WC = Wild card
- LL = Lucky loser
- Alt = Alternate
- ITF = ITF entry
- PR = Protected ranking
- SR = Special ranking
- SE = Special exempt
- JE = Junior exempt
- JR = Junior Accelerator Programme entrant
- CO = College Accelerator Programme entrant
- NG = Next Gen Accelerator Program entrant
- w/o = Walkover
- r = Retired
- d = Defaulted

=== Finals ===
Quarterfinals
1	(India) Mahesh Bhupathi (India) Leander Paes	6	7^{7}	6
(United States) Richey Reneberg (United States) Jonathan Stark	4	6^{5}	3
4	(South Africa) Ellis Ferreira (United States) Rick Leach	7	6	6
6	(United States) Patrick Galbraith (Netherlands) Paul Haarhuis	5	2	4
5	(Sweden) Jonas Björkman (Australia) Patrick Rafter	w/o
(Brazil) Gustavo Kuerten (Ecuador) Nicolás Lapentti
10	(Russia) Yevgeny Kafelnikov (Czech Republic) Daniel Vacek	6^{3}	3	1
2	(Australia) Todd Woodbridge (Australia) Mark Woodforde	7^{7}	6	6

Semifinals
1	(India) Mahesh Bhupathi (India) Leander Paes	7^{7}	6	7^{7}
4	(South Africa) Ellis Ferreira (United States) Rick Leach	6^{1}	3	6^{5}
5	(Sweden) Jonas Björkman (Australia) Patrick Rafter	3	4	6	6	8
2	(Australia) Todd Woodbridge (Australia) Mark Woodforde	6	6	2	2	6

Final
1	(India) Mahesh Bhupathi (India) Leander Paes	3	6	4	7^{12}	4
5	(Sweden) Jonas Björkman (Australia) Patrick Rafter	6	4	6	6^{10}	6

=== Top half ===
==== Section 1 ====
First round
1	(India) M Bhupathi (India) L Paes	6	6
(Netherlands) E Kempes (Netherlands) P Wessels	4	2
(Spain) F Roig (Spain) J Sánchez	4	6^{6}
(United States) D Flach (The Bahamas) M Merklein	6	7^{8}
(United States) J Palmer (United States) J Tarango	6	6
(Australia) J Holmes (Australia) T Larkham	3	3
(Czech Republic) S Doseděl (South Africa) B Talbot	3	4
16	(South Africa) D Adams (South Africa) J-L de Jager	6	6
9	(Czech Republic) M Damm (Czech Republic) C Suk	2	5
(United States) R Reneberg (United States) J Stark	6	7
(Netherlands) M Oosting (Italy) L Tieleman	6	2	2
(South Africa) L Bale (Australia) A Kratzmann	4	6	6
(Brazil) F Meligeni (Brazil) A Sá	3	2
(Australia) W Arthurs (Australia) P Tramacchi	6	6
(United Kingdom) N Broad (United Kingdom) A Richardson	7^{7}	3	3
7	(France) O Delaître (France) F Santoro	6^{3}	6	6

Second round
1	(India) M Bhupathi (India) L Paes	4	6	8
(United States) D Flach (The Bahamas) M Merklein	6	4	6
(United States) J Palmer (United States) J Tarango	5	2
16	(South Africa) D Adams (South Africa) J-L de Jager	7	6
(United States) R Reneberg (United States) J Stark	6	6
(South Africa) L Bale (Australia) A Kratzmann	2	3
(Australia) W Arthurs (Australia) P Tramacchi	6^{3}	3
7	(France) O Delaître (France) F Santoro	7^{7}	6

Third round
1	(India) M Bhupathi (India) L Paes	6	7^{7}
16	(South Africa) D Adams (South Africa) J-L de Jager	4	6^{4}
(United States) R Reneberg (United States) J Stark	6	6
7	(France) O Delaître (France) F Santoro	3	4

Quarterfinals
1	(India) M Bhupathi (India) L Paes	6	7^{7}	6
(United States) R Reneberg (United States) J Stark	4	6^{5}	3

==== Section 2 ====
First round
4	(South Africa) E Ferreira (United States) R Leach	6	6
(Czech Republic) T Anzari (Spain) A Martín	3	4
(South Africa) B Haygarth (United States) TJ Middleton	6	6^{5}	15
(Argentina) D del Río (Argentina) M Puerta	4	7^{7}	13
(Spain) J Alonso (Spain) JM Balcells	6	6
(Mexico) D Roditi (Australia) M Tebbutt	3	3
(Italy) M Ardinghi (Spain) Á López Morón	3	4
14	(Australia) A Florent (Australia) D Macpherson	6	6
11	(Australia) J Eagle (United States) J Grabb	3	6	1
(Belarus) M Mirnyi (Russia) A Olhovskiy	6	3	6
(Netherlands) T Kempers (Netherlands) J Siemerink	6^{7}	6	11
(Hungary) G Köves (Hungary) A Sávolt	7^{9}	2	9
(Zimbabwe) B Black (South Africa) W Ferreira	7	6
(United States) M Keil (Germany) J Knippschild	5	1
(Australia) P Kilderry (United States) K Kinnear	1	3
6	(United States) P Galbraith (Netherlands) P Haarhuis	6	6

Second round
4	(South Africa) E Ferreira (United States) R Leach	6	6
(South Africa) B Haygarth (United States) TJ Middleton	3	4
(Mexico) D Roditi (Australia) M Tebbutt	6	6
14	(Australia) A Florent (Australia) D Macpherson	2	2
(Belarus) M Mirnyi (Russia) A Olhovskiy	6	6
(Netherlands) T Kempers (Netherlands) J Siemerink	2	3
(Zimbabwe) B Black (South Africa) W Ferreira	2	4
6	(United States) P Galbraith (Netherlands) P Haarhuis	6	6

Third round
4	(South Africa) E Ferreira (United States) R Leach	6	3	6
(Mexico) D Roditi (Australia) M Tebbutt	2	6	3
(Belarus) M Mirnyi (Russia) A Olhovskiy	4	4
6	(United States) P Galbraith (Netherlands) P Haarhuis	6	6

Quarterfinals
4	(South Africa) E Ferreira (United States) R Leach	7	6	6
6	(United States) P Galbraith (Netherlands) P Haarhuis	5	2	4

=== Bottom half ===
==== Section 3 ====
First round
5	(Sweden) J Björkman (Australia) P Rafter	6	6
(South Africa) N Godwin (South Africa) M Ondruska	2	2
(Germany) M-K Goellner (Germany) D Prinosil	4	7	6
(Argentina) P Albano (Argentina) D Orsanic	6	5	3
WC	(Australia) P Hanley (Australia) N Healey	3	6^{1}
(United States) E Taino (United States) J Waite	6	7^{7}
WC	(Australia) G Doyle (Australia) B Ellwood	7	6
12	(United States) D Johnson (United States) F Montana	5	3
13	(South Africa) P Norval (South Africa) K Ullyett	4	6	6
(Brazil) G Kuerten (Ecuador) N Lapentti	6	2	8
WC	(Australia) D Petrovic (Australia) G Silcock	6^{4}	6	6
(Italy) M Bertolini (United States) D Bowen	7^{7}	2	3
(United States) J Gimelstob (United States) B MacPhie	4	5
(Sweden) N Kulti (Sweden) M Tillström	6	7
(United States) D DiLucia (United States) M Sell	5	4
3	(The Bahamas) M Knowles (Canada) D Nestor	7	6

Second round
5	(Sweden) J Björkman (Australia) P Rafter	6	6
(Germany) M-K Goellner (Germany) D Prinosil	2	4
(United States) E Taino (United States) J Waite	2	4
WC	(Australia) G Doyle (Australia) B Ellwood	6	6
(Brazil) G Kuerten (Ecuador) N Lapentti	7^{7}	6
WC	(Australia) D Petrovic (Australia) G Silcock	6^{1}	4
(Sweden) N Kulti (Sweden) M Tillström	6	5	6
3	(The Bahamas) M Knowles (Canada) D Nestor	4	7	4

Third round
5	(Sweden) J Björkman (Australia) P Rafter	6	6
WC	(Australia) G Doyle (Australia) B Ellwood	1	4
(Brazil) G Kuerten (Ecuador) N Lapentti	3	7^{7}	6
(Sweden) N Kulti (Sweden) M Tillström	6	6^{3}	4

Quarterfinals
5	(Sweden) J Björkman (Australia) P Rafter	w/o
(Brazil) G Kuerten (Ecuador) N Lapentti

==== Section 4 ====
First round
8	(Canada) S Lareau (United States) A O'Brien	4	4
(Argentina) L Arnold Ker (Czech Republic) P Vízner	6	6
(South Africa) M Barnard (South Africa) P Rosner	6	2	3
(North Macedonia) A Kitinov (Germany) M Kohlmann	3	6	6
(United States) B Coupe (United States) G Grant	1	6	4
(Czech Republic) J Novák (Czech Republic) D Rikl	6	4	6
(South Africa) J Coetzee (Netherlands) S Groen	4	6	3
10	(Russia) Y Kafelnikov (Czech Republic) D Vacek	6	2	6
15	(Zimbabwe) W Black (Australia) S Stolle	7^{7}	7^{7}
WC	(Australia) T Mitchell (Australia) A Painter	6^{5}	6^{3}
(South Africa) C Haggard (Sweden) P Nyborg	6	6
(Federal Republic of Yugoslavia) N Djordjević (Czech Republic) L Pimek	3	3
(Argentina) M Hood (Argentina) S Prieto	5	6	2
WC	(Australia) S Draper (Australia) L Hewitt	7	2	6
(Romania) D-M Pescariu (Federal Republic of Yugoslavia) N Zimonjić	6	3	7
2	(Australia) T Woodbridge (Australia) M Woodforde	3	6	9

Second round
(Argentina) L Arnold Ker (Czech Republic) P Vízner	6	6
(North Macedonia) A Kitinov (Germany) M Kohlmann	2	2
(Czech Republic) J Novák (Czech Republic) D Rikl	3	7^{7}	7
10	(Russia) Y Kafelnikov (Czech Republic) D Vacek	6	6^{0}	9
15	(Zimbabwe) W Black (Australia) S Stolle	6	6
(South Africa) C Haggard (Sweden) P Nyborg	3	3
WC	(Australia) S Draper (Australia) L Hewitt	2	4
2	(Australia) T Woodbridge (Australia) M Woodforde	6	6

Third round
(Argentina) L Arnold Ker (Czech Republic) P Vízner	3	6	4
10	(Russia) Y Kafelnikov (Czech Republic) D Vacek	6	3	6
15	(Zimbabwe) W Black (Australia) S Stolle	5	0
2	(Australia) T Woodbridge (Australia) M Woodforde	7	6

Quarterfinals
10	(Russia) Y Kafelnikov (Czech Republic) D Vacek	6^{3}	3	1
2	(Australia) T Woodbridge (Australia) M Woodforde	7^{7}	6	6
