= Kristian Pless =

Danish tennis player

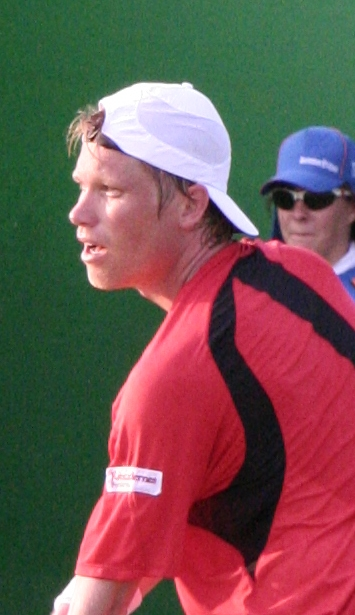
- Country (sports): Denmark
- Residence: Dubai, United Arab Emirates
- Born: 9 February 1981 (age 44); Odense, Denmark
- Height: 1.88 m (6 ft 2 in)
- Turned pro: 1999
- Retired: 2009
- Plays: Right-handed (two-handed backhand)
- Prize money: $1,127,884

Singles
- Career record: 55–86 (at ATP Tour level, Grand Slam level, and in Davis Cup)
- Career titles: 0
- Highest ranking: No. 65 (28 January 2002)

Grand Slam singles results
- Australian Open: 3R (2002)
- French Open: 2R (2001, 2007)
- Wimbledon: 2R (2001)
- US Open: 2R (2001, 2002, 2004, 2006)

Other tournaments
- Olympic Games: 2R (2000)

Doubles
- Career record: 6–24 (at ATP Tour level, Grand Slam level, and in Davis Cup)
- Career titles: 0
- Highest ranking: No. 172 (23 July 2007)

Grand Slam doubles results
- French Open: 1R (2007)
- Wimbledon: 1R (2007)
- Last updated on: 28 October 2021.

Kristian Peter Pless (born 9 February 1981) is a former professional male tennis player from Denmark.

== Tennis career ==
=== Juniors ===
Pless had an excellent junior career, winning the 1999 Australian Open Boys' Singles (defeated Mikhail Youzhny), and reaching the Boys' final at both Wimbledon (lost to Jürgen Melzer), and the US Open (lost to Jarkko Nieminen) the same year. He finished 1999 as the No. 1 ranked junior player in the world.

=== Pro tour ===
He turned professional in 1999, and on 28 January 2002, Kristian Pless reached his career-high ATP singles ranking of World No. 65. He has won tournaments at the Futures and Challenger levels, and has reached three semifinals on the ATP Tour. He suffered a serious shoulder injury in 2003, which after multiple surgery kept him out of competition for almost a year.

After returning from injury in 2004, he had dropped in the rankings to World No. 846 on 24 May. Subsequently, he has gradually climbed the rankings, and after successful performances at the Challenger level in autumn 2006, he entered the Top 100 again. In January 2007, he continued his good performances as he defeated World No. 8 David Nalbandian in three sets in the first round of Chennai Open. This was Pless' first win against a Top-10 ranked player.

In 2007 he also managed to take a set from tennis legend Roger Federer at their meeting in Dubai, but eventually Federer won the tie 7–6^{(2)}, 3–6, 6–3. It was first set Federer had lost that year after he had won the Australian Open without losing a single set.

In 2008 he reached two Challenger finals (in Izmir, Turkey and Rimouski, Canada), but ended the year outside of Top 100. 2009 was his last year on tour.

== Junior Grand Slam finals ==
=== Singles: 3 (1 title, 2 runner-ups) ===
Result	Year	Tournament	Surface	Opponent	Score
Win	1999	Australian Open	Hard	(Russia) Mikhail Youzhny	6–4, 6–3
Loss	1999	Wimbledon	Grass	(Austria) Jürgen Melzer	6–7, 3–6
Loss	1999	US Open	Hard	(Finland) Jarkko Nieminen	7–6, 3–6, 4–6

=== Doubles: 2 (1 title, 1 runner-up) ===
Result	Year	Tournament	Surface	Partnet	Opponents	Score
Win	1999	Australian Open	Hard	(Austria) Jürgen Melzer	(Czech Republic) Ladislav Chramosta (Czech Republic) Michal Navrátil	6–7, 6–3, 6–0
Loss	1999	French Open	Clay	(Belgium) Olivier Rochus	(Georgia (country)) Irakli Labadze (Croatia) Lovro Zovko	1–6, 6–7

== ATP Challenger and ITF Futures finals ==
=== Singles: 20 (7–13) ===
Legend ATP Challenger (4–11) ITF Futures (3–2)	Finals by surface Hard (1–9) Clay (4–2) Grass (0–0) Carpet (2–2)

Result	W–L	Date	Tournament	Tier	Surface	Opponent	Score
Loss	0–1	Apr 1999	New Zealand F3, Christchurch	Futures	Hard	(South Africa) Louis Vosloo	4–6, 3–6
Win	1–1	May 2000	Austria F3, Schwaz	Futures	Clay	(Republic of Ireland) Scott Barron	6–3, 7–5
Win	2–1	Jun 2000	Ireland F1, Dublin	Futures	Carpet	(Australia) Grant Doyle	6–3, 6–7^{(5–7)}, 6–1
Win	3–1	Aug 2000	Hungary F6, Budapest	Futures	Clay	(Austria) Alexander Peya	7–5, 6–3
Loss	3–2	Feb 2001	Hull, United Kingdom	Challenger	Carpet	(Germany) Michael Kohlmann	7–5, 6–7^{(3–7)}, 6–7^{(5–7)}
Win	4–2	May 2001	Edinburgh, United Kingdom	Challenger	Clay	(Spain) Gorka Fraile	6–3, 6–3
Loss	4–3	Jun 2001	Furth, Germany	Challenger	Clay	(Spain) Germán Puentes	4–6, 3–6
Win	5–3	Dec 2001	Rio de Janeiro, Brazil	Challenger	Hard	(Brazil) Ricardo Mello	6–1, 6–1
Loss	5–4	Jun 2004	Poland F3, Warsaw	Futures	Clay	(Czech Republic) Dušan Karol	3–6, 4–6
Loss	5–5	Aug 2005	Belo Horizonte, Brazil	Challenger	Hard	(United States) John Paul Fruttero	6–7^{(4–7)}, 6–7^{(6–8)}
Loss	5–6	Oct 2005	Southampton, United Kingdom	Challenger	Hard	(France) Jérôme Haehnel	2–6, 3–6
Loss	5–7	Jul 2006	Dublin, Ireland	Challenger	Carpet	(Germany) Mischa Zverev	5–7, 6–7^{(6–8)}
Loss	5–8	Oct 2006	Nottingham, United Kingdom	Challenger	Hard	(Germany) Alexander Waske	4–6, 3–6
Win	6–8	Nov 2006	Rimouski, Canada	Challenger	Carpet	(Chinese Taipei) Lu Yen-hsun	6–4, 7–6^{(7–5)}
Loss	6–9	Nov 2006	Nashville, United States	Challenger	Hard	(Netherlands) Robin Haase	6–7^{(9–11)}, 3–6
Win	7–9	Apr 2007	Saint-Brieuc, France	Challenger	Clay	(Uzbekistan) Farrukh Dustov	6–3, 6–1
Loss	7–10	Sep 2007	Grenoble, France	Challenger	Hard	(Ecuador) Nicolás Lapentti	3–6, 5–7
Loss	7–11	Mar 2008	Cherbourg, France	Challenger	Hard	(France) Thierry Ascione	5–7, 6–7^{(5–7)}
Loss	7–12	Jun 2008	Izmir, Turkey	Challenger	Hard	(Luxembourg) Gilles Müller	5–7, 3–6
Loss	7–13	Nov 2008	Rimouski, Canada	Challenger	Hard	(United States) Ryan Sweeting	4–6, 6–7^{(3–7)}

=== Doubles: 7 (4–3) ===
Legend ATP Challenger (4–1) ITF Futures (0–2)	Finals by surface Hard (2–2) Clay (0–0) Grass (1–0) Carpet (1–1)

Result	W–L	Date	Tournament	Tier	Surface	Partner	Opponents	Score
Loss	0–1	Apr 1999	New Zealand F3, Christchurch	Futures	Hard	(New Zealand) Mark Nielsen	(United States) Wynn Criswell (South Africa) Shaun Rudman	2–6, 6–2, 1–6
Win	1–1	Dec 1999	Lucknow, India	Challenger	Grass	(Thailand) Paradorn Srichaphan	(United Kingdom) Martin Lee (United Kingdom) Jamie Delgado	5–7, 6–3, 7–5
Loss	1–2	Jun 2000	Ireland F1, Dublin	Futures	Carpet	(Finland) Jarkko Nieminen	(Belgium) Gilles Elseneer (France) Jean-Michel Pequery	6–7^{(2–7)}, 6–4, 3–6
Win	2–2	Dec 2000	Prague, Czech Republic	Challenger	Hard	(Pakistan) Aisam Qureshi	(Switzerland) Ivo Heuberger (Finland) Ville Liukko	6–4, 6–4
Win	3–2	Jul 2005	Campos do Jordão, Brazil	Challenger	Hard	(Socialist Federal Republic of Yugoslavia) Aleksandar Vlaski	(Brazil) Franco Ferreiro (Brazil) Marcelo Melo	7–6^{(7–5)}, 6–4
Win	4–2	Nov 2006	Rimouski, Canada	Challenger	Carpet	(Denmark) Frederik Nielsen	(Netherlands) Jasper Smit (Netherlands) Martijn van Haasteren	6–2, 6–4
Loss	4–3	Nov 2008	Rimouski, Canada	Challenger	Hard	(Sweden) Michael Ryderstedt	(Canada) Milos Raonic (Canada) Vasek Pospisil	7–5, 4–6, [6–10]

== Performance timeline ==
Key
W	F	SF	QF	#R	RR	Q#	DNQ	A	NH

(W) winner; (F) finalist; (SF) semifinalist; (QF) quarterfinalist; (#R) rounds 4, 3, 2, 1; (RR) round-robin stage; (Q#) qualification round; (DNQ) did not qualify; (A) absent; (NH) not held; (SR) strike rate (events won / competed); (W–L) win–loss record.

=== Singles ===
Tournament	2000	2001	2002	2003	2004	2005	2006	2007	2008	2009	SR	W–L	Win%
Grand Slam tournaments
Australian Open	A	Q1	3R	1R	A	Q3	Q2	1R	Q1	A	0 / 3	2–3	40%
French Open	A	2R	1R	A	1R	Q3	1R	2R	A	A	0 / 5	2–5	29%
Wimbledon	A	2R	1R	A	1R	Q2	1R	1R	Q2	Q2	0 / 5	1–5	17%
US Open	Q2	2R	2R	A	2R	Q2	2R	1R	Q2	A	0 / 5	4–5	44%
Win–loss	0–0	3–3	3–4	0–1	1–3	0–0	1–3	1–4	0–0	0–0	0 / 18	9–18	33%
ATP Tour Masters 1000
Indian Wells	A	A	Q2	Q2	A	A	A	1R	A	A	0 / 1	0–1	0%
Miami	A	Q1	1R	A	A	A	A	A	A	A	0 / 1	0–1	0%
Monte Carlo	A	Q1	2R	A	A	A	A	A	A	A	0 / 1	1–1	50%
Hamburg	A	A	A	A	A	A	A	Q1	A	NMS	0 / 0	0–0	–
Rome	A	A	Q2	A	A	A	A	A	A	A	0 / 0	0–0	–
Canada Masters	A	A	2R	A	A	A	Q1	A	A	A	0 / 1	1–1	50%
Cincinnati	A	A	Q1	A	A	A	Q1	A	A	A	0 / 0	0–-0	–
Stuttgart	A	Q1	Not Held								0 / 0	0–-0	–
Win–loss	0–0	0–0	2–3	0–0	0–0	0–0	0–0	0–1	0–0	0–0	0 / 4	2–4	33%

== See also ==
- List of Denmark Davis Cup team representatives

Preceded by Roger Federer	ITF Junior World Champion; 1999	Succeeded by Andy Roddick
