= 1999 Australian Open – Men's singles =

Men's singles
- 1999 Australian Open

Final
- Champion: (Russia) Yevgeny Kafelnikov
- Runner-up: (Sweden) Thomas Enqvist
- Score: 4–6, 6–0, 6–3, 7–6^{(7–1)}

Details
- Draw: 128
- Seeds: 16

Events
Singles	men	women		boys	girls
Doubles	men	women	mixed	boys	girls
WC Singles	men	women	quad
WC Doubles	men	women	quad
Legends	men	women	mixed
- Australian Open

Yevgeny Kafelnikov defeated Thomas Enqvist in the final, 4–6, 6–0, 6–3, 7–6^{(7–1)} to win the men's singles tennis title at the 1999 Australian Open. It was his second and last major singles title, after the 1996 French Open. With the win, Kafelnikov became the first Russian (male or female) to win an Australian Open singles title.

Petr Korda was the defending champion, but lost in the third round to Todd Martin.

== Seeds ==
1. (Chile) ~~Marcelo Ríos~~ (withdrew due to hamstring injury)
2. (Spain) Àlex Corretja (second round)
3. (Australia) Patrick Rafter (third round)
4. (Spain) Carlos Moyá (first round)
5. (United States) Andre Agassi (fourth round)
6. (United Kingdom) Tim Henman (third round)
7. (Slovakia) Karol Kučera (quarterfinals)
8. (United Kingdom) Greg Rusedski (second round)
9. (Netherlands) Richard Krajicek (third round)
10. (Russia) Yevgeny Kafelnikov (champion)
11. (Croatia) ~~Goran Ivanišević~~ (withdrew due to shoulder injury)
12. (Spain) Albert Costa (first round)
13. (France) Cédric Pioline (first round)
14. (Australia) Mark Philippoussis (fourth round)
15. (United States) Todd Martin (quarterfinals)
16. (Sweden) Thomas Johansson (first round)

Click on the seed number of a player to go to their draw section.

== Draw ==
Key

- Q = Qualifier
- WC = Wild card
- LL = Lucky loser
- Alt = Alternate
- ITF = ITF entry
- PR = Protected ranking
- SR = Special ranking
- SE = Special exempt
- JE = Junior exempt
- JR = Junior Accelerator Programme entrant
- CO = College Accelerator Programme entrant
- NG = Next Gen Accelerator Program entrant
- w/o = Walkover
- r = Retired
- d = Defaulted

=== Finals ===
Quarterfinals
15	(United States) Todd Martin	2	6^{1}	2
10	(Russia) Yevgeny Kafelnikov	6	7^{7}	6
(Germany) Tommy Haas	7^{7}	7	6
(United States) Vince Spadea	6^{5}	5	3
(Switzerland) Marc Rosset	3	4	4
(Sweden) Thomas Enqvist	6	6	6
7	(Slovakia) Karol Kučera	6^{4}	7^{8}	2	6	6
(Ecuador) Nicolás Lapentti	7^{7}	6^{6}	6	0	8

Semifinals
10	(Russia) Yevgeny Kafelnikov	6	6	7
(Germany) Tommy Haas	3	4	5
(Sweden) Thomas Enqvist	6	7	6
(Ecuador) Nicolás Lapentti	3	5	1

Final
10	(Russia) Yevgeny Kafelnikov	4	6	6	7^{7}
(Sweden) Thomas Enqvist	6	0	3	6^{1}

=== Top half ===
==== Section 1 ====
First round
LL	(Spain) Ó Serrano	6	3	6^{6}	3
(Italy) G Pozzi	3	6	7^{8}	6
(Spain) A Portas	3	1	2
(France) L Roux	6	6	6
(Zimbabwe) W Black	6	6	6
(Romania) A Voinea	2	4	1
(Ukraine) A Medvedev	7^{7}	6	3	6
Q	(South Africa) J Bower	6^{0}	1	6	3
(Czech Republic) P Korda	6	6^{1}	6	6^{4}	6
(Spain) G Blanco	3	7^{7}	4	7^{7}	2
(Spain) J Alonso	6	6	6
(Canada) S Lareau	3	4	2
(Spain) C Costa	2	6	4	3
(Germany) H Dreekmann	6	2	6	6
(Brazil) F Meligeni	6	6	3	4	1
15	(United States) T Martin	3	4	6	6	6

Second round
(Italy) G Pozzi	2	6	6	3
(France) L Roux	6	3	1	0^{r}
(Zimbabwe) W Black	6	6	3	4	6
(Ukraine) A Medvedev	4	4	6	6	2
(Czech Republic) P Korda	6	6	6
(Spain) J Alonso	3	1	1
(Germany) H Dreekmann	6	2	6^{5}	2
15	(United States) T Martin	4	6	7^{7}	6

Third round
(Italy) G Pozzi	3	6	5	2
(Zimbabwe) W Black	6	4	7	6
(Czech Republic) P Korda	5	6	6^{2}	7	4
15	(United States) T Martin	7	4	7^{7}	5	6

Fourth round
(Zimbabwe) W Black	6^{3}	4	4
15	(United States) T Martin	7^{7}	6	6

==== Section 2 ====
First round
10	(Russia) Y Kafelnikov	6	6	6
(Sweden) J Björkman	3	2	4
Q	(Sweden) F Jonsson	3	6^{6}	4
(Australia) J Stoltenberg	6	7^{8}	6
(Netherlands) P Wessels	3	2	6^{0}
(United States) J Courier	6	6	7^{7}
(Spain) F Mantilla	7^{7}	6^{1}	3	6	4
(Morocco) Y El Aynaoui	6^{0}	7^{7}	6	3	6
Q	(France) S Huet	1	6	6	7
(France) A Di Pasquale	6	3	2	5
(Romania) A Pavel	7^{7}	6	4	6
Q	(Spain) J Sánchez	6^{5}	2	6	4
(Denmark) K Carlsen	6	3	0	2
Q	(United States) P Goldstein	2	6	6	6
(Australia) S Draper	6^{3}	6	4	6^{5}
8	(United Kingdom) G Rusedski	7^{7}	2	6	7^{7}

Second round
10	(Russia) Y Kafelnikov	7	3	7^{12}	7^{7}
(Australia) J Stoltenberg	5	6	6^{10}	6^{3}
(United States) J Courier	7^{7}	6	5	6
(Morocco) Y El Aynaoui	6^{2}	4	7	2
Q	(France) S Huet	4	6	4	3
(Romania) A Pavel	6	1	6	6
Q	(United States) P Goldstein	6	6^{9}	7^{7}	6
8	(United Kingdom) G Rusedski	4	7^{11}	6^{5}	2

Third round
10	(Russia) Y Kafelnikov	5	6	6	3
(United States) J Courier	7	4	2	0^{r}
(Romania) A Pavel	3	6	2	7	6
Q	(United States) P Goldstein	6	3	6	5	3

Fourth round
10	(Russia) Y Kafelnikov	6	7^{7}	6^{5}	3	6
(Romania) A Pavel	3	6^{5}	7^{7}	6	4

==== Section 3 ====
First round
4	(Spain) C Moyà	7^{9}	4	6^{6}	3
(Germany) N Kiefer	6^{7}	6	7^{8}	6
Q	(United States) C Mamiit	6	6	6
(Austria) S Koubek	4	3	2
(Spain) A Martín	3	5	4
(France) G Raoux	6	7	6
Q	(United States) D Caldwell	2	4	4
(France) F Santoro	6	6	6
(Canada) D Nestor	6	6^{5}	6	7^{11}
Q	(Belarus) V Voltchkov	3	7^{7}	1	6^{9}
(Austria) T Muster	6	3	3	3
(Netherlands) S Schalken	2	6	6	6
(Germany) T Haas	7^{7}	6	7
(Germany) M Kohlmann	6^{5}	2	5
WC	(Australia) L Hewitt	6	6	6
13	(France) C Pioline	3	1	1

Second round
(Germany) N Kiefer	6	7	7^{9}
Q	(United States) C Mamiit	2	5	6^{7}
(France) G Raoux	4	6	2	6	3
(France) F Santoro	6	1	6	4	6
(Canada) D Nestor	7	6	6
(Netherlands) S Schalken	5	1	0
(Germany) T Haas	4	6	6	6
WC	(Australia) L Hewitt	6	4	3	4

Third round
(Germany) N Kiefer	6^{7}	1	3
(France) F Santoro	7^{9}	6	6
(Canada) D Nestor	5	6	3	4
(Germany) T Haas	7	4	6	6

Fourth round
(France) F Santoro	2	3	5
(Germany) T Haas	6	6	7

==== Section 4 ====
First round
12	(Spain) A Costa	4	6	4	4
(Czech Republic) M Damm	6	4	6	6
(Netherlands) J Siemerink	4	6	2	3
(Armenia) S Sargsian	6	3	6	6
(Paraguay) R Delgado	7^{7}	3	2	0
(United States) V Spadea	6^{5}	6	6	6
(Argentina) F Squillari	7^{11}	6	6
Q	(Germany) L Burgsmüller	6^{9}	4	4
(United States) S Campbell	6	3	4	4
(France) A Clément	4	6	6	6
(Czech Republic) J Novák	6	6	6
(Spain) F Clavet	3	4	3
(Czech Republic) S Doseděl	6	6	6
(Romania) D Pescariu	4	3	3
(Argentina) H Gumy	0	3	0
5	(United States) A Agassi	6	6	6

Second round
(Czech Republic) M Damm	4	6	6^{3}	6	6
(Armenia) S Sargsian	6	3	7^{7}	4	3
(United States) V Spadea	6	6	6
(Argentina) F Squillari	3	4	4
(France) A Clément	6	7^{7}	0	3	3
(Czech Republic) J Novák	3	6^{1}	6	6	6
(Czech Republic) S Doseděl	6^{5}	2	0
5	(United States) A Agassi	7^{7}	6	6

Third round
(Czech Republic) M Damm	3	4	4
(United States) V Spadea	6	6	6
(Czech Republic) J Novák	3	2	1
5	(United States) A Agassi	6	6	6

Fourth round
(United States) V Spadea	6	7	6^{3}	6
5	(United States) A Agassi	1	5	7^{7}	3

=== Bottom half ===
==== Section 5 ====
First round
6	(United Kingdom) T Henman	6	6	6
(Morocco) K Alami	3	2	1
(Argentina) G Cañas	6	6^{4}	3	3
WC	(Australia) S Stolle	2	7^{7}	6	6
(Australia) T Woodbridge	4	2	4
(Switzerland) M Rosset	6	6	6
WC	(Australia) W Arthurs	6	6	6^{2}	5	6
(Germany) J Knippschild	3	4	7^{7}	7	8
WC	(Australia) M Tebbutt	2	4	2
(Netherlands) P Haarhuis	6	6	6
(United States) J Tarango	6^{5}	6	6^{3}	6	4
(Spain) A Berasategui	7^{7}	3	7^{7}	4	1^{r}
(Czech Republic) B Ulihrach	6	7	2	4	6
(France) S Grosjean	3	5	6	6	3
Q	(Russia) A Cherkasov	6	6	6
LL	(Germany) B Karbacher	2	1	1

Second round
6	(United Kingdom) T Henman	4	7	4	6	6
WC	(Australia) S Stolle	6	5	6	1	4
(Switzerland) M Rosset	6^{7}	7^{7}	6	6
(Germany) J Knippschild	7^{9}	6^{2}	1	3
(Netherlands) P Haarhuis	1	6	6	4	0
(United States) J Tarango	6	3	4	6	6
(Czech Republic) B Ulihrach	7^{7}	4	6^{3}	6	6
Q	(Russia) A Cherkasov	6^{5}	6	7^{7}	4	4

Third round
6	(United Kingdom) T Henman	6^{5}	3	5
(Switzerland) M Rosset	7^{7}	6	7
(United States) J Tarango	6	3	2	3
(Czech Republic) B Ulihrach	1	6	6	6

Fourth round
(Switzerland) M Rosset	6	6	6
(Czech Republic) B Ulihrach	3	4	2

==== Section 6 ====
First round
14	(Australia) M Philippoussis	6	6	6
(United States) G Grant	3	4	3
(United States) M Chang	7^{9}	6	6
(New Zealand) B Steven	6^{7}	3	3
(Costa Rica) JA Marín	1	6^{1}	6^{5}
(Slovakia) J Krošlák	6	7^{7}	7^{7}
(Argentina) M Puerta	6	5	6	6
Q	(Brazil) M Carlsson	0	7	1	4
WC	(Australia) T Mitchell	6	2	2
(Zimbabwe) B Black	7	6	6
(Sweden) T Enqvist	6	7^{7}	6
(United States) JM Gambill	3	6^{5}	4
WC	(Australia) M Draper	6^{4}	4	4
(Australia) M Woodforde	7^{7}	6	6
(Germany) O Gross	2	4	3
3	(Australia) P Rafter	6	6	6

Second round
14	(Australia) M Philippoussis	7^{7}	2	6	5	7
(United States) M Chang	6^{1}	6	3	7	5
(Slovakia) J Krošlák	3	4	7^{7}	6	6
(Argentina) M Puerta	6	6	6^{4}	4	1
(Zimbabwe) B Black	6^{6}	6^{2}	0
(Sweden) T Enqvist	7^{8}	7^{7}	6
(Australia) M Woodforde	2	4	4
3	(Australia) P Rafter	6	6	6

Third round
14	(Australia) M Philippoussis	3	6	6	6
(Slovakia) J Krošlák	6	3	4	1
(Sweden) T Enqvist	6	4	6	6
3	(Australia) P Rafter	4	6	4	4

Fourth round
14	(Australia) M Philippoussis	2	4	7^{7}	6	2
(Sweden) T Enqvist	6	6	6^{3}	4	6

==== Section 7 ====
First round
7	(Slovakia) K Kučera	6	7^{7}	6
(Spain) F Vicente	2	6^{4}	3
(India) L Paes	4	4	1
(Italy) D Sanguinetti	6	6	6
(Russia) M Safin	6	7^{7}	7^{7}
(Germany) D Prinosil	2	6^{4}	6^{3}
Q	(South Africa) M Ondruska	4	3	3
(Brazil) G Kuerten	6	6	6
(South Africa) W Ferreira	7^{7}	6	6
Q	(Austria) M Hipfl	6^{4}	1	2
(Slovakia) D Hrbatý	4	6	6	6^{3}	3
(Czech Republic) D Vacek	6	1	2	7^{7}	6
WC	(Australia) J Sirianni	6	4	3	6	2
(Argentina) M Zabaleta	3	6	6	4	6
(Morocco) H Arazi	7^{7}	2	4	2
9	(Netherlands) R Krajicek	6^{4}	6	6	6

Second round
7	(Slovakia) K Kučera	7	6	6
(Italy) D Sanguinetti	5	1	4
(Russia) M Safin	6	5	4	6	6
(Brazil) G Kuerten	3	7	6	3	4
(South Africa) W Ferreira	6	2	6	6
(Czech Republic) D Vacek	4	6	3	1
(Argentina) M Zabaleta	3	2	5
9	(Netherlands) R Krajicek	6	6	7

Third round
7	(Slovakia) K Kučera	6	6	6
(Russia) M Safin	2	3	2
(South Africa) W Ferreira	6^{1}	6^{5}	6	6	6
9	(Netherlands) R Krajicek	7^{7}	7^{7}	4	2	3

Fourth round
7	(Slovakia) K Kučera	6	6	7
(South Africa) W Ferreira	3	1	5

==== Section 8 ====
First round
16	(Sweden) T Johansson	3	6	6	6^{4}	0
(Ecuador) N Lapentti	6	3	3	7^{7}	6
(Netherlands) J van Lottum	4	7	6	2	5
(Sweden) M Norman	6	5	2	6	7
(Sweden) M Tillström	5	7^{7}	6	6
(Italy) L Tieleman	7	6^{5}	3	4
(United States) J Gimelstob	6	7^{7}	6
Q	(Germany) R Schüttler	2	6^{4}	1
Q	(Netherlands) E Kempes	2	3	6	3
(Australia) A Ilie	6	6	3	6
(France) J Golmard	6	7^{7}	6
Q	(Czech Republic) P Luxa	2	6^{4}	4
(Argentina) L Arnold Ker	5	6	4	2
(Norway) C Ruud	7	3	6	6
WC	(Japan) T Suzuki	3	6	6	6^{5}	2
2	(Spain) À Corretja	6	4	3	7^{7}	6

Second round
(Ecuador) N Lapentti	7^{7}	3	2	6	6
(Sweden) M Norman	6^{4}	6	6	3	4
(Sweden) M Tillström	6	6	6
(United States) J Gimelstob	3	4	1
(Australia) A Ilie	4	7^{7}	6	6
(France) J Golmard	6	6^{3}	4	4
(Norway) C Ruud	3	6	6	6
2	(Spain) À Corretja	6	3	4	4

Third round
(Ecuador) N Lapentti	4	7^{11}	2	6	6
(Sweden) M Tillström	6	6^{9}	6	4	2
(Australia) A Ilie	6	6	6
(Norway) C Ruud	2	2	4

Fourth round
(Ecuador) N Lapentti	6	6	4	6
(Australia) A Ilie	4	2	6	2

Preceded by 1998 US Open – Men's singles	Grand Slam men's singles	Succeeded by 1999 French Open – Men's singles
