= 1999 Australian Open – Girls' singles =

Girls' singles
- 1999 Australian Open

Final
- Champion: (France) Virginie Razzano
- Runner-up: (Slovakia) Katarína Bašternáková
- Score: 6–1, 6–1

Events
| Singles | men | women | | boys | girls |
| Doubles | men | women | mixed | boys | girls |
| WC Singles | men | women | quad |
| WC Doubles | men | women | quad |
| Legends | men | women | mixed |
- Australian Open

Following are the results of the 1999 Australian Open girls' singles. The 1999 Australian Open was a tennis tournament played on outdoor hard courts at Melbourne Park in Melbourne in Victoria in Australia. It was the 87th edition of the Australian Open and was held from 18 through 31 January 1999. This was the first Grand Slam of the calendar year.

Jelena Kostanić was the defending champion, but did not compete in 1999.
French thirteenth seed Virginie Razzano won the title, defeating Slovakian ninth seed Katarína Bašternáková in the final, 6–1, 6–1.

== Seeds ==
1. (Russia) Nadia Petrova (semifinals)
2. (Slovenia) Tina Hergold (semifinals)
3. (Indonesia) Wynne Prakusya (third round)
4. (Greece) Eleni Daniilidou (quarterfinals)
5. (United States) Ansley Cargill (first round)
7. (Czech Republic) Iveta Benešová (first round)
8. (Czech Republic) Dája Bedáňová (second round)
8. (United States) Laura Granville (third round)
9. (Slovakia) Katarína Bašternáková (final)
10. (France) Melinda Malouli (third round)
11. (Netherlands) Michelle Gerards (second round)
12. (New Zealand) Leanne Baker (quarterfinals)
13. (France) Virginie Razzano (champion)
14. (Slovakia) Zuzana Kučová (third round)
15. (Hungary) Györgyi Zsíros (first round)
16. (South Africa) Aniela Mojzis (second round)

== Draw ==
Key

- Q = Qualifier
- WC = Wild card
- LL = Lucky loser
- Alt = Alternate
- ITF = ITF entry
- PR = Protected ranking
- SR = Special ranking
- SE = Special exempt
- JE = Junior exempt
- JR = Junior Accelerator Programme entrant
- CO = College Accelerator Programme entrant
- NG = Next Gen Accelerator Program entrant
- w/o = Walkover
- r = Retired
- d = Defaulted

=== Finals ===
Quarterfinals
1/Q | (Russia) Nadia Petrova | 6 | 6
(United Kingdom) Hannah Collin | 3 | 2
4 | (Greece) Eleni Daniilidou | 6 | 2 | 2
13 | (France) Virginie Razzano | 1 | 6 | 6
9 | (Slovakia) Katarína Bašternáková | 6 | 5 | 6
12 | (New Zealand) Leanne Baker | 3 | 7 | 4
(Italy) Roberta Vinci | 4 | 5
2 | (Slovenia) Tina Hergold | 6 | 7

Semifinals
1/Q | (Russia) Nadia Petrova | 2 | 4
13 | (France) Virginie Razzano | 6 | 6
9 | (Slovakia) Katarína Bašternáková | 5 | 6 | 6
2 | (Slovenia) Tina Hergold | 7 | 3 | 4

Final
13 | (France) Virginie Razzano | 6 | 6
9 | (Slovakia) Katarína Bašternáková | 1 | 1

=== Top half ===
==== Section 1 ====
First round
1/Q | (Russia) N Petrova | 6 | 7
WC | (Australia) J Belobrajdic | 4 | 5
(Canada) K Krishnamurthy | 6 | 6 | 6
Q | (Australia) C Horiatopoulos | 0 | 7 | 4
(Japan) C Ito | 7 | 6
(Serbia and Montenegro) D Milošević | 6 | 3
(Slovakia) L Tvarosková | 6 | 6 | 3
16 | (South Africa) A Mojzis | 7 | 0 | 6
11 | (Netherlands) M Gerards | 6 | 6
(France) O Sanchez | 4 | 3
(United Kingdom) H Collin | 6 | 6
(Australia) M Dowse | 1 | 1
(Australia) M-A Clayton | 6 | 6
LL | (Australia) D McIntyre | 1 | 2
Q | (Italy) F Pennetta | 6 | 6
5 | (United States) A Cargill | 2 | 1

Second round
1/Q | (Russia) N Petrova | 6 | 6
(Canada) K Krishnamurthy | 2 | 2
(Japan) C Ito | 5 | 6 | 6
16 | (South Africa) A Mojzis | 7 | 3 | 2
11 | (Netherlands) M Gerards | 6 | 5 | 2
(United Kingdom) H Collin | 4 | 7 | 6
(Australia) M-A Clayton | 6 | 6
Q | (Italy) F Pennetta | 1 | 3

Third round
1/Q | (Russia) N Petrova | 6 | 6
(Japan) C Ito | 1 | 1
(United Kingdom) H Collin | 6 | 6
(Australia) M-A Clayton | 2 | 4

Quarterfinals
1/Q | (Russia) N Petrova | 6 | 6
(United Kingdom) H Collin | 3 | 2

==== Section 2 ====
First round
4 | (Greece) E Daniilidou | 6 | 6
(Canada) M-È Pelletier | 4 | 3
(South Africa) A de Bruyn | 2 | 2
Q | (Australia) S Stone | 6 | 6
(United States) L Dawaf | 7 | 6
(Thailand) P Laosirichon | 5 | 1
(Australia) R Rosenfield | 4 | 4
14 | (Slovakia) Z Kučová | 6 | 6
13 | (France) V Razzano | 6 | 6
WC | (Australia) N Sewell | 1 | 2
WC | (Australia) K van Elden | 6 | 6
(Japan) R Uda | 4 | 4
(Hungary) K Berecz | 7 | 6
LL | (Australia) K Browne | 6 | 3
WC | (Australia) C Wheeler | 7 | 6
7 | (Czech Republic) I Benešová | 6 | 3

Second round
4 | (Greece) E Daniilidou | 6 | 6
Q | (Australia) S Stone | 4 | 0
(United States) L Dawaf | 6 | 3 | 1
14 | (Slovakia) Z Kučová | 2 | 6 | 6
13 | (France) V Razzano | 6 | 6
WC | (Australia) K van Elden | 0 | 0
(Hungary) K Berecz | 6 | 3 | 6
WC | (Australia) C Wheeler | 2 | 6 | 4

Third round
4 | (Greece) E Daniilidou | 6 | 6
14 | (Slovakia) Z Kučová | 0 | 1
13 | (France) V Razzano | 6 | 6
(Hungary) K Berecz | 4 | 0

Quarterfinals
4 | (Greece) E Daniilidou | 6 | 2 | 2
13 | (France) V Razzano | 1 | 6 | 6

=== Bottom half ===
==== Section 3 ====
First round
8 | (United States) L Granville | 6 | 1 | 6
(Hungary) A Kapros | 4 | 6 | 4
Q | (Greece) A Kaplani | 6 | 6
(Czech Republic) D Luzarová | 3 | 0
(Italy) ME Camerin | 6 | 6
(South Africa) N Grandin | 3 | 4
(Australia) M Adamczak | 2 | 7 | 2
9 | (Slovakia) K Bašternáková | 6 | 6 | 6
12 | (New Zealand) L Baker | 1 | 6 | 6
(Japan) K Aoyama | 6 | 2 | 3
Q | (Australia) B Kelly | 5 | 6 | 6
WC | (Australia) S Stosur | 7 | 1 | 3
(France) S Cohen-Aloro | 6 | 6
WC | (Australia) N Kriz | 2 | 2
(Australia) K Pinchbeck | 2 | 6 | 4
3/Q | (Indonesia) W Prakusya | 6 | 4 | 6

Second round
8 | (United States) L Granville | 6 | 6 | 6
Q | (Greece) A Kaplani | 7 | 1 | 3
(Italy) ME Camerin | 0 | 0
9 | (Slovakia) K Bašternáková | 6 | 6
12 | (New Zealand) L Baker | 6 | 6
Q | (Australia) B Kelly | 4 | 0
(France) S Cohen-Aloro | 1 | 6 | 1
3/Q | (Indonesia) W Prakusya | 6 | 1 | 6

Third round
8 | (United States) L Granville | 1 | 3
9 | (Slovakia) K Bašternáková | 6 | 6
12 | (New Zealand) L Baker | 7 | 3 | 6
3/Q | (Indonesia) W Prakusya | 5 | 6 | 4

Quarterfinals
9 | (Slovakia) K Bašternáková | 6 | 5 | 6
12 | (New Zealand) L Baker | 3 | 7 | 4

==== Section 4 ====
First round
8 | (Czech Republic) D Bedáňová | 6 | 6
(Japan) K Iljima | 2 | 3
(Italy) R Vinci | 6 | 6
(Sweden) A Bengtsson | 0 | 2
(Canada) N Bogdanovich | 6 | 3
Q | (Australia) B Sekulovski | 7 | 6
(South Africa) N Rencken | 6 | 5
10 | (France) M Malouli | 7 | 7
15 | (Hungary) G Zsíros | 6 | 2 | 0
(Thailand) S Viratprasert | 2 | 6 | 6
(United States) J Scaringe | 6 | 6
(Norway) C Tidemand | 1 | 4
WC | (Australia) J Hewitt | 6 | 6
(South Africa) N Van Der Merwe | 2 | 1
WC | (Australia) E Gott | 6 | 2 | 6
2 | (Slovenia) T Hergold | 0 | 6 | 8

Second round
8 | (Czech Republic) D Bedáňová | 3 | 4
(Italy) R Vinci | 6 | 6
Q | (Australia) B Sekulovski | 1 | 4
10 | (France) M Malouli | 6 | 6
(Thailand) S Viratprasert | 4 | 2
(United States) J Scaringe | 6 | 6
WC | (Australia) J Hewitt | 6 | 2 | 5
2 | (Slovenia) T Hergold | 4 | 6 | 7

Third round
(Italy) R Vinci | 6 | 2
10 | (France) M Malouli | 7 | 2 | r
(United States) J Scaringe | 7 | 6 | 2
2 | (Slovenia) T Hergold | 6 | 7 | 6

Quarterfinals
(Italy) R Vinci | 4 | 5
2 | (Slovenia) T Hergold | 6 | 7
