= Philip Gubenco =

Canadian tennis player

- Country (sports): Canada
- Born: 14 March 1982 (age 43) Quebec, Canada
- Height: 6 ft 2 in (188 cm)
- Plays: Left-handed
- Prize money: $57,182

Singles
- Career record: 0–1 (ATP Tour)
- Career titles: 0; 0 Challenger, 0 Futures
- Highest ranking: No. 519 (10 May 2004)

Doubles
- Career record: 0–3 (ATP Tour)
- Career titles: 0; 0 Challenger, 9 Futures
- Highest ranking: No. 279 (22 May 2006)
- Last updated on: 24 December 2021.

Philip Gubenco (born 14 March 1982) is a Canadian former professional tennis player.

A left-handed player from Quebec, Gubenco was an ITF world number four ranked junior in doubles, forming a successful partnership with Andy Roddick which included World Super Juniors and Eddie Herr International titles.

Gubenco had a best singles ranking of 519 on the professional tour and peaked at 279 in doubles. In 1999 he made an ATP Tour singles main draw appearance as a wildcard at the Canadian Open and was beaten in the first round by Ramón Delgado. He featured in further Canadian Open main draws as a doubles player.

Most of his career was played at ITF Futures level and he was a doubles champion in nine tournaments.

== ITF Futures finals ==
=== Singles: 3 (0–3) ===
Finals by surface
Hard (0–2)
Clay (0–1)

Result	W–L	Date	Tournament	Tier	Surface	Opponent	Score
Loss	0–1	May 2001	Greece F1, Chalkida	Futures	Hard	(Slovenia) Marko Tkalec	6–2, 1–6, 0–6
Loss	0–2	Jun 2003	Canada F3, Lachine	Futures	Hard	(United States) Ryan Sachire	7–5, 3–6, 4–6
Loss	0–3	Apr 2005	Mexico F3, Guadalajara	Futures	Clay	(Brazil) Marcelo Melo	1–6, 4–6

=== Doubles: 15 (9–6) ===
Finals by surface
Hard (8–5)
Clay (1–1)

Result	W–L	Date	Tournament	Tier	Surface	Partner	Opponents	Score
Win	1–0	May 2001	Greece F1, Chalkida	Futures	Hard	(Canada) Jocelyn Robichaud	(Croatia) Ivan Cerovic (Slovenia) Marko Tkalec	6–3, 7–5
Loss	1–1	Oct 2001	USA F22, Lubbock	Futures	Hard	(North Macedonia) Lazar Magdinchev	(Republic of Ireland) John Doran (South Africa) Coenie Van Wyk	4–6, 6–7^{(4–7)}
Win	2–1	Apr 2002	Jamaica F1, Kingston	Futures	Hard	(United States) Tres Davis	(United States) Alex Bogomolov Jr. (United States) Cary Franklin	4–6, 6–3, 7–6^{(7–1)}
Win	3–1	Apr 2002	Jamaica F2, Montego Bay	Futures	Hard	(United States) Tres Davis	(France) Nicolas Devilder (France) Thierry Guardiola	6–1, 4–6, 6–3
Loss	3–2	Sep 2002	Tunisia F2, El Menzah	Futures	Hard	(France) Benoit Foucher	(South Africa) Dirk Stegmann (South Africa) Rik De Voest	4–6, 1–6
Loss	3–3	Sep 2002	Sweden F2, Gothenburg	Futures	Hard	(Netherlands) Jasper Smit	(Germany) Aleksander Djuranovic (Germany) Benjamin Kohllöffel	4–6, 2–6
Loss	3–4	Mar 2004	New Zealand F1, Blenheim	Futures	Hard	(Australia) Domenic Marafiote	(South Korea) Im Kyu-Tae (South Korea) Lee Seung-hoon	6–2, 2–6, 3–6
Win	4–4	Oct 2004	USA F28, Lubbock	Futures	Hard	(France) Julien Cassaigne	(North Macedonia) Lazar Magdinchev (Israel) Dudi Sela	2–6, 7–6^{(7–5)}, 6–4
Loss	4–5	Oct 2004	USA F30, Baton Rouge	Futures	Hard	(France) Julien Cassaigne	(Israel) Michael Kogan (Mexico) Víctor Romero	3–6, 1–6
Win	5–5	Oct 2005	USA F25, Laguna Niguel	Futures	Hard	(Canada) Erik Chvojka	(Canada) Robert Steckley (United States) Lester Cook	7–6^{(7–4)}, 4–6, 6–1
Win	6–5	Mar 2006	Canada F2, Rock-Forest	Futures	Hard	(Canada) Erik Chvojka	(United States) Jeremy Wurtzman (South Africa) Izak Van Der Merwe	7–5, 6–4
Win	7–5	Mar 2006	Canada F3, Montreal	Futures	Hard	(Canada) Erik Chvojka	(Canada) Pierre-Ludovic Duclos (South Africa) Izak Van Der Merwe	7–6^{(7–3)}, 4–6, 7–6^{(7–5)}
Win	8–5	May 2006	Mexico F6, Celaya	Futures	Hard	(Slovenia) Miha Gregorc	(Romania) Roman Borvanov (Switzerland) Sven Swinnen	6–3, 1–6, 7–5
Loss	8–6	Jul 2006	USA F16, Pittsburgh	Futures	Clay	(Canada) Robert Steckley	(Australia) Shannon Nettle (Australia) Daniel Wendler	6–7^{(8–10)}, 3–6
Win	9–6	Oct 2006	Brazil F13, São Leopoldo	Futures	Clay	(Italy) Manuel Jorquera	(Brazil) Carlos Cirne-Lima (Brazil) Renato Silveira	6–7^{(6–8)}, 6–3, 6–3
