= 1999 Australian Open – Mixed doubles =

Mixed doubles
- 1999 Australian Open

Final
- Champions: (South Africa) Mariaan de Swardt (South Africa) David Adams
- Runners-up: (United States) Serena Williams (Belarus) Max Mirnyi
- Score: 6–4, 4–6, 7–6^{(7–5)}

Details
- Draw: 32
- Seeds: 8

Events
Singles	men	women		boys	girls
Doubles	men	women	mixed	boys	girls
WC Singles	men	women	quad
WC Doubles	men	women	quad
Legends	men	women	mixed
- Australian Open

Mariaan de Swardt and David Adams defeated Serena Williams and Max Mirnyi in the final, 6–4, 4–6, 7–6^{(7–5)} to win the mixed doubles tennis title at the 1999 Australian Open.

Venus Williams and Justin Gimelstob were the defending champions, but did not compete that year.

One of the surprises of this tournament was that over half of the seeds lost in the first round, and none of the seeds made it past the second round.

== Seeds ==
1. (Netherlands) Caroline Vis / (Netherlands) Paul Haarhuis (first round)
2. (Russia) Anna Kournikova / (The Bahamas) Mark Knowles (first round)
3. (Australia) Rennae Stubbs / (United States) Jim Grabb (first round)
4. (Croatia) Mirjana Lučić / (India) Mahesh Bhupathi (second round)
5. (Latvia) Larisa Neiland / (United States) Rick Leach (second round)
6. (United States) Katrina Adams / (India) Leander Paes (first round)
7. (Ukraine) Elena Tatarkova / (Czech Republic) Cyril Suk (second round)
8. (United States) Lisa Raymond / (United States) Patrick Galbraith (first round)

== Draw ==
Key

- Q = Qualifier
- WC = Wild card
- LL = Lucky loser
- Alt = Alternate
- ITF = ITF entry
- PR = Protected ranking
- SR = Special ranking
- SE = Special exempt
- JE = Junior exempt
- JR = Junior Accelerator Programme entrant
- CO = College Accelerator Programme entrant
- NG = Next Gen Accelerator Program entrant
- w/o = Walkover
- r = Retired
- d = Defaulted

=== Finals ===
Semifinals
(Netherlands) Manon Bollegraf (Argentina) Pablo Albano	4	4
WC	(United States) Serena Williams (Belarus) Max Mirnyi	6	6
(United States) Debbie Graham (South Africa) Ellis Ferreira	6	2	1
(South Africa) Mariaan de Swardt (South Africa) David Adams	2	6	6

Final
WC	(United States) Serena Williams (Belarus) Max Mirnyi	4	6	6^{5}
(South Africa) Mariaan de Swardt (South Africa) David Adams	6	4	7^{7}

=== Top half ===
First round
1	(Netherlands) C Vis (Netherlands) P Haarhuis	3	2
(Netherlands) M Bollegraf (Argentina) P Albano	6	6
(Australia) K Kunce (United States) F Montana	4	3
(Japan) A Sugiyama (Australia) P Tramacchi	6	6
PR	(United States) L Wild (Mexico) D Roditi	4	6	7
(South Africa) A Coetzer (United Kingdom) N Broad	6	2	5
(Netherlands) M Oremans (Sweden) N Kulti	7^{7}	6
8	(United States) L Raymond (United States) P Galbraith	6^{3}	1
3	(Australia) R Stubbs (United States) J Grabb	1	6^{2}
WC	(United States) S Williams (Belarus) M Mirnyi	6	7^{7}
(Russia) E Likhovtseva (United States) J Tarango	6	6
(Argentina) F Labat (Argentina) D Orsanic	3	4
WC	(Australia) L McShea (Australia) T Woodbridge	7^{7}	6
(Indonesia) Y Basuki (Netherlands) T Kempers	6^{3}	2
(Belgium) E Callens (South Africa) C Haggard	7^{7}	6
6	(United States) K Adams (India) L Paes	6^{2}	3

Second round
(Netherlands) M Bollegraf (Argentina) P Albano	6	6
(Japan) A Sugiyama (Australia) P Tramacchi	3	4
PR	(United States) L Wild (Mexico) D Roditi	3	2
(Netherlands) M Oremans (Sweden) N Kulti	6	6
WC	(United States) S Williams (Belarus) M Mirnyi	6	6
(Russia) E Likhovtseva (United States) J Tarango	4	4
WC	(Australia) L McShea (Australia) T Woodbridge	6	3	3
(Belgium) E Callens (South Africa) C Haggard	2	6	6

Quarterfinals
(Netherlands) M Bollegraf (Argentina) P Albano	6^{5}	7	6
(Netherlands) M Oremans (Sweden) N Kulti	7^{7}	5	4
WC	(United States) S Williams (Belarus) M Mirnyi	6	6
(Belgium) E Callens (South Africa) C Haggard	3	4

Semifinals
(Netherlands) M Bollegraf (Argentina) P Albano	4	4
WC	(United States) S Williams (Belarus) M Mirnyi	6	6

=== Bottom half ===
First round
5	(Latvia) L Neiland (United States) R Leach	4	6	7^{7}
(Australia) K-A Guse (Australia) W Arthurs	6	3	6^{5}
(United States) D Graham (South Africa) E Ferreira	6	6
(Argentina) P Suárez (Argentina) M Hood	3	4
(Australia) C Barclay (Australia) A Florent	3	6	0
(United States) K Po (United States) D Johnson	6	3	6
(Austria) K Kschwendt (Czech Republic) M Damm	6	5	5
4	(Croatia) M Lučić (India) M Bhupathi	2	7	7
7	(Ukraine) E Tatarkova (Czech Republic) C Suk	6	5	6
WC	(Australia) A Molik (Australia) J Eagle	1	7	0
(Argentina) P Tarabini (South Africa) J-L de Jager	2	3
(South Africa) M de Swardt (South Africa) D Adams	6	6
(Australia) N Pratt (South Africa) K Ullyett	2	6	6
WC	(Australia) J Dokić (Australia) M Tebbutt	6	4	1
(Australia) R McQuillan (Australia) D Macpherson	7^{7}	6
2	(Russia) A Kournikova (The Bahamas) M Knowles	6^{5}	4

Second round
5	(Latvia) L Neiland (United States) R Leach	4	6	4
(United States) D Graham (South Africa) E Ferreira	6	2	6
(United States) K Po (United States) D Johnson	6^{3}	6	7^{7}
4	(Croatia) M Lučić (India) M Bhupathi	7^{7}	2	6^{1}
7	(Ukraine) E Tatarkova (Czech Republic) C Suk	5	4
(South Africa) M de Swardt (South Africa) D Adams	7	6
(Australia) N Pratt (South Africa) K Ullyett	6^{3}	3
(Australia) R McQuillan (Australia) D Macpherson	7^{7}	6

Quarterfinals
(United States) D Graham (South Africa) E Ferreira	7^{7}	6
(United States) K Po (United States) D Johnson	6^{4}	1
(South Africa) M de Swardt (South Africa) D Adams	6	6
(Australia) R McQuillan (Australia) D Macpherson	4	4

Semifinals
(United States) D Graham (South Africa) E Ferreira	6	2	1
(South Africa) M de Swardt (South Africa) D Adams	2	6	6
