= 1999 Australian Open – Women's singles =

Women's singles
- 1999 Australian Open

Final
- Champion: (Switzerland) Martina Hingis
- Runner-up: (France) Amélie Mauresmo
- Score: 6–2, 6–3

Details
- Draw: 128
- Seeds: 16

Events
Singles	men	women		boys	girls
Doubles	men	women	mixed	boys	girls
WC Singles	men	women	quad
WC Doubles	men	women	quad
Legends	men	women	mixed
- Australian Open

Two-time defending champion Martina Hingis defeated Amélie Mauresmo in the final, 6–2, 6–3 to win the women's singles tennis title at the 1999 Australian Open. It was her third Australian Open singles title and fifth and last major singles title overall. With the win, 18-year-old Hingis joined Margaret Court, Evonne Goolagong, Steffi Graf, and Monica Seles as the only women to win three consecutive Australian Open titles, and remains the youngest to do so. Hingis also became the only woman to win three consecutive Australian Open titles in singles and doubles simultaneously.

This tournament marked future world No. 1 Mauresmo's first major final, and the first time she progressed past the third round of a major. It would be her only major final until 2006, despite being one of the top players of the early 2000s.

Prior to her semifinal defeat to Hingis, Seles was undefeated in 33 matches at the Australian Open, dating back to her tournament debut in 1991, the longest undefeated winning streak at one tournament by a woman in the Open Era.

This was the last Australian Open appearance for four-time champion Graf, who was defeated by Seles in the quarterfinals.

== Seeds ==
1. (United States) Lindsay Davenport (semifinals)
2. (Switzerland) Martina Hingis (champion)
3. (Czech Republic) Jana Novotná (third round)
4. (Spain) Arantxa Sánchez Vicario (second round)
5. (United States) Venus Williams (quarterfinals)
6. (United States) Monica Seles (semifinals)
7. (France) Mary Pierce (quarterfinals)
8. (Switzerland) Patty Schnyder (second round)
9. (Spain) Conchita Martínez (third round)
10. (Germany) Steffi Graf (quarterfinals)
11. (Belgium) Dominique Van Roost (quarterfinals)
12. (Russia) Anna Kournikova (fourth round)
13. (Romania) Irina Spîrlea (first round)
14. (France) Sandrine Testud (fourth round)
15. (Belarus) Natasha Zvereva (third round)
16. (South Africa) Amanda Coetzer (fourth round)

Click on the seed number of a player to go to their draw section.

== Draw ==
Key

- Q = Qualifier
- WC = Wild card
- LL = Lucky loser
- Alt = Alternate
- ITF = ITF entry
- PR = Protected ranking
- SR = Special ranking
- SE = Special exempt
- JE = Junior exempt
- JR = Junior Accelerator Programme entrant
- CO = College Accelerator Programme entrant
- NG = Next Gen Accelerator Program entrant
- w/o = Walkover
- r = Retired
- d = Defaulted

=== Finals ===
Quarterfinals
1	(United States) Lindsay Davenport	6	6
5	(United States) Venus Williams	4	0
11	(Belgium) Dominique Van Roost	3	6^{3}
(France) Amélie Mauresmo	6	7^{7}
6	(United States) Monica Seles	7	6
10	(Germany) Steffi Graf	5	1
7	(France) Mary Pierce	3	4
2	(Switzerland) Martina Hingis	6	6

Semifinals
1	(United States) Lindsay Davenport	6	5	5
(France) Amélie Mauresmo	4	7	7
6	(United States) Monica Seles	2	4
2	(Switzerland) Martina Hingis	6	6

Final
(France) Amélie Mauresmo	2	3
2	(Switzerland) Martina Hingis	6	6

=== Top half ===
==== Section 1 ====
First round
1	(United States) L Davenport	6	6
(Spain) G León García	2	2
(Argentina) F Labat	3	6	6
(Indonesia) Y Basuki	6	2	1
WC	(South Korea) S-h Park	0	7	1
(Slovakia) K Habšudová	6	5	6
(United States) L Raymond	6	2	4
(France) L Ghirardi	3	6	6
(Belgium) L Courtois	2	6	1
WC	(Australia) R McQuillan	6	3	6
Q	(Canada) M Drake	7^{7}	6^{5}	6
(Japan) Y Yoshida	6^{5}	7^{7}	4
(Czech Republic) K Hrdličková	3	4
(Austria) S Plischke	6	6
(Germany) A Huber	7	6
13	(Romania) I Spîrlea	5	4

Second round
1	(United States) L Davenport	6	6
(Argentina) F Labat	2	1
(Slovakia) K Habšudová	6^{3}	6	6
(France) L Ghirardi	7^{7}	4	3
WC	(Australia) R McQuillan	6^{2}	6	2
Q	(Canada) M Drake	7^{7}	4	6
(Austria) S Plischke	6^{7}	6	7
(Germany) A Huber	7^{9}	3	5

Third round
1	(United States) L Davenport	6	6
(Slovakia) K Habšudová	0	4
Q	(Canada) M Drake	6	6
(Austria) S Plischke	2	2

Fourth round
1	(United States) L Davenport	6	6
Q	(Canada) M Drake	1	3

==== Section 2 ====
First round
15	(Belarus) N Zvereva	6	7
(Slovakia) K Studeníková	3	5
(United States) K Po	2	2
PR	(United States) M Tu	6	6
(United States) C Rubin	6	6
(Germany) M Weingärtner	1	2
(Greece) C Papadáki	6	4	2
(Germany) E Wagner	4	6	6
(United States) K Miller	2	2
(Romania) R Dragomir	6	6
WC	(Australia) A Ellwood	0	6	2
(United States) J Chi	6	4	6
(Spain) C Torrens Valero	6	3	4
(Sweden) Å Carlsson	2	6	6
(Croatia) S Talaja	6	3	7
5	(United States) V Williams	3	6	9

Second round
15	(Belarus) N Zvereva	6	7
PR	(United States) M Tu	3	5
(United States) C Rubin	4	7^{7}	6
(Germany) E Wagner	6	6^{4}	2
(Romania) R Dragomir	6	6
(United States) J Chi	1	2
(Sweden) Å Carlsson	2	1
5	(United States) V Williams	6	6

Third round
15	(Belarus) N Zvereva	6^{3}	6	4
(United States) C Rubin	7^{7}	4	6
(Romania) R Dragomir	3	4
5	(United States) V Williams	6	6

Fourth round
(United States) C Rubin	6^{3}	4
5	(United States) V Williams	7^{7}	6

==== Section 3 ====
First round
3	(Czech Republic) J Novotná	6	6
(France) A-G Sidot	4	2
(Slovakia) H Nagyová	6^{4}	7	6
(Netherlands) K Boogert	7^{7}	5	4
(United States) J Capriati	5	6	8
WC	(Australia) E Dominikovic	7	3	6
(United States) S Cacic	2	3^{r}
(Spain) M Sánchez Lorenzo	6	3
(Zimbabwe) C Black	4	2
(Romania) C Cristea	6	6
(Canada) J Nejedly	6	6
(Bulgaria) P Stoyanova	1	0
(Netherlands) S Noorlander	7	6
(Netherlands) M Oremans	5	0
Q	(Russia) N Petrova	3	4
11	(Belgium) D Van Roost	6	6

Second round
3	(Czech Republic) J Novotná	6	2	6
(Slovakia) H Nagyová	4	6	3
(United States) J Capriati	6^{2}	2
(Spain) M Sánchez Lorenzo	7^{7}	6
(Romania) C Cristea	7	3	1
(Canada) J Nejedly	5	6	6
(Netherlands) S Noorlander	6^{6}	0
11	(Belgium) D Van Roost	7^{8}	6

Third round
3	(Czech Republic) J Novotná	3	0
(Spain) M Sánchez Lorenzo	6	6
(Canada) J Nejedly	1	1
11	(Belgium) D Van Roost	6	6

Fourth round
(Spain) M Sánchez Lorenzo	2	3
11	(Belgium) D Van Roost	6	6

==== Section 4 ====
First round
9	(Spain) C Martínez	6	6
(Czech Republic) A Gerši	3	3
(France) N Dechy	6^{2}	3
(United States) B Rippner	7^{7}	6
(Israel) A Smashnova	6	6
(Ukraine) E Tatarkova	4	1
(France) É Loit	6	6
(Croatia) M Lučić	2	1
(Australia) N Pratt	7	6
(Venezuela) M Vento	5	1
(United Kingdom) S Smith	6	6
(Latvia) L Neiland	0	3
(United States) C Morariu	7^{7}	6^{8}	2
(France) A Mauresmo	6^{2}	7^{10}	6
Q	(United States) E deLone	3	6	4
8	(Switzerland) P Schnyder	6	3	6

Second round
9	(Spain) C Martínez	6	6
(United States) B Rippner	0	4
(Israel) A Smashnova	6	2	2
(France) É Loit	1	6	6
(Australia) N Pratt	6	6
(United Kingdom) S Smith	4	4
(France) A Mauresmo	6^{1}	6	6
8	(Switzerland) P Schnyder	7^{7}	4	3

Third round
9	(Spain) C Martínez	5	1
(France) É Loit	7	6
(Australia) N Pratt	3	3
(France) A Mauresmo	6	6

Fourth round
(France) É Loit	0	5
(France) A Mauresmo	6	7

=== Bottom half ===
==== Section 5 ====
First round
6	(United States) M Seles	6	6
Q	(Slovenia) T Križan	1	0
(Czech Republic) D Chládková	4	2
(France) A Dechaume-Balleret	6	6
(Italy) A Serra Zanetti	6	6
(Argentina) M Díaz Oliva	1	2
(Belgium) S Appelmans	6	6
(Spain) C Martínez Granados	0	2
(France) S Pitkowski	4	6^{2}
(Spain) M Serna	6	7^{7}
(United States) S Williams	6	6
(Romania) R Sandu	2	3
(Chinese Taipei) S-t Wang	2	3
(Belgium) E Callens	6	6
(United States) T Snyder	3	2
14	(France) S Testud	6	6

Second round
6	(United States) M Seles	6	6
(France) A Dechaume-Balleret	1	4
(Italy) A Serra Zanetti	3	1
(Belgium) S Appelmans	6	6
(Spain) M Serna	1	3
(United States) S Williams	6	6
(Belgium) E Callens	3	1
14	(France) S Testud	6	6

Third round
6	(United States) M Seles	6	3	6
(Belgium) S Appelmans	3	6	4
(United States) S Williams	2	6	7
14	(France) S Testud	6	2	9

Fourth round
6	(United States) M Seles	6	6
14	(France) S Testud	0	3

==== Section 6 ====
First round
10	(Germany) S Graf	6	6
(Argentina) P Suárez	0	3
(United States) M Shaughnessy	3	2
(Austria) B Schwartz	6	6
(Italy) L Golarsa	1	0
(United States) MJ Fernández	6	6
(United States) A Frazier	6	4	6
(Japan) A Sugiyama	3	6	4
(Czech Republic) R Bobková	0	3
(Spain) V Ruano Pascual	6	6
(Russia) E Likhovtseva	6	6
(Japan) N Miyagi	2	2
(Austria) B Schett	6	6
(Germany) J Kandarr	4	0
(South Africa) M de Swardt	2	2
4	(Spain) A Sánchez Vicario	6	6

Second round
10	(Germany) S Graf	4	6	6
(Austria) B Schwartz	6	1	2
(United States) MJ Fernández	4	7	6
(United States) A Frazier	6	5	3
(Spain) V Ruano Pascual	2	3
(Russia) E Likhovtseva	6	6
(Austria) B Schett	6	6
4	(Spain) A Sánchez Vicario	2	2

Third round
10	(Germany) S Graf	4	6	6
(United States) MJ Fernández	6	3	4
(Russia) E Likhovtseva	4	4
(Austria) B Schett	6	6

Fourth round
10	(Germany) S Graf	6	6
(Austria) B Schett	1	1

==== Section 7 ====
First round
7	(France) M Pierce	6	6
WC	(Australia) C Watson	2	1
(Luxembourg) A Kremer	6	6
WC	(Australia) C Barclay	3	2
(Hungary) R Kuti-Kis	5	4
(China) F Li	7	6
(Italy) T Garbin	7^{7}	0	7
(Italy) R Grande	6^{3}	6	9
(Italy) S Farina	6	5	4
(Germany) A Glass	4	7	6
(Russia) T Panova	7	7^{7}
(Thailand) T Tanasugarn	5	6^{4}
(Canada) S Jeyaseelan	3	0
(Japan) M Saeki	6	6
Q	(United States) J Craybas	6^{1}	5
12	(Russia) A Kournikova	7^{7}	7

Second round
7	(France) M Pierce	6	6
(Luxembourg) A Kremer	2	1
(China) F Li	2	4
(Italy) R Grande	6	6
(Germany) A Glass	7	6^{2}	7
(Russia) T Panova	5	7^{7}	5
(Japan) M Saeki	6	4	8
12	(Russia) A Kournikova	1	6	10

Third round
7	(France) M Pierce	6	6
(Italy) R Grande	2	2
(Germany) A Glass	6	2	3
12	(Russia) A Kournikova	4	6	6

Fourth round
7	(France) M Pierce	6	6
12	(Russia) A Kournikova	0	4

==== Section 8 ====
First round
16	(South Africa) A Coetzer	6	2	7
Q	(Czech Republic) S Kleinová	4	6	5
(France) J Halard-Decugis	6	3	6
WC	(Australia) A Molik	4	6	3
(Chinese Taipei) J Lee	6	6
Q	(Czech Republic) L Němečková	0	2
(Italy) F Perfetti	5	3
(United States) S Reeves	7	6
(Russia) E Makarova	3	7	4
WC	(Australia) J Dokić	6	5	6
(United States) K Brandi	6	6
(France) A Cocheteux	1	1
Q	(Russia) E Dementieva	6	6
(Italy) G Pizzichini	3	4
(United States) L Osterloh	1	2
2	(Switzerland) M Hingis	6	6

Second round
16	(South Africa) A Coetzer	4	7	6
(France) J Halard-Decugis	6	5	4
(Chinese Taipei) J Lee	7	6
(United States) S Reeves	5	1
WC	(Australia) J Dokić	6	7
(United States) K Brandi	4	5
Q	(Russia) E Dementieva	3	2
2	(Switzerland) M Hingis	6	6

Third round
16	(South Africa) A Coetzer	6	7
(Chinese Taipei) J Lee	3	5
WC	(Australia) J Dokić	1	2
2	(Switzerland) M Hingis	6	6

Fourth round
16	(South Africa) A Coetzer	3	7^{7}	1
2	(Switzerland) M Hingis	6	6^{4}	6

Preceded by 1998 US Open – Women's singles	Grand Slam women's singles	Succeeded by 1999 French Open – Women's singles
