= Wayne Wong =

Wayne Wong may refer to:

- Wayne Wong (tennis)
- Wayne Wong (skier)

== See also ==
- Wayne Wang, film director
