= Michal Navrátil (tennis) =

Czech tennis player

- Full name: Michal Navrátil
- Country (sports): Czech Republic
- Born: 20 November 1982 (age 42); Přerov, Czechoslovakia
- Plays: Left-handed
- Prize money: $70,498

Singles
- Highest ranking: No. 274 (21 August 2006)

Doubles
- Highest ranking: No. 207 (10 November 2003)

Michal Navrátil (born 20 November 1982) is a Czech tennis coach and a former professional player.

== Personal life ==
Born in Přerov, he is the son of former player and later Davis Cup captain Jaroslav Navrátil. As a youngster the left-hander trained at the National Tennis Centre in Moravia. He and Ladislav Chramosta made the 1999 Australian Open boys' doubles final, which they lost in three sets to Kristian Pless and Jürgen Melzer.

== Professional career ==
As a professional player he won seven Futures titles in singles but didn't have success on the Challenger circuit. In doubles however he won three Challenger events, as well as 14 Futures titles. He had one main draw entry on the ATP Tour, when he and Tomáš Berdych were given a wildcard for the doubles at the Campionati Internazionali di Sicilia in 2005, but the pair had to withdraw before the match. This handed a walkover win to third seeds Martín García and Mariano Hood, who went on to win the tournament.

== Coaching career ==
Navrátil is now based in Prostějov and like his father is involved in coaching. He was a member of Tomáš Berdych's travelling team for many years as his practise partner. Players coached include Jiří Veselý and currently Adam Pavlásek, Jiří Lehečka, who made it into the world's top 100 rankings under his tutelage.

== Challenger titles ==
=== Doubles: (3) ===
No.	Year	Tournament	Surface	Partner	Opponents	Score
1.	2001	Prague, Czech Republic	Clay	(Czech Republic) Jaroslav Levinský	(Israel) Noam Behr (Israel) Andy Ram	6–3, 6–1
2.	2003	Prague, Czech Republic	Clay	(Czech Republic) Tomáš Berdych	(Argentina) Martín García (Argentina) Sebastián Prieto	6–4, 3–6, 6–4
3.	2006	Geneva, Switzerland	Clay	(Russia) Yuri Schukin	(Greece) Konstantinos Economidis (Croatia) Lovro Zovko	1–6, 6–2, 10–6
