= 2000 ITF Men's Circuit =

Men's World Tennis Tour season

Details
- Duration: 10 January 2000 – 27 December 2000
- Edition: 18th Satellite; 3rd Futures
- Tournaments: 39 Satellite circuits 249 Futures tournaments
- Categories: $15,000 tournaments $10,000 tournaments

Achievements (singles)

The 2000 ITF Men's Circuit was the 2000 edition of the third-tier tour for men's professional tennis. In 2000 there were 39 Satellite Circuits for men in 21 countries and 249 Futures tournaments for men in 55 countries. Each Satellite Circuit and Futures tournament was organised and run by the National Association of the country in which the event took place.

== ITF Satellite circuits ==
Each Satellite Circuit comprises three tournaments plus a Masters playoff at which prize money and ranking points are awarded. Below are listed the winners of each Satellite Circuit, with the ATP Tour ranking points won (based on the total number of circuit points during the tour weeks).

=== Circuits ===
Legend
$25,000 + H tournaments
$25,000 tournaments

==== January–March ====
Week of	Circuit	Value	Singles Winner	Points	Doubles Winners	Points
January 3	Central America; Results	$25,000	(Germany) Alexander Waske	33	(Israel) Oren Motevassel (Germany) Alexander Waske	34
January 10	Spain I Results	$25,000	(Spain) David Sánchez	33	(Spain) Eduardo Nicolás (Spain) Germán Puentes	33
January 17	Egypt I Results	$25,000	(France) Dimitri Lorin	33	(Slovenia) Iztok Božič (Slovenia) Marko Tkalec	29
January 24	Switzerland I Results	$25,000	(Belgium) Arnaud Fontaine / (Austria) Luben Pampoulov	31	(Belgium) Arnaud Fontaine (France) Jean-Michel Pequery	33
February 7	Spain II	$25,000	(Spain) Eduardo Nicolás / (Spain) Germán Puentes	43	(Spain) Eduardo Nicolás (Spain) Germán Puentes	45
February 14	Cuba/Mexico	$25,000	(Brazil) Ricardo Mello	33	(Netherlands) Bobbie Altelaar (Netherlands) Rogier Wassen	28
February 21	Australia I	$25,000 H	(Bosnia and Herzegovina) Kristian Capalik / (Australia) Josh Tuckfield	43	(Australia) Matthew Breen (Australia) Lee Pearson	43
February 28	Greece I	$25,000	(Israel) Lior Mor	33	(Germany) Julián Kreitz (Austria) Alexander Peya	34
March 6	Spain III	$25,000	(Spain) David Caballero	27	(Spain) Juan Giner (Spain) Emilio Viuda-Hernandez	34
March 13	Italy I	$25,000	(Argentina) Marcelo Charpentier	35	(United States) Brian Cummings (United States) Wade McGuire	30
March 20	Croatia I	$25,000	(Finland) Kim Tiilikainen	29	(Slovakia) Tomáš Čatár (Slovakia) Branislav Sekáč	29
March 20	Egypt II	$25,000	(Romania) Remus Farcas	33	(Egypt) Amr Ghoneim (Egypt) Karim Maamoun	34
March 27	Australia II	$25,000 H	(Australia) Scott Draper	43	(Australia) Matthew Breen (Australia) Lee Pearson	46

==== April–June ====
Week of	Circuit	Value	Singles Winner	Points	Doubles Winners	Points
April 9	Italy II	$25,000	(Spain) Óscar Hernández	29	(Spain) Óscar Hernández (France) Julien Jeanpierre	35
April 10	Spain IV	$25,000	(Spain) Óscar Martínez	20	(Spain) Juan Giner (Spain) Emilio Viuda-Hernandez	33
April 17	Croatia II	$25,000	(Croatia) Ivan Beroš	33	(Italy) Uros Vico (Netherlands) Rogier Wassen	29
April 24	Portugal I	$25,000	(Portugal) Bernardo Mota / (United States) Rodolfo Rake	33	(Czech Republic) Martin Bartonek (Portugal) João Cunha e Silva	33
April 24	Turkey I	$25,000	(United Kingdom) Miles Maclagan	35	(Bosnia and Herzegovina) Igor Ibrisbegović (Ukraine) Orest Tereshchuk	32
May 8	Bulgaria	$25,000	(Spain) Roberto Menendez	33	(Germany) Markus Menzler (Germany) Markus Wislsperger	34
May 8	Spain V	$25,000	(Spain) Miguel Ángel López Jaén / (Spain) Mario Munoz-Bejarano	33	(Spain) Miguel Ángel López Jaén (Spain) Emilio Viuda-Hernandez	31
May 29	Turkey II	$25,000	(Azerbaijan) Emin Ağayev	33	(Australia) Ashley Ford (France) Anthony La Porte	36
June 5	India I	$25,000	(Thailand) Danai Udomchoke	36	(India) Vikrant Chadha (United States) Kunj Majmudar	33
June 5	SouthAfrica/Mauritius	$25,000	(South Africa) Wesley Moodie	36	(South Africa) Wesley Moodie (South Africa) Shaun Rudman	34
June 12	Netherlands I	$25,000 H	(Argentina) Daniel Caracciolo	43	(Argentina) Daniel Caracciolo (Argentina) Miguel Pastura	43
June 12	Argentina I	$25,000	(Uruguay) Pablo Bianchi	24	(Argentina) Edgardo Massa (Argentina) Leonardo Olguín	33
June 19	Italy III	$25,000 H	(Italy) Elia Grossi	43	(Italy) Diego Álvarez (Italy) Nahuel Fracassi	43

==== July–October ====
Week of	Circuit	Value	Singles Winner	Points	Doubles Winners	Points
July	No tournaments scheduled.					
August 21	Italy IV	$25,000	(Italy) Filippo Messori	36	(Italy) Riccardo Ciruolo (Italy) Filippo Messori	28
August 21	Slovakia I	$25,000	(Czech Republic) Tomáš Cakl	33	(Slovakia) Branislav Sekáč (Czech Republic) Radek Štěpánek	34
August 21	West Africa	$25,000	(Ghana) Gunther Darkey	34	(United States) Marcus Fluitt (United States) Kiantki Thomas	33
August 21	Yugoslavia I	$25,000	(Federal Republic of Yugoslavia) Relja Dulić Fišer / (Federal Republic of Yugoslavia) Vladimir Pavićević	33	(Hungary) Zoltán Böröczky (Federal Republic of Yugoslavia) Relja Dulić Fišer	34
August 28	Switzerland II	$25,000	(Croatia) Ivan Beroš	33	(South Africa) Andrew Anderson (Australia) Kane Dewhurst	33
September 11	Egypt III	$25,000	(Egypt) Karim Maamoun	36	(Egypt) Amr Ghoneim (Egypt) Karim Maamoun	34
September 11	USA I	$25,000	(Spain) Miguel Ángel López Jaén / (United States) Jack Brasington	33	(United States) Levar Harper-Griffith (United States) Robert Kendrick	32
October 1	Australia III	$25,000 H	(Australia) Alun Jones	38	(Australia) Stephen Huss (Australia) Lee Pearson	45
October 1	Italy V	$25,000	(Belgium) Stefan Wauters	33	(Italy) Filippo Messori (Italy) Davide Scala	35
October 9	Portugal II	$25,000	(Portugal) Emanuel Couto	34	(Portugal) Nuno Marques (Portugal) António van Grichen	34
October 16	Spain VI	$25,000	(Spain) Didac Pérez	34	(Spain) Carlos Rexach-Itoiz (Spain) Gabriel Trujillo Soler	32
October 16	South Africa	$25,000	(Austria) Zbynek Mlynarik	33	(Canada) Andrew Nisker (United States) Tripp Phillips	33
October 16	Switzerland III	$25,000	(Switzerland) Christian Dillschneider	33	(Switzerland) Marco Chiudinelli (Japan) Jun Kato	33

== ITF Futures ==
Single-week Futures tournaments were played for the third time in 2000, having been established in 1998.

=== Point distribution ===
Tournament Category	W	F	SF	QF	R16	R32
Futures 15,000+H	24	16	8	4	1	0
Futures 15,000	18	12	6	3	1	0
Futures 10,000+H	18	12	6	3	1	0
Futures 10,000	12	8	4	2	1	0

== Events ==
Legend
$15,000 tournaments
$10,000 tournaments

=== January ===
Date	Tournament	City	Surface	Singles champions	Doubles champions
10–16 January	USA F1	Pembroke Pines, Florida $15,000	Hard	(Israel) Harel Levy	(South Africa) Gareth Williams (United States) Jeff Williams
10–16 January	France F1	Grasse $10,000 H	Clay (i)	(Belgium) Filip Dewulf	(Spain) Juan Gisbert Schultze (Spain) Marcos Roy-Girardi
10–16 January	India F1	Secunderabad $10,000	Clay	(Slovakia) Ladislav Švarc	(India) Saurav Panja (India) Srinath Prahlad
17–23 January	USA F2	Altamonte Springs, Florida $15,000	Hard	(Israel) Eyal Erlich	(Israel) Jonathan Erlich (Israel) Harel Levy
17–23 January	France F2	Angers $10,000 H	Clay (i)	(Hungary) Norbert Mazány	(Belgium) Olivier Rochus (Belgium) Réginald Willems
17–23 January	India F2	Bangalore $10,000	Clay	(Israel) Kobi Ziv	(Israel) Andy Ram (Israel) Nir Welgreen
24–29 January	India F3	Madras $10,000	Hard	(Israel) Andy Ram	(Israel) Andy Ram (Israel) Nir Welgreen
24–30 January	USA F3	Boca Raton, Florida $15,000	Hard	(Georgia (country)) Irakli Labadze	(South Africa) Gareth Williams (United States) Jeff Williams
24–30 January	France F3	Feucherolles $10,000 H	Clay (i)	(France) Charles Auffray	(Belgium) Olivier Rochus (Belgium) Réginald Willems

=== February ===
Date	Tournament	City	Surface	Singles champions	Doubles champions
31 Jan–6 February	Great Britain F1	Eastbourne $15,000	Carpet (i)	(Norway) Helge Koll-Frafjord	(Sweden) Henrik Andersson (Norway) Helge Koll-Frafjord
31 Jan–6 February	France F4	Deauville $10,000	Clay (i)	(France) Charles Auffray	(Spain) Juan Gisbert Schultze (Spain) Marcos Roy-Girardi
7–13 February	Great Britain F2	Chigwell $15,000	Carpet (i)	(Belgium) Gilles Elseneer	(United Kingdom) James Davidson (Sweden) Fredrik Lovén
14–20 February	Croatia F1	Zagreb $15,000	Hard (i)	(Czech Republic) Jan Vacek	(Croatia) Ivica Ančić (Croatia) Mario Ančić
14–20 February	USA F4	Corpus Christi, Texas $15,000	Hard	(Argentina) Damián Furmanski	(Canada) Bobby Kokavec (Argentina) Cristian Kordasz
21–27 February	Croatia F1	Zagreb $15,000	Hard (i)	(Croatia) Mario Ančić	(Croatia) Ivo Karlović (Austria) Clemens Trimmel
21–27 February	Indonesia F1	Jakarta $15,000	Hard	(Austria) Zbynek Mlynarik	(Indonesia) Sulistyo Wibowo (Indonesia) Bonit Wiryawan
21–27 February	Chile F1	Osorno $10,000	Clay	(Argentina) Rodrigo Cerdera	(Brazil) Adriano Ferreira (Brazil) Flávio Saretta
21–28 February	USA F5	Montgomery, Texas $15,000	Hard	(Brazil) Daniel Melo	(Brazil) Daniel Melo (Brazil) Leandro Rosa

=== March ===
Date	Tournament	City	Surface	Singles champions	Doubles champions
28 Feb–5 March	Indonesia F2	Jakarta $15,000	Hard	(South Korea) Yoon Yong-il	(Czech Republic) František Čermák (Czech Republic) Roman Kukal
28 Feb–5 March	USA F6	San Antonio, Texas $15,000	Hard	(United States) Taylor Dent	(United States) Keith Brill (United States) Cory Guy
28 Feb–5 March	Chile F2	Temuco $10,000	Clay	(Argentina) Guillermo Coria	(Argentina) Eduardo Medica (Argentina) Sergio Roitman
6–12 March	Chile F3	Santiago $10,000	Clay	(Brazil) Alexandre Simoni	(Argentina) Eduardo Medica (Argentina) Sergio Roitman
13–19 March	France F6	Douai $15,000 H	Carpet (i)	(Croatia) Ivo Karlović	(Belgium) Gilles Elseneer (Belgium) Arnaud Fontaine
13–19 March	Argentina F1	Mendoza $10,000	Clay	(Argentina) Diego Moyano	(Italy) Enzo Artoni (Argentina) Andrés Schneiter
13–19 March	Japan F1	Takamori $10,000	Carpet	(Japan) Takahiro Terachi	(United States) Michael Jessup (United States) Minh Le
13–19 March	Japan F2	Shirako $10,000	Carpet	(United States) Scott Barron	(United States) Scott Barron (Finland) Jarkko Nieminen
20–26 March	France F7	Poitiers $15,000 H	Carpet (i)	(Austria) Julian Knowle	(France) Maxime Boyé (Croatia) Ivo Karlović
20–26 March	Argentina F2	Córdoba $10,000	Clay	(Argentina) Mariano Delfino	(Brazil) Márcio Carlsson (Brazil) Ricardo Schlachter

=== April ===
Date	Tournament	City	Surface	Singles champions	Doubles champions
27 March–2 April	France F8	Melun $15,000 H	Carpet	(Austria) Julian Knowle	(Germany) Andreas Tattermüsch (Germany) Andreas Weber
27 March–2 April	USA F7	Mobile, Alabama $15,000	Hard	(Argentina) Damián Furmanski	(Germany) Jan Boruszewski (Germany) Alexander Waske
27 March–2 April	Argentina F3	Santa Fe $10,000	Clay	(Argentina) Guillermo Coria	(Argentina) Francisco Cabello (Argentina) Marcello Wowk
27 March–2 April	Japan F3	Isawa $10,000	Clay	(Japan) Takahiro Terachi	(Japan) Takao Suzuki (Japan) Takahiro Terachi
3–9 April	USA F8	Little Rock, Arkansas $15,000	Hard	(Sweden) Marcus Sarstrand	(Australia) Grant Doyle (Canada) Frédéric Niemeyer
3–9 April	France F9	Clermont-Ferrand $10,000 H	Carpet	(Germany) Daniel Elsner	(United Kingdom) James Davidson (Sweden) Robert Lindstedt
10–16 April	USA F9	Mt Pleasant, South Carolina $15,000	Hard	(Argentina) Damián Furmanski	(United States) Gavin Sontag (Canada) Jerry Turek
10–16 April	France F10	Saint-Brieuc $10,000 H	Clay	(Germany) Daniel Elsner	(France) Sébastien de Chaunac (France) Olivier Patience
17–23 April	USA F10	Elkin, North Carolina $15,000	Hard	(United States) Glenn Weiner	(United States) Wynn Criswell (South Africa) Shaun Rudman
17–23 April	Chile F4	Sandiago $10,000	Clay	(Argentina) Sergio Roitman	(Brazil) Adriano Ferreira (Brazil) Flávio Saretta
24–30 April	Algeria F1	Algiers $15,000	Clay	(Spain) Albert Montañés	(Spain) Pedro Nieto (Spain) Javier Pérez Vázquez
24–29 April	Germany F1	Riemerling $15,000	Hard	(Germany) Daniel Elsner	(Czech Republic) Radek Štěpánek (Czech Republic) Radomír Vašek
24–30 April	China F1	Chengdu $15,000	Hard	(China) Zhu Benqiang	(Japan) Tasuku Iwami (Japan) Takahiro Terachi
24–30 April	Great Britain F3	Bournemouth $15,000	Clay	(France) Olivier Mutis	(United Kingdom) James Davidson (Finland) Ville Liukko
24–30 April	Uzbekistan F1	Andijan $15,000	Hard	(Israel) Lior Dahan	(Israel) Jonathan Erlich (Israel) Lior Mor
24–30 April	Chile F5	Sandiago $10,000	Clay	(Colombia) Mauricio Hadad	(Argentina) Juan Pablo Guzmán (Argentina) Edgardo Massa

=== May ===
Date	Tournament	City	Surface	Singles champions	Doubles champions
1–7 May	Algeria F2	Algiers $15,000	Clay	(Spain) Albert Montañés	(Spain) Pedro Nieto (Spain) Javier Pérez Vázquez
1–7 May	China F2	Chengdu $15,000	Hard	(New Zealand) Mark Nielsen	(United States) Doug Bohaboy (United States) Alex Witt
1–7 May	Germany F2	Esslingen $15,000	Clay	(Norway) Jan Frode Andersen	(Lebanon) Ali Hamadeh (Lebanon) Jicham Zaatini
1–7 May	Great Britain F4	Hatfield $15,000	Clay	(France) Olivier Mutis	(Puerto Rico) José Frontera (Romania) Ionuț Moldovan
1–7 May	Uzbekistan F2	Namangan $15,000	Hard	(Russia) Artem Derepasko	(Israel) Jonathan Erlich (Israel) Lior Mor
1–7 May	Austria F1	Salzburg $10,000	Clay	(Austria) Clemens Trimmel	(Australia) Tim Crichton (Australia) Ashley Fisher
1–7 May	Chile F6	Santiago $10,000	Clay	(Argentina) Sergio Roitman	(Chile) Sebastian Contador (Argentina) Juan Pablo Guzmán
8–14 May	Germany F3	Teurershof $15,000	Clay	(Russia) Nikolay Davydenko	(Netherlands) Bobbie Altelaar (Germany) Jan Weinzierl
8–14 May	Great Britain F5	Newcastle $15,000	Clay	(France) Olivier Mutis	(Czech Republic) František Čermák (Czech Republic) Radovan Světlík
8–14 May	Japan F4	Fukuoka $15,000	Hard	(Japan) Takahiro Terachi	(South Korea) Lee Hyung-taik (South Korea) Yoon Yong-il
8–14 May	USA F11	Tampa, Florida $15,000	Clay	(Sweden) Björn Rehnquist	(Bosnia and Herzegovina) Kristian Capalik (United States) Matt Guyaux
8–14 May	Argentina F4	Mendoza $10,000	Clay	(Argentina) Sergio Roitman	(Argentina) Juan Pablo Guzmán (Argentina) Sergio Roitman
8–14 May	Austria F2	Telfs $10,000	Clay	(Austria) Clemens Trimmel	(Republic of Ireland) Scott Barron (Finland) Jarkko Nieminen
8–14 May	Italy F1	Verona $10,000	Clay	(Italy) Stefano Cobolli	(Italy) Filippo Messori (Italy) Davide Scala
8–14 May	Morocco F1	Casablanca $10,000	Clay	(Spain) Javier Pérez Vázquez	(Spain) Carlos Castellanos (Spain) Javier Pérez Vázquez
15–21 May	Germany F4	Neckarau $15,000	Clay	(Austria) Clemens Trimmel	(Germany) Sebastian Jaeger (Germany) Florian Jeschonek
15–21 May	Japan F5	Fukuoka $15,000	Hard	(South Korea) Yoon Yong-il	(Japan) Mitsuru Takada (Japan) Takahiro Terachi
15–21 May	USA F12	Vero Beach, Florida $15,000	Clay	(Venezuela) José de Armas	(United States) Levar Harper-Griffith (Russia) Dmitry Tursunov
15–21 May	Argentina F5	Santa Fe $10,000	Clay	(Argentina) José Acasuso	Doubles cancelled due to rain
15–21 May	Austria F3	Schwaz $10,000	Clay	(Denmark) Kristian Pless	(Slovakia) Frantisek Babej (Czech Republic) Lukáš Dlouhý
15–21 May	Italy F2	Forlì $10,000	Clay	(Italy) Massimo Dell'Acqua	(Italy) Fabio Maggi (Spain) Gabriel Trujillo Soler
15–21 May	Morocco F2	Casablanca $10,000	Clay	(Spain) Rubén Ramírez Hidalgo	(Australia) Ashley Ford (Australia) Jordan Kerr
22–28 May	Korea F1	Seoul $15,000	Clay	(South Korea) Park Seung-kyu	(South Korea) Kim Dong-hyun (South Korea) Lee Chang-hoon
22–28 May	USA F13	Boca Raton, Florida $15,000	Clay	(Belgium) Kris Goossens	(Australia) Matthew Breen (Australia) Lee Pearson
22–28 May	Argentina F6	Misiones $10,000	Clay	(Spain) Diego Hipperdinger	(Argentina) Leonardo Olguín (Argentina) Patricio Rudi
22–28 May	Italy F3	Viterbo $10,000	Clay	(Germany) Jan Weinzierl	(Italy) Massimo Dell'Acqua (Germany) Jan Weinzierl
22–28 May	Morocco F3	Agadir $10,000	Clay	(Morocco) Mounir El Aarej	(Australia) Ashley Ford (Australia) Jordan Kerr

=== June ===
Date	Tournament	City	Surface	Singles champions	Doubles champions
29 May–4 June	Ireland F1	Dublin $15,000	Carpet	(Denmark) Kristian Pless	(Belgium) Gilles Elseneer (France) Jean-Michel Pequery
29 May–4 June	Korea F2	Seoul $15,000	Clay	(South Korea) Chung Hee-seok	(South Korea) Lee Sang-hoon (South Korea) Sohn Seung-ri
29 May–4 June	USA F14	Tampa, Florida $15,000	Clay	(France) Cedric Kauffmann	(Mexico) Enrique Abaroa (Colombia) Mauricio Hadad
29 May–4 June	Italy F4	Pavia $10,000	Clay	(Austria) Thomas Schiessling	(Italy) Igor Gaudi (Japan) Takao Suzuki
29 May–4 June	Mexico F1	Guadalajara $10,000	Clay	(Mexico) Alejandro Hernández	(Mexico) David Roditi (Mexico) Luis Uribe
5–11 June	Germany F5	Oberweier $15,000 H	Clay	(Belgium) Olivier Rochus	(Italy) Enzo Artoni (Argentina) Francisco Cabello
5–11 June	Ireland F2	Dublin $15,000	Carpet	(Republic of Ireland) Owen Casey	(Australia) Jordan Kerr (South Africa) Damien Roberts
5–11 June	Italy F5	Turin $10,000	Clay	(Italy) Massimo Dell'Acqua	(France) Julien Cuaz (France) Guillaume Marx
5–11 June	Mexico F2	Campeche $10,000	Hard	(Netherlands) Marc Merry	(Mexico) Bruno Echagaray (Mexico) Santiago Gonzales
5–11 June	Slovenia F1	Portorož $10,000	Clay	(Slovakia) Branislav Sekáč	(Spain) David Morente-Guerrero (Croatia) Krešimir Ritz
12–18 June	USA F15	Berkeley, California $15,000	Hard	(United States) Alex Kim	(United States) Geoff Abrams (United States) Alex Kim
12–18 June	Germany F6	Villingen $10,000 H	Clay	(Netherlands) Melle van Gemerden	(Belgium) Kris Goossens (Romania) Ionuț Moldovan
12–18 June	Canada F1	Mississauga $10,000	Hard	(United States) Diego Ayala	(France) Marc-Olivier Baron (Canada) Charles-Antoine Sévigny
12–18 June	Hungary F1	Budapest $10,000	Clay	(Finland) Tapio Nurminen	(Spain) Raul Diaz Garcia (Spain) Sergi Durán
12–18 June	Italy F6	Valdengo $10,000	Clay	(Italy) Marzio Martelli	(Italy) Stefano Cobolli (Italy) Elia Grossi
12–18 June	Macedonia F1	Skopje $10,000	Clay	(France) Xavier Pujo	(Hungary) Zoltán Böröczky (Federal Republic of Yugoslavia) Relja Fišer Dulić
12–18 June	Mexico F3	Mérida $10,000	Hard	(Brazil) Ricardo Mello	(Mexico) Javier Gutierrez (Mexico) Luis Uribe
12–18 June	Poland F1	Kraków $10,000	Clay	(Spain) David Ferrer	(Italy) Fabio Maggi (Spain) Emilio Viuda-Hernandez
12–18 June	Slovenia F2	Maribor $10,000	Clay	(Slovenia) Marko Tkalec	(Slovenia) Andrej Kračman (Slovenia) Marko Tkalec
19–25 June	France F11	Noisy-le-Grand $15,000 H	Clay	(Austria) Clemens Trimmel	(France) Julien Cuaz (Finland) Tommi Lenho
19–25 June	Germany F7	Trier $15,000	Clay	(Netherlands) Melle van Gemerden	(Germany) Boris Bachert (Germany) Lars Uebel
19–25 June	USA F16	Redding, California $15,000	Hard	(United States) Zack Fleishman	(United States) Zack Fleishman (United States) Robert Kendrick
19–25 June	Canada F2	Montreal $10,000	Hard	(Canada) Simon Larose	(Chile) Jaime Fillol Jr. (United States) Michael Jessup
19–25 June	Greece F1	Chalcis $10,000	Hard	(Israel) Kobi Ziv	(Australia) Stephen Huss (Greece) Anastasios Vasiliadis
19–25 June	Hungary F2	Budapest $10,000	Clay	(Finland) Tapio Nurminen	(Hungary) Zoltán Nagy (Hungary) Marton Ott
19–25 June	Macedonia F2	Skopje $10,000	Clay	(France) Xavier Pujo	(France) Xavier Pujo (France) Cyril Saubion
19–25 June	Mexico F4	Cozumel $10,000	Hard	(United States) Jack Brasington	(Mexico) Miguel Gallardo Valles (Mexico) Marcello Amador
19–25 June	Poland F2	Zabrze $10,000	Clay	(Belgium) Dick Norman	(Poland) Piotr Szczepanik (Ukraine) Orest Tereshchuk
19–25 June	Slovenia F3	Kranj $10,000	Clay	(Slovenia) Marko Tkalec	(Austria) Oliver Marach (Slovenia) Marko Tkalec

=== July ===
Date	Tournament	City	Surface	Singles champions	Doubles champions
26 June–2 July	France F12	Toulon $15,000	Clay	(Japan) Jun Kato	(France) Julien Cuaz (France) Jean-Baptiste Perlant
26 June–2 July	USA F17	Chico, California $15,000	Hard	(United States) Zack Fleishman	(United States) Michael Joyce (Australia) Luke Smith
26 June–2 July	Canada F3	Lachine $10,000	Hard	(United States) Mardy Fish	(Japan) Natsuki Harada (Japan) Akira Matsushita
26 June–2 July	Greece F2	Nafplio $10,000	Hard	(Greece) Konstantinos Economidis	(United States) Dustin Mauck (United States) Keith Pollak
26 June–2 July	Hungary F3	Budapest $10,000	Clay	(Hungary) Kornél Bardóczky	(Czech Republic) Igor Brukner (Austria) Oliver Marach
26 June–2 July	Macedonia F3	Skopje $10,000	Hard	(Croatia) Ivan Vajda	(Federal Republic of Yugoslavia) Relja Fišer Dulić (Bulgaria) Milen Velev
26 June–2 July	Poland F3	Katowice $10,000	Clay	(Belgium) Dick Norman	(Poland) Krzysztof Kwinta (Poland) Marcin Matkowski
26 June–2 July	Turkey F1	Istanbul $10,000	Hard	(Israel) Nir Welgreen	(Australia) Sebastien Swierk (Australia) Josh Tuckfield
3–9 July	Greece F3	Syros $10,000	Hard	(Greece) Konstantinos Economidis	(Australia) Stephen Huss (United Kingdom) James Smith
3–9 July	Turkey F2	Istanbul $10,000	Hard	(Australia) Sebastien Swierk	(France) Cedric Kauffmann (Australia) Jordan Kerr
10–16 July	France F13	Bourg-en-Bresse $15,000	Clay	(France) Sébastien de Chaunac	(Germany) Tobias Clemens (Germany) Frank Moser
10–16 July	Georgia F1	Tbilisi $15,000	Clay	(Ukraine) Orest Tereshchuk	(Kazakhstan) Alexey Kedryuk (Ukraine) Orest Tereshchuk
10–16 July	Spain F1	Alicante $15,000	Clay	(Spain) Óscar Hernández	(Spain) Javier Pérez Vázquez (Argentina) Santiago Ventura Bertomeu
10–16 July	Turkey F3	Istanbul $10,000	Hard	(Australia) Josh Tuckfield	(Australia) Sebastien Swierk (Australia) Josh Tuckfield
17–23 July	Georgia F2	Tbilisi $15,000	Clay	(Russia) Artem Derepasko	(Czech Republic) Igor Brukner (Slovakia) Martin Hromec
17–23 July	Indonesia F3	Jakarta $15,000	Hard	(Thailand) Danai Udomchoke	(Indonesia) Sulistyo Wibowo (Indonesia) Bonit Wiryawan
17–23 July	Spain F2	Elche $15,000	Clay	(Spain) Gorka Fraile	(Spain) Óscar Hernández (Spain) Marcos Roy-Girardi
17–23 July	USA F19	Kansas City, Missouri $15,000	Hard	(Australia) Jaymon Crabb	(United States) Jeff Laski (United States) Jeff Morrison
17–23 July	France F14	Aix-en-Provence $10,000	Clay	(France) Sébastien de Chaunac	(Argentina) Federico Cardinali (Argentina) Alejandro Correa
17–23 July	Germany F8	Leun $10,000	Clay	(Germany) Alexander Waske	(Australia) Stephen Huss (Australia) Lee Pearson
24–30 July	Hungary F5	Budapest $15,000	Clay	(Czech Republic) Pavel Šnobel	(Israel) Amir Hadad (Slovakia) Vladimír Pláteník
24–30 July	Indonesia F4	Jakarta $15,000	Hard	(South Korea) Seung-Kyu Park	(Indonesia) Hendri Susilo Pramono (Indonesia) Febi Widhiyanto
24–30 July	USA F20	St. Joseph, Missouri $15,000	Hard	(Russia) Dmitry Tursunov	(South Africa) Wesley Moodie (South Africa) Shaun Rudman
24–30 July	Germany F9	Zell $10,000 H	Clay	(Bosnia and Herzegovina) Bojan Vujić	(Australia) Stephen Huss (Australia) Lee Pearson
24–30 July	Egypt F1	Cairo $10,000	Clay	(Egypt) Amr Ghoneim	(Slovakia) Tomáš Janči (Slovakia) Michal Mertiňák
24–30 July	France F15	Aix-les-Bains $10,000	Clay	(France) Xavier Pujo	(Australia) Luke Bourgeois (Australia) Domenic Marafiote
24–30 July	Italy F8	Jesi $10,000	Clay	(Italy) Elia Grossi	(Czech Republic) Jaroslav Levinský (Czech Republic) Michal Navrátil
24–30 July	Spain F3	Gandia $10,000	Clay	(Spain) David Ferrer	(Spain) David Ferrer (Spain) Didac Pérez
24–31 July	Argentina F7	Concordia $10,000	Clay	(Argentina) Juan Pablo Guzmán	(Argentina) Juan Pablo Brzezicki (Argentina) Cristian Villagrán

=== August ===
Date	Tournament	City	Surface	Singles champions	Doubles champions
31 July–6 August	Germany F10	Bernau $15,000 H	Clay	(Germany) Simon Greul	(Australia) Stephen Huss (Australia) Lee Pearson
31 July–6 August	Hungary F6	Budaörs $15,000	Clay	(Denmark) Kristian Pless	(Czech Republic) Igor Brukner (Slovakia) Martin Hromec
31 July–6 August	USA F21	Decatur, Illinois $15,000	Hard	(United States) Jeff Williams	(United States) Jason Cook (United States) Jeff Williams
31 July–6 August	Argentina F8	Córdoba $10,000	Clay	(Argentina) Rafael Serpa-Guinazu	(Argentina) Martin Stringari (Italy) Tomas Tenconi
31 July–6 August	Egypt F2	Cairo $10,000	Clay	(Egypt) Hisham Hemeda	(Egypt) Amr Ghoneim (Egypt) Karim Maamoun
31 July–6 August	Estland F1	Pärnu $10,000	Clay	(Sweden) Johan Örtegren	(Russia) Artem Derepasko (Ukraine) Orest Tereshchuk
31 July–6 August	France F16	Valescure $10,000	Hard	(France) Jeremy Delinbeuf	(France) Benjamin Cassaigne (France) Julien Cuaz
31 July–6 August	Italy F9	San Benedetto del Tronto $10,000	Clay	(Austria) Oliver Marach	(Austria) Oliver Marach (Austria) Gilbert Schaller
31 July–6 August	Spain F4	Denia $10,000	Clay	(Spain) Gorka Fraile	(Spain) Daniel Casquero Herrero (Spain) Gorka Fraile
7–13 August	Egypt F3	Cairo $10,000	Clay	(Czech Republic) Jaroslav Pospíšil	(United States) Rafael de Mesa (Mexico) Luis Uribe
7–13 August	Latvia F1	Jūrmala $10,000	Clay	(Ukraine) Orest Tereshchuk	(Denmark) Thomas Larsen (Germany) Andreas Tattermusch
7–13 August	Spain F5	Xàtiva $10,000	Clay	(Spain) Iván Navarro	(Spain) Roberto Menéndez-Ferré (Spain) Gabriel Trujillo Soler
7–13 August	Great Britain F6	Bath $15,000	Hard	(France) Julien Couly	(Israel) Amir Hadad (United Kingdom) Miles Maclagan
7–13 August	USA F22	Godfrey, Illinois $15,000	Hard	(The Bahamas) Mark Merklein	(United States) Jeff Laski (United States) Gavin Sontag
7–13 August	Argentina F9	Buenos Aires $10,000	Clay	(Uruguay) Pablo Bianchi	(Argentina) Martin Stringari (Italy) Tomas Tenconi
7–14 August	Italy F10	Trani $10,000 H	Clay	(Austria) Oliver Marach	(Australia) Tim Crichton (Australia) Todd Perry
7–14 August	Germany F11	Berlin $15,000	Clay	(Sweden) Johan Settergren	(Sweden) Henrik Andersson (Sweden) Johan Settergren
14–20 August	Germany F12	Kassel $15,000	Clay	(Spain) Gorka Fraile	(Germany) Stefan Wolpers (Germany) Torsten Wolpers
14–20 August	Jordan F1	Amman $15,000	Hard	(France) Benjamin Cassaigne	(Egypt) Amr Ghoneim (Egypt) Karim Maamoun
14–20 August	Russia F1	Balashikha $15,000	Clay	(Russia) Dmitry Vlasov	(Kazakhstan) Alexey Kedryuk (United States) Oren Motevassel
14–20 August	Lithuania F1	Vilnius $10,000	Clay	(Lithuania) Rolandas Muraška	(Russia) Andrej Kračman (Slovenia) Marko Tkalec
14–20 August	Argentina F10	Buenos Aires $10,000	Clay	(Argentina) Gustavo Marcaccio	(Argentina) Gustavo Marcaccio (Argentina) Patricio Rudi
14–20 August	Spain F6	Vigo $15,000	Clay	(Austria) Oliver Marach	(Spain) Marc Fornell Mestres (Spain) Didac Pérez
14–21 August	Great Britain F7	Hampstead $15,000	Hard	(Denmark) Frederik Fetterlein	(United Kingdom) James Davidson (United Kingdom) Oliver Freelove
21–27 August	Jordan F2	Amman $15,000	Hard	(China) Zhu Benqiang	(Egypt) Hisham Hemeda (Egypt) Marwan Zewar
21–27 August	Russia F2	Zhukovski $15,000	Clay	(Russia) Dmitry Vlasov	(Russia) Mikhail Elgin (Russia) Rouslan Nourmatov
21–27 August	Spain F7	Irun $15,000	Clay	(Spain) Pedro Cánovas	(Italy) Alessandro Da Col (Spain) Ángel-José Martín-Arroyo
21–27 August	Luxembourg F1	Luxembourg $10,000	Clay	(Belgium) Dick Norman	(Germany) Christopher Kas (Belgium) Dick Norman

=== September ===
Date	Tournament	City	Surface	Singles champions	Doubles champions
28 Aug–3 September	Netherlands F1	Alphen aan den Rijn $15,000 H	Clay	(Netherlands) Dennis van Scheppingen	(Netherlands) Marc Merry (Netherlands) Dennis van Scheppingen
28 Aug–3 September	Spain F8	Santander $15,000	Clay	(Spain) Diego Hipperdinger	(Spain) Carlos Rexach-Itoiz (Spain) Gabriel Trujillo Soler
28 Aug–3 September	Dominican Republic F1	Santo Domingo $10,000	Clay	(Venezuela) Yohny Romero	(Ecuador) Luis Fernando Manrique (Netherlands Antilles) Jean-Julien Rojer
28 Aug–3 September	Peru F1	Lima $10,000	Clay	(Brazil) Júlio Silva	(Argentina) Patricio Arquez (Argentina) Ignacio González King
28 Aug–3 September	Poland F4	Łódź $10,000	Clay	(Poland) Krystian Pfeiffer	(Czech Republic) Igor Brukner (Czech Republic) Petr Dezort
4–10 September	Netherlands F2	Hilversum $15,000 H	Clay	(Netherlands) Dennis van Scheppingen	(Argentina) Leonardo Olguín (Argentina) Marcello Wowk
4–10 September	Czech Republic F1	Znojmo $15,000	Clay	(Germany) Christopher Kas	(Czech Republic) Igor Brukner (Slovakia) Martin Hromec
4–10 September	Romania F1	Galați $15,000	Clay	(Italy) Leonardo Azzaro	(Italy) Leonardo Azzaro (Italy) Fabio Maggi
4–10 September	Spain F9	Oviedo $15,000	Clay	(Spain) Roberto Menéndez-Ferré	(Spain) Carlos Rexach-Itoiz (Spain) Gabriel Trujillo Soler
4–10 September	Bahamas F1	Nassau $10,000	Hard	(Sweden) Fredrik Giers	(Japan) Yaoki Ishii (United States) Kunj Majmudar
4–10 September	Peru F2	Lima $10,000	Clay	(Argentina) Diego Veronelli	(Argentina) Gustavo Marcaccio (Argentina) Patricio Rudi
4–10 September	Poland F5	Szczecin $10,000	Clay	(Belarus) Vitali Chvets	(Belarus) Vitali Chvets (Belarus) Vasilly Kazhera
9–16 September	Norway F1	Oslo $10,000	Carpet (i)	(Sweden) Johan Settergren	(Sweden) Henrik Andersson (Sweden) Johan Settergren
11–17 September	France F17	Bagnères-de-Bigorre $15,000 H	Hard	(France) Jean-Baptiste Perlant	(South Africa) Rik de Voest (Canada) Frédéric Niemeyer
11–17 September	Romania F2	Bucharest $15,000	Clay	(Spain) Diego Hipperdinger	(Italy) Leonardo Azzaro (Italy) Fabio Maggi
11–17 September	USA F22A	West Hampton, New York $15,000	Clay	(Russia) Dmitry Vlasov	(India) Vikrant Chadha (New Zealand) James Shortall
11–17 September	Czech Republic F2	Karlovy Vary $15,000	Clay	(Austria) Zbynek Mlynarik	(Czech Republic) Jiri Hobler (Czech Republic) Pavel Šnobel
11–17 September	Jamaica F1	Kingston $10,000	Hard	(Argentina) Nicolás Todero	(Jamaica) Jermaine Smith (Jamaica) Scott Willinsky
11–17 September	Japan F6	Kashiwa $10,000	Hard	(Indonesia) Suwandi Suwandi	(Australia) Jay Gooding (Australia) David McNamara
11–17 September	Peru F3	Lima $10,000	Clay	(Peru) Iván Miranda	(Brazil) Thiago Alves (Brazil) Bruno Soares
11–17 September	Poland F6	Poznań $10,000	Clay	(Belarus) Vitali Chvets	(Poland) Filip Aniola (Poland) Mariusz Fyrstenberg
11–17 September	Spain F10	Madrid $10,000	Hard	(France) Julien Couly	(Spain) Javier Pérez Vázquez (Spain) Angel Jose Martin-Arroyo
18–24 September	Brazil F1	Vitória $15,000	Clay	(Brazil) Ricardo Mello	(Brazil) Rodrigo Ribeiro (Brazil) Júlio Silva
18–24 September	Italy F11	Oristano $15,000	Hard	(Italy) Filippo Messori	(Italy) Omar Camporese (Russia) Igor Kornienko
18–24 September	Ukraine F1	Gorlovka $15,000	Clay	(Finland) Kim Tiilikainen	(Hungary) Gergely Kisgyörgy (Finland) Kim Tiilikainen
18–24 September	USA F22B	Setauket $15,000	Clay	(Russia) Dmitry Vlasov	(Italy) Giorgio Galimberti (India) Syed Fazaluddin
18–24 September	Bolivia F1	La Paz $10,000	Clay	(Argentina) Patricio Arquez	(Chile) Jaime Fillol Jr. (Chile) Miguel Miranda
18–24 September	Great Britain F8	Sunderland $10,000	Hard (i)	(Germany) Bernard Parun	(United Kingdom) James Auckland (United Kingdom) Barry Fulcher
18–24 September	Japan F7	Chiba $10,000	Hard	(Australia) Leigh Holland	(Australia) Jay Gooding (Australia) David McNamara
18–24 September	Sweden F1	Gothenburg $10,000	Carpet (i)	(Norway) Helge Koll-Frafjord	(Sweden) Robert Lindstedt (Sweden) Fredrik Lovén
18–25 September	France F18	Mulhouse $15,000 H	Hard (i)	(Croatia) Ivo Karlović	(Finland) Ville Liukko (Netherlands) Rogier Wassen
25–30 September	Sweden F2	Gothenburg $10,000	Carpet (i)	(Sweden) Johan Settergren	(Germany) Arne Kreitz (Austria) Alexander Peya

=== October ===
Date	Tournament	City	Surface	Singles champions	Doubles champions
25 Sep–1 October	France F19	Plaisir $15,000 H	Hard (i)	(Belgium) Dick Norman	(France) Julien Benneteau (France) Nicolas Mahut
25 Sep–1 October	Brazil F22	Florianópolis $15,000	Clay	(Argentina) Diego Veronelli	(Brazil) Márcio Carlsson (Brazil) Ricardo Schlachter
25 Sep–1 October	Italy F12	Selargius $15,000	Hard	(Italy) Filippo Messori	(South Africa) Rik de Voest (Austria) Luben Pampoulov
25 Sep–1 October	Bolivia F2	Cochabamba $10,000	Clay	(Argentina) Patricio Arquez	(Argentina) Gustavo Marcaccio (Argentina) Patricio Rudi
25 Sep–1 October	Great Britain F9	Glasgow $10,000	Hard (i)	(Switzerland) Jean-Claude Scherrer	(United Kingdom) Simon Dickson (United Kingdom) Mark Hilton
25 Sep–1 October	Spain F11	Barcelona $10,000	Clay	(Spain) Diego Hipperdinger	(Spain) Jordi Marsé-Vidri (Spain) Guillermo Platel
25 Sep–1 October	Japan F8	Kawaguchi $10,000	Hard	(Germany) Denis Gremelmayr	(Japan) Tasuku Iwami (Japan) Mitsuru Takada
25 Sep–1 October	Uzbekistan F3	Guliston $10,000	Hard	(Belarus) Alexander Shvets	(Czech Republic) Jaroslav Levinský (Slovakia) Branislav Sekáč
25 Sep–2 October	Ukraine F2	Gorlovka $15,000	Clay	(Italy) Stefano Cobolli	(Belarus) Vitali Chvets (Russia) Sergei Pozdnev
2–8 October	France F20	Nevers $15,000 H	Hard (i)	(France) Jérôme Haehnel	(Israel) Noam Behr (Pakistan) Aisam Qureshi
2–8 October	Great Britain F10	Edinburgh $15,000	Hard (i)	(South Africa) Wesley Moodie	(South Africa) Wesley Moodie (South Africa) Shaun Rudman
2–8 October	Bolivia F3	Santa Cruz $10,000	Clay	(Argentina) Patricio Rudi	(Argentina) Juan Pablo Brzezicki (Argentina) Cristian Villagrán
2–8 October	Spain F12	Martos $10,000	Hard	(Spain) Francisco Fogués	(Andorra) Joan Jiménez-Guerra (Spain) Javier Perez-Vasquez
2–8 October	Uzbekistan F4	Qarshi $10,000	Hard	(Israel) Lior Dahan	(Slovakia) Viktor Bruthans (Slovakia) Branislav Sekáč
9–15 October	Great Britain F11	Leeds $15,000	Hard (i)	(United Kingdom) Lee Childs	(United Kingdom) Lee Childs (United Kingdom) James Nelson
9–15 October	Paraguay F1	Asunción $15,000	Clay	(Brazil) Júlio Silva	(Argentina) Juan Pablo Brzezicki (Argentina) Cristian Villagrán
9–15 October	France F21	Forbach $10,000	Carpet (i)	(France) Jérôme Haehnel	(Germany) Matthias Muller (Germany) Andreas Tattermusch
9–15 October	Spain F13	El Ejido $10,000	Hard	(Spain) Jose Ezequiel Lido-Mico	(Netherlands) Fred Hemmes (Spain) Carlos-Alberto Marcote-Jimeno
16–22 October	Colombia F1	Bogotá $15,000	Clay	(Colombia) Mauricio Hadad	(Ecuador) Giovanni Lapentti (Colombia) Rubén Torres
16–22 October	Jamaica F2	Negril $15,000	Clay	(Sweden) Daniel Andersson	(United States) Thomas Blake (The Bahamas) Mark Merklein
16–22 October	Paraguay F2	Asunción $15,000	Clay	(Argentina) Edgardo Massa	(Argentina) Patricio Arquez (Argentina) Ignacio González King
16–22 October	USA F23	Waco, Texas $15,000	Hard	(Netherlands) Martin Verkerk	(South Africa) Wesley Moodie (South Africa) Shaun Rudman
16–22 October	Finland F1	Vierumäki $10,000	Hard	(Austria) Alexander Peya	(Sweden) Mattias Kempe-Bergman (Sweden) Björn Rehnquist
16–22 October	France F22	Saint-Dizier $10,000	Hard (i)	(Belgium) Gilles Elseneer	(Czech Republic) Igor Brukner (Slovakia) Martin Hromec
23–29 October	France F23	La Roche-sur-Yon $15,000	Hard (i)	(Czech Republic) Jan Vacek	(Slovakia) Martin Hromec (Belgium) Wim Neefs
23–29 October	Colombia F2	Bogotá $15,000	Clay	(Colombia) Mauricio Hadad	(Italy) Leonardo Azzaro (Israel) Eyal Ran
23–29 October	Indonesia F5	Bandung $15,000	Hard	(Slovakia) Ladislav Švarc	(France) Gwaneal Gueit (Slovakia) Ladislav Švarc
23–29 October	Jamaica F3	Negril $15,000	Hard	(Czech Republic) Jan Hájek	(Sweden) Johan Kareld (Sweden) Johan Örtegren
23–29 October	USA F24	Houston, Texas $15,000	Hard	(South Africa) Wesley Moodie	(South Africa) Wesley Moodie (South Africa) Shaun Rudman
23–29 October	Finland F2	Helsinki $10,000	Carpet	(Finland) Tapio Nurminen	(Czech Republic) Karol Beck (Czech Republic) lgor Zelenay
23–29 October	Greece F6	Chania $10,000	Hard	(Greece) Konstantinos Economidis	(Slovakia) Viktor Bruthans (Slovakia) Branislav Sekáč

=== November ===
Date	Tournament	City	Surface	Singles champions	Doubles champions
30 Oct–4 November	France F24	Rodez $10,000	Hard (i)	(France) Jean-Michel Pequery	(France) Marc Bauer (France) Sebastien Lami
30 Oct–5 November	Indonesia F6	Jakarta $15,000	Hard	(Slovakia) Ladislav Švarc	(Indonesia) Hendri Susilo Pramono (Indonesia) Febi Widhiyanto
30 Oct–5 November	USA F25	Hattiesburg, Mississippi $15,000	Hard	(Republic of Ireland) Scott Barron	(South Africa) Wesley Moodie (South Africa) Shaun Rudman
30 Oct–5 November	Finland F3	Helsinki $10,000	Hard	(Austria) Alexander Peya	(Germany) Arne Kreitz (Austria) Alexander Peya
30 Oct–5 November	Greece F7	Heraklio $10,000	Hard	(Germany) Florian Jeschonek	(Croatia) Ivan Cinkuš (Croatia) Krešimir Ritz
30 Oct–5 November	Mexico F5	Zacatecas $10,000	Clay	(Hungary) Gergely Kisgyörgy	(Brazil) Eduardo Bergmann (Hungary) Gergely Kisgyörgy
6–11 November	India F4	Lucknow $10,000	Grass	(United Kingdom) Jonathan Marray	(France) Leslie Demiliani (Italy) Dario Pizzato
6–12 November	Australia F1	Beaumaris $15,000	Hard	(Czech Republic) Radim Žitko	(Australia) Jay Gooding (Australia) David McNamara
6–12 November	USA F26	Lafayette, California $15,000	Hard	(South Africa) Justin Bower	(United States) Jack Brasington (United States) Doug Root
6–11 November	Cyprus F1	Nicosia $10,000	Clay	(Austria) Oliver Marach	(Slovenia) Andrej Kračman (Slovenia) Marko Tkalec
6–12 November	Mexico F6	Leon $10,000	Hard	(Mexico) Mariano Sánchez	(Mexico) German Maldonado (Mexico) Mariano Sánchez
6–12 November	Thailand F1	Nonthaburi $10,000	Hard	(Uzbekistan) Dmitri Tomashevich	(Thailand) Vittaya Samrej (Thailand) Narathorn Srichaphan
13–18 November	India F5	Chandigarh $10,000	Hard	(Russia) Sergei Krotiouk	(Slovakia) Tomas Janci (Slovakia) Michal Mertiňák
13–19 November	Australia F2	Frankston $15,000	Hard	(Australia) Todd Larkham	(Australia) Paul Baccanello (Australia) Josh Tuckfield
13–19 November	USA F27	Clearwater, Florida $15,000	Hard	(South Africa) Justin Bower	(South Africa) Justin Bower (South Africa) Vaughan Snyman
13–19 November	Mexico F7	Torreón $10,000	Hard	(Mexico) Mariano Sánchez	(Mexico) German Maldonado (Mexico) Mariano Sánchez
13–19 November	Thailand F2	Pattaya $10,000	Hard	(Uzbekistan) Dmitri Tomashevich	(Thailand) Vittaya Samrej (Thailand) Narathorn Srichaphan
19–26 November	Australia F3	Berri $15,000	Grass	(Australia) Dejan Petrović	(Australia) Paul Baccanello (Australia) Dejan Petrović
20–25 November	India F6	Mumbai $10,000	Hard	(Republic of Ireland) John Doran	(Slovakia) Viktor Bruthans (Slovakia) Branislav Sekáč
20–26 November	Spain F14	Las Palmas $15,000	Clay	(Finland) Tapio Nurminen	(Czech Republic) Tomáš Cakl (Spain) Diego Hipperdinger
20–26 November	Vietnam F1	Ho Chi Minh City $10,000	Hard	(Pakistan) Aisam Qureshi	(Australia) Ashley Fisher (Pakistan) Aisam Qureshi
20–26 November	Chile F7	Valparaíso $10,000	Clay	(Chile) Hermes Gamonal	(Chile) Jaime Fillol Jr. (Argentina) Ignacio González King
20–26 November	USA F28	Malibu, California $15,000	Hard	(Russia) Dmitry Tursunov	(Venezuela) José de Armas (Netherlands) Djalmar Sistermans

=== December ===
Date	Tournament	City	Surface	Singles champions	Doubles champions
26 Nov–3 December	Australia F4	Barmera $15,000	Grass	(Australia) Luke Smith	(Australia) Tim Crichton (Australia) Todd Perry
27 Nov–3 December	Chile F8	Viña del Mar $10,000	Clay	(Argentina) Daniel Caracciolo	(Brazil) Ricardo Schlachter (Chile) Juan Felipe Yáñez
27 Nov–3 December	Spain F15	Maspalomas $15,000	Clay	(Spain) Diego Hipperdinger	(Spain) Didac Pérez (Spain) Ferran Ventura-Martell
27 Nov–3 December	Philippines F1	Manila $15,000 H	Hard	(Austria) Zbynek Mlynarik	(South Africa) Andrew Anderson (South Africa) Rik de Voest
28 Nov–3 December	USA F29	Laguna Niguel, California $15,000	Hard	(South Africa) Justin Bower	(Czech Republic) Karol Beck (France) Cedric Kauffmann
4–10 December	Chile F9	Santiago $10,000	Clay	(Argentina) Patricio Rudi	(Argentina) Matias O'Neille (Argentina) Patricio Rudi
4–10 December	Philippines F2	Manila $15,000	Hard	(Thailand) Danai Udomchoke	(South Africa) Donavan September (Thailand) Danai Udomchoke
4–10 December	USA F30	Scottsdale, Arizona $15,000	Hard	(Russia) Dmitry Tursunov	(United States) Gavin Sontag (Canada) Jerry Turek
