= 2001 French Open – Men's singles qualifying =

Men's singles qualifying
- 2001 French Open

Events
| Singles | men | women | | boys | girls |
| Doubles | men | women | mixed | boys | girls |
| WC Singles | men | women | quad |
| WC Doubles | men | women | quad |
| Legends | −45 | 45+ | women |

Qualification
| Singles | men | women |
- French Open

This article displays the qualifying draw for the Men's Singles at the 2001 French Open.

== Seeds ==
1. (Spain) Jacobo Díaz (qualified)
2. (Netherlands) Peter Wessels (first round)
3. (Spain) Germán Puentes-Alcaniz (first round)
4. (Germany) Christian Vinck (first round)
5. (United States) Cecil Mamiit (qualifying competition, lucky loser)
6. (Russia) Nikolay Davydenko (qualified)
7. (Switzerland) George Bastl (second round)
8. (Denmark) Kristian Pless (qualified)
9. (Brazil) Alexandre Simoni (first round)
10. (Italy) Federico Luzzi (qualifying competition, lucky loser)
11. (United States) Michael Russell (qualified)
12. (Brazil) André Sá (first round)
13. (Spain) Albert Montañés (qualified)
14. (Germany) Markus Hantschk (first round)
15. (Hungary) Attila Sávolt (second round)
16. (Argentina) David Nalbandian (first round)
17. (Belgium) Dick Norman (second round)
18. (Costa Rica) Juan Antonio Marín (qualified)
19. (Thailand) Paradorn Srichaphan (second round)
20. (Germany) Tomas Behrend (qualified)
21. (Romania) Adrian Voinea (qualifying competition)
22. (Peru) Luis Horna (first round)
23. (United States) Kevin Kim (first round)
24. (Czech Republic) Jan Vacek (first round)
25. (Georgia (country)) Irakli Labadze (second round)
26. (Spain) Emilio Benfele Álvarez (second round)
27. (Spain) Óscar Serrano (second round)
28. (United Kingdom) Martin Lee (second round)
29. (Spain) Juan Albert Viloca (qualifying competition)
30. (United States) James Blake (second round)
31. (Czech Republic) Tomáš Zíb (first round)
32. (South Korea) Yoon Yong-il (second round)

== Qualifiers ==
1. (Spain) Jacobo Díaz
2. (Germany) Marc-Kevin Goellner
3. (Italy) Stefano Galvani
4. (Norway) Jan Frode Andersen
5. (Germany) Tomas Behrend
6. (Russia) Nikolay Davydenko
7. (Chile) Fernando González
8. (Denmark) Kristian Pless
9. (France) Cedric Kauffmann
10. (Costa Rica) Juan Antonio Marín
11. (United States) Michael Russell
12. (Netherlands) John Van Lottum
13. (Spain) Albert Montañés
14. (South Africa) Marcos Ondruska
15. (Spain) Feliciano López
16. (Norway) Christian Ruud

== Lucky losers ==
1. (United States) Cecil Mamiit
2. (Italy) Federico Luzzi

== Qualifying draw ==
Key

- Q = Qualifier
- WC = Wild card
- LL = Lucky loser
- Alt = Alternate
- ITF = ITF entry
- PR = Protected ranking
- SR = Special ranking
- SE = Special exempt
- JE = Junior exempt
- JR = Junior Accelerator Programme entrant
- CO = College Accelerator Programme entrant
- NG = Next Gen Accelerator Program entrant
- w/o = Walkover
- r = Retired
- d = Defaulted

=== First qualifier ===
First round
1 | (Spain) Jacobo Díaz | 6 | 7^{7}
(Italy) Renzo Furlan | 3 | 6^{5}
(Venezuela) Jimy Szymanski | 2 | 4
(Russia) Yuri Schukin | 6 | 6
(France) Thierry Guardiola | 6 | 5 | 6
(South Africa) Justin Bower | 1 | 7 | 4
(Spain) Julián Alonso | 4 | 6 | 6
24 | (Czech Republic) Jan Vacek | 6 | 4 | 3

Second round
1 | (Spain) Jacobo Díaz | 6 | 7
(Russia) Yuri Schukin | 2 | 5
(France) Thierry Guardiola | 3 | 6^{2}
(Spain) Julián Alonso | 6 | 7^{7}

Qualifying competition
1 | (Spain) Jacobo Díaz | 6 | 3 | 6
(Spain) Julián Alonso | 4 | 6 | 3

=== Second qualifier ===
First round
2 | (Netherlands) Peter Wessels | 3 | 4
(Israel) Noam Okun | 6 | 6
(South Africa) Neville Godwin | 6 | 4 | 3
(Germany) Michael Kohlmann | 3 | 6 | 6
(Italy) Leonardo Azzaro | 2 | 7^{7} | 5
(Germany) Marc-Kevin Goellner | 6 | 6^{4} | 7
(United States) Jeff Tarango | 3 | 3
27 | (Spain) Óscar Serrano | 6 | 6

Second round
(Israel) Noam Okun | 5 | 4
(Germany) Michael Kohlmann | 7 | 6
(Germany) Marc-Kevin Goellner | 6 | 6
27 | (Spain) Óscar Serrano | 4 | 3

Qualifying competition
(Germany) Michael Kohlmann | 4 | 6 | 3
(Germany) Marc-Kevin Goellner | 6 | 3 | 6

=== Third qualifier ===
First round
3 | (Spain) Germán Puentes-Alcaniz | 1 | 4
(Italy) Stefano Galvani | 6 | 6
(Argentina) Marcelo Charpentier | 6 | 6^{6} | 6
(Argentina) Hernán Gumy | 3 | 7^{8} | 2
(Australia) Todd Woodbridge | 5 | 3
(France) Stéphane Huet | 7 | 6
WC | (France) Éric Prodon | 6 | 6
23 | (United States) Kevin Kim | 3 | 4

Second round
(Italy) Stefano Galvani | 6 | 6^{2} | 6
(Argentina) Marcelo Charpentier | 2 | 7^{7} | 4
(France) Stéphane Huet | 2 | 6 | 6
WC | (France) Éric Prodon | 6 | 3 | 4

Qualifying competition
(Italy) Stefano Galvani | 6 | 7
(France) Stéphane Huet | 2 | 5

=== Fourth qualifier ===
First round
4 | (Germany) Christian Vinck | 4 | 0
(Germany) Axel Pretzsch | 6 | 6
(Italy) Filippo Messori | 1 | 6^{6}
(Uzbekistan) Oleg Ogorodov | 6 | 7^{8}
(Switzerland) Lorenzo Manta | 0 | 4
(Italy) Mosé Navarra | 6 | 6
(Norway) Jan Frode Andersen | 7 | 2 | 6
31 | (Czech Republic) Tomáš Zíb | 5 | 6 | 1

Second round
(Germany) Axel Pretzsch | 6 | 2 | 6
(Uzbekistan) Oleg Ogorodov | 4 | 6 | 3
(Italy) Mosé Navarra | 6 | 6^{6} | 0
(Norway) Jan Frode Andersen | 2 | 7^{8} | 6

Qualifying competition
(Germany) Axel Pretzsch | 6 | 0 | 5
(Norway) Jan Frode Andersen | 4 | 6 | 7

=== Fifth qualifier ===
First round
5 | (United States) Cecil Mamiit | 6 | 4 | 6
(Netherlands) Dennis van Scheppingen | 2 | 6 | 3
(Argentina) Cristian Kordasz | 7^{7} | 3 | 3
(Greece) Solon Peppas | 6^{5} | 6 | 6
(Israel) Andy Ram | 3 | 2
(Spain) Gorka Fraile | 6 | 6
(Germany) Marcello Craca | 2 | 2
20 | (Germany) Tomas Behrend | 6 | 6

Second round
5 | (United States) Cecil Mamiit | 6 | 1 | 6
(Greece) Solon Peppas | 4 | 6 | 2
(Spain) Gorka Fraile | 3 | 6 | 2
20 | (Germany) Tomas Behrend | 6 | 4 | 6

Qualifying competition
5 | (United States) Cecil Mamiit | 0 | 2
20 | (Germany) Tomas Behrend | 6 | 6

=== Sixth qualifier ===
First round
6 | (Russia) Nikolay Davydenko | 6 | 6
(United States) Eric Taino | 4 | 1
(Australia) Richard Fromberg | 3 | 3
(Austria) Werner Eschauer | 6 | 6
(France) Jean-François Bachelot | 2
(Czech Republic) Petr Luxa | 1^{r}
PR | (Italy) Marco Meneschincheri | 6 | 4 | 3
25 | (Georgia (country)) Irakli Labadze | 3 | 6 | 6

Second round
6 | (Russia) Nikolay Davydenko | 6 | 6
(Austria) Werner Eschauer | 4 | 4
(France) Jean-François Bachelot | 3 | 6 | 6
25 | (Georgia (country)) Irakli Labadze | 6 | 2 | 3

Qualifying competition
6 | (Russia) Nikolay Davydenko | 5 | 6 | 6
(France) Jean-François Bachelot | 7 | 2 | 4

=== Seventh qualifier ===
First round
7 | (Switzerland) George Bastl | 6 | 7
(Brazil) Francisco Costa | 4 | 5
(Argentina) Diego Moyano | 6 | 3 | 9
WC | (France) Florent Serra | 4 | 6 | 7
(Greece) Vasilis Mazarakis | 4 | 7^{7} | 4
(Chile) Fernando González | 6 | 6^{5} | 6
(Uruguay) Pablo Bianchi | 3 | 1
17 | (Belgium) Dick Norman | 6 | 6

Second round
7 | (Switzerland) George Bastl | 1 | 6 | 2
(Argentina) Diego Moyano | 6 | 2 | 6
(Chile) Fernando González | 3 | 7^{8} | 6
17 | (Belgium) Dick Norman | 6 | 6^{6} | 4

Qualifying competition
(Argentina) Diego Moyano | 4 | 6 | 3
(Chile) Fernando González | 6 | 4 | 6

=== Eighth qualifier ===
First round
8 | (Denmark) Kristian Pless | 7^{7} | 6
(United States) Mardy Fish | 6^{3} | 2
(France) Olivier Mutis | 4 | 3
(Haiti) Ronald Agénor | 6 | 6
(Italy) Filippo Volandri | 7 | 6
(Russia) Andrei Cherkasov | 5 | 2
(United States) Vince Spadea | 3 | 2
29 | (Spain) Juan Albert Viloca | 6 | 6

Second round
8 | (Denmark) Kristian Pless | 6 | 7
(Haiti) Ronald Agénor | 2 | 5
(Italy) Filippo Volandri | 4 | 4
29 | (Spain) Juan Albert Viloca | 6 | 6

Qualifying competition
8 | (Denmark) Kristian Pless | 6 | 6^{5} | 8
29 | (Spain) Juan Albert Viloca | 4 | 7^{7} | 6

=== Ninth qualifier ===
First round
9 | (Brazil) Alexandre Simoni | 4 | 4
(Germany) Oliver Gross | 6 | 6
(France) Cedric Kauffmann | 6 | 6
(Italy) Cristiano Caratti | 4 | 0
(Czech Republic) Ota Fukárek | 6 | 6
(Russia) Denis Golovanov | 4 | 0
(Switzerland) Ivo Heuberger | 6^{3} | 0
19 | (Thailand) Paradorn Srichaphan | 7^{7} | 6

Second round
(Germany) Oliver Gross | 3 | 3
(France) Cedric Kauffmann | 6 | 6
(Czech Republic) Ota Fukárek | 7 | 6
19 | (Thailand) Paradorn Srichaphan | 5 | 1

Qualifying competition
(France) Cedric Kauffmann | 6 | 3 | 11
(Czech Republic) Ota Fukárek | 2 | 6 | 9

=== Tenth qualifier ===
First round
10 | (Italy) Federico Luzzi | 6 | 6
(United Kingdom) Arvind Parmar | 4 | 2
WC | (France) Jean-Baptiste Perlant | 1 | 6^{2}
(United States) Alex O'Brien | 6 | 7^{7}
(United States) Hugo Armando | 6 | 6
(Indonesia) Suwandi Suwandi | 2 | 3
(Austria) Julian Knowle | 6 | 1 | 2
18 | (Costa Rica) Juan Antonio Marín | 3 | 6 | 6

Second round
10 | (Italy) Federico Luzzi | 6 | 1 | 6
(United States) Alex O'Brien | 3 | 6 | 4
(United States) Hugo Armando | 6 | 6^{5} | 3^{r}
18 | (Costa Rica) Juan Antonio Marín | 4 | 7^{7} | 5

Qualifying competition
10 | (Italy) Federico Luzzi | 2 | 2
18 | (Costa Rica) Juan Antonio Marín | 6 | 6

=== Eleventh qualifier ===
First round
11 | (United States) Michael Russell | 4 | 7 | 6
WC | (France) Olivier Patience | 6 | 5 | 0
(Slovakia) Ladislav Švarc | 3 | 0^{r}
(Bulgaria) Orlin Stanoytchev | 6 | 3
(Finland) Tuomas Ketola | 6 | 2 | 1
(Sweden) Johan Settergren | 1 | 6 | 6
(France) Lionel Roux | 4 | 4
28 | (United Kingdom) Martin Lee | 6 | 6

Second round
11 | (United States) Michael Russell | 6 | 6
(Bulgaria) Orlin Stanoytchev | 3 | 1
(Sweden) Johan Settergren | 7 | 4 | 7
28 | (United Kingdom) Martin Lee | 5 | 6 | 5

Qualifying competition
11 | (United States) Michael Russell | 6 | 7^{7}
(Sweden) Johan Settergren | 1 | 6^{0}

=== Twelfth qualifier ===
First round
12 | (Brazil) André Sá | 4 | 2
(Brazil) Flávio Saretta | 6 | 6
WC | (France) Grégory Carraz | 6 | 6
PR | (Italy) Stefano Pescosolido | 1 | 3
WC | (France) Julien Benneteau | 6^{6} | 6 | 4
(Netherlands) John Van Lottum | 7^{8} | 1 | 6
(Socialist Federal Republic of Yugoslavia) Nenad Zimonjić | 0 | 6 | 2
32 | (South Korea) Yoon Yong-il | 6 | 4 | 6

Second round
(Brazil) Flávio Saretta | 7^{7} | 6
WC | (France) Grégory Carraz | 6^{4} | 2
(Netherlands) John Van Lottum | 6 | 6
32 | (South Korea) Yoon Yong-il | 4 | 1

Qualifying competition
(Brazil) Flávio Saretta | 4 | 1
(Netherlands) John Van Lottum | 6 | 6

=== Thirteenth qualifier ===
First round
13 | (Spain) Albert Montañés | 6 | 6
(Argentina) Diego Hipperdinger | 3 | 0
WC | (France) Jérôme Haehnel | 6 | 4 | 6
(France) Sébastien De Chaunac | 4 | 6 | 1
(Uzbekistan) Vadim Kutsenko | 3 | 6 | 3
(Sweden) Fredrik Jonsson | 6 | 1 | 6
(United Kingdom) Barry Cowan | 3 | 6^{3}
26 | (Spain) Emilio Benfele Álvarez | 6 | 7^{7}

Second round
13 | (Spain) Albert Montañés | 6 | 7^{7}
WC | (France) Jérôme Haehnel | 0 | 6^{3}
(Sweden) Fredrik Jonsson | 6 | 6
26 | (Spain) Emilio Benfele Álvarez | 3 | 1

Qualifying competition
13 | (Spain) Albert Montañés | 6 | 6
(Sweden) Fredrik Jonsson | 3 | 2

=== Fourteenth qualifier ===
First round
14 | (Germany) Markus Hantschk | 5 | 6 | 4
(Italy) Elia Grossi | 7 | 1 | 6
(Czech Republic) Jan Hernych | 6 | 6
(Czech Republic) Petr Kralert | 2 | 3
(Italy) Stefano Tarallo | 6 | 6
(Italy) Vincenzo Santopadre | 3 | 4
(South Africa) Marcos Ondruska | 3 | 6 | 7
22 | (Peru) Luis Horna | 6 | 3 | 5

Second round
(Italy) Elia Grossi | 3 | 4
(Czech Republic) Jan Hernych | 6 | 6
(Italy) Stefano Tarallo | 4 | 5
(South Africa) Marcos Ondruska | 6 | 7

Qualifying competition
(Czech Republic) Jan Hernych | 2 | 6 | 4
(South Africa) Marcos Ondruska | 6 | 4 | 6

=== Fifteenth qualifier ===
First round
15 | (Hungary) Attila Sávolt | 6 | 6
(Argentina) Martín Rodríguez | 1 | 1
WC | (France) Jean-Christophe Faurel | 1 | 6 | 3
(Spain) Feliciano López | 6 | 4 | 6
WC | (France) Thierry Ascione | 6 | 6^{4} | 6
(United Kingdom) Jamie Delgado | 2 | 7^{7} | 3
(Zimbabwe) Wayne Black | 1 | 4
21 | (Romania) Adrian Voinea | 6 | 6

Second round
15 | (Hungary) Attila Sávolt | 4 | 5
(Spain) Feliciano López | 6 | 7
WC | (France) Thierry Ascione | 0 | 2
21 | (Romania) Adrian Voinea | 6 | 6

Qualifying competition
(Spain) Feliciano López | 6 | 3 | 9
21 | (Romania) Adrian Voinea | 4 | 6 | 7

=== Sixteenth qualifier ===
First round
16 | (Argentina) David Nalbandian | 6 | 6^{4} | 4
(Norway) Christian Ruud | 3 | 7^{7} | 6
(Israel) Noam Behr | 7^{7} | 4
(Austria) Zbynek Mlynarik | 6^{5} | 1^{r}
(Austria) Clemens Trimmel | 6 | 7^{7}
(Argentina) Patricio Arquez | 4 | 6^{5}
(United States) Glenn Weiner | 6 | 1 | 0
30 | (United States) James Blake | 2 | 6 | 6

Second round
(Norway) Christian Ruud | 1 | 6 | 10
(Israel) Noam Behr | 6 | 4 | 8
(Austria) Clemens Trimmel | 7 | 6
30 | (United States) James Blake | 5 | 2

Qualifying competition
(Norway) Christian Ruud | 6 | 3 | 6
(Austria) Clemens Trimmel | 4 | 6 | 2
