= Igor Brukner =

Czech tennis player (born 1979)

- Country (sports): Czech Republic
- Born: 4 October 1979 (age 45); Czech Republic
- Retired: 2005
- Plays: Right-handed
- Prize money: $16,516

Singles
- Career record: 0–0
- Career titles: 0; 0 Challenger, 1 Futures
- Highest ranking: No. 520 (14 August 2000)

Doubles
- Career record: 0–0
- Career titles: 0; 1 Challenger, 11 Futures
- Highest ranking: No. 259 (14 May 2001)
- Last updated on: 7 May 2021.

Igor Brukner (born 4 October 1979) is a retired Czech professional tennis player.

Brukner reached a career-high ATP singles ranking of World No. 520 achieved on 14 August 2000, and a career-high ATP doubles ranking of World No. 259 achieved on 14 May 2001. He never qualified nor received direct entry for an ATP Tour main draw match, thus playing exclusively on the ATP Challenger Tour and ITF Futures Tour, the latter being the most prevalent.

Brukner reached 1 career singles final on the ITF Futures Circuit and won the title at the 2001 Slovakia F5 futures tournament. Additionally, he reached 13 career doubles finals with a record of 12 wins and 1 loss including a 1–0 record in ATP Challenger Tour finals. He won the 2001 Kamnik ATP Challenger tournament held on clay courts in Slovenia alongside compatriot Jaroslav Levinsky defeating Salvador Navarro-Gutierrez and Vincenzo Santopadre by a score of 6–3, 1–6, 6–4.

Brukner served as head coach for former WTA player Klára Koukalová also from the Czech Republoc, who reached World No. 20 in the singles rankings and won 7 career WTA titles.

== ATP Challenger and ITF Futures finals ==
=== Singles: 1 (1–0) ===
Legend ATP Challenger (0–0) ITF Futures (1–0)	Finals by surface Hard (0–0) Clay (1–0) Grass (0–0) Carpet (0–0)

Result	W–L	Date	Tournament	Tier	Surface	Opponent	Score
Win	1–0	Jul 2001	Slovakia F5, Bratislava	Futures	Clay	(Slovakia) Juraj Hasko	7–5, 3–6, 6–3

=== Doubles: 13 (12–1) ===
Legend ATP Challenger (1–0) ITF Futures (11–1)	Finals by surface Hard (2–0) Clay (10–1) Grass (0–0) Carpet (0–0)

Result	W–L	Date	Tournament	Tier	Surface	Partner	Opponents	Score
Win	1–0	Jul 2000	Hungary F3, Budapest	Futures	Clay	(Austria) Oliver Marach	(Hungary) Marton Ott (Hungary) Zoltan Nagy	6–4, 2–6, 6–3
Loss	1–1	Jul 2000	Georgia F1, Tbilisi	Futures	Clay	(Slovakia) Martin Hromec	(Kazakhstan) Alexey Kedryuk (Ukraine) Orest Tereshchuk	6–7^{(5–7)}, 4–6
Win	2–1	Jul 2000	Georgia F2, Tbilisi	Futures	Clay	(Slovakia) Martin Hromec	(Russia) Kirill Ivanov-Smolensky (Russia) Artem Derepasko	6–2, 6–7^{(5–7)}, 7–6^{(8–6)}
Win	3–1	Aug 2000	Hungary F6, Budapest	Futures	Clay	(Slovakia) Oliver Marach	(Greece) Konstantinos Economidis (Greece) Anastasios Vasiliadis	6–4, 6–4
Win	4–1	Sep 2000	Poland F4, Łódź	Futures	Clay	(Czech Republic) Petr Dezort	(Czech Republic) Jan Hájek (Slovakia) Marian Leysek	6–1, 6–4
Win	5–1	Sep 2000	Czech Republic F1, Znojmo	Futures	Clay	(Slovakia) Martin Hromec	(Austria) Ronald Dueller (Germany) Christopher Kas	3–6, 6–1, 6–4
Win	6–1	Oct 2000	France F22, Saint-Dizier	Futures	Hard	(Slovakia) Martin Hromec	(Austria) Ronald Dueller (Belgium) Nick Beirnaert	6–3, 7–6^{(7–3)}
Win	7–1	Apr 2001	Kuwait F1, Mishref	Futures	Hard	(Slovakia) Martin Hromec	(Mauritius) Kamil Patel (Netherlands) Rogier Wassen	6–4, 6–3
Win	8–1	Jul 2001	Slovenia F3, Kranj	Futures	Clay	(Czech Republic) Josef Neštický	(Slovakia) Karol Beck (Slovakia) Branislav Sekáč	6–4, 7–5
Win	9–1	Aug 2001	Latvia F1, Jūrmala	Futures	Clay	(Croatia) Ivan Cerović	(Finland) Lauri Kiiski (Finland) Tero Vilen	5–7, 6–4, 7–5
Win	10–1	Sep 2001	Kamnik, Slovenia	Challenger	Clay	(Czech Republic) Jaroslav Levinský	(Spain) Salvador Navarro-Gutierrez (Italy) Vincenzo Santopadre	6–3, 1–6, 6–4
Win	11–1	Jul 2002	Slovakia F2, Prievidza	Futures	Clay	(Czech Republic) Jan Hájek	(Slovakia) František Babej (Slovakia) Branislav Sekáč	6–3, 4–3 ret.
Win	12–1	Jul 2002	Slovakia F3, Nové Zámky	Futures	Clay	(Czech Republic) Jan Hájek	(Belarus) Vitali Shvets (Russia) Nikolay Mishin	7–5, 7–6^{(7–4)}
