= Diego Hipperdinger =

Argentine-Spanish tennis player

- Country (sports): Argentina; Spain
- Born: 17 January 1977 (age 48); Olavarría, Argentina
- Prize money: $65,704

Singles
- Career record: 0–1
- Highest ranking: No. 177 (20 August 2001)

Grand Slam singles results
- French Open: Q1 (2001)
- Wimbledon: Q1 (2001)

Doubles
- Highest ranking: No. 313 (15 September 2003)

Diego Hipperdinger (born 17 January 1977) is an Argentine-Spanish former professional tennis player. A native of Olavarría in Argentina, Hipperdinger was based in Barcelona for much of his career. He originally competed on tour as an Argentine, before adopting Spanish nationality in the early 2000s.

== Biography ==
Hipperdinger, who reached a career high ranking of 177 in the world, made his only ATP Tour main draw appearance at the 1998 Torneo Godó. In 2001 he featured in the qualifying draws for both the French Open and Wimbledon. He won one Challenger title.

While competing in the qualifying rounds at Viña del Mar in 2004, Hipperdinger tested positive for cocaine and received a two-year suspension from tennis. He unsuccessfully appealed to the Court of Arbitration for Sport (CAS) by claiming he had drunken coca tea and chewed coca leaves to help with altitude sickness, while unaware that cocaine was derived from the coca plant.

== Challenger titles ==
=== Singles: (1) ===
| Year | Tournament | Surface | Opponent | Score |
|---|---|---|---|---|
| 2001 | Mantua, Italy | Clay | (France) Jean-Baptiste Perlant | 4–6, 6–4, 6–3 |
