= Karol Beck =

Slovak professional tennis player

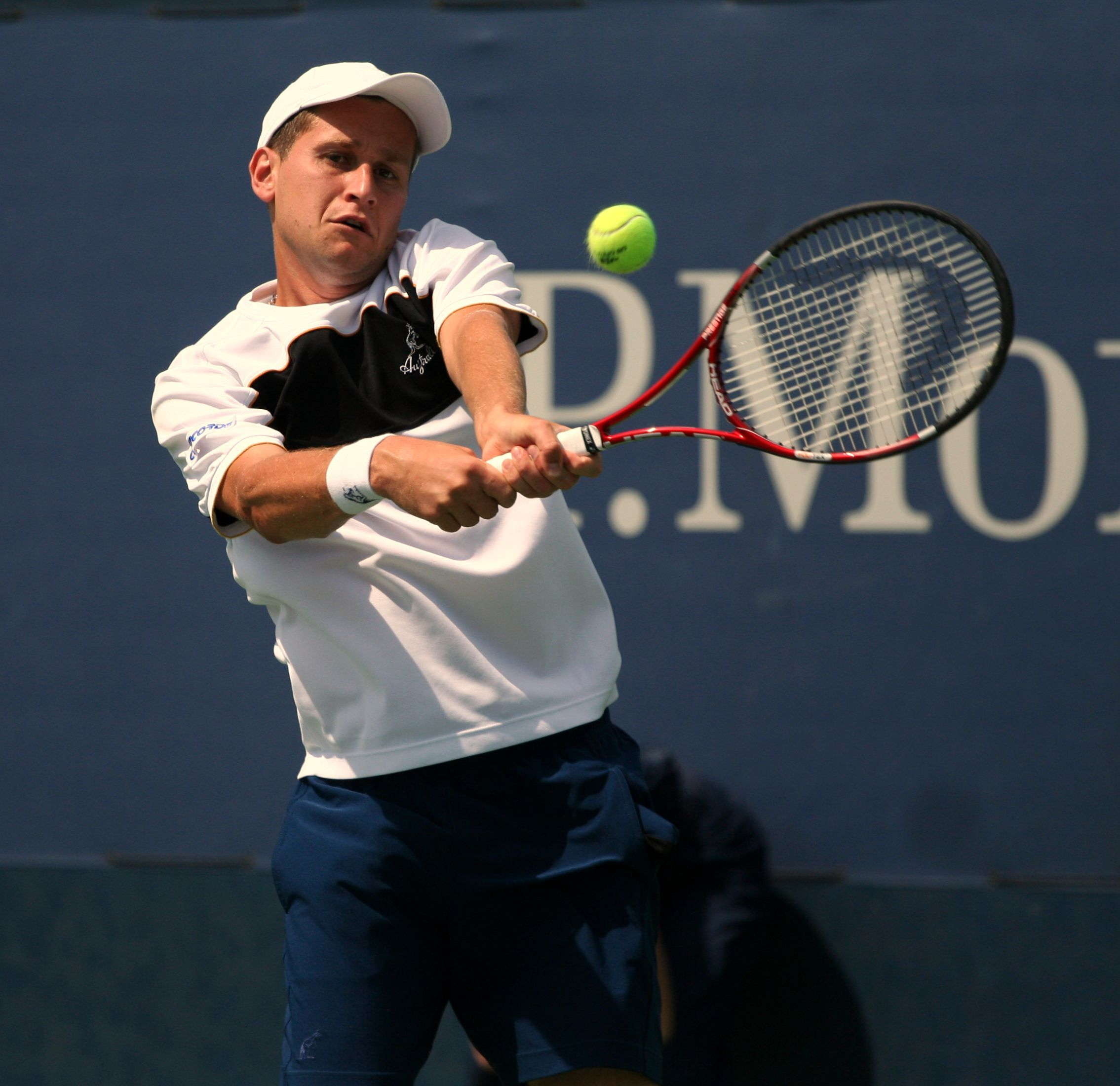
- Country (sports): Slovakia
- Residence: Zvolen, Slovakia
- Born: 3 April 1982 (age 44) Zvolen, Czechoslovakia
- Height: 1.80 m (5 ft 11 in)
- Turned pro: 2001
- Retired: 2018 (last match in 2020)
- Plays: Right-handed (two-handed backhand)
- Prize money: $2,110,846

Singles
- Career record: 65–116
- Career titles: 0
- Highest ranking: No. 36 (22 August 2005)

Grand Slam singles results
- Australian Open: 3R (2005)
- French Open: 1R (2003, 2004, 2005, 2010, 2012)
- Wimbledon: 3R (2004, 2011)
- US Open: 4R (2004)

Doubles
- Career record: 33–51
- Career titles: 0
- Highest ranking: No. 62 (17 October 2010)
- Last updated on: 22 October 2018.

Karol Beck (born 3 April 1982) is a tennis coach and a former professional player from Slovakia. His career-high singles ranking is World No. 36, achieved in August 2005. Beck reached the fourth round of the 2004 US Open and the quarterfinals of the 2005 Montreal Masters, defeating Nikolay Davydenko en route to both runs.

== Career ==
On 25 October 2004, Beck lost in the final of the St. Petersburg Open to Mikhail Youzhny 6–2, 6–2.

On 13 February 2006 the International Tennis Federation (ITF) announced Beck had tested positive for clenbuterol during the 2005 Davis Cup semifinal for Slovakia against Argentina, which Slovakia won 4–1. As a consequence, the ITF suspended him from the game for two years until 31 October 2007.

=== 2007 ===
Beck finished serving his suspension and began playing again in November as an unranked player. He had to go through qualifying rounds in every tournament.

Without a ranking, he chose the Tunis challenger as his first tournament to qualify in. He qualified and won his first round match to get his first ranking points. The next week, he had a wild card entry into qualifying for the Dnipropetrovsk challenger, and qualified to pick up some more points.

He qualified a couple more times at challengers and futures tournaments before winning his final tournament of 2007, the Czech F6 Futures, to finish up the year at No. 581, after playing in just 5 tournaments.

=== 2008 ===
He began 2008 from where he left off in 2007, qualifying into and winning his first tournament, Germany's F1 Futures, to get into the top-500.

=== 2009 ===
Beck took part in the Wimbledon 2009, ranked as 143rd in the world. He was a lucky loser due to the withdrawal of then-World No. 1, Rafael Nadal. He was drawn against 21st seed Feliciano López in the first round and won a thrilling five set encounter 1–6, 7–5, 6–3, 4–6, 10–8 to reach the second round of a grand slam tournament for the first time since the 2005 Australian Open. In the second round, he would meet another Spaniard, this being Nicolás Almagro. He played another 5-setter, but this time, he lost 4–6, 6–7, 6–3, 6–3, 5–7.

== ATP career finals ==
=== Singles: 1 (0–1) ===
Legend
Grand Slam (0–0)
ATP World Tour Finals (0–0)
ATP World Tour Masters 1000 (0–0)
ATP World Tour 500 Series (0–0)
ATP World Tour 250 Series (0–1)

Result	No.	Date	Tournament	Surface	Opponent	Score
Loss	1.	Oct 2004	St. Petersburg, Russia	Carpet (i)	(Russia) Mikhail Youzhny	2–6, 2–6

=== Doubles: 2 (0–2) ===
Legend
Grand Slam (0–0)
ATP World Tour Finals (0–0)
ATP World Tour Masters 1000 (0–0)
ATP World Tour 500 Series (0–0)
ATP World Tour 250 Series (0–2)

Result	No.	Date	Tournament	Surface	Partner	Opponents	Score
Loss	1.	Feb 2010	Johannesburg, South Africa	Hard	(Israel) Harel Levy	(India) Rohan Bopanna (Pakistan) Aisam-ul-Haq Qureshi	2–6, 6–3, [10–5]
Loss	2.	Jun 2010	London, United Kingdom	Grass	(Czech Republic) David Škoch	(Serbia) Novak Djokovic (Israel) Jonathan Erlich	6–7^{(6–8)}, 6–2, [10–3]

== Challenger and Futures Finals ==
=== Singles: 32 (17–15) ===
Legend (singles) ATP Challenger Tour (10–11) ITF Futures Tour (7–4)	Titles by surface Hard (9–9) Clay (2–1) Grass (2–2) Carpet (4–3)

Result	W–L	Date	Tournament	Tier	Surface	Opponent	Score
Loss	0–1	Feb 2001	Croatia F2, Zagreb	Futures	Hard	(Croatia) Lovro Zovko	5–7, 4–6
Loss	0–2	Aug 2001	Togliatti, Russia	Challenger	Hard	(Austria) Alexander Peya	2–6, 2–6
Win	1–2	Aug 2001	Russia F3, Balashikha	Futures	Clay	(Ukraine) Orest Tereshchuk	6–2, 6–3
Win	2–2	Apr 2002	Greece F2, Kalamata	Futures	Hard	(Federal Republic of Yugoslavia) Janko Tipsarević	6–1, 6–4
Win	3–2	Jul 2002	Bristol, England	Challenger	Grass	(Austria) Alexander Peya	6–0, 6–3
Loss	3–3	Jul 2002	Manchester, England	Challenger	Grass	(Belarus) Vladimir Voltchkov	4–6, 6–7^{(2–7)}
Loss	3–4	Nov 2002	Bratislava, Slovakia	Challenger	Carpet	(France) Antony Dupuis	6–4, 4–6, 6–7^{(1–7)}
Win	4–4	Jan 2003	Heilbronn, Germany	Challenger	Carpet	(Austria) Jürgen Melzer	6–2, 5–7, 7–6^{(7–5)}
Loss	4–5	Feb 2003	Andrezieux, France	Challenger	Hard (i)	(France) Thierry Ascione	4–6, 2–6
Win	5–5	Feb 2004	Wrocław, Poland	Challenger	Hard (i)	(Czech Republic) Jan Hernych	6–7^{(4–7)}, 6–2, 6–2
Win	6–5	Jun 2004	Surbiton, England	Challenger	Grass	(South Africa) Wesley Moodie	6–4, 6–4
Win	7–5	Mar 2005	Sunrise, United States	Challenger	Hard	(Italy) Davide Sanguinetti	6–2, 6–2
Win	8–5	Dec 2007	Czech Republic F6, Opava	Futures	Carpet	(Czech Republic) Lukáš Rosol	2–6, 7–5, 7–5
Win	9–5	Jan 2008	Germany F1, Nussloch	Futures	Carpet	(France) Sébastien de Chaunac	6–4, 6–4
Loss	9–6	Oct 2008	Kolding, Denmark	Challenger	Hard (i)	(Croatia) Roko Karanušić	4–6, 4–6
Loss	9–7	Nov 2008	Helsinki, Finland	Challenger	Hard (i)	(Russia) Dmitry Tursunov	4–6, 3–6
Loss	9–8	Jan 2009	Heilbronn, Germany	Challenger	Hard (i)	(Germany) Benjamin Becker	4–6, 4–6
Win	10–8	Jul 2009	Pozoblanco, Spain	Challenger	Hard	(Brazil) Thiago Alves	6–4, 6–3
Win	11–8	Feb 2010	Bergamo, Italy	Challenger	Hard (i)	(Luxembourg) Gilles Müller	6–4, 6–4
Win	12–8	Feb 2010	Belgrade, Serbia	Challenger	Carpet	(Serbia) Ilija Bozoljac	7–5, 7–6^{(7–4)}
Loss	12–9	Mar 2010	Sarajevo, Bosnia & Herzegovina	Challenger	Hard (i)	(France) Édouard Roger-Vasselin	7–6^{(7–5)}, 3–6, 0–1 ret.
Win	13–9	Oct 2010	Tashkent, Uzbekistan	Challenger	Hard	(Luxembourg) Gilles Müller	6–7^{(4–7)}, 6–4, 7–5
Loss	13–10	Mar 2011	Sarajevo, Bosnia & Herzegovina	Challenger	Hard (I)	(Bosnia and Herzegovina) Amer Delić	walkover
Win	14–10	Aug 2011	Segovia, Spain	Challenger	Hard	(France) Grégoire Burquier	6–4, 7–6^{(7–4)}
Loss	14–11	Nov 2011	Eckental, Germany	Challenger	Carpet	(United States) Rajeev Ram	4–6, 2–6
Loss	14–12	Jun 2012	Nottingham, Great Britain	Challenger	Grass	(Slovenia) Grega Žemlja	6–7^{(3–7)}, 6–4, 4–6
Loss	14–13	Nov 2013	Czech Republic F6, Jablonec nad Nisou	Futures	Carpet	(Belarus) Uladzimir Ignatik	2–6, 3–6
Loss	14–14	Jan 2014	Germany F2, Stuttgart	Futures	Hard	(Belarus) Uladzimir Ignatik	6–4, 3–6, 6–7^{(3–7)}
Win	15–14	March 2014	France F7, Saint-Raphaël	Futures	Hard	(Belgium) Maxime Authom	7–6^{(11–9)}, 6–4
Win	16–14	Apr 2014	Turkey F10, Antalya	Futures	Hard	(Croatia) Mate Delić	6–7^{(5–7)}, 6–3, 6–3
Loss	16–15	Jul 2014	Austria F5, Bad Waltersdorf	Futures	Clay	(Czech Republic) Dušan Lojda	3–6, 7–5, 4–6
Win	17–15	Aug 2014	Slovakia F3, Piešťany	Futures	Clay	(Slovakia) Ivo Klec	6–4, 7–6^{(7–4)}

=== Doubles: 43 (27–16) ===
Legend (singles) ATP Challenger Tour (19–9) ITF Futures Tour (8–7)	Titles by surface Hard (16–11) Clay (8–5) Grass (1–0) Carpet (2–0)

Result	W–L	Date	Tournament	Tier	Surface	Partner	Opponents	Score
Win	1–0	Sep 2000	Slovak Republic Masters, Piešťany	Satellites	Clay	(Slovakia) Igor Zelenay	(Slovakia) Branislav Sekáč (Czech Republic) Martin Štěpánek	6–3, 2–6, 7–6^{(7–3)}
Win	2–0	Oct 2000	Finland F2, Helsinki	Futures	Carpet	(Slovakia) Igor Zelenay	(Finland) Jarkko Nieminen (Finland) Tero Vilen	6–2, 6–4
Loss	2–1	Nov 2000	United States F28, Malibu	Futures	Hard	(Slovakia) Igor Zelenay	(Finland) Lassi Ketola (Finland) Kim Tiilikainen	4–6, 6–7^{(3–7)}
Win	3–1	Dec 2000	United States F29, Laguna Niguel	Futures	Hard	(France) Cedric Kauffmann	(United States) Kelly Gullett (Netherlands) Djalmar Sistermans	6–2, 6–3
Win	4–1	Jun 2001	Czech Republic F2, Jablonec nad Nisou	Futures	Clay	(Slovakia) Branislav Sekáč	(Slovakia) Martin Hromec (Czech Republic) Martin Štěpánek	6–3, 3–6, 6–2
Loss	4–2	Jun 2001	Slovenia F3, Kranj	Futures	Clay	(Slovakia) Branislav Sekáč	(Czech Republic) Igor Brukner (Czech Republic) Josef Neštický	4–6, 5–7
Win	5–2	Jul 2001	Oberstaufen, Germany	Challenger	Clay	(Slovakia) Branislav Sekáč	(Austria) Thomas Strengberger (Austria) Clemens Trimmel	2–6, 6–1, 6–0
Win	6–2	Aug 2001	Togliatti, Russia	Challenger	Hard	(Slovakia) Igor Zelenay	(Uzbekistan) Abdul Hamid Makhkamov (Uzbekistan) Dmitriy Tomashevich	7–5, 4–6, 6–3
Win	7–2	Aug 2001	Russia F1, Balashikha	Futures	Clay	(Slovakia) Igor Zelenay	(Kazakhstan) Alexey Kedryuk (Ukraine) Orest Tereshchuk	0–6, 6–3, 6–4
Loss	7–3	Sep 2001	Zabrze, Poland	Challenger	Clay	(Slovakia) Igor Zelenay	(Austria) Julian Knowle (Germany) Michael Kohlmann	1–6, 6–7^{(5–7)}
Loss	7–4	Nov 2001	Prague, Czech Republic	Challenger	Hard	(Slovakia) Igor Zelenay	(Czech Republic) Lukáš Dlouhý (Czech Republic) David Miketa	1–6, 6–4, 3–6
Loss	7–5	Jan 2002	United States F2, Delray Beach	Futures	Hard	(Slovakia) Ladislav Švarc	(United States) Graydon Oliver (United States) Travis Rettenmaier	2–6, 4–6
Win	8–5	Mar 2002	Osaka, Japan	Challenger	Hard	(France) Cedric Kauffmann	(Italy) Laurence Tieleman (Netherlands) JohnVan Lottum	7–5, 6–1
Loss	8–6	Apr 2002	Greece F1, Syros	Futures	Hard	(Slovakia) Michal Mertiňák	(France) Thierry Ascione (France) Florent Serra	6–3, 4–6, 2–6
Win	9–6	Apr 2002	Greece F2, Kalamata	Futures	Hard	(Slovakia) Michal Mertiňák	(Finland) Tapio Nurminen (Slovenia) Marko Tkalec	6–1, 6–2
Win	10–6	May 2002	Budapest, Hungary	Challenger	Clay	(Czech Republic) Jaroslav Levinský	(Argentina) Mariano Hood (Argentina) Sebastián Prieto	3–6, 6–4, 6–1
Win	11–6	Jul 2002	Manchester, Great Britain	Challenger	Grass	(Pakistan) Aisam Qureshi	(Hong Kong) John Hui (Australia) Anthony Ross	6–3, 7–6^{(7–2)}
Loss	11–7	Aug 2002	Segovia, Spain	Challenger	Hard	(Netherlands) Sander Groen	(Australia) Tim Crichton (Australia) Todd Perry	7–5, 6–7^{(3–7)}, 4–6
Loss	11–8	Aug 2002	Bronx, United States	Challenger	Hard	(Czech Republic) Tomáš Zíb	(United Kingdom) Jamie Delgado (United Kingdom) Arvind Parmar	6–7^{(6–8)}, 1–6
Win	12–8	Nov 2002	Prague, Czech Republic	Challenger	Hard	(Czech Republic) Jaroslav Levinský	(North Macedonia) Aleksandar Kitinov (Croatia) Lovro Zovko	7–5, 6–2
Win	13–8	May 2004	Zagreb, Croatia	Challenger	Clay	(Czech Republic) Jaroslav Levinský	(Australia) Jordan Kerr (Belgium) Tom Vanhoudt	6–2, 7–6^{(7–4)}
Win	14–8	Nov 2004	Dnipropetrovsk, Ukraine	Challenger	Hard	(Czech Republic) Jaroslav Levinský	(Romania) Andrei Pavel (Romania) Gabriel Trifu	6–7^{(4–7)}, 7–6^{(7–4)}, 7–6^{(7–2)}
Win	15–8	Feb 2009	Heilbronn, Germany	Challenger	Hard	(Czech Republic) Jaroslav Levinský	(Germany) Benedikt Dorsch (Germany) Philipp Petzschner	6–3, 6–2
Win	16–8	Mar 2009	Besançon, France	Challenger	Hard	(Czech Republic) Jaroslav Levinský	(Czech Republic) David Škoch (Slovenia) Igor Zelenay	2–6, 7–5, [10–7]
Win	17–8	Mar 2009	Bergamo, Italy	Challenger	Hard	(Czech Republic) Jaroslav Levinský	(South Africa) Chris Haggard (Czech Republic) Pavel Vízner	7–6^{(8–6)}, 6–4
Win	18–8	May 2009	Rhodes, Greece	Challenger	Hard	(Czech Republic) Jaroslav Levinský	(United States) Rajeev Ram (United States) Bobby Reynolds	6–3, 6–3
Win	19–8	Jul 2009	Pozoblanco, Spain	Challenger	Hard	(Czech Republic) Jaroslav Levinský	(United Kingdom) Colin Fleming (United Kingdom) Ken Skupski	2–6, 7–6^{(7–5)}, [10–7]
Loss	19–9	Feb 2010	Bergamo, Italy	Challenger	Hard	(Czech Republic) Jiří Krkoška	(United Kingdom) Jonathan Marray (United Kingdom) Jamie Murray	1–6, 7–6^{(7–2)}, [8–10]
Loss	19–10	May 2010	Bordeaux, France	Challenger	Clay	(Czech Republic) Leoš Friedl	(France) Nicolas Mahut (France) Édouard Roger-Vasselin	7–5, 3–6, [7–10]
Win	20–10	Sep 2010	Trnava, Slovakie	Challenger	Clay	(Czech Republic) Lukáš Rosol	(Austria) Alexander Peya (Austria) Martin Slanar	4–6, 7–6^{(7–3)}, [10–8]
Loss	20–11	Oct 2010	Tashkent, Uzbekistan	Challenger	Hard	(Czech Republic) Filip Polášek	(United Kingdom) Ross Hutchins (United Kingdom) Jamie Murray	6–2, 4–6, [8–10]
Win	21–11	Jul 2011	Granby, Canada	Challenger	Hard	(France) Édouard Roger-Vasselin	(Germany) Matthias Bachinger (Germany) Frank Moser	6–1, 6–3
Loss	21–12	Jul 2012	Astana, Kazakhstan	Challenger	Hard	(Slovakia) Kamil Čapkovič	(Russia) Konstantin Kravchuk (Ukraine) Denys Molchanov	4–6, 3–6
Win	22–12	Sep 2012	Istanbul, Turkey	Challenger	Hard	(Czech Republic) Lukáš Dlouhý	(Spain) Adrián Menéndez Maceiras (Australia) John Peers	3–6, 6–2, [10–6]
Win	23–12	Nov 2012	Ortisei, Italy	Challenger	Carpet	(South Africa) Rik de Voest	(Australia) Rameez Junaid (Germany) Michael Kohlmann	6–3, 6–4
Win	24–12	Feb 2013	Bergamo, Italy	Challenger	Hard	(Slovakia) Andrej Martin	(Italy) Claudio Grassi (Israel) Amir Weintraub	6–3, 3–6, [10–8]
Loss	24–13	Mar 2013	Sarajevo, Bosnia and Herzegovina	Challenger	Hard	(Slovakia) Mirza Bašić	(Bosnia and Herzegovina) Konstantin Kravchuk (Bosnia and Herzegovina) Tomislav Brkić	3–6, 5–7
Win	25–13	Feb 2014	Bergamo, Italy	Challenger	Hard	(Slovakia) Michal Mertiňák	(Russia) Konstantin Kravchuk (Ukraine) Denys Molchanov	4–6, 7–5, [10–6]
Win	26–13	Apr 2014	Turkey F10, Antalya	Futures	Hard	(Austria) Maximilian Neuchrist	(United Kingdom) George Coupland (Germany) Andreas Mies	6–2, 6–3
Win	27–13	Aug 2014	Slovakia F3, Piešťany	Futures	Clay	(Ukraine) Filipp Kekercheni	(Ukraine) Danylo Kalenichenko (Portugal) Gonçalo Oliveira	6–2, 2–6, [10–8]
Loss	27–14	Aug 2014	Slovakia F4, Trnava	Futures	Clay	(Ukraine) Filipp Kekercheni	(Czech Republic) Jakub Filipsky (Czech Republic) Jan Šátral	3–6, 2–6
Loss	27–15	Jul 2016	Slovakia F1, Trnava	Futures	Clay	(Russia) Artem Dubrivnyy	(Ukraine) Danylo Kalenichenko (Ukraine) Filipp Kekercheni	0–6, 1–6
Loss	27–16	Nov 2016	Estonia F3, Tallinn	Futures	Hard	(Russia) Artem Dubrivnyy	(Netherlands) Niels Lootsma (Netherlands) BoticVan de Zandschulp	

== Performance timelines ==
Key
W	F	SF	QF	#R	RR	Q#	DNQ	A	NH

(W) winner; (F) finalist; (SF) semifinalist; (QF) quarterfinalist; (#R) rounds 4, 3, 2, 1; (RR) round-robin stage; (Q#) qualification round; (DNQ) did not qualify; (A) absent; (NH) not held; (SR) strike rate (events won / competed); (W–L) win–loss record.

=== Singles ===
Tournament	2002	2003	2004	2005	2006	2007	2008	2009	2010	2011	2012	2013	W–L
Grand Slam tournaments
Australian Open	A	1R	2R	3R	A	A	A	Q2	Q1	1R	1R	A	3–5
French Open	A	1R	1R	1R	A	A	A	Q1	1R	A	1R	A	0–5
Wimbledon	2R	1R	3R	1R	A	A	Q1	2R	2R	3R	1R	Q2	7–8
US Open	A	1R	4R	1R	A	A	Q2	1R	Q1	1R	1R	Q1	3–6
Win–loss	1–1	0–4	6–4	2–4	0–0	0–0	0–0	1–2	1–2	2–3	0–4	0–0	13–24
Career statistics
Titles–Finals	0–0	0–0	0–1	0–0	0–0	0–2	0–0	0–0	0–0	0–0	0–0	0–0	0–1
Year-end ranking	117	66	44	57	N/A	582	145	114	103	101	141	360	

=== Doubles ===
Tournament	2002	2003	2004	2005	2006	2007	2008	2009	2010	2011	W–L
Grand Slam tournaments
Australian Open	A	A	1R	3R	A	A	A	A	A	A	2–2
French Open	A	1R	2R	2R	A	A	A	A	A	A	2–3
Wimbledon	1R	2R	A	3R	A	A	A	1R	1R	1R	3–6
US Open	A	A	2R	2R	A	A	A	A	A	A	2–2
Win–loss	0–1	1–2	2–3	6–4	0–0	0–0	0–0	1–1	1–1	1–1	12–13

== See also ==
- List of sportspeople sanctioned for doping offences
