= Julien Cuaz =

French tennis player

- Country (sports): France
- Born: 17 March 1977 (age 48)
- Prize money: $31,493

Singles
- Highest ranking: No. 465 (10 Jul 2000)

Grand Slam singles results
- French Open: Q1 (1996)

Doubles
- Career record: 0–1
- Highest ranking: No. 233 (28 Aug 2000)

Julien Cuaz (born 17 March 1977) is a French former professional tennis player.

A native of Lyon, Cuaz had a best singles world ranking of 465 and played in the qualifying draw at the 1996 French Open. His only ATP Tour main draw appearances was in the doubles at Marseille in 2001 and he made two doubles finals on the ATP Challenger Tour.

Cuaz was one of the coaches of Australian Open boys' singles champion Clément Morel.

== ITF Futures titles ==
=== Singles: (1) ===
No.	Date	Tournament	Surface	Opponent	Score
1.	Jul 1999	France F6, Bourg-en-Bresse	Clay	(United States) Hugo Armando	6–4, 6–4

=== Doubles: (8) ===
No.	Date	Tournament	Surface	Partner	Opponents	Score
1.	Aug 1999	France F9, Toulon	Clay	(France) Olivier Patience	(France) Christophe De Veaux (France) Florent Serra	6–3, 6–4
2.	Sep 1999	France F10, Bagnères-de-Bigorre	Hard	(France) Lionel Roux	(Switzerland) Yves Allegro (Austria) Alexander Peya	6–4, 6–3
3.	Sep 1999	France F11, Mulhouse	Hard	(France) Lionel Roux	(France) Jean-François Bachelot (Germany) Erik Truempler	6–3, 7–6
4.	Jun 2000	Italy F5, Turin	Clay	(France) Guillaume Marx	(Italy) Omar Camporese (Italy) Elia Grossi	6–3, 6–1
5.	Jun 2000	France F11, Noisy-le-Grand	Clay	(Finland) Tommi Lenho	(France) Jérôme Haehnel (France) Vincent Lavergne	4–6, 6–0, 6–0
6.	Jul 2000	France F12, Toulon	Clay	(France) Jean-Baptiste Perlant	(France) Patrice Atias (France) Jerome Sciarrino	6–3, 6–3
7.	Aug 2000	France F16, Valescure	Hard	(France) Benjamin Cassaigne	(Australia) Luke Bourgeois (Australia) Domenic Marafiote	3–5, 5–3, 1–4, 4–2, 4–1
8.	Aug 2002	Spain F8, Dénia	Clay	(Netherlands) Jasper Smit	(Argentina) Antonio Pastorino (Argentina) Cristian Villagrán	3–6, 6–2, 6–4
