= Bobbie Altelaar =

Dutch tennis player

- Full name: Bob Altelaar
- Country (sports): Netherlands
- Born: 7 July 1976 (age 48)
- Plays: Right-handed
- Prize money: $13,473

Singles
- Highest ranking: No. 860 (2 Feb 1998)

Doubles
- Highest ranking: No. 183 (13 May 2002)

Bob Altelaar (born 7 July 1976), also known as Bobbie Altelaar, is a Dutch former professional tennis player.

Altelaar, who comes from Amsterdam, competed best as a doubles player on the international tour, with a career high ranking of 183. In 2001 he partnered with Dennis van Scheppingen to win the Sylt Challenger tournament.

== Challenger/Futures titles ==
Legend
ATP Challenger (1)
ITF Futures (1)

=== Doubles ===
No.	Date	Tournament	Tier	Surface	Partner	Opponents	Score
1.	May 2000	Germany F3, Teurershof	Futures	Clay	(Germany) Jan Weinzierl	(Croatia) Željko Krajan (Croatia) Lovro Zovko	6–4, 7–5
2.	Aug 2001	Sylt Challenger, Sylt, Germany	Challenger	Clay	(Netherlands) Dennis van Scheppingen	(Switzerland) Rico Jacober (New Zealand) Mark Nielsen	7–6^{(3)}, 6–1
