= Elia Grossi =

Italian tennis player

- Country (sports): Italy
- Born: 3 June 1974 (age 50)
- Prize money: $58,983

Singles
- Career record: 0–1
- Highest ranking: No. 212 (9 Jul 2001)

Grand Slam singles results
- French Open: Q2 (2001)
- Wimbledon: Q1 (1998, 2001)

Doubles
- Career record: 0–1
- Highest ranking: No. 249 (28 Aug 2000)

Elia Grossi (born 3 June 1974) is an Italian former professional tennis player.

Grossi, a native of Florence, reached a career high singles ranking of 212. He made his only ATP Tour singles main draw appearance in the 1997 edition of the San Marino Open and featured in the doubles main draw of the 2001 Rome Masters. His sister Marzia played on the WTA Tour.

== ITF Futures titles ==
=== Singles: (3) ===
No.	Date	Tournament	Surface	Opponent	Score
1.	May 1999	Italy F5, Rome	Clay	(Italy) Florian Allgauer	6–2, 1–6, 7–6
2.	Oct 1999	Italy F17, Sardinia	Hard	(Austria) Werner Eschauer	6–4, 0–6, 6–4
3.	Jul 2000	Italy F8, Jesi	Clay	(Italy) Alessio di Mauro	1–4, 4–1, 4–1, 3–5, 4–0

=== Doubles: (2) ===
No.	Date	Tournament	Surface	Partner	Opponents	Score
1.	Jun 2000	Italy F6, Valdengo	Clay	(Italy) Stefano Cobolli	(France) Julien Cuaz (Switzerland) Jean-Claude Scherrer	7–6^{(5)}, 6–3
2.	May 2002	Italy F3, Verona	Clay	(Italy) Stefano Tarallo	(Italy) Massimo Bertolini (Italy) Achille Margotto	6–2, 5–7, 6–3
