= Clemens Trimmel =

Austrian tennis player

- Full name: Clemens Trimmel
- Country (sports): Austria
- Born: 8 June 1978 (age 46); Vienna, Austria
- Height: 1.85 m (6 ft 1 in)
- Turned pro: 1997
- Plays: Right-handed
- Prize money: $97,932

Singles
- Career record: 1–8
- Career titles: 0; 1 Challenger, 5 Futures
- Highest ranking: No. 147 (23 April 2001)

Grand Slam singles results
- Australian Open: Q1 (1996, 2001, 2002)
- French Open: Q3 (2001)

Doubles
- Career record: 1–6
- Career titles: 0; 0 Challenger, 1 Futures
- Highest ranking: No. 419 (16 July 2001)
- Last updated on: 21 November 2022.

Clemens Trimmel (born 8 June 1978) is a former professional tennis player from Austria.

== Biography ==
=== Professional tour ===
Trimmel, a right-handed player from Vienna, was a top-50 ranked junior. He turned professional in 1997 and made several main draw appearances at ATP Tour tournaments. Most notably he had a first-round win over world number 23 Jonas Björkman at St. Pölten in 1997. At the same tournament the following year he narrowly lost to Thomas Muster, 5–7 in the final set. Muster was also his doubles partner at ATP Tour tournaments in Stuttgart and Kitzbühel.

His only Challenger title came in 2000 at the Oberstaufen Cup, where he defeated Radomír Vašek in the final. He was unable to defend his title in 2001 but did have a win over David Ferrer.

At the 2001 French Open he made it to the final round of qualifying, beating James Blake en route.

=== Davis Cup ===
The first of his two Davis Cup appearances for Austria was an away tie to Croatia in 2001. He played in the reverse singles, a dead rubber that he lost to Mario Ančić in a final set tie-break. His second Davis Cup match came in 2002, when Austria hosted Israel in Tyrol. He partnered Alexander Peya in the doubles, which they lost in five sets to Jonathan Erlich and Andy Ram.

In 2012 he was appointed Austria's Davis Cup captain and in his first year took the team to the World Group quarter-finals, for the first time since 1995. The Austrians were relegated in 2013 and after their 2014 campaign, in which they were unable to return to the World Group, Trimmel was replaced by Stefan Koubek. He also captained the Austria Fed Cup team in the 2014 season.

== ATP Challenger and ITF Futures finals ==
=== Singles: 11 (6–5) ===
Legend ATP Challenger (1–4) ITF Futures (5–1)	Finals by surface Hard (0–1) Clay (6–3) Grass (0–0) Carpet (0–1)

Result	W–L	Date	Tournament	Tier	Surface	Opponent	Score
Loss	0–1	Sep 1997	Skopje, Macedonia	Challenger	Clay	(Serbia) Dušan Vemić	3–6, 7–6, 3–6
Loss	0–2	Aug 1998	Nettingsdorf, Austria	Challenger	Clay	(Austria) Markus Hipfl	2–6, 0–6
Loss	0–3	Aug 1999	Morocco F2, Casablanca	Futures	Clay	(Spain) Pedro Rico Garcia	4–6, 6–4, 6–7
Win	1–3	Nov 1999	Cyprus F1, Nicosia	Futures	Clay	(Spain) Óscar Burrieza López	6–3, 6–4
Win	2–3	May 2000	Austria F1, Salzburg	Futures	Clay	(France) Charles-Edouard Maria	6–2, 6–4
Win	3–3	May 2000	Austria F2, Telfs	Futures	Clay	(Austria) Thomas Schiessling	6–4, 6–4
Win	4–3	May 2000	Germany F4, Neckarau	Futures	Clay	(Russia) Nikolay Davydenko	2–6, 6–1, 6–4
Win	5–3	Jun 2000	France F11, Noisy-le-Grand	Futures	Clay	(Spain) Albert Montañés	6–1, 7–6^{(7–5)}
Win	6–3	Jul 2000	Oberstaufen, Germany	Challenger	Clay	(Czech Republic) Radomír Vašek	6–4, 6–1
Loss	6–4	Mar 2001	Cherbourg, France	Challenger	Hard	(Bulgaria) Orlin Stanoytchev	4–6, 6–3, 5–7
Loss	6–5	Mar 2001	Magdeburg, Germany	Challenger	Carpet	(Germany) Axel Pretzsch	4–6, 4–6

=== Doubles: 3 (1–2) ===
Legend ATP Challenger (0–1) ITF Futures (1–1)	Finals by surface Hard (1–0) Clay (0–2) Grass (0–0) Carpet (0–0)

Result	W–L	Date	Tournament	Tier	Surface	Partner	Opponents	Score
Loss	0–1	Feb 2000	France F4, Deauville	Futures	Clay	(France) Jérôme Haehnel	(Spain) Juan Gisbert-Schultze (Spain) Marcos Roy-Girardi	6–4, 4–6, 4–6
Win	1–1	Feb 2000	Croatia F2, Zagreb	Futures	Hard	(Croatia) Ivo Karlović	(Finland) Tapio Nurminen (Finland) Janne Ojala	6–4, 6–4
Loss	1–2	Jul 2001	Oberstaufen, Germany	Challenger	Clay	(Austria) Thomas Strengberger	(Slovakia) Karol Beck (Slovakia) Branislav Sekáč	6–2, 1–6, 0–6

== See also ==
- List of Austria Davis Cup team representatives
