= Patricio Arquez =

Argentine tennis player

- Country (sports): Argentina
- Born: 12 April 1980 (age 45)
- Prize money: $55,233

Singles
- Career record: 0–1 (ATP Tour)
- Highest ranking: No. 222 (10 September 2001)

Grand Slam singles results
- French Open: Q1 (2001)
- Wimbledon: Q1 (2001)

Doubles
- Highest ranking: No. 300 (9 July 2001)

Patricio Arquez (born 12 April 1980) is an Argentine former professional tennis player.

== Tennis career ==
Arquez competed mainly in ATP Challenger and ITF Futures events, reaching a career best singles ranking of 222 in the world. He was runner-up at the Quito Challenger in 2000 and made an ATP Tour main draw appearance in 2001, when he lost in the first round of a tournament in Vina del Mar, as a qualifier.

== ITF Futures titles ==
=== Singles: (2) ===
No.	Date	Tournament	Surface	Opponent	Score
1.	Sep 2000	Bolivia F1, La Paz	Clay	(Chile) Miguel Miranda	6–3, 7–6^{(4)}
2.	Sep 2000	Bolivia F2, Cochabamba	Clay	(Chile) Felipe Parada	6–4, 6–4

=== Doubles: (3) ===
No.	Date	Tournament	Surface	Partner	Opponents	Score
1.	Aug 2000	Peru F1, Lima	Clay	(Argentina) Ignacio González King	(Argentina) Carlos Berlocq (Argentina) Federico Cardinali	7–5, 6–1
2.	Oct 2000	Paraguay F2, Asunción	Clay	(Argentina) Ignacio González King	(Argentina) Daniel Caracciolo (Italy) Nahuel Fracassi	6–3, 6–1
3.	Apr 2003	Chile F1, Santiago	Clay	(Argentina) Sebastián Decoud	(Argentina) Francisco Cabello (Chile) Adrián García	6–2, 7–6^{(6)}

== Personal life ==
Arquez is married to an American fashion designer and the couple have two children.
