= Jérôme Haehnel =

French tennis player (born 1980)

- Country (sports): France
- Residence: Paris, France
- Born: 14 July 1980 (age 46) Mulhouse, France
- Height: 1.85 m (6 ft 1 in)
- Turned pro: 1998
- Retired: 2009
- Plays: Right-handed (two-handed backhand)
- Prize money: $472,122

Singles
- Career record: 8–18
- Career titles: 1
- Highest ranking: No. 78 (21 February 2005)

Grand Slam singles results
- Australian Open: 1R (2005)
- French Open: 2R (2004)
- Wimbledon: 1R (2005)

Doubles
- Career record: 2–7
- Career titles: 0
- Highest ranking: No. 91 (28 May 2007)

Jérôme Haehnel (French: [ʒeʁom enɛl]; born 14 July 1980) is a retired French tennis player who is best known for defeating Andre Agassi in the first round of the French Open in 2004. Haehnel's career-high singles ranking is world No. 78, which he reached in February 2005. Jerome was coached by his wife and has a fear of flying.

== Career highlights ==
=== 1997 ===
Defeated Roger Federer in an ITF match in Venezuela.

=== 2004 ===
Defeated Andre Agassi (Ranked 6th) of the United States in the first round of the French Open in 2004. Won his first and to date only ATP title in Metz by defeating compatriot Richard Gasquet in the final.

=== 2007 ===
During the 2007 Hopman Cup, he defeated Mardy Fish and Mark Philippoussis.

== Performance timelines ==
Key
W	F	SF	QF	#R	RR	Q#	DNQ	A	NH

(W) winner; (F) finalist; (SF) semifinalist; (QF) quarterfinalist; (#R) rounds 4, 3, 2, 1; (RR) round-robin stage; (Q#) qualification round; (DNQ) did not qualify; (A) absent; (NH) not held; (SR) strike rate (events won / competed); (W–L) win–loss record.

=== Singles ===
Tournament	1999	2000	2001	2002	2003	2004	2005	2006	2007	2008	2009	SR	W–L
Grand Slam tournaments
Australian Open	A	A	A	Q1	A	A	1R	A	A	A	A	0 / 1	0–1
French Open	Q1	A	Q2	Q1	Q2	2R	1R	Q1	1R	A	A	0 / 3	1–3
Wimbledon	A	A	A	A	A	A	1R	Q2	Q1	A	A	0 / 1	0–1
US Open	A	A	A	A	A	A	A	A	A	A	A	0 / 0	0–0
Win–loss						1–1	0–3	0–1	0–1	0–0	0–0	0 / 5	1–5
ATP World Tour Masters 1000
Indian Wells Masters	A	A	A	A	A	A	A	A	A	A	A	0 / 0	0–0
Miami Open	A	A	A	A	A	A	A	A	A	A	A	0 / 0	0–0
Monte-Carlo Masters	A	A	A	A	A	Q1	Q1	A	Q2	A	A	0 / 0	0–0
Madrid Open^{1}	A	A	A	A	A	A	A	A	A	A	A	0 / 0	0–0
Italian Open	A	A	A	A	A	A	Q1	A	A	A	A	0 / 0	0–0
Canadian Open	A	A	A	A	A	A	A	A	A	A	A	0 / 0	0–0
Cincinnati Masters	A	A	A	A	A	A	A	A	A	A	A	0 / 0	0–0
Shanghai Masters^{2}	A	A	A	A	A	A	A	A	A	A	A	0 / 0	0–0
Paris Masters	A	A	A	A	A	Q2	Q1	A	Q1	A	A	0 / 0	0–0
Win–loss	0–0	0–0	0–0	0–0	0–0	0–0	0–0	0–0	0–0	0–0	0–0	0 / 0	0–0
Career statistics
	1999	2000	2001	2002	2003	2004	2005	2006	2007	2008	2009	Career	
Tournaments	0	0	0	0	0	4	11	1	2	0	1	19	
Titles / Finals	0 / 0	0 / 0	0 / 0	0 / 0	0 / 0	1 / 1	0 / 0	0 / 0	0 / 0	0 / 0	0 / 0	1 / 1	
Overall win–loss	0–0	0–0	0–0	0–0	0–0	7–3	1–11	0–1	0–2	0–0	0–1	8–18	
Year-end ranking	799	382	291	374	332	93	135	213	240	730	591	31%	

^{1} Held as Hamburg Masters (clay) until 2008, Madrid Masters (clay) 2009–present.

^{2} Held as Stuttgart Masters (indoor carpet) from 1996 to 2002, Madrid Masters (indoor hardcourt) from 2002 to 2008, Shanghai Masters (outdoor hardcourt) 2009–present.

=== Doubles ===
Tournament	2004	2005	2006	2007	2008	2009	SR	W–L
Grand Slam tournaments
Australian Open	A	A	A	A	A	A	0 / 0	0–0
French Open	1R	1R	3R	1R	A	1R	0 / 5	2–5
Wimbledon	A	A	A	Q1	A	A	0 / 0	0–0
US Open	A	A	A	A	A	A	0 / 0	0–0
Win–loss	0–1	0–1	2–1	0–1	0–0	0–1	0 / 5	2–5
Career statistics
	2004	2005	2006	2007	2008	2009	Career	
Tournaments	1	1	1	3	0	1	7	
Titles / Finals	0 / 0	0 / 0	0 / 0	0 / 0	0 / 0	0 / 0	0 / 0	
Overall win–loss	0–1	0–1	2–1	0–3	0–0	0–1	2–7	
Year-end ranking	946	1220	117	213	1032	827	22%	

== Wins over top 10 players ==
#	Player	Rank	Event	Surface	Rd	Score	II Rank
2004
1.	(United States) Andre Agassi	No. 6	French Open, France	Clay	1R	6–4, 7–6^{(7–4)}, 6–3	No. 271

== ATP career finals ==
=== Singles: 1 (1–0) ===
Legend
Grand Slam (0–0)
Tennis Masters Cup (0–0)
ATP Masters Series (0–0)
ATP Tour (1–0)

Result	W/L	Date	Tournament	Surface	Opponent	Score
Win	1–0	Oct 2004	Metz, France	Hard	(France) Richard Gasquet	7–6^{(11–9)}, 6–4

== Challenger and Futures finals ==
=== Singles: 11 (7–4) ===
Legend (singles) ATP Challenger Tour (2–3) ITF Futures Tour (4–9)	Titles by surface Hard (3–7) Clay (2–5) Grass (0–0) Carpet (1–0)

Result	W–L	Date	Tournament	Tier	Surface	Opponent	Score
Loss	0–1	Apr 1998	Germany F3, Riemerling	Futures	Clay	(Germany) Daniel Elsner	0–6, 3–6
Win	1–1	Jul 1998	France F1, Bourg-en-Bresse	Futures	Clay	(United States) Hugo Armando	6–2, 6–2
Loss	1–2	Feb 2000	France F4, Deauville	Futures	Clay (i)	(France) Charles Auffray	2–6, 3–6
Win	2–2	Oct 2000	France F20, Nevers	Futures	Hard (i)	(Israel) Noam Behr	6–7^{(9–11)}, 7–5, 6–3
Win	3–2	Oct 2000	France F21, Forbach	Futures	Carpet (i)	(France) Leslie Demiliani	6–3, 6–3
Loss	3–3	Feb 2001	France F5, Bressuire	Futures	Hard (i)	(Belgium) Jeroen Masson	6–7^{(8–10)}, 6–1, 4–6
Loss	3–4	Oct 2001	France F20, Saint-Dizier	Futures	Hard (i)	(Czech Republic) Michal Kokta	2–6, 3–6
Loss	3–5	Mar 2002	France F6, Lille	Futures	Hard (i)	(Belgium) Kristof Vliegen	6–7^{(3–7)}, 6–7^{(3–7)}
Win	4–5	Feb 2003	France F5, Bressuire	Futures	Hard (i)	(Italy) Uros Vico	6–2, 6–0
Loss	4–6	Jun 2003	Germany F5, Friesenheim	Futures	Clay	(France) Julien Jeanpierre	7–5, 4–6, 5–7
Loss	4–7	Jan 2004	Germany F2, Stuttgart	Futures	Hard (i)	(Poland) Łukasz Kubot	6–7^{(4–7)}, 3–6
Loss	4–8	Feb 2004	France F3, Bressuire	Futures	Hard (i)	(France) Marc Gicquel	6–3, 3–6, 2–6
Loss	4–9	Jun 2004	Lugano, Switzerland	Challenger	Clay	(Spain) Álex Calatrava	2–6, 3–6
Loss	4–10	Aug 2005	Cordenons, Italy	Challenger	Clay	(Argentina) Carlos Berlocq	6–7^{(5–7)}, 4–6
Win	5–10	Oct 2005	Southampton, Great Britain	Challenger	Hard (i)	(Denmark) Kristian Pless	6–2, 6–3
Win	6–10	Aug 2006	Geneva, Switzerland	Challenger	Clay	(Australia) Chris Guccione	7–6^{(7–4)}, 4–6, 6–3
Loss	6–11	Mar 2007	Cherbourg, France	Challenger	Hard (i)	(Italy) Federico Luzzi	5–7, 6–7^{(6–8)}
Loss	6–12	Feb 2008	France F2, Feucherolles	Futures	Hard (i)	(France) Jean-Christophe Faurel	6–3, 3–6, 2–6

=== Doubles: 5 (3–2) ===
Legend (doubles) ATP Challenger Tour (2–3) ITF Futures Tour (0–4)	Titles by surface Hard (0–1) Clay (1–6) Grass (0–0) Carpet (1–0)

Result	W–L	Date	Tournament	Tier	Surface	Partner	Opponents	Score
Loss	0–1	Jul 1998	France F1, Bourg-en-Bresse	Futures	Clay	(France) Michaël Llodra	(United States) Hugo Armando (Argentina) Pablo Bianchi	3–6, 6–1, 2–6
Loss	0–2	Feb 2000	France F4, Deauville	Futures	Clay (i)	(Austria) Clemens Trimmel	(Spain) Juan Gisbert Schultze (Spain) Marcos Roy-Girardi	6–4, 4–6, 4–6
Loss	0–3	Jul 2000	France F11, Noisy-le-Grand	Futures	Clay	(France) Vincent Lavergne	(France) Julien Cuaz (Finland) Tommi Lenho	6–4, 0–6, 0–6
Loss	0–4	Jan 2003	France F1, Grasse	Futures	Clay (i)	(France) Thierry Ascione	(France) Nicolas Mahut (France) Édouard Roger-Vasselin	3–6, 6–1, 2–6
Loss	0–5	Aug 2006	San Marino, San Marino	Challenger	Clay	(France) Julien Jeanpierre	(Argentina) Máximo González (Argentina) Sergio Roitman	3–6, 4–6
Loss	0–6	Sep 2006	Orleans, France	Challenger	Hard (i)	(Monaco) Jean-René Lisnard	(France) Grégory Carraz (Belgium) Dick Norman	6–7^{(6–8)}, 1–6
Win	1–6	Feb 2007	Bergamo, Italy	Challenger	Carpet (i)	(Monaco) Jean-René Lisnard	(Denmark) Kenneth Carlsen (Denmark) Frederik Nielsen	6–3, 2–6, [10–4]
Loss	1–7	Apr 2007	St. Brieuc, France	Challenger	Clay (i)	(France) Jean-Christophe Faurel	(France) Jean-Baptiste Perlant (France) Xavier Pujo	6–2, 2–6, [7–10]
Win	2–7	Jul 2007	Rijeka, Croatia	Challenger	Clay	(Monaco) Jean-René Lisnard	(Slovakia) Ivo Klec (Slovakia) Lukáš Lacko	6–3, 6–4
