= Federico Luzzi =

Italian tennis player

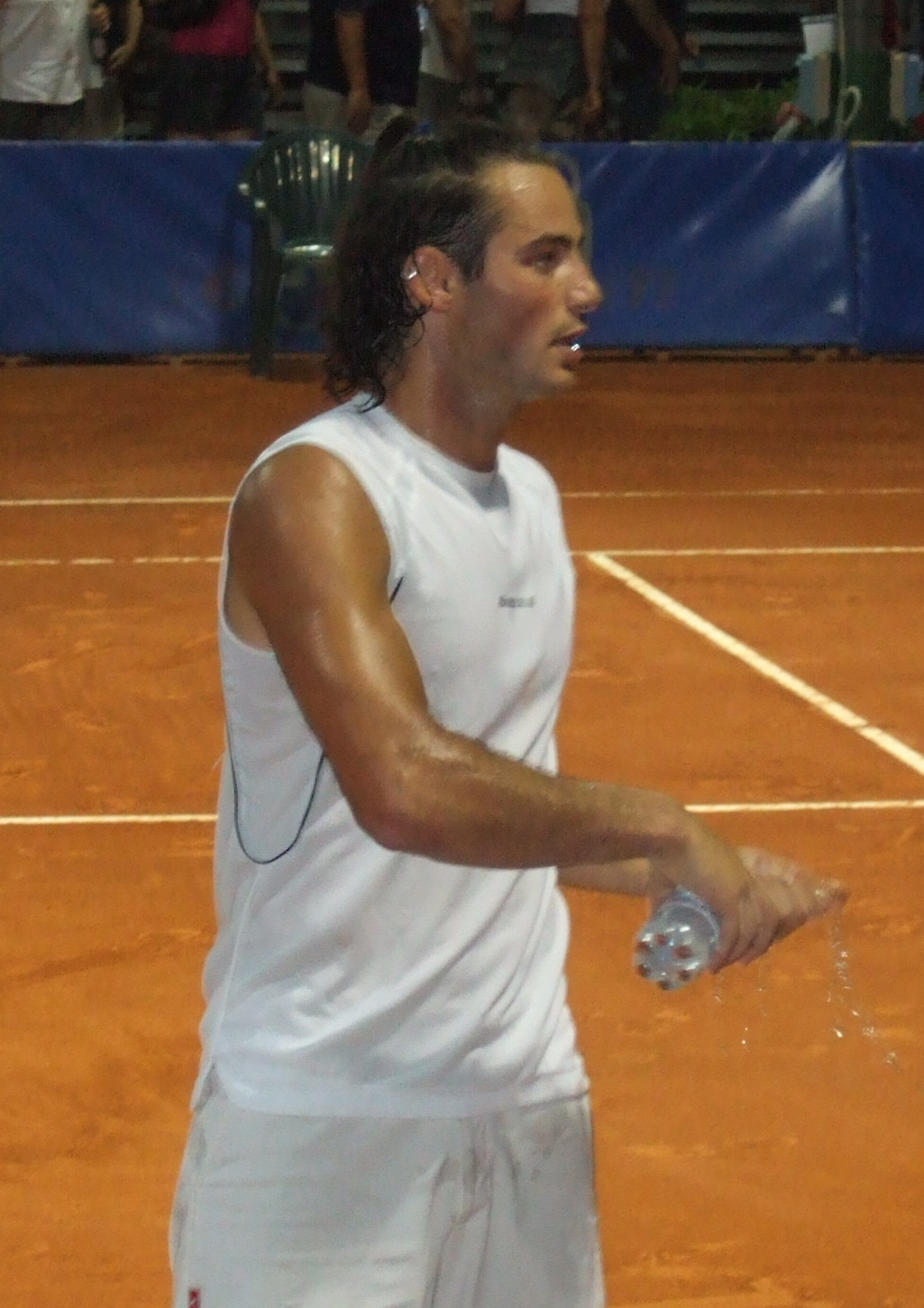
- Country (sports): Italy
- Residence: Arezzo, Italy
- Born: 3 January 1980 Arezzo, Italy
- Died: 25 October 2008 (aged 28) Arezzo, Italy
- Height: 1.87 m (6 ft 2 in)
- Turned pro: 1999
- Retired: 2008 (death)
- Plays: Right-handed (one-handed backhand)
- Prize money: $544,562

Singles
- Career record: 18–31
- Career titles: 0
- Highest ranking: No. 92 (11 February 2002)

Grand Slam singles results
- Australian Open: 2R (2006)
- French Open: 1R (2001, 2002)
- Wimbledon: Q3 (2005, 2007)
- US Open: Q2 (2004, 2006, 2007)

Doubles
- Career record: 1–6
- Career titles: 0
- Highest ranking: No. 258 (3 November 2003)

Grand Slam doubles results
- Wimbledon: Q1 (1999)

Federico Luzzi (Italian pronunciation: [fedeˈriːko ˈluttsi]; 3 January 1980 – 25 October 2008) was an Italian professional tennis player who had been ranked as high as World No. 92. Luzzi had been suspended from professional tennis in 2008 for six months after a determination was made that he had gambled on the outcome of matches over a three-year span. He was diagnosed with leukemia on a Wednesday and died four days later. While he was on suspension and awaiting the outcome of the case he studied acting in Hollywood. He screen tested and was to return to Hollywood in 2009 to begin filming two movies.

The FedeLux charity was founded in his honor, searching for a cure for cancer.

== Tennis career ==
The 1.87m (6 ft 2in) Luzzi, coached by Umberto Rianna, turned pro in 1999. His best season was in 2001 when he finished with the year ranked 96, having reached the quarterfinals at the Ciutat de Barcelona Tennis Tournament, won two ATP Challenger Series titles and made his Davis Cup debut.

In February 2002, Luzzi attained a world ranking of 92, the highest in his career. A serious shoulder injury plagued him for the remainder of his career.

Officials at the 2007 U.S. Open would not allow Luzzi to play while wearing a shirt with a Playboy bunny, as the logo failed a United States Tennis Association policy that only allows logos for recognized clothing manufacturers. Luzzi had worn the shirt during an opening qualifying match, but the USTA imposed the restriction before his second match, which Luzzi lost to Gabriel Trujillo-Soler of Spain.

In February 2008, the Association of Tennis Professionals found him guilty of wagering on the outcome of matches from May 2004 to April 2007. The ATP's Anti-Corruption Program prohibits all gambling on any form of tennis. The ATP banned Luzzi from playing for 200 days and fined him $50,000. The ATP determined that he had "wagered 273 times on 836 tennis matches", including a wager he had placed on himself to win a match, but the ATP stated that it had not uncovered any evidence that he had attempted to influence the result of any tennis match.

== Illness and death ==
Luzzi was forced to retire from a club match in Sardinia in mid-October due to a fever. He went to the hospital and on Wednesday 21 October was diagnosed with cancer. Luzzi had contracted a rapid form of pulmonic leukemia, and died four days later on 25 October 2008 in a hospital in his home town of Arezzo at age 28. His funeral was held in his hometown of Arezzo and was attended by over 3500 people including all of the officials of the Federazione Italiana Tennis (FIT) along with previous and current tennis stars of Italy. His pall bearers were his best friends.

== Singles titles ==
Legend (singles)
Grand Slam (0)
ATP Masters Series (0)
ATP Tour (0)
Challengers (3)

No.	Date	Tournament	Surface	Opponent	Score
1.	12 February 2001	Mumbai	Hard	(Italy) Stefano Galvani	6–7^{(2–7)}, 7–5, 7–6^{(7–4)}
2.	27 August 2001	Brindisi	Clay	(Greece) Vasilis Mazarakis	0–6, 7–6^{(7–3)}, 6–4
3.	26 February 2007	Cherbourg	Indoor Hard	(France) Jérôme Haehnel	7–5, 7–6^{(8–6)}
