= Branislav Sekáč =

Slovak tennis player

- Full name: Branislav Sekáč
- Country (sports): Slovakia
- Born: 3 September 1979 (age 47) Bratislava, Czechoslovakia
- Prize money: $47,549

Singles
- Highest ranking: No. 247 (10 February 2003)

Doubles
- Highest ranking: No. 174 (5 July 2004)

Branislav Sekáč (born 3 September 1979) is a former professional tennis player from Slovakia.

== Biography ==
Sekáč was born in Bratislava and attended the local University of Physical Education and Sports before turning professional.

His professional appearances were restricted to the Futures and Challenger circuits. In 2002 he won three Futures singles titles to halve his ranking from outside the top 600 at the start of the year to end the year at 271.

He made the second round of qualifying at the 2003 Australian Open and won three Challenger doubles titles.

As a coach he has been a staff member at the NTC in Bratislava and has acted as the personal coach of Kristína Schmiedlová.

== Challenger titles ==
=== Doubles: (3) ===
No.	Year	Tournament	Surface	Partner	Opponents	Score
1.	2001	Oberstaufen, Germany	Clay	(Slovakia) Karol Beck	(Austria) Thomas Strengberger (Austria) Clemens Trimmel	2–6, 6–1, 6–0
2.	2003	Belgaum, India	Hard	(Slovakia) Michal Mertiňák	(India) Mustafa Ghouse (India) Vishal Uppal	7–6^{3}, 7–6^{2}
3.	2004	Belgrade, Serbia	Carpet	(Ukraine) Orest Tereshchuk	(Serbia and Montenegro) Darko Mađarovski (Serbia and Montenegro) Janko Tipsarević	6–3, 6–4

== See also ==
- List of Slovakia Davis Cup team representatives
