= Jan Weinzierl =

German tennis player

- Full name: Jan Weinzierl
- Country (sports): Germany
- Born: 1 May 1973 (age 51); Biberach an der Riss, West Germany
- Plays: Right -handed
- Prize money: $118,107

Singles
- Career record: 0–2
- Career titles: 0
- Highest ranking: No. 228 (8 May 1995)

Doubles
- Highest ranking: No. 230 (14 October 2002)

Jan Weinzierl (born 1 May 1973) is a former professional tennis player from Germany.

== Biography ==
Weinzierl, a right-handed player, grew up in Biberach an der Riss. A winner of 11 Futures titles, he has beaten Nikolay Davydenko in Futures tournaments on three occasions and also has a win over Jo Wilfried Tsonga. He played his first Challenger tournament in 1994 and finished runner-up at Challengers twice in his career, at Campos Do Jordao and Sopot. His two ATP Tour main draw appearance came eight years apart. In 1995 he lost in the final round of qualifying at the Seoul Open but entered the draw as a lucky loser, where he was beaten in the first round by Paul Wekesa. He featured as a lucky loser again when he played at the 2003 International Raiffeisen Grand Prix in Sankt Pölten and lost in the first round to Irakli Labadze in three sets.
