= Ladislav Švarc =

Slovak tennis player

- Country (sports): Slovakia
- Born: 13 November 1978 (age 47) Bratislava, Czechoslovakia
- Height: 1.88 m (6 ft 2 in)
- Turned pro: 1997
- Plays: Right-handed
- Prize money: $135,227

Singles
- Career record: 0–4
- Career titles: 0
- Highest ranking: No. 218 (24 June 2002)

Grand Slam singles results
- Australian Open: 1R (2001)

Ladislav Švarc (born 13 November 1978) is a former professional tennis player from Slovakia.

Švarc competed in the main singles draw of the 2001 Australian Open, as a qualifier. He lost a four set match to Rainer Schüttler in the opening round.

In 2000, Švarc made his Davis Cup debut for Slovakia, when he played with fifth and deciding rubber of their World Group fixture against Austria, which he lost to Markus Hipfl. His only other Davis Cup appearance came in 2002 when he lost to American James Blake, after winning the first set.

== Challenger titles ==
=== Singles: (1) ===
| No. | Year | Tournament | Surface | Opponent | Score |
|---|---|---|---|---|---|
| 1. | 2004 | Saransk, Russia | Clay | (Belgium) Stefan Wauters | 6–2, 6–7^{(4–7)}, 6–0 |
