= Jean-Baptiste Perlant =

French tennis player

- Country (sports): France
- Born: 22 February 1977 (age 48); Bordeaux, France
- Height: 1.90 m (6 ft 3 in)
- Turned pro: 1996
- Plays: Right-handed
- Prize money: $145,439

Singles
- Career record: 2–4
- Career titles: 0
- Highest ranking: No. 136 (16 November 1998)

Grand Slam singles results
- French Open: 1R (1998)
- US Open: 2R (1998)

Doubles
- Career record: 0–2
- Career titles: 0
- Highest ranking: No. 384 (23 July 2007)

Grand Slam doubles results
- French Open: 1R (1997)

Jean-Baptiste Perlant (born 22 February 1977) is a former professional tennis player from France.

Perlant made his Grand Slam debut in the 1998 French Open. He lost his opening match to Spaniard Jose Imaz-Ruiz in five sets. At the US Open later that year, he defeated world number 38 Jason Stoltenberg, who had previously reached the semi-finals of Wimbledon. In the second round he met seventh seed Alex Corretja and again lost a five set match.

His only doubles appearance at Grand Slam level was in the 1997 French Open, where he partnered Jean-François Bachelot. The pair had the misfortune of having to face the number one seeds in the opening round, Todd Woodbridge and Mark Woodforde. They won just three games in the match.

== Challenger titles ==
=== Doubles: (1) ===
No.	Year	Tournament	Surface	Partner	Opponents	Score
1.	2007	Saint-Brieuc, France	Clay	(France) Xavier Pujo	(France) Jean-Christophe Faurel (France) Jérôme Haehnel	2–6, 6–2, [10–7]
