= 2006 Shelbourne Irish Open =

- Date: 3 – 9 July
- Edition: 1st
- Category: ATP Challenger Series
- Draw: 32S/16Q/16D
- Prize money: EUR €42,500
- Surface: Carpet / outdoor
- Location: Dublin, Ireland
- Venue: Fitzwilliam Lawn Tennis Club

Champions

Singles
- (Germany) Mischa Zverev

Doubles
- (Netherlands) Jasper Smit / (Netherlands) Martijn van Haasteren
Shelbourne Irish Open	· 2007 →

The 2006 Shelbourne Irish Open was a men's tennis tournament played on outdoor carpet courts. It was the 1st edition of the event, and part of the 2006 ATP Challenger Series of the 2006 ATP Tour. It took place at the tennis courts at the Fitzwilliam Lawn Tennis Club in Dublin, Ireland, from 3 through 9 July 2006.

== Points and prize money ==
=== Point distribution ===
Event	W	F	SF	QF	Round of 16	Round of 32	Q	Q3	Q2	Q1
Singles	50	35	22	12	5	1	—			
Doubles	50	35	22	12	1	—				

=== Prize money ===
Event	W	F	SF	QF	Round of 16	Round of 32	Q3	Q2	Q1
Singles	€6,150	€3,600	€2,130	€1,245	€730	€440	—		
Doubles *	€2,650	€1,500	€920	€540	€310	—			

_{* per team}

== Singles main draw entrants ==
=== Seeds ===
Country	Player	Rank	Seed
SCG	Janko Tipsarević	101	1
GER	Michael Berrer	116	2
DEN	Kristian Pless	139	3
ITA	Uros Vico	193	4
GRE	Konstantinos Economidis	200	5
GBR	Arvind Parmar	201	6
SWE	Jacob Adaktusson	230	7
AUS	Chris Guccione	258	8

=== Other entrants ===
The following players received wildcards into the singles main draw:

- (Republic of Ireland) Peter Clarke
- (Republic of Ireland) Conor Niland
- (Republic of Ireland) Stephen Nugent
- (Republic of Ireland) Kevin Sorensen

The following players received entry from the qualifying draw:

- (France) Jean-François Bachelot
- (United Kingdom) Lee Childs
- (United Kingdom) Jonathan Marray
- (Ukraine) Orest Tereshchuk

== Doubles main draw entrants ==
=== Seeds ===
Country	Player	Country	Player	Rank	Seed
FRA	Jean-François Bachelot	FRA	Nicolas Tourte	370	1
NED	Jasper Smit	NED	Martijn van Haasteren	390	2
GBR	Colin Fleming	GBR	Jamie Murray	426	3
SWE	Jacob Adaktusson	GBR	Jonathan Marray	543	4

=== Other entrants ===
The following pairs received wildcards into the doubles main draw:

- (Republic of Ireland) Peter Clarke / (Republic of Ireland) Stephen Nugent
- (Republic of Ireland) James Cluskey / (Republic of Ireland) James McGee
- (Republic of Ireland) Conor Niland / (Republic of Ireland) Kevin Sorensen

== Champions ==
=== Singles ===
- (Germany) Mischa Zverev defeated (Denmark) Kristian Pless, 7–5, 7–6^{(8–6)}

=== Doubles ===
- (Netherlands) Jasper Smit / (Netherlands) Martijn van Haasteren defeated (United Kingdom) Colin Fleming / (United Kingdom) Jamie Murray, 6–3, 2–6, [10–8]
