= 2007 Shelbourne Irish Open =

- Date: 2 – 7 July
- Edition: 2nd
- Category: ATP Challenger Series
- Draw: 32S/16Q/16D
- Prize money: EUR €42,500
- Surface: Carpet / outdoor
- Location: Dublin, Ireland
- Venue: Fitzwilliam Lawn Tennis Club

Champions

Singles
- (India) Rohan Bopanna

Doubles
- (India) Rohan Bopanna / (Australia) Adam Feeney
← 2006 ·	Shelbourne Irish Open	· 2008 →

The 2007 Shelbourne Irish Open was a men's tennis tournament played on outdoor carpet courts. It was the 2nd edition of the event, and part of the 2007 ATP Challenger Series of the 2007 ATP Tour. It took place at the tennis courts at the Fitzwilliam Lawn Tennis Club in Dublin, Ireland, from 2 through 7 July 2007.

== Points and prize money ==
=== Point distribution ===
Event	W	F	SF	QF	Round of 16	Round of 32	Q	Q3	Q2	Q1
Singles	55	38	24	13	5	0	—			
Doubles	55	38	24	13	0	—				

=== Prize money ===
Event	W	F	SF	QF	Round of 16	Round of 32	Q3	Q2	Q1
Singles	€6,150	€3,600	€2,130	€1,245	€730	€440	—		
Doubles *	€2,650	€1,500	€920	€540	€310	—			

_{* per team}

== Singles main draw entrants ==
=== Seeds ===
Country	Player	Rank	Seed
DEN	Kristian Pless	80	1
GER	Mischa Zverev	134	2
AUS	Nathan Healey	174	3
AUS	Alun Jones	198	4
GER	Simon Stadler	205	5
FRA	Nicolas Tourte	233	6
GBR	Jamie Baker	238	7
FRA	Gary Lugassy	248	8

=== Other entrants ===
The following players received wildcards into the singles main draw:

- (Republic of Ireland) Peter Clarke
- (Republic of Ireland) James Cluskey
- (Republic of Ireland) John McGahon
- (Republic of Ireland) James McGee

The following players received entry from the qualifying draw:

- (Australia) Colin Ebelthite
- (Latvia) Deniss Pavlovs
- (Denmark) Martin Pedersen
- (United Kingdom) Ken Skupski

The following players received entry as lucky losers into the singles main draw:

- (Canada) Pierre-Ludovic Duclos

== Doubles main draw entrants ==
=== Seeds ===
Country	Player	Country	Player	Rank	Seed
GER	Lars Burgsmüller	GER	Mischa Zverev	229	1
IND	Rohan Bopanna	AUS	Adam Feeney	291	2
CAN	Pierre-Ludovic Duclos	NED	Igor Sijsling	556	3
AUS	Alun Jones	AUS	Joseph Sirianni	634	4

=== Other entrants ===
The following pairs received wildcards into the doubles main draw:

- (Republic of Ireland) Peter Clarke / (Republic of Ireland) James McGee
- (Republic of Ireland) James Cluskey / (United Kingdom) Ken Skupski
- (Republic of Ireland) Fiacra Lennon / (Republic of Ireland) John McGahon

== Champions ==
=== Singles ===
- (India) Rohan Bopanna defeated (Denmark) Martin Pedersen, 6–4, 6–3

=== Doubles ===
- (India) Rohan Bopanna / (Australia) Adam Feeney defeated (Germany) Lars Burgsmüller / (Germany) Mischa Zverev, 6–2, 6–2
