= 2007 Shelbourne Irish Open – Doubles =

Doubles
- 2007 Shelbourne Irish Open

Final
- Champions: (India) Rohan Bopanna (Australia) Adam Feeney
- Runners-up: (Germany) Lars Burgsmüller (Germany) Mischa Zverev
- Score: 6–2, 6–2

Events
Singles	Doubles
← 2006 ·	Shelbourne Irish Open	· 2008 →

Jasper Smit and Martijn van Haasteren were the defending champions but chose not to compete this year.

Rohan Bopanna and Adam Feeney won the title, defeating German pair Lars Burgsmüller and Mischa Zverev in the final, 6–2, 6–2.

== Seeds ==
1. (Germany) Lars Burgsmüller / (Germany) Mischa Zverev (final)
2. (India) Rohan Bopanna / (Australia) Adam Feeney (champions)
3. (Canada) Colin Fleming / (Netherlands) Jamie Murray (first round)
4. (Australia) Alun Jones / (Australia) Joseph Sirianni (semifinals)

== Draw ==
=== Key ===
- Q = Qualifier
- WC = Wild card
- LL = Lucky loser
- Alt = Alternate
- SE = Special exempt
- PR = Protected ranking
- ITF = ITF entry
- JE = Junior exempt
- w/o = Walkover
- r = Retired
- d = Defaulted
- SR = Special ranking

=== Draw ===
First round
1	(Germany) L Burgsmüller (Germany) M Zverev	7^{7}	6
WC	(Republic of Ireland) J Cluskey (United Kingdom) K Skupski	6^{4}	3
WC	(Republic of Ireland) F Lennnon (Republic of Ireland) J McGahon	1	6^{3}
(Australia) C Ebelthite (Australia) D Fernandez	6	7^{7}
4	(Australia) A Jones (Australia) J Sirianni	7^{7}	6
WC	(Switzerland) S Bohli (Germany) S Stadler	6^{4}	3
(United Kingdom) A Slabinsky (Norway) F Sletting-Johnsen	4	3
(Republic of Ireland) C O'Brien (Republic of Ireland) L Sorensen	6	6
(Latvia) A Juška (Latvia) D Pavlovs	7^{7}	6
(Italy) R Ghedin (Sweden) B Rehnquist	6^{3}	4
(Chinese Taipei) T Chen (France) N Tourte	6	6
3	(Canada) P-L Duclos (Netherlands) I Sijsling	1	4
(Denmark) F Nielsen (Denmark) M Pedersen	6	6
WC	(Republic of Ireland) P Clarke (Republic of Ireland) J McGee	3	4
(United Kingdom) J Baker (United States) B Evans	5	4
2	(India) R Bopanna (Australia) A Feeney	7	6

Quarterfinals
1	(Germany) L Burgsmüller (Germany) M Zverev	6	6
(Australia) C Ebelthite (Australia) D Fernandez	4	2
4	(Australia) A Jones (Australia) J Sirianni	6	6
(Republic of Ireland) C O'Brien (Republic of Ireland) L Sorensen	3	4
(Latvia) A Juška (Latvia) D Pavlovs	6	7^{7}
(Chinese Taipei) T Chen (France) N Tourte	3	6^{4}
(Denmark) F Nielsen (Denmark) M Pedersen	6	6^{5}	[15]
2	(India) R Bopanna (Australia) A Feeney	3	7^{7}	[17]

Semifinals
1	(Germany) L Burgsmüller (Germany) M Zverev	7^{7}	7^{7}
4	(Australia) A Jones (Australia) J Sirianni	6^{5}	6^{5}
(Latvia) A Juška (Latvia) D Pavlovs	2	4
2	(India) R Bopanna (Australia) A Feeney	6	6

Final
1	(Germany) L Burgsmüller (Germany) M Zverev	2	2
2	(India) R Bopanna (Australia) A Feeney	6	6
