= 2006 ATP Challenger Series =

Tennis tour

Details
- Duration: 2 January 2006 – 3 December 2006
- Edition: 29th
- Tournaments: 160

Achievements (singles)

The ATP Challenger Series is the second tier tour for professional tennis organised by the Association of Tennis Professionals (ATP). The 2006 ATP Challenger Series calendar comprised 161 tournaments, with prize money ranging from $25,000 up to $125,000.

== Schedule ==
=== January ===
Date	Country	Tournament	Prizemoney	Surface	Singles champion	Doubles champions
02.01.	Brazil	São Paulo Challenger	$ 100,000	Hard	(Brazil) Flávio Saretta	(Brazil) Thiago Alves (Brazil) Flávio Saretta
02.01.	New Caledonia	Nouméa Challenger	$ 75,000	Hard	(France) Gilles Simon	(United States) Alex Bogomolov Jr. (United States) Todd Widom
23.01.	Germany	Heilbronn Open	$ 100,000	Carpet (i)	(Sweden) Robin Söderling	(Germany) Christopher Kas (Germany) Philipp Petzschner
23.01.	United States	Hilton Waikoloa Village USTA Challenger	$ 50,000	Hard	(Canada) Frank Dancevic	(Germany) Michael Kohlmann (Philippines) Cecil Mamiit
23.01.	Chile	Santiago de Chile Challenger	$ 25,000	Clay	(Serbia) Boris Pašanski	(Argentina) Máximo González (Argentina) Sergio Roitman
23.01.	Great Britain	Wrexham Challenger	$ 25,000	Hard (i)	(United Kingdom) Alex Bogdanovic	(France) Jean-François Bachelot (France) Stéphane Robert
30.01.	France	Andrezieux Challenger	$ 100,000	Hard (i)	(Belgium) Gilles Elseneer	(France) Julien Benneteau (France) Nicolas Mahut
30.01.	Brazil	Florianópolis Challenger	$ 25,000	Clay	(Brazil) Ricardo Mello	(Argentina) Máximo González (Argentina) Sergio Roitman

=== February ===
Date	Country	Tournament	Prizemoney	Surface	Singles champion	Doubles champions
06.02.	Poland	Breslau Challenger	$ 125,000	Hard (i)	(Czech Republic) Lukáš Dlouhý	(Poland) Mariusz Fyrstenberg (Poland) Marcin Matkowski
06.02.	Italy	Bergamo Challenger I	$ 50,000	Carpet (i)	(United Kingdom) Alex Bogdanovic	(Italy) Daniele Bracciali (Italy) Giorgio Galimberti
06.02.	United States	Challenger of Dallas	$ 50,000	Hard (i)	(United States) Kevin Kim	(United States) Rajeev Ram (United States) Bobby Reynolds
06.02.	Australia	Burnie Challenger	$ 25,000	Hard	(Greece) Konstantinos Economidis	(Australia) Luke Bourgeois (Chinese Taipei) Lu Yen-hsun
13.02.	Serbia	Belgrad Challenger	$ 100,000	Carpet (i)	(Serbia and Montenegro) Janko Tipsarević	(Germany) Michael Kohlmann (Germany) Alexander Waske
13.02.	United States	Joplin Challenger	$ 50,000	Hard (i)	(United States) Jesse Witten	(Ghana) Henry Adjei-Darko (United States) Lesley Joseph
20.02.	France	Besançon Challenger	$ 100,000	Hard (i)	(France) Nicolas Mahut	(Germany) Christopher Kas (Germany) Philipp Petzschner
27.02.	France	Cherbourg Challenger	$ 50,000	Hard (i)	(France) Nicolas Mahut	(France) Jean-François Bachelot (France) Stéphane Robert
27.02.	Germany	Volkswagen Challenger	$ 25,000	Carpet (i)	(Germany) Alexander Waske	(Switzerland) Jean-Claude Scherrer (Italy) Uros Vico

=== March ===
Date	Country	Tournament	Prizemoney	Surface	Singles champion	Doubles champions
06.03.	Japan	Kyōto Challenger	$ 25,000	Carpet (i)	(France) Nicolas Mahut	(Australia) Alun Jones (United Kingdom) Jonathan Marray
13.03.	United States	Sunrise Challenger	$ 100,000	Hard	(Russia) Dmitry Tursunov	(Czech Republic) Petr Pála (Czech Republic) Robin Vik
13.03.	Vietnam	HTV Challenger Romano Cup	$ 50,000	Hard	(United States) Zack Fleishman	(Chinese Taipei) Lee Hyung-taik (Philippines) Cecil Mamiit
13.03.	Ecuador	Salinas Challenger	$ 25,000	Hard	(Germany) Benjamin Becker	(Brazil) Thiago Alves (Brazil) Júlio Silva
13.03.	Bosnia and Herzegovina	Sarajevo Challenger	$ 25,000	Hard (i)	(Germany) Andreas Beck	(Serbia and Montenegro) Ilija Bozoljac (Serbia and Montenegro) Viktor Troicki
20.03.	Italy	Barletta Challenger	$ 25,000	Clay	(Czech Republic) Jan Hájek	(Spain) Santiago Ventura (Spain) Fernando Vicente
27.03.	Mexico	Mexiko-Stadt Challenger	$ 125,000	Clay	(Paraguay) Ramón Delgado	(United States) Tripp Phillips (Netherlands) Rogier Wassen
27.03.	Italy	Naples Challenger	$ 100,000	Clay	(Italy) Potito Starace	(Czech Republic) Tomáš Cibulec (Poland) Łukasz Kubot
27.03.	France	St. Brieuc Challenger	$ 25,000	Clay (i)	(France) Marc Gicquel	(United States) Eric Butorac (United States) Chris Drake

=== April ===
Date	Country	Tournament	Prizemoney	Surface	Singles champion	Doubles champions
03.04.	United States	Tallahassee Challenger	$ 50,000	Hard	(United States) Mardy Fish	(South Africa) Rik de Voest (United States) Glenn Weiner
03.04.	Mexico	Aguascalientes Challenger	$ 25,000	Clay	(Argentina) Juan Martín del Potro	(Argentina) Juan Martín del Potro (Argentina) Martín Vassallo Argüello
03.04.	Italy	Monza Challenger	$ 25,000	Clay	(France) Nicolas Devilder	(Spain) Rubén Ramírez Hidalgo (Italy) Tomas Tenconi
10.04.	Brazil	Florianopolis Challenger	$ 100,000	Clay	(Argentina) Diego Junqueira	(Argentina) Cristian Villagrán (Argentina) Juan Pablo Brzezicki
10.04.	Mexico	San Luis Potosí Challenger	$ 50,000	Clay	(Austria) Rainer Eitzinger	(Mexico) Daniel Garza (Poland) Dawid Olejniczak
10.04.	United States	Valencia Challenger	$ 50,000	Hard	(Canada) Frédéric Niemeyer	(United States) John Paul Fruttero (United States) Sam Warburg
17.04.	Bermuda	Bermuda Challenger	$ 100,000	Clay	(Spain) Fernando Vicente	(Czech Republic) Tomáš Cibulec (Sweden) Robert Lindstedt
17.04.	Great Britain	Cardiff Challenger	$ 25,000	Hard (i)	(Czech Republic) Jan Vacek	(Germany) Philipp Petzschner (Austria) Alexander Peya
17.04.	Switzerland	Chiasso Challenger	$ 25,000	Clay	(Austria) Werner Eschauer	(Italy) Leonardo Azzaro (Croatia) Lovro Zovko
17.04.	India	Chikmagalur Challenger	$ 25,000	Hard	(Thailand) Danai Udomchoke	(Thailand) Sanchai Ratiwatana (Thailand) Sonchat Ratiwatana
17.04.	Mexico	León Challenger I	$ 25,000	Hard	(United States) Phillip Simmonds	(Mexico) Juan Manuel Elizondo (Mexico) Miguel Gallardo Valles
24.04.	Colombia	Bogotá Challenger	$ 100,000	Clay	(Colombia) Alejandro Falla	(United States) Eric Butorac (United States) Chris Drake
24.04.	Italy	Bergamo Challenger II	$ 25,000	Clay	(France) Nicolas Devilder	(Czech Republic) Jan Hájek (Czech Republic) Jaroslav Pospíšil
24.04.	India	PVG Open	$ 25,000	Hard	(Serbia and Montenegro) Viktor Troicki	(Slovakia) Kamil Čapkovič (Slovakia) Lukáš Lacko
24.04.	Spain	Lanzarote Challenger	$ 25,000	Hard	(Sweden) Filip Prpic	(France) Grégory Carraz (France) Jean-Michel Pequery
24.04.	Mexico	León Challenger II	$ 25,000	Hard	(South Africa) Rik de Voest	(Canada) Pierre-Ludovic Duclos (Brazil) André Ghem

=== May ===
Date	Country	Tournament	Prizemoney	Surface	Singles champion	Doubles champions
01.05.	Tunisia	Tunis Challenger	$ 125,000	Clay	(Algeria) Lamine Ouahab	(Spain) Daniel Gimeno Traver (Spain) Iván Navarro
01.05.	United States	Atlanta Challenger	$ 25,000	Clay	(Argentina) Diego Hartfield	(United States) Hugo Armando (Brazil) André Sá
01.05.	Czech Republic	Ostrava Challenger	$ 25,000	Clay	(Czech Republic) Ivo Minář	(Czech Republic) Jaroslav Pospíšil (Czech Republic) Pavel Šnobel
01.05.	Italy	Rome Challenger	$ 25,000	Clay	(Austria) Oliver Marach	(Greece) Konstantinos Economidis (Israel) Amir Hadad
01.05.	Spain	Telde Challenger	$ 25,000	Clay	(Spain) Marc López	(Poland) Adam Chadaj (Sweden) Michael Ryderstedt
08.05.	Czech Republic	Prague Challenger	$ 100,000	Clay	(Czech Republic) Robin Vik	(Czech Republic) Petr Pála (Czech Republic) David Škoch
08.05.	United States	Tunica Resorts Challenger	$ 50,000	Clay (i)	(Argentina) Diego Hartfield	(United States) Jeff Morrison (United States) Bobby Reynolds
08.05.	Germany	Ostdeutscher Sparkassen Cup	$ 25,000	Clay	(Germany) Simon Greul	(Switzerland) Yves Allegro (Slovakia) Michal Mertiňák
15.05.	United States	Forest Hills Challenger	$ 50,000	Clay	(United States) Robert Kendrick	(United States) Chris Drake (Philippines) Cecil Mamiit
15.05.	Croatia	Zagreb Challenger	$ 50,000	Clay	(Germany) Daniel Elsner	(Switzerland) Yves Allegro (Slovakia) Michal Mertiňák
15.05.	Uzbekistan	Fergana Challenger	$ 25,000	Hard	(Thailand) Danai Udomchoke	(Thailand) Sanchai Ratiwatana (Thailand) Sonchat Ratiwatana
15.05.	Italy	Sanremo Challenger	$ 25,000	Clay	(France) Olivier Patience	(France) Julien Benneteau (France) Nicolas Mahut
29.05.	South Korea	Busan Challenger	$ 50,000	Hard	(South Korea) Lee Hyung-taik	(United States) Scott Lipsky (United States) Todd Widom
29.05.	Germany	Ettlingen Challenger	$ 25,000	Clay	(Germany) Simon Greul	(Greece) Vasilis Mazarakis (Chile) Felipe Parada
29.05.	Italy	Turin Challenger	$ 25,000	Clay	(Italy) Flavio Cipolla	(Spain) Marcel Granollers (Spain) Marc López

=== June ===
Date	Country	Tournament	Prizemoney	Surface	Singles champion	Doubles champions
05.06.	Czech Republic	Prostějov Challenger	$ 125,000	Clay	(Czech Republic) Jan Hájek	(Czech Republic) František Čermák (Czech Republic) Jaroslav Levinský
05.06.	Germany	Schickedanz Open	$ 50,000	Clay	(Germany) Florian Mayer	(Greece) Vasilis Mazarakis (Chile) Felipe Parada
05.06.	Great Britain	Surbiton Challenger	$ 50,000	Grass	(United States) Mardy Fish	(Australia) Jordan Kerr (United States) Jim Thomas
05.06.	United States	Yuba City Challenger	$ 50,000	Hard	(United States) Sam Querrey	(United States) Scott Lipsky (United States) David Martin
05.06.	Italy	Sassuolo Challenger	$ 25,000	Clay	(Portugal) Frederico Gil	(Italy) Francesco Aldi (Italy) Tomas Tenconi
12.06.	Switzerland	Lugano Challenger	$ 100,000	Clay	(France) Olivier Patience	(Italy) Giorgio Galimberti (Austria) Oliver Marach
12.06.	Slovakia	Košice Challenger	$ 25,000	Clay	(France) Nicolas Devilder	(Slovakia) Viktor Bruthans (Czech Republic) Pavel Šnobel
19.06.	Germany	Nord/LB Open	$ 125,000	Clay	(Czech Republic) Jan Hájek	(Germany) Tomas Behrend (Germany) Christopher Kas
19.06.	Italy	MILAN Challenger	$ 25,000	Clay	(United States) Wayne Odesnik	(Italy) Giorgio Galimberti (Israel) Harel Levy
26.06.	Romania	Constanța Challenger	$ 25,000	Clay	(Greece) Konstantinos Economidis	(Greece) Konstantinos Economidis (Netherlands Antilles) Jean-Julien Rojer
26.06.	Italy	Reggio Emilia Challenger	$ 25,000	Clay	(France) Olivier Patience	(Italy) Fabio Colangelo (Italy) Giancarlo Petrazzuolo

=== July ===
Date	Country	Tournament	Prizemoney	Surface	Singles champion	Doubles champions
03.07.	Spain	Córdoba Challenger	$ 125,000	Hard	(Germany) Simon Greul	(United States) Justin Gimelstob (United States) Kevin Kim
03.07.	Italy	Biella Challenger	$ 100,000	Clay	(Italy) Simone Bolelli	(Argentina) Lucas Arnold Ker (Argentina) Agustín Calleri
03.07.	Ireland	Dublin Challenger	$ 50,000	Carpet	(Germany) Mischa Zverev	(Netherlands) Jasper Smit (Netherlands) Martijn van Haasteren
03.07.	United States	Winnetka Challenger	$ 50,000	Hard	(United States) Sam Querrey	(Philippines) Cecil Mamiit (Philippines) Eric Taino
03.07.	France	Montauban Challenger	$ 25,000	Clay	(Algeria) Lamine Ouahab	(Uruguay) Pablo Cuevas (Chile) Adrián García
10.07.	Poland	Posen Challenger	$ 100,000	Clay	(Czech Republic) Jan Hájek	(Poland) Tomasz Bednarek (Poland) Michał Przysiężny
10.07.	Netherlands	Scheveningen Challenger	$ 75,000	Clay	(Spain) Guillermo García López	(Spain) Guillermo García López (Spain) Salvador Navarro
10.07.	Ecuador	Cuenca Challenger	$ 25,000	Clay	(Colombia) Carlos Salamanca	(Germany) Frank Moser (Germany) Alexander Satschko
10.07.	Italy	Mantua Challenger	$ 25,000	Clay	(Argentina) Cristian Villagrán	(Spain) Pablo Andújar (Spain) Marcel Granollers
10.07.	Germany	Oberstaufen Cup	$ 25,000	Clay	(Czech Republic) Michal Tabara	(Latvia) Ernests Gulbis (Germany) Mischa Zverev
17.07.	Colombia	Bogotá Challenger II	$ 125,000	Clay	(Colombia) Santiago Giraldo	(Mexico) Daniel Garza (Colombia) Michael Quintero
17.07.	Turkey	Istanbul Challenger	$ 125,000	Hard	(Austria) Alexander Peya	(Kazakhstan) Alexey Kedryuk (Ukraine) Orest Tereshchuk
17.07.	United States	Aptos Challenger	$ 75,000	Hard	(United States) Alex Kuznetsov	(India) Prakash Amritraj (India) Rohan Bopanna
17.07.	Russia	Penza Challenger	$ 50,000	Hard	(Uzbekistan) Farrukh Dustov	(Uzbekistan) Murad Inoyatov (Uzbekistan) Denis Istomin
17.07.	Italy	Rimini Challenger	$ 50,000	Clay	(Spain) Pablo Andújar	(Argentina) Juan Pablo Brzezicki (Argentina) Cristian Villagrán
17.07.	Great Britain	Manchester Challenger	$ 25,000	Grass	(India) Harsh Mankad	(United Kingdom) Josh Goodall (United Kingdom) Ross Hutchins
24.07.	Brazil	Campos do Jordão Challenger	$ 50,000	Hard	(Brazil) Ricardo Mello	(Brazil) Marcelo Melo (Brazil) André Sá
24.07.	Canada	Granby Challenger	$ 50,000	Hard	(Canada) Frank Dancevic	(Canada) Alessandro Gravina (France) Gary Lugassy
24.07.	United States	Lexington Challenger	$ 50,000	Hard	(South Korea) Lee Hyung-taik	(Thailand) Sanchai Ratiwatana (Thailand) Sonchat Ratiwatana
24.07.	Finland	Tampere Challenger	$ 50,000	Clay	(Germany) Florian Mayer	(France) Thierry Ascione (France) Édouard Roger-Vasselin
24.07.	Great Britain	Nottingham Challenger I	$ 25,000	Grass	(France) Antony Dupuis	(United Kingdom) Martin Lee (United Kingdom) Jonathan Marray
24.07.	Italy	Recanati Challenger	$ 25,000	Hard	(Italy) Davide Sanguinetti	(Italy) Simone Bolelli (Italy) Davide Sanguinetti
24.07.	Russia	Togliatti Cup	$ 25,000	Hard	(Italy) Uros Vico	(Austria) Alexander Peya (Italy) Uros Vico
31.07.	Spain	Segovia Challenger	$ 100,000	Hard	(Argentina) Juan Martín del Potro	(Australia) Paul Baccanello (Australia) Chris Guccione
31.07.	Canada	Vancouver Challenger	$ 100,000	Hard	(South Africa) Rik de Voest	(United States) Eric Butorac (United States) Travis Parrott
31.07.	Italy	Trani Challenger	$ 50,000	Clay	(Argentina) Juan Pablo Guzmán	(Italy) Leonardo Azzaro (Italy) Daniele Giorgini
31.07.	Brazil	Belo Horizonte Challenger	$ 25,000	Hard	(Brazil) Thiago Alves	(Brazil) Marcelo Melo (Brazil) André Sá
31.07.	Russia	Saransk Challenger	$ 25,000	Clay	(Netherlands) Igor Sijsling	(Kazakhstan) Alexey Kedryuk (Ukraine) Orest Tereshchuk
31.07.	Romania	Timișoara Challenger	$ 25,000	Clay	(France) Nicolas Devilder	(Romania) Victor Crivoi (Romania) Victor Ioniță

=== August ===
Date	Country	Tournament	Prizemoney	Surface	Singles champion	Doubles champions
07.08.	San Marino	San Marino Challenger	$ 100,000	Clay	(Spain) Albert Montañés	(Argentina) Máximo González (Argentina) Sergio Roitman
07.08.	United States	DBI Tennis Challenger	$ 50,000	Hard	(United States) Scott Oudsema	(United States) Scott Lipsky (United States) David Martin
07.08.	Brazil	Joinville Challenger	$ 50,000	Clay	(Brazil) André Ghem	(Brazil) André Ghem (Brazil) Alexandre Simoni
07.08.	Spain	Vigo Challenger	$ 37.500	Clay	(Spain) Pablo Andújar	(Spain) Pablo Andújar (Spain) Marcel Granollers
07.08.	Russia	St. Petersburg Challenger	$ 25,000	Clay	(France) David Guez	(Uzbekistan) Murad Inoyatov (Uzbekistan) Denis Istomin
14.08.	United States	Bronx Challenger	$ 50,000	Hard	(United States) Michael Russell	(United Kingdom) Martin Lee (Israel) Harel Levy
14.08.	France	Cordenons Challenger	$ 50,000	Clay	(Greece) Konstantinos Economidis	(Italy) Francesco Aldi (Croatia) Lovro Zovko
14.08.	Austria	Graz Challenger	$ 25,000	Hard	(Germany) Florian Mayer	(United Kingdom) Ross Hutchins (United Kingdom) Jonathan Marray
14.08.	Ecuador	Manta Challenger	$ 25,000	Hard	(Brazil) Thiago Alves	(United States) Eric Nunez (Netherlands Antilles) Jean-Julien Rojer
14.08.	Uzbekistan	Samarkand Challenger	$ 25,000	Clay	(Serbia and Montenegro) Janko Tipsarević	(Japan) Satoshi Iwabuchi (Japan) Gouichi Motomura
21.08.	Italy	Manerbio Challenger	$ 50,000	Clay	(Sweden) Andreas Vinciguerra	(Romania) Gabriel Moraru (Romania) Adrian Ungur
21.08.	Switzerland	Genf Challenger	$ 37.500	Clay	(France) Jérôme Haehnel	(Czech Republic) Michal Navrátil (Russia) Yuri Schukin
21.08.	Uzbekistan	Bukhara Challenger	$ 25,000	Hard	(Serbia and Montenegro) Janko Tipsarević	(France) Nicolas Renavand (France) Nicolas Tourte
28.08.	Italy	Como Challenger	$ 25,000	Clay	(Italy) Simone Bolelli	(United Kingdom) Jamie Delgado (United Kingdom) Jamie Murray
28.08.	Germany	Black Forest Open	$ 25,000	Clay	(United States) Hugo Armando	(Germany) Tomas Behrend (Germany) Dominik Meffert
28.08.	Slovenia	Kranj Challenger	$ 25,000	Clay	(Austria) Werner Eschauer	(Spain) Antonio Baldellou-Esteva (Spain) Héctor Ruiz-Cadenas

=== September ===
Date	Country	Tournament	Prizemoney	Surface	Singles champion	Doubles champions
04.09.	Romania	Brașov Challenger	$ 25,000	Clay	(Spain) Marc López	(North Macedonia) Lazar Magdinčev (North Macedonia) Predrag Rusevski
04.09.	Ukraine	Donetsk Challenger	$ 25,000	Clay	(Serbia and Montenegro) Ilija Bozoljac	(Ukraine) Aleksandr Nedovyesov (Ukraine) Aleksandr Yarmola
04.09.	Germany	Düsseldorf Open Challenger	$ 25,000	Clay	(Russia) Evgeny Korolev	(United States) Hugo Armando (Germany) Tomas Behrend
04.09.	Italy	Genua Challenger	$ 25,000	Clay	(Spain) Gorka Fraile	(Italy) Adriano Biasella (Argentina) Marcelo Charpentier
11.09.	France	Orléans Challenger	$ 75,000	Hard (i)	(Belgium) Olivier Rochus	(France) Grégory Carraz (Belgium) Dick Norman
11.09.	United States	New Orleans Challenger	$ 50,000	Hard	(Philippines) Cecil Mamiit	(Philippines) Cecil Mamiit (United States) Sam Warburg
11.09.	Spain	Sevilla Challenger	$ 50,000	Clay	(Spain) Iván Navarro	(Spain) Pablo Andújar (Spain) Marcel Granollers
11.09.	Brazil	Belém Challenger	$ 25,000	Clay	(Argentina) Guillermo Cañas	(Argentina) Brian Dabul (Argentina) Cristian Villagrán
18.09.	Poland	Szczecin Challenger	$ 125,000	Clay	(Ecuador) Nicolás Lapentti	(Germany) Tomas Behrend (Germany) Christopher Kas
18.09.	United States	Lubbock Challenger	$ 50,000	Hard	(United States) Sam Querrey	(United States) Chris Drake (United States) Scott Lipsky
18.09.	Spain	Tarragona Challenger	$ 50,000	Clay	(Italy) Paolo Lorenzi	(United States) Hugo Armando (Spain) Gabriel Trujillo Soler
18.09.	Bosnia and Herzegovina	Banja Luka Challenger	$ 25,000	Clay	(Austria) Marco Mirnegg	(Australia) Joseph Sirianni (Belgium) Stefan Wauters
25.09.	France	Grenoble Challenger	$ 50,000	Hard (i)	(France) Michaël Llodra	(Russia) Teymuraz Gabashvili (Russia) Evgeny Korolev
25.09.	United States	Tulsa Challenger	$ 50,000	Hard	(United States) Bobby Reynolds	(United States) Bobby Reynolds (United States) Rajeev Ram
25.09.	Slovakia	Bratislava Challenger	$ 25,000	Clay	(Slovakia) Michal Mertiňák	(United States) Eric Butorac (United States) Travis Parrott
25.09.	Brazil	Gramado Challenger	$ 25,000	Hard	(Brazil) Franco Ferreiro	(Brazil) Franco Ferreiro (Uruguay) Martín Vilarrubí

=== October ===
Date	Country	Tournament	Prizemoney	Surface	Singles champion	Doubles champions
02.10.	Belgium	Mons Challenger	$ 125,000	Hard (i)	(Serbia) Janko Tipsarević	(Switzerland) Jean-Claude Scherrer (Croatia) Lovro Zovko
02.10.	Ecuador	Quito Challenger	$ 25,000	Clay	(Australia) Chris Guccione	(Brazil) Rogério Dutra Silva (Brazil) Marcelo Melo
09.10.	United States	Sacramento Challenger	$ 75,000	Hard	(United States) Paul Goldstein	(United States) Paul Goldstein (United States) Jeff Morrison
09.10.	France	Rennes Challenger	$ 50,000	Hard (i)	(France) Jo-Wilfried Tsonga	(France) Grégory Carraz (France) Mathieu Montcourt
09.10.	Spain	Barcelona Challenger	$ 25,000	Clay	(Spain) Marcel Granollers	(Germany) Tomas Behrend (Italy) Flavio Cipolla
09.10.	Colombia	Medellín Challenger	$ 25,000	Clay	(Australia) Chris Guccione	(Brazil) André Ghem (Brazil) Marcelo Melo
16.10.	Colombia	Bogotá Challenger III	$ 75,000	Clay	(Argentina) Diego Hartfield	(Brazil) Marcelo Melo (Brazil) André Sá
16.10.	United States	Calabasas Challenger	$ 50,000	Hard	(Australia) Mark Philippoussis	(United States) Robert Kendrick (Philippines) Cecil Mamiit
16.10.	Denmark	Kolding Challenger	$ 50,000	Hard (i)	(France) Michaël Llodra	(South Africa) Jeff Coetzee (Netherlands) Rogier Wassen
23.10.	Uruguay	Montevideo Challenger	$ 75,000	Clay	(Argentina) Guillermo Cañas	(Argentina) Máximo González (Argentina) Sergio Roitman
23.10.	Great Britain	Nottingham Challenger II	$ 25,000	Hard (i)	(Germany) Alexander Waske	(Sweden) Filip Prpic (France) Nicolas Tourte
30.10.	South Korea	Seoul Challenger	$ 100,000	Hard	(South Korea) Lee Hyung-taik	(Austria) Alexander Peya (Germany) Björn Phau
30.10.	Brazil	Aracaju Challenger	$ 75,000	Clay	(Argentina) Sergio Roitman	(Argentina) Máximo González (Argentina) Sergio Roitman
30.10.	Germany	Lambertz Open by STAWAG	$ 50,000	Carpet (i)	(Germany) Rainer Schüttler	(Germany) Mischa Zverev (Latvia) Ernests Gulbis
30.10.	United States	Louisville Challenger	$ 50,000	Hard (i)	(United States) Amer Delić	(Netherlands) Robin Haase (Netherlands) Igor Sijsling
30.10.	Canada	Rimouski Challenger	$ 25,000	Hard (i)	(Denmark) Kristian Pless	(Denmark) Frederik Nielsen (Denmark) Kristian Pless

=== November ===
Date	Country	Tournament	Prizemoney	Surface	Singles champion	Doubles champions
06.11.	Slovakia	Bratislava Challenger	$ 100,000	Hard (i)	(Slovakia) Michal Mertiňák	(United States) Eric Butorac (United States) Travis Parrott
06.11.	Argentina	Buenos Aires Challenger	$ 75,000	Clay	(Argentina) Guillermo Cañas	(Brazil) André Ghem (Brazil) Flávio Saretta
06.11.	South Korea	Busan Challenger	$ 75,000	Hard	(South Korea) Lee Hyung-taik	(United States) Scott Lipsky (United States) Todd Widom
06.11.	United States	Nashville Challenger	$ 75,000	Hard (i)	(Netherlands) Robin Haase	(United States) Scott Lipsky (United States) David Martin
06.11.	Germany	Bauer Watertechnology Cup	$ 25,000	Carpet (i)	(Latvia) Ernests Gulbis	(United Kingdom) Josh Goodall (United Kingdom) Ross Hutchins
13.11.	Ukraine	Dnipropetrovs'k Challenger	$ 125,000	Hard (i)	(Russia) Dmitry Tursunov	(Ukraine) Sergiy Stakhovsky (Ukraine) Orest Tereshchuk
13.11.	Paraguay	Asunción Challenger	$ 75,000	Clay	(Argentina) Guillermo Cañas	(Germany) Tomas Behrend (Brazil) André Ghem
13.11.	France	Champaign Challenger	$ 50,000	Hard (i)	(United States) Amer Delić	(United States) Rajeev Ram (South Africa) Rik de Voest
13.11.	Ecuador	Guayaquil Challenger	$ 50,000	Clay	(Argentina) Sergio Roitman	(Argentina) Juan Pablo Brzezicki (Argentina) Leonardo Mayer
13.11.	Finland	Helsinki Challenger	$ 50,000	Hard (i)	(Germany) Michael Berrer	(Netherlands) Jasper Smit (Netherlands) Martijn van Haasteren
13.11.	Australia	Caloundra Challenger	$ 25,000	Hard	(Chinese Taipei) Lu Yen-hsun	(Australia) Nathan Healey (Australia) Robert Smeets
20.11.	Italy	Naples Challenger	$ 50,000	Clay	(Italy) Potito Starace	(Czech Republic) Tomáš Cibulec (Poland) Łukasz Kubot
20.11.	Australia	Kawana Challenger	$ 25,000	Hard (i)	(France) Julien Jeanpierre	(Australia) Nathan Healey (Australia) Robert Smeets
20.11.	Mexico	Puebla Challenger	$ 25,000	Hard	(United States) Robert Kendrick	(Mexico) Daniel Garza (Netherlands Antilles) Jean-Julien Rojer
20.11.	Great Britain	LTA Shrewsbury Challenger	$ 25,000	Hard (i)	(United Kingdom) Alex Bogdanovic	(Germany) Philipp Marx (Denmark) Frederik Nielsen
27.11.	United States	Maui Challenger	$ 50,000	Hard	(United States) Michael Russell	(United States) Rajeev Ram (United States) Brian Wilsson
