= 2006 Shelbourne Irish Open – Doubles =

Doubles
- 2006 Shelbourne Irish Open

Final
- Champions: (Netherlands) Jasper Smit (Netherlands) Martijn van Haasteren
- Runners-up: (United Kingdom) Colin Fleming (United Kingdom) Jamie Murray
- Score: 6–2, 2–6, [10–8]

Events
Singles	Doubles
Shelbourne Irish Open	· 2007 →

This was the first edition of the tournament.

Dutch pair Jasper Smit and Martijn van Haasteren won the title, defeating British pair Colin Fleming and Jamie Murray in the final, 6–2, 2–6, [10–8].

== Seeds ==
1. (France) Jean-François Bachelot / (France) Nicolas Tourte (semifinals)
2. (Netherlands) Jasper Smit / (Netherlands) Martijn van Haasteren (champions)
3. (United Kingdom) Colin Fleming / (United Kingdom) Jamie Murray (final)
4. (Sweden) Jacob Adaktusson / (United Kingdom) Jonathan Marray (semifinals)

== Draw ==
=== Key ===
- Q = Qualifier
- WC = Wild card
- LL = Lucky loser
- Alt = Alternate
- SE = Special exempt
- PR = Protected ranking
- ITF = ITF entry
- JE = Junior exempt
- w/o = Walkover
- r = Retired
- d = Defaulted
- SR = Special ranking

=== Draw ===
First round
1	(France) J-F Bachelot (France) N Tourte	7^{7}	3	[10]
(United States) T Hahn (United States) K Thomas	6^{2}	6	[5]
WC	(Republic of Ireland) J Cluskey (Republic of Ireland) J McGee	3	4
(Poland) A Chadaj (South Korea) O-h Kwon	6	6
3	(United Kingdom) C Fleming (United Kingdom) J Murray	6	6
WC	(Republic of Ireland) C Niland (Republic of Ireland) K Sorensen	2	1
(Denmark) F Nielsen (Denmark) R Norby	6	6
(Italy) M Pedrini (Ukraine) O Tereshchuk	3	2
(France) X Audouy (France) G Lugassy	4	7^{9}	[7]
(United States) J Cerretani (United States) B Wilson	6	6^{7}	[10]
(United Kingdom) L Childs (United Kingdom) A Parmar	3	7^{8}	[10]
4	(Sweden) J Adaktusson (United Kingdom) J Marray	6	6^{6}	[12]
WC	(Republic of Ireland) P Clarke (Republic of Ireland) S Nugent	4	2
(Latvia) E Gulbis (Latvia) A Juška	6	6
(Greece) K Economidis (Italy) U Vico	4	7^{9}	[6]
2	(Netherlands) J Smit (Netherlands) M van Haasteren	6	6^{7}	[10]

Quarterfinals
1	(France) J-F Bachelot (France) N Tourte	6	6
(Poland) A Chadaj (South Korea) O-h Kwon	4	2
3	(United Kingdom) C Fleming (United Kingdom) J Murray	7	6
(Denmark) F Nielsen (Denmark) R Norby	5	3
(United States) J Cerretani (United States) B Wilson
4	(Sweden) J Adaktusson (United Kingdom) J Marray	w/o
(Latvia) E Gulbis (Latvia) A Juška	6^{2}	7	[6]
2	(Netherlands) J Smit (Netherlands) M van Haasteren	7^{7}	5	[10]

Semifinals
1	(France) J-F Bachelot (France) N Tourte	2	6	[8]
3	(United Kingdom) C Fleming (United Kingdom) J Murray	6	4	[10]
4	(Sweden) J Adaktusson (United Kingdom) J Marray	2	5
2	(Netherlands) J Smit (Netherlands) M van Haasteren	6	7

Final
3	(United Kingdom) C Fleming (United Kingdom) J Murray	3	6	[8]
2	(Netherlands) J Smit (Netherlands) M van Haasteren	6	2	[10]
