= 2007 Shelbourne Irish Open – Singles =

Singles
- 2007 Shelbourne Irish Open

Final
- Champion: (India) Rohan Bopanna
- Runner-up: (Denmark) Martin Pedersen
- Score: 6–4, 6–3

Events
| Singles | Doubles |
| ← 2006 · | Shelbourne Irish Open | · 2008 → |

Mischa Zverev was the defending champion but lost in the quarterfinals to Rohan Bopanna.

Bopanna went on to win the tournament, defeating Danish qualifier Martin Pedersen in the final, 6–4, 6–3.

== Seeds ==
1. (Denmark) Kristian Pless (withdrew)
2. (Germany) Mischa Zverev (quarterfinals)
3. (Australia) Nathan Healey (first round)
4. (Australia) Alun Jones (quarterfinals)
5. (Germany) Simon Stadler (first round)
6. (France) Nicolas Tourte (first round)
7. (United Kingdom) Jamie Baker (first round)
8. (France) Gary Lugassy (first round)

== Draw ==
=== Key ===
- Q = Qualifier
- WC = Wild card
- LL = Lucky loser
- Alt = Alternate
- SE = Special exempt
- PR = Protected ranking
- ITF = ITF entry
- JE = Junior exempt
- w/o = Walkover
- r = Retired
- d = Defaulted
- SR = Special ranking

=== Finals ===
Semifinals
Q | (Denmark) Martin Pedersen | 7^{7} | 7^{7}
Q | (Australia) Colin Ebelthite | 6^{4} | 6^{2}
(Republic of Ireland) Conor Niland | 4 | 4
(India) Rohan Bopanna | 6 | 6

Final
Q | (Denmark) Martin Pedersen | 4 | 3
(India) Rohan Bopanna | 6 | 6

=== Top half ===
First round
LL | (Canada) P-L Duclos | 6 | 6
(Slovakia) I Zelenay | 3 | 4
Q | (Denmark) M Pedersen | 6 | 7^{7}
(Denmark) F Nielsen | 4 | 6^{5}
(United States) B Evans | 6 | 6
WC | (Republic of Ireland) J McGahon | 3 | 2
(Republic of Ireland) L Sorensen | 6 | 7^{7}
6 | (France) N Tourte | 3 | 6^{1}
4 | (Australia) A Jones | 7 | 6
WC | (Republic of Ireland) J McGee | 5 | 4
(Australia) A Feeney | 6 | 3 | 7^{7}
Q | (United Kingdom) K Skupski | 3 | 6 | 6^{3}
WC | (Republic of Ireland) P Clarke | 6 | 7^{8}
(Netherlands) I Sijsling | 3 | 6^{6}
Q | (Australia) C Ebelthite | 4 | 6 | 6
7 | (United Kingdom) J Baker | 6 | 2 | 4

Second round
LL | (Canada) P-L Duclos | 5 | 6 | 1
Q | (Denmark) M Pedersen | 7 | 4 | 6
(United States) B Evans | 3 | 2
(Republic of Ireland) L Sorensen | 6 | 6
4 | (Australia) A Jones | 3 | 6 | 6
(Australia) A Feeney | 6 | 3 | 3
WC | (Republic of Ireland) P Clarke | 4 | 4
Q | (Australia) C Ebelthite | 6 | 6

Quarterfinals
Q | (Denmark) M Pedersen | 6 | 7
(Republic of Ireland) L Sorensen | 4 | 5
4 | (Australia) A Jones | 6^{5} | 4
Q | (Australia) C Ebelthite | 7^{7} | 6

Semifinals
Q | (Denmark) M Pedersen | 7^{7} | 7^{7}
Q | (Australia) C Ebelthite | 6^{4} | 6^{2}

=== Bottom half ===
First round
8 | (France) G Lugassy | 6 | 3 | 4
(Republic of Ireland) C Niland | 3 | 6 | 6
(Slovenia) G Žemlja | 7 | 7^{7}
(Italy) R Ghedin | 5 | 6^{2}
(Australia) J Sirianni | 4 | 2
Q | (Latvia) D Pavlovs | 6 | 6
(Sweden) B Rehnquist | 6 | 7^{8}
3 | (Australia) N Healey | 2 | 6^{6}
5 | (Germany) S Stadler | 6^{2} | 1
(India) R Bopanna | 7^{7} | 6
(Chinese Taipei) T Chen | 7^{7} | 6
WC | (Republic of Ireland) J Cluskey | 6^{2} | 4
(Switzerland) S Bohli | 6^{4} | 7^{8} | 2
(Germany) L Burgsmüller | 7^{7} | 6^{6} | 6
(Latvia) A Juška | 6^{2} | 6^{2}
2 | (Germany) M Zverev | 7^{7} | 7^{7}

Second round
(Republic of Ireland) C Niland | 4 | 6 | 7^{7}
(Slovenia) G Žemlja | 6 | 4 | 6^{4}
Q | (Latvia) D Pavlovs | 4 | 6 | 2
(Sweden) B Rehnquist | 6 | 3 | 6
(India) R Bopanna | 7^{12} | 6
(Chinese Taipei) T Chen | 6^{10} | 1
(Germany) L Burgsmüller | 4 | 3
2 | (Germany) M Zverev | 6 | 6

Quarterfinals
(Republic of Ireland) C Niland | 6 | 6
(Sweden) B Rehnquist | 4 | 3
(India) R Bopanna | 6^{3} | 6 | 6
2 | (Germany) M Zverev | 7^{7} | 4 | 3

Semifinals
(Republic of Ireland) C Niland | 4 | 4
(India) R Bopanna | 6 | 6
