= 2006 Shelbourne Irish Open – Singles =

Singles
- 2006 Shelbourne Irish Open

Final
- Champion: (Germany) Mischa Zverev
- Runner-up: (Denmark) Kristian Pless
- Score: 7–5, 7–6^{(8–6)}

Events
Singles	Doubles
Shelbourne Irish Open	· 2007 →

This was the first edition of the tournament.

Unseeded German Mischa Zverev won the title, defeating Kristian Pless in the final, 7–5, 7–6^{(8–6)}.

== Seeds ==
1. (Serbia and Montenegro) Janko Tipsarević (second round)
2. (Germany) Michael Berrer (first round)
3. (Denmark) Kristian Pless (final)
4. (Italy) Uros Vico (semifinals)
5. (Greece) Konstantinos Economidis (first round)
6. (United Kingdom) Arvind Parmar (first round)
7. (Sweden) Jacob Adaktusson (quarterfinals)
8. (Australia) Chris Guccione (first round)

== Draw ==
=== Key ===
- Q = Qualifier
- WC = Wild card
- LL = Lucky loser
- Alt = Alternate
- SE = Special exempt
- PR = Protected ranking
- ITF = ITF entry
- JE = Junior exempt
- w/o = Walkover
- r = Retired
- d = Defaulted
- SR = Special ranking

=== Finals ===
Semifinals
(Germany) Mischa Zverev	4	6	6
4	(Italy) Uros Vico	6	0	3
3	(Denmark) Kristian Pless	6	6
(United Kingdom) Richard Bloomfield	4	4

Final
(Germany) Mischa Zverev	7	7^{8}
2	(Denmark) Kristian Pless	5	6^{6}

=== Top half ===
First round
1	(Serbia and Montenegro) J Tipsarević	6	6
(France) N Renavand	4	4
(Germany) M Zverev	3	6	7^{9}
(France) G Lugassy	6	3	6^{7}
WC	(Republic of Ireland) S Nugent	4	2
(Poland) A Chadaj	6	6
(France) N Tourte	1	6	6
6	(United Kingdom) A Parmar	6	1	4
4	(Italy) U Vico	6	6
(United States) B Wilson	2	2
(Australia) P Baccanello	6^{6}	6	6
Q	(France) J-F Bachelot	7^{8}	3	4
Q	(Ukraine) O Tereshchuk	6	6
(Australia) L Bourgeois	3	2
(United Kingdom) M Smith	6^{4}	4
7	(Sweden) J Adaktusson	7^{7}	6

Second round
1	(Serbia and Montenegro) J Tipsarević	6^{5}	2
(Germany) M Zverev	7^{7}	6
(Poland) A Chadaj	6	3	6
(France) N Tourte	3	6	1
4	(Italy) U Vico	7^{7}	6^{2}	6
(Australia) P Baccanello	6^{4}	7^{7}	4
Q	(Ukraine) O Tereshchuk	4	1
7	(Sweden) J Adaktusson	6	6

Quarterfinals
(Germany) M Zverev	6	6
(Poland) A Chadaj	2	2
4	(Italy) U Vico	6	6
7	(Sweden) J Adaktusson	4	3

Semifinals
(Germany) M Zverev	4	6	6
4	(Italy) U Vico	6	0	3

=== Bottom half ===
First round
8	(Australia) C Guccione	6	6
(South Korea) O-h Kwon	3	4
(United Kingdom) A Mackin	7^{7}	6
WC	(Republic of Ireland) C Niland	6^{4}	1
(Italy) M Pedrini	3	4
(Latvia) E Gulbis	6	6
WC	(Republic of Ireland) K Sorensen	4	7	3
3	(Denmark) K Pless	6	5	6
5	(Greece) K Economidis	4	7^{8}	6^{8}
Q	(United Kingdom) L Childs	6	6^{6}	7^{10}
(Denmark) F Nielsen	6	1	6
Q	(United Kingdom) J Marray	4	6	4
(Czech Republic) J Masik	4	6^{3}
WC	(Republic of Ireland) P Clarke	6	7^{7}
(United Kingdom) R Bloomfield	6	7^{8}
2	(Germany) M Berrer	3	6^{6}

Second round
8	(Australia) C Guccione	6^{7}	5
(United Kingdom) A Mackin	7^{9}	7
(Latvia) E Gulbis	6^{3}	4
3	(Denmark) K Pless	7^{7}	6
Q	(United Kingdom) L Childs	2	2
(Denmark) F Nielsen	6	6
WC	(Republic of Ireland) P Clarke	6^{4}	3
(United Kingdom) R Bloomfield	7^{7}	6

Quarterfinals
(United Kingdom) A Mackin	4	4
3	(Denmark) K Pless	6	6
(Denmark) F Nielsen	6^{1}	6	5
(United Kingdom) R Bloomfield	7^{7}	2	7

Semifinals
3	(Denmark) K Pless	6	7
(United Kingdom) R Bloomfield	4	5
