= 2007 ATP Challenger Series =

Tennis tour

Details
- Duration: 1 January 2007 – 9 December 2007
- Edition: 30th
- Tournaments: 171

Achievements (singles)

The ATP Challenger Series is the second tier tour for professional tennis organised by the Association of Tennis Professionals (ATP). The 2007 ATP Challenger Series calendar comprised 174 tournaments, with prize money ranging from $25,000 up to $150,000.

== Schedule ==
=== January ===
Date	Country	Tournament	Prizemoney	Surface	Singles champion	Doubles champions
01.01.	Brazil	São Paulo Challenger	$ 100,000	Hard	(Argentina) Guillermo Cañas	(Uruguay) Pablo Cuevas (Chile) Adrián García
01.01.	France	Nouméa Challenger	$ 75,000	Hard	(United States) Michael Russell	(United States) Alex Kuznetsov (United States) Phillip Simmonds
15.01.	Chile	La Serena Challenger	$ 50,000	Clay	(Argentina) Mariano Zabaleta	(Spain) Marc López (Italy) Simone Vagnozzi
22.01.	South Africa	Durban Challenger	$ 125,000	Hard	(France) Mathieu Montcourt	(South Africa) Rik de Voest (Germany) Dominik Meffert
22.01.	Germany	Heilbronn Open	$ 100,000	Hard (i)	(Germany) Michael Berrer	(Germany) Michael Kohlmann (Germany) Rainer Schüttler
22.01.	United States	Hilton Waikoloa Village USTA Challenger	$ 50,000	Hard	(United States) Michael Russell	(United States) Brendan Evans (United States) Scott Oudsema
22.01.	Chile	Santiago de Chile Challenger	$ 25,000	Clay	(Argentina) Martín Vassallo Argüello	(Argentina) Brian Dabul (Spain) Marc López
22.01.	United Kingdom	Wrexham Challenger	$ 25,000	Hard (i)	(Poland) Michał Przysiężny	(France) Thomas Oger (France) Nicolas Tourte

=== February ===
Date	Country	Tournament	Prizemoney	Surface	Singles champion	Doubles champions
05.02.	Poland	Wroclaw Challenger	$ 125,000	Hard (i)	(Austria) Werner Eschauer	(Czech Republic) Lukáš Rosol (Czech Republic) Jan Vacek
05.02.	Italy	Bergamo Challenger	$ 100,000	Carpet (i)	(France) Fabrice Santoro	(France) Jérôme Haehnel (Monaco) Jean-René Lisnard
05.02.	United States	Challenger of Dallas	$ 50,000	Hard (i)	(United States) Robert Kendrick	(United States) Eric Butorac (United Kingdom) Jamie Murray
05.02.	Brazil	Florianópolis Challenger I	$ 35,000	Clay	(Spain) Óscar Hernández	(Brazil) Márcio Carlsson (Brazil) Lucas Engel
05.02.	Australia	Burnie Challenger I	$ 25,000	Hard	(Australia) Nathan Healey	(Australia) Nathan Healey (Australia) Robert Smeets
12.02.	United States	Joplin Challenger	$ 50,000	Hard (i)	(United States) Michael Russell	(United States) Patrick Briaud (United States) Donald Young
19.02.	France	Besançon Challenger	$ 100,000	Hard (i)	(Latvia) Ernests Gulbis	(Germany) Christopher Kas (Austria) Alexander Peya
26.02.	France	Cherbourg Challenger	$ 50,000	Hard (i)	(Italy) Federico Luzzi	(Slovakia) Michal Mertiňák (Czech Republic) Robin Vik
26.02.	Germany	Volkswagen Challenger	$ 25,000	Carpet (i)	(Netherlands) Robin Haase	(Austria) Alexander Peya (Germany) Lars Uebel

=== March ===
Date	Country	Tournament	Prizemoney	Surface	Singles champion	Doubles champions
05.03.	Japan	Kyōto Challenger	$ 25,000	Carpet v(i)	(Japan) Takao Suzuki	(Thailand) Sanchai Ratiwatana (Thailand) Sonchat Ratiwatana
05.03.	Ecuador	Salinas Challenger	$ 25,000	Hard	(Argentina) Juan Pablo Brzezicki	(United States) Scott Lipsky (United States) David Martin
12.03.	Colombia	Bogotá Challenger I	$ 125,000	Clay	(Colombia) Santiago Giraldo	(Argentina) Martín García (Argentina) Diego Hartfield
12.03.	United States	Sunrise Challenger	$ 100,000	Hard	(France) Gaël Monfils	(Greece) Konstantinos Economidis (Belgium) Kristof Vliegen
12.03.	Vietnam	Samsung Challenger	$ 50,000	Hard	(Czech Republic) Pavel Šnobel	(China) Yu Xinyuan (China) Zeng Shaoxuan
12.03.	Bosnia and Herzegovina	Sarajevo Challenger	$ 25,000	Hard (i)	(Latvia) Ernests Gulbis	(Latvia) Ernests Gulbis (Latvia) Deniss Pavlovs
19.03.	Morocco	Rabat Challenger	$ 35,000	Clay	(Italy) Stefano Galvani	(Russia) Yuri Schukin (Ukraine) Orest Tereshchuk
19.03.	Italy	Barletta Challenger	$ 25,000	Clay	(Argentina) Carlos Berlocq	(Spain) David Marrero (Spain) Albert Portas
26.03.	Mexico	Mexiko-Stadt Challenger	$ 125,000	Clay	(Paraguay) Ramón Delgado	'Brazil Marcelo Melo; Argentina Horacio Zeballos
26.03.	Italy	Neapel Challenger	$ 100,000	Clay	(Italy) Potito Starace	(Italy) Flavio Cipolla (Spain) Marcel Granollers
26.03.	Morocco	Fès Challenger	$ 35,000	Clay	(Australia) Peter Luczak	(Ukraine) Sergiy Stakhovsky (Ukraine) Orest Tereshchuk
26.03.	France	Saint-Brieuc Challenger	$ 25,000	Clay(i)	(Denmark) Kristian Pless	(France) Jean-Baptiste Perlant (France) Xavier Pujo

=== April ===
Date	Country	Tournament	Prizemoney	Surface	Singles champion	Doubles champions
02.04.	Mexico	San Luis Potosí Challenger	$ 50,000	Clay	(Spain) Fernando Vicente	(France) Jérémy Chardy (Brazil) Marcelo Melo
02.04.	United States	Tallahassee Challenger	$ 50,000	Hard	(France) Jo-Wilfried Tsonga	(South Africa) Izak van der Merwe (South Africa) Wesley Whitehouse
02.04.	Italy	Monza Challenger	$ 25,000	Clay	(Austria) Werner Eschauer	(Australia) Nathan Healey (Australia) Jordan Kerr
09.04.	Morocco	Casablanca Challenger	$ 75,000	Clay	(Croatia) Marin Čilić	(Poland) Łukasz Kubot (Austria) Oliver Marach
09.04.	United States	Santa Clarita Challenger	$ 50,000	Hard	(United States) Alex Bogdanovic	(Israel) Harel Levy (United States) Sam Warburg
09.04.	Switzerland	Chiasso Challenger	$ 25,000	Clay	(Austria) Werner Eschauer	(Netherlands) Bart Beks (Netherlands) Matwé Middelkoop
09.04.	Mexico	Mexiko-Stadt Challenger	$ 25,000	Hard	(Paraguay) Ramón Delgado	(Brazil) Marcelo Melo (Argentina) Horacio Zeballos
16.04.	United Kingdom	Bermuda Challenger	$ 100,000	Clay	(Argentina) Mariano Zabaleta	(Brazil) Marcelo Melo (Brazil) André Sá
16.04.	Morocco	Marrakesch Challenger	$ 100,000	Clay	(Morocco) Younes El Aynaoui	(Czech Republic) Tomáš Cibulec (Australia) Jordan Kerr
16.04.	United Kingdom	Cardiff Challenger	$ 25,000	Hard (i)	(Canada) Frédéric Niemeyer	(Czech Republic) Pavel Šnobel (Czech Republic) Jan Vacek
23.04.	Brazil	Florianópolis Challenger II	$ 50,000	Clay	(Chile) Paul Capdeville	(Uruguay) Pablo Cuevas (Argentina) Horacio Zeballos
30.04.	Tunisia	Tunis Open	$ 125,000	Clay	(Italy) Simone Bolelli	(Poland) Łukasz Kubot (Austria) Oliver Marach
30.04.	Spain	Lanzarote Challenger	$ 50,000	Hard	(France) Jo-Wilfried Tsonga	(Australia) Luke Bourgeois (South Africa) Rik de Voest
30.04.	United States	Naples Challenger	$ 50,000	Clay	(United States) Bobby Reynolds	(Argentina) Juan Pablo Brzezicki (Argentina) Leonardo Mayer
30.04.	Czech Republic	Ostrava Challenger	$ 50,000	Clay	(Czech Republic) Bohdan Ulihrach	(Germany) Bastian Knittel (Czech Republic) Lukáš Rosol
30.04.	Italy	Rom Challenger	$ 25,000	Clay	(France) Thierry Ascione	(Italy) Flavio Cipolla (Spain) Marcel Granollers

=== May ===
Date	Country	Tournament	Prizemoney	Surface	Singles champion	Doubles champions
07.05.	Czech Republic	Prague Challenger	$ 100,000	Clay	(Czech Republic) Dušan Lojda	(Czech Republic) Tomáš Cibulec (Australia) Jordan Kerr
07.05.	Germany	Ostdeutscher Sparkassen Cup	$ 50,000	Clay	(Russia) Yuri Schukin	(Germany) Tomas Behrend (Germany) Christopher Kas
07.05.	United States	Tunica Resorts Challenger	$ 50,000	Clay (i)	(Uruguay) Pablo Cuevas	(United States) Paul Goldstein (United States) Donald Young
07.05.	Croatia	Rijeka Challenger	$ 35,000	Clay	(Croatia) Marin Čilić	(France) Jérôme Haehnel (Monaco) Jean-René Lisnard
07.05.	Spain	Maspalomas Challenger	$ 25,000	Clay	(Australia) Peter Luczak	(Spain) Marcel Granollers (Spain) Marc López
14.05.	United States	Forest Hills Challenger	$ 50,000	Clay	(United States) Paul Goldstein	(United States) Rajeev Ram (United States) Bobby Reynolds
14.05.	Croatia	Zagreb Challenger	$ 50,000	Clay	(Serbia) Janko Tipsarević	(Germany) Tomas Behrend (Brazil) André Ghem
14.05.	Italy	Sanremo Challenger	$ 25,000	Clay	(Italy) Francesco Aldi	(Thailand) Sanchai Ratiwatana (Thailand) Sonchat Ratiwatana
21.05.	Uzbekistan	Fergana Challenger	$ 35,000	Hard	(France) Antony Dupuis	(Germany) Daniel Brands (United States) John Paul Fruttero
28.05.	South Korea	Busan Challenger	$ 75,000	Hard	(Chinese Taipei) Jimmy Wang	(Ukraine) Sergei Bubka (United States) John Paul Fruttero
28.05.	United States	Carson Challenger	$ 50,000	Hard	(United States) Alex Bogomolov Jr.	(United States) Bobby Reynolds (United States) Rajeev Ram
28.05.	Germany	Karlsruhe Challenger	$ 25,000	Clay	(Germany) Mischa Zverev	(United States) Alex Kuznetsov (Germany) Mischa Zverev

=== June ===
Date	Country	Tournament	Prizemoney	Surface	Singles champion	Doubles champions
04.06.	Czech Republic	Prostějov Challenger	$ 150,000	Clay	(Argentina) Sergio Roitman	(Paraguay) Ramón Delgado (Argentina) Juan Pablo Guzmán
04.06.	Germany	Schickedanz Open	$ 50,000	Clay	(Australia) Peter Luczak	(Mexico) Bruno Echagaray (Brazil) André Ghem
04.06.	United Kingdom	Surbiton Challenger	$ 50,000	Grass	(France) Jo-Wilfried Tsonga	(United States) Alex Kuznetsov (Germany) Mischa Zverev
04.06.	United States	Yuba City Challenger	$ 50,000	Hard	(United States) Kevin Kim	(Israel) Harel Levy (United States) Sam Warburg
04.06.	Italy	Sassuolo Challenger	$ 25,000	Clay	(Ukraine) Alexandr Dolgopolov	(Italy) Giorgio Galimberti (Brazil) Márcio Torres
11.06.	Switzerland	Lugano Challenger	$ 100,000	Clay	(Austria) Werner Eschauer	(Thailand) Sanchai Ratiwatana (Thailand) Sonchat Ratiwatana
11.06.	Kazakhstan	Astana Challenger	$ 75,000	Hard	(Russia) Mikhail Ledovskikh	(Germany) Daniel Brands (Australia) Adam Feeney
11.06.	Poland	Bytom Challenger	$ 35,000	Clay	(Australia) Peter Luczak	(United States) Hugo Armando (Argentina) Brian Dabul
11.06.	Slovakia	Košice Challenger	$ 25,000	Clay	(France) Jérémy Chardy	(Slovakia) Filip Polášek (Czech Republic) Lukáš Rosol
18.06.	Germany	Nord/LB Open	$ 125,000	Clay	(Spain) Óscar Hernández	(Germany) Tomas Behrend (Germany) Christopher Kas
18.06.	Kazakhstan	Almaty Challenger I	$ 35,000	Clay	(Germany) Simon Greul	(Slovakia) Kamil Čapkovič (Bosnia and Herzegovina) Ivan Dodig
18.06.	Italy	Mailand Challenger	$ 25,000	Clay	(Spain) Santiago Ventura	(Italy) Fabio Colangelo (Uruguay) Martín Vilarrubí
25.06.	Kazakhstan	Almaty Challenger II	$ 35,000	Clay	(Germany) Simon Greul	(Romania) Teodor-Dacian Crăciun (Romania) Florin Mergea
25.06.	Italy	Reggio nell’Emilia Challenger	$ 35,000	Clay	(France) Olivier Patience	(Brazil) Franco Ferreiro (Algeria) Lamine Ouahab
25.06.	Roumania	Constanța Challenger	$ 25,000	Clay	(Argentina) Sebastián Decoud	(Spain) Marc Fornell Mestres (Spain) Gabriel Trujillo Soler

=== July ===
Date	Country	Tournament	Prizemoney	Surface	Singles champion	Doubles champions
02.07.	Spain	Córdoba Challenger	$ 125,000	Hard	(Spain) Adrián Menéndez	(Spain) Santiago Ventura (Spain) Fernando Vicente
02.07.	Italy	Turin Challenger	$ 100,000	Clay	(Argentina) Carlos Berlocq	(Uruguay) Pablo Cuevas (Argentina) Horacio Zeballos
02.07.	Ireland	Dublin Challenger	$ 50,000	Carpet	(India) Rohan Bopanna	(India) Rohan Bopanna (Australia) Adam Feeney
02.07.	United States	Winnetka Challenger	$ 50,000	Hard	(Israel) Noam Okun	(United States) Patrick Briaud (United States) Chris Drake
02.07.	France	Montauban Challenger	$ 25,000	Clay	(Switzerland) Michael Lammer	(Spain) Marc Fornell Mestres (Spain) Gabriel Trujillo Soler
09.07.	Netherlands	Scheveningen Challenger	$ 100,000	Clay	(Uruguay) Pablo Cuevas	(Netherlands) Raemon Sluiter (Netherlands) Peter Wessels
09.07.	Colombia	Bogotá Challenger II	$ 50,000	Clay	(Colombia) Carlos Salamanca	(Argentina) Brian Dabul (Mexico) Santiago González
09.07.	Italy	Mantua Challenger	$ 50,000	Clay	(Italy) Alessio di Mauro	(Russia) Andrey Golubev (Italy) Francesco Piccari
09.07.	Germany	Oberstaufen Cup	$ 25,000	Clay	(Spain) Gabriel Trujillo Soler	(Slovakia) Filip Polášek (Slovakia) Igor Zelenay
16.07.	United States	Aptos Challenger	$ 75,000	Hard	(United States) Donald Young	(United States) Rajeev Ram (United States) Bobby Reynolds
16.07.	Italy	Rimini Challenger	$ 50,000	Clay	(Austria) Oliver Marach	(Spain) Carles Poch Gradin (Spain) Santiago Ventura
16.07.	Spain	Cuenca Challenger	$ 25,000	Clay	(Argentina) Leonardo Mayer	(Brazil) Bruno Soares (Brazil) Márcio Torres
16.07.	United Kingdom	Manchester Challenger	$ 25,000	Grass	(Israel) Harel Levy	(India) Rohan Bopanna (Pakistan) Aisam-ul-Haq Qureshi
16.07.	Russia	Togliatti Cup	$ 25,000	Hard	(Israel) Dudi Sela	(Sweden) Johan Brunström (Kuwait) Mohammad Ghareeb
23.07.	Poland	Posen Challenger	$ 100,000	Clay	(Netherlands) Raemon Sluiter	(Spain) Marc López (Spain) Santiago Ventura
23.07.	Canada	Granby Challenger	$ 50,000	Hard	(Japan) Takao Suzuki	(Thailand) Sanchai Ratiwatana (Thailand) Sonchat Ratiwatana
23.07.	United States	Lexington Challenger	$ 50,000	Hard	(United States) John Isner	(United States) Brendan Evans (United States) Ryan Sweeting
23.07.	Russia	Pensa Challenger	$ 50,000	Hard	(Germany) Benedikt Dorsch	(Russia) Alexandre Krasnoroutskiy (Russia) Alexander Kudryavtsev
23.07.	United Kingdom	Nottingham Challenger	$ 25,000	Grass	(Australia) Alun Jones	(India) Rohan Bopanna (Pakistan) Aisam-ul-Haq Qureshi
23.07.	Italy	Recanati Challenger	$ 25,000	Hard	(Chinese Taipei) Jimmy Wang	(Italy) Fabio Colangelo (Ukraine) Sergiy Stakhovsky
30.07.	Spain	Segovia Challenger	$ 125,000	Hard	(Spain) Fernando Verdasco	(India) Rohan Bopanna (Pakistan) Aisam-ul-Haq Qureshi
30.07.	Canada	Vancouver Challenger	$ 100,000	Hard	(Canada) Frédéric Niemeyer	(South Africa) Rik de Voest (Australia) Ashley Fisher
30.07.	Finland	Tampere Challenger	$ 50,000	Clay	(France) Éric Prodon	(Sweden) Johan Brunström (Kuwait) Mohammad Ghareeb
30.07.	Italy	Trani Challenger	$ 50,000	Clay	(Italy) Flavio Cipolla	(Italy) Leonardo Azzaro (Italy) Daniele Giorgini
30.07.	Roumania	Timișoara Challenger	$ 35,000	Clay	(Romania) Victor Hănescu	(Spain) Marcel Granollers (Spain) Santiago Ventura
30.07.	Brazil	Belo Horizonte Challenger	$ 25,000	Hard	(Argentina) Brian Dabul	(Mexico) Santiago González (Brazil) Bruno Soares
30.07.	Russia	Saransk Challenger	$ 25,000	Clay	(Russia) Mikhail Kukushkin	(Netherlands) Antal van der Duim (Netherlands) Boy Westerhof

=== August ===
Date	Country	Tournament	Prizemoney	Surface	Singles champion	Doubles champions
06.08.	Turkey	Istanbul Challenger	$ 100,000	Hard	(Germany) Mischa Zverev	(United Kingdom) James Auckland (United Kingdom) Ross Hutchins
06.08.	San Marino	San Marino Challenger	$ 100,000	Clay	(Italy) Potito Starace	(Uruguay) Pablo Cuevas (Argentina) Juan Pablo Guzmán
06.08.	United States	Levene Gouldin & Thompson Tennis Challenger	$ 50,000	Hard	(Sweden) Thomas Johansson	(United States) Scott Oudsema (United States) Ryan Sweeting
06.08.	Brazil	Campos do Jordão Challenger	$ 50,000	Hard	(Argentina) Brian Dabul	(Argentina) Eduardo Schwank (Argentina) Horacio Zeballos
06.08.	Uzbekistan	Samarkand Challenger	$ 35,000	Clay	(Russia) Mikhail Kukushkin	(Ukraine) Sergei Bubka (Russia) Evgeny Kirillov
06.08.	Spain	Vigo Challenger	$ 35,000	Clay	(Argentina) Máximo González	(Italy) Leonardo Azzaro (Algeria) Lamine Ouahab
13.08.	United States	Bronx Challenger	$ 50,000	Hard	(United States) Sam Warburg	(India) Rohan Bopanna (Pakistan) Aisam-ul-Haq Qureshi
13.08.	France	Cordenons Challenger	$ 50,000	Clay	(Argentina) Máximo González	(Italy) Alessandro da Col (Italy) Andrea Stoppini
13.08.	Uzbekistan	Bukhara Challenger	$ 35,000	Hard	(Uzbekistan) Denis Istomin	(Russia) Evgeny Kirillov (Russia) Alexander Kudryavtsev
13.08.	Austria	Graz Challenger	$ 25,000	Clay	(Romania) Victor Hănescu	(Argentina) Sebastián Decoud (Russia) Yuri Schukin
13.08.	Ecuador	Manta Challenger	$ 25,000	Hard	(Japan) Go Soeda	(Argentina) Eduardo Schwank (Argentina) Horacio Zeballos
20.08.	Italy	Manerbio Challenger	$ 50,000	Clay	(Czech Republic) Jiří Vaněk	(Netherlands) Antal van der Duim (Netherlands) Boy Westerhof
20.08.	Switzerland	Genf Challenger	$ 35,000	Clay	(Russia) Yuri Schukin	(Argentina) Sebastián Decoud (Russia) Yuri Schukin
20.08.	Uzbekistan	Qarshi Challenger	$ 35,000	Hard	(Uzbekistan) Denis Istomin	(Australia) Andrew Coelho (Australia) Adam Feeney
27.08.	Ukraine	Tscherkassy Challenger	$ 50,000	Clay	(Serbia) Boris Pašanski	(Spain) Daniel Muñoz de la Nava (Spain) Santiago Ventura
27.08.	Italy	Como Challenger	$ 50,000	Clay	(Argentina) Máximo González	(Argentina) Máximo González (Italy) Simone Vagnozzi
27.08.	Germany	Black Forest Open	$ 25,000	Clay	(Czech Republic) Ivo Minář	(Spain) Marc López (Uruguay) Martín Vilarrubí

=== September ===
Date	Country	Tournament	Prizemoney	Surface	Singles champion	Doubles champions
03.09.	Netherlands	Alphen aan den Rijn Challenger	$ 50,000	Clay	(Netherlands) Jesse Huta Galung	(Italy) Leonardo Azzaro (Croatia) Lovro Zovko
03.09.	Ukraine	Donezk Challenger	$ 50,000	Hard	(Croatia) Roko Karanušić	(Germany) Philipp Petzschner (Germany) Simon Stadler
03.09.	Roumania	Brașov Challenger	$ 25,000	Clay	(Argentina) Máximo González	(Romania) Florin Mergea (Romania) Horia Tecău
03.09.	Germany	Düsseldorf Open Challenger	$ 25,000	Clay	(Germany) Denis Gremelmayr	(Italy) Fabio Colangelo (Germany) Philipp Marx
03.09.	Italy	Genua Challenger	$ 25,000	Clay	(Italy) Flavio Cipolla	(Italy) Daniele Giorgini (Italy) Simone Vagnozzi
10.09.	France	Orléans Challenger	$ 100,000	Hard (i)	(Belgium) Olivier Rochus	(United States) James Cerretani (Germany) Frank Moser
10.09.	Slovenia	Ljubljana Challenger	$ 50,000	Clay	(Austria) Marco Mirnegg	(Russia) Alexander Kudryavtsev (Russia) Alexandre Krasnoroutskiy
10.09.	United States	New Orleans Challenger	$ 50,000	Hard	(South Africa) Kevin Anderson	(South Africa) Kevin Anderson (United States) Ryler DeHeart
10.09.	Spain	Sevilla Challenger	$ 50,000	Clay	(Portugal) Frederico Gil	(Spain) Marcel Granollers (Spain) Santiago Ventura
10.09.	Italy	Todi Challenger	$ 35,000	Clay	(Italy) Stefano Galvani	(Italy) Daniele Giorgini (Italy) Alessandro Motti
17.09.	Poland	Stettin Challenger	$ 125,000	Clay	(Argentina) Sergio Roitman	(Germany) Tomas Behrend (Germany) Christopher Kas
17.09.	United States	Lubbock Challenger	$ 50,000	Hard	(Australia) Robert Smeets	(United States) Alex Kuznetsov (United States) Ryan Sweeting
17.09.	Bosnia and Herzegovina	Banja Luka Challenger	$ 25,000	Clay	(Greece) Konstantinos Economidis	(Russia) Alexandre Krasnoroutskiy (Russia) Alexander Kudryavtsev
24.09.	France	Grenoble Challenger	$ 50,000	Hard (i)	(Ecuador) Nicolás Lapentti	(Netherlands) Jasper Smit (Netherlands) Martijn van Haasteren
24.09.	Slovakia	Trnava Challenger	$ 50,000	Clay	(Czech Republic) Jan Hernych	(Slovakia) Filip Polášek (Slovakia) Igor Zelenay
24.09.	United States	Tulsa Challenger	$ 50,000	Hard	(United States) Jesse Witten	(United States) Bobby Reynolds (United States) Rajeev Ram
24.09.	Roumania	Bukarest Challenger	$ 35,000	Clay	(Romania) Victor Hănescu	(Spain) Marcel Granollers (Spain) Santiago Ventura
24.09.	Italy	Neapel Challenger	$ 35,000	Clay	(Italy) Potito Starace	(Italy) Flavio Cipolla (Spain) Marcel Granollers

=== October ===
Date	Country	Tournament	Prizemoney	Surface	Singles champion	Doubles champions
01.10.	Belgium	Mons Challenger	$ 125,000	Hard (i)	(Latvia) Ernests Gulbis	(Poland) Tomasz Bednarek (Slovakia) Filip Polášek
01.10.	Spain	Tarragona Challenger	$ 50,000	Clay	(Spain) Alberto Martín	(Spain) Marcel Granollers (Spain) Santiago Ventura
01.10.	Colombia	Medellín Challenger	$ 25,000	Clay	(Argentina) Eduardo Schwank	(Uruguay) Pablo Cuevas (Argentina) Horacio Zeballos
08.10.	United States	Sacramento Challenger	$ 75,000	Hard	(United States) Wayne Odesnik	(United States) Robert Kendrick (United States) Brian Wilson
08.10.	France	Rennes Challenger	$ 50,000	Hard (i)	(Germany) Philipp Petzschner	(Germany) Philipp Petzschner (Germany) Björn Phau
08.10.	Ecuador	Quito Challenger	$ 25,000	Clay	(Colombia) Santiago Giraldo	(Argentina) Brian Dabul (Brazil) Marcos Daniel
15.10.	France	Challenger 42	$ 125,000	Hard (i)	(France) Thierry Ascione	(Argentina) Martín García (Argentina) Sebastián Prieto
15.10.	Colombia	Bogotá Challenger III	$ 75,000	Clay	(Brazil) Marcos Daniel	(Brazil) Thomaz Bellucci (Brazil) Bruno Soares
15.10.	United States	Calabasas Challenger	$ 50,000	Hard	(United States) Robert Kendrick	(United States) John Isner (United States) Brian Wilson
15.10.	Denmark	Kolding Challenger	$ 50,000	Hard (i)	(Slovakia) Lukáš Lacko	(Denmark) Frederik Nielsen (Denmark) Rasmus Nørby
22.10.	South Korea	Seoul Challenger	$ 125,000	Hard	(Israel) Dudi Sela	(South Africa) Rik de Voest (Chinese Taipei) Lu Yen-hsun
22.10.	United Kingdom	Tarka Challenger	$ 25,000	Hard (i)	(France) Jérémy Chardy	(Denmark) Frederik Nielsen (Pakistan) Aisam-ul-Haq Qureshi
22.10.	Canada	Rimouski Challenger	$ 25,000	Carpet (i)	(United States) Brendan Evans	(New Zealand) Daniel King-Turner (Australia) Robert Smeets
29.10.	South Korea	Busan Challenger	$ 100,000	Hard	(Chinese Taipei) Jimmy Wang	(Ukraine) Sergei Bubka (United States) John Paul Fruttero
29.10.	Uruguay	Montevideo Challenger	$ 75,000	Clay	(Spain) Santiago Ventura	(Uruguay) Pablo Cuevas (Peru) Luis Horna
29.10.	Germany	Lambertz Open by STAWAG	$ 50,000	Carpet (i)	(Russia) Evgeny Korolev	(Germany) Philipp Petzschner (Austria) Alexander Peya
29.10.	United States	Louisville Challenger	$ 50,000	Hard (i)	(Germany) Matthias Bachinger	(United States) John Isner (United States) Travis Parrott

=== November ===
Date	Country	Tournament	Prizemoney	Surface	Singles champion	Doubles champions
05.11.	Slovakia	Bratislava Challenger	$ 100,000	Hard (i)	(Italy) Simone Bolelli	(Czech Republic) Tomáš Cibulec (Czech Republic) Jaroslav Levinský
05.11.	Paraguay	Asunción Challenger	$ 75,000	Clay	(Brazil) Franco Ferreiro	(Argentina) Carlos Berlocq (Argentina) Martín Vassallo Argüello
05.11.	United States	Nashville Challenger	$ 75,000	Hard (i)	(United States) Jesse Levine	(United States) Rajeev Ram (United States) Bobby Reynolds
05.11.	Ecuador	Guayaquil Challenger	$ 50,000	Clay	(Ecuador) Nicolás Lapentti	(Argentina) Brian Dabul (Argentina) Juan Pablo Guzmán
05.11.	Tunisia	Tunis Challenger	$ 35,000	Hard	(Italy) Simone Bolelli	(Poland) Łukasz Kubot (Austria) Oliver Marach
05.11.	Germany	Bauer Watertechnology Cup	$ 25,000	Carpet (i)	(Germany) Denis Gremelmayr	(Germany) Philipp Petzschner (Austria) Alexander Peya
12.11.	Ukraine	Dnipro Challenger	$ 125,000	Hard (i)	(Germany) Mischa Zverev	(Germany) Christopher Kas (Croatia) Lovro Zovko
12.11.	Argentina	Buenos Aires Challenger	$ 75,000	Clay	(Argentina) Sergio Roitman	(Brazil) Marcelo Melo (Argentina) Sebastián Prieto
12.11.	France	Champaign Challenger	$ 50,000	Hard (i)	(United States) Jesse Levine	(Israel) Harel Levy (United States) Sam Warburg
12.11.	Finland	Helsinki Challenger	$ 50,000	Hard (i)	(Belgium) Steve Darcis	(Russia) Mikhail Elgin (Russia) Alexander Kudryavtsev
12.11.	China	Kaohsiung Challenger	$ 50,000	Hard	(Chinese Taipei) Lu Yen-hsun	(India) Stephen Amritraj (Israel) Dudi Sela
19.11.	Malaysia	Malaysia Open	$ 150,000	Carpet (i)	(Germany) Rainer Schüttler	(Australia) Stephen Huss (South Africa) Wesley Moodie
19.11.	United States	Knoxville Challenger	$ 50,000	Hard (i)	(United States) Robert Kendrick	(Israel) Harel Levy (United States) Sam Warburg
19.11.	Peru	Lima Challenger	$ 50,000	Clay	(Uruguay) Pablo Cuevas	(Uruguay) Pablo Cuevas (Argentina) Eduardo Schwank
19.11.	Japan	Yokohama Challenger	$ 35,000	Hard	(Israel) Dudi Sela	(Japan) Hiroki Kondo (Japan) Go Soeda
19.11.	Australia	Caloundra Challenger	$ 25,000	Hard	(Australia) Joseph Sirianni	(Chinese Taipei) Chen Ti (South Korea) Jun Woong-sun
19.11.	Mexico	Puebla Challenger	$ 25,000	Hard	(Argentina) Leonardo Mayer	(Australia) Raphael Durek (Poland) Dawid Olejniczak
19.11.	United Kingdom	LTA Shrewsbury Challenger	$ 25,000	Hard (i)	(Russia) Igor Kunitsyn	(Denmark) Frederik Nielsen (Denmark) Rasmus Nørby
26.11.	India	Neu-Delhi Challenger I	$ 50,000	Hard	(Pakistan) Aisam-ul-Haq Qureshi	(South Africa) Rik de Voest (South Africa) Wesley Moodie
26.11.	Australia	Brisbane Challenger	$ 25,000	Hard (i)	(Australia) Joseph Sirianni	(Australia) Rameez Junaid (New Zealand) Daniel King-Turner

=== December ===
Date	Country	Tournament	Prizemoney	Surface	Singles champion	Doubles champions
03.12.	India	Neu-Delhi Challenger II	$ 50,000	Hard	(Russia) Mikhail Elgin	(China) Yu Xinyuan (China) Zeng Shaoxuan
03.12.	Australia	Burnie Challenger II	$ 35,000	Hard	(Australia) Alun Jones	(Australia) Sam Groth (Australia) Joseph Sirianni
