= Grenoble Challenger =

Defunct tennis tournament
- Location: Grenoble; France
- Venue: Stade Antoine Lovera
- Category: ATP Challenger Series
- Surface: Hard / Indoors
- Draw: 32S/16Q/16D
- Prize money: $50,000

The Grenoble Challenger was a tennis tournament held in Grenoble, France from 1999 until 2008. The event was part of the ATP Challenger Series and was played on indoor hardcourts.

== Past finals ==
=== Singles ===
Year	Champion	Runner-up	Score
1999	(France) Julien Boutter	(France) Antony Dupuis	6–2, 4–6, 6–4
2000	(France) Antony Dupuis	(Netherlands) Jan Siemerink	7–6^{10}, 7–6^{11}
2001	(Sweden) Johan Settergren	(Croatia) Ivan Ljubičić	5–7, 7–6^{4}, 7–5
2002	(France) Michaël Llodra	(Georgia (country)) Irakli Labadze	6–4, 6–3
2003	(France) Richard Gasquet	(Israel) Harel Levy	7–5, 7–6^{1}
2004	(Slovakia) Karol Kučera	(France) Nicolas Mahut	7–5, 6–2
2005	(France) Marc Gicquel	(Sweden) Thomas Enqvist	6–0, 6–2
2006	(France) Michaël Llodra	(France) Nicolas Tourte	6–2, 6–2
2007	(Ecuador) Nicolás Lapentti	(Denmark) Kristian Pless	6–3, 7–5
2008	(Belgium) Kristof Vliegen	(France) Alexandre Sidorenko	6–4, 6–3

=== Doubles ===
Year	Champion	Runner-up	Score
1999	(United States) Adam Peterson (United States) Chris Tontz	(Argentina) Martín García (Brazil) Cristiano Testa	4–6, 6–3, 6–4
2000	(Austria) Julian Knowle (Switzerland) Lorenzo Manta	(Switzerland) Yves Allegro (France) Julien Cuaz	6–3, 6–4
2001	(Israel) Jonathan Erlich (Israel) Andy Ram	(South Africa) Paul Rosner (United States) Glenn Weiner	6–4, 3–6, 7–6^{4}
2002	(Australia) Todd Larkham (Australia) Michael Tebbutt	(Italy) Massimo Bertolini (Italy) Cristian Brandi	4–6, 6–3, 6–4
2003	(Australia) Paul Baccanello (Israel) Harel Levy	(South Africa) Rik de Voest (Sweden) Johan Landsberg	5–7, 6–4, 7–6^{5}
2004	(Italy) Uros Vico (Croatia) Lovro Zovko	(Germany) Michael Berrer (Romania) Răzvan Sabău	6–2, 6–4
2005	(France) Julien Benneteau (France) Nicolas Mahut	(France) Grégory Carraz (France) Nicolas Tourte	4–6, 6–4, 6–3
2006	(Russia) Teymuraz Gabashvili (Russia) Evgeny Korolev	(France) Thomas Oger (France) Nicolas Tourte	7–5, 6–4
2007	(Netherlands) Jasper Smit (Netherlands) Martijn van Haasteren	(Denmark) Frederik Nielsen (Denmark) Martin Pedersen	6–3, 6–1
2008	(Austria) Martin Fischer (Austria) Philipp Oswald	(Belgium) Niels Desein (Belgium) Dick Norman	^{5}6–7, 7–5, [10–7]
