= Shelbourne Irish Open =

Defunct tennis tournament
- Location: Dublin, Ireland
- Venue: Fitzwilliam Lawn Tennis Club
- Category: ATP Challenger Series
- Surface: Carpet / Outdoors
- Draw: 32S/32Q/16D
- Prize money: €64,000
- Website: Official Website

The Shelbourne Irish Open was a tennis tournament held in Dublin, Ireland between 2006 and 2008. The event was part of the Challenger series and was played on outdoor carpet courts.

== Past finals ==
=== Singles ===
Year	Champion	Runner-up	Score
2008	(Australia) Robert Smeets	(Denmark) Frederik Nielsen	7–6, 6–2
2007	(India) Rohan Bopanna	(Denmark) Martin Pedersen	6–4, 6–3
2006	(Germany) Mischa Zverev	(Denmark) Kristian Pless	7–5, 7–6

=== Doubles ===
Year	Champion	Runner-up	Score
2008	(India) Prakash Amritraj (Pakistan) Aisam-ul-Haq Qureshi	(United Kingdom) Jonathan Marray (Denmark) Frederik Nielsen	6–3, 7–6
2007	(India) Rohan Bopanna (Australia) Adam Feeney	(Germany) Lars Burgsmüller (Germany) Mischa Zverev	6–2, 6–2
2006	(Netherlands) Jasper Smit (Netherlands) Martijn van Haasteren	(United Kingdom) Colin Fleming (United Kingdom) Jamie Murray	6–3, 2–6, [10–8]
