= Diego Hartfield =

Argentine politician and tennis player (born 1981)

- Country (sports): Argentina
- Residence: Buenos Aires, Argentina
- Born: 31 January 1981 (age 45) Oberá, Argentina
- Height: 1.85 m (6 ft 1 in)
- Turned pro: 2006
- Retired: 2010
- Plays: Right-handed (two-handed backhand)
- Prize money: $571,141

Singles
- Career record: 18–28
- Career titles: 0
- Highest ranking: No. 73 (10 September 2007)

Grand Slam singles results
- Australian Open: 1R (2008)
- French Open: 2R (2007)
- Wimbledon: 1R (2007)
- US Open: 1R (2007)

Doubles
- Career record: 4–12
- Career titles: 0
- Highest ranking: No. 149 (9 June 2008)

Grand Slam doubles results
- Wimbledon: Q1 (2006)
- US Open: 1R (2007)
- Last updated on: 15 November 2021.

Diego Hartfield (born 31 January 1981), nicknamed "El Gato Hartfield" (Hartfield the Cat in Spanish) is an Argentine politician and former tennis player on the ATP Tour from Argentina.

== Career ==
- 2000 — Hartfield began his professional tennis career by playing Futures in South America.
- 2001 — He reached his first career Futures final in Mendoza (Argentina), was three times Doubles finalist at Futures, and won one title in Asunción (Paraguay).
- 2002 — He won his first career Futures Singles title in Viña del Mar (Chile) and reached the final in Santa Cruz (Bolivia). He won two Doubles titles in Bolivia at the Cochabamba and Santa Cruz Futures and reached the final in La Paz (Bolivia).
- 2003 — Hartfield won the Futures title in Viña del Mar for the second time. He reached the Singles finals in Uruguay and Buenos Aires. He won a Futures doubles title in Santiago de Chile and reached three finals in Argentina, Uruguay, and Slovenia.
- 2004 — He won a Futures title at Santiago de Chile and three Futures doubles titles in San Salvador, Netherlands (Alkmaar), and France (Blois).
- 2005 — He reached his first career Challenger Singles final in Buenos Aires and in Doubles in Nashville (USA). He won a Futures title in Córdoba (Argentina), reached the Futures Singles final in Colombia, but won the title in Doubles.
- 2006 — He won three Challenger titles in Atlanta (USA), Tunica Resorts (USA), Bogotá (Colombia) and entered the Top 125 for the first time. He played his first Grand Slam in Roland Garros as a qualifier and entered the main draw, but lost to world No. 1 Roger Federer.
- 2007 — Hartfield reached the final of the São Paulo Challenger and advanced to his first ATP SF in his hometown of Buenos Aires. He reached the semis at the Prague and San Marino Challengers. He was Doubles finalist at the Challenger in Andrézieux (France) and Singles finalist in Bogotá (Colombia). In Roland Garros, he defeated Robby Ginepri in five sets in the first round before losing to Federer in the second round. For the first time, he reached a QF indoor in Lyon (France), and continuing to improve his ranking, he finished in the Top 100 for the first time.
- 2008 — He reached the Singles Challenger final in Milano (Italy) and Scheveningen (the Netherlands) and the Doubles final at the Bordeaux Challenger (France).
- 2009 — During a practice at the Copa Petrobras Challenger in Buenos Aires, Diego twisted his knee and tore its ligaments. The same accident happened to his other knee at the Copa Telmex in Buenos Aires. After two surgeries that took him away from the courts until September, he made a short comeback at Futures in Adrogué (Argentina). After the injuries, he trained to be back on tour during Spring 2010.
- 2010 — Hartfield announced his retirement from professional tennis.

== Political career ==
Hartfield ran as the lead candidate for the La Libertad Avanza (LLA) party in the 2025 Misiones provincial election. LLA came in second and Hartfield became the first of 5 deputes from the LLA slate that were elected to the provincial chamber.

== ITF Futures and ATP Challengers finals ==
=== Singles: 16 (7–9) ===
Legend ATP Challenger (3–4) ITF Futures (4–5)	Finals by surface Hard (0–1) Clay (7–8) Grass (0–0) Carpet (0–0)

Singles games
Result	W–L	Date	Tournament	Tier	Surface	Opponent	Score
Loss	0–1	Apr 2001	Argentina F4, Mendoza	Futures	Clay	(Argentina) Guillermo Carry	6–7^{(5–7)}, 3–6
Loss	0–2	Sep 2002	Bolivia F3, Santa Cruz	Futures	Clay	(Argentina) Cristian Villagrán	4–6, 4–6
Win	1–2	Oct 2002	Chile F5, Viña del Mar	Futures	Clay	(Austria) Marko Neunteibl	6–7^{(4–7)}, 6–0, 6–3
Loss	1–3	Sep 2003	Argentina F3, Buenos Aires	Futures	Clay	(Argentina) Carlos Berlocq	6–3, 3–6, 1–6
Win	2–3	Oct 2003	Chile F5, Santiago	Futures	Clay	(Argentina) Brian Dabul	6–4, 6–4
Loss	2–4	Nov 2003	Uruguay F1, Montevideo	Futures	Clay	(Argentina) Edgardo Massa	6–4, 3–6, 4–6
Win	3–4	Nov 2004	Chile F3, Santiago	Futures	Clay	(Austria) Marko Neunteibl	6–3, 6–7^{(7–9)}, 6–2
Loss	3–5	May 2005	Colombia F4, Pereira	Futures	Clay	(Brazil) Bruno Soares	2–6, 7–6^{(7–3)}, 3–6
Win	4–5	May 2005	Argentina F5, Córdoba	Futures	Clay	(Argentina) Rodolfo Daruich	6–7^{(4–7)}, 6–1, 6–4
Loss	4–6	Nov 2005	Buenos Aires, Argentina	Challenger	Clay	(Argentina) Carlos Berlocq	5–7, 6–3, 4–6
Win	5–6	May 2006	Atlanta, United States	Challenger	Clay	(Canada) Frank Dancevic	7–5, 6–0
Win	6–6	May 2006	Tunica Resorts, United States	Challenger	Clay	(United States) Mardy Fish	6–4, 6–4
Win	7–6	Oct 2006	Bogotá, Colombia	Challenger	Clay	(Austria) Daniel Köllerer	6–3, 7–5
Loss	7–7	Jan 2007	São Paulo, Brazil	Challenger	Hard	(Argentina) Guillermo Cañas	3–6, 4–6
Loss	7–8	Jun 2008	Milan, Italy	Challenger	Clay	(Russia) Teymuraz Gabashvili	4–6, 6–4, 4–6
Loss	7–9	Jul 2008	Scheveningen, Netherlands	Challenger	Clay	(Netherlands) Jesse Huta Galung	3–6, 4–6

=== Doubles: 19 (10–9) ===
Legend ATP Challenger (2–2) ITF Futures (8–7)	Finals by surface Hard (0–2) Clay (10–7) Grass (0–0) Carpet (0–0)

Doubles games
Result	W–L	Date	Tournament	Tier	Surface	Partner	Opponents	Score
Loss	0–1	May 2001	Argentina F5, Córdoba	Futures	Clay	(Argentina) Ignacio González King	(Argentina) Mariano Delfino (Argentina) Patricio Rudi	6–7^{(5–7)}, 3–6
Loss	0–2	Aug 2001	Argentina F7, Buenos Aires	Futures	Clay	(Argentina) Juan Pablo Guzmán	(Argentina) Daniel Caracciolo (Argentina) Martín Vassallo Argüello	6–3, 2–6, 2–6
Win	1–2	Oct 2001	Paraguay F1, Asunción	Futures	Clay	(Argentina) Matias O'Neille	(Argentina) Sebastián Decoud (Argentina) Sebastian Uriarte	6–3, 4–6, 7–6^{(9–7)}
Loss	1–3	Sep 2002	Bolivia F1, La Paz	Futures	Clay	(Argentina) Ignacio González King	(United States) Casey Smith (Argentina) Martin Stringari	3–6, 5–7
Win	2–3	Sep 2002	Bolivia F2, Cochabamba	Futures	Clay	(Argentina) Ignacio González King	(United States) Casey Smith (Argentina) Martin Stringari	7–5, 3–6, 6–1
Win	3–3	Sep 2002	Bolivia F3, Santa Cruz	Futures	Clay	(Argentina) Ignacio González King	(Argentina) Sebastián Decoud (Chile) Juan-Felipe Yáñez	7–5, 6–2
Loss	3–4	Jun 2003	Slovenia F1, Kranj	Futures	Clay	(Argentina) Ignacio González King	(Croatia) Ivan Cerović (Socialist Federal Republic of Yugoslavia) Aleksander Slovic	6–7^{(1–7)}, 7–6^{(8–6)}, 4–6
Win	4–4	Oct 2003	Chile F4, Santiago	Futures	Clay	(Argentina) Patricio Rudi	(Argentina) Diego Junqueira (Argentina) Edgardo Massa	6–2, 2–6, 7–6^{(7–4)}
Loss	4–5	Oct 2003	Argentina F4, Mendoza	Futures	Clay	(Argentina) Damián Patriarca	(Argentina) Brian Dabul (Argentina) Diego Moyano	6–7^{(4–7)}, 4–6
Loss	4–6	Nov 2003	Uruguay F1, Montevideo	Futures	Clay	(Argentina) Sebastián Decoud	(Argentina) Gustavo Marcaccio (Argentina) Patricio Rudi	4–6, 4–6
Win	5–6	Jan 2004	El Salvador F1, San Salvador	Futures	Clay	(Argentina) Gustavo Marcaccio	(Brazil) Lucas Engel (Brazil) Márcio Torres	6–0, 6–2
Loss	5–7	May 2004	Colombia F1, Cali	Futures	Clay	(Argentina) Damián Patriarca	(Colombia) Michael Quintero Aguilar (Colombia) Carlos Salamanca	5–7, 4–6
Win	6–7	Jun 2004	France F8, Blois	Futures	Clay	(Argentina) Brian Dabul	(Belgium) Steve Darcis (Belgium) Stefan Wauters	7–5, 6–4
Win	7–7	Jun 2004	Netherlands F1, Alkmaar	Futures	Clay	(Argentina) Cristian Villagrán	(Japan) Jun Kato (Netherlands Antilles) Jean-Julien Rojer	6–2, 6–3
Win	8–7	May 2005	Colombia F4, Pereira	Futures	Clay	(Mexico) Daniel Garza	(Colombia) Pablo González (Brazil) Bruno Soares	7–6^{(7–4)}, 7–6^{(7–1)}
Loss	8–8	Nov 2005	Nashville, United States	Challenger	Hard	(Mexico) Santiago González	(Serbia) Ilija Bozoljac (United States) Brian Wilson	6–7^{(6–8)}, 4–6
Win	9–8	Mar 2007	Bogotá, Colombia	Challenger	Clay	(Argentina) Martín García	(Portugal) Fred Gil (Belgium) Dick Norman	6–4, 3–6, [10–5]
Loss	9–9	Oct 2007	Andrézieux, France	Challenger	Hard	(Argentina) José Acasuso	(Argentina) Martín García (Argentina) SebastiaPrieto	3–6, 1–6
Win	10–9	May 2008	Bordeaux, France	Challenger	Clay	(Argentina) Sergio Roitman	(Poland) Tomasz Bednarek (Serbia) Dušan Vemić	6–4, 6–4

== Performance timeline ==
Key
W	F	SF	QF	#R	RR	Q#	DNQ	A	NH

(W) winner; (F) finalist; (SF) semifinalist; (QF) quarterfinalist; (#R) rounds 4, 3, 2, 1; (RR) round-robin stage; (Q#) qualification round; (DNQ) did not qualify; (A) absent; (NH) not held; (SR) strike rate (events won / competed); (W–L) win–loss record.

=== Singles ===
Grand Slam tournaments
Tournament	2005	2006	2007	2008	SR	W–L	Win%
Australian Open	Q1	Q1	A	1R	0 / 1	0–1	0%
French Open	A	1R	2R	Q2	0 / 2	1–2	33%
Wimbledon	Q2	Q3	1R	A	0 / 1	0–1	0%
US Open	Q1	Q1	1R	Q3	0 / 1	0–1	0%
Win–loss	0–0	0–1	1–3	0–1	0 / 5	1–5	17%

ATP Tour Masters 1000
Tournament	2005	2006	2007	2008	SR	W–L	Win%
Indian Wells	A	Q1	A	A	0 / 0	0–0	–
Miami	A	A	A	Q2	0 / 0	0–0	–
Win–loss	0–0	0–0	0–0	0–0	0 / 0	0–0	–
