= Alessandro Gravina =

Canadian tennis player

- Full name: Alessandro Gravina
- Country (sports): Canada
- Born: September 20, 1979 (age 45); Toronto, Ontario, Canada
- Prize money: $3,437

Singles
- Career record: 0–0
- Career titles: 0; 0 Challenger, 0 Futures
- Highest ranking: No. 1215 (1 August 2005)

Grand Slam singles results
- Australian Open: Q1 (2018)

Doubles
- Career record: 0–0
- Career titles: 0; 1 Challenger, 0 Futures
- Highest ranking: No. 582 (5 February 2007)
- Davis Cup: 0–0
- Last updated on: 4 June 2022.

Alessandro Gravina (born 20 September 1979), also known as Alex Gravina, is a Canadian former professional tennis player active in the 1990s and 2000s.

Gravina was born in Toronto and is of Italian descent. His most notable achievement in professional tennis was winning the doubles title at the Challenger de Granby, a tournament on the ATP Challenger Tour.

== ATP Challenger and ITF Futures finals ==
=== Doubles: 1 (1–0) ===
Legend ATP Challenger (1–0) ITF Futures (0–0)	Finals by surface Hard (1–0) Clay (0–0) Grass (0–0) Carpet (0–0)

Result	W–L	Date	Tournament	Tier	Surface	Partner	Opponents	Score
Win	1–0	Jul 2006	Granby, Canada	Challenger	Hard	(France) Gary Lugassy	(Chinese Taipei) Lu Yen-hsun (Germany) Frank Moser	6–2, 7–6^{(2)}
