= Jean-François Bachelot =

French tennis player

- Country (sports): France
- Residence: Toulouse, France
- Born: 11 June 1977 (age 47); Perpignan, France
- Height: 1.83 m (6 ft 0 in)
- Turned pro: 1996
- Plays: Right-handed (one-handed backhand)
- Coach: Ronan Lafaix
- Prize money: $395,248

Singles
- Career record: 4–7
- Career titles: 0; 2 Challenger, 4 Futures
- Highest ranking: No. 134 (13 January 2003)

Grand Slam singles results
- Australian Open: 2R (2002)
- French Open: 1R (1998)
- Wimbledon: 1R (2002)
- US Open: Q3 (2002)

Doubles
- Career record: 14–22
- Career titles: 0; 8 Challenger, 17 Futures
- Highest ranking: No. 74 (14 February 2005)

Grand Slam doubles results
- Australian Open: 1R (2005)
- French Open: 2R (2006)
- Wimbledon: 3R (2004)
- US Open: 2R (2004)

Grand Slam mixed doubles results
- French Open: 2R (2005)
- Last updated on: 7 June 2023.

Jean-François Bachelot (French: [ʒɑ̃ fʁɑ̃swa baʃlo]; born 11 June 1977) is a former tour professional tennis player from France.

== Playing style ==
Bachelot played with typical French "flair", possessing a powerful serve and groundstrokes, whilst being comfortable at the net.

== ATP career finals ==
=== Doubles: 1 (1 runner-up) ===
| Legend Grand Slam Tournaments (0–0) ATP World Tour Finals (0–0) ATP World Tour Masters Series (0–0) ATP Championship Series (0–0) ATP World Series (0–1) | Finals by surface Hard (0–0) Clay (0–0) Grass (0–0) Carpet (0–1) | Finals by setting Outdoors (0–0) Indoors (0–1) |

| Result | W–L | Date | Tournament | Tier | Surface | Partner | Opponents | Score |
|---|---|---|---|---|---|---|---|---|
| Loss | 0–1 | Feb 2005 | Milan, Italy | International Series | Carpet | (France) Arnaud Clément | (Italy) Daniele Bracciali (Italy) Giorgio Galimberti | 7–6^{(10–8)}, 6–7^{(6–8)}, 4–6 |

== ATP Challenger and ITF Futures finals ==
=== Singles: 15 (6–9) ===
| Legend ATP Challenger (2–1) ITF Futures (4–8) | Finals by surface Hard (4–9) Clay (0–0) Grass (1–0) Carpet (1–0) |

| Result | W–L | Date | Tournament | Tier | Surface | Opponent | Score |
|---|---|---|---|---|---|---|---|
| Loss | 0–1 | Oct 1998 | France F8, Nevers | Futures | Hard | (France) Rodolphe Gilbert | 6–2, 6–7, 3–6 |
| Loss | 0–2 | Mar 1999 | Philippines F1, Manila | Futures | Hard | (Sweden) Jan Hermansson | 6–7, 4–6 |
| Loss | 0–3 | Sep 1999 | France F12, Plaisir | Futures | Hard | (France) Michaël Llodra | 6–4, 6–7, 6–7 |
| Loss | 0–4 | Oct 1999 | France F13, Nevers | Futures | Hard | (Netherlands) Rogier Wassen | 6–3, 2–6, 4–6 |
| Loss | 0–5 | Aug 2000 | Belo Horizonte, Brazil | Challenger | Hard | (Serbia) Nenad Zimonjić | 3–6, 7–6^{(8–6)}, 5–7 |
| Win | 1–5 | Jul 2001 | Manchester, United Kingdom | Challenger | Grass | (United Kingdom) Jamie Delgado | 6–4, 6–4 |
| Win | 2–5 | Aug 2002 | Córdoba, Spain | Challenger | Hard | (Italy) Cristiano Caratti | 7–5, 3–6, 6–4 |
| Win | 3–5 | Oct 2003 | France F21, La Roche-sur-Yon | Futures | Hard | (France) Florent Serra | 7–6^{(9–7)}, 7–6^{(7–5)} |
| Loss | 3–6 | Oct 2004 | France F17, Nevers | Futures | Hard | (France) Bertrand Contzler | 3–6, 4–6 |
| Win | 4–6 | Sep 2005 | Great Britain F10, Nottingham | Futures | Hard | (United Kingdom) Colin Fleming | 6–2, 6–1 |
| Loss | 4–7 | Mar 2006 | Great Britain F4, Manchester | Futures | Hard | (United Kingdom) Richard Bloomfield | 5–7, 6–3, 6–7^{(2–7)} |
| Win | 5–7 | May 2006 | Uzbekistan F4, Andijan | Futures | Hard | (Russia) Pavel Ivanov | 7–6^{(7–3)}, 6–3 |
| Win | 6–7 | Jun 2006 | Spain F18, Tenerife | Futures | Carpet | (Spain) Óscar Burrieza López | 6–4, 7–6^{(7–3)} |
| Loss | 6–8 | Jun 2006 | Spain F19, La Palma | Futures | Hard | (France) Nicolas Tourte | 1–6, 7–6^{(9–7)}, 5–7 |
| Loss | 6–9 | Sep 2006 | France F13, Mulhouse | Futures | Hard | (France) Nicolas Tourte | 3–6, 2–6 |

=== Doubles: 31 (25–6) ===
| Legend ATP Challenger (8–3) ITF Futures (17–3) | Finals by surface Hard (18–5) Clay (2–0) Grass (3–1) Carpet (2–0) |

| Result | W–L | Date | Tournament | Tier | Surface | Partner | Opponents | Score |
|---|---|---|---|---|---|---|---|---|
| Loss | 0–1 | Apr 1999 | Indonesia F1, Jakarta | Futures | Hard | (France) Jean-Michel Pequery | (Indonesia) Sulistyo Wibowo (Indonesia) Bonit Wiryawan | 3–6, 6–3, 5–7 |
| Loss | 0–2 | Sep 1999 | France F11, Mulhouse | Futures | Hard | (Germany) Erik Truempler | (France) Julien Cuaz (France) Lionel Roux | 3–6, 6–7 |
| Loss | 0–3 | Apr 2003 | Bangalore, India | Challenger | Hard | (Switzerland) Yves Allegro | (France) Rodolphe Cadart (France) Gregory Carraz | 4–6, 4–6 |
| Loss | 0–4 | Jun 2003 | Surbiton, United Kingdom | Challenger | Grass | (France) Gregory Carraz | (Australia) Joshua Eagle (Australia) Andrew Kratzmann | 3–6, 2–6 |
| Win | 1–4 | Jul 2003 | Bristol, United Kingdom | Challenger | Grass | (France) Nicolas Mahut | (United Kingdom) Daniel Kiernan (United Kingdom) David Sherwood | 7–6^{(7–4)}, 5–7, 7–6^{(7–5)} |
| Loss | 1–5 | Aug 2003 | Segovia, Spain | Challenger | Hard | (Spain) Emilio Benfele Álvarez | (Czech Republic) Ota Fukárek (United States) Tripp Phillips | 4–6, 6–7^{(6–8)} |
| Win | 2–5 | Feb 2004 | Andrezieux, France | Challenger | Hard | (Switzerland) Yves Allegro | (Austria) Alexander Peya (Netherlands) Rogier Wassen | 6–4, 5–7, 6–4 |
| Win | 3–5 | Mar 2004 | France F4, Lille | Futures | Hard | (France) Jean-Michel Pequery | (France) Marc Gicquel (France) Édouard Roger-Vasselin | 7–6^{(7–4)}, 6–3 |
| Win | 4–5 | May 2004 | Aix En Provence, France | Challenger | Clay | (France) Thierry Ascione | (Argentina) Federico Browne (Netherlands) Rogier Wassen | 6–4, 5–7, 6–4 |
| Win | 5–5 | Jul 2004 | Manchester, United Kingdom | Challenger | Grass | (France) Nicolas Mahut | (Pakistan) Aisam Qureshi (Croatia) Lovro Zovko | 6–2, 6–4 |
| Win | 6–5 | Jul 2004 | Valladolid, Spain | Challenger | Grass | (France) Nicolas Mahut | (Pakistan) Aisam Qureshi (Sweden) Michael Ryderstedt | 6–3, 6–4 |
| Win | 7–5 | Aug 2004 | Samarkand, Uzbekistan | Challenger | Clay | (Netherlands) Melle van Gemerden | (Germany) Sebastian Fitz (Romania) Florin Mergea | 6–2, 3–6, 6–1 |
| Win | 8–5 | Sep 2004 | France F15, Plaisir | Futures | Hard | (France) Jean-Michel Pequery | (France) Marc Auradou (France) Arnaud Delgado | 6–2, 6–0 |
| Win | 9–5 | Oct 2004 | France F18, Saint-Dizier | Futures | Hard | (Romania) Florin Mergea | (Tunisia) Walid Jallali (United States) Jamal Parker | 6–2, 6–3 |
| Win | 10–5 | Oct 2004 | France F19, La Roche-sur-Yon | Futures | Hard | (France) Xavier Audouy | (Spain) Daniel Muñoz de la Nava (Slovakia) Igor Zelenay | 3–6, 6–1, 6–2 |
| Win | 11–5 | Apr 2005 | Greece F1, Kalamata | Futures | Hard | (France) Gary Lugassy | (Czech Republic) Petr Kralert (United Kingdom) Jonathan Marray | 7–5, 6–4 |
| Win | 12–5 | Oct 2005 | France F19, Rodez | Futures | Hard | (France) Xavier Audouy | (Netherlands) Jesse Huta Galung (Netherlands) Melvyn Op Der Heijde | 7–6^{(7–3)}, 6–4 |
| Win | 13–5 | Jan 2006 | Wrexham, United Kingdom | Challenger | Hard | (France) Stéphane Robert | (United Kingdom) Colin Fleming (United Kingdom) Jamie Murray | 6–4, 7–5 |
| Win | 14–5 | Feb 2006 | Croatia F1, Zagreb | Futures | Hard | (France) Nicolas Tourte | (Germany) Tobias Klein (Germany) Mischa Zverev | 7–6^{(9–7)}, 7–6^{(7–3)} |
| Win | 15–5 | Mar 2006 | Cherbourg, France | Challenger | Hard | (France) Stéphane Robert | (Thailand) Sonchat Ratiwatana (Thailand) Sanchai Ratiwatana | 7–6^{(7–5)}, 6–3 |
| Loss | 15–6 | Mar 2006 | Great Britain F3, Sunderland | Futures | Hard | (Pakistan) Aisam Qureshi | (Italy) Alessandro Motti (Spain) Daniel Muñoz de la Nava | 3–6, 4–6 |
| Win | 16–6 | Mar 2006 | Great Britain F4, Manchester | Futures | Hard | (Pakistan) Aisam Qureshi | (United Kingdom) Martin Lee (United Kingdom) David Sherwood | 6–1, 3–6, 6–2 |
| Win | 17–6 | Apr 2006 | Great Britain F6, Bath | Futures | Hard | (France) Jean-Michel Pequery | (France) Olivier Charroin (France) Nicolas Tourte | 4–6, 6–4, 6–3 |
| Win | 18–6 | Apr 2006 | Italy F10, Cremona | Futures | Hard | (France) David Guez | (Romania) Bogdan-Victor Leonte (Brazil) Rogério Dutra Silva | 6–4, 6–3 |
| Win | 19–6 | May 2006 | Uzbekistan F3, Namangan | Futures | Hard | (France) Nicolas Tourte | (Kazakhstan) Mikhail Kukushkin (Kazakhstan) Aleksandr Nedovyesov | 7–5, 6–3 |
| Win | 20–6 | Jun 2006 | Spain F18, Tenerife | Futures | Carpet | (France) Nicolas Tourte | (Germany) Tony Holzinger (United Kingdom) James Ward | 6–4, 6–3 |
| Win | 21–6 | Jun 2006 | Spain F19, La Palma | Futures | Hard | (France) Nicolas Tourte | (Spain) Mariano Albert-Ferrando (Spain) Andreu Guilera-Jover | 6–3, 6–4 |
| Win | 22–6 | Jul 2006 | Ireland F2, Dublin | Futures | Carpet | (France) Nicolas Tourte | (Latvia) Andis Juška (Germany) Mischa Zverev | 7–6^{(7–4)}, 6–1 |
| Win | 23–6 | Oct 2006 | France F16, Nevers | Futures | Hard | (France) David Guez | (Ukraine) Sergey Bubka (Slovakia) Pavol Červenák | 6–3, 6–4 |
| Win | 24–6 | Oct 2006 | France F18, La Roche-sur-Yon | Futures | Hard | (Uzbekistan) Denis Istomin | (France) Jeremy Blandin (France) Charles-Antoine Brézac | 7–6^{(7–1)}, 5–7, 6–4 |
| Win | 25–6 | Jan 2007 | Great Britain F2, Sunderland | Futures | Hard | (France) Stéphane Robert | (Italy) Fabio Colangelo (Italy) Marco Crugnola | 6–3, 6–4 |

== Performance Timelines ==
Key
| W | F | SF | QF | #R | RR | Q# | P# | DNQ | A | Z# | PO | G | S | B | NMS | NTI | P | NH |

(W) winner; (F) finalist; (SF) semifinalist; (QF) quarterfinalist; (#R) rounds 4, 3, 2, 1; (RR) round-robin stage; (Q#) qualification round; (P#) preliminary round; (DNQ) did not qualify; (A) absent; (Z#) Davis/Fed Cup Zonal Group (with number indication) or (PO) play-off; (G) gold, (S) silver or (B) bronze Olympic/Paralympic medal; (NMS) not a Masters tournament; (NTI) not a Tier I tournament; (P) postponed; (NH) not held; (SR) strike rate (events won / competed); (W–L) win–loss record.

=== Singles ===
| Tournament | 1996 | 1997 | 1998 | 1999 | 2000 | 2001 | 2002 | 2003 | 2004 | 2005 | SR | W–L | Win % |
|---|---|---|---|---|---|---|---|---|---|---|---|---|---|
Grand Slam Tournaments
| Australian Open | A | A | Q2 | A | A | Q1 | 2R | Q1 | A | Q3 | 0 / 1 | 1–1 | 50% |
| French Open | Q1 | Q2 | 1R | A | A | Q3 | Q1 | Q1 | Q1 | A | 0 / 1 | 0–1 | 0% |
| Wimbledon | A | Q1 | Q1 | A | Q3 | Q1 | 1R | Q2 | Q2 | A | 0 / 1 | 0–1 | 0% |
| US Open | A | Q2 | Q1 | A | Q1 | Q1 | Q3 | Q1 | A | A | 0 / 0 | 0–0 | – |
| Win–loss | 0–0 | 0–0 | 0–1 | 0–0 | 0–0 | 0–0 | 1–2 | 0–0 | 0–0 | 0–0 | 0 / 3 | 1–3 | 25% |
ATP Tour Masters 1000
| Miami | A | A | A | A | A | A | A | Q1 | A | A | 0 / 0 | 0–0 | – |
| Monte Carlo | A | A | A | A | A | A | A | Q1 | A | A | 0 / 0 | 0–0 | – |
| Paris | A | A | A | A | Q1 | A | Q2 | A | A | A | 0 / 0 | 0–0 | – |
| Win–loss | 0–0 | 0–0 | 0–0 | 0–0 | 0–0 | 0–0 | 0–0 | 0–0 | 0–0 | 0–0 | 0 / 0 | 0–0 | – |

=== Doubles ===
| Tournament | 1995 | 1996 | 1997 | 1998 | 1999 | 2000 | 2001 | 2002 | 2003 | 2004 | 2005 | 2006 | SR | W–L | Win % |
|---|---|---|---|---|---|---|---|---|---|---|---|---|---|---|---|
Grand Slam Tournaments
| Australian Open | A | A | A | A | A | A | A | A | A | A | 1R | A | 0 / 1 | 0–1 | 0% |
| French Open | 1R | 1R | 1R | A | A | A | 1R | 1R | 1R | 1R | 1R | 2R | 0 / 9 | 1–9 | 10% |
| Wimbledon | A | A | A | A | A | A | A | A | A | 3R | 2R | A | 0 / 2 | 3–2 | 60% |
| US Open | A | A | A | A | A | A | A | A | A | 2R | A | A | 0 / 1 | 1–1 | 50% |
| Win–loss | 0–1 | 0–1 | 0–1 | 0–0 | 0–0 | 0–0 | 0–1 | 0–1 | 0–1 | 3–3 | 1–3 | 1–1 | 0 / 13 | 5–13 | 28% |
ATP Tour Masters 1000
| Paris | A | A | A | A | A | Q2 | A | A | A | A | A | A | 0 / 0 | 0–0 | – |
| Win–loss | 0–0 | 0–0 | 0–0 | 0–0 | 0–0 | 0–0 | 0–0 | 0–0 | 0–0 | 0–0 | 0–0 | 0–0 | 0 / 0 | 0–0 | – |
