= Martin Pedersen (tennis) =

Danish tennis player

- Country (sports): Denmark
- Residence: Denmark
- Born: 15 June 1987 (age 37); Denmark
- Turned pro: 2005
- Plays: Right-handed (two-handed backhand)
- Prize money: $40,313

Singles
- Career record: 13–14
- Career titles: 0
- Highest ranking: No. 344 (12 May 2008)

Doubles
- Career record: 0–2
- Career titles: 0
- Highest ranking: No. 267 (15 September 2008)
- Last updated on: 23 June 2021.

Martin Pedersen (born 15 June 1987) is a former professional Danish tennis player. He played predominantly on the ATP Challenger Tour, both in doubles and singles.

Pedersen started playing professionally in 2005, and won his first Futures tournament in Norway in June 2007. He followed the win by reaching a final in yet another Norwegian Futures, as well as reaching the final of a Challenger tournament in Dublin in July. These achievements made him reach his career-best ranking of World No. 344 on 12 May 2008. He announced his retirement in early 2010.

Pedersen also played in the Denmark Davis Cup team.

== ATP Challenger and ITF Futures finals ==
=== Singles: 9 (3–6) ===
Legend ATP Challenger (0–1) ITF Futures (3–5)	Finals by surface Hard (1–4) Clay (2–1) Grass (0–0) Carpet (0–1)

Result	W–L	Date	Tournament	Tier	Surface	Opponent	Score
Win	1–0	Jun 2007	Norway F1, Gausdal	Futures	Hard	(Norway) Erling Tveit	6–3, 6–1
Loss	1–1	Jun 2007	Norway F2, Gausdal	Futures	Hard	(Denmark) Rasmus Nørby	3–6, 6–4, 6–7^{(5–7)}
Loss	1–2	Jul 2007	Dublin, Ireland	Challenger	Carpet	(India) Rohan Bopanna	4–6, 3–6
Loss	1–3	Mar 2008	Great Britain F5, St Peter	Futures	Hard	(Poland) Dawid Olejniczak	2–6, 3–6
Win	2–3	Aug 2008	Belgium F3, Brussels	Futures	Clay	(Belgium) Jeroen Masson	7–5, 7–6^{(7–5)}
Loss	2–4	Oct 2008	USA F25, Laguna Niguel	Futures	Hard	(United States) Lester Cook	2–6, 2–6
Loss	2–5	Apr 2009	Turkey F4, Antalya	Futures	Hard	(Turkey) Marsel İlhan	3–6, 2–6
Loss	2–6	Aug 2013	Denmark F3, Copenhagen	Futures	Clay	(Sweden) Markus Eriksson	4–6, 5–7
Win	3–6	Aug 2014	Denmark F2, Copenhagen	Futures	Clay	(Sweden) Patrik Rosenholm	4–6, 7–6^{(7–4)}, 6–3

=== Doubles: 11 (5–6) ===
Legend ATP Challenger (0–2) ITF Futures (5–4)	Finals by surface Hard (3–2) Clay (1–4) Grass (0–0) Carpet (1–0)

Result	W–L	Date	Tournament	Tier	Surface	Partner	Opponents	Score
Loss	0–1	Jun 2006	Romania F5, Zalău	Futures	Clay	(Denmark) Jacob Melskens	(Romania) Adrian Barbu (Romania) Florin Mergea	2–6, 3–6
Win	1–1	Nov 2006	Tunisia F4, Sfax	Futures	Hard	(Denmark) Rasmus Nørby	(Denmark) Jacob Melskens (Russia) Dmitri Sitak	6–7^{(5–7)}, 6–4, 6–2
Win	2–1	Jan 2007	Great Britain F1, Sheffield	Futures	Hard	(Denmark) Rasmus Nørby	(Finland) Juho Paukku (Slovakia) Kamil Čapkovič	6–3, 7–6^{(8–6)}
Win	3–1	Mar 2007	Italy F6, Catania	Futures	Clay	(Denmark) Frederik Nielsen	(Greece) Alexandros Jakupovic (Czech Republic) Dušan Karol	6–4, 7–5
Loss	3–2	May 2007	Romania F1, Bucharest	Futures	Clay	(Denmark) Thomas Kromann	(Belgium) Niels Desein (Belgium) Jeroen Masson	4–6, 1–6
Win	4–2	Jul 2007	Ireland F2, Limerick	Futures	Carpet	(Denmark) Rasmus Nørby	(Italy) Riccardo Ghedin (Italy) Uros Vico	7–6^{(7–3)}, 6–4
Loss	4–3	Sep 2007	Grenoble, France	Challenger	Hard	(Denmark) Frederik Nielsen	(Netherlands) Jasper Smit (Netherlands) Martijn van Haasteren	3–6, 1–6
Loss	4–4	Nov 2007	Great Britain F22, Sunderland	Futures	Hard	(United Kingdom) Neil Bamford	(Belarus) Andrei Karatchenia (Belarus) Vladimir Voltchkov	6–2, 2–6, [8–10]
Loss	4–5	May 2008	Aarhus, Denmark	Challenger	Clay	(Denmark) Frederik Nielsen	(Poland) Dawid Olejniczak (Netherlands Antilles) Jean-Julien Rojer	6–7^{(4–7)}, 6–2, [8–10]
Loss	4–6	Aug 2008	Germany F16, Wahlstedt	Futures	Clay	(Germany) Julian Reister	(Germany) Sebastian Rieschick (Russia) Dmitri Sitak	5–7, 1–6
Win	5–6	Apr 2009	Turkey F5, Antalya	Futures	Hard	(Germany) Sebastian Rieschick	(Netherlands) Antal van der Duim (Netherlands) Thomas Schoorel	7–5, 6–3
