= Jacob Adaktusson =

Swedish tennis player

- Country (sports): Sweden
- Born: 31 August 1980 (age 44); Stockholm, Sweden
- Height: 1.93 m (6 ft 4 in)
- Plays: Right-handed
- Prize money: $127,480

Singles
- Career record: 0–1
- Career titles: 0
- Highest ranking: No. 214 (March 6, 2006)

Grand Slam singles results
- Australian Open: 1R (2006)
- French Open: Q1 (2005)
- Wimbledon: Q2 (2005)
- US Open: Q1 (2004, 2005, 2006)

Doubles
- Career record: 0–2
- Career titles: 0
- Highest ranking: No. 263 (August 21, 2006)

Jacob Adaktusson (born 31 August 1980) is a professional tennis player from Sweden.

== Tennis career ==
The greatest achievement of Adaktusson's career is qualifying for the main draw of the 2006 Australian Open. He played veteran Davide Sanguinetti in the first round and lost in straight sets.

Adaktusson plays mainly on the Challenger circuit, where he has been a runner-up four times, twice in singles and two more times in the doubles. It is as a doubles player that he has competed in his two ATP Tour tournaments, with Joachim Johansson at Stockholm in 2000 and partnering Johan Landsberg at the 2007 Swedish Open. He and his partner exited in the opening round of both events.

He made a comeback on the tour in September 2012 after several years out of the game and is as of January 2013 playing on the ITF Men's Circuit.

== ITF Futures titles ==
=== Singles: 6 ===
No.	Date	Tournament	Tier	Surface	Opponent	Score
1.	Oct 2003	Jamaica F12, Montego Bay	Futures	Hard	(Paraguay) Francisco Rodríguez	6–4, 4–6, 6–1
2.	Jun 2003	Netherlands Antillies F1, Curaçao	Futures	Hard	(Netherlands) Steven Korteling	6–2, 6–1
3.	Feb 2004	Canada F1, Calgary	Futures	Hard	(Germany) Simon Greul	6–4, 6–4
4.	Sep 2004	Sweden F1, Gothenburg	Futures	Hard	(Denmark) Frederik Nielsen	5–7, 6–2, 6–1
5.	Jul 2005	Germany F8, Düsseldorf	Futures	Clay	(Germany) Julian Reister	6–3, 4–6, 7–6^{(7–5)}
6.	Oct 2013	Sweden F7, Jönköping	Futures	Hard	(Sweden) Markus Eriksson	6–2, 7–6^{(11–9)}

=== Doubles: 4 ===
No.	Date	Tournament	Tier	Surface	Partner	Opponents	Score
1.	Sep 2003	Jamaica F8, Montego Bay	Futures	Hard	(Chile) Juan Ignacio Cerda	(United States) Andrew Carlson (United States) Trevor Spracklin	6–4, 6–3
2.	Jan 2014	Germany F1, Schwieberdingen	Futures	Carpet	(Bulgaria) Dimitar Kutrovsky	(Poland) Błażej Koniusz (Poland) Mateusz Kowalczyk	6–3, 1–6, [10–6]
3.	May 2014	Sweden F1, Karlskrona	Futures	Clay	(Sweden) Robin Olin	(Germany) Leon Schutt (Poland) Maciej Smola	6–3, 4–6, [10–5]
4.	Aug 2014	Finland F1, Helsinki	Futures	Clay	(Sweden) Jesper Brunström	(Italy) Giorgio Portaluri (Sweden) Lucas Renard	7–6^{(9–7)}, 6–2
