= John McGahon =

Irish former politician (born 1990)

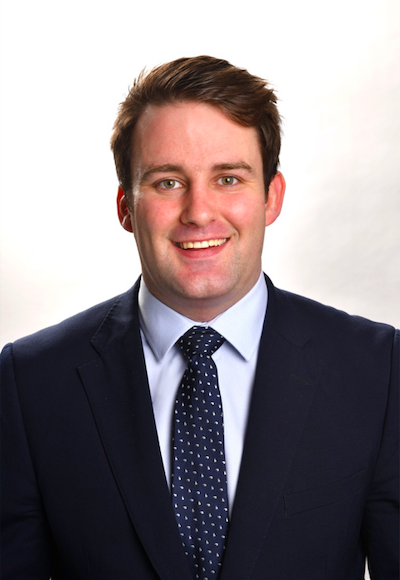
- McGahon in 2022

Senator
- In office 29 June 2020 – 30 January 2025
- Constituency: Cultural and Educational Panel

Personal details
- Born: 20 November 1990 (age 35) Dundalk, County Louth, Ireland
- Party: Fine Gael
- Relatives: Brendan McGahon (uncle)
- Education: University College Dublin

John McGahon (born 20 November 1990) is an Irish former Fine Gael politician who served as a senator for the Cultural and Educational Panel from 2020 until 2025.

== Early life and career ==
McGahon is from Dundalk, County Louth, and attended Dundalk Grammar School. He obtained a BA in history and politics from University College Dublin. His father, Johnny McGahon, was a member of Dundalk town council from 1994 to 2004. His uncle Brendan McGahon was a TD for Louth from 1982 to 2002.

== Louth County Council ==
John McGahon was first elected to Louth County Council for the Dundalk–Carlingford local electoral area in 2014, retaining his seat in 2019. He was elected as chairperson of the Dundalk Municipal District on two separate occasions, 2017–2018 and 2019–2020.

== General elections ==
He stood unsuccessfully for the Louth constituency at the 2020 general election, and was also unsuccessful at the 2024 general election.

== Seanad Éireann ==
On 31 March 2020, McGahon was elected to the Seanad following the 2020 Seanad election. In June 2020, he was appointed as the Fine Gael Seanad spokesperson on Environment, Climate and Communications, and is on the joint Oireachtas committee on climate action, and the committee on the implementation of the Good Friday Agreement.

He did not contest the 2025 Seanad election.

== Assault allegations ==
While awaiting trial for an alleged assault in his home town of Dundalk, dating to June 2018, McGahon was asked by Fine Gael not to stand in the 2020 general election but ran anyway. In an interview with LMFM in October 2018, he admitted that he had been involved in a fight and that he had a long-standing problem with alcohol.

On 24 May 2022, McGahon went on trial, accused of assault. On 27 May 2022, he was found not guilty In July 2024, in a civil action in the High Court, a jury ordered McGahon to pay €39,000 over the assault in June 2018.
