= Alun Jones (tennis) =

Australian tennis player

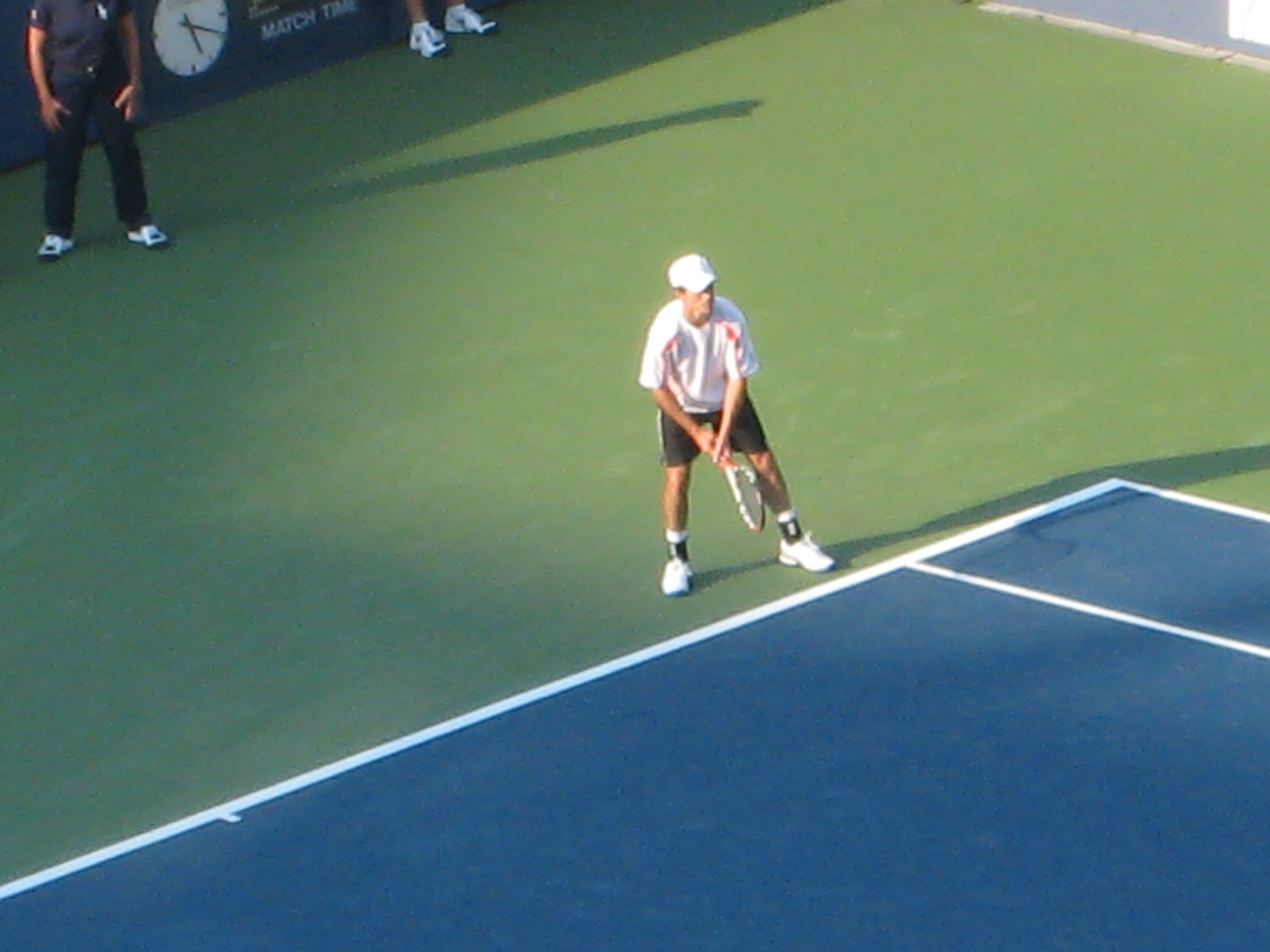
- Alun Jones at the 2007 US Open
- Country (sports): Australia
- Born: 26 April 1980 (age 46) Boksburg, South Africa
- Turned pro: 2000
- Plays: Right-handed, Two-handed Backhand
- Prize money: $298,154

Singles
- Career record: 4–9
- Career titles: 0
- Highest ranking: No. 123 (13 August 2007)

Grand Slam singles results
- Australian Open: 2R (2008)
- French Open: Q1 (2007)
- Wimbledon: Q1 (2007, 2008)
- US Open: 1R (2007)

Doubles
- Career record: 4–6
- Highest ranking: No. 149 (28 April 2003)

Grand Slam doubles results
- Australian Open: 3R (2003)
- Wimbledon: Q1 (2008)

Alun Jones (born 26 April 1980) is a retired Australian professional tennis player.

Jones started playing tennis at age 7. His parents are David, a civil engineer, and Susan. Jones. Jones also likes playing rugby, soccer, basketball and cricket. Alun played the role of Tom Cavendish in the 2004 movie Wimbledon.

== Summer of 2007 ==
During the summer of 2007, Jones obtained a 20–4 record at several Challenger tournaments and one Futures tournament. This took his world ranking from 198 to a career high of 123. He was granted a wildcard to the 2007 US Open under a reciprocal agreement with Australian Open. He was eliminated in the first round, losing in four sets to second seed Rafael Nadal.

== Singles titles ==
Legend (singles)
Grand Slam (0)
Tennis Masters Cup (0)
ATP Masters Series (0)
ATP Tour (0)
Challengers (2)
Futures (9)

No.	Date	Tournament	Surface	Opponent in the final	Score
1.	19 November 2002	Berri	Grass	(Australia) Paul Baccanello	6–2, 6–2
2.	2 May 2005	Phuket	Hard	(Austria) Patrick Schmölzer	6–1, 6–1
3.	16 May 2005	Phuket	Hard	(United States) Phillip King	6–3, 6–1
4.	30 May 2005	Maspalomas	Clay	(Spain) Ignasi Villacampa	6–1, 6–2
5.	12 September 2006	Hope Island	Hard	(Australia) Robert Smeets	6–3, 7–6
6.	24 October 2006	Mildura	Grass	(Australia) Samuel Groth	3–6, 7–5, 6–4
7.	31 October 2006	Berri	Grass	(Australia) Shannon Nettle	6–4, 6–3
8.	20 March 2007	Lyneham	Clay	(Greece) Vasilis Mazarakis	3–6, 6–1, 6–3
9.	10 July 2007	Felixstowe	Grass	(France) Nicolas Tourte	6–3, 6–4
10.	23 July 2007	Nottingham	Grass	(Pakistan) Aisam-ul-Haq Qureshi	6–3, 4–6, 6–4
11.	9 December 2007	Burnie	Hard	(Australia) Rameez Junaid	6–0, 6–1
