= Jasper Smit =

Dutch tennis player

- Full name: Jasper Smit
- Country (sports): Netherlands
- Born: 17 November 1980 (age 44)
- Plays: Right-handed
- Prize money: $94,414

Singles
- Career record: 0–1
- Career titles: 0
- Highest ranking: No. 413 (8 November 2004)

Doubles
- Career record: 2–8
- Career titles: 0
- Highest ranking: No. 121 (3 March 2008)

Jasper Smit (born 17 November 1980) is a former professional tennis player from the Netherlands.

== Biography ==
Smit, a right-handed player, featured most successfully in the doubles format, in which he reached 121 in the world.

All of his eight main draw doubles appearances on the ATP Tour were with countryman Martijn van Haasteren and included two quarter-finals. The pair reached the quarter-finals at the Dutch Open Amersfoort in 2007 by upsetting second seeds Tomas Behrend and Christopher Kas, then in 2008 they were quarter-finalists at the Zagreb Indoors. He also won three Challenger titles partnering van Haasteren.

As a singles player he appeared in his only ATP Tour main draw at the 2006 Kingfisher Airlines Tennis Open in Mumbai, for a first round loss to Gouichi Motomura. He took part in the qualifying draw for the 2006 Wimbledon Championships. In 2010 he won a match over then world number 62 Pablo Cuevas on clay at the Scheveningen Challenger.

Retired from professional tennis, Smit was still playing in Dutch league tennis at the age of 36.

== Challenger titles ==
=== Doubles: (3) ===
No.	Year	Tournament	Surface	Partner	Opponents	Score
1.	2006	Dublin, Ireland	Carpet	(Netherlands) Martijn van Haasteren	(United Kingdom) Colin Fleming (United Kingdom) Jamie Murray	6–3, 2–6, [10–8]
2.	2006	Helsinki, Finland	Hard	(Netherlands) Martijn van Haasteren	(Latvia) Ernests Gulbis (Latvia) Deniss Pavlovs	7–6^{(8–6)}, 6–2
3.	2007	Grenoble, France	Hard	(Netherlands) Martijn van Haasteren	(Denmark) Frederik Nielsen (Denmark) Martin Pedersen	6–3, 6–1
