= Gary Lugassy =

French tennis player

- Full name: Gary Lugassy
- Country (sports): France
- Born: 20 August 1982 (age 43)
- Plays: Left-handed
- Prize money: $158,482

Singles
- Highest ranking: No. 194 (October 22, 2007)

Doubles
- Highest ranking: No. 340 (11 September 2006)

Gary Lugassy (born 20 August 1982) is a former professional tennis player from France.

== Biography ==
A left-handed player, Lugassy began touring professionally in 2003. During his career he regularly featured in the qualifying draws of all four Grand Slam competitions, 12 times in total, but was never able to progress into the main tournament. He won the doubles event with Alessandro Gravina at the 2006 Challenger de Granby, his only Challenger title. At the same Granby Challenger tournament in 2007 he won a match against Milos Raonic, who was making his first ever appearance at that level. His highest ranking, 194 in the world, was attained in October 2007.

== Challenger titles ==
=== Doubles: (1) ===
No.	Year	Tournament	Surface	Partner	Opponents	Score
1.	2006	Granby, Canada	Hard	(Canada) Alessandro Gravina	(Chinese Taipei) Lu Yen-hsun (Germany) Frank Moser	6–2, 7–6^{(7–2)}
