= Peter Clarke (tennis) =

Irish tennis player

- Country (sports): (Republic of Ireland) Ireland
- Born: 8 July 1979 (age 45); Dublin, Ireland
- Height: 1.88 m (6 ft 2 in)
- Turned pro: 1998
- Plays: Right-handed
- Prize money: $74,290

Singles
- Career record: 3–5
- Career titles: 0
- Highest ranking: No. 229 (21 Oct 2002)

Grand Slam singles results
- Australian Open: Q1 (1998, 1999)
- French Open: Q1 (2003)
- Wimbledon: Q2 (2003)
- US Open: Q3 (2003)

Doubles
- Career record: 1–0
- Career titles: 0
- Highest ranking: No. 883 (20 Nov 2000)

Peter Clarke (born 8 July 1979) is a former professional tennis player from Ireland.

Clarke made the round of 16 in the boys' singles event at the 1996 Australian Open.

He appeared in seven Davis Cup ties for Ireland, playing 12 rubbers, of which he won six.

The number one ranked Irish player for much of his career, Clarke played on the ITF Men's Circuit and ATP Challenger Circuit.

== Finals ==
=== Singles ===
Legend (singles)
ITF Futures Tournaments (4–4)

Outcome	No.	Date	Tournament	Surface	Opponent	Score
Runner-up	1.	11 November 2001	Beaumaris, Australia	Hard	(Australia) Scott Draper	1–6, 6–7^{(3–7)}
Runner-up	2.	18 November 2001	Frankston, Australia	Hard	(Australia) Peter Luczak	4–6, 6–1, 4–6
Winner	1.	23 June 2002	Berkeley, United States	Hard	(North Macedonia) Lazar Magdinčev	6–2, 7–6^{(7–2)}
Runner-up	3.	17 August 2002	London, Great Britain	Hard	(Luxembourg) Mike Scheidweiler	6–4, 1–6, 1–6
Winner	2.	30 March 2003	Mobile, United States	Hard	(United States) Michael Joyce	7–6^{(8–6)}, 6–4
Winner	3.	27 April 2003	Bergamo, Italy	Clay	(Italy) Andrea Stoppini	6–3, 6–4
Runner-up	4.	4 May 2003	Bournemouth, Great Britain	Clay	(Czech Republic) Tomáš Berdych	1–6, 4–6
Winner	4.	21 July 2007	Yerevan, Armenia	Hard	(Russia) Mikhail Elgin	5–7, 6–2, 6–3

=== Doubles ===
Legend (doubles)
ITF Futures Tournaments (0–1)

Outcome	No.	Date	Tournament	Surface	Partnering	Opponents	Score
Runner-up	1.	25 August 2007	Helsinki, Finland	Hard	(Australia) Raphael Durek	(United States) Ikaika Jobe (United States) Ryan Stotland	4–6, 6–3, 2–6
