= Martijn van Haasteren =

Dutch tennis player (born 1980)

- Full name: Martijn van Haasteren
- Country (sports): Netherlands (2003-2008); Netherlands Antilles (2008-2013)
- Born: 12 September 1980 (age 44); Delft
- Plays: Right-handed
- Prize money: $75,582

Singles
- Career record: 3–4
- Career titles: 0
- Highest ranking: No. 474 (6 February 2006)

Doubles
- Career record: 4–15
- Career titles: 0
- Highest ranking: No. 117 (12 February 2007)

Martijn van Haasteren (born 12 September 1980) is a Dutch former professional tennis player who competed for both the Netherlands and the Netherlands Antilles.

== Biography ==
Originally representing the Netherlands, van Haasteren played on tour mostly as a doubles specialist.

He appeared in 11 ATP Tour tournaments from 2006 to 2008, mainly with countryman Jasper Smit, with whom he made the quarter-finals of the events in Amersfoort and Zagreb. The pair also won three Challenger titles. One of those came against future world number one doubles player Jamie Murray and partner Colin Fleming, in Dublin. He reached his career best doubles ranking of 117 in 2007.

In 2008 he switched allegiance to the Netherlands Antilles, in order to play Davis Cup fixtures. He played in the Davis Cup until 2011 and also served as team captain.

As a coach he has been involved with Michel Koning, Matwe Middelkoop, Stephan Fransen, Sander Arends and David Pel.

== Challenger titles ==
=== Doubles: (3) ===
No.	Year	Tournament	Surface	Partner	Opponents	Score
1.	2006	Dublin, Ireland	Carpet	(Netherlands) Jasper Smit	(United Kingdom) Colin Fleming (United Kingdom) Jamie Murray	6–3, 2–6, [10–8]
2.	2006	Helsinki, Finland	Hard	(Netherlands) Jasper Smit	(Latvia) Ernests Gulbis (Latvia) Deniss Pavlovs	7–6^{(8–6)}, 6–2
3.	2007	Grenoble, France	Hard	(Netherlands) Jasper Smit	(Denmark) Frederik Nielsen (Denmark) Martin Pedersen	6–3, 6–1
