= Nicolas Tourte =

French tennis player

- Full name: Nicolas Tourte
- Country (sports): France
- Born: 18 August 1979 (age 45); Chambéry, France
- Plays: Right-handed (Double Handed Backhand)
- Prize money: $146,206

Singles
- Career record: 0–0
- Career titles: 0
- Highest ranking: No. 215 (7 May 2007)

Doubles
- Career record: 1–3
- Career titles: 0
- Highest ranking: No. 103 (23 July 2007)
- Current ranking: No. 1746 (29 May 2023)

Grand Slam doubles results
- French Open: 2R (2007)

Nicolas Tourte (born 18 August 1979) is a professional tennis player from France.

== Biography ==
Born in Chambéry, Tourte is a right-handed player, with a double handed backhand.

Tourte, who won three Challenger doubles titles, made the singles final of the Grenoble Challenger tournament in 2006, during which he had wins over Ernests Gulbis and Gilles Müller.

He featured in the main draw of one Grand Slam event, the 2007 French Open. Playing in the men's doubles, Tourte and partner Thomas Oger made the second round, where they lost to the eventual champions, Mark Knowles and Daniel Nestor.

In 2008 he played doubles in two tournaments on the ATP Tour, the Swedish Open and Dutch Open, with Alessandro Motti and Igor Zelenay respectively.

== Challenger titles ==
=== Doubles: (3) ===
No.	Year	Tournament	Surface	Partner	Opponents	Score
1.	2006	Bukhara, Uzbekistan	Hard	(France) Nicolas Renavand	(India) Rohan Bopanna (Pakistan) Aisam-ul-Haq Qureshi	2–6, 6–3, 10–8
2.	2006	Nottingham, Great Britain	Hard	(Sweden) Filip Prpic	(United Kingdom) Jamie Delgado (United Kingdom) Jamie Murray	6–4, 4–6, 10–7
3.	2007	Wrexham, Great Britain	Hard	(Monaco) Thomas Oger	(United Kingdom) Richard Bloomfield (Netherlands) Robin Haase	6–74, 7–5, 12–10
