= 2002 ITF Men's Circuit =

Details

Achievements (singles)

The 2002 ITF Men's Circuit was the 2002 edition of the third-tier tour for men's professional tennis. It was organised by the International Tennis Federation and is a tier below the ATP Challenger Tour. The ITF Men's Circuit included satellite events and 301 'Futures' tournaments played year round across six continents, with prize money ranging from $10,000 to $15,000.

== Futures events ==
$15,000 tournaments
$10,000 tournaments

=== January ===
Tournament	Date	City	Surface	Singles champions	Doubles champions
France F1 Futures $10,000	January 7	Grasse, France	Clay (i)	(France) Julien Varlet	(Argentina) Roberto Álvarez (France) Jordane Doble
USA F1 Futures $15,000	January 7	Aventura, United States	Hard	(Switzerland) Yves Allegro	(United States) Thomas Blake (United States) Kristian Capalik
France F2 Futures $10,000	January 14	Angers, France	Clay (i)	(Belgium) Dominique Coene	(France) Thierry Ascione (France) Stéphane Huet
USA F2 Futures $15,000	January 14	Delray Beach, United States	Hard	(Russia) Igor Kunitsyn	(United States) Graydon Oliver (United States) Travis Rettenmaier
France F3 Futures $10,000	January 21	Feucherolles, France	Clay (i)	(Spain) Óscar Hernández	(Spain) Rubén Ramírez Hidalgo (Spain) Santiago Ventura
USA F3 Futures $15,000	January 21	North Miami Beach, United States	Hard	(Peru) Iván Miranda	(United States) Graydon Oliver (United States) Travis Rettenmaier
United Arab Emirates F1 Futures $15,000	January 21	Abu Dhabi, United Arab Emirates	Hard	(Germany) Denis Gremelmayr	(Slovakia) Tomas Janci (Slovakia) Roman Kukal
France F4 Futures $15,000	January 28	Deauville, France	Clay (i)	(France) Jean-Christophe Faurel	(France) Christophe Deveaux (France) Nicolas Devilder
United Arab Emirates F2 Futures $15,000	January 28	Abu Dhabi, United Arab Emirates	Hard	(Switzerland) Marco Chiudinelli	(India) Rohan Bopanna (Chinese Taipei) Lu Yen-hsun

=== February ===
Tournament	Date	City	Surface	Singles champions	Doubles champions
Great Britain F1 Futures $15,000	February 4	Nottingham, Great Britain	Carpet (i)	(United Kingdom) Alex Bogdanovic	(Republic of Ireland) John Doran (Australia) Andrew Painter
France F5 Futures $10,000	February 4	Bressuire, France	Hard (i)	(France) Jérôme Hanquez	(Switzerland) Stéphane Bohli (France) Benjamin Cassaigne
Great Britain F2 Futures $15,000	February 11	Glasgow, Great Britain	Carpet (i)	(Luxembourg) Gilles Müller	(Switzerland) Yves Allegro (Belgium) Arnaud Fontaine
Croatia F1 Futures $15,000	February 11	Zagreb, Croatia	Hard (i)	(Croatia) Lovro Zovko	(Croatia) Roko Karanušić (Croatia) Lovro Zovko
Israel F1 Futures $10,000	February 11	Ramat HaSharon, Israel	Hard	(Chinese Taipei) Lu Yen-hsun	(Israel) Lior Dahan (Chinese Taipei) Lu Yen-hsun
Croatia F2 Futures $15,000	February 18	Zagreb, Croatia	Hard (i)	(Croatia) Lovro Zovko	(Croatia) Roko Karanušić (Croatia) Lovro Zovko
USA F4 Futures $15,000	February 18	Brownsville, United States	Hard	(United States) Brian Vahaly	(United States) Tres Davis (United States) Graydon Oliver
Israel F2 Futures $10,000	February 18	Ashkelon, Israel	Hard	(Russia) Philipp Mukhometov	(Russia) Evgueni Smirnov (Finland) Tero Vilen
New Zealand F1 Futures $10,000	February 25	Blenheim, New Zealand	Hard	(Australia) Todd Reid	(Australia) Ashley Ford (Australia) David McNamara
Israel F3 Futures $10,000	February 25	Jaffa, Israel	Hard	(France) Stéphane Robert	(Israel) Lior Dahan (United States) Jason Marshall
USA F5 Futures $15,000	February 25	Harlingen, United States	Hard	(United States) Travis Rettenmaier	(United States) Graydon Oliver (United States) Travis Rettenmaier

=== March ===
Tournament	Date	City	Surface	Singles champions	Doubles champions
New Zealand F2 Futures $10,000	March 4	Christchurch, New Zealand	Hard	(South Africa) Dirk Stegmann	(South Africa) Johan Du Randt (South Africa) Dirk Stegmann
Mexico F1 Futures $15,000	March 4	Chetumal, Mexico	Hard	(Argentina) Juan Pablo Brzezicki	(Mexico) Bruno Echagaray (Mexico) Santiago González
Sri Lanka F1 Futures $10,000	March 4	Colombo, Sri Lanka	Clay	(France) Jordane Doble	(India) Rohan Bopanna (India) Vijay Kannan
India F1 Futures $10,000	March 11	Chennai, India	Hard	(Slovakia) Branislav Sekáč	(United Kingdom) Jonathan Marray (United Kingdom) David Sherwood
New Zealand F3 Futures $10,000	March 11	North Shore City, New Zealand	Hard (i)	(Azerbaijan) Emin Ağayev	(South Africa) W.P. Meyer (South Africa) Wesley Whitehouse
France F6 Futures $15,000	March 11	Lille, France	Hard (i)	(Belgium) Kristof Vliegen	(France) Julien Benneteau (France) Nicolas Mahut
Mexico F2 Futures $15,000	March 11	Mexico City, Mexico	Hard	(Federal Republic of Yugoslavia) Janko Tipsarević	(Argentina) Sebastián Decoud (Argentina) Ignacio González King
India F2 Futures $10,000	March 18	New Delhi, India	Hard	(India) Rohan Bopanna	(India) Rohan Bopanna (India) Vijay Kannan
France F7 Futures $15,000	March 18	Poitiers, France	Hard (i)	(France) Grégory Carraz	(France) Benjamin Cassaigne (Belgium) Jeroen Masson
Mexico F3 Futures $15,000	March 18	Aguascalientes, Mexico	Clay	(Brazil) Ronaldo Carvalho	(Mexico) Bruno Echagaray (Mexico) Santiago González
USA F6 Futures $15,000	March 25	Pensacola, United States	Hard	(Croatia) Ivo Karlović	(United States) Thomas Blake (United States) Doug Bohaboy
France F8 Futures $15,000	March 25	Melun, France	Carpet (i)	(Switzerland) Roman Valent	(Poland) Mariusz Fyrstenberg (Bulgaria) Radoslav Lukaev
Australia F1 Futures $15,000	March 25	Devonport, Tasmania, Australia	Hard	(Japan) Satoshi Iwabuchi	(South Africa) Johan Du Randt (South Africa) Dirk Stegmann

=== April ===
Tournament	Date	City	Surface	Singles champions	Doubles champions
Uzbekistan F1 Futures $15,000	April 1	Qarshi, Uzbekistan	Hard	(Chinese Taipei) Jimmy Wang	(France) Rodolphe Cadart (France) Benjamin Cassaigne
USA F7 Futures $15,000	April 1	Little Rock, United States	Hard	(Germany) Florian Jeschonek	(United States) Huntley Montgomery (United States) Ryan Sachire
France F9 Futures $15,000	April 1	Saint-Brieuc, France	Clay	(France) Marc Gicquel	(Germany) Marc-Rene Burger (Germany) Andreas Spaniol
Australia F2 Futures $15,000	April 1	Burnie, Tasmania, Australia	Hard	(Australia) Jaymon Crabb	(Australia) Jaymon Crabb (Australia) Joseph Sirianni
Japan F1 Futures $10,000	April 8	Sutama, Japan	Clay	(Monaco) Thomas Oger	(France) Benoit Foucher (Monaco) Thomas Oger
USA F8 Futures $15,000	April 8	Mobile, United States	Hard	(United States) Tripp Phillips	(United States) Huntley Montgomery (United States) Tripp Phillips
Uzbekistan F2 Futures $15,000	April 8	Guliston, Uzbekistan	Hard	(Slovakia) Branislav Sekáč	(Russia) Artem Derepasko (Russia) Mikhail Elgin
Greece F1 Futures $15,000	April 8	Syros, Greece	Hard	(Switzerland) Marco Chiudinelli	(France) Thierry Ascione (France) Florent Serra
Jamaica F1 Futures $10,000	April 8	Kingston, Jamaica	Hard	(Venezuela) Kepler Orellana	(United States) Tres Davis (Canada) Philip Gubenco
Japan F2 Futures $10,000	April 15	Shirako, Japan	Carpet	(Japan) Tasuku Iwami	(United States) KC Corkery (United States) Brandon Kramer
USA F9 Futures $15,000	April 15	Elkin, United States	Hard	(United States) Andres Pedroso	(United States) Huntley Montgomery (United States) Tripp Phillips
China F1 Futures $15,000	April 15	Kunming City, China, P.R.	Hard	(Chinese Taipei) Lu Yen-hsun	(Thailand) Danai Udomchoke (Chinese Taipei) Jimmy Wang
Greece F2 Futures $15,000	April 15	Kalamata, Greece	Hard	(Slovakia) Karol Beck	(Slovakia) Karol Beck (Slovakia) Michal Mertiňák
Kuwait F1 Futures $10,000	April 15	Mishref, Kuwait	Hard	(Hungary) Kornél Bardóczky	(Spain) Esteban Carril (Germany) Walter Orth
Jamaica F2 Futures $10,000	April 15	Montego Bay, Jamaica	Hard	(Colombia) Michael Quintero	(United States) Tres Davis (Canada) Philip Gubenco
Japan F3 Futures $10,000	April 22	Takamori, Japan	Carpet	(Japan) Michihisa Onoda	(Japan) Yasuo Miyazaki (Japan) Hiroyasu Sato
Germany F1 Futures $10,000	April 22	Riemerling, Germany	Clay	(Czech Republic) Tomáš Zíb	(Germany) Sebastian Jaeger (Germany) Philipp Petzschner
Algeria F1 Futures $15,000	April 22	Sidi Fredj, Algiers, Algeria	Clay	(Czech Republic) František Čermák	(Italy) Matteo Colla (Spain) Óscar Hernández
Kuwait F2 Futures $10,000	April 22	Mishref, Kuwait	Hard	(Germany) Lars Zimmermann	(India) Mustafa Ghouse (India) Vijay Kannan
Mexico F4 Futures $10,000	April 22	Guadalajara, Mexico	Clay	(Austria) Andreas Fasching	(Brazil) Ronaldo Carvalho (Brazil) Henrique Mello
Jamaica F3 Futures $10,000	April 22	Montego Bay, Jamaica	Hard	(Luxembourg) Gilles Müller	(United States) Diego Ayala (Australia) Adam Kennedy
China F2 Futures $15,000	April 23	Kunming City, China, P.R.	Hard	(Chinese Taipei) Lu Yen-hsun	(China) Yang Jingzhu (China) Zhu Benqiang
Great Britain F3 Futures $15,000	April 29	Bournemouth, Great Britain	Clay	(France) Richard Gasquet	(Czech Republic) Jaroslav Levinský (Czech Republic) Michal Navrátil
Uzbekistan F3 Futures $15,000	April 29	Andijan, Uzbekistan	Hard	(France) Rodolphe Cadart	(Finland) Tuomas Ketola (Pakistan) Aisam-ul-Haq Qureshi
Algeria F2 Futures $15,000	April 29	Sidi Fredj, Algiers, Algeria	Clay	(Czech Republic) František Čermák	(Czech Republic) Jan Hájek (Czech Republic) Jan Mertl
Germany F2 Futures $15,000	April 29	Esslingen, Germany	Clay	(France) Olivier Mutis	(Sweden) Kalle Flygt (Sweden) Nicklas Timfjord
Kuwait F3 Futures $10,000	April 29	Mishref, Kuwait	Hard	(Spain) Esteban Carril	(Kuwait) Husain Al-Ashwak (Kuwait) Mohammad Al Foudari
Mexico F5 Futures $10,000	April 29	Aguascalientes, Mexico	Hard	(Mexico) Miguel Gallardo Valles	(Mexico) Marcello Amador (Mexico) Miguel Gallardo Valles

=== May ===
Tournament	Date	City	Surface	Singles champions	Doubles champions
Uzbekistan F4 Futures $15,000	May 6	Namangan, Uzbekistan	Hard	(Russia) Igor Kunitsyn	(South Africa) Rik de Voest (South Africa) Dirk Stegmann
USA F10 Futures $15,000	May 6	Vero Beach, United States	Clay	(Azerbaijan) Emin Ağayev	(United States) Diego Ayala (United States) Rafael de Mesa
Italy F1 Futures $10,000	May 6	Valdengo, Italy	Clay	(Argentina) Andres Dellatorre	(Germany) Christopher Kas (Japan) Jun Kato
Germany F3 Futures $15,000	May 6	Neckarau, Mannheim, Germany	Clay	(Bulgaria) Radoslav Lukaev	(Germany) Florian Jeschonek (Slovakia) Ivo Klec
Mexico F6 Futures $10,000	May 6	Obregón, Mexico	Hard	(United States) Alex Bogomolov Jr.	(United States) Zack Fleishman (United States) Trace Fielding
Jamaica F4 Futures $10,000	May 6	Montego Bay, Jamaica	Hard	(Greece) Konstantinos Economidis	(Greece) Konstantinos Economidis (Greece) Nikos Rovas
Jamaica F5 Futures $10,000	May 13	Montego Bay, Jamaica	Hard	(Venezuela) Kepler Orellana	(United States) Matt Daly (United States) Trevor Spracklin
Great Britain F4 Futures $15,000	May 13	Hatfield, Great Britain	Clay	(France) Olivier Mutis	(France) Nicolas Perrein (Luxembourg) Mike Scheidweiler
USA F11 Futures $15,000	May 13	Hallandale Beach, United States	Clay	(Australia) Todd Reid	(Argentina) Ignacio González King (Brazil) Ricardo Schlachter
Italy F2 Futures $10,000	May 13	Pavia, Italy	Clay	(Argentina) Diego Moyano	(Italy) Francesco Aldi (Italy) Giancarlo Petrazzuolo
Korea F1 Futures $15,000	May 13	Cheongju, Korea, Rep.	Clay	(South Korea) Chung Hee-seok	(South Korea) Im Sung-ho (South Korea) Kwon Oh-hee
Poland F1 Futures $10,000	May 13	Wrocław, Poland	Clay	(Germany) Alex Rădulescu	(Finland) Lauri Kiiski (Finland) Tero Vilen
Mexico F7 Futures $10,000	May 13	Loreto, Mexico	Hard	(Brazil) Bruno Soares	(United States) Alex Bogomolov Jr. (United States) Trace Fielding
Germany F4 Futures $10,000	May 14	Neheim-Husten, Arnsberg, Germany	Clay	(France) Richard Gasquet	(Germany) Denis Gremelmayr (Sweden) Fredrik Lovén
Japan F4 Futures $15,000	May 20	Fukuoka, Japan	Hard	(Japan) Gouichi Motomura	(Hong Kong) John Hui (Chinese Taipei) Lu Yen-hsun
USA F12 Futures $15,000	May 20	Tampa, United States	Clay	(Venezuela) José de Armas	(United States) Thomas Blake (United States) Levar Harper-Griffith
Italy F3 Futures $10,000	May 20	Verona, Italy	Clay	(Italy) Gianluca Luddi	(Italy) Elia Grossi (Italy) Stefano Tarallo
Korea F2 Futures $15,000	May 20	Cheongju, Korea, Rep.	Clay	(Austria) Philipp Müllner	(South Korea) Im Sung-ho (South Korea) Kwon Oh-hee
Mexico F8 Futures $10,000	May 20	Los Cabos, Mexico	Hard	(United States) Alex Bogomolov Jr.	(Argentina) Carlos Berlocq (Brazil) Bruno Soares
Poland F2 Futures $10,000	May 20	Katowice, Poland	Clay	(Romania) Adrian Cruciat	(Poland) Bartłomiej Dąbrowski (Poland) Mariusz Fyrstenberg
Czech Republic F1 Futures $10,000	May 20	Most, Czech Republic	Clay	(Czech Republic) František Čermák	(Czech Republic) Jan Masik (Czech Republic) Radovan Světlík
Jamaica F6 Futures $10,000	May 20	Montego Bay, Jamaica	Hard	(Greece) Konstantinos Economidis	(United Kingdom) Jonathan Marray (United Kingdom) David Sherwood
Morocco F1 Futures $10,000	May 20	Rabat, Morocco	Clay	(Czech Republic) Pavel Šnobel	(Czech Republic) Pavel Šnobel (Egypt) Marwan Ziwar
Germany F6 Futures $10,000	May 27	Oberweier, Friesenheim, Germany	Clay	(Belgium) Kristof Vliegen	(Germany) Frank Moser (Germany) Martin Woisetschlager
Japan F5 Futures $15,000	May 27	Fukuoka, Japan	Hard	(Japan) Gouichi Motomura	(Japan) Hiroki Kondo (Chinese Taipei) Lu Yen-hsun
Poland F3 Futures $10,000	May 27	Szczecin, Poland	Clay	(Sweden) Joachim Johansson	(Norway) Stian Boretti (Finland) Lauri Kiiski
Mexico F9 Futures $10,000	May 27	Ixtapa Zihuatanejo, Mexico	Hard	(Mexico) Miguel Gallardo Valles	(Mexico) Bruno Echagaray (Mexico) Santiago González
Czech Republic F2 Futures $10,000	May 27	Jablonec nad Nisou, Czech Republic	Clay	(France) Régis Lavergne	(Czech Republic) Ladislav Chramosta (Czech Republic) Daniel Lustig
Morocco F2 Futures $10,000	May 27	Marrakesh, Morocco	Clay	(Spain) Santiago Ventura	(Japan) Jun Kato (Luxembourg) Mike Scheidweiler

=== June ===
Tournament	Date	City	Surface	Singles champions	Doubles champions
Morocco F3 Futures $10,000	June 3	Agadir, Morocco	Clay	(Spain) Santiago Ventura	(Japan) Jun Kato (Luxembourg) Mike Scheidweiler
Czech Republic F3 Futures $10,000	June 3	Karlovy Vary, Czech Republic	Clay	(Slovakia) Michal Mertiňák	(Czech Republic) Jakub Hasek (Czech Republic) Josef Neštický
Poland F4 Futures $10,000	June 3	Poznań, Poland	Clay	(Poland) Bartłomiej Dąbrowski	(Poland) Marcin Golab (Poland) Kamil Lewandowicz
Mexico F10 Futures $10,000	June 3	Bahias de Huatulco, Mexico	Hard	(Argentina) Carlos Berlocq	
USA F13 Futures $15,000	June 3	Fresno, United States	Hard	(United States) Robert Kendrick	(United States) Nick Rainey (United States) Brian Wilson
Slovenia F1 Futures $10,000	June 3	Maribor, Slovenia	Clay	(Slovenia) Marko Tkalec	(Croatia) Ivan Cinkus (Slovenia) Andrej Kračman
Spain F1 Futures $10,000	June 3	Canary Islands, Spain	Hard	(Spain) Fernando Verdasco	(Spain) Jesus Manteca (Spain) Fernando Verdasco
Jamaica F7 Futures $10,000	June 3	Montego Bay, Jamaica	Hard	(United States) Bo Hodge	(Jamaica) Ryan Russell (Canada) Stephan Timu
Jamaica F8 Futures $10,000	June 10	New Kingston, Jamaica	Hard	(Argentina) Matías Boeker	(Argentina) Nicolas Boeker (United States) Travis Parrott
Spain F2 Futures $10,000	June 10	Canary Islands, Spain	Clay	(Spain) Marc Fornell Mestres	(Spain) Jesus Manteca (Spain) Fernando Verdasco
Germany F7 Futures $15,000	June 10	Trier, Germany	Clay	(Algeria) Slimane Saoudi	(Portugal) Bernardo Mota (Argentina) Diego Moyano
Canada F1 Futures $10,000	June 10	Mississauga, Ontario, Canada	Hard	(United States) Trace Fielding	(Canada) Simon Larose (Australia) Luke Smith
Slovenia F2 Futures $10,000	June 10	Maribor, Slovenia	Clay	(Italy) Tomas Tenconi	(Croatia) Ivan Cinkus (Slovenia) Andrej Kračman
USA F14 Futures $15,000	June 10	Sunnyvale, United States	Hard	(United States) John Paul Fruttero	(Australia) Luke Bourgeois (Australia) Alun Jones
Mexico F11 Futures $10,000	June 10	Cancún, Mexico	Hard	(United States) Alex Bogomolov Jr.	(Argentina) Sebastián Decoud (Cuba) Lázaro Navarro
Finland F1 Futures $15,000	June 10	Savitaipale, Finland	Clay	(Germany) Simon Greul	(Germany) Simon Greul (Russia) Dmitry Vlasov
Poland F5 Futures $10,000	June 10	Gdynia, Poland	Clay	(Czech Republic) Jan Hájek	(Poland) Bartłomiej Dąbrowski (Poland) Michał Przysiężny
Colombia F1 Futures $15,000	June 10	Santa Fe, Bogotá, Colombia	Clay	(Colombia) Pablo González	(Brazil) Eduardo Bohrer (Brazil) Ricardo Schlachter
Colombia F2 Futures $15,000	June 17	Santa Fe, Bogotá, Colombia	Clay	(Brazil) Eduardo Bohrer	(Colombia) Alejandro Falla (Colombia) Carlos Salamanca
Finland F2 Futures $15,000	June 17	Vierumäki, Finland	Clay	(Russia) Igor Andreev	(Finland) Tapio Nurminen (Finland) Janne Ojala
Rwanda F1 Futures $10,000	June 17	Kigali, Rwanda	Clay	(France) Gwenael Gueit	(Zimbabwe) Genius Chidzikwe (South Africa) Johan Du Randt
Slovenia F3 Futures $10,000	June 17	Kranj, Slovenia	Clay	(Croatia) Ivan Cinkus	(Croatia) Ivan Cinkus (Slovenia) Andrej Kračman
USA F15 Futures $15,000	June 17	Berkeley, United States	Hard	(Republic of Ireland) Peter Clarke	(United States) Nick Rainey (United States) Brian Wilson
Canada F2 Futures $10,000	June 17	Montreal, Canada	Hard	(Canada) Simon Larose	(Canada) Nicolas Brochu (Canada) Michal Ciszek
France F10 Futures $15,000	June 17	Blois, France	Clay	(France) Jérôme Hanquez	(Monaco) Thomas Oger (France) Xavier Pujo
Germany F8 Futures $15,000	June 17	Kassel, Germany	Clay	(Luxembourg) Mike Scheidweiler	(Kazakhstan) Alexey Kedryuk (Uzbekistan) Dmitri Tomashevich
Spain F3 Futures $15,000	June 17	Canary Islands, Spain	Hard	(Spain) Tati Rascón	(Japan) Kentaro Masuda (Japan) Norikazu Sugiyama
Jamaica F9 Futures $10,000	June 17	Montego Bay, Jamaica	Hard	(Argentina) Matías Boeker	(Germany) Konstantin Harle Zettler (Republic of Ireland) Kevin Sorensen
Chile F1 Futures $10,000	June 17	Santiago, Chile	Clay	(Argentina) Cristian Villagrán	(Argentina) Carlos Berlocq (Argentina) Lionel Noviski
Chile F2 Futures $10,000	June 24	Viña del Mar, Chile	Clay	(Argentina) Carlos Berlocq	(Chile) Sergio Elias (Argentina) Sebastian Uriarte
Slovakia F1A Futures $15,000	June 24	Košice, Slovakia	Clay	(Czech Republic) Michal Navrátil	(Slovakia) Ján Krošlák (Slovakia) Branislav Sekáč
USA F17 Futures $10,000	June 24	Williamsville, United States	Clay	(Argentina) Ignacio González King	(Paraguay) Francisco Rodríguez (United States) Nenad Toroman
Canada F3 Futures $10,000	June 24	Lachine, Quebec, Canada	Hard	(Australia) Michael Tebbutt	(India) Mustafa Ghouse (Indonesia) Peter Handoyo
Spain F4 Futures $10,000	June 24	Canary Islands, Spain	Hard	(Greece) Nikos Rovas	(Spain) Esteban Carril (Australia) Mark Kovacs
France F11 Futures $15,000	June 24	Toulon, France	Clay	(Bulgaria) Orlin Stanoytchev	(France) Sylvain Charrier (France) John Thivolle
USA F16 Futures $15,000	June 24	Auburn, United States	Hard	(United States) Mashiska Washington	(United States) Nick Rainey (United States) Brian Wilson
Rwanda F2 Futures $10,000	June 24	Kigali, Rwanda	Clay	(Czech Republic) Jakub Hasek	(United Kingdom) Richard Bloomfield (Sweden) Robert Gustafsson
Portugal F1 Futures $10,000	June 24	Lisbon, Portugal	Clay	(Belgium) Jeroen Masson	(Netherlands) Fred Hemmes (Netherlands) Jasper Smit
Venezuela F1 Futures $15,000	June 24	Barquisimeto, Venezuela	Hard	(Venezuela) José de Armas	(United States) Brandon Hawk (United States) Jason Marshall

=== July ===
Tournament	Date	City	Surface	Singles champions	Doubles champions
Venezuela F2 Futures $15,000	July 1	Maracaibo, Venezuela	Hard	(Venezuela) José de Armas	(Brazil) Fernando Araújo (Brazil) Eduardo Bohrer
Kenya F1 Futures $10,000	July 1	Mombasa, Kenya	Hard	(Tunisia) Walid Jallali	(Zimbabwe) Genius Chidzikwe (South Africa) Johan Du Randt
Portugal F2 Futures $10,000	July 1	Lisbon, Portugal	Clay	(Sweden) Robert Lindstedt	(Germany) Frank Moser (Belgium) Jeroen Masson
USA F18 Futures $10,000	July 1	Pittsburgh, United States	Clay	(Argentina) Luciano Vitullo	(United States) Andrew Colombo (Egypt) Tamer El-Sawy
Slovakia F1 Futures $15,000	July 1	Bratislava, Slovakia	Clay	(Austria) Wolfgang Schranz	(Slovakia) Juraj Hasko (Slovakia) Igor Zelenay
Romania F1 Futures $10,000	July 1	Bucharest, Romania	Clay	(Russia) Igor Andreev	(Slovakia) Tomas Janci (Slovakia) Roman Kukal
Chile F3 Futures $10,000	July 1	Santiago, Chile	Clay	(Argentina) Carlos Berlocq	(Chile) Miguel Miranda (Argentina) Sebastian Uriarte
France F12 Futures $15,000	July 8	Bourg-en-Bresse, France	Clay	(France) Régis Lavergne	(France) Guillaume Legat (France) Trystan Meniane
USA F19 Futures $10,000	July 8	Peoria, United States	Clay	(Argentina) Ignacio González King	(United States) KC Corkery (South Africa) Dirk Stegmann
Spain F5 Futures $15,000	July 8	Alicante, Spain	Clay	(Spain) Rafael Nadal	(Spain) Óscar Hernández (Spain) Gabriel Trujillo Soler
Slovakia F2 Futures $10,000	July 8	Prievidza, Slovakia	Clay	(Germany) Daniel Lesske	(Czech Republic) Igor Brukner (Czech Republic) Jan Hájek
Portugal F3 Futures $10,000	July 9	Lisbon, Portugal	Clay	(Spain) Sergi Arumi	(Czech Republic) Michal Kokta (Czech Republic) Dušan Karol
Romania F2 Futures $10,000	July 9	Bucharest, Romania	Clay	(Romania) Răzvan Sabău	(Argentina) Diego Álvare (Russia) Ivan Syrov
Spain F6 Futures $15,000	July 15	Elche, Spain	Clay	(Spain) Ivan Esquerdo	(Morocco) Mounir El Aarej (Italy) Manuel Jorquera
Germany F9 Futures $15,000	July 15	Zell, Germany	Clay	(Algeria) Slimane Saoudi	(Netherlands) Marco Marzolla (Netherlands) Raoul Snijders
USA F20 Futures $15,000	July 15	Joplin, United States	Hard	(Japan) Takahiro Terachi	(United States) Huntley Montgomery (United States) Ryan Sachire
France F13 Futures $10,000	July 15	Aix-En-Provence, France	Clay	(France) Julien Maigret	(Chile) Luis Hormazábal (Argentina) Diego Junqueira
Turkey F1 Futures $10,000	July 15	Istanbul (Enka), Turkey	Hard	(Belgium) Jeroen Masson	(Italy) Fabio Colangelo (Italy) Christian Persico
Slovakia F3 Futures $10,000	July 15	Nové Zámky, Slovakia	Clay	(Czech Republic) Jan Hájek	(Czech Republic) Igor Brukner (Czech Republic) Jan Hájek
Romania F3 Futures $10,000	July 15	Brașov, Romania	Clay	(United Kingdom) Miles Maclagan	(Romania) Victor Ioniță (Romania) Gabriel Moraru
Jamaica F10 Futures $10,000	July 15	Montego Bay, Jamaica	Hard	(United States) Brandon Wagner	(Indonesia) Peter Handoyo (Japan) Hiroki Kondo
Jamaica F11 Futures $10,000	July 22	Montego Bay, Jamaica	Hard	(United States) Brandon Wagner	(South Africa) Roger Anderson (Slovenia) Luka Gregorc
Denmark F1 Futures $15,000	July 22	Copenhagen, Denmark	Clay	(France) Édouard Roger-Vasselin	(Netherlands) Bart De Gier (Netherlands) Alexander Nonnekes
Germany F10 Futures $10,000	July 22	Leun, Germany	Clay	(Belarus) Vitali Chvets	(United States) Diego Ayala (United States) Hamid Mirzadeh
Egypt F1 Futures $10,000	July 22	Dokki, Egypt	Clay	(France) Julien Jeanpierre	(Egypt) Karim Maamoun (Egypt) Mohamed Mamoun
Turkey F2 Futures $10,000	July 22	Istanbul (Ted), Turkey	Hard	(Bulgaria) Ivaylo Traykov	(South Africa) Heinrich Heyl (Belgium) Jeroen Masson
France F14 Futures $10,000	July 22	Valescure, France	Hard	(France) Nicolas Devilder	(France) Nicolas Devilder (France) Jean-Christophe Faurel
Spain F7 Futures $10,000	July 22	Gandia, Spain	Clay	(Morocco) Mounir El Aarej	(Spain) Ivan Esquerdo (Spain) Daniel Monedero
USA F21 Futures $15,000	July 22	St Joseph, United States	Hard	(United States) Ryan Sachire	(United States) Chris Magyary (United States) Mirko Pehar
Spain F8 Futures $10,000	July 29	Dénia, Spain	Clay	(Spain) Roberto Menéndez	(France) Julien Cuaz (Netherlands) Jasper Smit
Estonia F1 Futures $10,000	July 29	Pärnu, Estonia	Clay	(Netherlands) Sander Hommel	(Estonia) Mait Künnap (Finland) Tapio Nurminen
Turkey F3 Futures $10,000	July 29	Istanbul, Turkey	Hard	(Belgium) Jeroen Masson	(South Africa) Heinrich Heyl (Belgium) Jeroen Masson
USA F22 Futures $15,000	July 29	Decatur, United States	Hard	(United States) Phillip King	(United States) John Paul Fruttero (United States) Bobby Reynolds
Austria F3 Futures $15,000	July 29	Kramsach, Austria	Clay	(Austria) Herbert Wiltschnig	(Croatia) Ivan Cinkus (Croatia) Krešimir Ritz
Denmark F2 Futures $15,000	July 29	Rungsted, Denmark	Clay	(Australia) Paul Baccanello	(Czech Republic) David Novak (Czech Republic) Martin Vacek
Egypt F2 Futures $10,000	July 29	Giza, Egypt	Clay	(United Kingdom) Miles Maclagan	(Slovakia) Tomas Janci (Slovakia) Michal Varsanyi
Jamaica F12 Futures $10,000	July 29	Montego Bay, Jamaica	Hard	(Indonesia) Peter Handoyo	(United States) Travis Parrott (United States) Trevor Spracklin
Korea F3 Futures $15,000	July 29	Seogwipo, Korea, Rep.	Hard	(Japan) Tasuku Iwami	(South Korea) Im Kyu-tae (Indonesia) Suwandi

=== August ===
Tournament	Date	City	Surface	Singles champions	Doubles champions
Korea F4 Futures $15,000	August 5	Seogwipo, Korea, Rep.	Hard	(South Korea) Kwon Oh-hee	(South Korea) Chung Hee-sung (South Korea) Chung Hee-seok
Egypt F3 Futures $10,000	August 5	Maadi, Egypt	Clay	(France) Julien Jeanpierre	(Slovakia) Tomas Janci (Slovakia) Michal Varsanyi
Austria F4 Futures $15,000	August 5	Seefeld, Austria	Clay	(Sweden) Joachim Johansson	(Slovakia) Michal Mertiňák (Slovakia) David Sebok
Great Britain F5 Futures $15,000	August 5	Bath, Great Britain	Hard	(United Kingdom) Mark Hilton	(Australia) Andrew Derer (Australia) Luke Smith
Latvia F1 Futures $10,000	August 5	Jūrmala, Latvia	Clay	(Finland) Timo Nieminen	(Federal Republic of Yugoslavia) Aleksandar Jerinkic (Australia) Steven Randjelovic
Spain F9 Futures $10,000	August 5	Xàtiva, Spain	Clay	(France) Olivier Ramos	(Spain) Daniel Gimeno Traver (Spain) Borja Uribe
USA F23 Futures $15,000	August 5	Godfrey, United States	Hard	(Japan) Takahiro Terachi	(United States) Brandon Kramer (Australia) Morgan Wilson
USA F24 Futures $15,000	August 12	Kenosha, United States	Hard	(Argentina) Ignacio Hirigoyen	(United States) Michael Kosta (South Africa) Raven Klaasen
Lithuania F1 Futures $10,000	August 12	Vilnius, Lithuania	Clay	(Finland) Janne Ojala	(Poland) Tomasz Bednarek (Poland) Michał Gawłowski
Spain F10 Futures $15,000	August 12	Vigo, Spain	Clay	(Spain) Rafael Nadal	(Spain) Marc Fornell Mestres (Spain) Ferran Ventura-Martell
Great Britain F6 Futures $15,000	August 12	London, Great Britain	Hard	(Luxembourg) Mike Scheidweiler	(United States) KC Corkery (United Kingdom) Oliver Freelove
Slovakia F4 Futures $10,000	August 12	Žilina, Slovakia	Clay	(Czech Republic) Jan Hájek	(Czech Republic) Michal Kokta (Czech Republic) Martin Štěpánek
Brazil F1 Futures $10,000	August 12	São Paulo, Brazil	Clay	(Argentina) Andres Dellatorre	(Brazil) Pedro Braga (Brazil) Alessandro Guevara
Nigeria F1 Futures $15,000	August 12	Lagos, Nigeria	Hard	(United Kingdom) Justin Layne	(Czech Republic) Jakub Hasek (Czech Republic) Josef Neštický
Russia F1 Futures $15,000	August 12	Balashikha, Russia	Clay	(Russia) Igor Andreev	(Russia) Mikhail Elgin (Russia) Dmitry Vlasov
Russia F2 Futures $15,000	August 19	Saransk, Russia	Clay	(Romania) Artemon Apostu-Efremov	(Russia) Teymuraz Gabashvili (Russia) Alexander Pavlioutchenkov
Nigeria F2 Futures $15,000	August 19	Lagos, Nigeria	Hard	(South Africa) Johan Du Randt	(Tanzania) Ronald Rugimbana (Zimbabwe) Gwinyai Tongoona
Brazil F2 Futures $15,000	August 19	Goiânia, Brazil	Hard	(Luxembourg) Gilles Müller	(Brazil) Marcelo Melo (Brazil) Bruno Soares
Slovakia F5 Futures $10,000	August 19	Ružomberok, Slovakia	Clay	(Czech Republic) Tomas Jecminek	(Czech Republic) David Miketa (Czech Republic) Martin Štěpánek
China F3 Futures $15,000	August 19	Ningbo, China, P.R.	Hard	(China) Zhu Benqiang	(China) Xu Ran (China) Zeng Shaoxuan
Netherlands F1 Futures $15,000	August 19	Enschede, Netherlands	Clay	(Germany) Philipp Kohlschreiber	(Japan) Jun Kato (Luxembourg) Mike Scheidweiler
Spain F11 Futures $15,000	August 19	Irun, Spain	Clay	(Romania) Adrian Cruciat	(Spain) Marc Fornell Mestres (Spain) Ferran Ventura-Martell
Poland F6 Futures $10,000	August 19	Poznań, Poland	Clay	(Sweden) Robert Lindstedt	(Poland) Marcin Golab (Poland) Kamil Lewandowicz
Mexico F12 Futures $10,000	August 19	Tuxtla Gutiérrez, Mexico	Hard	(Mexico) Víctor Romero	(Venezuela) Kepler Orellana (Japan) Hiroki Kondo
India F3 Futures $10,000	August 19	Delhi, India	Hard	(India) Sunil-Kumar Sipaeya	(India) Harsh Mankad (India) Ajay Ramaswami
India F4 Futures $10,000	August 26	Gulbarga, India	Hard	(Slovakia) Viktor Bruthans	(India) Harsh Mankad (India) Ajay Ramaswami
Mexico F13 Futures $10,000	August 26	Celaya, Mexico	Clay	(Mexico) Santiago González	(Mexico) Bruno Echagaray (Mexico) Santiago González
Poland F7 Futures $10,000	August 26	Łódź, Poland	Clay	(Sweden) Robert Lindstedt	(Poland) Marcin Golab (Poland) Marcin Matkowski
Netherlands F2 Futures $15,000	August 26	Alphen aan den Rijn, Netherlands	Clay	(Spain) Óscar Hernández	(Spain) Óscar Hernández (Argentina) Gustavo Marcaccio
Spain F12 Futures $15,000	August 26	Santander, Spain	Clay	(Spain) Mariano Albert-Ferrando	(Australia) Paul Baccanello (Spain) Diego Hipperdinger
China F4 Futures $15,000	August 26	Taizhou, China, P.R.	Hard	(United States) Brandon Hawk	(United States) Brandon Hawk (Indonesia) Suwandi
Morocco F4 Futures $10,000	August 26	Casablanca, Morocco	Clay		
Tunisia F1 Futures $15,000	August 26	El Menzah, Tunisia	Hard	(Slovakia) Branislav Sekáč	(Sweden) Henrik Andersson (Australia) Luke Bourgeois
Slovakia F6 Futures $10,000	August 26	Trnava, Slovakia	Clay	(Slovakia) Ladislav Švarc	(Czech Republic) Jan Říha (Czech Republic) Pavel Říha
Brazil F3 Futures $10,000	August 26	Fortaleza, Brazil	Hard	(Argentina) Ignacio González King	(Brazil) Luiz Marafelli (Brazil) Marcio Petrone

=== September ===
Tournament	Date	City	Surface	Singles champions	Doubles champions
Morocco F5 Futures $10,000	September 2	Marrakesh, Morocco	Clay		
Tunisia F2 Futures $15,000	September 2	El Menzah, Tunisia	Hard	(South Africa) Rik de Voest	(South Africa) Rik de Voest (South Africa) Dirk Stegmann
Japan F6 Futures $15,000	September 2	Kashiwa, Japan	Hard	(United States) Doug Bohaboy	(Indonesia) Peter Handoyo (Indonesia) Suwandi
Spain F13 Futures $15,000	September 2	Oviedo, Spain	Clay	(Spain) Óscar Hernández	(Argentina) Juan Pablo Brzezicki (Argentina) Carlos Berlocq
Poland F8 Futures $10,000	September 2	Warsaw, Poland	Clay	(Poland) Bartłomiej Dąbrowski	(Poland) Marcin Golab (Poland) Kamil Lewandowicz
Mexico F14 Futures $10,000	September 2	Mazatlán, Mexico	Hard	(Mexico) Marcello Amador	(Chile) Hermes Gamonal (Chile) Phillip Harboe
India F5 Futures $10,000	September 2	Chennai, India	Hard	(India) Rohan Bopanna	(India) Rohan Bopanna (India) Vijay Kannan
Brazil F4 Futures $10,000	September 2	Florianópolis, Brazil	Clay	(Brazil) Eduardo Bohrer	(Brazil) Marcelo Melo (Brazil) Bruno Soares
Bolivia F1 Futures $10,000	September 9	La Paz, Bolivia	Clay	(Chile) Felipe Parada	(Argentina) Martin Stringari (United States) Casey Smith
Jamaica F13 Futures $10,000	September 9	Montego Bay, Jamaica	Hard	(Netherlands) Jean-Julien Rojer	(United States) Kyle Kliegerman (United States) Kiantki Thomas
USA F24A Futures $10,000	September 9	Claremont, United States	Hard	(Russia) Dmitry Tursunov	(United States) Chris Magyary (United States) Mirko Pehar
Japan F7 Futures $15,000	September 9	Saitama, Japan	Hard	(Chinese Taipei) Lu Yen-hsun	(Japan) Michihisa Onoda (Japan) Takao Suzuki
France F15 Futures $15,000	September 9	Bagnères-de-Bigorre, France	Hard	(South Africa) Rik de Voest	(France) Baptiste Dupuy (France) Nicolas Tourte
Morocco F6 Futures $10,000	September 9	Agadir, Morocco	Clay		
Spain F14 Futures $10,000	September 9	Madrid, Spain	Hard	(Spain) Tati Rascón	(Spain) Angel Jose Martin (Spain) Gabriel Trujillo Soler
Spain F15 Futures $15,000	September 16	Barcelona, Spain	Clay	(Spain) Rafael Nadal	(Spain) Mariano Albert-Ferrando (Spain) Marc Fornell Mestres
Czech Republic F4 Futures $15,000	September 16	Přerov, Czech Republic	Clay	(Czech Republic) Pavel Šnobel	(Czech Republic) Jaroslav Pospíšil (Czech Republic) Pavel Šnobel
Great Britain F7 Futures $10,000	September 16	Glasgow, Great Britain	Hard	(United Kingdom) Richard Bloomfield	(Australia) Luke Bourgeois (Australia) Alun Jones
France F16 Futures $15,000	September 16	Mulhouse, France	Hard	(Belgium) Jeroen Masson	(Germany) Frank Moser (Germany) Bernard Parun
Sweden F1 Futures $15,000	September 16	Gothenburg, Sweden	Hard (i)	(Sweden) Joachim Johansson	(Sweden) Kalle Flygt (Sweden) Fredrik Lovén
Italy F4 Futures $15,000	September 16	Oristano, Italy	Hard	(Italy) Daniele Bracciali	(Italy) Daniele Bracciali (Italy) Filippo Messori
USA F24B Futures $10,000	September 16	Costa Mesa, United States	Hard	(United States) K. J. Hippensteel	(Sweden) Oskar Johansson (New Zealand) James Shortall
Jamaica F14 Futures $10,000	September 16	Trelawny, Montego Bay, Jamaica	Hard	(Germany) Philipp Marx	
Bolivia F2 Futures $10,000	September 16	Cochabamba, Bolivia	Clay	(Argentina) Ignacio González King	(Argentina) Ignacio González King (Argentina) Diego Hartfield
Bolivia F3 Futures $10,000	September 23	Santa Cruz, Bolivia	Clay	(Argentina) Cristian Villagrán	(Argentina) Ignacio González King (Argentina) Diego Hartfield
USA F24C Futures $10,000	September 23	Ojai, United States	Hard	(South Africa) Raven Klaasen	(South Africa) Andrew Anderson (South Africa) W.P. Meyer
Italy F5 Futures $15,000	September 23	Selargius, Italy	Hard	(France) Rodolphe Cadart	(Italy) Simone Bolelli (Italy) Filippo Figliomeni
Great Britain F8 Futures $10,000	September 23	Sunderland, Great Britain	Hard (i)	(United Kingdom) Mark Hilton	(United Kingdom) Jonathan Marray (United Kingdom) David Sherwood
Sweden F2 Futures $15,000	September 23	Gothenburg, Sweden	Hard (i)	(Sweden) Pierre Berntson	(Germany) Aleksandar Djuranovic (Germany) Benjamin Kohllöffel
France F17 Futures $15,000	September 23	Plaisir, France	Hard	(France) Nicolas Mahut	(South Africa) Rik de Voest (South Africa) Dirk Stegmann
Czech Republic F5 Futures $15,000	September 23	Třinec, Czech Republic	Clay	(Czech Republic) Tomáš Berdych	(Czech Republic) Ladislav Chramosta (Czech Republic) Jiri Vencl
Spain F16 Futures $15,000	September 23	Madrid, Spain	Hard	(Spain) Rafael Nadal	(Spain) Angel Jose Martin (Spain) Carlos Rexach-Itoiz
Jamaica F15 Futures $10,000	September 24	Trelawny, Montego Bay, Jamaica	Hard		(United States) Travis Parrott (Paraguay) Francisco Rodríguez
Chile F4 Futures $10,000	September 30	Santiago, Chile	Clay	(Chile) Adrián García	(Brazil) Márcio Carlsson (Sweden) Robert Lindstedt
Spain F17 Futures $10,000	September 30	Martos (Jaén), Spain	Hard	(Spain) Tati Rascón	(Spain) Esteban Carril (Netherlands) Johan Dijkstra
Great Britain F9 Futures $15,000	September 30	Edinburgh, Great Britain	Hard (i)	(South Africa) Wesley Moodie	(Czech Republic) Jakub Hasek (South Africa) Wesley Moodie
France F18 Futures $15,000	September 30	Nevers, France	Hard (i)	(France) Jean-Michel Pequery	(United States) Andres Pedroso (Argentina) Nicolás Todero

=== October ===
Tournament	Date	City	Surface	Singles champions	Doubles champions
Great Britain F10 Futures $15,000	October 7	Jersey, Great Britain	Hard (i)	(Sweden) Nicklas Timfjord	(South Africa) Wesley Moodie (Austria) Luben Pampoulov
France F19 Futures $10,000	October 7	Forbach, France	Carpet (i)	(Czech Republic) Martin Štěpánek	(Germany) Frank Moser (Germany) Bernard Parun
Paraguay F1 Futures $15,000	October 7	Asunción, Paraguay	Clay		
Greece F3 Futures $10,000	October 7	Thessaloniki, Greece	Hard	(Germany) Dieter Kindlmann	(Germany) Dieter Kindlmann (Germany) Markus Wislsperger
Spain F18 Futures $10,000	October 7	El Ejido (Almería), Spain	Hard	(Spain) Rafael Moreno-Negrin	(Spain) Sergi Arumi (Spain) Guillermo Platel
Dominican Republic F1 Futures $10,000	October 7	Santo Domingo, Dominican Republic	Clay	(France) Charles-Edouard Maria	(Netherlands) Bart Beks (Netherlands) Raoul Snijders
Chile F5 Futures $10,000	October 7	Viña del Mar, Chile	Clay	(Argentina) Diego Hartfield	(Argentina) Martin Stringari (Argentina) Sebastian Uriarte
Chile F6 Futures $10,000	October 14	Santiago, Chile	Clay	(Chile) Adrián García	(Chile) Sergio Elias (Chile) Alvaro Loyola
Jamaica F16 Futures $10,000	October 14	Montego Bay, Jamaica	Hard	(France) Cedric Kauffmann	(France) Cedric Kauffmann (United Kingdom) Miles Maclagan
Greece F4 Futures $10,000	October 14	Fthiotikos (Lamia), Greece	Hard		
Cuba F1 Futures $10,000	October 14	Havana, Cuba	Hard	(Cuba) Lázaro Navarro	(Italy) Gianluca Bazzica (Canada) Michal Ciszek
France F20 Futures $10,000	October 14	Saint-Dizier, France	Hard (i)	(Czech Republic) Martin Štěpánek	(Czech Republic) Jan Mertl (Czech Republic) Pavel Říha
USA F25 Futures $15,000	October 14	Lubbock, United States	Hard	(South Africa) Justin Bower	(United States) Huntley Montgomery (United States) Tripp Phillips
Paraguay F2 Futures $15,000	October 14	Asunción, Paraguay	Clay		
Cyprus F1 Futures $10,000	October 21	Nicosia, Cyprus	Clay		
USA F26 Futures $15,000	October 21	Arlington, United States	Hard	(South Africa) Justin Bower	(United States) Huntley Montgomery (United States) Tripp Phillips
France F21 Futures $15,000	October 21	La Roche-sur-Yon, France	Hard (i)	(France) Marc Gicquel	(France) Jérôme Hanquez (France) Régis Lavergne
Hong Kong F1 Futures $15,000	October 21	Hong Kong, Hong Kong, China	Hard		
Namibia F1 Futures $10,000	October 21	Windhoek, Namibia	Hard	(South Africa) Wesley Whitehouse	(South Africa) Johannes Saayman (South Africa) Wesley Whitehouse
Mexico F15 Futures $15,000	October 21	Obregón, Mexico	Hard	(Brazil) Pedro Braga	(Venezuela) José de Armas (Argentina) Ignacio González King
Jamaica F17 Futures $15,000	October 21	Negril, Jamaica	Hard	(Czech Republic) Pavel Šnobel	(France) Cedric Kauffmann (United Kingdom) Miles Maclagan
Jamaica F18 Futures $15,000	October 28	Negril, Jamaica	Clay	(Austria) Daniel Köllerer	(Brazil) Eduardo Bohrer (Venezuela) Kepler Orellana
Botswana F1 Futures $10,000	October 28	Gaborone, Namibia	Hard	(South Africa) Wesley Whitehouse	(Zimbabwe) Genius Chidzikwe (South Africa) Michael De Jongh
Mexico F16 Futures $15,000	October 28	Cd. Juárez, Mexico	Clay	(Argentina) Ignacio González King	(Venezuela) José de Armas (Argentina) Ignacio González King
India F6 Futures $10,000	October 28	Chandigarh, India	Hard	(Russia) Pavel Ivanov	(India) Ajay Ramaswami (India) Sunil-Kumar Sipaeya
Hong Kong F2 Futures $15,000	October 28	Hong Kong, Hong Kong, China	Hard	(Japan) Takahiro Terachi	(Netherlands) Fred Hemmes (Japan) Jun Kato
Czech Republic F6 Futures $10,000	October 28	Prague, Czech Republic	Hard	(Czech Republic) Lukáš Dlouhý	(Czech Republic) Jan Říha (Czech Republic) Pavel Říha
USA F27 Futures $15,000	October 28	Hammond, Louisiana, United States	Hard	(United States) Michael Joyce	(United States) Huntley Montgomery (United States) Tripp Phillips
France F22 Futures $10,000	October 28	Rodez, France	Hard (i)	(France) Jérôme Hanquez	(France) Cyril Baudin (France) Benoit Foucher

=== November ===
Tournament	Date	City	Surface	Singles champions	Doubles champions
Thailand F1 Futures $10,000	November 4	Nakhon Ratchasima, Thailand	Hard	(Netherlands) Fred Hemmes	(Netherlands) Fred Hemmes (Japan) Jun Kato
Czech Republic F7 Futures $10,000	November 4	Frýdlant nad Ostravicí, Czech Republic	Hard	(Czech Republic) František Čermák	(Czech Republic) Lukáš Dlouhý (Czech Republic) David Miketa
Australia F3 Futures $15,000	November 4	Beaumaris, Australia	Clay	(Australia) Todd Larkham	(Australia) Mark Hlawaty (Australia) Sadik Kadir
Mexico F17 Futures $15,000	November 4	Zacatecas, Mexico	Hard	(Mexico) Marcello Amador	(Mexico) Bruno Echagaray (Mexico) Santiago González
India F7 Futures $10,000	November 4	New Delhi, India	Hard	(India) Vinod Sridhar	(India) Vijay Kannan (India) Vishal Uppal
Zimbabwe F1 Futures $10,000	November 4	Bulawayo, Zimbabwe	Hard	(South Africa) Wesley Whitehouse	(Zimbabwe) Genius Chidzikwe (South Africa) Johan Du Randt
Jamaica F19 Futures $10,000	November 4	Montego Bay, Jamaica	Hard	(Netherlands) Jean-Julien Rojer	(Czech Republic) Petr Dezort (Czech Republic) Pavel Šnobel
India F8 Futures $10,000	November 11	Davanagere, India	Hard	(India) Harsh Mankad	(India) Vijay Kannan (India) Vishal Uppal
Uruguay F1 Futures $10,000	November 11	Montevideo, Uruguay	Clay	(Austria) Marko Neunteibl	(Argentina) Guillermo Carry (Argentina) Martin Stringari
Mexico F18 Futures $10,000	November 11	León, Guanajuato, Mexico	Hard	(Federal Republic of Yugoslavia) Janko Tipsarević	(Republic of Ireland) Sean Cooper (Croatia) Krešimir Ritz
Australia F4 Futures $15,000	November 11	Frankston, Australia	Clay	(Australia) Paul Baccanello	(Australia) Jaymon Crabb (Australia) Joseph Sirianni
Barbados F1 Futures $10,000	November 11	Bridgetown, Barbados	Hard	(Netherlands) Jean-Julien Rojer	(Netherlands) Jean-Julien Rojer (Jamaica) Ryan Russell
Czech Republic F8 Futures $10,000	November 11	Hrotovice, Czech Republic	Carpet	(Czech Republic) Tomáš Berdych	(Czech Republic) Jan Minář (Czech Republic) Marek Velicka
Thailand F2 Futures $10,000	November 11	Nonthaburi, Thailand	Hard	(Russia) Mikhail Elgin	(Japan) Hiroki Kondo (Japan) Michihisa Onoda
USA F28 Futures $15,000	November 11	Costa Mesa, United States	Hard	(Chinese Taipei) Jimmy Wang	(India) Prakash Amritraj (United States) Rajeev Ram
Vietnam F1 Futures $10,000	November 18	Hanoi, Vietnam	Hard	(Austria) Herbert Wiltschnig	(South Africa) Johan Du Randt (South Africa) Dirk Stegmann
USA F29 Futures $15,000	November 18	Malibu, United States	Hard	(France) Julien Cassaigne	(United States) Michael Kosta (South Africa) Raven Klaasen
Netherlands Antillies F1 Futures $10,000	November 18	Curaçao, Netherlands Antilles	Hard	(Netherlands) Jean-Julien Rojer	(Czech Republic) Dušan Karol (Czech Republic) Jaroslav Pospíšil
Spain F19 Futures $15,000	November 18	Gran Canaria, Spain	Clay	(Spain) Rafael Nadal	(Spain) Carlos Martinez-Comet (Spain) Germán Puentes
Uruguay F2 Futures $10,000	November 18	Montevideo, Uruguay	Clay	(Argentina) Patricio Rudi	(Argentina) Brian Dabul (Argentina) Leonardo Olguín
Australia F5 Futures $15,000	November 19	Berri, Australia	Grass	(Australia) Alun Jones	(Australia) Paul Baccanello (Australia) Nathan Healey
Australia F6 Futures $15,000	November 25	Barmera, Australia	Grass	(Australia) Mark Hlawaty	(Canada) Simon Larose (Australia) Luke Smith
Spain F20 Futures $15,000	November 25	Gran Canaria, Spain	Clay	(Spain) Rafael Nadal	(Spain) Iván Navarro (Spain) Santiago Ventura
USA F30 Futures $15,000	November 25	Laguna Niguel, United States	Hard	(United States) Rajeev Ram	(United States) Jason Cook (United States) Lester Cook
Aruba F1 Futures $10,000	November 25	Oranjestad, Aruba	Hard	(Netherlands) Jean-Julien Rojer	(Czech Republic) Dušan Karol (Czech Republic) Jaroslav Pospíšil
Philippines F1 Futures $10,000	November 25	Manila, Philippines	Hard		

=== December ===
Tournament	Date	City	Surface	Singles champions	Doubles champions
Spain F21 Futures $10,000	December 2	Pontevedra, Spain	Clay (i)	(Croatia) Roko Karanušić	(Spain) Carlos Martinez-Comet (Spain) Germán Puentes
Czech Republic F9 Futures $15,000	December 2	Ostrava, Czech Republic	Hard (i)	(Czech Republic) Lukáš Dlouhý	(Germany) Philipp Petzschner (Germany) Simon Stadler
Jamaica F20 Futures $10,000	December 2	Montego Bay, Jamaica	Hard	(Argentina) Juan Mónaco	(France) Cedric Kauffmann (Paraguay) Francisco Rodríguez
Jamaica F21 Futures $10,000	December 9	Montego Bay, Jamaica	Hard	(Poland) Michał Przysiężny	(United States) Michael Kosta (South Africa) Raven Klaasen
Spain F22 Futures $10,000	December 9	Ourense, Spain	Hard (i)	(France) Thierry Ascione	(United Kingdom) Oliver Freelove (Andorra) Joan Jimenez-Guerra
Czech Republic F10 Futures $15,000	December 9	Unknown, Czech Republic	Clay	(Germany) Philipp Petzschner	(Poland) Mariusz Fyrstenberg (Poland) Łukasz Kubot
Jamaica F22 Futures $10,000	December 16	Trelawny, Montego Bay, Jamaica	Hard	(Netherlands) Jean-Julien Rojer	(Netherlands) Jean-Julien Rojer (Jamaica) Ryan Russell
