= Ciszek =

Ciszek is a Polish surname derived from a nickname for a "quiet" man (silent; modest, simple, humble; secretive, insidious) or from a diminutive for the given name Cisz, which is an abbreviation of some Old Polish dithematic names, such as Cirzpisław, Cichorad. Notable people with the surname include:

- Andrea Seastrand née Ciszek
- Łukasz Ciszek
- Margaret Bartley née Ciszek
- Michal Ciszek
- Walter Ciszek
