= 2013 Erste Bank Open – Singles =

Singles
- 2013 Erste Bank Open

Final
- Champion: (Germany) Tommy Haas
- Runner-up: (Netherlands) Robin Haase
- Score: 6–3, 4–6, 6–4

Details
- Draw: 28
- Seeds: 8

Events
Singles	Doubles
- Vienna Open

Juan Martín del Potro was the defending champion but decided not to compete.
Tommy Haas won the title, defeating Robin Haase in the final, 6–3, 4–6, 6–4.

== Seeds ==
The first four seeds received a bye into the second round.

1. (France) Jo-Wilfried Tsonga (semifinals)
2. (Germany) Tommy Haas (champion)
3. (Italy) Fabio Fognini (quarterfinals)
4. (Germany) Philipp Kohlschreiber (second round)
5. (Czech Republic) Radek Štěpánek (quarterfinals)
6. (France) Gaël Monfils (first round)
7. (Canada) Vasek Pospisil (second round)
8. (Czech Republic) Lukáš Rosol (semifinals)

== Draw ==
Key

- Q = Qualifier
- WC = Wild card
- LL = Lucky loser
- Alt = Alternate
- ITF = ITF entry
- PR = Protected ranking
- SR = Special ranking
- SE = Special exempt
- JE = Junior exempt
- JR = Junior Accelerator Programme entrant
- CO = College Accelerator Programme entrant
- NG = Next Gen Accelerator Program entrant
- w/o = Walkover
- r = Retired
- d = Defaulted

=== Finals ===
Semifinals
1	(France) Jo-Wilfried Tsonga	5	6^{4}
(Netherlands) Robin Haase	7	7^{7}
8	(Czech Republic) Lukáš Rosol	6	4	6^{0}
2	(Germany) Tommy Haas	3	6	7^{7}

Final
(Netherlands) Robin Haase	3	6	4
2	(Germany) Tommy Haas	6	4	6

=== Top half ===
First round
(Germany) D Brands	6	7^{7}
(Austria) A Haider-Maurer	4	6^{5}
WC	(Austria) D Thiem	6	5	6
(Spain) D Gimeno Traver	4	7	4
LL	(Czech Republic) J Pospíšil	7^{7}	7
6	(France) G Monfils	6^{0}	5
(Germany) F Mayer	6^{1}	4
(Poland) Ł Kubot	7^{7}	6
Q	(Serbia) I Bozoljac	7	2	1
(Netherlands) R Haase	5	6	6
(Australia) L Hewitt	6^{6}	4
7	(Canada) V Pospisil	7^{8}	6

Second round
1	(France) J-W Tsonga	7	1	6
(Germany) D Brands	5	6	3
WC	(Austria) D Thiem	6	6
LL	(Czech Republic) J Pospíšil	1	1
3	(Italy) F Fognini	7	6
(Poland) Ł Kubot	5	2
(Netherlands) R Haase	7^{7}	6^{5}	6
7	(Canada) V Pospisil	6^{3}	7^{7}	2

Quarterfinals
1	(France) J-W Tsonga	6	3	7^{7}
WC	(Austria) D Thiem	4	6	6^{3}
3	(Italy) F Fognini	7^{7}	1	1
(Netherlands) R Haase	6^{4}	6	6

Semifinals
1	(France) J-W Tsonga	5	6^{4}
(Netherlands) R Haase	7	7^{7}

=== Bottom half ===
First round
8	(Czech Republic) L Rosol	6	7
(Netherlands) J Huta Galung	3	5
(United States) M Russell	3	4
Q	(Bosnia and Herzegovina) M Bašić	6	6
(Czech Republic) J Hájek	2	0
Q	(Belgium) R Bemelmans	6	6
5	(Czech Republic) R Štěpánek	7	6
WC	(Austria) M Fischer	5	3
WC	(Austria) G Melzer	6^{5}	1
(Slovakia) L Lacko	7^{7}	6
Q	(Slovakia) M Mečíř Jr.	6	6
(Spain) P Andújar	4	4

Second round
8	(Czech Republic) L Rosol	6	7
Q	(Bosnia and Herzegovina) M Bašić	3	5
Q	(Belgium) R Bemelmans	4	6	7^{7}
4	(Germany) P Kohlschreiber	6	1	6^{0}
5	(Czech Republic) R Štěpánek	7^{7}	5	7^{7}
(Slovakia) L Lacko	6^{4}	7	6^{5}
Q	(Slovakia) M Mečíř Jr.	5	6^{8}
2	(Germany) T Haas	7	7^{10}

Quarterfinals
8	(Czech Republic) L Rosol	6	1	6
Q	(Belgium) R Bemelmans	3	6	3
5	(Czech Republic) R Štěpánek	6^{10}	3
2	(Germany) T Haas	7^{12}	6

Semifinals
8	(Czech Republic) L Rosol	6	4	6^{0}
2	(Germany) T Haas	3	6	7^{7}

== Qualifying ==
=== Seeds ===
The first three seeds received a bye into the second round.

1. (United States) Ryan Harrison (second round)
2. (Romania) Adrian Ungur (qualifying competition)
3. (Belgium) Ruben Bemelmans (qualified)
4. (Bosnia and Herzegovina) Mirza Bašić (qualified)
5. (Czech Republic) Jaroslav Pospíšil (qualifying competition, lucky loser)
6. (Hungary) Márton Fucsovics (qualifying competition)
7. (Slovakia) Miloslav Mečíř Jr. (qualified)
8. (Serbia) Ilija Bozoljac (qualified)

=== Qualifiers ===
1. (Slovakia) Miloslav Mečíř Jr.
2. (Serbia) Ilija Bozoljac
3. (Belgium) Ruben Bemelmans
4. (Bosnia and Herzegovina) Mirza Bašić

=== Lucky losers ===
1. (Czech Republic) Jaroslav Pospíšil

=== Qualifying draw ===
==== First qualifier ====
First round
(Germany) Kevin Krawietz	6^{4}	6	6
(Austria) Mario Haider-Maurer	7^{7}	4	1
(Bulgaria) Tihomir Grozdanov	3	6^{4}
(Austria) Nikolaus Moser	6	7^{7}
WC	(Austria) Lucas Miedler	4	4
7	(Slovakia) Miloslav Mečíř Jr.	6	6

Second round
1	(United States) Ryan Harrison	6^{6}	7^{7}	4
(Germany) Kevin Krawietz	7^{8}	6^{4}	6
(Austria) Nikolaus Moser	6	6^{2}	5
7	(Slovakia) Miloslav Mečíř Jr.	4	7^{7}	7

Qualifying competition
(Germany) Kevin Krawietz	3	6^{5}
7	(Slovakia) Miloslav Mečíř Jr.	6	7^{7}

==== Second qualifier ====
First round
(Austria) Marc Rath	6	7
(Australia) Oliver Ceranic	4	5
(Austria) Lukas Jastraunig	3	6	6
(Austria) Daniel Eger	6	0	0
WC	(Austria) Marco Procházka	1	1
8	(Serbia) Ilija Bozoljac	6	6

Second round
2	(Romania) Adrian Ungur	6	6
(Austria) Marc Rath	2	4
(Austria) Lukas Jastraunig	0	3
8	(Serbia) Ilija Bozoljac	6	6

Qualifying competition
2	(Romania) Adrian Ungur	6	3	4
8	(Serbia) Ilija Bozoljac	4	6	6

==== Third qualifier ====
First round
(Bosnia and Herzegovina) Aldin Šetkić	6	6
(Austria) Marius Pimishofer	2	2
(Austria) Johannes Schretter	3	0
(Moldova) Maxim Dubarenco	6	6
(Croatia) Filip Veger	4	2
5	(Czech Republic) Jaroslav Pospíšil	6	6

Second round
3	(Belgium) Ruben Bemelmans	6	6
(Bosnia and Herzegovina) Aldin Šetkić	2	1
(Moldova) Maxim Dubarenco	4	2
5	(Czech Republic) Jaroslav Pospíšil	6	6

Qualifying competition
3	(Belgium) Ruben Bemelmans	6	3	6
5	(Czech Republic) Jaroslav Pospíšil	2	6	3

==== Fourth qualifier ====
First round
4	(Bosnia and Herzegovina) Mirza Bašić	6	6
WC	(Austria) Jan Poskocil	2	3
(Romania) Adnan Al Mahmoud	0	3
(Austria) Philip Lang	6	6
(Austria) Daniel Geib	2	3
(Austria) Maximilian Neuchrist	6	6
(Austria) Patrick Ofner	2	0
6	(Hungary) Márton Fucsovics	6	6

Second round
4	(Bosnia and Herzegovina) Mirza Bašić	6	6
(Austria) Philip Lang	4	2
(Austria) Maximilian Neuchrist	6	3	2
6	(Hungary) Márton Fucsovics	2	6	6

Qualifying competition
4	(Bosnia and Herzegovina) Mirza Bašić	6	6
6	(Hungary) Márton Fucsovics	1	1
