= KC Corkery =

American tennis player

- Country (sports): United States
- Residence: Manhattan Beach, California, USA
- Born: 26 April 1983 (age 42) United States
- Height: 6 ft 3 in (191 cm)
- Plays: Right-handed (two-handed backhand)
- College: Stanford University
- Prize money: $25,163

Singles
- Career record: 0–0
- Career titles: 0; 0 Challenger, 1 Futures
- Highest ranking: No. 493 (21 October 2002)

Grand Slam singles results
- US Open: Q1 (2002)

Doubles
- Career record: 0–1
- Career titles: 0; 0 Challenger, 7 Futures
- Highest ranking: No. 401 (2 December 2002)

Grand Slam doubles results
- US Open: 1R (2004)
- Last updated on: 30 June 2021.

KC Corkery (born April 26, 1983) is a retired American male tennis player.

== College career ==
Corkery was a three-time All-American in singles and a four-time All-American in doubles.

Corkery was the 2004 NCAA doubles champion with Sam Warburg and semi-finalist in the 2006 NCAA singles championship.

In 2003, he was the Pac-10 Freshman of the Year, ITA West Region Rookie of the Year, and Stanford Freshman Athlete of the Year.

== Pro circuit career ==
Corkery won a Futures tournament in 2003 at Auburn, California.

Corkery competed in the men's singles of the 2002 US Open. Corkery competed in the men's doubles of the 2004 US Open where he partnered with Warburg, losing in the first round.

In 2006, Corkery played World Team Tennis.

Before college, Corkery was the singles and doubles champion at the 2001 International Grasscourts. He was also the 1999 singles and doubles champion at the National Indoors.

== ATP Challenger and ITF Futures finals ==
=== Singles: 3 (1–2) ===
Legend ATP Challenger (0–0) ITF Futures (1–2)	Finals by surface Hard (1–1) Clay (0–0) Grass (0–0) Carpet (0–1)

Result	W–L	Date	Tournament	Tier	Surface	Opponent	Score
Loss	0–1	Oct 2001	USA F22, Lubbock	Futures	Hard	(United States) Jeff Williams	3–6, 7–5, 1–6
Loss	0–2	Apr 2002	Japan F2, Shirako	Futures	Carpet	(Japan) Tasuku Iwami	1–6, 6–7^{(6–8)}
Win	1–2	Jun 2003	USA F16, Auburn	Futures	Hard	(United States) David Martin	7–6^{(7–5)}, 6–2

=== Doubles: 14 (7–7) ===
Legend ATP Challenger (0–0) ITF Futures (7–7)	Finals by surface Hard (5–6) Clay (1–1) Grass (0–0) Carpet (1–0)

Result	W–L	Date	Tournament	Tier	Surface	Partner	Opponents	Score
Win	1–0	Apr 2002	Japan F2, Shirako	Futures	Carpet	(United States) Brandon Kramer	(Japan) Michihisa Onoda (Japan) Masahide Sakamoto	6–4, 6–4
Loss	1–1	Jun 2002	USA F17, Williamsville	Futures	Clay	(United States) Ryan Sachire	(Paraguay) Francisco Rodriguez (South Africa) Nenad Toroman	5–7, 6–3, 4–6
Win	2–1	Jul 2002	USA F19, Peoria	Futures	Clay	(South Africa) Dirk Stegmann	(Argentina) Ignacio Gonzalez-King (Argentina) Pablo Gonzalez-King	7–5, 6–3
Loss	2–2	Aug 2002	Great Britain F5, Bath	Futures	Hard	(United Kingdom) Oliver Freelove	(Australia) Andrew Derer (Australia) Luke Smith	2–6, 6–7^{(6–8)}
Win	3–2	Aug 2002	Great Britain F6, London	Futures	Hard	(United Kingdom) Oliver Freelove	(South Africa) Heinrich Heyl (Belgium) Jeroen Masson	4–6, 6–4, 6–1
Loss	3–3	Sep 2002	USA F24A, Claremont	Futures	Hard	(South Africa) Willem-Petrus Meyer	(United States) Chris Magyary (United States) Mirko Pehar	6–7^{(4–7)}, 2–6
Loss	3–4	Jun 2003	USA F16, Auburn	Futures	Hard	(United States) James Pade	(United States) John-Paul Fruttero (United States) Bobby Reynolds	4–6, 4–6
Win	4–4	Sep 2003	USA F25, Claremont	Futures	Hard	(United States) James Pade	(United States) Scott Lipsky (United States) David Martin	6–4, 6–7^{(5–7)}, 6–3
Loss	4–5	Jul 2004	USA F16, Chico	Futures	Hard	(United States) Sam Warburg	(United States) Jason Cook (United States) Lester Cook	5–7, 6–7^{(5–7)}
Win	5–5	Jul 2004	USA F20, Joplin	Futures	Hard	(United States) Jeremy Wurtzman	(Australia) Raphael Durek (Australia) Adam Feeney	7–5, 3–6, 6–2
Win	6–5	Jul 2005	Japan F8, Tokyo	Futures	Hard	(United States) James Pade	(United States) Minh Le (Japan) Hiroyasu Sato	7–6^{(7–4)}, 7–5
Win	7–5	Sep 2005	USA F22, Claremont	Futures	Hard	(United States) James Pade	(United States) Troy Hahn (United States) Hamid Mirzadeh	6–4, 4–6, 6–2
Loss	7–6	Aug 2006	Finland F2, Helsinki	Futures	Hard	(United Kingdom) Robert Searle	(Denmark) Frederik Nielsen (Finland) Juho Paukku	6–3, 4–6, 3–6
Loss	7–7	Sep 2006	USA F23, Costa Mesa	Futures	Hard	(United States) Pete Stroer	(United States) Joel Kielbowicz (United States) Ryan Stotland	6–3, 3–6, 4–6
