= 2013 Erste Bank Open – Doubles =

Doubles
- 2013 Erste Bank Open

Final
- Champions: (Romania) Florin Mergea (Czech Republic) Lukáš Rosol
- Runners-up: (Austria) Julian Knowle (Canada) Daniel Nestor
- Score: 7–5, 6–4

Details
- Draw: 16
- Seeds: 4

Events
Singles	Doubles
← 2012 ·	Vienna Open	· 2014 →

Andre Begemann and Martin Emmrich were the defending champions, but lost in the first round to Mariusz Fyrstenberg and Marcin Matkowski.
Florin Mergea and Lukáš Rosol won the title, defeating Julian Knowle and Daniel Nestor in the final, 7–5, 6–4.

== Seeds ==
1. (Austria) Alexander Peya / (Brazil) Bruno Soares (quarterfinals)
2. (Poland) Mariusz Fyrstenberg / (Poland) Marcin Matkowski (quarterfinals)
3. (Austria) Julian Knowle / (Canada) Daniel Nestor (final)
4. (United Kingdom) Jamie Murray / (Australia) John Peers (quarterfinals)

== Draw ==
=== Key ===
- Q = Qualifier
- WC = Wild card
- LL = Lucky loser
- Alt = Alternate
- SE = Special exempt
- PR = Protected ranking
- ITF = ITF entry
- JE = Junior exempt
- w/o = Walkover
- r = Retired
- d = Defaulted
- SR = Special ranking

=== Draw ===
First round
1	(Austria) A Peya (Brazil) B Soares	6	6
(Czech Republic) L Dlouhý (Australia) P Hanley	2	3
(Israel) J Erlich (Israel) A Ram	4	3
(Romania) F Mergea (Czech Republic) L Rosol	6	6
4	(United Kingdom) J Murray (Australia) J Peers	6	4	[10]
(Spain) D Gimeno-Traver (Czech Republic) J Hájek	0	6	[6]
WC	(Austria) M Neuchrist (Austria) D Thiem	6	6
(Germany) D Brands (Germany) P Kohlschreiber	2	4
(Germany) C Kas (Austria) O Marach	7	4	[5]
(Netherlands) R Haase (Netherlands) J Huta Galung	5	6	[10]
WC	(Austria) A Haider-Maurer (Austria) G Melzer	3	2
3	(Austria) J Knowle (Canada) D Nestor	6	6
(Slovakia) L Lacko (United States) M Russell	1	2
PR	(Czech Republic) J Levinský (Croatia) M Pavić	6	6
(Germany) A Begemann (Germany) M Emmrich	3	4
2	(Poland) M Fyrstenberg (Poland) M Matkowski	6	6

Quarterfinals
1	(Austria) A Peya (Brazil) B Soares	5	6	[8]
(Romania) F Mergea (Czech Republic) L Rosol	7	3	[10]
4	(United Kingdom) J Murray (Australia) J Peers	3	4
WC	(Austria) M Neuchrist (Austria) D Thiem	6	6
(Netherlands) R Haase (Netherlands) J Huta Galung	3	3
3	(Austria) J Knowle (Canada) D Nestor	6	6
PR	(Czech Republic) J Levinský (Croatia) M Pavić	6	6^{2}	[10]
2	(Poland) M Fyrstenberg (Poland) M Matkowski	4	7^{7}	[6]

Semifinals
(Romania) F Mergea (Czech Republic) L Rosol	6	6
WC	(Austria) M Neuchrist (Austria) D Thiem	4	4
3	(Austria) J Knowle (Canada) D Nestor	6	6
PR	(Czech Republic) J Levinský (Croatia) M Pavić	3	2

Final
(Romania) F Mergea (Czech Republic) L Rosol	7	6
3	(Austria) J Knowle (Canada) D Nestor	5	4
