= Brian Wilson (tennis) =

American tennis player

- Country (sports): United States
- Residence: Las Vegas, Nevada, USA
- Born: May 23, 1982 (age 43); Oceanside, California, United States
- Height: 6 ft 3 in (1.91 m)
- Turned pro: 2004
- Plays: Right-handed
- Prize money: $132,648

Singles
- Career record: 1–4
- Career titles: 0
- Highest ranking: No. 232 (10 September 2007)

Grand Slam singles results
- Australian Open: 1R (2007)
- Wimbledon: Q2 (2007)
- US Open: Q2 (2007)

Doubles
- Career record: 0–2
- Career titles: 0
- Highest ranking: No. 120 (22 October 2007)

Grand Slam doubles results
- US Open: 1R (2003)
- Last updated on: 25 October 2021.

Brian Wilson (born May 23, 1982) is a former professional tennis player from the United States.

== Career ==
Wilson played collegiate tennis for the University of Illinois. He earned All-American selection as both a singles and doubles player during his college career. In 2003 he was a member of the team which won the NCAA Championships and he was also the doubles champion, partnering Rajeev Ram. It was with Ram that he took part in the men's doubles at the 2003 US Open, where they were beaten in the first round by Robby Ginepri and Bobby Reynolds.

On the ATP Tour, Wilson had his best performance at the 2006 SAP Open in San Jose, California, beating Ivo Karlović, then 61st in the world.

After making his way through qualifying, he made his Grand Slam singles debut in the 2007 Australian Open. He lost in the opening round to Feliciano López, in four sets.

== ATP Challenger and ITF Futures finals ==
=== Singles: 5 (4–1) ===
Legend ATP Challenger (0–1) ITF Futures (4–0)	Finals by surface Hard (4–1) Clay (0–0) Grass (0–0) Carpet (0–0)

Result	W–L	Date	Tournament	Tier	Surface	Opponent	Score
Win	1–0	Aug 2004	USA F23, Kenosha	Futures	Hard	(United States) Ryan Newport	7–5, 7–6^{(7–2)}
Win	2–0	Mar 2006	Canada F1, Laval	Futures	Hard	(Netherlands) Robin Haase	4–6, 6–2, 6–4
Win	3–0	Sep 2006	Italy F31, Sassari	Futures	Hard	(Italy) Massimo Dell'Acqua	6–2, 2–0 ret.
Win	4–0	Oct 2006	USA F25, Laguna Niguel	Futures	Hard	(South Africa) Izak Van Der Merwe	6–7^{(5–7)}, 6–2, 6–4
Loss	4–1	Jul 2007	Lexington, United States	Challenger	Hard	(United States) John Isner	7–6^{(11–9)}, 3–6, 4–6

=== Doubles: 28 (17–11) ===
Legend ATP Challenger (5–4) ITF Futures (12–7)	Finals by surface Hard (16–10) Clay (1–0) Grass (0–0) Carpet (0–1)

Result	W–L	Date	Tournament	Tier	Surface	Partner	Opponents	Score
Win	1–0	Jun 2001	USA F14, Seminole	Futures	Clay	(United States) Jeff Laski	(Australia) Jaymon Crabb (Australia) James Sekulov	6–3, 6–2
Win	2–0	Jun 2002	USA F13, Fresno	Futures	Hard	(United States) Nick Rainey	(Australia) Luke Bourgeois (Australia) Alun Jones	6–3, 1–6, 6–4
Win	3–0	Jun 2002	USA F15, Berkeley	Futures	Hard	(United States) Nick Rainey	(Australia) Luke Bourgeois (Australia) Alun Jones	6–3, 3–6, 6–3
Win	4–0	Jun 2002	USA F16, Auburn	Futures	Hard	(United States) Nick Rainey	(South Africa) Willem-Petrus Meyer (South Africa) Dirk Stegmann	6–2, 6–4
Loss	4–1	Jun 2003	USA F14, Sunnyvale	Futures	Hard	(United States) Nick Rainey	(United States) Lester Cook (United States) Ryan Newport	6–2, 3–6, 1–6
Win	5–1	Jun 2003	USA F15, Chico	Futures	Hard	(United States) Rajeev Ram	(United States) Lesley Joseph (South Africa) Dirk Stegmann	6–3, 6–4
Win	6–1	Sep 2004	USA F24, Claremont	Futures	Hard	(United States) Nick Rainey	(United States) Huntley Montgomery (United States) Bobby Reynolds	6–4, 6–4
Loss	6–2	Oct 2004	USA F27, Laguna Niguel	Futures	Hard	(South Africa) Justin Bower	(United States) Jeremy Wurtzman (United States) Mirko Pehar	6–3, 4–6, 6–7^{(2–7)}
Win	7–2	Oct 2004	Burbank, United States	Challenger	Hard	(United States) Nick Rainey	(India) Prakash Amritraj (United States) Eric Taino	6–2, 6–3
Win	8–2	Jan 2005	Great Britain F2, Devon	Futures	Hard	(United States) Scott Lipsky	(Netherlands) Paul Logtens (Netherlands) Martijn Van Haasteren	6–1, 6–4
Win	9–2	May 2005	Mexico F5, Chetumal	Futures	Hard	(United States) Nick Rainey	(Mexico) Juan-Manuel Elizondo (Mexico) Daniel Langre	4–6, 6–3, 6–2
Win	10–2	Jun 2005	USA F12, Woodland	Futures	Hard	(United States) Nick Rainey	(United States) Ryler Deheart (United States) Scoville Jenkins	7–5, 6–4
Win	11–2	Jun 2005	USA F13, Auburn	Futures	Hard	(United States) Nick Rainey	(Australia) Raphael Durek (Australia) Robert Smeets	6–3, 6–2
Win	12–2	Nov 2005	Nashville, United States	Challenger	Hard	(Socialist Federal Republic of Yugoslavia) Ilija Bozoljac	(Mexico) Santiago Gonzalez (Argentina) Diego Hartfield	7–6^{(8–6)}, 6–4
Loss	12–3	Jan 2006	USA F2, Kissimmee	Futures	Hard	(United States) Jeremy Wurtzman	(United States) Alex Kuznetsov (United States) Scott Oudsema	3–6, 2–6
Win	13–3	Jan 2006	USA F3, Boca Raton	Futures	Hard	(United States) Jeremy Wurtzman	(United States) Jesse Levine (United States) Michael Shabaz	6–2, 7–6^{(7–4)}
Loss	13–4	Mar 2006	Canada F1, Laval	Futures	Hard	(United States) Philip Stolt	(South Africa) Izak Van Der Merwe (United States) Jeremy Wurtzman	6–7^{(1–7)}, 6–3, 0–6
Loss	13–5	Jun 2006	Ireland F1, Limerick	Futures	Carpet	(United States) Troy Hahn	(Denmark) Frederik Nielsen (Denmark) Rasmus Norby	2–6, 2–6
Win	14–5	Sep 2006	Italy F31, Sassari	Futures	Hard	(United States) James Cerretani	(Slovakia) Viktor Bruthans (Italy) Marco Pedrini	6–2, 6–3
Loss	14–6	Oct 2006	Sacramento, United States	Challenger	Hard	(United States) Amer Delic	(United States) Paul Goldstein (United States) Jeff Morrison	1–6, 3–6
Loss	14–7	Nov 2006	Champaign Urbana, United States	Challenger	Hard	(Brazil) Andre Sa	(South Africa) Rik De Voest (United States) Rajeev Ram	3–6, 6–4, [7–10]
Win	15–7	Dec 2006	Maui, United States	Challenger	Hard	(United States) Rajeev Ram	(Brazil) Rodrigo-Antonio Grilli (United States) Chris Lam	6–3, 6–2
Loss	15–8	Mar 2007	France F4, Lille	Futures	Hard	(Romania) Florin Mergea	(France) Gregory Carraz (France) Alexandre Sidorenko	7–6^{(7–4)}, 4–6, 3–6
Loss	15–9	Apr 2007	Mexico City, Mexico	Challenger	Hard	(United States) Brendan Evans	(Mexico) Miguel Gallardo-Valles (Mexico) Carlos Palencia	3–6, 3–6
Loss	15–10	Apr 2007	USA F8, Little Rock	Futures	Hard	(United States) Brendan Evans	(Japan) Gregory Carraz (United States) Donald Young	6–7^{(5–7)}, 4–6
Loss	15–11	Sep 2007	Tulsa, United States	Challenger	Hard	(United States) Alex Bogomolov Jr.	(United States) Bobby Reynolds (United States) Rajeev Ram	4–6, 2–6
Win	16–11	Oct 2007	Sacramento, United States	Challenger	Hard	(United States) Robert Kendrick	(United States) John Paul Fruttero (United States) Sam Warburg	7–5, 7–6^{(10–8)}
Win	17–11	Oct 2007	Calabasas, United States	Challenger	Hard	(United States) John Isner	(United States) Robert Kendrick (Philippines) Cecil Mamiit	7–6^{(12–10)}, 4–6, [10–8]
