= 2013 Erste Bank Open =

- Date: 14–20 October
- Edition: 39th
- Category: ATP World Tour 250 Series
- Draw: 28S / 16D
- Prize money: €501,355
- Surface: Hard
- Location: Vienna, Austria
- Venue: Wiener Stadthalle

Champions

Singles
- (Germany) Tommy Haas

Doubles
- (Romania) Florin Mergea / (Czech Republic) Lukáš Rosol
- Vienna Open

The 2013 Erste Bank Open was a men's tennis tournament played on indoor hard courts. It was the 39th edition of the event known that year as the Erste Bank Open, and part of the ATP World Tour 250 Series of the 2013 ATP World Tour. It was held at the Wiener Stadthalle in Vienna, Austria, from 14 October through 20 October 2013. Second-seeded Tommy Haas won the singles title.

== Finals ==
=== Singles ===
- (Germany) Tommy Haas defeated (Netherlands) Robin Haase, 6–3, 4–6, 6–4

=== Doubles ===
- (Romania) Florin Mergea / (Czech Republic) Lukáš Rosol defeated (Austria) Julian Knowle / (Canada) Daniel Nestor, 7–5, 6–4

== Singles main-draw entrants ==
=== Seeds ===
Country	Player	Rank^{1}	Seed
FRA	Jo-Wilfried Tsonga	9	1
GER	Tommy Haas	12	2
ITA	Fabio Fognini	17	3
GER	Philipp Kohlschreiber	23	4
CZE	Radek Štěpánek	39	5
FRA	Gaël Monfils	42	6
CAN	Vasek Pospisil	43	7
CZE	Lukáš Rosol	45	8

- Rankings are as of October 7, 2013

=== Other entrants ===
The following players received wildcards into the singles main draw:

- (Austria) Martin Fischer
- (Austria) Gerald Melzer
- (Austria) Dominic Thiem

The following players received entry from the qualifying draw:

- (Bosnia and Herzegovina) Mirza Bašić
- (Belgium) Ruben Bemelmans
- (Serbia) Ilija Bozoljac
- (Slovakia) Miloslav Mečíř Jr.

The following player received entry as lucky loser:

- (Czech Republic) Jaroslav Pospíšil

=== Withdrawals ===
Before the tournament

- (Spain) Roberto Bautista Agut
- (Romania) Victor Hănescu
- (Australia) Marinko Matosevic
- (Austria) Jürgen Melzer (shoulder injury)
- (Slovenia) Grega Žemlja

== Doubles main-draw entrants ==
=== Seeds ===
Country	Player	Country	Player	Rank^{1}	Seed
AUT	Alexander Peya	BRA	Bruno Soares	7	1
POL	Mariusz Fyrstenberg	POL	Marcin Matkowski	42	2
AUT	Julian Knowle	CAN	Daniel Nestor	56	3
GBR	Jamie Murray	AUS	John Peers	66	4

- Rankings are as of October 7, 2013

=== Other entrants ===
The following pairs received wildcards into the doubles main draw:

- (Austria) Andreas Haider-Maurer / (Austria) Gerald Melzer
- (Austria) Maximilian Neuchrist / (Austria) Dominic Thiem

=== Withdrawals ===
Before the tournament

- (Austria) Jürgen Melzer (shoulder injury)
