= Gianluca Bazzica =

Italian tennis player

- Country (sports): Italy
- Born: 2 November 1975 (age 49)
- Plays: Right-handed
- Prize money: $23,754

Singles
- Highest ranking: No. 595 (25 Jun 2001)

Doubles
- Career record: 0–1
- Highest ranking: No. 176 (4 Oct 2004)

Gianluca Bazzica (born 2 November 1975) is an Italian former professional tennis player.

Bazzica reached career best rankings of 595 in singles and 176 in doubles. Most successful in doubles, he won three ITF Futures titles, finished runner-up in four ATP Challenger finals and made an ATP Tour main draw appearance at the 2004 Generali Open Kitzbühel.

== ATP Challenger/ITF Futures finals ==
=== Doubles: 11 (3–8) ===
Legend
ATP Challenger (0–4)
ITF Futures (3–4)

Result	W–L	Date	Tournament	Tier	Surface	Partner	Opponents	Score
Loss	0–1	May 2001	Italy F1, Tortoreto Lido	Futures	Clay	(Italy) Alessandro Da Col	(Argentina) Diego Álvarez (Italy) Nahuel Fracassi	2–6, 3–6
Loss	0–2	Jul 2001	Italy F9, Rimini	Futures	Clay	(Italy) Fabio Colangelo	(Italy) Francesco Aldi (Italy) Stefano Mocci	6–2, 3–6, 6–7^{(4)}
Win	1–2	Aug 2001	Italy F10, Jesi	Futures	Clay	(Italy) Fabio Colangelo	(Romania) Adrian Cruciat (Italy) Stefano Mocci	6–7^{(2)}, 7–5, 6–2
Loss	1–3	Apr 2002	Japan F3, Takamori	Futures	Carpet	(Italy) Riccardo Capannelli	(Japan) Yasuo Miyazaki (Japan) Hiroyasu Sato	3–6, 2–6
Loss	1–4	Sep 2002	Jamaica F15, Trelawny	Futures	Hard	(United States) Kyle Kliegerman	(United States) Travis Parrott (Paraguay) Francisco Rodríguez	4–6, 2–6
Win	2–4	Oct 2002	Cuba F1, Havana	Futures	Hard	(Canada) Michal Ciszek	(Czech Republic) Dušan Karol (Czech Republic) Jaroslav Pospíšil	7–6^{(6)}, 7–5
Win	3–4	May 2003	Italy F8, Verona	Futures	Clay	(Russia) Philipp Mukhometov	(Italy) Alessandro Da Col (Italy) Christian Persico	6–4, 7–6^{(5)}
Loss	0–1	Dec 2003	Ischgl Challenger, Ischgl	Challenger	Carpet	(Italy) Massimo Dell'Acqua	(Austria) Julian Knowle (Austria) Alexander Peya	2–6, 3–6
Loss	0–2	Jun 2004	Sassuolo Challenger, Sassuolo	Challenger	Clay	(Chile) Paul Capdeville	(Italy) Enzo Artoni (Argentina) Ignacio González King	6–3, 4–6, 1–6
Loss	0–3	Nov 2004	Helsinki Challenger, Helsinki	Challenger	Hard	(Italy) Massimo Dell'Acqua	(Sweden) Robert Lindstedt (Chinese Taipei) Lu Yen-hsun	2–6, 2–6
Loss	0–4	Dec 2004	Ischgl Challenger, Ischgl	Challenger	Carpet	(Italy) Massimo Dell'Acqua	(Italy) Leonardo Azzaro (Germany) Christopher Kas	5–7, 3–6
