= Michal Ciszek =

Canadian professional tennis player

- Country (sports): Canada
- Born: 22 January 1978 (age 47)
- Prize money: $16,551

Singles
- Highest ranking: No. 536 (22 Nov 2004)

Doubles
- Career record: 0–1
- Highest ranking: No. 366 (4 Nov 2002)

Michal Ciszek (born 22 January 1978) is a former Canadian professional tennis player.

Ciszek, who came to Canada from Poland, had career best rankings of 536 in singles and 366 in doubles.

During his career he made two ATP Challenger doubles semi-finals and featured in the doubles main draw of the 2002 Canada Masters in Toronto, as a wildcard pairing with Philip Gubenco.

Ciszek married tennis player Natalia Cretu.

== ITF Futures titles ==
=== Doubles: (2) ===
No.	Date	Tournament	Surface	Partner	Opponents	Score
1.	Jun 2002	Canada F2, Montreal	Hard	(Canada) Nicolas Brochu	(United States) Jeff Laski (Canada) Andrew Nisker	7–5, 4–6, 7–6^{(6)}
2.	Oct 2002	Cuba F1, Havana	Hard	(Italy) Gianluca Bazzica	(Czech Republic) Dušan Karol (Czech Republic) Jaroslav Pospíšil	7–6^{(6)}, 7–5
