= Jaroslav Pospíšil =

Czech tennis player

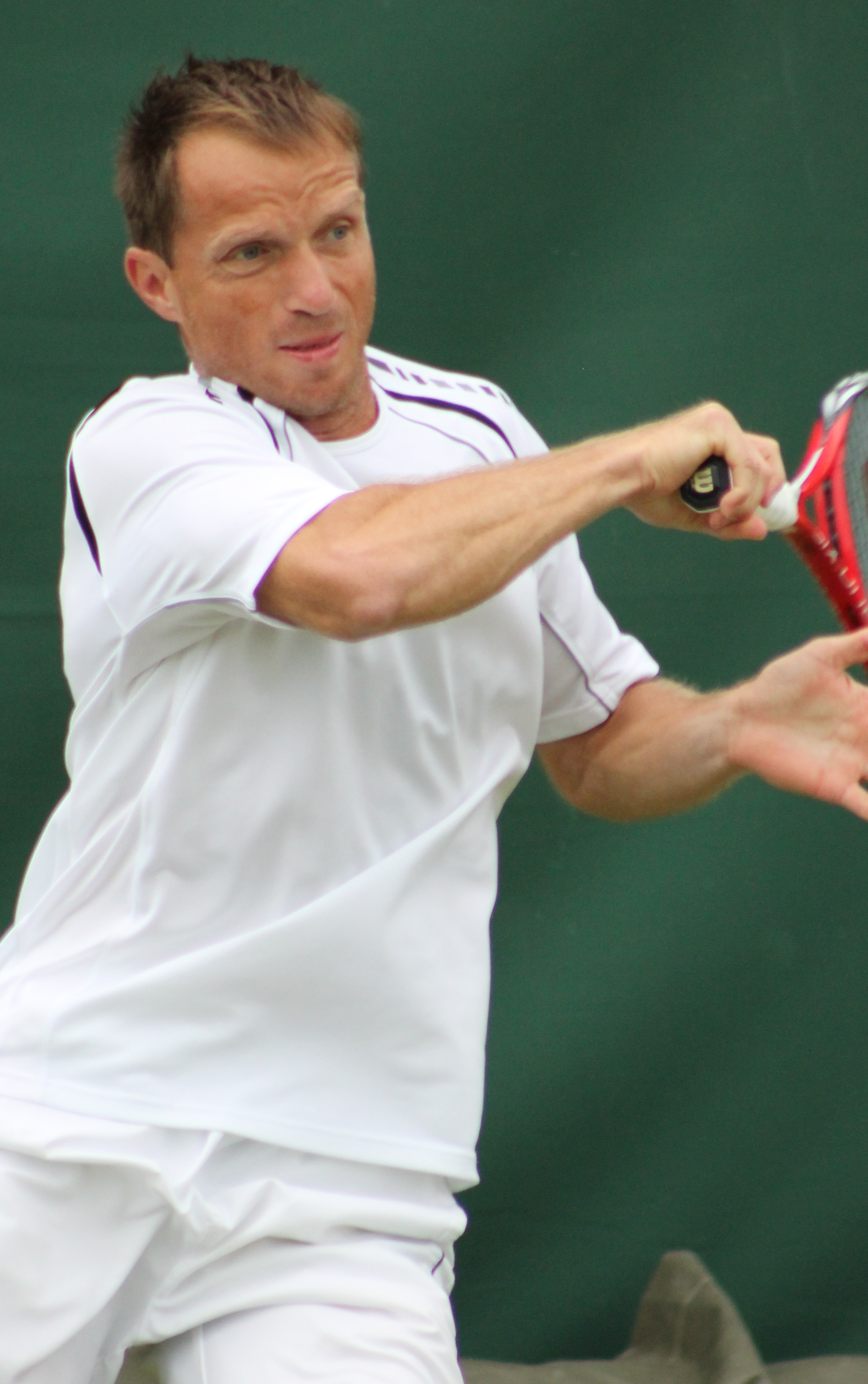
- Country (sports): Czech Republic
- Born: 9 February 1981 (age 45) Prostějov, Czechoslovakia
- Height: 1.76 m (5 ft 9 1/2 in)
- Retired: 2024
- Plays: Right-handed
- Prize money: $569,738

Singles
- Career record: 1–7
- Career titles: 0
- Highest ranking: No. 103 (23 May 2011)

Grand Slam singles results
- Australian Open: Q3 (2011)
- French Open: Q2 (2011)
- Wimbledon: 1R (2011)
- US Open: Q1 (2004, 2008, 2010, 2014, 2015)

Doubles
- Career record: 5–4
- Career titles: 0
- Highest ranking: No. 115 (1 October 2012)
- Last updated on: 15 September 2024.

Jaroslav Pospíšil (Czech pronunciation: [ˈjaroslaf ˈpospiːʃɪl]; born 9 February 1981) is a Czech tennis coach and a former professional player who competed on the ITF Futures and ATP Challenger tours. On 23 May 2011 he reached his highest ATP singles ranking of world No. 103. On 1 October 2012, he reached his best doubles ranking of No. 115.

To date, Pospíšil has reached 53 singles finals on the ATP Challenger and ITF Futures tours, from which he has won 28 titles. On the same tours, he has won 64 doubles titles after reaching a total of 101 doubles finals.

== Career ==
Predominantly playing on the Challenger and Futures tours, Pospisil has made 7 main draw appearances on the ATP Tour, including the 2011 Wimbledon Championships as his only Grand Slam appearance.

His sole ATP win came at the ATP 250 level on the hard courts of the 2013 Erste Bank Open in Vienna, Austria, where despite losing in qualifying, he was granted entry to the tournament proper as a lucky loser and defeated France's Gaël Monfils in the first round, 7–6, 7–5. He was eliminated in the second round by Dominic Thiem.

== Coaching ==
In a coaching role, he hit with Caroline Wozniacki during the 2015 Wimbledon Championships and helped her prepare for her next opponents.

Towards the end of his playing career, he started coaching tennis, becoming the coach of Czech player Vít Kopřiva, although he continued entering some tournaments as a player in his own right too.

== Grand Slam performance timeline ==
Key
W	F	SF	QF	#R	RR	Q#	DNQ	A	NH

(W) winner; (F) finalist; (SF) semifinalist; (QF) quarterfinalist; (#R) rounds 4, 3, 2, 1; (RR) round-robin stage; (Q#) qualification round; (DNQ) did not qualify; (A) absent; (NH) not held; (SR) strike rate (events won / competed); (W–L) win–loss record.

=== Singles ===
Tournament	2004	2005-7	2008	2009	2010	2011	2012	2013	2014	2015	SR	W–L	Win %
Australian Open	A	A	A	Q1	A	Q3	Q1	A	Q1	A	0 / 0	0–0	–
French Open	A	A	A	Q1	A	Q2	A	A	Q1	Q1	0 / 0	0–0	–
Wimbledon	Q1	A	Q3	Q3	A	1R	A	A	Q1	Q1	0 / 1	0–1	0%
US Open	Q1	A	Q1	A	Q1	A	A	A	Q1	Q1	0 / 0	0–0	–
Win–loss	0–0	0–0	0–0	0–0	0–0	0–1	0–0	0–0	0–0	0–0	0 / 1	0–1	0%

== ATP Challenger and ITF Futures finals ==
=== Singles: 53 (28–25) ===
Legend (singles) ATP Challenger Tour (3–2) ITF Futures Tour (25–23)	Finals by surface Hard (6–9) Clay (22–14) Grass (0–1) Carpet (0–1)

Result	W–L	Date	Tournament	Tier	Surface	Opponent	Score
Win	1–0	Aug 2000	Egypt F3, Cairo	Futures	Clay	(Egypt) Amr Ghoneim	7–6^{(7–4)}, 5–7, 7–5
Loss	1–1	Aug 2003	Egypt F1, Cairo	Futures	Clay	(Bulgaria) Yordan Kanev	4–6, 6–7^{(4–7)}
Loss	1–2	Aug 2003	Egypt F2, Cairo	Futures	Clay	(Slovakia) Tomas Janci	6–7^{(5–7)}, 6–4, 6–7^{(6–8)}
Win	2–2	Aug 2003	Egypt F3, Cairo	Futures	Clay	(Egypt) Karim Maamoun	4–6, 6–3, 6–4
Win	3–2	Sep 2003	Rwanda F1, Kigali	Futures	Clay	(South Africa) Willem-Petrus Meyer	7-6^{(7–5)}, 6–1
Loss	3–3	Oct 2003	Rwanda F2, Kigali	Futures	Clay	(South Africa) Wesley Whitehouse	4–6, 6–4, 5–7
Win	4–3	Nov 2003	Sri Lanka F2, Colombo	Futures	Clay	(South Korea) Young-Jun Kim	7-6^{(7–4)}, 6–3
Loss	4–4	Feb 2004	Spain F4, Murcia	Futures	Clay	(Spain) Didac Perez-Minarro	3–6, 6–7^{(0–7)}
Win	5–4	May 2004	Algeria F1, Algiers	Futures	Clay	(Algeria) Slimane Saoudi	4–6, 6–4, 2–0 ret.
Win	6–4	Jul 2005	Austria F5, Anif	Futures	Clay	(Austria) Johannes Ager	6–4, 2–6, 6–1
Win	7–4	Aug 2005	Slovakia F1, Žilina	Futures	Clay	(Italy) Stefano Ianni	2–6, 7–6^{(7–4)}, 6–4
Loss	7–5	Aug 2005	Hungary F4, Kaposvár	Futures	Clay	(Hungary) Kornél Bardóczky	5–7, 3–6
Win	8–5	Jun 2007	Czech Republic F4, Karlovy	Futures	Clay	(Czech Republic) Ladislav Chramosta	6–4, 2–0 ret.
Loss	8–6	Jun 2007	Germany F5, Ingolstadt	Futures	Clay	(Spain) Daniel Gimeno Traver	3–6, 3–6
Win	9–6	Nov 2007	Spain F40, Gran Canaria	Futures	Hard	(France) Mathieu Rodrigues	4–6, 7–6^{(7–0)}, 6–2
Win	10–6	May 2008	Czech Republic F3, Jablonec	Futures	Clay	(Czech Republic) Martin Vacek	6–3, 6–3
Win	11–6	Feb 2010	Egypt F1, Giza	Futures	Clay	(France) Axel Michon	6–2, 6–3
Win	12–6	Mar 2010	Croatia F1, Poreč	Futures	Clay	(Hungary) Attila Balázs	2–6, 6–3, 6–3
Win	13–6	May 2010	Czech Republic F3, Jablonec	Futures	Clay	(Czech Republic) Jan Mertl	7–5, 6–7^{(5–7)}, 6–4
Loss	13–7	Sep 2010	Brașov, Romania	Challenger	Clay	(France) Éric Prodon	6–7^{(1)}, 3–6
Win	14–7	Sep 2010	Trnava, Slovakia	Challenger	Clay	(Kazakhstan) Yuri Schukin	6–4, 4–6, 6–3
Loss	14–8	Oct 2010	Tarragona, Spain	Challenger	Clay	(Spain) Marcel Granollers	6–1, 5–7, 0–6
Win	15–8	Feb 2011	Mekoes, Morocco	Challenger	Clay	(Spain) Guillermo Olaso	6–1, 3–6, 6–3
Loss	15–9	May 2012	Czech Republic F3, Jablonec	Futures	Clay	(Slovakia) Andrej Martin	4–6, 2–6
Win	16–9	Aug 2012	Slovakia F3, Poprad	Futures	Clay	(Hungary) Márton Fucsovics	6–4, 7–5
Loss	16–10	Aug 2012	Austria F7, Pörtschach	Futures	Clay	(Italy) Riccardo Bellotti	1–6, 4–6
Loss	16–11	Oct 2012	Croatia F10, Solin	Futures	Clay	(Slovakia) Andrej Martin	2–6, 2–6
Loss	16–12	Oct 2012	Croatia F12, Dubrovnik	Futures	Clay	(Czech Republic) Dušan Lojda	2–6, 3–6
Win	17–12	Mar 2013	Croatia F4, Poreč	Futures	Clay	(Bulgaria) Tihomir Grozdanov	6–2, 6–1
Loss	17–13	May 2013	Czech Republic F2, Teplice	Futures	Clay	(Slovakia) Norbert Gombos	4–6, 2–6
Win	18–13	Sep 2013	Sibiu, Romania	Challenger	Clay	(Italy) Marco Cecchinato	4–6, 6–4, 6–1
Win	19–13	Mar 2014	Egypt F10, Sharm El Sheikh	Futures	Clay	(Egypt) Mohamed Safwat	6–1, 6–2
Win	20–13	Mar 2014	Egypt F11, Sharm El Sheikh	Futures	Clay	(Spain) José Checa Calvo	6–2, 6–2
Loss	20–14	Nov 2014	Czech Republic F5, Opava	Futures	Grass	(Czech Republic) Jan Mertl	1–6, 1–6
Loss	20–15	Nov 2014	Egypt F34, Sharm El Sheikh	Futures	Hard	(Egypt) Mohamed Safwat	7–5, 3–6, 2–6
Loss	20–16	Feb 2015	Egypt F4, Sharm El Sheikh	Futures	Hard	(Austria) Dennis Novak	6–2, 3–6, 6–7^{(6–8)}
Loss	20–17	Feb 2015	Egypt F5, Sharm El Sheikh	Futures	Hard	(Austria) Dennis Novak	7–6^{(7–5)}, 3–6, 6–7^{(2–8)}
Win	21–17	Feb 2015	Egypt F6, Sharm El Sheikh	Futures	Hard	(Serbia) Nikola Milojević	6–4, 6–4
Loss	21–18	Mar 2015	Egypt F10, Sharm El Sheikh	Futures	Hard	(Egypt) Mohamed Safwat	3–6, 7–6^{(7–2)}, 0–5 ret.
Win	22–18	Mar 2015	Egypt F11, Sharm El Sheikh	Futures	Hard	(Egypt) Mohamed Safwat	6–7^{(6–8)}, 6–3, 7–6^{(7–5)}
Win	23–18	Apr 2015	Qatar F1, Doha	Futures	Hard	(Portugal) Rui Machado	6–0, 7–5
Win	24–18	Oct 2015	Egypt F33, Sharm El Sheikh	Futures	Hard	(France) Gleb Sakharov	3–6, 6–1, 6–0
Loss	24–19	Oct 2015	Egypt F34, Sharm El Sheikh	Futures	Hard	(France) Gleb Sakharov	2–6, ret.
Loss	24–20	Feb 2016	Egypt F6, Sharm El Sheikh	Futures	Hard	(Serbia) Marko Tepavac	4–6, 7–6^{(10–8)}, 5–7
Win	25–20	Apr 2016	Egypt F11, Sharm El Sheikh	Futures	Hard	(Italy) Andrea Vavassori	6–4, 6–4
Win	26–20	Sep 2016	Egypt F24, Cairo	Futures	Clay	(Czech Republic) Vít Kopřiva	7–5, 6–4
Win	27–20	Oct 2016	Egypt F26, Cairo	Futures	Clay	(Bolivia) Federico Zeballos	6–3, 3–6, 6–1
Win	28–20	Oct 2016	Croatia F11, Bol	Futures	Clay	(Italy) Riccardo Bellotti	6-3, ret.
Loss	28–21	Feb 2018	Egypt F4, Sharm El Sheikh	Futures	Hard	(Italy) Gianluigi Quinzi	2–6, 4–6
Loss	28–22	Mar 2018	Egypt F10, Sharm El Sheikh	Futures	Hard	(Russia) Roman Safiullin	1–6, 1–6
Loss	28–23	Apr 2018	Turkey F14, Antalya	Futures	Clay	(Croatia) Nino Serdarušić	2–6, 6–2, 3–6
Loss	28–24	Oct 2019	M25 Olomouc, Czech Republic	World Tennis Tour	Carpet	(Czech Republic) Robin Stanek	3–6, 4–6
Loss	28–25	Mar 2020	M15 Sharm El Sheikh, Egypt	World Tennis Tour	Hard	(Italy) Luca Nardi	7–5, 4–6, 6–7^{(5–7)}

=== Doubles: 101 (64–37) ===
Legend (doubles) ATP Challenger Tour (13–11) ITF Futures Tour (51–26)	Finals by surface Hard (11–7) Clay (51–23) Grass (1–0) Carpet (1–7)

Result	W–L	Date	Tournament	Tier	Surface	Partner	Opponents	Score
Loss	0–1	May 2001	Czech Republic F1, Most	Futures	Clay	(Czech Republic) Tomas Matejka	(Czech Republic) Martin Bartonek (Czech Republic) Petr Dezort	1–6, 1–6
Win	1–1	Aug 2001	Egypt F1, Cairo	Futures	Clay	(Czech Republic) Michal Navrátil	(Egypt) Marwan Zewar (Egypt) Karim Maamoun	6–3, 6–3
Win	2–1	Aug 2001	Egypt F2, Cairo	Futures	Clay	(Czech Republic) Michal Navrátil	(Greece) Alexandros Jakupovic (Greece) Nikos Rovas	6–2, 6–2
Loss	2–2	Jun 2002	Czech Republic F3, Karlovy	Futures	Clay	(Czech Republic) Jiri Vencl	(Czech Republic) Jakub Hasek (Czech Republic) Josef Neštický	2–6, 3–6
Loss	2–3	Aug 2002	Egypt F3, Al Maadi	Futures	Clay	(Czech Republic) Dušan Karol	(Slovakia) Tomas Janci (Slovakia) Michal Varsanyi	1–6, 2–6
Win	3–3	Sep 2002	Czech Republic F4, Přerov	Futures	Clay	(Czech Republic) Pavel Šnobel	(Italy) Diego Álvarez (Italy) Nahuel Fracassi	6–2, 7–5
Loss	3–4	Oct 2002	Cuba F1, Havana	Futures	Hard	(Czech Republic) Dušan Karol	(Italy) Gianluca Bazzica (Canada) Michal Ciszek	6–7^{(6–8)}, 5–7
Win	4–4	Nov 2002	Netherlands Antilles F1, Curaçao	Futures	Hard	(Czech Republic) Dušan Karol	(Netherlands) Sander Groen (Netherlands) Melvyn op der Heijde	3–6, 6–2, 6–4
Win	5–4	Dec 2002	Aruba F1, Oranjestad	Futures	Hard	(Czech Republic) Dušan Karol	(United States) Keith From (United States) Mirko Pehar	7–5, 7-6^{(7–4)}
Loss	5–5	Dec 2002	Czech Republic F10, Ostrava	Futures	Hard	(Czech Republic) Jiri Vencl	(Poland) Mariusz Fyrstenberg (Poland) Łukasz Kubot	6–2, 3–6, 4–6
Win	6–5	May 2003	Algeria F2, Algiers	Futures	Clay	(Czech Republic) Dušan Karol	(Spain) David Cors-Pares (Spain) Gabriel Trujillo Soler	7–5, 7-6^{(9–7)}
Win	7–5	May 2003	Algeria F3, Algiers	Futures	Clay	(Czech Republic) Dušan Karol	(Spain) Miquel Perez Puigdomenech (Spain) Gabriel Trujillo Soler	walkover
Win	8–5	Jun 2003	Serbia & Montenegro F3, Belgrade	Futures	Clay	(Hungary) Kornél Bardóczky	(Federal Republic of Yugoslavia) Aleksander Slovic (United States) Mirko Pehar	6–0, 6–4
Win	9–5	Jul 2003	Georgia F1, Tbilisi	Futures	Clay	(Czech Republic) Radim Žitko	(Russia) Mikhail Elgin (Ukraine) Orest Tereshchuk	1–6, 7–5, 7–5
Win	10–5	Aug 2003	Egypt F2, Cairo	Futures	Clay	(Czech Republic) Michal Navrátil	(Japan) Atsuo Ogawa (Japan) Tetsuhiro Yamamoto	6–4, 6–4
Loss	10–6	Aug 2003	Egypt F3, Cairo	Futures	Clay	(Czech Republic) Martin Schulhauser	(Slovakia) Tomas Janci (Slovakia) Michal Varsanyi	6–3, 3–6, 4–6
Win	11–6	Sep 2003	Rwanda F1, Kigali	Futures	Clay	(Czech Republic) Dušan Karol	(South Africa) Willem-Petrus Meyer (South Africa) Wesley Whitehouse	6–4, 7–6^{(7–1)}
Win	12–6	Oct 2003	Rwanda F2, Kigali	Futures	Clay	(Czech Republic) Dušan Karol	(South Africa) Willem-Petrus Meyer (South Africa) Wesley Whitehouse	walkover
Win	13–6	Nov 2003	Sri Lanka F2, Colombo	Futures	Clay	(Czech Republic) Dušan Karol	(Slovakia) Boris Borgula (Czech Republic) Roman Vögeli	walkover
Win	14–6	May 2004	Algeria F2, Algiers	Futures	Clay	(Czech Republic) Dušan Karol	(Algeria) Noujeim Hakimi (Algeria) Abdelhak Hameurlaine	6–4, 6–0
Loss	14–7	Nov 2004	Prague, Czech Republic	Challenger	Carpet	(Czech Republic) Jan Minar	(Czech Republic) Lukáš Dlouhý (Slovakia) Igor Zelenay	3–6, 6–3, 6–7^{(5–7)}
Loss	14–8	Feb 2005	Austria F3, Salzburg	Futures	Carpet	(Czech Republic) Radim Žitko	(Germany) Lars Uebel (Switzerland) Roman Valent	2–6, 6-7^{(2–7)}
Win	15–8	Mar 2005	Morocco F1, Oujda	Futures	Clay	(Germany) Ivo Klec	(Switzerland) Fabian Roetschi (Switzerland) Jean-Claude Scherrer	6–4, 6–4
Win	16–8	Apr 2005	Morocco F2, Rabat	Futures	Clay	(Germany) Ivo Klec	(Poland) Adam Chadaj (Poland) Filip Urban	6–2, 3–6, 6–4
Win	17–8	Aug 2005	Slovakia F1, Žilina	Futures	Clay	(Slovakia) Adrian Sikora	(Czech Republic) Daniel Lustig (Czech Republic) Lukáš Rosol	6–2, 3–6, 6–0
Win	18–8	Sep 2005	Croatia F6, Mali Lošinj	Futures	Clay	(Slovakia) Boris Borgula	(Croatia) Gordan Peranec (Spain) Carlos Rexach-Itoiz	6–4, 6–3
Win	19–8	Apr 2006	Bergamo, Italy	Challenger	Clay	(Czech Republic) Jan Hájek	(Argentina) Marcelo Charpentier (Italy) Tomas Tenconi	6–2, 6–2
Win	20–8	May 2006	Ostrava, Czech Republic	Challenger	Clay	(Czech Republic) Pavel Šnobel	(Germany) Philipp Marx (Germany) Torsten Popp	6–4, 6–7^{(3–7)}, [10–6]
Loss	20–9	Dec 2006	Czech Republic F5, Opava	Futures	Carpet	(Czech Republic) Roman Vögeli	(Czech Republic) Lukáš Rosol (Slovakia) Igor Zelenay	6–4, 2–6, 1–6
Win	21–9	Feb 2007	Croatia F2, Zagreb	Futures	Hard	(Czech Republic) Jan Vacek	(Croatia) Nikola Mektić (Croatia) Vedran Siljegovic	6–3, 4–6, 6–3
Loss	21–10	Mar 2007	Croatia F4, Vrsar	Futures	Clay	(Czech Republic) Jan Masik	(Russia) Mikhail Elgin (Russia) Alexander Krasnorutskiy	5–7, 0–6
Loss	21–11	Apr 2007	Croatia F5, Rovinj	Futures	Clay	(Slovenia) Blaž Kavčič	(Croatia) Nikola Martinovic (Croatia) Joško Topić	3–6, 3–6
Win	22–11	May 2007	Czech Republic F3, Jablonec	Futures	Clay	(Czech Republic) Jan Masik	(Canada) Érik Chvojka (Mexico) Bruno Rodríguez	7–5, 7–5
Win	23–11	Jun 2007	Czech Republic F4, Karlovy	Futures	Clay	(Czech Republic) Dušan Karol	(Czech Republic) Karel Luhan (Czech Republic) Jiri Novy	6–1, 6–4
Win	24–11	Jun 2007	Germany F5, Ingolstadt	Futures	Clay	(Austria) Martin Slanar	(Canada) Érik Chvojka (Czech Republic) Filip Zeman	7–5, 6–4
Loss	24–12	Aug 2007	Samarkand, Uzbekistan	Challenger	Clay	(Czech Republic) Adam Vejmelka	(Ukraine) Sergey Bubka (Russia) Evgeny Kirillov	3–6, 2–6
Win	25–12	Sep 2007	Germany F17, Nuremberg	Futures	Clay	(Czech Republic) Dušan Karol	(Germany) Philipp Piyamongko (Germany) Peter Steinberger	6–4, 6–4
Win	26–12	Sep 2007	Bosnia & Herzegovina F5, Mostar	Futures	Clay	(Slovenia) Blaž Kavčič	(Netherlands) Matwé Middelkoop (Italy) Francesco Piccari	4–6, 6–3, [10–5]
Win	27–12	Nov 2007	Spain F40, Gran Canaria	Futures	Hard	(Czech Republic) Dušan Karol	(Spain) Luis-Antonio Perez-Perez (Spain) Sergio Perez-Perez	7–5, 6–4
Loss	27–13	Nov 2007	Spain F41, Gran Canaria	Futures	Clay	(Czech Republic) Dušan Karol	(Greece) Alexandros Jakupovic (Spain) Carles Poch Gradin	3–6, 2–6
Loss	27–14	Mar 2008	Croatia F4, Rovinj	Futures	Clay	(Czech Republic) Roman Vögeli	(Switzerland) Michael Lammer (Italy) Marco Pedrini	6–1, 6–7^{(5–7)}, [7–10]
Loss	27–15	Mar 2008	Croatia F5, Vrsar	Futures	Clay	(Czech Republic) Roman Vögeli	(Italy) Thomas Fabbiano (Italy) Marco Pedrini	6–7^{(4–7)}, 6–4, [8–10]
Loss	27–16	May 2008	Prague, Czech Republic	Challenger	Clay	(Czech Republic) Dušan Karol	(Czech Republic) Lukáš Dlouhý (Czech Republic) Petr Pála	7–6^{(7–2)}, 4–6, [6–10]
Win	28–16	May 2008	Rijeka, Croatia	Challenger	Clay	(Czech Republic) Dušan Karol	(United States) Alex Kuznetsov (Belgium) Dick Norman	6–4, 6–4
Win	29–16	May 2008	Czech Republic F3, Jablonec	Futures	Clay	(Canada) Érik Chvojka	(United States) James Ludlow (Republic of Ireland) Colin O'Brien	6–4, 6–3
Win	30–16	Jul 2008	Oberstaufen, Germany	Challenger	Clay	(Czech Republic) Dušan Karol	(Brazil) André Ghem (Netherlands) Boy Westerhof	6–7^{(2–7)}, 6–1, [10–6]
Loss	30–17	Dec 2008	Czech Republic F6, Opava	Futures	Carpet	(Czech Republic) Jiří Školoudík	(United Kingdom) Colin Fleming (United Kingdom) Jonathan Marray	4–6, 2–6
Loss	30–18	Apr 2009	Monza, Italy	Challenger	Clay	(Czech Republic) Dušan Karol	(United Kingdom) James Auckland (United States) Travis Rettenmaier	5–7, 7–6^{(8–6)}, [4–10]
Win	31–18	Aug 2009	Germany F12, Dortmund	Futures	Clay	(France) Alexandre Renard	(Argentina) Juan-Martín Aranguren (United States) Rylan Rizza	6–4, 4–6, [10–4]
Win	32–18	Oct 2009	Egypt F14, Cairo	Futures	Clay	(Slovenia) Andrej Martin	(Germany) Alexander Flock (Germany) Gero Kretschmer	3–6, 6–2, [10–6]
Loss	32–19	Nov 2009	Czech Republic F4, Roznov	Futures	Carpet	(Czech Republic) Pavel Šnobel	(Russia) Denis Matsukevich (Poland) Dawid Olejniczak	3–6, 4–6
Loss	32–20	Nov 2009	Czech Republic F5, Opava	Futures	Carpet	(Czech Republic) Pavel Šnobel	(Czech Republic) Roman Jebavý (Slovakia) Andrej Martin	6–7^{(5–7)}, 4–6
Win	33–20	Sep 2011	Trnava, Slovakia	Challenger	Clay	(Australia) Colin Ebelthite	(Belarus) Alialsandr Bury (Belarus) Andrei Vasilevski	6–3, 6–4
Win	34–20	Oct 2011	Rio, Brazil	Challenger	Clay	(Portugal) Fred Gil	(Brazil) Franco Ferreiro (Spain) Rubén Ramírez Hidalgo	6–4, 6–4
Loss	34–21	Nov 2011	Buenos Aires, Argentina	Challenger	Clay	(Uruguay) Marcel Felder	(Argentina) Carlos Berlocq (Argentina) Eduardo Schwank	7–6^{(7–1)}, 4–6, [7–10]
Win	35–21	Feb 2012	Meknes, Morocco	Challenger	Clay	(Spain) Adrián Menéndez Maceiras	(Spain) Gerard Granollers Pujol (Spain) Iván Navarro	6–3, 3–6, [10–8]
Win	36–21	May 2012	Czech Republic F2, Most	Futures	Clay	(Czech Republic) Jiří Veselý	(Canada) Érik Chvojka (Czech Republic) Marek Michalička	6–1, 6–4
Win	37–21	May 2012	Czech Republic F3, Jablonec	Futures	Clay	(Czech Republic) Jiří Veselý	(Australia) Peter Luczak (Australia) Blake Mott	7–5, 6–4
Win	38–21	Jul 2012	Czech Republic F6, Liberec	Futures	Clay	(Czech Republic) Jan Šátral	(Czech Republic) Tomáš Cakl (Czech Republic) Lubomir Majsajdr	6–2, 6–4
Loss	38–22	Sep 2012	Como, Italy	Challenger	Clay	(Australia) Colin Ebelthite	(Germany) Philipp Marx (Romania) Florin Mergea	4–6, 6–4, [4–10]
Loss	38–23	Sep 2012	Banja Luka, Bosnia & Herzegovina	Challenger	Clay	(Australia) Colin Ebelthite	(Croatia) Marin Draganja (Croatia) Lovro Zovko	1–6, 1–6
Loss	38–24	Sep 2012	Madrid, Spain	Challenger	Clay	(Australia) Colin Ebelthite	(Spain) Daniel Gimeno Traver (Spain) Iván Navarro	2–6, 6–4, [7–10]
Loss	38–25	Oct 2012	Croatia F10, Solin	Futures	Clay	(Slovenia) Andrej Martin	(Croatia) Mate Delić (Croatia) Tomislav Draganja	3–6, 6–4, [9–11]
Win	39–25	Feb 2013	Croatia F2, Zagreb	Futures	Hard	(Austria) Martin Fischer	(Croatia) Marin Draganja (Croatia) Nikola Mektić	4–6, 6–2, [10–6]
Win	40–25	Jun 2013	Austria F1, Seefeld	Futures	Clay	(Czech Republic) Jan Kuncik	(Austria) Sebastian Bader (United States) Erik Elliott	6-3, 6–4
Win	41–25	Jul 2013	Czech Republic F4, Prostějov	Futures	Clay	(Czech Republic) Michal Konecny	(Czech Republic) Jan Kuncik (Czech Republic) Robert Rumler	6–2, 6–7^{(4–7)}, [10–7]
Win	42–25	Aug 2013	Austria F8, Pörtschach	Futures	Clay	(Czech Republic) Sebastian Wagner	(Austria) Lukas Jastraunig (Austria) Tristan-Samuel Weissborn	6-2, 7-6^{(7–4)}
Win	43–25	Sep 2013	Brașov, Romania	Challenger	Clay	(Ukraine) Oleksandr Nedovyesov	(Romania) Teodor-Dacian Crăciun (Romania) Petru-Alexandru Luncanu	6–3, 6–1
Loss	43–26	Sep 2013	Trnava, Slovakia	Challenger	Clay	(Slovenia) Aljaž Bedene	(Croatia) Marin Draganja (Croatia) Mate Pavić	5–7, 6–4, [6–10]
Win	44–26	Apr 2014	Mersin, Turkey	Challenger	Clay	(Moldova) Radu Albot	(Italy) Thomas Fabbiano (Italy) Matteo Viola	7–6^{(9–7)}, 6–1
Win	45–26	Jun 2014	Marburg, Germany	Challenger	Clay	(Croatia) Franko Škugor	(Argentina) Diego Schwartzman (Argentina) Horacio Zeballos	6–4, 6–4
Win	46–26	Aug 2014	Liberec, Czech Republic	Challenger	Clay	(Czech Republic) Roman Jebavý	(Philippines) Ruben Gonzales (United Kingdom) Sean Thornley	6–4, 6–3
Loss	46–27	Sep 2014	Banja Luka, Bosnia & Herzegovina	Challenger	Clay	(Slovakia) Adrian Sikora	(Croatia) Dino Marcan (Croatia) Antonio Šančić	5–7, 4–6
Win	47–27	Sep 2014	Trnava, Slovakia	Challenger	Clay	(Czech Republic) Roman Jebavý	(Netherlands) Stephan Fransen (Netherlands) Robin Haase	6–4, 6–2
Win	48–27	Nov 2014	Czech Republic F5, Opava	Futures	Grass	(Czech Republic) Jan Šátral	(Romania) Patrick Grigoriu (Romania) Costin Pavăl	7–6^{(7–4)}, 6–3
Loss	48–28	Nov 2014	Egypt F34, Sharm El Sheikh	Futures	Hard	(Czech Republic) Dominik Kellovský	(Czech Republic) Libor Salaba (Czech Republic) Jan Šátral	4-6, 4–6
Win	49–28	Feb 2015	Egypt F5, Sharm El Sheikh	Futures	Hard	(Czech Republic) Dominik Kellovský	(Egypt) Sherif Sabry (Germany) George Von Massow	6-4, 6–4
Win	50–28	Mar 2015	Egypt F10, Sharm El Sheikh	Futures	Hard	(Czech Republic) Roman Jebavý	(Czech Republic) Libor Salaba (Czech Republic) Jan Šátral	6-4, 6–3
Win	51–28	Mar 2015	Egypt F11, Sharm El Sheikh	Futures	Hard	(Czech Republic) Roman Jebavý	(Czech Republic) Libor Salaba (Czech Republic) Jan Šátral	6-4, 6–2
Loss	51–29	Apr 2015	Qatar F1, Doha	Futures	Hard	(Czech Republic) Dominik Kellovský	(United Kingdom) James Marsalek (United Kingdom) David Rice	6–4, 4–6, [4–10]
Win	52–29	Apr 2015	Qatar F2, Doha	Futures	Hard	(Czech Republic) Dominik Kellovský	(Slovakia) Patrik Fabian (Belgium) Jonas Merckx	6–1, 2–6, [12–10]
Loss	52–30	Sep 2015	Banja Luka, Bosnia & Herzegovina	Challenger	Clay	(Czech Republic) Jan Šátral	(Serbia) Ilija Bozoljac (Italy) Flavio Cipolla	2–6, 5–7
Win	53–30	Mar 2016	Egypt F7, Sharm El Sheikh	Futures	Hard	(Czech Republic) Dominik Kellovský	(Belgium) Sander Gillé (Belgium) Joran Vliegen	3–6, 6–3, [13–11]
Win	54–30	Apr 2016	Egypt F11, Sharm El Sheikh	Futures	Hard	(Czech Republic) Petr Hájek	(United States) Anderson Reed (South Africa) Tucker Vorster	7–6^{(7–4)}, 7–5
Loss	54–31	Apr 2016	Egypt F12, Sharm El Sheikh	Futures	Hard	(Czech Republic) Petr Hájek	(United States) Anderson Reed (South Africa) Tucker Vorster	7–6^{(7–3)}, 2–6, [5–10]
Win	55–31	Sep 2016	Egypt F25, Cairo	Futures	Clay	(Czech Republic) Vít Kopřiva	(Argentina) Gaston-Arturo Grimolizzi (Argentina) Mateo Nicolas Martinez	6-3, 7-6^{(7–5)}
Win	56–31	Jul 2017	Czech Republic F5, Pardubice	Futures	Clay	(Czech Republic) Vít Kopřiva	(Croatia) Ivan Sabanov (Croatia) Matej Sabanov	4–6, 6–1, [10–2]
Win	57–31	Aug 2017	Serbia F3, Subotica	Futures	Clay	(Czech Republic) Vít Kopřiva	(Austria) Dennis Novak (Austria) Thomas Statzberger	6–2, 3–6, [10–6]
Loss	57–32	Mar 2018	Egypt F9, Sharm El Sheikh	Futures	Hard	(Austria) Alexander Erler	(Guatemala) Wilfredo Gonzalez (Zimbabwe) Benjamin Lock	3-6, 4–6
Win	58–32	Apr 2018	Turkey F13, Antalya	Futures	Clay	(Czech Republic) Vít Kopřiva	(Argentina) Sebastián Báez (Argentina) Juan Pablo Paz	6-2, 6–0
Loss	58–33	Sep 2018	Serbia F4, Subotica	Futures	Clay	(Czech Republic) Vít Kopřiva	(Croatia) Ivan Sabanov (Croatia) Matej Sabanov	2-6, 1–6
Win	59–33	Oct 2018	Turkey F31, Antalya	Futures	Clay	(Czech Republic) Vít Kopřiva	(Turkey) Mert Naci Turker (Turkey) Gokberk Ergeneman	6–0, 4–6, [10–2]
Win	60–33	Nov 2018	Czech Republic F8, Opava	Futures	Carpet	(Czech Republic) Vít Kopřiva	(Poland) Karol Drzewiecki (Poland) Szymon Walków	7–6^{(7–5)}, 6–4
Win	61–33	Dec 2018	Egypt F30, Cairo	Futures	Clay	(Czech Republic) Vít Kopřiva	(Switzerland) Louroi Martinez (Switzerland) Damien Wenger	6-2, 6–2
Win	62–33	Apr 2019	M15 Cairo, Egypt	World Tennis Tour	Clay	(Czech Republic) Vít Kopřiva	(Russia) Alexander Igoshin (Portugal) Bernardo Saraiva	7–6^{(10–8)}, 4–6, [10–6]
Loss	62–34	May 2019	M15 Prague, Czech Republic	World Tennis Tour	Clay	(Czech Republic) Vít Kopřiva	(Czech Republic) Filip Duda (Czech Republic) Marek Gengel	1-6, 5–7
Win	63–34	Jun 2019	M25 Pardubice, Czech Republic	World Tennis Tour	Clay	(Czech Republic) Vít Kopřiva	(Tunisia) Aziz Dougaz (France) Manuel Guinard	6-4, 6–2
Loss	63–35	Aug 2019	M25 Vogau, Austria	World Tennis Tour	Clay	(Czech Republic) Vít Kopřiva	(Czech Republic) Jonáš Forejtek (Czech Republic) Jan Mertl	4-6, 5–7
Loss	63–36	Nov 2019	M15 Opava, Czech Republic	World Tennis Tour	Carpet	(Czech Republic) Vít Kopřiva	(Netherlands) Niels Lootsma (Czech Republic) Petr Nouza	3-6, 6-7^{(3–7)}
Loss	63–37	Nov 2019	M15 Prague, Czech Republic	World Tennis Tour	Hard	(Czech Republic) Vít Kopřiva	(Czech Republic) Marek Gengel (Czech Republic) Michael Vrbenský	6–2, 3–6, [6–10]
Win	64–37	Sep 2022	Braga, Portugal	Challenger	Clay	(Czech Republic) Vít Kopřiva	(India) Jeevan Nedunchezhiyan (Indonesia) Christopher Rungkat	3–6, 6–3, [10–4]
