= Jeroen Masson =

Belgian tennis player

- Country (sports): Belgium
- Born: 2 January 1981 (age 44); Ghent, Belgium
- Plays: Right-handed
- Prize money: $113,066

Singles
- Highest ranking: No. 215 (10 Oct 2005)

Grand Slam singles results
- French Open: Q2 (2005)
- Wimbledon: Q2 (2005)
- US Open: Q1 (2005)

Doubles
- Highest ranking: No. 265 (17 Apr 2006)

Jeroen Masson (born 2 January 1981) is a Belgian former professional tennis player.

Although born in Belgium, Masson was raised in South Africa and comes from a family of bakers. In order to embark on a career in professional tennis he returned to his birth country at the age of 18 and became a Belgian national. He reached a best singles world ranking of 215, had a win over Novak Djokovic (in 2004), won 13 ITF Futures titles and was runner-up at the 2005 Belgrade Challenger. In 2009 he announced his retirement from the tour.

== ATP Challenger/ITF Futures finals ==
=== Singles: 25 (13–12) ===
Legend
ATP Challenger (0–1)
ITF Futures (13–11)

Result	W–L	Date	Tournament	Tier	Surface	Opponent	Score
Win	1–0	Feb 2001	France F5, Bressuire	Futures	Hard	(France) Jérôme Haehnel	7–6^{(8)}, 1–6, 6–4
Loss	1–1	Oct 2001	France F19, Sarreguemines	Futures	Carper	(France) Régis Lavergne	7–6^{(6)}, 4–6, 1–6
Loss	1–2	Apr 2002	Greece F1, Syros	Futures	Hard	(Switzerland) Marco Chiudinelli	7–6^{(5)}, 2–6, 4–6
Win	2–2	Jun 2002	Portugal F1, Lisbon	Futures	Clay	(Portugal) Bernardo Mota	6–4, 6–1
Win	3–2	Jul 2002	Turkey F1, Istanbul	Futures	Hard	(Germany) Bernard Parun	6–4, 6–2
Loss	3–3	Jul 2002	Turkey F2, Istanbul	Futures	Hard	(Bulgaria) Ivaylo Traykov	3–6, 4–6
Win	4–3	Aug 2002	Turkey F3, Istanbul	Futures	Hard	(Romania) Teodor-Dacian Crăciun	4–6, 6–2, 6–2
Win	5–3	Sep 2002	France F16, Mulhouse	Futures	Hard	(France) Lionel Roux	6–3, 5–7, 6–3
Loss	5–4	Feb 2004	Croatia F1, Zagreb	Futures	Hard	(Czech Republic) Pavel Šnobel	1–6, 1–6
Win	6–4	Mar 2004	Portugal F2, Albufeira	Futures	Hard	(Czech Republic) Ivo Minář	6–2, 6–3
Win	7–4	Mar 2004	Portugal F3, Lagos	Futures	Hard	(France) Gilles Simon	6–4, 6–4
Loss	7–5	Mar 2004	Greece F1, Athens	Futures	Hard	(United Kingdom) Andrew Banks	2–6, 7–6^{(7)}, 4–6
Win	8–5	Apr 2004	Germany F4, Riemerling	Futures	Clay	(Germany) Jan Mertl	7–5, 6–3
Loss	8–6	May 2004	Italy F7, Pavia	Futures	Clay	(Argentina) Andres Dellatorre	5–7, 3–6
Loss	8–7	Aug 2004	Netherlands F3, Enschede	Futures	Clay	(Slovakia) Ivo Klec	3–6, 1–6
Win	9–7	Nov 2004	Belgium F2, Sint-Katelijne-Waver	Futures	Hard	(United Kingdom) Richard Bloomfield	6–1, 6–1
Loss	0–1	Feb 2005	Belgrade Challenger, Serbia	Challenger	Carpet	(Belgium) Dick Norman	2–6, 3–6
Loss	9–8	Nov 2006	Spain F37, Las Palmas	Futures	Hard	(Russia) Andrey Golubev	4–6, 3–6
Win	10–8	Jan 2007	Germany F3, Kaarst	Futures	Carpet	(Germany) Ralph Grambow	6–2, 6–4
Win	11–8	Jan 2008	Germany F3, Kaarst	Futures	Carpet	(Belgium) Ruben Bemelmans	6–2, 4–6, 6–2
Loss	11–9	Feb 2008	Germany F5, Schwieberdingen	Futures	Carpet	(Germany) Simon Greul	4–6, 4–6
Win	12–9	Mar 2008	Morocco F1, Oujda	Futures	Clay	(Algeria) Lamine Ouahab	6–2, 3–0 ret.
Win	13–9	Mar 2008	Turkey F2, Antalya	Futures	Clay	(Romania) Gabriel Moraru	6–0, 7–6^{(2)}
Loss	13–10	Jun 2008	Germany F6, Ingolstadt	Futures	Clay	(Canada) Érik Chvojka	1–6, 7–5, 1–6
Loss	13–11	Aug 2008	Belgium F3, Brussels	Futures	Clay	(Denmark) Martin Killemose	5–7, 6–7^{(5)}
