= Dirk Stegmann =

South African tennis player

- Country (sports): South Africa
- Born: 8 March 1983 (age 42); Willowmore, South Africa
- Plays: Right-handed (two-handed backhand)
- Prize money: $27,926

Singles
- Career record: 0–0 (at ATP Tour level, Grand Slam level, and in Davis Cup)
- Career titles: 2 ITF
- Highest ranking: No. 341 (28 October 2002)

Doubles
- Career record: 0–0 (at ATP Tour level, Grand Slam level, and in Davis Cup)
- Career titles: 1 Challenger, 8 ITF
- Highest ranking: No. 170 (21 October 2002)

Dirk Stegmann (born 8 March 1983) is a former South African tennis player.

Stegmann has a career high ATP singles ranking of 341 achieved on 28 October 2002. He also has a career high ATP doubles ranking of 170 achieved on 21 October 2002.

Stegmann has 1 ATP Challenger Tour title at the 2002 Fergana Challenger.
