= Dušan Karol =

Czech tennis player (born 1983)

- Full name: Dušan Karol
- Country (sports): Czech Republic
- Born: 19 May 1983 (age 41); Jihlava, Czechoslovakia
- Plays: Right-handed
- Prize money: $90,450

Singles
- Highest ranking: No. 435 (27 September 2004)

Doubles
- Highest ranking: No. 128 (27 April 2009)

Dušan Karol (born 19 May 1983) is a former professional tennis player from the Czech Republic.

== Biography ==
Born in Jihlava, Karol was a right-handed player with a double-handed backhand.

As a junior, he achieved notable victories, including a win over Tomas Berdych at the Czech Indoor Championships and a match against Marcos Baghdatis where he didn't drop a game. His junior career peaked at number seven in the world doubles.

Transitioning to the professional circuit, Karol competed on the Challenger circuit and clinched four titles throughout his career, all in doubles. Beyond his playing days, he took on the role of coach for Czech player Markéta Vondroušová.

== Challenger titles ==
=== Doubles: (4) ===
No.	Year	Tournament	Surface	Partner	Opponents	Score
1.	2008	Rijeka, Croatia	Clay	(Czech Republic) Jaroslav Pospíšil	(United States) Alex Kuznetsov (Belgium) Dick Norman	6–4, 6–4
2.	2008	Oberstaufen, Germany	Clay	(Czech Republic) Jaroslav Pospíšil	(Brazil) André Ghem (Netherlands) Boy Westerhof	6–7^{(2)}, 6–1, 10–6
3.	2008	Tarragona, Spain	Clay	(Austria) Daniel Köllerer	(Spain) Marc Fornell Mestres (Spain) Marc López	6–2, 6–2
4.	2009	Freudenstadt, Germany	Clay	(Czech Republic) Jan Hájek	(Slovakia) Martin Kližan (Canada) Adil Shamasdin	4–6, 6–4, 10–5
