= 2003 Czech Indoor Open – Doubles =

Doubles
- 2003 Czech Indoor Open

Final
- Champion: (Czech Republic) Martin Štěpánek (Slovakia) Igor Zelenay
- Runner-up: (Germany) Karsten Braasch (Switzerland) Jean-Claude Scherrer
- Score: 6–4, 4–6, 6–4

Events
Singles	Doubles
- Czech Indoor Open

The 2003 Czech Indoor Open was a men's tennis tournament played on indoor hard courts in Průhonice, Czech Republic, and was part of the 2003 ATP Challenger Series.

This was the second edition of the event and was held from 17 to 23 November 2003.

Karol Beck and Jaroslav Levinský were the defending champions, the first decided not to participate in this edition, the second lost in quarterfinals.

Martin Štěpánek and Igor Zelenay won the title, defeating Karsten Braasch and Jean-Claude Scherrer 6–4, 4–6, 6–4 in the final.

== Seeds ==
1. (Czech Republic) Petr Luxa / (Czech Republic) David Škoch (quarterfinals)
2. (Czech Republic) Ota Fukárek / (Czech Republic) Jaroslav Levinský (quarterfinals)
3. (Poland) Mariusz Fyrstenberg / (Poland) Marcin Matkowski (first round)

== Draw ==
Key

- Q = Qualifier
- WC = Wild card
- LL = Lucky loser
- Alt = Alternate
- ITF = ITF entry
- PR = Protected ranking
- SR = Special ranking
- SE = Special exempt
- JE = Junior exempt
- JR = Junior Accelerator Programme entrant
- CO = College Accelerator Programme entrant
- NG = Next Gen Accelerator Program entrant
- w/o = Walkover
- r = Retired
- d = Defaulted

First round
1	(Czech Republic) Petr Luxa (Czech Republic) David Škoch	6	6
(Czech Republic) Nikola Krunt (Czech Republic) Jan Zelezny	2	4
(Czech Republic) Martin Štěpánek (Slovakia) Igor Zelenay	6	6
(Hungary) Kornel Bardoczky (Hungary) G Kisgyorgy	4	3
(Germany) Michael Berrer (Sweden) Johan Settergren	6	6
3	(Poland) M Fyrstenberg (Poland) Marcin Matkowski	4	4
(Chile) Paul Capdeville (Thailand) Danai Udomchoke	6	7
(Czech Republic) Jiří Vaněk (Czech Republic) Robin Vik	1	5
(Czech Republic) Lukáš Dlouhý (Czech Republic) Tomáš Zíb	4	6	6
(Czech Republic) L Chramosta (Czech Republic) Petr Dezort	6	3	4
(Czech Republic) David Novak (Czech Republic) Martin Vacek	6	4	6
(Czech Republic) Jan Minar (Czech Republic) Josef Nesticky	1	6	4
(Germany) Karsten Braasch (Switzerland) J-C Scherrer	6	7
(Czech Republic) Theodor Devoty (Czech Republic) Richard Drazny	4	6^{2}
2	(Czech Republic) Ota Fukárek (Czech Republic) J Levinský	7	7
(Czech Republic) Michal Navrátil (Czech Republic) Pavel Šnobel	5	6^{3}

Quarterfinals
1	(Czech Republic) Petr Luxa (Czech Republic) David Škoch	1	7	6^{1}
(Czech Republic) Martin Štěpánek (Slovakia) Igor Zelenay	6	6^{5}	7
(Germany) Michael Berrer (Sweden) Johan Settergren	6	7
(Chile) Paul Capdeville (Thailand) Danai Udomchoke	3	5
(Czech Republic) Lukáš Dlouhý (Czech Republic) Tomáš Zíb	6	6
(Czech Republic) David Novak (Czech Republic) Martin Vacek	1	3
(Germany) Karsten Braasch (Switzerland) J-C Scherrer	6	6^{5}	6
2	(Czech Republic) Ota Fukárek (Czech Republic) J Levinský	4	7	3

Semifinals
(Czech Republic) Martin Štěpánek (Slovakia) Igor Zelenay	6	6
(Germany) Michael Berrer (Sweden) Johan Settergren	3	3
(Czech Republic) Lukáš Dlouhý (Czech Republic) Tomáš Zíb	4	6^{2}
(Germany) Karsten Braasch (Switzerland) J-C Scherrer	6	7

Finals
(Czech Republic) Martin Štěpánek (Slovakia) Igor Zelenay	6	4	6
(Germany) Karsten Braasch (Switzerland) J-C Scherrer	4	6	4
