= 2003 Czech Indoor Open – Singles =

Singles
- 2003 Czech Indoor Open

Final
- Champion: (Switzerland) Marc Rosset
- Runner-up: (Belgium) Dick Norman
- Score: 7–6^{(7–4)}, 6^{(1–7)}–7, 7–6^{(7–3)}

Events
Singles	Doubles
- Czech Indoor Open

The 2003 Czech Indoor Open Open was a men's tennis tournament played on indoor hard courts in Průhonice, Czech Republic, and was part of the 2003 ATP Challenger Series.

It was the first edition of the tournament and was held from 17 to 23 November 2003.

Marc Rosset won in the final 7–6^{(7–4)}, 6^{(1–7)}–7, 7–6^{(7–3)}, against Dick Norman.

== Seeds ==
1. (Italy) Davide Sanguinetti (second round)
2. (Czech Republic) Tomáš Berdych (first round)
3. (Spain) Fernando Verdasco (first round)
4. (Netherlands) Dennis van Scheppingen (second round)
5. (Switzerland) Marc Rosset (champion)
6. (Denmark) Kenneth Carlsen (semifinals)
7. (Italy) Stefano Pescosolido (quarterfinals)

== Draw ==
Key

- Q = Qualifier
- WC = Wild card
- LL = Lucky loser
- Alt = Alternate
- ITF = ITF entry
- PR = Protected ranking
- SR = Special ranking
- SE = Special exempt
- JE = Junior exempt
- JR = Junior Accelerator Programme entrant
- CO = College Accelerator Programme entrant
- NG = Next Gen Accelerator Program entrant
- w/o = Walkover
- r = Retired
- d = Defaulted

=== Finals ===
Semifinals
5	(Switzerland) Marc Rosset	7	6^{4}	7
6	(Denmark) Kenneth Carlsen	6^{5}	7	6^{5}
(Belgium) Dick Norman	7	3	6
(Czech Republic) Jan Vacek	6^{2}	6	4

Final
5	(Switzerland) Marc Rosset	7	6^{1}	7
(Belgium) Dick Norman	6^{4}	7	6^{3}

=== Top half ===
First round
1	(Italy) D Sanguinetti	6	6^{6}	6
(Czech Republic) Ivo Minář	4	7	1
(Czech Republic) Bohdan Ulihrach	7	7
(Czech Republic) Martin Štěpánek	5	6^{6}
(Serbia) Janko Tipsarević	6	7
(Switzerland) M Kratochvil	2	5
5	(Switzerland) Marc Rosset	7	6
(Czech Republic) Tomáš Zíb	5	4
(Belgium) Gilles Elseneer	7	6
3	(Spain) F Verdasco	6^{8}	3
(Italy) G Galimberti	6	6
(Czech Republic) Nikola Krunt	0	0
(Australia) Paul Baccanello	6	6
(Switzerland) J-C Scherrer	3	4
6	(Denmark) Kenneth Carlsen	4	6	6
(Germany) Alexander Waske	6	3	4

Second round
1	(Italy) D Sanguinetti	4	0
(Czech Republic) Bohdan Ulihrach	6	6
(Serbia) Janko Tipsarević	4	0r
5	(Switzerland) Marc Rosset	6	1
(Belgium) Gilles Elseneer	6	6
(Italy) G Galimberti	3	2
(Australia) Paul Baccanello	4	4
6	(Denmark) Kenneth Carlsen	6	6

Quarterfinals
(Czech Republic) Bohdan Ulihrach	7	5	3
5	(Switzerland) Marc Rosset	5	7	6
(Belgium) Gilles Elseneer	6^{2}	4
6	(Denmark) Kenneth Carlsen	7	6

Semifinals
5	(Switzerland) Marc Rosset	7	6^{4}	7
6	(Denmark) Kenneth Carlsen	6^{5}	7	6^{5}

=== Bottom half ===
First round
7	(Italy) S Pescosolido	6	6
(Czech Republic) Pavel Šnobel	1	4
(Thailand) Danai Udomchoke	6	2
(Germany) Björn Phau	2	0r
(Belgium) Dick Norman	7	7
(Spain) Nicolás Almagro	6^{6}	6^{5}
4	(Netherlands) D van Scheppingen	6	6
(Czech Republic) Jan Zelezny	4	1
(United Kingdom) Arvind Parmar	6	6
(Czech Republic) Robin Vik	3	4
(Czech Republic) Jan Vacek	6	6
(Czech Republic) Jiří Vaněk	2	1
(Germany) Daniel Elsner	6	6
(Sweden) Johan Settergren	3	4
(Japan) Takao Suzuki	3	7	6
2	(Czech Republic) Tomáš Berdych	6	5	2

Second round
7	(Italy) S Pescosolido	6	0	6
(Thailand) Danai Udomchoke	4	6	3
(Belgium) Dick Norman	7	3	7
4	(Netherlands) D van Scheppingen	6^{5}	6	6^{8}
(United Kingdom) Arvind Parmar	6	5	5
(Czech Republic) Jan Vacek	4	7	7
(Germany) Daniel Elsner	2	3
(Japan) Takao Suzuki	6	6

Quarterfinals
7	(Italy) S Pescosolido	6^{5}	1
(Belgium) Dick Norman	7	6
(Czech Republic) Jan Vacek	7	6
(Japan) Takao Suzuki	6^{8}	3

Semifinals
(Belgium) Dick Norman	7	3	6
(Czech Republic) Jan Vacek	6^{2}	6	4
