= 2005 Zentiva Czech Indoor Open – Women's doubles =

Women's doubles
- 2005 Zentiva Czech Indoor Open

Final
- Champion: (Czech Republic) Lucie Hradecká (Czech Republic) Libuše Průšová
- Runner-up: (Czech Republic) Olga Vymetálková (Czech Republic) Eva Hrdinová
- Score: 6–3, 3–6, 6–3

Events
Singles	men	women
Doubles	men	women
- Czech Indoor Open

The 2005 Zentiva Czech Indoor Open was a women's tennis tournament played on indoor hard courts in Průhonice, Czech Republic. The event was part of the 2005 ITF Women's Circuit. It was the first edition of the tournament and it was held from 14 to 20 November 2005.

The final was played among Czech players, Lucie Hradecká and Libuše Průšová won the title defeating Olga Vymetálková and Eva Hrdinová in the final, 6–3, 3–6, 6–3.

== Seeds ==
1. (Czech Republic) Gabriela Chmelinová / (Czech Republic) Michaela Paštiková (quarterfinals)
2. (Czech Republic) Olga Vymetálková / (Czech Republic) Eva Hrdinová (finals)
3. (Croatia) Ivana Lisjak / (Czech Republic) Barbora Strýcová (quarterfinals)
4. (Slovakia) Stanislava Hrozenská / (Slovakia) Katarína Kachlíková (first round)

== Draw ==
Key

- Q = Qualifier
- WC = Wild card
- LL = Lucky loser
- Alt = Alternate
- ITF = ITF entry
- PR = Protected ranking
- SR = Special ranking
- SE = Special exempt
- JE = Junior exempt
- JR = Junior Accelerator Programme entrant
- CO = College Accelerator Programme entrant
- NG = Next Gen Accelerator Program entrant
- w/o = Walkover
- r = Retired
- d = Defaulted

=== Draw ===
First round
1	(Czech Republic) G Chmelinova (Czech Republic) M Paštiková	7	2
(Czech Republic) S Kleinová (Czech Republic) S Záhlavová	6^{5}	0^{r}
(Germany) A Barna (Ukraine) V Kapshay	2	3
(Czech Republic) L Hradecká (Czech Republic) L Prusova	6	6
4	(Slovakia) S Hrozenska (Slovakia) K Kachlíková	6	3	5
(Austria) D Kix (Austria) Y Meusburger Garamszegi	4	6	7
WC	(Slovakia) N Vajdova (Czech Republic) O Vrettas	4	2
Q	(Belarus) O Govortsova (Russia) E Grebenyuk	6	6
(Poland) A Radwańska (Russia) E Rodina	6	7
(Czech Republic) Nikola Fraňková (Czech Republic) A Sestini Hlaváčková	2	6^{5}
WC	(Czech Republic) K Kramperová (Czech Republic) K Vaňková	3	3
3	(Croatia) I Lisjak (Czech Republic) B Strýcová	6	6
WC	(Czech Republic) D Pavlikova (Czech Republic) E Valkova	1	2
(Germany) K Barrois (Germany) K Woerle-Scheller	6	6
(Luxembourg) M Minella (Germany) C Schneider	1	4
2	(Czech Republic) O Vymetálková (Czech Republic) E Hrdinová	6	6

Quarterfinals
1	(Czech Republic) G Chmelinová (Czech Republic) M Paštiková	1	3
(Czech Republic) L Hradecká (Czech Republic) L Prusova	6	6
(Austria) D Kix (Austria) Y Meusburger Garamszegi	6	6^{5}	6
Q	(Belarus) O Govortsova (Russia) E Grebenyuk	4	7	3
(Poland) A Radwańska (Russia) E Rodina	7	7
3	(Croatia) I Lisjak (Czech Republic) B Strýcová	5	5
(Germany) K Barrois (Germany) K Wörle-Scheller	3	3
2	(Czech Republic) O Vymetálková (Czech Republic) E Hrdinová	6	6

Semifinals
(Czech Republic) L Hradecká (Czech Republic) L Prusova	6	4	6
(Austria) D Kix (Austria) Y Meusburger Garamszegi	4	6	2
(Poland) A Radwańska (Russia) E Rodina	6	3	5
2	(Czech Republic) O Vymetálková (Czech Republic) E Hrdinová	4	6	7

Final
(Czech Republic) L Hradecká (Czech Republic) L Prusova	6	3	6
2	(Czech Republic) O Vymetálková (Czech Republic) E Hrdinová	3	6	3
