= 2005 Zentiva Czech Indoor Open – Women's singles =

Women's singles
- 2005 Zentiva Czech Indoor Open

Final
- Champion: (Czech Republic) Lucie Hradecká
- Runner-up: (Poland) Agnieszka Radwańska
- Score: 4–6, 6–1, 7–6^{(10–8)}

Events
Singles	men	women
Doubles	men	women
- Czech Indoor Open

The 2005 Zentiva Czech Indoor Open was a women's tennis tournament played on indoor hard courts in Průhonice, Czech Republic that was part of the 2005 ITF Women's Circuit. It was the first edition of the tournament and was held from 14 to 20 November 2005.

Lucie Hradecká won the title, defeating Agnieszka Radwańska in the final, 4–6, 6–1, 7–6^{(10–8)}.

== Seeds ==
1. (Croatia) Ivana Lisjak (first round)
2. (Austria) Yvonne Meusburger Garamszegi(second round)
3. (Czech Republic) Michaela Paštiková (quarterfinals)
4. (Czech Republic) Barbora Strýcová(second round)
5. (Czech Republic) Libuše Průšová (second round)
6. (Germany) Kathrin Wörle-Scheller (quarterfinals)
7. (Czech Republic) Sandra Kleinová (second round)
8. (Czech Republic) Olga Vymetálková (second round)

== Draw ==
Key

- Q = Qualifier
- WC = Wild card
- LL = Lucky loser
- Alt = Alternate
- ITF = ITF entry
- PR = Protected ranking
- SR = Special ranking
- SE = Special exempt
- JE = Junior exempt
- JR = Junior Accelerator Programme entrant
- CO = College Accelerator Programme entrant
- NG = Next Gen Accelerator Program entrant
- w/o = Walkover
- r = Retired
- d = Defaulted

=== Finals ===
Semifinals
(Czech Republic) L Hradecká	3	7	6
(Germany) K Barrois	6	5	4
LL	(Austria) D Kix	3	1
Q	(Poland) A Radwańska	6	6

Final
Q	(Poland) A Radwańska	6	1	6^{8}
(Czech Republic) L Hradecká	4	6	7

=== Top half ===
First round
1	(Croatia) I Lisjak	6	5	3
Q	(Russia) E Grebenyuk	2	7	6
(Czech Republic) S Záhlavová	5	4
LL	(Austria) D Kix	7	6
Q	(Czech Republic) D Sedenkova	1	3
Q	(Poland) J Sakowicz-Kostecka	6	6
(Czech Republic) N Ožegović	4	7	3
5	(Czech Republic) L Prusova	6	6^{10}	6
4	(Czech Republic) B Strýcová	7	6
Q	(Germany) A Roesch	6^{2}	3
Q	(Poland) A Radwańska	6	6
(Slovakia) D Nociarova	1	4
(Luxembourg) M Minella	7	6^{4}	1
(Slovakia) E Hrdinová	5	7	6
Q	(Slovakia) S Hrozenska	4	3
8	(Czech Republic) O Vymetalkova	6	6

Second round
Q	(Russia) E Grebenyuk	7	1	4
LL	(Austria) D Kix	6^{4}	6	6
Q	(Poland) J Sakowicz-Kostecka	7	6
5	(Czech Republic) L Prusova	5	4
4	(Czech Republic) B Strýcová	4	2
Q	(Poland) A Radwańska	6	6
(Slovakia) E Hrdinová	6	7
8	(Czech Republic) O Vymetalkova	3	5

Quarterfinals
LL	(Austria) D Kix	7	6
Q	(Poland) J Sakowicz-Kostecka	6^{2}	2
Q	(Poland) A Radwańska	6	3	6
(Slovakia) E Hrdinová	1	6	2

Semifinals
LL	(Austria) D Kix	3	1
Q	(Poland) A Radwańska	6	6

=== Bottom half ===
First round
7	(Czech Republic) S Kleinová	6	6
WC	(Czech Republic) K Kramperová	4	2
WC	(Czech Republic) N Fraňková	6	5	3
(Czech Republic) L Hradecká	4	7	6
(Germany) A Barna	6	6
WC	(Poland) E Valkova	4	1
Q	(Russia) E Rodina	4	4
3	(Czech Republic) M Paštiková	6	6
6	(Germany) K Woerle-Scheller	7	3	6
(Slovakia) K Kachlíková	6^{3}	6	1
Q	(Germany) J Ozga	6	6
JE	(Belarus) O Govortsova	3	2
(Hungary) R Kuti-Kis	1^{r}
(Germany) K Barrois	4
WC	(Czech Republic) D Pavlikova	1	1
2	(Austria) Y Meusburger Garamszegi	6	6

Second round
7	(Czech Republic) S Kleinová	6	1	5
(Czech Republic) L Hradecká	4	6	7
(Germany) A Barna	6	2	1
3	(Czech Republic) M Paštiková	3	6	6
6	(Germany) K Woerle-Scheller	6	6
Q	(Germany) J Ozga	4	4
(Germany) K Barrois	3	7	6
2	(Austria) Y Meusburger Garamszegi	6	6^{4}	4

Quarterfinals
(Czech Republic) L Hradecká	6	6
3	(Czech Republic) M Paštiková	3	4
6	(Germany) K Woerle-Scheller	6	2	4
(Germany) K Barrois	3	6	6

Semifinals
(Czech Republic) L Hradecká	3	7	6
(Germany) K Barrois	6	5	4
