= 2005 Zentiva Czech Indoor Open – Men's doubles =

Men's doubles
- 2005 Zentiva Czech Indoor Open

Final
- Champion: (Slovakia) Filip Polášek (Ukraine) Sergiy Stakhovsky
- Runner-up: (United Kingdom) James Auckland (Netherlands) Jasper Smit
- Score: 6–3, 3–6, 7–6^{(7–5)}

Events
Singles	men	women
Doubles	men	women
- Czech Indoor Open

The 2005 Zentiva Czech Indoor Open Open was a men's tennis tournament played on indoor hard courts in Průhonice, Czech Republic, and was part of the 2005 ATP Challenger Series.

This was the third edition of the event and was held from 22 to 27 November 2005.

Lukáš Dlouhý and Igor Zelenay were the defending champions. The first decided to not partake in this edition, the second lost in semifinals to the eventual champions.

Filip Polášek and Sergiy Stakhovsky won the title at their first ever participation in the tournament, defeating James Auckland and Jasper Smit in the final with the score 6–3, 3–6, 7–6^{(7–5)}, the same of previous edition final.

== Seeds ==
1. (United Kingdom) James Auckland / (Netherlands) Jasper Smit (final)
2. (Czech Republic) Pavel Šnobel / (Slovakia) Igor Zelenay (semifinals)
3. (Hungary) Gergely Kisgyorgy / (Ukraine) Orest Tereščuk (semifinals)
4. (Slovakia) Filip Polášek / (Ukraine) Sergiy Stakhovsky (champion)

== Draw ==
Key

- Q = Qualifier
- WC = Wild card
- LL = Lucky loser
- Alt = Alternate
- ITF = ITF entry
- PR = Protected ranking
- SR = Special ranking
- SE = Special exempt
- JE = Junior exempt
- JR = Junior Accelerator Programme entrant
- CO = College Accelerator Programme entrant
- NG = Next Gen Accelerator Program entrant
- w/o = Walkover
- r = Retired
- d = Defaulted

First round
1	(United Kingdom) James Auckland (Netherlands) Jasper Smit	6	6
(Poland) Tomasz Bednarek (Netherlands) Matwé Middelkoop	3	3
(Czech Republic) L Chramosta (Slovakia) Ladislav Švarc	7	6
(Israel) Amir Hadad (Czech Republic) Josef Nesticky	6^{3}	3
3	(Hungary) G Kisgyorgy (Ukraine) Orest Tereščuk	7	6
(Czech Republic) Jan Říha (Czech Republic) Pavel Riha	5	3
(Netherlands) Michel Koning (Netherlands) Steven Korteling	6	6
(Czech Republic) David Berka (Czech Republic) Martin Berka	1	2
(Czech Republic) Vaclav Kucera (Czech Republic) Jan Marek	6	7
(Czech Republic) Jan Minář (France) Nicolas Thomann	1	6^{6}
4	(Slovakia) Filip Polášek (Ukraine) Sergiy Stakhovsky	6	6
(Czech Republic) Roman Jebavý (Czech Republic) Jiri Kosler	2	3
(Czech Republic) Daniel Lustig (Czech Republic) Jan Mertl	7	6
(Germany) Daniel Elsner (Germany) J Herm-Zahlava	6^{3}	1
2	(Czech Republic) Pavel Šnobel (Slovakia) Igor Zelenay	6	6
(Romania) Adrian Ungur (Slovenia) Grega Žemlja	2	3

Quarterfinals
1	(United Kingdom) James Auckland (Netherlands) Jasper Smit	6	6
(Czech Republic) L Chramosta (Slovakia) Ladislav Švarc	3	1
3	(Hungary) G Kisgyorgy (Ukraine) Orest Tereščuk	W-O
(Netherlands) Michel Koning (Netherlands) Steven Korteling
(Czech Republic) Vaclav Kucera (Czech Republic) Jan Marek	7	3	3
4	(Slovakia) Filip Polášek (Ukraine) Sergiy Stakhovsky	5	6	6
(Czech Republic) Daniel Lustig (Czech Republic) Jan Mertl	3	2
2	(Czech Republic) Pavel Šnobel (Slovakia) Igor Zelenay	6	6

Semifinals
1	(United Kingdom) James Auckland (Netherlands) Jasper Smit	7	6
3	(Hungary) G Kisgyorgy (Ukraine) Orest Tereščuk	6^{6}	2
4	(Slovakia) Filip Polášek (Ukraine) Sergiy Stakhovsky	6	6
2	(Czech Republic) Pavel Šnobel (Slovakia) Igor Zelenay	1	2

Finals
1	(United Kingdom) James Auckland (Netherlands) Jasper Smit	3	6	6^{5}
4	(Slovakia) Filip Polášek (Ukraine) Sergiy Stakhovsky	6	3	7
