= 2005 Zentiva Czech Indoor Open – Men's singles =

Men's singles
- 2005 Zentiva Czech Indoor Open

Final
- Champion: (Netherlands) Raemon Sluiter
- Runner-up: (France) Nicolas Thomann
- Score: 6–3, 7–5

Events
Singles	men	women
Doubles	men	women
- Czech Indoor Open

The 2005 Zentiva Czech Indoor Open was a men's tennis tournament played on indoor hard courts in Průhonice, Czech Republic, and was part of the 2005 ATP Challenger Series.

This was the third edition of the event and was held from 22 to 27 November 2005.

Tuomas Ketola chose not to defend the title.

Raemon Sluiter won in the final 6–3, 7–5, against Nicolas Thomann.

== Seeds ==
1. (Italy) Daniele Bracciali (first round)
2. (Netherlands) Raemon Sluiter (champion)
3. (France) Grégory Carraz (quarterfinals)
4. (Slovakia) Michal Mertiňák (quarterfinals)
5. (Canada) Frédéric Niemeyer (first round)
6. (Ukraine) Sergiy Stakhovsky (semifinals)
7. (Kazakhstan) Evgeny Korolev (quarterfinals)
8. (Czech Republic) Tomáš Cakl (first round)

== Draw ==
Key

- Q = Qualifier
- WC = Wild card
- LL = Lucky loser
- Alt = Alternate
- ITF = ITF entry
- PR = Protected ranking
- SR = Special ranking
- SE = Special exempt
- JE = Junior exempt
- JR = Junior Accelerator Programme entrant
- CO = College Accelerator Programme entrant
- NG = Next Gen Accelerator Program entrant
- w/o = Walkover
- r = Retired
- d = Defaulted

=== Finals ===
Semifinals
6	(Ukraine) S Stakhovsky	3	1
(France) Nicolas Thomann	6	6
(United Kingdom) James Auckland	4	4
2	(Netherlands) Raemon Sluiter	6	6

Final
2	(Netherlands) Raemon Sluiter	6	7
(France) Nicolas Thomann	3	5

=== Top half ===
First round
(Czech Republic) Pavel Riha	6	6
1	(Italy) D Bracciali	1	2
(Czech Republic) Pavel Šnobel	7	6
(Netherlands) Steven Korteling	6^{5}	4
(Germany) J Herm-Zahlava	3	6	6
(Czech Republic) Jan Minar	6	3	4
6	(Ukraine) S Stakhovsky	7	7
(Czech Republic) Dušan Lojda	6^{4}	5
3	(France) Grégory Carraz	6	6^{5}	6
(Czech Republic) Jan Vacek	4	7	3
(Latvia) Ernests Gulbis	6	6
(Czech Republic) Roman Bicek	0	4
(Slovakia) Igor Zelenay	6	6
(United States) Kevin Mcduffee	4	3
(France) Nicolas Thomann	6	0
5	(Canada) F Niemeyer	0	1R

Second round
(Czech Republic) Pavel Riha	4	6^{9}
(Czech Republic) Pavel Šnobel	6	7
(Germany) J Herm-Zahlava	4	3
6	(Ukraine) S Stakhovsky	6	6
3	(France) Grégory Carraz	7	6
(Latvia) Ernests Gulbis	6^{4}	2
(Slovakia) Igor Zelenay	2	4
(France) Nicolas Thomann	6	6

Quarterfinals
(Czech Republic) Pavel Šnobel	3	6	3
6	(Ukraine) S Stakhovsky	6	3	6
3	(France) Grégory Carraz	6	3	4
(France) Nicolas Thomann	3	6	6

Semifinals
6	(Ukraine) S Stakhovsky	3	1
(France) Nicolas Thomann	6	6

=== Bottom half ===
First round
(United Kingdom) James Auckland	4	7	7
8	(Czech Republic) Tomáš Cakl	6	6^{2}	6^{8}
(Romania) Adrian Ungur	5	0
(Austria) Rainer Eitzinger	3	0R
(Netherlands) Michel Koning	6	6
(Czech Republic) Pavel Černý	1	3
4	(Slovakia) Michal Mertiňák	4	6	7
(Poland) Dawid Olejniczak	6	4	5
7	(Kazakhstan) Evgeny Korolev	6	6
(Czech Republic) Jan Mertl	4	3
(France) J-M Péquery	6	6
(Germany) Tobias Summerer	3	4
(Germany) Daniel Elsner	6	6
(Israel) Amir Hadad	2	2
2	(Netherlands) Raemon Sluiter	2	6	6
(Slovenia) Grega Žemlja	6	3	2

Second round
(United Kingdom) James Auckland	6	4	7
(Romania) Adrian Ungur	4	6	5
(Netherlands) Michel Koning	3	6	6^{4}
4	(Slovakia) Michal Mertiňák	6	4	7
7	(Kazakhstan) Evgeny Korolev	2	6	7
(France) J-M Péquery	6	4	6^{4}
(Germany) Daniel Elsner	7	6^{4}	4
2	(Netherlands) Raemon Sluiter	6^{8}	7	6

Quarterfinals
(United Kingdom) James Auckland	7	6
4	(Slovakia) Michal Mertiňák	6^{4}	3
7	(Kazakhstan) Evgeny Korolev
2	(Netherlands) Raemon Sluiter	W-O

Semifinals
(United Kingdom) James Auckland	4	4
2	(Netherlands) Raemon Sluiter	6	6
