= Miloš Deyl =

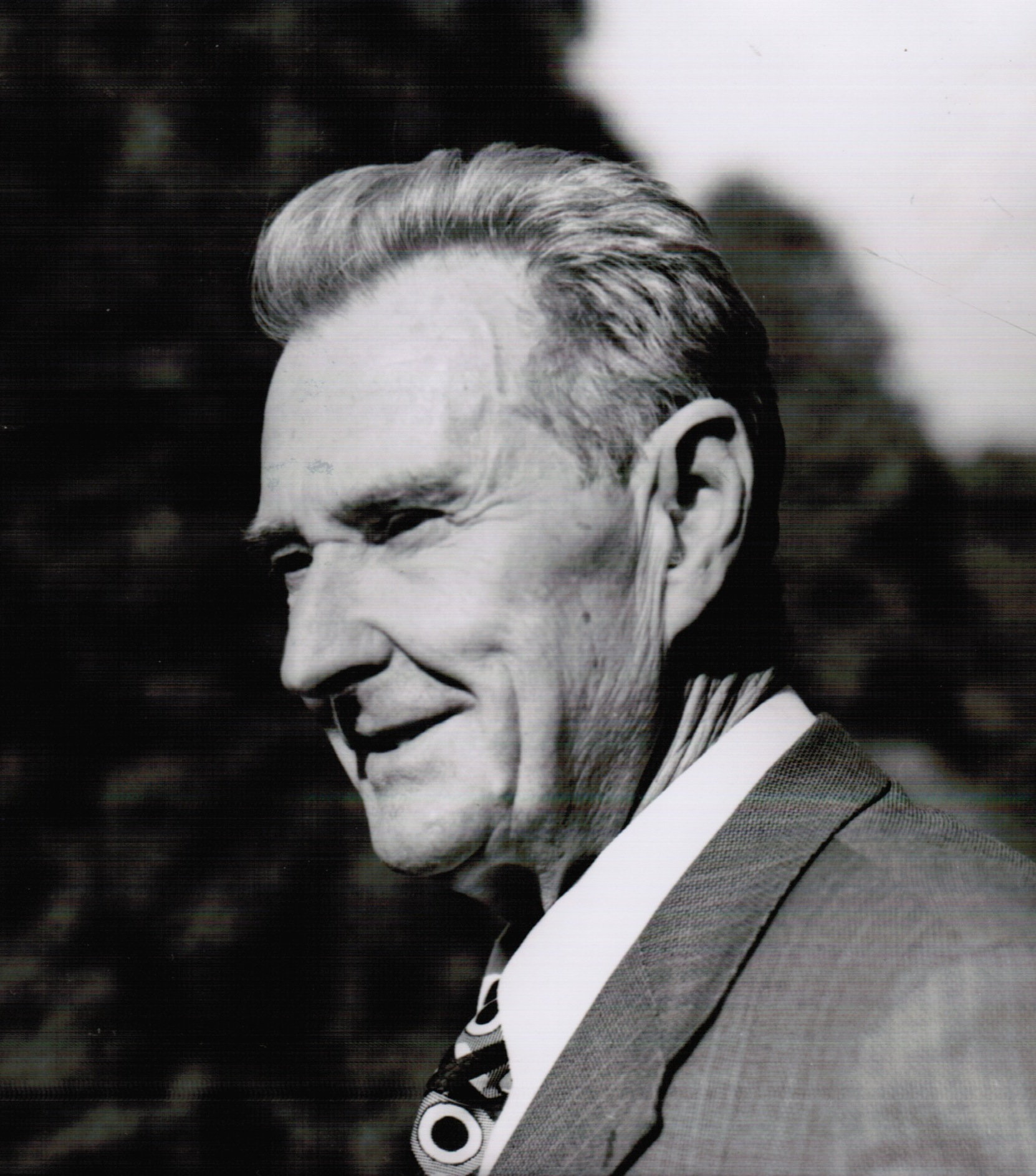
- Born: June 19, 1906; Smidary
- Died: February 21, 1985 (aged 78); Prague
- Education: Univerzita Karlova

RNDr. Miloš Deyl, DrSc. (19 June 1906 in Smidary – 21 February 1985 in Prague) was a Czechoslovak botanist. For the general public, his most famous publication is Naše květiny (Our Plants). This systematical plant atlas, illustrated by Květoslav Hísek introduces over 700 most important species of Czech Republic. Since the first release in 1973, it has been re-published 3 times, in 2001 for the last time.

== Life ==
He was born as a middle son in the family of a school director in Smidary. Between 1925 and 1929 he studied at the Faculty of Science on Charles University in Prague. In 1931, he defended a doctoral thesis with the topic Příspěvek k poznání stavů koncentrace vodíkových iontů k asociacím rostlinným there. In 1933 he was nominated as a science specialist in National Museum in Prague. in 1946, he was appointed as a national museal board member. He worked in the botany department of National Museum in Průhonice till 1976.

During the World War 2 occupation he was active in resistance group, where he encrypted radio transmissions.

In his marriage with Blažena (born Straširybková), a daughter Blanka and a son Vladimír were born.

== Scientific work ==
Next to Floristics he focused on Taxonomy of plants. In 1946 he published a monography Study of the genus Sesleria. Among botanists, he is considered to be a founder of Czech Ecology, thanks to a large Synecological study from Carpathian Ukraina. This comprehensive volume of Plants, soil and climate of Pop Ivan has been published in 1940 and serves until today as a unique comparison base for current research initiatives ("Deyl Alpine research station in Maramures Mountains"). Other important publication is "Plevele polí a zahrad", illustrated by Otto Ušák, published in 1956. He also co-authored Historický vývoj organismů by Vladimír Novák.

Every year, he travelled across Czechoslovakia and Ukraine to study local plants and environment. On his expeditions, he also joined F. A. Novák (to Montenegro and Serbia), Pavel Sillinger (to Herzegovina and Montenegro), Ivan Klášterský (to Bulgaria), Albert Pilát (to Serbian Macedonia and Switzerland to compare vegetation environment of Alps and Slovak Tatras - "Alpinky", 1939), Karel Domin, Vladimír Krajina. He brought a large collection of herbaria samples from his European expeditions.

The standard author abbreviation Deyl is used to indicate this person as the author when citing a botanical name.
