= Pip Ivan =

Pip Ivan is the transliterated name for two different mountains. It may refer to:

- Pip Ivan (Chornohora)
- Pip Ivan (Maramureș)
