= Deyl =

Deyl is a surname. Notable people with the surname include:

- Miloš Deyl (1906–1985), Czech botanist
- Radek Deyl (born 1989), Slovak ice hockey player
- Rudolf Deyl Sr. (1876–1972), Czech actor
- Rudolf Deyl Jr. (1912–1967), Czech actor, son of Rudolf
