= 2005 ATP Challenger Series =

Tennis tour

Details
- Duration: 3 January 2005 – 1 January 2006
- Edition: 28th
- Tournaments: 151

Achievements (singles)

The ATP Challenger Series is the second-tier tour for professional tennis organised by the Association of Tennis Professionals (ATP). The 2005 ATP Challenger Series calendar comprised 150 tournaments, with prize money ranging from $25,000 up to $150,000.

== Schedule ==
=== January ===
Date	Country	Tournament	Prizemoney	Surface	Singles champion	Doubles champions
03.01.	New Caledonia	Nouméa Challenger	$ 75,000	Hard	(France) Gilles Simon	(Australia) Stephen Huss (South Africa) Wesley Moodie
03.01.	Brazil	São Paulo Challenger	$ 75,000	Hard	(Brazil) Ricardo Mello	(Brazil) André Sá (Brazil) Bruno Soares
17.01.	Chile	La Serena Challenger	$ 50,000	Clay	(Argentina) Edgardo Massa	(Italy) Enzo Artoni (Paraguay) Ramón Delgado
24.01.	Germany	Heilbronn Open	$ 100,000	Carpet (i)	(Czech Republic) Jiří Vaněk	(France) Sébastien de Chaunac (Slovakia) Michal Mertiňák
24.01.	United States	Hilton Waikoloa Village USTA Challenger	$ 50,000	Hard	(United States) Paul Goldstein	(Brazil) André Sá (United States) Eric Taino
24.01.	Chile	Santiago Challenger	$ 25,000	Clay	(Germany) Tomas Behrend	(Ecuador) Giovanni Lapentti (Argentina) Damián Patriarca
24.01.	Great Britain	Wrexham Challenger	$ 25,000	Hard (i)	(Belarus) Vladimir Voltchkov	(United Kingdom) Mark Hilton (United Kingdom) Jonathan Marray
31.01.	France	Challenger 42	$ 100,000	Hard (i)	(France) Thierry Ascione	(France) Nicolas Thomann (Germany) Alexander Waske
31.01.	Poland	Breslau Challenger	$ 75,000	Hard (i)	(Czech Republic) Robin Vik	(Czech Republic) Lukáš Dlouhý (Czech Republic) Martin Štěpánek
31.01.	Germany	Volkswagen Challenger	$ 25,000	Carpet (i)	(Germany) Dieter Kindlmann	(Germany) Philipp Petzschner (Austria) Alexander Peya

=== February ===
Date	Country	Tournament	Prizemoney	Surface	Singles champion	Doubles champions
07.02.	Serbia	Belgrad Challenger	$ 50,000	Carpet (i)	(Belgium) Dick Norman	(Russia) Igor Kunitsyn (Ukraine) Orest Tereshchuk
07.02.	United States	Challenger of Dallas	$ 50,000	Hard (i)	(Sweden) Michael Ryderstedt	(South Africa) Rik de Voest (Ecuador) Giovanni Lapentti
07.02.	Australia	Burnie Challenger	$ 25,000	Hard	(Australia) Chris Guccione	(Australia) Luke Bourgeois (Australia) Chris Guccione
14.02.	France	Besançon Challenger	$ 100,000	Hard (i)	(France) Gaël Monfils	(United States) Jason Marshall (United States) Huntley Montgomery
14.02.	United States	Joplin Challenger	$ 50,000	Hard (i)	(Canada) Frédéric Niemeyer	(South Africa) Rik de Voest (Poland) Łukasz Kubot
21.02.	France	Cherbourg Challenger	$ 50,000	Hard (i)	(South Africa) Rik de Voest	(Thailand) Sanchai Ratiwatana (Thailand) Sonchat Ratiwatana
21.02.	Germany	Logopark ATP Challenger	$ 25,000	Carpet (i)	(Netherlands) Raemon Sluiter	(Czech Republic) Martin Štěpánek (Czech Republic) Pavel Šnobel

=== March ===
Date	Country	Tournament	Prizemoney	Surface	Singles champion	Doubles champions
07.03.	Japan	Kyōto Challenger	$ 25,000	Carpet (i)	(Czech Republic) Robin Vik	(Czech Republic) Pavel Šnobel (Czech Republic) Michal Tabara
14.03.	United States	Sunrise Challenger	$ 100,000	Hard	(Slovakia) Karol Beck	(United States) Rick Leach (United States) Travis Parrott
14.03.	Vietnam	Heineken Challenger	$ 50,000	Hard	(Chinese Taipei) Jimmy Wang	(United States) Cecil Mamiit (United States) Eric Taino
14.03.	Ecuador	Salinas Challenger	$ 25,000	Hard	(Netherlands) Dennis van Scheppingen	(Argentina) Juan Pablo Brzezicki (Argentina) Cristian Villagrán
14.03.	Bosnia and Herzegovina	Sarajevo Challenger	$ 25,000	Hard (i)	(Belarus) Vladimir Voltchkov	(Slovakia) Michal Mertiňák (Ukraine) Sergiy Stakhovsky
21.03.	Mexico	San Luis Potosí Challenger	$ 50,000	Clay	(Spain) Fernando Vicente	(Poland) Łukasz Kubot (Austria) Oliver Marach
21.03.	Italy	Barletta Challenger	$ 25,000	Clay	(France) Richard Gasquet	(Belgium) Tom Vanhoudt (Belgium) Kristof Vliegen
21.03.	France	Saint Brieuc Challenger	$ 25,000	Clay (i)	(France) Olivier Patience	(Romania) Victor Ioniță (Romania) Gabriel Moraru
28.03.	Italy	Neapel Challenger	$ 100,000	Clay	(France) Richard Gasquet	(Serbia and Montenegro) Janko Tipsarević (Czech Republic) Jiří Vaněk
28.03.	Mexico	León Challenger	$ 25,000	Hard	(United States) Amer Delić	(United States) Rajeev Ram (United States) Bobby Reynolds

=== April ===
Date	Country	Tournament	Prizemoney	Surface	Singles champion	Doubles champions
04.04.	Mexico	Mexiko-Stadt Challenger	$ 125,000	Clay	(France) Florent Serra	(Czech Republic) Lukáš Dlouhý (Czech Republic) Pavel Šnobel
04.04.	United States	Tallahassee Challenger	$ 50,000	Hard	(United States) Brian Vahaly	(Sweden) Robert Lindstedt (Austria) Alexander Peya
04.04.	Australia	Canberra Challenger	$ 25,000	Clay	(Australia) Chris Guccione	(Australia) Richard Fromberg (Australia) Chris Guccione
11.04.	Bermuda	Bermuda Challenger	$ 25,000	Clay	(Czech Republic) Tomáš Zíb	(Australia) Jordan Kerr (Argentina) Sebastián Prieto
11.04.	Mexico	León Challenger II	$ 25,000	Hard	(France) Jo-Wilfried Tsonga	(South Africa) Jeff Coetzee (The Bahamas) Mark Merklein
11.04.	Italy	Olbia Challenger	$ 25,000	Clay	(Germany) Tomas Behrend	(Italy) Massimo Bertolini (Italy) Uros Vico
18.04.	Colombia	Bogotá Challenger	$ 25,000	Clay	(Brazil) Marcos Daniel	(Argentina) Brian Dabul (Brazil) Marcelo Melo
18.04.	Italy	Monza Challenger	$ 25,000	Clay	(Italy) Alessio di Mauro	(France) Nicolas Devilder (France) Olivier Patience
18.04.	Great Britain	Nottingham Challenger I	$ 25,000	Hard	(Czech Republic) Robin Vik	(United Kingdom) Mark Hilton (United Kingdom) Jonathan Marray
25.04.	Tunisia	Tunis Challenger	$ 125,000	Clay	(France) Gaël Monfils	(Germany) Tomas Behrend (Sweden) Robert Lindstedt
25.04.	Italy	Rom Challenger	$ 25,000	Clay	(France) Olivier Patience	(Italy) Manuel Jorquera (Russia) Dmitry Tursunov

=== May ===
Date	Country	Tournament	Prizemoney	Surface	Singles champion	Doubles champions
02.05.	United States	Tunica Resorts Challenger	$ 50,000	Clay (i)	(United States) James Blake	(United States) Michael Russell (Serbia and Montenegro) Dušan Vemić
02.05.	Czech Republic	Ostrava Challenger	$ 25,000	Clay	(Czech Republic) Lukáš Dlouhý	(Czech Republic) Pavel Šnobel (Czech Republic) Martin Štěpánek
09.05.	Czech Republic	Prague Challenger	$ 100,000	Clay	(Czech Republic) Jan Hernych	(Australia) Jordan Kerr (Argentina) Sebastián Prieto
09.05.	United States	Forest Hills Challenger I	$ 50,000	Clay	(United States) James Blake	(Australia) Nathan Healey (The Bahamas) Mark Merklein
09.05.	Italy	Sanremo Challenger	$ 25,000	Clay	(Serbia and Montenegro) Novak Djokovic	(Italy) Francesco Aldi (Italy) Tomas Tenconi
16.05.	Croatia	Zagreb Challenger	$ 50,000	Clay	(Croatia) Ivan Ljubičić	(Romania) Gabriel Trifu (Belgium) Tom Vanhoudt
16.05.	Hungary	Budapest Challenger I	$ 25,000	Clay	(Romania) Răzvan Sabău	(Australia) Stephen Huss (Sweden) Johan Landsberg
16.05.	Germany	Ostdeutscher Sparkassen Cup	$ 25,000	Clay	(Greece) Vasilis Mazarakis	(Germany) Christopher Kas (Germany) Philipp Petzschner
16.05.	Uzbekistan	Fergana Challenger	$ 25,000	Hard	(Chinese Taipei) Lu Yen-hsun	(Uzbekistan) Murad Inoyatov (Uzbekistan) Denis Istomin
23.05.	South Korea	Busan Challenger	$ 50,000	Hard	(Thailand) Danai Udomchoke	(United States) Paul Goldstein (United States) Rajeev Ram
23.05.	Germany	Ettlingen Challenger	$ 25,000	Clay	(Chile) Adrián García	(Spain) Marc López (Spain) Albert Portas
23.05.	Slovenia	Ljubljana Challenger	$ 25,000	Clay	(Spain) Rubén Ramírez Hidalgo	(Australia) Paul Baccanello (Croatia) Lovro Zovko
23.05.	Italy	Turin Challenger	$ 25,000	Clay	(Argentina) Carlos Berlocq	(Brazil) Franco Ferreiro (Argentina) Sergio Roitman
30.05.	Czech Republic	Prostějov Challenger	$ 125,000	Clay	(Finland) Jarkko Nieminen	(Czech Republic) Lukáš Dlouhý (Czech Republic) David Škoch
30.05.	Germany	Schickedanz Open	$ 50,000	Clay	(Spain) Albert Portas	(Israel) Amir Hadad (Israel) Harel Levy
30.05.	Great Britain	Surbiton Challenger	$ 50,000	Grass	(Italy) Daniele Bracciali	(Australia) Jordan Kerr (United States) Jim Thomas
30.05.	United States	Yuba City Challenger	$ 50,000	Hard	(United States) Cecil Mamiit	(United States) Brandon Coupe (United States) Justin Gimelstob
30.05.	Italy	Sassuolo Challenger	$ 25,000	Clay	(Austria) Oliver Marach	(Argentina) Juan Pablo Brzezicki (Argentina) Cristian Villagrán

=== June ===
Date	Country	Tournament	Prizemoney	Surface	Singles champion	Doubles champions
06.06.	Switzerland	Lugano Challenger	$ 75,000	Clay	(Spain) Albert Montañés	(Italy) Enzo Artoni (Argentina) Juan Pablo Brzezicki
06.06.	Spain	Barcelona Challenger	$ 25,000	Clay	(Argentina) Sergio Roitman	(Spain) Óscar Hernández (Spain) Gabriel Trujillo Soler
06.06.	Slovakia	Košice Challenger	$ 25,000	Clay	(Romania) Răzvan Sabău	(Czech Republic) Petr Luxa (Slovakia) Igor Zelenay
13.06.	Germany	Nord/LB Open	$ 125,000	Clay	(Spain) Óscar Hernández	(Italy) Enzo Artoni (Spain) Álex López Morón
13.06.	Ecuador	Cuenca Challenger	$ 25,000	Clay	(United States) Zack Fleishman	(United States) Goran Dragicevic (United States) Mirko Pehar
20.06.	Italy	Reggio nell’Emilia Challenger	$ 25,000	Clay	(France) Thierry Ascione	(Georgia (country)) Irakli Labadze (Russia) Yuri Schukin
27.06.	Italy	Biella Challenger	$ 100,000	Clay	(Georgia (country)) Irakli Labadze	(Romania) Gabriel Trifu (Belgium) Tom Vanhoudt
27.06.	Spain	Córdoba Challenger	$ 100,000	Hard	(Cyprus) Marcos Baghdatis	(Belarus) Vladimir Voltchkov (Ukraine) Sergiy Stakhovsky
27.06.	United States	Forest Hills Challenger II	$ 50,000	Grass	(Canada) Frédéric Niemeyer	(United Kingdom) Richard Barker (United States) Huntley Montgomery
27.06.	France	Montauban Challenger	$ 25,000	Clay	(France) Édouard Roger-Vasselin	(Belgium) Steve Darcis (Belgium) Stefan Wauters

=== July ===
Date	Country	Tournament	Prizemoney	Surface	Singles champion	Doubles champions
04.07.	Netherlands	Scheveningen Challenger	$ 50,000	Clay	(Netherlands) Melle van Gemerden	(France) Julien Benneteau (France) Édouard Roger-Vasselin
04.07.	Hungary	Budaörs Challenger	$ 25,000	Clay	(Serbia) Boris Pašanski	(Israel) Amir Hadad (Israel) Harel Levy
04.07.	Italy	Mantua Challenger	$ 25,000	Clay	(Italy) Giorgio Galimberti	(Italy) Flavio Cipolla (Italy) Alessandro Motti
04.07.	Great Britain	Nottingham Challenger II	$ 25,000	Grass	(United Kingdom) Alex Bogdanovic	(United Kingdom) Josh Goodall (United Kingdom) Martin Lee
04.07.	Germany	Oberstaufen Cup	$ 25,000	Clay	(Germany) Simon Greul	(Austria) Oliver Marach (Switzerland) Jean-Claude Scherrer
11.07.	United States	Aptos Challenger	$ 75,000	Hard	(United Kingdom) Andy Murray	(Australia) Nathan Healey (United States) Eric Taino
11.07.	Italy	Rimini Challenger	$ 50,000	Clay	(France) Florent Serra	(Czech Republic) David Škoch (Czech Republic) Martin Štěpánek
11.07.	Great Britain	Manchester Challenger	$ 25,000	Grass	(Italy) Daniele Bracciali	(United Kingdom) Mark Hilton (United Kingdom) Jonathan Marray
18.07.	Colombia	Bogotá Challenger	$ 50,000	Clay	(Brazil) Marcos Daniel	(Argentina) Brian Dabul (Brazil) Marcelo Melo
18.07.	Finland	Tampere Challenger	$ 50,000	Clay	(Serbia and Montenegro) Boris Pašanski	(France) Marc Gicquel (France) Édouard Roger-Vasselin
18.07.	United States	Tarzana Challenger	$ 50,000	Hard	(United States) Alex Bogomolov Jr.	(United States) Alex Bogomolov Jr. (United States) Travis Rettenmaier
25.07.	Poland	Posen Challenger	$ 100,000	Clay	(Russia) Teymuraz Gabashvili	(Poland) Łukasz Kubot (Poland) Filip Urban
25.07.	Brazil	Campos do Jordão Challenger	$ 50,000	Hard	(Brazil) André Sá	(Denmark) Kristian Pless (Serbia and Montenegro) Alex Vlaški
25.07.	Canada	Granby Challenger	$ 50,000	Hard	(Thailand) Danai Udomchoke	(Sweden) Johan Landsberg (Chinese Taipei) Lu Yen-hsun
25.07.	United States	Lexington Challenger	$ 50,000	Hard	(Israel) Dudi Sela	(United States) Scoville Jenkins (United States) Bobby Reynolds
25.07.	Spain	Valladolid Challenger	$ 37.500	Hard	(Sweden) Filip Prpic	(Netherlands) Matwé Middelkoop (Austria) Alexander Peya
25.07.	Italy	Recanati Challenger	$ 25,000	Hard	(Italy) Davide Sanguinetti	(Italy) Uros Vico (Croatia) Lovro Zovko
25.07.	Russia	Togliatti Cup	$ 25,000	Hard	(Russia) Igor Kunitsyn	(United States) Scott Lipsky (New Zealand) Mark Nielsen

=== August ===
Date	Country	Tournament	Prizemoney	Surface	Singles champion	Doubles champions
01.08.	Spain	Segovia Challenger	$ 100,000	Hard	(Germany) Michael Berrer	(Spain) Marcel Granollers (Spain) Álex López Morón
01.08.	Canada	Vancouver Challenger	$ 100,000	Hard	(Israel) Dudi Sela	(Australia) Ashley Fisher (United States) Tripp Phillips
01.08.	Italy	Trani Challenger	$ 50,000	Clay	(Czech Republic) Lukáš Dlouhý	(Argentina) Carlos Berlocq (Argentina) Cristian Villagrán
01.08.	Brazil	Belo Horizonte Challenger	$ 25,000	Hard	(United States) John Paul Fruttero	(United States) Lesley Joseph (Serbia and Montenegro) Alex Vlaški
01.08.	Russia	Saransk Challenger	$ 25,000	Clay	(Russia) Igor Kunitsyn	(Italy) Flavio Cipolla (Germany) Simon Stadler
01.08.	Romania	Timișoara Challenger	$ 25,000	Clay	(France) Jean-Christophe Faurel	(Romania) Ionuț Moldovan (Romania) Gabriel Moraru
08.08.	San Marino	San Marino Challenger	$ 100,000	Clay	(Costa Rica) Juan Antonio Marín	(Czech Republic) Lukáš Dlouhý (Czech Republic) David Škoch
08.08.	Great Britain	DBI Tennis Challenger	$ 50,000	Hard	(United Kingdom) Andy Murray	(United States) Huntley Montgomery (United States) Tripp Phillips
08.08.	Spain	Pamplona Challenger	$ 37.500	Hard	(France) Nicolas Devilder	(Pakistan) Aisam-ul-Haq Qureshi (Croatia) Lovro Zovko
08.08.	Brazil	Gramado Challenger	$ 25,000	Hard	(Brazil) Flávio Saretta	(United States) Goran Dragicevic (United States) Mirko Pehar
08.08.	Austria	Graz Challenger	$ 25,000	Hard	(Czech Republic) Robin Vik	(Austria) Julian Knowle (Austria) Alexander Peya
15.08.	United States	Bronx Challenger	$ 50,000	Hard	(France) Thierry Ascione	(United States) Cecil Mamiit (United States) Brian Vahaly
15.08.	France	Cordenons Challenger	$ 50,000	Clay	(Argentina) Carlos Berlocq	Not completed
15.08.	Spain	Vigo Challenger	$ 37.500	Clay	(Spain) Albert Portas	(Germany) Lars Uebel (Czech Republic) Jan Vacek
15.08.	Colombia	Manta Challenger	$ 25,000	Hard	(Brazil) Thiago Alves	(Argentina) Brian Dabul (Uruguay) Marcel Felder
15.08.	Uzbekistan	Samarkand Challenger	$ 25,000	Clay	(Serbia and Montenegro) Boris Pašanski	(Croatia) Ivan Cerović (Serbia and Montenegro) Petar Popović
22.08.	Italy	Manerbio Challenger	$ 50,000	Clay	(Austria) Oliver Marach	(Netherlands) Melle van Gemerden (Netherlands) Rogier Wassen
22.08.	Switzerland	Genf Challenger	$ 37.500	Clay	(Austria) Werner Eschauer	(Spain) Rubén Ramírez Hidalgo (Spain) Santiago Ventura'
22.08.	Uzbekistan	Bukhara Challenger	$ 25,000	Hard	(Uzbekistan) Denis Istomin	(Kazakhstan) Alexey Kedryuk (Ukraine) Orest Tereshchuk
29.08.	Ukraine	Kiew Challenger	$ 50,000	Clay	(Austria) Daniel Köllerer	(Argentina) Diego Junqueira (Argentina) Martín Vassallo Argüello
29.08.	Germany	Black Forest Open	$ 25,000	Clay	(Argentina) Sergio Roitman	(Czech Republic) Pavel Šnobel (Czech Republic) Martin Štěpánek

=== September ===
Date	Country	Tournament	Prizemoney	Surface	Singles champion	Doubles champions
05.09.	Turkey	Istanbul Challenger	$ 75,000	Hard	(Chinese Taipei) Jimmy Wang	(Israel) Harel Levy (Israel) Noam Okun
05.09.	Romania	Brașov Challenger	$ 25,000	Clay	(Germany) Daniel Elsner	(Romania) Ionuț Moldovan (Romania) Gabriel Moraru
05.09.	Ukraine	Donetzk Challenger	$ 25,000	Hard	(Poland) Łukasz Kubot	(Ukraine) Mikhail Filima (Ukraine) Orest Tereshchuk
05.09.	Italy	Genua Challenger	$ 25,000	Clay	(Italy) Potito Starace	(Italy) Leonardo Azzaro (Argentina) Sergio Roitman
12.09.	France	Orléans Challenger	$ 75,000	Hard (i)	(France) Cyril Saulnier	(France) Julien Benneteau (France) Nicolas Mahut
12.09.	Spain	Sevilla Challenger	$ 37.500	Clay	(Austria) Marco Mirnegg	(Brazil) Marcos Daniel (Spain) Fernando Vicente
12.09.	Hungary	Budapest Challenger II	$ 25,000	Clay	(Serbia and Montenegro) Boris Pašanski	(Italy) Leonardo Azzaro (Argentina) Sergio Roitman
19.09.	Poland	Stettin Challenger	$ 125,000	Clay	(Argentina) Agustín Calleri	(Poland) Mariusz Fyrstenberg (Poland) Marcin Matkowski
19.09.	United States	Lubbock Challenger	$ 50,000	Hard	(Paraguay) Ramón Delgado	(United States) Hugo Armando (United States) Glenn Weiner
19.09.	Bosnia and Herzegovina	Banja Luka Challenger	$ 25,000	Clay	(Greece) Vasilis Mazarakis	(Italy) Flavio Cipolla (Austria) Rainer Eitzinger
26.09.	France	Grenoble Challenger	$ 75,000	Hard (i)	(France) Marc Gicquel	(France) Julien Benneteau (France) Nicolas Mahut
26.09.	United States	Tulsa Challenger	$ 50,000	Hard	(Israel) Harel Levy	(United States) Scott Lipsky (United States) David Martin

=== October ===
Date	Country	Tournament	Prizemoney	Surface	Singles champion	Doubles champions
03.10.	France	Mons Challenger	$ 125,000	Carpet (i)	(Belgium) Olivier Rochus	(Germany) Christopher Kas (Germany) Philipp Petzschner
03.10.	Italy	Rom Challenger	$ 25,000	Clay	(France) Olivier Patience	(Italy) Manuel Jorquera (Russia) Dmitry Tursunov
10.10.	United States	Sacramento Challenger	$ 50,000	Hard	(South Africa) Rik de Voest	(United States) Scott Lipsky (United States) David Martin
10.10.	Spain	Barcelona Challenger	$ 25,000	Clay	(Argentina) Sergio Roitman	(Spain) Óscar Hernández (Spain) Gabriel Trujillo Soler
10.10.	Ecuador	Quito Challenger	$ 25,000	Clay	(Brazil) Thiago Alves	(United States) Hugo Armando (United States) Glenn Weiner
17.10.	Colombia	Bogotá Challenger	$ 50,000	Clay	(Brazil) Marcos Daniel	(Argentina) Brian Dabul (Brazil) Marcelo Melo
17.10.	United States	Calabasas Challenger	$ 50,000	Hard	(United States) Brian Vahaly	(United States) Amer Delic (United States) Bobby Reynolds
17.10.	Denmark	Kolding Challenger	$ 50,000	Carpet (i)	(Russia) Dmitry Tursunov	(Australia) Stephen Huss (Sweden) Johan Landsberg
17.10.	Great Britain	Southampton Challenger	$ 25,000	Hard (i)	(France) Jérôme Haehnel	(South Africa) Jeff Coetzee (Netherlands) Rogier Wassen
24.10.	South Korea	Seoul Challenger	$ 100,000	Hard	(South Korea) Lee Hyung-taik	(Austria) Alexander Peya (Germany) Björn Phau
24.10.	United States	Carson Challenger	$ 50,000	Hard	(United States) Justin Gimelstob	(United States) Goran Dragicevic (United States) Jan-Michael Gambill
24.10.	Chile	Santiago Challenger	$ 50,000	Clay	(Germany) Tomas Behrend	(Ecuador) Giovanni Lapentti (Argentina) Damián Patriarca
31.10.	United States	Boston Challenger	$ 75,000	Hard (i)	(United States) Paul Goldstein	(Paraguay) Ramón Delgado (Brazil) André Sá
31.10.	Germany	Lambertz Open by STAWAG	$ 50,000	Carpet (i)	(Russia) Evgeny Korolev	(United Kingdom) James Auckland (United Kingdom) Jamie Delgado
31.10.	South Korea	Busan Challenger	$ 50,000	Hard	(Thailand) Danai Udomchoke	(United States) Paul Goldstein (United States) Rajeev Ram
31.10.	Uruguay	Montevideo Challenger	$ 50,000	Clay	(Argentina) Juan Martín del Potro	(Argentina) Brian Dabul (Argentina) Damián Patriarca
31.10.	Australia	Caloundra Challenger	$ 25,000	Hard	(Australia) Peter Luczak	(Australia) Peter Luczak (Australia) Shannon Nettle

=== November ===
Date	Country	Tournament	Prizemoney	Surface	Singles champion	Doubles champions
07.11.	Slovakia	Bratislava Challenger	$ 100,000	Hard (i)	(Slovakia) Dominik Hrbatý	(South Africa) Chris Haggard (Switzerland) Jean-Claude Scherrer
07.11.	United States	Nashville Challenger	$ 75,000	Hard (i)	(United States) Bobby Reynolds	(Serbia) Ilija Bozoljac (United States) Brian Wilson
07.11.	Colombia	Guayaquil Challenger	$ 50,000	Clay	(Brazil) Marcos Daniel	(Argentina) Juan Martín del Potro (Costa Rica) Juan Antonio Marín
07.11.	Germany	Bauer Watertechnology Cup	$ 25,000	Carpet (i)	(Germany) Michael Berrer	(Germany) Christopher Kas (Germany) Philipp Petzschner
14.11.	Ukraine	Dnipro Challenger	$ 125,000	Hard (i)	(Belgium) Dick Norman	(Czech Republic) Lukáš Dlouhý (Czech Republic) David Škoch
14.11.	Brazil	Aracaju Challenger	$ 100,000	Clay	(Serbia and Montenegro) Boris Pašanski	(Argentina) Máximo González (Argentina) Sergio Roitman
14.11.	France	Champaign Challenger	$ 50,000	Hard (i)	(Thailand) Danai Udomchoke	(Australia) Ashley Fisher (United States) Tripp Phillips
14.11.	Finland	Helsinki Challenger	$ 50,000	Hard (i)	(Sweden) Björn Rehnquist	(Switzerland) Yves Allegro (Germany) Michael Kohlmann
14.11.	Mexico	Puebla Challenger	$ 25,000	Hard	(United States) Hugo Armando	(Austria) Werner Eschauer (Germany) Alexander Satschko
21.11.	Luxembourg	Luxemburg Challenger	$ 150,000	Hard (i)	(Belgium) Christophe Rochus	(United States) Eric Butorac (United States) Chris Drake
21.11.	Argentina	Buenos Aires Challenger	$ 100,000	Clay	(Argentina) Carlos Berlocq	(Argentina) Lucas Arnold Ker (Argentina) Sebastián Prieto
21.11.	Czech Republic	Prague Challenger	$ 25,000	Carpet (i)	(Netherlands) Raemon Sluiter	(Slovakia) Filip Polášek (Ukraine) Sergiy Stakhovsky
21.11.	Réunion	La Réunion Challenger	$ 25,000	Hard	(Germany) Philipp Kohlschreiber	(Russia) Teymuraz Gabashvili (France) Stéphane Robert
21.11.	Great Britain	Sunderland Challenger	$ 25,000	Hard (i)	(United Kingdom) Alex Bogdanovic	(Germany) Frank Moser (Germany) Sebastian Rieschick
28.11.	United States	Orlando Challenger	$ 50,000	Hard	(United States) Michael Russell	(Australia) Ashley Fisher (United States) Tripp Phillips

=== December ===
Date	Country	Tournament	Prizemoney	Surface	Singles champion	Doubles champions
26.12.	Qatar	Doha Challenger	$ 50,000	Hard	(France) Olivier Patience	(Poland) Łukasz Kubot (Austria) Oliver Marach
