= Naveed Gill (athlete) =

Czech polo player

Naveed Gill is a Czech polo player.

== Early life and professional career ==
Naveed Gill founded the first ever polo club in the Czech Republic, Prague Polo Club in 2008, which was renamed to the Gill Polo Club, registered with Czech Ministry of the Interior 2008.

In 2011, in order to develop awareness, the first International Polo Match between the Czech Republic and Slovak Republic took place in Chlumec Nad Cidlinou organised between Prague Polo Club and the Danube Polo Club of Slovakia was organised by Naveed Gill to raise more awareness of horse polo in the Czech Republic.

Gill hosted Polo at the International Horse Festival in Pardubice in 2012.

In 2014, Gill organized the first snow polo competition in the Czech Republic and the first Polo in the Park at the Czech Botanical Gardens in Průhonice.

== Personal life ==
He lives in the Central Bohemian Region.
