= 2003 ATP Challenger Series =

Tennis tour

Details
- Duration: 30 December 2002 – 11 January 2004
- Edition: 26th
- Tournaments: 135

Achievements (singles)

The ATP Challenger Series is the second tier tour for professional tennis organised by the Association of Tennis Professionals (ATP). The 2003 ATP Challenger Series calendar comprised 135 tournaments, with prize money ranging from $25,000 up to $150,000.

== Schedule ==
=== January ===
Date	Country	Tournament	Prizemoney	Surface	Singles champion	Doubles champions
30.12. 2002	Brazil	Aberto de São Paulo	$ 25,000	Hard	(Brazil) Flávio Saretta	(Argentina) Federico Browne (Netherlands) Rogier Wassen
20.01	Germany	Heilbronn Open	$ 100,000	Carpet (i)	(Slovakia) Karol Beck	(Sweden) Simon Aspelin (Sweden) Johan Landsberg
20.01	United States	Hilton Waikoloa Village USTA Challenger	$ 37.500	Hard	(United States) Robby Ginepri	(United States) Diego Ayala (United States) Robert Kendrick
20.01	United States	Challenger of Dallas	$ 50,000	Hard (i)	(Germany) Simon Greul	(United States) Justin Gimelstob (United States) Scott Humphries
20.01	Germany	Warsteiner Challenger	$ 25,000	Carpet (i)	(Croatia) Mario Ančić	(North Macedonia) Aleksandar Kitinov (Sweden) Magnus Larsson

=== February ===
Date	Country	Tournament	Prizemoney	Surface	Singles champion	Doubles champions
03.02.	Poland	KGHM Polish Indoors	$ 150,000	Hard (i)	(Slovakia) Karol Kučera	(Czech Republic) Petr Luxa (Czech Republic) David Škoch
03.02.	United States	Joplin Challenger	$ 50,000	Hard (i)	(United States) Bob Bryan	(Argentina) Martín García (United States) Graydon Oliver
03.02.	Yugoslavia	Belgrad Challenger	$ 25,000	Carpet (i)	(Netherlands) Dennis van Scheppingen	(Serbia and Montenegro) Ilija Bozoljac (Serbia and Montenegro) Nenad Zimonjić
10.02.	Germany	Warsteiner Challenger Lübeck	$ 25,000	Carpet (i)	(Germany) Alexander Waske	(Czech Republic) Ota Fukárek (Australia) Jordan Kerr
17.02.	France	Challenger 42	$ 100,000	Hard (i)	(France) Thierry Ascione	(Czech Republic) David Škoch (Croatia) Lovro Zovko
17.02.	Germany	Volkswagen Challenger	$ 25,000	Carpet (i)	(Germany) Axel Pretzsch	(Germany) Karsten Braasch (Germany) Axel Pretzsch
24.02.	France	Challenger Ford de Cherbourg-Octeville	$ 50,000	Hard (i)	(Argentina) Sergio Roitman	(France) Benjamin Cassaigne (South Africa) Rik de Voest
24.02.	Great Britain	Wrexham Challenger	$ 25,000	Hard	(South Africa) Wesley Moodie	(Italy) Daniele Bracciali (Italy) Federico Luzzi

=== March ===
Date	Country	Tournament	Prizemoney	Surface	Singles champion	Doubles champions
03.03.	France	Besançon Challenger	$ 37.500	Hard (i)	(France) Cyril Saulnier	(Israel) Jonathan Erlich (Austria) Julian Knowle
03.03.	Japan	Shimadzu All Japan Indoor Tennis Championships	$ 25,000	Carpet (i)	(Czech Republic) Michal Tabara	(Israel) Amir Hadad (Israel) Andy Ram
10.03.	Vietnam	Heineken Challenger	$ 50,000	Hard	(Israel) Amir Hadad	(South Africa) Rik de Voest (South Africa) Wesley Moodie
10.03.	Ecuador	Abierto Internacional de Salinas	$ 25,000	Hard	(Ecuador) Giovanni Lapentti	(Argentina) Martín García (Argentina) Sebastián Prieto
10.03.	Slovakia	Sarajevo Challenger	$ 25,000	Hard (i)	(France) Richard Gasquet	(Czech Republic) Tomáš Berdych (Czech Republic) Jaroslav Levinský
10.03.	Australia	Hobart Challenger	$ 25,000	Hard	(Japan) Satoshi Iwabuchi	(Argentina) Federico Browne (Netherlands) Rogier Wassen
17.03.	Italy	Cagliari Challenger	$ 25,000	Clay	(Italy) Filippo Volandri	(Spain) Álex López Morón (Argentina) Andrés Schneiter
24.03.	Italy	Torneo Internazionale di Tennis Città della Disfida Open	$ 25,000	Clay	(Spain) Rafael Nadal	(Argentina) Sebastián Prieto (Argentina) Sergio Roitman

=== April ===
Date	Country	Tournament	Prizemoney	Surface	Singles champion	Doubles champions
07.04.	United States	Calabasas Challenger	$ 50,000	Hard	(France) Jérôme Golmard	(United States) Justin Gimelstob (United States) Scott Humphries
07.04.	Italy	Sanremo Challenger	$ 25,000	Clay	(Germany) Tomas Behrend	(Italy) Daniele Bracciali (Israel) Amir Hadad
14.04.	Bermuda	XL Bermuda Open	$ 100,000	Clay	(Brazil) Flávio Saretta	(United States) Robert Kendrick (The Bahamas) Mark Merklein
14.04.	Mexico	San Luis Potosí Challenger	$ 50,000	Clay	(Belgium) Dick Norman	(United States) Alex Bogomolov Jr. (Canada) Frédéric Niemeyer
21.04.	India	Indian Oil Servo ATP Challenger Bangalore	$ 25,000	Hard	(France) Grégory Carraz	(France) Rodolphe Cadart (France) Grégory Carraz
21.04.	Mexico	León Challenger	$ 25,000	Hard	(United States) Alex Bogomolov Jr.	(Czech Republic) Ota Fukárek (Australia) Jordan Kerr
21.04.	Italy	Naples Challenger	$ 25,000	Clay	(France) Richard Gasquet	(Italy) Massimo Bertolini (Italy) Giorgio Galimberti
28.04.	France	Aix-en-Provence Challenger	$ 125,000	Clay	(Argentina) Mariano Puerta	(Australia) Stephen Huss (South Africa) Myles Wakefield
28.04.	India	Indian Oil Servo ATP Challenger New Delhi	$ 25,000	Hard	(Switzerland) Ivo Heuberger	(Bulgaria) Radoslav Lukaev (Russia) Dmitry Vlasov
28.04.	Italy	Rome Challenger	$ 25,000	Clay	(Italy) Giorgio Galimberti	(Israel) Amir Hadad (Argentina) Martín Vassallo Argüello

=== May ===
Date	Country	Tournament	Prizemoney	Surface	Singles champion	Doubles champions
05.05.	United States	Birmingham Challenger	$ 50,000	Clay	(Spain) Óscar Hernández	(Brazil) Josh Goffi (United States) Travis Parrott
12.05.	United States	Forest Hills Challenger	$ 50,000	Clay	(United States) Alex Bogomolov Jr.	(United States) Justin Gimelstob (United States) Scott Humphries
12.05.	Croatia	Zagreb Open	$ 50,000	Clay	(Belgium) Kristof Vliegen	(Argentina) Lucas Arnold Ker (Argentina) Mariano Hood
12.05.	Uzbekistan	Fergana Challenger	$ 25,000	Hard	(Finland) Tuomas Ketola	(South Africa) Justin Bower (Pakistan) Aisam-ul-Haq Qureshi
12.05.	Slovakia	Košice Challenger	$ 25,000	Clay	(Argentina) Martín Vassallo Argüello	(Australia) Stephen Huss (South Africa) Myles Wakefield
19.05.	Czech Republic	ECM Prague Open	$ 100,000	Clay	(Netherlands) Sjeng Schalken	(Czech Republic) Tomáš Berdych (Czech Republic) Michal Navrátil
19.05.	Hungary	Budapest Challenger I	$ 25,000	Clay	(Sweden) Johan Settergren	(Argentina) Ignacio González King (Argentina) Juan Pablo Guzmán
26.05.	Slovenia	Ljubljana Challenger	$ 25,000	Clay	(Czech Republic) Jiří Vaněk	(Italy) Leonardo Azzaro (Hungary) Gergely Kisgyörgy
26.05.	Italy	Turin Challenger	$ 25,000	Clay	(Spain) Óscar Serrano	(Spain) Emilio Benfele Álvarez (Spain) Gabriel Trujillo Soler

=== June ===
Date	Country	Tournament	Prizemoney	Surface	Singles champion	Doubles champions
02.06.	Czech Republic	Unicredit Czech Open	$ 125,000	Clay	(Czech Republic) Radek Štěpánek	(Czech Republic) Jaroslav Levinský (Czech Republic) David Škoch
02.06.	Germany	Schickedanz Open	$ 50,000	Clay	(Norway) Jan Frode Andersen	(Germany) Denis Gremelmayr (Germany) Simon Greul
02.06.	Great Britain	Surbiton Trophy	$ 50,000	Grass	(South Africa) Wesley Moodie	(Australia) Joshua Eagle (Australia) Andrew Kratzmann
02.06.	United States	Tallahassee Challenger	$ 50,000	Hard	(United States) Paul Goldstein	Not completed
02.06.	Italy	Sassuolo Challenger	$ 25,000	Clay	(Spain) Mariano Albert-Ferrando	(Australia) Paul Baccanello (Italy) Stefano Galvani
09.06.	Italy	Biella Challenger	$ 100,000	Clay	(Italy) Filippo Volandri	(Italy) Stefano Galvani (Argentina) Martín Vassallo Argüello
09.06.	Germany	ATU Cup	$ 50,000	Clay	(Germany) Tomas Behrend	(Argentina) Mariano Delfino (Argentina) Patricio Rudi
09.06.	United States	Atlantic City Challenger	$ 25,000	Hard	(Sweden) Björn Rehnquist	(United States) Tripp Phillips (United States) Ryan Sachire
09.06.	South Korea	Busan Challenger	$ 25,000	Hard	(South Korea) Kim Young-jun	(Japan) Toshihide Matsui (Japan) Michihisa Onoda
16.06.	Germany	Nord/LB Open	$ 125,000	Clay	(Austria) Werner Eschauer	(Argentina) Sebastián Prieto (United States) Jim Thomas
16.06.	Switzerland	Lugano Challenger	$ 50,000	Clay	(Argentina) Diego Moyano	(Spain) Joan Balcells (Spain) Juan Albert Viloca
23.06.	Andorra	Andorra Challenger	$ 25,000	Hard (i)	(France) Grégory Carraz	(South Africa) Rik de Voest (Finland) Tuomas Ketola
23.06.	Italy	Reggio Emilia Challenger	$ 25,000	Clay	(France) Richard Gasquet	(Australia) Joseph Sirianni (Netherlands) Rogier Wassen
Spain	Pozoblanco Challenger	$ 75,000	Hard	(Italy) Stefano Pescosolido	(United States) Brandon Coupe (Israel) Noam Okun	
Italy	Mantua Challenger	$ 25,000	Clay	(Italy) Vincenzo Santopadre	(Italy) Enzo Artoni (Argentina) Martín Vassallo Argüello	
France	Montauban Challenger	$ 25,000	Clay	(Argentina) Juan Pablo Guzmán	(Netherlands) Fred Hemmes (Netherlands) Rogier Wassen	
Germany	Internationale Badische Meisterschaften um den Techem Cup – Zell	$ 25,000	Clay	(Serbia and Montenegro) Janko Tipsarević	(Germany) Karsten Braasch (Germany) Franz Stauder	

=== July ===
Date	Country	Tournament	Prizemoney	Surface	Singles champion	Doubles champions
07.07.	Canada	Granby Challenger	$ 50,000	Hard	(Canada) Frank Dancevic	(Chinese Taipei) Lu Yen-hsun (Thailand) Danai Udomchoke
07.07.	Netherlands	Scheveningen Challenger	$ 50,000	Clay	(Australia) Todd Larkham	(Netherlands) Fred Hemmes (Netherlands) Edwin Kempes
07.07.	Great Britain	West of England Challenger	$ 25,000	Grass	(Italy) Massimo Dell'Acqua	(France) Jean-François Bachelot (France) Nicolas Mahut
07.07.	Germany	Oberstaufen Cup	$ 25,000	Clay	(Argentina) Martín Vassallo Argüello	(Hungary) Kornél Bardóczky (Hungary) Gergely Kisgyörgy
14.07.	Finland	Helsinki Challenger I	$ 125,000	Clay (i)	(Italy) Davide Sanguinetti	(Sweden) Robert Lindstedt (Sweden) Robin Söderling
14.07.	United States	Aptos Challenger	$ 50,000	Hard	(United States) Jeff Salzenstein	(Czech Republic) Jan Hernych (Italy) Uros Vico
14.07.	Hungary	Budaörs Challenger	$ 50,000	Clay	(Czech Republic) Tomáš Berdych	(Italy) Leonardo Azzaro (Hungary) Gergely Kisgyörgy
14.07.	Great Britain	Manchester Challenger	$ 25,000	Grass	(France) Nicolas Mahut	(United Kingdom) Martin Lee (United Kingdom) Arvind Parmar
14.07.	Italy	Olbia Challenger	$ 25,000	Clay	(Spain) Nicolás Almagro	(Italy) Alessio di Mauro (Italy) Vincenzo Santopadre
14.07.	Russia	Togliatti Cup	$ 25,000	Hard	(Israel) Dudi Sela	(Japan) Jun Kato (Austria) Alexander Peya
21.07.	Brazil	Campos do Jordão Challenger	$ 75,000	Hard	(Ecuador) Giovanni Lapentti	(South Africa) Rik de Voest (Ecuador) Giovanni Lapentti
21.07.	Netherlands	Hilversum Challenger	$ 75,000	Clay	(Netherlands) Martin Verkerk	(Poland) Mariusz Fyrstenberg (Poland) Marcin Matkowski
21.07.	Great Britain	Lexington Challenger	$ 50,000	Hard	(Canada) Frank Dancevic	(Israel) Jonathan Erlich (Japan) Takao Suzuki
21.07.	Finland	Tampere Challenger	$ 50,000	Clay	(Sweden) Robin Söderling	(Russia) Igor Andreev (Russia) Dmitry Vlasov
21.07.	Spain	Valladolid Challenger	$ 37.500	Hard	(Luxembourg) Gilles Müller	(Japan) Jun Kato (Poland) Łukasz Kubot
21.07.	Italy	Recanati Challenger	$ 25,000	Hard	(Italy) Daniele Bracciali	(Italy) Manuel Jorquera (Germany) Frank Moser
28.07.	Spain	Segovia Challenger	$ 100,000	Hard	(Spain) Rafael Nadal	(Czech Republic) Ota Fukárek (United States) Tripp Phillips
28.07.	Brazil	Belo Horizonte Challenger	$ 25,000	Hard	(Chile) Julio Peralta	(Brazil) Marcos Daniel (Brazil) Alexandre Simoni
28.07.	United States	Denver Challenger	$ 25,000	Hard	(United Kingdom) Arvind Parmar	(India) Rohan Bopanna (Pakistan) Aisam-ul-Haq Qureshi
28.07.	Russia	St. Petersburg Challenger	$ 25,000	Clay	(Germany) Florian Mayer	(Russia) Mikhail Elgin (Ukraine) Orest Tereshchuk
28.07.	Italy	Trani Challenger	$ 25,000	Clay	(Argentina) Martín Vassallo Argüello	(Argentina) Mariano Delfino (Argentina) Matias O'Neille

=== August ===
Date	Country	Tournament	Prizemoney	Surface	Singles champion	Doubles champions
04.08.	San Marino	San Marino Challenger	$ 100,000	Clay	(Italy) Alessio di Mauro	(Italy) Massimo Bertolini (Belgium) Tom Vanhoudt
04.08.	United States	Binghamton Professional Tennis Tournament	$ 50,000	Hard	(Croatia) Ivo Karlović	(Israel) Jonathan Erlich (Israel) Andy Ram
04.08.	Russia	Mordovia Challenger	$ 25,000	Clay	(Czech Republic) Martin Štěpánek	(Hungary) Kornél Bardóczky (Czech Republic) Martin Štěpánek
04.08.	Uzbekistan	Samarkand Challenger	$ 25,000	Clay	(Austria) Daniel Köllerer	(Slovakia) Viktor Bruthans (Ukraine) Sergiy Stakhovsky
11.08.	United States	Bronx Challenger	$ 50,000	Hard	(Croatia) Ivo Karlović	(France) Julien Benneteau (France) Nicolas Mahut
11.08.	Uzbekistan	Bukhara Challenger	$ 25,000	Hard	(Germany) Marc-Kevin Goellner	(Kazakhstan) Alexey Kedryuk (Uzbekistan) Vadim Kutsenko
11.08.	Austria	Graz Challenger	$ 25,000	Hard	(Czech Republic) Tomáš Berdych	(Israel) Noam Behr (Czech Republic) Ota Fukárek
11.08.	Italy	Banca Marche Tennis Cup	$ 25,000	Clay	(Switzerland) Stan Wawrinka	(Australia) Todd Perry (Japan) Thomas Shimada
18.08.	Italy	Manerbio Challenger	$ 50,000	Clay	(France) Olivier Patience	(Poland) Mariusz Fyrstenberg (Poland) Marcin Matkowski
18.08.	Switzerland	Geneva Challenger	$ 37.500	Clay	(Switzerland) Stan Wawrinka	(Spain) Álex López Morón (Argentina) Andrés Schneiter
18.08.	Germany	BMW Challenger Open	$ 25,000	Clay	(Germany) Daniel Elsner	(Georgia (country)) Irakli Labadze (Netherlands) Rogier Wassen
25.08.	Italy	Brindisi Challenger	$ 25,000	Clay	(Spain) Galo Blanco	(Spain) Iván Navarro (Croatia) Mario Radić
25.08.	Germany	Black Forest Open	$ 25,000	Clay	(Spain) Gorka Fraile	(Germany) Franz Stauder (Germany) Alexander Waske

=== September ===
Date	Country	Tournament	Prizemoney	Surface	Singles champion	Doubles champions
01.09.	Turkey	Istanbul Challenger	$ 75,000	Hard	(Sweden) Robin Söderling	(Israel) Jonathan Erlich (Israel) Andy Ram
01.09.	Ukraine	Kyiv Challenger	$ 50,000	Clay	(Georgia (country)) Irakli Labadze	(Argentina) Ignacio González King (Argentina) Juan Pablo Guzmán
01.09.	Germany	Rhein-Main Challenger	$ 25,000	Clay	(Germany) Dieter Kindlmann	(Germany) Karsten Braasch (Germany) Franz Stauder
01.09.	Romania	Brașov Challenger	$ 25,000	Clay	(Germany) Daniel Elsner	(Austria) Alexander Peya (Netherlands) Rogier Wassen
01.09.	Italy	Genova Challenger	$ 25,000	Clay	(Spain) Óscar Hernández	(Italy) Daniele Bracciali (Italy) Vincenzo Santopadre
01.09.	Brazil	Gramado Challenger	$ 25,000	Hard	(Brazil) Marcos Daniel	(Brazil) Marcos Daniel (Brazil) Alexandre Simoni
08.09.	Hungary	Budapest Challenger II	$ 25,000	Clay	(Spain) Marc López	(Argentina) Ignacio González King (Argentina) Juan Pablo Guzmán
08.09.	Ukraine	Donetsk Challenger	$ 25,000	Hard	(Czech Republic) Tomáš Cakl	(India) Harsh Mankad (United States) Jason Marshall
08.09.	Bulgaria	Sofia Challenger	$ 25,000	Clay	(France) Stéphane Robert	(Bulgaria) Ilia Kushev (Austria) Luben Pampoulov
15.09.	France	St. Jean de Luz Challenger	$ 125,000	Hard (i)	(Georgia (country)) Irakli Labadze	(France) Julien Benneteau (France) Nicolas Mahut
15.09.	Poland	Szczecin Challenger	$ 125,000	Clay	(Chile) Nicolás Massú	(Poland) Mariusz Fyrstenberg (Poland) Marcin Matkowski
15.09.	South Korea	Seoul Challenger	$ 75,000	Hard	(South Korea) Lee Hyung-taik	(United States) Alex Kim (South Korea) Lee Hyung-taik
15.09.	Bosnia and Herzegovina	Banja Luka Challenger	$ 25,000	Clay	(Croatia) Mario Radić	(Romania) Ionuț Moldovan (Russia) Yuri Schukin
15.09.	United States	Mandeville Challenger	$ 25,000	Hard	(Russia) Dmitry Tursunov	(France) Sébastien de Chaunac (United States) Zack Fleishman
15.09.	Mexico	Mexiko City Challenger	$ 25,000	Hard	(Chile) Adrián García	(United States) Huntley Montgomery (United States) Andres Pedroso
15.09.	Iran	Tehran Challenger	$ 25,000	Clay	(Spain) Óscar Hernández	(Austria) Daniel Köllerer (Austria) Philipp Müllner
22.09.	France	Grenoble Challenger	$ 75,000	Hard (i)	(France) Richard Gasquet	(Australia) Paul Baccanello (Israel) Harel Levy
22.09.	United States	San Antonio Challenger	$ 50,000	Hard	(Russia) Dmitry Tursunov	(United States) Paul Goldstein (United States) Jeff Morrison
29.09.	United States	Fresno Challenger	$ 50,000	Hard	(United States) Alex Kim	(United States) Diego Ayala (United States) Travis Parrott
29.09.	Netherlands	Groningen Challenger	$ 50,000	Hard (i)	(Belgium) Kristof Vliegen	(Israel) Amir Hadad (Israel) Harel Levy
29.09.	Spain	Seville Challenger	$ 37.500	Clay	(Peru) Luis Horna	(Spain) Óscar Hernández (Spain) Albert Portas
29.09.	India	Tumkur Open	$ 25,000	Hard	(Germany) Philipp Kohlschreiber	(India) Prakash Amritraj (South Africa) Rik de Voest

=== October ===
Date	Country	Tournament	Prizemoney	Surface	Singles champion	Doubles champions
06.10.	Spain	Barcelona Challenger	$ 25,000	Clay	(Spain) Albert Portas	(Spain) Juan Ignacio Carrasco (Argentina) Mariano Delfino
06.10.	India	Dharwad Challenger	$ 25,000	Hard	(Thailand) Danai Udomchoke	(Thailand) Sanchai Ratiwatana (Thailand) Sonchat Ratiwatana
06.10.	Ecuador	Quito Challenger	$ 25,000	Clay	(Ecuador) Giovanni Lapentti	(Brazil) Ricardo Mello (Brazil) Alexandre Simoni
13.10.	United States	Tiburon Challenger	$ 37.500	Hard	(United States) Alex Bogomolov Jr.	(United States) Brandon Coupe (United States) Justin Gimelstob
13.10.	India	Belgaum Open	$ 25,000	Hard	(Russia) Yuri Schukin	(Slovakia) Michal Mertiňák (Slovakia) Branislav Sekáč
13.10.	Réunion	La Réunion Challenger	$ 25,000	Hard	(Netherlands) Peter Wessels	(Argentina) Federico Browne (Netherlands) Rogier Wassen
20.10.	United States	Torrance Challenger	$ 50,000	Hard	(Serbia) Janko Tipsarević	(Paraguay) Ramón Delgado (Brazil) André Sá
27.10.	Germany	Lambertz Open by STAWAG	$ 50,000	Carpet (i)	(Austria) Alexander Peya	(Poland) Mariusz Fyrstenberg (Poland) Marcin Matkowski
27.10.	United States	Waco Challenger	$ 50,000	Hard	(Ecuador) Giovanni Lapentti	(United States) Devin Bowen (Australia) Ashley Fisher
27.10.	Great Britain	Nottingham Challenger	$ 25,000	Hard (i)	(Sweden) Joachim Johansson	(Israel) Amir Hadad (Israel) Harel Levy

=== November ===
Date	Country	Tournament	Prizemoney	Surface	Singles champion	Doubles champions
03.11.	Slovakia	Bratislava Challenger	$ 100,000	Hard (i)	(Switzerland) Marc Rosset	(Israel) Jonathan Erlich (Israel) Harel Levy
03.11.	Germany	Okal Cup	$ 25,000	Carpet (i)	(Netherlands) Dennis van Scheppingen	(Australia) Stephen Huss (Sweden) Robert Lindstedt
10.11.	Ukraine	Dnipro Challenger	$ 125,000	Hard (i)	(Georgia (country)) Irakli Labadze	(Israel) Jonathan Erlich (Israel) Harel Levy
10.11.	Finland	Helsinki Challenger II	$ 50,000	Hard (i)	(Italy) Davide Sanguinetti	(Sweden) Robert Lindstedt (Sweden) Robin Söderling
10.11.	United States	Austin Challenger	$ 25,000	Hard	(United States) Paul Goldstein	(Chinese Taipei) Lu Yen-hsun (United States) Jason Marshall
17.11.	France	Champaign Challenger	$ 50,000	Hard (i)	(United States) Paul Goldstein	(United States) Travis Parrott (Brazil) Bruno Soares
17.11.	Czech Republic	Prague Challenger II	$ 25,000	Carpet (i)	(Switzerland) Marc Rosset	(Czech Republic) Martin Štěpánek (Slovakia) Igor Zelenay
17.11.	Mexico	Puebla Challenger	$ 25,000	Hard	(Brazil) Ricardo Mello	(Mexico) Santiago González (Mexico) Alejandro González
24.11.	Italy	Milan Challenger	$ 50,000	Carpet (i)	(Netherlands) Dennis van Scheppingen	(Italy) Davide Sanguinetti (Japan) Takao Suzuki

=== December ===
Date	Country	Tournament	Prizemoney	Surface	Singles champion	Doubles champions
01.12.	Austria	Ischgl Challenger	$ 25,000	Carpet (i)	(Sweden) Joachim Johansson	(Austria) Julian Knowle (Austria) Alexander Peya
29.12.	New Caledonia	Nouméa Challenger	$ 37.500	Hard	(Argentina) Guillermo Cañas	(Australia) Ashley Fisher (Australia) Stephen Huss
