= Czech Indoor Open =

Tennis tournament in the Czech Republic

Defunct tennis tournament
- Event name: Czech Indoor Open
- Founded: 2003
- Abolished: 2005
- Editions: 3 (Men); 1 (Women)
- Location: Průhonice, Czech Republic
- Venue: Sport Center Hala Club Hotel
- Category: ATP Challenger Series; ITF Women's Circuit (2005)
- Surface: Hard (i)
- Draw: 32S / 32Q / 16D
- Website: Official Website

The Czech Indoor Open was played on the indoor hard courts of Sport Center Hala Club Hotel (known as Sportovní Hala Club Hotel Průhonice in original language). It was part of ATP Challenger Series. It was held in Průhonice, Czech Republic, since 2003.

Record holder is Igor Zelenay who won two consecutive doubles editions with different partners.

== History ==
The Czech Indoor Open was played since its inception on the courts of the Sport Center Club Hotel in Průhonice, in front of the hotel which served as accommodation for participants. Its three editions were named Czech Indoor Open by Třinecké železárny in 2003, as Czech Indoor Open by ČEZ in 2004, and as Zentiva Czech Indoor Open in 2005, every time for sponsorship reasons.

== Past finals ==
=== Men's singles ===
Year	Champion	Runner-up	Score
2003	(Switzerland) Marc Rosset	(Belgium) Dick Norman	7–6^{(7–4)}, 6^{(1–7)}–7, 7–6^{(7–3)}
2004	(Finland) Tuomas Ketola	(Czech Republic) Lukáš Dlouhý	1–6, 6–4, 6–3
2005	(Netherlands) Raemon Sluiter	(France) Nicolas Thomann	6–3, 7–5

=== Women's singles ===
Year	Champion	Runner-up	Score
2005	(Poland) Agnieszka Radwańska	(Czech Republic) Lucie Hradecká	6–3, 3–6, 7–6^{(7–5)}

=== Men's doubles ===
Year	Champions	Runners-up	Score
2003	(Czech Republic) Martin Štěpánek (Slovakia) Igor Zelenay (1)	(Germany) Karsten Braasch (Switzerland) Jean-Claude Scherrer	6–4, 4–6, 6–4
2004	(Czech Republic) Lukáš Dlouhý (Slovakia) Igor Zelenay (2)	(Czech Republic) Jan Minář (Czech Republic) Jaroslav Pospíšil	6–3, 3–6, 7–6^{(7–5)}
2005	(Slovakia) Filip Polášek (Ukraine) Sergiy Stakhovsky	(United Kingdom) James Auckland (Netherlands) Jasper Smit	6–3, 3–6, 7–6^{(7–5)}

=== Women's doubles ===
Year	Champions	Runners-up	Score
2005	(Czech Republic) Lucie Hradecká (Czech Republic) Libuše Průšová	(Czech Republic) Olga Vymetálková (Czech Republic) Eva Hrdinová	6–3, 3–6, 6–3

== See also ==
- Neridé Prague Indoor
