= Smidary =

- Municipality
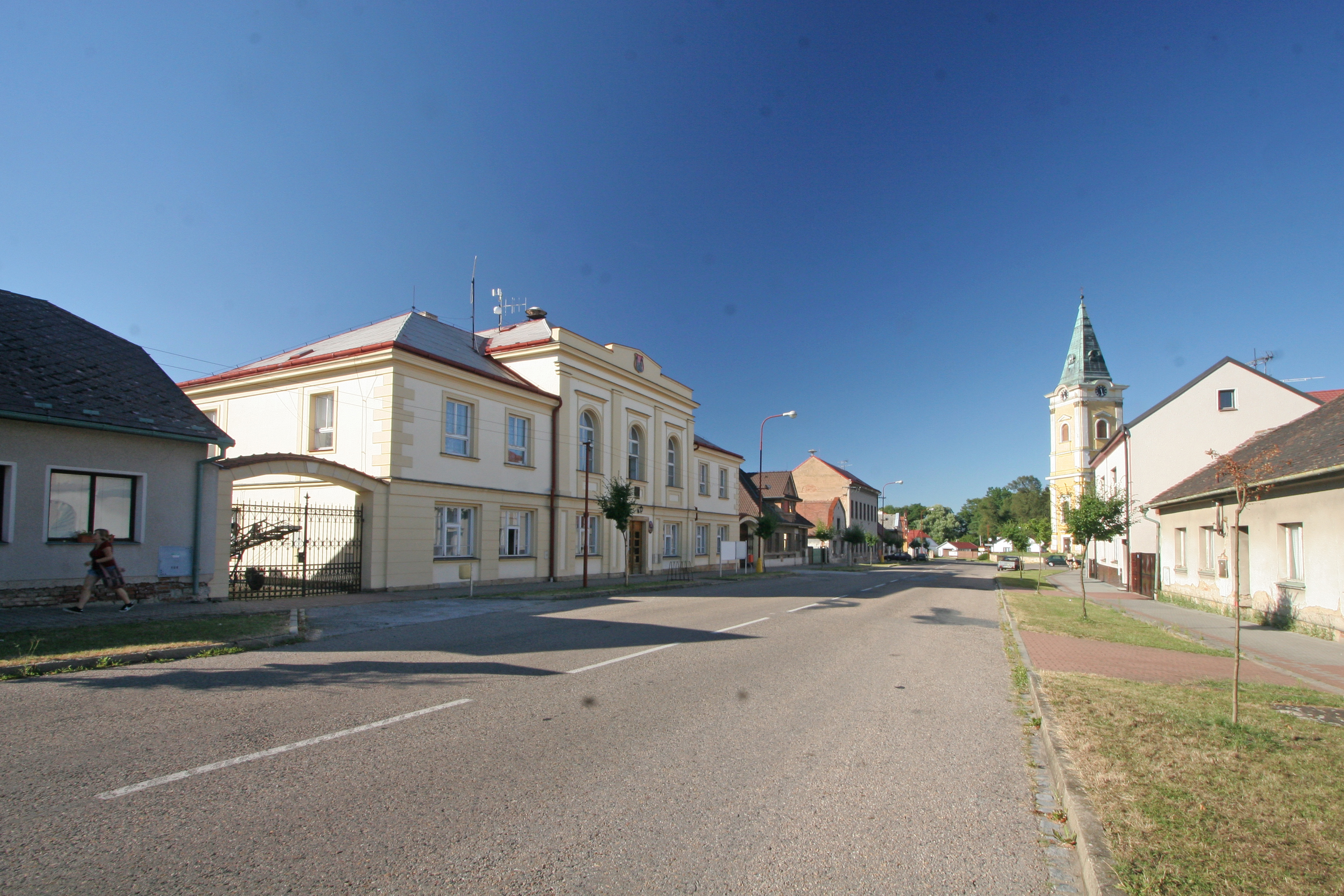
- Centre of Smidary

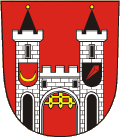
- Coat of arms

- Location in the Czech Republic
- Coordinates: 50°17′29″N 15°28′38″E
- Country: Czech Republic
- Region: Hradec Králové
- District: Hradec Králové
- First mentioned: 1332

Area
  - Total: 27.97 km^{2} (10.80 sq mi)
- Elevation: 238 m (781 ft)

Population (2026-01-01)
  - Total: 1,557
  - Density: 55.67/km^{2} (144.2/sq mi)
- Time zone: UTC+1 (CET)
  - Summer (DST): UTC+2 (CEST)
- Postal code: 503 53
- Website: www.smidary.cz

Smidary is a municipality and village in Hradec Králové District in the Hradec Králové Region of the Czech Republic. It has about 1,600 inhabitants.

== Administrative division ==
Smidary consists of five municipal parts (in brackets population according to the 2021 census):

- Smidary (823)
- Červeněves (203)
- Chotělice (299)
- Křičov (96)
- Loučná Hora (105)

== Demographics ==
Historical population
Year	Pop.	±%
1869	3,395	—
1880	3,587	+5.7%
1890	3,626	+1.1%
1900	3,682	+1.5%
1910	3,796	+3.1%
1921	3,371	−11.2%
1930	3,038	−9.9%
1950	2,264	−25.5%
1961	2,245	−0.8%
1970	1,933	−13.9%
1980	1,735	−10.2%
1991	1,559	−10.1%
2001	1,507	−3.3%
2011	1,516	+0.6%
2021	1,526	+0.7%
Source: Censuses
