= Daniela Kix =

Austrian tennis player

- Country (sports): Austria
- Born: 11 November 1984 (age 40); Stockerau, Austria
- Turned pro: 2000
- Retired: 2009
- Plays: Right-handed (two-handed backhand)
- Prize money: $70,031

Singles
- Career record: 136–106
- Career titles: 3 ITF
- Highest ranking: No. 190 (15 May 2006)

Grand Slam singles results
- French Open: Q2 (2006)
- Wimbledon: Q1 (2006)
- US Open: Q1 (2006)

Doubles
- Career record: 32–33
- Career titles: 2 ITF
- Highest ranking: No. 341 (15 November 2004)

Daniela Kix (born 4 May 1983) is a former Austrian tennis player.

Her career-high WTA rankings are 190 in singles, which she reached on 15 May 2006, and 341 in doubles, attained on 15 November 2004. In her career, she won a total of five titles on tournaments of the ITF Circuit.

Kix qualified for the 2006 Bangalore Open and lost in the first round. She lost to Svetlana Kuznetsova in Moscow and Elena Baltacha in London.

== ITF Circuit finals ==
$100,000 tournaments
$75,000 tournaments
$50,000 tournaments
$25,000 tournaments
$10,000 tournaments

=== Singles: 6 (3 titles, 3 runner-ups) ===
Result	No.	Date	Tournament	Surface	Opponent	Score
Loss	1	18 February 2002	ITF Istanbul, Turkey	Hard (i)	(Hungary) Eszter Molnár	2–6, 1–6
Win	2	19 August 2002	ITF Enschede, Netherlands	Clay	(Bulgaria) Dimana Krastevitch	6–2, 7–5
Win	3	4 August 2003	ITF Gdynia, Poland	Clay	(Ukraine) Kateryna Bondarenko	5–7, 7–5, 6–3
Win	4	29 May 2005	ITF Shanghai, China	Hard	(Thailand) Suchanun Viratprasert	7–6^{(6)}, 6–3
Loss	5	5 June 2005	ITF Nanjing, China	Hard	(China) Xie Yan-ze	2–6, 2–6
Loss	6	12 October 2005	ITF Jersey, United Kingdom	Hard (i)	(United Kingdom) Elena Baltacha	4–6, 4–6

=== Doubles: 3 (2 titles, 1 runner-up) ===
Result	No.	Date	Tournament	Surface	Partner	Opponents	Score
Win	1	19 August 2002	ITF Enschede, Netherlands	Clay	(Germany) Annette Kolb	(Austria) Daniela Klemenschits (Netherlands) Debby Haak	6–1, 7–5
Loss	2	19 April 2004	ITF Hvar, Croatia	Clay	(Bosnia and Herzegovina) Sandra Martinović	(Czech Republic) Tereza Veverková (Czech Republic) Zuzana Černá	6–4, 4–6, 6–7
Win	3	11 October 2005	ITF Bolton, Great Britain	Hard (i)	(Portugal) Neuza Silva	(Czech Republic) Veronika Chvojková (United Kingdom) Claire Peterzan	6–0, 6–2
