= Evgenia Grebenyuk =

Russian tennis player

- Country (sports): Russia
- Born: 10 February 1988 (age 37)
- Retired: 2008
- Plays: Right-handed (two-handed backhand)
- Prize money: $34,557

Singles
- Career record: 65–55
- Career titles: 1 ITF
- Highest ranking: No. 238 (11 June 2007)

Grand Slam singles results
- French Open Junior: 2R (2004)
- Wimbledon Junior: 2R (2004)

Doubles
- Career record: 22–27
- Highest ranking: No. 320 (24 March 2008)

Grand Slam doubles results
- French Open Junior: 1R (2004, 2005)
- Wimbledon Junior: 2R (2005)

Evgenia Grebenyuk (born 10 February 1988) is a Russian former professional tennis player.

Grebenyuk has career-high WTA rankings of 238 in singles, achieved on 11 June 2007, and 238 in doubles, set on 24 March 2008. She has won 1 singles titles on the ITF Women's Circuit.

Grebenyuk made her only WTA Tour main draw appearance at the 2008 İstanbul Cup, partnering Czech Veronika Chvojková in the doubles. But First Round lost American Jill Craybas and Belarusian Olga Govortsova.

== ITF Finals ==
=== Singles (1 titles, 0 runner–ups) ===
Result	W–L	Date	Tournament	Tier	Surface	Opponent	Score
Win	1–0	Oct 2006	ITF Podolsk, Russia	25,000	Hard (i)	(Belarus) Ekaterina Dzehalevich	7–5, 7–6

== ITF junior results ==
=== Singles (2–3) ===
Legend (Win/Loss)
Category GA
Category G1
Category G2
Category G3
Category G4
Category G5

Outcome	No.	Date	Location	Surface	Opponent	Score
Runner-up	1.	July 2003	Giza, Egypt	Clay	(Spain) Eva Fernández Brugués	6–7, 1–6
Winner	2.	August 2003	Cairo, Egypt	Clay	(Chinese Taipei) Hsu Wen-hsin	6–7, 6–1, 6–3
Runner-up	3.	November 2003	Tampere, Finland	Carpet	(Russia) Regina Kulikova	6–7, 3–6
Winner	4.	January 2004	Bratislava, Slovakia	Carpet	(Russia) Evgeniya Rodina	6–2, 4–6, 7–5
Runner-up	5.	April 2004	Miramas, France	Clay	(China) Sun Shengnan	6–4, 1–6, 0–6

=== Doubles (0–4) ===
Outcome	No.	Date	Location	Surface	Partner	Opponents	Score
Runner-up	1.	May 2001	Tolyatti, Russia	Hard	(Russia) Anna Chakvetadze	(Belarus) Ekaterina Dzehalevich (Belarus) Natalia Yakimovich	6–7, 2–6
Runner-up	2.	July 2003	Giza, Egypt	Clay	(Russia) Vesna Dolonc	(Egypt) Aya El Akkad (Egypt) Miray Eshak	6–7, 1–6
Runner-up	3.	September 2003	Novi Sad, Serbia	Clay	(Ukraine) Katerina Polunina	(Israel) Maria Gugel (Russia) Natalia Rakhmanina	2–6, 6–4, 3–6
Runner-up	4.	July 2004	Wels, Austria	Clay	(Russia) Elena Chalova	(Czech Republic) Nikola Fraňková (Czech Republic) Kateřina Kramperová	6–4, 3–6, 0–4 ret.
