= 2005 ITF Women's Circuit =

Details

Achievements (singles)

The ITF Women's Circuit is the second-tier tour for women's professional tennis organised by the International Tennis Federation, and is the tier below the WTA Tour. In 2005, the ITF Women's Circuit included tournaments with prize money ranging from $10,000 to $75,000.

The ITF world champions in 2005 were Kim Clijsters (senior singles), Lisa Raymond / Samantha Stosur (senior doubles) and Victoria Azarenka (combined junior ranking).

== Tournament breakdown by region ==
Region	Number of events	Total prize money
Africa	13	$160,000
Asia	50	$1,155,000
Europe	221	$4,250,000
North America*	67	$2,065,000
Oceania	12	$250,000
South America	11	$125,000
Total	374	$8,005,000

*Includes data for Central America and the Caribbean.

== Singles titles by nation ==
Rank	Nation	Titles won
1.	Romania	26
2.	Czech Republic	24
=	Russia	24
4.	United States	23
5.	Italy	19
6.	Germany	18
7.	France	17
=	Spain	17
9.	Argentina	15
10.	Ukraine	13
11.	Japan	12
=	(United Kingdom) Great Britain	12
13.	Austria	11
14.	Croatia	10
15.	Chinese Taipei	9
16.	(South Korea) Korea	8
17.	Australia	7
=	China	7
19.	Bosnia and Herzegovina	6
=	Canada	6
=	(Slovakia) Slovak Republic	6
=	Sweden	6

This list displays only the top 22 nations in terms of singles titles wins.

== Sources ==
- List of ITF World Champions
- ITF prize money (1983–2008)
- ITF Pro Circuit Titles Won By Nations Players in 2005
