= Pip Ivan (Maramureș) =

Mountain in Ukraine

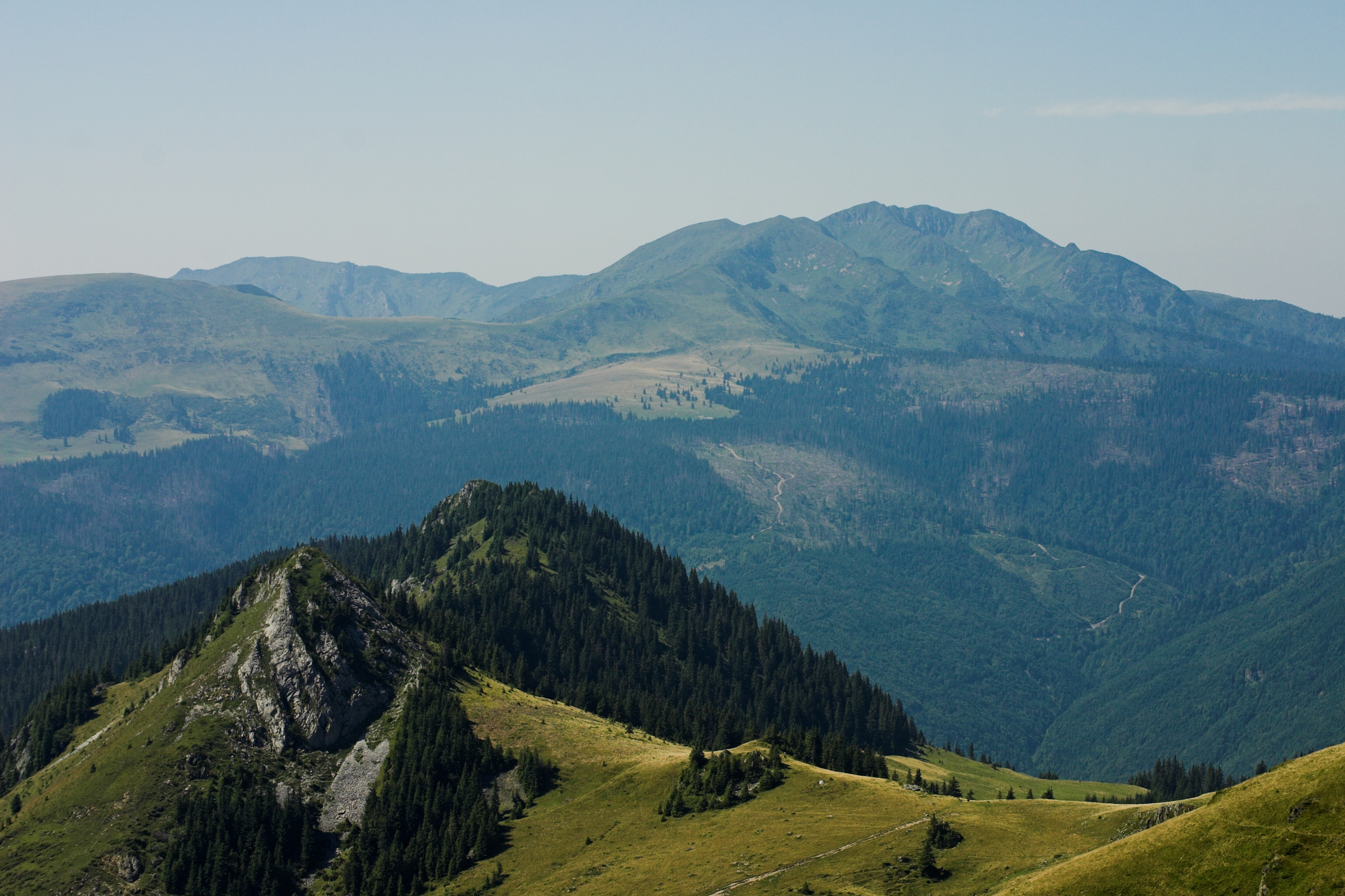

Highest point
- Elevation: 1,938 m (6,358 ft)
- Coordinates: 48°05′30″N 24°35′45″E

Geography
- Location within Ukraine Location within Romania
- Parent range: Carpathian Mountains

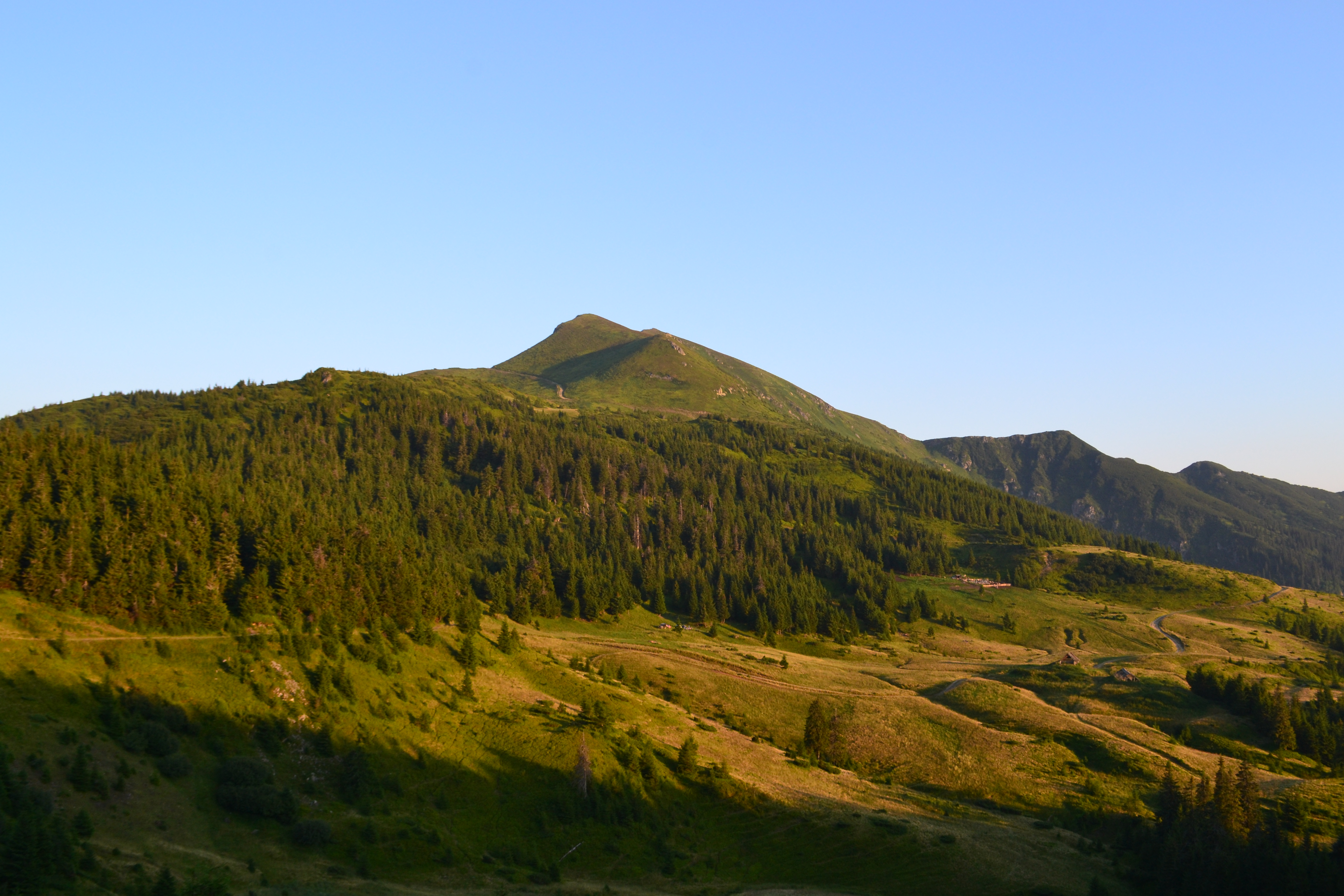
Pip Ivan from north direction

Pip Ivan (Ukrainian: Піп Іван, Romanian: Pop Ivan) is a peak in the Maramureș region on the Ukrainian-Romanian border, with a height of 1,938 meters (6,358 ft) above sea level.
