= Martin Štěpánek (tennis) =

Czech tennis player (born 1979)

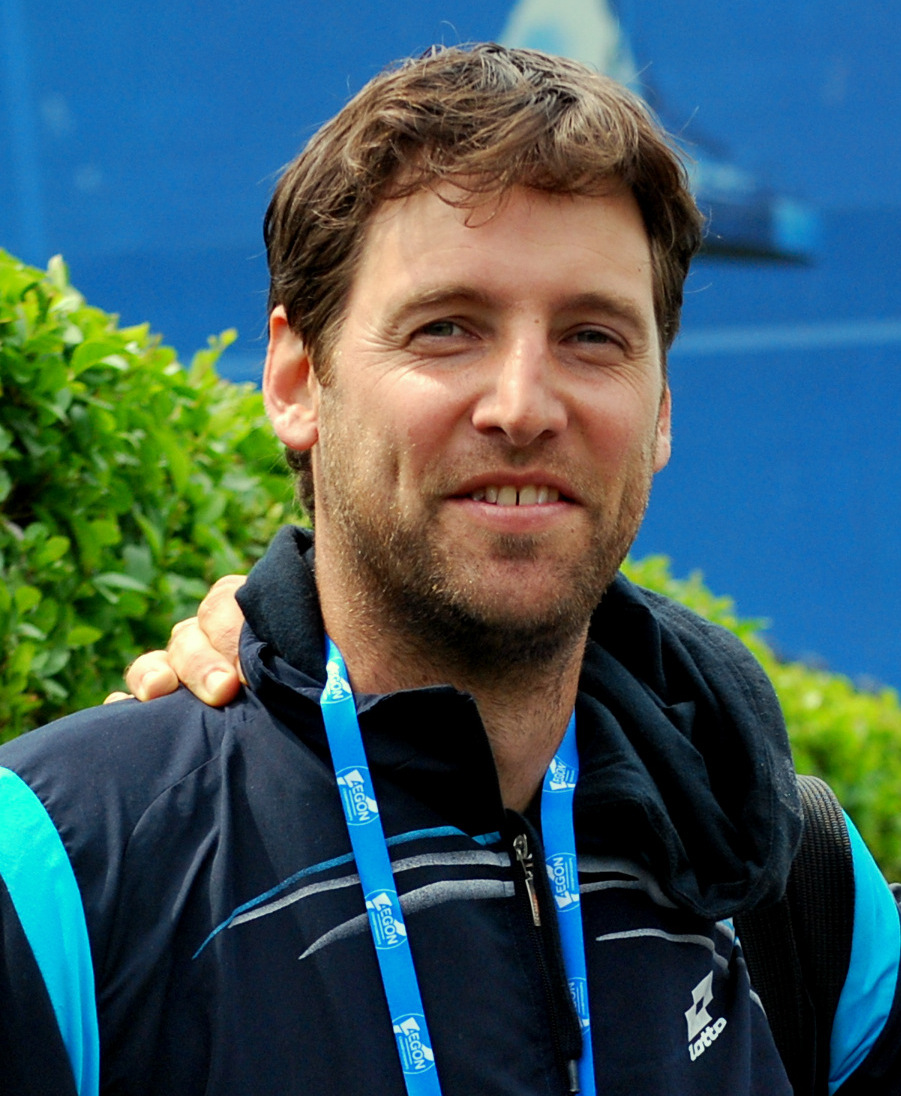
- Full name: Martin Štěpánek
- Country (sports): Czech Republic
- Residence: Prague, Czech Republic
- Born: 13 December 1979 (age 46) Havana, Cuba
- Prize money: $82,685

Singles
- Highest ranking: No. 248 (25 August 2003)

Grand Slam singles results
- Wimbledon: Q1 (1999, 2004)

Doubles
- Highest ranking: No. 102 (26 September 2005)

Coaching career
- Ivan Dodig; Lukáš Dlouhý; Frederico Gil; Tomáš Berdych; Borna Ćorić; Sebastian Korda; Patrik Rikl

Martin Štěpánek (born 13 December 1979) is a tennis coach and former professional player from the Czech Republic.

== Biography ==
The son of teachers, Blanka and Ludek Štěpánek, he was born in Havana, Cuba. He also lived in Mexico growing up in the 1980s.

Štěpánek, who is not related to Radek Štěpánek, has one brother.

=== Playing career ===
At an ITF Futures event in the Czech Republic in 2001, Štěpánek had a win over Tomáš Berdych in what was the future world number four's first appearance on tour.

In 2003 he won the Mordovia Cup, a tournament on the ATP Challenger circuit.

He won eight Challenger doubles titles, five of them in 2005, a year he reached a career high 102 in the world.

=== Coaching ===
A shoulder injury ended his career at the end of the 2005 season and he made the move into coaching.

Based in Prague, he is best known as the coach of Croatian player Ivan Dodig. During their time together, Dodig made it to 29 in the world in singles and 4 in doubles.

He has also coached Lukáš Dlouhý to two Grand Slam doubles titles and worked with Frederico Gil when he was a coach at the Break Point Academy in Halle, Germany.

Since 2018 he was the coach of Tomáš Berdych until his retirement in 2019.

He started coaching Borna Ćorić at the end of 2019 till 2022.

He is currently coaching Sebastian Korda and Patrik Rikl.

== Challenger titles ==
=== Singles: (1) ===
Year	Tournament	Surface	Opponent	Score
2003	Mordovia, Russia	Clay	(Slovakia) Michal Mertiňák	6–1, 6–1

=== Doubles: (8) ===
Year	Tournament	Surface	Partner	Opponents	Score
2003	Mordovia, Russia	Clay	(Hungary) Kornél Bardóczky	(Poland) Łukasz Kubot (Ukraine) Orest Tereshchuk	7–6^{(3)}, 6–3
2003	Prague, Czech Republic	Carpet	(Slovakia) Igor Zelenay	(Germany) Karsten Braasch (Switzerland) Jean-Claude Scherrer	6–4, 4–6, 6–4
2004	Manerbio, Italy	Clay	(Czech Republic) Petr Luxa	(Sweden) Johan Landsberg (Netherlands) Rogier Wassen	6–4, 6–2
2005	Wrocław, Poland	Hard	(Czech Republic) Lukáš Dlouhý	(United States) Jason Marshall (United States) Huntley Montgomery	6–2, 5–7, 6–4
2005	Lübeck, Germany	Carpet	(Czech Republic) Pavel Šnobel	(Germany) Philipp Petzschner (Germany) Lars Uebel	7–6^{(5)}, 5–7, 7–5
2005	Ostrava, Czech Republic	Clay	(Czech Republic) Pavel Šnobel	(Czech Republic) Tomáš Cibulec (Poland) Mariusz Fyrstenberg	7–6^{(1)}, 2–6, 7–6^{(4)}
2005	Rimini, Italy	Clay	(Czech Republic) David Škoch	(Germany) Christopher Kas (Germany) Philipp Petzschner	6–3, 6–7^{(1)}, 6–1
2005	Freudenstadt, Germany	Clay	(Czech Republic) Pavel Šnobel	(Germany) Sebastian Fitz (Germany) Simon Greul	6–2, 6–4
