= Pavel Šnobel =

Czech tennis player (born 1980)

- Country (sports): Czech Republic
- Residence: Ostrava, Czech Republic
- Born: 28 February 1980 (age 45) Havířov, Czechoslovakia
- Height: 1.90 m (6 ft 3 in)
- Turned pro: 1997
- Plays: Left-handed (two-handed backhand)
- Prize money: $377,192
- Official website: pavelsnobel.com

Singles
- Career record: 0–4
- Career titles: 0
- Highest ranking: No. 154 (23 February 2009)

Grand Slam singles results
- Australian Open: 1R (2006)
- French Open: Q1 (2003, 2005, 2006, 2007)
- Wimbledon: 1R (2008)
- US Open: Q1 (2003, 2005, 2007, 2009)

Doubles
- Career record: 0–1
- Career titles: 0
- Highest ranking: No. 110 (20 February 2006)
Medal record
Representing Czech Republic
Summer Universiade
| Gold medal – first place | 2007 Bangkok | Mixed Doubles |

Pavel Šnobel (born 28 February 1980) is a left-handed, Czech former tennis player. He reached his career-high rankings of world No. 154 in singles February 2009 and No. 110 in doubles in February 2006.

== Juniors career ==
Šnobel was year-end No. 131 in 1997 in the junior world rankings.

== Professional career ==
In 2008, Šnobel won Croatia F2 in February and reached a Challenger semifinal in March in Sarajevo, and a Challenger quarterfinal in Korea in April. But his ranking slipped back down below 300 by April. In Uzbekistan in May, he won the Challenger in Fergana a week after being runner-up in Uzbekistan F2, to improve his ranking back to No. 219.

In June, Šnobel qualified in singles for the 2008 Wimbledon Championships, beating No. 159 Dušan Vemić, No. 474 Antony Dupuis, and No. 130 Flavio Cipolla.
