= Průhonice =

- Municipality
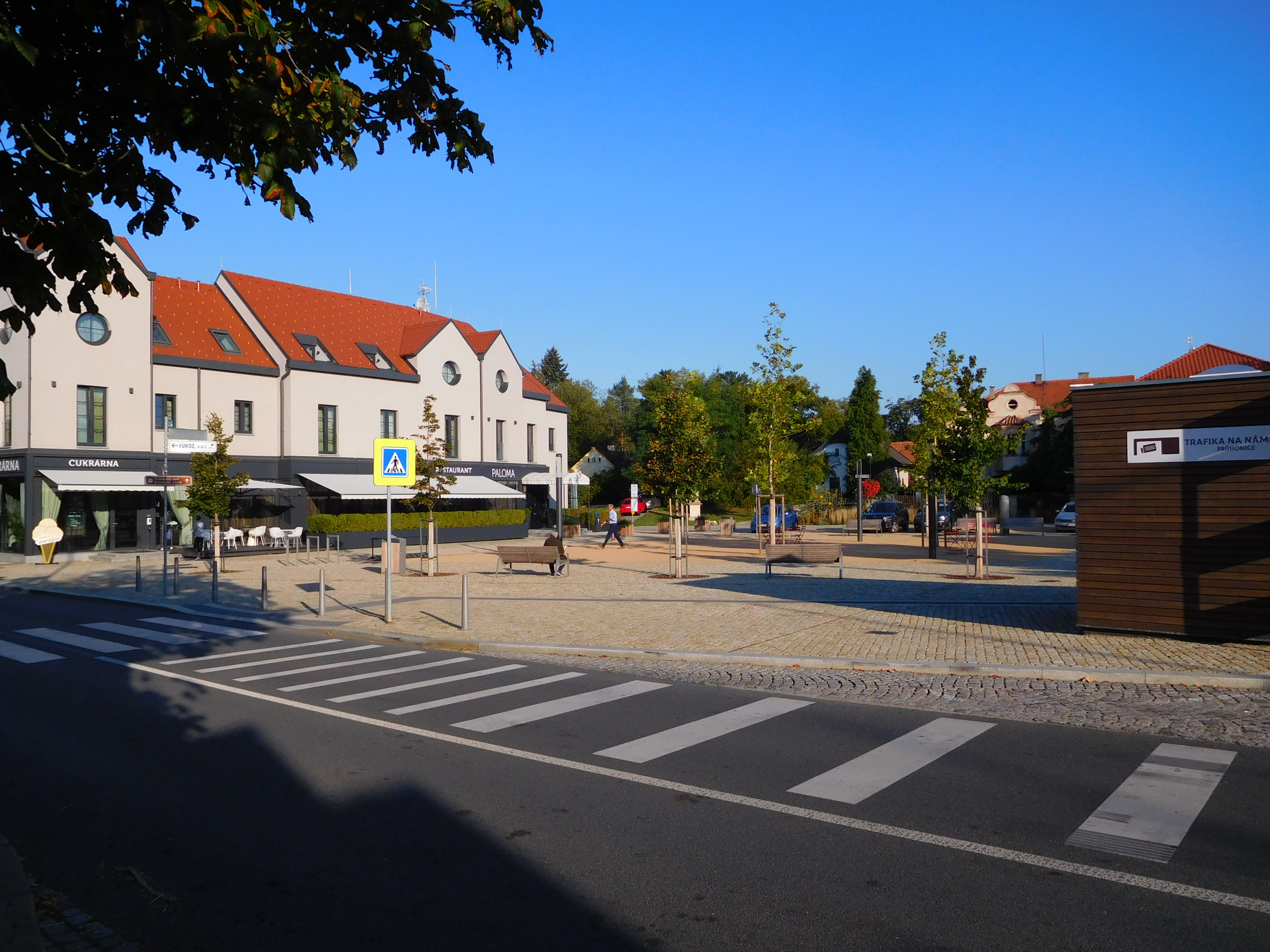
- Centre of Průhonice

- Location in the Czech Republic
- Coordinates: 50°0′6″N 14°33′37″E
- Country: Czech Republic
- Region: Central Bohemian
- District: Prague-West
- First mentioned: 1187

Area
  - Total: 7.69 km^{2} (2.97 sq mi)
- Elevation: 306 m (1,004 ft)

Population (2026-01-01)
  - Total: 2,867
  - Density: 373/km^{2} (966/sq mi)
- Time zone: UTC+1 (CET)
  - Summer (DST): UTC+2 (CEST)
- Postal code: 252 43
- Website: www.pruhonice-obec.cz

Průhonice (Czech pronunciation: [ˈpruːɦoɲɪtsɛ]) is a municipality and village in Prague-West District in the Central Bohemian Region of the Czech Republic. It has about 2,900 inhabitants. The town is located on the Botič Stream in the Prague Plateau.

Průhonice is known for the Průhonice Castle and its castle park. The castle complex is protected as a national cultural monument and the park is also a UNESCO World Heritage Site.

== Administrative division ==
Průhonice consists of two municipal parts (in brackets population according to the 2021 census):

- Průhonice (2,857)
- Rozkoš (66)

== Etymology ==
The name is derived from the Czech word průhon (denoting a path used to drive cattle to pasture or to a watering place). The name means "the village founded on průhons".

== Geography ==
Průhonice is located about 4 kilometres (2 mi) southeast of Prague. It lies in a flat landscape in the Prague Plateau. The Botič Stream flows through the municipality. The municipal territory is rich in small fishponds.

== History ==
The first written mention of Průhonice is from 1187, when the Church of the Nativity of the Virgin Mary was consecrated. The first documented owners of the village are from the 1270s, when it was the property of a family that called itself the Lords of Průhonice. In the 14th century, Průhonice was owned by the Lords of Říčany. In the 16th century, Průhonice was owned by the Zapský of Zápy family. They had rebuilt the local castle into a Renaissance aristocratic residence.

The estate flourished in the 18th century, when it was owned by the Desfours family. In the 19th century, Průhonice was the property of the Nostitz-Rieneck family. Johann Nepomuk von Nostitz-Rieneck has completely rebuilt the Průhonice Castle in the Neoclassical style.

== Demographics ==
Historical population

Year	Pop.	±%
1869	722	—
1880	796	+10.2%
1890	872	+9.5%
1900	939	+7.7%
1910	895	−4.7%

Year	Pop.	±%
1921	909	+1.6%
1930	984	+8.3%
1950	1,041	+5.8%
1961	1,096	+5.3%
1970	1,263	+15.2%

Year	Pop.	±%
1980	1,586	+25.6%
1991	1,589	+0.2%
2001	1,948	+22.6%
2011	2,974	+52.7%
2021	2,923	−1.7%

Source: Censuses

== Transport ==
The D1 motorway from Prague to Brno runs through Průhonice. On 1 January 2023, the 5.2 km (3.2 mi) long section of the D1 motorway from Prague to Průhonice was reclassified to a first class road.

== Sights ==
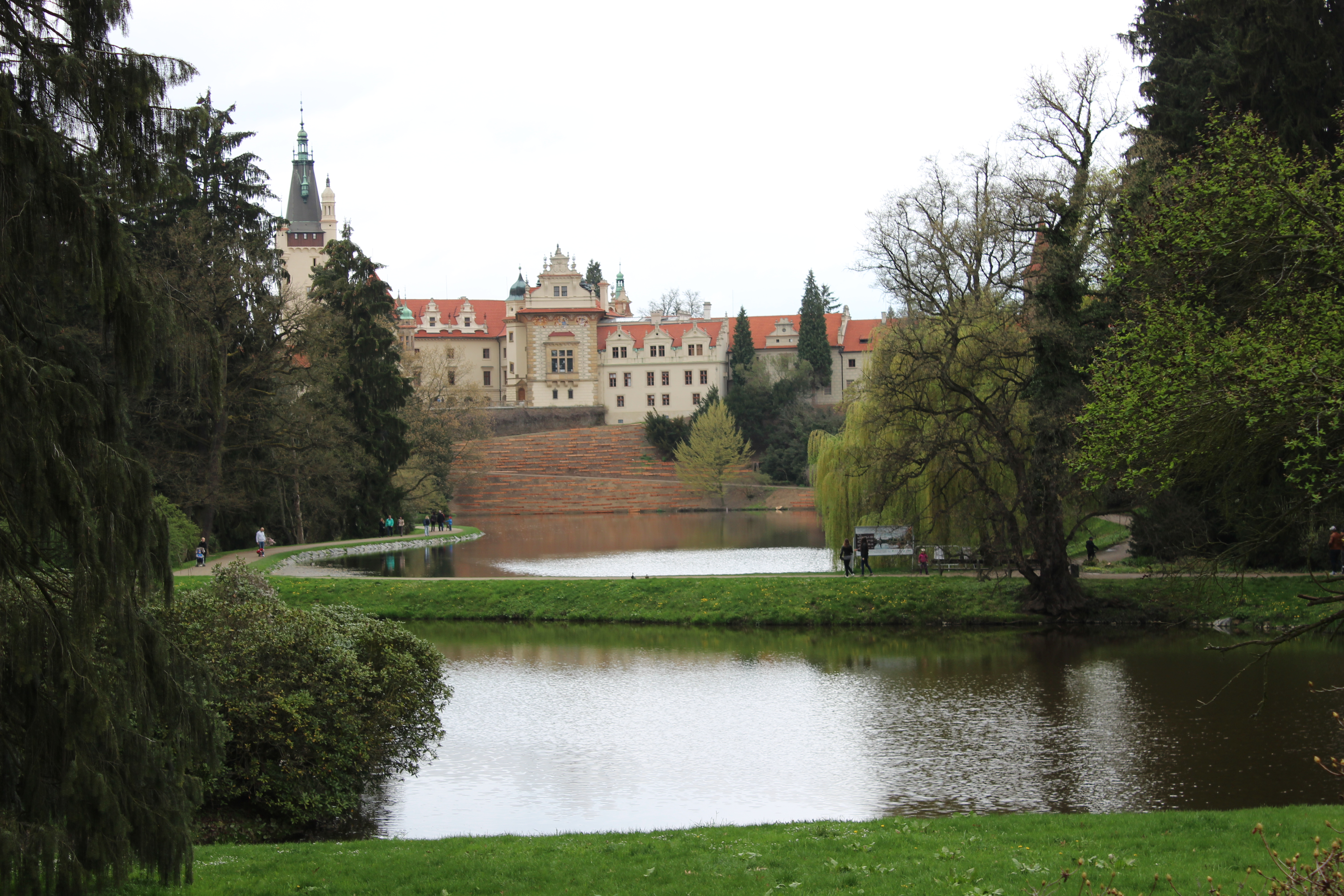
Průhonice Castle and its park

The most important monument is the Průhonice Castle and its park. It is one of the most significant castle parks in the Czech Republic. Since 2010, the castle complex has been protected as a national cultural monument. Later in 2010, the castle park also became a UNESCO World Heritage Site (as part of Historic Centre of Prague). The park is described as "original masterpiece of garden landscape architecture of worldwide importance". It has area of 250 hectares (620 acres), of which 211.42 hectares (522.4 acres) is UNESCO World Heritage Site. It was founded in 1885 by Count Arnošt Emanuel Silva Tarouca.

The castle's current appearance is a result of the Neo-Renaissance reconstruction in 1889–1894. Since 1927, it has been owned by the state. It is home to the Institute of Botany of the Academy of Sciences of the Czech Republic.

The Church of the Nativity of the Virgin Mary is located in the park. It is the oldest preserved building in the municipality. This Romanesque church was extended in the Gothic style after 1300, and further modified during the Baroque era.

The Dendrological Garden was founded in the 1970s. It has an area of 73 ha (180 acres). There are about 5,000 taxa of woody plants and perennials, which makes it one of the largest collections of ornamental plants in the country.

== Notable people ==
- Andrej Babiš (born 1954), politician and businessman; lives here
