= 2009 Riviera di Rimini Challenger – Doubles =

Doubles
- 2009 Riviera di Rimini Challenger

Final
- Champions: (Germany) Matthias Bachinger (Germany) Dieter Kindlmann
- Runners-up: (Italy) Leonardo Azzaro (Italy) Marco Crugnola
- Score: 6–4, 6–2

Events
Singles	Doubles
← 2008 ·	Riviera di Rimini Challenger	· 2010 →

Matthias Bachinger and Dieter Kindlmann won the final 6–4, 6–2, against Azzaro and Crugnola (who were the defending champions).

== Seeds ==
1. (Italy) Leonardo Azzaro / (Italy) Marco Crugnola (final)
2. (Spain) Carles Poch-Gradin / (Spain) Pablo Santos (first round)
3. (Czech Republic) Dušan Karol / (Czech Republic) Jaroslav Pospíšil (first round)
4. (Italy) Daniele Bracciali / (Netherlands) Jesse Huta Galung (first round)

== Draw ==
=== Key ===
- Q = Qualifier
- WC = Wild card
- LL = Lucky loser
- Alt = Alternate
- SE = Special exempt
- PR = Protected ranking
- ITF = ITF entry
- JE = Junior exempt
- w/o = Walkover
- r = Retired
- d = Defaulted
- SR = Special ranking

=== Draw ===
First round
1	(Italy) L Azzaro (Italy) M Crugnola
(Argentina) JI Chela (Spain) R Ramírez Hidalgo	w/o
(France) T Ascione (France) R Jouan	6	6
(Brazil) T Bellucci (Czech Republic) D Lojda	3	1
3	(Czech Republic) D Karol (Czech Republic) J Pospíšil	3	6	[6]
(Italy) P Lorenzi (Italy) G Petrazzuolo	6	3	[10]
(Italy) A Motti (France) S Robert	6^{2}	6	[15]
WC	(Italy) A Biasella (Italy) M Dell'Acqua	7	1	[13]
(Belgium) N Desein (Russia) D Sitak	6	6
(Romania) F Mergea (Romania) G Moraru	2	2
(Italy) G Naso (Italy) W Trusendi	6	7
4	(Italy) D Bracciali (Netherlands) J Huta Galung	4	5
(Germany) M Bachinger (Germany) D Kindlmann	6	7
WC	(Italy) A Comporto (Italy) G Di Meo	2	6^{6}
WC	(Italy) T Fabbiano (Italy) M Trevisan	6	6
2	(Spain) C Poch-Gradin (Spain) P Santos	0	2

Quarterfinals
1	(Italy) L Azzaro (Italy) M Crugnola	6	6
(France) T Ascione (France) R Jouan	4	3
(Italy) P Lorenzi (Italy) G Petrazzuolo	6	2	[8]
(Italy) A Motti (France) S Robert	3	6	[10]
(Belgium) N Desein (Russia) D Sitak	4	2
(Italy) G Naso (Italy) W Trusendi	6	6
(Germany) M Bachinger (Germany) D Kindlmann	4	6	[10]
WC	(Italy) T Fabbiano (Italy) M Trevisan	6	3	[8]

Semifinals
1	(Italy) L Azzaro (Italy) M Crugnola	6	6
(Italy) A Motti (France) S Robert	4	4
(Italy) G Naso (Italy) W Trusendi	5	6	[10]
(Germany) M Bachinger (Germany) D Kindlmann	7	4	[12]

Finals
1	(Italy) L Azzaro (Italy) M Crugnola	4	2
(Germany) M Bachinger (Germany) D Kindlmann	6	6
