= 2004 Czech Indoor Open – Singles =

Singles
- 2004 Czech Indoor Open

Final
- Champion: (Finland) Tuomas Ketola
- Runner-up: (Czech Republic) Lukáš Dlouhý
- Score: 1–6, 6–4, 6–3

Events
Singles	Doubles
- Czech Indoor Open

The 2004 Czech Indoor Open Open was a men's tennis tournament played on indoor hard courts in Průhonice, Czech Republic, and was part of the 2004 ATP Challenger Series.

This was the second edition of the event and was held from 23 to 28 November 2004.

The defending champion Mario Ančić didn't enlist into this edition.

Tuomas Ketola, at his first participation in the tournament, won in the final 1–6, 6–4, 6–3, against Lukáš Dlouhý.

== Seeds ==
1. (Switzerland) Ivo Heuberger (second round)
2. (Italy) Daniele Bracciali (first round)
3. (Belgium) Dick Norman (first round)
4. (Czech Republic) Jan Vacek (first round)
5. (Germany) Dieter Kindlmann (semifinals)
6. (United Kingdom) Alex Bogdanović (second round)
7. (Kazakhstan) Yuri Schukin (quarterfinals)
8. (Italy) Federico Luzzi (first round)

== Draw ==
Key

- Q = Qualifier
- WC = Wild card
- LL = Lucky loser
- Alt = Alternate
- ITF = ITF entry
- PR = Protected ranking
- SR = Special ranking
- SE = Special exempt
- JE = Junior exempt
- JR = Junior Accelerator Programme entrant
- CO = College Accelerator Programme entrant
- NG = Next Gen Accelerator Program entrant
- w/o = Walkover
- r = Retired
- d = Defaulted

=== Finals ===
Semifinals
(Finland) Tuomas Ketola	7	3	6
5	(Germany) Dieter Kindlmann	6^{4}	6	2
(Russia) K Ivanov-Smolensky	1	4
(Czech Republic) Lukáš Dlouhý	6	6

Final
(Finland) Tuomas Ketola	1	6	6
(Czech Republic) Lukáš Dlouhý	6	4	3

=== Top half ===
First round
1	(Switzerland) Ivo Heuberger	6	6
(Austria) Julian Knowle	3	4
(Ukraine) S Yaroshenko	3	6	6
(Croatia) Lovro Zovko	6	3	3
(Finland) Tuomas Ketola	7	6
(Czech Republic) Pavel Šnobel	6^{4}	3
(United Kingdom) R Bloomfield	6	6
8	(Italy) Federico Luzzi	3	4
(Japan) Takao Suzuki	6	6
4	(Czech Republic) Jan Vacek	2	2
(Croatia) Ivan Cerović	6	6
(Italy) Daniele Giorgini	1	4
(Germany) Sebastian Fitz	6	7
(Serbia) Nenad Zimonjić	4	6^{3}
5	(Germany) Dieter Kindlmann	6	6
(Slovakia) Milan Petercak	1	4

Second round
1	(Switzerland) Ivo Heuberger	6	6^{5}	5
(Ukraine) S Yaroshenko	2	7	7
(Finland) Tuomas Ketola	6	6
(United Kingdom) R Bloomfield	2	2
(Japan) Takao Suzuki	6	6
(Croatia) Ivan Cerović	4	2
(Germany) Sebastian Fitz	2	4
5	(Germany) Dieter Kindlmann	6	6

Quarterfinals
(Ukraine) S Yaroshenko	3	3
(Finland) Tuomas Ketola	6	6
(Japan) Takao Suzuki	6	2	3
5	(Germany) Dieter Kindlmann	2	6	6

Semifinals
(Finland) Tuomas Ketola	7	3	6
5	(Germany) Dieter Kindlmann	6^{4}	6	2

=== Bottom half ===
First round
7	(Kazakhstan) Yuri Schukin	6	7
(Ukraine) S Stakhovsky	4	6^{2}
(Czech Republic) J Pospíšil	6	6
(Netherlands) B Beszelsen	3	2
(Russia) K Ivanov-Smolensky	6^{3}	6	7
(Italy) M Dell'Acqua	7	4	6^{3}
(Czech Republic) Martin Štěpánek	7	6
3	(Belgium) Dick Norman	6^{0}	3
6	(United Kingdom) Alex Bogdanović	6	1	6
(Slovakia) Roman Kukal	4	6	3
(Czech Republic) Jan Minář	7	6
(France) Jérôme Golmard	6^{8}	3
(Czech Republic) Lukáš Dlouhý	6	6
(Italy) Simone Vagnozzi	3	2
(Slovakia) Igor Zelenay	6	6
2	(Italy) D Bracciali	2	2

Second round
7	(Kazakhstan) Yuri Schukin	6	7
(Czech Republic) J Pospíšil	2	6^{5}
(Russia) K Ivanov-Smolensky	7	5	6
(Czech Republic) Martin Štěpánek	6^{4}	7	3
6	(United Kingdom) Alex Bogdanović	2	3
(Czech Republic) Jan Minář	6	6
(Czech Republic) Lukáš Dlouhý	6	6
(Slovakia) Igor Zelenay	3	2

Quarterfinals
7	(Kazakhstan) Yuri Schukin	6	3	6^{3}
(Russia) K Ivanov-Smolensky	1	6	7
(Czech Republic) Jan Minář	3	4
(Czech Republic) Lukáš Dlouhý	6	6

Semifinals
(Russia) K Ivanov-Smolensky	1	4
(Czech Republic) Lukáš Dlouhý	6	6
