= 2004 ATP Challenger Series =

Tennis tour

Details
- Duration: 5 January 2004 – 12 December 2004
- Edition: 27th
- Tournaments: 146

Achievements (singles)

The ATP Challenger Series is the second-tier tour for professional tennis organised by the Association of Tennis Professionals (ATP). The 2004 calendar comprised 146 tournaments, with prize money ranging from $25,000 to $150,000.

== Schedule ==
=== January ===
Date	Country	Tournament	Prizemoney	Surface	Singles champion	Doubles champions
05.01.	Brazil	São Paulo Challenger I	$ 50,000	Hard	(Argentina) Juan Mónaco	(Paraguay) Ramón Delgado (Brazil) André Sá
26.01.	Germany	Heilbronn Open	$ 100,000	Carpet (i)	(Belgium) Gilles Elseneer	(Poland) Mariusz Fyrstenberg (Poland) Marcin Matkowski
26.01.	United States	Hilton Waikoloa Village USTA Challenger	$ 50,000	Hard	(Russia) Dmitry Tursunov	(United States) Scott Humphries (United States) Brian Vahaly

=== February ===
Date	Country	Tournament	Prizemoney	Surface	Singles champion	Doubles champions
02.02.	Poland	Wroclaw Challenger	$ 150,000	Hard (i)	(Slovakia) Karol Beck	(Slovakia) Dominik Hrbatý (Germany) Michael Kohlmann
02.02.	United States	Challenger of Dallas	$ 50,000	Hard (i)	(France) Sébastien de Chaunac	(Australia) Jordan Kerr (Australia) Todd Perry
02.02.	Serbia and Montenegro	Belgrade Challenger	$ 25,000	Carpet (i)	(Serbia and Montenegro) Nenad Zimonjić	(Slovakia) Branislav Sekáč (Ukraine) Orest Tereshchuk
02.02.	Germany	Volkswagen Challenger	$ 25,000	Carpet (i)	(Czech Republic) Michal Tabara	(Sweden) Robert Lindstedt (Switzerland) Jean-Claude Scherrer
09.02.	France	Cherbourg Challenger	$ 50,000	Hard (i)	(France) Julien Jeanpierre	(Slovakia) Michal Mertiňák (Germany) Alexander Waske
09.02.	United States	Joplin Challenger	$ 50,000	Hard (i)	(Chinese Taipei) Lu Yen-hsun	(Chinese Taipei) Lu Yen-hsun (Brazil) Bruno Soares
16.02.	France	Challenger 42	$ 100,000	Hard (i)	(France) Julien Benneteau	(Switzerland) Yves Allegro (France) Jean-François Bachelot
23.02.	Vietnam	Heineken Challenger	$ 50,000	Hard	(United Kingdom) Arvind Parmar	(South Africa) Rik de Voest (Netherlands) Fred Hemmes

=== March ===
Date	Country	Tournament	Prizemoney	Surface	Singles champion	Doubles champions
01.03.	France	Besançon Challenger	$ 100,000	Hard (i)	(Czech Republic) Tomáš Berdych	(Germany) Alexander Waske (Netherlands) Rogier Wassen
01.03.	Japan	Kyōto Challenger	$ 25,000	Carpet (i)	(Czech Republic) Michal Tabara	(South Africa) Rik de Voest (Netherlands) Fred Hemmes
08.03.	Colombia	Bogotá Challenger	$ 25,000	Clay	(Colombia) Alejandro Falla	(Colombia) Sebastián Quintero (Colombia) Óscar Rodríguez
08.03.	Great Britain	Wrexham Challenger	$ 25,000	Hard (i)	(Netherlands) Dennis van Scheppingen	(Czech Republic) Jaroslav Levinský (Germany) Alexander Waske
15.03.	Mexico	Mexico City Challenger	$ 125,000	Clay	(Germany) Florian Mayer	(Australia) Ashley Fisher (United States) Tripp Phillips
15.03.	United States	Boca Raton Challenger	$ 100,000	Hard	(Austria) Jürgen Melzer	(Russia) Igor Andreev (Russia) Dmitry Tursunov
15.03.	Slovakia	Sarajevo Challenger	$ 25,000	Hard (i)	(Belgium) Gilles Elseneer	(Czech Republic) Jaroslav Levinský (Germany) Alexander Waske
22.03.	Italy	Cagliari Challenger	$ 25,000	Clay	(Spain) Didac Pérez	(Germany) Tomas Behrend (Italy) Giorgio Galimberti
22.03.	France	Saint-Brieuc Challenger	$ 25,000	Clay (i)	(France) Olivier Mutis	(Belgium) Christophe Rochus (Belgium) Tom Vanhoudt
22.03.	Australia	Tasmania Challenger	$ 25,000	Hard	(Chinese Taipei) Lu Yen-hsun	(South Africa) Rik de Voest (Chinese Taipei) Lu Yen-hsun
29.03.	South Korea	Busan Challenger	$ 37.500	Hard	(Austria) Alexander Peya	(Thailand) Sanchai Ratiwatana (Thailand) Sonchat Ratiwatana
29.03.	Italy	Barletta Challenger	$ 25,000	Clay	(Spain) Nicolás Almagro	(Spain) Marc López (Spain) Fernando Vicente
29.03.	Australia	Canberra Challenger	$ 25,000	Clay	(Australia) Peter Luczak	(Poland) Łukasz Kubot (Austria) Zbynek Mlynarik
29.03.	Ecuador	Salinas Challenger	$ 25,000	Hard	(Colombia) Alejandro Falla	(Argentina) Federico Browne (Pakistan) Aisam-ul-Haq Qureshi

=== April ===
Date	Country	Tournament	Prizemoney	Surface	Singles champion	Doubles champions
05.04.	Mexico	San Luis Potosí Challenger	$ 50,000	Clay	(Argentina) Mariano Delfino	(Finland) Tuomas Ketola (Netherlands) Rogier Wassen
05.04.	United States	Calabasas Challenger	$ 25,000	Hard	(Croatia) Ivo Karlović	(Serbia and Montenegro) Ilija Bozoljac (Serbia and Montenegro) Dušan Vemić
12.04.	Mexico	León Challenger	$ 25,000	Hard	(United States) Jeff Morrison	(Australia) Nathan Healey (Finland) Tuomas Ketola
12.04.	Italy	Olbia Challenger	$ 25,000	Clay	(Italy) Stefano Pescosolido	(Italy) Daniele Bracciali (Italy) Giorgio Galimberti
19.04.	Bermuda	Bermuda Challenger	$ 100,000	Clay	(Peru) Luis Horna	(Australia) Jordan Kerr (Belgium) Tom Vanhoudt
19.04.	Mexico	Mexiko City Challenger	$ 75,000	Hard	(Germany) Florian Mayer	(Australia) Ashley Fisher (United States) Tripp Phillips
19.04.	Spain	Barcelona Challenger	$ 25,000	Clay	(Switzerland) Stan Wawrinka	(Spain) Emilio Benfele Álvarez (Spain) Gabriel Trujillo Soler
19.04.	Italy	Naples Challenger	$ 25,000	Clay	(Luxembourg) Gilles Müller	(Germany) Tomas Behrend (Italy) Giorgio Galimberti
26.04.	France	Aix-en-Provence Challenger	$ 125,000	Clay	(France) Fabrice Santoro	(France) Thierry Ascione (France) Jean-François Bachelot
26.04.	Italy	Rome Challenger I	$ 25,000	Clay	(France) Nicolas Coutelot	(Hungary) Kornél Bardóczky (Hungary) Gergely Kisgyörgy

=== May ===
Date	Country	Tournament	Prizemoney	Surface	Singles champion	Doubles champions
03.05.	Czech Republic	Ostrava Challenger	$ 25,000	Clay	(Serbia and Montenegro) Janko Tipsarević	(Finland) Tuomas Ketola (Czech Republic) Petr Pála
10.05.	United States	Forest Hills Challenger	$ 50,000	Clay	(Argentina) Juan Pablo Guzmán	(United States) Jason Marshall (Brazil) Bruno Soares
10.05.	Croatia	Zagreb Challenger	$ 50,000	Clay	(Chile) Adrián García	(Slovakia) Karol Beck (Czech Republic) Jaroslav Levinský
10.05.	Slovakia	Košice Challenger	$ 25,000	Clay	(Australia) Peter Luczak	(United States) Devin Bowen (Australia) Peter Luczak
10.05.	Italy	Sanremo Challenger	$ 25,000	Clay	(Italy) Potito Starace	(Italy) Daniele Bracciali (Italy) Giorgio Galimberti
17.05.	Czech Republic	Prague Challenger I	$ 125,000	Clay	(Czech Republic) Jan Hernych	(Slovakia) Karol Kučera (Czech Republic) Cyril Suk
17.05.	Hungary	Budapest Challenger	$ 25,000	Clay	(France) Stéphane Robert	(Argentina) Juan Pablo Brzezicki (Argentina) Mariano Delfino
17.05.	Uzbekistan	Fergana Challenger	$ 25,000	Hard	(Russia) Igor Kunitsyn	(Netherlands) Raven Klaasen (Netherlands Antilles) Jean-Julien Rojer
24.05.	Slovenia	Ljubljana Challenger	$ 25,000	Clay	(Czech Republic) Jiří Vaněk	(Ecuador) Giovanni Lapentti (South Africa) Rik de Voest
24.05.	Italy	Turin Challenger	$ 25,000	Clay	(Spain) Álex Calatrava	(Italy) Leonardo Azzaro (Italy) Giorgio Galimberti
31.05.	Czech Republic	Prostějov Challenger	$ 125,000	Clay	(Czech Republic) Radek Štěpánek	(Slovakia) Dominik Hrbatý (Czech Republic) Jaroslav Levinský
31.05.	Germany	Schickedanz Open	$ 50,000	Clay	(Czech Republic) Jiří Vaněk	(Chile) Adrián García (Serbia and Montenegro) Janko Tipsarević
31.05.	Great Britain	Surbiton Challenger	$ 50,000	Grass	(Slovakia) Karol Beck	(Australia) Nathan Healey (United States) Jim Thomas
31.05.	United States	Tallahassee Challenger	$ 50,000	Hard	(United States) Cecil Mamiit	(United States) Matías Boeker (Israel) Noam Okun
31.05.	Italy	Sassuolo Challenger	$ 25,000	Clay	(Italy) Potito Starace	(Italy) Enzo Artoni (Argentina) Ignacio González King

=== June ===
Date	Country	Tournament	Prizemoney	Surface	Singles champion	Doubles champions
07.06.	United States	Forest Hills Challenger	$ 50,000	Grass	(United States) Justin Gimelstob	(United States) Brandon Coupe (United States) Justin Gimelstob
07.06.	Switzerland	Lugano Challenger	$ 50,000	Clay	(Spain) Álex Calatrava	(Spain) Emilio Benfele Álvarez (Italy) Giorgio Galimberti
07.06.	Germany	ATU Cup	$ 25,000	Clay	(Czech Republic) Tomáš Berdych	(Serbia and Montenegro) Janko Tipsarević (Croatia) Lovro Zovko
14.06.	Germany	Nord/LB Open	$ 125,000	Clay	(Czech Republic) Tomáš Berdych	(Germany) Tomas Behrend (Spain) Emilio Benfele Álvarez
21.06.	Andorra	Andorra Challenger	$ 25,000	Hard	(Czech Republic) Tomáš Berdych	(Luxembourg) Gilles Müller (Pakistan) Aisam-ul-Haq Qureshi
21.06.	Italy	Reggio Emilia Challenger	$ 25,000	Clay	(France) Olivier Mutis	(Germany) Tomas Behrend (Italy) Tomas Tenconi
28.06.	Spain	Córdoba Challenger	$ 100,000	Hard	(Luxembourg) Gilles Müller	(United States) Brandon Coupe (United States) Tripp Phillips
28.06.	Italy	Mantua Challenger	$ 25,000	Clay	(Italy) Alessio di Mauro	(Italy) Daniele Bracciali (Italy) Giorgio Galimberti
28.06.	France	Montauban Challenger	$ 25,000	Clay	(Spain) Álex Calatrava	(Germany) Marc-Kevin Goellner (Spain) Álex López Morón
28.06.	Germany	Internationale Badische Meisterschaften um den Techem Cup – Zell	$ 25,000	Clay	(Germany) Daniel Elsner	(Switzerland) Jean-Claude Scherrer (Germany) Alexander Waske

=== July ===
Date	Country	Tournament	Prizemoney	Surface	Singles champion	Doubles champions
05.07.	Netherlands	Scheveningen Challenger	$ 50,000	Clay	(Netherlands) Peter Wessels	(Netherlands) Paul Logtens (Netherlands) Raemon Sluiter
05.07.	Hungary	Budaörs Challenger	$ 25,000	Clay	(Argentina) Ignacio González King	(Argentina) Ignacio González King (Spain) Gabriel Trujillo Soler
05.07.	Great Britain	Nottingham Challenger	$ 25,000	Grass	(France) Jo-Wilfried Tsonga	(Australia) Nathan Healey (Finland) Tuomas Ketola
05.07.	Germany	Oberstaufen Cup	$ 25,000	Clay	(Germany) Dieter Kindlmann	(Russia) Vadim Davletshin (Russia) Alexander Kudryavtsev
05.07.	Italy	San Benedetto Challenger	$ 25,000	Clay	(Italy) Daniele Bracciali	(Italy) Daniele Bracciali (Italy) Giorgio Galimberti
12.07.	Canada	Granby Challenger	$ 50,000	Hard	(United States) Michael Russell	(United States) Brian Baker (Canada) Frank Dancevic
12.07.	Italy	Rimini Challenger	$ 50,000	Clay	(Italy) Tomas Tenconi	(Italy) Daniele Bracciali (Italy) Giorgio Galimberti
12.07.	Brazil	São Paulo Challenger 2	$ 50,000	Hard	(Brazil) André Sá	(Mexico) Alejandro Hernández (Brazil) André Sá
12.07.	Great Britain	Manchester Challenger	$ 25,000	Grass	(United Kingdom) Alex Bogdanovic	(France) Jean-François Bachelot (France) Nicolas Mahut
19.07.	Netherlands	Hilversum Challenger	$ 125,000	Clay	(Germany) Philipp Kohlschreiber	(Netherlands) Fred Hemmes (Netherlands) Melle van Gemerden
19.07.	United States	Aptos Challenger	$ 50,000	Hard	(United States) Kevin Kim	(United States) Huntley Montgomery (United States) Tripp Phillips
19.07.	Brazil	Campos Challenger	$ 50,000	Hard	(Japan) Takao Suzuki	(Brazil) Ricardo Mello (Peru) Iván Miranda
19.07.	Finland	Tampere Challenger	$ 50,000	Clay	(Serbia and Montenegro) Boris Pašanski	(Argentina) Andres Dellatorre (Argentina) Diego Moyano
19.07.	Spain	Valladolid Challenger	$ 37.500	Hard	(France) Nicolas Mahut	(France) Jean-François Bachelot (France) Nicolas Mahut
19.07.	Italy	Recanati Challenger	$ 25,000	Hard	(Italy) Uros Vico	(Italy) Massimo Dell'Acqua (Italy) Uros Vico
25.07.	San Marino	San Marino Challenger	$ 100,000	Clay	(Italy) Potito Starace	(Italy) Massimo Bertolini (Belgium) Tom Vanhoudt
25.07.	Spain	Segovia Challenger	$ 100,000	Hard	(France) Paul-Henri Mathieu	(Russia) Igor Kunitsyn (Belarus) Vladimir Voltchkov
25.07.	United States	Lexington Challenger	$ 50,000	Hard	(United States) Matías Boeker	(United States) Matías Boeker (United States) Amer Delić
25.07.	Brazil	Belo Horizonte Challenger	$ 25,000	Hard	(Serbia and Montenegro) Janko Tipsarević	(Thailand) Sanchai Ratiwatana (Thailand) Sonchat Ratiwatana
25.07.	Russia	Togliatti Cup	$ 25,000	Hard	(France) Jo-Wilfried Tsonga	(Russia) Teymuraz Gabashvili (Russia) Dmitry Vlasov

=== August ===
Date	Country	Tournament	Prizemoney	Surface	Singles champion	Doubles champions
02.08.	Poland	Poznań Challenger	$ 75,000	Clay	(Czech Republic) Tomáš Zíb	(Poland) Adam Chadaj (France) Stéphane Robert
02.08.	United States	Denver Challenger	$ 50,000	Hard	(United States) Brian Baker	(United States) Brian Baker (United States) Rajeev Ram
02.08.	Italy	Trani Challenger	$ 50,000	Clay	(Italy) Filippo Volandri	(Italy) Massimo Bertolini (Spain) Álex López Morón
02.08.	Brazil	Gramado Challenger	$ 25,000	Hard	(Brazil) Ricardo Mello	(Mexico) Santiago González (Brazil) Bruno Soares
02.08.	Russia	Saransk Challenger	$ 25,000	Clay	(Slovakia) Ladislav Švarc	(Kazakhstan) Alexey Kedryuk (Uzbekistan) Vadim Kutsenko
02.08.	Romania	Timișoara Challenger	$ 25,000	Clay	(France) Marc Gicquel	(Romania) Florin Mergea (Romania) Horia Tecău
09.08.	United States	Binghamton Professional Tennis Tournament	$ 50,000	Hard	(Israel) Noam Okun	(United States) Huntley Montgomery (United States) Tripp Phillips
09.08.	France	Cordenons Challenger	$ 25,000	Clay	(Spain) Daniel Gimeno Traver	(Italy) Leonardo Azzaro (Hungary) Kornél Bardóczky
09.08.	Austria	Graz Challenger	$ 25,000	Hard	(Czech Republic) Jan Minář	(Austria) Julian Knowle (Austria) Alexander Peya
09.08.	Ecuador	Manta Challenger	$ 25,000	Hard	(Ecuador) Giovanni Lapentti	(Brazil) Marcos Daniel (Mexico) Santiago González
09.08.	Russia	St. Petersburg Challenger	$ 25,000	Clay	(France) Jean-René Lisnard	(Russia) Mikhail Elgin (Russia) Andrei Mishin
16.08.	United States	Bronx Challenger	$ 50,000	Hard	(France) Julien Jeanpierre	(United States) Huntley Montgomery (United States) Tripp Phillips
16.08.	Switzerland	Geneva Challenger	$ 37.500	Clay	(Switzerland) Stan Wawrinka	(Czech Republic) Tomáš Cibulec (Czech Republic) David Škoch
16.08.	Germany	Deutsche Vermögensberatung Challenger Open	$ 25,000	Clay	(Germany) Tobias Summerer	(Germany) Philipp Petzschner (Germany) Christopher Kas
16.08.	Uzbekistan	Samarkand Challenger	$ 25,000	Clay	(Argentina) Mariano Puerta	(France) Jean-François Bachelot (Netherlands) Melle van Gemerden
23.08.	Italy	Manerbio Challenger	$ 50,000	Clay	(Spain) Nicolás Almagro	(Czech Republic) Petr Luxa (Czech Republic) Martin Štěpánek
23.08.	Uzbekistan	Bukhara Challenger	$ 25,000	Hard	(Slovakia) Michal Mertiňák	(Slovakia) Michal Mertiňák (Czech Republic) Pavel Šnobel
30.08.	Ukraine	Kyiv Challenger	$ 50,000	Clay	(Spain) Nicolás Almagro	(Spain) Albert Portas (Argentina) Sergio Roitman
30.08.	Germany	Black Forest Open	$ 25,000	Clay	(Spain) Santiago Ventura	(Romania) Gabriel Trifu (Germany) Alexander Waske

=== September ===
Date	Country	Tournament	Prizemoney	Surface	Singles champion	Doubles champions
06.09.	Turkey	Istanbul Challenger	$ 75,000	Hard	(Netherlands) Peter Wessels	(Switzerland) George Bastl (Germany) Björn Phau
06.09.	South Korea	Seoul Challenger	$ 75,000	Hard	(South Korea) Lee Hyung-taik	(Australia) Ashley Fisher (Sweden) Robert Lindstedt
06.09.	Ukraine	Donezk Challenger	$ 50,000	Hard	(Switzerland) Marco Chiudinelli	(Russia) Igor Kunitsyn (Italy) Uros Vico
06.09.	Germany	Rhein-Main Challenger	$ 25,000	Clay	(Italy) Leonardo Azzaro	(Czech Republic) Ota Fukárek (Czech Republic) Jan Vacek
06.09.	Romania	Brașov Challenger	$ 25,000	Clay	(Romania) Victor Ioniță	(Spain) Salvador Navarro (Spain) Rubén Ramírez Hidalgo
06.09.	Italy	Genova Challenger	$ 25,000	Clay	(Costa Rica) Juan Antonio Marín	(Spain) Emilio Benfele Álvarez (Spain) Álex López Morón
13.09.	Hungary	Budapest Challenger	$ 25,000	Clay	(France) Stéphane Robert	(Argentina) Juan Pablo Brzezicki (Argentina) Mariano Delfino
13.09.	Iran	Tehran Challenger	$ 25,000	Clay	(Argentina) Mariano Puerta	(Austria) Oliver Marach (Switzerland) Jean-Claude Scherrer
20.09.	Poland	Szczecin Challenger	$ 125,000	Clay	(Argentina) Edgardo Massa	(Argentina) Lucas Arnold Ker (Argentina) Mariano Hood
20.09.	United States	Covington Challenger	$ 50,000	Hard	(United States) Paul Goldstein	(United States) Paul Goldstein (United States) K. J. Hippensteel
20.09.	Bosnia and Herzegovina	Banja Luka Challenger	$ 25,000	Clay	(Russia) Yuri Schukin	Not completed
20.09.	China	Beijing Challenger	$ 25,000	Hard	(United States) Justin Gimelstob	(Australia) Ashley Fisher (United States) Tripp Phillips
27.09.	France	Grenoble Challenger	$ 75,000	Hard (i)	(Slovakia) Karol Kučera	(Italy) Uros Vico (Croatia) Lovro Zovko
27.09.	United States	College Station Challenger	$ 25,000	Hard	(Brazil) André Sá	(United States) Paul Goldstein (United States) Brian Vahaly
27.09.	Croatia	Dubrovnik Challenger	$ 25,000	Clay	(Argentina) Edgardo Massa	(Argentina) Juan Pablo Brzezicki (Argentina) Martín Vassallo Argüello

=== October ===
Date	Country	Tournament	Prizemoney	Surface	Singles champion	Doubles champions
04.10.	United States	Austin Challenger	$ 50,000	Hard	(United States) Robert Kendrick	(Brazil) André Sá (Brazil) Bruno Soares
04.10.	Spain	Seville Challenger	$ 37.500	Clay	(Spain) Óscar Hernández	(Germany) Tomas Behrend (Germany) Alexander Waske
04.10.	Ecuador	Quito Challenger	$ 25,000	Clay	(Ecuador) Giovanni Lapentti	(Mexico) Santiago González (Mexico) Alejandro Hernández
04.10.	Italy	Rome Challenger II	$ 25,000	Clay	(France) Nicolas Coutelot	(Hungary) Kornél Bardóczky (Hungary) Gergely Kisgyörgy
11.10.	United States	Tiburon Challenger	$ 50,000	Hard	(United States) K. J. Hippensteel	(Brazil) André Sá (Brazil) Bruno Soares
11.10.	Spain	Barcelona Challenger	$ 25,000	Clay	(Switzerland) Stan Wawrinka	(Spain) Emilio Benfele Álvarez (Spain) Gabriel Trujillo Soler
18.10.	United States	Bolton Challenger	$ 25,000	Hard (i)	(Cyprus) Marcos Baghdatis	(South Africa) Jeff Coetzee (United States) Jim Thomas
18.10.	Canada	Burbank Challenger	$ 25,000	Hard	(United States) Kevin Kim	(United States) Nick Rainey (United States) Brian Wilson

=== November ===
Date	Country	Tournament	Prizemoney	Surface	Singles champion	Doubles champions
01.11.	Germany	Lambertz Open by STAWAG	$ 50,000	Carpet (i)	(Serbia and Montenegro) Novak Djokovic	(Sweden) Simon Aspelin (Australia) Todd Perry
01.11.	United States	Homestead Challenger	$ 50,000	Hard	(Romania) Răzvan Sabău	(Romania) Gabriel Trifu (United States) Glenn Weiner
01.11.	Chile	Santiago Challenger	$ 50,000	Clay	(Spain) Óscar Hernández	(Italy) Enzo Artoni (Argentina) Ignacio González King
01.11.	Australia	Caloundra Challenger	$ 25,000	Hard	(Chinese Taipei) Lu Yen-hsun	(Australia) Luke Bourgeois (Chinese Taipei) Lu Yen-hsun
08.11.	Slovakia	Bratislava Challenger	$ 100,000	Carpet (i)	(Cyprus) Marcos Baghdatis	(Sweden) Simon Aspelin (United States) Graydon Oliver
08.11.	Argentina	Buenos Aires Challenger	$ 50,000	Clay	(Austria) Oliver Marach	(Italy) Enzo Artoni (Argentina) Ignacio González King
08.11.	United States	Nashville Challenger	$ 50,000	Hard (i)	(United States) Justin Gimelstob	(United States) Jason Marshall (United States) Travis Parrott
15.11.	Ukraine	Dnipro Challenger	$ 125,000	Hard (i)	(Romania) Andrei Pavel	(Slovakia) Karol Beck (Czech Republic) Jaroslav Levinský
15.11.	France	Champaign Challenger	$ 50,000	Hard (i)	(United States) Justin Gimelstob	(United States) Brian Baker (United States) Rajeev Ram
15.11.	Finland	Helsinki Challenger	$ 50,000	Hard (i)	(Netherlands) Peter Wessels	(Sweden) Robert Lindstedt (Chinese Taipei) Lu Yen-hsun
15.11.	Bolivia	Santa Cruz Challenger	$ 50,000	Clay	(Argentina) Mariano Puerta	(Italy) Enzo Artoni (Argentina) Ignacio González King
15.11.	Germany	Okal Cup	$ 25,000	Carpet (i)	(Germany) Alexander Waske	(Germany) Christopher Kas (Germany) Philipp Petzschner
15.11.	Mexico	Puebla Challenger	$ 25,000	Hard	(Mexico) Miguel Gallardo Valles	(Mexico) Santiago González (Mexico) Alejandro González
22.11.	Luxembourg	Luxemburg Challenger	$ 150,000	Hard (i)	(Sweden) Joachim Johansson	(Italy) Massimo Bertolini (Czech Republic) Petr Luxa
22.11.	Netherlands	Groningen Challenger	$ 75,000	Hard (i)	(Netherlands) Peter Wessels	(Germany) Alexander Waske (Netherlands) Rogier Wassen
22.11.	Colombia	Bogotá Challenger	$ 50,000	Clay	(Paraguay) Ramón Delgado	(Argentina) Sergio Roitman (Spain) Santiago Ventura
22.11.	Czech Republic	Prague Challenger II	$ 25,000	Carpet (i)	(Finland) Tuomas Ketola	(Czech Republic) Lukáš Dlouhý (Slovakia) Igor Zelenay
22.11.	Réunion	La Réunion Challenger	$ 25,000	Hard	(Czech Republic) Michal Tabara	(Thailand) Sanchai Ratiwatana (Thailand) Sonchat Ratiwatana
29.11.	Mauritius	Mauritius Challenger	$ 125,000	Hard	(Romania) Andrei Pavel	(Romania) Andrei Pavel (Romania) Gabriel Trifu
29.11.	Brazil	Aracaju Challenger	$ 50,000	Clay	(Ecuador) Nicolás Lapentti	(Italy) Enzo Artoni (Argentina) Ignacio González King
29.11.	Italy	Milan Challenger	$ 50,000	Hard (i)	(Switzerland) George Bastl	(Italy) Daniele Bracciali (Austria) Julian Knowle
29.11.	Iran	Kish Challenger	$ 25,000	Clay	(Germany) Tomas Behrend	(Germany) Tomas Behrend (Netherlands) Rogier Wassen

=== December ===
Date	Country	Tournament	Prizemoney	Surface	Singles champion	Doubles champions
06.12.	Mexico	Guadalajara Challenger	$ 50,000	Clay	(Argentina) Mariano Puerta	(Mexico) Santiago González (Mexico) Alejandro González
06.12.	Austria	Ischgl Challenger	$ 50,000	Carpet (i)	(Belgium) Dick Norman	(Italy) Leonardo Azzaro (Germany) Christopher Kas
