= 2010 Riviera di Rimini Challenger – Singles =

Singles
- 2010 Riviera di Rimini Challenger

Final
- Champion: (Italy) Paolo Lorenzi
- Runner-up: (Argentina) Federico del Bonis
- Score: 6–2, 6–0

Events
Singles	Doubles
← 2009 ·	Riviera di Rimini Challenger	· 2011 →

Thomaz Bellucci was the title defender, but he chose not to compete this year.
Paolo Lorenzi became the new champion, after he defeated against Federico del Bonis in the final 6–2, 6–0.

== Seeds ==
1. (Turkey) Marsel İlhan (first round)
2. (Italy) Filippo Volandri (second round, retired)
3. (Italy) Paolo Lorenzi (champion)
4. (Slovenia) Grega Žemlja (first round)
5. (Argentina) Federico del Bonis (final)
6. (Belgium) Steve Darcis (withdrew)
7. (Spain) Albert Ramos-Viñolas (second round)
8. (Romania) Adrian Ungur (quarterfinals)
9. (Germany) Dieter Kindlmann (second round)

== Draw ==
=== Key ===
- Q = Qualifier
- WC = Wild card
- LL = Lucky loser
- Alt = Alternate
- SE = Special exempt
- PR = Protected ranking
- ITF = ITF entry
- JE = Junior exempt
- w/o = Walkover
- r = Retired
- d = Defaulted
- SR = Special ranking

=== Finals ===
Semifinals
(Argentina) Juan Pablo Brzezicki	1	0^{r}
3	(Italy) Paolo Lorenzi	6	3
5	(Argentina) Federico del Bonis	7	6
ALT	(Italy) Alessio di Mauro	6^{4}	2

Final
3	(Italy) Paolo Lorenzi	6	6
5	(Argentina) Federico del Bonis	2	0

=== Top half ===
First round
1	(Turkey) M İlhan	2	3
(Germany) D Gremelmayr	6	6
Q	(Spain) P Clar-Rosselló	6	7
Q	(Italy) S Galvani	4	6^{10}
(Slovakia) M Kližan	6^{5}	2
(Argentina) JP Brzezicki	7	6
(Austria) A Peya	6	2	1
7	(Spain) A Ramos-Viñolas	2	6	6
3	(Italy) P Lorenzi	7	7
Q	(Italy) G Naso	5	6^{4}
(Slovenia) B Kavčič	3	6^{5}
(Argentina) D Junqueira	6	7
(Croatia) I Dodig	3	6	6
LL	(France) N Renavand	6	4	4
(Argentina) M Vassallo Argüello	3	3
9	(Germany) D Kindlmann	6	6

Second round
(Germany) D Gremelmayr	6	6
Q	(Spain) P Clar-Rosselló	3	2
(Argentina) JP Brzezicki	7	6
7	(Spain) A Ramos-Viñolas	6^{8}	2
3	(Italy) P Lorenzi	1	7	6
(Argentina) D Junqueira	6	6^{1}	1
(Croatia) I Dodig	7	6
9	(Germany) D Kindlmann	6^{6}	3

Quarterfinals
(Germany) D Gremelmayr	6	6^{4}	1^{r}
(Argentina) JP Brzezicki	1	7	3
3	(Italy) P Lorenzi	6	6
(Croatia) I Dodig	2	2

Semifinals
(Argentina) JP Brzezicki	1	0^{r}
3	(Italy) P Lorenzi	6	3

=== Bottom half ===
First round
5	(Argentina) F del Bonis	6	6
(France) V Millot	2	3
LL	(Austria) H Wiltschnig	3	6	7
WC	(Italy) F Gaio	6	2	5
SE	(Germany) C-M Stebe	6^{1}	6	3
WC	(Italy) D Giorgini	7	2	6
Q	(Italy) W Trusendi	7	6
4	(Slovenia) G Žemlja	6^{4}	2
8	(Romania) A Ungur	1	6	6
(Serbia) F Krajinović	6	3	2
(Russia) K Kravchuk	6	1	1
WC	(Italy) F Cipolla	3	6	6
ALT	(Italy) A di Mauro	6	6
(Czech Republic) D Lojda	2	2
WC	(Italy) A Giannessi	1	0^{r}
2	(Italy) F Volandri	6	4

Second round
5	(Argentina) F del Bonis	6	6
LL	(Austria) H Wiltschnig	1	2
WC	(Italy) D Giorgini	6	6
Q	(Italy) W Trusendi	1	3
8	(Romania) A Ungur	6	6
WC	(Italy) F Cipolla	3	4
ALT	(Italy) A di Mauro	6^{4}	7	0
2	(Italy) F Volandri	7	6^{3}	0^{r}

Quarterfinals
5	(Argentina) F del Bonis	6	6
WC	(Italy) D Giorgini	3	4
8	(Romania) A Ungur	6^{6}	0
ALT	(Italy) A di Mauro	7	6

Semifinals
5	(Argentina) F del Bonis	7	6
ALT	(Italy) A di Mauro	6^{4}	2
