= 2004 Czech Indoor Open – Doubles =

Doubles
- 2004 Czech Indoor Open

Final
- Champion: (Czech Republic) Lukáš Dlouhý (Slovakia) Igor Zelenay
- Runner-up: (Czech Republic) Jan Minář (Czech Republic) Jaroslav Pospíšil
- Score: 6–3, 3–6, 7–6^{(7–5)}

Events
Singles	Doubles
- Czech Indoor Open

The 2004 Czech Indoor Open Open was a men's tennis tournament played on indoor hard courts in Průhonice, Czech Republic, and was part of the 2004 ATP Challenger Series.

This was the second edition of the event and was held from 23 to 28 November 2004.

Martin Štěpánek and Igor Zelenay were the previous edition winners. The first lost in semifinals.

Lukáš Dlouhý and Igor Zelenay won the title, defeating Jan Minář and Jaroslav Pospíšil 6–3, 3–6, 7–6^{(7–5)} in the final.

Igor Zelenay successfully defended the title.

== Seeds ==
1. (Czech Republic) Martin Štěpánek / (Czech Republic) Jan Vacek (semifinals)
2. (Italy) Gianluca Bazzica / (Italy) Massimo Dell'Acqua (first round)
3. (Czech Republic) Ota Fukárek / (Hungary) Gergely Kisgyorgy (quarterfinals)
4. (Czech Republic) Lukáš Dlouhý / (Slovakia) Igor Zelenay (champion)

== Draw ==
Key

- Q = Qualifier
- WC = Wild card
- LL = Lucky loser
- Alt = Alternate
- ITF = ITF entry
- PR = Protected ranking
- SR = Special ranking
- SE = Special exempt
- JE = Junior exempt
- JR = Junior Accelerator Programme entrant
- CO = College Accelerator Programme entrant
- NG = Next Gen Accelerator Program entrant
- w/o = Walkover
- r = Retired
- d = Defaulted

First round
1	(Czech Republic) Martin Štěpánek (Czech Republic) Jan Vacek	6	6
(Netherlands) B Beszelsen (Slovakia) Roman Kukal	4	4
(Czech Republic) Jan Říha (Czech Republic) Pavel Riha	6	6
(Czech Republic) Vaclav Duda (Czech Republic) Petr Stepanek	2	1
3	(Czech Republic) Ota Fukárek (Hungary) G Kisgyorgy	7	7
(Ukraine) Orest Tereščuk (Croatia) Lovro Zovko	5	5
(Czech Republic) Jan Minář (Czech Republic) J Pospíšil	7	6
(Czech Republic) L Chramosta (Czech Republic) David Miketa	6^{0}	4
(Czech Republic) David Novak (Czech Republic) Martin Vacek	3	7	6
(France) Vincent Baudat (France) Nicolas Tourte	6	5	3
4	(Czech Republic) Lukáš Dlouhý (Slovakia) Igor Zelenay	6^{5}	6	6
(Russia) K Ivanov-Smolensky (Kazakhstan) Yuri Schukin	7	2	4
(Croatia) Ivan Cerović (Czech Republic) Daniel Lustig	6	6
(Italy) Alberto Brizzi (Italy) Daniele Giorgini	2	2
(Czech Republic) Roman Michalik (Czech Republic) Pavel Šnobel	6	7
2	(Italy) Gianluca Bazzica (Italy) M Dell'Acqua	3	5

Quarterfinals
1	(Czech Republic) Martin Štěpánek (Czech Republic) Jan Vacek	6	6
(Czech Republic) Jan Říha (Czech Republic) Pavel Riha	2	1
3	(Czech Republic) Ota Fukárek (Hungary) G Kisgyorgy	2	4
(Czech Republic) Jan Minář (Czech Republic) J Pospíšil	6	6
(Czech Republic) David Novak (Czech Republic) Martin Vacek	3	6^{5}
4	(Czech Republic) Lukáš Dlouhý (Slovakia) Igor Zelenay	6	7
(Croatia) Ivan Cerović (Czech Republic) Daniel Lustig	2	2
(Czech Republic) Roman Michalik (Czech Republic) Pavel Šnobel	6	6

Semifinals
1	(Czech Republic) Martin Štěpánek (Czech Republic) Jan Vacek	6^{0}	3
(Czech Republic) Jan Minář (Czech Republic) J Pospíšil	7	6
4	(Czech Republic) Lukáš Dlouhý (Slovakia) Igor Zelenay	W-O
(Czech Republic) Roman Michalik (Czech Republic) Pavel Šnobel

Finals
(Czech Republic) Jan Minář (Czech Republic) J Pospíšil	3	6	6^{5}
4	(Czech Republic) Lukáš Dlouhý (Slovakia) Igor Zelenay	6	3	7
