= Evgueni Smirnov =

Russian tennis player

- Country (sports): Russia
- Born: 16 December 1982 (age 43)
- Prize money: $41,027

Singles
- Highest ranking: No. 388 (18 Oct 2004)

Doubles
- Career record: 1–1
- Highest ranking: No. 233 (21 Nov 2005)

Evgueni Smirnov (born 16 December 1982) is a Russian former professional tennis player.

Smirnov had best world rankings of 388 in singles and 233 in doubles. His only ATP Tour main draw appearance came in the doubles event at the 2005 Kremlin Cup, where he made it through to the quarter-finals (with Philipp Mukhometov). He won one singles and nine doubles titles on the ITF Futures circuit during his career.

== ITF Futures titles ==
=== Singles: (1) ===
No.	Date	Tournament	Surface	Opponent	Score
1.	Aug 2004	Russia F1, Sergiev Posad	Clay	(Russia) Denis Matsukevitch	6–2, 6–7^{(6)}, 7–6^{(5)}

=== Doubles: (9) ===
No.	Date	Tournament	Surface	Partner	Opponents	Score
1.	Jun 2001	Macedonia F2, Skopje	Clay	(Russia) Mikhail Elgin	(Bulgaria) Todor Enev (Bulgaria) Milen Velev	4–6, 6–4, 6–1
2.	Feb 2002	Israel F2, Ashkelon	Hard	(Finland) Tero Vilen	(Germany) Christian Grunes (United States) Jason Marshall	6–4, 6–1
3.	May 2004	Romania F4, Bucharest	Clay	(Russia) Philipp Mukhometov	(Romania) Artemon Apostu-Efremov (Romania) Teodor Bolanu	4–6, 6–3, 7–5
4.	Jun 2004	Ukraine F1, Dnipro	Clay	(Russia) Dmitry Vlasov	(Ukraine) Dmitri Gurichev (Georgia (country)) Irakli Ushangishvili	6–4, 6–1
5.	Aug 2004	Russia F1, Sergiyev Posad	Clay	(Russia) Philipp Mukhometov	(Russia) Denis Matsukevich (Germany) Eric Scherer	6–2, 6–2
6.	Aug 2004	Russia F2, Krasnoarmeysk	Hard	(Russia) Philipp Mukhometov	(Russia) Denis Matsukevich (Germany) Eric Scherer	6–0, 6–2
7.	Feb 2005	Austria F2, Bergheim	Carpet	(Ukraine) Nikolai Dyachok	(Russia) Andrei Stoliarov (Ukraine) Aleksandr Yarmola	6–1, 3–6, 6–1
8.	May 2005	Uzbekistan F4, Andijan	Hard	(Russia) Andrei Stoliarov	(Ukraine) Orest Tereshchuk (Ukraine) Sergei Yaroshenko	0–6, 6–4, 6–1
9.	Jun 2005	Turkey F1, Ankara	Clay	(Ukraine) Sergei Yaroshenko	(France) Cyril Baudin (France) Charly Villeneuve	6–2, 7–6^{(5)}
