= 2009 Riviera di Rimini Challenger =

- Date: July 13–19
- Edition: 6th
- Location: Rimini, Italy

Champions

Singles
- (Brazil) Thomaz Bellucci

Doubles
- (Germany) Matthias Bachinger / (Germany) Dieter Kindlmann
← 2008 ·	Riviera di Rimini Challenger	· 2010 →

The 2009 Riviera di Rimini Challenger was a professional tennis tournament played on outdoor red clay courts. It was the sixth edition of the tournament which was part of the 2009 ATP Challenger Tour. It took place in Rimini, Italy between 13 and 19 July 2009.

== Singles main-draw entrants ==
=== Seeds ===
Nationality	Player	Ranking*	Seeding
BRA	Thiago Alves	98	1
ESP	Rubén Ramírez Hidalgo	109	2
CRO	~~Roko Karanušić~~	~~112~~	~~3~~
SRB	Ilija Bozoljac	126	4
ITA	Filippo Volandri	138	5
BRA	Thomaz Bellucci	143	6
NED	Jesse Huta Galung	148	7
ITA	Paolo Lorenzi	150	8

- Rankings are as of July 6, 2009.

=== Other entrants ===
The following players received wildcards into the singles main draw:

- (Italy) Daniele Bracciali
- (Argentina) Juan Ignacio Chela
- (Spain) Rubén Ramírez Hidalgo
- (Italy) Filippo Volandri

The following players received special exempt into the singles main draw:

- (Czech Republic) Jan Minář
- (Spain) Albert Ramos Viñolas

The following players received entry from the qualifying draw:

- (Italy) Enrico Burzi
- (Uzbekistan) Farrukh Dustov
- (Italy) Daniele Giorgini
- (Italy) Gianluca Naso
- (Germany) Marc Sieber (as a Lucky Loser)

== Champions ==
=== Singles ===
(Brazil) Thomaz Bellucci def. (Argentina) Juan Pablo Brzezicki, 3–6, 6–3, 6–1

=== Doubles ===
(Germany) Matthias Bachinger / (Germany) Dieter Kindlmann def. (Italy) Leonardo Azzaro / (Italy) Marco Crugnola, 6–4, 6–2
