= 2009 Riviera di Rimini Challenger – Singles =

Singles
- 2009 Riviera di Rimini Challenger

Final
- Champion: (Brazil) Thomaz Bellucci
- Runner-up: (Argentina) Juan Pablo Brzezicki
- Score: 3–6, 6–3, 6–1

Events
Singles	Doubles
← 2008 ·	Riviera di Rimini Challenger	· 2010 →

Diego Junqueira was the winner in 2008, but he chose to not defend his title.
Thomaz Bellucci won in the final 3–6, 6–3, 6–1, against Juan Pablo Brzezicki.

== Seeds ==
1. (Brazil) Thiago Alves (first round)
2. (Spain) Rubén Ramírez Hidalgo (first round)
3. (Croatia) ~~Roko Karanušić~~ (withdrew)
4. (Serbia) Ilija Bozoljac (second round)
5. (Italy) Filippo Volandri (quarterfinals)
6. (Brazil) Thomaz Bellucci (champion)
7. (Netherlands) Jesse Huta Galung (first round)
8. (Italy) Paolo Lorenzi (second round)

== Draw ==
=== Key ===
- Q = Qualifier
- WC = Wild card
- LL = Lucky loser
- Alt = Alternate
- SE = Special exempt
- PR = Protected ranking
- ITF = ITF entry
- JE = Junior exempt
- w/o = Walkover
- r = Retired
- d = Defaulted
- SR = Special ranking

=== Final four ===
Semifinals
(Germany) Dieter Kindlmann	7	2	2
6	(Brazil) Thomaz Bellucci	6^{1}	6	6
(Argentina) Juan Pablo Brzezicki	0	6	6
WC	(Argentina) Juan Ignacio Chela	6	3	1

Final
6	(Brazil) Thomaz Bellucci	3	6	6
(Argentina) Juan Pablo Brzezicki	6	3	1

=== Top half ===
First round
1	(Brazil) T Alves	6^{4}	1
(Brazil) F Ferreiro	7	6
(Germany) D Kindlmann	6	4	6
(Belgium) N Desein	4	6	1
(Germany) J Reister	3	6	6
SE	(Czech Republic) J Minář	6	4	2
Q	(Italy) D Giorgini	1	0
8	(Italy) P Lorenzi	6	6
4	(Serbia) I Bozoljac	6	1	6
(Italy) M Crugnola	4	6	2
(Czech Republic) J Vaněk	6^{3}	6	6
(Slovenia) G Žemlja	7	4	2
(Italy) A di Mauro	6	3	2
Q	(Italy) E Burzi	3	6	6
(Spain) P Santos	1	6^{2}
6	(Brazil) T Bellucci	6	7

Second round
(Brazil) F Ferreiro	6	4	2
(Germany) D Kindlmann	2	6	6
(Germany) J Reister	6	6
8	(Italy) P Lorenzi	0	3
4	(Serbia) I Bozoljac	4	4
(Czech Republic) J Vaněk	6	6
Q	(Italy) E Burzi	2	2
6	(Brazil) T Bellucci	6	6

Quarterfinals
(Germany) D Kindlmann	7	6
(Germany) J Reister	5	1
(Czech Republic) J Vaněk	6	4	1
6	(Brazil) T Bellucci	4	6	6

Semifinals
(Germany) D Kindlmann	7	2	2
6	(Brazil) T Bellucci	6^{1}	6	6

=== Bottom half ===
First round
5/WC	(Italy) F Volandri	7	7
WC	(Italy) D Bracciali	6^{1}	5
(Italy) S Galvani	0	6	7
(Germany) M Bachinger	6	4	5
(Argentina) JP Brzezicki	7	3
(Italy) T Tenconi	5	0	r
(Spain) A Ramos-Viñolas	3	6	5
Q	(Italy) G Naso	6	3	7
7	(Netherlands) J Huta Galung	6^{5}	2
(France) T Ascione	7	6
WC	(Argentina) J I Chela	6	6
LL	(Germany) M Sieber	2	1
(France) O Patience	2	0
Q	(Uzbekistan) F Dustov	6	6
(France) S Robert	6	6
2	(Spain) R Ramírez Hidalgo	4	0

Second round
5/WC	(Italy) F Volandri	3	6	6
(Italy) S Galvani	6	2	1
(Argentina) J P Brzezicki	6	6
Q	(Italy) G Naso	2	4
(France) T Ascione	6	5	4
WC	(Argentina) J I Chela	4	7	6
Q	(Uzbekistan) F Dustov	3	0	r
(France) S Robert	6	3

Quarterfinals
5/WC	(Italy) F Volandri	5	0	r
(Argentina) J P Brzezicki	7	4
WC	(Argentina) J I Chela	7	6
(France) S Robert	6^{3}	3

Semifinals
(Argentina) JP Brzezicki	0	6	6
WC	(Argentina) JI Chela	6	3	1
