= 2010 Riviera di Rimini Challenger =

- Date: July 12 – July 18
- Edition: 7th
- Location: Rimini, Italy

Champions

Singles
- (Italy) Paolo Lorenzi

Doubles
- (Italy) Giulio Di Meo / (Romania) Adrian Ungur
← 2009 ·	Riviera di Rimini Challenger	· 2011 →

The 2010 Riviera di Rimini Challenger was a professional tennis tournament played on outdoor red clay courts. It was the seventh edition of the tournament which was part of the 2010 ATP Challenger Tour. It took place in Rimini, Italy between 12 July and 18 July 2010.

== ATP entrants ==
=== Seeds ===
Nationality	Player	Ranking*	Seeding
TUR	Marsel İlhan	103	1
ITA	Filippo Volandri	106	2
ITA	Paolo Lorenzi	120	3
SVN	Grega Žemlja	123	4
ARG	Federico del Bonis	134	5
BEL	~~Steve Darcis~~	139	6
ESP	Albert Ramos-Viñolas	142	7
ROU	Adrian Ungur	148	8

- Rankings are as of July 5, 2010.

=== Other entrants ===
The following players received wildcards into the singles main draw:

- (Italy) Flavio Cipolla
- (Italy) Federico Gaio
- (Italy) Alessandro Giannessi
- (Italy) Daniele Giorgini

The following players received entry from the qualifying draw:

- (Spain) Pedro Clar-Rosselló
- (Italy) Stefano Galvani
- (Italy) Gianluca Naso
- (France) Nicolas Renavand (as a Lucky Loser)
- (Italy) Walter Trusendi
- (Austria) Herbert Wiltschnig (as a Lucky Loser)

== Champions ==
=== Singles ===
(Italy) Paolo Lorenzi def. (Argentina) Federico del Bonis, 6–2, 6–0

=== Doubles ===
(Italy) Giulio Di Meo / (Romania) Adrian Ungur def. (Argentina) Juan Pablo Brzezicki / (Austria) Alexander Peya, 7–6(6), 3–6, [10–7]
