= 2010 Riviera di Rimini Challenger – Doubles =

Doubles
- 2010 Riviera di Rimini Challenger

Final
- Champions: (Italy) Giulio Di Meo (Romania) Adrian Ungur
- Runners-up: (Argentina) Juan Pablo Brzezicki (Austria) Alexander Peya
- Score: 7–6(6), 3–6, [10–7]

Events
Singles	Doubles
- Riviera di Rimini Challenger

Matthias Bachinger and Dieter Kindlmann were the defending champions, but decided not to participate.

Giulio Di Meo and Adrian Ungur won the final against Juan Pablo Brzezicki and Alexander Peya 7–6(6), 3–6, [10–7].

== Seeds ==
1. (Austria) Martin Slanar / (Croatia) Lovro Zovko (quarterfinals)
2. (United States) Brian Battistone / (India) Purav Raja (semifinals)
3. (Germany) Martin Emmrich / (Germany) Frank Moser (semifinals)
4. (Argentina) Juan Pablo Brzezicki / (Austria) Alexander Peya (finals)

== Draw ==
Key

- Q = Qualifier
- WC = Wild card
- LL = Lucky loser
- Alt = Alternate
- ITF = ITF entry
- PR = Protected ranking
- SR = Special ranking
- SE = Special exempt
- JE = Junior exempt
- JR = Junior Accelerator Programme entrant
- CO = College Accelerator Programme entrant
- NG = Next Gen Accelerator Program entrant
- w/o = Walkover
- r = Retired
- d = Defaulted

=== Draw ===
First round
1	(Austria) M Slanar (Croatia) L Zovko	6	6
WC	(Italy) N Cotto (Italy) S Napolitano	2	1
(Argentina) F del Bonis (Spain) A Ramos-Viñolas	5	6	[7]
WC	(Italy) G Di Meo (Romania) A Ungur	7	3	[10]
3	(Germany) M Emmrich (Germany) F Moser	4	6	[10]
ALT	(Italy) F Gaio (Italy) A Giannessi	6	1	[5]
WC	(Italy) E Fioravante (Italy) W Trusendi	6	6^{5}	[2]
(Italy) D Giorgini (Italy) A Motti	3	7	[10]
(Spain) P Clar-Rosselló (France) V Millot	2	3
(Germany) D Gremelmayr (Slovakia) M Kližan	6	6
(Italy) S Galvani (Russia) D Sitak	1	r
4	(Argentina) JP Brzezicki (Austria) A Peya	3
(Italy) F Cipolla (Brazil) F Ferreiro	5	4
(France) O Charroin (France) A Renard	7	6
(Spain) R Bautista-Agut (Czech Republic) D Lojda	3	1
2	(United States) B Battistone (India) P Raja	6	6

Quarterfinals
1	(Austria) M Slanar (Croatia) L Zovko	4	6	[10]
WC	(Italy) G Di Meo (Romania) A Ungur	6	2	[12]
3	(Germany) M Emmrich (Germany) F Moser	6	6
(Italy) D Giorgini (Italy) A Motti	3	2
(Germany) D Gremelmayr (Slovakia) M Kližan	6^{6}	6^{8}
4	(Argentina) JP Brzezicki (Austria) A Peya	7	7
(France) O Charroin (France) A Renard	6	2	[10]
2	(United States) B Battistone (India) P Raja	2	6	[12]

Semifinals
WC	(Italy) G Di Meo (Romania) A Ungur	7	6^{4}	[10]
3	(Germany) M Emmrich (Germany) F Moser	6^{4}	7	[3]
4	(Argentina) JP Brzezicki (Austria) A Peya	6	6
2	(United States) B Battistone (India) P Raja	0	4

Final
WC	(Italy) G Di Meo (Romania) A Ungur	7	3	[10]
4	(Argentina) JP Brzezicki (Austria) A Peya	6^{6}	6	[7]
