= Philipp Mukhometov =

Russian tennis player

- Full name: Philipp Dmitrievich Mukhometov
- Country (sports): Russia
- Born: 25 November 1983 (age 41)
- Plays: Right-handed
- Prize money: $47,110

Singles
- Highest ranking: No. 355 (24 Feb 2003)

Doubles
- Career record: 1–1
- Highest ranking: No. 312 (25 Aug 2003)
Medal record
Universiade
Silver medal – second place	2001 Beijing	Singles

Philipp Dmitrievich Mukhometov (born 25 November 1983) is a Russian former professional tennis player.

Mukhometov, who comes from Moscow, was a member of Russia's 2001 Sunshine Cup winning team and won a silver medal in singles at the 2001 Summer Universiade in Beijing. On the professional tour, Mukhometov had a best singles ranking of 355 in the world and won two ITF Futures titles. He made his only ATP Tour main draw appearance as a doubles player, at the Kremlin Cup in 2005, reaching the quarter-finals.

== Challenger/Futures titles ==
=== Singles ===
Legend
ITF Futures (2)

No.	Date	Tournament	Tier	Surface	Opponent	Score
1.	Feb 2002	Israel F2, Ashkelon	Futures	Hard	(Israel) Nir Welgreen	6–1, 2–6, 6–0
2.	Aug 2004	Russia F2, Krasnoarmeysk	Futures	Hard	(Russia) Konstantin Kravchuk	2–6, 6–3, 6–2

=== Doubles ===
Legend
ATP Challenger (1)
ITF Futures (4)

No.	Date	Tournament	Tier	Surface	Partner	Opponents	Score
1.	Jul 2002	Togliatti Challenger, Togliatti	Challenger	Hard	(Russia) Dmitry Vlasov	(Russia) Artem Derepasko (Russia) Mikhail Elgin	6–4, 6–4
1.	May 2003	Italy F8, Verona	Futures	Clay	(Italy) Gianluca Bazzica	(Italy) Alessandro da Col (Italy) Christian Persico	6–4, 7–6^{(5)}
2.	Aug 2004	Russia F1, Sergiyev Posad	Futures	Clay	(Russia) Evgueni Smirnov	(Russia) Denis Matsukevich (Germany) Eric Scherer	6–2, 6–2
3.	Aug 2004	Russia F2, Krasnoarmeysk	Futures	Hard	(Russia) Evgueni Smirnov	(Russia) Denis Matsukevich (Germany) Eric Scherer	6–0, 6–2
4.	May 2004	Romania F4, Bucharest	Futures	Clay	(Russia) Evgueni Smirnov	(Romania) Artemon Apostu-Efremov (Romania) Teodor Bolanu	4–6, 6–3, 7–5
