= Sergei Yaroshenko =

Ukrainian tennis player

- Country (sports): Ukraine
- Born: 6 April 1977 (age 47); Nova Kakhovka, Ukraine
- Height: 178 cm (5 ft 10 in)
- Plays: Left-handed
- Prize money: $24,230

Singles
- Career record: 4–4 (Davis Cup)
- Highest ranking: No. 356 (2 Aug 2004)

Doubles
- Career record: 1–0 (Davis Cup)
- Highest ranking: No. 524 (6 Jun 2005)

Sergei Yaroshenko (born 6 April 1977) is a Ukrainian former professional tennis player.

Yaroshenko, a left-handed player from Nova Kakhovka, reached a best singles world ranking of 356 and was a member of the Ukraine Davis Cup team between 1996 and 2005. He registered four Davis Cup singles wins, including a five set win over the Ivory Coast's Valentin Sanon in the fifth and deciding rubber of a 2003 tie. His performances on tour included an ITF Futures title in 2001 and a quarter-final appearance at the Prague Challenger in 2004.

== ITF Futures finals ==
=== Singles: 3 (1–2) ===
Result	W–L	Date	Tournament	Surface	Opponent	Score
Win	1–0	Sep 2001	Ukraine F1, Gorlivka	Clay	(Netherlands) Melvyn op der Heijde	6–3, 4–6, 7–5
Loss	1–1	Aug 2003	Russia F1, Sergiev Posad	Clay	(France) Laurent Recouderc	1–6, 6–3, 4–6
Loss	1–2	Jun 2005	Turkey F2, Istanbul	Hard	(Israel) Amir Hadad	6–3, 2–6, 0–6

=== Doubles: 3 (1–2) ===
Result	W–L	Date	Tournament	Surface	Partner	Opponents	Score
Loss	0–1	Aug 2002	Russia F1, Balashikha	Clay	(Ukraine) Aleksandr Yarmola	(Russia) Mikhail Elgin (Russia) Dmitry Vlasov	2–6, 7–6^{(2)}, 1–6
Loss	0–2	May 2005	Uzbekistan F4, Andijan	Hard	(Ukraine) Orest Tereshchuk	(Russia) Evgueni Smirnov (Russia) Andrei Stoliarov	6–0, 4–6, 1–6
Win	1–2	Jun 2005	Turkey F1, Ankara	Clay	(Russia) Evgueni Smirnov	(France) Cyril Baudin (France) Charly Villeneuve	6–2, 7–6^{(5)}
