= Dubrovnik Challenger =

Tennis competition

The Dubrovnik Challenger was a professional tennis tournament played on outdoor clay courts in Dubrovnik. It was part of the ATP Challenger Tour.

== Past finals ==
=== Singles ===
Year	Tier	Champion	Runner-up	Score
2004	$25K+H	(Argentina) Edgardo Massa	(Germany) Tomas Behrend	6–3, 7–6 (3)

=== Doubles ===
Year	Champions	Runners-up	Score
2004	(Argentina) Juan-Pablo Brzezicki (Argentina) Martín Vassallo Argüello	(Italy) Leonardo Azzaro (Russia) Yuriy Schukin	6–1, 6–2
