= Mikhail Elgin =

Russian tennis player

Mikhail Elgin Михаил Елгин
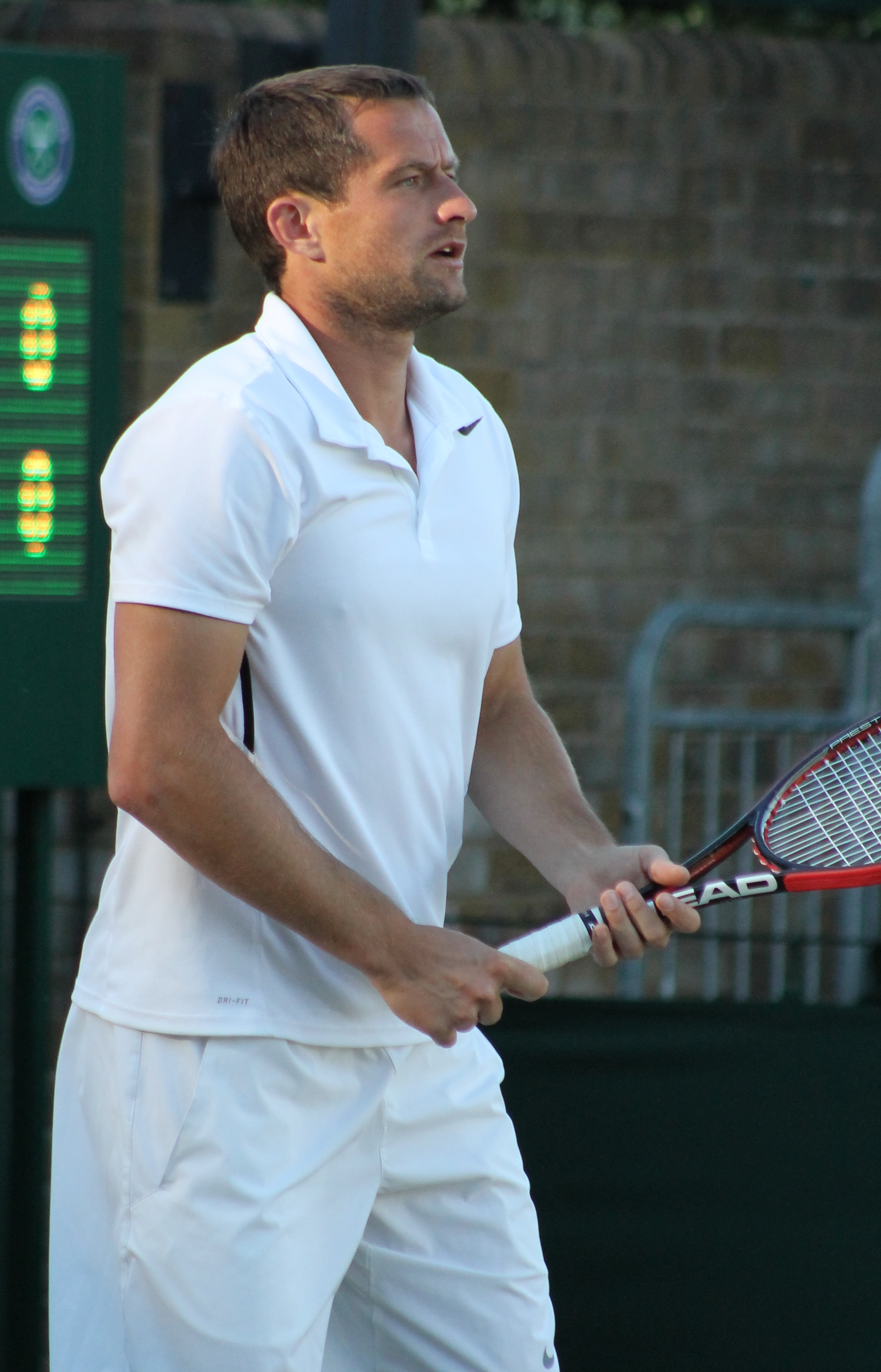
- Mikhail Elgin playing at Wimbledon 2014
- Country (sports): Russia
- Residence: Saint Petersburg, Russia
- Born: 14 October 1981 (age 44) Leningrad, Soviet Union
- Height: 1.83 m (6 ft 0 in)
- Turned pro: 1998
- Retired: 2023 (last match played)
- Plays: Right-handed (One-handed backhand)
- Prize money: US$872,152

Singles
- Career record: 2–9
- Career titles: 0
- Highest ranking: No. 123 (6 July 2009)

Grand Slam singles results
- Australian Open: Q2 (2009)
- French Open: Q2 (2009)
- Wimbledon: Q1 (2008, 2009)

Doubles
- Career record: 62–93
- Career titles: 1
- Highest ranking: No. 53 (25 June 2012)

Grand Slam doubles results
- Australian Open: 2R (2012, 2016)
- French Open: 3R (2012)
- Wimbledon: 3R (2012)
- US Open: 2R (2013, 2017)

Grand Slam mixed doubles results
- Wimbledon: QF (2014)

Mikhail Nikolayevich Elgin (Russian: Михаил Николаевич Елгин, romanized: Mikhail Nikolayevich Yelgin, IPA: [mʲɪxɐˈil jɪlˈɡʲin]; born 14 October 1981) is a Russian former professional tennis player.

Elgin became famous when he advanced to the quarter–finals in singles at the 2008 St. Petersburg Open, where he lost to Victor Hănescu from Romania 1–6, 4–6.

== ATP career finals ==
=== Doubles: 4 (1 title, 3 runners-up) ===
Legend Grand Slam tournaments (0–0) ATP World Tour Finals (0–0) ATP World Tour Masters 1000 (0–0) ATP World Tour 500 Series (0–0) ATP World Tour 250 Series (1–3)	Finals by surface Hard (1–3) Clay (0–0) Grass (0–0) Carpet (0–0)

Result	W/L	Date	Tournament	Surface	Partner	Opponents	Score
Loss	0–1	Oct 2011	St. Petersburg, Russia	Hard (i)	(Russia) Alexander Kudryavtsev	(United Kingdom) Colin Fleming (United Kingdom) Ross Hutchins	3–6, 7–6^{(7–5)}, [8–10]
Win	1–1	Oct 2013	Moscow, Russia	Hard (i)	(Uzbekistan) Denis Istomin	(United Kingdom) Ken Skupski (United Kingdom) Neal Skupski	6–2, 1–6, [14–12]
Loss	1–2	Feb 2014	Delray Beach, US	Hard	(Czech Republic) František Čermák	(United States) Bob Bryan (United States) Mike Bryan	2–6, 3–6
Loss	1–3	Feb 2017	Sofia, Bulgaria	Hard (i)	(Russia) Andrey Kuznetsov	(Serbia) Viktor Troicki (Serbia) Nenad Zimonjić	4–6, 4–6

== Futures and Challenger finals ==
=== Singles: 27 (17 titles, 10 runners-up) ===
Legend
Challengers (4–0)
Futures (13–10)

Result	No.	Date	Tournament	Surface	Opponent	Score
Loss	1.	24 June 2001	Skopje, Macedonia	Clay	(Bulgaria) Todor Enev	6–7^{(7–9)}, 4–6
Win	2.	22 July 2001	Tbilisi, Georgia	Clay	(Uzbekistan) Dmitriy Tomashevich	6–2, 6–3
Loss	3.	23 September 2001	Gorlivka, Ukraine	Clay	(Croatia) Ivan Cinkuš	5–7, 6–4, 3–6
Loss	4.	18 August 2002	Balashikha, Russia	Clay	(Russia) Igor Andreev	6–4, 3–6, 3–6
Win	5.	17 November 2002	Nonthaburi, Thailand	Hard	(Bulgaria) Todor Enev	6–4, 6–3
Loss	6.	15 June 2003	Savitaipale, Finland	Clay	(Finland) Timo Nieminen	3–6, 4–6
Loss	7.	9 December 2006	Ramat HaSharon, Israel	Hard	(Netherlands) Fred Hemmes	3–6, 4–6
Win	8.	26 May 2007	Minsk, Belarus	Hard	(Ukraine) Illya Marchenko	6–3, 6–2
Loss	9.	21 July 2007	Minsk, Belarus	Hard	(Republic of Ireland) Peter Clarke	7–5, 2–6, 3–6
Win	10.	18 August 2007	Moscow, Russia	Clay	(Russia) Mikhail Kukushkin	7–6^{(7–5)}, 7–6^{(7–5)}
Loss	11.	8 September 2007	Sergiyev Posad, Russia	Clay	(Russia) Pavel Chekhov	6–7^{(5–7)}, 6–3, 3–6
Win	12.	12 September 2007	Balashikha, Russia	Clay	(Russia) Pavel Chekhov	6–2, 4–6, 6–4
Win	13.	8 December 2007	New Delhi, India	Hard	(Czech Republic) Tomáš Cakl	7–6^{(7–4)}, 6–7^{(6–8)}, 6–3
Win	14.	3 August 2008	Saransk, Russia	Clay	(Uzbekistan) Denis Istomin	7–6^{(8–6)}, 3–6, 6–3
Win	15.	9 August 2008	Samarkand, Uzbekistan	Clay	(Brazil) André Ghem	7–6^{(7–4)}, 6–3
Win	16.	13 August 2008	Karshi, Uzbekistan	Hard	(Uzbekistan) Denis Istomin	3–6, 6–7^{(4–7)}
Win	17.	24 April 2010	Andijan, Uzbekistan	Hard	(Switzerland) Adrien Bossel	6–4, 6–4
Win	18.	5 September 2010	Moscow, Russia	Clay	(Russia) Alexander Lobkov	3–6, 7–6^{(7–5)}, 7–5
Win	19.	12 September 2010	Vsevolozhsk, Russia	Clay	(Russia) Alexander Lobkov	6–2, 6–4
Loss	20.	1 October 2010	Astana, Kazakhstan	Hard (i)	(Russia) Richard Muzaev	6–7^{(7–9)}, 6–3, 2–6
Win	21.	8 October 2010	Astana, Kazakhstan	Hard (i)	(Belgium) Dubail Julien	6–4, 7–6^{(7–1)}
Loss	22.	29 August 2011	Vsevolozhsk, Russia	Clay	(Russia) Andrey Kumantsov	4–6, 2–5, ret.
Win	23.	24 January 2015	Astana, Kazakhstan	Hard (i)	(Russia) Sanjar Fayziev	6–4, 6–4
Win	24.	31 January 2015	Astana, Kazakhstan	Hard (i)	(Belarus) Dzmitry Zhyrmont	3–6, 6–4, 7–6^{(7–5)}
Win	25.	5 September 2015	Vsevolozhsk, Russia	Clay	(Russia) Alexey Vatutin	6–4, 6–2
Win	26.	12 September 2015	Vsevolozhsk, Russia	Clay	(Belarus) Egor Gerasimov	6–3, 6–3
Loss	27.	20 August 2017	Moscow, Russia	Clay	(Russia) Evgeny Karlovskiy	2–6, 0–4 ret.

=== Doubles: 95 (62 titles, 33 runners-up) ===
Legend
Challengers (37–19)
Futures (25–14)

Result	No.	Date	Tournament	Surface	Partner	Opponents	Score
Win	1.	27 August 2000	Zhukovski, Russia	Clay	(Russia) Ruslan Nurmatov	(Russia) Sergei Krotiuk (Russia) Evgeny Smirnov	3–6, 6–3, 6–0
Loss	2.	17 June 2001	Skopje, Macedonia	Clay	(Russia) Evgeny Smirnov	(Croatia) Ivan Cinkuš (Hungary) Gergely Kisyorgy	5–7, 6–7^{(2–7)}
Win	3.	24 June 2001	Skopje, Macedonia	Clay	(Russia) Evgeny Smirnov	(Bulgaria) Todor Enev (Bulgaria) Milen Velev	5–7, 6–7^{(2–7)}
Win	4.	29 July 2001	Tbilisi, Georgia	Clay	(Russia) Artem Derepasko	(Spain) Francesc Llegal-Garres (Spain) Carlos Rexach-Itoiz	walkover
Loss	5.	6 April 2002	Karshi, Uzbekistan	Hard	(Russia) Kirill Ivanov-Smolensky	(France) Rodolphe Cadart (France) Benjamin Cassaigne	6–4, 3–6, 4–6
Win	6.	13 April 2002	Guliston, Uzbekistan	Hard	(Russia) Artem Derepasko	(France) Benjamin Cassaigne (Russia) Kirill Ivanov-Smolensky	walkover
Loss	7.	21 July 2002	Tolyatti, Russia	Hard	(Russia) Artem Derepasko	(Russia) Philipp Mukhometov (Russia) Dmitry Vlasov	4–6, 4–6
Win	8.	18 August 2002	Balashikha, Russia	Clay	(Russia) Dmitry Vlasov	(Ukraine) Aleksandr Yarmola (Ukraine) Sergei Yaroshenko	6–2, 6–7^{(2–7)}, 6–1
Loss	9.	15 September 2002	Donetsk, Ukraine	Clay	(Russia) Dmitry Vlasov	(Italy) Leonardo Azzaro (Argentina) Federico Brown	7–6^{(7–3)}, 6–7^{(4–7)}, 5–7
Loss	10.	6 April 2003	Karshi, Uzbekistan	Hard	(Russia) Dmitry Vlasov	(Czech Republic) Petr Dezort (Czech Republic) Jaroslav Levinský	5–7, 2–6
Loss	11.	15 June 2003	Savitaipale, Finland	Clay	(Russia) Ivan Syrov	(Italy) Fabio Colangelo (Italy) Alessandro Motti	5–7, 5–7
Win	12.	3 August 2003	St. Petersburg, Russia	Clay	(Ukraine) Orest Tereshchuk	(Russia) Yuriy Schukin (Russia) Dmitry Vlasov	3–6, 6–3, 7–5
Win	13.	14 August 2003	Balashikha, Russia	Clay	(Russia) Dmitry Vlasov	(Russia) Vadim Davletshin (Russia) Sergei Pozdnev	6–2, 6–2
Win	14.	15 August 2004	St. Petersburg, Russia	Clay	(Russia) Andrei Mishin	(Italy) Daniele Giorgini (Italy) Simone Vagnozzi	6–3, 5–7, 6–4
Win	15.	13 August 2005	Sergiyev Posad, Russia	Clay	(Ukraine) Mikhail Filima	(Kazakhstan) Alexey Kedryuk (Russia) Alexander Kudryavtsev	6–2, 6–4
Win	16.	20 August 2005	Noginsk, Russia	Carpet	(Ukraine) Mikhail Filima	(Russia) Konstantin Kravchuk (Russia) Alexander Pavlyuchenkov	6–2, 6–2
Win	17.	26 November 2005	Monastir, Tunisia	Hard	(Russia) Denis Matsukevich	(Germany) Martin Emmrich (Germany) Tony Holzinger	6–3, 6–0
Win	18.	12 March 2006	Cairo, Tunisia	Clay	(New Zealand) Adam Thompson	(Czech Republic) Jan Masik (Czech Republic) Michal Navrátil	6–2, 6–2
Loss	19.	26 March 2006	Cairo, Tunisia	Clay	(Czech Republic) Michal Navrátil	(Egypt) Mahmoud-Bahaa Hamed (Egypt) Sherif Sabry	walkover
Win	20.	22 April 2006	Guliston, Uzbekistan	Hard	(Kazakhstan) Alexey Kedryuk	(Russia) Konstantin Kravchuk (Russia) Alexander Kudryavtsev	5–7, 6–4, 6–4
Loss	21.	13 May 2006	Andijan, Uzbekistan	Hard	(Uzbekistan) Murad Inoyatov	(India) Sunil-Kumar Sipaeya (Russia) Dmitri Sitak	3–6, 4–6
Win	22.	11 June 2006	Gorlovka, Ukraine	Clay	(Ukraine) Aleksandr Nedovyesov	(Moldova) Andrei Gorban (Ukraine) Ernest Zurabian	7–6^{(7–4)}, 6–2
Win	23.	25 November 2006	Ramat HaSharon, Israel	Hard	(Israel) Amit Inbar	(Croatia) Roman Kelečić (Croatia) Vjekoslav Skenderović	3–6, 6–3, 7–6^{(7–5)}
Win	24.	9 December 2006	Ramat HaSharon, Israel	Hard	(New Zealand) Daniel King-Turner	(Austria) Max Raditschnigg (Switzerland) Sven Swinnen	3–6, 6–3, 6–2
Win	25.	18 March 2007	Poreč, Croatia	Clay	(Russia) Alexandre Krasnoroutskiy	(Croatia) Nikola Martinović (Croatia) Joško Topić	3–6, 6–0, 6–2
Win	26.	25 March 2007	Vrsar, Croatia	Clay	(Russia) Alexandre Krasnoroutskiy	(Czech Republic) Jan Masik (Czech Republic) Jaroslav Pospíšil	7–5, 6–0
Win	27.	17 June 2007	Minsk, Belarus	Clay	(Russia) Alexandre Krasnoroutskiy	(Spain) Cesar Ferrer-Victoria (Portugal) Leonardo Tavares	6–4, 6–0
Win	28.	23 June 2007	Minsk, Belarus	Clay	(Russia) Alexandre Krasnoroutskiy	(Ukraine) Aleksandr Nedovyesov (Latvia) Deniss Pavlovs	6–3, 6–4
Loss	29.	21 July 2007	Yerevan, Armenia	Hard	(Georgia (country)) Lado Chikhladze	(Czech Republic) Jiří Krkoška (Slovakia) Michal Pazicky	4–6, 5–7
Loss	30.	21 July 2007	Tbilisi, Georgia	Hard	(Belarus) Sergey Betov	(Czech Republic) Jiří Krkoška (Czech Republic) Daniel Lustig	6–7^{(2–7)}, 4–6
Win	31.	18 August 2007	Moscow, Russia	Clay	(Kazakhstan) Alexey Kedryuk	(Russia) Evgeny Donskoy (Czech Republic) Vladimir Karusevich	6–3, 6–0
Win	32.	1 September 2007	Sochi, Russia	Clay	(Russia) Ervand Gasparyan	(Ukraine) Aleksandr Agafonov (Ukraine) Gleb Alekseenko	6–3, 6–3
Loss	33.	8 September 2007	Sergiyev Posad, Russia	Clay	(Russia) Dmitry Vlasov	(Russia) Pavel Chekhov (Russia) Victor Kozin	2–6, 2–6
Win	34.	12 September 2007	Balashikha, Russia	Clay	(Russia) Vladimir Karusevich	(Ukraine) Vladyslav Klymenko (Ukraine) Denys Molchanov	7–6^{(7–3)}, 4–6, [10–8]
Win	35.	18 November 2007	Helsinki, Finland	Hard (i)	(Russia) Alexander Kudryavtsev	(Finland) Harri Heliövaara (Finland) Henri Kontinen	4–6, 7–5, [13–11]
Loss	36.	8 December 2007	New Delhi, India	Hard	(Russia) Pavel Chekhov	(China) Xin-Yuan Yu (China) Shao-Xuan Zeng	3–6, 3–6
Loss	37.	22 March 2008	Meknes, Morocco	Clay	(Russia) Yuriy Shukin	(Spain) Alberto Martín (Spain) Daniel Muñoz de la Nava	4–6, 7–6^{(7–2)}, [6–10]
Loss	38.	12 July 2008	Ramat HaSharon, Israel	Hard	(Ukraine) Sergey Bubka	(Israel) Jonathan Erlich (Israel) Andy Ram	3–6, 6–7^{(3–7)}
Win	39.	16 August 2008	Bukhara, Uzbekistan	Hard	(Russia) Pavel Chekhov	(Poland) Łukasz Kubot (Austria) Oliver Marach	7–6^{(7–2)}, 6–1
Win	40.	7 September 2008	Cherkassy, Ukraine	Clay	(Russia) Alexandre Krasnoroutskiy	(Ukraine) Sergey Bubka (Ukraine) Sergiy Stakhovsky	6–4, 7–5
Loss	41.	19 October 2008	Tashkent, Uzbekistan	Hard	(Russia) Alexander Kudryavtsev	(Italy) Flavio Cipolla (Czech Republic) Pavel Šnobel	3–6, 4–6
Win	42.	8 November 2008	Astana, Kazakhstan	Hard (i)	(Russia) Alexander Kudryavtsev	(Switzerland) George Bastl (Switzerland) Marco Chiudinelli	6–4, 6–7^{(8–10)}, [10–8]
Loss	43.	22 March 2009	Bangkok, Thailand	Hard	(Russia) Alexander Kudryavtsev	(United Kingdom) Josh Goodall (Australia) Joseph Sirianni	3–6, 2–6
Loss	44.	19 April 2009	Johannesburg, South Africa	Hard	(Russia) Alexander Kudryavtsev	(Switzerland) George Bastl (Australia) Chris Guccione	2–6, 6–4, [9–11]
Win	45.	25 July 2009	Penza, Russia	Hard	(Russia) Alexander Kudryavtsev	(Kazakhstan) Alexey Kedryuk (Russia) Denis Matsukevich	4–6, 6–3, [10–6]
Win	46.	2 August 2009	Saransk, Russia	Clay	(Russia) Evgeny Kirillov	(Kazakhstan) Alexey Kedryuk (Russia) Denis Matsukevich	6–2, 6–1
Loss	47.	24 April 2010	Andijan, Uzbekistan	Hard	(Kazakhstan) Alexey Kedryuk	(Russia) Alexander Kudryavtsev (Ukraine) Denys Molchanov	2–6, 2–6
Win	48.	1 May 2010	Namangan, Uzbekistan	Hard	(Kazakhstan) Alexey Kedryuk	(India) Rohan Gajjar (India) Karan Rastogi	6–4, 7–6^{(7–3)}
Win	49.	24 July 2010	Penza, Russia	Hard	(Austria) Nikolaus Moser	(Belarus) Aliaksandr Bury (Belarus) Kiryl Harbatsiuk	6–4, 6–4
Win	50.	1 August 2010	Saransk, Russia	Clay	(Russia) Ilya Belyaev	(Ukraine) Denys Molchanov (Ukraine) Artem Smirnov	3–6, 7–6^{(8–6)}, [11–9]
Win	51.	7 August 2010	Moscow, Russia	Clay	(Russia) Ilya Belyaev	(Kazakhstan) Alexey Kedryuk (Russia) Denis Matsukevich	6–2, 6–2
Win	52.	29 August 2010	Astana, Kazakhstan	Hard (i)	(Austria) Nikolaus Moser	(China) Di Wu (China) Ze Zhang	6–0, 6–4
Win	53.	5 September 2010	Moscow, Russia	Clay	(Latvia) Deniss Pavlovs	(Russia) Alexander Lobkov (Russia) Alexander Rumyantsev	4–6, 6–4, [10–7]
Win	54.	8 October 2010	Astana, Kazakhstan	Hard (i)	(Belarus) Andrei Vasilevski	(Belarus) Sergey Betov (Kazakhstan) Alexey Kedryuk	5–7, 6–4, [10–4]
Loss	55.	7 November 2010	Astana, Kazakhstan	Hard (i)	(Russia) Alexander Kudryavtsev	(United Kingdom) Colin Fleming (United Kingdom) Ross Hutchins	3–6, 6–7^{(10–12)}
Win	56.	13 November 2010	Ortisei, Italy	Clay	(Russia) Alexander Kudryavtsev	(Poland) Tomasz Bednarek (Poland) Michał Przysiężny	3–6, 6–3, [10–3]
Loss	57.	6 February 2011	Kazan, Russia	Hard (i)	(Russia) Alexander Kudryavtsev	(Switzerland) Yves Allegro (Germany) Andreas Beck	4–6, 4–6
Loss	58.	13 February 2011	Bergamo, Italy	Hard (i)	(Russia) Alexander Kudryavtsev	(Denmark) Frederik Nielsen (United Kingdom) Ken Skupski	walkover
Win	59.	19 March 2011	Guangzhou, China	Hard	(Russia) Alexander Kudryavtsev	(Thailand) Sanchai Ratiwatana (Thailand) Sonchat Ratiwatana	7–6^{(7–3)}, 6–3
Win	60.	27 March 2011	Pingguo, China	Hard	(Russia) Alexander Kudryavtsev	(Finland) Harri Heliövaara (New Zealand) Jose Statham	6–3, 6–2
Win	61.	10 July 2011	Pozoblanco, Spain	Hard	(Russia) Alexander Kudryavtsev	(Ukraine) Illya Marchenko (Ukraine) Denys Molchanov	walkover
Win	62.	13 August 2011	Samarkand, Uzbekistan	Clay	(Russia) Alexander Kudryavtsev	(Moldova) Radu Albot (Russia) Andrey Kuznetsov	7–6^{(7–4)}, 2–6, [10–7]
Win	63.	21 August 2011	Karshi, Uzbekistan	Hard	(Russia) Alexander Kudryavtsev	(Russia) Konstantin Kravchuk (Ukraine) Denys Molchanov	3–6, 6–3, [11–9]
Win	64.	11 November 2012	Bratislava, Slovakia	Hard (i)	(Czech Republic) Lukáš Dlouhý	(Germany) Philipp Marx (Romania) Florin Mergea	6–7^{(5–7)}, 6–2, [10–6]
Win	65.	18 November 2012	Helsinki, Finland	Hard (i)	(Slovakia) Igor Zelenay	(Belarus) Uladzimir Ignatik (Chinese Taipei) Jimmy Wang	4–6, 7–6^{(7–0)}, [10–4]
Loss	66.	30 March 2013	Novokuznetsk, Russia	Hard (i)	(Russia) Alexander Kudryavtsev	(Belarus) Sergey Betov (Russia) Mikhail Biryukov	1–6, 6–7^{(3–7)}
Loss	67.	4 August 2013	Segovia, Spain	Hard	(Belarus) Uladzimir Ignatik	(United Kingdom) Ken Skupski (United Kingdom) Neal Skupski	3–6, 7–6^{(7–4)}, [6–10]
Win	68.	13 October 2013	Tashkent, Uzbekistan	Hard	(Russia) Teymuraz Gabashvili	(India) Purav Raja (India) Divij Sharan	6–4, 6–4
Win	69.	23 March 2014	Panama City, Panama	Clay	(Czech Republic) František Čermák	(Argentina) Martín Alund (Argentina) Guillermo Durán	4–6, 6–3, [10–8]
Loss	70.	23 March 2014	Barranquilla, Colombia	Clay	(Czech Republic) František Čermák	(Argentina) Pablo Cuevas (Argentina) Pere Riba	4–6, 3–6
Loss	71.	24 January 2015	Astana, Kazakhstan	Hard (i)	(Russia) Karen Khachanov	(Belarus) Yaraslau Shyla (Belarus) Andrei Vasilevski	6–3, 6–7^{(2–7)}, [4–10]
Win	72.	22 March 2015	Kazan, Russia	Hard	(Slovakia) Igor Zelenay	(Italy) Andrea Arnaboldi (Italy) Matteo Viola	6–3, 6–3
Loss	73.	26 April 2015	Vercelli, Italy	Clay	(Belarus) Sergey Betov	(Italy) Andrea Arnaboldi (Chile) Hans Podlipnik-Castillo	6–7^{(5–7)}, 7–5, [10–3]
Loss	74.	9 May 2015	Qarshi, Uzbekistan	Hard	(Belarus) Sergey Betov	(India) Yuki Bhambri (Spain) Adrián Menéndez Maceiras	5–7, 6–3, [10–8]
Win	75.	16 May 2015	Samarkand, Uzbekistan	Clay	(Belarus) Sergey Betov	(Serbia) Laslo Djere (Serbia) Peđa Krstin	6–4, 6–3
Win	76.	21 May 2015	Eskişehir, Turkey	Hard	(Belarus) Sergey Betov	(Chinese Taipei) Chen Ti (South Africa) Ruan Roelofse	6–4, 6–7^{(2–7)}, [10–7]
Win	77.	20 June 2015	Fergana, Uzbekistan	Hard	(Belarus) Sergey Betov	(Ukraine) Denys Molchanov (Croatia) Franko Škugor	6–3, 7–5
Win	78.	5 July 2015	Padua, Italy	Clay	(Russia) Evgeny Donskoy	(Italy) Federico Gaio (Italy) Alessandro Giannessi	6–4, 7–6^{(7–4)}
Win	79.	11 July 2015	Braunschweig, Germany	Clay	(Belarus) Sergey Betov	(Bosnia and Herzegovina) Damir Džumhur (Croatia) Franko Škugor	3–6, 6–1, [10–5]
Win	80.	11 July 2015	Poznań, Poland	Clay	(Poland) Mateusz Kowalczyk	(Chile) Julio Peralta (United States) Matt Seeberger	3–6, 6–3, [10–6]
Loss	81.	15 August 2015	Prague, Czech Republic	Clay	(Belarus) Sergey Betov	(Netherlands) Wesley Koolhof (Netherlands) Matwé Middelkoop	4–6, 6–3, [7–10]
Win	82.	16 October 2015	Tashkent, Uzbekistan	Hard	(Belarus) Sergey Betov	(Germany) Andre Begemann (Australia) Artem Sitak	6–4, 6–4
Loss	83.	30 July 2016	Astana, Kazakhstan	Hard	(Russia) Alexander Kudryavtsev	(Belarus) Yaraslav Shyla (Belarus) Andrei Vasilevski	4–6, 4–6
Win	84.	21 August 2016	Meerbusch, Germany	Clay	(Belarus) Andrei Vasilevski	(Belgium) Sander Gillé (Belgium) Joran Vliegen	7–6^{(8–6)}, 6–4
Win	85.	14 October 2016	Tashkent, Uzbekistan	Hard	(Uzbekistan) Denis Istomin	(Germany) Andre Begemann (India) Leander Paes	6–4, 6–2
Win	86.	29 October 2016	Suzhou, China	Hard	(Russia) Alexander Kudryavtsev	(Italy) Andrea Arnaboldi (France) Jonathan Eysseric	4–6, 6–1, [10–7]
Win	87.	19 November 2016	Brescia, Italy	Carpet (i)	(Russia) Alexander Kudryavtsev	(Netherlands) Wesley Koolhof (Netherlands) Matwé Middelkoop	7–6^{(7–4)}, 6–3
Loss	88.	14 October 2016	Astana, Kazakhstan	Hard (i)	(Uzbekistan) Denis Istomin	(Kazakhstan) Timur Khabibulin (Kazakhstan) Aleksandr Nedovyesov	6–7^{(7–9)}, 2–6
Win	89.	29 January 2017	Rennes, France	Hard (i)	(Russia) Evgeny Donskoy	(Austria) Julian Knowle (United Kingdom) Jonathan Marray	6–4, 3–6, [11–9]
Win	90.	5 February 2017	Quimper, France	Hard (i)	(Slovakia) Igor Zelenay	(United Kingdom) Ken Skupski (United Kingdom) Neal Skupski	2–6, 7–5, [10–5]
Loss	91.	5 March 2017	Wrocław, Poland	Hard (i)	(Ukraine) Denys Molchanov	(Canada) Adil Shamasdin (Belarus) Andrei Vasilevski	3–6, 6–3, [19–21]
Loss	92.	26 August 2017	Manerbio, Italy	Clay	(Czech Republic) Roman Jebavý	(Monaco) Romain Arneodo (France) Hugo Nys	6–4, 6–7^{(3–7)}, [5–10]
Win	93.	24 November 2017	Bangalore, India	Hard	(India) Divij Sharan	(Croatia) Ivan Sabanov (Croatia) Matej Sabanov	6–3, 6–0
Loss	94.	19 May 2018	Samarkand, Uzbekistan	Clay	(Uzbekistan) Denis Istomin	(India) Sriram Balaji (India) Vishnu Vardhan	walkover
Win	95.	21 July 2018	Astana, Kazakhstan	Hard	(Belarus) Yaraslav Shyla	(India) Arjun Kadhe (Kazakhstan) Denis Yevseyev	7–5, 7–6^{(8–6)}

== Career statistics ==
=== Doubles performance timeline ===
Key
W	F	SF	QF	#R	RR	Q#	DNQ	A	NH

(W) winner; (F) finalist; (SF) semifinalist; (QF) quarterfinalist; (#R) rounds 4, 3, 2, 1; (RR) round-robin stage; (Q#) qualification round; (DNQ) did not qualify; (A) absent; (NH) not held; (SR) strike rate (events won / competed); (W–L) win–loss record.
To avoid confusion and double counting, these charts are updated at the conclusion of a tournament or when the player's participation has ended.

Tournament	2008	2009	2010	2011	2012	2013	2014	2015	2016	2017	2018	SR	W–L
Grand Slam tournaments
Australian Open	A	A	A	A	2R	1R	1R	A	2R	A	1R	0 / 5	2–5
French Open	A	A	A	A	3R	2R	1R	A	1R	2R	A	0 / 5	4–5
Wimbledon	1R	Q1	A	Q1	3R	1R	1R	A	A	1R	A	0 / 5	2–5
US Open	A	A	A	A	1R	2R	1R	A	A	2R		0 / 4	2–4
Win–loss	0–1	0–0	0–0	0–0	5–4	2–4	0–4	0–0	1–2	2–3	0–1	0 / 19	10–19
