= Riviera di Rimini Challenger =

ATP Challenger Tour
- Event name: Rimini
- Location: Rimini, Italy
- Venue: Circolo Tennis Rimini
- Category: ATP Challenger Tour
- Surface: Clay (red)
- Draw: 32S/32Q/16D
- Prize money: €42,500+H
- Website: www.ctrimini.it

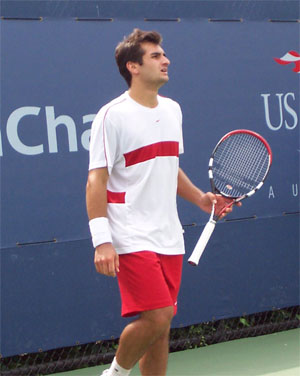
Frenchman Florent Serra defeated Iván Navarro to take the 2005 singles title

The Riviera di Rimini Challenger is a professional tennis tournament played on outdoor red clay courts. It is currently part of the Association of Tennis Professionals (ATP) Challenger Tour. It is held annually at the Circolo Tennis Rimini in Rimini, Italy, since 2004.

== Past finals ==
=== Singles ===
Year	Champion	Runner-up	Score
2010	(Italy) Paolo Lorenzi	(Argentina) Federico del Bonis	6–2, 6–0
2009	(Brazil) Thomaz Bellucci	(Argentina) Juan Pablo Brzezicki	3–6, 6–3, 6–1
2008	(Argentina) Diego Junqueira	(Italy) Walter Trusendi	6–4, 6–3
2007	(Austria) Oliver Marach	(Austria) Daniel Köllerer	4–6, 2–0 retired
2006	(Spain) Pablo Andújar	(Austria) Werner Eschauer	3–6, 6–1, 7–5
2005	(France) Florent Serra	(Spain) Iván Navarro	6–3, 6–1
2004	(Italy) Tomas Tenconi	(Spain) Álex Calatrava	6–2, 6–1

=== Doubles ===
Year	Champions	Runners-up	Score
2010	(Italy) Giulio Di Meo (Romania) Adrian Ungur	(Argentina) Juan Pablo Brzezicki (Austria) Alexander Peya	7–6(6), 3–6, [10–7]
2009	(Germany) Matthias Bachinger (Germany) Dieter Kindlmann	(Italy) Leonardo Azzaro (Italy) Marco Crugnola	6–4, 6–2
2008	(Italy) Leonardo Azzaro (Italy) Marco Crugnola	(Romania) Cătălin Gârd (Netherlands) Matwé Middelkoop	6–1, 6–1
2007	(Spain) Carles Poch Gradin (Spain) Santiago Ventura	(Italy) Leonardo Azzaro (Italy) Alessandro Motti	6–4, 6–1
2006	(Argentina) Juan Pablo Brzezicki (Argentina) Cristian Villagrán	(Greece) Vasilis Mazarakis (Romania) Gabriel Moraru	6–2, 5–7, 10–6
2005	(Czech Republic) David Škoch (Czech Republic) Martin Stepanek	(Germany) Christopher Kas (Germany) Philipp Petzschner	6–3, 6–7(1), 6–1
2004	(Italy) Daniele Bracciali (Italy) Giorgio Galimberti	(Italy) Stefano Cobolli (Italy) Vincenzo Santopadre	walkover
