= Aleksandr Yarmola =

Ukrainian tennis player

- Full name: Aleksandr Mykolayovych Yarmola
- Country (sports): Ukraine
- Born: 6 October 1978 (age 46)
- Prize money: $38,030

Singles
- Highest ranking: No. 622 (1 Oct 2007)

Doubles
- Highest ranking: No. 419 (27 Aug 2007)
Medal record
Summer Universiade
Bronze medal – third place	1997 Sicily	Men's doubles

Aleksandr Mykolayovych Yarmola (born 6 October 1978) is a Ukrainian former professional tennis player.

Yarmola, a doubles bronze medalist at the 1997 Summer Universiade, competed in satellite, ITF Futures and ATP Challenger tournaments at professional level. He won the doubles title at the Donetsk Challenger in 2006, partnering Oleksandr Nedovyesov. His career best rankings of 622 for singles and 419 for doubles were both reached in 2007.

== Challenger/Futures titles ==
Legend
ATP Challenger (1)
ITF Futures (1)

=== Doubles: (2) ===
No.	Date	Tournament	Tier	Surface	Partner	Opponents	Score
1.	Sep 2006	Alexander Kolyaskin Memorial, Donetsk	Challenger	Hard	(Ukraine) Aleksandr Nedovyesov	(Ukraine) Aleksandr Aksyonov (Ukraine) Vladyslav Klymenko	6–4, 6–2
2.	Jul 2008	Georgia F1, Tbilisi	Futures	Clay	(Ukraine) Ivan Anikanov	(Russia) Alexei Filenkov (Serbia) David Savić	6–1, 6–3
