= Juan Pablo Brzezicki =

Argentine tennis player

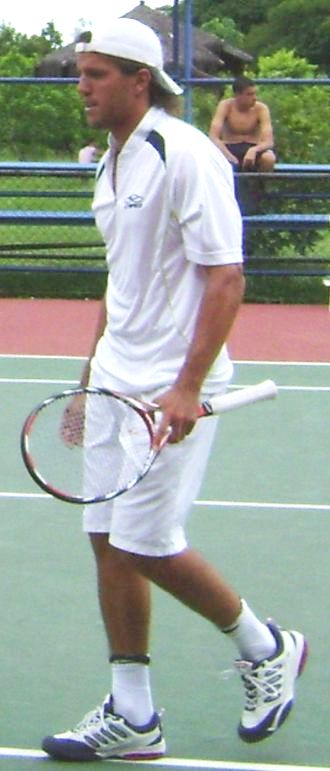
- Country (sports): Argentina
- Residence: Buenos Aires, Argentina
- Born: 12 April 1982 (age 43) Buenos Aires, Argentina
- Height: 1.77 m (5 ft 9 1/2 in)
- Turned pro: 2001
- Retired: 2012
- Plays: Right-handed (two-handed backhand)
- Prize money: $629,845

Singles
- Career record: 6–18
- Career titles: 0
- Highest ranking: No. 94 (4 February 2008)

Grand Slam singles results
- Australian Open: 1R (2008)
- French Open: 3R (2007)
- Wimbledon: Q2 (2009, 2010)
- US Open: 1R (2009)

Doubles
- Career record: 12–10
- Career titles: 1
- Highest ranking: No. 87 (13 June 2005)

Grand Slam doubles results
- Australian Open: 2R (2008)
- French Open: 2R (2005)
- Last updated on: 13 June 2021.

Juan Pablo Brzezicki (born 12 April 1982) is a retired Argentine professional tennis player.

== Tennis career ==
In 2007, Brzezicki was the Argentine surprise at the French Open, one of the four tennis Grand Slams, by reaching the third round before losing to his idol Carlos Moyá of Spain. He won his first Challenger singles title in 2007 at Salinas, Ecuador. With Juan Pablo Guzmán, he won his first ATP doubles title at Amersfoort in 2007. He reached a career-high singles ranking of World No. 94 in February 2008.

In February 2012, after his participation in the ATP 250 in Buenos Aires he announced that he retired after eleven years.

== Performance timeline ==
Key
W	F	SF	QF	#R	RR	Q#	DNQ	A	NH

(W) winner; (F) finalist; (SF) semifinalist; (QF) quarterfinalist; (#R) rounds 4, 3, 2, 1; (RR) round-robin stage; (Q#) qualification round; (DNQ) did not qualify; (A) absent; (NH) not held; (SR) strike rate (events won / competed); (W–L) win–loss record.

=== Singles ===
Tournament]	2003	2004	2005	2006	2007	2008	2009	2010	2011	2012	SR	W–L	Win %
Grand Slam tournaments
Australian Open	A	Q2	Q2	A	A	1R	A	A	A	Q1	0 / 1	0–1	0%
French Open	A	Q2	1R	Q1	3R	A	Q1	Q1	Q1	A	0 / 2	2–2	50%
Wimbledon	A	Q1	A	A	A	A	Q2	Q2	A	A	0 / 0	0–0	–
US Open	Q2	A	Q3	A	Q2	A	1R	Q1	A	A	0 / 1	0–1	0%
Win–loss	0–0	0–0	0–1	0–0	2–1	0–1	0–1	0–0	0–0	0–0	0 / 4	2–4	33%
ATP Tour Masters 1000
Indian Wells Masters	A	A	Q1	Q1	A	A	A	A	A	A	0 / 0	0–0	–
Miami Masters	A	A	A	A	A	Q1	A	Q1	A	A	0 / 0	0–0	–
Win–loss	0–0	0–0	0–0	0–0	0–0	0–0	0–0	0–0	0–0	0–0	0 / 0	0–0	–

== ATP career finals ==
=== Doubles: 1 (1 title) ===
Legend Grand Slam tournaments (0–0) ATP World Tour Finals (0–0) ATP World Tour Masters 1000 (0–0) ATP World Tour 500 Series (0–0) ATP World Tour 250 Series (1–0)	Finals by surface Hard (0–0) Clay (1–0) Grass (0–0)	Finals by setting Outdoor (1–0) Indoor (0–0)

Result	W–L	Date	Tournament	Tier	Surface	Partner	Opponents	Score
Win	1–0	Jul 2007	Dutch Open, Netherlands	International	Clay	(Argentina) Juan Pablo Guzmán	(Netherlands) Rogier Wassen (Netherlands) Robin Haase	6–2, 6–0

== ATP Challenger and ITF Futures finals ==
=== Singles: 23 (7–16) ===
Legend ATP Challenger (1–10) ITF Futures (6–6)	Finals by surface Hard (2–4) Clay (5–12) Grass (0–0) Carpet (0–0)

Result	W–L	Date	Tournament	Tier	Surface	Opponent	Score
Loss	0–1	May 2000	Argentina F6, Misiones	Futures	Clay	(Argentina) Diego Hipperdinger	3–6, 1–6
Loss	0–2	Aug 2000	Argentina F8, Córdoba	Futures	Clay	(Argentina) Rafael Serpa-Guinazu	5–7, 3–6
Win	1–2	Aug 2001	Argentina F9, Buenos Aires	Futures	Clay	(Argentina) Luciano Vitullo	7–6^{(7–2)}, 6–4
Win	2–2	Sep 2001	Argentina F10, Córdoba	Futures	Clay	(Argentina) Agustin Tarantino	6–2, 6–1
Win	3–2	Sep 2001	Argentina F11, Buenos Aires	Futures	Clay	(Argentina) Juan Pablo Guzmán	7–5, 7–5
Win	4–2	Mar 2002	Mexico F1, Chetumal	Futures	Hard	(Federal Republic of Yugoslavia) Janko Tipsarević	6–3, 6–4
Loss	4–3	Mar 2002	Mexico F3, Aguascalientes	Futures	Clay	(Brazil) Ronaldo Carvalho	2–6, 6–2, 4–6
Win	5–3	Jan 2003	El Salvador F1, San Salvador	Futures	Clay	(Netherlands) Rogier Wassen	6–3, 6–1
Loss	5–4	Jan 2003	Guatemala F1, Guatemala City	Futures	Hard	(Brazil) Bruno Soares	4–6, 3–6
Win	6–4	Mar 2003	Portugal F4, Lisbon	Futures	Clay	(Germany) Florian Mayer	6–3, 6–2
Loss	6–5	Jul 2003	Tolyatti, Russia	Challenger	Hard	(Israel) Dudi Sela	2–6, 4–6
Loss	6–6	Feb 2004	Canada F2, Edmonton	Futures	Hard	(United States) Rajeev Ram	6–3, 5–7, 1–6
Loss	6–7	Mar 2004	Australia F2, Devonport	Futures	Hard	(South Africa) Rik de Voest	3–6, 6–7^{(5–7)}
Loss	6–8	Apr 2004	Canberra, Australia	Challenger	Clay	(Australia) Peter Luczak	2–6, 1–6
Loss	6–9	Aug 2004	Poznań, Poland	Challenger	Clay	(Czech Republic) Tomáš Zíb	7–6^{(7–4)}, 6–7^{(3–7)}, 3–6
Loss	6–10	Jan 2007	La Serena, Chile	Challenger	Clay	(Argentina) Mariano Zabaleta	2–6, 4–6
Win	7–10	Mar 2007	Salinas, Ecuador	Challenger	Hard	(Brazil) Marcos Daniel	6–4, 6–4
Loss	7–11	Mar 2007	Tunica Resorts, United States	Challenger	Clay	(Uruguay) Pablo Cuevas	4–6, 6–4, 3–6
Loss	7–12	Jul 2008	Oberstaufen, Germany	Challenger	Clay	(Poland) Łukasz Kubot	3–6, 4–6
Loss	7–13	Jun 2009	Furth, Germany	Challenger	Clay	(Australia) Peter Luczak	2–6, 0–6
Loss	7–14	Jul 2009	Rimini, Italy	Challenger	Clay	(Brazil) Thomaz Bellucci	6–3, 3–6, 1–6
Loss	7–15	Jan 2010	Bucaramanga, Colombia	Challenger	Clay	(Argentina) Eduardo Schwank	4–6, 2–6
Loss	7–16	Nov 2010	Buenos Aires, Argentina	Challenger	Clay	(Argentina) Diego Junqueira	2–6, 1–6

=== Doubles: 36 (21–15) ===
Legend ATP Challenger (12–9) ITF Futures (9–6)	Finals by surface Hard (4–2) Clay (17–13) Grass (0–0) Carpet (0–0)

Result	W–L	Date	Tournament	Tier	Surface	Partner	Opponents	Score
Loss	0–1	May 2000	Argentina F4, Mendoza	Futures	Clay	(Chile) Miguel Miranda	(Argentina) Sergio Roitman (Argentina) Juan Pablo Guzmán	3–6, 4–6
Win	1–1	Jul 2000	Argentina F7, Concordia	Futures	Clay	(Argentina) Cristian Villagrán	(Argentina) Sebastián Decoud (Argentina) Patricio Arquez	6–3, 6–1
Win	2–1	Oct 2000	Bolivia F3, Santa Cruz	Futures	Clay	(Argentina) Cristian Villagrán	(Chile) Miguel Miranda (Chile) Jaime Fillol Jr.	7–5, 6–3
Win	3–1	Oct 2000	Paraguay F1, Asunción	Futures	Clay	(Argentina) Cristian Villagrán	(Brazil) Márcio Carlsson (Brazil) Ricardo Schlachter	7–5, 6–3
Loss	3–2	Aug 2001	Argentina F8, Buenos Aires	Futures	Clay	(Argentina) Cristian Villagrán	(Argentina) Daniel Caracciolo (Argentina) Martín Vassallo Argüello	2–6, 6–7^{(2–7)}
Win	4–2	Sep 2001	Argentina F10, Córdoba	Futures	Clay	(Argentina) Carlos Berlocq	(Argentina) Daniel Caracciolo (Argentina) Andres Dellatorre	4–6, 6–4, 6–2
Loss	4–3	Mar 2002	Mexico F3, Aguascalientes	Futures	Clay	(Cuba) Lazaro Navarro-Batles	(Mexico) Bruno Echagaray (Mexico) Santiago González	4–6, 5–7
Loss	4–4	Jun 2002	Poland F3, Szczecin	Futures	Clay	(Russia) Sergei Pozdnev	(Norway) Stian Boretti (Finland) Lauri Kiiski	3–6, 2–6
Win	5–4	Sep 2002	Spain F13, Oviedo	Futures	Clay	(Argentina) Carlos Berlocq	(Spain) Antonio Baldellou-Esteva (Spain) Gabriel Trujillo Soler	4–6, 6–1, 6–4
Loss	5–5	Sep 2002	Spain F15, Barcelona	Futures	Clay	(Argentina) Carlos Berlocq	(Spain) Marc Fornell Mestres (Spain) Mariano Albert-Ferrando	6–7^{(5–7)}, 5–7
Win	6–5	Jan 2003	El Salvador F2, La Libertad	Futures	Hard	(Brazil) Bruno Soares	(Colombia) Carlos Salamanca (Colombia) Alejandro Falla	4–6, 6–4, 7–6^{(7–3)}
Win	7–5	Mar 2003	Portugal F4, Lisbon	Futures	Clay	(Argentina) Diego Junqueira	(Brazil) Eduardo Bohrer (Chile) Juan-Felipe Yáñez	6–3, 2–6, 6–1
Win	8–5	Apr 2003	Mexico F1, Naucalpan	Futures	Hard	(Argentina) Carlos Berlocq	(Spain) Esteban Carril (Argentina) Andres Dellatorre	walkover
Win	9–5	Mar 2004	Australia F1, Burnie	Futures	Hard	(South Africa) Louis Vosloo	(Australia) Peter Luczak (Australia) Jaymon Crabb	3–6, 6–1, 16–14
Loss	9–6	Mar 2004	Australia F2, Devonport	Futures	Hard	(South Africa) Louis Vosloo	(Australia) Nathan Healey (Australia) Robert Smeets	4–6, 6–7^{(5–7)}
Loss	9–7	Jul 2004	Scheveningen, Netherlands	Challenger	Clay	(Italy) Enzo Artoni	(Netherlands) Paul Logtens (Netherlands) Raemon Sluiter	2–6, 5–7
Loss	9–8	Sep 2004	Brașov, Romania	Challenger	Clay	(Argentina) Juan Pablo Guzmán	(Spain) Salvador Navarro-Gutierrez (Spain) Rubén Ramírez Hidalgo	3–6, 2–6
Win	10–8	Sep 2004	Budapest, Hungary	Challenger	Clay	(Argentina) Mariano Delfino	(Argentina) Juan Pablo Guzmán (Argentina) Ignacio González King	2–6, 6–3, 6–2
Win	11–8	Oct 2004	Dubrovnik, Croatia	Challenger	Clay	(Argentina) Martín Vassallo Argüello	(Italy) Leonardo Azzaro (Russia) Yuri Schukin	6–1, 6–2
Win	12–8	Oct 2004	Salinas, Ecuador	Challenger	Hard	(Argentina) Cristian Villagrán	(Argentina) Juan Pablo Guzmán (Argentina) Sergio Roitman	6–2, 6–4
Loss	12–9	Mar 2005	San Luis Potosí, Mexico	Challenger	Clay	(Argentina) Juan Pablo Guzmán	(Poland) Łukasz Kubot (Austria) Oliver Marach	1–6, 6–3, 3–6
Loss	12–10	May 2005	Tunica Resorts, United States	Challenger	Clay	(Argentina) Juan Pablo Guzmán	(United States) Michael Russell (Serbia and Montenegro) Dušan Vemić	6–7^{(4–7)}, 3–6
Win	13–10	Jun 2005	Sassuolo, Italy	Challenger	Clay	(Argentina) Cristian Villagrán	(Chile) Paul Capdeville (Italy) Simone Vagnozzi	7–6^{(7–5)}, 6–2
Win	14–10	Jun 2005	Lugano, Switzerland	Challenger	Clay	(Italy) Enzo Artoni	(Poland) Mariusz Fyrstenberg (Sweden) Robert Lindstedt	4–6, 6–2, 6–2
Win	15–10	Feb 2006	Florianópolis, Brazil	Challenger	Clay	(Argentina) Cristian Villagrán	(Italy) Gianluca Naso (United States) Mirko Pehar	7–6^{(7–3)}, 6–2
Win	16–10	Jul 2006	Rimini, Italy	Challenger	Clay	(Argentina) Cristian Villagrán	(Greece) Vasilis Mazarakis (Romania) Gabriel Moraru	6–2, 5–7, [10–6]
Win	17–10	Nov 2006	Guayaquil, Ecuador	Challenger	Clay	(Argentina) Leonardo Mayer	(Uruguay) Marcel Felder (Spain) Fernando Vicente	1–6, 7–5, [14–12]
Win	18–10	May 2007	Naples, United States	Challenger	Clay	(Argentina) Leonardo Mayer	(Uruguay) Pablo Cuevas (Argentina) Horacio Zeballos	6–1, 6–7^{(4–7)}, [10–8]
Loss	18–11	Sep 2007	Szczecin, Poland	Challenger	Clay	(Argentina) Juan Pablo Guzmán	(Germany) Tomas Behrend (Germany) Christopher Kas	0–6, 7–5, [8–10]
Win	19–11	Sep 2008	Ljubljana, Slovenia	Challenger	Clay	(Argentina) Mariano Hood	(Australia) Rameez Junaid (Germany) Philipp Marx	7–5, 7–6^{(7–4)}
Loss	19–12	Jan 2009	Salinas, Ecuador	Challenger	Hard	(Peru) Iván Miranda	(Thailand) Sonchat Ratiwatana (Thailand) Sanchai Ratiwatana	3–6, 6–7^{(5–7)}
Win	20–12	Mar 2009	Caltanissetta, Italy	Challenger	Clay	(Spain) David Marrero	(Italy) Simone Vagnozzi (Italy) Daniele Bracciali	7–6^{(7–5)}, 6–3
Win	21–12	Oct 2009	Montevideo, Uruguay	Challenger	Clay	(Spain) David Marrero	(Uruguay) Martín Cuevas (Uruguay) Pablo Cuevas	6–4, 6–4
Loss	21–13	Oct 2009	Santiago, Chile	Challenger	Clay	(Spain) David Marrero	(Argentina) Diego Cristin (Argentina) Eduardo Schwank	4–6, 5–7
Loss	21–14	Apr 2010	Rome, Italy	Challenger	Clay	(Spain) Rubén Ramírez Hidalgo	(Croatia) Mario Ančić (Croatia) Ivan Dodig	6–4, 6–7^{(8–10)}, [4–10]
Loss	21–15	Jul 2010	Rimini, Italy	Challenger	Clay	(Austria) Alexander Peya	(Italy) Giulio Di Meo (Romania) Adrian Ungur	6–7^{(68)}, 6–3, [7–10]
