= Giulio Di Meo =

Italian tennis player

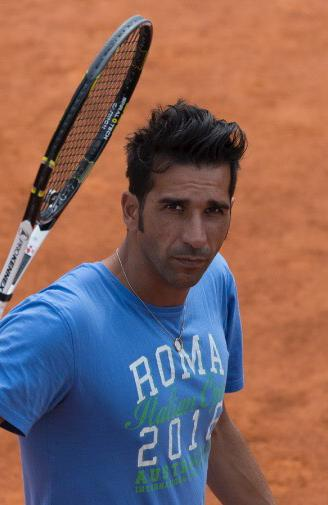
- Giulio Di Meo in 2018

Personal information
- Nationality: Italian
- Born: 26 August 1982 (age 43) Velletri, Rome

Sport
- Sport: Table tennis
- Playing style: Right-Handed, One-Handed Backhand
- Highest ranking: 565 (Singles) - 497 (Doubles)
Medal record
ITF World Team and Individual Championships (Over 35 - Miami 2019) - ITF World Team and Individual Championships (Over 40 - Lisbon 2022)

Giulio Di Meo (born 26 August 1982) is an Italian tennis player. Di Meo has a career-high ATP singles ranking of 565 achieved on 2 March 2009. He also has a career-high doubles ranking of 497 achieved on 7 February 2011.

Di Meo has won 1 ATP Challenger doubles title at the 2010 Riviera di Rimini Challenger.

Di Meo has won the ITF World Team and Individual Championships twice. In 2019 in Miami and in 2022 in Lisbon.

== Tour titles ==
Legend
Grand Slam (0)
ATP Masters Series (0)
ATP Tour (0)
Challengers (1)

=== Doubles ===
Result	Date	Category	Tournament	Surface	Partner	Opponents	Score
Winner	July 2010	Challenger	Rimini, Italy	Clay	(Romania) Adrian Ungur	(Argentina) Juan Pablo Brzezicki (Austria) Alexander Peya	7–6^{(8–6)}, 3–6, [10–7]
