= Leonardo Azzaro =

Italian tennis player (born 1978)

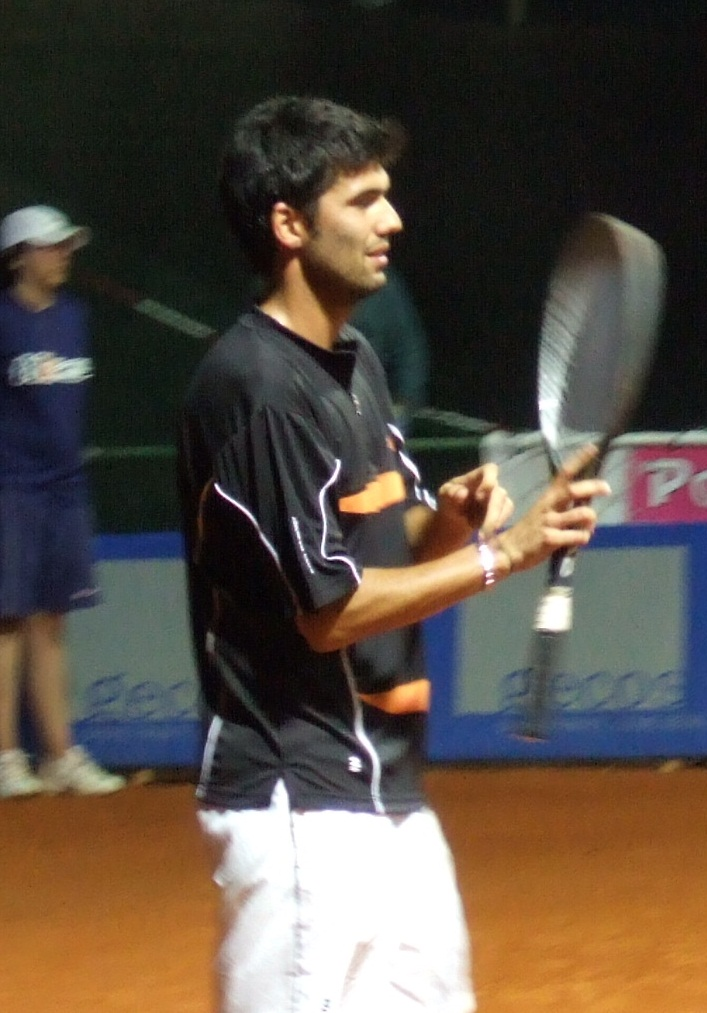
- Leonardo Azzaro at the 2006 Riviera di Rimini Challenger
- Country (sports): Italy
- Born: 30 May 1978 (age 48) Florence, Italy
- Height: 1.88 m (6 ft 2 in)
- Turned pro: 1997
- Plays: Left-handed
- Prize money: $320,082

Singles
- Career record: 0–3
- Career titles: 0
- Highest ranking: No. 180 (1 November 2004)

Doubles
- Career record: 3–10
- Career titles: 0
- Highest ranking: No. 94 (14 August 2006)

Grand Slam doubles results
- Australian Open: 1R (2007)
- Wimbledon: 1R (2006)
- US Open: 1R (2007)

Leonardo Azzaro (Italian pronunciation: [leoˈnardo atˈtsaːro, – adˈdz-]; born 30 May 1978) is a former professional tennis player from Italy.

== Career ==
Azzaro won a silver medal for Italy at the 2001 Mediterranean Games in Tunisia. He defeated Slovenian Marko Tkalec in the semi-final, before losing the gold medal play-off to Konstantinos Economidis of Greece.

The left-handed player appeared in the main draw of three Grand Slams, all in the Men's Doubles, but never made it past the first round. At the 2007 US Open, Azzaro and his partner Filippo Volandri had to face the second seeds, Mark Knowles and Daniel Nestor.

He retired in 2010, having won 20 ITF Futures titles, seven of them in singles, as well as winning 17 Challenger trophies for doubles.

== Challenger titles ==
=== Singles: (1) ===
No.	Year	Tournament	Surface	Opponent	Score
1.	2004	Aschaffenburg, Germany	Clay	(Germany) Tobias Summerer	6–4, 6–7^{(7–9)}, 7–6^{(7–2)}

=== Doubles: (17) ===
No.	Year	Tournament	Surface	Partner	Opponents	Score
1.	2001	San Benedetto, Italy	Clay	(Italy) Stefano Galvani	(Australia) Stephen Huss (Australia) Lee Pearson	3–6, 7–6^{(9–7)}, 6–4
2.	2002	Sassuolo, Italy	Clay	(Italy) Potito Starace	(Italy) Manuel Jorquera (Argentina) Diego Moyano	6–3, 6–2
3.	2002	Donetsk, Ukraine	Clay	(Argentina) Federico Browne	(Russia) Mikhail Elgin (Russia) Dmitry Vlasov	6–7^{(3–7)}, 7–6^{(7–4)}, 7–5
4.	2003	Ljubljana, Slovenia	Clay	(Hungary) Gergely Kisgyörgy	(Croatia) Ivan Cerović (Serbia) Aleksander Slovic	7–6^{(7–3)}, 6–3
5.	2003	Budaors, Hungary	Clay	(Hungary) Gergely Kisgyörgy	(Czech Republic) Tomáš Berdych (Czech Republic) Michal Navrátil	6–4, 4–6, 7–6^{(7–3)}
6.	2004	Turin, Italy	Clay	(Italy) Giorgio Galimberti	(Chile) Hermes Gamonal (Chile) Adrián García	6–1, 6–3
7.	2004	Cordenons, Italy	Clay	(Hungary) Kornél Bardóczky	(Italy) Andrea Merati (Belgium) Christophe Rochus	6–2, 6–0
8.	2004	Ischgl, Austria	Carpet	(Germany) Christopher Kas	(Italy) Gianluca Bazzica (Italy) Massimo Dell'Acqua	7–5, 6–3
9.	2005	Genoa, Italy	Clay	(Argentina) Sergio Roitman	(Italy) Marco Pedrini (Italy) Andrea Stoppini	6–1, 6–4
10.	2005	Budapest, Hungary	Clay	(Argentina) Sergio Roitman	(Germany) Philipp Petzschner (Germany) Lars Uebel	6–3, 5–7, 6–3
11.	2006	Chiasso, Switzerland	Clay	(Croatia) Lovro Zovko	(Israel) Amir Hadad (Croatia) Roko Karanušić	6–2, 7–5
12.	2006	Trani, Italy	Clay	(Italy) Daniele Giorgini	(Italy) Alessandro Motti (Spain) Daniel Muñoz de la Nava	6–4, 3–6, [10–6]
13.	2007	Trani, Italy	Clay	(Italy) Daniele Giorgini	(Italy) Fabio Colangelo (Italy) Alessandro Motti	6–2, 7–5
14.	2007	Vigo, Spain	Clay	(Algeria) Lamine Ouahab	(Spain) Pablo Santos (Netherlands) Igor Sijsling	2–6, 6–4, [10–7]
15.	2007	Alphen aan den Rijn, Netherlands	Clay	(Croatia) Lovro Zovko	(France) Jérémy Chardy (North Macedonia) Predrag Rusevski	6–3, 6–3
16.	2008	Rimini, Italy	Clay	(Italy) Marco Crugnola	(Romania) Cătălin-Ionuț Gârd (Netherlands) Matwé Middelkoop	6–1, 6–1
17.	2008	Napoli, Italy	Clay	(Italy) Alessandro Motti	(Bosnia and Herzegovina) Ismar Gorčić (Italy) Antonio Maiorano	6–7^{(5–7)}, 6–3, [10–7]
