= Massimo Dell'Acqua =

Italian tennis player

- Full name: Massimo Dell'Acqua
- Country (sports): Italy
- Born: 6 September 1979 (age 47) Como, Italy
- Plays: Right-handed
- Prize money: $190,825

Singles
- Career record: 1–5
- Career titles: 0
- Highest ranking: No. 148 (8 September 2003)

Doubles
- Career record: 0–1
- Career titles: 0
- Highest ranking: No. 188 (22 November 2004)

Massimo Dell'Acqua (born 6 September 1979) is a former professional tennis player from Italy.

== Biography ==
Dell'Acqua comes from Como and trained at the Centro Tecnico Nazionale before turning professional in 1999.

His first ATP Tour main draw appearance came at Copenhagen in 2003, when he lost to Marc Rosset in the first round. In 2004 he featured in tournaments in Dubai, Barcelona and most notably the Rome Masters. In Rome he lost a close match to world number 11 Nicolás Massú, which went for 3 hours and 20 minutes. It wasn't until s-Hertogenbosch in 2008 that he played again in an ATP Tour tournament. After getting through qualifying, Dell'Acqua beat Fabio Fognini in first round, then lost to David Ferrer.

During his career he took part in the qualifiers of all four Grand Slam tournaments.

At Challenger level he won the title at Bristol in 2003 and in the same year had a win over Andy Murray in Nottingham. At the 2004 Recanati Challenger he won the doubles title with Uros Vico and in the singles event defeated Jo-Wilfried Tsonga en route to the semi-finals. He also had Challenger wins over Félix Mantilla and Gilles Simon, both at the Prostějov Challenger in 2005.

== Challenger titles ==
=== Singles: (1) ===
No.	Year	Tournament	Surface	Opponent	Score
1.	2003	Bristol, Great Britain	Grass	(Germany) David Prinosil	6–4, 6–4

=== Doubles: (1) ===
No.	Year	Tournament	Surface	Partner	Opponents	Score
1.	2004	Recanati, Italy	Hard	(Italy) Uros Vico	(Italy) Daniele Giorgini (Italy) Federico Torresi	6–1, 6–4
