= 2004 Copa Petrobras Santiago – Doubles =

Tennis tournament

Doubles
- 2004 Copa Petrobras Santiago

Final
- Champions: (Italy) Enzo Artoni (Argentina) Ignacio González King
- Runners-up: (Argentina) Brian Dabul (Argentina) Damián Patriarca
- Score: 6–3, 6–0

Events
Singles	Doubles
← 2003 ·	Copa Petrobras Santiago	· 2005 →

Enzo Artoni and Ignacio González King defeated Brian Dabul and Damián Patriarca 6–3, 6–0 in the final.

== Seeds ==
1. (Brazil) André Sá / (Brazil) Flávio Saretta (first round)
2. (Argentina) Sebastián Prieto / (Spain) Fernando Vicente (semifinals)
3. (Argentina) Juan Pablo Brzezicki / (Spain) Óscar Hernández (semifinals)
4. (Italy) Enzo Artoni / (Argentina) Ignacio González King (champions)

== Draw ==
=== Key ===
- Q = Qualifier
- WC = Wild card
- LL = Lucky loser
- Alt = Alternate
- ITF = ITF entry
- PR = Protected ranking
- SR = Special ranking
- SE = Special exempt
- JE = Junior exempt
- JR = Junior Accelerator Programme entrant
- CO = College Accelerator Programme entrant
- NG = Next Gen Accelerator Program entrant
- w/o = Walkover
- r = Retired
- d = Defaulted

=== Draw ===
First round
1	(Brazil) A Sá (Brazil) F Saretta	4	5
(Romania) V Ioniță (Romania) G Moraru	6	7
(Argentina) B Dabul (Argentina) D Patriarca	6	6
WC	(Chile) P Harboe (Chile) F Parada	4	3
3	(Argentina) JP Brzezicki (Spain) Ó Hernández	6	6
WC	(Chile) Pedro Graber (Chile) H Podlipnik	0	2
WC	(Chile) J Aguilar (Chile) G Hormazábal	3	2
(Argentina) A Dellatorre (Austria) O Marach	6	6
(Chile) H Gamonal (Chile) A García	6	6
(Brazil) F Ferreiro (Argentina) JP Guzmán	4	2
(Czech Republic) J Pospíšil (Czech Republic) J Vaněk	2	6	4
4	(Italy) E Artoni (Argentina) I González King	6	3	6
(Argentina) C Berlocq (Argentina) C Villagrán	2	3
(Brazil) M Daniel (Argentina) M Puerta	6	6
(Chile) P Capdeville (Argentina) D Moyano	4	6	3
2	(Argentina) S Prieto (Spain) F Vicente	6	3	6

Quarterfinals
(Romania) V Ioniță (Romania) G Moraru	4	3
(Argentina) B Dabul (Argentina) D Patriarca	6	6
3	(Argentina) JP Brzezicki (Spain) Ó Hernández	6^{6}	6	6
(Argentina) A Dellatorre (Austria) O Marach	7^{8}	3	2
(Chile) H Gamonal (Chile) A García
4	(Italy) E Artoni (Argentina) I González King	w/o
(Brazil) M Daniel (Argentina) M Puerta	6	3	4
2	(Argentina) S Prieto (Spain) F Vicente	3	6	6

Semifinals
(Argentina) B Dabul (Argentina) D Patriarca	6	7^{7}
3	(Argentina) JP Brzezicki (Spain) Ó Hernández	4	6^{3}
4	(Italy) E Artoni (Argentina) I González King	6	7^{7}
2	(Argentina) S Prieto (Spain) F Vicente	4	6^{3}

Final
(Argentina) B Dabul (Argentina) D Patriarca	3	0
4	(Italy) E Artoni (Argentina) I González King	6	6
