= 2005 Copa Petrobras Santiago – Doubles =

Doubles
- 2005 Copa Petrobras Santiago

Final
- Champions: (Austria) Daniel Köllerer (Austria) Oliver Marach
- Runners-up: (Argentina) Lucas Arnold Ker (Ecuador) Giovanni Lapentti
- Score: 6–4, 6–3

Events
Singles	Doubles
← 2004 ·	Copa Petrobras Santiago	· 2006 →

Enzo Artoni and Ignacio González King were the defending champions, but did not compete this year.

Daniel Köllerer and Oliver Marach defeated Lucas Arnold Ker and Giovanni Lapentti 6–4, 6–3 in the final.

== Seeds ==
1. (Argentina) Lucas Arnold Ker / (Ecuador) Giovanni Lapentti (final)
2. (Spain) Rubén Ramírez Hidalgo / (Spain) Santiago Ventura (first round)
3. (Brazil) Marcelo Melo / (Argentina) Sergio Roitman (quarterfinals)
4. (Brazil) ~~Marcos Daniel~~ / (Spain) ~~Fernando Vicente~~ (withdrew due to a back injury for Daniel)

== Draw ==
=== Key ===
- Q = Qualifier
- WC = Wild card
- LL = Lucky loser
- Alt = Alternate
- ITF = ITF entry
- PR = Protected ranking
- SR = Special ranking
- SE = Special exempt
- JE = Junior exempt
- JR = Junior Accelerator Programme entrant
- CO = College Accelerator Programme entrant
- NG = Next Gen Accelerator Program entrant
- w/o = Walkover
- r = Retired
- d = Defaulted

=== Draw ===
First round
1	(Argentina) L Arnold Ker (Ecuador) G Lapentti	7^{7}	7^{10}
WC	(Brazil) T Bellucci (Brazil) A Ghem	6^{2}	6^{8}
(Chile) P Capdeville (Chile) A García	7^{11}	3	1^{r}
WC	(Chile) J Aguilar (Chile) F Parada	6^{9}	6	2
3	(Brazil) M Melo (Argentina) S Roitman	6	6
(Romania) G Moraru (Romania) A Ungur	0	3
WC	(Chile) H Gamonal (Serbia and Montenegro) D Vemić	6	6
(United States) H Armando (Argentina) C Villagrán	3	1
(Spain) Ó Hernández (Italy) F Luzzi	3	6	6
(Spain) D Gimeno-Traver (Costa Rica) JA Marín	6	4	3
(Argentina) D Hartfield (Brazil) J Silva	6	6
Alt	(Poland) F Urban (Italy) S Vagnozzi	2	1
(Argentina) JM del Potro (Mexico) S González	6	6^{3}	7
(Romania) A Cruciat (Serbia and Montenegro) B Pašanski	2	7^{7}	5
(Austria) D Köllerer (Austria) O Marach	6	6
2	(Spain) R Ramírez Hidalgo (Spain) S Ventura	1	4

Quarterfinals
1	(Argentina) L Arnold Ker (Ecuador) G Lapentti	7^{9}	6^{1}	6
WC	(Chile) J Aguilar (Chile) F Parada	6^{7}	7^{7}	4
3	(Brazil) M Melo (Argentina) S Roitman	3	6	6^{4}
WC	(Chile) H Gamonal (Serbia and Montenegro) D Vemić	6	4	7^{7}
(Spain) Ó Hernández (Italy) F Luzzi	6	6
(Argentina) D Hartfield (Brazil) J Silva	3	3
(Argentina) JM del Potro (Mexico) S González	6	5	6^{5}
(Austria) D Köllerer (Austria) O Marach	1	7	7^{7}

Semifinals
1	(Argentina) L Arnold Ker (Ecuador) G Lapentti	6	7
WC	(Chile) H Gamonal (Serbia and Montenegro) D Vemić	2	5
(Spain) Ó Hernández (Italy) F Luzzi	1	3
(Austria) D Köllerer (Austria) O Marach	6	6

Final
1	(Argentina) L Arnold Ker (Ecuador) G Lapentti	4	3
(Austria) D Köllerer (Austria) O Marach	6	6
