= 2004 Copa Petrobras Santiago =

- Date: 1–7 November
- Edition: 1st
- Category: ATP Challenger Series
- Draw: 32S / 16D
- Prize money: US$50,000
- Surface: Clay
- Location: Santiago, Chile

Champions

Singles
- (Spain) Óscar Hernández

Doubles
- (Italy) Enzo Artoni / (Argentina) Ignacio González King
Copa Petrobras Santiago	· 2005 →

The 2004 Copa Petrobras Santiago was a professional tennis tournament played on outdoor red clay courts. It was part of the 2004 ATP Challenger Series. It took place in Santiago, Chile between 1 and 7 November 2004.

== ATP entrants ==
=== Seeds ===
Country	Player	Rank^{1}	Seed
ESP	Óscar Hernández	98	1
BRA	Flávio Saretta	111	2
CHI	Adrián García	112	3
CZE	Jiří Vaněk	132	4
ARG	Edgardo Massa	143	5
ARG	Franco Squillari	144	6
BRA	André Sá	159	7
ECU	Nicolás Lapentti	169	8

- Rankings are as of October 25, 2004.

=== Other entrants ===
The following players received wildcards into the singles main draw:

- (Brazil) Diego Cubas
- (Chile) Guillermo Hormazábal
- (Argentina) Emiliano Massa
- (Chile) Julio Peralta

The following players received entry from the qualifying draw:

- (Argentina) Francisco Cabello
- (Argentina) Diego Moyano
- (Austria) Marko Neunteibl
- (Spain) Fernando Vicente

== Champions ==
=== Singles ===
(Spain) Óscar Hernández def. (Ecuador) Nicolás Lapentti, 7–6^{(7–4)}, 6–4

=== Doubles ===
(Italy) Enzo Artoni / (Argentina) Ignacio González King def. (Argentina) Brian Dabul / (Argentina) Damián Patriarca, 6–3, 6–0
