= 2004 Copa Petrobras Santiago – Singles =

Singles
- 2004 Copa Petrobras Santiago

Final
- Champion: (Spain) Óscar Hernández
- Runner-up: (Ecuador) Nicolás Lapentti
- Score: 7–6^{(7–4)}, 6–4

Events
Singles	Doubles
Copa Petrobras Santiago	· 2005 →

Óscar Hernández defeated Nicolás Lapentti 7–6^{(7–4)}, 6–4 in the final.

== Seeds ==
1. (Spain) Óscar Hernández (champion)
2. (Brazil) Flávio Saretta (second round)
3. (Chile) Adrián García (first round)
4. (Czech Republic) Jiří Vaněk (second round)
5. (Argentina) Edgardo Massa (second round)
6. (Argentina) Franco Squillari (second round, retired due to a back injury)
7. (Brazil) André Sá (first round)
8. (Ecuador) Nicolás Lapentti (final)

== Draw ==
=== Key ===
- Q = Qualifier
- WC = Wild card
- LL = Lucky loser
- Alt = Alternate
- ITF = ITF entry
- PR = Protected ranking
- SR = Special ranking
- SE = Special exempt
- JE = Junior exempt
- JR = Junior Accelerator Programme entrant
- CO = College Accelerator Programme entrant
- NG = Next Gen Accelerator Program entrant
- w/o = Walkover
- r = Retired
- d = Defaulted

=== Finals ===
Semifinals
1	(Spain) Óscar Hernández	6	6
(Argentina) Juan Pablo Guzmán	4	4
(Argentina) Juan Pablo Brzezicki	7^{7}	2	0^{r}
8	(Ecuador) Nicolás Lapentti	6^{1}	6	1

Final
1	(Spain) Óscar Hernández	7^{7}	6
8	(Ecuador) Nicolás Lapentti	6^{4}	4

=== Top half ===
First round
1	(Spain) Ó Hernández	7	6
WC	(Brazil) D Cubas	5	2
(Czech Republic) J Pospíšil	6	3	2
Q	(Spain) F Vicente	3	6	6
(Argentina) B Dabul	6	6
WC	(Argentina) Em Massa	4	2
Q	(Austria) Marko Neunteibl	6	1	7^{7}
7	(Brazil) A Sá	3	6	6^{2}
3	(Chile) A García	6	3	3
(Romania) G Moraru	2	6	6
(Brazil) J Silva	3	7^{7}	6
(Argentina) M Puerta	6	6^{5}	2
Q	(Argentina) Francisco Cabello	2	3
(Argentina) JP Guzmán	6	6
(Brazil) M Daniel	3	6	3
5	(Argentina) Ed Massa	6	3	6

Second round
1	(Spain) Ó Hernández	3	6	6
Q	(Spain) F Vicente	6	3	0
(Argentina) B Dabul	6	7^{7}
Q	(Austria) Marko Neunteibl	1	6^{3}
(Romania) G Moraru	1	3
(Brazil) J Silva	6	6
(Argentina) JP Guzmán	3	7	6
5	(Argentina) Ed Massa	6	5	3

Quarterfinals
1	(Spain) Ó Hernández	6	7^{7}
(Argentina) B Dabul	4	6^{3}
(Brazil) J Silva	4	6	3
(Argentina) JP Guzmán	6	4	6

Semifinals
1	(Spain) Ó Hernández	6	6
(Argentina) JP Guzmán	4	4

=== Bottom half ===
First round
6	(Argentina) F Squillari	6	6
(Argentina) C Berlocq	2	1
WC	(Chile) G Hormazábal	4	6	3
WC	(Chile) J Peralta	6	2	6
(Romania) V Ioniță	6	1	2
(Argentina) JP Brzezicki	3	6	6
(Argentina) I González King	2	2
4	(Czech Republic) J Vaněk	6	6
8	(Ecuador) N Lapentti	2	7	6
(Austria) O Marach	6	5	1
Q	(Argentina) D Moyano	6	2	1
(Austria) J Ager	4	6	6
(Argentina) C Villagrán	6	1	6
(Brazil) F Ferreiro	2	6	4
(Chile) H Gamonal	4	2
2	(Brazil) F Saretta	6	6

Second round
6	(Argentina) F Squillari	1	0^{r}
WC	(Chile) J Peralta	6	1
(Argentina) JP Brzezicki	6^{5}	7^{7}	6
4	(Czech Republic) J Vaněk	7^{7}	6^{1}	0
8	(Ecuador) N Lapentti	6	6
(Austria) J Ager	3	4
(Argentina) C Villagrán	6	6
2	(Brazil) F Saretta	4	4

Quarterfinals
WC	(Chile) J Peralta	4	1
(Argentina) JP Brzezicki	6	6
8	(Ecuador) N Lapentti	6	6^{5}	6
(Argentina) C Villagrán	2	7^{7}	2

Semifinals
(Argentina) JP Brzezicki	7^{7}	2	0^{r}
8	(Ecuador) N Lapentti	6^{1}	6	1

- Draw source
