= 2005 Copa Petrobras Santiago – Singles =

Singles
- 2005 Copa Petrobras Santiago

Final
- Champion: (Brazil) Júlio Silva
- Runner-up: (Spain) Rubén Ramírez Hidalgo
- Score: 6–2, 6–3

Events
| Singles | Doubles |
| ← 2004 · | Copa Petrobras Santiago | · 2006 → |

Óscar Hernández was the defending champion, but lost in semifinals to Rubén Ramírez Hidalgo.

Júlio Silva defeated Rubén Ramírez Hidalgo 6–2, 6–3 in the final.

== Seeds ==
1. (Spain) Fernando Vicente (second round)
2. (Spain) Óscar Hernández (semifinals)
3. (Argentina) ~~Carlos Berlocq~~ (withdrew due to a right shoulder injury)
4. (Brazil) Flávio Saretta (first round)
5. (Serbia and Montenegro) Boris Pašanski (quarterfinals)
6. (Austria) Oliver Marach (second round)
7. (Costa Rica) Juan Antonio Marín (quarterfinals)
8. (Spain) Rubén Ramírez Hidalgo (final)

== Draw ==
=== Key ===
- Q = Qualifier
- WC = Wild card
- LL = Lucky loser
- Alt = Alternate
- ITF = ITF entry
- PR = Protected ranking
- SR = Special ranking
- SE = Special exempt
- JE = Junior exempt
- JR = Junior Accelerator Programme entrant
- CO = College Accelerator Programme entrant
- NG = Next Gen Accelerator Program entrant
- w/o = Walkover
- r = Retired
- d = Defaulted

=== Finals ===
Semifinals
(Brazil) Júlio Silva | 6 | 6
Q | (Argentina) Máximo González | 2 | 1
8 | (Spain) Rubén Ramírez Hidalgo | 6 | 6
2 | (Spain) Óscar Hernández | 3 | 3

Final
(Brazil) Júlio Silva | 6 | 6
8 | (Spain) Rubén Ramírez Hidalgo | 2 | 3

=== Top half ===
First round
1 | (Spain) F Vicente | 6 | 7^{7}
WC | (Chile) F Parada | 2 | 6^{5}
(Brazil) J Silva | 3 | 6 | 7^{7}
(Ecuador) G Lapentti | 6 | 3 | 6^{5}
(Italy) F Luzzi | 6 | 6
Q | (Romania) G Moraru | 3 | 3
(Spain) S Ventura | 4 | 4
5 | (Serbia and Montenegro) B Pašanski | 6 | 6
Q | (Italy) F Fognini | 6 | 6
WC | (Chile) J Aguilar | 3 | 4
Q | (Argentina) M González | 7 | 6
(United States) H Armando | 5 | 3
(Argentina) D Hartfield | 6 | 6
LL | (Romania) A Cruciat | 3 | 3
LL | (Brazil) A Simoni | 4 | 6^{4}
6 | (Austria) O Marach | 6 | 7^{7}

Second round
1 | (Spain) F Vicente | 4 | 7 | 1
(Brazil) J Silva | 6 | 5 | 6
(Italy) F Luzzi | 2 | 6 | 3
5 | (Serbia and Montenegro) B Pašanski | 6 | 3 | 6
Q | (Italy) F Fognini | 5 | 6 | 2
Q | (Argentina) M González | 7 | 2 | 6
(Argentina) D Hartfield | 6 | 4 | 6
6 | (Austria) O Marach | 2 | 6 | 4

Quarterfinals
(Brazil) J Silva | 6 | 6
5 | (Serbia and Montenegro) B Pašanski | 3 | 4
Q | (Argentina) M González | 3 | 6 | 6
(Argentina) D Hartfield | 6 | 4 | 3

Semifinals
(Brazil) J Silva | 6 | 6
Q | (Argentina) M González | 2 | 1

=== Bottom half ===
First round
8 | (Spain) R Ramírez Hidalgo | 6 | 5 | 6
(Argentina) JM del Potro | 2 | 7 | 1
WC | (Brazil) M Melo | 2 | 4
(Argentina) S Roitman | 6 | 6
(Brazil) T Alves | 6 | 6
(Mexico) S González | 1 | 4
(Spain) D Gimeno Traver | 7 | 6
4 | (Brazil) F Saretta | 5 | 2
7 | (Costa Rica) JA Marín | 5 | 6 | 6
Q | (Argentina) JM Aranguren | 7 | 3 | 0
(Serbia and Montenegro) D Vemić | 6 | 6
(Chile) A García | 1 | 2
(Chile) P Capdeville | 4 | 4
WC | (Brazil) B Rosa | 6 | 6
(Austria) D Köllerer | 4 | 3
2 | (Spain) Ó Hernández | 6 | 6

Second round
8 | (Spain) R Ramírez Hidalgo | 6 | 7
(Argentina) S Roitman | 0 | 5
(Brazil) T Alves | 3 | 2
(Spain) D Gimeno Traver | 6 | 6
7 | (Costa Rica) JA Marín | 6 | 6
(Serbia and Montenegro) D Vemić | 4 | 4
WC | (Brazil) B Rosa | 6 | 2 | 2
2 | (Spain) Ó Hernández | 3 | 6 | 6

Quarterfinals
8 | (Spain) R Ramírez Hidalgo | 6^{3} | 6 | 6
(Spain) D Gimeno Traver | 7^{7} | 3 | 4
7 | (Costa Rica) JA Marín | 3 | 6 | 3
2 | (Spain) Ó Hernández | 6 | 4 | 6

Semifinals
8 | (Spain) R Ramírez Hidalgo | 6 | 6
2 | (Spain) Ó Hernández | 3 | 3

=== External links ===
- Main Draw
- Qualifying Draw
