= 2005 Copa Petrobras Santiago =

- Date: 24–30 October
- Edition: 2nd
- Category: ATP Challenger Series
- Draw: 32S / 16D
- Prize money: US$50,000
- Surface: Clay
- Location: Santiago, Chile

Champions

Singles
- (Brazil) Júlio Silva

Doubles
- (Austria) Daniel Köllerer / (Austria) Oliver Marach
← 2004 ·	Copa Petrobras Santiago	· 2009 →

The 2005 Copa Petrobras Santiago was a professional tennis tournament played on outdoor red clay courts. It was part of the 2005 ATP Challenger Series. It took place in Santiago, Chile between 24 and 30 October 2005.

== ATP entrants ==
=== Seeds ===
Country	Player	Rank^{1}	Seed
ESP	Fernando Vicente	96	1
ESP	Óscar Hernández	100	2
~~ARG~~	~~Carlos Berlocq~~	~~108~~	~~3~~
BRA	Flávio Saretta	115	4
SCG	Boris Pašanski	118	5
AUT	Oliver Marach	123	6
CRC	Juan Antonio Marín	125	7
ESP	Rubén Ramírez Hidalgo	129	8

- Rankings are as of October 17, 2005.

=== Other entrants ===
The following players received wildcards into the singles main draw:

- (Chile) Jorge Aguilar
- (Brazil) Marcelo Melo
- (Chile) Felipe Parada
- (Brazil) Bruno Rosa

The following players received entry from the qualifying draw:

- (Argentina) Juan-Martín Aranguren
- (Italy) Fabio Fognini
- (Argentina) Máximo González
- (Romania) Gabriel Moraru

The following players received entry as lucky losers:

- (Romania) Adrian Cruciat
- (Brazil) Alexandre Simoni

=== Withdrawals ===
Before the tournament

- (Argentina) Carlos Berlocq (right shoulder injury) → replaced by (Romania) Adrian Cruciat
- (Brazil) Marcos Daniel (back injury) → replaced by (Brazil) Alexandre Simoni

== Champions ==
=== Singles ===
(Brazil) Júlio Silva def. (Spain) Rubén Ramírez Hidalgo, 6–2, 6–3

=== Doubles ===
(Austria) Daniel Köllerer / (Austria) Oliver Marach def. (Argentina) Lucas Arnold Ker / (Ecuador) Giovanni Lapentti, 6–4, 6–3
