= 2010 Copa Petrobras Santiago – Doubles =

Doubles
- 2010 Copa Petrobras Santiago

Final
- Champions: (Spain) Daniel Muñoz-de la Nava (Spain) Rubén Ramírez Hidalgo
- Runners-up: (Serbia) Nikola Ćirić (Montenegro) Goran Tošić
- Score: 6–4, 6–2

Events
Singles	Doubles
← 2009 ·	Copa Petrobras Santiago	· 2011 →

Diego Cristín and Eduardo Schwank were the defending champions, but Schwank decided not to participate this year.
As a result, Cristín partnered with Diego Junqueira, however they were eliminated by Franco Ferreiro and André Sá in the first round.
Second seeds Daniel Muñoz-de la Nava and Rubén Ramírez Hidalgo won in the final 6–4, 6–2, against Nikola Ćirić and Goran Tošić.

== Seeds ==
1. (Brazil) Franco Ferreiro / (Brazil) André Sá (quarterfinals)
2. (Spain) Daniel Muñoz-de la Nava / (Spain) Rubén Ramírez Hidalgo (champions)
3. (Australia) Kaden Hensel / (Australia) Adam Hubble (semifinals)
4. (Argentina) ~~Juan Pablo Brzezicki~~ / (Portugal) ~~Leonardo Tavares~~ (withdrew)

== Draw ==
=== Key ===
- Q = Qualifier
- WC = Wild card
- LL = Lucky loser
- Alt = Alternate
- SE = Special exempt
- PR = Protected ranking
- ITF = ITF entry
- JE = Junior exempt
- w/o = Walkover
- r = Retired
- d = Defaulted
- SR = Special ranking

=== Draw ===
First round
1	(Brazil) F Ferreiro (Brazil) A Sá	6	6
WC	(Argentina) D Cristín (Argentina) D Junqueira	4	1
(Brazil) R Dutra da Silva (Brazil) J Souza	1	6	[10]
(Brazil) T Alves (Brazil) J Silva	6	2	[7]
ALT	(Serbia) N Ćirić (Montenegro) G Tošić	6	6
WC	(Chile) F Fritz (Chile) G Lama	4	1
(Italy) F Fognini (Italy) P Lorenzi	3	2
(Kazakhstan) Y Schukin (Croatia) A Veić	6	6
(France) O Patience (France) É Prodon	2	3
(Brazil) M Daniel (Portugal) R Machado	6	6
(Chile) J Aguilar (Argentina) F del Bonis	6	3	[4]
3	(Australia) K Hensel (Australia) A Hubble	2	6	[10]
(Spain) G Alcaide (Spain) P Riba	6	6
WC	(Chile) P Capdeville (Chile) H Podlipnik-Castillo	3	3
(Brazil) R Hocevar (Spain) A Ramos-Viñolas	4	6^{4}
2	(Spain) D Muñoz-de la Nava (Spain) R Ramírez Hidalgo	6	7

Quarterfinals
1	(Brazil) F Ferreiro (Brazil) A Sá	4	5
(Brazil) R Dutra da Silva (Brazil) J Souza	6	7
ALT	(Serbia) N Ćirić (Montenegro) G Tošić	6	5	[10]
(Kazakhstan) Y Schukin (Croatia) A Veić	4	7	[7]
(Brazil) M Daniel (Portugal) R Machado	4	3
3	(Australia) K Hensel (Australia) A Hubble	6	6
(Spain) G Alcaide (Spain) P Riba	w/o
2	(Spain) D Muñoz-de la Nava (Spain) R Ramírez Hidalgo

Semifinals
(Brazil) R Dutra da Silva (Brazil) J Souza	6	3	[9]
ALT	(Serbia) N Ćirić (Montenegro) G Tošić	2	6	[11]
3	(Australia) K Hensel (Australia) A Hubble	3	6	[7]
2	(Spain) D Muñoz-de la Nava (Spain) R Ramírez Hidalgo	6	3	[10]

Final
ALT	(Serbia) N Ćirić (Montenegro) G Tošić	4	2
2	(Spain) D Muñoz-de la Nava (Spain) R Ramírez Hidalgo	6	6
