= 2009 Copa Petrobras Santiago – Singles =

Singles
- 2009 Copa Petrobras Santiago

Final
- Champion: (Argentina) Eduardo Schwank
- Runner-up: (Chile) Nicolás Massú
- Score: 6–2, 6–2

Events
Singles	Doubles
← 2008 ·	Copa Petrobras Santiago	· 2010 →

Eduardo Schwank defeated Nicolás Massú 6–2, 6–2 in the final.

== Seeds ==
1. (Argentina) Juan Ignacio Chela (semifinals)
2. (Chile) Paul Capdeville (first round)
3. (Spain) Santiago Ventura (first round)
4. (Chile) Nicolás Massú (final)
5. (Spain) Rubén Ramírez Hidalgo (quarterfinals)
6. (Ecuador) Nicolás Lapentti (quarterfinals)
7. (Argentina) Sergio Roitman (second round)
8. (Argentina) Sebastián Decoud (first round)

== Draw ==
=== Key ===
- Q = Qualifier
- WC = Wild card
- LL = Lucky loser
- Alt = Alternate
- SE = Special exempt
- PR = Protected ranking
- ITF = ITF entry
- JE = Junior exempt
- w/o = Walkover
- r = Retired
- d = Defaulted
- SR = Special ranking

=== Finals ===
Semifinals
1	(Argentina) Juan Ignacio Chela	2	4
4	(Chile) Nicolás Massú	6	6
(Argentina) Eduardo Schwank	6	6
(Spain) Daniel Muñoz de la Nava	2	3

Final
4	(Chile) Nicolás Massú	2	2
(Argentina) Eduardo Schwank	6	6

=== Top half ===
First round
1	(Argentina) JI Chela	6	6
(Brazil) J Silva	3	3
WC	(Argentina) M Zabaleta	3	1
(Spain) P Andújar	6	6
(Canada) P Polansky	6	6
(Argentina) D Álvarez	1	4
(Argentina) D Cristín	2	2
7	(Argentina) S Roitman	6	6
4	(Chile) N Massú	7	4	6
(Argentina) L Migani	5	6	3
WC	(Brazil) F Romboli	7	6
Q	(Argentina) M Trungelliti	6^{4}	0
(Paraguay) R Delgado	1	1
(Chile) J Aguilar	6	6
Q	(Chile) A García	3	5
5	(Spain) R Ramírez Hidalgo	6	7

Second round
(Argentina) JI Chela	6	6
(Spain) P Andújar	2	2
(Canada) P Polansky	0	6	7
7	(Argentina) S Roitman	6	1	5
4	(Chile) N Massú	6	6
WC	(Brazil) F Romboli	3	1
(Chile) J Aguilar	6^{7}	5
5	(Spain) R Ramírez Hidalgo	7	7

Quarterfinals
1	(Argentina) JI Chela	6	6
(Canada) P Polansky	3	3
4	(Chile) N Massú	7	6
5	(Spain) R Ramírez Hidalgo	6^{1}	1

Semifinals
1	(Argentina) JI Chela	2	4
4	(Chile) N Massú	6	6

=== Bottom half ===
First round
8	(Argentina) S Decoud	4	3
WC	(Chile) C Saavedra-Corvalán	6	6
(Argentina) F del Bonis	6	6
(Argentina) J Brzezicki	3	2
(Argentina) E Schwank	6	6
Q	(Argentina) M Puerta	1	4
(Spain) D Marrero	1
3	(Spain) S Ventura	0	r
6	(Ecuador) N Lapentti	6	4	6
(Serbia) F Krajinović	3	6	3
WC	(Chile) G Hormazábal	6	6
(United States) A Bogomolov Jr.	2	4
(Spain) D Muñoz de la Nava	6	6
(Brazil) J Souza	2	4
(Brazil) R Hocevar	4	7	6
2	(Chile) P Capdeville	6	6^{4}	3

Second round
WC	(Chile) C Saavedra-Corvalán	0	4
(Argentina) F del Bonis	6	6
(Argentina) E Schwank	6	6
(Spain) D Marrero	3	4
6	(Ecuador) N Lapentti	6	7
WC	(Chile) G Hormazábal	1	6^{5}
(Spain) D Muñoz de la Nava	2	6	7
(Brazil) R Hocevar	6	2	6^{2}

Quarterfinals
(Argentina) F del Bonis	0	3
(Argentina) E Schwank	6	6
6	(Ecuador) N Lapentti	6	4	4
(Spain) D Muñoz de la Nava	4	6	6

Semifinals
(Argentina) E Schwank	6	6
(Spain) D Muñoz de la Nava	2	3
