= 2009 Copa Petrobras Santiago – Doubles =

Doubles
- 2009 Copa Petrobras Santiago

Final
- Champions: (Argentina) Diego Cristín (Argentina) Eduardo Schwank
- Runners-up: (Argentina) Juan Pablo Brzezicki (Spain) David Marrero
- Score: 6–4, 7–5

Events
| Singles | Doubles |
- Copa Petrobras Santiago

Diego Cristín and Eduardo Schwank won in the final 6–4, 7–5, against Juan Pablo Brzezicki and David Marrero.

== Seeds ==
The top seed received a bye to the first round.

1. (Spain) Rubén Ramírez Hidalgo / (Spain) Santiago Ventura (semifinals)
2. (Argentina) Juan Pablo Brzezicki / (Spain) David Marrero (final)
3. (Spain) Daniel Muñoz-de la Nava / (Argentina) Sergio Roitman (first round)
4. (Argentina) Diego Álvarez / (Argentina) Sebastián Decoud (semifinals)

== Draw ==
Key

- Q = Qualifier
- WC = Wild card
- LL = Lucky loser
- Alt = Alternate
- ITF = ITF entry
- PR = Protected ranking
- SR = Special ranking
- SE = Special exempt
- JE = Junior exempt
- JR = Junior Accelerator Programme entrant
- CO = College Accelerator Programme entrant
- NG = Next Gen Accelerator Program entrant
- w/o = Walkover
- r = Retired
- d = Defaulted

=== Draw ===
First round
(Spain) P Andújar (Argentina) F del Bonis | 6 | 6
(Chile) J Aguilar (Chile) G Hormazábal | 2 | 1
3 | (Spain) D Muñoz-de la Nava (Argentina) S Roitman | 6^{8} | 2
(Brazil) F Romboli (Brazil) J Silva | 7 | 6
(Chile) A García (Chile) H Podlipnik | 2 | 2
(Argentina) D Cristín (Argentina) E Schwank | 6 | 6
(United States) A Bogomolov Jr. (Canada) P Polansky | 6 | 7
(Brazil) R Hocevar (Brazil) J Souza | 3 | 6^{1}
(Chile) P Capdeville (Spain) JA Viloca-Puig | 6^{4} | 6 | [8]
4 | (Argentina) D Álvarez (Argentina) S Decoud | 7 | 4 | [10]
(Argentina) G Durán (Argentina) M Trungelliti | 3 | 4
(Argentina) S Prieto (Argentina) M Puerta | 6 | 6
(Argentina) L Migani (Chile) C Saavedra-Corvalán | 3 | 6^{6}
2 | (Argentina) JP Brzezicki (Spain) D Marrero | 6 | 7

Quarterfinals
1 | (Spain) R Ramírez Hidalgo (Spain) S Ventura | 6 | 7
(Spain) P Andújar (Argentina) F del Bonis | 4 | 6^{5}
(Brazil) F Romboli (Brazil) J Silva | 4 | 6^{1}
(Argentina) D Cristín (Argentina) E Schwank | 6 | 7
(United States) A Bogomolov Jr. (Canada) P Polansky | w/o
4 | (Argentina) D Álvarez (Argentina) S Decoud
(Argentina) S Prieto (Argentina) M Puerta | 4 | 4
2 | (Argentina) JP Brzezicki (Spain) D Marrero | 6 | 6

Semifinals
1 | (Spain) R Ramírez Hidalgo (Spain) S Ventura | 3 | 4
(Argentina) D Cristín (Argentina) E Schwank | 6 | 6
4 | (Argentina) D Álvarez (Argentina) S Decoud | 2 | 2
2 | (Argentina) JP Brzezicki (Spain) D Marrero | 6 | 6

Finals
(Argentina) D Cristín (Argentina) E Schwank | 6 | 7
2 | (Argentina) JP Brzezicki (Spain) D Marrero | 4 | 5
