= 2010 Copa Petrobras Santiago – Singles =

Singles
- 2010 Copa Petrobras Santiago

Final
- Champion: (Italy) Fabio Fognini
- Runner-up: (Chile) Paul Capdeville
- Score: 6–2, 7–6(2)

Events
Singles	Doubles
← 2009 ·	Copa Petrobras Santiago	· 2011 →

Eduardo Schwank was the defending champion but decided not to participate.
Fabio Fognini defeated Paul Capdeville 6–2, 7–6(2) in the final.

== Seeds ==
1. (Italy) Fabio Fognini (champion)
2. (Spain) Pere Riba (first round)
3. (Spain) Rubén Ramírez Hidalgo (second round)
4. (Brazil) João Souza (quarterfinals)
5. (Spain) Albert Ramos Viñolas (second round)
6. (Portugal) Rui Machado (semifinals)
7. (Kazakhstan) Yuri Schukin (first round)
8. (Chile) Nicolás Massú (first round, retired)

== Draw ==
=== Key ===
- Q = Qualifier
- WC = Wild card
- LL = Lucky loser
- Alt = Alternate
- SE = Special exempt
- PR = Protected ranking
- ITF = ITF entry
- JE = Junior exempt
- w/o = Walkover
- r = Retired
- d = Defaulted
- SR = Special ranking

=== Finals ===
Semifinals
1	(Italy) Fabio Fognini	6	6
6	(Portugal) Rui Machado	4	1
WC	(Chile) Paul Capdeville	3
(France) Guillaume Rufin	0^{r}

Final
1	(Italy) Fabio Fognini	6	7
WC	(Chile) Paul Capdeville	2	6^{2}

=== Top half ===
First round
1	(Italy) F Fognini	6	6
LL	(Portugal) L Tavares	4	0
(France) É Prodon	7	7
Q	(Montenegro) G Tošić	6^{3}	6^{2}
ALT	(Brazil) J Silva	7	3	7
Q	(Argentina) JP Brzezicki	5	6	6^{5}
(Brazil) M Daniel	6^{4}	3
5	(Spain) A Ramos Viñolas	7	6
4	(Brazil) J Souza	6	3	6
Q	(France) A Michon	4	6	2
(Italy) P Lorenzi	3	6	6
(Spain) D Muñoz de la Nava	6	2	4
(France) O Patience	6	4	6
(Argentina) D Junqueira	4	6	3
(Brazil) T Alves	6	6^{3}	3
6	(Portugal) R Machado	2	7	6

Second round
1	(Italy) F Fognini	7	7
(France) É Prodon	6^{4}	5
ALT	(Brazil) J Silva	6	7
5	(Spain) A Ramos Viñolas	3	5
4	(Brazil) J Souza	6	6
(Italy) P Lorenzi	4	4
(France) O Patience	4	4
6	(Portugal) R Machado	6	6

Quarterfinals
1	(Italy) F Fognini	7	6
ALT	(Brazil) J Silva	5	2
4	(Brazil) J Souza	5	3
6	(Portugal) R Machado	7	6

Semifinals
1	(Italy) F Fognini	6	6
6	(Portugal) R Machado	4	1

=== Bottom half ===
First round
7	(Kazakhstan) Y Schukin	4	6^{4}
(Chile) J Aguilar	6	7
(Croatia) A Veić	6	6
WC	(Chile) G Lama	1	0
WC	(Chile) P Capdeville	6	1	6
(Argentina) F Delbonis	4	6	3
WC	(Argentina) M Vassallo Argüello	6	3	6^{6}
3	(Spain) R Ramírez Hidalgo	2	6	7
8	(Chile) N Massú	6	3	0^{r}
(France) G Rufin	4	6	1
(Paraguay) R Delgado	6	6^{0}	0^{r}
Q	(France) M Teixeira	4	7	1
SE	(Serbia) N Ćirić	6	6
WC	(Brazil) R Hocevar	3	4
(Spain) G Alcaide	6	6
2	(Spain) P Riba	4	4

Second round
(Chile) J Aguilar	6	6
(Croatia) A Veić	4	4
WC	(Chile) P Capdeville	6	6
3	(Spain) R Ramírez Hidalgo	4	2
(France) G Rufin	6	6
Q	(France) M Teixeira	3	3
SE	(Serbia) N Ćirić	3
(Spain) G Alcaide	4^{r}

Quarterfinals
(Chile) J Aguilar	1	2
WC	(Chile) P Capdeville	6	6
(France) G Rufin	7	6
SE	(Serbia) N Ćirić	5	3

Semifinals
WC	(Chile) P Capdeville	3
(France) G Rufin	0^{r}
