= 2010 Copa Petrobras Santiago =

- Date: 18–24 October
- Edition: 4th
- Category: ATP Challenger Tour
- Draw: 32S / 16D
- Prize money: US$100,000
- Surface: Clay
- Location: Santiago, Chile

Champions

Singles
- (Italy) Fabio Fognini

Doubles
- (Spain) Daniel Muñoz de la Nava / (Spain) Rubén Ramírez Hidalgo
← 2009 ·	Copa Petrobras Santiago

The 2010 Copa Petrobras Santiago was a professional tennis tournament played on hard courts. It was the fourth edition of the tournament which was part of the 2010 ATP Challenger Tour. It took place in Santiago, Chile between 18 and 24 October 2010.

== Singles main-draw entrants ==
=== Seeds ===
Country	Player	Rank^{1}	Seed
ITA	Fabio Fognini	63	1
ESP	Pere Riba	80	2
ESP	Rubén Ramírez Hidalgo	87	3
BRA	João Souza	105	4
ESP	Albert Ramos Viñolas	121	5
POR	Rui Machado	122	6
KAZ	Yuri Schukin	123	7
CHI	Nicolás Massú	128	8

- Rankings are as of October 11, 2010.

=== Other entrants ===
The following players received wildcards into the singles main draw:

- (Chile) Paul Capdeville
- (Brazil) Ricardo Hocevar
- (Chile) Gonzalo Lama
- (Argentina) Martín Vassallo Argüello

The following players received a special entrant into the singles main draw:

- (Serbia) Nikola Ćirić

The following players received an alternate into the singles main draw:

- (Brazil) Júlio Silva

The following players received entry from the qualifying draw:

- (Argentina) Juan Pablo Brzezicki
- (Portugal) Leonardo Tavares (LL)
- (France) Axel Michon
- (France) Maxime Teixeira
- (Montenegro) Goran Tošić

== Champions ==
=== Singles ===
(Italy) Fabio Fognini def. (Chile) Paul Capdeville, 6–2, 7–6(2)

=== Doubles ===
(Spain) Daniel Muñoz de la Nava / (Spain) Rubén Ramírez Hidalgo def. (Serbia) Nikola Ćirić / (Montenegro) Goran Tošić, 6–4, 6–2
