= 2003 US Open – Men's singles qualifying =

Men's singles qualifying
- 2003 US Open

Events
Singles	men	women		boys	girls
Doubles	men	women	mixed	boys	girls
WC Singles	men	women	quad
WC Doubles	men	women	quad
Legends	men	women	mixed

Qualification
Singles	men	women
- US Open

This article displays the qualifying draw for men's singles at the 2003 US Open.

== Seeds ==
1. (South Africa) Wesley Moodie (qualified)
2. (Sweden) Robin Söderling (qualified)
3. (Argentina) Federico Browne (first round)
4. (France) Nicolas Thomann (first round)
5. (Croatia) Ivo Karlović (qualified)
6. (Belgium) Dick Norman (first round)
7. (France) Nicolas Mahut (qualified)
8. (France) Thierry Ascione (first round)
9. (Czech Republic) Tomáš Berdych (qualifying competition, lucky loser)
10. (Spain) Fernando Verdasco (qualifying competition, lucky loser)
11. (Germany) Alexander Waske (second round)
12. (Netherlands) Dennis van Scheppingen (second round)
13. (Italy) Giorgio Galimberti (qualified)
14. (Switzerland) Marc Rosset (first round)
15. (United States) Cecil Mamiit (first round)
16. (Switzerland) Ivo Heuberger (first round)
17. (United States) Jeff Salzenstein (qualified)
18. (United States) Eric Taino (first round)
19. (Serbia and Montenegro) Janko Tipsarević (qualified)
20. (Australia) Todd Larkham (first round)
21. (Ecuador) Giovanni Lapentti (second round)
22. (France) Julien Varlet (first round)
23. (Czech Republic) Jiří Vaněk (first round)
24. (Italy) Stefano Pescosolido (qualifying competition)
25. (Russia) Igor Kunitsyn (second round)
26. (Sweden) Thomas Enqvist (qualified)
27. (Belgium) Gilles Elseneer (first round)
28. (United States) Paul Goldstein (second round)
29. (Paraguay) Ramón Delgado (qualified)
30. (Australia) Peter Luczak (second round)
31. (Chile) Hermes Gamonal (second round)
32. (Czech Republic) Jan Vacek (qualified)

== Qualifiers ==
1. (South Africa) Wesley Moodie
2. (Sweden) Robin Söderling
3. (Germany) Maximilian Abel
4. (France) Julien Benneteau
5. (Croatia) Ivo Karlović
6. (Serbia and Montenegro) Janko Tipsarević
7. (France) Nicolas Mahut
8. (Czech Republic) Jan Vacek
9. (Croatia) Roko Karanušić
10. (United States) Jeff Salzenstein
11. (Sweden) Thomas Enqvist
12. (Russia) Dmitry Tursunov
13. (Italy) Giorgio Galimberti
14. (Germany) Philipp Kohlschreiber
15. (Sweden) Joachim Johansson
16. (Paraguay) Ramón Delgado

== Lucky losers ==
1. (Czech Republic) Tomáš Berdych
2. (Spain) Fernando Verdasco

== Draw ==
=== First qualifier ===
First round
1	(South Africa) Wesley Moodie	6	6^{4}	6
(Czech Republic) František Čermák	3	7^{7}	1
(Austria) Markus Hipfl	1	6	1
(Czech Republic) Jan Hájek	6	3	6
WC	(United States) Todd Widom	3	6^{4}
(United States) Zack Fleishman	6	7^{7}
(South Africa) Louis Vosloo	6^{2}	1
30	(Australia) Peter Luczak	7^{7}	6

Second round
1	(South Africa) Wesley Moodie	6^{10}	7^{8}	7^{7}
(Czech Republic) Jan Hájek	7^{12}	6^{6}	6^{4}
(United States) Zack Fleishman	6	6
30	(Australia) Peter Luczak	0	3

Qualifying competition
1	(South Africa) Wesley Moodie	6	7
(United States) Zack Fleishman	3	5

=== Second qualifier ===
First round
2	(Sweden) Robin Söderling	6	6
(Australia) Alun Jones	4	2
(Argentina) Juan Pablo Brzezicki	6	6
(France) Rodolphe Cadart	2	3
(Austria) Daniel Köllerer	6	4	4
(Italy) Stefano Galvani	3	6	6
(France) Slimane Saoudi	3	3
21	(Ecuador) Giovanni Lapentti	6	6

Second round
2	(Sweden) Robin Söderling	6	6
(Argentina) Juan Pablo Brzezicki	2	3
(Italy) Stefano Galvani	6	6
21	(Ecuador) Giovanni Lapentti	2	3

Qualifying competition
2	(Sweden) Robin Söderling	6	6
(Italy) Stefano Galvani	1	3

=== Third qualifier ===
First round
3	(Argentina) Federico Browne	6	3	1
(Netherlands Antilles) Jean-Julien Rojer	3	6	6
(Argentina) Ignacio González King	2	3
(Germany) Maximilian Abel	6	6
(Italy) Andreas Seppi	2	3
(France) Michaël Llodra	6	6
(Argentina) Sergio Roitman	3	6	6
20	(Australia) Todd Larkham	6	1	1

Second round
(Netherlands Antilles) Jean-Julien Rojer	6	4	2
(Germany) Maximilian Abel	3	6	6
(France) Michaël Llodra	6	3	6
(Argentina) Sergio Roitman	4	6	3

Qualifying competition
(Germany) Maximilian Abel	7^{7}	7^{7}
(France) Michaël Llodra	6^{4}	6^{5}

=== Fourth qualifier ===
First round
4	(France) Nicolas Thomann	6^{4}	4
(Australia) Paul Baccanello	7^{7}	6
(Serbia and Montenegro) Dušan Vemić	3	4
(France) Julien Benneteau	6	6
(Argentina) Mariano Delfino	6^{5}	3
(Austria) Oliver Marach	7^{7}	6
(Argentina) Sebastián Prieto	2	6	4
24	(Italy) Stefano Pescosolido	6	4	6

Second round
(Australia) Paul Baccanello	2	4
(France) Julien Benneteau	6	6
(Austria) Oliver Marach	3	4
24	(Italy) Stefano Pescosolido	6	6

Qualifying competition
(France) Julien Benneteau	6	7^{8}
24	(Italy) Stefano Pescosolido	4	6^{6}

=== Fifth qualifier ===
First round
5	(Croatia) Ivo Karlović	7	6
(Japan) Takahiro Terachi	5	2
(France) Jean-François Bachelot	6	5	6^{5}
(Slovakia) Michal Mertiňák	4	7	7^{7}
(Israel) Dudi Sela	6	6
(Japan) Tasuku Iwami	4	0
WC	(United States) Thomas Blake	3	1
28	(United States) Paul Goldstein	6	6

Second round
5	(Croatia) Ivo Karlović	3	7^{7}	6
(Slovakia) Michal Mertiňák	6	6^{5}	4
(Israel) Dudi Sela	7	6
28	(United States) Paul Goldstein	5	4

Qualifying competition
5	(Croatia) Ivo Karlović	6	6
(Israel) Dudi Sela	0	2

=== Sixth qualifier ===
First round
6	(Belgium) Dick Norman	6^{3}	3
(United Kingdom) Arvind Parmar	7^{7}	6
(Sweden) Björn Rehnquist	1	6	6^{5}
(United States) Jack Brasington	6	3	7^{7}
(Uzbekistan) Vadim Kutsenko	2	3
WC	(United States) Matias Boeker	6	6
(Cyprus) Marcos Baghdatis	6^{1}	7	6^{5}
19	(Serbia and Montenegro) Janko Tipsarević	7^{7}	5	7^{7}

Second round
(United Kingdom) Arvind Parmar	6	6^{1}	6
(United States) Jack Brasington	4	7^{7}	3
WC	(United States) Matias Boeker	4	2
19	(Serbia and Montenegro) Janko Tipsarević	6	6

Qualifying competition
(United Kingdom) Arvind Parmar	5	7	1
19	(Serbia and Montenegro) Janko Tipsarević	7	5	6

=== Seventh qualifier ===
First round
7	(France) Nicolas Mahut	6	7^{7}
(Australia) Joseph Sirianni	4	6^{4}
WC	(United States) K. J. Hippensteel	1	2
(Israel) Amir Hadad	6	6
(Italy) Potito Starace	6	7^{7}
(Brazil) Marcos Daniel	4	6^{3}
(Croatia) Lovro Zovko	1	6^{9}
25	(Russia) Igor Kunitsyn	6	7^{11}

Second round
7	(France) Nicolas Mahut	7^{7}	4	7^{7}
(Israel) Amir Hadad	6^{3}	6	6^{1}
(Italy) Potito Starace	6	6^{5}	6
25	(Russia) Igor Kunitsyn	4	7^{7}	1

Qualifying competition
7	(France) Nicolas Mahut	6	6^{6}	7^{7}
(Italy) Potito Starace	2	7^{8}	6^{5}

=== Eighth qualifier ===
First round
8	(France) Thierry Ascione	6^{5}	2
(Canada) Frank Dancevic	7^{7}	6
(Italy) Vincenzo Santopadre	6	6
WC	(United States) Kean Feeder	2	4
(Argentina) Andrés Dellatorre	0	3
WC	(United States) Rajeev Ram	6	6
(Czech Republic) Petr Luxa	4	2
32	(Czech Republic) Jan Vacek	6	6

Second round
(Canada) Frank Dancevic	6^{2}	6^{2}
(Italy) Vincenzo Santopadre	7^{7}	7^{7}
WC	(United States) Rajeev Ram	4	1
32	(Czech Republic) Jan Vacek	6	6

Qualifying competition
(Italy) Vincenzo Santopadre	3	6	4
32	(Czech Republic) Jan Vacek	6	1	6

=== Ninth qualifier ===
First round
9	(Czech Republic) Tomáš Berdych	6	6
WC	(United States) Chris Kwon	2	4
(Finland) Tuomas Ketola	6	3	6
(Czech Republic) Jan Hernych	4	6	3
WC	(United States) Bobby Reynolds	5	5
(Czech Republic) Tomáš Zíb	7	7
(Croatia) Roko Karanušić	7^{7}	1	7
23	(Czech Republic) Jiří Vaněk	6^{4}	6	5

Second round
9	(Czech Republic) Tomáš Berdych	6	6^{5}	7^{7}
(Finland) Tuomas Ketola	4	7^{7}	6^{3}
(Czech Republic) Tomáš Zíb	3	6	3
(Croatia) Roko Karanušić	6	4	6

Qualifying competition
9	(Czech Republic) Tomáš Berdych	6	2	3
(Croatia) Roko Karanušić	3	6	6

=== Tenth qualifier ===
First round
10	(Spain) Fernando Verdasco	6	6
(Brazil) André Sá	4	4
(Germany) Marcello Craca	3	6	2
(Brazil) Alexandre Simoni	6	3	6
(Chinese Taipei) Lu Yen-hsun	7	6^{4}	6^{5}
(Switzerland) George Bastl	5	7^{7}	7^{7}
(Canada) Frédéric Niemeyer	6	1	3
17	(United States) Jeff Salzenstein	2	6	6

Second round
10	(Spain) Fernando Verdasco	6	6
(Brazil) Alexandre Simoni	1	0
(Switzerland) George Bastl	1	4
17	(United States) Jeff Salzenstein	6	6

Qualifying competition
10	(Spain) Fernando Verdasco	1	4
17	(United States) Jeff Salzenstein	6	6

=== Eleventh qualifier ===
First round
11	(Germany) Alexander Waske	6	6
(Australia) Andrew Ilie	2	4
(Argentina) Ignacio Hirigoyen	6	4	3
(Germany) Michael Kohlmann	4	6	6
(Israel) Noam Okun	3	6	6
(Argentina) Gastón Etlis	6	3	2
(Czech Republic) Pavel Šnobel	4	5
26	(Sweden) Thomas Enqvist	6	7

Second round
11	(Germany) Alexander Waske	3	6	1
(Germany) Michael Kohlmann	6	3	6
(Israel) Noam Okun	1	4
26	(Sweden) Thomas Enqvist	6	6

Qualifying competition
(Germany) Michael Kohlmann	4	2
26	(Sweden) Thomas Enqvist	6	6

=== Twelfth qualifier ===
First round
12	(Netherlands) Dennis van Scheppingen	7^{7}	6
(Japan) Satoshi Iwabuchi	6^{4}	2
(Russia) Dmitry Tursunov	6	6
(Germany) David Prinosil	4	2
(Italy) Daniele Bracciali	7	6
(Luxembourg) Gilles Müller	5	4
(United Kingdom) Martin Lee	6	6
22	(France) Julien Varlet	2	3

Second round
12	(Netherlands) Dennis van Scheppingen	1	3
(Russia) Dmitry Tursunov	6	6
(Italy) Daniele Bracciali	3	7	7
(United Kingdom) Martin Lee	6	5	5

Qualifying competition
(Russia) Dmitry Tursunov	6	6
(Italy) Daniele Bracciali	4	4

=== Thirteenth qualifier ===
First round
13	(Italy) Giorgio Galimberti	5	7^{7}	6
(Israel) Andy Ram	7	6^{3}	3
(Italy) Massimo Dell'Acqua	6	6
(Czech Republic) Petr Kralert	4	2
(Czech Republic) Michal Tabara	6	5	1
(Norway) Jan Frode Andersen	4	7	6
(France) Florent Serra	6	7
18	(United States) Eric Taino	3	5

Second round
13	(Italy) Giorgio Galimberti	7^{7}	3	7
(Italy) Massimo Dell'Acqua	6^{2}	6	5
(Norway) Jan Frode Andersen	3	7	6^{4}
(France) Florent Serra	6	5	7^{7}

Qualifying competition
13	(Italy) Giorgio Galimberti	6^{3}	6	6
(France) Florent Serra	7^{7}	3	0

=== Fourteenth qualifier ===
First round
14	(Switzerland) Marc Rosset	6	1	2
(United States) Kevin Kim	3	6	6
(Italy) Cristiano Caratti	2	6	2
(Republic of Ireland) Peter Clarke	6	4	6
(Germany) Philipp Kohlschreiber	6	6
(Italy) Leonardo Azzaro	4	2
(Israel) Harel Levy	6^{6}	4
31	(Chile) Hermes Gamonal	7^{8}	6

Second round
(United States) Kevin Kim	4	3
(Republic of Ireland) Peter Clarke	6	6
(Germany) Philipp Kohlschreiber	6	6
31	(Chile) Hermes Gamonal	4	2

Qualifying competition
(Republic of Ireland) Peter Clarke	7^{7}	3	6^{5}
(Germany) Philipp Kohlschreiber	6^{5}	6	7^{7}

=== Fifteenth qualifier ===
First round
15	(United States) Cecil Mamiit	1	3
(Sweden) Joachim Johansson	6	6
(Thailand) Danai Udomchoke	6	6
(Japan) Gouichi Motomura	3	4
(Czech Republic) Robin Vik	6	6
(Switzerland) Yves Allegro	3	2
(Brazil) Ricardo Mello	3	6	7^{8}
27	(Belgium) Gilles Elseneer	6	4	6^{6}

Second round
(Sweden) Joachim Johansson	6	7^{7}
(Thailand) Danai Udomchoke	4	6^{5}
(Czech Republic) Robin Vik	5	6	3
(Brazil) Ricardo Mello	7	3	6

Qualifying competition
(Sweden) Joachim Johansson	4	6	6
(Brazil) Ricardo Mello	6	1	2

=== Sixteenth qualifier ===
First round
16	(Switzerland) Ivo Heuberger	6	3	4
(Austria) Julian Knowle	1	6	6
(Japan) Takao Suzuki	6	0	6
(United States) Michael Joyce	4	6	2
(Germany) Björn Phau	3	6	6
(Netherlands) Fred Hemmes Jr.	6	3	4
WC	(United States) Jamil Al-Agba	0	3
29	(Paraguay) Ramón Delgado	6	6

Second round
(Austria) Julian Knowle	3	4
(Japan) Takao Suzuki	6	6
(Germany) Björn Phau	5	3
29	(Paraguay) Ramón Delgado	7	6

Qualifying competition
(Japan) Takao Suzuki	6^{1}	6^{1}
29	(Paraguay) Ramón Delgado	7^{7}	7^{7}
