= Memorial Argo Manfredini =

ATP Challenger Tour
- Location: Sassuolo, Italy
- Category: ATP Challenger Series
- Surface: Clay / Outdoors
- Draw: 32S/32Q/16D
- Prize money: €30,000
- Website: Official website

The Memorial Argo Manfredini is a tennis tournament held in Sassuolo, Italy since 2000. The event is part of the challenger series and is played on outdoor clay courts.

== Past finals ==
=== Singles ===
Year	Champion	Runner-up	Score
2000	(Italy) Stefano Tarallo	(Spain) Álex Calatrava	7–6, 3–6, 7-6
2001	(Hungary) Attila Sávolt	(Italy) Giorgio Galimberti	6–4, 7-5
2002	(Spain) David Ferrer	(Argentina) Mariano Puerta	6–4, 6-1
2003	(Spain) Mariano Albert-Ferrando	(Italy) Renzo Furlan	7–6, 6-3
2004	(Italy) Potito Starace	(Italy) Alessio di Mauro	6–2, 6-3
2005	(Austria) Oliver Marach	(Chile) Paul Capdeville	6–3, 4–6, 6-4
2006	(Portugal) Frederico Gil	(Spain) Gorka Fraile	6–3, 7-5
2007	(Ukraine) Oleksandr Dolgopolov Jr.	(Spain) Héctor Ruiz-Cadenas	6–1, 6-4
2008	(Portugal) Frederico Gil	(Spain) Santiago Ventura	6–2, 6-3

=== Doubles ===
Year	Champion	Runner-up	Score
2000	(Spain) Álex Calatrava (Spain) Salvador Navarro-Gutierrez	(Italy) Daniele Bracciali (Italy) Federico Luzzi	6–7, 6–1, 6-4
2001	(Spain) Didac Pérez (Spain) Gabriel Trujillo-Soler	(Italy) Manuel Jorquera (Italy) Tomas Tenconi	6–3, 6-2
2002	(Italy) Leonardo Azzaro (Italy) Potito Starace	(Italy) Manuel Jorquera (Argentina) Diego Moyano	6–3, 6-2
2003	(Australia) Paul Baccanello (Italy) Stefano Galvani	(Italy) Enzo Artoni (Argentina) Martín Vassallo Argüello	7–5, 2–6, 7-5
2004	(Italy) Enzo Artoni (Argentina) Ignacio González King	(Italy) Gianluca Bazzica (Chile) Paul Capdeville	3–6, 6–4, 6-1
2005	(Argentina) Juan Pablo Brzezicki (Argentina) Cristian Villagrán	(Chile) Paul Capdeville (Italy) Simone Vagnozzi	7–6, 6-2
2006	(Italy) Francesco Aldi (Italy) Tomas Tenconi	(Spain) Pablo Andújar (Italy) Leonardo Azzaro	6–0, 6-1
2007	(Italy) Giorgio Galimberti (Brazil) Márcio Torres	(Italy) Daniele Giorgini (Italy) Andrea Stoppini	6–3, 6–7, [10-6]
2008	(Argentina) Juan-Martín Aranguren (Italy) Stefano Galvani	(Spain) Rubén Ramírez Hidalgo (Spain) José Antonio Sánchez-de Luna	5–7, 6–2, [10-8]
