= Enzo Artoni =

Italian tennis player

- Country (sports): Italy
- Born: 27 January 1976 (age 49); Buenos Aires, Argentina
- Plays: Right-handed
- Prize money: $174,943

Singles
- Career record: 0–0
- Career titles: 0; 0 Challenger, 0 Futures
- Highest ranking: No. 372 (19 April 1999)

Grand Slam singles results
- Wimbledon: Q1 (1999)

Doubles
- Career record: 25–33
- Career titles: 2; 14 Challenger, 11 Futures
- Highest ranking: No. 69 (31 October 2005)

Grand Slam doubles results
- Australian Open: 2R (2002)
- French Open: 1R (2003, 2005)
- Wimbledon: 1R (2005)
- US Open: 1R (2005)
- Last updated on: 20 June 2021.

Enzo Artoni (born 27 January 1976), is a professional tennis player who represented Italy.

During his career Artoni won 2 doubles titles. He enjoyed most of his pro tour tennis success while playing doubles. He achieved a career-high doubles ranking of world No. 69 in 2005.

== ATP career finals ==
=== Doubles: 3 (2 titles, 1 runner-up) ===
Legend (doubles) Grand Slam (0–0) ATP World Tour Finals (0–0) ATP Masters Series (0–0) ATP Championship Series (0–0) ATP International Series (2–1)	Finals by surface Hard (1–0) Clay (1–1) Grass (0–0) Carpet (0–0)	Finals by setting Outdoor (2–1) Indoor (0–0)

Result	W–L	Date	Tournament	Tier	Surface	Partner	Opponents	Score
Win	1–0	Sep 2001	Salvador, Brazil	International Series	Hard	(Brazil) Daniel Melo	(Argentina) Gastón Etlis (South Africa) Brent Haygarth	3–6, 6–1, 7–6^{(7–5)}
Loss	1–1	Sep 2001	Palermo, Italy	International Series	Clay	(Spain) Emilio Benfele Álvarez	(Spain) Tomás Carbonell (Argentina) Daniel Orsanic	2–6, 6–2, 2–6
Win	2–1	May 2004	Casablanca, Morocco	International Series	Clay	(Spain) Fernando Vicente	(Switzerland) Yves Allegro (Germany) Michael Kohlmann	3–6, 6–0, 6–4

== ATP Challenger and ITF Futures finals ==
=== Singles: 2 (0–2) ===
Legend ATP Challenger (0–0) ITF Futures (0–2)	Finals by surface Hard (0–0) Clay (0–2) Grass (0–0) Carpet (0–0)

Result	W–L	Date	Tournament	Tier	Surface	Opponent	Score
Loss	0–1	Nov 1998	Paraguay F1, Asunción	Futures	Clay	(Argentina) Juan Ignacio Chela	4–6, 2–6
Loss	0–2	Dec 1998	Chile F3, Santiago	Futures	Clay	(Chile) Fernando González	1–6, 2–6

=== Doubles: 36 (25–11) ===
Legend ATP Challenger (14–7) ITF Futures (11–4)	Finals by surface Hard (0–1) Clay (25–10) Grass (0–0) Carpet (0–0)

Result	W–L	Date	Tournament	Tier	Surface	Partner	Opponents	Score
Win	1–0	Jul 1998	Germany F12, Kassel	Futures	Clay	(Argentina) Federico Browne	(Peru) Alejandro Aramburú Acuña (Argentina) Gastón Gaudio	6–3, 6–3
Win	2–0	Aug 1998	Italy F14, Pavia	Futures	Clay	(Italy) Silvio Scaiola	(Italy) Stefano Tarallo (Italy) Massimo Boscatto	6–2, 6–2
Win	3–0	Nov 1998	Argentina F5, Buenos Aires	Futures	Clay	(Argentina) Miguel Pastura	(United States) Hugo Armando (Argentina) Pablo Bianchi	6–4, 6–0
Loss	3–1	Nov 1998	Chile F2, Viña del Mar	Futures	Hard	(Argentina) Diego Moyano	(Chile) Sergio Cortés (Chile) Francisco Ruiz	4–6, 6–2, 6–7
Win	4–1	Dec 1998	Santiago, Chile	Challenger	Clay	(Argentina) Federico Browne	(Chile) Hermes Gamonal (Brazil) Ricardo Schlachter	6–2, 6–4
Win	5–1	May 1999	Italy F8, Forlì	Futures	Clay	(Germany) Sebastian Weisz	(Italy) Dario Berrettini (Italy) Stefano Tarallo	6–0, 5–7, 6–2
Win	6–1	Sep 1999	Peru F3, Lima	Futures	Clay	(Argentina) Sergio Roitman	(Peru) Iván Miranda (Peru) Américo Venero	6–4, 6–2
Win	7–1	Oct 1999	Paraguay F3, Asunción	Futures	Clay	(Argentina) Sergio Roitman	(Argentina) Daniel Caracciolo (Argentina) Leonardo Olguín	6–4, 6–4
Loss	7–2	Nov 1999	Argentina F4, Rosario	Futures	Clay	(Argentina) Andrés Schneiter	(Argentina) Guillermo Coria (Argentina) David Nalbandian	1–6, 7–6, 4–6
Loss	7–3	Nov 1999	Argentina F5, Lanús	Futures	Clay	(Argentina) Andrés Schneiter	(Brazil) Marcos Daniel (Brazil) Ricardo Schlachter	6–7, 7–6, 3–6
Win	8–3	Nov 1999	Chile F4, Santiago	Futures	Clay	(Argentina) Andrés Schneiter	(Chile) Hermes Gamonal (Brazil) Leandro Rosa	7–6, 6–4
Win	9–3	Mar 2000	Argentina F1, Mendoza	Futures	Clay	(Argentina) Andrés Schneiter	(Argentina) José Acasuso (Argentina) Leonardo Olguín	6–1, 6–3
Loss	9–4	Apr 2000	Chile F4, Santiago	Futures	Clay	(Argentina) Francisco Cabello	(Brazil) Adriano Ferreira (Brazil) Flávio Saretta	5–7, 6–7^{(5–7)}
Win	10–4	Jun 2000	Germany F5, Oberweier	Futures	Clay	(Argentina) Francisco Cabello	(Belgium) Olivier Rochus (Belgium) Réginald Willems	6–3, 6–3
Win	11–4	Sep 2000	Skopje, Macedonia	Challenger	Clay	(Argentina) Sergio Roitman	(Australia) Dejan Petrovic (Argentina) Sebastián Prieto	7–5, 5–7, 6–3
Win	12–4	Apr 2001	Brazil F1, Rio de Janeiro	Futures	Clay	(Argentina) Juan Pablo Guzmán	(Argentina) Gustavo Marcaccio (Argentina) Patricio Rudi	4–6, 6–2, 6–1
Win	13–4	May 2001	Zagreb, Croatia	Challenger	Clay	(Argentina) Andrés Schneiter	(North Macedonia) Aleksandar Kitinov (Brazil) Alexandre Simoni	6–7^{(5–7)}, 6–4, 6–4
Win	14–4	Jun 2001	Biella, Italy	Challenger	Clay	(Argentina) Andrés Schneiter	(Italy) Massimo Bertolini (Italy) Cristian Brandi	7–6^{(7–5)}, 4–6, 6–1
Win	15–4	Oct 2001	Lima, Peru	Challenger	Clay	(Brazil) Daniel Melo	(Argentina) José Acasuso (Argentina) Martín Vassallo Argüello	6–2, 1–6, 7–6^{(9–7)}
Loss	15–5	Jun 2003	Sassuolo, Italy	Challenger	Clay	(Argentina) Martín Vassallo Argüello	(Italy) Stefano Galvani (Australia) Paul Baccanello	5–7, 6–2, 5–7
Win	16–5	Jul 2003	Mantova, Italy	Challenger	Clay	(Argentina) Martín Vassallo Argüello	(Italy) Elia Grossi (Italy) Stefano Tarallo	6–2, 6–3
Win	17–5	Aug 2003	Argentina F2, Buenos Aires	Futures	Clay	(Argentina) Gustavo Marcaccio	(Argentina) Juan-Martín Aranguren (Argentina) Matias De Genaro	4–6, 6–2, 6–3
Loss	17–6	Oct 2003	Seville, Spain	Challenger	Clay	(Argentina) Sergio Roitman	(Spain) Óscar Hernández (Spain) Albert Portas	4–6, 6–4, 4–6
Loss	17–7	Oct 2003	Barcelona, Spain	Challenger	Clay	(Argentina) Sergio Roitman	(Spain) Juan Ignacio Carrasco (Argentina) Mariano Delfino	5–7, 3–6
Win	18–7	Jun 2004	Sassuolo, Italy	Challenger	Clay	(Argentina) Ignacio González King	(Chile) Paul Capdeville (Italy) Gianluca Bazzica	3–6, 6–4, 6–1
Loss	18–8	Jun 2004	Lugano, Switzerland	Challenger	Clay	(Argentina) Ignacio González King	(Spain) Emilio Benfele Álvarez (Italy) Giorgio Galimberti	4–6, 3–6
Loss	18–9	Jul 2004	Scheveningen, Netherlands	Challenger	Clay	(Argentina) Juan Pablo Brzezicki	(Netherlands) Paul Logtens (Netherlands) Raemon Sluiter	2–6, 5–7
Win	19–9	Nov 2004	Santiago, Chile	Challenger	Clay	(Argentina) Ignacio González King	(Argentina) Brian Dabul (Argentina) Damián Patriarca	6–3, 6–0
Win	20–9	Nov 2004	Buenos Aires, Argentina	Challenger	Clay	(Argentina) Ignacio González King	(Romania) Gabriel Moraru (Romania) Victor Ioniță	7–5, 6–3
Win	21–9	Nov 2004	Santa Cruz, Bolivia	Challenger	Clay	(Argentina) Ignacio González King	(Romania) Gabriel Moraru (Romania) Victor Ioniță	6–3, 6–1
Win	22–9	Dec 2004	Aracaju, Brazil	Challenger	Clay	(Argentina) Ignacio González King	(Spain) Santiago Ventura (Argentina) Juan Pablo Guzmán	6–4, 6–2
Win	23–9	Jan 2005	La Serena, Chile	Challenger	Clay	(Paraguay) Ramón Delgado	(Brazil) Marcos Daniel (Germany) Tomas Behrend	7–6^{(7–2)}, 6–4
Loss	23–10	Jan 2005	Santiago, Chile	Challenger	Clay	(Argentina) Ignacio González King	(Ecuador) Giovanni Lapentti (Argentina) Damián Patriarca	2–6, 6–4, 4–6
Loss	23–11	May 2005	Zagreb, Croatia	Challenger	Clay	(Argentina) Martín Vassallo Argüello	(Belgium) Tom Vanhoudt (Romania) Gabriel Trifu	2–6, 6–4, 5–7
Win	24–11	Jun 2005	Lugano, Switzerland	Challenger	Clay	(Argentina) Juan Pablo Brzezicki	(Poland) Mariusz Fyrstenberg (Sweden) Robert Lindstedt	4–6, 6–2, 6–2
Win	25–11	Jun 2005	Braunschweig, Germany	Challenger	Clay	(Spain) Álex López Morón	(Belgium) Tom Vanhoudt (Italy) Massimo Bertolini	5–7, 6–4, 7–6^{(14–12)}
