= Oberweis, Germany =

Oberweis
- Municipality
- Coat of arms

- Location of Oberweis within Eifelkreis Bitburg-Prüm district
- Interactive map of Oberweis
- Location within Germany Location within Rhineland-Palatinate
- Coordinates: 49°57′42″N 6°25′25″E
- Country: Germany
- State: Rhineland-Palatinate
- District: Eifelkreis Bitburg-Prüm
- Municipal assoc.: Bitburger Land

Government
  - Mayor (2019–24): Klaus Manns

Area
  - Total: 9.74 km^{2} (3.76 sq mi)
- Elevation: 250 m (820 ft)

Population (2025-12-31)
  - Total: 574
  - Density: 58.9/km^{2} (153/sq mi)
- Time zone: UTC+01:00 (CET)
  - Summer (DST): UTC+02:00 (CEST)
- Postal codes: 54636
- Dialling codes: 06527
- Vehicle registration: BIT
- Website: www.oberweis.de

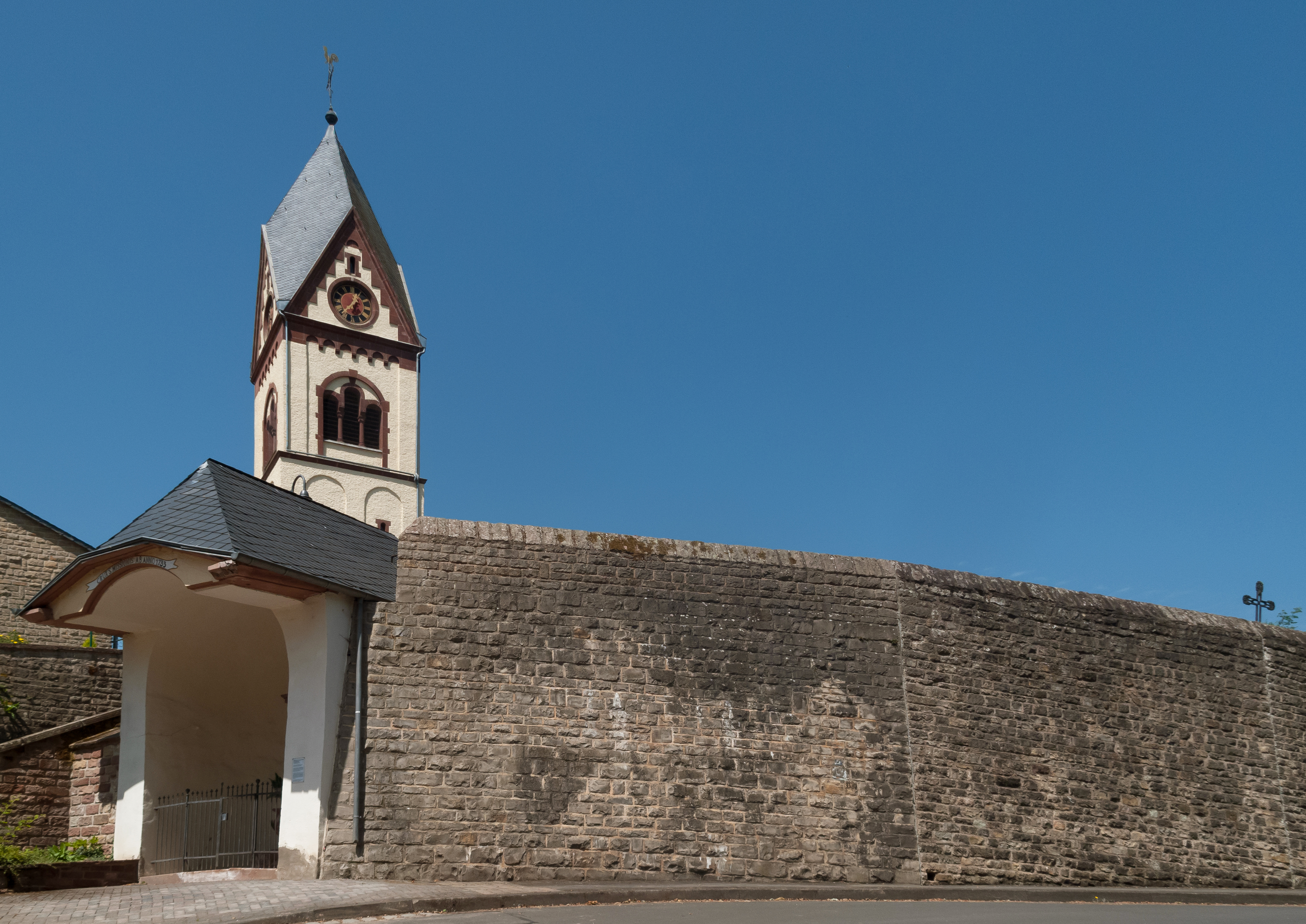
Oberweis, churchtower of the Catholic parish church Sankt Remigius

Oberweis is a municipality in the district of Bitburg-Prüm, in Rhineland-Palatinate, western Germany.
