= Diego Moyano =

Argentine tennis player and coach

- Country (sports): Argentina
- Born: 14 March 1975 (age 50) Buenos Aires, Argentina
- Height: 1.80 m (5 ft 11 in)
- Turned pro: 1997
- Plays: Right-handed (one-handed backhand)
- Prize money: $213,394

Singles
- Career record: 0–3
- Career titles: 0
- Highest ranking: No. 130 (20 November 2000)

Grand Slam singles results
- Australian Open: Q3 (2003, 2004)
- French Open: 1R (1999)
- Wimbledon: Q1 (2000, 2004)

Doubles
- Career record: 0–1
- Career titles: 0
- Highest ranking: No. 158 (14 June 2004)
- Last updated on: 5 December 2022.

Diego Moyano (born 14 March 1975) is a coach and former professional tennis player from Argentina.

== Coaching ==
Moyano has worked as a USTA coach, training American ATP players Tommy Paul, Reilly Opelka and Frances Tiafoe, as well as helping Denis Kudla and Andrea Collarini.

He formerly coached WTA tennis pro Coco Gauff until April 2023 and subsequently reunited with Frances Tiafoe in December 2023. Prior to that he coached Kevin Anderson from 2020 until his retirement in May 2022 and is currently coaching him since his comeback a year later in 2023.

== Professional career ==
Moyano took part in the 1999 French Open and lost a four set opening round match to American player Chris Woodruff.

His next appearance on the ATP Tour was in the 2001 Cerveza Club Colombia Open, where he was unable to get past qualifier Alexandre Simoni in the first round. He was also an opening round casualty at his next ATP tournament, the 2004 Buenos Aires Open, losing to Óscar Hernández.

The Argentine played in the doubles at the 2003 BellSouth Open, with Phillip Harboe. They lost in the first round to José Acasuso and Andrés Schneiter.

== ATP Challenger and ITF Futures finals ==
=== Singles: 27 (10–17) ===
Legend ATP Challenger (4–4) ITF Futures (6–13)	Finals by surface Hard (0–0) Clay (10–17) Grass (0–0) Carpet (0–0)

Result	W–L	Date	Tournament	Tier	Surface	Opponent	Score
Loss	0–1	Nov 1997	Buenos Aires, Argentina	Challenger	Clay	(Argentina) Franco Squillari	1–6, 4–6
Loss	0–2	May 1998	Germany F8, Schwaigern	Futures	Clay	(France) Olivier Malcor	1–6, 6–4, 4–6
Loss	0–3	Sep 1998	Belgrade, Serbia	Challenger	Clay	(Czech Republic) Jiří Vaněk	3–6, 3–6
Loss	0–4	Apr 1999	Argentina F1, Córdoba	Futures	Clay	(Argentina) Damián Furmanski	2–6, 3–6
Loss	0–5	May 1999	Argentina F2, Córdoba	Futures	Clay	(Argentina) Marcelo Charpentier	6–0, 4–6, 2–6
Loss	0–6	Jun 1999	Germany F5, Augsburg	Futures	Clay	(Netherlands) Martin Verkerk	3–6, 4–6
Loss	0–7	Jun 1999	Germany F6, Trier	Futures	Clay	(Netherlands) Martin Verkerk	2–6, 0–6
Win	1–7	Oct 1999	Paraguay F2, Asunción	Futures	Clay	(Chile) Adrián García	6–3, 6–4
Win	2–7	Nov 1999	Chile F4, Santiago	Futures	Clay	(Argentina) Matias O'Neille	6–4, 6–2
Loss	2–8	Nov 1999	Chile F5, Valparaíso	Futures	Clay	(Italy) Filippo Messori	5–7, 4–6
Loss	2–9	Mar 2000	Chile F3, Santiago	Futures	Clay	(Brazil) Alexandre Simoni	6–4, 6–7^{(2–7)}, 0–6
Win	3–9	Mar 2000	Argentina F1, Mendoza	Futures	Clay	(Brazil) Flávio Saretta	6–4, 6–0
Loss	3–10	Apr 2000	Argentina F3, Santa Fe	Futures	Clay	(Argentina) Guillermo Coria	6–7^{(0–7)}, 4–6
Win	4–10	Sep 2000	Budapest, Hungary	Challenger	Clay	(Greece) Vasilis Mazarakis	6–3, 6–0
Win	5–10	Nov 2000	Santiago, Chile	Challenger	Clay	(Argentina) Sebastián Prieto	6–3, 6–2
Win	6–10	Aug 2001	Argentina F7, Buenos Aires	Futures	Clay	(Argentina) Martín Vassallo Argüello	6–4, 7–5
Loss	6–11	Sep 2001	Campinas, Brazil	Challenger	Clay	(Argentina) Juan Ignacio Chela	3–6, 3–6
Loss	6–12	Apr 2002	Algeria F1, Algiers	Futures	Clay	(Czech Republic) František Čermák	3–6, 6–3, 2–6
Loss	6–13	May 2002	Algeria F2, Algiers	Futures	Clay	(Czech Republic) František Čermák	1–6, 6–7^{(3–7)}
Win	7–13	May 2002	Italy F2, Pavia	Futures	Clay	(Argentina) Marcelo Charpentier	6–0, 6–3
Win	8–13	Jul 2002	Budaors, Hungary	Challenger	Clay	(Czech Republic) Jiří Vaněk	4–6, 6–3, 6–4
Win	9–13	Jun 2003	Lugano, Switzerland	Challenger	Clay	(Spain) Álex Calatrava	6–4, 1–6, 7–6^{(7–4)}
Win	10–13	Nov 2003	Argentina F6, Buenos Aires	Futures	Clay	(Argentina) Juan Mónaco	7–5, 7–6^{(7–3)}
Loss	10–14	Apr 2004	Italy F4, Monza	Futures	Clay	(Argentina) Andres Dellatorre	2–6, 5–7
Loss	10–15	Sep 2004	Argentina F6, Buenos Aires	Futures	Clay	(Argentina) Brian Dabul	6–7^{(1–7)}, 1–6
Loss	10–16	Oct 2004	Chile F2, Santiago	Futures	Clay	(Argentina) Mariano Puerta	1–6, 1–6
Loss	10–17	Nov 2004	Buenos Aires, Argentina	Challenger	Clay	(Austria) Oliver Marach	2–6, 3–6

=== Doubles: 9 (3–6) ===
Legend ATP Challenger (1–5) ITF Futures (2–1)	Finals by surface Hard (0–0) Clay (3–6) Grass (0–0) Carpet (0–0)

Result	W–L	Date	Tournament	Tier	Surface	Partner	Opponents	Score
Loss	0–1	Nov 1998	Chile F2, Viña del Mar	Futures	Clay	(Italy) Enzo Artoni	(Chile) Sergio Cortés (Chile) Francisco Ruiz	4–6, 6–2, 6–7
Win	1–1	Jun 2002	Germany F7, Trier	Futures	Clay	(Portugal) Bernardo Mota	(Bulgaria) Radoslav Lukaev (United States) Hamid Mirzadeh	1–6, 6–1, 6–4
Loss	1–2	Jun 2002	Sassuolo, Italy	Challenger	Clay	(Italy) Manuel Jorquera	(Italy) Leonardo Azzaro (Italy) Potito Starace	3–6, 2–6
Loss	1–3	May 2003	Rome, Italy	Challenger	Clay	(Italy) Manuel Jorquera	(Israel) Amir Hadad (Argentina) Martín Vassallo Argüello	4–6, 6–3, 3–6
Loss	1–4	Aug 2003	Brindisi, Italy	Challenger	Clay	(Italy) Manuel Jorquera	(Spain) Iván Navarro (Croatia) Mario Radić	6–7^{(8–10)}, 0–6
Win	2–4	Oct 2003	Argentina F4, Mendoza	Futures	Clay	(Argentina) Brian Dabul	(Argentina) Diego Hartfield (Argentina) Damián Patriarca	7–6^{(7–4)}, 6–4
Loss	2–5	Apr 2004	Barcelona, Spain	Challenger	Clay	(Argentina) Ignacio González King	(Spain) Emilio Benfele Álvarez (Spain) Gabriel Trujillo Soler	6–7^{(5–7)}, 4–6
Loss	2–6	May 2004	San Remo, Italy	Challenger	Clay	(Italy) Manuel Jorquera	(Italy) Daniele Bracciali (Italy) Giorgio Galimberti	6–4, 6–7^{(6–8)}, 2–6
Win	3–6	Jul 2004	Tampere, Finland	Challenger	Clay	(Argentina) Andres Dellatorre	(Finland) Lassi Ketola (Finland) Tuomas Ketola	6–4, 3–6, 6–4
