= 2009 Copa Petrobras Santiago =

Tennis tournament

- Date: 19–25 October
- Edition: 3rd
- Category: ATP Challenger Tour
- Draw: 32S / 16D
- Prize money: US$ 100,000
- Surface: Clay
- Location: Santiago, Chile

Champions

Singles
- (Argentina) Eduardo Schwank

Doubles
- (Argentina) Diego Cristin / (Argentina) Eduardo Schwank
- Copa Petrobras Santiago

The 2009 Copa Petrobras Santiago was a professional tennis tournament played on outdoor red clay courts. It was part of the 2009 ATP Challenger Tour. It took place in Santiago, Chile between 19 and 25 October 2009.

== ATP entrants ==
=== Seeds ===
Country	Player	Rank^{1}	Seed
ARG	Juan Ignacio Chela	97	1
CHI	Paul Capdeville	98	2
ESP	Santiago Ventura	105	3
CHI	Nicolás Massú	118	4
ESP	Rubén Ramírez Hidalgo	124	5
ECU	Nicolás Lapentti	125	6
ARG	Sergio Roitman	132	7
ARG	Sebastián Decoud	151	8

- Rankings are as of October 12, 2009.

=== Other entrants ===
The following players received wildcards into the singles main draw:

- (Chile) Guillermo Hormazábal
- (Brazil) Fernando Romboli
- (Chile) Cristóbal Saavedra-Corvalán
- (Argentina) Mariano Zabaleta

The following players received entry from the qualifying draw:

- (Argentina) Diego Cristín
- (Chile) Adrián García
- (Argentina) Mariano Puerta
- (Argentina) Marco Trungelliti

=== Retirements ===
- (Spain) Santiago Ventura (retired due to abdominal pain)

== Champions ==
=== Singles ===
(Argentina) Eduardo Schwank def. (Chile) Nicolás Massú, 6–2, 6–2

=== Doubles ===
(Argentina) Diego Cristín / (Argentina) Eduardo Schwank def. (Argentina) Juan Pablo Brzezicki / (Spain) David Marrero, 6–4, 7–5
