= Giovanni Lapentti =

Ecuadorian tennis player

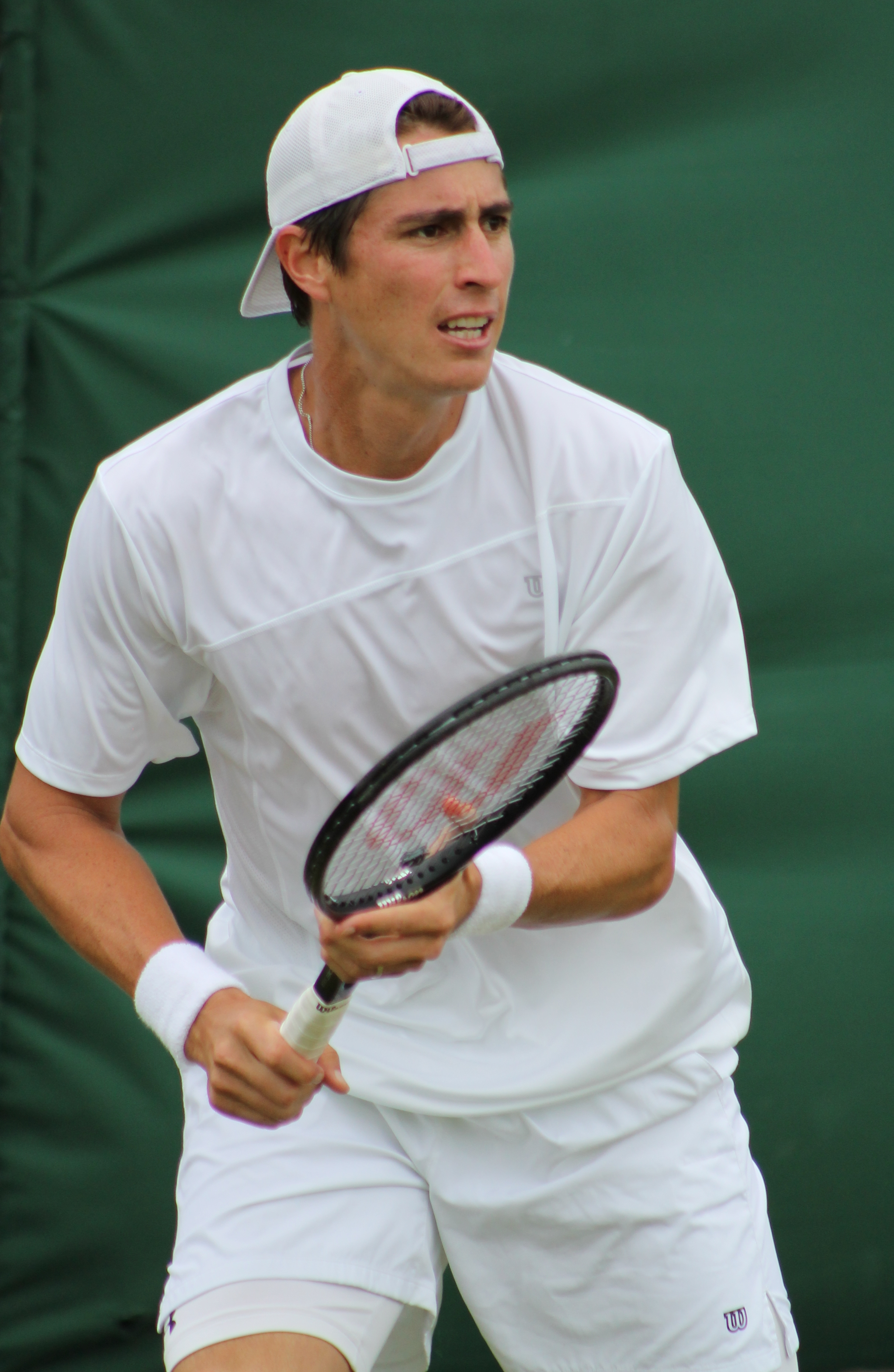
- Lapentti in 2014
- Country (sports): Ecuador
- Residence: Miami, Florida, USA
- Born: January 25, 1983 (age 43) Guayaquil, Ecuador
- Height: 1.93 m (6 ft 4 in)
- Turned pro: 2002
- Retired: 2017
- Plays: Right-handed (two-handed backhand)
- Prize money: $588,402

Singles
- Career record: 19–37 (at ATP Tour level, Grand Slam level, and in Davis Cup)
- Career titles: 0
- Highest ranking: No. 110 (May 23 2005)

Grand Slam singles results
- Australian Open: Q2 (2009)
- French Open: 1R (2003)
- Wimbledon: Q3 (2003, 2004)
- US Open: 1R (2009)

Doubles
- Career record: 12–18 (at ATP Tour level, Grand Slam level, and in Davis Cup)
- Career titles: 0
- Highest ranking: No. 176 (June 14 2004)

Grand Slam doubles results
- Wimbledon: 3R (2003)
- Last updated on: July 28, 2024.

Giovanni Lapentti Gómez (Spanish pronunciation: [ɟʝoˈβani laˈpenti]; born 25 January 1983) is a former Ecuadorian tennis player. He reached a career-high singles ranking of world No. 110 in May 2005.

== Personal life ==
His brother is Nicolás Lapentti, another professional tennis player, while a third brother, Leonardo, was also active at the lower levels of professional tennis.

Lapentti married Andrea Gómez Miss Venezuela 2004 in 2011 and became a father in 2012.

Lapentti is currently in charge of the player relations at the Cranbrook Tennis Classic.

== Tennis career ==
=== 2002-2004 ===
Lapentti announced his ATP debut in 2002, but he actually had his first tour match in 2003, at the Franklin Templeton Classic in Scottsdale, Arizona, United States. Lapentti obtained his first professional victory at that tournament's first round, defeating Paradorn Srichaphan, 7–6 (7–2), 6–2. He lost in the tournament's second round to David Sánchez.

He participated in 2003's Italian and French Open, losing in the first round both times. During the French Open, he was leading 2 sets to 1 against Tommy Robredo but had to retire due to an injury while trailing the fourth set; the injury did not allow him to return to the professional men's tennis tour until 2004.

Lapentti did not obtain a single victory during his second year as a professional, but he participated in tournaments held in Argentina, Mexico, Spain and Indian Wells, California.

=== 2005-2013 ===
Lapentti had better results in 2005, losing in the Davis Cup playoffs to Jürgen Melzer (he only played one Davis Cup game that year), advancing to the second round of the Legg Mason Classic, where he was defeated by Andy Roddick, getting to an ATP's tournament's third round for the first time in his career when he participated at the RCA Championships (losing to Paul Goldstein in the third round), making the second round of the Campbell's Hall of Fame Championship and the third round of the Tennis Channel Open. The only tournament that he participated in and failed to reach the second round during 2005 was the Pacific Life Open in Indian Wells, where he lost to Kevin Kim.

Lapentti was eliminated in the first round of 2006's Pacific Life Open, that time by Mardy Fish. In June 2008 Lapentii won the Manta Open and had accomplished his goal also winning Costa Rica Seguros Bolivar Open in March 2011.

== ATP Challenger and ITF Futures finals ==
=== Singles: 23 (15–8) ===
Legend (singles) ATP Challenger Tour (10–6) ITF Futures Tour (5–2)	Finals by surface Hard (5–3) Clay (10–5) Grass (0–0) Carpet (0–0)

Result	W–L	Date	Tournament	Tier	Surface	Opponent	Score
Win	1–0	Sep 2001	Peru F1, Lima	Futures	Clay	(Argentina) Juan Pablo Di Cesare	6–2, 6–3
Win	2–0	Nov 2001	Venezuela F2, Caracas	Futures	Clay	(Austria) Marko Neunteibl	6–1, 6–1
Loss	2–1	Oct 2002	Quito, Ecuador	Challenger	Clay	(Belgium) Dick Norman	4–6, 3–6
Win	3–1	Mar 2003	Salinas, Ecuador	Challenger	Hard	(Peru) Iván Miranda	6–3, 6–4
Win	4–1	Jul 2003	Campos do Jordao, Brazil	Challenger	Hard	(Japan) Gouichi Motomura	6–4, 6–0
Win	5–1	Oct 2003	Quito, Ecuador	Challenger	Clay	(Brazil) Ricardo Mello	6–3, 6–7^{(8–10)}, 6–3
Win	6–1	Nov 2003	Waco, USA	Challenger	Clay	(United States) Paul Goldstein	6–4, 6–3
Loss	6–2	Jul 2004	Campos do Jordao, Brazil	Challenger	Hard	(Japan) Takao Suzuki	4–6, 3–6
Win	7–2	Aug 2004	Manta, Ecuador	Challenger	Hard	(Argentina) Carlos Berlocq	6–7^{(2–7)}, 6–3, 6–4
Win	8–2	Oct 2004	Quito, Ecuador	Challenger	Clay	(Romania) Răzvan Sabău	6–4, 6–3
Loss	8–3	Jan 2005	São Paulo, Brazil	Challenger	Hard	(Brazil) Ricardo Mello	6–4, 2–6, 6–7^{(0–7)}
Loss	8–4	Jun 2006	Brazil F4, Piracicaba	Futures	Clay	(Brazil) Rogerio Dutra Silva	0–6, 6–2, 6–7^{(2–7)}
Loss	8–5	Jul 2006	Cuenca, Ecuador	Challenger	Clay	(Colombia) Carlos Salamanca	6–4, 6–7^{(8–10)}, 5–7
Win	9–5	Sep 2007	Ecuador F3, Quito	Futures	Clay	(Ecuador) Carlos Avellan	7–5, 6–4
Win	10–5	Sep 2007	Bolivia F2, Cochabamba	Futures	Clay	(Argentina) Damian Patriarca	6–3, 6–3
Loss	10–6	Oct 2007	Quito, Ecuador	Challenger	Clay	(Colombia) Santiago Giraldo	6–7^{(4–7)}, 4–6
Win	11–6	Jul 2008	Manta, Ecuador	Challenger	Hard	(Brazil) Ricardo Mello	6–2, 6–4
Win	12–6	Sep 2008	Quito, Ecuador	Challenger	Clay	(Italy) Riccardo Ghedin	6–4, 6–4
Win	13–6	Oct 2010	Quito, Ecuador	Challenger	Clay	(Brazil) João Souza	2–6, 6–3, 6–4
Win	14–6	Mar 2011	San Jose, Costa Rica	Challenger	Hard	(Russia) Igor Kunitsyn	7–5, 6–3
Win	15–6	Sep 2014	Ecuador F6, Ibarra	Futures	Clay	(Argentina) Marco Trungelliti	6–2, 7–6^{(7–4)}
Loss	15–7	Dec 2014	Mexico F14, Merida	Futures	Hard	(United States) Dennis Novikov	3–6, 7–6^{(9–7)}, 6–7^{(3–7)}
Loss	15–8	May 2015	Cali, Colombia	Challenger	Clay	(Brazil) Fernando Romboli	6–4, 3–6, 2–6

=== Grand Slam and Masters performance ===
Tournament	2001	2002	2003	2004	2005	2006	2007	2008	2009	2010	2011	2012	2013	2014	2015	2016	W–L
Grand Slam tournaments
Australian Open	A	A	Q2	Q1	A	A	A	A	Q2	A	Q1	A	A	A	A	A	0–0
French Open	A	A	1R	Q2	Q1	A	A	A	Q1	Q1	Q1	A	A	Q1	A	A	0–1
Wimbledon	A	Q1	Q3	Q3	A	A	A	A	Q1	A	Q1	A	A	Q1	Q1	A	0–0
US Open	A	A	Q2	A	Q3	A	A	Q3	1R	Q1	A	A	Q1	A	Q1	A	0–1
Win–loss	0–0	0–0	0–1	0–0	0–0	0–0	0–0	0–0	0–1	0–0	0–0	0–0	0–0	0–0	0–0	0–0	0–2
ATP Masters 1000 tournaments
Indian Wells	A	A	A	1R	1R	1R	A	A	A	Q2	A	A	A	A	A	Q2	0–3
Miami	Q1	A	Q1	Q1	Q1	A	A	A	A	A	A	A	A	A	A	A	0–0
Canada	A	A	A	A	Q1	A	A	A	A	A	A	A	A	A	A	A	0–0
Cincinnati	A	A	A	A	Q2	A	A	A	A	A	A	A	A	A	A	A	0–0
Win–loss	0–0	0–0	0–0	0–1	0–1	0–1	0–0	0–0	0–0	0–0	0–0	0–0	0–0	0–0	0–0	0–0	0–3

=== Doubles: 10 (9–1) ===
Legend (doubles) ATP Challenger Tour (6–1) ITF Futures Tour (3–0)	Finals by surface Hard (3–0) Clay (6–1) Grass (0–0) Carpet (0–0)

Result	W–L	Date	Tournament	Tier	Surface	Partner	Opponents	Score
Win	1–0	Oct 2000	Colombia F1, Bogotá	Futures	Clay	(Colombia) Ruben Tolles	(Argentina) Gustavo Marcaccio (Argentina) Patricio Rudi	7–5, 2–0 ret.
Win	2–0	Oct 2001	Venezuela F1, Caracas	Futures	Clay	(Venezuela) Jose De Armas	(Croatia) Ivan Cinkus (Hungary) Gergely Kisgyorgy	walkover
Win	3–0	Nov 2001	Venezuela F2, Caracas	Futures	Clay	(Venezuela) Jose De Armas	(Spain) Antonio Baldellou-Esteva (Spain) David Cors-Pares	6–4, 6–3
Win	4–0	Jul 2003	Campos do Jordao, Brazil	Challenger	Hard	(South Africa) Rik De Voest	(Argentina) Carlos Berlocq (Mexico) Miguel Gallardo-Valles	6–1, 7–5
Win	5–0	May 2004	Ljubljana, Slovenia	Challenger	Clay	(South Africa) Rik De Voest	(Sweden) Robert Lindstedt (United States) Michael Russell	6–3, 6–4
Win	6–0	Jan 2005	Santiago, Chile	Challenger	Clay	(Argentina) Damian Patriarca	(Italy) Enzo Artoni (Argentina) Ignacio Gonzalez King	6–2, 4–6, 6–4
Win	7–0	Feb 2005	Dallas, United States	Challenger	Hard	(South Africa) Rik De Voest	(Paraguay) Ramón Delgado (Brazil) André Sá	6–4, 6–4
Loss	7–1	Oct 2005	Santiago, Chile	Challenger	Clay	(Argentina) Lucas Arnold Ker	(Austria) Daniel Koellerer (Austria) Oliver Marach	4–6, 3–6
Win	8–1	Apr 2011	Recife, Brazil	Challenger	Hard	(Brazil) Fernando Romboli	(Brazil) André Ghem (Brazil) Rodrigo Guidolin	6–2, 6–1
Win	9–1	Feb 2016	Santo Domingo, Dominican Republic	Challenger	Clay	(Uruguay) Ariel Behar	(France) Jonathan Eysseric (Croatia) Franko Skugor	7–5, 6–4

== Junior Grand Slam finals ==
=== Doubles: 2 (1 title, 1 runner-up) ===
Result	Year	Tournament	Surface	Partner	Opponents	Score
Loss	2001	Australian Open	Hard	(Canada) Frank Dancevic	(United States) Ytai Abougzir (Argentina) Luciano Vitullo	4–6, 6–7^{(5–7)}
Win	2001	Wimbledon	Grass	(Canada) Frank Dancevic	(Mexico) Bruno Echagaray (Mexico) Santiago González	6–1, 6–4
