= Jiří Vaněk (tennis) =

Czech tennis player (born 1978)

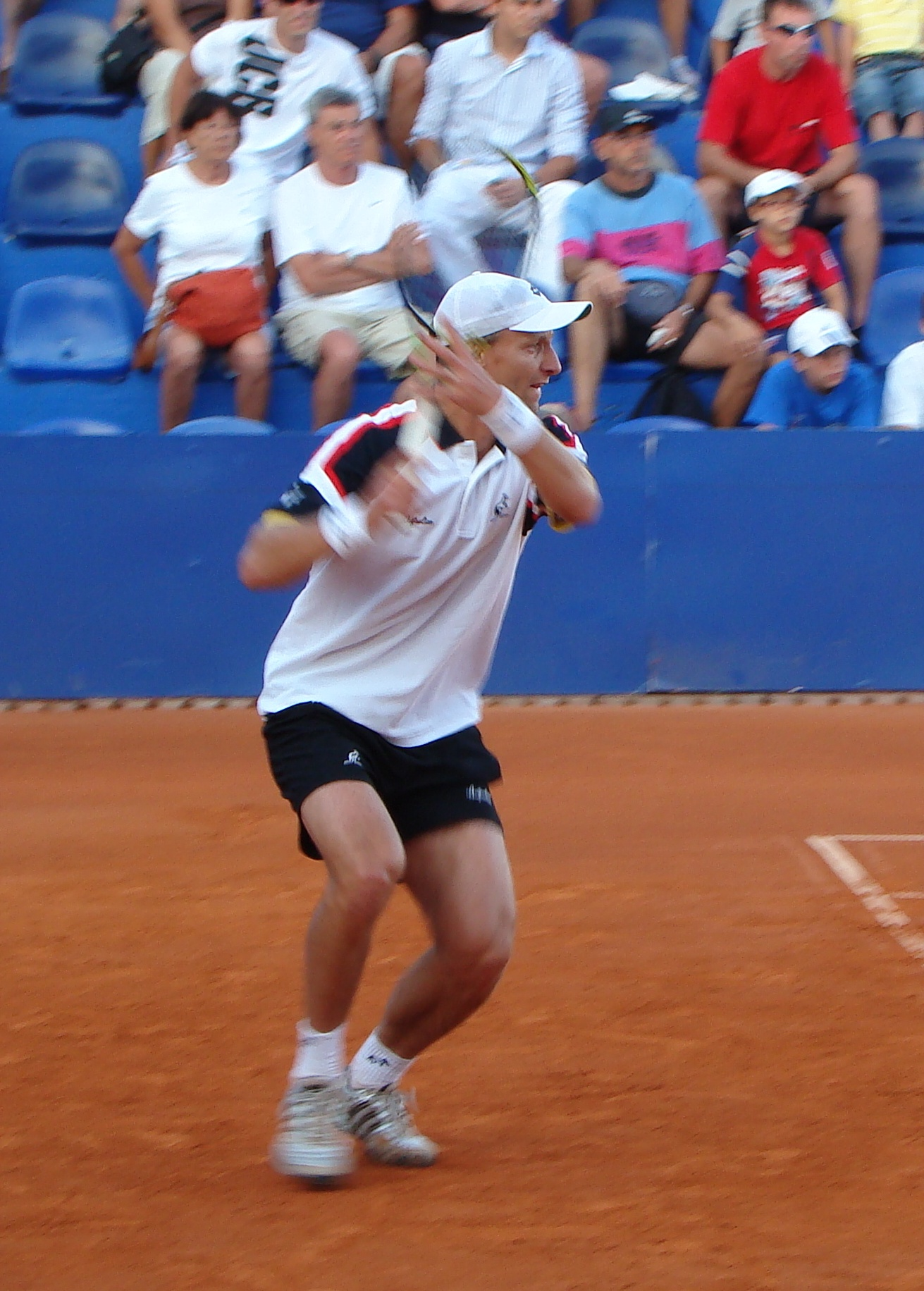
- Country (sports): Czech Republic
- Residence: Prague, Czech Republic
- Born: 24 April 1978 (age 48) Domažlice, Czechoslovakia
- Height: 6 ft 1 in (185 cm)
- Turned pro: 1995
- Retired: 2011
- Plays: Right-handed (two-handed backhand)
- Prize money: $1,600,539

Singles
- Career record: 68–122
- Career titles: 0
- Highest ranking: No. 74 (16 October 2000)

Grand Slam singles results
- Australian Open: 2R (2000)
- French Open: 2R (2000, 2006, 2008)
- Wimbledon: 1R (2000, 2001, 2005, 2006, 2008)
- US Open: 2R (2008)

Other tournaments
- Olympic Games: 2R (2000)

Doubles
- Career record: 16–32
- Career titles: 0
- Highest ranking: No. 94 (6 February 2006)

Grand Slam doubles results
- Australian Open: 2R (2006)
- French Open: 1R (2005, 2008)
- Wimbledon: 1R (2006)

Coaching career
- Karolína Plíšková; Petra Kvitová

Coaching awards and records
- Spouse: Petra Kvitová (m. 2023)
- Last updated on: 18 June 2021.

Jiří Vaněk (born 24 April 1978) is a former professional tennis player from the Czech Republic. He was a coach of former world #1 player Karolína Plíšková and two-time Wimbledon champion Petra Kvitová, with whom he has a romantic relationship since August 2021.

== Tennis career ==
=== Juniors ===
He was an impressive junior, reaching as high as No. 14 in the junior singles world rankings (and No. 21 in doubles) in 1995, making the semifinals of the French Open and the quarterfinals of the Australian Open boys' singles in 1996.

=== Pro tour ===
Vanek turned professional in 1996, winning 11 Challenger events and reaching a career-high singles ranking of World No. 74 in October 2000.

He competed in the 2000 Summer Olympics in Sydney, reaching the second round.

== ATP career finals ==
=== Doubles: 1 (1 runner-up) ===
Legend Grand Slam tournaments (0–0) ATP World Tour Finals (0–0) ATP World Tour Masters 1000 (0–0) ATP World Tour 500 Series (0–0) ATP World Tour 250 Series (0–1)	Titles by surface Hard (0–0) Clay (0–1) Grass (0–0)	Titles by setting Outdoor (0–1) Indoor (0–0)

Result	W–L	Date	Tournament	Tier	Surface	Partner	Opponents	Score
Loss	0–1	Feb 2005	Acapulco, Mexico	250 Series	Clay	(Czech Republic) Tomáš Zíb	(Spain) David Ferrer (Spain) Santiago Ventura	6–4, 1–6, 4–6

== ATP Challenger and ITF Futures finals ==
=== Singles: 22 (11–11) ===
Legend ATP Challenger (11–11) ITF Futures (0–0)	Finals by surface Hard (1–0) Clay (9–11) Grass (0–0) Carpet (1–0)

Result	W–L	Date	Tournament	Tier	Surface	Opponent	Score
Win	1–0	Aug 1998	Warsaw, Poland	Challenger	Clay	(Russia) Andrei Cherkasov	7–6, 7–5
Win	2–0	Sep 1998	Belgrade, Yugoslavia	Challenger	Clay	(Argentina) Diego Moyano	6–3, 6–3
Loss	2–1	Oct 1999	Lima, Peru	Challenger	Clay	(Argentina) Juan Ignacio Chela	2–6, 5–7
Win	3–1	Feb 2000	Ho Chi Minh City, Vietnam	Challenger	Hard	(Belgium) Reginald Willems	7–6^{(7–5)}, 6–4
Loss	3–2	Mar 2000	Lisbon, Portugal	Challenger	Clay	(Spain) David Sánchez Muñoz	4–6, 6–3, 2–6
Loss	3–3	Oct 2000	Cairo, Egypt	Challenger	Clay	(Spain) Albert Portas	5–7, 3–6
Win	4–3	Jun 2001	Weiden, Germany	Challenger	Clay	(United States) Hugo Armando	7–5, 6–2
Win	5–3	Jun 2001	Lugano, Switzerland	Challenger	Clay	(Costa Rica) Juan Antonio Marín	6–2, 6–3
Loss	5–4	Jul 2002	Budaörs, Hungary	Challenger	Clay	(Argentina) Diego Moyano	6–4, 3–6, 4–6
Loss	5–5	Aug 2002	Trani, Italy	Challenger	Clay	(Argentina) Mariano Delfino	4–6, 6–7^{(6–8)}
Win	6–5	Jun 2003	Ljubljana, Slovenia	Challenger	Clay	(Serbia and Montenegro) Boris Pashanski	6–3, 3–6, 6–1
Win	7–5	May 2004	Ljubljana, Slovenia	Challenger	Clay	(Germany) Björn Phau	5–7, 6–1, 7–6^{(7–5)}
Win	8–5	Jun 2004	Furth, Germany	Challenger	Clay	(France) Gilles Simon	7–5, 6–2
Loss	8–6	Sep 2004	Kyiv, Ukraine	Challenger	Clay	(Spain) Nicolás Almagro	6–4, 3–6, 2–6
Win	9–6	Jan 2005	Heilbronn, Germany	Challenger	Carpet	(Germany) Lars Burgsmüller	6–2, 6–4
Loss	9–7	May 2005	Prague, Czech Republic	Challenger	Clay	(Czech Republic) Jan Hernych	6–3, 4–6, 3–6
Loss	9–8	May 2007	Prague, Czech Republic	Challenger	Clay	(Czech Republic) Dušan Lojda	7–6^{(7–3)}, 2–6, 6–7^{(5–7)}
Loss	9–9	Jun 2007	Lugano, Switzerland	Challenger	Clay	(Austria) Werner Eschauer	4–6, 6–4, 6–7^{(2–7)}
Win	10–9	Aug 2007	Manerbio, Italy	Challenger	Clay	(France) Éric Prodon	6–0, 6–4
Loss	10–10	Mar 2008	Meknes, Morocco	Challenger	Clay	(Spain) Iván Navarro	4–6, 4–6
Win	11–10	May 2008	Ostrava, Czech Republic	Challenger	Clay	(Czech Republic) Jan Hernych	6–3, 4–6, 6–1
Loss	11–11	Jun 2009	Košice, Slovakia	Challenger	Clay	(France) Stéphane Robert	6–7^{(5–7)}, 6–7^{(5–7)}

=== Doubles: 6 (1–5) ===
Legend ATP Challenger (1–5) ITF Futures (0–0)	Finals by surface Hard (0–1) Clay (1–4) Grass (0–0) Carpet (0–0)

Result	W–L	Date	Tournament	Tier	Surface	Partner	Opponents	Score
Loss	0–1	Aug 1996	Pilzen, Czech Republic	Challenger	Clay	(Czech Republic) Michal Tabara	(Czech Republic) Petr Luxa (Czech Republic) Jan Kodeš Jr.	3–6, 5–7
Loss	0–2	Jul 2002	Budaors, Hungary	Challenger	Clay	(Czech Republic) Robin Vik	(Chile) Hermes Gamonal (Chile) Adrián García	3–6, 6–0, 3–6
Loss	0–3	Mar 2004	Saint Brieuc, France	Challenger	Clay	(Czech Republic) David Škoch	(Belgium) Christophe Rochus (Belgium) Tom Vanhoudt	0–6, 1–6
Loss	0–4	Apr 2004	Napoli, Italy	Challenger	Clay	(Czech Republic) Michal Tabara	(Germany) Tomas Behrend (Italy) Giorgio Galimberti	1–6, 3–6
Loss	0–5	Nov 2004	Réunion Island, France	Challenger	Hard	(Switzerland) Michel Kratochvil	(Thailand) Sonchat Ratiwatana (Thailand) Sanchai Ratiwatana	walkover
Win	1–5	Apr 2005	Napoli, Italy	Challenger	Clay	(Serbia and Montenegro) Janko Tipsarević	(Italy) Uros Vico (Italy) Massimo Bertolini	3–6, 6–4, 6–2

== Performance timeline ==
Key
W	F	SF	QF	#R	RR	Q#	DNQ	A	NH

(W) winner; (F) finalist; (SF) semifinalist; (QF) quarterfinalist; (#R) rounds 4, 3, 2, 1; (RR) round-robin stage; (Q#) qualification round; (DNQ) did not qualify; (A) absent; (NH) not held; (SR) strike rate (events won / competed); (W–L) win–loss record.

=== Singles ===
Tournament	1996	1997	1998	1999	2000	2001	2002	2003	2004	2005	2006	2007	2008	2009	2010	SR	W–L	Win %
Grand Slam tournaments
Australian Open	Q1	A	A	Q1	2R	1R	1R	1R	Q3	Q1	1R	1R	1R	A	A	0 / 7	1–7	13%
French Open	A	A	A	Q2	2R	1R	A	Q1	Q2	1R	2R	Q1	2R	1R	Q1	0 / 6	3–6	33%
Wimbledon	A	A	A	A	1R	1R	A	A	Q2	1R	1R	A	1R	Q1	A	0 / 5	0–5	0%
US Open	A	A	A	A	1R	1R	1R	Q1	Q2	1R	1R	A	2R	A	A	0 / 6	1–6	14%
Win–loss	0–0	0–0	0–0	0–0	2–4	0–4	0–2	0–1	0–0	0–3	1–4	0–1	2–4	0–1	0–0	0 / 24	5–24	17%
ATP Tour Masters 1000
Indian Wells Masters	A	A	A	A	A	Q2	A	A	A	A	Q1	Q1	A	A	A	0 / 0	0–0	–
Miami Open	A	A	A	A	A	2R	A	A	A	A	Q1	A	A	A	A	0 / 1	1–1	50%
Hamburg	A	A	A	A	A	Q1	A	A	A	A	A	A	A	NMS		0 / 0	0–0	–
Canada Masters	A	A	A	A	A	A	A	Q2	A	A	A	A	A	A	A	0 / 0	0–0	–
Cincinnati Masters	A	A	A	A	A	A	A	Q2	A	A	A	A	A	A	A	0 / 0	0–0	–
Paris Masters	A	A	A	A	Q2	A	A	A	A	A	A	A	A	A	A	0 / 0	0–0	–
Win–loss	0–0	0–0	0–0	0–0	0–0	1–1	0–0	0–0	0–0	0–0	0–0	0–0	0–0	0–0	0–0	0 / 1	1–1	50%

== Personal life ==
On 22 July 2023, Petra Kvitová and Jiří Vaněk got married.
