= Andres Dellatorre =

Argentine tennis player

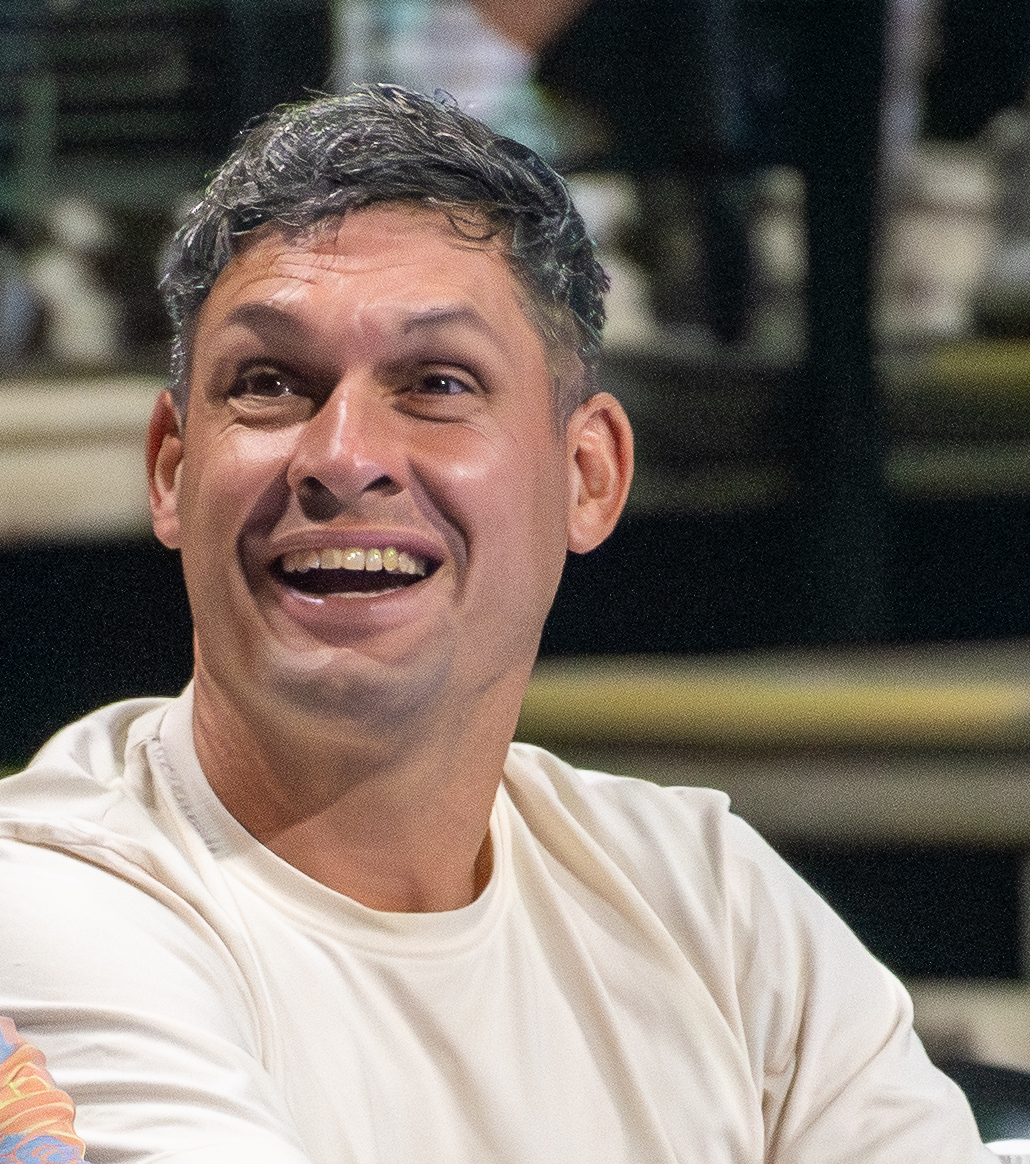
- Country (sports): Argentina
- Born: 9 July 1980 (age 45) Buenos Aires, Argentina
- Plays: Right-handed
- Prize money: $80,701

Singles
- Career record: 0–0
- Career titles: 0
- Highest ranking: No. 210 (6 October 2003)

Doubles
- Career record: 0–0
- Career titles: 1
- Highest ranking: No. 209 (10 January 2005)
- Last updated on: 26 August 2019.

Andres Dellatorre (born 9 July 1980) is an Argentine tennis player.

Dellatorre has a career high ATP singles ranking of 210 achieved on 6 October 2003. He also has a career high doubles ranking of 209 achieved on 10 January 2005.

Dellatorre has won 1 ATP Challenger doubles title at the 2004 Tampere Open.

== Tour titles ==
Legend
Grand Slam (0)
ATP Masters Series (0)
ATP Tour (0)
Challengers (1)

=== Doubles ===
Result	Date	Category	Tournament	Surface	Partner	Opponents	Score
Winner	July 2004	Challenger	Tampere, Finland	Clay	(Argentina) Diego Moyano	(Finland) Lassi Ketola (Finland) Tuomas Ketola	6–4, 3–6, 6–4
