= Hermes Gamonal =

Chilean tennis player

- Country (sports): Chile
- Residence: Santiago
- Born: 31 May 1977 (age 48) Bulnes, Chile
- Height: 1.80 m (5 ft 11 in)
- Turned pro: 1997
- Retired: 2006
- Plays: Right-handed
- Prize money: $180,996

Singles
- Career record: 5–11
- Career titles: 0
- Highest ranking: No. 135 (15 September 2003)

Grand Slam singles results
- Australian Open: Q1 (2004)
- French Open: 1R (2003)
- Wimbledon: Q1 (2002, 2003, 2004)
- US Open: Q2 (2003, 2004)

Doubles
- Career record: 5–13
- Career titles: 0
- Highest ranking: No. 181 (4 April 2005)

Hermes Gamonal (born 31 May 1977) is a former professional tennis player from Chile.

== Career ==
Gamonal first played Davis Cup tennis for Chile in 1998 and by the time he retired had taken part in nine ties. He won three of his eight singles rubbers and four of his five doubles matches.

The Chilean appeared in one Grand Slam event during his career, the 2003 French Open. He lost in straight sets to Christophe Rochus in the first round.

By late 2006, Gamonal decided to retire from professional tennis, claiming that multiple injuries interrupted his career.

== Challenger titles ==
=== Singles: (1) ===
| No. | Year | Tournament | Surface | Opponent | Score |
|---|---|---|---|---|---|
| 1. | 2002 | Waco, United States | Hard | (Czech Republic) Jan Hernych | 6–1, 3–6, 6–3 |

=== Doubles: (1) ===
| No. | Year | Tournament | Surface | Partner | Opponents | Score |
|---|---|---|---|---|---|---|
| 1. | 2002 | Budaors, Hungary | Clay | (Chile) Adrián García | (Czech Republic) Jiří Vaněk (Czech Republic) Robin Vik | 6–3, 0–6, 6–3 |
