= Damián Patriarca =

Argentine tennis player

- Full name: Damián Patriarca
- Country (sports): Argentina
- Born: 28 June 1983 (age 43) Paraná, Entre Ríos, Argentina
- Plays: Right-handed
- Prize money: $99,782

Singles
- Career record: 0–1
- Highest ranking: No. 253 (10 April 2006)

Doubles
- Highest ranking: No. 173 (7 March 2005)

Damián Patriarca (born 28 June 1983) is a former professional tennis player from Argentina.

== Biography ==
Born in Paraná to Sergio and Silvia Patriarca, he is one of three brothers and learned his tennis at the local Club de Tenis Urquiza.

Patriarca, who played right-handed, turned professional in 2000 and won regular titles on the Futures circuit during his career. In 2005 he won two Challenger tournaments in doubles and was singles runner-up at the Geneva Open Challenger, along the way beating Andreas Vinciguerra and Óscar Hernández. He took part in the qualifying draw of the men's singles at the 2006 Wimbledon Championships and a month later qualified for the Austrian Open Kitzbühel, his only main draw appearance on the ATP Tour. In the first round he played an Austrian, Andreas Haider-Maurer, who beat him in three sets.

An ankle injury forced him to retire from professional tennis aged 24 and he instead turned to coaching. He was the coach of Juan Mónaco in the 2013 season and has since moved to the Mexican city of Acapulco to run a tennis school.

== Challenger titles ==
=== Doubles: (2) ===
No.	Year	Tournament	Surface	Partner	Opponents	Score
1.	2005	Santiago, Chile	Clay	(Ecuador) Giovanni Lapentti	(Italy) Enzo Artoni (Argentina) Ignacio González King	6–2, 4–6, 6–4
2.	2005	Montevideo, Uruguay	Clay	(Argentina) Brian Dabul	(Austria) Daniel Köllerer (Austria) Oliver Marach	6–0, 6–4
