= Felipe Parada =

Chilean tennis player

- Country (sports): Chile
- Residence: Santiago, Chile
- Born: 16 May 1981 (age 44) Santiago, Chile
- Height: 1.75 m (5 ft 9 in)
- Turned pro: 2000
- Plays: Right-handed
- Prize money: US $77,520

Singles
- Career record: 0-2 (at ATP Tour level, Grand Slam level, and in Davis Cup)
- Career titles: 0
- Highest ranking: No. 371 (19 June 2006)

Doubles
- Career record: 1-1
- Career titles: 0
- Highest ranking: No. 149 (19 June 2006)

Felipe Parada (Spanish pronunciation: [feˈlipe paˈɾaða]; born 16 May 1982) is a Chilean professional tennis player.

== ATP Challenger & ITF Futures ==
=== Singles Titles (1 ===
Legend
ATP Challenger Series
ITF Futures Series (1)

No.	Date	Tournament	Surface	Opponent	Score
1.	9 September 2002	Bolivia F1, Bolivia	Clay	(Argentina) Ignacio González King	6–3, 6–4
