= Jorge Aguilar =

Chilean tennis player

Jorge Aguilar Mondaca
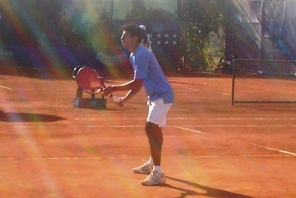
- Country (sports): Chile
- Residence: Santiago, Chile
- Born: 8 January 1985 (age 41) Santiago, Chile
- Height: 1.78 m (5 ft 10 in)
- Turned pro: 2003
- Retired: 10 October 2015
- Plays: Right-handed (two-handed backhand)
- Prize money: $312,749

Singles
- Career record: 5–6 (at ATP World Tour level, Grand Slams and Davis Cup)
- Career titles: 0
- Highest ranking: No. 167 (11 October 2010)

Grand Slam singles results
- French Open: 1R (2010)
- Wimbledon: Q1 (2011, 2013)

Doubles
- Career record: 4–10 (at ATP Tour level, Grand Slam level and in Davis Cup)
- Career titles: 0
- Highest ranking: No. 170 (26 September 2011)

Coaching career (2015)
- Cristian Garín (2015)
Medal record
Representing Chile
Men's tennis
Pan American Games
Silver medal – second place	2007 Rio de Janeiro	Men's doubles
Bolivarian Games
Gold medal – first place	2013 Trujillo	Men's Nations Cup
South American Games
Bronze medal – third place	2014 Santiago	Men's doubles
Bronze medal – third place	2014 Santiago	Mixed doubles

Jorge Roberto Aguilar Mondaca (Spanish pronunciation: [ˈxoɾxe aɣiˈlaɾ]; born 8 January 1985) is a Chilean former professional tennis player.

== Tennis career ==
=== Juniors ===
In 2001 won the U16 world championship with best friend Guillermo Hormazábal and Carlos Rios. Aguilar reached as high as No. 14 in the junior world singles rankings in 2002 (and No. 22 in doubles).

=== Pro tour ===
On 8 March 2010, he made his debut in Davis Cup singles for disputing the fifth point of the series against Israel, facing Harel Levy, defeating him 7–6^{(7–3)}, 6–1. One day before his debut in doubles with Paul Capdeville, falling in five sets to the Israeli couple experienced Jonathan Erlich and Andy Ram. In that series 4–1 Chile defeated the team of Israel, thus Chile ranks second round, where they will face the Czech Republic.

On 10 October 2015, Aguilar announced his retirement from professional tennis after his participation in the Future F6 in Santiago de Chile. In his last match, he lost against Guillermo Rivera Aránguiz in the final, 3–6, 6–4, 5–7. Following his retirement, Aguilar also announced that he would be the head coach of Chilean tennis player Cristian Garín for the remainder of the 2015 season.

== ATP Challenger & ITF Futures finals ==
=== Singles: 41 (22-19) ===
Legend (singles)
ATP Challenger Tour (0–1)
ITF Futures Tour (22–18)

Outcome	W–L	Date	Tournament	Surface	Opponent	Score
Loss	0–1	Jan 2003	El Salvador F2	Clay	(Colombia) Alejandro Falla	4–6, 4–6
Loss	0–2	Jun 2004	USA F17	Clay	(United States) Michael Russell	3–6, 0–6
Loss	0–3	Apr 2005	Chile F1	Clay	(Argentina) Juan Martín del Potro	4–6, 6–7^{(6)}
Loss	0–4	Jun 2005	Romania F8	Clay	(Romania) Victor Crivoi	1–6, 2–6
Loss	0–5	Jul 2005	Romania F13	Clay	(Spain) Cesar Ferrer-Victoria	4–6, 6–3, 3–6
Loss	0–6	May 2006	Colombia F4	Clay	(Colombia) Pablo González	4–6, 6–3, 5–7
Win	1–6	Aug 2006	Mexico F13	Clay	(Mexico) Daniel Garza	7–6^{(4)}, 6–1
Win	2–6	Nov 2006	Chile F3	Clay	(Peru) Iván Miranda	6–1, 6–4
Win	3–6	Oct 2007	Chile F1	Clay	(Argentina) Damián Patriarca	6–3, 3–6, 7–6^{(8)}
Win	4–6	Nov 2007	Chile F6	Clay	(Argentina) Leandro Migani	6–1, 3–6, 7–5
Win	5–6	Oct 2008	Chile F1	Clay	(Uruguay) Federico Sansonetti	6–2, 6–1
Win	6–6	Oct 2008	Chile F2	Clay	(Uruguay) Federico Sansonetti	6–2, 6–2
Loss	6–7	Oct 2008	Chile F4	Clay	(Chile) Julio Peralta	4–6, 2–6
Win	7–7	Nov 2008	Peru F4	Clay	(Romania) Gabriel Moraru	4–6, 7–5, 7–6^{(4)}
Win	8–7	May 2009	Argentina F7	Clay	(Argentina) Federico Delbonis	6–3, 6–4
Win	9–7	Aug 2009	Brazil F16	Clay	(Brazil) André Miele	3–6, 6–3, 7–6^{(2)}
Win	10–7	Aug 2009	Brazil F17	Clay	(Brazil) Tiago Lopes	6–1, 6–2
Win	11–7	Oct 2009	Chile F1	Clay	(Chile) Guillermo Rivera Aránguiz	7–6^{(9)}, 6–2
Win	12–7	Oct 2009	Chile F4	Clay	(Chile) Cristóbal Saavedra Corvalán	6–7^{(10)}, 6–3, 6–3
Win	13–7	Nov 2009	Chile F5	Clay	(Peru) Iván Miranda	6–4, 7–5
Loss	13–8	Nov 2009	Lima, Peru	Clay	(Argentina) Eduardo Schwank	5–7, 4–6
Loss	13–9	Jun 2011	Netherlands F3	Clay	(Argentina) Pablo Galdón	3–6, 3–6
Win	14–9	Jul 2011	France F10	Clay	(France) Kenny de Schepper	7–6^{(4)}, 6–4
Loss	14–10	Feb 2012	Chile F1	Clay	(Chile) Guillermo Hormazábal	3–6, 6–3, 3–6
Win	15–10	Jun 2012	Chile F7	Clay	(Chile) Guillermo Rivera Aránguiz	7–6^{(4)}, 6–4
Win	16–10	Jun 2012	Peru F5	Clay	(Ecuador) Julio César Campozano	6–3, 5–7, 6–4
Loss	16–11	Jun 2012	Peru F6	Clay	(Peru) Duilio Beretta	7–5, 3–6, 5–7
Loss	16–12	Aug 2012	Italy F22	Clay	(Italy) Simone Vagnozzi	4–6, 6–7^{(5)}
Win	17–12	Sep 2012	Italy F24	Hard	(Italy) Claudio Grassi	3–6, 7–6^{(4)}, 6–3
Loss	17–13	Dec 2012	Chile F14	Clay	(Chile) Hans Podlipnik	3–6, 5–7
Win	18–13	Dec 2012	Chile F15	Clay	(Chile) Guillermo Rivera Aránguiz	5–7, 6–3, 6–3
Win	19–13	Dec 2012	Chile F16	Clay	(Chile) Hans Podlipnik	6–4, 3–6, 6–3
Loss	19–14	Oct 2013	Peru F2	Clay	(Dominican Republic) José Hernández	6–2, 3–6, 3–6
Loss	19–15	Dec 2013	Chile F12	Clay	(Japan) Yoshihito Nishioka	4–6, 2–6
Loss	19–16	Jun 2014	Netherlands F2	Clay	(Sweden) Elias Ymer	1–6, 7–5, 2–6
Win	20–16	Aug 2014	Brazil F7	Clay	(Brazil) Henrique Cunha	3–6, 6–3, 7–5
Win	21–16	Oct 2014	Chile F4	Clay	(Brazil) José Pereira	7–6^{(7–4)}, 6–4
Loss	21–17	Nov 2014	Chile F8	Clay	(Chile) Guillermo Rivera Aránguiz	7–6^{(7–5)}, 6–7^{(4–7)}, 1–4 ret
Loss	21–18	Feb 2015	Chile F1	Clay	(Chile) Juan Carlos Sáez	6–4, 6–7^{(4–7)}, 2–6
Win	22–18	Apr 2015	Chile F5	Clay	(Peru) Duilio Beretta	6–4, 4–6, 6–3
Loss	22–19	Oct 2015	Chile F6	Clay	(Chile) Guillermo Rivera Aránguiz	3–6, 6–4, 5–7

=== Doubles: 58 (36-22) ===
Legend (doubles)
ATP Challenger Tour (2–6)
ITF Futures Tour (34–16)

Outcome	W–L	Date	Tournament	Surface	Partner	Opponents	Score
Win	1–0	Sep 2004	Argentina F5	Clay	(Chile) Guillermo Hormazábal	(Argentina) Patricio Arquez (Argentina) Emiliano Redondi	3–6, 6–2, 6–3
Loss	1–1	Oct 2004	Colombia F3	Clay	(Chile) Guillermo Hormazábal	(Brazil) Lucas Engel (Brazil) André Ghem	6–7^{(2–7)}, 3–6
Win	2–1	Nov 2004	Uruguay F1	Clay	(Chile) Felipe Parada	(Argentina) Francisco Cabello (Argentina) Diego Junqueira	6–1, 4–6, 7–6^{(7–4)}
Win	3–1	Apr 2005	Chile F3	Clay	(Chile) Felipe Parada	(Uruguay) Pablo Cuevas (Argentina) Horacio Zeballos	6–3, 6–4
Loss	3–2	Jun 2005	Romania F8	Clay	(France) Julien Maes	(Romania) Adrian Barbu (Romania) Ionuț Moldovan	6–3, 5–7, 2–6
Win	4–2	Jul 2005	Romania F10	Clay	(Brazil) Caio Zampieri	(Ukraine) Nikolai Dyachok (Ukraine) Oleksandr Nedovyesov	6–4, 6–0
Win	5–2	Jul 2005	Romania F12	Clay	(Chile) Felipe Parada	(Romania) Adrian Barbu (Romania) Ionuț Moldovan	7–6^{(7–1)}, 6–7^{(5–7)}, 7-6^{(8–6)}
Win	6–2	Jul 2005	Romania F13	Clay	(Chile) Felipe Parada	(Ukraine) Nikolai Dyachok (Ukraine) Oleksandr Nedovyesov	6–1, 6–2
Loss	6–3	Jan 2006	Santiago, Chile	Clay	(Chile) Felipe Parada	(Argentina) Máximo González (Argentina) Sergio Roitman	4–6, 3–6
Loss	6–4	Mar 2006	Australia F3	Clay	(Chile) Felipe Parada	(Argentina) Damián Patriarca (Australia) Joseph Sirianni	2–6, 3–6
Win	7–4	May 2006	Colombia F3	Clay	(Mexico) Daniel Garza	(Brazil) Lucas Engel (Colombia) Michael Quintero	6–3, 6–2
Win	8–4	May 2006	Colombia F4	Clay	(Mexico) Daniel Garza	(Ecuador) Carlos Avellán (Colombia) Michael Quintero	4–6, 6–3, 6–2
Win	9–4	May 2006	Argentina F8	Clay	(Mexico) Daniel Garza	(Uruguay) Brian Dabul (Argentina) Marcel Felder	5–7, 6–4, 6–3
Loss	9–5	Jun 2006	USA F12	Hard	(Mexico) Daniel Garza	(South Africa) Kevin Anderson (United States) Scott Oudsema	3–6, 5–6
Loss	9–6	Jun 2006	USA F13	Hard	(Mexico) Daniel Garza	(South Africa) Kevin Anderson (United States) David Martin	6–7^{(5–7)}, 2–6
Loss	9–7	Sep 2006	Mexico F14	Hard	(Mexico) Daniel Garza	(United States) Lester Cook (United States) Shane La Porte	3–6, 4–6
Win	10–7	Nov 2006	Chile F2	Clay	(Argentina) Martín Alund	(Romania) Gabriel Moraru (North Macedonia) Predrag Rusevski	6–3, 6–3
Win	11–7	Nov 2006	Chile F5	Clay	(Argentina) Martín Alund	(Argentina) Demian Gschwend (Colombia) Sergio Ramirez	7–6^{(7–5)}, 3–6, 6–3
Loss	11–8	Apr 2007	San Luis Potosí, Mexico	Clay	(Colombia) Pablo González	(France) Jérémy Chardy (Brazil) Marcelo Melo	0–6, 3–6
Loss	11–9	Oct 2007	Chile F1	Clay	(Chile) Cristóbal Saavedra Corvalán	(Argentina) Andres Dellatorre (Argentina) Damián Patriarca	2–6, 2–6
Win	12–9	Nov 2007	Chile F4	Clay	(Chile) Felipe Parada	(Argentina) Juan-Pablo Amado (Montenegro) Goran Tošić	5–7, 6–3, [10–8]
Win	13–9	May 2008	Italy F12	Clay	(Ecuador) Carlos Avellán	(Italy) Giancarlo Petrazzuolo (Italy) Walter Trusendi	7–6^{(7–2)}, 6–4
Loss	13–10	Oct 2008	Chile F3	Clay	(Estonia) Mait Künnap	(Romania) Cătălin-Ionuț Gârd (Latvia) Deniss Pavlovs	4–6, 5–7
Win	14–10	May 2009	Argentina F7	Clay	(Chile) Rodrigo Perez	(Argentina) Federico Delbonis (Argentina) Juan Vazquez-Valenzuela	0–0 ret.
Win	15–10	Nov 2009	Chile F4	Clay	(Argentina) Diego Cristin	(Ecuador) Iván Endara (Italy) Daniel-Alejandro Lopez Cassaccia	6–4, 6–1
Loss	15–11	Oct 2010	Buenos Aires, Argentina	Clay	(Argentina) Federico Delbonis	(Argentina) Carlos Berlocq (Argentina) Brian Dabul	3–6, 2–6
Loss	15–12	May 2011	Fürth, Germany	Clay	(Ecuador) Julio César Campozano	(Australia) Rameez Junaid (Germany) Frank Moser	2–6, 7–6^{(2)}, 7–10
Win	16–12	Aug 2011	Trani, Italy	Clay	(Argentina) Andrés Molteni	(Italy) Giulio Di Meo (Italy) Stefano Ianni	6–4, 6–4
Loss	16–13	Dec 2011	Chile F15	Clay	(Chile) Guillermo Rivera Aránguiz	(Argentina) Martín Alund (Argentina) Andrés Molteni	4–6, 3–6
Win	17–13	Feb 2012	Chile F1	Clay	(Chile) Rodrigo Perez	(Chile) Guillermo Rivera Aránguiz (Chile) Cristóbal Saavedra Corvalán	5–7, 7–6^{(7–5)}, [10–8]
Win	18–13	Feb 2012	Chile F3	Clay	(Chile) Rodrigo Perez	(Austria) Gerald Melzer (Austria) Michael Linzer	7–6^{(7–4)}, 2–6, [10–6]
Win	19–13	Mar 2012	Chile F4	Clay	(Chile) Rodrigo Perez	(Chile) Gonzalo Lama (Colombia) Felipe Mantilla	6–3, 6–2
Loss	19–14	Mar 2012	Santiago, Chile	Clay	(Mexico) Daniel Garza	(Chile) Paul Capdeville (Uruguay) Marcel Felder	7–6^{(7–2)}, 4–6, [7–10]
Win	20–14	Jun 2012	Chile F6	Clay	(Chile) Juan Carlos Sáez	(Chile) Guillermo Rivera Aránguiz (Chile) Cristóbal Saavedra Corvalán	4–6, 6–1, [10–5]
Win	21–14	Jun 2012	Chile F7	Clay	(Chile) Juan Carlos Sáez	(Argentina) Federico Coria (Argentina) Sebastián Decoud	6–1, 6–2
Win	22–14	Jun 2012	Peru F5	Clay	(Colombia) Julio César Campozano	(El Salvador) Marcelo Arévalo (Brazil) Marcelo Demoliner	6–4, 3–6, [10–6]
Loss	22–15	Aug 2012	Italy F23	Clay	(Chile) Juan Carlos Sáez	(Germany) Alexander Satschko (Germany) Jan-Lennard Struff	6–4, 4–6, [7–10]
Win	23–15	Dec 2012	Chile F13	Clay	(Chile) Juan Carlos Sáez	(Chile) Guillermo Rivera Aránguiz (Chile) Cristóbal Saavedra Corvalán	6–2, 6–2
Loss	23–16	Dec 2012	Chile F16	Clay	(Chile) Juan Carlos Sáez	(Chile) Jorge Montero (Chile) Felipe Rios	6–3, 5–7, [7–10]
Win	24–16	Apr 2013	Panama City, Panama	Clay	(Peru) Sergio Galdós	(Colombia) Alejandro González (Ecuador) Julio César Campozano	6–4, 6–4
Win	25–16	Aug 2013	Italy F21	Clay	(Spain) Juan Lizariturry	(Italy) Daniele Giorgini (Italy) Matteo Volante	4–6, 6–3, [10–7]
Loss	25–17	Aug 2013	Italy F22	Clay	(Chile) Guillermo Hormazábal	(Croatia) Mate Delić (Italy) Stefano Travaglia	0–6, 1–6
Win	26–17	Oct 2013	Chile F5	Clay	(Chile) Víctor Núñez	(Argentina) Francisco Bahamonde (Argentina) Facundo Mena	6–2, 6–7^{(2–7)}, [10–4]
Win	27–17	Oct 2013	Peru F3	Clay	(Chile) Ricardo Urzua-Rivera	(Peru) Mauricio Echazú (Chile) Cristóbal Saavedra Corvalán	7–5, 4–6, [10–2]
Win	28–17	Dec 2013	Chile F12	Clay	(Chile) Víctor Núñez	(Chile) David Fleming (Chile) Juan Matias Gonzalez Carrasco	6–7^{(5–7)}, 6–3, [10–5]
Win	29–17	Mar 2014	Chile F1	Clay	(Chile) Guillermo Nunez	(Chile) Víctor Núñez (Chile) Ricardo Urzua-Rivera	6–7^{(1–7)}, 6–3, [10–4]
Win	30–17	Mar 2014	Chile F2	Clay	(Chile) Hans Podlipnik Castillo	(Brazil) Bruno Sant'Anna (Brazil) Caio Zampieri	6–4, 6–7^{(5–7)}, [12–10]
Loss	30–18	Apr 2014	Santiago, Chile	Clay	(Chile) Hans Podlipnik Castillo	(Chile) Cristian Garín (Chile) Nicolas Jarry	walkover
Win	31–18	May 2014	USA F12	Clay	(Mexico) Daniel Garza	(United States) Devin McCarthy (United States) Connor Smith	6–4, 6–7^{(3–7)}, [10–7]
Loss	31–19	Jun 2014	Netherlands F3	Clay	(Brazil) Thiago Monteiro	(Brazil) Wilson Leite (Sweden) Christian Lindell	3–6, 5–7
Loss	31–20	Aug 2014	Brazil F7	Clay	(Czech Republic) Nicolas Jarry	(Brazil) Rafael Matos (Sweden) Fabrício Neis	7–5, 1–6, [6–10]
Loss	31–21	Dec 2014	Argentina F20	Clay	(Chile) Cristian Garín	(Argentina) Mateo Nicolas Martinez (Argentina) Facundo Mena	6–7^{(4–7)}, 4–6
Win	32–21	Mar 2015	Chile F2	Clay	(Chile) Hans Podlipnik Castillo	(Uruguay) Martín Cuevas (Argentina) Nicolás Kicker	6–4, 7–6^{(7–5)}
Win	33–21	Apr 2015	Chile F3	Clay	(Chile) Hans Podlipnik Castillo	(Brazil) Fabrício Neis (Argentina) Nicolás Kicker	7–6^{(7–4)}, 5–7, [10–4]
Win	34–21	Apr 2015	Chile F4	Clay	(Peru) Duilio Beretta	(Brazil) André Miele (Brazil) Alexandre Tsuchiya	6–1, 6–4
Win	35–21	Apr 2015	Chile F5	Clay	(Peru) Duilio Beretta	(Argentina) Juan Pablo Ficovich (Argentina) Mariano Kestelboim	6–2, 6–2
Win	36–21	Oct 2015	Chile F6	Clay	(Chile) Víctor Núñez	(Chile) Marcelo Tomás Barrios Vera (Chile) Jorge Montero	walkover
Loss	36–22	Dec 2016	Chile F6	Clay	(Chile) Víctor Núñez	(Chile) Alejandro Tabilo (Chile) Jorge Montero	3–6, 4–6
