= Diego Cristin =

Argentine tennis player (born 1981)

- Full name: Diego Nicolás Cristin
- Country (sports): Argentina
- Born: 5 April 1981 (age 44)
- Plays: Right-handed
- Prize money: $62,084

Singles
- Highest ranking: No.297 (6 August 2007)

Doubles
- Highest ranking: No. 199 (12 April 2010)

Diego Nicolás Cristin (born 5 April 1981) is a former professional tennis player from Argentina.

== Biography ==
A right-handed player, Cristin comes from the Núñez neighbourhood of Buenos Aires.

Cristin was known for his fast serve, once registering 214 km/h while still a teenager, surpassing the fastest serve of any other Argentine player at that time.

In 2003 he had the distinction of being the first player to beat future US Open winner Juan Martín del Potro in a professional match, which he did at a local satellite tournament.

He was unable to break into the ATP Tour, featuring only as high as Challenger level. As a doubles player he made the world's top 200 and won a Challenger tournament in Santiago in 2009, partnering Eduardo Schwank.

== Challenger titles ==
=== Doubles: (1) ===
No.	Year	Tournament	Surface	Partner	Opponents	Score
1.	2009	Santiago, Chile	Clay	(Argentina) Eduardo Schwank	(Argentina) Juan Pablo Brzezicki (Spain) David Marrero	6–4, 7–5
