= Copa Petrobras Santiago =

Defunct tennis tournament
- Location: Santiago; Chile
- Category: ATP Challenger Tour
- Surface: Clay
- Draw: 32S/32Q/16D
- Prize money: $35,000+H
- Website: Official Website

The Copa Petrobras Santiago was a tennis tournament held in Santiago, Chile from 2004 to 2010. The event was part of the ATP Challenger Tour and was played on outdoor clay courts.

== Past finals ==
=== Singles ===
Year	Champion	Runner-up	Score	Ref.
2011	Not Held			
2010	(Italy) Fabio Fognini	(Chile) Paul Capdeville	6–2, 7–6^{(7–2)}	
2009	(Argentina) Eduardo Schwank	(Chile) Nicolás Massú	6–2, 6–2	
2008 - 2006	Not Held			
2005	(Brazil) Júlio Silva	(Spain) Rubén Ramírez Hidalgo	6–2, 6–3	
2004	(Spain) Óscar Hernández	(Ecuador) Nicolás Lapentti	7–6^{(7–4)}, 6–4	

=== Doubles ===
Year	Champion	Runner-up	Score
2011	Not Held		
2010	(Spain) Daniel Muñoz de la Nava (Spain) Rubén Ramírez Hidalgo	(Serbia) Nikola Ćirić (Montenegro) Goran Tošić	6–4, 6–2
2009	(Argentina) Diego Cristín (Argentina) Eduardo Schwank	(Argentina) Juan Pablo Brzezicki (Spain) David Marrero	6–4, 7–5
2008 - 2006	Not Held		
2005	(Austria) Daniel Köllerer (Austria) Oliver Marach	(Argentina) Lucas Arnold Ker (Ecuador) Giovanni Lapentti	6–4, 6–3
2004	(Italy) Enzo Artoni (Argentina) Ignacio González King	(Argentina) Brian Dabul (Argentina) Damián Patriarca	6–3, 6–0
