= Ignacio González King =

Argentine tennis player

Ignacio González
- Full name: Ignacio González King
- Country (sports): Argentina
- Born: 28 March 1980 (age 44); Buenos Aires, Argentina
- Height: 1.75 m (5 ft 9 in)
- Turned pro: 1999
- Plays: Right-handed
- Prize money: $120,966

Singles
- Career record: 0–0
- Highest ranking: No. 203 (28 July 2003)

Grand Slam singles results
- French Open: Q3 (2004)
- Wimbledon: Q2 (2004)
- US Open: Q1 (2003, 2004)

Doubles
- Career record: 6–4
- Career titles: 0
- Highest ranking: No. 82 (25 April 2005)

Ignacio González King (Note: In this Spanish name, the first or paternal surname is González and the second or maternal family name is King.) (born 28 March 1980) is a former professional tennis player from Argentina.

== Career ==
González King played only doubles on the ATP Tour. He and partner Enzo Artoni were runners-up in the 2005 Brasil Open and also made the semi-finals at Viña del Mar that year.

The Argentine player won eight doubles titles on the ATP Challenger circuit, all in the space of 15 months.

== ATP career finals ==
=== Doubles: 1 (0–1) ===
Result	W–L	Date	Tournament	Surface	Partner	Opponents	Score
Loss	0–1	Feb 2005	Costa Do Sauipe, Brazil	Clay	(Argentina) José Acasuso	(Czech Republic) František Čermák (Czech Republic) Leoš Friedl	4–6, 4–6

== Challenger titles ==
=== Singles: (1) ===
No.	Year	Tournament	Surface	Opponent	Score
1.	2004	Budaors, Hungary	Clay	(Spain) Gabriel Trujillo-Soler	6–4, 6–4

=== Doubles: (8) ===
No.	Year	Tournament	Surface	Partner	Opponents	Score
1.	2003	Kyiv, Ukraine	Clay	(Argentina) Juan Pablo Guzmán	(India) Harsh Mankad (United States) Jason Marshall	6–2, 3–6, 6–4
2.	2003	Budapest, Hungary	Clay	(Argentina) Juan Pablo Guzmán	(Hungary) Kornél Bardóczky (Hungary) Gergely Kisgyörgy	7–5, 4–6, 6–3
3.	2004	Sassuolo, Italy	Clay	(Italy) Enzo Artoni	(Italy) Gianluca Bazzica (Chile) Paul Capdeville	3–6, 6–4, 6–1
4.	2004	Budaors, Hungary	Clay	(Spain) Gabriel Trujillo-Soler	(Czech Republic) Ota Fukárek (France) Stéphane Robert	3–6, 6–2, 6–3
5.	2004	Santiago, Chile	Clay	(Italy) Enzo Artoni	(Argentina) Brian Dabul (Argentina) Damián Patriarca	6–3, 6–0
6.	2004	Buenos Aires, Argentina	Clay	(Italy) Enzo Artoni	(Romania) Victor Ioniță (Romania) Gabriel Moraru	7–5, 6–3
7.	2004	Santa Cruz de la Sierra, Bolivia	Clay	(Italy) Enzo Artoni	(Romania) Victor Ioniță (Romania) Gabriel Moraru	6–3, 6–1
8.	2004	Aracaju, Brazil	Clay	(Italy) Enzo Artoni	(Argentina) Juan Pablo Guzmán (Spain) Santiago Ventura	6–4, 6–2
