= 2009 Copa Petrobras Bogotá – Doubles =

Doubles
- 2009 Copa Petrobras Bogotá

Final
- Champions: (Colombia) Alejandro Falla (Colombia) Alejandro González
- Runners-up: (Argentina) Sebastián Decoud (Argentina) Diego Álvarez
- Score: 5–7, 6–4, [10–8]

Events
Singles	Doubles
← 2008 ·	Copa Petrobras Bogotá	· 2010 →

Juan Sebastián Cabal and Alejandro Falla were the defending champions, but Cabal didn't start this year.
Falla partnered with Alejandro González and they won this tournament, after defeating Sebastián Decoud and Diego Álvarez 5–7, 6–4, [10–8] in the final.

== Seeds ==
1. (Argentina) ~~Sebastián Prieto~~ / (Argentina) ~~Horacio Zeballos~~ (withdrew)
2. (Mexico) Santiago González / (United States) Travis Rettenmaier (semifinals)
3. (Brazil) Franco Ferreiro / (Argentina) Sergio Roitman (first round, withdrew)
4. (Argentina) Brian Dabul / (Argentina) Eduardo Schwank (quarterfinals)

== Draw ==
=== Key ===
- Q = Qualifier
- WC = Wild card
- LL = Lucky loser
- Alt = Alternate
- SE = Special exempt
- PR = Protected ranking
- ITF = ITF entry
- JE = Junior exempt
- w/o = Walkover
- r = Retired
- d = Defaulted
- SR = Special ranking

=== Draw ===
First round
ALT	(Germany) A Begemann (Argentina) N Todero	6	6
(Uruguay) M Felder (Colombia) C Salamanca	1	4
WC	(France) V Millot (Denmark) K Pless	3	6^{0}
(United States) A Bogomolov Jr. (Canada) P Polansky	6	7
3	(Brazil) F Ferreiro (Argentina) S Roitman	w/o
(Chile) P Capdeville (United States) E Nunez
WC	(Colombia) F Mantilla (Colombia) M Quintero	1	1
(Colombia) A Falla (Colombia) A González	6	6
(Argentina) D Álvarez (Argentina) S Decoud	7	6^{7}	[10]
(Spain) C Poch-Gradin (Brazil) M Torres	6^{3}	7	[6]
WC	(Colombia) J S Gómez (Colombia) S Serrano	4	3
4	(Argentina) B Dabul (Argentina) E Schwank	6	6
(Argentina) M Alund (Argentina) F del Bonis	2	0
(Brazil) R Mello (Brazil) C Zampieri	6	6
(Italy) R Ghedin (Colombia) S Giraldo	4	0
2	(Mexico) S González (United States) T Rettenmaier	6	6

Quarterfinals
ALT	(Germany) A Begemann (Argentina) N Todero	3	5
(United States) A Bogomolov Jr. (Canada) P Polansky	6	7
(Chile) P Capdeville (United States) E Nunez	w/o
(Colombia) A Falla (Colombia) A González
(Argentina) D Álvarez (Argentina) S Decoud	6	6
4	(Argentina) B Dabul (Argentina) E Schwank	3	4
(Brazil) R Mello (Brazil) C Zampieri	1	2
2	(Mexico) S González (United States) T Rettenmaier	6	6

Semifinals
(United States) A Bogomolov Jr. (Canada) P Polansky	4	6	[9]
(Colombia) A Falla (Colombia) A González	6	3	[11]
(Argentina) D Álvarez (Argentina) S Decoud	7	4	[11]
2	(Mexico) S González (United States) T Rettenmaier	6^{2}	6	[9]

Finals
(Colombia) A Falla (Colombia) A González	5	6	[10]
(Argentina) D Álvarez (Argentina) S Decoud	7	4	[8]
