= 2010 Copa Petrobras Bogotá – Singles =

Singles
- 2010 Copa Petrobras Bogotá

Final
- Champion: (Brazil) João Souza
- Runner-up: (Morocco) Reda El Amrani
- Score: 6–4, 7–6(5)

Events
Singles	Doubles
← 2009 ·	Copa Petrobras Bogotá	· 2011 →

Carlos Salamanca was the defending champion, but he was eliminated by unseeded Reda El Amrani in the quarterfinals. João Souza became the champion after defeating Reda El Amrani 6–4, 7–6(5) in the final.

== Seeds ==
1. (Paraguay) Ramón Delgado (quarterfinals)
2. (Brazil) João Souza (champion)
3. (Colombia) Carlos Salamanca (quarterfinals)
4. (Brazil) Marcos Daniel (semifinals)
5. (South Africa) Izak van der Merwe (quarterfinals)
6. (United States) Kevin Kim (first round)
7. (Germany) Andre Begemann (first round)
8. (Brazil) Caio Zampieri (first round)

== Draw ==
=== Key ===
- Q = Qualifier
- WC = Wild card
- LL = Lucky loser
- Alt = Alternate
- ITF = ITF entry
- PR = Protected ranking
- SR = Special ranking
- SE = Special exempt
- JE = Junior exempt
- JR = Junior Accelerator Programme entrant
- CO = College Accelerator Programme entrant
- NG = Next Gen Accelerator Program entrant
- w/o = Walkover
- r = Retired
- d = Defaulted

=== Finals ===
Semifinals
(Argentina) Sebastián Decoud	3	3
(Morocco) Reda El Amrani	6	6
4	(Brazil) Marcos Daniel	6^{4}	4
2	(Brazil) João Souza	7	6

Final
(Morocco) Reda El Amrani	4	6^{5}
2	(Brazil) João Souza	6	7

=== Top half ===
First round
1	(Paraguay) R Delgado	6	2	6
(Argentina) M Alund	3	6	2
Q	(Brazil) E Ribeiro Neto	6	6
ALT	(Argentina) P Galdón	3	2
(Italy) R Ghedin	6	6
WC	(Brazil) J Pereira	4	1
(Argentina) S Decoud	6	6^{4}	7
7	(Germany) A Begemann	3	7	6^{5}
3	(Colombia) C Salamanca	6	6
Q	(Germany) M Emmrich	2	0
PR	(Argentina) D Hartfield	2	r
SE	(Brazil) R Guidolin	6
(Argentina) F Bagnis	7	1	2
WC	(Colombia) JS Gómez	6^{8}	6	6
(Morocco) R El Amrani	4	6	6
6	(United States) K Kim	6	3	1

Second round
1	(Paraguay) R Delgado	6	6
Q	(Brazil) E Ribeiro Neto	4	4
(Italy) R Ghedin	6	6^{4}	6^{4}
(Argentina) S Decoud	2	7	7
3	(Colombia) C Salamanca	6	4	6
SE	(Brazil) R Guidolin	4	6	3
WC	(Colombia) JS Gómez	4	3
(Morocco) R El Amrani	6	6

Quarterfinals
1	(Paraguay) R Delgado	4	7	6^{4}
(Argentina) S Decoud	6	6^{2}	7
3	(Colombia) C Salamanca	4	6	4
(Morocco) R El Amrani	6	4	6

Semifinals
(Argentina) S Decoud	3
(Morocco) R El Amrani	6

=== Bottom half ===
First round
5	(South Africa) I van der Merwe	6	3	6
(Colombia) R Farah	3	6	2
Q	(Argentina) D Álvarez	6^{8}	3
(Brazil) R Dutra da Silva	7	6
(Dominican Republic) V Estrella	6	7
WC	(Colombia) S Serrano	2	6^{0}
Q	(Germany) G Kretschmer	3	1
4	(Brazil) M Daniel	6	6
8	(Brazil) C Zampieri	5	3
(Colombia) JS Cabal	7	6
(Chile) J Aguilar	3	3
(Brazil) J Silva	6	6
(Chile) P Capdeville	4	2
(Brazil) R Hocevar	6	6
WC	(Colombia) A González	3	2
2	(Brazil) J Souza	6	6

Second round
5	(South Africa) I van der Merwe	4	6	7
(Brazil) R Dutra da Silva	6	3	6^{7}
(Dominican Republic) V Estrella	4	3
4	(Brazil) M Daniel	6	6
(Colombia) JS Cabal	6	6
(Brazil) J Silva	2	4
(Brazil) R Hocevar	3	3
2	(Brazil) J Souza	6	6

Quarterfinals
5	(South Africa) I van der Merwe	6^{5}	4
4	(Brazil) M Daniel	7	6
(Colombia) JS Cabal	0	6^{5}
2	(Brazil) J Souza	6	7

Semifinals
4	(Brazil) M Daniel	6^{4}	4
2	(Brazil) J Souza	7	6
