= 2008 La Serena Open – Singles =

Singles
- 2008 La Serena Open

Final
- Champion: (Spain) Rubén Ramírez Hidalgo
- Runner-up: (Spain) David Marrero
- Score: 6–3, 6–1

Events
Singles	Doubles
- ATP Challenger La Serena

Mariano Zabaleta was the defending champion, but did not compete this year.

Rubén Ramírez Hidalgo won the title by defeating qualifier David Marrero 6–3, 6–1 in the final.

== Seeds ==
1. (Ecuador) Nicolás Lapentti (quarterfinals)
2. (Spain) Rubén Ramírez Hidalgo (champion)
3. (Argentina) Juan Pablo Guzmán (first round)
4. (Argentina) Brian Dabul (second round)
5. (Argentina) Eduardo Schwank (semifinals)
6. (Brazil) Thomaz Bellucci (first round)
7. (Chile) Adrián García (second round)
8. (Spain) Daniel Muñoz de la Nava (first round)

== Draw ==
Key

- Q = Qualifier
- WC = Wild card
- LL = Lucky loser
- Alt = Alternate
- ITF = ITF entry
- PR = Protected ranking
- SR = Special ranking
- SE = Special exempt
- JE = Junior exempt
- JR = Junior Accelerator Programme entrant
- CO = College Accelerator Programme entrant
- NG = Next Gen Accelerator Program entrant
- w/o = Walkover
- r = Retired
- d = Defaulted

=== Finals ===
Semifinals
Q	(Spain) David Marrero	5	7	6
(Greece) Vasilis Mazarakis	7	5	4
5	(Argentina) Eduardo Schwank	6	4	3
2	(Spain) Rubén Ramírez Hidalgo	2	6	6

Final
Q	(Spain) David Marrero	3	1
2	(Spain) Rubén Ramírez Hidalgo	6	6

=== Top half ===
First round
1/WC	(Ecuador) N Lapentti	6	6
(Argentina) JP Villar	1	4
(Italy) M Jorquera	1	3
WC	(Chile) H Podlipnik-Castillo	6	6
(Argentina) S Decoud	6^{4}	6	4
Q	(Spain) D Marrero	7^{7}	4	6
(Austria) R Eitzinger	6	4	2
7	(Chile) A García	4	6	6
4	(Argentina) B Dabul	6	1
(Argentina) G Marcaccio	2	0^{r}
Q	(Argentina) A Fabbri	4	6^{7}
(Greece) V Mazarakis	6	7^{9}
(Spain) JA Sánchez de Luna	7	6
(Brazil) C Zampieri	5	4
(Austria) A Haider-Maurer	6	3	7^{7}
6	(Brazil) T Bellucci	3	6	6^{5}

Second round
1/WC	(Ecuador) N Lapentti	6	6
WC	(Chile) H Podlipnik-Castillo	3	1
Q	(Spain) D Marrero	6	6^{3}	6
7	(Chile) A García	3	7^{7}	2
4	(Argentina) B Dabul	0	3
(Greece) V Mazarakis	6	6
(Spain) JA Sánchez de Luna	4	7	6
(Austria) A Haider-Maurer	6	5	3

Quarterfinals
1/WC	(Ecuador) N Lapentti	6	4	3
Q	(Spain) D Marrero	1	6	6
(Greece) V Mazarakis	6	6
(Spain) JA Sánchez de Luna	4	4

Semifinals
Q	(Spain) D Marrero	5	7	6
(Greece) V Mazarakis	7	5	4

=== Bottom half ===
First round
5	(Argentina) E Schwank	6	6
(Argentina) M Puerta	1	4
(Brazil) F Ferreiro	4
(Argentina) C Villagrán	1^{r}
(Spain) G Trujillo Soler	6	7
LL	(Argentina) A Kon	1	5
WC	(Chile) G Hormazábal	2	7^{7}	7
3	(Argentina) JP Guzmán	6	6^{2}	5
8	(Spain) D Muñoz de la Nava	6	5	6^{2}
Q	(Argentina) M Alund	3	7	7^{7}
(Argentina) JM Aranguren	3	6	7
(Argentina) D Junqueira	6	2	5
(Argentina) H Zeballos	4	7	4
(Spain) G Alcaide	6	5	6
Q	(Italy) M Marrai	2	3
2	(Spain) R Ramírez Hidalgo	6	6

Second round
5	(Argentina) E Schwank	6	6
(Brazil) F Ferreiro	3	3
(Spain) G Trujillo Soler	6	6^{5}	6
WC	(Chile) G Hormazábal	4	7^{7}	3
Q	(Argentina) M Alund	7^{8}	4	4
(Argentina) JM Aranguren	6^{6}	6	6
(Spain) G Alcaide	1	6	6^{2}
2	(Spain) R Ramírez Hidalgo	6	2	7^{7}

Quarterfinals
5	(Argentina) E Schwank	6	6
(Spain) G Trujillo Soler	1	1
(Argentina) JM Aranguren	4	1
2	(Spain) R Ramírez Hidalgo	6	6

Semifinals
5	(Argentina) E Schwank	6	4	3
2	(Spain) R Ramírez Hidalgo	2	6	6
