= 2008 La Serena Open – Doubles =

Doubles
- 2008 La Serena Open

Final
- Champions: (Ecuador) Nicolás Lapentti (Argentina) Eduardo Schwank
- Runners-up: (Argentina) Sebastián Decoud (Argentina) Cristian Villagrán
- Score: 6–4, 6–0

Events
Singles	Doubles
- ATP Challenger La Serena

Marc López and Simone Vagnozzi were the defending champions, but none competed this year.

Nicolás Lapentti and Eduardo Schwank won the title by defeating Sebastián Decoud and Cristian Villagrán 6–4, 6–0 in the final.

== Seeds ==
1. (Argentina) Juan Pablo Guzmán / (Spain) Rubén Ramírez Hidalgo (quarterfinals)
2. (Argentina) Brian Dabul / (Argentina) Horacio Zeballos (semifinals)
3. (Ecuador) Nicolás Lapentti / (Argentina) Eduardo Schwank (champions)
4. (Spain) Daniel Muñoz de la Nava / (Spain) Gabriel Trujillo Soler (semifinals)

== Draw ==
Key

- Q = Qualifier
- WC = Wild card
- LL = Lucky loser
- Alt = Alternate
- ITF = ITF entry
- PR = Protected ranking
- SR = Special ranking
- SE = Special exempt
- JE = Junior exempt
- JR = Junior Accelerator Programme entrant
- CO = College Accelerator Programme entrant
- NG = Next Gen Accelerator Program entrant
- w/o = Walkover
- r = Retired
- d = Defaulted

=== Draw ===
First round
1	(Argentina) JP Guzmán (Spain) R Ramírez Hidalgo	6	4	[10]
Alt	(Italy) M Marrai (Italy) W Trusendi	4	6	[4]
(Argentina) S Decoud (Argentina) C Villagrán	5	6	[10]
WC	(Chile) A García (Chile) R Urzúa	7	3	[5]
4	(Spain) D Muñoz de la Nava (Spain) G Trujillo Soler	7^{7}	6
(Spain) D Marrero (Spain) JA Sánchez de Luna	6^{4}	4
(Brazil) T Bellucci (Brazil) C Zampieri	0	6	[9]
(Argentina) A Fabbri (Argentina) JP Villar	6	4	[11]
(Argentina) JM Aranguren (Argentina) D Junqueira	3	4
WC	(Chile) G Hormazábal (Chile) H Podlipnik-Castillo	6	6
(Austria) R Eitzinger (Austria) A Haider-Maurer	3	1
3	(Ecuador) N Lapentti (Argentina) E Schwank	6	6
WC	(Chile) J Aguilar (Sweden) P Figueroa	0	6^{4}
(Argentina) M Alund (Serbia) D Savić	6	7^{7}
(Argentina) G Marcaccio (Argentina) E Massa	6	2	[8]
2	(Argentina) B Dabul (Argentina) H Zeballos	1	6	[10]

Quarterfinals
1	(Argentina) JP Guzmán (Spain) R Ramírez Hidalgo	6^{5}	6	[6]
(Argentina) S Decoud (Argentina) C Villagrán	7^{7}	1	[10]
4	(Spain) D Muñoz de la Nava (Spain) G Trujillo Soler	6	6
(Argentina) A Fabbri (Argentina) JP Villar	1	2
WC	(Chile) G Hormazábal (Chile) H Podlipnik-Castillo	5	3
3	(Ecuador) N Lapentti (Argentina) E Schwank	7	6
(Argentina) M Alund (Serbia) D Savić	4	1
2	(Argentina) B Dabul (Argentina) H Zeballos	6	6

Semifinals
(Argentina) S Decoud (Argentina) C Villagrán	6	4	[10]
4	(Spain) D Muñoz de la Nava (Spain) G Trujillo Soler	3	6	[7]
3	(Ecuador) N Lapentti (Argentina) E Schwank	7^{7}	4	[10]
2	(Argentina) B Dabul (Argentina) H Zeballos	6^{3}	6	[2]

Final
(Argentina) S Decoud (Argentina) C Villagrán	4	0
3	(Ecuador) N Lapentti (Argentina) E Schwank	6	6
