= 2009 Copa Petrobras Bogotá – Singles =

Singles
- 2009 Copa Petrobras Bogotá

Final
- Champion: (Colombia) Carlos Salamanca
- Runner-up: (Italy) Riccardo Ghedin
- Score: 6–1, 7–6(5)

Events
Singles	Doubles
← 2008 ·	Copa Petrobras Bogotá	· 2010 →

Marcos Daniel was the defender of title, but he chose to not participate this year.
Carlos Salamanca won in the final 6–1, 7–6(5), against Riccardo Ghedin.

== Seeds ==
1. (Argentina) Horacio Zeballos (first round)
2. (Chile) Paul Capdeville (quarterfinals)
3. (Colombia) Santiago Giraldo (second round)
4. (Argentina) Brian Dabul (first round)
5. (Argentina) Sergio Roitman (second round)
6. (Colombia) Alejandro Falla (first round)
7. (Argentina) Eduardo Schwank (second round)
8. (United States) Alex Bogomolov Jr. (second round)

== Draw ==
=== Key ===
- Q = Qualifier
- WC = Wild card
- LL = Lucky loser
- Alt = Alternate
- SE = Special exempt
- PR = Protected ranking
- ITF = ITF entry
- JE = Junior exempt
- w/o = Walkover
- r = Retired
- d = Defaulted
- SR = Special ranking

=== Final four ===
Semifinals
(Italy) Riccardo Ghedin	3	6	6
Q	(Brazil) Caio Zampieri	6	2	3
(Brazil) Ricardo Mello	4	1
(Colombia) Carlos Salamanca	6	6

Final
(Italy) Riccardo Ghedin	1	6^{5}
(Colombia) Carlos Salamanca	6	7

=== Top half ===
First round
1	(Argentina) H Zeballos	3	2
(Argentina) M Zabaleta	6	6
WC	(Colombia) S López	1	0
(Italy) R Ghedin	6	6
WC	(Colombia) E Struvay	6^{1}	2
WC	(Argentina) M Puerta	7	6
WC	(Colombia) A González	6	7
6	(Colombia) A Falla	0	6^{3}
3	(Colombia) S Giraldo	6	6
(Brazil) F Ferreiro	2	1
Q	(Brazil) C Zampieri	5	6	6
(France) V Millot	7	3	2
Q	(Germany) A Begemann	6	4	6
Q	(Argentina) N Todero	0	6	4
(Mexico) S González	1	4
7	(Argentina) E Schwank	6	6

Second round
(Argentina) M Zabaleta	3	2
(Italy) R Ghedin	6	6
WC	(Argentina) M Puerta	4	6	4
WC	(Colombia) A González	6	3	6
3	(Colombia) S Giraldo	4	4
Q	(Brazil) C Zampieri	6	6
Q	(Germany) A Begemann	6	2	7
7	(Argentina) E Schwank	3	6	6^{5}

Quarterfinals
(Italy) R Ghedin	7	6
WC	(Colombia) A González	6^{8}	3
Q	(Brazil) C Zampieri	7	2	6
Q	(Germany) A Begemann	6^{3}	6	4

Semifinals
(Italy) R Ghedin	3	6	6
Q	(Brazil) C Zampieri	6	2	3

=== Bottom half ===
First round
5	(Argentina) S Roitman	4	6	6
(Argentina) M Alund	6	3	1
(Canada) P Polansky	6^{3}	4
(Brazil) R Mello	7	6
(Ecuador) G Lapentti	6	6
(Spain) C Poch-Gradin	3	2
(Denmark) K Pless	6	6
4	(Argentina) B Dabul	4	3
8	(United States) A Bogomolov Jr.	6	6
Q	(Colombia) M Quintero	1	4
(Uruguay) M Felder	6^{5}	3
(Colombia) C Salamanca	7	6
(Argentina) S Decoud	7	3	1
(Argentina) F del Bonis	5	6	6
(Argentina) D Álvarez	3	4
2	(Chile) P Capdeville	6	6

Second round
5	(Argentina) S Roitman	7	4	5
(Brazil) R Mello	6^{3}	6	7
(Ecuador) G Lapentti	7	4	6
(Denmark) K Pless	5	6	4
8	(United States) A Bogomolov Jr.	3	5
(Colombia) C Salamanca	6	7
(Argentina) F del Bonis	3	4
2	(Chile) P Capdeville	6	6

Quarterfinals
(Brazil) R Mello	6	6
(Ecuador) G Lapentti	1	4
(Colombia) C Salamanca	6	6
2	(Chile) P Capdeville	3	1

Semifinals
(Brazil) R Mello	4	1
(Colombia) C Salamanca	6	6
