= 2009 Copa Petrobras Bogotá =

2009 Colombian tennis tournament

- Date: 21–27 September
- Edition: 6th
- Location: Bogotá, Colombia

Champions

Singles
- (Colombia) Carlos Salamanca

Doubles
- (Colombia) Alejandro Falla / (Colombia) Alejandro González
← 2008 ·	Copa Petrobras Bogotá	· 2010 →

The 2009 Copa Petrobras Bogotá was a professional tennis tournament played on outdoor clay courts. It was the sixth edition of the tournament, which was part of the 2009 ATP Challenger Tour. It took place in Bogotá, Colombia between 21 and 27 September 2009.

== Singles main draw entrants ==
=== Seeds ===
Country	Player	Rank^{1}	Seed
ARG	Horacio Zeballos	66	1
CHI	Paul Capdeville	84	2
COL	Santiago Giraldo	115	3
ARG	Brian Dabul	129	4
ARG	Sergio Roitman	130	5
COL	Alejandro Falla	143	6
ARG	Eduardo Schwank	156	7
USA	Alex Bogomolov Jr.	158	8

- Rankings are as of 14 September 2009.

=== Other entrants ===
The following players received wildcards into the singles main draw:

- (Colombia) Alejandro González
- (Colombia) Sebastián López
- (Argentina) Mariano Puerta
- (Colombia) Eduardo Struvay

The following players received entry from the qualifying draw:

- (Germany) Andre Begemann
- (Colombia) Michael Quintero
- (Argentina) Nicolás Todero
- (Brazil) Caio Zampieri

== Champions ==
=== Singles ===
(Colombia) Carlos Salamanca def. (Italy) Riccardo Ghedin, 6–1, 7–6(5)

=== Doubles ===
(Colombia) Alejandro Falla / (Colombia) Alejandro González def. (Argentina) Sebastián Decoud / (Argentina) Diego Álvarez, 5–7, 6–4, [10–8]
