= 2008 Roma Open – Doubles =

Doubles
- 2008 Roma Open

Final
- Champion: (Italy) Flavio Cipolla (Italy) Simone Vagnozzi
- Runner-up: (Italy) Paolo Lorenzi (Italy) Giancarlo Petrazzuolo
- Score: 6–3, 6–3

Events
Singles	Doubles
← 2007 ·	Roma Open	· 2009 →

Flavio Cipolla and Marcel Granollers were the defenders of championship title, but Granollers decided to not participate this year, he played in Barcelona with Nicolás Almagro.
Cipolla chose to play with Simone Vagnozzi, and won in the final 6–3, 6–3, against Paolo Lorenzi and Giancarlo Petrazzuolo.

== Seeds ==
1. (United States) Alex Kuznetsov / (Belgium) Dick Norman (first round)
2. (Romania) Florin Mergea / (Romania) Horia Tecău (semifinals)
3. (Italy) Flavio Cipolla / (Italy) Simone Vagnozzi (champions)
4. (Italy) Leonardo Azzaro / (Italy) Stefano Galvani (quarterfinals)

== Draw ==
=== Key ===
- Q = Qualifier
- WC = Wild card
- LL = Lucky loser
- Alt = Alternate
- SE = Special exempt
- PR = Protected ranking
- ITF = ITF entry
- JE = Junior exempt
- w/o = Walkover
- r = Retired
- d = Defaulted
- SR = Special ranking

=== Draw ===
First round
1	(United States) A Kuznetsov (Belgium) D Norman	6	3	[6]
(Chile) A García (Argentina) G Marcaccio	3	6	[10]
(Germany) S Greul (Serbia) D Savić	6	7
(Switzerland) M Lammer (Brazil) C Zampieri	1	5
4	(Italy) L Azzaro (Italy) S Galvani	6	6
WC	(Italy) Danilo Gargano (Italy) Federico Torresi	4	4
ALT	(Italy) Andrea Aloisi (Italy) Damiano di Ienno	4	2
(Italy) P Lorenzi (Italy) G Petrazzuolo	6	6
WC	(Italy) C Brandi (Italy) T Fabbiano	4	6	[3]
(United States) H Armando (Argentina) D Veronelli	6	4	[10]
WC	(Italy) A Biasella (Italy) M Dell'Acqua	2	2
3	(Italy) F Cipolla (Italy) S Vagnozzi	6	6
(Ukraine) A Dolgopolov (Ukraine) A Smirnov	6	3	[7]
(France) A Mannarino (France) T Oger	2	6	[10]
(Argentina) S Decoud (Argentina) C Villagrán	4	2
2	(Romania) F Mergea (Romania) H Tecău	6	6

Quarterfinals
(Chile) A García (Argentina) G Marcaccio	6	6
(Germany) S Greul (Serbia) D Savić	3	2
4	(Italy) L Azzaro (Italy) S Galvani	7	3	[3]
(Italy) P Lorenzi (Italy) G Petrazzuolo	5	6	[10]
(United States) H Armando (Argentina) D Veronelli	2	2
3	(Italy) F Cipolla (Italy) S Vagnozzi	6	6
(France) A Mannarino (France) T Oger	2	7	[5]
2	(Romania) F Mergea (Romania) H Tecău	6	6^{6}	[10]

Semifinals
(Chile) A García (Argentina) G Marcaccio	2	3
(Italy) P Lorenzi (Italy) G Petrazzuolo	6	6
3	(Italy) F Cipolla (Italy) S Vagnozzi	6	6
2	(Romania) F Mergea (Romania) H Tecău	3	1

Finals
(Italy) P Lorenzi (Italy) G Petrazzuolo	3	3
3	(Italy) F Cipolla (Italy) S Vagnozzi	6	6
