= Patricio Rudi =

Argentine tennis player

- Country (sports): Argentina
- Born: 16 December 1977 (age 47); Argentina
- Plays: Right-handed
- Prize money: $45,667

Singles
- Career record: 0–0
- Career titles: 0; 0 Challenger, 3 Futures
- Highest ranking: No. 367 (19 February 2001)

Doubles
- Career record: 0–0
- Career titles: 0; 1 Challenger, 17 Futures
- Highest ranking: No. 212 (22 April 2002)
- Last updated on: 28 April 2021.

Patricio Rudi (born 16 December 1977) is a retired Argentine professional tennis player. He had a career-high ATP singles ranking of world No. 367 achieved on 19 February 2001, and a career-high ATP doubles ranking of world No. 212 achieved on 22 April 2002. He never qualified for an ATP Tour main draw match, thus playing exclusively on the ATP Challenger Tour and ITF Futures Tour.

Rudi reached 3 career singles finals, posting a tally of 3 wins and 0 losses, all coming on the ITF Futures Tour. Additionally, he reached 27 career doubles finals with a record of 18 wins and 9 losses including a 1–2 record in ATP Challenger Tour finals. He won the 2003 Weiden ATP Challenger tournament held on clay courts in Germany alongside compatriot Mariano Delfino defeating Diego del Río and Tomas Tenconi by a score of 6–2, 4–6, 7–6^{(8–6)}.

== ATP Challenger and ITF Futures finals ==
=== Singles: 3 (3–0) ===
Legend ATP Challenger (0–0) ITF Futures (3–0)	Finals by surface Hard (0–0) Clay (3–0) Grass (0–0) Carpet (0–0)

Result	W–L	Date	Tournament	Tier	Surface	Opponent	Score
Win	1–0	Oct 2000	Bolivia F3, Santa Cruz	Futures	Clay	(Argentina) Patricio Arquez	6–1, 6–7^{(5–7)}, 7–6^{(7–3)}
Win	2–0	Dec 2000	Chile F9, Santiago	Futures	Clay	(Chile) Julio Peralta	3–6, 7–6^{(7–2)}, 6–0
Win	3–0	Nov 2002	Uruguay F2, Montevideo	Futures	Clay	(Argentina) Antonio Pastorino	7–5, 6–2

=== Doubles: 27 (18–9) ===
Legend ATP Challenger (1–2) ITF Futures (17–7)	Finals by surface Hard (0–1) Clay (18–8) Grass (0–0) Carpet (0–0)

Result	W–L	Date	Tournament	Tier	Surface	Partner	Opponents	Score
Win	1–0	Oct 1999	Paraguay F1, Asunción	Futures	Clay	(Argentina) Gustavo Marcaccio	(Argentina) Edgardo Massa (Argentina) Ignacio González King	6–3, 6–1
Win	2–0	May 2000	Argentina F6, Misiones	Futures	Clay	(Argentina) Leonardo Olguín	(Argentina) Sebastian Gutierrez (Argentina) Sebastian Uriarte	6–2, 6–4
Loss	2–1	Aug 2000	Argentina F9, Buenos Aires	Futures	Clay	(Argentina) Luciano Vitullo	(Argentina) Martin Stringari (Italy) Tomas Tenconi	2–4, 4–5^{(2)}, 1–4
Win	3–1	Aug 2000	Argentina F10, Buenos Aires	Futures	Clay	(Argentina) Gustavo Marcaccio	(Argentina) Diego Cristin (Argentina) Guillermo Carry	3–6, 6–1, 6–1
Win	4–1	Sep 2000	Peru F2, Lima	Futures	Clay	(Argentina) Gustavo Marcaccio	(Chile) Miguel Miranda (Chile) Juan-Felipe Yáñez	7–6^{(7–3)}, 0–6, 6–0
Win	5–1	Oct 2000	Bolivia F2, Cochabamba	Futures	Clay	(Argentina) Gustavo Marcaccio	(Argentina) Cristian Villagrán (Argentina) Rodolfo Daruich	6–1, 6–2
Loss	5–2	Oct 2000	Colombia F1, Bogotá	Futures	Clay	(Argentina) Gustavo Marcaccio	(Colombia) Rubén Torres (Ecuador) Giovanni Lapentti	5–7, 0–2 ret.
Win	6–2	Dec 2000	Chile F9, Santiago	Futures	Clay	(Argentina) Matias O'Neille	(Argentina) Martín Vassallo Argüello (Argentina) Diego Veronelli	6–4, 1–0 ret.
Loss	6–3	Mar 2001	Argentina F1, Mendoza	Futures	Clay	(Argentina) Ignacio González King	(Argentina) Martín Vassallo Argüello (Argentina) Diego Veronelli	3–6, 3–6
Loss	6–4	Apr 2001	Brazil F1, Rio de Janeiro	Futures	Clay	(Argentina) Gustavo Marcaccio	(Argentina) Enzo Artoni (Argentina) Juan Pablo Guzmán	6–4, 2–6, 1–6
Win	7–4	May 2001	Argentina F5, Córdoba	Futures	Clay	(Argentina) Mariano Delfino	(Argentina) Ignacio González King (Argentina) Diego Hartfield	7–6^{(7–5)}, 6–3
Win	8–4	May 2001	Argentina F6, Buenos Aires	Futures	Clay	(Argentina) Martín Vassallo Argüello	(Chile) Miguel Miranda (Chile) Juan-Felipe Yáñez	6–4, 6–4
Loss	8–5	Aug 2001	Brasília, Brazil	Challenger	Clay	(Argentina) Gustavo Marcaccio	(Argentina) Gastón Etlis (Argentina) Leonardo Olguín	4–6, 4–6
Win	9–5	Oct 2001	Brazil F6, Porto Alegre	Futures	Clay	(Peru) Iván Miranda	(Argentina) Damián Furmanski (Argentina) Cristian Kordasz	6–1, 6–4
Win	10–5	Oct 2001	Colombia F2, Bogotá	Futures	Clay	(Argentina) Gustavo Marcaccio	(Argentina) Damián Furmanski (Netherlands) Rogier Wassen	walkover
Loss	10–6	Mar 2002	Mexico F1, Chetumal	Futures	Hard	(Argentina) Gustavo Marcaccio	(Mexico) Bruno Echagaray (Mexico) Santiago González	6–1, 1–6, 0–6
Win	11–6	Jun 2003	Weiden, Germany	Challenger	Clay	(Argentina) Mariano Delfino	(Argentina) Diego del Río (Italy) Tomas Tenconi	6–2, 4–6, 7–6^{(8–6)}
Win	12–6	Sep 2003	Argentina F3, Buenos Aires	Futures	Clay	(Argentina) Gustavo Marcaccio	(Argentina) Brian Dabul (Argentina) Carlos Berlocq	5–7, 6–4, 6–3
Win	13–6	Oct 2003	Chile F4, Santiago	Futures	Clay	(Argentina) Diego Hartfield	(Argentina) Edgardo Massa (Argentina) Diego Junqueira	6–2, 2–6, 7–6^{(7–4)}
Win	14–6	Nov 2003	Uruguay F1, Montevideo	Futures	Clay	(Argentina) Gustavo Marcaccio	(Argentina) Diego Hartfield (Argentina) Sebastián Decoud	6–4, 6–4
Loss	14–7	Jun 2004	Weiden, Germany	Challenger	Clay	(Argentina) Mariano Delfino	(Serbia and Montenegro) Janko Tipsarević (Croatia) Lovro Zovko	4–6, 6–7^{(6–8)}
Win	15–7	Aug 2004	Chile F1A, Santiago	Futures	Clay	(Argentina) Juan-Martín Aranguren	(Argentina) Diego Junqueira (Argentina) Rodolfo Daruich	1–6, 6–3, 6–3
Win	16–7	Aug 2004	Chile F1B, Santiago	Futures	Clay	(Argentina) Damián Patriarca	(Chile) Miguel Miranda (Chile) Hermes Gamonal	7–6^{(7–4)}, 7–5
Loss	16–8	Nov 2004	Chile F3, Santiago	Futures	Clay	(Chile) Juan-Felipe Yáñez	(Argentina) Lionel Noviski (Argentina) Damián Patriarca	walkover
Win	17–8	Nov 2004	Argentina F7, Rosario	Futures	Clay	(Argentina) Emiliano Redondi	(Argentina) Francisco Cabello (Argentina) Máximo González	3–6, 6–4, 7–6^{(7–2)}
Loss	17–9	Apr 2005	Chile F1, Santiago	Futures	Clay	(Argentina) Juan-Martín Aranguren	(Argentina) Brian Dabul (Argentina) Damián Patriarca	2–6, 6–4, 2–6
Win	18–9	Nov 2005	Chile F5, Santiago	Futures	Clay	(Argentina) Emiliano Redondi	(Brazil) Thomaz Bellucci (Poland) Filip Urban	7–6^{(7–1)}, 6–3
