= 2008 La Serena Open =

- Date: 14 – 20 January
- Edition: 3rd
- Category: ATP Challenger Series
- Draw: 32S/32Q/16D
- Prize money: USD50,000
- Surface: Clay / outdoor
- Location: La Serena, Chile
- Venue: La Serena Golf resort

Champions

Singles
- (Spain) Rubén Ramírez Hidalgo

Doubles
- (Ecuador) Nicolás Lapentti / (Argentina) Eduardo Schwank
- ATP Challenger La Serena

The 2008 La Serena Open was a men's tennis tournament played on outdoor clay courts. It was the 3rd and final edition of the event, and part of the 2008 ATP Challenger Series of the 2008 ATP Tour. It took place at the tennis courts at the La Serena Golf resort in La Serena, Chile, from 14 through 20 January 2008.

The highlight of the tournament was the presence of Argentinian Mariano Puerta, former French Open runner-up in 2005, who returned to tennis in June 2007 after a 2-year ban due to doping. A temporary court with a capacity of 1,500 was specially built for the tournament.

== Points and prize money ==
=== Point distribution ===
Event	W	F	SF	QF	Round of 16	Round of 32	Q	Q3	Q2	Q1
Singles	55	38	24	13	5	0	—N/a			
Doubles	55	38	24	13	0	—N/a				

=== Prize money ===
Event	W	F	SF	QF	Round of 16	Round of 32	Q3	Q2	Q1
Singles	$7,200	$4,240	$2,510	$1,460	$860	$520	—N/a		
Doubles *	$3,100	$1,800	$1,080	$640	$360	—N/a			

_{* per team}

== Singles main draw entrants ==
=== Seeds ===
Country	Player	Rank^{1}	Seed
ECU	Nicolás Lapentti	110	1
ESP	Rubén Ramírez Hidalgo	134	2
ARG	Juan Pablo Guzmán	151	3
ARG	Brian Dabul	156	4
ARG	Eduardo Schwank	171	5
BRA	Thomaz Bellucci	183	6
CHI	Adrián García	187	7
ESP	Daniel Muñoz de la Nava	198	8

^{1} Rankings as of 7 January 2008.

=== Other entrants ===
The following players received wildcards into the singles main draw:

- (Chile) Guillermo Hormazábal
- (Ecuador) Nicolás Lapentti
- (Chile) Hans Podlipnik-Castillo

The following players received entry from the qualifying draw:

- (Argentina) Martín Alund
- (Argentina) Alejandro Fabbri
- (Italy) Matteo Marrai
- (Spain) David Marrero

The following player received entry as lucky loser:

- (Argentina) Alejandro Kon

=== Withdrawals ===
Before the tournament

- (Argentina) Edgardo Massa → replaced by Kon

=== Retirements ===
- (Argentina) Gustavo Marcaccio
- (Argentina) Cristian Villagrán

== Doubles main draw entrants ==
=== Seeds ===
Country	Player	Country	Player	Rank^{1}	Seed
ARG	Juan Pablo Guzmán	ESP	Rubén Ramírez Hidalgo	160	1
ARG	Brian Dabul	ARG	Horacio Zeballos	175	2
ECU	Nicolás Lapentti	ARG	Eduardo Schwank	471	3
ESP	Daniel Muñoz de la Nava	ESP	Gabriel Trujillo Soler	472	4

^{1} Rankings as of 7 January 2008.

=== Other entrants ===
The following pairs received wildcards into the doubles main draw:

- (Chile) Jorge Aguilar / (Sweden) Pablo Figueroa
- (Chile) Adrián García / (Chile) Rodrigo Urzúa
- (Chile) Guillermo Hormazábal / (Chile) Hans Podlipnik-Castillo

The following pair received entry as alternates:

- (Italy) Matteo Marrai / (Italy) Walter Trusendi

=== Withdrawals ===
Before the tournament

- (Brazil) Franco Ferreiro / (Italy) Manuel Jorquera → replaced by Marrai/Trusendi

== Champions ==
=== Singles ===
- (Spain) Rubén Ramírez Hidalgo defeated (Spain) David Marrero, 6–3, 6–1

It was the 5th Challenger title for Ramírez Hidalgo in his singles career.

=== Doubles ===
- (Ecuador) Nicolás Lapentti / (Argentina) Eduardo Schwank defeated (Argentina) Sebastián Decoud / (Argentina) Cristian Villagrán, 6–4, 6–0
