= 2001 Copa AT&T – Doubles =

Doubles
- 2001 Copa AT&T

Final
- Champions: (Argentina) Lucas Arnold (Spain) Tomás Carbonell
- Runners-up: (Argentina) Mariano Hood (Argentina) Sebastián Prieto
- Score: 5–7, 7–5, 7–6^{(7–5)}

Events
Singles	Doubles
← 2000 ·	ATP Buenos Aires	· 2002 →

Lucas Arnold and Tomás Carbonell won in the final 5–7, 7–5, 7–6^{(7–5)} against Mariano Hood and Sebastián Prieto.

== Seeds ==
1. (Argentina) Pablo Albano / (Brazil) Jaime Oncins (first round)
2. (Argentina) Lucas Arnold / (Spain) Tomás Carbonell (champions)
3. (Argentina) Gastón Etlis / (Argentina) Martín Rodríguez (semifinals)
4. (Italy) Cristian Brandi / (Argentina) Daniel Orsanic (semifinals)

== Draw ==
=== Key ===
- Q = Qualifier
- WC = Wild card
- LL = Lucky loser
- Alt = Alternate
- ITF = ITF entry
- PR = Protected ranking
- SR = Special ranking
- SE = Special exempt
- JE = Junior exempt
- JR = Junior Accelerator Programme entrant
- CO = College Accelerator Programme entrant
- NG = Next Gen Accelerator Program entrant
- w/o = Walkover
- r = Retired
- d = Defaulted

First round
1	(Argentina) P Albano (Brazil) J Oncins	6^{8}	7	3
(Spain) Á López Morón (Spain) A Portas	7^{10}	5	6
(Argentina) S Roitman (Italy) A Schneiter	2	7	2
(Argentina) M Hood (Argentina) S Prieto	6	5	6
3	(Argentina) G Etlis (Argentina) M Rodríguez	6	6^{8}	7^{7}
(Sweden) S Aspelin (Spain) Á Calatrava	4	7^{10}	6^{2}
(United States) D Johnson (Brazil) G Kuerten	7^{7}	6
(Spain) G Puentes (Spain) J Velasco Jr.	6^{5}	4
(Brazil) A Prieto (Israel) E Ran	6	3	7^{8}
WC	(Argentina) L Lobo (Chile) M Ríos	4	6	6^{6}
Q	(Argentina) D del Río (Argentina) L Olguín	6	2	2
4	(Italy) C Brandi (Argentina) D Orsanic	3	6	6
(Czech Republic) P Kovačka (Czech Republic) P Kudrnáč	6^{2}	7^{7}	5
WC	(Argentina) M García (Argentina) F Squillari	7^{7}	6^{5}	7
WC	(Argentina) J Acasuso (Argentina) E Massa	3	6^{6}
2	(Argentina) L Arnold (Spain) T Carbonell	6	7^{8}

Quarterfinals
(Spain) Á López Morón (Spain) A Portas	6^{5}	1
(Argentina) M Hood (Argentina) S Prieto	7^{7}	6
3	(Argentina) G Etlis (Argentina) M Rodríguez	6	6
(United States) D Johnson (Brazil) G Kuerten	3	4
(Brazil) A Prieto (Israel) E Ran	2	5
4	(Italy) C Brandi (Argentina) D Orsanic	6	7
WC	(Argentina) M García (Argentina) F Squillari	4	1
2	(Argentina) L Arnold (Spain) T Carbonell	6	6

Semifinals
(Argentina) M Hood (Argentina) S Prieto	6	7^{9}
3	(Argentina) G Etlis (Argentina) M Rodríguez	4	6^{7}
4	(Italy) C Brandi (Argentina) D Orsanic	3	2
2	(Argentina) L Arnold (Spain) T Carbonell	6	6

Final
(Argentina) M Hood (Argentina) S Prieto	7	5	6^{5}
2	(Argentina) L Arnold (Spain) T Carbonell	5	7	7^{7}
