= 2002 Copa AT&T – Doubles =

Doubles
- 2002 Copa AT&T

Final
- Champions: (Argentina) Gastón Etlis (Argentina) Martín Rodríguez
- Runners-up: (Sweden) Simon Aspelin (Australia) Andrew Kratzmann
- Score: 3–6, 6–3, [10–4]

Events
Singles	Doubles
← 2001 ·	ATP Buenos Aires	· 2003 →

Lucas Arnold and Tomás Carbonell were the defending champions but only Arnold competed that year with Luis Lobo.

Arnold and Lobo lost in the first round to Gastón Etlis and Martín Rodríguez.

Etlis and Rodríguez won in the final 3–6, 6–3, [10–4] against Simon Aspelin and Andrew Kratzmann.

== Seeds ==
1. (Sweden) Simon Aspelin / (Australia) Andrew Kratzmann (final)
2. (Argentina) Daniel Orsanic / (Argentina) Sebastián Prieto (quarterfinals)
3. (Argentina) Lucas Arnold / (Argentina) Luis Lobo (first round)
4. (Sweden) Johan Landsberg / (United States) Jim Thomas (semifinals)

== Draw ==
=== Key ===
- Q = Qualifier
- WC = Wild card
- LL = Lucky loser
- Alt = Alternate
- ITF = ITF entry
- PR = Protected ranking
- SR = Special ranking
- SE = Special exempt
- JE = Junior exempt
- JR = Junior Accelerator Programme entrant
- CO = College Accelerator Programme entrant
- NG = Next Gen Accelerator Program entrant
- w/o = Walkover
- r = Retired
- d = Defaulted

First round
1	(Sweden) S Aspelin (Australia) A Kratzmann	7^{9}	7^{7}
(Argentina) S Roitman (Italy) A Schneiter	6^{7}	6^{3}
(Australia) P Hanley (Australia) N Healey	7	7
(Argentina) G Cañas (Argentina) M García	5	5
4	(Sweden) J Landsberg (United States) J Thomas	2	6	[10]
(Spain) A Portas (Spain) F Vicente	6	3	[8]
WC	(Argentina) D Veronelli (Argentina) M Zabaleta	6	7^{7}
WC	(Argentina) J Acasuso (Argentina) A Calleri	4	6^{4}
ALT	(Argentina) F Cabello (Peru) L Horna	5	7	[8]
(United States) D Bowen (Australia) A Fisher	7	5	[10]
(Argentina) G Etlis (Argentina) M Rodríguez	7^{7}	6
3	(Argentina) L Arnold (Argentina) L Lobo	6^{4}	3
(Argentina) M Hood (Australia) J Kerr	1	3
WC	(Argentina) E Massa (Argentina) D Nalbandian	6	6
(Italy) E Artoni (Brazil) D Melo	6^{0}	6	[7]
2	(Argentina) D Orsanic (Argentina) S Prieto	7^{7}	3	[10]

Quarterfinals
1	(Sweden) S Aspelin (Australia) A Kratzmann	3	6	[10]
(Australia) P Hanley (Australia) N Healey	6	3	[6]
4	(Sweden) J Landsberg (United States) J Thomas	w/o
WC	(Argentina) D Veronelli (Argentina) M Zabaleta
(United States) D Bowen (Australia) A Fisher	4	2
(Argentina) G Etlis (Argentina) M Rodríguez	6	6
WC	(Argentina) E Massa (Argentina) D Nalbandian	6	6
2	(Argentina) D Orsanic (Argentina) S Prieto	4	4

Semifinals
1	(Sweden) S Aspelin (Australia) A Kratzmann	3	6	[10]
4	(Sweden) J Landsberg (United States) J Thomas	6	1	[5]
(Argentina) G Etlis (Argentina) M Rodríguez	5	6	[10]
WC	(Argentina) E Massa (Argentina) D Nalbandian	7	2	[8]

Final
1	(Sweden) S Aspelin (Australia) A Kratzmann	6	3	[4]
(Argentina) G Etlis (Argentina) M Rodríguez	3	6	[10]
