= 2002 Copa AT&T – Singles =

Singles
- 2002 Copa AT&T

Final
- Champion: (Chile) Nicolás Massú
- Runner-up: (Argentina) Agustín Calleri
- Score: 2–6, 7–6^{(7–5)}, 6–2

Details
- Draw: 32 (3WC/4Q/1LL/2SE)
- Seeds: 8

Events
Singles	Doubles
- ATP Buenos Aires

Gustavo Kuerten was the defending champion but lost in the first round to Agustín Calleri.

Nicolás Massú won in the final 2–6, 7–6^{(7–5)}, 6–2 against Calleri.

== Seeds ==
1. (Brazil) Gustavo Kuerten (first round)
2. (Argentina) Guillermo Cañas (first round)
3. (Ecuador) Nicolás Lapentti (second round)
4. (Spain) Albert Portas (first round)
5. (Spain) Félix Mantilla (second round)
6. (Spain) Alberto Martín (second round)
7. (Chile) Marcelo Ríos (second round)
8. (Argentina) ~~Gastón Gaudio~~ (withdrew because of a back injury)

== Draw ==
Key

- Q = Qualifier
- WC = Wild card
- LL = Lucky loser
- Alt = Alternate
- ITF = ITF entry
- PR = Protected ranking
- SR = Special ranking
- SE = Special exempt
- JE = Junior exempt
- JR = Junior Accelerator Programme entrant
- CO = College Accelerator Programme entrant
- NG = Next Gen Accelerator Program entrant
- w/o = Walkover
- r = Retired
- d = Defaulted

=== Finals ===
Semifinals
(Argentina) Agustín Calleri	6	6
(Argentina) Juan Ignacio Chela	4	4
Q	(Spain) Feliciano López	6^{2}	2
SE	(Chile) Nicolás Massú	7^{7}	6

Final
(Argentina) Agustín Calleri	6	6^{5}	2
SE	(Chile) Nicolás Massú	2	7^{7}	6

=== Top half ===
First round
1	(Brazil) G Kuerten	3	7^{7}	6^{4}
(Argentina) A Calleri	6	6^{5}	7^{7}
(United States) M Russell	3	0
(Brazil) F Meligeni	6	6
(Argentina) M Zabaleta	6^{2}	7	6
LL	(United States) H Armando	7^{7}	5	3
WC	(Argentina) E Massa	6	4	5
7	(Chile) M Ríos	4	6	7
3	(Ecuador) N Lapentti	4	6	6
Q	(Argentina) L Olguín	6	1	3
(Argentina) J I Chela	6	6
(Sweden) M Norman	3	2
(Argentina) F Squillari	6	6
Q	(Argentina) S Prieto	1	2
WC	(Argentina) M Puerta	6^{5}	1
6	(Spain) A Martín	7^{7}	6

Second round
(Argentina) A Calleri	5	6	6
(Brazil) F Meligeni	7	3	3
(Argentina) M Zabaleta	7^{7}	1	6
7	(Chile) M Ríos	6^{4}	6	3
3	(Ecuador) N Lapentti	6	0	6^{1}
(Argentina) J I Chela	3	6	7^{7}
(Argentina) F Squillari	6	3
6	(Spain) A Martín	1	1^{r}

Quarterfinals
(Argentina) A Calleri	6	4	6
(Argentina) M Zabaleta	4	6	1
(Argentina) J I Chela	7^{7}	4	6
(Argentina) F Squillari	6^{4}	6	4

Semifinals
(Argentina) A Calleri	6	6
(Argentina) J I Chela	4	4

=== Bottom half ===
First round
5	(Spain) F Mantilla	7^{9}	7^{7}
(Spain) F Vicente	6^{7}	6^{3}
Q	(Spain) F López	3	6	6
Q	(Peru) L Horna	6	4	3
(Italy) A Gaudenzi	6	4	6
(Austria) M Hipfl	3	6	4
(Argentina) J Acasuso	6	6
4	(Spain) A Portas	3	4
(Argentina) D Nalbandian	6	6
(Spain) A Montañés	2	4
SE	(Chile) F González	7	2
(Spain) G Blanco	5	1^{r}
SE	(Chile) N Massú	6	6
WC	(Argentina) G Etlis	1	4
(Spain) D Sánchez	6	6
2	(Argentina) G Cañas	2	3

Second round
5	(Spain) F Mantilla	3	6	3
Q	(Spain) F López	6	3	6
(Italy) A Gaudenzi	4	4
(Argentina) J Acasuso	6	6
(Argentina) D Nalbandian	6	1	7^{7}
SE	(Chile) F González	3	6	6^{5}
SE	(Chile) N Massú	6	6
(Spain) D Sánchez	4	3

Quarterfinals
Q	(Spain) F López	6	4	7
(Argentina) J Acasuso	3	6	5
(Argentina) D Nalbandian	6^{2}	6	6^{2}
SE	(Chile) N Massú	7^{7}	4	7^{7}

Semifinals
Q	(Spain) F López	6^{2}	2
SE	(Chile) N Massú	7^{7}	6

== Qualifying ==
=== Qualifying seeds ===
1. (Hungary) Attila Sávolt (first round)
2. (Spain) Jacobo Díaz (first round)
3. (Spain) Sergi Bruguera (first round)
4. (Brazil) Alexandre Simoni (first round)
5. (United States) Hugo Armando (qualifying competition, lucky loser)
6. (Spain) Marc López (qualifying competition)
7. (Brazil) Ricardo Mello (first round)
8. (Peru) Luis Horna (qualified)

=== Qualifiers ===
1. (Argentina) Leonardo Olguín
2. (Argentina) Sebastián Prieto
3. (Spain) Feliciano López
4. (Peru) Luis Horna

=== Lucky loser ===
1. (United States) Hugo Armando

=== Special exempts ===
1. (Chile) Fernando González (was still competing at Viña del Mar)
2. (Chile) Nicolás Massú (was still competing at Viña del Mar)

=== Qualifying draw ===
==== First qualifier ====
First round
1	(Hungary) Attila Sávolt	2	3
(Argentina) Mariano Delfino	6	6
(Argentina) Juan Pablo Guzmán	6^{2}	2
(Argentina) Cristian Kordasz	7^{7}	6
(Costa Rica) Juan Antonio Marín	3	4
(Italy) Filippo Volandri	6	6
(Argentina) Leonardo Olguín	7	6
7	(Brazil) Ricardo Mello	5	4

Second round
(Argentina) Mariano Delfino	7^{7}	6
(Argentina) Cristian Kordasz	6^{3}	4
(Italy) Filippo Volandri	4	6	3
(Argentina) Leonardo Olguín	6	4	6

Qualifying competition
(Argentina) Mariano Delfino	3	5
(Argentina) Leonardo Olguín	6	7

==== Second qualifier ====
First round
2	(Spain) Jacobo Díaz	6^{4}	2
(Argentina) Sebastián Prieto	7^{7}	6
(Argentina) Ignacio Hirigoyen	4	4
(Argentina) Federico Browne	6	6
(Spain) Óscar Serrano	6	6
(Argentina) Martín Vassallo Argüello	1	4
(Brazil) Daniel Melo	5	4
6	(Spain) Marc López	7	6

Second round
(Argentina) Sebastián Prieto	6	7
(Argentina) Federico Browne	4	5
(Spain) Óscar Serrano	6	6^{5}	6^{1}
6	(Spain) Marc López	3	7^{7}	7^{7}

Qualifying competition
(Argentina) Sebastián Prieto	7^{7}	6
6	(Spain) Marc López	6^{2}	2

==== Third qualifier ====
First round
3	(Spain) Sergi Bruguera	6	3	2
(Spain) Feliciano López	2	6	6
(Argentina) Diego Moyano	7^{7}	3	7
(Spain) Óscar Hernández	6^{5}	6	5
(Brazil) Júlio Silva	7^{7}	7^{7}
(Argentina) Patricio Arquez	6^{4}	6^{2}
(Spain) Diego Hipperdinger	3	3
5	(United States) Hugo Armando	6	6

Second round
(Spain) Feliciano López	7^{8}	6^{1}	6
(Argentina) Diego Moyano	6^{6}	7^{7}	4
(Brazil) Júlio Silva	5	1
5	(United States) Hugo Armando	7	6

Qualifying competition
(Spain) Feliciano López	6	6
5	(United States) Hugo Armando	4	4

==== Fourth qualifier ====
First round
4	(Brazil) Alexandre Simoni	4	1
(Spain) Germán Puentes	6	6
(Argentina) Luciano Vitullo	4	5
(Brazil) Marcos Daniel	6	7
(Spain) Gorka Fraile	1	7^{7}	4
(Argentina) Diego Veronelli	6	6^{1}	6
(Argentina) Sergio Roitman	4	2
8	(Peru) Luis Horna	6	6

Second round
(Spain) Germán Puentes	6^{2}	6	5
(Brazil) Marcos Daniel	7^{7}	4	7
(Argentina) Diego Veronelli	3	5
8	(Peru) Luis Horna	6	7

Qualifying competition
(Brazil) Marcos Daniel	1	1^{r}
8	(Peru) Luis Horna	6	2
