= 2010 Copa Petrobras Bogotá – Doubles =

Doubles
- 2010 Copa Petrobras Bogotá

Final
- Champions: (Brazil) Franco Ferreiro (Brazil) André Sá
- Runners-up: (Germany) Gero Kretschmer (Germany) Alex Satschko
- Score: 7–6(6), 6–4

Events
Singles	Doubles
- Copa Petrobras Bogotá

Alejandro Falla and Alejandro González were the defending champions, but Falla decided not to participate this year.
As a result, González partnered with Rodrigo Guidolin. They were eliminated by Marcos Daniel and João Souza already in the first round.
Franco Ferreiro and André Sá defeated Gero Kretschmer and Alex Satschko 7–6(6), 6–4 in the final.

== Seeds ==
1. (Brazil) Franco Ferreiro / (Brazil) André Sá (champions)
2. (Germany) Andre Begemann / (Germany) Martin Emmrich (first round)
3. (Colombia) Alejandro González / (Brazil) Rodrigo Guidolin (first round)
4. (Brazil) Ricardo Hocevar / (Brazil) Caio Zampieri (quarterfinals, withdrew)

== Draw ==
Key

- Q = Qualifier
- WC = Wild card
- LL = Lucky loser
- Alt = Alternate
- ITF = ITF entry
- PR = Protected ranking
- SR = Special ranking
- SE = Special exempt
- JE = Junior exempt
- JR = Junior Accelerator Programme entrant
- CO = College Accelerator Programme entrant
- NG = Next Gen Accelerator Program entrant
- w/o = Walkover
- r = Retired
- d = Defaulted

=== Draw ===
First round
1	(Brazil) F Ferreiro (Brazil) A Sá	7	7
(Chile) P Capdeville (Colombia) C Salamanca	5	6^{6}
(Colombia) JS Cabal (Colombia) R Farah	6	6
(Argentina) S Decoud (Dominican Republic) V Estrella	3	4
3	(Colombia) A González (Brazil) R Guidolin	1	6^{4}
(Brazil) M Daniel (Brazil) J Souza	6	7
WC	(Brazil) T Lopes (Brazil) J Pereira	4	5
(Brazil) R Dutra da Silva (Brazil) J Silva	6	7
WC	(Colombia) S López (Colombia) F Mantilla	3	2
(United States) JP Fruttero (South Africa) I van der Merwe	6	6
(Chile) J Aguilar (Argentina) M Alund	7	4	[3]
4	(Brazil) R Hocevar (Brazil) C Zampieri	6^{9}	6	[10]
(Germany) G Kretschmer (Germany) A Satschko	6	6
WC	(United States) S Barnett (United States) K Kim	4	3
ALT	(United States) E Nunez (Switzerland) A Sadecky	4	7	[10]
2	(Germany) A Begemann (Germany) M Emmrich	6	6^{5}	[6]

Quarterfinals
1	(Brazil) F Ferreiro (Brazil) A Sá	7	6
(Colombia) JS Cabal (Colombia) R Farah	6^{4}	3
(Brazil) M Daniel (Brazil) J Souza	6	7
(Brazil) R Dutra da Silva (Brazil) J Silva	2	6^{2}
(United States) JP Fruttero (South Africa) I van der Merwe
4	(Brazil) R Hocevar (Brazil) C Zampieri	w/o
(Germany) G Kretschmer (Germany) A Satschko	6	6
ALT	(United States) E Nunez (Switzerland) A Sadecky	3	3

Semifinals
1	(Brazil) F Ferreiro (Brazil) A Sá	7	7
(Brazil) M Daniel (Brazil) J Souza	5	5
(United States) JP Fruttero (South Africa) I van der Merwe	4	6^{5}
(Germany) G Kretschmer (Germany) A Satschko	6	7

Final
1	(Brazil) F Ferreiro (Brazil) A Sá	7	6
(Germany) G Kretschmer (Germany) A Satschko	6^{6}	4
