= 2001 Copa AT&T – Singles =

Singles
- 2001 Copa AT&T

Final
- Champion: (Brazil) Gustavo Kuerten
- Runner-up: (Argentina) José Acasuso
- Score: 6–1, 6–3

Events
Singles	Doubles
← 2000 ·	ATP Buenos Aires	· 2002 →

Gustavo Kuerten won in the final 6–1, 6–3 against José Acasuso.

== Seeds ==
1. (Brazil) Gustavo Kuerten (champion)
2. (Argentina) Franco Squillari (quarterfinals)
3. (Chile) Marcelo Ríos (first round)
4. (Argentina) Gastón Gaudio (semifinals)
5. (Spain) Fernando Vicente (semifinals)
6. (Spain) Francisco Clavet (first round)
7. (Morocco) Hicham Arazi (first round)
8. (Spain) Álex Calatrava (first round)

== Draw ==
=== Key ===
- Q = Qualifier
- WC = Wild card
- LL = Lucky loser
- Alt = Alternate
- ITF = ITF entry
- PR = Protected ranking
- SR = Special ranking
- SE = Special exempt
- JE = Junior exempt
- JR = Junior Accelerator Programme entrant
- CO = College Accelerator Programme entrant
- NG = Next Gen Accelerator Program entrant
- w/o = Walkover
- r = Retired
- d = Defaulted

=== Finals ===
Semifinals
1	(Brazil) Gustavo Kuerten	4	6	6
5	(Spain) Fernando Vicente	6	2	2
4	(Argentina) Gastón Gaudio	6	1	3
Q	(Argentina) José Acasuso	3	6	6

Final
1	(Brazil) Gustavo Kuerten	6	6
Q	(Argentina) José Acasuso	1	3

=== Top half ===
First round
1	(Brazil) G Kuerten	6	7^{7}
(Australia) R Fromberg	2	6^{3}
(Czech Republic) J Vaněk	6	6
(Spain) G Puentes	4	4
(Chile) N Massú	3	1
WC	(Argentina) H Gumy	6	6
WC	(Argentina) G Cañas	6^{1}	7	7^{7}
6	(Spain) F Clavet	7^{7}	5	6^{5}
3	(Chile) M Ríos	3	1
Q	(Austria) M Hipfl	6	6
(Germany) D Elsner	1	1
(Spain) A Martín	6	6
(Belgium) C Rochus	4	3
Q	(Spain) T Robredo	6	6
WC	(Argentina) D Nalbandian	6	5	6^{5}
5	(Spain) F Vicente	4	7	7^{7}

Second round
1	(Brazil) G Kuerten	6	6
(Czech Republic) J Vaněk	2	4
WC	(Argentina) H Gumy	5	6^{3}
WC	(Argentina) G Cañas	7	7^{7}
Q	(Austria) M Hipfl	7	6
(Spain) A Martín	5	1
Q	(Spain) T Robredo	5	6	6^{4}
5	(Spain) F Vicente	7	4	7^{7}

Quarterfinals
1	(Brazil) G Kuerten	0	6	6
WC	(Argentina) G Cañas	6	1	2
Q	(Austria) M Hipfl	4	r
5	(Spain) F Vicente	6

Semifinals
1	(Brazil) G Kuerten	4	6	6
5	(Spain) F Vicente	6	2	2

=== Bottom half ===
First round
8	(Spain) Á Calatrava	2	7^{7}	5
(Argentina) G Coria	6	6^{4}	7
Q	(Brazil) F Meligeni	7	6
(Morocco) K Alami	5	4
(Spain) D Sánchez	1	4
(Spain) S Bruguera	6	6
(Argentina) M Zabaleta	4	3
4	(Argentina) G Gaudio	6	6
7	(Morocco) H Arazi	6	6^{3}	4
Q	(Argentina) J Acasuso	2	7^{7}	6
(France) A di Pasquale	4	6^{6}
(Spain) A Portas	6	7^{8}
(Argentina) J I Chela	6	6
(Morocco) Y El Aynaoui	2	4
(Argentina) A Calleri	4	6	5
2	(Argentina) F Squillari	6	3	7

Second round
(Argentina) G Coria	1	6	6
Q	(Brazil) F Meligeni	6	3	4
(Spain) S Bruguera	2	4
4	(Argentina) G Gaudio	6	6
Q	(Argentina) J Acasuso	6	7
(Spain) A Portas	4	5
(Argentina) J I Chela	6^{5}	6	5
2	(Argentina) F Squillari	7^{7}	3	7

Quarterfinals
(Argentina) G Coria	3	6^{6}
4	(Argentina) G Gaudio	6	7^{8}
Q	(Argentina) J Acasuso	6^{3}	6	6
2	(Argentina) F Squillari	7^{7}	4	4

Semifinals
4	(Argentina) G Gaudio	6	1	3
Q	(Argentina) J Acasuso	3	6	6
