= 2008 Roma Open – Singles =

Singles
- 2008 Roma Open

Final
- Champion: (Argentina) Eduardo Schwank
- Runner-up: (France) Éric Prodon
- Score: 6–3, 6–7^{(2–7)}, 7–6^{(7–3)}

Events
Singles	Doubles
← 2007 ·	Roma Open	· 2009 →

Thierry Ascione was the defender of title; however, he chose not to play.
Eduardo Schwank won in the final 6–3, 6–7^{(2–7)}, 7–6^{(7–3)}, against Éric Prodon.

== Seeds ==
1. (Italy) Flavio Cipolla (first round)
2. (Argentina) Eduardo Schwank (champion)
3. (France) Éric Prodon (final)
4. (Austria) Daniel Köllerer (semifinals)
5. (France) David Guez (quarterfinals)
6. (France) Laurent Recouderc (first round)
7. (United States) Hugo Armando (second round)
8. (France) Adrian Mannarino (semifinals)

== Draw ==
=== Key ===
- Q = Qualifier
- WC = Wild card
- LL = Lucky loser
- Alt = Alternate
- SE = Special exempt
- PR = Protected ranking
- ITF = ITF entry
- JE = Junior exempt
- w/o = Walkover
- r = Retired
- d = Defaulted
- SR = Special ranking

=== Final four ===
Semifinals
8	(France) Adrian Mannarino	7	4	5
3	(France) Éric Prodon	5	6	7
4	(Austria) Daniel Köllerer	1	2
2/SE	(Argentina) Eduardo Schwank	6	6

Final
3	(France) Éric Prodon	3	7	6^{3}
2/SE	(Argentina) Eduardo Schwank	6	6^{2}	7

=== Top half ===
First round
1	(Italy) F Cipolla	6	1	2
WC	(Italy) A Brizzi	4	6	6
(Russia) P Chekhov	2	1
(Argentina) C Villagrán	6	6
(France) T Oger	3	6^{2}
Q	(Netherlands) A van der Duim	6	7
(Belgium) D Norman	2	1
8	(France) A Mannarino	6	6
3	(France) É Prodon	6	7
Q	(Chile) A García	4	6^{1}
WC	(Italy) A Arnaboldi	6^{3}	6^{7}
(Brazil) C Zampieri	7	7
(Italy) F Aldi	6	6
(Italy) P Lorenzi	4	2
WC	(Italy) T Fabbiano	3	1
7	(United States) H Armando	6	6

Second round
WC	(Italy) A Brizzi	6^{3}	2
(Argentina) C Villagrán	7	6
Q	(Netherlands) A van der Duim	2	2
8	(France) A Mannarino	6	6
3	(France) É Prodon	6	6
(Brazil) C Zampieri	3	4
(Italy) F Aldi	7	6^{7}	6
7	(United States) H Armando	6^{1}	7	4

Quarterfinals
(Argentina) C Villagrán	2	5
8	(France) A Mannarino	6	7
3	(France) É Prodon	4	6	7
(Italy) F Aldi	6	1	5

Semifinals
8	(France) A Mannarino	7	4	5
3	(France) É Prodon	5	6	7

=== Bottom half ===
First round
6	(France) L Recouderc	6	1	1
(Germany) S Greul	3	6	6
WC	(Italy) A Biasella	2	1
(Italy) S Vagnozzi	6	6
(Switzerland) M Lammer	5	6	4
(Romania) V Crivoi	7	2	6
(Romania) A Ungur	4	6	3
4	(Austria) D Köllerer	6	2	6
5	(France) D Guez	6	6
(United States) A Kuznetsov	3	4
(Argentina) S Decoud	3	6	6
Q	(Serbia) D Savić	6	3	3
(Ukraine) A Dolgopolov	6	1	6
(Italy) S Galvani	2	6	2
Q	(Italy) G Petrazzuolo	1	2
2/SE	(Argentina) E Schwank	6	6

Second round
(Germany) S Greul	6	6^{5}	7
(Italy) S Vagnozzi	4	7	6^{6}
(Romania) V Crivoi	0	4
4	(Austria) D Köllerer	6	6
5	(France) D Guez	2	6	6
(Argentina) S Decoud	6	3	1
(Ukraine) A Dolgopolov	1	2
2/SE	(Argentina) E Schwank	6	6

Quarterfinals
(Germany) S Greul	3	6	3
4	(Austria) D Köllerer	6	2	6
5	(France) D Guez	6	1	6^{2}
2/SE	(Argentina) E Schwank	3	6	7

Semifinals
4	(Austria) D Köllerer	1	2
2/SE	(Argentina) E Schwank	6	6
