= Copa Petrobras =

Copa Petrobras may refer to one of six South American tennis tournaments, all part of the ATP Challenger Tour :

- Copa Petrobras Asunción, held in Asunción, Paraguay from 2006 until 2010. The event is played on outdoor clay courts.
- Copa Petrobras Bogotá, held in Bogotá, Colombia from 2004 until 2010. The event is played on outdoor clay courts.
- Copa Petrobras Buenos Aires, held in Buenos Aires, Argentina from 2006 until 2010. The event is played on outdoor clay courts.
- Copa Petrobras Montevideo, held in Montevideo, Uruguay from 2005 until 2010 before being renamed Uruguay Open. The event is played on outdoor clay courts.
- Copa Petrobras Santiago, held in Santiago, Chile in 2004 and 2005 and again in 2009 and 2010. The event is played on outdoor clay courts.
- Copa Petrobras São Paulo, held in São Paulo, Aracaju or Belo Horizonte, Brazil from 2004 until 2010. The event is played on outdoor red clay courts.
