= Pablo González (tennis) =

Colombian tennis player

- Country (sports): Colombia
- Residence: Bogotá, Colombia
- Born: 2 July 1982 (age 43) Bogotá, Colombia
- Height: 1.78 m (5 ft 10 in)
- Turned pro: 2001
- Plays: Right-handed
- Prize money: $81,817

Singles
- Career record: 7–13
- Career titles: 0
- Highest ranking: No. 299 (14 May 2007)

Doubles
- Career record: 1–6
- Career titles: 0
- Highest ranking: No. 240 (1 October 2007)
- Last updated on: 6 March 2018.

Pablo González (born 2 July 1982) is a retired Colombian tennis player.

González has a career high ATP singles ranking of 299 achieved on 14 May 2007. He also has a career high doubles ranking of 240 achieved on 1 October 2007.

He made his main draw debut on the ATP Tour at the 2000 Bancolombia Open as a wild card in the singles competition.

He has been part of the Colombia Davis Cup team from 2000 until 2007. Since 2016, he is the captain of the Colombia Davis Cup Team.

== ATP Challenger and ITF Futures finals ==
=== Singles: 9 (4–5) ===
ATP Challenger (0–1)
ITF Futures (4–4)

Result	W–L	Date	Tournament	Tier	Surface	Opponent	Score
Win	1–0	Jun 2002	Santa Fé de Bogotá, Colombia	Futures	Clay	(Colombia) Alejandro Falla	7–6^{(8–6)}, 7–6^{(7–2)}
Loss	1–1	Oct 2002	El Ejido, Spain	Futures	Hard	(Spain) Rafael Moreno-Negrin	2–6, 2–6
Loss	1–2	May 2003	Aguascalientes, Mexico	Futures	Hard	(Brazil) Ronaldo Carvalho	3–6, 6–4, 2–6
Win	2–2	May 2003	Ciudad Obregón, Mexico	Futures	Hard	(Mexico) Santiago González	6–2, 6–1
Win	3–2	Sep 2003	La Paz, Bolivia	Futures	Clay	(Argentina) Guillermo Carry	7–5, 6–3
Loss	3–3	Sep 2004	Guayaquil, Ecuador	Futures	Hard	(Netherlands Antilles) Jean-Julien Rojer	4–6, 1–6
Loss	0–1	Apr 2005	Bogotá, Colombia	Challenger	Clay	(Chile) Paul Capdeville	3–6, 4–6
Win	4–3	May 2006	Barranquilla, Colombia	Futures	Clay	(Chile) Jorge Aguilar	6–4, 3–6, 7–5
Loss	4–4	Sep 2006	Guayaquil, Ecuador	Futures	Clay	(Argentina) Brian Dabul	4–6, 4–6

=== Doubles: 21 (7–14) ===
ATP Challenger (0–2)
ITF Futures (7–12)

Result	W–L	Date	Tournament	Tier	Surface	Partner	Opponents	Score
Loss	0–1	Oct 2000	Bogotá, Colombia	Futures	Clay	(Colombia) Alejandro Falla	(Italy) Leonardo Azzaro (Israel) Eyal Ran	2–6, 2–6
Win	1–1	Aug 2001	Dénia, Spain	Futures	Clay	(Colombia) Alejandro Falla	(Spain) Jordi Fernández-Rubio (Spain) Ángel-José Martín-Arroyo	2–6, 6–2, 6–2
Loss	1–2	Sep 2001	Madrid, Spain	Futures	Hard	(Spain) Ruben Merchan-Huecas	(Spain) Carlos Rexach-Itoiz (Benin) Arnaud Segodo	6–7^{(5–7)}, 4–6
Loss	1–3	Jun 2002	Santa Fé de Bogotá, Colombia	Futures	Clay	(Colombia) Michael Quintero	(Brazil) Eduardo Bohrer (Brazil) Ricardo Schlachter	1–6, 1–6
Loss	1–4	Jan 2003	San Salvador, El Salvador	Futures	Clay	(Colombia) Michael Quintero	(France) Benjamin Cassaigne (Ivory Coast) Valentin Sanon	6–3, 1–6, 4–6
Loss	1–5	Jun 2003	Pereira, Colombia	Futures	Clay	(Mexico) Santiago González	(Brazil) Marcelo Melo (Brazil) Bruno Soares	3–6, 2–6
Win	2–5	Jul 2003	Guayaquil, Ecuador	Futures	Hard	(Argentina) Sebastián Decoud	(Argentina) Juan-Martín Aranguren (Argentina) Diego Cristin	6–4, 7–5
Loss	2–6	Aug 2003	Porto Alegre, Brazil	Futures	Clay	(Brazil) Gabriel Pitta	(Brazil) Eduardo Bohrer (Chile) Paul Capdeville	4–6, 6–7^{(4–7)}
Win	3–6	Sep 2003	La Paz, Bolivia	Futures	Clay	(Bolivia) Javier Taborga	(Argentina) Patricio Arquez (Argentina) Sebastián Decoud	7–6^{(7–1)}, 6–2
Loss	3–7	Sep 2004	Guayaquil, Ecuador	Futures	Hard	(Argentina) Sebastián Decoud	(United States) Levar Harper-Griffith (Netherlands Antilles) Jean-Julien Rojer	6–2, 5–7, 3–6
Loss	3–8	Jan 2005	Cartagena, Colombia	Futures	Hard	(Argentina) Sebastián Decoud	(United States) Shuon Madden (Colombia) Rubén Torres	5–7, 4–6
Loss	3–9	Feb 2005	Bucaramanga, Colombia	Futures	Clay	(Argentina) Sebastián Decoud	(Brazil) Alexandre Bonatto (Brazil) Marcelo Melo	4–6, 4–6
Loss	3–10	May 2005	Cali, Colombia	Futures	Clay	(Colombia) Michael Quintero	(Brazil) Lucas Engel (Brazil) André Ghem	4–6, 4–6
Loss	3–11	May 2005	Pereira, Colombia	Futures	Clay	(Brazil) Bruno Soares	(Mexico) Daniel Garza (Argentina) Diego Hartfield	6–7^{(4–7)}, 6–7^{(1–7)}
Win	4–11	Jul 2005	Heerhugowaard, Netherlands	Futures	Clay	(Argentina) Nicolás Todero	(Belgium) Dominique Coene (Netherlands) Jasper Smit	2–6, 6–3, 6–2
Loss	4–12	Nov 2006	Querétaro, Mexico	Futures	Hard	(Mexico) Daniel Garza	(Mexico) Bruno Rodríguez (Mexico) Víctor Romero	1–6, 7–5, 6–7^{(3–7)}
Loss	0–1	Apr 2007	San Luis Potosí, Mexico	Challenger	Clay	(Chile) Jorge Aguilar	(France) Jérémy Chardy (Brazil) Marcelo Melo	0–6, 3–6
Win	5–12	May 2007	Cali, Colombia	Futures	Clay	(Uruguay) Marcel Felder	(Ecuador) Carlos Avellán (Mexico) Daniel Garza	6–4, 6–0
Win	6–12	May 2007	Pereira, Colombia	Futures	Clay	(Uruguay) Marcel Felder	(Mexico) Daniel Garza (Colombia) Michael Quintero	6–3, 6–4
Loss	0–2	Jul 2007	Bogotá, Colombia	Challenger	Clay	(Argentina) Leonardo Mayer	(Argentina) Brian Dabul (Mexico) Santiago González	2–6, 2–6
Win	7–12	Oct 2008	Valencia, Venezuela	Futures	Clay	(Colombia) Alejandro González	(Venezuela) Piero Luisi (Venezuela) Roberto Maytín	6–3, 6–4
