= 2002 Copa AT&T =

- Date: 18–24 February
- Edition: 30th
- Category: International Series
- Draw: 32S / 16D
- Prize money: $400,000
- Surface: Clay / outdoor
- Location: Buenos Aires, Argentina
- Venue: Buenos Aires Lawn Tennis Club

Champions

Singles
- (Chile) Nicolás Massú

Doubles
- (Argentina) Gastón Etlis / (Argentina) Martín Rodríguez
← 2001 ·	ATP Buenos Aires	· 2003 →

The 2002 Copa AT&T was a men's tennis tournament played on outdoor clay courts at the Buenos Aires Lawn Tennis Club in Buenos Aires, Argentina and was part of the International Series of the 2002 ATP Tour. The tournament ran from February 18 through February 24, 2002. Unseeded Nicolás Massú won the singles title.

== Finals ==
=== Singles ===
(Chile) Nicolás Massú defeated (Argentina) Agustín Calleri 2–6, 7–6^{(7–5)}, 6–2

- It was Massú's only title of the year and the 1st of his career.

=== Doubles ===
(Argentina) Gastón Etlis / (Argentina) Martín Rodríguez defeated (Sweden) Simon Aspelin / (Australia) Andrew Kratzmann 3–6, 6–3, [10–4]

- It was Etlis' 2nd title of the year and the 2nd of his career. It was Rodríguez's 2nd title of the year and the 2nd of his career.
