= 2010 Copa Petrobras Bogotá =

- Date: 20–26 September
- Edition: 7th
- Location: Bogotá, Colombia

Champions

Singles
- (Brazil) João Souza

Doubles
- (Brazil) Franco Ferreiro / (Brazil) André Sá
← 2009 ·	Copa Petrobras Bogotá	· 2011 →

The 2010 Copa Petrobras Bogotá was a professional tennis tournament played on outdoor clay courts. It was the seventh edition of the tournament which is part of the 2010 ATP Challenger Tour. It took place in Bogotá, Colombia between 20 and 26 September 2010.

== ATP entrants ==
=== Seeds ===
Country	Player	Rank^{1}	Seed
PAR	Ramón Delgado	136	1
BRA	João Souza	138	2
COL	Carlos Salamanca	144	3
BRA	Marcos Daniel	151	4
RSA	Izak van der Merwe	159	5
USA	Kevin Kim	161	6
GER	Andre Begemann	174	7
BRA	Caio Zampieri	195	8

- Rankings are as of September 13, 2010.

=== Other entrants ===
The following players received wildcards into the singles main draw:

- (Colombia) Juan Sebastián Gómez
- (Colombia) Alejandro González
- (Brazil) José Pereira
- (Colombia) Sebastián Serrano

The following players received an entry as a special exempt into the singles main draw:

- (Brazil) Rodrigo Guidolin

The following players received entry from the qualifying draw:

- (Argentina) Diego Álvarez
- (Germany) Martin Emmrich
- (Germany) Gero Kretschmer
- (Brazil) Eládio Ribeiro Neto

== Champions ==
=== Singles ===
(Brazil) João Souza def. (Morocco) Reda El Amrani, 6–4, 7–6(5)

=== Doubles ===
(Brazil) Franco Ferreiro / (Brazil) André Sá def. (Germany) Gero Kretschmer / (Germany) Alex Satschko, 7–6(6), 6–4
