= Rubén Torres (tennis) =

Colombian tennis player

- Full name: Rubén-Darío Torres
- Country (sports): Colombia
- Born: 23 February 1981 (age 44); Cali, Colombia
- Height: 5 ft 9 in (175 cm)
- Plays: Right-handed
- Prize money: $17,303

Singles
- Career record: 0–1 (Davis Cup)
- Highest ranking: No. 627 (14 May 2007)

Doubles
- Career record: 0–1 (Davis Cup)
- Highest ranking: No. 549 (5 Feb 2007)

Rubén-Darío Torres (born 23 February 1981) is a Colombian former professional tennis player.

A native of Cali, Torres represented Colombia in a 2000 Davis Cup tie against Ecuador in Bogotá. While competing on the professional tour he attained best rankings of 627 for singles and 549 for doubles, with his three ITF Futures titles won in doubles. He was also a collegiate tennis player for the University of Southern California (USC Trojans), featuring in the 2002 NCAA Division I championship team.

Torres was in a relationship with Hollywood actress Hilary Swank from 2015 to 2016 and the pair were briefly engaged. He now works as a financial advisor in Los Angeles.

== ITF Futures titles ==
=== Doubles: (3) ===
No.	Date	Tournament	Surface	Partner	Opponents	Score
1.	Oct 2000	Colombia F1, Bogotá	Clay	(Ecuador) Giovanni Lapentti	(Argentina) Gustavo Marcaccio (Argentina) Patricio Rudi	7–5, 2–0 ret.
2.	Jan 2005	Colombia F1, Cartagena	Hard	(United States) Shuon Madden	(Argentina) Sebastián Decoud (Colombia) Pablo González	7–5, 6–4
3.	Jun 2006	Thailand F1, Bangkok	Hard	(South Africa) Izak van der Merwe	(United States) Lester Cook (Canada) Rob Steckley	6–4, 6–3
