= 2001 Copa AT&T =

- Date: 19–25 February
- Edition: 29th
- Category: International Series
- Draw: 32S / 16D
- Prize money: $600,000
- Surface: Clay / outdoor
- Location: Buenos Aires, Argentina
- Venue: Buenos Aires Lawn Tennis Club

Champions

Singles
- (Brazil) Gustavo Kuerten

Doubles
- (Argentina) Lucas Arnold / (Spain) Tomás Carbonell
← 2000 ·	ATP Buenos Aires	· 2002 →

The 2001 Copa AT&T was a men's tennis tournament played on outdoor clay courts at the Buenos Aires Lawn Tennis Club in Buenos Aires, Argentina that was part of the International Series of the 2001 ATP Tour. The tournament ran from 19 February through 25 February 2001. First-seeded Gustavo Kuerten won the singles title.

== Finals ==
=== Singles ===
(Brazil) Gustavo Kuerten defeated (Argentina) José Acasuso 6–1, 6–3

- It was Kuerten's 1st title of the year and the 18th of his career.

=== Doubles ===
(Argentina) Lucas Arnold / (Spain) Tomás Carbonell defeated (Argentina) Mariano Hood / (Argentina) Sebastián Prieto 5–7, 7–5, 7–6^{(7–5)}

- It was Arnold's 2nd title of the year and the 8th of his career. It was Carbonell's 2nd title of the year and the 23rd of his career.
