= ATP Challenger La Serena =

Defunct tennis tournament
- Founded: 2005
- Abolished: 2008
- Editions: 3
- Location: La Serena, Chile
- Venue: La Serena Golf resort
- Category: ATP Challenger Series
- Surface: Clay (red)
- Draw: 32S/17Q/16D
- Prize money: $50,000+H

The Challenger La Serena was a professional tennis tournament played on outdoor red clay courts. It is part of the Association of Tennis Professionals (ATP) Challenger Tour. It was held three times in La Serena, Chile, in 2005, 2007 and 2008.

== Past finals ==
=== Singles ===
| Year | Champion | Runner-up | Score |
|---|---|---|---|
| 2008 | (Spain) Rubén Ramírez Hidalgo | (Spain) David Marrero | 6–3, 6–1 |
| 2007 | (Argentina) Mariano Zabaleta | (Argentina) Juan Pablo Brzezicki | 6–2, 6–4 |
| 2006 | Not held | | |
| 2005 | (Argentina) Edgardo Massa | (Argentina) Mariano Puerta | 6–4, 7–6(3) |

=== Doubles ===
| Year | Champions | Runners-up | Score |
|---|---|---|---|
| 2008 | (Ecuador) Nicolás Lapentti (Argentina) Eduardo Schwank | (Argentina) Sebastián Decoud (Argentina) Cristian Villagrán | 6-4 6-0 |
| 2007 | (Spain) Marc López (Italy) Simone Vagnozzi | (Argentina) Carlos Berlocq (Argentina) Brian Dabul | 3–6, 6–3, [10–1] |
| 2006 | Not held | | |
| 2005 | (Italy) Enzo Artoni (Paraguay) Ramón Delgado | (Germany) Tomas Behrend (Brazil) Marcos Daniel | 7-6(2), 6-4 |
