= Leonardo Olguín =

Argentine tennis player

- Full name: Leonardo Olguín
- Country (sports): Argentina
- Born: 8 October 1975 (age 49); Mendoza, Argentina
- Prize money: $94,988

Singles
- Career record: 0–1
- Career titles: 0
- Highest ranking: No. 180 (15 July 2002)

Doubles
- Career record: 0–1
- Career titles: 0
- Highest ranking: No. 154 (10 February 2003)

Leonardo Olguín (born 8 October 1975) is a former professional tennis player from Argentina.

== Biography ==
Olguín, who comes from Mendoza, had wins over Gustavo Kuerten, Magnus Norman and Nicolás Lapentti as a junior.

His professional appearances were mostly restricted to the Challenger tour, where he won a total of four titles, all in doubles. He reached the top 200 in the rankings for both singles and doubles during his career.

At the 2001 Copa AT&T in Buenos Aires, Olguín made the main round of his first ATP Tour tournament, qualifying for the doubles event with Diego del Río. He returned to the Buenos Aires tournament in 2002 and qualified for the singles. His first round opponent was third seed Nicolás Lapentti, who won the match in three sets.

He got to the third round of qualifying at the 2002 French Open.

Since 2003 he has been involved in coaching. He worked for many years with Martín Vassallo Argüello and is the Director of the Florida Tennis Club in Buenos Aires.

== Challenger titles ==
=== Doubles: (4) ===
No.	Year	Tournament	Surface	Partner	Opponents	Score
1.	2001	Campinas, Brazil	Clay	(Argentina) Edgardo Massa	(Venezuela) José de Armas (Brazil) Flávio Saretta	6–7^{(6)}, 6–2, 7–5
2.	2001	Brasília, Brazil	Clay	(Argentina) Gastón Etlis	(Argentina) Gustavo Marcaccio (Argentina) Patricio Rudi	6–4, 6–4
3.	2002	Geneva, Switzerland	Clay	(Romania) Victor Hănescu	(Argentina) Andrés Schneiter (Bulgaria) Orlin Stanoytchev	1–6, 6–4, 6–4
4.	2002	Freudenstadt, Germany	Clay	(Argentina) Diego del Río	(Spain) Joan Balcells (Kazakhstan) Yuri Schukin	7–6^{(2)}, 6–4
