= Michael Quintero =

Colombian tennis player (born 1980)

Michael Quintero Aguilar
- Country (sports): Colombia
- Residence: Medellín, Colombia
- Born: July 11, 1980 (age 45) Medellín, Colombia
- Height: 1.76 m (5 ft 9 1/2 in)
- Turned pro: 1998
- Plays: Right-handed (two-handed backhand)
- Prize money: $205,782

Singles
- Career record: 8–4 (at ATP Tour level, Grand Slam level, and in Davis Cup)
- Career titles: 0; 0 Challenger, 10 Futures
- Highest ranking: No. 245 (12 November 2007)

Grand Slam singles results
- Australian Open: Q1 (2008)
- French Open: Q1 (2008)
- US Open: Q1 (2007, 2008)

Doubles
- Career record: 0-9 (at ATP Tour level, Grand Slam level, and in Davis Cup)
- Career titles: 0; 1 Challenger, 13 Futures
- Highest ranking: No. 231 (27 October 2008)
- Last updated on: 27 May 2021.

Michael Quintero Aguilar (Spanish pronunciation: [ˈmajkol kinˈteɾo aɣiˈlaɾ]; born July 11, 1980) is a Colombian professional tennis player.

Quintero reached a career high ATP singles ranking of world No,. 245, achieved on 12 November 2007. He also reached a career high ATP doubles ranking of world No. 231, achieved on 27 October 2008.

Quintero won eight tournaments in Colombia, Jamaica and Cuba. Quintero represented Colombia in Rio 2007 Pan American Games where he got to the semifinals where he lost against Chilean Adrián García, then Quintero lost the bronze medal match against Argentine Eduardo Schwank. He represents Team Colombia while competing in the Davis Cup.

Quintero has reached 28 career singles finals with a record of 10 wins and 18 losses, which includes a record of 0–1 in ATP Challenger Tour finals. Additionally, he has reached 33 career doubles finals with a record of 14 wins and 19 losses, which includes a 1–4 record in ATP Challenger Tour finals.

== ATP Challenger and ITF Futures finals ==
=== Singles: 28 (10–18) ===
Legend ATP Challenger (0–1) ITF Futures (10–17)	Finals by surface Hard (4–5) Clay (6–13) Grass (0–0) Carpet (0–0)

Result	W–L	Date	Tournament	Tier	Surface	Opponent	Score
Win	1–0	Oct 2001	Colombia F1, Bogotá	Futures	Clay	(Argentina) Juan Pablo Guzmán	7–6^{(8–6)}, 6–4
Loss	1–1	Oct 2001	Colombia F2, Bogotá	Futures	Clay	(Colombia) Carlos Salamanca	6–7^{(4–7)}, 3–6
Win	2–1	Apr 2002	Jamaica F2, Montego Bay	Futures	Hard	(United States) Tres Davis	6–3, 2–6. 6–4
Loss	2–2	Jul 2002	Venezuela F2, Maracaibo	Futures	Hard	(Venezuela) José de Armas	6–1, 0–6, 3–6
Loss	2–3	Oct 2002	Mexico F15, Obregón	Futures	Hard	(Brazil) Pedro Braga	3–6, 4–6
Win	3–3	Jul 2003	USA F18, Pittsburgh	Futures	Clay	(South Africa) Justin Bower	4–4 ret.
Loss	3–4	Feb 2004	USA F4, Brownsville	Futures	Hard	(United States) Andres Pedroso	1–6, 6–3, 4–6
Loss	3–5	May 2004	Colombia F1, Cali	Futures	Clay	(Brazil) Júlio Silva	2–6, 2–6
Loss	3–6	Oct 2004	Colombia F3, Medellín	Futures	Clay	(Argentina) Sebastián Decoud	4–6, 5–7
Loss	3–7	Jul 2005	USA F16, Pittsburgh	Futures	Clay	(Romania) Cătălin-Ionuț Gârd	7–6^{(7–5)}, 2–6, 2–6
Loss	3–8	Aug 2006	Venezuela F1, Caracas	Futures	Clay	(Ecuador) Julio César Campozano	1–6, 7–6^{(7–5)}, 6–7^{(6–8)}
Loss	3–9	Jan 2007	Colombia F1, Manizales	Futures	Clay	(Colombia) Carlos Salamanca	4–6, 4–6
Win	4–9	Feb 2007	Colombia F2, Bucaramanga	Futures	Clay	(Colombia) Carlos Salamanca	6–2, 6–3
Win	5–9	May 2007	Colombia F3, Cali	Futures	Clay	(Ecuador) Julio César Campozano	6–1, 6–0
Loss	5–10	May 2007	Colombia F5, Pasto	Futures	Clay	(Colombia) Juan Sebastián Cabal	3–6, 6–4, 6–7^{(6–8)}
Loss	5–11	Aug 2007	Campos do Jordão, Brazil	Challenger	Hard	(Argentina) Brian Dabul	5–7, 5–7
Loss	5–12	Nov 2007	El Salvador F2, La Libertad	Futures	Clay	(Argentina) Nicolás Todero	4–6, 6–3, 2–6
Win	6–12	Feb 2008	Cuba F2, La Habana	Futures	Hard	(Brazil) Ricardo Hocevar	6–3, 7–5
Win	7–12	May 2008	Colombia F3, Pereira	Futures	Clay	(Ecuador) Julio César Campozano	6–1, 6–4
Win	8–12	May 2008	Colombia F4, Barranquilla	Futures	Clay	(Mexico) Santiago González	6–3, 7–6^{(7–4)}
Loss	8–13	Jun 2012	Peru F2, Lima	Futures	Clay	(Argentina) Diego Schwartzman	2–6, 2–6
Loss	8–14	Aug 2012	Colombia F2, Medellín	Futures	Clay	(Mexico) César Ramírez	walkover
Loss	8–15	Sep 2012	Colombia F3, Cúcuta	Futures	Clay	(Colombia) Alejandro González	5–7, 2–6
Win	9–15	Nov 2012	Mexico F15, Mazatlán	Futures	Hard	(El Salvador) Marcelo Arévalo	6–1, 6–7^{(4–7)}, 1–0 ret.
Loss	9–16	May 2013	El Salvador F1, Santa Tecla	Futures	Clay	(Colombia) Carlos Salamanca	3–6, 3–6
Loss	9–17	Oct 2013	Mexico F15, Quintana Roo	Futures	Hard	(Mexico) César Ramírez	1–6, 1–6
Win	10–17	Nov 2013	Mexico F17, Quintana Roo	Futures	Hard	(Barbados) Darian King	7–5, 0–6, 6–2
Loss	10–18	Feb 2014	El Salvador F1, Santa Tecla	Futures	Clay	(France) Éric Prodon	7–5, 1–6, 2–6

=== Doubles: 33 (14–19) ===
Legend ATP Challenger (1–4) ITF Futures (13–15)	Finals by surface Hard (4–1) Clay (10–18) Grass (0–0) Carpet (0–0)

Result	W–L	Date	Tournament	Tier	Surface	Partner	Opponents	Score
Loss	0–1	Jun 2001	Brazil F4, Florianópolis	Futures	Clay	(Argentina) Guillermo Carry	(Brazil) Márcio Carlsson (Brazil) Ricardo Schlachter	3–6, 2–6
Loss	0–2	Sep 2001	Bolivia F1, La Paz	Futures	Clay	(Argentina) Federico Cardinali	(Argentina) Sebastián Decoud (Argentina) Sebastian Uriarte	2–6, 4–6
Loss	0–3	Jun 2002	Colombia F1, Bogotá	Futures	Clay	(Colombia) Pablo González	(Brazil) Eduardo Bohrer (Brazil) Ricardo Schlachter	1–6, 1–6
Loss	0–4	Jan 2003	El Salvador F1, San Salvador	Futures	Clay	(Colombia) Pablo González	(France) Benjamin Cassaigne (Ivory Coast) Valentin Sanon	6–3, 1–6, 4–6
Win	1–4	May 2003	Colombia F1A, Cali	Futures	Clay	(United States) Mirko Pehar	(Colombia) Alejandro Falla (Colombia) Carlos Salamanca	6–3, 6–4
Win	2–4	Jun 2003	USA F17, Williamsville	Futures	Clay	(France) Gary Lugassy	(United States) Michael Kosta (United States) Aaron Talarico	6–2, 6–3
Win	3–4	May 2004	Colombia F1, Cali	Futures	Clay	(Colombia) Carlos Salamanca	(Argentina) Damián Patriarca (Argentina) Diego Hartfield	7–5, 6–4
Win	4–4	Sep 2004	Bolivia F1, La Paz	Futures	Clay	(Colombia) Carlos Salamanca	(Argentina) Guillermo Carry (Portugal) Leonardo Tavares	7–5, 6–4
Loss	4–5	May 2005	Colombia F3, Cali	Futures	Clay	(Colombia) Pablo González	(Brazil) Lucas Engel (Brazil) André Ghem	4–6, 4–6
Win	5–5	Sep 2005	Ecuador F3, Guayaquil	Futures	Clay	(Argentina) Brian Dabul	(Venezuela) Jhonnatan Medina-Álvarez (Uruguay) Martín Vilarrubí	6–3, 6–4
Loss	5–6	Oct 2005	Colombia F6, Medellín	Futures	Clay	(Colombia) Sergio Ramirez	(Chile) Felipe Parada (Argentina) Luciano Vitullo	3–6, 5–7
Win	6–6	Nov 2005	Mexico F17, León	Futures	Hard	(Mexico) Daniel Garza	(Sweden) Mikael Ekman (Sweden) Carl-Henrik Hansen	3–6, 6–1, 7–6^{(12–10)}
Win	7–6	Feb 2006	Panama F1, Panama City	Futures	Clay	(Argentina) Emiliano Redondi	(United Kingdom) David Brewer (United Kingdom) Ross Hutchins	7–6^{(9–7)}, 7–6^{(7–4)}
Win	8–6	Mar 2006	USA F7, Little Rock	Futures	Hard	(South Africa) Wesley Whitehouse	(United States) Brendan Evans (United States) Scott Oudsema	6–4, 6–2
Loss	8–7	May 2006	Colombia F3, Cali	Futures	Clay	(Brazil) Lucas Engel	(Chile) Jorge Aguilar (Mexico) Daniel Garza	3–6, 2–6
Loss	8–8	May 2006	Colombia F4, Barranquilla	Futures	Clay	(Ecuador) Carlos Avellán	(Chile) Jorge Aguilar (Mexico) Daniel Garza	6–4, 3–6, 2–6
Win	9–8	Jul 2006	Bogotá, Colombia	Challenger	Clay	(Mexico) Daniel Garza	(Brazil) Rogério Dutra Silva (Uruguay) Martín Vilarrubí	7–6^{(8–6)}, 6–4
Loss	9–9	Sep 2006	Bolivia F2, Cochabamba	Futures	Clay	(Argentina) Diego Cristin	(Colombia) Juan Sebastián Cabal (Argentina) Alejandro Kon	6–7^{(4–7)}, 3–6
Loss	9–10	May 2007	Colombia F4, Pereira	Futures	Clay	(Mexico) Daniel Garza	(Colombia) Pablo González (Uruguay) Marcel Felder	3–6, 4–6
Win	10–10	Nov 2007	El Salvador F2, La Libertad	Futures	Clay	(Netherlands) Bart Beks	(Romania) Raian Luchici (United States) Brad Pomeroy	6–3, 0–6, [10–8]
Loss	10–11	Nov 2007	Guayaquil, Ecuador	Challenger	Clay	(Netherlands) Bart Beks	(Argentina) Brian Dabul (Argentina) Juan Pablo Guzmán	6–7^{(5–7)}, 3–6
Loss	10–12	Nov 2007	Lima, Peru	Challenger	Clay	(Uruguay) Martín Vilarrubí	(Uruguay) Pablo Cuevas (Argentina) Eduardo Schwank	4–6, 2–6
Win	11–12	Feb 2008	Colombia F2, Bucaramanga	Futures	Clay	(Colombia) Carlos Salamanca	(Argentina) Juan-Pablo Amado (Argentina) Diego Álvarez	6–3, 2–6, [10–8]
Loss	11–13	Jul 2008	Bogotá, Colombia	Challenger	Clay	(Colombia) Juan Sebastián Cabal	(Colombia) Carlos Salamanca (Belgium) Xavier Malisse	1–6, 4–6
Win	12–13	Nov 2008	El Salvador F2, La Libertad	Futures	Clay	(Colombia) Carlos Salamanca	(Czech Republic) Jiří Krkoška (Canada) Vasek Pospisil	6–7^{(8–10)}, 6–4, [14–12]
Win	13–13	May 2009	Venezuela F3, Maracaibo	Futures	Hard	(Colombia) Sat Galan	(Ecuador) Patricio Alvarado (Argentina) Juan-Manuel Romanazzi	6–1, 7–5
Win	14–13	Aug 2009	Venezuela F6, Caracas	Futures	Hard	(Venezuela) Yohny Romero	(El Salvador) Marcelo Arévalo (Guatemala) Christopher Díaz Figueroa	6–3, 7–6^{(7–5)}
Loss	14–14	Aug 2009	Colombia F3, Barranquilla	Futures	Clay	(Mexico) Daniel Garza	(Argentina) Andrés Molteni (Argentina) Gonzalo Tur	4–6, 6–7^{(6–8)}
Loss	14–15	Aug 2009	Colombia F5, Medellín	Futures	Clay	(Mexico) Daniel Garza	(Colombia) Alejandro González (Colombia) Juan Sebastián Cabal	1–6, 4–6
Loss	14–16	Oct 2009	Quito, Ecuador	Challenger	Clay	(Spain) Fernando Vicente	(Mexico) Santiago González (United States) Travis Rettenmaier	6–1, 3–6, [3–10]
Loss	14–17	Jun 2010	Venezuela F1, Maracaibo	Futures	Hard	(Mexico) Miguel Gallardo Valles	(Colombia) Robert Farah (Colombia) Juan Sebastián Cabal	1–6, 5–7
Loss	14–18	Aug 2012	Colombia F1, Bogotá	Futures	Clay	(Dominican Republic) Víctor Estrella Burgos	(Mexico) César Ramírez (Peru) Mauricio Echazú	4–6, 5–7
Loss	14–19	Aug 2012	Colombia F2, Medellín	Futures	Clay	(Colombia) Nicolás Barrientos	(Peru) Duilio Beretta (Uruguay) Ariel Behar	1–2 ret.
