= Copa Petrobras Bogotá =

Copa Petrobras Colombia

ATP Challenger Tour
- Location: Bogotá, Colombia
- Category: ATP Challenger Series
- Surface: Clay / Outdoors
- Draw: 32S/32Q/16D
- Prize money: $75,000
- Website: Official Website

The Copa Petrobras Colombia is a tennis tournament held in Bogotá, Colombia since 2004. The event is part of the challenger series and is played on outdoor clay courts.

== Past finals ==
=== Singles ===
Year	Champion	Runner-up	Score
2010	(Brazil) João Souza	(Morocco) Reda El Amrani	6–4, 7–6(5)
2009	(Colombia) Carlos Salamanca	(Italy) Riccardo Ghedin	6–1, 7–6(5)
2008	(Brazil) Marcos Daniel	(Argentina) Horacio Zeballos	6–4, 4–6, 6–4
2007	(Brazil) Marcos Daniel	(Colombia) Santiago Giraldo	7–6, 6–4
2006	(Argentina) Diego Hartfield	(Austria) Daniel Köllerer	6–3, 7–5
2005	(Brazil) Marcos Daniel	(Austria) Daniel Köllerer	6–2, 6–3
2004	(Paraguay) Ramón Delgado	(Argentina) Mariano Puerta	6–4, 7–5

=== Doubles ===
Year	Champion	Runner-up	Score
2010	(Brazil) Franco Ferreiro (Brazil) André Sá	(Germany) Gero Kretschmer (Germany) Alex Satschko	7–6(6), 6–4
2009	(Colombia) Alejandro Falla (Colombia) Alejandro González	(Argentina) Sebastián Decoud (Argentina) Diego Álvarez	5–7, 6–4, [10–8]
2008	(Colombia) Juan Sebastián Cabal (Colombia) Alejandro Falla	(Argentina) Alejandro Fabbri (Argentina) Horacio Zeballos	3–6, 7–6, [10–8]
2007	(Brazil) Thomaz Bellucci (Brazil) Bruno Soares	(Spain) Marcel Granollers (Spain) Santiago Ventura	6–4, 4–6, [11–9]
2006	(Brazil) Marcelo Melo (Brazil) André Sá	(United States) Eric Nunez (Netherlands Antilles) Jean-Julien Rojer	6–4, 7–6
2005	(Brazil) Marcos Daniel (Mexico) Santiago González	(Portugal) Frederico Gil (Brazil) Marcelo Melo	6–2, 7–5
2004	(Argentina) Sergio Roitman (Spain) Santiago Ventura	(United Kingdom) Richard Barker (Germany) Frank Moser	7–5, 6–4
