= Gustavo Marcaccio =

Argentinian tennis player and coach

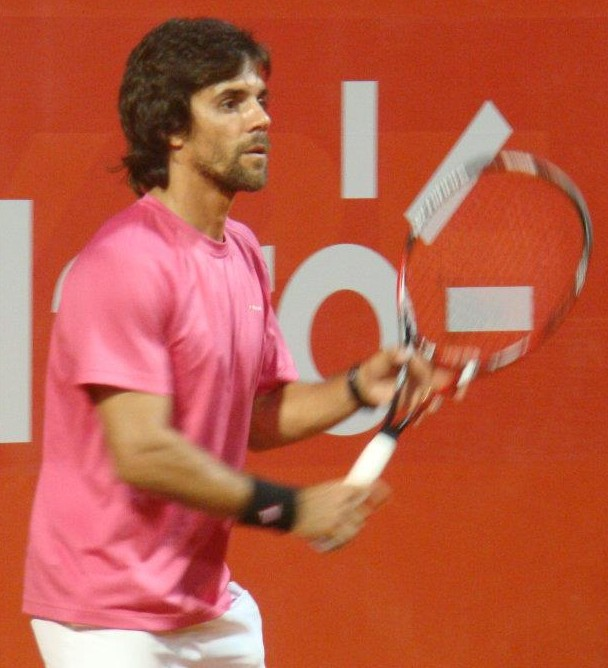
- Country (sports): Argentina
- Residence: Buenos Aires, Argentina
- Born: 3 May 1977 (age 48) Buenos Aires, Argentina
- Height: 1.70 m (5 ft 7 in)
- Plays: Right-handed (single-handed backhand)
- Prize money: $131,434

Singles
- Career record: 2–3 (at ATP Tour-level, Grand Slam-level, and in Davis Cup)
- Career titles: 0; 0 Challenger, 5 Futures
- Highest ranking: No. 284 (19 April 2004)

Grand Slam singles results
- Australian Open: Q1 (2008)
- French Open: Q1 (2004)

Doubles
- Career record: 1–5 (at ATP Tour-level, Grand Slam-level, and in Davis Cup)
- Career titles: 0; 0 Challenger, 13 Futures
- Highest ranking: No. 240 (22 March 2004)
- Last updated on: 3 November 2021.

Gustavo Marcaccio (born 3 May 1977) is an Argentine tennis coach and former professional player.

== Tennis career ==
Marcaccio, a native of Buenos Aires, played collegiate tennis in the United States for Arizona State University in the late 1990s, via the University of Mobile. In 1999 he was runner-up to Ryan Wolters in the Pac-10 singles championship.

While competing on the professional tour he had a career high singles ranking of 284. His best win came at the Prostějov Challenger in 2005, when he upset world number 20 Dominik Hrbatý in the first round. At ATP Tour level, Marcaccio had main draw wins over Luis Horna and Tomáš Zíb.

=== Coach ===
Marcaccio has had stints coaching his countrymen Guido Pella, Juan Mónaco and Máximo González. He was coach of Mónaco during his most successful season in 2012, when he won four ATP Tour titles, including the German Open, to break into the world's top 10.

In 2020 he coached Russian player Svetlana Kuznetsova. He then worked at Rafael Nadal Academy from April 2021 until December 2022 and as of December 2022 he coaches Rafael Nadal.

== ATP Challenger and ITF Futures finals ==
=== Singles: 6 (5–1) ===
Legend ATP Challenger (0–0) ITF Futures (5–1)	Finals by surface Hard (4–0) Clay (1–1) Grass (0–0) Carpet (0–0)

Result	W–L	Date	Tournament	Tier	Surface	Opponent	Score
Win	1–0	Aug 2000	Argentina F10, Buenos Aires	Futures	Clay	(Argentina) Juan Pablo Guzmán	6–1, 6–7^{(5–7)}, 7–5
Win	2–0	Feb 2001	Cuba F1, Havana	Futures	Hard	(Israel) Amir Hadad	6–2, 6–2
Win	3–0	Sep 2003	Mexico F14, Querétaro	Futures	Hard	(Mexico) Alejandro Hernández	6–7^{(6–8)}, 6–2, 6–4
Win	4–0	Oct 2003	Mexico F15, Coatzacoalcos	Futures	Hard	(United States) Andres Pedroso	6–3, 6–2
Win	5–0	Oct 2003	Mexico F18, Ciudad Obregón	Futures	Hard	(Brazil) Lucas Engel	7–6^{(7–4)}, 6–3
Loss	5–1	Sep 2004	Bolivia F1, La Paz	Futures	Clay	(Colombia) Carlos Salamanca	2–3 ret.

=== Doubles: 22 (13–9) ===
Legend ATP Challenger (0–3) ITF Futures (13–6)	Finals by surface Hard (2–2) Clay (11–7) Grass (0–0) Carpet (0–0)

Result	W–L	Date	Tournament	Tier	Surface	Partner	Opponents	Score
Win	1–0	Oct 1999	Paraguay F1, Asunción	Futures	Clay	(Argentina) Patricio Rudi	(Argentina) Ignacio González King (Argentina) Edgardo Massa	6–3, 6–1
Win	2–0	Aug 2000	Argentina F10, Buenos Aires	Futures	Clay	(Argentina) Patricio Rudi	(Argentina) Guillermo Carry (Argentina) Diego Cristin	3–6, 6–1, 6–1
Win	3–0	Sep 2000	Peru F2, Lima	Futures	Clay	(Argentina) Patricio Rudi	(Chile) Miguel Miranda (Chile) Juan-Felipe Yáñez	7–6^{(7–3)}, 0–6, 6–0
Win	4–0	Oct 2000	Bolivia F2, Cochabamba	Futures	Clay	(Argentina) Patricio Rudi	(Argentina) Rodolfo Daruich (Argentina) Cristian Villagrán	6–1, 6–2
Loss	4–1	Oct 2000	Colombia F1, Bogotá	Futures	Clay	(Argentina) Patricio Rudi	(Ecuador) Giovanni Lapentti (Colombia) Rubén Torres	5–7, 0–2 ret.
Loss	4–2	Apr 2001	Brazil F1, Rio de Janeiro	Futures	Clay	(Argentina) Patricio Rudi	(Argentina) Enzo Artoni (Argentina) Juan Pablo Guzmán	6–4, 2–6, 1–6
Loss	4–3	Jun 2001	Italy F5, Pavia	Futures	Clay	(Argentina) Juan-Mariano Perello	(Italy) Fabio Colangelo (Italy) Potito Starace	1–6, 1–6
Loss	4–4	Aug 2001	Brasília, Brazil	Challenger	Clay	(Argentina) Patricio Rudi	(Argentina) Gastón Etlis (Argentina) Leonardo Olguín	4–6, 4–6
Win	5–4	Oct 2001	Colombia F2, Bogotá	Futures	Clay	(Argentina) Patricio Rudi	(Argentina) Patricio Rudi (Netherlands) Rogier Wassen	walkover
Loss	5–5	Mar 2002	Mexico F1, Chetumal	Futures	Hard	(Argentina) Patricio Rudi	(Mexico) Bruno Echagaray (Mexico) Santiago González	6–1, 1–6, 0–6
Loss	5–6	Jun 2002	Portugal F1, Lisbon	Futures	Clay	(Portugal) Bernardo Mota	(Netherlands) Jasper Smit (Netherlands) Fred Hemmes	6–1, 6–7^{(1–7)}, 2–6
Win	6–6	Sep 2002	Netherlands F2, Alphen aan den Rijn	Futures	Clay	(Spain) Oscar Hernandez Perez	(Netherlands) Melvyn op der Heijde (Netherlands) Melle van Gemerden	6–2, 6–3
Loss	6–7	Oct 2002	Chile F6, Santiago	Futures	Clay	(Argentina) Patricio Arquez	(Chile) Sergio Elias-Musalem (Chile) Alvaro Loyola Ruz	3–6, 4–6
Win	7–7	Jun 2003	France F11, Toulon	Futures	Clay	(Argentina) Brian Dabul	(France) Édouard Roger-Vasselin (France) Pierrick Ysern	6–4, 7–6^{(7–4)}
Win	8–7	Aug 2003	Argentina F2, Buenos Aires	Futures	Clay	(Italy) Enzo Artoni	(Argentina) Juan-Martín Aranguren (Argentina) Matias De Genaro	4–6, 6–2, 6–3
Win	9–7	Sep 2003	Argentina F3, Buenos Aires	Futures	Clay	(Argentina) Patricio Rudi	(Argentina) Carlos Berlocq (Argentina) Brian Dabul	5–7, 6–4, 6–3
Win	10–7	Oct 2003	Mexico F18, Ciudad Obregón	Futures	Hard	(Mexico) Bruno Echagaray	(Brazil) Ronaldo Carvalho (Brazil) Lucas Engel	6–4, 3–6, 7–5
Win	11–7	Nov 2003	Argentina F6, Buenos Aires	Futures	Clay	(Argentina) Andrés Schneiter	(Argentina) Diego del Río (Argentina) Sebastián Prieto	6–2, 6–7^{(2–7)}, 6–4
Win	12–7	Nov 2003	Uruguay F1, Montevideo	Futures	Hard	(Argentina) Patricio Rudi	(Argentina) Sebastián Decoud (Argentina) Diego Hartfield	6–4, 6–4
Win	13–7	Jan 2004	El Salvador F1, San Salvador	Futures	Clay	(Argentina) Diego Hartfield	(Brazil) Lucas Engel (Brazil) Márcio Torres	6–0, 6–2
Loss	13–8	Mar 2004	Bogotá, Colombia	Challenger	Clay	(Argentina) Diego Veronelli	(Colombia) Sebastian Quintero (Colombia) Oscar Rodriguez-Sanchez	3–6, 4–6
Loss	13–9	Nov 2004	Puebla, Mexico	Challenger	Hard	(Mexico) Miguel Gallardo Valles	(Mexico) Alejandro Hernández (Mexico) Santiago González	3–6, 4–6
