= Riccardo Ghedin =

Italian tennis player

- Country (sports): Italy
- Residence: Rome, Italy
- Born: 5 December 1985 (age 40) Rome, Italy
- Height: 1.88 m (6 ft 2 in)
- Plays: Right-handed (two handed backhand)
- Coach: Francesco Elia
- Prize money: $317,926

Singles
- Career record: 0–3
- Career titles: 0
- Highest ranking: No. 222 (10 August 2009)

Grand Slam singles results
- Australian Open: Q2 (2009, 2013)
- French Open: Q2 (2009)
- Wimbledon: 1R (2009)
- US Open: Q1 (2009, 2010)

Doubles
- Career record: 0–1
- Career titles: 0
- Highest ranking: No. 109 (15 August 2016)
- Last updated on: 17 April 2021.

Riccardo Ghedin (born 5 December 1985) is an Italian tennis player. He began playing tennis when he was 12 years old.

At the 2009 Wimbledon Championships, Ghedin advanced successfully through the qualifying rounds to reach his first and only grand slam main draw. He lost in three sets in the first round to Latvian Ernests Gulbis 2–6, 4–6, 4–6. In his career, he has reached 16 singles finals on the ITF Futures Tour which have resulted in winning five singles titles, and finishing runner-up 11 times. In doubles, he has won seven Challenger titles and 16 Futures titles.

Ghedin reached a career high singles ranking of world No. 222 on 10 August 2009. He reached a career high doubles ranking of world No. 109 on 15 August 2016.

He has played in four ATP Tour level matches, three in singles and one in doubles, but has yet to win one.

== ATP Challenger and ITF Futures finals ==
=== Singles: 16 (5–11) ===
Legend ATP Challenger (0–2) ITF Futures (5–9)	Finals by surface Hard (5–9) Clay (0–2) Grass (0–0) Carpet (0–0)

Result	W–L	Date	Tournament	Tier	Surface	Opponent	Score
Loss	0–1	Nov 2005	Mexico F17, Leon	Futures	Hard	(Mexico) Victor Romero	3–6, 5–7
Loss	0–2	Jun 2006	Norway F2, Gausdal	Futures	Hard	(France) Thomas Oger	1–6, 6–3, 3–6
Loss	0–3	Aug 2006	Great Britain F12, Wrexham	Futures	Hard	(Republic of Ireland) Conor Niland	4–6, 6–2, 3–6
Win	1–3	May 2008	Greece F1, Kos	Futures	Hard	(United States) Shane La Porte	6–3, 6–2
Loss	1–4	May 2008	Kuwait F2, Meshref	Futures	Hard	(Australia) Miles Armstrong	6–7^{(4–7)}, 6–7^{(4–7)}
Win	2–4	Jun 2008	Norway F1, Gausdal	Futures	Hard	(Norway) Stian Boretti	1–6, 6–3, 6–1
Loss	2–5	Jul 2008	Syria F1, Damascus	Futures	Hard	(Canada) Pierre-Ludovic Duclos	4–6, 1–6
Loss	2–6	Sep 2008	Quito, Ecuador	Challenger	Clay	(Ecuador) Giovanni Lapentti	6–4, 6–4
Loss	2–7	Sep 2009	Bogota, Colombia	Challenger	Clay	(Colombia) Carlos Salamanca	1–6, 6–7^{(5-7)}
Win	3–7	Mar 2010	China F1, Kaiyuan	Futures	Hard	(France) Fabrice Martin	6–3, 6–4
Loss	3–8	Mar 2010	China F2, Mengzi City	Futures	Hard	(China) Zhang Zw	1–6, 4–6
Loss	3–9	Jun 2010	Norway F1, Gausdal	Futures	Hard	(Netherlands) Igor Sijsling	5–7, ret.
Loss	3–10	Oct 2010	Kuwait F1, Meshref	Futures	Hard	(Germany) Sebastian Rieschick	3–6, 7–6^{(7–5)}, 0–6
Win	4–10	Aug 2011	Turkey F23, Istanbul	Futures	Hard	(Australia) Brydan Klein	6–3, 6–3
Win	5–10	Feb 2012	Turkey F5, Antalya	Futures	Hard	(Belgium) Niels Desein	1–6, 6–4, 7–6^{(7–5)}
Loss	5–11	Jun 2013	Portugal F8, Guimaraes	Futures	Hard	(France) Jules Marie	3–6, 6–2, 3–6
