= Edgardo Massa =

Argentine tennis player (born 1981)

- Country (sports): Argentina
- Residence: Buenos Aires, Argentina
- Born: 22 March 1981 (age 44); Formosa, Argentina
- Height: 1.80 m (5 ft 11 in)
- Turned pro: 1998
- Retired: 2008
- Plays: Right-handed (one-handed backhand)
- Prize money: $300,279

Singles
- Career record: 8–16
- Career titles: 0
- Highest ranking: No. 91 (4 April 2005)

Grand Slam singles results
- Australian Open: Q1 (2003)
- French Open: 1R (2002, 2006)
- US Open: Q1 (2002)

Doubles
- Career record: 6–9
- Career titles: 0
- Highest ranking: No. 102 (8 July 2002)

Edgardo Massa (born 22 March 1981) is an Argentine tennis player, who turned professional in 1998. Massa plays right-handed, and uses a single-handed backhand.

== Career ==
Massa who is known by the nickname "Yayo", started playing tennis at the age of five. He was part of the same generation that produced David Nalbandian and Guillermo Coria. Together with Nalbandian and Coria, Massa represented Argentina in the Junior Davis Cup in 1996 and 1997. As a junior, Massa won the Asunción Bowl junior, which was G1 level event, the level under the junior Grand Slams, Banana and Orange Bowls without losing where he defeated Fernando González in the quarter-finals and Ricardo Mello in the final.

=== 1998–2000 ===
Massa turned professional in 1998, where he started off playing Futures tournaments. His best results of the year were losing in the Peru F3 semi finals to Luis Horna and the quarter-finals of the Resistencia to Guillermo Coria.

In 1999, Massa won his first Futures tournaments in Buenos Aires defeated Martín Vassallo Argüello and Asunción over Leonardo Olguín. Massa played a mix of Futures and Challengers, where he won two Futures events in Argentina and Paraguay, before finishing the season by qualifying for the ATP Challenger event in Buenos Aires, defeating Agustín Calleri in the quarter-finals before losing to Guillermo Coria in the semi-finals.

=== 2001–2003 ===
The 2001 season started slowly for Massa, but in September he won two consecutive Challengers in Florianópolis and São Paulo defeating Gastón Etlis and Martín Vassallo Argüello respectively, before losing to Agustín Calleri in Guadalajara in the following week and Marcelo Ríos in Santiago.

Massa had a poor 2002 and returned to playing Futures events in late 2003 where he won two tournaments defeating Carlos Berlocq in Chile and Diego Hartfield in Uruguay.

=== 2004–2008 ===
2004 saw Massa make the final of the Forest Hills Challenger as a qualifier before retiring against Juan Pablo Guzmán in the final. In September Massa went on a run where he won 15 successive matches, with 14 of them won in straight sets. This run included the Szczecin Challenger where he qualified for the main draw and lost a total of 35 games in the tournament inclusive of the qualifying rounds. He followed that with a tournament victory in Dubrovnik over Tomas Behrend in the final. Massa's last Challenger tournament win was in 2005 in La Serena over Mariano Puerta who would go on to make the Roland Garros final in that season.

Injuries have been a significant factor in Massa's career as a professional. He has suffered three shoulder operations, hip operation, a stress fracture in his right hand. In April 2005, he had an accident in attempting to evade a girl at a tournament, he fell on his right shoulder and it was broken instantly.

Massa's last injury was a hip problem. While the recovery was difficult, he hoped to retire on his own terms and not because of the injuries. His last tournament was 2008 La Serena Open, where he competed in the men's doubles event with Gustavo Marcaccio.

== Singles titles ==
Legend (singles)
Grand Slam (0)
ATP Masters Series (0)
ATP Tour (0)
Challengers (5)
Futures (6)

No.	Date	Tournament	Surface	Opponent	Score
1.	9 August 1999	Buenos Aires	Clay	(Argentina) Martín Vassallo Argüello	6–4, 7–5
2.	11 October 1999	Asunción	Clay	(Argentina) Leonardo Olguín	6–3, 6–3
3.	26 June 2000	Buenos Aires	Clay	(Argentina) Rafael Serpa-Guinazu	6–2, 6–2
4.	16 October 2000	Asunción	Clay	(Argentina) Patricio Arquez	7–5, 6–1
5.	17 September 2001	Florianópolis	Clay	(Argentina) Gastón Etlis	6–3, 7–5
6.	24 September 2001	São Paulo	Clay	(Argentina) Martín Vassallo Argüello	7–6^{(1)}, 6–7^{(5)}, 6–4
7.	29 September 2003	Santiago	Clay	(Argentina) Carlos Berlocq	6–3, 6–7^{(4)}, 6–2
8.	10 November 2003	Montevideo	Clay	(Argentina) Diego Hartfield	6–3, 6–7^{(4)}, 6–2
9.	20 September 2004	Szczecin	Clay	(Spain) David Sánchez	6–2, 6–2
10.	27 September 2004	Dubrovnik	Clay	(Germany) Tomas Behrend	6–3, 7–6^{(3)}
11.	17 January 2005	La Serena	Clay	(Argentina) Mariano Puerta	6–4, 7–6^{(3)}
