= Sebastián Decoud =

Argentine tennis player

- Country (sports): Argentina
- Residence: Bogotá, Colombia
- Born: 18 September 1981 (age 44) Curuzú Cuatiá, Argentina
- Height: 1.77 m (5 ft 10 in)
- Turned pro: 2000
- Plays: Left-handed (single-handed backhand)
- Prize money: $328,980

Singles
- Career record: 4–4
- Career titles: 0
- Highest ranking: No. 132 (17 August 2009)

Grand Slam singles results
- Australian Open: Q1 (2008)
- French Open: 2R (2008)
- Wimbledon: Q1 (2009, 2010)

Doubles
- Career record: 0–0
- Career titles: 0
- Highest ranking: No. 177 (10 May 2010)
- Last updated on: 5 September 2021.

Sebastián Decoud (Spanish pronunciation: [seβasˈtjan deˈku]; born 18 September 1981) is a professional Argentine tennis player.

== Tennis career ==
Decoud was born in Curuzú Cuatiá, Argentina. He starting playing tennis relatively late, taking it up as a 10-year-old.

=== Juniors ===
In his brief career as a junior, he lost his only matches against future top pros Guillermo Coria and Nicolas Mahut, split his two matches with Paul-Henri Mathieu, and won his only encounter with Boris Pašanski.

Decoud reached as high as No. 32 in the junior world singles rankings in 1999.

=== 2000 to 2006 ===
Decoud began playing professionally in 2000, but he progressed very slowly as a pro player. He broke into the top-400 in the world for the first time late in 2006 as a 25-year-old, finishing the year ranked #384.

=== 2007 ===
Decoud made more career progress in 2007, finishing the year at #289. He had moderate success in Futures and Challenger tournaments, and got his ranking high enough to try qualifying at two ATP stops in July, but lost both matches.

=== 2008 ===
Decoud won his first ATP match as a 26-year-old in February 2008 in Brazil. After qualifying into the main draw, he took out #50 José Acasuso in the first round, but then lost to #112 Nicolás Lapentti. That got his ranking to a career-high of #254.

He retired in qualifying the next week in Buenos Aires, with an injury that kept him off the tour for 3 months. But he came back strong in his next two matches, in the qualifying for the French Open, beating #124 Christophe Rochus and making his first Grand Slam main draw as a Lucky loser after losing in the final qualifying round.

== Performance timeline ==
Key
W	F	SF	QF	#R	RR	Q#	DNQ	A	NH

(W) winner; (F) finalist; (SF) semifinalist; (QF) quarterfinalist; (#R) rounds 4, 3, 2, 1; (RR) round-robin stage; (Q#) qualification round; (DNQ) did not qualify; (A) absent; (NH) not held; (SR) strike rate (events won / competed); (W–L) win–loss record.
To avoid confusion and double counting, these charts are updated at the conclusion of a tournament or when the player's participation has ended.

=== Singles ===
Tournament	2008	2009	2010	2011	SR	W–L	Win %
Grand Slam tournaments
Australian Open	Q1	A	A	A	0 / 0	0–0	–
French Open	2R	Q2	Q2	Q2	0 / 1	1–1	50%
Wimbledon	A	Q1	Q1	A	0 / 0	0–0	–
US Open	A	A	A	A	0 / 0	0–0	–
Win–loss	1–1	0–0	0–0	0–0	0 / 1	1–1	50%
ATP World Tour Masters 1000
Indian Wells	A	A	A	Q2	0 / 0	0–0	–
Win–loss	0–0	0–0	0–0	0–0	0 / 0	0–0	–

== ATP Challenger and ITF Futures finals ==
=== Singles: 22 (16–6) ===
Legend ATP Challenger (4–1) ITF Futures (12–5)	Finals by surface Hard (3–0) Clay (13–6) Grass (0–0) Carpet (0–0)

Result	W–L	Date	Tournament	Tier	Surface	Opponent	Score
Win	1–0	Oct 2001	Paraguay F1, Asunción	Futures	Clay	(Chile) Julio Peralta	6–3, 6–1
Loss	1–1	Aug 2002	Spain F11, Irun	Futures	Clay	(Romania) Adrian Cruciat	4–6, 3–6
Win	2–1	Jul 2003	Ecuador F1, Guayaquil	Futures	Hard	(Argentina) Lionel Noviski	6–1, 6–7^{(5–7)}, 7–5
Win	3–1	Jul 2003	Ecuador F3, Villamil	Futures	Hard	(Brazil) Alessandro Camarço	6–3, 6–2
Win	4–1	Sep 2004	Ecuador F3, Guayaquil	Futures	Hard	(United States) Eric Nunez	6–3, 6–4
Win	5–1	Oct 2004	Colombia F3, Medellín	Futures	Clay	(Colombia) Michael Quintero Aguilar	6–4, 7–5
Loss	5–2	Aug 2005	Argentina F8, Buenos Aires	Futures	Clay	(Argentina) Máximo González	6–3, 3–6, 4–6
Loss	5–3	Mar 2006	Argentina F2, Buenos Aires	Futures	Clay	(Argentina) Cristian Villagrán	2–6, 6–2, 4–6
Win	6–3	Apr 2006	Uruguay F1, Punta del Este	Futures	Clay	(Argentina) Diego Cristin	7–5, 6–0
Loss	6–4	Jun 2006	Italy F17, Udine	Futures	Clay	(Italy) Enrico Burzi	1–6, 6–3, 5–7
Loss	6–5	Jul 2006	Germany F9, Espelkamp	Futures	Clay	(Germany) Franz Stauder	4–6, 3–6
Win	7–5	Apr 2007	Italy F11, Padua	Futures	Clay	(Italy) Alberto Brizzi	6–4, 6–7^{(3–7)}, 7–5
Win	8–5	Jul 2007	Constanța, Roumania	Challenger	Clay	(Romania) Victor Crivoi	6–3, 6–3
Win	9–5	Aug 2008	Almaty, Kazakhstan	Challenger	Clay	(United States) Alex Bogomolov Jr.	6–4, 6–2
Win	10–5	Apr 2009	Rome, Italy	Challenger	Clay	(Germany) Simon Greul	7–6^{(7–2)}, 6–1
Loss	10–6	Oct 2009	Quito, Ecuador	Challenger	Clay	(Colombia) Carlos Salamanca	6–7^{(4–7)}, 7–6^{(7–5)}, 4–6
Win	11–6	Aug 2010	Colombia F1, Bogotá	Futures	Clay	(Chile) Guillermo Rivera Aránguiz	6–4, 6–3
Win	12–6	Aug 2010	Colombia F2, Medellín	Futures	Clay	(Chile) Guillermo Rivera Aránguiz	7–6^{(8–6)}, 7–5
Win	13–6	Nov 2010	Peru F1, Arequipa	Futures	Clay	(Peru) Mauricio Echazú	7–6^{(7–4)}, 7–6^{(7–5)}
Win	14–6	Oct 2011	Quito, Ecuador	Challenger	Clay	(Spain) Daniel Muñoz de la Nava	6–3, 7–6^{(7–3)}
Win	15–6	May 2012	Argentina F9, Villa Allende	Futures	Clay	(Argentina) Diego Schwartzman	4–6, 6–4, 6–2
Win	16–6	May 2012	Chile F5, Santiago	Futures	Clay	(Chile) Juan Carlos Sáez	6–2, 6–2

=== Doubles: 39 (20–19) ===
Legend ATP Challenger (5–5) ITF Futures (15–14)	Finals by surface Hard (5–4) Clay (15–15) Grass (0–0) Carpet (0–0)

Result	W–L	Date	Tournament	Tier	Surface	Partner	Opponents	Score
Loss	0–1	Jul 2000	Argentina F7, Concordia	Futures	Clay	(Argentina) Patricio Arquez	(Argentina) Juan Pablo Brzezicki (Argentina) Cristian Villagrán	3–6, 1–6
Win	1–1	Jul 2001	Brazil F5, Curitiba	Futures	Clay	(Argentina) Sebastian Uriarte	(Argentina) Guillermo Carry (Argentina) Marcos Digliodo	3–6, 6–3, 6–4
Win	2–1	Sep 2001	Bolivia F1, La Paz	Futures	Clay	(Argentina) Sebastian Uriarte	(Colombia) Michael Quintero Aguilar (Argentina) Federico Cardinali	6–2, 6–4
Loss	2–2	Oct 2001	Paraguay F1, Asunción	Futures	Clay	(Argentina) Sebastian Uriarte	(Argentina) Diego Hartfield (Argentina) Matias O'Neille	3–6, 6–4, 6–7^{(7–9)}
Win	3–2	Oct 2001	Paraguay F2, Asunción	Futures	Clay	(Argentina) Sebastian Uriarte	(Italy) Gianluca Luddi (Italy) Riccardo Capannelli	6–3, 6–2
Win	4–2	Nov 2001	Brazil F8, Campinas	Futures	Clay	(Argentina) Sebastian Uriarte	(Brazil) Márcio Carlsson (Brazil) Ricardo Schlachter	6–4, 7–6^{(7–2)}
Win	5–2	Mar 2002	Mexico F2, Mexico City	Futures	Hard	(Argentina) Ignacio González King	(Germany) Florian Jeschonek (Germany) Lars Zimmermann	7–5, 6–4
Win	6–2	Jun 2002	Mexico F11, Cancún	Futures	Hard	(Cuba) Lazaro Navarro-Batles	(United States) Alex Bogomolov Jr. (United States) Francisco Montana	walkover
Loss	6–3	Sep 2002	Bolivia F3, Santa Cruz	Futures	Clay	(Chile) Juan-Felipe Yáñez	(Argentina) Ignacio González King (Argentina) Diego Hartfield	5–7, 2–6
Win	7–3	Apr 2003	Chile F1, Santiago	Futures	Clay	(Chile) Patricio Arquez	(Argentina) Francisco Cabello (Chile) Adrián García	6–2, 7–6^{(8–6)}
Loss	7–4	Jun 2003	Mexico F9, Chetumal, Quintana Roo	Futures	Hard	(Chile) Paul Capdeville	(Japan) Toshihide Matsui (Japan) Michihisa Onoda	3–6, 4–6
Win	8–4	Jul 2003	Ecuador F1, Guayaquil	Futures	Hard	(Colombia) Pablo González	(Argentina) Juan-Martín Aranguren (Argentina) Diego Cristin	6–4, 7–5
Win	9–4	Jul 2003	Ecuador F3, Villamil	Futures	Hard	(Bolivia) Javier Taborga	(Venezuela) Juan de Armas (Venezuela) Jhonnatan Medina-Álvarez	4–6, 7–5, 7–6^{(7–2)}
Loss	9–5	Aug 2003	Argentina F1, Buenos Aires	Futures	Clay	(Argentina) Patricio Arquez	(Argentina) Brian Dabul (Argentina) Carlos Berlocq	2–6, 3–6
Loss	9–6	Sep 2003	Bolivia F2, La Paz	Futures	Clay	(Argentina) Patricio Arquez	(Bolivia) Javier Taborga (Colombia) Pablo González	6–7^{(1–7)}, 2–6
Win	10–6	Oct 2003	Colombia F1, Medellín	Futures	Clay	(Bolivia) Javier Taborga	(Argentina) Carlos Berlocq (Brazil) Ronaldo Carvalho	7–6^{(7–3)}, 7–6^{(7–4)}
Loss	10–7	Nov 2003	Uruguay F1, Montevideo	Futures	Clay	(Argentina) Diego Hartfield	(Argentina) Gustavo Marcaccio (Argentina) Patricio Rudi	4–6, 4–6
Loss	10–8	May 2004	Argentina F1, Buenos Aires	Futures	Clay	(Argentina) Alejandro Fabbri	(Argentina) Lionel Noviski (Argentina) Agustin Tarantino	1–6, 0–6
Loss	10–9	May 2004	Argentina F2, Buenos Aires	Futures	Clay	(Argentina) Juan-Martín Aranguren	(Argentina) Eduardo Schwank (Argentina) Juan-Pablo Amado	1–6, 6–7^{(6–8)}
Loss	10–10	Sep 2004	Ecuador F2, Guayaquil	Futures	Hard	(Colombia) Pablo González	(United States) Levar Harper-Griffith (Netherlands Antilles) Jean-Julien Rojer	6–2, 5–7, 3–6
Loss	10–11	Jan 2005	Colombia F1, Cartagena	Futures	Hard	(Colombia) Pablo González	(Colombia) Rubén Torres (United States) Shuon Madden	5–7, 4–6
Loss	10–12	Feb 2005	Colombia F2, Bucaramanga	Futures	Clay	(Colombia) Pablo González	(Brazil) Alexandre Bonatto (Brazil) Marcelo Melo	4–6, 4–6
Win	11–12	Mar 2006	Argentina F1, Buenos Aires	Futures	Clay	(Argentina) Antonio Pastorino	(Argentina) Guillermo Carry (Argentina) Jonathan Gonzalia	6–4, 6–4
Win	12–12	Apr 2006	Argentina F4, Buenos Aires	Futures	Clay	(Argentina) Eduardo Schwank	(Argentina) Leandro Migani (Argentina) Horacio Zeballos	6–2, 6–2
Win	13–12	Sep 2006	Brazil F12, Caldas Novas	Futures	Hard	(Argentina) Leonardo Mayer	(Brazil) Frederico Casaro (United States) Mashiska Washington	6–4, 7–5
Loss	13–13	Feb 2007	Colombia F2, Bucaramanga	Futures	Clay	(Argentina) Alejandro Fabbri	(Colombia) Juan Sebastián Cabal (Colombia) Carlos Salamanca	4–6, 4–6
Win	14–13	Aug 2007	Graz, Austria	Challenger	Clay	(Russia) Yuri Schukin	(France) Jérémy Chardy (North Macedonia) Predrag Rusevski	3–6, 6–3, [10–7]
Win	15–13	Aug 2007	Geneva, Switzerland	Challenger	Clay	(Russia) Yuri Schukin	(France) Olivier Charroin (United States) James Cerretani	6–3, 6–7^{(4–7)}, [10–4]
Loss	15–14	Jan 2008	La Serena, Chile	Challenger	Clay	(Argentina) Cristian Villagrán	(Ecuador) Nicolás Lapentti (Argentina) Eduardo Schwank	4–6, 0–6
Loss	15–15	Mar 2008	Salinas, Ecuador	Challenger	Hard	(Belgium) Dick Norman	(Brazil) Caio Zampieri (Brazil) Júlio Silva	6–7^{(6–8)}, 2–6
Win	16–15	Nov 2008	Guayaquil, Ecuador	Challenger	Clay	(Colombia) Santiago Giraldo	(Brazil) Ricardo Hocevar (Brazil) Thiago Alves	6–4, 6–4
Win	17–15	Jul 2009	Rijeka, Croatia	Challenger	Clay	(Spain) Miguel Ángel López Jaén	(Croatia) Ivan Dodig (Croatia) Antonio Veić	7–6^{(9–7)}, 3–6, [10–8]
Loss	17–16	Sep 2009	Bogotá, Colombia	Challenger	Clay	(Argentina) Diego Álvarez	(Colombia) Alejandro Falla (Colombia) Alejandro González	7–5, 4–6, [8–10]
Win	18–16	Nov 2009	Medellín, Colombia	Challenger	Clay	(Argentina) Eduardo Schwank	(Argentina) Diego Junqueira (Spain) David Marrero	6–0, 6–2
Loss	18–17	May 2010	San Remo, Italy	Challenger	Clay	(Argentina) Carlos Berlocq	(Argentina) Diego Junqueira (Argentina) Martín Vassallo Argüello	6–2, 4–6, [8–10]
Loss	18–18	Apr 2012	Pereira, Colombia	Challenger	Clay	(Spain) Rubén Ramírez Hidalgo	(Argentina) Guido Pella (Argentina) Martín Alund	3–6, 6–2, [5–10]
Win	19–18	May 2012	Argentina F9, Villa Allende	Futures	Clay	(Argentina) Diego Schwartzman	(Argentina) Juan Ignacio Londero (Argentina) Leandro Migani	6–3, 6–4
Win	20–18	May 2012	Chile F5, Santiago	Futures	Clay	(Argentina) Matias Salinas	(United States) Reid Carleton (United States) Daniel Stahl	6–2, 6–4
Loss	20–19	Jun 2012	Chile F7, Concón	Futures	Clay	(Argentina) Federico Coria	(Chile) Jorge Aguilar (Chile) Juan Carlos Sáez	1–6, 2–6
