= 2009 Open Barletta – Città della Disfida =

- Date: March 23 – March 29
- Edition: 13th
- Location: Barletta, Italy

Champions

Singles
- (Czech Republic) Ivo Minář

Doubles
- (Spain) Rubén Ramírez Hidalgo / (Spain) Santiago Ventura
← 2008 ·	Open Barletta – Città della Disfida	· 2010 →

The 2009 Open Barletta – Città della Disfida was a professional tennis tournament played on outdoor red clay courts. It was part of the 2009 ATP Challenger Tour. It took place in Barletta, Italy between 23 and 29 March 2009.

== Singles entrants ==
=== Seeds ===
Nationality	Player	Ranking*	Seeding
ESP	Daniel Gimeno Traver	78	1
CZE	Ivo Minář	157	2
UZB	Denis Istomin	102	3
BRA	Marcos Daniel	114	4
ESP	Rubén Ramírez Hidalgo	122	5
ESP	Santiago Ventura	126	6
URU	Pablo Cuevas	130	7
PER	Luis Horna	131	8

- Rankings are as of March 16, 2009.

=== Other entrants ===
The following players received wildcards into the singles main draw:

- (Italy) Daniele Bracciali
- (Italy) Alessio di Mauro
- (Italy) Thomas Fabbiano
- (Italy) Gianluca Naso

The following players received entry from the qualifying draw:

- (Italy) Alberto Brizzi
- (France) Jonathan Eysseric
- (Netherlands) Matwé Middelkoop
- (Netherlands) Nick van der Meer

The following player received special exempt into the main draw:

- (Netherlands) Thiemo de Bakker
- (Spain) David Marrero

== Champions ==
=== Men's singles ===
(Czech Republic) Ivo Minář def. (Spain) Santiago Ventura, 6–4, 6–3

=== Men's doubles ===
(Spain) Rubén Ramírez Hidalgo / (Spain) Santiago Ventura def. (Uruguay) Pablo Cuevas / (Peru) Luis Horna, 7–6(1), 6–2
