= 2008 Brasil Open – Singles =

Singles
- 2008 Brasil Open

Final
- Champion: (Spain) Nicolás Almagro
- Runner-up: (Spain) Carlos Moyá
- Score: 7–6^{(7–4)}, 3–6, 7–5

Details
- Draw: 32
- Seeds: 8

Events
Singles	Doubles
- Brasil Open

Guillermo Cañas was the defending champion but chose not to participate that year.

Nicolás Almagro won in the final 7–6^{(7–4)}, 3–6, 7–5, against Carlos Moyá.

== Seeds ==
1. (Spain) Carlos Moyá (final)
2. (Spain) Nicolás Almagro (champion)
3. (Russia) Igor Andreev (first round)
4. (Italy) Potito Starace (first round)
5. (Italy) Filippo Volandri (quarterfinals)
6. (Argentina) Agustín Calleri (first round)
7. (Argentina) José Acasuso (first round)
8. (Spain) Albert Montañés (second round)

== Draw ==
Key

- Q = Qualifier
- WC = Wild card
- LL = Lucky loser
- Alt = Alternate
- ITF = ITF entry
- PR = Protected ranking
- SR = Special ranking
- SE = Special exempt
- JE = Junior exempt
- JR = Junior Accelerator Programme entrant
- CO = College Accelerator Programme entrant
- NG = Next Gen Accelerator Program entrant
- w/o = Walkover
- r = Retired
- d = Defaulted

=== Finals ===
Semifinals
1	(Spain) Carlos Moyá	6	3	7^{7}
(Ecuador) Nicolás Lapentti	2	6	6^{5}
(Italy) Fabio Fognini	1	1
2	(Spain) Nicolás Almagro	6	6

Final
1	(Spain) Carlos Moyá	6^{4}	6	5
2	(Spain) Nicolás Almagro	7^{7}	3	7

=== Top half ===
First round
1	(Spain) C Moyá	6	4	6
(Spain) S Ventura	4	6	4
(France) O Patience	6	7
(Argentina) JP Brzezicki	3	5
(Spain) Ó Hernández	7^{7}	6
(Uruguay) P Cuevas	6^{5}	4
(Argentina) S Roitman	6	6
6	(Argentina) A Calleri	3	2
3	(Russia) I Andreev	3	2
Q	(Argentina) E Schwank	6	6
(Australia) P Luczak	7	6
WC	(Brazil) M Daniel	5	4
(Ecuador) N Lapentti	6	6
WC	(Brazil) T Bellucci	2	2
Q	(Argentina) S Decoud	6	1	7^{7}
7	(Argentina) J Acasuso	3	6	6^{3}

Second round
1	(Spain) C Moyá	5	6	6
(France) O Patience	7	1	0
(Spain) Ó Hernández	6	2	6
(Argentina) S Roitman	3	6	4
Q	(Argentina) E Schwank	6	6
(Australia) P Luczak	2	2
(Ecuador) N Lapentti	6	6
Q	(Argentina) S Decoud	1	2

Quarterfinals
1	(Spain) C Moyá	6	3	7
(Spain) Ó Hernández	3	6	5
Q	(Argentina) E Schwank	6	4	6^{4}
(Ecuador) N Lapentti	1	6	7^{7}

Semifinals
1	(Spain) C Moyá	6	3	7^{7}
(Ecuador) N Lapentti	2	6	6^{5}

=== Bottom half ===
First round
8	(Spain) Montañés	6	6
(France) N Devilder	4	4
(Czech Republic) J Vaněk	3	7^{7}	6^{3}
(Italy) F Fognini	6	6^{4}	7^{7}
WC	(Brazil) G Kuerten	5	1
(Argentina) C Berlocq	7	6
(Czech Republic) I Minář	6	4	6
4	(Italy) P Starace	4	6	2
5	(Italy) F Volandri	6	6
Q	(Spain) D Muñoz de la Nava	2	4
(Argentina) G Coria	6	7
Q	(Italy) F Aldi	4	5
(Serbia) B Pašanski	6	6
(Argentina) M Vassallo Argüello	4	4
(Chile) N Massú	3	2
2	(Spain) N Almagro	6	6

Second round
8	(Spain) Montañés	5	3
(Italy) F Fognini	7	6
(Argentina) C Berlocq	4	4
(Czech Republic) I Minář	6	6
5	(Italy) F Volandri	6	6
(Argentina) G Coria	1	2
(Serbia) B Pašanski	2	3
2	(Spain) N Almagro	6	6

Quarterfinals
(Italy) F Fognini	6^{2}	6	6
(Czech Republic) I Minář	7^{7}	2	3
5	(Italy) F Volandri	5	6	1
2	(Spain) N Almagro	7	2	6

Semifinals
(Italy) F Fognini	1	1
2	(Spain) N Almagro	6	6
