= 2010 Zagreb Open =

- Date: May 10–16, 2010
- Edition: 15th
- Location: Zagreb, Croatia

Champions

Singles
- (Kazakhstan) Yuri Schukin

Doubles
- (Germany) Andre Begemann / (Australia) Matthew Ebden
| ← 2009 · | Zagreb Open | · 2011 → |

The 2010 Zagreb Open was a professional tennis tournament played on outdoor red clay courts. It was part of the 2010 ATP Challenger Tour. It took place in Zagreb, Croatia between May 10 and May 16, 2010.

== Entrants ==
=== Seeds ===
| Nationality | Player | Ranking* | Seeding |
|---|---|---|---|
| BRA | Marcos Daniel | 91 | 1 |
| CHI | Nicolás Massú | 92 | 2 |
| SLO | Blaž Kavčič | 101 | 3 |
| AUT | Daniel Köllerer | 106 | 4 |
| IND | Somdev Devvarman | 109 | 5 |
| ESP | Rubén Ramírez Hidalgo | 119 | 6 |
| ESP | Santiago Ventura Bertomeu | 137 | 7 |
| SLO | Grega Žemlja | 140 | 8 |

- Rankings are as of May 3, 2010.

=== Other entrants ===
The following players received wildcards into the singles main draw:

- (Argentina) Gastón Gaudio
- (Croatia) Nikola Mektić
- (Australia) Bernard Tomic
- (Croatia) Antonio Veić

The following players received entry from the qualifying draw:

- (Hungary) Attila Balázs
- (Russia) Ilya Belyaev
- (Russia) Andrey Kuznetsov
- (Croatia) Antonio Sančić

The following player received special exempt into the main draw:

- (Czech Republic) Ivo Minář

== Champions ==
=== Singles ===
(Kazakhstan) Yuri Schukin def. (Spain) Santiago Ventura, 6–3, 7–5

=== Doubles ===
(Germany) Andre Begemann / (Australia) Matthew Ebden def. (Spain) Rubén Ramírez Hidalgo / (Spain) Santiago Ventura, 7–6(5), 5–7, [10–3]
