= 2009 Open Barletta – Città della Disfida – Doubles =

Città della Disfida – Doubles
- 2009 Open Barletta – Città della Disfida

Final
- Champions: (Spain) Rubén Ramírez Hidalgo (Spain) Santiago Ventura
- Runners-up: (Uruguay) Pablo Cuevas (Peru) Luis Horna
- Score: 7–6(1), 6–2

Events
Singles	Doubles
← 2008 ·	Open Barletta – Città della Disfida	· 2010 →

Flavio Cipolla and Marcel Granollers were the defending champions, however he didn't defend their title.
Rubén Ramírez Hidalgo and Santiago Ventura won in the final 7–6(1), 6–2, against Pablo Cuevas and Luis Horna.

== Seeds ==
1. (Uruguay) Pablo Cuevas / (Peru) Luis Horna (final)
2. (Switzerland) Yves Allegro / (Romania) Horia Tecău (semifinals)
3. (Spain) Rubén Ramírez Hidalgo / (Spain) Santiago Ventura (champions)
4. (Brazil) Marcos Daniel / (Germany) Frank Moser (first round)

== Draw ==
=== Key ===
- Q = Qualifier
- WC = Wild card
- LL = Lucky loser
- Alt = Alternate
- SE = Special exempt
- PR = Protected ranking
- ITF = ITF entry
- JE = Junior exempt
- w/o = Walkover
- r = Retired
- d = Defaulted
- SR = Special ranking

=== Draw ===
First round
1	(Uruguay) P Cuevas (Peru) L Horna	6	6
(Italy) F Colangelo (Italy) M Crugnola	3	4
WC	(Italy) D Bracciali (Italy) M Trevisan	7	6
(Serbia) B Pašanski (Kazakhstan) Y Schukin	6^{4}	4
4	(Brazil) M Daniel (Germany) F Moser	6	3	[5]
(Spain) D Marrero (Peru) I Miranda	3	6	[10]
ALT	(Argentina) S Roitman (Spain) JA Sánchez-de Luna	1	r
(Argentina) JP Brzezicki (Italy) T Tenconi	2
(Spain) D Gimeno-Traver (Spain) D Muñoz-De La Nava	6	7
(Uzbekistan) D Istomin (France) A Sidorenko	4	6^{4}
WC	(Italy) F Aldi (Italy) G Naso	1	6	[6]
3	(Spain) R Ramírez Hidalgo (Spain) S Ventura	6	3	[10]
(Algeria) L Ouahab (Spain) P Riba	6	6
WC	(Italy) A di Mauro (Italy) G Petrazzuolo	2	2
(Czech Republic) D Karol (Czech Republic) I Minář	4	0
2	(Switzerland) Y Allegro (Romania) H Tecău	6	6

Quarterfinals
1	(Uruguay) P Cuevas (Peru) L Horna	6	2	[10]
WC	(Italy) D Bracciali (Italy) M Trevisan	4	6	[3]
(Spain) D Marrero (Peru) I Miranda	6	6^{1}	[8]
(Argentina) JP Brzezicki (Italy) T Tenconi	2	7	[10]
(Spain) D Gimeno-Traver (Spain) D Muñoz-De La Nava	4	1
3	(Spain) R Ramírez Hidalgo (Spain) S Ventura	6	6
(Algeria) L Ouahab (Spain) P Riba	4	1
2	(Switzerland) Y Allegro (Romania) H Tecău	6	6

Semifinals
1	(Uruguay) P Cuevas (Peru) L Horna	6	6
(Argentina) JP Brzezicki (Italy) T Tenconi	2	2
3	(Spain) R Ramírez Hidalgo (Spain) S Ventura	7	6
2	(Switzerland) Y Allegro (Romania) H Tecău	5	4

Finals
1	(Uruguay) P Cuevas (Peru) L Horna	6^{1}	2
3	(Spain) R Ramírez Hidalgo (Spain) S Ventura	7	6

== Sources ==
- Main Draw
