= 2009 Seguros Bolívar Open Bogotá – Doubles =

Doubles
- 2009 Seguros Bolívar Open Bogotá

Final
- Champions: (Argentina) Sebastián Prieto (Argentina) Horacio Zeballos
- Runners-up: (Brazil) Marcos Daniel (Brazil) Ricardo Mello
- Score: 6–4, 7–5

Events
Singles	Doubles
← 2008 ·	Seguros Bolívar Open Bogotá	· 2010 →

Xavier Malisse and Carlos Salamanca were the champions in 2008, but Malisse chose to not start this year.
Salamanca partnered up with Santiago Giraldo - they lost to Sebastián Prieto and Horacio Zeballos in the first round.
First-seeded Prieto and Zeballos won this tournament - they defeated Marcos Daniel and Ricardo Mello in the final 6–4, 7–5.

== Seeds ==
1. (Argentina) S Prieto / (Argentina) Horacio Zeballos (champions)
2. (Colombia) Juan Sebastián Cabal / (Colombia) Alejandro Falla (semifinals)
3. (Argentina) Brian Dabul / (Uruguay) Marcel Felder (quarterfinals)

== Draw ==
=== Key ===
- Q = Qualifier
- WC = Wild card
- LL = Lucky loser
- Alt = Alternate
- SE = Special exempt
- PR = Protected ranking
- ITF = ITF entry
- JE = Junior exempt
- w/o = Walkover
- r = Retired
- d = Defaulted
- SR = Special ranking

=== Draw ===
First round
1	(Argentina) S Prieto (Argentina) H Zeballos	4	6	[10]
(Colombia) S Giraldo (Colombia) C Salamanca	6	2	[5]
(Brazil) R Hocevar (Brazil) A Miele	4	5
(Argentina) D Álvarez (United Kingdom) J Ward	6	7
(Ecuador) G Lapentti (Spain) F Vicente	6	6
WC	(Denmark) K Pless (Colombia) M Quintero	3	2
(Mexico) B Echagaray (Dominican Republic) V Estrella	6	6
(Argentina) S Decoud (Spain) MÁ López Jaén	4	4
(Brazil) M Daniel (Brazil) R Mello	6	6
(Argentina) J-M Aranguren (Argentina) A Fabbri	3	2
WC	(Venezuela) R Corrente (Colombia) S Galán	3	3
3	(Argentina) B Dabul (Uruguay) M Felder	6	6
(Mexico) S González (Argentina) M Puerta	4	2
WC	(Colombia) A González (Colombia) E Struvay	6	6
(Argentina) A Calleri (Chile) N Massú	4	6	[6]
2	(Colombia) JS Cabal (Colombia) A Falla	6	4	[10]

Quarterfinals
1	(Argentina) S Prieto (Argentina) H Zeballos	6	6
(Argentina) D Álvarez (United Kingdom) J Ward	4	1
(Ecuador) G Lapentti (Spain) F Vicente	6	7
(Mexico) B Echagaray (Dominican Republic) V Estrella	1	5
(Brazil) M Daniel (Brazil) R Mello	7	6
3	(Argentina) B Dabul (Uruguay) M Felder	6^{5}	4
WC	(Colombia) A González (Colombia) E Struvay	6^{6}	6	[8]
2	(Colombia) JS Cabal (Colombia) A Falla	7	4	[10]

Semifinals
1	(Argentina) S Prieto (Argentina) H Zeballos	6	7
(Ecuador) G Lapentti (Spain) F Vicente	3	5
(Brazil) M Daniel (Brazil) R Mello	7	6
2	(Colombia) JS Cabal (Colombia) A Falla	6^{5}	4

Finals
1	(Argentina) S Prieto (Argentina) H Zeballos	6	7
(Brazil) M Daniel (Brazil) R Mello	4	5
