= 2008 Brasil Open =

- Date: 11–17 February
- Edition: 8th
- Category: International Series
- Draw: 32S / 16D
- Prize money: $485,000
- Surface: Clay / outdoor
- Location: Mata de São João, Brazil

Champions

Singles
- (Spain) Nicolás Almagro

Doubles
- (Brazil) Marcelo Melo / (Brazil) André Sá
- Brasil Open

The 2008 Brasil Open was a men's tennis tournament played on outdoor clay courts. It was the 8th edition of the Brasil Open, and was part of the International Series of the 2008 ATP Tour. It took place in Costa do Sauípe resort, Mata de São João, Brazil, from 11 February through 17 February 2008.

The singles draw featured former world No. 1 and Chennai semifinalist Carlos Moyá, 2007 Cincinnati Masters quarterfinalist Nicolás Almagro, and 2007 Moscow and 2007 Metz quarterfinalist Igor Andreev. Also present were 2007 St. Petersburg quarterfinalist Potito Starace, 2007 Rome Masters semifinalist Filippo Volandri, Agustín Calleri, José Acasuso and Albert Montañés.

== Finals ==
=== Singles ===
(Spain) Nicolás Almagro defeated (Spain) Carlos Moyá, 7–6^{(7–4)}, 3–6, 7–5

- It was Nicolás Almagro's 1st title of the year, and his 3rd overall.

=== Doubles ===
(Brazil) Marcelo Melo / (Brazil) André Sá defeated (Spain) Albert Montañés / (Spain) Santiago Ventura, 4–6, 6–2, [10–7]
