= 2010 Seguros Bolívar Open Bogotá – Men's singles =

Men's singles
- 2010 Seguros Bolívar Open Bogotá

Final
- Champion: (Colombia) Robert Farah
- Runner-up: (Colombia) Carlos Salamanca
- Score: 6–3, 2–6, 7–6(3)

Events
Singles	men	women
Doubles	men	women
← 2009 ·	Seguros Bolívar Open Bogotá	· 2011 →

Marcos Daniel was the defending champion, but he withdrew before his match against Sebastián Decoud in the quarterfinals.
Robert Farah won in the final 6–3, 2–6, 7–6(3), against Carlos Salamanca.

== Seeds ==
1. (Colombia) Santiago Giraldo (quarterfinals)
2. (Colombia) Alejandro Falla (first round)
3. (Brazil) Marcos Daniel (quarterfinals, withdrew due to back pain)
4. (Chile) Nicolás Massú (first round)
5. (Brazil) João Souza (first round)
6. (Germany) Andre Begemann (first round)
7. (Colombia) Carlos Salamanca (final)
8. (Mexico) Santiago González (first round, retired due to a right hand injury)

== Draw ==
=== Key ===
- Q = Qualifier
- WC = Wild card
- LL = Lucky loser
- Alt = Alternate
- SE = Special exempt
- PR = Protected ranking
- ITF = ITF entry
- JE = Junior exempt
- w/o = Walkover
- r = Retired
- d = Defaulted
- SR = Special ranking

=== Finals ===
Semifinals
7	(Colombia) Carlos Salamanca	6	6^{6}	7
(Argentina) Sebastián Decoud	3	7	6^{4}
(Colombia) Juan Sebastián Cabal	5	1
WC	(Colombia) Robert Farah	7	6

Final
7	(Colombia) Carlos Salamanca	3	6	6^{3}
WC	(Colombia) Robert Farah	6	2	7

=== Top half ===
First round
1	(Colombia) S Giraldo	3	7	6
(Italy) M Viola	6	5	3
(Brazil) R Hocevar	6	6
Q	(Argentina) G Durán	4	4
WC	(Italy) R Livi	4	0
(Chile) A García	6	6
(Spain) C Poch-Gradin	1	2
7	(Colombia) C Salamanca	6	6
3	(Brazil) M Daniel	6	6
(Portugal) L Tavares	1	2
(Argentina) J-M Valverde	6	3	4
Q	(Ecuador) I Endara	4	6	6
(Germany) G Kretschmer	4	6	4
(Argentina) S Decoud	6	2	6
Q	(Ecuador) JC Campozano	4
8	(Mexico) S González	1	r

Second round
1	(Colombia) S Giraldo	7	6
(Brazil) R Hocevar	5	3
(Chile) A García	2	6^{4}
7	(Colombia) C Salamanca	6	7
3	(Brazil) M Daniel	3	6	6
Q	(Ecuador) I Endara	6	4	4
(Argentina) S Decoud	6	4	7
Q	(Ecuador) JC Campozano	4	6	6^{6}

Quarterfinals
1	(Colombia) S Giraldo	4	6^{3}
7	(Colombia) C Salamanca	6	7
3	(Brazil) M Daniel	w/o
(Argentina) S Decoud

Semifinals
7	(Colombia) C Salamanca	6	6^{6}	7
(Argentina) S Decoud	3	7	6^{4}

=== Bottom half ===
First round
6	(Germany) A Begemann	4	2
(Colombia) JS Cabal	6	6
(Argentina) F Bagnis	6	4	6
Q	(United States) T Trombetta	4	6	3
(Brazil) R Dutra da Silva	6	6
(Argentina) A Molteni	4	4
WC	(Colombia) E Struvay	3	6	6
4/WC	(Chile) N Massú	6	1	1
5	(Brazil) J Souza	4	3
(Colombia) A González	6	6
(Dominican Republic) V Estrella	3	3
(Germany) A Satschko	6	6
WC	(Colombia) R Farah	6	6
(Ecuador) G Lapentti	3	2
(Chile) P Capdeville	6	6
2	(Colombia) A Falla	4	3

Second round
(Colombia) JS Cabal	6	1	6
(Argentina) F Bagnis	4	6	4
(Brazil) R Dutra da Silva	2	6^{0}
WC	(Colombia) E Struvay	6	7
(Colombia) A González	4	6	6
(Germany) A Satschko	6	3	4
WC	(Colombia) R Farah	7	6
(Chile) P Capdeville	6^{2}	3

Quarterfinals
(Colombia) JS Cabal	6	6
WC	(Colombia) E Struvay	4	4
(Colombia) A González	3	2
WC	(Colombia) R Farah	6	6

Semifinals
(Colombia) JS Cabal	5	1
WC	(Colombia) R Farah	7	6
