= 2009 Zagreb Open – Doubles =

Doubles
- 2009 Zagreb Open

Final
- Champions: (Australia) Peter Luczak (Italy) Alessandro Motti
- Runners-up: (United States) Brendan Evans (United States) Ryan Sweeting
- Score: 6–4, 6–4

Events
Singles	Doubles
← 2008 ·	Zagreb Open	· 2010 →

Ivan Dodig and Júlio Silva were the defending champions, however only Dodig chose to play this year. He competed with Lovro Zovko. They lost to Brian Dabul and Leonardo Mayer in the first round.
Peter Luczak and Alessandro Motti won in the final 6–4, 6–4, against Brendan Evans and Ryan Sweeting.

== Seeds ==
1. (United Kingdom) Jamie Murray / (Czech Republic) Pavel Vízner (first round)
2. (United States) David Martin / (Slovakia) Igor Zelenay (quarterfinals)
3. (Argentina) Brian Dabul / (Argentina) Leonardo Mayer (quarterfinals)
4. (Slovakia) Dominik Hrbatý / (Czech Republic) Dušan Karol (first round)

== Draw ==
=== Key ===
- Q = Qualifier
- WC = Wild card
- LL = Lucky loser
- Alt = Alternate
- SE = Special exempt
- PR = Protected ranking
- ITF = ITF entry
- JE = Junior exempt
- w/o = Walkover
- r = Retired
- d = Defaulted
- SR = Special ranking

=== Draw ===
First round
1	(United Kingdom) J Murray (Czech Republic) P Vízner	2	6^{5}
(Australia) P Luczak (Italy) A Motti	6	7
WC	(Croatia) M Bradarić (Croatia) A Nakić-Alfirević	6	3	[9]
(Serbia) I Bozoljac (Spain) P Riba	3	6	[11]
3	(Argentina) B Dabul (Argentina) L Mayer	6	6
(Croatia) I Dodig (Argentina) L Mayer	3	3
(Brazil) M Daniel (Brazil) R Hocevar	7	7
WC	(Croatia) N Mektić (Croatia) I Zovko	5	5
(Brazil) T Alves (Brazil) R Mello	6	6
(United States) A Delic (United States) R Kendrick	2	3
WC	(Croatia) F Škugor (Croatia) A Veić	4	6	[10]
4	(Slovakia) D Hrbatý (Czech Republic) D Karol	6	2	[3]
(Croatia) R Karanušić (Serbia) B Pašanski	1	4
(United States) B Evans (United States) R Sweeting	6	6
(Netherlands) J Huta Galung (Spain) D Muñoz-De La Nava	6^{5}	7	[7]
2	(United States) D Martin (Slovakia) I Zelenay	7	5	[10]

Quarterfinals
(Australia) P Luczak (Italy) A Motti	6	6
(Serbia) I Bozoljac (Spain) P Riba	4	3
3	(Argentina) B Dabul (Argentina) L Mayer	6	6^{1}	[6]
(Brazil) M Daniel (Brazil) R Hocevar	0	7	[10]
(Brazil) T Alves (Brazil) R Mello
WC	(Croatia) F Škugor (Croatia) A Veić	w/o
(United States) B Evans (United States) R Sweeting	7	6
2	(United States) D Martin (Slovakia) I Zelenay	6^{8}	4

Semifinals
(Australia) P Luczak (Italy) A Motti	4	6	[10]
(Brazil) M Daniel (Brazil) R Hocevar	6	3	[4]
WC	(Croatia) F Škugor (Croatia) A Veić
(United States) B Evans (United States) R Sweeting	w/o

Finals
(Australia) P Luczak (Italy) A Motti	6	6
(United States) B Evans (United States) R Sweeting	4	4
