= 2009 Seguros Bolívar Open Bogotá – Singles =

Singles
- 2009 Seguros Bolívar Open Bogotá

Final
- Champion: (Brazil) Marcos Daniel
- Runner-up: (Argentina) Horacio Zeballos
- Score: 4–6, 7–6(5), 6–4

Events
Singles	Doubles
← 2008 ·	Seguros Bolívar Open Bogotá	· 2010 →

Mariano Puerta didn't defend his last year title. He lost to Ricardo Hocevar in the first round.
Marcos Daniel won against Horacio Zeballos in the final 4–6, 7–6(5), 6–4.

== Seeds ==
1. (Chile) Nicolás Massú (quarterfinals)
2. (Argentina) Brian Dabul (quarterfinals)
3. (Brazil) Marcos Daniel (champion)
4. (Colombia) Santiago Giraldo (quarterfinals)
5. (Argentina) Horacio Zeballos (final)
6. (Argentina) Sebastián Decoud (semifinals)
7. (Brazil) Ricardo Hocevar (quarterfinals)
8. (Argentina) Agustín Calleri (first round)

== Draw ==
=== Key ===
- Q = Qualifier
- WC = Wild card
- LL = Lucky loser
- Alt = Alternate
- SE = Special exempt
- PR = Protected ranking
- ITF = ITF entry
- JE = Junior exempt
- w/o = Walkover
- r = Retired
- d = Defaulted
- SR = Special ranking

=== Final four ===
Semifinals
5	(Argentina) Horacio Zeballos	7	6
6	(Argentina) Sebastián Decoud	6^{6}	3
3	(Brazil) Marcos Daniel	6	7
(Mexico) Santiago González	3	6^{4}

Final
5	(Argentina) Horacio Zeballos	6	6^{5}	4
3	(Brazil) Marcos Daniel	4	7	6

=== Top half ===
First round
1	(Chile) N Massú	6	7
Q	(Denmark) K Pless	4	6^{3}
WC	(Venezuela) R Corrente	2	0
(Ecuador) G Lapentti	6	6
(Argentina) D Álvarez	6	6
Q	(Brazil) A Miele	1	4
Q	(Uruguay) M Felder	4	2
5	(Argentina) H Zeballos	6	6
4	(Colombia) S Giraldo	7	3	6
(Brazil) C Zampieri	6^{2}	6	3
(Argentina) M Alund	3	6^{5}
WC	(Colombia) C Salamanca	6	7
(Mexico) B Echagaray	6	7
(Spain) MÁ López Jaén	2	6^{2}
(United Kingdom) J Ward	5	4
6	(Argentina) S Decoud	7	6

Second round
1	(Chile) N Massú	3	7	6
(Ecuador) G Lapentti	6	6^{2}	4
Q	(Argentina) D Álvarez	3	6	6^{5}
5	(Argentina) H Zeballos	6	4	7
4	(Colombia) S Giraldo	7	6^{4}	7
WC	(Colombia) C Salamanca	6^{3}	7	6^{2}
(Mexico) B Echagaray	4	2	d
6	(Argentina) S Decoud	6	3

Quarterfinals
1	(Chile) N Massú	7	1	4
5	(Argentina) H Zeballos	6^{6}	6	6
4	(Colombia) S Giraldo	6^{3}	4
6	(Argentina) S Decoud	7	6

Semifinals
5	(Argentina) H Zeballos	7	6
6	(Argentina) S Decoud	6^{6}	3

=== Bottom half ===
First round
7	(Brazil) R Hocevar	7	7
(Argentina) M Puerta	6^{4}	6^{3}
(Canada) P Polansky	2	7	3
(Colombia) A Falla	6	6^{5}	6
Q	(Colombia) E Struvay	6^{1}	6	4
(Argentina) M Zabaleta	7	4	6
(Spain) F Vicente	6^{4}	4
3	(Brazil) M Daniel	7	6
8	(Argentina) A Calleri	6	3	4
(Mexico) S González	3	6	6
WC	(Colombia) JS Cabal	4	4
WC	(Colombia) A González	6	6
(Brazil) R Mello	4	6	5
(Dominican Republic) V Estrella	6	4	7
(Brazil) J Silva	3	4	r
2	(Argentina) B Dabul	6	2

Second round
7	(Brazil) R Hocevar	6	3	6
(Colombia) A Falla	3	6	3
(Argentina) M Zabaleta	6^{5}	7	3
3	(Brazil) M Daniel	7	6^{2}	6
(Mexico) S González	3	6	7
WC	(Colombia) A González	6	3	6^{6}
(Dominican Republic) V Estrella	5	3
2	(Argentina) B Dabul	7	6

Quarterfinals
7	(Brazil) R Hocevar	6^{5}	2
3	(Brazil) M Daniel	7	6
(Mexico) S González	6	6
2	(Argentina) B Dabul	3	4

Semifinals
3	(Brazil) M Daniel	6	7
(Mexico) S González	3	6^{4}
