= 2010 Seguros Bolívar Open Bogotá – Women's singles =

Women's singles
- 2010 Seguros Bolívar Open Bogotá

Final
- Champion: (Argentina) Paula Ormaechea
- Runner-up: (United States) Julia Cohen
- Score: 7–5, 6–1

Events
Singles	men	women
Doubles	men	women
← 2009 ·	Seguros Bolívar Open Bogotá	· 2011 →

Paula Ormaechea won the title, defeating Julia Cohen in the final, 7–5, 6–1.

== Seeds ==
1. (United States) Julia Cohen (final)
2. (Bolivia) María Fernanda Álvarez Terán (semifinals)
3. (United States) Lauren Albanese (quarterfinals)
4. (Argentina) Mailen Auroux (semifinals)
5. (Argentina) Paula Ormaechea (champion)
6. (Brazil) Vivian Segnini (first round)
7. (United States) Lena Litvak (quarterfinals)
8. (Brazil) Nathalia Rossi (quarterfinals)

== Draw ==
=== Key ===
- Q = Qualifier
- WC = Wild card
- LL = Lucky loser
- Alt = Alternate
- SE = Special exempt
- PR = Protected ranking
- ITF = ITF entry
- JE = Junior exempt
- w/o = Walkover
- r = Retired
- d = Defaulted
- SR = Special ranking

=== Finals ===
Semifinals
1	(United States) Julia Cohen	6	6
4	(Argentina) Mailen Auroux	4	1
5	(Argentina) Paula Ormaechea	6	5	6
2	(Bolivia) María Fernanda Álvarez Terán	0	7	3

Final
1	(United States) Julia Cohen	5	1
5	(Argentina) Paula Ormaechea	7	6

=== Top half ===
First round
1	(United States) J Cohen	7	6
(Colombia) MP Ribero	5	1
Q	(Colombia) MA Tangarife	2	4
(Brazil) G Barbosa-Costa Silva	6	6
Q	(Chile) D Seguel	4	3
Q	(Brazil) L Rafful	6	6
Q	(Peru) M Demichelli Vergara	2	0
8	(Brazil) N Rossi	6	6
4	(Argentina) M Auroux	6	4	6
(Colombia) K Castiblanco	3	6	4
WC	(Colombia) A Moreno-Kaste	7	2	7
LL	(United States) A Riley	6^{3}	6	6^{2}
(Colombia) P Robles García	3	0^{r}
(Ecuador) ME Caseras	6	3
(Brazil) K Souza	2	2
7	(United States) L Litvak	6	6

Second round
1	(United States) J Cohen	7	6
(Brazil) G Barbosa-Costa Silva	5	3
(Brazil) L Rafful	2	1
(Brazil) N Rossi	6	6
4	(Argentina) M Auroux	6	6
WC	(Colombia) A Moreno-Kaste	3	4
(Ecuador) ME Caseras	6	1	6^{3}
7	(United States) L Litvak	3	6	7

Quarterfinals
1	(United States) J Cohen	6	6
8	(Brazil) N Rossi	0	0
4	(Argentina) M Auroux	6	6
7	(United States) L Litvak	2	1

Semifinals
1	(United States) J Cohen	6	6
4	(Argentina) M Auroux	4	1

=== Bottom half ===
First round
5	(Argentina) P Ormaechea	6	6
(United States) G Brodsky	2	1
(Mexico) K Hernandez	6^{2}	7	7
(Peru) I Várgas Calvo	7	6^{6}	6^{1}
Q	(Brazil) I Miró	3	4
(Paraguay) I Robbiana	6	6
WC	(Colombia) V Núñez Fuentes	2	3
3	(United States) L Albanese	6	6
6	(Brazil) V Segnini	6^{4}	3
(Bulgaria) A Naydenova	7	6
(Colombia) KJ Ramirez Rivera	6	1	1
(Venezuela) A Gámiz	4	6	6
Q	(Peru) C Razzeto	3	1
WC	(Colombia) L Ucros	6	6
WC	(Colombia) A Prisco	3	1
(Bolivia) MF Álvarez Terán	6	6

Second round
5	(Argentina) P Ormaechea	6	6
(Mexico) K Hernandez	2	2
(Paraguay) I Robbiana	0	1
3	(United States) L Albanese	6	6
(Bulgaria) A Naydenova	6^{5}	2
(Venezuela) A Gámiz	7	6
WC	(Colombia) L Ucros	4	0
(Bolivia) MF Álvarez Terán	6	6

Quarterfinals
5	(Argentina) P Ormaechea	3	6	6
3	(United States) L Albanese	6	1	3
(Venezuela) A Gámiz	4	2
2	(Bolivia) MF Álvarez Terán	6	6

Semifinals
5	(Argentina) P Ormaechea	6	5	6
2	(Bolivia) MF Álvarez Terán	0	7	3
