= 2009 Open Barletta – Città della Disfida – Singles =

Città della Disfida – Singles
- 2009 Open Barletta – Città della Disfida

Final
- Champion: (Czech Republic) Ivo Minář
- Runner-up: (Spain) Santiago Ventura
- Score: 6–4, 6–3

Events
Singles	Doubles
← 2008 ·	Open Barletta – Città della Disfida	· 2010 →

Mikhail Kukushkin was the defending champion; however, he didn't take part in these championships this year.
Ivo Minář defeated Santiago Ventura in the final (6–4, 6–3).

== Seeds ==
1. (Spain) Daniel Gimeno-Traver (first round)
2. (Czech Republic) Ivo Minář (champion)
3. (Uzbekistan) Denis Istomin (semifinals)
4. (Brazil) Marcos Daniel (first round)
5. (Spain) Rubén Ramírez Hidalgo (quarterfinals)
6. (Spain) Santiago Ventura (final)
7. (Uruguay) Pablo Cuevas (first round)
8. (Peru) Luis Horna (quarterfinals)

== Draw ==
=== Key ===
- Q = Qualifier
- WC = Wild card
- LL = Lucky loser
- Alt = Alternate
- SE = Special exempt
- PR = Protected ranking
- ITF = ITF entry
- JE = Junior exempt
- w/o = Walkover
- r = Retired
- d = Defaulted
- SR = Special ranking

=== Final four ===
Semifinals
SE	(Spain) David Marrero	6	2	1
6	(Spain) Santiago Ventura	3	6	6
3	(Uzbekistan) Denis Istomin	4	7	2
2	(Czech Republic) Ivo Minář	6	6^{3}	6

Final
6	(Spain) Santiago Ventura	4	3
2	(Czech Republic) Ivo Minář	6	6

=== Top half ===
First round
1	(Spain) D Gimeno-Traver	5	1
(Spain) P Riba	7	6
(Argentina) JP Brzezicki	4	6	4
SE	(Spain) D Marrero	6	3	6
(Slovakia) D Hrbatý	7	2	3
WC	(Italy) T Fabbiano	5	6	6
(Serbia) B Pašanski	2	6^{0}
8	(Peru) L Horna	6	7
4	(Brazil) M Daniel	6	3	4
WC	(Italy) A di Mauro	1	6	6
WC	(Italy) G Naso	7	3	3
(Algeria) L Ouahab	6^{4}	6	6
(France) A Sidorenko	3	3
Q	(Netherlands) N van der Meer	6	6
(Italy) T Tenconi	7	3	2
6	(Spain) S Ventura	6^{2}	6	6

Second round
(Spain) P Riba	3	3
SE	(Spain) D Marrero	6	6
WC	(Italy) T Fabbiano	2	6	0
8	(Peru) L Horna	6	4	6
WC	(Italy) A di Mauro	6	7
(Algeria) L Ouahab	3	5
Q	(Netherlands) N van der Meer	2	1
6	(Spain) S Ventura	6	6

Quarterfinals
SE	(Spain) D Marrero	6	6
8	(Peru) L Horna	2	4
WC	(Italy) A di Mauro	6	3	0^{r}
6	(Spain) S Ventura	2	6	4

Semifinals
SE	(Spain) D Marrero	6	2	1
6	(Spain) S Ventura	3	6	6

=== Bottom half ===
First round
5	(Spain) R Ramírez Hidalgo	6	7
Q	(Italy) A Brizzi	4	5
WC	(Italy) D Bracciali	4	4
(Belgium) R Bemelmans	6	6
(Belgium) X Malisse	3	6	6
(Peru) I Miranda	6	4	4
Q	(France) J Eysseric	6	2	6^{6}
3	(Uzbekistan) D Istomin	3	6	7
7	(Uruguay) P Cuevas	6	5	6^{5}
(Kazakhstan) Y Schukin	3	7	7
Q	(Netherlands) M Middelkoop	1
(Denmark) K Pless	0	r
(Spain) D Muñoz-De La Nava	5
(Netherlands) J Huta Galung	2	r
SE	(Netherlands) T de Bakker	4	3
2	(Czech Republic) I Minář	6	6

Second round
5	(Spain) R Ramírez Hidalgo	6	6
(Belgium) R Bemelmans	2	1
(Belgium) X Malisse	2	7	6^{2}
3	(Uzbekistan) D Istomin	6	6^{9}	7
(Kazakhstan) Y Schukin	5	6	7
Q	(Netherlands) M Middelkoop	7	3	5
(Spain) D Muñoz-De La Nava	3	4
2	(Czech Republic) I Minář	6	6

Quarterfinals
5	(Spain) R Ramírez Hidalgo	4	1
3	(Uzbekistan) D Istomin	6	6
(Kazakhstan) Y Schukin	1	2
2	(Czech Republic) I Minář	6	6

Semifinals
3	(Uzbekistan) D Istomin	4	7	2
2	(Czech Republic) I Minář	6	6^{3}	6
