= 2010 Seguros Bolívar Open Bogotá =

2010 sporting event

- Date: July 12 – July 18
- Edition: 6th
- Location: Bogotá, Colombia

Champions

Men's singles
- (Colombia) Robert Farah

Women's singles
- (Argentina) Paula Ormaechea

Men's doubles
- (Colombia) Juan Sebastián Cabal / (Colombia) Robert Farah

Women's doubles
- (Venezuela) Andrea Gámiz / (Argentina) Paula Ormaechea
← 2009 ·	Seguros Bolívar Open Bogotá	· 2011 →

The 2010 Seguros Bolívar Open Bogotá was a professional tennis tournament played on outdoor red clay courts. This was the sixth edition of the tournament which was part of the 2010 ATP Challenger Tour and the 2010 ITF Women's Circuit. It took place in Bogotá, Colombia between 12 July and 18 July 2010.

== ATP entrants ==
=== Seeds ===
Nationality	Player	Ranking*	Seeding
COL	Santiago Giraldo	56	1
COL	Alejandro Falla	64	2
BRA	Marcos Daniel	100	3
CHI	Nicolás Massú	101	4
BRA	João Souza	129	5
GER	Andre Begemann	166	6
COL	Carlos Salamanca	167	7
MEX	Santiago González	169	8

- Rankings are as of July 5, 2010.

=== Other entrants ===
The following players received wildcards into the singles main draw:

- (Colombia) Robert Farah
- (Italy) Roberto Livi
- (Chile) Nicolás Massú
- (Colombia) Eduardo Struvay

The following players received entry from the qualifying draw:

- (Ecuador) Júlio César Campozano
- (Argentina) Guillermo Durán
- (Ecuador) Iván Endara
- (United States) Ty Trombetta

== Champions ==
=== Men's singles ===
(Colombia) Robert Farah def. (Colombia) Carlos Salamanca, 6–3, 2–6, 7–6(3)

=== Women's singles ===
(Argentina) Paula Ormaechea def. (United States) Julia Cohen, 7–5, 6–1

=== Men's doubles ===
(Colombia) Juan Sebastián Cabal / (Colombia) Robert Farah def. (Dominican Republic) Víctor Estrella / (Colombia) Alejandro González 7–6(6), 6–4

=== Women's doubles ===
(Venezuela) Andrea Gámiz / (Argentina) Paula Ormaechea def. (Argentina) Mailen Auroux / (Colombia) Karen Emilia Castiblanco Duarte, 5–7, 6–4, [10–8]
