= 2008 Brasil Open – Doubles =

Doubles
- 2008 Brasil Open

Final
- Champions: (Brazil) Marcelo Melo (Brazil) André Sá
- Runners-up: (Spain) Albert Montañés (Spain) Santiago Ventura
- Score: 4–6, 6–2, [10–7]

Details
- Draw: 16
- Seeds: 4

Events
Singles	Doubles
- Brasil Open

Lukáš Dlouhý and Pavel Vízner were the defending champions, but chose not to participate that year.

Marcelo Melo and André Sá won in the final 4–6, 6–2, [10–7], against Albert Montañés and Santiago Ventura.

== Seeds ==
1. (Brazil) Marcelo Melo / (Brazil) André Sá (champions)
2. (Czech Republic) František Čermák / (Czech Republic) Leoš Friedl (quarterfinals)
3. (Argentina) Martín García / (Austria) Oliver Marach (first round)
4. (Spain) Marcel Granollers-Pujol / (Spain) Rubén Ramírez Hidalgo (quarterfinals)

== Draw ==
Key

- Q = Qualifier
- WC = Wild card
- LL = Lucky loser
- Alt = Alternate
- ITF = ITF entry
- PR = Protected ranking
- SR = Special ranking
- SE = Special exempt
- JE = Junior exempt
- JR = Junior Accelerator Programme entrant
- CO = College Accelerator Programme entrant
- NG = Next Gen Accelerator Program entrant
- w/o = Walkover
- r = Retired
- d = Defaulted

=== Draw ===
First round
1	(Brazil) M Melo (Brazil) A Sá	6	7^{10}
(Italy) L Azzaro (Italy) P Starace	3	6^{8}
ALT	(France) N Devilder (France) O Patience	4	1
(Argentina) L Arnold Ker (Argentina) S Prieto	6	6
3	(Argentina) M García (Austria) O Marach	4	2
WC	(Brazil) T Bellucci (Brazil) M Daniel	6	6
(Spain) N Almagro (Argentina) M Vassallo Argüello	6	6
(Spain) Ó Hernández (Argentina) S Roitman	3	4
(Italy) F Fognini (Italy) F Volandri	6	6
WC	(Brazil) A Baran (Brazil) G Kuerten	3	3
(Australia) P Luczak (Serbia) B Pašanski	3	2
4	(Spain) M Granollers-Pujol (Spain) R Ramírez Hidalgo	6	6
(Spain) Montañés (Spain) S Ventura	2	7^{7}	[10]
(Argentina) C Berlocq (Argentina) G Coria	6	6^{4}	[7]
(Argentina) JP Brzezicki (Argentina) H Zeballos	6	3	[8]
2	(Czech Republic) F Čermák (Czech Republic) L Friedl	3	6	[10]

Quarterfinals
1	(Brazil) M Melo (Brazil) A Sá	6	7^{7}
(Argentina) L Arnold Ker (Argentina) S Prieto	1	6^{5}
WC	(Brazil) T Bellucci (Brazil) M Daniel	6	6
(Spain) N Almagro (Argentina) M Vassallo Argeello	2	3
(Italy) F Fognini (Italy) F Volandri	6	2	[10]
4	(Spain) M Granollers-Pujol (Spain) R Ramírez Hidalgo	4	6	[7]
(Spain) Montañés (Spain) S Ventura	6	2	[10]
2	(Czech Republic) F Čermák (Czech Republic) L Friedl	2	6	[8]

Semifinals
1	(Brazil) M Melo (Brazil) A Sá	6	6
WC	(Brazil) T Bellucci (Brazil) M Daniel	4	2
(Italy) F Fognini (Italy) F Volandri	0	2
(Spain) Montañés (Spain) S Ventura	6	6

Final
1	(Brazil) M Melo (Brazil) A Sá	4	6	[10]
(Spain) Montañés (Spain) S Ventura	6	2	[7]
