= 2010 Zagreb Open – Singles =

Singles
- 2010 Zagreb Open

Final
- Champion: (Kazakhstan) Yuri Schukin
- Runner-up: (Spain) Santiago Ventura
- Score: 6–3, 7–5

Events
Singles	Doubles
← 2009 ·	Zagreb Open	· 2011 →

Marcos Daniel was the defending champion, but he lost against Yuri Schukin in the semifinals.
Schukin won in the final 6–3, 7–5, against Santiago Ventura.

== Seeds ==
1. (Brazil) Marcos Daniel (semifinals)
2. (Chile) Nicolás Massú (quarterfinals)
3. (Slovenia) Blaž Kavčič (quarterfinals)
4. (Austria) Daniel Köllerer (first round, retired)
5. (India) Somdev Devvarman (first round)
6. (Spain) Rubén Ramírez Hidalgo (quarterfinals)
7. (Spain) Santiago Ventura (final)
8. (Slovenia) Grega Žemlja (second round)

== Draw ==
=== Key ===
- Q = Qualifier
- WC = Wild card
- LL = Lucky loser
- Alt = Alternate
- SE = Special exempt
- PR = Protected ranking
- ITF = ITF entry
- JE = Junior exempt
- w/o = Walkover
- r = Retired
- d = Defaulted
- SR = Special ranking

=== Finals ===
Semifinals
1	(Brazil) Marcos Daniel	1	3
(Kazakhstan) Yuri Schukin	6	6
(Argentina) Federico del Bonis	4	1
7	(Spain) Santiago Ventura	6	6

Final
(Kazakhstan) Yuri Schukin	6	7
7	(Spain) Santiago Ventura	3	5

=== Top half ===
First round
1	(Brazil) M Daniel	7	3	6
WC	(Croatia) N Mektić	6^{5}	6	4
Q	(Croatia) A Sančić	6^{4}	6^{8}
(Canada) P Polansky	7	7
(Czech Republic) L Rosol	6	6
Q	(Hungary) A Balázs	3	2
(India) P Amritraj	3	1
6	(Spain) R Ramírez Hidalgo	6	6
3	(Slovenia) B Kavčič	6	6
ALT	(Germany) A Begemann	2	1
(Australia) M Ebden	1	7	6
SE	(Czech Republic) I Minář	6	6^{3}	4
(Brazil) R Hocevar	3	6	0
Q	(Russia) A Kuznetsov	6	4	6
(Kazakhstan) Y Schukin	7	1	6
5	(India) S Devvarman	6^{3}	6	1

Second round
1	(Brazil) M Daniel	6	6
(Canada) P Polansky	1	4
(Czech Republic) L Rosol	6^{4}	7	3
6	(Spain) R Ramírez Hidalgo	7	6^{2}	6
3	(Slovenia) B Kavčič	6	6
(Australia) M Ebden	3	2
Q	(Russia) A Kuznetsov	4	1
(Kazakhstan) Y Schukin	6	6

Quarterfinals
1	(Brazil) M Daniel	3	6	7
6	(Spain) R Ramírez Hidalgo	6	3	5
3	(Slovenia) B Kavčič	7	3	5
(Kazakhstan) Y Schukin	6^{3}	6	7

Semifinals
1	(Brazil) M Daniel	1	3
(Kazakhstan) Y Schukin	6	6

=== Bottom half ===
First round
8	(Slovenia) G Žemlja	6	6
(France) J Dasnières de Veigy	2	1
WC	(Argentina) G Gaudio	6	0	6
Q	(Russia) I Belyaev	4	6	4
(United States) M Yani	6	6
WC	(Australia) B Tomic	3	4
(Argentina) F del Bonis	4
4	(Austria) D Köllerer	1	r
7	(Spain) S Ventura	6	6
(Croatia) R Karanušić	4	3
(Argentina) S Decoud	6^{4}	2
(Croatia) I Dodig	7	6
(Austria) A Haider-Maurer	6	0	6
(Australia) N Lindahl	1	6	2
WC	(Croatia) A Veić	4	2
2	(Chile) N Massú	6	6

Second round
8	(Slovenia) G Žemlja	7	2	6^{1}
WC	(Argentina) G Gaudio	6^{4}	6	7
(United States) M Yani	3	3
(Argentina) F del Bonis	6	6
7	(Spain) S Ventura	7	6
(Croatia) I Dodig	6^{3}	3
(Austria) A Haider-Maurer	5	4
2	(Chile) N Massú	7	6

Quarterfinals
WC	(Argentina) G Gaudio	2	3
(Argentina) F del Bonis	6	6
7	(Spain) S Ventura	3	6	6
2	(Chile) N Massú	6	4	3

Semifinals
(Argentina) F del Bonis	4	1
7	(Spain) S Ventura	6	6
