= 2009 Zagreb Open =

- Date: May 11–17, 2009
- Edition: 14th
- Location: Zagreb, Croatia

Champions

Singles
- (Brazil) Marcos Daniel

Doubles
- (Australia) Peter Luczak / (Italy) Alessandro Motti
← 2008 ·	Zagreb Open	· 2010 →

The 2009 Zagreb Open was a professional tennis tournament played on outdoor red clay courts. It was part of the 2009 ATP Challenger Tour. It took place in Zagreb, Croatia between May 11 and May 17, 2009.

== Singles entrants ==
=== Seeds ===
Nationality	Player	Ranking*	Seeding
FRA	Nicolas Devilder	60	1
USA	Robert Kendrick	82	2
ARG	Leonardo Mayer	104	3
ARG	Brian Dabul	108	4
CRO	Roko Karanušić	111	5
BRA	Thiago Alves	119	6
BRA	Marcos Daniel	120	7
CZE	Jiří Vaněk	126	8

- Rankings are as of May 4, 2009.

=== Other entrants ===
The following players received wildcards into the singles main draw:

- (Croatia) Ivan Dodig
- (Croatia) Nikola Mektić
- (Croatia) Antonio Sančić
- (Croatia) Antonio Veić

The following players received entry from the qualifying draw:

- (Italy) Andrea Arnaboldi
- (Russia) Evgeny Donskoy
- (Austria) Martin Fischer
- (Croatia) Franko Škugor

== Champions ==
=== Singles ===
(Brazil) Marcos Daniel def. (Belgium) Olivier Rochus, 6–3, 6–4

=== Doubles ===
(Australia) Peter Luczak / (Italy) Alessandro Motti def. (United States) Brendan Evans / (United States) Ryan Sweeting, 6–4, 6–4
