= 2010 Seguros Bolívar Open Bogotá – Men's doubles =

Men's doubles
- 2010 Seguros Bolívar Open Bogotá

Final
- Champions: (Colombia) Juan Sebastián Cabal (Colombia) Robert Farah
- Runners-up: (Dominican Republic) Víctor Estrella (Colombia) Alejandro González
- Score: 7–6(6), 6–4

Events
Singles	men	women
Doubles	men	women
← 2009 ·	Seguros Bolívar Open Bogotá	· 2011 →

Sebastián Prieto and Horacio Zeballos were the defending champions but chose not to compete.
Juan Sebastián Cabal and Robert Farah won the final against Víctor Estrella and Alejandro González 7–6(6), 6–4.

== Seeds ==
1. (Germany) Andre Begemann / (Portugal) Leonardo Tavares (semifinals, withdrew)
2. (Brazil) Marcos Daniel / (Mexico) Santiago González (first round, withdrew)
3. (Australia) Adam Hubble / (Brazil) Márcio Torres (first round)
4. (Brazil) Ricardo Hocevar / (Brazil) João Souza (quarterfinals)

== Draw ==
=== Key ===
- Q = Qualifier
- WC = Wild card
- LL = Lucky loser
- Alt = Alternate
- SE = Special exempt
- PR = Protected ranking
- ITF = ITF entry
- JE = Junior exempt
- w/o = Walkover
- r = Retired
- d = Defaulted
- SR = Special ranking

=== Draw ===
First round
1	(Germany) A Begemann (Portugal) L Tavares	6	6
ALT	(Ecuador) I Endara (Italy) M Viola	1	2
(Argentina) D Álvarez (Chile) A García
(Ecuador) JC Campozano (Ecuador) G Lapentti	w/o
4	(Brazil) R Hocevar (Brazil) J Souza	6	7
(Argentina) S Decoud (Colombia) C Salamanca	4	6^{4}
WC	(Colombia) JS Cabal (Colombia) R Farah	4	6	[11]
(Argentina) D Cristín (Argentina) A Molteni	6	4	[9]
WC	(Colombia) F Mantilla (Colombia) M Quintero	4	3	r
(Argentina) F Bagnis (Argentina) J-M Valverde	6	2
(Dominican Republic) V Estrella (Colombia) A González	6	6
3	(Australia) A Hubble (Brazil) M Torres	2	3
(Brazil) R Dutra da Silva (Spain) C Poch-Gradin	5	3
WC	(Colombia) JS Gómez (Colombia) E Struvay	7	6
(Germany) G Kretschmer (Germany) A Satschko
2	(Brazil) M Daniel (Mexico) S González	w/o

Quarterfinals
1	(Germany) A Begemann (Portugal) L Tavares	6	6
(Argentina) D Álvarez (Chile) A García	2	4
4	(Brazil) R Hocevar (Brazil) J Souza	3	4
WC	(Colombia) JS Cabal (Colombia) R Farah	6	6
(Argentina) F Bagnis (Argentina) J-M Valverde	3	1
(Dominican Republic) V Estrella (Colombia) A González	6	6
WC	(Colombia) JS Gómez (Colombia) E Struvay	6	6
(Germany) G Kretschmer (Germany) A Satschko	2	1

Semifinals
1	(Germany) A Begemann (Portugal) L Tavares	w/o
WC	(Colombia) JS Cabal (Colombia) R Farah
(Dominican Republic) V Estrella (Colombia) A González	6	7
WC	(Colombia) JS Gómez (Colombia) E Struvay	4	6^{4}

Finals
WC	(Colombia) JS Cabal (Colombia) R Farah	7	6
(Dominican Republic) V Estrella (Colombia) A González	6^{6}	4
