= 2009 Zagreb Open – Singles =

Singles
- 2009 Zagreb Open

Final
- Champion: (Brazil) Marcos Daniel
- Runner-up: (Belgium) Olivier Rochus
- Score: 6–3, 6–4

Events
Singles	Doubles
← 2008 ·	Zagreb Open	· 2010 →

Christophe Rochus was the winner in 2008, but he didn't play this year.
Marcos Daniel became the new champion. He defeated Olivier Rochus in the final of tournament.

== Seeds ==
1. (France) Nicolas Devilder (semifinals)
2. (United States) Robert Kendrick (second round)
3. (Argentina) Leonardo Mayer (first round)
4. (Argentina) Brian Dabul (quarterfinals)
5. (Croatia) Roko Karanušić (quarterfinals)
6. (Brazil) Thiago Alves (first round)
7. (Brazil) Marcos Daniel (champion)
8. (Czech Republic) Jiří Vaněk (first round)

== Draw ==
=== Key ===
- Q = Qualifier
- WC = Wild card
- LL = Lucky loser
- Alt = Alternate
- SE = Special exempt
- PR = Protected ranking
- ITF = ITF entry
- JE = Junior exempt
- w/o = Walkover
- r = Retired
- d = Defaulted
- SR = Special ranking

=== Finals ===
Semifinals
1	(France) Nicolas Devilder	7	4	2
7	(Brazil) Marcos Daniel	5	6	6
(Brazil) Ricardo Hocevar	1	2
(Belgium) Olivier Rochus	6	6

Final
7	(Brazil) Marcos Daniel	6	6
(Belgium) Olivier Rochus	3	4

=== Top half ===
First round
1	(France) N Devilder	7	6
(France) O Patience	6^{4}	2
(United States) B Evans	3	6^{7}
Q	(Italy) A Arnaboldi	6	7
WC	(Croatia) I Dodig	7	7
(United States) R Sweeting	5	6^{4}
(Serbia) I Bozoljac	6	6
8	(Czech Republic) J Vaněk	4	2
4	(Argentina) B Dabul	2	7	6
(Argentina) JP Brzezicki	6	5	4
WC	(Croatia) A Veić	7	3	6
(Australia) P Luczak	6^{5}	6	3
Q	(Croatia) F Škugor	6	7
(Spain) P Riba	4	6^{1}
WC	(Croatia) N Mektić	3	6^{4}
7	(Brazil) M Daniel	6	7

Second round
1	(France) N Devilder	6	6
Q	(Italy) A Arnaboldi	1	4
WC	(Croatia) I Dodig	2	2
(Serbia) I Bozoljac	6	6
4	(Argentina) B Dabul	7	6^{4}	2
WC	(Croatia) A Veić	5	7	2^{r}
Q	(Croatia) F Škugor	4	6	3
7	(Brazil) M Daniel	6	4	6

Quarterfinals
1	(France) N Devilder	6	7
(Serbia) I Bozoljac	1	6^{3}
4	(Argentina) B Dabul	1	5
7	(Brazil) M Daniel	6	7

Semifinals
1	(France) N Devilder	7	4	2
7	(Brazil) M Daniel	5	6	6

=== Bottom half ===
First round
6	(Brazil) T Alves	1	2
(Serbia) B Pašanski	6	6
Q	(Russia) E Donskoy	3	2
(Germany) D Brands	6	6
(Brazil) R Hocevar	1	6	6
Q	(Austria) M Fischer	6	3	2
(India) S Devvarman	4	6	6
3	(Argentina) L Mayer	6	2	2
5	(Croatia) R Karanušić	7	6
(Spain) D Muñoz-De La Nava	6^{5}	1
(United States) A Delic	7	6
(Slovakia) D Hrbatý	5	4
WC	(Croatia) A Sančić	6^{5}	2
(Belgium) O Rochus	7	6
(Netherlands) J Huta Galung	2	3
2	(United States) R Kendrick	6	6

Second round
(Serbia) B Pašanski	7	7
(Germany) D Brands	5	6^{3}
(Brazil) R Hocevar	6	7
(India) S Devvarman	4	6^{4}
5	(Croatia) R Karanušić	6	6
(United States) A Delic	3	3
(Belgium) O Rochus	6	7
2	(United States) R Kendrick	4	5

Quarterfinals
(Serbia) B Pašanski	3	6	6^{6}
(Brazil) R Hocevar	6	4	7
5	(Croatia) R Karanušić	3	6^{6}
(Belgium) O Rochus	6	7

Semifinals
(Brazil) R Hocevar	1	2
(Belgium) O Rochus	6	6
