= 2010 Zagreb Open – Doubles =

Doubles
- 2010 Zagreb Open

Final
- Champions: (Germany) Andre Begemann (Australia) Matthew Ebden
- Runners-up: (Spain) Rubén Ramírez Hidalgo (Spain) Santiago Ventura
- Score: 7–6(5), 5–7, [10–3]

Events
Singles	Doubles
← 2009 ·	Zagreb Open	· 2011 →

Peter Luczak and Alessandro Motti were the defending champions, but Luczak chose not to compete this year and Motti chose to compete in Biella instead.
Andre Begemann and Matthew Ebden won in the final 7–6(5), 5–7, [10–3] against Rubén Ramírez Hidalgo and Santiago Ventura.

== Seeds ==
1. (Spain) Rubén Ramírez Hidalgo / (Spain) Santiago Ventura (final)
2. (Mexico) Santiago González / (United States) Travis Rettenmaier (quarterfinals)
3. (Chile) Nicolás Massú / (Czech Republic) Lukáš Rosol (quarterfinals)
4. (Croatia) Ivan Dodig / (Croatia) Antonio Veić (semifinals)

== Draw ==
=== Key ===
- Q = Qualifier
- WC = Wild card
- LL = Lucky loser
- Alt = Alternate
- ITF = ITF entry
- PR = Protected ranking
- SR = Special ranking
- SE = Special exempt
- JE = Junior exempt
- JR = Junior Accelerator Programme entrant
- CO = College Accelerator Programme entrant
- NG = Next Gen Accelerator Program entrant
- w/o = Walkover
- r = Retired
- d = Defaulted

=== Draw ===
First round
1	(Spain) R Ramírez Hidalgo (Spain) S Ventura	6	6
(Canada) P Polansky (United States) M Yani	2	3
(India) P Amritraj (Croatia) R Karanušić	4	6	[8]
(Hungary) A Balázs (Serbia) D Savić	6	3	[10]
3	(Chile) N Massú (Czech Republic) L Rosol	7	7
(Croatia) M Hižak (Croatia) A Pavić	5	5
WC	(Croatia) I Cuić (Croatia) K Ritz	6^{3}	2
(India) S Devvarman (United States) R Harrison	7	6
WC	(Croatia) M Lovrinović (Croatia) A Lupieri
(Austria) A Haider-Maurer (Austria) D Köllerer	w/o
(Croatia) M Draganja (Croatia) L Zovko	6	4	[6]
4	(Croatia) I Dodig (Croatia) A Veić	3	6	[10]
(Germany) A Begemann (Australia) M Ebden	6	2	[10]
(Croatia) N Mektić (Croatia) I Zovko	1	6	[4]
WC	(Croatia) A Sančić (Croatia) J Topić	3	4
2	(Mexico) S González (United States) T Rettenmaier	6	6

Quarterfinals
1	(Spain) R Ramírez Hidalgo (Spain) S Ventura
(Hungary) A Balázs (Serbia) D Savić	w/o
3	(Chile) N Massú (Czech Republic) L Rosol	1	0
(India) S Devvarman (United States) R Harrison	6	6
WC	(Croatia) M Lovrinović (Croatia) A Lupieri	6	2	[1]
4	(Croatia) I Dodig (Croatia) A Veić	4	6	[10]
(Germany) A Begemann (Australia) M Ebden	6	5	[10]
2	(Mexico) S González (United States) T Rettenmaier	3	7	[6]

Semifinals
1	(Spain) R Ramírez Hidalgo (Spain) S Ventura	6	7
(India) S Devvarman (United States) R Harrison	3	5
4	(Croatia) I Dodig (Croatia) A Veić	7	6^{4}	[8]
(Germany) A Begemann (Australia) M Ebden	6^{0}	7	[10]

Finals
1	(Spain) R Ramírez Hidalgo (Spain) S Ventura	6^{5}	7	[3]
(Germany) A Begemann (Australia) M Ebden	7	5	[10]
