= 2010 Sony Ericsson Open – Men's singles =

Men's singles
- 2010 Sony Ericsson Open

Final
- Champion: (United States) Andy Roddick
- Runner-up: (Czech Republic) Tomáš Berdych
- Score: 7–5, 6–4

Details
- Draw: 96 (12Q / 4WC)
- Seeds: 32

Events
Singles	men	women
Doubles	men	women
← 2009 ·	Sony Ericsson Open	· 2011 →

Andy Roddick defeated Tomáš Berdych in the final, 7–5, 6–4 to win the men's singles tennis title at the 2010 Miami Open. It was his first Masters title since 2006, and his second career Miami Open title.

Andy Murray was the defending champion, but lost to Mardy Fish in the second round.

== Seeds ==
All seeds receive a bye into the second round.

1. (Switzerland) Roger Federer (fourth round)
2. (Serbia) Novak Djokovic (second round)
3. (United Kingdom) Andy Murray (second round)
4. (Spain) Rafael Nadal (semifinals)
5. (Sweden) Robin Söderling (semifinals)
6. (United States) Andy Roddick (champion)
7. (Croatia) Marin Čilić (fourth round)
8. (France) Jo-Wilfried Tsonga (quarterfinals)
9. (Chile) Fernando González (fourth round)
10. (Spain) Fernando Verdasco (quarterfinals)
11. (Croatia) Ivan Ljubičić (second round, retired due to back injury)
12. (Spain) Juan Carlos Ferrero (fourth round)
13. (Russia) Mikhail Youzhny (quarterfinals)
14. (France) ~~Gaël Monfils~~ (withdrew due to left wrist injury)
15. (Spain) David Ferrer (fourth round)
16. (Czech Republic) Tomáš Berdych (final)
17. (United States) John Isner (third round)
18. (Spain) Tommy Robredo (third round)
19. (Switzerland) Stanislas Wawrinka (third round)
20. (France) Gilles Simon (second round)
21. (United States) Sam Querrey (second round)
22. (Argentina) Juan Mónaco (third round)
23. (Austria) Jürgen Melzer (third round)
24. (Croatia) Ivo Karlović (third round)
25. (Cyprus) Marcos Baghdatis (third round)
26. (Spain) Albert Montañés (second round)
27. (Brazil) Thomaz Bellucci (fourth round)
28. (Germany) Philipp Kohlschreiber (third round)
29. (Spain) Feliciano López (third round)
30. (Serbia) Viktor Troicki (second round)
31. (Serbia) Janko Tipsarević (second round)
32. (France) Julien Benneteau (second round)
33. (Spain) Nicolás Almagro (quarterfinals)

== Draw ==
=== Key ===
- Q = Qualifier
- WC = Wild card
- LL = Lucky loser
- Alt = Alternate
- SE = Special exempt
- PR = Protected ranking
- ITF = ITF entry
- JE = Junior exempt
- w/o = Walkover
- r = Retired
- d = Defaulted
- SR = Special ranking

=== Finals ===
Quarterfinals
16	(Czech Republic) Tomáš Berdych	4	7^{7}	6
10	(Spain) Fernando Verdasco	6	6^{5}	4
13	(Russia) Mikhail Youzhny	1	4
5	(Sweden) Robin Söderling	6	6
8	(France) Jo-Wilfried Tsonga	3	2
4	(Spain) Rafael Nadal	6	6
6	(United States) Andy Roddick	6	6
33	(Spain) Nicolás Almagro	3	3

Semifinals
16	(Czech Republic) Tomáš Berdych	6	6
5	(Sweden) Robin Söderling	2	2
4	(Spain) Rafael Nadal	6	3	3
6	(United States) Andy Roddick	4	6	6

Final
16	(Czech Republic) Tomáš Berdych	5	4
6	(United States) Andy Roddick	7	6

=== Top half ===
==== Section 1 ====
First round
LL	(Ecuador) N Lapentti	7	6
(Italy) P Starace	5	3
Q	(Chile) N Massú	4	4
(France) F Serra	6	6
(Argentina) H Zeballos	7^{7}	6
(Italy) A Seppi	6^{4}	2
(United States) R Ram	4	5
(Netherlands) T de Bakker	6	7

Second round
1	(Switzerland) R Federer	6	6
LL	(Ecuador) N Lapentti	3	3
(France) F Serra	6	3	6
26	(Spain) A Montañés	3	6	2
20	(France) G Simon	2	3
(Argentina) H Zeballos	6	6
(Netherlands) T de Bakker	3	4
16	(Czech Republic) T Berdych	6	6

Third round
1	(Switzerland) R Federer	7^{7}	7^{7}
(France) F Serra	6^{2}	6^{3}
(Argentina) H Zeballos	4	5
16	(Czech Republic) T Berdych	6	7

Fourth round
1	(Switzerland) R Federer	4	7^{7}	6^{6}
16	(Czech Republic) T Berdych	6	6^{3}	7^{8}

==== Section 2 ====
First round
(Kazakhstan) E Korolev	3	3
(Israel) D Sela	6	6
(Romania) V Hănescu	6^{4}	6	4
(Colombia) A Falla	7^{7}	3	6
(Italy) P Lorenzi	4	6	6^{3}
(Argentina) JI Chela	6	3	7^{7}
(France) S Robert	7	6
(Germany) A Beck	5	4

Second round
10	(Spain) F Verdasco	6	6
(Israel) D Sela	1	2
(Colombia) A Falla	3	4
23	(Austria) J Melzer	6	6
25	(Cyprus) M Baghdatis	6	6
(Argentina) JI Chela	2	4
(France) S Robert	3	1
7	(Croatia) M Čilić	6	6

Third round
10	(Spain) F Verdasco	3	7^{7}	6
23	(Austria) J Melzer	6	6^{4}	1
25	(Cyprus) M Baghdatis	3	4
7	(Croatia) M Čilić	6	6

Fourth round
10	(Spain) F Verdasco	6	7^{7}
7	(Croatia) M Čilić	4	6^{3}

==== Section 3 ====
First round
(United States) M Fish	7^{7}	6
(Argentina) L Mayer	6^{4}	4
(Slovakia) L Lacko	5	6	3
(Germany) M Berrer	7	4	6
Q	(South Africa) K Anderson	6	6
Q	(Brazil) R Mello	3	1
Q	(Colombia) S Giraldo	6	6
LL	(Brazil) M Daniel	3	2

Second round
3	(United Kingdom) A Murray	4	4
(United States) M Fish	6	6
(Germany) M Berrer	6^{2}	5
29	(Spain) F López	7^{7}	7
19	(Switzerland) S Wawrinka	6	7
Q	(South Africa) K Anderson	4	5
Q	(Colombia) S Giraldo	0	1
13	(Russia) M Youzhny	6	6

Third round
(United States) M Fish	7	6
29	(Spain) F López	5	3
19	(Switzerland) S Wawrinka	6	6^{5}	5
13	(Russia) M Youzhny	1	7^{7}	7

Fourth round
(United States) M Fish	1	0^{r}
13	(Russia) M Youzhny	6	1

==== Section 4 ====
First round
(Italy) F Fognini	7^{7}	2	4
Q	(Chinese Taipei) Y-h Lu	6^{5}	6	6
Q	(Turkey) M İlhan	6	6
(Uruguay) P Cuevas	2	2
(Germany) P Petzschner	6	6
Q	(United States) R Sweeting	3	1
(Australia) P Luczak	6	7^{7}
(Spain) Ó Hernández	3	6^{4}

Second round
9	(Chile) F González	6	6
Q	(Chinese Taipei) Y-h Lu	4	4
Q	(Turkey) M İlhan	2	5
22	(Argentina) J Mónaco	6	7
31	(Serbia) J Tipsarević	4	0
(Germany) P Petzschner	6	6
(Australia) P Luczak	6^{5}	0
5	(Sweden) R Söderling	7^{7}	6

Third round
9	(Chile) F González	6^{4}	6	6
22	(Argentina) J Mónaco	7^{7}	4	2
(Germany) P Petzschner	1	2
5	(Sweden) R Söderling	6	6

Fourth round
9	(Chile) F González	0	7^{7}	2
5	(Sweden) R Söderling	6	6^{3}	6

=== Bottom half ===
==== Section 5 ====
First round
(France) A Clément	6^{4}	2
(Spain) G García López	7^{7}	6
(Switzerland) M Chiudinelli	6^{2}	6	2
(Germany) F Mayer	7^{7}	1	6
Q	(Uzbekistan) D Istomin	6^{5}	4
(United States) M Russell	7^{7}	6
(Austria) D Köllerer	4	6	6
(Belgium) C Rochus	6	3	2

Second round
8	(France) J-W Tsonga	6	6
(Spain) G García López	4	3
(Germany) F Mayer	6^{r}
28	(Germany) P Kohlschreiber	6
17	(United States) J Isner	7^{7}	2	7^{7}
(United States) M Russell	6^{5}	6	6^{5}
(Austria) D Köllerer	0^{r}
12	(Spain) JC Ferrero	4

Third round
8	(France) J-W Tsonga	6	7
28	(Germany) P Kohlschreiber	2	5
17	(United States) J Isner	2	6	3
12	(Spain) JC Ferrero	6	3	6

Fourth round
8	(France) J-W Tsonga	6	6
12	(Spain) JC Ferrero	2	2

==== Section 6 ====
First round
(France) M Llodra	6	6
WC	(United States) R Harrison	2	2
Q	(Kazakhstan) A Golubev	3	4
(Spain) D Gimeno Traver	6	6
WC	(Argentina) D Nalbandian	6	6
(Poland) Ł Kubot	3	2
(United States) T Dent	6	6
Q	(Germany) R Schüttler	1	4

Second round
15	(Spain) D Ferrer	6	6
(France) M Llodra	2	4
(Spain) D Gimeno Traver	3	7^{7}	3
24	(Croatia) I Karlović	6	6^{5}	6
30	(Serbia) V Troicki	3	6	4
WC	(Argentina) D Nalbandian	6	4	6
(United States) T Dent	4	3
4	(Spain) R Nadal	6	6

Third round
15	(Spain) D Ferrer	7^{7}	6
24	(Croatia) I Karlović	6^{5}	3
WC	(Argentina) D Nalbandian	7^{10}	2	2
4	(Spain) R Nadal	6^{8}	6	6

Fourth round
15	(Spain) D Ferrer	6^{5}	4
4	(Spain) R Nadal	7^{7}	6

==== Section 7 ====
First round
(Russia) I Andreev	6	6
Q	(Belgium) X Malisse	4	4
(Czech Republic) J Hájek	3	7	5
(Ukraine) S Stakhovsky	6	5	7
(France) P-H Mathieu	3	6^{3}
Q	(Ukraine) I Marchenko	6	7^{7}
(Germany) S Greul	3	2
(Germany) B Becker	6	6

Second round
6	(United States) A Roddick	6	6
(Russia) I Andreev	4	4
(Ukraine) S Stakhovsky	6	7^{7}
32	(France) J Benneteau	3	6^{5}
18	(Spain) T Robredo	6	4	6
Q	(Ukraine) I Marchenko	3	6	4
(Germany) B Becker	4	0
11	(Croatia) I Ljubičić	6	1^{r}

Third round
6	(United States) A Roddick	6	6
(Ukraine) S Stakhovsky	2	1
18	(Spain) T Robredo	6	4	6^{1}
(Germany) B Becker	1	6	7^{7}

Fourth round
6	(United States) A Roddick	7^{7}	6
(Germany) B Becker	6^{4}	3

==== Section 8 ====
First round
(Argentina) E Schwank	4
(France) M Gicquel	3^{r}
WC	(Croatia) M Ančić	4	4
(France) J Chardy	6	6
WC	(Serbia) F Krajinović	7^{8}	4	4
(United States) J Blake	6^{6}	6	6
(Belgium) O Rochus	7^{7}	1	6
(France) R Gasquet	6^{2}	6	4

Second round
33	(Spain) N Almagro	6	7
(Argentina) E Schwank	4	5
(France) J Chardy	4	6	6
21	(United States) S Querrey	6	4	2
27	(Brazil) T Bellucci	3	6	6
(United States) J Blake	6	1	2
(Belgium) O Rochus	6	6^{7}	6
2	(Serbia) N Djokovic	2	7^{9}	4

Third round
33	(Spain) N Almagro	6	6^{9}	6
(France) J Chardy	2	7^{11}	3
27	(Brazil) T Bellucci	6	6
(Belgium) O Rochus	3	4

Fourth round
33	(Spain) N Almagro	6	3	7^{7}
27	(Brazil) T Bellucci	4	6	6^{3}

== Qualifying ==
=== Seeds ===
1. (Uzbekistan) Denis Istomin (qualified)
2. (Germany) Mischa Zverev (first round)
3. (Ukraine) Illya Marchenko (qualified)
4. (Brazil) Marcos Daniel (qualifying competition, lucky loser)
5. (Belgium) Xavier Malisse (qualified)
6. (Chile) Nicolás Massú (qualified)
7. (Germany) Rainer Schüttler (qualified)
8. (Ecuador) Nicolás Lapentti (qualifying competition, lucky loser)
9. (Colombia) Santiago Giraldo (qualified)
10. (Kazakhstan) Andrey Golubev (qualified)
11. (United States) Wayne Odesnik (first round)
12. (Chinese Taipei) Lu Yen-hsun (qualified)
13. (Portugal) Fred Gil (first round)
14. (United States) Robby Ginepri (first round)
15. (Brazil) Ricardo Mello (qualified)
16. (Germany) Björn Phau (first round)
17. (Canada) Jesse Levine (qualifying competition)
18. (France) Josselin Ouanna (first round)
19. (Portugal) Rui Machado (first round)
20. (India) Somdev Devvarman (qualifying competition)
21. (Turkey) Marsel İlhan (qualified)
22. (Jamaica) Dustin Brown (first round)
23. (United States) Kevin Kim (qualifying competition)
24. (South Africa) Kevin Anderson (qualified)

=== Qualifiers ===
1. (Uzbekistan) Denis Istomin
2. (South Africa) Kevin Anderson
3. (Ukraine) Illya Marchenko
4. (Turkey) Marsel İlhan
5. (Belgium) Xavier Malisse
6. (Chile) Nicolás Massú
7. (Germany) Rainer Schüttler
8. (Brazil) Ricardo Mello
9. (Colombia) Santiago Giraldo
10. (Kazakhstan) Andrey Golubev
11. (United States) Ryan Sweeting
12. (Chinese Taipei) Lu Yen-hsun

=== Lucky losers ===
1. (Brazil) Marcos Daniel
2. (Ecuador) Nicolás Lapentti

=== Key ===
- Q = Qualifier
- WC = Wild card
- LL = Lucky loser
- Alt = Alternate
- SE = Special exempt
- PR = Protected ranking
- ITF = ITF entry
- JE = Junior exempt
- w/o = Walkover
- r = Retired
- d = Defaulted
- SR = Special ranking

==== First qualifier ====
First round
1	(Uzbekistan) Denis Istomin	6	6
WC	(India) Yuki Bhambri	1	3
(Switzerland) Stéphane Bohli	7	6
16	(Germany) Björn Phau	5	3

Qualifying competition
1	(Uzbekistan) Denis Istomin	4	6	6
(Switzerland) Stéphane Bohli	6	3	3

==== Second qualifier ====
First round
2	(Germany) Mischa Zverev	6	1	2
(Austria) Stefan Koubek	2	6	6
(Argentina) Juan Pablo Brzezicki	0	6	1
24	(South Africa) Kevin Anderson	6	2	6

Qualifying competition
(Austria) Stefan Koubek	6^{5}	1
24	(South Africa) Kevin Anderson	7^{7}	6

==== Third qualifier ====
First round
3	(Ukraine) Illya Marchenko	6	6
(Brazil) João Souza	1	3
(France) David Guez	6^{3}	4
20	(India) Somdev Devvarman	7^{7}	6

Qualifying competition
3	(Ukraine) Illya Marchenko	6	6
20	(India) Somdev Devvarman	4	3

==== Fourth qualifier ====
First round
4	(Brazil) Marcos Daniel	7^{7}	6
WC	(United States) Jack Sock	6^{1}	0
Alt	(Argentina) Brian Dabul	6	4	3
21	(Turkey) Marsel İlhan	1	6	6

Qualifying competition
4	(Brazil) Marcos Daniel	6^{1}	2
21	(Turkey) Marsel İlhan	7^{7}	6

==== Fifth qualifier ====
First round
5	(Belgium) Xavier Malisse	7^{7}	6
(United States) Michael Yani	6^{2}	2
(United States) Donald Young	6	6
14	(United States) Robby Ginepri	2	3

Qualifying competition
5	(Belgium) Xavier Malisse	6	6
(United States) Donald Young	1	2

==== Sixth qualifier ====
First round
6	(Chile) Nicolás Massú	6^{4}	6	6
(Czech Republic) Lukáš Rosol	7^{7}	4	1
(Israel) Harel Levy	6	7^{9}
18	(France) Josselin Ouanna	3	6^{7}

Qualifying competition
6	(Chile) Nicolás Massú	6	7^{7}
(Israel) Harel Levy	4	6^{5}

==== Seventh qualifier ====
First round
7	(Germany) Rainer Schüttler	6	6
WC	(China) Wu Di	1	4
WC	(United States) Alexander Domijan	4	4
23	(United States) Kevin Kim	6	6

Qualifying competition
7	(Germany) Rainer Schüttler	7^{7}	3	7
23	(United States) Kevin Kim	6^{2}	6	5

==== Eighth qualifier ====
First round
8	(Ecuador) Nicolás Lapentti	6	6
(United States) Bobby Reynolds	1	4
(Chile) Paul Capdeville	6	4	1
15	(Brazil) Ricardo Mello	2	6	6

Qualifying competition
8	(Ecuador) Nicolás Lapentti	7	4	2
15	(Brazil) Ricardo Mello	5	6	6

==== Ninth qualifier ====
First round
9	(Colombia) Santiago Giraldo	6	6
(Argentina) Gastón Gaudio	1	2
(Paraguay) Ramón Delgado	6	6
13	(Portugal) Fred Gil	3	3

Qualifying competition
9	(Colombia) Santiago Giraldo	6	7^{7}
(Paraguay) Ramón Delgado	3	6^{1}

==== Tenth qualifier ====
First round
10	(Kazakhstan) Andrey Golubev	6	6
(United States) Robert Kendrick	4	4
(Croatia) Ivan Dodig	7^{7}	7
19	(Portugal) Rui Machado	6^{3}	5

Qualifying competition
10	(Kazakhstan) Andrey Golubev	7^{10}	6
(Croatia) Ivan Dodig	6^{8}	1

==== Eleventh qualifier ====
First round
11	(United States) Wayne Odesnik	6^{4}	6^{4}
(Brazil) Thiago Alves	7^{7}	7^{7}
(United States) Ryan Sweeting	6	6
22	(Jamaica) Dustin Brown	0	2

Qualifying competition
(Brazil) Thiago Alves	1	4
(United States) Ryan Sweeting	6	6

==== Twelfth qualifier ====
First round
12	(Chinese Taipei) Lu Yen-hsun	6	6
(Brazil) Júlio Silva	4	2
(France) Édouard Roger-Vasselin	2	6	6^{7}
17	(Canada) Jesse Levine	6	2	7^{9}

Qualifying competition
12	(Chinese Taipei) Lu Yen-hsun	6	6
17	(Canada) Jesse Levine	4	1
