= 2009 Seguros Bolívar Open Bogotá =

- Date: July 13 – July 19
- Edition: 5th
- Location: Bogotá, Colombia

Champions

Singles
- (Brazil) Marcos Daniel

Doubles
- (Argentina) Sebastián Prieto / (Argentina) Horacio Zeballos
← 2008 ·	Seguros Bolívar Open Bogotá	· 2010 →

The 2009 Seguros Bolívar Open Bogotá was a professional tennis tournament played on outdoor red clay courts. This was the fifth edition of the tournament which is part of the 2009 ATP Challenger Tour. It took place in Bogotá, Colombia between 13 and 19 July 2009.

== Singles entrants ==
=== Seeds ===
Nationality	Player	Ranking*	Seeding
CHI	Nicolás Massú	94	1
ARG	Brian Dabul	97	2
BRA	Marcos Daniel	101	3
COL	Santiago Giraldo	131	4
ARG	Horacio Zeballos	134	5
ARG	Sebastián Decoud	158	6
BRA	Ricardo Hocevar	160	7
ARG	Agustín Calleri	166	8

- Rankings are as of July 6, 2009.

=== Other entrants ===
The following players received wildcards into the singles main draw:

- (Colombia) Juan Sebastián Cabal
- (Venezuela) Ricardo Corrente
- (Colombia) Alejandro González
- (Colombia) Carlos Salamanca

The following players received entry from the qualifying draw:

- (Uruguay) Marcel Felder
- (Brazil) André Miele
- (Denmark) Kristian Pless
- (Colombia) Eduardo Struvay

== Champions ==
=== Singles ===
(Brazil) Marcos Daniel def. (Argentina) Horacio Zeballos, 4–6, 7–6(5), 6–4

=== Doubles ===
(Argentina) Sebastián Prieto / (Argentina) Horacio Zeballos def. (Brazil) Marcos Daniel / (Brazil) Ricardo Mello, 6–4, 7–5
