= Santiago Ventura Bertomeu =

Spanish tennis player (born 1980)

Santiago Ventura
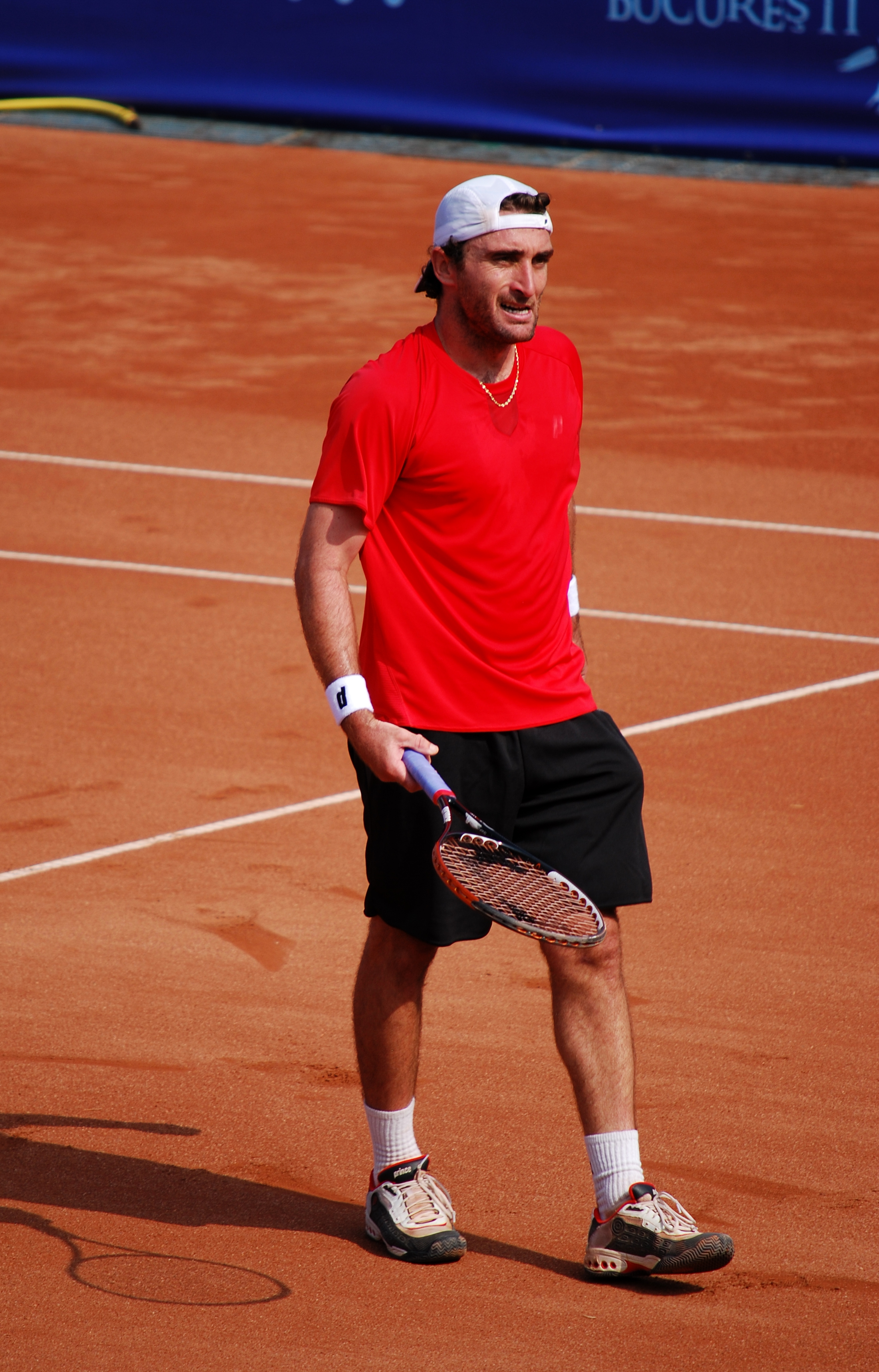
- Country (sports): Spain
- Residence: Burriana, Spain
- Born: 5 January 1980 (age 46) Castellón, Spain
- Height: 1.83 m (6 ft 0 in)
- Turned pro: 2001
- Retired: 2011
- Plays: Right-handed (two-handed backhand)
- Prize money: $1,240,224

Singles
- Career record: 38–59
- Career titles: 1
- Highest ranking: No. 65 (3 March 2008)

Grand Slam singles results
- Australian Open: 2R (2005)
- French Open: 1R (2005, 2008, 2009, 2010)
- Wimbledon: 1R (2005, 2008, 2010)
- US Open: 1R (2008)

Doubles
- Career record: 43–40
- Career titles: 5
- Highest ranking: No. 37 (7 July 2008)

Grand Slam doubles results
- Australian Open: 2R (2008)
- French Open: 3R (2010)
- Wimbledon: QF (2008)
- US Open: 2R (2010)
- Last updated on: 10 April 2021.

Santiago Ventura Bertomeu (Spanish pronunciation: [sanˈtjaɣo βenˈtuɾa βeɾtoˈmew]; (Note: In isolation, Ventura and Bertomeu are pronounced [benˈtuɾa] and [beɾtoˈmew] respectively.) born 5 January 1980) is a retired tennis player from Spain. He was born in Castellón, Spain and lives in Burriana, Spain. He is a clay court specialist and is known for the considerable use of drop shots during his matches.

Ventura reached a career-high singles ranking of world No. 65 on 3 March 2008. He reached a career-high doubles ranking of world No. 37 on 7 July 2008.

He was the first player to be beaten by Andy Murray on the ATP Tour, in the first round of the Aegon Championships tournament in 2005.

== Career finals ==
=== Singles (1 title) ===
Legend Grand Slam tournaments (0–0) ATP World Tour Finals (0–0) ATP World Tour Masters 1000 (0–0) ATP World Tour 500 Series (0–0) ATP World Tour 250 Series (1–0)	Finals by surface Hard (0–0) Clay (1–0) Grass (0–0)	Finals by setting Outdoor (1–0) Indoor (0–0)

Result	W–L	Date	Tournament	Tier	Surface	Opponent	Score
Win	1–0	May 2004	Casablanca, Morocco	International	Clay	(Slovakia) Dominik Hrbatý	6–3, 1–6, 6–4

=== Doubles (5 titles, 3 runner-ups) ===
Legend Grand Slam tournaments (0–0) ATP World Tour Finals (0–0) ATP World Tour Masters 1000 (0–0) ATP World Tour 500 Series (1–0) ATP World Tour 250 Series (4–3)	Finals by surface Hard (1–0) Clay (4–3) Grass (0–0)	Finals by setting Outdoor (5–3) Indoor (0–0)

Result	W–L	Date	Tournament	Tier	Surface	Partner	Opponents	Score
Win	1–0	Feb 2005	Viña del Mar, Chile	International	Clay	(Spain) David Ferrer	(Argentina) Gastón Etlis (Argentina) Martín Rodríguez	6–3, 6–4
Win	2–0	Feb 2005	Acapulco, Mexico	Intl. Gold	Clay	(Spain) David Ferrer	(Czech Republic) Jiří Vaněk (Czech Republic) Tomáš Zíb	4–6, 6–1, 6–4
Loss	2–1	Feb 2008	Costa do Sauípe, Brazil	International	Clay	(Spain) Albert Montañés	(Brazil) Marcelo Melo (Brazil) André Sá	6–4, 2–6, [7–10]
Win	3–1	May 2008	Casablanca, Morocco	International	Clay	(Spain) Albert Montañés	(United States) James Cerretani (Australia) Todd Perry	6–1, 6–2
Loss	3–2	Feb 2009	Buenos Aires, Argentina	International	Clay	(Spain) Nicolás Almagro	(Spain) Marcel Granollers (Spain) Alberto Martín	3–6, 7–5, [8–10]
Win	4–2	Jan 2010	Chennai, India	International	Hard	(Spain) Marcel Granollers	(Chinese Taipei) Lu Yen-hsun (Serbia) Janko Tipsarević	7–5, 6–2
Win	5–2	May 2010	Munich, Germany	International	Clay	(Austria) Oliver Marach	(United States) Eric Butorac (Germany) Michael Kohlmann	5–7, 6–3, [16–14]
Loss	5–3	Sep 2010	Bucharest, Romania	International	Clay	(Spain) Marcel Granollers	(Argentina) Juan Ignacio Chela (Poland) Łukasz Kubot	6–2, 5–7, [13–11]

== ATP Challenger and ITF Futures finals ==
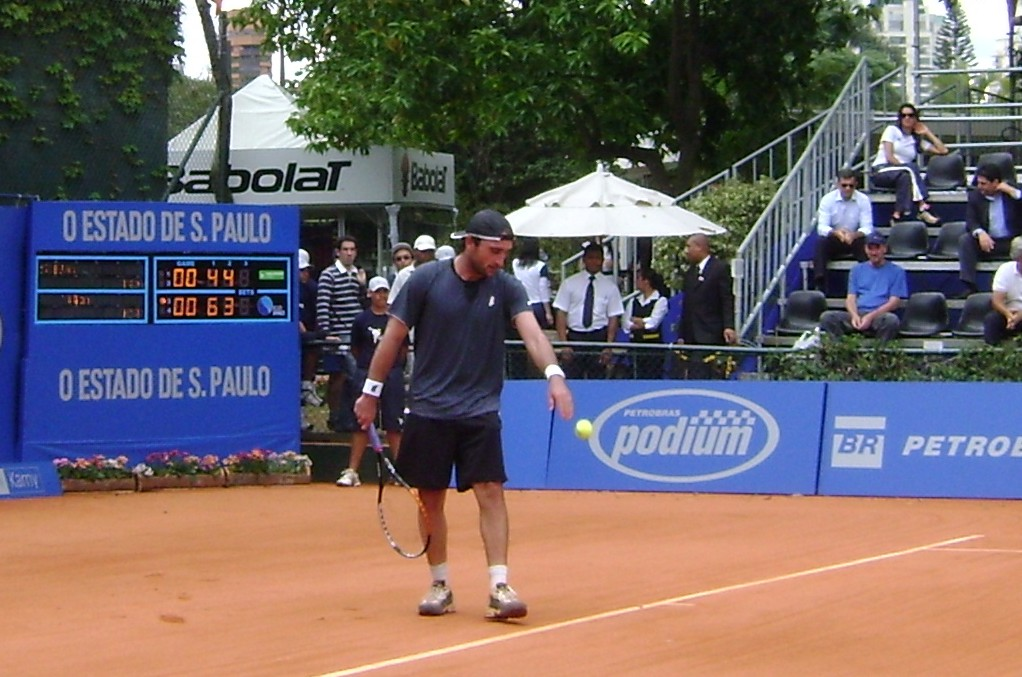
Ventura, at the 2009 São Paulo Challenger

=== Singles: 22 (13–9) ===
Legend ATP Challenger (4–8) ITF Futures (9–1)	Finals by surface Hard (2–0) Clay (11–9) Grass (0–0) Carpet (0–0)

Result	W–L	Date	Tournament	Tier	Surface	Opponent	Score
Win	1–0	Sep 2001	Spain F9, Oviedo	Futures	Clay	(Romania) Adrian Cruciat	6–2, 7–5
Win	2–0	Sep 2001	Spain F10, Madrid	Futures	Hard	(Australia) Luke Bourgeois	7–5, 7–6^{(7–4)}
Win	3–0	Jun 2002	Morocco F2, Marrakesh	Futures	Clay	(Luxembourg) Mike Scheidweiler	6–4, 6–4
Win	4–0	Jun 2002	Morocco F3, Agadir	Futures	Clay	(Egypt) Karim Maamoun	7–5, 7–6^{(7–5)}
Win	5–0	Jun 2003	Spain F11, Lanzarote	Futures	Hard	(Algeria) Lamine Ouahab	7–6^{(7–2)}, 2–6, 7–6^{(7–4)}
Win	6–0	Aug 2003	Spain F20, Santander	Futures	Clay	(Argentina) Diego Hipperdinger	6–3, 4–6, 7–5
Win	7–0	Dec 2003	Spain F29, Pontevedra	Futures	Clay	(Spain) Juan-Albert Viloca-Puig	6–2, 6–3
Win	8–0	Feb 2004	Spain F3, Murcia	Futures	Clay	(Austria) Marco Mirnegg	6–2, 6–2
Loss	8–1	Apr 2004	Italy F1, Frascati	Futures	Clay	(Italy) Daniele Giorgini	6–7^{(4–7)}, 4–6
Win	9–1	Sep 2004	Freudenstadt, Germany	Challenger	Clay	(Norway) Jan Frode Andersen	6–3, 1–6, 6–3
Loss	9–2	Oct 2004	Barcelona, Spain	Challenger	Clay	(Spain) Óscar Hernández	3–6, 6–3, 1–5 ret,
Win	10–2	Feb 2007	Spain F5, Murcia	Futures	Clay	(Spain) Javier Genaro-Martinez	6–2, 5–7, 6–3
Loss	10–3	May 2007	Gran Canaria, Spain	Challenger	Clay	(Australia) Peter Luczak	7–6^{(8–6)}, 3–6, 5–7
Win	11–3	Jun 2007	Milan, Italy	Challenger	Clay	(Romania) Victor Hănescu	6–3, 7–5
Loss	11–4	Aug 2007	Timișoara, Romania	Challenger	Clay	(Romania) Victor Hănescu	6–7^{(2–7)}, 3–6
Loss	11–5	Sep 2007	Cherkassy, Ukraine	Challenger	Clay	(Serbia) Boris Pashanski	5–7, 6–7^{(7–9)}
Win	12–5	Nov 2007	Montevideo, Uruguay	Challenger	Clay	(Spain) Marcel Granollers	4–6, 6–0, 6–4
Loss	12–6	Jun 2008	Sassuolo, Italy	Challenger	Clay	(Portugal) Fred Gil	2–6, 3–6
Win	13–6	Sep 2008	Bucharest, Romania	Challenger	Clay	(Romania) Victor Crivoi	5–7, 6–4, 6–2
Loss	13–7	Mar 2009	Rabat, Morocco	Challenger	Clay	(France) Laurent Recouderc	0–6, 2–6
Loss	13–8	Mar 2009	Barletta, Italy	Challenger	Clay	(Czech Republic) Ivo Minář	4–6, 3–6
Loss	13–9	May 2010	Zagreb, Croatia	Challenger	Clay	(Kazakhstan) Yuriy Schukin	3–6, 5–7

=== Doubles: 55 (38–17) ===
Legend ATP Challenger (23–10) ITF Futures (15–7)	Finals by surface Hard (8–0) Clay (30–17) Grass (0–0) Carpet (0–0)

Result	W–L	Date	Tournament	Tier	Surface	Partner	Opponents	Score
Loss	0–1	Aug 1998	Spain F4, Denia	Futures	Clay	(Spain) Jose-Ezequiel Lido-Mico	(Spain) Pedro Canovas-Garcia (Spain) Juan Giner	walkover
Win	1–1	Jul 2000	Spain F1, Alicante	Futures	Clay	(Spain) Javier Pérez-Vazquez	(Spain) Óscar Hernández (Spain) Marcos Roy-Girardi	7–6^{(7–5)}, 6–4
Loss	1–2	Sep 2000	Seville, Spain	Challenger	Clay	(Spain) Tommy Robredo	(Spain) Eduardo Nicolás-Espin (Spain) Germán Puentes-Alcaniz	3–6, 2–6
Win	2–2	Jan 2001	France F3, Feucherolles	Futures	Clay	(Spain) Marc López	(Federal Republic of Yugoslavia) Relja Dulić Fišer (Israel) Nir Welgreen	7–5, 7–6^{(7–4)}
Loss	2–3	May 2001	Austria F2, Telfs	Futures	Clay	(Spain) Marc Fornell Mestres	(Austria) Alexander Peya (Austria) Thomas Strengberger	6–4, 3–6, 0–6
Win	3–3	Sep 2001	Spain F8, Santander	Futures	Clay	(Spain) A-J Martin Arroyo	(Spain) Gabriel Trujillo Soler (Spain) C. Rexach-Itoiz	4–6, 6–3, 6–4
Loss	3–4	Sep 2001	Spain F9, Oviedo	Futures	Clay	(Spain) A-J Martin Arroyo	(Spain) Gabriel Trujillo Soler (Spain) C. Rexach-Itoiz	6–4, 6–1
Loss	3–5	Sep 2001	Seville, Spain	Challenger	Clay	(Spain) Marc López	(Italy) Stefano Galvani (Italy) Vincenzo Santopadre	4–6, 4–6
Win	4–5	Jan 2002	France F3, Feucherolles	Futures	Clay	(Spain) Rubén Ramírez Hidalgo	(Germany) Jan Weinzierl (Poland) Krzysztof Kwinta	walkover
Loss	4–6	Jul 2002	Spain F5, Alicante	Futures	Clay	(Spain) Ivan Esquerdo-Andreu	(Spain) Gabriel Trujillo Soler (Spain) Óscar Hernández	3–6, 3–6
Loss	4–7	Sep 2002	Brașov, Romania	Challenger	Clay	(Spain) Rubén Ramírez Hidalgo	(Germany) Christopher Kas (Austria) Herbert Wiltschnig	7–5, 4–6, 5–7
Win	5–7	Dec 2002	Spain F20, Gran Canaria	Futures	Clay	(Spain) Iván Navarro	(Spain) David Marrero (Spain) G. Rodriguez-Ruano	6–3, 1–2 ret.
Win	6–7	Feb 2003	Spain F1, Murcia	Futures	Hard	(Spain) Salvador Navarro Gutiérrez	(Spain) Artemon Apostu-Efremov (Belarus) Vitali Shvets	6–7^{(6–8)}, 6–2, 6–2
Win	7–7	Mar 2003	Portugal F5, Faro	Futures	Hard	(Spain) Guillermo García López	(Portugal) Helder Lopes (Portugal) Bernardo Mota	7–6^{(7–4)}, 6–7^{(6–8)}, 6–4
Win	8–7	Jul 2003	Spain F13, Alicante	Futures	Hard	(Spain) Guillermo García López	(Italy) Francesco Aldi (Italy) Alessandro da Col	6–2, 7–5
Win	9–7	Sep 2003	Spain F22, Madrid	Futures	Hard	(Spain) E. Carril-Caso	(Italy) Giuseppe Menga (Italy) Alessandro da Col	6–0, 3–6, 6–3
Win	10–7	Sep 2003	Spain F23, Madrid	Futures	Hard	(Spain) M-A Lopez-Jaén	(India) Mustafa Ghouse (Italy) Federico Torresi	7–5, 6–7^{(4–7)}, 6–2
Win	11–7	Sep 2003	Spain F24, Madrid	Futures	Hard	(Spain) E. Carril-Caso	(Brazil) Eduardo Bohrer (Brazil) Márcio Carlsson	6–4, 7–6^{(7–5)}
Win	12–7	Nov 2003	Spain F28, Gran Canaria	Futures	Clay	(Spain) Iván Navarro	(Finland) Lassi Ketola (Austria) Johannes Ager	6–3, 6–3
Loss	12–8	Dec 2003	Spain F29, Pontevedra	Futures	Clay	(Spain) Iván Navarro	(Spain) Eduardo Nicolás-Espin (Spain) Germán Puentes-Alcaniz	4–6, 4–6
Win	13–8	Feb 2004	Spain F3, Murcia	Futures	Clay	(Spain) Iván Navarro	(Spain) Gabriel Trujillo Soler (Spain) Salvador Navarro Gutiérrez	7–6^{(7–3)}, 6–1
Win	14–8	Feb 2004	Spain F4, Murcia	Futures	Clay	(Spain) Iván Navarro	(Spain) Marc Fornell Mestres (Spain) Salvador Navarro Gutiérrez	6–4, 6–1
Loss	14–9	May 2004	Great Britain F2, Edinburgh	Futures	Clay	(United Kingdom) Richard Brooks	(Australia) Andrew Derer (Australia) Joseph Sirianni	walkover
Loss	14–10	Sep 2004	Freudenstadt, Germany	Challenger	Clay	(Spain) Salvador Navarro Gutiérrez	(Romania) Gabriel Trifu (Germany) Alexander Waske	3–6, 7–6^{(7–5)}, 2–6
Win	15–10	Nov 2004	Bogotá, Colombia	Challenger	Clay	(Argentina) Sergio Roitman	(United Kingdom) Richard Barker (Germany) Frank Moser	7–5, 6–4
Loss	15–11	Dec 2004	Aracaju, Brazil	Challenger	Clay	(Argentina) Juan Pablo Guzmán	(Italy) Enzo Artoni (Argentina) Ignacio González King	4–6, 2–6
Win	16–11	Aug 2005	Geneva, Switzerland	Challenger	Clay	(Spain) Rubén Ramírez Hidalgo	(Switzerland) Stéphane Bohli (Switzerland) Roman Valent	6–3, 7–5
Loss	16–12	Nov 2005	Buenos Aires, Argentina	Challenger	Clay	(Spain) Rubén Ramírez Hidalgo	(Argentina) Lucas Arnold Ker (Argentina) Sebastián Prieto	0–6, 4–6
Win	17–12	Mar 2006	Barletta, Italy	Challenger	Clay	(Spain) Fernando Vicente	(Italy) Flavio Cipolla (Italy) Alessandro Motti	7–6^{(7–2)}, 4–6, [10–8]
Loss	17–13	Sep 2006	Tarragona, Spain	Challenger	Clay	(Spain) Álex López Morón	(United States) Hugo Armando (Spain) Gabriel Trujillo Soler	3–6, 6–7^{(3–7)}
Loss	17–14	Jan 2007	Spain F2, Calvià	Futures	Clay	(Spain) J-A Sanchez-de Luna	(Spain) David Marrero (Spain) M-A Lopez-Jaén	5–7, 7–6^{(7–5)}, 6–7^{(6–8)}
Win	18–14	Jan 2007	Spain F3, Mallorca	Futures	Hard	(Spain) Pedro Rico Garcia	(Spain) Pedro Clar (Spain) Pedro Villar-Almiron	6–3, 6–4
Win	19–14	Jul 2007	Córdoba, Argentina	Challenger	Hard	(Spain) Fernando Vicente	(Chile) Paul Capdeville (Argentina) Leonardo Mayer	6–4, 6–3
Win	20–14	Jul 2007	Poznań, Poland	Challenger	Clay	(Spain) Marc López	(Italy) Flavio Cipolla (Slovakia) Ivo Klec	6–2, 5–7, [10–3]
Win	21–14	Aug 2007	Timișoara, Romania	Challenger	Clay	(Spain) Marcel Granollers	(North Macedonia) Lazar Magdinchev (North Macedonia) Predrag Rusevski	6–1, 6–4
Win	22–14	Sep 2007	Cherkassy, Ukraine	Challenger	Clay	(Spain) Daniel Muñoz de la Nava	(Ukraine) Sergey Bubka (Russia) Alexander Kudryavstev	6–2, 7–6^{(7–4)}
Win	23–14	Sep 2007	Seville, Spain	Challenger	Clay	(Spain) Marcel Granollers	(Spain) J-A Sanchez de Luna (Spain) M. P. Puigdomenech	6–3, 6–2
Win	24–14	Sep 2007	Bucharest, Spain	Challenger	Clay	(Spain) Marcel Granollers	(Romania) Horia Tecău (Romania) Florin Mergea	6–2, 6–1
Win	25–14	Oct 2007	Tarragona, Spain	Challenger	Clay	(Spain) Marcel Granollers	(Spain) Pablo Andújar (Spain) Daniel Muñoz de la Nava	6–4, 7–6^{(7–3)}
Loss	25–15	Oct 2007	Bogotá, Colombia	Challenger	Clay	(Spain) Marcel Granollers	(Brazil) Thomaz Bellucci (Brazil) Bruno Soares	4–6, 6–4, [9–11]
Win	26–15	Oct 2007	Belo Horizonte, Brazil	Challenger	Clay	(Spain) Marcel Granollers	(Chile) Adrián García (Argentina) Leonardo Mayer	6–3, 6–3
Loss	26–16	Nov 2007	Montevideo, Uruguay	Challenger	Clay	(Spain) Marcel Granollers	(Uruguay) Pablo Cuevas (Peru) Luis Horna	walkover
Win	27–16	Sep 2008	Bucharest, Romania	Challenger	Clay	(Spain) Rubén Ramírez Hidalgo	(Italy) Andrea Arnaboldi (Argentina) Máximo González	6–3, 5–7, [10–6]
Win	28–16	Mar 2009	Rabat, Morocco	Challenger	Clay	(Spain) Rubén Ramírez Hidalgo	(Germany) Philipp Marx (Germany) Michael Kohlmann	6–4, 7–6^{(7–5)}
Win	29–16	Mar 2009	Marrakesh, Morocco	Challenger	Clay	(Spain) Rubén Ramírez Hidalgo	(Spain) Alberto Martín (Spain) Daniel Muñoz de la Nava	6–3, 7–6^{(7–5)}
Win	30–16	Mar 2009	Barletta, Italy	Challenger	Clay	(Spain) Rubén Ramírez Hidalgo	(Uruguay) Pablo Cuevas (Peru) Luis Horna	7–6^{(7–1)}, 6–2
Win	31–16	Jun 2009	Furth, Germany	Challenger	Clay	(Spain) Rubén Ramírez Hidalgo	(Germany) Simon Greul (Italy) Alessandro Motti	4–6, 6–1, [10–6]
Win	32–16	Jun 2009	Košice, Slovakia	Challenger	Clay	(Spain) Rubén Ramírez Hidalgo	(Slovakia) Dominik Hrbatý (Slovakia) Martin Kližan	6–2, 7–6^{(7–5)}
Win	33–16	Oct 2009	Asunción, Paraguay	Challenger	Clay	(Spain) Rubén Ramírez Hidalgo	(Argentina) Máximo González (Argentina) Eduardo Schwank	6–3, 7–6^{(7–3)}
Win	34–16	Jan 2010	Bucaramanga, Colombia	Challenger	Clay	(Spain) Pere Riba	(Brazil) Marcelo Demoliner (Brazil) Rodrigo Guidolin	6–2, 6–2
Win	35–16	Mar 2010	Caltanissetta, Italy	Challenger	Clay	(Spain) David Marrero	(Slovakia) Martin Kližan (Belarus) Uladzimir Ignatik	7–6^{(7–3)}, 6–4
Win	36–16	Mar 2010	Barletta, Italy	Challenger	Clay	(Spain) David Marrero	(Italy) Daniele Bracciale (Serbia) Ilija Bozoljak	6–3, 6–3
Loss	36–17	May 2010	Zagreb, Croatia	Challenger	Clay	(Spain) Rubén Ramírez Hidalgo	(Germany) Andre Begemann (Australia) Matthew Ebden	6–7^{(5–7)}, 7–5, [3–10]
Win	37–17	Aug 2010	San Sebastián, Spain	Challenger	Clay	(Spain) David Marrero	(United States) Brian Battistone (Sweden) Andreas Siljeström	6–4, 7–6^{(7–3)}
Win	38–17	Sep 2010	Seville, Spain	Challenger	Clay	(Spain) Daniel Muñoz de la Nava	(Serbia) Nikola Ćirić (Spain) Guillermo Olaso	6–2, 7–5
