= Marcos Daniel =

Brazilian tennis player

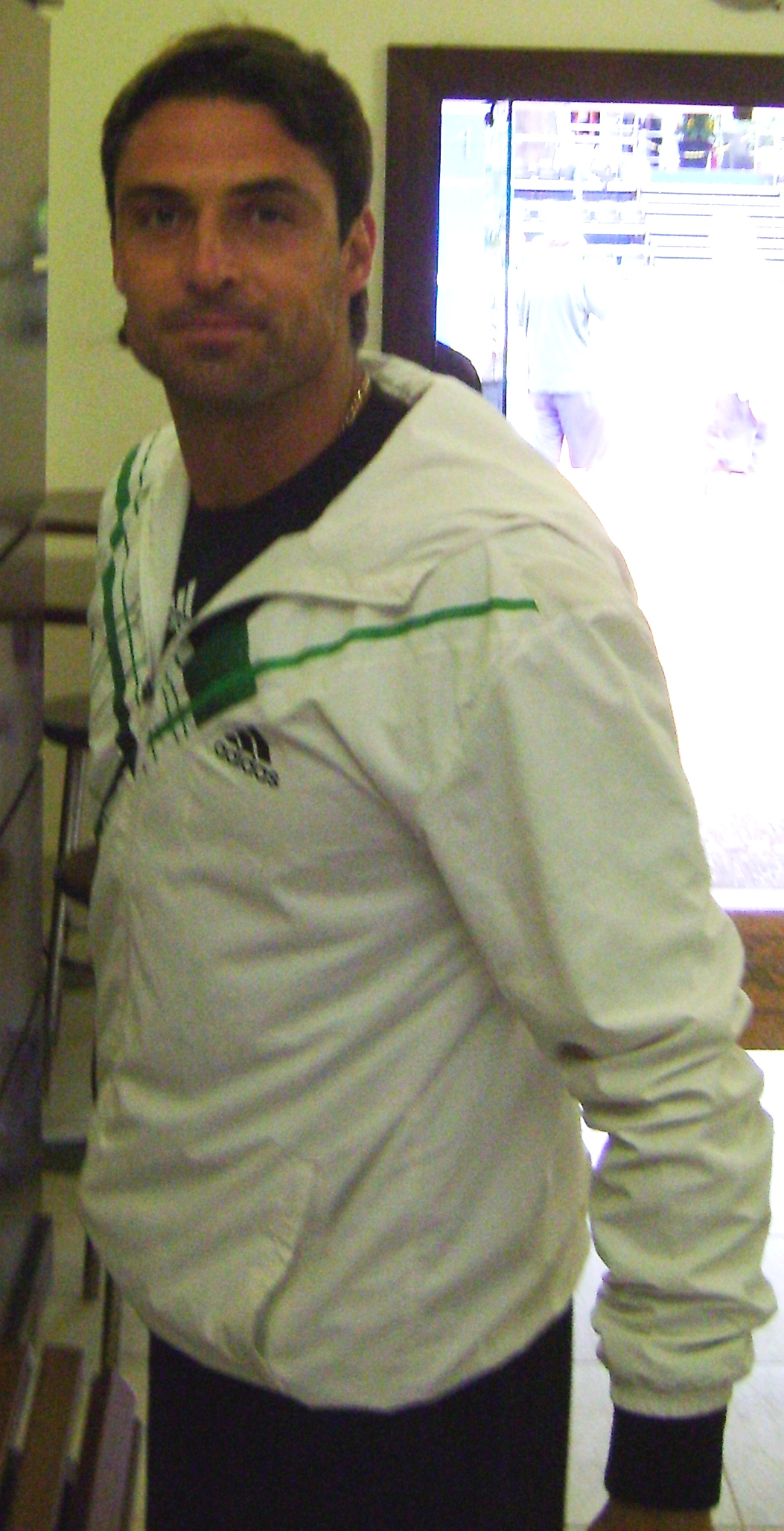
- Marcos Daniel in 2010
- Country (sports): Brazil
- Residence: Passo Fundo, Brazil
- Born: July 4, 1978 (age 46); Passo Fundo, Brazil
- Height: 1.80 m (5 ft 11 in)
- Turned pro: 1997
- Retired: 2011
- Plays: Right-handed (one-handed backhand)
- Prize money: $1,177,189

Singles
- Career record: 24–66 (at ATP Tour-level, Grand Slam-level, and in Davis Cup)
- Career titles: 0
- Highest ranking: No. 56 (14 September 2009)

Grand Slam singles results
- Australian Open: 1R (2003, 2006, 2009, 2010, 2011)
- French Open: 2R (2008)
- Wimbledon: 1R (2006, 2008, 2010)
- US Open: 1R (2006, 2008)

Other tournaments
- Olympic Games: 1R (2008)

Doubles
- Career record: 14–33 (at ATP Tour-level, Grand Slam-level, and in Davis Cup)
- Career titles: 0
- Highest ranking: No. 102 (5 December 2005)

Grand Slam doubles results
- Australian Open: 1R (2006, 2010)
- French Open: 2R (2008)
- Wimbledon: 1R (2006, 2008)
- US Open: 1R (2009)
- Last updated on: 24 July 2022.

Marcos Diniz Daniel (born July 4, 1978, in Passo Fundo, Rio Grande do Sul) is a retired professional tennis player from Brazil who turned professional in 1997. The right-hander reached his highest ATP singles ranking of World No. 56 in September 2009. He is coached by his brother, Márcio.

== Tennis career ==
Marcos Daniel's brother owns an academy for developing young tennis players, called Daniel Tennis Center where Marcos Daniel used to work as a ball catcher. He started playing youth tournaments at age 5. When he was 12, representing this academy, he reached his first final but he did not succeed in winning the title.

In August 2009, he reached the semi-finals of the ATP Gstaad tournament. He also reached the semi-finals there in 2006.

He qualified for the 2009 French Open and lost in the first round to Rafael Nadal after giving a strong performance, 5–7, 4–6, 3–6.

== ATP Challenger and ITF Futures finals ==
=== Singles: 36 (22–14) ===
Legend ATP Challenger (14–8) ITF Futures (8–6)	Finals by surface Hard (3–2) Clay (19–12) Grass (0–0) Carpet (0–0)

Result	W–L	Date	Tournament	Tier	Surface	Opponent	Score
Loss	0–1	Sep 1998	Peru F1, Lima	Futures	Clay	(Peru) Luis Horna	6–7, 4–6
Loss	0–2	Dec 1998	Brazil F7, Porto Alegre	Futures	Clay	(Austria) Thomas Schiessling	0–6, 6–7
Loss	0–3	Aug 1999	Uruguay F2, José Ignacio	Futures	Clay	(Brazil) Ricardo Mello	7–6, 5–7, 3–6
Win	1–3	Nov 1999	Brazil F1, Vitória, Espírito Santo	Futures	Clay	(Italy) Stefano Tarallo	6–3, 6–4
Loss	1–4	Jan 2000	USA F3, Boca Raton	Futures	Hard	(Georgia (country)) Irakli Labadze	4–6, 4–6
Win	2–4	Feb 2001	Mexico F1, Chetumal	Futures	Hard	(Argentina) Nicolás Todero	6–3, 6–0
Win	3–4	Jun 2001	Brazil F4, Florianópolis	Futures	Clay	(Brazil) Júlio Silva	6–7^{(4–7)}, 7–5, 7–5
Loss	3–5	Oct 2001	Lima, Peru	Challenger	Clay	(Argentina) Juan Ignacio Chela	2–6, 0–1 ret.
Win	4–5	Apr 2003	Mexico F2, Aguascalientes	Futures	Clay	(United States) Andres Pedroso	6–3, 6–4
Win	5–5	Aug 2003	Brazil F5, Fortaleza	Futures	Hard	(Mexico) Miguel Gallardo Valles	6–3, 6–3
Win	6–5	Sep 2003	Gramado, Brazil	Challenger	Hard	(Venezuela) José de Armas	7–5, 7–5
Loss	6–6	Jun 2004	Slovenia F1, Kranj	Futures	Clay	(Argentina) Carlos Berlocq	6–7^{(5–7)}, 1–6
Win	7–6	Aug 2004	Brazil F4, Florianópolis	Futures	Clay	(Brazil) Júlio Silva	7–5, 2–6, 3–2 ret.
Win	8–6	Sep 2004	Brazil F5, Curitiba	Futures	Clay	(Brazil) Lucas Engel	6–4, 6–4
Win	9–6	Sep 2004	Brazil F6, Porto Alegre	Futures	Clay	(Brazil) Thiago Alves	6–4, 6–2
Loss	9–7	Mar 2005	Brazil F2, Guarulhos	Futures	Clay	(Brazil) Franco Ferreiro	1–6, 3–6
Win	10–7	Jul 2005	Bogotá, Colombia	Challenger	Clay	(Netherlands Antilles) Jean-Julien Rojer	6–4, 6–4
Loss	10–8	Sep 2005	Seville, Spain	Challenger	Clay	(Austria) Marco Mirnegg	3–6, 0–3 ret.
Loss	10–9	Oct 2005	Quito, Ecuador	Challenger	Clay	(Brazil) Thiago Alves	6–1, 6–7^{(1–7)}, 2–6
Win	11–9	Oct 2005	Bogotá, Colombia	Challenger	Clay	(Austria) Daniel Köllerer	6–2, 6–3
Win	12–9	Nov 2005	Guayaquil, Ecuador	Challenger	Clay	(Brazil) Flávio Saretta	6–2, 1–6, 6–0
Loss	12–10	Mar 2007	Salinas, Ecuador	Challenger	Hard	(Argentina) Juan Pablo Brzezicki	4–6, 4–6
Win	13–10	Oct 2007	Bogotá, Colombia	Challenger	Clay	(Colombia) Santiago Giraldo	7–6^{(7–3)}, 6–4
Loss	13–11	Nov 2007	Buenos Aires, Argentina	Challenger	Clay	(Argentina) Sergio Roitman	1–6, 4–6
Loss	13–12	Nov 2007	Lima, Peru	Challenger	Clay	(Uruguay) Pablo Cuevas	6–0, 4–6, 3–6
Win	14–12	Mar 2008	Bogotá, Colombia	Challenger	Clay	(Spain) Iván Navarro	6–3, 1–6, 6–3
Loss	14–13	Apr 2008	Naples, Italy	Challenger	Clay	(Italy) Potito Starace	4–6, 6–4, 6–7^{(3–7)}
Win	15–13	Sep 2008	Cali, Colombia	Challenger	Clay	(Argentina) Leonardo Mayer	6–2, ret.
Win	16–13	Sep 2008	Bogotá, Colombia	Challenger	Clay	(Argentina) Horacio Zeballos	6–4, 4–6, 6–4
Win	17–13	Mar 2009	Marrakech, Morocco	Challenger	Clay	(Algeria) Lamine Ouahab	4–6, 7–5, 6–2
Win	18–13	May 2009	Zagreb, Croatia	Challenger	Clay	(Belgium) Olivier Rochus	6–3, 6–4
Win	19–13	Jul 2009	Bogotá, Colombia	Challenger	Clay	(Argentina) Horacio Zeballos	4–6, 7–6^{(7–5)}, 6–4
Win	20–13	Apr 2010	Blumenau, Brazil	Challenger	Clay	(Germany) Bastian Knittel	7–5, 6–7^{(5–7)}, 6–4
Loss	20–14	Jul 2010	Braunschweig, Germany	Challenger	Clay	(Kazakhstan) Mikhail Kukushkin	2–6, 0–3 ret.
Win	21–14	Oct 2010	São Paulo, Brazil	Challenger	Clay	(Brazil) Thomaz Bellucci	6–1, 3–6, 6–3
Win	22–14	Nov 2010	Medellín, Colombia	Challenger	Clay	(Colombia) Juan Sebastián Cabal	6–3, 7–5

=== Doubles: 23 (11–12) ===
Legend ATP Challenger (7–8) ITF Futures (4–4)	Finals by surface Hard (4–3) Clay (7–9) Grass (0–0) Carpet (0–0)

Result	W–L	Date	Tournament	Tier	Surface	Partner	Opponents	Score
Win	1–0	Sep 1998	Peru F1, Lima	Futures	Clay	(Brazil) Rodrigo Monte	(Peru) Luis Horna (United States) Rudy Rake	5–7, 7–6, 7–5
Loss	1–1	Oct 1998	Bolivia F2, Cochabamba	Futures	Clay	(Brazil) Rodrigo Monte	(Togo) Jean-Kome Loglo (Cuba) Lazaro Navarro-Batles	7–5, 4–6, 5–7
Win	2–1	Nov 1998	Brazil F3, Recife	Futures	Hard	(Brazil) Alexandre Simoni	(Germany) Rainer Gunther (Germany) Paul Hartveg	6–1, 6–2
Loss	2–2	Nov 1998	Brazil F6, Curitiba	Futures	Clay	(Brazil) Alexandre Simoni	(Brazil) Daniel Melo (Brazil) Antonio Prieto	1–6, 4–6
Win	3–2	Nov 1999	Argentina F5, Lanús	Futures	Clay	(Brazil) Ricardo Schlachter	(Argentina) Enzo Artoni (Argentina) Andrés Schneiter	7–6, 6–7, 6–3
Loss	3–3	Jan 2000	USA F3, Boca Raton	Futures	Hard	(Italy) Manuel Jorquera	(South Africa) Gareth Williams (United States) Jeff Williams	6–7^{(5–7)}, 2–6
Loss	3–4	Jun 2001	Brazil F3, São Paulo	Futures	Clay	(Brazil) Ricardo Mello	(Brazil) Adriano Ferreira (Argentina) Diego Veronelli	3–6, 4–6
Loss	3–5	Sep 2001	São Paulo, Brazil	Challenger	Clay	(Brazil) Ricardo Mello	(Brazil) Adriano Ferreira (Argentina) Edgardo Massa	walkover
Loss	3–6	Jun 2002	Eisenach, Germany	Challenger	Clay	(Chile) Adrián García	(Netherlands) Edwin Kempes (Netherlands) Martin Verkerk	3–6, 4–6
Win	4–6	Aug 2003	Belo Horizonte, Brazil	Challenger	Hard	(Brazil) Alexandre Simoni	(Japan) Kentaro Masuda (Japan) Takahiro Terachi	6–4, 6–2
Win	5–6	Sep 2003	Gramado, Brazil	Challenger	Hard	(Brazil) Alexandre Simoni	(Mexico) Santiago González (Mexico) Alejandro Hernández	7–6^{(7–5)}, 6–4
Loss	5–7	Aug 2004	Belo Horizonte, Brazil	Challenger	Hard	(Peru) Iván Miranda	(Thailand) Sonchat Ratiwatana (Thailand) Sanchai Ratiwatana	2–6, 5–7
Win	6–7	Aug 2004	Manta, Ecuador	Challenger	Hard	(Mexico) Santiago González	(United States) Eric Nunez (Venezuela) Jimy Szymanski	3–6, 6–2, 7–6^{(7–5)}
Win	7–7	Aug 2004	Brazil F4, Florianópolis	Futures	Clay	(Brazil) Alexandre Simoni	(Argentina) Brian Dabul (Argentina) Alejandro Fabbri	6–3, 7–6^{(7–3)}
Loss	7–8	Jan 2005	São Paulo, Brazil	Challenger	Hard	(Germany) Tomas Behrend	(Brazil) Bruno Soares (Brazil) André Sá	2–6, 2–6
Loss	7–9	Jan 2005	La Serena, Chile	Challenger	Clay	(Germany) Tomas Behrend	(Italy) Enzo Artoni (Paraguay) Ramón Delgado	6–7^{(2–7)}, 4–6
Loss	7–10	Apr 2005	Mexico City, Mexico	Challenger	Clay	(Brazil) Flávio Saretta	(Czech Republic) Lukáš Dlouhý (Czech Republic) Pavel Šnobel	7–5, 4–6, 3–6
Win	8–10	Apr 2005	Bogotá, Colombia	Challenger	Clay	(Mexico) Santiago González	(United States) Goran Dragicevic (United States) Mirko Pehar	7–6^{(7–4)}, 6–3
Loss	8–11	Jul 2005	Bogotá, Colombia	Challenger	Clay	(Mexico) Santiago González	(Argentina) Brian Dabul (Brazil) Marcelo Melo	4–6, 4–6
Win	9–11	Sep 2005	Seville, Spain	Challenger	Clay	(Spain) Fernando Vicente	(Italy) Flavio Cipolla (Italy) Alessandro Motti	6–2, 6–7^{(1–7)}, 7–5
Win	10–11	Oct 2005	Bogotá, Colombia	Challenger	Clay	(Mexico) Santiago González	(Portugal) Fred Gil (Brazil) Marcelo Melo	6–2, 7–5
Win	11–11	Oct 2007	Quito, Ecuador	Challenger	Clay	(Argentina) Brian Dabul	(United States) Hugo Armando (Brazil) Ricardo Mello	4–6, 7–5, [10–7]
Loss	11–12	Jul 2009	Bogotá, Colombia	Challenger	Clay	(Brazil) Ricardo Mello	(Argentina) Sebastián Prieto (Argentina) Horacio Zeballos	4–6, 5–7

== Performance timeline ==
Key
W	F	SF	QF	#R	RR	Q#	P#	DNQ	A	Z#	PO	G	S	B	NMS	NTI	P	NH

(W) winner; (F) finalist; (SF) semifinalist; (QF) quarterfinalist; (#R) rounds 4, 3, 2, 1; (RR) round-robin stage; (Q#) qualification round; (P#) preliminary round; (DNQ) did not qualify; (A) absent; (Z#) Davis/Fed Cup Zonal Group (with number indication) or (PO) play-off; (G) gold, (S) silver or (B) bronze Olympic/Paralympic medal; (NMS) not a Masters tournament; (NTI) not a Tier I tournament; (P) postponed; (NH) not held; (SR) strike rate (events won / competed); (W–L) win–loss record.

=== Singles ===
Tournament	2002	2003	2004	2005	2006	2007	2008	2009	2010	2011	SR	W–L	Win%
Grand Slam tournaments
Australian Open	Q2	1R	Q2	A	1R	A	A	1R	1R	1R	0 / 5	0–5	0%
French Open	Q1	Q1	A	1R	1R	1R	2R	1R	Q1	A	0 / 5	1–5	17%
Wimbledon	A	Q2	Q2	Q1	1R	A	1R	A	1R	A	0 / 3	0–3	0%
US Open	Q3	Q1	A	Q2	1R	A	1R	1R	A	A	0 / 3	0–3	0%
Win–loss	0–0	0–1	0–0	0–1	0–4	0–1	1–3	0–3	0–2	0–1	0 / 16	1–16	6%
Olympic Games
Summer Olympics	NH		A	Not Held			1R	Not Held			0 / 1	0–1	0%
ATP Tour Masters 1000
Indian Wells	A	A	A	A	A	A	A	A	1R	A	0 / 1	0–1	0%
Miami	A	A	A	A	3R	A	A	A	1R	A	0 / 1	0–1	0%
Win–loss	0–0	0–0	0–0	0–0	0–0	0–0	0–0	0–0	0–2	0–0	0 / 2	0–2	0%
