= 2000 ATP Challenger Series =

Tennis tour

Details
- Duration: 24 January 2000 – 10 December 2000
- Edition: 23rd
- Tournaments: 121

Achievements (singles)

The ATP Challenger Series is the second tier tour for professional tennis organised by the Association of Tennis Professionals (ATP). The 2000 ATP Challenger Series calendar comprised 121 tournaments, with prize money ranging from $25,000 up to $125,000.

== Schedule ==
=== January ===
Date	Country	Tournament	Prizemoney	Surface	Singles champion	Doubles champions
24.01.	Germany	Heilbronn Open; Main Draw - Qualifying	$ 100,000	Carpet (i)	(Sweden) Magnus Larsson	(Netherlands) Jan Siemerink (Netherlands) John van Lottum
24.01.	United States	Waikoloa Challenger; Main Draw - Qualifying	$ 50,000	Hard	(United States) Paul Goldstein	(United States) Jim Grabb (United States) Richey Reneberg
31.01.	United States	Amarillo Challenger; Main Draw - Qualifying	$ 37.500	Hard (i)	(United States) Michael Russell	(Australia) Brian MacPhie (Australia) Michael Hill
31.01.	Germany	Warsteiner Challenger; Main Draw - Qualifying	$ 25,000	Carpet (i)	(Germany) Alexander Popp	(Czech Republic) Tomáš Cibulec (Czech Republic) Leoš Friedl

=== February ===
Date	Country	Tournament	Prizemoney	Surface	Singles champion	Doubles champions
07.02.	Germany	Volkswagen Challenger; Main Draw - Qualifying	$ 25,000	Carpet (i)	(Russia) Andrei Stoliarov	(Germany) Jan-Ralph Brandt (Germany) Martin Sinner
14.02.	Poland	Wrocław Challenger; Main Draw - Qualifying	$ 75,000	Hard (i)	(Czech Republic) Martin Damm	(Czech Republic) Petr Kovačka (Czech Republic) Pavel Kudrnáč
14.02.	India	Kolkata Challenger; Main Draw - Qualifying	$ 25,000	Grass	(Finland) Tuomas Ketola	(Israel) Andy Ram (Israel) Nir Welgreen
14.02.	Great Britain	Hull Challenger; Main Draw - Qualifying	$ 25,000	Carpet (i)	(Sweden) Henrik Andersson	(United Kingdom) Barry Cowan (South Africa) Neville Godwin
14.02.	Germany	Warsteiner Challenger Lübeck; Main Draw - Qualifying	$ 25,000	Carpet (i)	(Germany) Christian Vinck	(Italy) Giorgio Galimberti (Italy) Diego Nargiso
21.02.	Vietnam	Ho Chi Minh Challenger; Main Draw - Qualifying	$ 50,000	Hard	(Czech Republic) Jiří Vaněk	(Australia) Michael Hill (Australia) Todd Woodbridge
21.02.	India	Ahmedabad Challenger; Main Draw - Qualifying	$ 25,000	Hard	(Uzbekistan) Vadim Kutsenko	(France) Cedric Kauffmann (India) Syed Fazaluddin
28.02.	Singapore	Singapore Challenger; Main Draw - Qualifying	$ 50,000	Hard	(Australia) Todd Woodbridge	(South Africa) Neville Godwin (Australia) Michael Hill
28.02.	France	Cherbourg Challenger; Main Draw - Qualifying	$ 37.500	Hard (i)	(France) Julien Boutter	(France) Julien Boutter (France) Michaël Llodra
28.02.	India	Mumbai Challenger; Main Draw - Qualifying	$ 25,000	Hard	(India) Leander Paes	(Czech Republic) Tomáš Anzari (Japan) Satoshi Iwabuchi

=== March ===
Date	Country	Tournament	Prizemoney	Surface	Singles champion	Doubles champions
06.03.	France	Besançon Challenger; Main Draw - Qualifying	$ 25,000	Hard (i)	(France) Julien Boutter	(France) Julien Boutter (France) Michaël Llodra
06.03.	Japan	Kyoto Challenger; Main Draw - Qualifying	$ 25,000	Carpet (i)	(Zimbabwe) Kevin Ullyett	(Slovakia) Martin Hromec (United Kingdom) Tom Spinks
13.03.	Portugal	Lisbon Challenger; Main Draw - Qualifying	$ 25,000	Clay	(Spain) David Sánchez	(Portugal) João Cunha e Silva (Portugal) Nuno Marques
13.03.	Germany	Residenza Open Magdeburg; Main Draw - Qualifying	$ 25,000	Carpet (i)	(Canada) Sébastien Lareau	(Germany) Karsten Braasch (Germany) Dirk Dier
13.03.	Ecuador	Salinas Challenger; Main Draw - Qualifying	$ 25,000	Hard	(Italy) Davide Sanguinetti	(Spain) Joan Balcells (Colombia) Mauricio Hadad
20.03.	New Zealand	Hamilton Challenger; Main Draw - Qualifying	$ 25,000	Hard	(United States) Michael Joyce	(South Africa) Neville Godwin (Australia) Michael Hill
27.03.	Italy	Barletta Challenger	$ 25,000	Clay	(Spain) Germán Puentes	(Czech Republic) Petr Kovačka (Czech Republic) Pavel Kudrnáč

=== April ===
Date	Country	Tournament	Prizemoney	Surface	Singles champion	Doubles champions
03.04.	Italy	Cagliari Challenger	$ 75,000	Clay	(Italy) Andrea Gaudenzi	(Czech Republic) Tomáš Cibulec (Czech Republic) Leoš Friedl
10.04.	Mexico	San Luis Potosí Challenger	$ 50,000	Clay	(Argentina) Agustín Calleri	(Venezuela) José de Armas (Venezuela) Jimy Szymanski
24.04.	Portugal	Maia Challenger	$ 125,000	Clay	(Italy) Andrea Gaudenzi	(Czech Republic) Tomáš Cibulec (Czech Republic) Leoš Friedl
24.04.	Bermuda	XL Bermuda Open	$ 100,000	Clay	(Australia) Andrew Ilie	(India) Leander Paes (Netherlands) Jan Siemerink

=== May ===
Date	Country	Tournament	Prizemoney	Surface	Singles champion	Doubles champions
08.05.	Slovenia	Ljubljana Challenger	$ 100,000	Clay	(Germany) Oliver Gross	(Spain) Emilio Benfele Álvarez (Spain) Álex López Morón
08.05.	United States	Birmingham Challenger	$ 50,000	Clay	(Haiti) Ronald Agénor	(Australia) Paul Kilderry (Australia) Peter Tramacchi
08.05.	Uzbekistan	Fergana Challenger	$ 25,000	Hard	(Belarus) Vladimir Voltchkov	(Israel) Jonathan Erlich (Israel) Lior Mor
15.05.	United States	Armonk Challenger	$ 50,000	Clay	(Spain) Salvador Navarro	(Australia) Paul Kilderry (Australia) Peter Tramacchi
15.05.	Israel	Jerusalem Challenger	$ 50,000	Hard	(Zimbabwe) Kevin Ullyett	(South Africa) Jeff Coetzee (Finland) Tuomas Ketola
15.05.	Croatia	Zagreb Challenger	$ 50,000	Clay	(Argentina) Gastón Etlis	(France) Michaël Llodra (Italy) Diego Nargiso
15.05.	Great Britain	Edinburgh Challenger	$ 25,000	Clay	(Belgium) Filip Dewulf	(Spain) Tommy Robredo (United States) Michael Russell
15.05.	Uzbekistan	Samarkand Challenger	$ 25,000	Clay	(Russia) Mikhail Youzhny	(Italy) Stefano Galvani (Russia) Andrei Stoliarov
22.05.	Hungary	Budapest Challenger I	$ 25,000	Clay	(Netherlands) Edwin Kempes	(Japan) Thomas Shimada (South Africa) Myles Wakefield

=== June ===
Date	Country	Tournament	Prizemoney	Surface	Singles champion	Doubles champions
05.06.	Czech Republic	Prostějov Challenger	$ 100,000	Clay	(Sweden) Andreas Vinciguerra	(Spain) Alberto Martín (Israel) Eyal Ran
05.06.	Germany	Quelle Cup	$ 50,000	Clay	(Georgia (country)) Irakli Labadze	(Spain) Eduardo Nicolás (Spain) Germán Puentes
05.06.	Great Britain	Surbiton Challenger	$ 50,000	Grass	(Australia) Wayne Arthurs	(South Africa) Jeff Coetzee (South Africa) Marcos Ondruska
05.06.	United States	Tallahassee Challenger	$ 50,000	Hard	(United States) Jeff Salzenstein	(The Bahamas) Mark Knowles (The Bahamas) Mark Merklein
12.06.	Poland	Szczecin Challenger	$ 125,000	Clay	(Czech Republic) Bohdan Ulihrach	(Spain) Alberto Martín (Israel) Eyal Ran
12.06.	Germany	ATU Cup	$ 75,000	Clay	(Germany) Daniel Elsner	(New Zealand) Mark Nielsen (Russia) Andrei Stoliarov
12.06.	United States	Denver Challenger	$ 50,000	Hard	(Israel) Lior Mor	(Israel) Jonathan Erlich (Israel) Lior Mor
12.06.	Portugal	Espinho Challenger	$ 50,000	Clay	(Spain) Tommy Robredo	(Portugal) Emanuel Couto (Portugal) Bernardo Mota
19.06.	Germany	Nord/LB Open	$ 125,000	Clay	(Argentina) Gastón Gaudio	(Germany) Jens Knippschild (United States) Jeff Tarango
19.06.	Switzerland	Lugano Challenger	$ 25,000	Clay	(Spain) David Sánchez	(Uzbekistan) Vadim Kutsenko (Uzbekistan) Oleg Ogorodov
26.06.	Germany	Wartburg Open	$ 25,000	Clay	(Norway) Jan Frode Andersen	(Brazil) Daniel Melo (Brazil) Alexandre Simoni
26.06.	Italy	Sassuolo Challenger	$ 25,000	Clay	(Italy) Stefano Tarallo	(Spain) Álex Calatrava (Spain) Salvador Navarro

=== July ===
Date	Country	Tournament	Prizemoney	Surface	Singles champion	Doubles champions
03.07.	Italy	Venice Challenger	$ 100,000	Clay	(Argentina) Agustín Calleri	(Spain) Julián Alonso (North Macedonia) Aleksandar Kitinov
03.07.	Germany	Müller Cup	$ 50,000	Clay	(Spain) Germán Puentes	(Bulgaria) Orlin Stanoytchev (Russia) Mikhail Youzhny
03.07.	France	Montauban Challenger	$ 25,000	Clay	(Monaco) Jean-René Lisnard	(Australia) Lee Pearson (Australia) Grant Silcock
10.07.	Belgium	Ostend Challenger	$ 75,000	Clay	(Belgium) Olivier Rochus	(Australia) Tim Crichton (Australia) Ashley Fisher
10.07.	Netherlands	Scheveningen Challenger	$ 75,000	Clay	(France) Nicolas Coutelot	(Australia) Paul Hanley (Australia) Nathan Healey
10.07.	Great Britain	Bristol Challenger	$ 50,000	Grass	(Israel) Andy Ram	(Australia) Jordan Kerr (South Africa) Damien Roberts
10.07.	Canada	Granby Challenger	$ 50,000	Hard	(Japan) Takao Suzuki	(South Korea) Lee Hyung-taik (South Korea) Yoon Yong-il
10.07.	Germany	Oberstaufen Cup	$ 25,000	Clay	(Austria) Clemens Trimmel	(United States) Hugo Armando (Brazil) Alexandre Simoni
17.07.	United States	Aptos Challenger	$ 50,000	Hard	(United States) Bob Bryan	(United States) Bob Bryan (United States) Mike Bryan
17.07.	Great Britain	Manchester Challenger	$ 50,000	Grass	(Italy) Mosé Navarra	(Australia) Dejan Petrović (Israel) Andy Ram
17.07.	France	Contrexéville Challenger	$ 37.500	Clay	(Italy) Vincenzo Santopadre	(France) Julien Benneteau (France) Nicolas Mahut
24.07.	Turkey	Istanbul Challenger	$ 75,000	Hard	(Zimbabwe) Wayne Black	(Israel) Noam Behr (Israel) Eyal Erlich
24.07.	Spain	Córdoba Challenger	$ 50,000	Hard	(Belgium) Réginald Willems	(Australia) Dejan Petrović (Israel) Andy Ram
24.07.	Finland	Tampere Challenger	$ 50,000	Clay	(Belgium) Johan Van Herck	(Finland) Ville Liukko (Finland) Jarkko Nieminen
24.07.	United States	Winnetka Challenger	$ 50,000	Hard	(Japan) Takao Suzuki	(South Korea) Lee Hyung-taik (South Korea) Yoon Yong-il
31.07.	Poland	Poznań Challenger	$ 100,000	Clay	(Belgium) Christophe Rochus	(Czech Republic) Petr Pála (Czech Republic) Pavel Vízner
31.07.	Spain	Open Castilla y León	$ 100,000	Hard	(Spain) Sergi Bruguera	(Australia) Ashley Fisher (South Africa) Jason Weir-Smith
31.07.	United States	Lexington Challenger	$ 50,000	Hard	(Japan) Takao Suzuki	(Switzerland) Lorenzo Manta (Italy) Laurence Tieleman
31.07.	Brazil	Gramado Challenger	$ 25,000	Hard	(Brazil) Alexandre Simoni	(Brazil) André Sá (United States) Eric Taino
31.07.	Great Britain	Wrexham Challenger	$ 25,000	Hard	(Australia) Wayne Arthurs	(Italy) Daniele Bracciali (Pakistan) Aisam-ul-Haq Qureshi

=== August ===
Date	Country	Tournament	Prizemoney	Surface	Singles champion	Doubles champions
07.08.	United States	Binghamton Challenger	$ 50,000	Hard	(Japan) Takao Suzuki	(South Africa) Justin Bower (South Africa) Jeff Coetzee
07.08.	Czech Republic	Prague Challenger I	$ 50,000	Clay	(Spain) Albert Montañés	(Czech Republic) František Čermák (Czech Republic) Ota Fukárek
07.08.	Poland	Sopot Challenger	$ 50,000	Clay	(United States) Hugo Armando	(Argentina) Sergio Roitman (Argentina) Andrés Schneiter
07.08.	Brazil	Belo Horizonte Challenger	$ 25,000	Hard	(Federal Republic of Yugoslavia) Nenad Zimonjić	(Brazil) Daniel Melo (Brazil) Alexandre Simoni
07.08.	Russia	Togliatti Challenger	$ 25,000	Hard	(Uzbekistan) Vadim Kutsenko	(Federal Republic of Yugoslavia) Dušan Vemić (Croatia) Lovro Zovko
14.08.	Ukraine	Kyiv Challenger	$ 100,000	Clay	(Spain) Jacobo Díaz	(Argentina) Cristian Kordasz (Hungary) Gábor Köves
14.08.	United States	Bronx Challenger	$ 50,000	Hard	(South Korea) Lee Hyung-taik	(Czech Republic) Petr Luxa (South Africa) Wesley Whitehouse
14.08.	Italy	Bressanone Challenger	$ 25,000	Clay	(Czech Republic) František Čermák	(Australia) Jordan Kerr (South Africa) Damien Roberts
14.08.	Germany	Volvo Sylt Open	$ 25,000	Clay	(Russia) Yuri Schukin	(Romania) Ionuț Moldovan (Russia) Yuri Schukin
21.08.	Switzerland	Geneva Challenger	$ 50,000	Clay	(France) Nicolas Thomann	(Argentina) Diego del Río (Argentina) Edgardo Massa
21.08.	Italy	Manerbio Challenger	$ 25,000	Clay	(Italy) Stefano Tarallo	(Australia) Jordan Kerr (South Africa) Damien Roberts
21.08.	Germany	BMW Challenger Open	$ 25,000	Clay	(Russia) Nikolay Davydenko	(Spain) Emilio Benfele Álvarez (Peru) Luis Horna
28.08.	Germany	Black Forest Open	$ 37.500	Clay	(Czech Republic) Michal Tabara	(Romania) Ionuț Moldovan (Russia) Yuri Schukin
28.08.	Hungary	Budapest Challenger II	$ 25,000	Clay	(Argentina) Diego Moyano	(Argentina) Sergio Roitman (Argentina) Andrés Schneiter

=== September ===
Date	Country	Tournament	Prizemoney	Surface	Singles champion	Doubles champions
04.09.	Austria	Graz Challenger	$ 100,000	Clay	(Czech Republic) Michal Tabara	(Czech Republic) Tomáš Cibulec (Czech Republic) Leoš Friedl
04.09.	Germany	Rhein-Main Challenger	$ 37.500	Clay	(France) Nicolas Coutelot	(Czech Republic) Petr Luxa (Czech Republic) David Škoch
04.09.	Bulgaria	Sofia Challenger	$ 25,000	Clay	(Italy) Stefano Tarallo	(Australia) Dejan Petrović (Bulgaria) Orlin Stanoytchev
11.09.	Austria	Linz Challenger	$ 75,000	Clay	(Spain) Germán Puentes	(Austria) Julian Knowle (Austria) Thomas Strengberger
11.09.	North Macedonia	Skopje Challenger	$ 25,000	Clay	(Germany) Oliver Gross	(Argentina) Enzo Artoni (Argentina) Sergio Roitman
18.09.	Italy	Biella Challenger	$ 100,000	Clay	(Italy) Filippo Volandri	(Argentina) Martín García (Argentina) Mariano Puerta
18.09.	United States	Houston Challenger	$ 50,000	Hard	(United States) James Blake	(South Africa) Brent Haygarth (South Africa) Marcos Ondruska
18.09.	Romania	Brașov Challenger	$ 25,000	Clay	(Brazil) Alexandre Simoni	(Romania) Ionuț Moldovan (Russia) Yuri Schukin
25.09.	United States	San Antonio Challenger	$ 50,000	Hard	(Belgium) Xavier Malisse	(South Africa) Wesley Whitehouse (South Africa) Gareth Williams
25.09.	Spain	Copa Sevilla	$ 37.500	Clay	(Spain) Tommy Robredo	(Spain) Eduardo Nicolás (Spain) Germán Puentes

=== October ===
Date	Country	Tournament	Prizemoney	Surface	Singles champion	Doubles champions
02.10.	Spain	Barcelona Challenger	$ 100,000	Clay	(Spain) Albert Portas	(Spain) Tomás Carbonell (Spain) Albert Portas
02.10.	Slovakia	Slovak Open	$ 100,000	Hard	(Italy) Davide Sanguinetti	(Australia) Paul Hanley (South Africa) Paul Rosner
02.10.	United States	Austin Challenger	$ 50,000	Hard	(United States) Andy Roddick	(Australia) Tim Crichton (Australia) Ashley Fisher
02.10.	Morocco	Tangier Challenger	$ 25,000	Clay	(Austria) Werner Eschauer	(Romania) Ionuț Moldovan (Russia) Yuri Schukin
09.10.	Egypt	Cairo Challenger	$ 100,000	Clay	(Spain) Albert Portas	(Spain) Albert Portas (Spain) Álex López Morón
09.10.	Mexico	Guadalajara Challenger	$ 100,000	Clay	(Brazil) Fernando Meligeni	(United States) Hugo Armando (Germany) Alexander Waske
09.10.	France	Grenoble Challenger	$ 75,000	Hard (i)	(France) Antony Dupuis	(Austria) Julian Knowle (Switzerland) Lorenzo Manta
09.10.	United States	Tulsa Challenger	$ 50,000	Hard	(Venezuela) Jimy Szymanski	(Mexico) Enrique Abaroa (United States) Michael Sell
09.10.	Uzbekistan	Bukhara Challenger	$ 25,000	Hard	(Israel) Noam Behr	(Uzbekistan) Vadim Kutsenko (Uzbekistan) Oleg Ogorodov
16.10.	Peru	Lima Challenger	$ 100,000	Clay	(Argentina) Guillermo Coria	(Argentina) Gastón Etlis (Argentina) Martín Rodríguez
16.10.	Germany	Okal Cup	$ 25,000	Carpet (i)	(Germany) Jens Knippschild	(Germany) Karsten Braasch (Germany) Jens Knippschild
23.10.	Brazil	São Paulo Challenger	$ 100,000	Clay	(Argentina) Guillermo Coria	(Argentina) Mariano Hood (Argentina) Sebastián Prieto
30.10.	Belgium	Charleroi Challenger	$ 100,000	Carpet (i)	(Netherlands) Jan Siemerink	(Czech Republic) Petr Pála (Czech Republic) Pavel Vízner
30.10.	United States	Las Vegas Challenger	$ 50,000	Hard	(South Africa) Neville Godwin	(South Africa) Jeff Coetzee (South Africa) Marcos Ondruska
30.10.	Ecuador	Quito Challenger	$ 25,000	Clay	(United States) Hugo Armando	(Brazil) Francisco Costa (Georgia (country)) Irakli Labadze
30.10.	Japan	Yokohama Challenger	$ 25,000	Carpet (i)	(United States) Eric Taino	(Switzerland) Yves Allegro (Austria) Julian Knowle

=== November ===
Date	Country	Tournament	Prizemoney	Surface	Singles champion	Doubles champions
06.11.	Chile	Santiago Challenger	$ 100,000	Clay	(Argentina) Diego Moyano	(Georgia (country)) Irakli Labadze (Federal Republic of Yugoslavia) Dušan Vemić
06.11.	United States	Burbank Challenger	$ 50,000	Hard	(United States) Andy Roddick	(The Bahamas) Mark Merklein (United States) Mitch Sprengelmeyer
06.11.	South Korea	Seoul Challenger	$ 50,000	Hard	(South Korea) Lee Hyung-taik	(Australia) Tim Crichton (Australia) Ashley Fisher
13.11.	Uruguay	Montevideo Challenger	$ 100,000	Clay	(Argentina) Guillermo Coria	(Argentina) Lucas Arnold Ker (Argentina) Gastón Etlis
13.11.	Germany	Lambertz Open by STAWAG	$ 50,000	Carpet (i)	(Germany) Rainer Schüttler	(Netherlands) Sander Groen (Netherlands) Jan Siemerink
13.11.	Japan	Osaka Challenger	$ 25,000	Hard	(Switzerland) Michel Kratochvil	(Czech Republic) František Čermák (Czech Republic) Ota Fukárek
13.11.	United States	Rancho Mirage Challenger	$ 25,000	Hard	(United States) James Blake	(The Bahamas) Mark Merklein (United States) Mitch Sprengelmeyer
20.11.	France	Brest Challenger	$ 100,000	Hard (i)	(Switzerland) Michel Kratochvil	(Finland) Tuomas Ketola (Italy) Laurence Tieleman
20.11.	Argentina	Buenos Aires Challenger	$ 100,000	Clay	(Argentina) Guillermo Coria	(Argentina) Pablo Albano (Argentina) Lucas Arnold Ker
20.11.	United States	Knoxville Challenger	$ 50,000	Hard (i)	(Italy) Cristiano Caratti	(Germany) Karsten Braasch (Germany) Michael Kohlmann
20.11.	Mexico	Puebla Challenger	$ 25,000	Hard	(United States) Brandon Hawk	(United States) Zack Fleishman (United States) Jeff Williams
27.11.	United States	Urbana Challenger	$ 50,000	Hard (i)	(United States) Jeff Salzenstein	(United States) Taylor Dent (United States) Mardy Fish

=== December ===
Date	Country	Tournament	Prizemoney	Surface	Singles champion	Doubles champions
04.12.	Costa Rica	Costa Rica Challenger	$ 100,000	Hard	(France) Antony Dupuis	(Argentina) Guillermo Cañas (Chile) Adrián García
04.12.	Italy	Milan Challenger	$ 50,000	Carpet (i)	(Italy) Mosé Navarra	(Switzerland) George Bastl (Italy) Giorgio Galimberti
04.12.	Czech Republic	Prague Challenger II	$ 25,000	Hard (i)	(Czech Republic) Jan Vacek	(Denmark) Kristian Pless (Pakistan) Aisam-ul-Haq Qureshi
