= 2001 Copa Ericsson Chile =

- Date: 29 October – 4 November
- Category: ATP Challenger Series
- Surface: Clay
- Location: Santiago, Chile
- Venue: Club de Polo y Equitación San Cristóbal

Champions

Singles
- (Chile) Marcelo Ríos

Doubles
- (Brazil) André Sá / (Brazil) Alexandre Simoni
- Copa Ericsson Chile

The 2001 Copa Ericsson was a professional tennis tournament played on clay courts. The tournament was part of the 2001 ATP Challenger Series. It took place at the Club de Polo y Equitación San Cristóbal in Santiago, Chile between 29 October and 4 November 2001.

The most notable event in this edition is the participation of former No. 1 Marcelo Ríos in the tournament, after a five-year absence from the ATP Challenger Series tournaments. Ríos would also try to end his curse of not obtaining a title at his home country, after being runner-up at the Chile Open three times in 1995, 1996 and 1997.

== Singles main-draw entrants ==
=== Seeds ===
| Country | Player | Rank^{1} | Seed |
|---|---|---|---|
| CHI | Marcelo Ríos | 44 | 1 |
| ARG | David Nalbandian | 52 | 2 |
| ARG | Mariano Zabaleta | 60 | 3 |
| ARG | José Acasuso | 84 | 4 |
| ~~ARG~~ | ~~Juan Ignacio Chela~~ | ~~85~~ | ~~5~~ |
| BRA | Alexandre Simoni | 98 | 6 |
| BRA | André Sá | 100 | 7 |
| ARG | Agustín Calleri | 102 | 8 |
| BRA | Flávio Saretta | 112 | 9 |

- ^{1} Rankings are as of 22 October 2001.

=== Other entrants ===
The following players received wildcards into the singles main draw:

- (Chile) Jorge Aguilar
- (Chile) Hermes Gamonal
- (Chile) Adrián García
- (Chile) Marcelo Ríos

The following players received entry from the qualifying draw:

- (Argentina) ~~Diego Moyano~~
- (Argentina) Sebastián Prieto
- (Argentina) Sergio Roitman
- (Federal Republic of Yugoslavia) Dušan Vemić

The following players received entry as lucky losers into the singles main draw:

- (Argentina) Gastón Etlis
- (Spain) Didac Pérez

The following players received entry as a Special Exempt into the singles main draw:

- (Norway) Jan Frode Andersen
- (Argentina) Cristian Kordasz

== Doubles main-draw entrants ==
=== Seeds ===
| Country | Player | Country | Player | Rank^{1} | Seed |
|---|---|---|---|---|---|
| ARG | Enzo Artoni | ITA | Andrés Schneiter | 175 | 1 |
| BRA | André Sá | BRA | Alexandre Simoni | 258 | 2 |
| BRA | Daniel Melo | (Federal Republic of Yugoslavia) YUG | Dušan Vemić | 276 | 3 |
| ARG | Diego del Río | ARG | Mariano Hood | 293 | 4 |

- Rankings are as of 22 October 2001.

=== Other entrants ===
The following pairs received wildcards into the doubles main draw:

- (Chile) Hermes Gamonal / (Chile) Fernando González
- (Chile) Miguel Miranda / (Chile) Julio Peralta
- (Chile) Felipe Parada / (Chile) Juan Felipe Yáñez

The following pair received entry as alternates into the doubles main draw:

- (Brazil) Ricardo Mello / (Brazil) Flávio Saretta

== Champions ==
=== Singles ===
- (Chile) Marcelo Ríos defeated (Argentina) Edgardo Massa, 6–4, 6–2.

=== Doubles ===
- (Brazil) André Sá / (Brazil) Alexandre Simoni defeated (Brazil) Daniel Melo / (Federal Republic of Yugoslavia) Dušan Vemić, 3–6, 6–3, 7–6^{(7–3)}
