= 2001 Copa Ericsson Chile – Singles =

Singles
- 2001 Copa Ericsson Chile

Final
- Champion: (Chile) Marcelo Ríos
- Runner-up: (Argentina) Edgardo Massa
- Score: 6–4, 6–2

Events
Singles	Doubles
← 2000 ·	Copa Ericsson Chile	· 2002 →

Diego Moyano was the defending champion, but was forced to withdraw due to an injury.

Marcelo Ríos won the title by defeating Edgardo Massa 6–4, 6–2 in the final.

== Seeds ==
1. (Chile) Marcelo Ríos (champion)
2. (Argentina) David Nalbandian (second round)
3. (Argentina) Mariano Zabaleta (second round)
4. (Argentina) José Acasuso (quarterfinals)
5. (Argentina) ~~Juan Ignacio Chela~~ (withdrew due to a foot injury)
6. (Brazil) Alexandre Simoni (quarterfinals)
7. (Brazil) André Sá (semifinals)
8. (Argentina) Agustín Calleri (semifinals)
9. (Brazil) Flávio Saretta (second round)

== Draw ==
=== Key ===
- Q = Qualifier
- WC = Wild card
- LL = Lucky loser
- Alt = Alternate
- SE = Special exempt
- PR = Protected ranking
- ITF = ITF entry
- JE = Junior exempt
- w/o = Walkover
- r = Retired
- d = Defaulted
- SR = Special ranking

=== Finals ===
Semifinals
1/WC	(Chile) Marcelo Ríos	6	7
8	(Argentina) Agustín Calleri	4	5
7	(Brazil) André Sá	2	3
(Argentina) Edgardo Massa	6	6

Final
1/WC	(Chile) Marcelo Ríos	6	6
(Argentina) Edgardo Massa	4	2

=== Top half ===
First round
1/WC	(Chile) M Ríos	4	6	7
(Chile) F González	6	4	5
WC	(Chile) A García	7	6
(Brazil) D Melo	5	4
Q	(Federal Republic of Yugoslavia) D Vemić	7^{7}	6
(Costa Rica) JA Marín	6^{5}	4
(Peru) L Horna	4	3
6	(Brazil) A Simoni	6	6
3	(Argentina) M Zabaleta	6^{5}	6	6
(Spain) M López	7^{7}	2	1
SE	(Norway) JF Andersen	6	7^{8}
(United States) H Armando	4	6^{6}
WC	(Chile) H Gamonal	6	1	4
(Brazil) R Mello	4	6	6
Q	(Argentina) S Roitman	4	6^{6}
8	(Argentina) A Calleri	6	7^{8}

Second round
1/WC	(Chile) M Ríos	6	6
WC	(Chile) A García	3	1
Q	(Federal Republic of Yugoslavia) D Vemić	6	2	3
6	(Brazil) A Simoni	3	6	6
3	(Argentina) M Zabaleta	3	7^{7}	3
SE	(Norway) JF Andersen	6	6^{0}	6
(Brazil) R Mello	4	3
8	(Argentina) A Calleri	6	6

Quarterfinals
1/WC	(Chile) M Ríos	6	6
6	(Brazil) A Simoni	0	4
SE	(Norway) JF Andersen	2	4
8	(Argentina) A Calleri	6	6

Semifinals
1/WC	(Chile) M Ríos	6	7
8	(Argentina) A Calleri	4	5

=== Bottom half ===
First round
7	(Brazil) A Sá	3
(Spain) G Puentes	0	r
(Germany) T Behrend	6^{4}	3
Q	(Argentina) S Prieto	7^{7}	6
(Argentina) F Browne	4	6	6
LL	(Argentina) G Etlis	6	3	2
(Italy) S Galvani	3	2
4	(Argentina) J Acasuso	6	6
9	(Brazil) F Saretta	4	6	6
WC	(Chile) J Aguilar	6	3	2
(Argentina) E Massa	6	0	6
LL	(Spain) D Pérez	4	6	2
SE	(Argentina) C Kordasz	6	7
(Spain) F López	4	5
(Germany) O Gross	4	4
2	(Argentina) D Nalbandian	6	6

Second round
7	(Brazil) A Sá	6	6
Q	(Argentina) S Prieto	4	2
(Argentina) F Browne	2	2
4	(Argentina) J Acasuso	6	6
9	(Brazil) F Saretta	5	6	4
(Argentina) E Massa	7	1	6
SE	(Argentina) C Kordasz	3	7^{7}	7^{7}
2	(Argentina) D Nalbandian	6	6^{5}	6^{5}

Quarterfinals
7	(Brazil) A Sá	7^{7}	6
4	(Argentina) J Acasuso	6^{5}	4
(Argentina) E Massa	6	4	7
SE	(Argentina) C Kordasz	3	6	5

Semifinals
7	(Brazil) A Sá	2	3
(Argentina) E Massa	6	6
