= 2001 Copa Ericsson Chile – Doubles =

Doubles
- 2001 Copa Ericsson Chile

Final
- Champions: (Brazil) André Sá (Brazil) Alexandre Simoni
- Runners-up: (Brazil) Daniel Melo (Federal Republic of Yugoslavia) Dušan Vemić
- Score: 3–6, 6–3, 7–6^{(7–3)}

Events
Singles	Doubles
← 2000 ·	Copa Ericsson Chile	· 2002 →

Irakli Labadze and Dušan Vemić were the defending champions, but Labadze decided to compete in Aachen, Germany at the same week.

Vemić teamed up with Daniel Melo and lost in the final to André Sá and Alexandre Simoni. The score was 3–6, 6–3, 7–6^{(7–3)}.

== Seeds ==
1. (Argentina) Enzo Artoni / (Italy) Andrés Schneiter (quarterfinals)
2. (Brazil) André Sá / (Brazil) Alexandre Simoni (champions)
3. (Brazil) Daniel Melo / (Federal Republic of Yugoslavia) Dušan Vemić (final)
4. (Argentina) Diego del Río / (Argentina) Mariano Hood (semifinals)

== Draw ==
=== Key ===
- Q = Qualifier
- WC = Wild card
- LL = Lucky loser
- Alt = Alternate
- SE = Special exempt
- PR = Protected ranking
- ITF = ITF entry
- JE = Junior exempt
- w/o = Walkover
- r = Retired
- d = Defaulted
- SR = Special ranking

=== Draw ===
First round
1	(Argentina) E Artoni (Italy) A Schneiter	6	7^{7}
WC	(Chile) Miguel Miranda (Chile) J Peralta	3	6^{3}
WC	(Chile) H Gamonal (Chile) F González	4	6^{8}
(Peru) L Horna (Argentina) E Massa	6	7^{10}
3	(Brazil) D Melo (Federal Republic of Yugoslavia) D Vemić	6	6
(United States) H Armando (Italy) S Galvani	3	2
(Argentina) F Browne (Argentina) S Prieto	6	6
WC	(Chile) F Parada (Chile) Juan Felipe Yáñez	3	4
Alt	(Brazil) R Mello (Brazil) F Saretta	6^{5}	6	6^{4}
(Spain) F López (Spain) M López	7^{7}	3	7^{7}
(Chile) J Fillol Jr. (Chile) A García	2	1
4	(Argentina) D del Río (Argentina) M Hood	6	6
(Argentina) M Rodríguez (Argentina) D Veronelli	7^{7}	6
(Argentina) I Hirigoyen (Argentina) S Roitman	6^{3}	4
(Brazil) A Prieto (Argentina) M Vassallo Argüello	1	3
2	(Brazil) A Sá (Brazil) A Simoni	6	6

Quarterfinals
1	(Argentina) E Artoni (Italy) A Schneiter	7^{7}	6^{5}	2
(Peru) L Horna (Argentina) E Massa	6^{5}	7^{7}	6
3	(Brazil) D Melo (Federal Republic of Yugoslavia) D Vemić	6	6
(Argentina) F Browne (Argentina) S Prieto	2	4
(Spain) F López (Spain) M López	6^{5}	5
4	(Argentina) D del Río (Argentina) M Hood	7^{7}	7
(Argentina) M Rodríguez (Argentina) D Veronelli
2	(Brazil) A Sá (Brazil) A Simoni	w/o

Semifinals
(Peru) L Horna (Argentina) E Massa	3	4
3	(Brazil) D Melo (Federal Republic of Yugoslavia) D Vemić	6	6
4	(Argentina) D del Río (Argentina) M Hood	6^{2}	4
2	(Brazil) A Sá (Brazil) A Simoni	7^{7}	6

Final
3	(Brazil) D Melo (Federal Republic of Yugoslavia) D Vemić	6	3	6^{3}
2	(Brazil) A Sá (Brazil) A Simoni	3	6	7^{7}
