= 2002 French Open – Men's singles qualifying =

Men's singles qualifying
- 2002 French Open

Events
| Singles | men | women | | boys | girls |
| Doubles | men | women | mixed | boys | girls |
| WC Singles | men | women | quad |
| WC Doubles | men | women | quad |
| Legends | −45 | 45+ | women |

Qualification
| Singles | men | women |
- French Open

This article displays the qualifying draw for the Men's Singles at the 2002 French Open.

== Seeds ==
1. (United States) Taylor Dent (first round)
2. (South Africa) Neville Godwin (first round)
3. (Brazil) Alexandre Simoni (first round)
4. (Peru) Luis Horna (first round)
5. (Sweden) Magnus Larsson (second round)
6. (Denmark) Kenneth Carlsen (first round)
7. (United States) Alex Kim (second round)
8. (Russia) Andrei Stoliarov (qualifying competition, lucky loser)
9. (Italy) Stefano Galvani (qualifying competition, lucky loser)
10. (Spain) Feliciano López (qualifying competition, lucky loser)
11. (Argentina) Edgardo Massa (qualified)
12. (Germany) Michael Kohlmann (qualifying competition)
13. (Switzerland) Marc Rosset (first round)
14. (Japan) Takao Suzuki (qualifying competition)
15. (Germany) Björn Phau (second round)
16. (Spain) Marc López (first round)
17. (Costa Rica) Juan Antonio Marín (second round)
18. (Germany) Oliver Gross (second round)
19. (Netherlands) Dennis van Scheppingen (first round)
20. (United States) Jeff Morrison (second round)
21. (Czech Republic) Ota Fukárek (first round)
22. (Netherlands) Martin Verkerk (qualifying competition)
23. (Germany) Alexander Popp (qualified)
24. (Germany) Axel Pretzsch (second round)
25. (United States) Robby Ginepri (qualified)
26. (Brazil) Ricardo Mello (second round)
27. (Russia) Yuri Schukin (qualifying competition)
28. (Croatia) Željko Krajan (first round)
29. (Italy) Renzo Furlan (second round)
30. (Argentina) Martín Vassallo Argüello (qualified)
31. (Switzerland) George Bastl (second round)
32. (Belgium) Dick Norman (second round)

== Qualifiers ==
1. (Uzbekistan) Oleg Ogorodov
2. (Germany) Alexander Popp
3. (Germany) Jens Knippschild
4. (Peru) Iván Miranda
5. (Italy) Giorgio Galimberti
6. (France) Éric Prodon
7. (Argentina) Mariano Puerta
8. (Argentina) Martín Vassallo Argüello
9. (France) Julien Varlet
10. (Spain) Didac Pérez
11. (Argentina) Edgardo Massa
12. (Germany) Tomas Behrend
13. (United States) Robby Ginepri
14. (Israel) Amir Hadad
15. (Austria) Oliver Marach
16. (United States) Jack Brasington

== Lucky losers ==
1. (Russia) Andrei Stoliarov
2. (Italy) Stefano Galvani
3. (Spain) Feliciano López

== Qualifying draw ==
Key

- Q = Qualifier
- WC = Wild card
- LL = Lucky loser
- Alt = Alternate
- ITF = ITF entry
- PR = Protected ranking
- SR = Special ranking
- SE = Special exempt
- JE = Junior exempt
- JR = Junior Accelerator Programme entrant
- CO = College Accelerator Programme entrant
- NG = Next Gen Accelerator Program entrant
- w/o = Walkover
- r = Retired
- d = Defaulted

=== First qualifier ===
First round
1 | (United States) Taylor Dent | 5 | 6^{2}
(Spain) Salvador Navarro | 7 | 7^{7}
(Norway) Jan Frode Andersen | 6 | 5 | 3
(Uzbekistan) Oleg Ogorodov | 4 | 7 | 6
(United Kingdom) Barry Cowan | 2 | 1
(Netherlands) Edwin Kempes | 6 | 6
(Netherlands) Jan Siemerink | 6 | 7^{8}
19 | (Netherlands) Dennis van Scheppingen | 2 | 6^{6}

Second round
(Spain) Salvador Navarro | 3 | 2
(Uzbekistan) Oleg Ogorodov | 6 | 6
(Netherlands) Edwin Kempes | 4 | 2
(Netherlands) Jan Siemerink | 6 | 6

Qualifying competition
(Uzbekistan) Oleg Ogorodov | 6 | 7
(Netherlands) Jan Siemerink | 3 | 5

=== Second qualifier ===
First round
2 | (South Africa) Neville Godwin | 4 | 2
(Romania) Gabriel Trifu | 6 | 6
(Australia) Peter Luczak | 7^{7} | 3 | 6
(Switzerland) Marco Chiudinelli | 6^{2} | 6 | 4
(Germany) Alexander Waske | 7^{7} | 4 | 6
(Uzbekistan) Vadim Kutsenko | 6^{4} | 6 | 3
(Brazil) Marcos Daniel | 2 | 6 | 4
23 | (Germany) Alexander Popp | 6 | 3 | 6

Second round
(Romania) Gabriel Trifu | 6^{2} | 6 | 6
(Australia) Peter Luczak | 7^{7} | 4 | 4
(Germany) Alexander Waske | 4 | 6^{1}
23 | (Germany) Alexander Popp | 6 | 7^{7}

Qualifying competition
(Romania) Gabriel Trifu | 6 | 2 | 2
23 | (Germany) Alexander Popp | 3 | 6 | 6

=== Third qualifier ===
First round
3 | (Brazil) Alexandre Simoni | 3 | 3
(Germany) Jens Knippschild | 6 | 6
(United States) Eric Taino | 3 | 1
(Netherlands) John Van Lottum | 6 | 6
WC | (France) Benjamin Cassaigne | 6 | 6^{5} | 3
(Spain) Rubén Ramírez Hidalgo | 3 | 7^{7} | 6
(Italy) Gianluca Pozzi | 3 | 6 | 1
26 | (Brazil) Ricardo Mello | 6 | 3 | 6

Second round
(Germany) Jens Knippschild | 7^{7} | 3 | 6
(Netherlands) John Van Lottum | 6^{5} | 6 | 3
(Spain) Rubén Ramírez Hidalgo | 6 | 4 | 6
26 | (Brazil) Ricardo Mello | 2 | 6 | 0

Qualifying competition
(Germany) Jens Knippschild | 6 | 7^{7}
(Spain) Rubén Ramírez Hidalgo | 4 | 6^{5}

=== Fourth qualifier ===
First round
4 | (Peru) Luis Horna | 3 | 0^{r}
(Peru) Iván Miranda | 6 | 2
(Belgium) Gilles Elseneer | 4 | 6^{3}
(France) Grégory Carraz | 6 | 7^{7}
(United States) Jeff Salzenstein | 5 | 7^{9} | 6
(Zimbabwe) Wayne Black | 7 | 6^{7} | 4
(Croatia) Ivo Karlović | 6^{5} | 4
18 | (Germany) Oliver Gross | 7^{7} | 6

Second round
(Peru) Iván Miranda | 6 | 4 | 6
(France) Grégory Carraz | 4 | 6 | 3
(United States) Jeff Salzenstein | 6 | 7
18 | (Germany) Oliver Gross | 4 | 5

Qualifying competition
(Peru) Iván Miranda | 3 | 6 | 6
(United States) Jeff Salzenstein | 6 | 3 | 4

=== Fifth qualifier ===
First round
5 | (Sweden) Magnus Larsson | 6 | 6
(France) Nicolas Thomann | 4 | 4
(United States) Kevin Kim | 3 | 6 | 6
WC | (France) Florent Serra | 6 | 3 | 4
(United States) Brian Vahaly | 1 | 6 | 3
(Czech Republic) Jan Hernych | 6 | 3 | 6
(Italy) Giorgio Galimberti | 2 | 7 | 13
21 | (Czech Republic) Ota Fukárek | 6 | 5 | 11

Second round
5 | (Sweden) Magnus Larsson | 3 | 4
(United States) Kevin Kim | 6 | 6
(Czech Republic) Jan Hernych | 4 | 6^{5}
(Italy) Giorgio Galimberti | 6 | 7^{7}

Qualifying competition
(United States) Kevin Kim | 4 | 1
(Italy) Giorgio Galimberti | 6 | 6

=== Sixth qualifier ===
First round
6 | (Denmark) Kenneth Carlsen | 2 | 6 | 4
(Germany) Christian Vinck | 6 | 2 | 6
WC | (France) Éric Prodon | 6 | 6
(Romania) Victor Hănescu | 4 | 4
(Algeria) Slimane Saoudi | 1 | 6 | 6
(Australia) Todd Larkham | 6 | 4 | 4
(Spain) Iván Navarro | 0 | 4
22 | (Netherlands) Martin Verkerk | 6 | 6

Second round
(Germany) Christian Vinck | 4 | 1
WC | (France) Éric Prodon | 6 | 6
(Algeria) Slimane Saoudi | 7^{9} | 6^{1} | 4
22 | (Netherlands) Martin Verkerk | 6^{7} | 7^{7} | 6

Qualifying competition
WC | (France) Éric Prodon | 5 | 6 | 6
22 | (Netherlands) Martin Verkerk | 7 | 3 | 3

=== Seventh qualifier ===
First round
7 | (United States) Alex Kim | 6 | 6
(Australia) Jaymon Crabb | 2 | 2
(Argentina) Mariano Puerta | 6 | 6
PR | (Romania) Răzvan Sabău | 3 | 3
(Sweden) Björn Rehnquist | 7 | 0 | 1
(Spain) Germán Puentes-Alcaniz | 5 | 6 | 6
(Russia) Artem Derepasko | 6 | 2 | 3
24 | (Germany) Axel Pretzsch | 3 | 6 | 6

Second round
7 | (United States) Alex Kim | 2 | 5
(Argentina) Mariano Puerta | 6 | 7
(Spain) Germán Puentes-Alcaniz | 4 | 7 | 6
24 | (Germany) Axel Pretzsch | 6 | 5 | 4

Qualifying competition
(Argentina) Mariano Puerta | 6 | 6
(Spain) Germán Puentes-Alcaniz | 4 | 1

=== Eighth qualifier ===
First round
8 | (Russia) Andrei Stoliarov | 6 | 6
(Germany) David Prinosil | 3 | 0
(South Africa) Louis Vosloo | 4 | 7^{7} | 6
(Thailand) Danai Udomchoke | 6 | 6^{5} | 3
(United Kingdom) Arvind Parmar | 4 | 3
(Germany) Markus Hantschk | 6 | 6
WC | (France) Jean-Christophe Faurel | 4 | 2
30 | (Argentina) Martín Vassallo Argüello | 6 | 6

Second round
8 | (Russia) Andrei Stoliarov | 6 | 6
(South Africa) Louis Vosloo | 2 | 3
(Germany) Markus Hantschk | 5 | 1
30 | (Argentina) Martín Vassallo Argüello | 7 | 6

Qualifying competition
8 | (Russia) Andrei Stoliarov | 6 | 4 | 2
30 | (Argentina) Martín Vassallo Argüello | 4 | 6 | 6

=== Ninth qualifier ===
First round
9 | (Italy) Stefano Galvani | 4 | 6 | 6
(Germany) Jakub Záhlava | 6 | 1 | 4
(Spain) Gorka Fraile | 6^{3} | 7^{7} | 4
WC | (France) Thierry Ascione | 7^{7} | 6^{1} | 6
(Russia) Igor Kunitsyn | 4 | 1
(France) Julien Varlet | 6 | 6
(United Kingdom) Jamie Delgado | 3 | 3
20 | (United States) Jeff Morrison | 6 | 6

Second round
9 | (Italy) Stefano Galvani | 6 | 6
WC | (France) Thierry Ascione | 2 | 4
(France) Julien Varlet | 6 | 6
20 | (United States) Jeff Morrison | 3 | 4

Qualifying competition
9 | (Italy) Stefano Galvani | 4 | 6 | 0
(France) Julien Varlet | 6 | 4 | 6

=== Tenth qualifier ===
First round
10 | (Spain) Feliciano López | 7^{8} | 6
(France) Jean-François Bachelot | 6^{6} | 3
(South Africa) Justin Bower | 6^{4} | 2
(Argentina) Cristian Kordasz | 7^{7} | 6
(Spain) Didac Pérez | 6 | 6
(Brazil) Júlio Silva | 4 | 3
WC | (France) Marc Gicquel | 6 | 6^{7} | 7
32 | (Belgium) Dick Norman | 4 | 7^{9} | 9

Second round
10 | (Spain) Feliciano López | 6 | 3 | 6
(Argentina) Cristian Kordasz | 3 | 6 | 3
(Spain) Didac Pérez | 6 | 6
32 | (Belgium) Dick Norman | 3 | 1

Qualifying competition
10 | (Spain) Feliciano López | 7^{7} | 4 | 5
(Spain) Didac Pérez | 6^{3} | 6 | 7

=== Eleventh qualifier ===
First round
11 | (Argentina) Edgardo Massa | 6 | 6
(France) Olivier Patience | 3 | 3
(Czech Republic) Petr Dezort | 7^{7} | 7
(Brazil) Francisco Costa | 6^{3} | 5
(Austria) Werner Eschauer | 1 | 6 | 6
WC | (France) Jean-Baptiste Perlant | 6 | 2 | 4
(Israel) Noam Behr | 3 | 5
31 | (Switzerland) George Bastl | 6 | 7

Second round
11 | (Argentina) Edgardo Massa | 6 | 6
(Czech Republic) Petr Dezort | 1 | 1
(Austria) Werner Eschauer | 6 | 6
31 | (Switzerland) George Bastl | 4 | 1

Qualifying competition
11 | (Argentina) Edgardo Massa | 6 | 6
(Austria) Werner Eschauer | 2 | 2

=== Twelfth qualifier ===
First round
12 | (Germany) Michael Kohlmann | 6^{7} | 6 | 7
(Canada) Frédéric Niemeyer | 7^{9} | 3 | 5
(Spain) Óscar Serrano | 4 | 6 | 6
(United States) Robert Kendrick | 6 | 3 | 1
(United States) Mardy Fish | 3 | 6^{4}
(Germany) Tomas Behrend | 6 | 7^{7}
(Croatia) Mario Radić | 2 | 4
17 | (Costa Rica) Juan Antonio Marín | 6 | 6

Second round
12 | (Germany) Michael Kohlmann | 6 | 7
(Spain) Óscar Serrano | 4 | 5
(Germany) Tomas Behrend | 6 | 6
17 | (Costa Rica) Juan Antonio Marín | 2 | 3

Qualifying competition
12 | (Germany) Michael Kohlmann | 2 | 6 | 7
(Germany) Tomas Behrend | 6 | 4 | 9

=== Thirteenth qualifier ===
First round
13 | (Switzerland) Marc Rosset | 6 | 4 | 3
(Morocco) Karim Alami | 3 | 6 | 6
(Italy) Filippo Volandri | 6 | 6^{5} | 7
(Croatia) Mario Ančić | 2 | 7^{7} | 5
(Greece) Vasilis Mazarakis | 6 | 6
(France) Cyril Saulnier | 1 | 0
(Belarus) Vladimir Voltchkov | 3 | 4
25 | (United States) Robby Ginepri | 6 | 6

Second round
(Morocco) Karim Alami | 6 | 4
(Italy) Filippo Volandri | 4 | 1^{r}
(Greece) Vasilis Mazarakis | 5 | 3
25 | (United States) Robby Ginepri | 7 | 6

Qualifying competition
(Morocco) Karim Alami | 6^{5} | 1
25 | (United States) Robby Ginepri | 7^{7} | 6

=== Fourteenth qualifier ===
First round
14 | (Japan) Takao Suzuki | 6 | 7^{7}
(Brazil) Daniel Melo | 4 | 6^{5}
(Austria) Alexander Peya | 6 | 4 | 3
(Spain) David Ferrer | 3 | 6 | 6
(Spain) Óscar Hernández | 6 | 3 | 2
(Italy) Alessio di Mauro | 3 | 6 | 6
(Israel) Amir Hadad | 6 | 7
28 | (Croatia) Željko Krajan | 1 | 5

Second round
14 | (Japan) Takao Suzuki | 6 | 6
(Spain) David Ferrer | 3 | 4
(Italy) Alessio di Mauro | 1 | 6 | 3
(Israel) Amir Hadad | 6 | 3 | 6

Qualifying competition
14 | (Japan) Takao Suzuki | 5 | 3
(Israel) Amir Hadad | 7 | 6

=== Fifteenth qualifier ===
First round
15 | (Germany) Björn Phau | 5 | 6 | 6
(France) Nicolas Mahut | 7 | 4 | 3
(Slovakia) Ladislav Švarc | 2 | 6 | 4
(Austria) Oliver Marach | 6 | 3 | 6
(Russia) Denis Golovanov | 3 | 6 | 6
(Italy) Cristiano Caratti | 6 | 2 | 3
(France) Thomas Dupré | 4 | 3
27 | (Russia) Yuri Schukin | 6 | 6

Second round
15 | (Germany) Björn Phau | 6 | 3 | 4
(Austria) Oliver Marach | 3 | 6 | 6
(Russia) Denis Golovanov | 3 | 1
27 | (Russia) Yuri Schukin | 6 | 6

Qualifying competition
(Austria) Oliver Marach | 3 | 6 | 7
27 | (Russia) Yuri Schukin | 6 | 4 | 5

=== Sixteenth qualifier ===
First round
16 | (Spain) Marc López | 6 | 4 | 3
(Argentina) Leonardo Olguín | 3 | 6 | 6
WC | (France) Olivier Mutis | 6 | 6^{4} | 9
PR | (Czech Republic) Petr Kralert | 2 | 7^{7} | 7
(United States) Jack Brasington | 6 | 6
WC | (France) Jérôme Haehnel | 3 | 4
(Czech Republic) Radek Štěpánek | 1 | 6 | 1
29 | (Italy) Renzo Furlan | 6 | 4 | 6

Second round
(Argentina) Leonardo Olguín | 6 | 6
WC | (France) Olivier Mutis | 4 | 4
(United States) Jack Brasington | 6 | 6
29 | (Italy) Renzo Furlan | 3 | 4

Qualifying competition
(Argentina) Leonardo Olguín | 1 | 3
(United States) Jack Brasington | 6 | 6
