= 2001 Brasil Open – Men's doubles =

Men's doubles
- 2001 Brasil Open

Final
- Champions: (Argentina) Enzo Artoni; (Brazil) Daniel Melo
- Runners-up: (Argentina) Gastón Etlis; (South Africa) Brent Haygarth
- Score: 6–3, 1–6, 7–6^{(7–5)}

Details
- Draw: 16
- Seeds: 4

Events
Singles	men	women
Doubles	men	women
← 2000 ·	Brasil Open	· 2002 →

Enzo Artoni and Daniel Melo won in the final 6–3, 1–6, 7–6^{(7–5)} against Gastón Etlis and Brent Haygarth.

== Seeds ==
1. (Argentina) Lucas Arnold / (Brazil) Jaime Oncins (first round)
2. (Argentina) Gastón Etlis / (South Africa) Brent Haygarth (final)
3. (Argentina) Guillermo Cañas / (Argentina) Martín García (quarterfinals)
4. (Australia) Tim Crichton / (South Africa) Jason Weir-Smith (first round)

== Draw ==
=== Key ===
- Q = Qualifier
- WC = Wild card
- LL = Lucky loser
- Alt = Alternate
- ITF = ITF entry
- PR = Protected ranking
- SR = Special ranking
- SE = Special exempt
- JE = Junior exempt
- JR = Junior Accelerator Programme entrant
- CO = College Accelerator Programme entrant
- NG = Next Gen Accelerator Program entrant
- w/o = Walkover
- r = Retired
- d = Defaulted

First round

Quarterfinals

Semifinals

Final

1
- (Argentina) L Arnold
- (Brazil) J Oncins
3
4

- (Argentina) E Artoni
- (Brazil) D Melo
6
6

- (Argentina) E Artoni
- (Brazil) D Melo
6
6

- (Switzerland) I Heuberger
- (Australia) D Petrovic
6
2
6^{3}

WC
- (Brazil) F Meligeni
- (Brazil) F Saretta
3
2

WC
- (Brazil) F Meligeni
- (Brazil) F Saretta
4
6
7^{7}

- (Argentina) E Artoni
- (Brazil) D Melo
1
6
6

4
- (Australia) T Crichton
- (South Africa) J Weir-Smith
4
4

- (United States) D Bowen
- (Australia) A Fisher
6
4
4

- (United States) D Bowen
- (Australia) A Fisher
6
6

- (United States) D Bowen
- (Australia) A Fisher
6
6^{1}
7^{7}

WC
- (Brazil) A Ferreira
- (Brazil) A Prieto
4
4

- (Brazil) A Sá
- (Brazil) A Simoni
4
7^{7}
6^{4}

- (Brazil) A Sá
- (Brazil) A Simoni
6
6

- (Argentina) E Artoni
- (Brazil) D Melo
6
1
7^{7}

- (Argentina) I Hirigoyen
- (Belarus) V Voltchkov
4
2

2
- (Argentina) G Etlis
- (South Africa) B Haygarth
3
6
6^{5}

- (South Africa) N Godwin
- (The Bahamas) M Merklein
6
6

- (South Africa) N Godwin
- (The Bahamas) M Merklein
6^{8}
6
6

- (Argentina) G Marcaccio
- (South Africa) S Rudman
5
6^{7}

3
- (Argentina) G Cañas
- (Argentina) M García
7^{10}
3
4

3
- (Argentina) G Cañas
- (Argentina) M García
7
7^{9}

- (South Africa) N Godwin
- (The Bahamas) M Merklein
6
3
4

- (Australia) S Huss
- (Australia) L Pearson
6^{5}
1

2
- (Argentina) G Etlis
- (South Africa) B Haygarth
3
6
6

WC
- (Brazil) M Daniel
- (Brazil) R Mello
7^{7}
6

WC
- (Brazil) M Daniel
- (Brazil) R Mello
6^{4}
4

WC
- (Brazil) M Carlsson
- (Brazil) R Schlachter
3
0

2
- (Argentina) G Etlis
- (South Africa) B Haygarth
7^{7}
6

2
- (Argentina) G Etlis
- (South Africa) B Haygarth
6
6
