= 2001 Brasil Open – Men's singles =

Men's singles
- 2001 Brasil Open

Final
- Champion: (Czech Republic) Jan Vacek
- Runner-up: (Brazil) Fernando Meligeni
- Score: 2–6, 7–6^{(7–2)}, 6–3

Details
- Draw: 32
- Seeds: 8

Events
Singles	men	women
Doubles	men	women
- Brasil Open

Jan Vacek won in the final 2–6, 7–6^{(7–2)}, 6–3 against Fernando Meligeni.

== Seeds ==
1. (Brazil) Gustavo Kuerten (first round)
2. (Argentina) Guillermo Cañas (quarterfinals)
3. (Belarus) Vladimir Voltchkov (first round)
4. (Chile) Nicolás Massú (second round)
5. (Brazil) Fernando Meligeni (final)
6. (Brazil) Alexandre Simoni (semifinals)
7. (Argentina) Agustín Calleri (semifinals)
8. (Argentina) Mariano Zabaleta (second round)

== Draw ==
Key

- Q = Qualifier
- WC = Wild card
- LL = Lucky loser
- Alt = Alternate
- ITF = ITF entry
- PR = Protected ranking
- SR = Special ranking
- SE = Special exempt
- JE = Junior exempt
- JR = Junior Accelerator Programme entrant
- CO = College Accelerator Programme entrant
- NG = Next Gen Accelerator Program entrant
- w/o = Walkover
- r = Retired
- d = Defaulted

=== Finals ===
Semifinals
(Czech Republic) Jan Vacek	7^{7}	6
6	(Brazil) Alexandre Simoni	6^{5}	2
5	(Brazil) Fernando Meligeni	7^{7}	7
7	(Argentina) Agustín Calleri	6^{5}	5

Final
(Czech Republic) Jan Vacek	2	7^{7}	6
5	(Brazil) Fernando Meligeni	6	6^{2}	3

=== Top half ===
First round
1	(Brazil) G Kuerten	6	2	4
WC	(Brazil) F Saretta	4	6	6
(United Kingdom) J Delgado	3	5
(Germany) M Hantschk	6	7
(Czech Republic) J Vacek	2	7^{7}	6
WC	(Brazil) J Oncins	6	6^{2}	2
(France) C Saulnier	7^{8}	6^{5}	6^{4}
8	(Argentina) M Zabaleta	6^{6}	7^{7}	7^{7}
4	(Chile) N Massú	6	2	6
LL	(Argentina) I Hirigoyen	2	6	2
(Brazil) A Sá	1	6	2
Q	(Brazil) R Mello	6	1	6
(Morocco) K Alami	4	3
Q	(Chile) F González	6	6
(Russia) N Davydenko	3	6	3
6	(Brazil) A Simoni	6	4	6

Second round
WC	(Brazil) F Saretta	6	6
(Germany) M Hantschk	4	1
(Czech Republic) J Vacek	3	6	7^{8}
8	(Argentina) M Zabaleta	6	4	6^{6}
4	(Chile) N Massú	6	6^{4}	3
Q	(Brazil) R Mello	1	7^{7}	6
Q	(Chile) F González	0	3
6	(Brazil) A Simoni	6	6

Quarterfinals
WC	(Brazil) F Saretta	6	3	2
(Czech Republic) J Vacek	1	6	6
Q	(Brazil) R Mello	4	3
6	(Brazil) A Simoni	6	6

Semifinals
(Czech Republic) J Vacek	7^{7}	6
6	(Brazil) A Simoni	6^{5}	2

=== Bottom half ===
First round
5	(Brazil) F Meligeni	6	6
Q	(Brazil) F Costa	1	2
(Argentina) F Browne	6	6
(South Africa) N Godwin	2	3
(Germany) A Pretzsch	6^{3}	4
(United States) C Mamiit	7^{7}	6
(Paraguay) R Delgado	7	7
3	(Belarus) V Voltchkov	5	5
7	(Argentina) A Calleri	6	7^{7}
(Peru) L Horna	0	6^{4}
Q	(United States) M Washington	5	4
(Switzerland) I Heuberger	7	6
(United Kingdom) M Lee	6	6
(France) N Thomann	4	2
WC	(Brazil) T Alves	3	4
2	(Argentina) G Cañas	6	6

Second round
5	(Brazil) F Meligeni	7	6
(Argentina) F Browne	5	4
(United States) C Mamiit	2	4
(Paraguay) R Delgado	6	6
7	(Argentina) A Calleri	6	7
(Switzerland) I Heuberger	3	5
(United Kingdom) M Lee	2	2
2	(Argentina) G Cañas	6	6

Quarterfinals
5	(Brazil) F Meligeni	6	6
(Paraguay) R Delgado	1	4
7	(Argentina) A Calleri	7^{7}	6
2	(Argentina) G Cañas	6^{5}	4

Semifinals
5	(Brazil) F Meligeni	7^{7}	7
7	(Argentina) A Calleri	6^{5}	5
