= 2002 Open SEAT Godó – Doubles =

Doubles
- 2002 Open SEAT Godó
- 2001 Champions: (United States) Donald Johnson (United States) Jared Palmer

Final
- Champions: (Australia) Michael Hill (Czech Republic) Daniel Vacek
- Runners-up: (Argentina) Lucas Arnold (Argentina) Gastón Etlis
- Score: 6–4, 6–4

Details
- Draw: 28
- Seeds: 8

Events
Singles	Doubles
- Open SEAT Godó

Donald Johnson and Jared Palmer were the defending champions but lost in the second round to Guillermo Cañas and David Nalbandian.

Michael Hill and Daniel Vacek won in the final 6–4, 6–4 against Lucas Arnold and Gastón Etlis.

== Seeds ==
Champion seeds are indicated in bold text while text in italics indicates the round in which those seeds were eliminated. The top four seeded teams received byes into the second round.

1. (United States) Donald Johnson / (United States) Jared Palmer (second round)
2. (India) Mahesh Bhupathi / (Australia) Todd Woodbridge (second round)
3. (Australia) Joshua Eagle / (Australia) Sandon Stolle (second round)
4. (Czech Republic) Petr Pála / (Czech Republic) Pavel Vízner (quarterfinals)
5. (Czech Republic) Martin Damm / (Czech Republic) Cyril Suk (semifinals)
6. (Australia) Andrew Florent / (United States) Brian MacPhie (first round)
7. (Argentina) Lucas Arnold / (Argentina) Gastón Etlis (final)
8. (South Africa) David Adams / (Sweden) Simon Aspelin (first round)

== Draw ==
Key

- Q = Qualifier
- WC = Wild card
- LL = Lucky loser
- Alt = Alternate
- ITF = ITF entry
- PR = Protected ranking
- SR = Special ranking
- SE = Special exempt
- JE = Junior exempt
- JR = Junior Accelerator Programme entrant
- CO = College Accelerator Programme entrant
- NG = Next Gen Accelerator Program entrant
- w/o = Walkover
- r = Retired
- d = Defaulted

=== Final ===
Final

7
- (Argentina) Lucas Arnold
- (Argentina) Gastón Etlis
4
4

- (Australia) **Michael Hill**
- (Czech Republic) **Daniel Vacek**
**6**
**6**

=== Top half ===
First round

Second round

Quarterfinals

Semifinals

1
- (United States) D Johnson
- (United States) J Palmer
**6**
2
[4]

- (France) N Escudé
- (France) M Llodra

- (Argentina) **G Cañas**
- (Argentina) **D Nalbandian**
2
**6**
**[10]**

- (Argentina) **G Cañas**
- (Argentina) **D Nalbandian**
**w/o**

- (Argentina) G Cañas
- (Argentina) D Nalbandian
6^{7}
**7^{7}**
[10]

- (South Africa) **C Haggard**
- (Belgium) **T Vanhoudt**
**6**
2
**[10]**

5
- (Czech Republic) **M Damm**
- (Czech Republic) **C Suk**
**7^{9}**
6^{4}
**[12]**

WC
- (Australia) N Healey
- (Australia) L Hewitt
3
**6**
[6]

- (South Africa) C Haggard
- (Belgium) T Vanhoudt
2
3

- (Germany) K Braasch
- (Russia) A Olhovskiy
6^{5}
2

5
- (Czech Republic) **M Damm**
- (Czech Republic) **C Suk**
**6**
**6**

5
- (Czech Republic) **M Damm**
- (Czech Republic) **C Suk**
**7^{7}**
**6**

5
- (Czech Republic) M Damm
- (Czech Republic) C Suk
5
2

7
- (Argentina) **L Arnold**
- (Argentina) **G Etlis**
**7**
**6**

4
- (Czech Republic) **P Pála**
- (Czech Republic) **P Vízner**
**6**
**6**

- (Sweden) P Nyborg
- (Brazil) A Sá
5
4

- (Italy) E Artoni
- (Brazil) D Melo
4
3

- (Italy) **E Artoni**
- (Brazil) **D Melo**
**7**
**6**

4
- (Czech Republic) P Pála
- (Czech Republic) P Vízner
2
**6**
[7]

- (Czech Republic) T Cibulec
- (Czech Republic) P Luxa
4
4

7
- (Argentina) **L Arnold**
- (Argentina) **G Etlis**
**6**
3
**[10]**

WC
- (Spain) **J Balcells**
- (Spain) **F Vicente**
**6**
**6**

WC
- (Spain) J Balcells
- (Spain) F Vicente
6^{4}
3

- (Spain) À Corretja
- (Spain) À Costa
6^{7}
3

7
- (Argentina) **L Arnold**
- (Argentina) **G Etlis**
**7^{7}**
**6**

7
- (Argentina) **L Arnold**
- (Argentina) **G Etlis**
**7^{9}**
**6**

=== Bottom half ===
First round

Second round

Quarterfinals

Semifinals

8
- (South Africa) D Adams
- (Sweden) S Aspelin
3
**6**
[10]

- (North Macedonia) **A Kitinov**
- (Sweden) **J Landsberg**
**6**
2
**[12]**

- (North Macedonia) A Kitinov
- (Sweden) J Landsberg
**6**
4
[3]

- (Zimbabwe) **B Black**
- (South Africa) **R Koenig**
**6**
**6**

- (Zimbabwe) **B Black**
- (South Africa) **R Koenig**
3
**6**
**[10]**

- (Czech Republic) L Friedl
- (Japan) T Shimada
2
4

- (Zimbabwe) B Black
- (South Africa) R Koenig
3
6^{5}

- (Australia) **M Hill**
- (Czech Republic) **D Vacek**
**7**
**6**

- (Australia) **M Hill**
- (Czech Republic) **D Vacek**
**6**
**7^{7}**

- (Ecuador) N Lapentti
- (United States) J Tarango
5
2

- (Australia) **M Hill**
- (Czech Republic) **D Vacek**
**7^{11}**
2
**[10]**

3
- (Australia) J Eagle
- (Australia) S Stolle
6^{9}
**6**
[8]

- (Australia) **M Hill**
- (Czech Republic) **D Vacek**
**6**
**7^{7}**

6
- (Australia) A Florent
- (United States) B MacPhie
**6**
3
[6]

- (Morocco) Y El Aynaoui
- (Spain) A Portas
3
6^{2}

- (Argentina) **D Orsanic**
- (Argentina) **M Rodríguez**
3
**6**
**[10]**

- (Argentina) D Orsanic
- (Argentina) M Rodríguez
2
0

WC
- (Spain) G Blanco
- (Spain) F López
1
6^{4}

- (South Africa) **M Barnard**
- (United States) **J Thomas**
**6**
**6**

- (South Africa) **M Barnard**
- (United States) **J Thomas**
**6**
**7^{7}**

- (South Africa) M Barnard
- (United States) J Thomas
6^{9}
2

- (Spain) J C Ferrero
- (Spain) T Robredo
5
**6**
[10]

- (Morocco) **Y El Aynaoui**
- (Spain) **A Portas**
**7^{11}**
**6**

- (Morocco) **Y El Aynaoui**
- (Spain) **A Portas**
**7**
3
**[12]**

- (Morocco) **Y El Aynaoui**
- (Spain) **A Portas**
3
**6**
**[10]**

2
- (India) M Bhupathi
- (Australia) T Woodbridge
**6**
4
[3]
