= 2002 Open SEAT Godó – Singles =

Singles
- 2002 Open SEAT Godó
- 2001 Champion: (Spain) Juan Carlos Ferrero

Final
- Champion: (Argentina) Gastón Gaudio
- Runner-up: (Spain) Albert Costa
- Score: 6–4, 6–0, 6–2

Details
- Draw: 56
- Seeds: 16

Events
Singles	Doubles
- Open SEAT Godó

Juan Carlos Ferrero was the defending champion but lost in the third round to Alberto Martín.

Gastón Gaudio won in the final 6–4, 6–0, 6–2 against Albert Costa.

== Seeds ==
A champion seed is indicated in bold text while text in italics indicates the round in which that seed was eliminated. The top eight seeds received a bye to the second round.

1. (Australia) Lleyton Hewitt (semifinals)
2. (Russia) Yevgeny Kafelnikov (second round)
3. (Spain) Juan Carlos Ferrero (third round)
4. (France) Sébastien Grosjean (second round)
5. (Argentina) Guillermo Cañas (semifinals)
6. (Morocco) Younes El Aynaoui (quarterfinals)
7. (Spain) Àlex Corretja (quarterfinals)
8. (Sweden) Thomas Enqvist (second round)
9. (Ecuador) Nicolás Lapentti (third round)
10. (Morocco) Hicham Arazi (first round)
11. n/a
12. (Spain) Carlos Moyá (third round)
13. (Spain) Albert Portas (first round)
14. (Argentina) Juan Ignacio Chela (second round)
15. (Spain) Albert Costa (final)
16. (Argentina) David Nalbandian (third round)

== Draw ==
Key

- Q = Qualifier
- WC = Wild card
- LL = Lucky loser
- Alt = Alternate
- ITF = ITF entry
- PR = Protected ranking
- SR = Special ranking
- SE = Special exempt
- JE = Junior exempt
- JR = Junior Accelerator Programme entrant
- CO = College Accelerator Programme entrant
- NG = Next Gen Accelerator Program entrant
- w/o = Walkover
- r = Retired
- d = Defaulted

=== Finals ===
Semifinals
1	(Australia) Lleyton Hewitt	4	5
(Argentina) **Gastón Gaudio**	**6**	**7**
5	(Argentina) Guillermo Cañas	2	**6**	3
15	(Spain) **Albert Costa**	**6**	2	**6**

Final
(Argentina) **Gastón Gaudio**	**6**	**6**	**6**
15	(Spain) Albert Costa	4	0	2

=== Top half ===
==== Section 1 ====
First round
WC	(Spain) **M López**	2	**6**	**7**
(Spain) T Robredo	**6**	3	5
Q	(Georgia (country)) **I Labadze**	**7**	**6**
(France) A Dupuis	5	4
(Romania) A Voinea	1	2
16	(Argentina) **D Nalbandian**	**6**	**6**
10	(Morocco) H Arazi	**6**	4	4
Q	(Croatia) **Ž Krajan**	2	**6**	**6**
(Argentina) M Zabaleta	4	6^{10}
(Spain) **D Sánchez**	**6**	**7^{12}**
(Belgium) C Rochus	1	2
(Argentina) **A Calleri**	**6**	**6**

Second round
1	(Australia) **L Hewitt**	**7^{8}**	**6**
WC	(Spain) M López	6^{6}	2
Q	(Georgia (country)) I Labadze	5	5
16	(Argentina) **D Nalbandian**	**7**	**7**
Q	(Croatia) Ž Krajan	2	5
(Spain) **D Sánchez**	**6**	**7**
(Argentina) A Calleri	3	0	r
6	(Morocco) **Y El Aynaoui**	**6**	**3**

Third round
1	(Australia) **L Hewitt**	**6**	**6**
16	(Argentina) D Nalbandian	2	4
(Spain) D Sánchez	4	6^{6}
6	(Morocco) **Y El Aynaoui**	**6**	**7^{8}**

Quarterfinals
1	(Australia) **L Hewitt**	**6**	**6**
6	(Morocco) Y El Aynaoui	4	2

==== Section 2 ====
First round
WC	(Costa Rica) J A Marín	0	1
WC	(Argentina) **J Acasuso**	**6**	**6**
(Belgium) **O Rochus**	**6**	**6**
(Austria) M Hipfl	2	2
(Spain) **A Martín**	**7**	**6**
13	(Spain) A Portas	5	3
12	(Spain) **C Moyá**	**6**	**6**
LL	(Brazil) D Melo	3	3
(Italy) **A Gaudenzi**	3	**6**	**6**
Q	(France) M Llodra	**6**	3	2
(Spain) A Montañés	3	2
(Argentina) **G Gaudio**	**6**	**6**

Second round
3	(Spain) **J C Ferrero**	**6**	**6**
WC	(Argentina) J Acasuso	4	3
(Belgium) O Rochus	5	**7**	4
(Spain) **A Martín**	**7**	5	**6**
12	(Spain) **C Moyá**	**6**	**6**
(Italy) A Gaudenzi	3	3
(Argentina) **G Gaudio**	**6**	**6**
8	(Sweden) T Enqvist	4	2

Third round
3	(Spain) J C Ferrero	2	3
(Spain) **A Martín**	**6**	**6**
12	(Spain) C Moyá	4	2
(Argentina) **G Gaudio**	**6**	**6**

Quarterfinals
(Spain) A Martín	2	4
(Argentina) **G Gaudio**	**6**	**6**

=== Bottom half ===
==== Section 3 ====
First round
WC	(Spain) **S Bruguera**	4	**7^{7}**	**6**
Q	(Spain) C Cuadrado	**6**	6^{5}	1
(Thailand) P Srichaphan	3	0
(Argentina) **F Squillari**	**6**	**6**
(France) **A Clément**	**7**	**7**
LL	(France) P-H Mathieu	5	5
14	(Argentina) **J I Chela**	**6**	**6**
(Finland) J Nieminen	4	4
(Switzerland) M Kratochvil	4	**6**	2
Q	(France) **C Pioline**	**6**	4	**6**
WC	(Spain) F López	**6**	3	3
(Slovakia) **D Hrbatý**	3	**6**	**6**

Second round
5	(Argentina) **G Cañas**	5	**6**	**6**
WC	(Spain) S Bruguera	**7**	3	3
(Argentina) **F Squillari**	**6**	**6**
(France) A Clément	1	4
14	(Argentina) J I Chela	6^{4}	2
Q	(France) **C Pioline**	**7^{7}**	**6**
(Slovakia) **D Hrbatý**	**6**	**6**
4	(France) S Grosjean	3	4

Third round
5	(Argentina) **G Cañas**	**6**	**6**
(Argentina) F Squillari	2	4
Q	(France) **C Pioline**	**6**	**7^{9}**
(Slovakia) D Hrbatý	3	6^{7}

Quarterfinals
5	(Argentina) **G Cañas**	**7^{8}**	**6**
Q	(France) C Pioline	6^{6}	3

==== Section 4 ====
First round
(Spain) **G Blanco**	**6**
(Chile) N Massú	3	r
(Brazil) F Meligeni	3	6^{6}
Q	(Spain) **D Pérez**	**6**	**7^{8}**
(Austria) S Koubek	4	0
9	(Ecuador) **N Lapentti**	**6**	**6**
15	(Spain) **A Costa**	**6**	**6**
(Spain) F Vicente	2	3
(Chile) F González	5	3
(Spain) **F Mantilla**	**7**	**6**
Q	(Italy) **S Galvani**	4	**6**	**7^{7}**
(Croatia) I Ljubičić	**6**	1	6^{5}

Second round
7	(Spain) **À Corretja**	**7^{7}**	**7**
(Spain) G Blanco	6^{5}	5
Q	(Spain) D Pérez	4	**7^{9}**	5
9	(Ecuador) **N Lapentti**	**6**	6^{7}	**7**
15	(Spain) **A Costa**	**6**	5	**6**
(Spain) F Mantilla	3	**7**	4
Q	(Italy) **S Galvani**	**7^{7}**	**6**
2	(Russia) Y Kafelnikov	6^{3}	2

Third round
7	(Spain) **À Corretja**	5	**6**	**6**
9	(Ecuador) N Lapentti	**7**	3	2
15	(Spain) **A Costa**	**7**	**7^{7}**
Q	(Italy) S Galvani	5	6^{3}

Quarterfinals
7	(Spain) À Corretja	**7**	6^{6}	6^{4}
15	(Spain) **A Costa**	5	**7^{8}**	**7^{7}**
