= 2001 Brasil Open =

- Date: 10–16 September
- Edition: 1st (men) / 3rd (women)
- Surface: Hard / outdoor
- Location: Mata de São João, Brazil

Champions

Men's singles
- (Czech Republic) Jan Vacek

Women's singles
- (United States) Monica Seles

Men's doubles
- (Italy) Enzo Artoni / (Brazil) Daniel Melo

Women's doubles
- (South Africa) Amanda Coetzer / (United States) Lori McNeil
- Brasil Open

The 2001 Brasil Open was a tennis tournament played on outdoor hard courts in Costa do Sauipe resort, Mata de São João, in Brazil that was part of the International Series of the 2001 ATP Tour and of Tier II of the 2001 WTA Tour. The tournament ran from 10 September 16 September 2001.

== Finals ==
=== Men's singles ===
(Czech Republic) Jan Vacek defeated (Brazil) Fernando Meligeni 2–6, 7–6^{(7–2)}, 6–3

- It was Vacek's only title of the year and the 1st of his career.

=== Women's singles ===
(United States) Monica Seles defeated (Federal Republic of Yugoslavia) Jelena Dokić 6–3, 6–3

- It was Seles' 2nd title of the year and the 55th of her career.

=== Men's doubles ===
(Italy) Enzo Artoni / (Brazil) Daniel Melo defeated (Argentina) Gastón Etlis / (South Africa) Brent Haygarth 6–3, 1–6, 7–6^{(7–5)}

- It was Artoni's only title of the year and the 1st of his career. It was Melo's only title of the year and the 1st of his career.

=== Women's doubles ===
(South Africa) Amanda Coetzer / (United States) Lori McNeil defeated (United States) Nicole Arendt / (Argentina) Patricia Tarabini 6–7^{(8–10)}, 6–2, 6–4

- It was Coetzer's 3rd title of the year and the 17th of her career. It was McNeil's 2nd title of the year and the 43rd of her career.
