= Gastón Gaudio career statistics =

Career finals
Discipline	Type	Won	Lost	Total	WR ^{1}
Singles	Grand Slam tournaments	1	0	1	1.00
Singles	Year-end championships	–	–	–	–
Singles	ATP Masters 1000 ^{2}	–	–	–	–
Singles	Olympic Games	–	–	–	–
Singles	ATP Tour 500	2	5	7	0.29
Singles	ATP Tour 250	5	3	8	0.63
Singles	Total	8	8	16	0.50
Doubles	Grand Slam tournaments	–	–	–	–
Doubles	Year-end championships	–	–	–	–
Doubles	ATP Masters 1000 ^{2}	–	–	–	–
Doubles	Olympic Games	–	–	–	–
Doubles	ATP Tour 500	1	0	1	1.00
Doubles	ATP Tour 250	2	0	2	1.00
Doubles	Total	3	0	3	1.00
Total		11	8	19	0.58
1) WR = Winning Rate 2) Formerly known as "Super 9" (1996–1999), "Tennis Masters Series" (2000–2003) or "ATP Masters Series" (2004–2008).

This is a list of the main career statistics of Argentine professional tennis player Gastón Gaudio.

== Historic Achievements ==
By winning the 2004 French Open, Gaudio became the first Argentine to win a Grand Slam since Guillermo Vilas in 1979, and the first man ever to win a Grand Slam after losing the first set 6–0. He became the fifth-lowest-ranked player to win a Grand Slam, and the only man together with Novak Djokovic and Carlos Alcaraz to date in the open era to win a Grand Slam having saved match points in the final.

== Grand Slam finals ==
=== Singles: 1 (1 title) ===
Result	Year	Championship	Surface	Opponent	Score
Win	2004	French Open	Clay	(Argentina) Guillermo Coria	0–6, 3–6, 6–4, 6–1, 8–6

== ATP career finals ==
=== Singles: 16 (8 titles, 8 runners-up) ===
Legend Grand Slam (1–0) Tennis Masters Cup (0–0) ATP Masters Series (0–0) ATP International Series Gold (2–5) ATP International Series (5–3)	Titles by surface Hard (0–0) Clay (8–8) Grass (0–0) Carpet (0–0)

Result	W/L	Date	Tournament	Surface	Opponent	Score
Loss	0-1	Jul 2000	Stuttgart, Germany	Clay	(Argentina) Franco Squillari	6–2, 3–6, 4–6, 6–4, 6–2
Loss	0-2	Feb 2001	Viña del Mar, Chile	Clay	(Argentina) Guillermo Coria	4–6, 6–2, 7–5
Win	1-2	Apr 2002	Barcelona, Spain	Clay	(Spain) Albert Costa	6–4, 6–0, 6–2
Win	2-2	Apr 2002	Majorca, Spain	Clay	(Finland) Jarkko Nieminen	6–2, 6–3
Loss	2-3	Jul 2002	Gstaad, Switzerland	Clay	(Spain) Àlex Corretja	6–3, 7–6^{(7–3)}, 7–6^{(7–3)}
Loss	2-4	Apr 2004	Barcelona, Spain	Clay	(Spain) Tommy Robredo	6–3, 4–6, 6–2, 3–6, 6–3
Win	3-4	May 2004	French Open, Paris	Clay	(Argentina) Guillermo Coria	0–6, 3–6, 6–4, 6–1, 8–6
Loss	3-5	Jul 2004	Båstad, Sweden	Clay	(Argentina) Mariano Zabaleta	6–1, 4–6, 7–6^{(7–4)}
Loss	3-6	Jul 2004	Stuttgart, Germany	Clay	(Argentina) Guillermo Cañas	5–7, 6–2, 6–0, 1–6, 6–3
Loss	3-7	Jul 2004	Kitzbühel, Austria	Clay	(Chile) Nicolás Massú	7–6^{(7–3)}, 6–4
Win	4-7	Jan 2005	Viña del Mar, Chile	Clay	(Chile) Fernando González	6–3, 6–4
Win	5-7	Feb 2005	Buenos Aires, Argentina	Clay	(Argentina) Mariano Puerta	6–4, 6–4
Win	6-7	Apr 2005	Estoril, Portugal	Clay	(Spain) Tommy Robredo	6–1, 2–6, 6–1
Win	7-7	Jul 2005	Gstaad, Switzerland	Clay	(Switzerland) Stanislas Wawrinka	6–4, 6–4
Loss	7-8	Jul 2005	Stuttgart, Germany	Clay	(Spain) Rafael Nadal	6–3, 6–3, 6–4
Win	8-8	Jul 2005	Kitzbühel, Austria	Clay	(Spain) Fernando Verdasco	2–6, 6–2, 6–4, 6–4

=== Doubles: 3 (3 titles) ===
Legend Grand Slam (0–0) Tennis Masters Cup (0–0) ATP Masters Series (0–0) ATP International Series Gold (1–0) ATP International Series (2–0)	Titles by surface Hard (0–0) Clay (3–0) Grass (0–0) Carpet (0–0)

Result	W/L	Date	Tournament	Surface	Partner	Opponents	Score
Win	1.	Feb 2004	Viña del Mar, Chile	Clay	(Argentina) Juan Ignacio Chela	(Ecuador) Nicolás Lapentti (Argentina) Martín Rodríguez	7–6^{(7–2)}, 7–6^{(7–3)}
Win	2.	Apr 2004	Estoril, Portugal	Clay	(Argentina) Juan Ignacio Chela	(Czech Republic) František Čermák (Czech Republic) Leoš Friedl	6–2, 6–1
Win	3.	Jul 2006	Stuttgart, Germany	Clay	(Belarus) Max Mirnyi	(Switzerland) Yves Allegro (Sweden) Robert Lindstedt	7–5, 6–7^{(4–7)}, [12–10]

== ATP Challenger finals ==
=== Singles: 9 (7 titles, 2 runner-up) ===
Result	W—L	Date	Tournament	Surface	Opponent in the final	Score
Loss	0–1	Aug 1998	Belo Horizonte Challenger, Brazil	Hard	(Brazil) Francisco Costa	6–4, 2–6, 4–6
Win	1–1	Aug 1998	Santa Cruz Challenger, Bolivia	Clay	(Ecuador) Luis Morejón	6–2, 6–3
Win	2–1	Dec 1998	Santiago Challenger, Chile	Clay	(Morocco) Karim Alami	6–2, 3–6, 6–4
Win	3–1	Apr 1999	Nice Challenger, France	Clay	(Spain) Jacobo Díaz	6–2, 6–3
Win	4–1	Apr 1999	Espinho Challenger, Portugal	Clay	(Austria) Markus Hipfl	6–4, 6–1
Win	5—1	Jun 2000	Braunschweig Challenger, Germany	Clay	(Argentina) Franco Squillari	6–4, 6–7^{(2–7)}, 6–4
Win	6—1	Apr 2009	Tunis Challenger, Tunisia	Clay	(Portugal) Frederico Gil	6–2, 1–6, 6–3
Loss	6–2	Sep 2009	Buenos Aires Challenger, Argentina	Clay	(Argentina) Horacio Zeballos	2—6, 6—3, 3—6
Win	7–2	May 2010	San Remo Challenger, Italy	Clay	(Argentina) Martín Vassallo Argüello	7–5, 6–0

=== Doubles: 1 (1 runner-up) ===
Result	W–L	Date	Tournament	Surface	Partner	Opponents	Score
Loss	0-1	Mar 1999	Barletta Challenger, Italy	Clay	(Argentina) Hernán Gumy	(Argentina) Guillermo Cañas (Spain) Javier Sánchez	6–4, 2–6, 2–6

== ITF Futures finals ==
=== Singles: 1 (1 titles) ===
Result	W–L	Date	Tournament	Surface	Opponent	Score
Win	1–0	Jul 1998	Spain F2	Clay	(Spain) Diego Hipperdinger	6–3, 6–4

=== Doubles: 1 (1 runner-up) ===
Result	W–L	Date	Tournament	Surface	Partner	Opponents	Score
Loss	0–1	Jun 1998	Germany F12	Clay	(Peru) Alejandro Aramburú	(Italy) Enzo Artoni (Argentina) Federico Browne	3–6, 3–6

== Performance timelines ==
=== Singles ===
Key
W	F	SF	QF	#R	RR	Q#	P#	DNQ	A	Z#	PO	G	S	B	NMS	NTI	P	NH

(W) winner; (F) finalist; (SF) semifinalist; (QF) quarterfinalist; (#R) rounds 4, 3, 2, 1; (RR) round-robin stage; (Q#) qualification round; (DNQ) did not qualify; (A) absent; (NH) not held; (SR) strike rate (events won / competed); (W–L) win–loss record.

Davis Cup and World Team Cup matches are included in the statistics. Walkovers are neither official wins nor official losses.

Tournament	1996	1997	1998	1999	2000	2001	2002	2003	2004	2005	2006	2007	2008	2009	2010	2011	SR	W–L
Grand Slam Tournaments
Australian Open	A	A	A	A	1R	1R	3R	2R	2R	3R	3R	1R	A	A	A	A	0 / 8	8–8
French Open	A	A	A	3R	2R	1R	4R	3R	W	4R	4R	2R	A	1R	Q2	A	1 / 10	22–9
Wimbledon	A	Q1	Q1	1R	1R	1R	2R	1R	A	A	2R	A	A	A	A	A	0 / 6	2–6
US Open	A	A	A	1R	1R	1R	3R	1R	2R	1R	3R	A	A	Q1	A	A	0 / 8	5–8
Win–loss	0–0	0–0	0–0	2–3	1–4	0–4	8–4	3–4	9–2	5–3	8–4	1–2	0–0	0–1	0–0	0–0	1 / 32	37–31
Year-end championship
Tennis Masters Cup	Did not qualify								RR	SF	Did not qualify						0 / 2	2–5
National representation
Summer Olympics	A	Not Held			1R	Not Held			A	Not Held			A	Not Held			0 / 1	0–1
Davis Cup	A	A	A	A	A	PO	SF	SF	A	A	A	A	A	A	A	A	0 / 3	13–3
ATP World Tour 1000
Indian Wells Masters	A	A	A	A	A	1R	QF	1R	3R	3R	3R	A	A	A	Q1	A	0 / 6	6–6
Miami Masters	A	A	A	A	2R	QF	4R	2R	2R	4R	2R	2R	A	Q1	Q1	A	0 / 8	10–8
Monte Carlo Masters	A	A	A	A	SF	2R	Q2	3R	2R	QF	SF	2R	A	A	A	A	0 / 7	16–7
Rome Masters	A	A	A	2R	2R	1R	1R	3R	1R	3R	1R	2R	A	A	A	A	0 / 9	7–9
Hamburg Masters	A	A	A	A	1R	3R	A	SF	1R	3R	2R	1R	A	NH			0 / 7	9–7
Madrid Masters ^{(clay)}	Not Held													A	A	A	0 / 0	0–0
Canada Masters	A	A	A	A	2R	2R	1R	1R	1R	QF	1R	A	A	A	A	A	0 / 7	5–7
Cincinnati Masters	A	A	A	A	1R	2R	1R	3R	2R	1R	A	A	A	A	A	A	0 / 6	4–6
Stuttgart Masters	A	A	A	A	A	Q1	Not Held										0 / 0	0–0
Madrid Masters ^{(hard)}	Not Held						1R	2R	A	2R	1R	A	A	Held on clay			0 / 4	1–4
Shanghai Masters	Not Held													A	A	A	0 / 0	0–0
Paris Masters	A	A	A	A	1R	A	2R	2R	2R	QF	A	A	A	A	A	A	0 / 5	4–5
Win–loss	0–0	0–0	0–0	1–1	7–8	8–7	7–7	12–9	3–8	15–9	6–7	3–4	0–0	0–0	0–0	0–0	0 / 60	62–60
Career statistics
Finals	0	0	0	0	1	1	3	0	5	6	0	0	0	0	0	0	16	
Titles	0	0	0	0	0	0	2	0	1	5	0	0	0	0	0	0	8	
Hard win–loss	0–0	0–0	0–0	0–2	6–10	5–9	13–10	7–10	5–11	10–10	5–6	1–3	0–0	0–0	0–0	0–0	52–71	
Clay win–loss	0–0	0–0	0–0	8–12	21–12	20–11	29–6	33–15	31–12	42–8	20–14	5–12	0–1	1–5	0–1	0–0	210–109	
Grass win–loss	0–0	0–0	0–0	0–1	0–1	0–1	1–1	0–1	0–0	0–0	1–1	0–0	0–0	0–0	0–0	0–0	2–6	
Carpet win–loss	0–0	0–0	0–0	0–0	0–2	2–2	0–1	0–0	1–1	3–3	0–1	0–0	0–0	Discontinued			6–10	
Overall win–loss	0–0	0–0	0–0	8–15	27–25	27–23	43–18	40–26	37–24	55–21	26–22	6–15	0–1	1–5	0–1	0–0	270–196	
Win %	–	–	–	35%	52%	54%	71%	61%	61%	72%	54%	29%	0%	17%	0%	–	57.93%	
Year End Ranking	323	639	138	73	34	48	21	34	10	10	34	182	–	167	326	–	$6,066,156	

== Career Grand Slam tournament seedings ==
The tournaments won by Gaudio are in boldface.

Legend
Seeded No. 1 (0 / 0)
Seeded No. 2 (0 / 0)
Seeded No. 3 (0 / 0)
Seeded No. 4–10 (0 / 6)
Seeded outside the top 10 (1 / 26)

Year	Australian Open	French Open	Wimbledon	US Open
1996	Did Not Play	Did Not Play	Did Not Play	Did Not Play
1997	Did Not Play	Did Not Play	Lost In Qualifying	Did Not Play
1998	Did Not Play	Did Not Play	Lost In Qualifying	Did Not Play
1999	Did Not Play	Not Seeded	Not Seeded	Not Seeded
2000	Not Seeded	Not Seeded	Not Seeded	Not Seeded
2001	Not Seeded	Not Seeded	32nd	Not Seeded
2002	Not Seeded	31st	24th	21st
2003	17th	21st	29th	29th
2004	Not Seeded	**Not Seeded**	Did Not Play	9th
2005	10th	5th	Did Not Play	9th
2006	8th	10th	16th	21st
2007	Not Seeded	Not Seeded	Did Not Play	Did Not Play
2008	Did Not Play	Did Not Play	Did Not Play	Did Not Play
2009	Did Not Play	Not Seeded	Did Not Play	Lost In Qualifying
2010	Did Not Play	Lost In Qualifying	Did Not Play	Did Not Play
2011	Did Not Play	Did Not Play	Did Not Play	Did Not Play

== Top 10 wins ==
Season	1996	1997	1998	1999	2000	2001	2002	2003	2004	2005	2006	2007	2008	2009	2010	Total
Wins	0	0	0	0	0	3	3	1	3	2	0	0	0	0	0	12

#	Player	Rank	Event	Surface	Rd	Score
2001
1.	(Russia) Yevgeny Kafelnikov	5	Miami, United States	Hard	3R	6–4, 6–1
2.	(Russia) Marat Safin	2	Hamburg, Germany	Clay	2R	6–0, 7–6^{(7–0)}
3.	(United States) Andre Agassi	2	Cincinnati, United States	Hard	1R	6–4, 7–6^{(7–3)}
2002
4.	(France) Sébastien Grosjean	8	Miami, United States	Hard	3R	7–6^{(9–7)}, 4–6, 6–1
5.	(Australia) Lleyton Hewitt	1	Barcelona, Spain	Clay	SF	6–4, 7–5
6.	(Brazil) Gustavo Kuerten	2	Majorca, Spain	Clay	QF	7–5, 6–0
2003
7.	(Spain) Juan Carlos Ferrero	3	Cincinnati, United States	Hard	2R	6–7^{(5–7)}, 6–1, 6–4
2004
8.	(Spain) Carlos Moyá	9	Barcelona, Spain	Clay	3R	6–4, 6–4
9.	(Argentina) David Nalbandian	8	French Open, Paris, France	Clay	SF	6–3, 7–6^{(7–5)}, 6–0
10.	(Argentina) Guillermo Coria	3	French Open, Paris, France	Clay	F	0–6, 3–6, 6–4, 6–1, 8–6
2005
11.	(Russia) Nikolay Davydenko	7	Stuttgart, Germany	Clay	SF	6–3, 2–1 r.
12.	(Argentina) Mariano Puerta	10	Tennis Masters Cup, Shanghai, China	Carpet(i)	RR	6–3, 7–5

== Summer Olympics matches ==
=== Singles ===
2000 Summer Olympic Games (Sydney)
Round	Opponent	Score
1R	(Belarus) Vladimir Voltchkov	6–7^{(4–7)}, 6–4, 1–6
