= 2001 Brasil Open – Women's singles =

Women's singles
- 2001 Brasil Open

Final
- Champion: (United States) Monica Seles
- Runner-up: (Federal Republic of Yugoslavia) Jelena Dokic
- Score: 6–3, 6–3

Details
- Draw: 28 (3WC/4Q/1LL)
- Seeds: 8

Events
Singles	men	women
Doubles	men	women
- Brasil Open

Rita Kuti-Kis was the defending champion but chose to compete at Waikoloa during the same week, losing in the first round to Adrienn Hegedűs.

Monica Seles won the title by defeating Jelena Dokic 6–3, 6–3 in the final.

== Seeds ==
The first four seeds received a bye to the second round.

1. (United States) Monica Seles (champion)
2. (Federal Republic of Yugoslavia) Jelena Dokic (final)
3. (South Africa) Amanda Coetzer (quarterfinals)
4. (Italy) Silvia Farina Elia (quarterfinals)
5. (Slovakia) Henrieta Nagyová (semifinals)
6. (Spain) Cristina Torrens Valero (second round)
7. (Switzerland) Patty Schnyder (first round)
8. (Russia) Tatiana Panova (quarterfinals)

== Draw ==
Key

- Q = Qualifier
- WC = Wild card
- LL = Lucky loser
- Alt = Alternate
- ITF = ITF entry
- PR = Protected ranking
- SR = Special ranking
- SE = Special exempt
- JE = Junior exempt
- JR = Junior Accelerator Programme entrant
- CO = College Accelerator Programme entrant
- NG = Next Gen Accelerator Program entrant
- w/o = Walkover
- r = Retired
- d = Defaulted

=== Finals ===
Semifinals
1/WC	(United States) Monica Seles	7	5	6
5	(Slovakia) Henrieta Nagyová	5	7	3
(Paraguay) Rossana de los Ríos	0	2
2	(Federal Republic of Yugoslavia) Jelena Dokic	6	6

Final
1/WC	(United States) Monica Seles	6	6
2	(Federal Republic of Yugoslavia) Jelena Dokic	3	3

=== Top half ===
First round
(Slovakia) J Husárová	6	6
(Germany) B Rittner	4	3
WC	(Brazil) J Cortez	7^{7}	6
LL	(Argentina) C Fernández	6^{4}	2
(Spain) A Medina Garrigues	6	1	3
8	(Russia) T Panova	4	6	6
(Spain) M Marrero	1	6	3
Q	(Netherlands) S Noorlander	6	1	6
Q	(Russia) A Myskina	6	6
(Germany) A Glass	4	1
(Spain) MJ Martínez Sánchez	1	0
5	(Slovakia) H Nagyová	6	6

Second round
1/WC	(United States) M Seles	6	1	6
(Slovakia) J Husárová	3	6	3
WC	(Brazil) J Cortez	1	3
8	(Russia) T Panova	6	6
3	(South Africa) A Coetzer	6	6
Q	(Netherlands) S Noorlander	2	4
Q	(Russia) A Myskina
5	(Slovakia) H Nagyová	w/o

Quarterfinals
1/WC	(United States) M Seles	6	6
8	(Russia) T Panova	1	0
3	(South Africa) A Coetzer	1	4
5	(Slovakia) H Nagyová	6	6

Semifinals
1/WC	(United States) M Seles	7	5	6
5	(Slovakia) H Nagyová	5	7	3

=== Bottom half ===
First round
7	(Switzerland) P Schnyder	6^{4}	4
(South Africa) J Kruger	7^{7}	6
(Paraguay) R de los Ríos	6	7^{8}
(Germany) B Lamade	4	6^{6}
(Spain) G León García	2	2
(France) N Dechy	6	6
6	(Spain) C Torrens Valero	6	6
(Argentina) M Díaz Oliva	4	2
(Spain) V Ruano Pascual	6	6^{2}	0
Q	(United States) S Reeves	3	7^{7}	6
Q	(Argentina) ME Salerni	4	7	4
WC	(Croatia) I Majoli	6	5	6

Second round
(South Africa) J Kruger	6^{4}	4
(Paraguay) R de los Ríos	7^{7}	6
(France) N Dechy	4	6	1
4	(Italy) S Farina Elia	6	1	6
6	(Spain) C Torrens Valero	1	2
Q	(United States) S Reeves	6	6
WC	(Croatia) I Majoli	1	2
2	(Federal Republic of Yugoslavia) J Dokic	6	6

Quarterfinals
(Paraguay) R de los Ríos	6	6
4	(Italy) S Farina Elia	3	2
Q	(United States) S Reeves	3	2
2	(Federal Republic of Yugoslavia) J Dokic	6	6

Semifinals
(Paraguay) R de los Ríos	0	2
2	(Federal Republic of Yugoslavia) J Dokic	6	6

== See also ==
- Brasil Tennis Cup (WTA event held from 1999 to 2002)
