= 2001 Brasil Open – Women's doubles =

Women's doubles
- 2001 Brasil Open

Final
- Champions: (South Africa) Amanda Coetzer (United States) Lori McNeil
- Runners-up: (United States) Nicole Arendt (Argentina) Patricia Tarabini
- Score: 6–7^{(8–10)}, 6–2, 6–4

Events
Singles	men	women
Doubles	men	women
- Brasil Open

Laura Montalvo and Paola Suárez were the defending champions, but Suárez did not compete this year. Montalvo teamed up with María Emilia Salerni and lost in the quarterfinals to Silvia Farina Elia and Janette Husárová.

Amanda Coetzer and Lori McNeil won the title by defeating Nicole Arendt and Patricia Tarabini 6–7^{(8–10)}, 6–2, 6–4 in the final.

== Seeds ==
1. (Federal Republic of Yugoslavia) Jelena Dokic / (Spain) Virginia Ruano Pascual (first round)
2. (United States) Nicole Arendt / (Argentina) Patricia Tarabini (final)
3. (Spain) María José Martínez Sánchez / (Spain) Anabel Medina Garrigues (first round)
4. (Italy) Silvia Farina Elia / (Slovakia) Janette Husárová (semifinals)

== Draw ==
Key

- Q = Qualifier
- WC = Wild card
- LL = Lucky loser
- Alt = Alternate
- ITF = ITF entry
- PR = Protected ranking
- SR = Special ranking
- SE = Special exempt
- JE = Junior exempt
- JR = Junior Accelerator Programme entrant
- CO = College Accelerator Programme entrant
- NG = Next Gen Accelerator Program entrant
- w/o = Walkover
- r = Retired
- d = Defaulted

=== Draw ===
First round
1	(Federal Republic of Yugoslavia) J Dokic (Spain) V Ruano Pascual	3	4
Q	(Russia) A Myskina (Russia) T Panova	6	6
(South Africa) A Coetzer (United States) L McNeil	4	6	6
(South Africa) J Kruger (Brazil) V Menga	6	0	1
3	(Spain) MJ Martínez Sánchez (Spain) A Medina Garrigues	0	5
(Slovakia) H Nagyová (Germany) B Rittner	6	7
(Brazil) J Cortez (Argentina) C Fernández	7^{13}	6
(Germany) V Henke (Netherlands) S Noorlander	6^{11}	3
WC	(Brazil) MF Alves (Brazil) C Tiene	3	3
(Argentina) L Montalvo (Argentina) ME Salerni	6	6
(South Africa) K Grant (Spain) C Torrens Valero	4	1
4	(Italy) S Farina Elia (Slovakia) J Husárová	6	6
(Germany) B Lamade (Switzerland) P Schnyder	7^{7}	1	7
(Germany) A Glass (Spain) M Marrero	6^{4}	6	5
(Argentina) M Díaz Oliva (Austria) S Plischke	6	3	2
2	(United States) N Arendt (Argentina) P Tarabini	1	6	6

Quarterfinals
Q	(Russia) A Myskina (Russia) T Panova
(South Africa) A Coetzer (United States) L McNeil	w/o
(Slovakia) H Nagyová (Germany) B Rittner	6	6
(Brazil) J Cortez (Argentina) C Fernández	0	4
(Argentina) L Montalvo (Argentina) ME Salerni	6	4	3
4	(Italy) S Farina Elia (Slovakia) J Husárová	4	6	6
(Germany) B Lamade (Switzerland) P Schnyder	3	3
2	(United States) N Arendt (Argentina) P Tarabini	6	6

Semifinals
(South Africa) A Coetzer (United States) L McNeil	7	6
(Slovakia) H Nagyová (Germany) B Rittner	5	4
4	(Italy) S Farina Elia (Slovakia) J Husárová	6	4	2
2	(United States) N Arendt (Argentina) P Tarabini	3	6	6

Final
(South Africa) A Coetzer (United States) L McNeil	6^{8}	6	6
2	(United States) N Arendt (Argentina) P Tarabini	7^{10}	2	4

== See also ==
- Brasil Tennis Cup (WTA event held from 1999 to 2002)
