= 2002 Open SEAT Godó =

- Date: 22–28 April
- Edition: 50th
- Category: International Series Gold
- Draw: 56S / 28D
- Prize money: $955,000
- Surface: Clay / outdoor
- Location: Barcelona, Spain
- Venue: Real Club de Tenis Barcelona

Champions

Singles
- (Argentina) Gastón Gaudio

Doubles
- (Australia) Michael Hill / (Czech Republic) Daniel Vacek
- Torneo Godó

The 2002 Open SEAT Godó, also known as the Trofeo Conde de Godó, was a men's tennis tournament played on outdoor clay courts at the Real Club de Tenis Barcelona in Barcelona, Spain and was part of the International Series Gold of the 2002 ATP Tour. It was the 50th edition of the tournament and ran from 22 April until 28 April 2002. Unseeded Gastón Gaudio won the singles title.

This event also carried the joint denominations of the Campeonatos Internacionales de España or Spanish International Championships that was hosted at this venue and location, and was 35th edition to be held in Barcelona, and the Open Seat Godó (sponsorship name) and is the 7th edition branded under that name.

== Finals ==
=== Singles ===
(Argentina) Gastón Gaudio defeated (Spain) Albert Costa 6–4, 6–0, 6–2

- It was Gaudio's first singles title of his career.

=== Doubles ===
(Australia) Michael Hill / (Czech Republic) Daniel Vacek defeated (Argentina) Lucas Arnold / (Argentina) Gastón Etlis 6–4, 6–4

- It was Hill's only title of the year and the 3rd of his career. It was Vacek's only title of the year and the 25th of his career.
