= Jan Vacek =

Czech tennis player (born 1976)

- Country (sports): Czech Republic
- Residence: Prague, Czech Republic
- Born: 10 May 1976 (age 49); Prague, Czechoslovakia
- Height: 6 ft 6 in (198 cm)
- Turned pro: 1999
- Retired: 2008
- Plays: Right-handed (two-handed backhand)
- Prize money: $794,420

Singles
- Career record: 30-60
- Career titles: 1
- Highest ranking: No. 61 (5 August 2002)

Grand Slam singles results
- Australian Open: 2R (2004)
- French Open: 1R (2002, 2004)
- Wimbledon: 4R (2002)
- US Open: 1R (2001, 2002, 2003)

Doubles
- Career record: 5-5
- Career titles: 0
- Highest ranking: No. 115 (25 April 2005)

Jan Vacek (yahn VAH-tseck; born 10 May 1976) is a retired professional male tennis player from the Czech Republic.

Vacek reached a career high ATP singles ranking of World No. 61, achieved on 5 August 2002. He also reached a career high ATP doubles ranking of World No. 115, achieved on 25 April 2005.

Vacek successfully played in all four Grand Slam tournament main draws, highlighted by reaching the fourth round at the 2002 Wimbledon Championships.

Vacek reached 21 singles finals throughout his career, posting a record of 13 wins and 8 losses, which includes a 4–3 result in ATP Challenger finals. Unseeded at the 2001 Brasil Open, he won the singles championship, defeating eighth seed Mariano Zabaleta 3–6, 6–4, 7–6^{(8–6)} in the second round, sixth seed Alexandre Simoni 7–6^{(7–5)}, 6–2 in the semi-finals and fifth seed Fernando Meligeni 2–6, 7–6^{(7–2)}, 6–3 in the final to claim his first and only ATP Tour title.

== ATP Tour finals ==
Legend
Grand Slam (0)
Tennis Masters Cup (0)
ATP Masters Series (0)
ATP Tour (1)

=== Singles (1 title) ===
Result	W/L	Date	Tournament	Surface	Opponent	Score
Win	1–0	Sep 2001	Salvador, Brazil	Hard	(Brazil) Fernando Meligeni	2–6, 7–6^{(7–2)}, 6–3

=== Doubles (1 runner-up) ===
Result	W/L	Date	Tournament	Surface	Partner	Opponents	Score
Loss	0–1	Sep 2004	's-Hertogenbosch, Netherlands	Grass	(Germany) Lars Burgsmüller	(Czech Republic) Martin Damm (Czech Republic) Cyril Suk	3–6, 7–6^{(9–7)}, 3–6

== ATP Challenger and ITF Futures finals ==
=== Singles: 20 (12–8) ===
Legend (singles) ATP Challenger Tour (4–3) ITF World Tennis Tour (8–5)	Finals by surface Hard (6–4) Clay (5–3) Grass (0–0) Carpet (1–1)

Result	W–L	Date	Tournament	Tier	Surface	Opponent	Score
Win	1–0	Jul 1998	Slovenia F2, Portorož	Futures	Clay	(Italy) Igor Gaudi	walkover
Loss	1–1	Aug 1998	Slovenia F4, Portorož	Futures	Clay	(Croatia) Zeljko Krajan	3–6, 3–6
Win	2–1	Aug 1998	Austria F8, Vienna	Futures	Clay	(Slovakia) Tomáš Čatár	4–6, 6–4, 7–6
Loss	2–2	Jul 1999	Slovenia F2, Portorož	Futures	Clay	(Italy) Uros Vico	4–6, 2–6
Win	3–2	Aug 1999	Slovenia F3, Maribor	Futures	Clay	(Austria) Oliver Marach	6–4, 6–3
Loss	3–3	Aug 1999	Belgium F1, Jupille-sur-Meuse	Futures	Clay	(Belgium) Olivier Rochus	6–7, 2–6
Win	4–3	Oct 1999	Germany F12, Offenbach	Futures	Hard	(Finland) Tommi Lenho	7–6, 6–0
Win	5–3	Feb 2000	Croatia F1, Zagreb	Futures	Hard	(United States) Alex Witt	6–4, 6–3
Loss	5–4	Apr 2000	Germany F1, Berlin	Futures	Hard	(Germany) Daniel Elsner	2–6, 5–7
Win	6–4	Oct 2000	France F23, La Roche-sur-Yon	Futures	Hard	(Belgium) Arnaud Fontaine	6–4, 6–2
Win	7–4	Dec 2000	Prague, Czech Republic	Challenger	Hard	(Switzerland) Ivo Heuberger	6–7^{(7–9)}, 7–5, 6–3
Loss	7–5	Feb 2001	Hamburg, Germany	Challenger	Carpet	(France) Michaël Llodra	4–6, 3–6
Win	8–5	May 2001	Rocky Mount, United States	Challenger	Clay	(Paraguay) Ramón Delgado	7–6^{(7–0)}, 7–5
Win	9–5	Aug 2001	Linz, Austria	Challenger	Clay	(Austria) Markus Hipfl	1–6, 6–1, 6–2
Loss	9–6	Mar 2004	Wrexham, United Kingdom	Challenger	Hard	(Netherlands) Dennis Van Scheppingen	4–6, 1–6
Win	10–6	Oct 2005	Czech Republic F5, Opava	Futures	Hard	(Romania) Victor Crivoi	6–3, 6–3
Win	11–6	Apr 2006	Cardiff, United Kingdom	Challenger	Hard	(Italy) Uros Vico	7–6^{(7–5)}, 1–6, 6–3
Win	12–6	Jan 2007	Austria F1, Bergheim	Futures	Carpet	(Netherlands) Antal van der Duim	6–3, 6–3
Loss	12–7	Feb 2007	Croatia F2, Zagreb	Futures	Hard	(Croatia) Vjekoslav Skenderovic	6–7^{(2–7)}, 6–7^{(0–7)}
Loss	12–8	Jun 2007	Busan, South Korea	Challenger	Hard	(Chinese Taipei) Jimmy Wang	3–6, 2–6

=== Doubles: 11 (5–6) ===
Legend (doubles) ATP Challenger Tour (4–4) ITF World Tennis Tour (1–2)	Finals by surface Hard (3–1) Clay (2–4) Grass (0–0) Carpet (0–1)

Result	W–L	Date	Tournament	Tier	Surface	Partner	Opponents	Score
Loss	0–1	Aug 1998	Slovenia F4, Portorož	Futures	Clay	(Czech Republic) Jan Hernych	(Czech Republic) Petr Kovačka (Czech Republic) Leoš Friedl	3–6, 2–6
Loss	0–2	Aug 1999	Slovenia F3, Maribor	Futures	Clay	(Czech Republic) Pavel Riha	(Slovenia) Marko Dolecek (Slovenia) Borut Martincevic	5–7, 6–7
Loss	0–3	Aug 2004	Trani, Italy	Challenger	Clay	(Czech Republic) Martin Štěpánek	(Italy) Massimo Bertolini (Spain) Álex López Morón	6–2, 4–6, 3–6
Win	1–3	Sep 2004	Aschaffenburg, Germany	Challenger	Clay	(Czech Republic) Ota Fukárek	(Hungary) Kornél Bardóczky (Hungary) Gergely Kisgyörgy	3–6, 6–4, 6–3
Loss	1–4	Feb 2005	Belgrade, Serbia and Montenegro	Challenger	Carpet	(Czech Republic) Lukáš Dlouhý	(Russia) Igor Kunitsyn (Ukraine) Orest Tereshchuk	walkover
Loss	1–5	Mar 2005	Sarajevo, Bosnia & Herzegovina	Challenger	Hard	(Czech Republic) Lukáš Dlouhý	(Slovakia) Michal Mertiňák (Ukraine) Sergiy Stakhovsky	7–6^{(10–8)}, 2–6, 2–6
Loss	1–6	Mar 2005	Saint Brieuc, France	Challenger	Clay	(Slovakia) Michal Mertiňák	(Romania) Victor Ioniță (Romania) Gabriel Moraru	1–6, 4–6
Win	2–6	Aug 2005	Vigo, Spain	Challenger	Clay	(Germany) Lars Uebel	(Spain) Guillem Burniol (Spain) José Antonio Sánchez de Luna	6–4, 6–3
Win	3–6	Feb 2007	Wrocław, Poland	Challenger	Hard	(Czech Republic) Lukáš Rosol	(Slovakia) Michal Mertiňák (Switzerland) Jean-Claude Scherrer	7–5, 7–6^{(7–4)}
Win	4–6	Feb 2007	Croatia F2, Zagreb	Futures	Hard	(Czech Republic) Jaroslav Pospíšil	(Croatia) Nikola Mektić (Croatia) Vedran Siljegovic	6–3, 4–6, 6–3
Win	5–6	Apr 2007	Cardiff, United Kingdom	Challenger	Hard	(Czech Republic) Pavel Šnobel	(South Africa) Wesley Moodie (Australia) Paul Baccanello	walkover

== Performance timeline ==
Key
W	F	SF	QF	#R	RR	Q#	DNQ	A	NH

(W) winner; (F) finalist; (SF) semifinalist; (QF) quarterfinalist; (#R) rounds 4, 3, 2, 1; (RR) round-robin stage; (Q#) qualification round; (DNQ) did not qualify; (A) absent; (NH) not held; (SR) strike rate (events won / competed); (W–L) win–loss record.

=== Singles ===
Tournament	2000	2001	2002	2003	2004	2005	2006	2007	2008	SR	W–L	Win %
Grand Slam tournaments
Australian Open	A	Q1	1R	1R	2R	Q1	A	A	A	0 / 3	1–3	25%
French Open	A	Q1	1R	A	1R	A	Q1	A	Q1	0 / 2	0–2	0%
Wimbledon	A	1R	4R	A	1R	A	A	A	Q2	0 / 3	3–3	50%
US Open	Q1	1R	1R	1R	Q3	Q1	Q3	Q2	A	0 / 3	0–3	0%
Win–loss	0–0	0–2	3–4	0–2	1–3	0–0	0–0	0–0	0–0	0 / 11	4–11	27%
ATP Tour Masters 1000
Indian Wells Masters	A	A	Q1	A	A	A	A	A	A	0 / 0	0–0	–
Miami Open	A	Q1	2R	1R	A	A	A	A	A	0 / 2	1–2	33%
Hamburg Masters	A	A	A	A	Q1	A	A	A	A	0 / 0	0–0	–
Cincinnati Masters	A	A	A	Q1	A	A	A	A	A	0 / 0	0–0	–
Stuttgart	A	Q1	Not Held							0 / 0	0–0	–
Win–loss	0–0	0–0	1–1	0–1	0–0	0–0	0–0	0–0	0–0	0 / 2	1–2	33%
