= Didac Pérez =

Spanish tennis player (born 1981)

- Country (sports): Spain
- Residence: Sabadell, Spain
- Born: 7 September 1981 (age 43); Barcelona, Spain
- Height: 5 ft 10 in (178 cm)
- Plays: Right-handed
- Prize money: $121,472

Singles
- Career record: 1-6
- Career titles: 0
- Highest ranking: No. 162 (9 Sep 2002)

Grand Slam singles results
- French Open: 1R (2002)

Doubles
- Career record: 1-2
- Career titles: 0
- Highest ranking: No. 237 (10 Sep 2001)

Didac Pérez Minarro (b. Barcelona, 7 September 1981) is a former professional tennis player from Spain.

== Career ==
Perez won his only ATP Tour match in the 2002 Open SEAT Godó, which was held in the city of his birth, Barcelona. He defeated world number 52 Fernando Meligeni.

In the 2002 French Open, his only Grand Slam appearance, Perez lost in the first round to countryman Feliciano López, in five sets.

== Challenger titles ==
=== Singles: (3) ===
No.	Year	Tournament	Surface	Opponent in the final	Score in the final
1.	2001	Budapest, Hungary	Clay	(Ukraine) Orest Tereshchuk	6–2, 6–3
2.	2002	Olbia, Italy	Clay	(Argentina) Leonardo Olguín	2–6, 6–4, 6–3
3.	2004	Cagliari, Italy	Clay	(Spain) Marc López	6–4, 6–1

=== Doubles: (1) ===
No.	Year	Tournament	Surface	Partner	Opponents in the final	Score in the final
1.	2001	Sassuolo, Italy	Clay	(Spain) Gabriel Trujillo-Soler	(Italy) Manuel Jorquera (Italy) Tomas Tenconi	6–3, 6–2
