= Cristian Kordasz =

Argentine tennis player

- Full name: Cristian Kordasz
- Country (sports): Argentina
- Born: 31 July 1978 (age 46); Zárate, Argentina
- Prize money: $87,964

Singles
- Highest ranking: No. 199 (7 August 2000)

Grand Slam singles results
- Australian Open: Q1 (2004)
- French Open: Q2 (2002)
- Wimbledon: Q1 (2000, 2003)
- US Open: Q1 (2000, 2002)

Doubles
- Highest ranking: No. 181 (16 July 2001)

Cristian Kordasz (born 31 July 1978) is a former professional tennis player from Argentina.

== Biography ==
Kordasz was born in Zárate near Buenos Aires and raised in the coastal city of Necochea. At the age of 18 he emigrated to Orléans in France to pursue a career in tennis.

A right-hander, Kordasz attained his career best singles ranking of 199 in 2000. In doubles he made it to 181 in the world and won a Challenger title in Kyiv, partnering Gábor Köves. He didn't reach any Challenger finals in singles but had a win over David Nalbandian, then 52 in the world, at the Santiago Challenger in 2001. Over the course of his career he competed in the qualifying draws of all four grand slam tournaments. He retired from professional tennis due to arrhythmia.

He began coaching Canadian tennis player Aleksandra Wozniak in the 2008 season, then in 2010 became coach of Anna Chakvetadze.

== Challenger titles ==
=== Doubles: (1) ===
No.	Year	Tournament	Surface	Partner	Opponents	Score
1.	2000	Kyiv, Ukraine	Clay	(Hungary) Gábor Köves	(Uzbekistan) Oleg Ogorodov (Russia) Andrei Stoliarov	6–4, 7–5
