= Alexandre Simoni =

Brazilian tennis player (born 1979)

- Country (sports): Brazil
- Born: 2 July 1979 (age 47) São Paulo, Brazil
- Height: 1.87 m (6 ft 1 1/2 in)
- Turned pro: 1997
- Plays: Right-handed
- Prize money: US$394,788

Singles
- Career record: 10–22 (at ATP Tour-level, Grand Slam-level, and in Davis Cup)
- Career titles: 0
- Highest ranking: No. 96 (16 July 2001)

Grand Slam singles results
- Australian Open: 2R (2002)
- French Open: Q2 (2003)
- Wimbledon: 1R (2002)
- US Open: 1R (2001)

Doubles
- Career record: 11–13 (at ATP Tour-level, Grand Slam-level, and in Davis Cup)
- Career titles: 0
- Highest ranking: No. 119 (7 October 2002)

Grand Slam doubles results
- Wimbledon: Q1 (2000, 2001, 2003)
- US Open: 1R (2002)

Alexandre Torres Simoni (born 2 July 1979) is a retired professional Brazilian tennis player. After being ranked as high as No. 23 in the ITF World Junior Ranking, he turned professional in 1997.

On the ATP tour, his best results were in 2001, when he reached two semifinals: in Bogotá and Salvador. He also reached his career-high ranking of No. 96. He was also a member of the Brazilian Davis Cup team, having participated in a total of four ties from 2001 to 2004 and collecting a 2–3 Win/Loss record.

Simoni played his last official match in January 2008, and nowadays works as a tennis coach in São Paulo.

== Titles ==
=== Singles (3) ===
Legend Grand Slam (0) Tennis Masters Cup (0) ATP Masters Series (0) ATP Tour (0) Challengers (3)	Titles by surface Hard (1) Grass (0) Clay (2) Carpet (0)

No.	Date	Tournament	Surface	Opponent in the final	Score
1.	July 31, 2000	Gramado, Brazil	Hard	(United Kingdom) Martin Lee	6–4, 7–4
2.	September 18, 2002	Brasov, Romania	Clay	(Belgium) Dick Norman	7–5, 6–3
3.	May 6, 2002	Edinburgh, Scotland	Clay	(Monaco) Jean-René Lisnard	6–3, 6–3

=== Doubles (9) ===
Legend Grand Slam (0) Tennis Masters Cup (0) ATP Masters Series (0) ATP Tour (0) Challengers (9)	Titles by surface Hard (4) Grass (0) Clay (5) Carpet (0)

No.	Date	Tournament	Surface	Partnering	Opponents in the final	Score
1.	August 2, 1999	Gramado, Brazil	Hard	(Brazil) Antonio Prieto	(Paraguay) Paulo Carvallo (Brazil) Ricardo Schlachter	6–1, 6–4
2.	June 26, 2000	Eisenach, Germany	Clay	(Brazil) Daniel Melo	(Mexico) Enrique Abaroa (Australia) Tim Crichton	6–1, 6–7^{(2)}, 6–1
3.	July 10, 2000	Oberstaufen, Germany	Clay	(United States) Hugo Armando	(Germany) Tomas Behrend (Germany) Karsten Braasch	6–4, 6–3
4.	August 7, 2000	Belo Horizonte, Brazil	Hard	(Brazil) Daniel Melo	(United Kingdom) Jamie Delgado (United Kingdom) Martin Lee	6–4, 6–4
5.	October 29, 2001	Santiago, Chile	Clay	(Brazil) André Sá	(Brazil) Daniel Melo (Serbia) Dušan Vemić	3–6, 6–3, 7–6^{(3)}
6.	July 28, 2003	Belo Horizonte, Brazil	Hard	(Brazil) Marcos Daniel	(Japan) Kentaro Masuda (Japan) Takahiro Terachi	6–4, 6–2
7.	September 1, 2003	Gramado, Brazil	Hard	(Brazil) Marcos Daniel	(Mexico) Santiago González (Mexico) Alejandro Hernández	7–6^{(5)}, 6–4
8.	October 6, 2003	Quito, Ecuador	Clay	(Brazil) Ricardo Mello	(United States) Hugo Armando (Brazil) Ricardo Schlachter	6–3, 6–4
9.	August 7, 2006	Joinville, Brazil	Clay	(Brazil) André Ghem	(Brazil) Marcelo Melo (Brazil) André Sá	6–4, 5–7, [10–8]

== Runners-up (16) ==
=== Singles (4) ===
Legend Grand Slam (0) Tennis Masters Cup (0) ATP Masters Series (0) ATP Tour (0) Challengers (4)	Finals by surface Hard (4) Grass (0) Clay (0) Carpet (0)

No.	Date	Tournament	Surface	Opponent in the final	Score
1.	December 4, 2000	San José, Costa Rica	Hard	(France) Antony Dupuis	7–6^{(5)}, 4–6, 6–3
2.	May 28, 2001	Salvador, Brazil	Hard	(Brazil) André Sá	6–3, 6–2
3.	July 2, 2001	Campos do Jordão, Brazil	Hard	(Brazil) Ricardo Mello	7–6^{(6)}, 4–6, 7–6^{(5)}
4.	July 29, 2002	Belo Horizonte, Brazil	Hard	(Brazil) Ricardo Mello	6–3, 6–3

=== Doubles (12) ===
Legend Grand Slam (0) Tennis Masters Cup (0) ATP Masters Series (0) ATP Tour (1) Challengers (11)	Finals by surface Hard (6) Grass (0) Clay (6) Carpet (0)

No.	Date	Tournament	Surface	Partnering	Opponents in the final	Score
1.	May 8, 2000	Fergana, Uzbekistan	Hard	(Brazil) Daniel Melo	(Israel) Jonathan Erlich (Israel) Lior Mor	6–4, 6–0
2.	May 15, 2000	Samarkand, Uzbekistan	Clay	(Brazil) Daniel Melo	(Italy) Stefano Galvani (Russia) Andrei Stoliarov	W/O
3.	August 6, 2000	Gramado, Brazil	Hard	(Brazil) Daniel Melo	(Brazil) André Sá (Philippines) Eric Taino	7–6^{(7)}, 7–6^{(3)}
4.	May 14, 2001	Zagreb, Croatia	Clay	(North Macedonia) Aleksandar Kitinov	(Italy) Enzo Artoni (Argentina) Andrés Schneiter	6–7^{(5)}, 6–4, 6–4
5.	October 15, 2001	Brasília, Brazil	Clay	(Brazil) Daniel Melo	(Argentina) Luis Lobo (Argentina) Daniel Orsanic	W/O
6.	April 15, 2002	Bermuda, Bermuda	Clay	(Paraguay) Ramón Delgado	(Switzerland) George Bastl (South Africa) Neville Godwin	7–5, 6–3
7.	July 15, 2002	Amersfoort, The Netherlands	Clay	(Brazil) André Sá	(South Africa) Jeff Coetzee (South Africa) Chris Haggard	7–6^{(1)}, 6–3
8.	June 23, 2003	Andorra, Andorra	Hard	(Brazil) Ricardo Mello	(South Africa) Rik de Voest (Finland) Tuomas Ketola	6–4, 3–6, 6–4
9.	August 2, 2004	Gramado, Brazil	Hard	(Brazil) Henrique Mello	(Mexico) Santiago González (Brazil) Bruno Soares	6–3, 6–3
10.	March 13, 2006	Salinas, Ecuador	Hard	(Brazil) André Ghem	(Brazil) Thiago Alves (Brazil) Júlio Silva	3–6, 6–4, [10–4]
11.	January 1, 2007	São Paulo, Brazil	Hard	(Brazil) Marcelo Melo	(Uruguay) Pablo Cuevas (Chile) Adrián García	6–4, 6–2
12.	April 2, 2007	Monza, Italy	Clay	(Brazil) Ricardo Hocevar	(Australia) Nathan Healey (Australia) Jordan Kerr	6–4, 6–3
