= Daniel Melo =

Brazilian tennis player

- Country (sports): Brazil
- Residence: Belo Horizonte, Brazil
- Born: July 4, 1977 (age 48); Belo Horizonte, Brazil
- Height: 1.85 m (6 ft 1 in)
- Turned pro: 1997
- Retired: 2006
- Plays: Left-handed
- Prize money: $223,693

Singles
- Career record: 0–3 (ATP Tour level, Grand Slam level, and Davis Cup)
- Career titles: 0
- Highest ranking: No. 151 (November 19, 2001)

Grand Slam singles results
- Australian Open: Q1 (1999, 2002)
- French Open: Q1 (1999, 2000, 2002)
- Wimbledon: Q2 (2000)
- US Open: Q1 (1999, 2000, 2001, 2002)

Doubles
- Career record: 8–12 (ATP Tour level, Grand Slam level, and Davis Cup)
- Career titles: 1
- Highest ranking: No. 79 (March 4, 2002)

Grand Slam doubles results
- Australian Open: 2R (2002)
- French Open: 1R (2002)
- Wimbledon: 1R (2002)
- US Open: 1R (2002)

Daniel Melo (born July 4, 1977, in Belo Horizonte, Brazil) is a former professional tennis player from Brazil. He is the older brother of Marcelo Melo, also a tennis player.

Melo has won one ATP Tour title, 2001 Brasil Open doubles title when, together with Enzo Artoni, he defeated Gastón Etlis and Brent Haygarth in the final 6–3, 1–6, 7–6.

== Career titles ==
=== Doubles (1) ===
| Legend Grand Slam (0) Tennis Masters Cup (0) ATP Masters Series (0) ATP Tour (1) | Titles by surface Hard (0) Grass (0) Clay (1) Carpet (0) |

| Result | W-L | Date | Tournament | Surface | Partner | Opponents | Score |
|---|---|---|---|---|---|---|---|
| Win | 1–0 | Sep 2001 | Costa do Sauípe, Brazil | Hard | (Italy) Enzo Artoni | (Argentina) Gastón Etlis (South Africa) Brent Haygarth | 6–3, 1–6, 7–6^{(7–5)} |
