= 2010 Carisap Tennis Cup – Singles =

Singles
- 2010 Carisap Tennis Cup

Final
- Champion: (Argentina) Carlos Berlocq
- Runner-up: (Spain) Daniel Gimeno Traver
- Score: 6–3, 4–6, 6–4

Events
Singles	Doubles
← 2009 ·	Carisap Tennis Cup	· 2011 →

Fabio Fognini was the defending champion, but chose not to play.
Carlos Berlocq won the final against Daniel Gimeno Traver 6–3, 4–6, 6–4.

== Seeds ==
1. (Spain) Pere Riba (quarterfinals)
2. (Spain) Daniel Gimeno Traver (finals)
3. (Italy) Paolo Lorenzi (quarterfinals)
4. (Spain) Albert Ramos Viñolas (semifinals)
5. (Romania) Adrian Ungur (semifinals)
6. (Argentina) Carlos Berlocq (champion)
7. (Czech Republic) Dušan Lojda (quarterfinals)
8. (Slovakia) Martin Kližan (quarterfinals)

== Draw ==
=== Key ===
- Q = Qualifier
- WC = Wild card
- LL = Lucky loser
- Alt = Alternate
- SE = Special exempt
- PR = Protected ranking
- ITF = ITF entry
- JE = Junior exempt
- w/o = Walkover
- r = Retired
- d = Defaulted
- SR = Special ranking

=== Finals ===
Semifinals
6	(Argentina) Carlos Berlocq	7	6
4	(Spain) Albert Ramos Viñolas	5	3
5	(Romania) Adrian Ungur	2	2
2/WC	(Spain) Daniel Gimeno Traver	6	6

Final
6	(Argentina) Carlos Berlocq	6	4	6
2/WC	(Spain) Daniel Gimeno Traver	3	6	4

=== Top half ===
First round
1	(Spain) P Riba	7	6
(Spain) S Gutiérrez-Ferrol	5	4
(Italy) A di Mauro	6^{4}	6	4
(Spain) P Clar-Rosselló	7	2	6
WC	(Italy) T Fabbiano	6	6
Q	(Portugal) Gonçalo Pereira	1	3
(Italy) D Giorgini	3	1
6	(Argentina) C Berlocq	6	6
4	(Spain) A Ramos Viñolas	7	6^{2}	6
(Italy) A Brizzi	6^{2}	7	0
(Germany) M Bachinger	6	5	4
(Italy) F Aldi	3	7	6
(Tunisia) M Jaziri	1	1
Q	(Russia) D Sitak	6	6
WC	(Italy) Enrico Fioravante	4	4
7	(Czech Republic) D Lojda	6	6

Second round
1	(Spain) P Riba	6	6
(Spain) P Clar-Rosselló	2	1
WC	(Italy) T Fabbiano	0	3
6	(Argentina) C Berlocq	6	6
4	(Spain) A Ramos Viñolas	7	6
(Italy) F Aldi	6^{3}	2
Q	(Russia) D Sitak	0	r
7	(Czech Republic) D Lojda	0

Quarterfinals
1	(Spain) P Riba	4	2
6	(Argentina) C Berlocq	6	6
4	(Spain) A Ramos Viñolas	7	6
7	(Czech Republic) D Lojda	5	4

Semifinals
6	(Argentina) C Berlocq	7	6
4	(Spain) A Ramos Viñolas	5	3

=== Bottom half ===
First round
5	(Romania) A Ungur	6	6
(Argentina) M Vassallo Argüello	4	4
Q	(Portugal) P Sousa	0	2
(Italy) F Cipolla	6	6
(Slovakia) P Červenák	5	6	6
Q	(Slovenia) J Semrajc	7	3	2
WC	(Italy) Giacomo Miccini	2	4
3	(Italy) P Lorenzi	6	6
8	(Slovakia) M Kližan	4	6	6
(Montenegro) G Tošić	6	3	4
(Italy) S Galvani	5	4
(Spain) G Trujillo Soler	7	6
(France) B Paire	6	3	2
(Czech Republic) J Mertl	3	6	6
LL	(Portugal) Manuel Cavaco	1	4
2/WC	(Spain) D Gimeno Traver	6	6

Second round
5	(Romania) A Ungur	6	6
(Italy) F Cipolla	1	1
(Slovakia) P Červenák	6	1	4
3	(Italy) P Lorenzi	2	6	6
8	(Slovakia) M Kližan	7	6
(Spain) G Trujillo Soler	6^{3}	3
(Czech Republic) J Mertl	3	4
2/WC	(Spain) D Gimeno Traver	6	6

Quarterfinals
5	(Romania) A Ungur	6	6
3	(Italy) P Lorenzi	4	1
8	(Slovakia) M Kližan	4	0
2/WC	(Spain) D Gimeno Traver	6	6

Semifinals
5	(Romania) A Ungur	2	2
2/WC	(Spain) D Gimeno Traver	6	6
