= 2009 Carisap Tennis Cup – Doubles =

Doubles
- 2009 Carisap Tennis Cup

Final
- Champions: (Italy) Stefano Ianni (Argentina) Cristian Villagrán
- Runners-up: (Belgium) Niels Desein (France) Stéphane Robert
- Score: 7–6^{(7–3)}, 1–6, [10–6]

Events
Singles	Doubles
← 2008 ·	Carisap Tennis Cup	· 2010 →

Paolo Lorenzi and Júlio Silva were the defending champions. They didn't take part in these championships this year.
Stefano Ianni and Cristian Villagrán won in the final 7–6^{(7–3)}, 1–6, [10–6], against Niels Desein and Stéphane Robert.

== Seeds ==
1. (Italy) Leonardo Azzaro / (Italy) Marco Crugnola (first round)
2. (Spain) Carles Poch-Gradin / (Spain) Pablo Santos (semifinals)
3. (Czech Republic) Jaroslav Pospíšil / (France) Édouard Roger-Vasselin (quarterfinals, withdrew)
4. (Belgium) Niels Desein / (France) Stéphane Robert (final)

== Draw ==
=== Key ===
- Q = Qualifier
- WC = Wild card
- LL = Lucky loser
- Alt = Alternate
- SE = Special exempt
- PR = Protected ranking
- ITF = ITF entry
- JE = Junior exempt
- w/o = Walkover
- r = Retired
- d = Defaulted
- SR = Special ranking

=== Draw ===
First round
1	(Italy) L Azzaro (Italy) M Crugnola	6	2	[7]
(Brazil) T Bellucci (Brazil) F Ferreiro	2	6	[10]
WC	(Serbia) I Bozoljac (Serbia) N Perić	w/o
(Italy) S Ianni (Argentina) C Villagrán
3	(Czech Republic) J Pospíšil (France) É Roger-Vasselin	2	6	[10]
(Spain) G Olaso (Spain) A Ramos-Viñolas	6	2	[8]
(Austria) M Raditschnigg (Russia) D Sitak	7	6^{8}	[10]
(Italy) G Petrazzuolo (Italy) F Torresi	6^{4}	7	[8]
WC	(Italy) F Gianini (Italy) F Sgrignoli	4	3
(France) J Dasnières de Veigy (France) R Jouan	6	6
(Italy) A Biasella (Italy) A di Mauro	w/o
4	(Belgium) N Desein (France) S Robert
(Bosnia and Herzegovina) I Gorčić (Italy) C Grassi	6	6
ALT	(Argentina) P Konortoff (Italy) S Travaglia	4	4
(Italy) S Galvani (Italy) D Giorgini	5	6	[4]
2	(Spain) C Poch-Gradin (Spain) P Santos	7	0	[10]

Quarterfinals
(Brazil) T Bellucci (Brazil) F Ferreiro	6^{5}	0
(Italy) S Ianni (Argentina) C Villagrán	7	6
3	(Czech Republic) J Pospíšil (France) É Roger-Vasselin	w/o
(Austria) M Raditschnigg (Russia) D Sitak
(France) J Dasnières de Veigy (France) R Jouan	6^{2}	6^{3}
4	(Belgium) N Desein (France) S Robert	7	7
(Bosnia and Herzegovina) I Gorčić (Italy) C Grassi	4	4
2	(Spain) C Poch-Gradin (Spain) P Santos	6	6

Semifinals
(Italy) S Ianni (Argentina) C Villagrán	6	6^{3}	[10]
(Austria) M Raditschnigg (Russia) D Sitak	3	7	[0]
4	(Belgium) N Desein (France) S Robert	6	6
2	(Spain) C Poch-Gradin (Spain) P Santos	2	3

Finals
(Italy) S Ianni (Argentina) C Villagrán	7	1	[10]
4	(Belgium) N Desein (France) S Robert	6^{3}	6	[6]
