= 2009 Carisap Tennis Cup – Singles =

Singles
- 2009 Carisap Tennis Cup

Final
- Champion: (Italy) Fabio Fognini
- Runner-up: (Argentina) Cristian Villagrán
- Score: 6–7^{(5–7)}, 7–6^{(7–2)}, 6–0

Events
Singles	Doubles
← 2008 ·	Carisap Tennis Cup	· 2010 →

Máximo González didn't want to defend his 2008 title.
Fabio Fognini became the new champion. He won 6–7^{(5–7)}, 7–6^{(7–2)}, 6–0, against Cristian Villagrán.

== Seeds ==
1. (Italy) Fabio Fognini (champion)
2. (Spain) Óscar Hernández (second round, withdrew)
3. (Argentina) Diego Junqueira (second round, retired)
4. (Spain) Alberto Martín (first round)
5. (Chile) Nicolás Massú (first round)
6. (Serbia) Ilija Bozoljac (first round, retired)
7. (Brazil) Thomaz Bellucci (first round)
8. (Italy) Alessio di Mauro (first round)

== Draw ==
=== Key ===
- Q = Qualifier
- WC = Wild card
- LL = Lucky loser
- Alt = Alternate
- SE = Special exempt
- PR = Protected ranking
- ITF = ITF entry
- JE = Junior exempt
- w/o = Walkover
- r = Retired
- d = Defaulted
- SR = Special ranking

=== Final four ===
Semifinals
1	(Italy) Fabio Fognini	6	6
(Spain) Albert Ramos Viñolas	2	2
Q	(Argentina) Cristian Villagrán	2	6	6
WC	(Spain) Guillermo Olaso	6	2	3

Final
1	(Italy) Fabio Fognini	6^{5}	7	6
Q	(Argentina) Cristian Villagrán	7	6^{2}	0

=== Top half ===
First round
1	(Italy) F Fognini	6	6
(Spain) C Poch-Gradin	4	2
(Italy) S Galvani	4	2
(France) S Robert	6	6
(France) T Ascione	6	6
(Belgium) N Desein	3	4
(Spain) R Bautista Agut	4	6	6
5	(Chile) N Massú	6	4	1
4	(Spain) A Martín	4	7	5
(France) É Roger-Vasselin	6	6^{5}	7
(Argentina) S Decoud	7	7
(France) J Dasnières de Veigy	5	6^{0}
(Brazil) F Ferreiro	7	6
(France) R Jouan	6^{3}	3
(Spain) A Ramos Viñolas	2	2
(Serbia) I Bozoljac	6	0	r

Second round
1	(Italy) F Fognini	3	7	7
(France) S Robert	6	6^{5}	5
(France) T Ascione	7	6
(Spain) R Bautista Agut	6^{4}	4
(France) É Roger-Vasselin	5	6	3
(Argentina) S Decoud	7	4	6
(Brazil) F Ferreiro	5	3
(Spain) A Ramos Viñolas	7	6

Quarterfinals
1	(Italy) F Fognini	6	7
(France) T Ascione	2	5
(Argentina) S Decoud	7	3	1
(Spain) A Ramos Viñolas	6^{7}	6	6

Semifinals
1	(Italy) F Fognini	6	6
(Spain) A Ramos Viñolas	2	2

=== Bottom half ===
First round
7	(Brazil) T Bellucci	6^{6}	6^{6}
(Spain) P Santos	7	7
(Australia) M Matosevic	2	0
Q	(Slovakia) M Kližan	6	6
Q	(Argentina) C Villagrán	6	6
WC	(Italy) S Travaglia	4	3
(Italy) G Petrazzuolo	4	3
3	(Argentina) D Junqueira	6	6
8	(Italy) A di Mauro	3	6	6^{7}
(Czech Republic) J Pospíšil	6	1	7
Q	(Portugal) P Sousa	2	7	6^{8}
(Italy) M Crugnola	6	6^{5}	7
WC	(Spain) G Olaso	6	6
WC	(Italy) Giacomo Miccini	1	0
Q	(Spain) S Gutiérrez-Ferrol	6^{4}	0	r
2	(Spain) Ó Hernández	7	2

Second round
(Spain) P Santos	6^{4}	1
Q	(Slovakia) M Kližan	7	6
Q	(Argentina) C Villagrán	6	3
3	(Argentina) D Junqueira	4	1	r
(Czech Republic) J Pospíšil	6	6
(Italy) M Crugnola	4	3
WC	(Spain) G Olaso
2	(Spain) Ó Hernández	w/o

Quarterfinals
Q	(Slovakia) M Kližan	6^{3}	3
Q	(Argentina) C Villagrán	7	6
(Czech Republic) J Pospíšil	5	7	5
WC	(Spain) G Olaso	7	5	7

Semifinals
Q	(Argentina) C Villagrán	2	6	6
WC	(Spain) G Olaso	6	2	3
