= 2022 San Benedetto Tennis Cup – Singles =

Singles
- 2022 San Benedetto Tennis Cup

Final
- Champion: (Italy) Raúl Brancaccio
- Runner-up: (Italy) Andrea Vavassori
- Score: 6–1, 6–1

Events
Singles	Doubles
← 2019 ·	San Benedetto Tennis Cup	· 2023 →

Renzo Olivo was the defending champion but lost in the semifinals to Andrea Vavassori.

Raúl Brancaccio won the title after defeating Vavassori 6–1, 6–1 in the final.

== Seeds ==
1. (Italy) Andrea Pellegrino (quarterfinals)
2. (Italy) Luciano Darderi (semifinals)
3. (Italy) Francesco Passaro (second round)
4. (Argentina) Nicolás Kicker (first round, retired)
5. (Argentina) Andrea Collarini (second round, retired)
6. (Italy) Alessandro Giannessi (first round)
7. (Argentina) Renzo Olivo (semifinals)
8. (Brazil) Matheus Pucinelli de Almeida (second round)

== Draw ==
=== Key ===
- Q = Qualifier
- WC = Wild card
- LL = Lucky loser
- Alt = Alternate
- SE = Special exempt
- PR = Protected ranking
- ITF = ITF entry
- JE = Junior exempt
- w/o = Walkover
- r = Retired
- d = Defaulted
- SR = Special ranking

=== Finals ===
Semifinals
7	(Argentina) Renzo Olivo	3	6	3
(Italy) Andrea Vavassori	6	1	6
Q	(Italy) Raúl Brancaccio	6	3	6
2	(Italy) Luciano Darderi	2	6	2

Final
(Italy) Andrea Vavassori	1	1
Q	(Italy) Raúl Brancaccio	6	6

=== Top half ===
First round
1	(Italy) A Pellegrino	7^{8}	6
(Netherlands) J Sels	6^{6}	2
(Italy) S Caruso	0	5
LL	(Spain) Àlex Martí Pujolràs	6	7
WC	(Italy) M Bellucci	4	6	2^{r}
(Kazakhstan) T Skatov	6	2	2
Alt	A Vatutin	6	1	2
7	(Argentina) R Olivo	3	6	6
3	(Italy) F Passaro	6	2	6
Q	(Argentina) C Ugo Carabelli	3	6	4
(Czech Republic) J Forejtek	4	6	1
(Italy) A Vavassori	6	3	6
(Bosnia and Herzegovina) N Fatić	4	6	3
Q	(Brazil) P Boscardin Dias	6	3	6
(Brazil) T Seyboth Wild	7^{7}	2	6^{3}
5	(Argentina) A Collarini	6^{3}	6	7^{7}

Second round
1	(Italy) A Pellegrino	3	6	6
LL	(Spain) À Martí Pujolràs	6	4	2
(Kazakhstan) T Skatov	2	4
7	(Argentina) R Olivo	6	6
3	(Italy) F Passaro	0	3
(Italy) A Vavassori	6	6
Q	(Brazil) P Boscardin Dias	4	7^{7}	0
5	(Argentina) A Collarini	6	6^{3}	0^{r}

Quarterfinals
1	(Italy) A Pellegrino	1	6	2
7	(Argentina) R Olivo	6	4	6
(Italy) A Vavassori	6	6
Q	(Brazil) P Boscardin Dias	1	1

Semifinals
7	(Argentina) R Olivo	3	6	3
(Italy) A Vavassori	6	1	6

=== Bottom half ===
First round
8	(Brazil) M Pucinelli de Almeida	7	6
Q	(Portugal) J Domingues	5	3
WC	(Italy) F Maestrelli	2	0
Q	(Italy) R Brancaccio	6	6
WC	(Italy) G Ferrari	7^{7}	7^{7}
(Spain) N Sánchez Izquierdo	6^{4}	6^{4}
(Italy) M Arnaldi	6	3
4	(Argentina) N Kicker	3	0^{r}
6	(Italy) A Giannessi	3	4
Q	(Italy) G Fonio	6	6
Q	(Czech Republic) M Vrbenský	3	4
(Portugal) F Ferreira Silva	6	6
Alt	(Czech Republic) L Rosol	3	4
(Hungary) F Marozsán	6	6
LL	Andrey Chepelev	3	4
2	(Italy) L Darderi	6	6

Second round
8	(Brazil) M Pucinelli de Almeida	2	0
Q	(Italy) R Brancaccio	6	6
WC	(Italy) G Ferrari	6^{5}	1
(Italy) M Arnaldi	7^{7}	6
Q	(Italy) G Fonio	6	6
(Portugal) F Ferreira Silva	4	1
(Hungary) F Marozsán	6	3	2
2	(Italy) L Darderi	4	6	6

Quarterfinals
Q	(Italy) R Brancaccio	6	3	7
(Italy) M Arnaldi	1	6	5
Q	(Italy) G Fonio	4	1
2	(Italy) L Darderi	6	6

Semifinals
Q	(Italy) R Brancaccio	6	3	6
2	(Italy) L Darderi	2	6	2
