= 2022 San Benedetto Tennis Cup =

- Date: 25 – 31 July
- Edition: 16th
- Category: ATP Challenger Tour
- Surface: Clay
- Location: San Benedetto del Tronto, Italy

Champions

Singles
- (Italy) Raúl Brancaccio

Doubles
- (Ukraine) Vladyslav Manafov / (Ukraine) Oleg Prihodko
← 2019 ·	San Benedetto Tennis Cup	· 2023 →

The 2022 San Benedetto Tennis Cup was a professional tennis tournaments played on clay courts. It was the 16th edition of the tournament which was part of the 2022 ATP Challenger Tour. The event took place in San Benedetto del Tronto, Italy, from 25 to 31 July 2022.

== Singles entrants ==
=== Seeds ===
Country	Player	Rank^{1}	Seed
ITA	Andrea Pellegrino	174	1
ITA	Luciano Darderi	182	2
ITA	Francesco Passaro	187	3
ARG	Nicolás Kicker	188	4
ARG	Andrea Collarini	195	5
ITA	Alessandro Giannessi	206	6
ARG	Renzo Olivo	208	7
BRA	Matheus Pucinelli de Almeida	219	8

- ^{1} Rankings as of 18 July 2022.

=== Other entrants ===
The following players received wildcards into the singles main draw:

- (Italy) Mattia Bellucci
- (Italy) Gianmarco Ferrari
- (Italy) Francesco Maestrelli

The following players received entry into the singles main draw as alternates:

- (Italy) ~~Matteo Gigante~~
- (Czech Republic) Lukáš Rosol
- Alexey Vatutin

The following players received entry from the qualifying draw:

- (Brazil) Pedro Boscardin Dias
- (Italy) Raúl Brancaccio
- (Portugal) João Domingues
- (Italy) Giovanni Fonio
- (Argentina) Camilo Ugo Carabelli
- (Czech Republic) Michael Vrbenský

The following players received entry as lucky losers:

- Andrey Chepelev
- (Spain) Àlex Martí Pujolràs

== Champions ==
=== Singles ===
- (Italy) Raúl Brancaccio def. (Italy) Andrea Vavassori 6–1, 6–1.

=== Doubles ===
- (Ukraine) Vladyslav Manafov / (Ukraine) Oleg Prihodko def. (Hungary) Fábián Marozsán / (Czech Republic) Lukáš Rosol 4–6, 6–3, [12–10].
