= 2013 Banca dell'Adriatico Tennis Cup – Singles =

Singles
- 2013 Banca dell’Adriatico Tennis Cup

Final
- Champion: (Slovakia) Andrej Martin
- Runner-up: (Portugal) João Sousa
- Score: 6–4, 6–3

Events
Singles	Doubles
← 2012 ·	ATP Challenger San Benedetto	· 2014 →

Gianluca Naso was the defending champion but lost to David Guez in the first round.
Andrej Martin defeated top-seeded João Sousa 6–4, 6–3 in the final.

== Seeds ==
1. (Portugal) João Sousa (final)
2. (United States) Wayne Odesnik (first round)
3. (Austria) Andreas Haider-Maurer (quarterfinals)
4. (Serbia) Dušan Lajović (second round)
5. (Slovakia) Andrej Martin (champion)
6. (France) David Guez (second round)
7. (Chile) Jorge Aguilar (second round)
8. (Serbia) Boris Pašanski (first round)

== Draw ==
=== Key ===
- Q = Qualifier
- WC = Wild card
- LL = Lucky loser
- Alt = Alternate
- SE = Special exempt
- PR = Protected ranking
- ITF = ITF entry
- JE = Junior exempt
- w/o = Walkover
- r = Retired
- d = Defaulted
- SR = Special ranking

=== Finals ===
Semifinals
1	(Portugal) João Sousa	6	6
SE	(Italy) Thomas Fabbiano	1	3
5	(Slovakia) Andrej Martin	6	7^{7}
WC	(Italy) Stefano Travaglia	1	6^{2}

Final
1	(Portugal) João Sousa	4	3
5	(Slovakia) Andrej Martin	6	6

=== Top half ===
First round
1	(Portugal) J Sousa	6	3	6
(Portugal) P Sousa	3	6	2
(Belgium) A De Greef	6	6^{3}	6
(France) P-H Herbert	3	7^{7}	2
SE	(Spain) P Riba	3	6	6
(Italy) R Bellotti	6	3	4
(Italy) G Naso	7^{7}	4	2
6	(France) D Guez	6^{5}	6	6
3	(Austria) A Haider-Maurer	6	3
(France) J Eysseric	1	0^{r}
(Belgium) Y Mertens	6^{6}	1
(Austria) G Melzer	7^{8}	6
(Spain) J Samper-Montana	2	0
SE	(Italy) T Fabbiano	6	6
LL	(Venezuela) D Souto	5	3
7	(Chile) J Aguilar	7	6

Second round
1	(Portugal) J Sousa	6	6
(Belgium) A De Greef	4	4
SE	(Spain) P Riba	6	6
6	(France) D Guez	4	2
3	(Austria) A Haider-Maurer	6	3	6
(Austria) G Melzer	1	6	3
SE	(Italy) T Fabbiano	7	6
7	(Chile) J Aguilar	6^{4}	3

Quarterfinals
1	(Portugal) J Sousa	4
SE	(Spain) P Riba	1^{r}
3	(Austria) A Haider-Maurer	4	6	4
SE	(Italy) T Fabbiano	6	4	6

Semifinals
1	(Portugal) J Sousa	6	6
SE	(Italy) T Fabbiano	1	3

=== Bottom half ===
First round
5	(Slovakia) A Martin	6	4	6
WC	(Italy) P Starace	4	6	3
Q	(France) M Teixeira	7^{8}	6
(Bosnia and Herzegovina) A Šetkić	6^{6}	0
(Slovakia) J Kovalík	1	3
Q	(Italy) A Giannessi	6	6
(Japan) T Daniel	6	6^{5}	2
4	(Serbia) D Lajović	4	7^{7}	2
8	(Serbia) B Pašanski	4	4
WC	(Italy) S Travaglia	6	6
(France) N Renavand	2	2
Q	(Morocco) R El Amrani	6	6
Q	(Slovakia) N Gombos	0	6	7^{6}
WC	(Italy) D Giorgini	6	2	6^{1}
(Italy) A di Mauro	6	5	6
2	(United States) W Odesnik	2	7	4

Second round
5	(Slovakia) A Martin	6	0	6
(France) M Teixeira	4	6	4
Q	(Italy) A Giannessi	7^{7}	7
4	(Serbia) D Lajović	6^{3}	5
WC	(Italy) S Travaglia	6	6
Q	(Morocco) R El Amrani	4	4
Q	(Slovakia) N Gombos	6	6
(Italy) A di Mauro	2	4

Quarterfinals
5	(Slovakia) A Martin	6	6
Q	(Italy) A Giannessi	3	3
WC	(Italy) S Travaglia	6	2	6
Q	(Slovakia) N Gombos	4	6	4

Semifinals
5	(Slovakia) A Martin	6	7^{7}
WC	(Italy) S Travaglia	1	6^{2}
