= 2013 Banca dell'Adriatico Tennis Cup – Doubles =

Doubles
- 2013 Banca dell’Adriatico Tennis Cup

Final
- Champions: (France) Pierre-Hugues Herbert; (France) Maxime Teixeira
- Runners-up: (Italy) Alessandro Giannessi; (Portugal) João Sousa
- Score: 6–4, 6–3

Events
Singles	Doubles
← 2012 ·	ATP Challenger San Benedetto	· 2014 →

Brydan Klein and Dane Propoggia were the defending champions, but Klein chose not to compete. Propoggia chose to compete with Stefano Ianni but lost in the first round to Alessandro Motti and Matteo Volante.
Pierre-Hugues Herbert and Maxime Teixeira defeated Alessandro Giannessi and João Sousa 6–4, 6–3 in the final.

== Seeds ==
1. (Italy) Stefano Ianni / (Australia) Dane Propoggia (first round)
2. (France) Jonathan Eysseric / (France) Nicolas Renavand (withdrew)
3. (United States) Vahid Mirzadeh / (United States) Denis Zivkovic (quarterfinals)
4. (Chile) Jorge Aguilar / (Austria) Gerald Melzer (first round)

== Draw ==
=== Key ===
- Q = Qualifier
- WC = Wild card
- LL = Lucky loser
- Alt = Alternate
- SE = Special exempt
- PR = Protected ranking
- ITF = ITF entry
- JE = Junior exempt
- w/o = Walkover
- r = Retired
- d = Defaulted
- SR = Special ranking

First round

Quarterfinals

Semifinals

Final

1
- (Italy) S Ianni
- (Australia) D Propoggia
6
4
[7]

(Italy) A Motti
(Italy) Matteo Volante
3
6
[10]

(Italy) A Motti
(Italy) M Volante
6
6

WC
- (Italy) Edoardo Eremin
- (Italy) A Virgili
6
6

WC
- (Italy) E Eremin
- (Italy) A Virgili
4
2

- (Serbia) B Pašanski
- (Bosnia and Herzegovina) A Šetkić
4
1

(Italy) A Motti
(Italy) M Volante
5
4

4
- (Chile) J Aguilar
- (Austria) G Melzer
6
3
[7]

- (France) P-H Herbert
- (France) M Teixeira
7
6

- (France) P-H Herbert
- (France) M Teixeira
4
6
[10]

- (France) P-H Herbert
- (France) M Teixeira
4
6
[10]

- (Belgium) A De Greef
- (Belgium) Y Mertens
2
1

- (Slovakia) A Martin
- (Chile) H Podlipnik Castillo
6
2
[7]

- (Slovakia) A Martin
- (Chile) H Podlipnik Castillo
6
6

- (France) P-H Herbert
- (France) M Teixeira
6
6

- (Italy) A Giannessi
- (Portugal) J Sousa
6
6

- (Italy) A Giannessi
- (Portugal) J Sousa
4
3

- (Italy) T Fabbiano
- (Italy) G Naso
3
0

- (Italy) A Giannessi
- (Portugal) J Sousa
2
7
[10]

- (France) D Guez
- (Switzerland) M Lammer
4
4

3
- (United States) V Mirzadeh
- (United States) D Zivkovic
6
6^{2}
[7]

3
- (United States) V Mirzadeh
- (United States) D Zivkovic
6
6

- (Italy) A Giannessi
- (Portugal) J Sousa
3
6
[10]

- (Argentina) G Durán
- (Argentina) A Molteni
5
4

- (Italy) M Cecchinato
- (Italy) A di Mauro
6
1
[7]

WC
- (Italy) D Giorgini
- (Italy) S Travaglia
7
6

WC
- (Italy) D Giorgini
- (Italy) S Travaglia
3
4

WC
- (Italy) M Cecchinato
- (Italy) A di Mauro
6
7

WC
- (Italy) M Cecchinato
- (Italy) A di Mauro
6
6

Alt
(Italy) Andrea Attrice
(Italy) Pietro Rondoni
1
6^{0}
