= 2009 San Benedetto Tennis Cup =

2009 Carisap Tennis Cup
- Date: July 6 – July 12
- Edition: 5th
- Location: San Benedetto, Italy

Champions

Singles
- (Italy) Fabio Fognini

Doubles
- (Italy) Stefano Ianni / (Argentina) Cristian Villagrán
← 2008 ·	ATP Challenger San Benedetto	· 2010 →

The 2009 Carisap Tennis Cup was a professional tennis tournament played on outdoor red clay courts. This was the fifth edition of the tournament which was part of the 2009 ATP Challenger Tour. It took place in San Benedetto, Italy between 6 and 12 July 2009.

== Singles entrants ==
=== Seeds ===
Nationality	Player	Ranking*	Seeding
ITA	Fabio Fognini	66	1
ESP	Óscar Hernández	75	2
ARG	Diego Junqueira	85	3
ESP	Alberto Martín	95	4
CHI	Nicolás Massú	100	5
SRB	Ilija Bozoljac	114	6
BRA	Thomaz Bellucci	131	7
ITA	Alessio di Mauro	151	8

- Rankings are as of June 29, 2009.

=== Other entrants ===
The following players received wildcards into the singles main draw:

- (Italy) Fabio Fognini
- (Italy) Giacomo Miccini
- (Spain) Guillermo Olaso
- (Italy) Stefano Travaglia

The following players received entry from the qualifying draw:

- (Spain) Sergio Gutiérrez-Ferrol
- (Slovakia) Martin Kližan
- (Portugal) Pedro Sousa
- (Argentina) Cristian Villagrán

== Champions ==
=== Singles ===
(Italy) Fabio Fognini def. (Argentina) Cristian Villagrán, 6–7(5), 7–6(2), 6–0

=== Doubles ===
(Italy) Stefano Ianni / (Argentina) Cristian Villagrán def. (Belgium) Niels Desein / (France) Stéphane Robert, 7–6(3), 1–6, [10–6]
