= 2010 Carisap Tennis Cup – Doubles =

Doubles
- 2010 Carisap Tennis Cup

Final
- Champion: (Italy) Thomas Fabbiano (Spain) Gabriel Trujillo-Soler
- Runner-up: (Italy) Francesco Aldi (Italy) Daniele Giorgini
- Score: 7–6(4), 7–6(5)

Events
Singles	Doubles
← 2009 ·	Carisap Tennis Cup	· 2011 →

Stefano Ianni and Cristian Villagrán were the defending champions but choose not to compete in the 2010 Carisap Tennis Cup
Thomas Fabbiano and Gabriel Trujillo-Soler won the final against Francesco Aldi and Daniele Giorgini, 7–6(4), 7–6(5)

== Seeds ==
1. (Russia) Dmitri Sitak / (Montenegro) Goran Tošić (quarterfinals)
2. (Italy) Flavio Cipolla / (Italy) Alessio di Mauro (semifinals)
3. (Spain) Albert Ramos-Viñolas / (Argentina) Martín Vassallo Argüello (first round)
4. (Italy) Thomas Fabbiano / (Spain) Gabriel Trujillo-Soler (champions)

== Main draw ==
=== Key ===
- Q = Qualifier
- WC = Wild card
- LL = Lucky loser
- Alt = Alternate
- SE = Special exempt
- PR = Protected ranking
- ITF = ITF entry
- JE = Junior exempt
- w/o = Walkover
- r = Retired
- d = Defaulted
- SR = Special ranking

=== Draw ===
First round
1	(Russia) D Sitak (Montenegro) G Tošić	6	6
(Portugal) Manuel Cavaco (Portugal) P Sousa	2	1
(Spain) P Clar-Rosselló (Spain) S Gutiérrez-Ferrol	1	3
WC	(Italy) F Aldi (Italy) D Giorgini	6	6
3	(Spain) A Ramos-Viñolas (Argentina) M Vassallo Argüello	6	3	[2]
(Germany) M Bachinger (Romania) A Ungur	3	6	[10]
(Spain) D de Miguel (Spain) P Riba	6	6
WC	(Italy) Matteo Donati (Italy) Stefano Napolitano	3	1
WC	(Italy) C Brandi (Italy) Giacomo Miccini	6	3	[10]
(Italy) Matteo Baldi (Italy) P Lorenzi	3	6	[6]
WC	(Italy) Piercarlo Coccio (Italy) Nicolo Rosetti	3	1
4	(Italy) T Fabbiano (Spain) G Trujillo-Soler	6	6
(Italy) A Brizzi (Italy) Enrico Fioravante	4	2
(Slovakia) P Červenák (Slovakia) M Kližan	6	6
(Italy) S Galvani (Portugal) Gonçalo Pereira	2	3
2	(Italy) F Cipolla (Italy) A di Mauro	6	6

Quarterfinals
1	(Russia) D Sitak (Montenegro) G Tošić	2	2
WC	(Italy) F Aldi (Italy) D Giorgini	6	6
(Germany) M Bachinger (Romania) A Ungur	w/o
(Spain) D de Miguel (Spain) P Riba
WC	(Italy) C Brandi (Italy) G Miccini	1	1
4	(Italy) T Fabbiano (Spain) G Trujillo-Soler	6	6
(Slovakia) P Červenák (Slovakia) M Kližan	6	5	[6]
2	(Italy) F Cipolla (Italy) A di Mauro	1	7	[10]

Semifinals
WC	(Italy) F Aldi (Italy) D Giorgini	6	6
(Spain) D de Miguel (Spain) P Riba	2	4
4	(Italy) T Fabbiano (Spain) G Trujillo-Soler	6	5	[10]
2	(Italy) F Cipolla (Italy) A di Mauro	2	7	[6]

Finals
WC	(Italy) F Aldi (Italy) D Giorgini	6^{4}	6^{5}
4	(Italy) T Fabbiano (Spain) G Trujillo-Soler	7	7
