= 2010 Carisap Tennis Cup =

Tennis tournament in San Benedetto, Italy

- Date: July 5 – July 11
- Edition: 6th
- Location: San Benedetto, Italy

Champions

Singles
- (Argentina) Carlos Berlocq

Doubles
- (Italy) Thomas Fabbiano / (Spain) Gabriel Trujillo-Soler
| ← 2009 · | ATP Challenger San Benedetto | · 2011 → |

The 2010 Carisap Tennis Cup was a professional tennis tournament played on outdoor red clay courts. This was the sixth edition of the tournament which is part of the 2010 ATP Challenger Tour. It took place in San Benedetto, Italy between 5 July and 11 July 2010.

== Singles main draw entrants ==
=== Seeds ===
| Nationality | Player | Ranking* | Seeding |
|---|---|---|---|
| ESP | Pere Riba | 78 | 1 |
| ESP | Daniel Gimeno-Traver | 91 | 2 |
| ITA | Paolo Lorenzi | 96 | 3 |
| ESP | Albert Ramos-Viñolas | 140 | 4 |
| ROU | Adrian Ungur | 146 | 5 |
| ARG | Carlos Berlocq | 155 | 6 |
| CZE | Dušan Lojda | 195 | 7 |
| SVK | Martin Kližan | 205 | 8 |

- Rankings are as of June 21, 2010.

=== Other entrants ===
The following players received wildcards into the singles main draw:

- (Italy) Thomas Fabbiano
- (Italy) Enrico Fioravante
- (Spain) Daniel Gimeno-Traver
- (Italy) Giacomo Miccini

The following players received entry from the qualifying draw:

- (Portugal) Manuel Cavaco (as a Lucky Loser)
- (Portugal) Gonçalo Pereira
- (Slovenia) Janez Semrajc
- (Russia) Dmitri Sitak
- (Portugal) Pedro Sousa

== Champions ==
=== Singles ===
(Argentina) Carlos Berlocq def. (Spain) Daniel Gimeno-Traver 6–3, 4–6, 6–4

=== Doubles ===
(Italy) Thomas Fabbiano / (Spain) Gabriel Trujillo-Soler def. (Italy) Francesco Aldi / (Italy) Daniele Giorgini, 7–6(4), 7–6(5).
