= 2022 San Benedetto Tennis Cup – Doubles =

Doubles
- 2022 San Benedetto Tennis Cup

Final
- Champions: (Ukraine) Vladyslav Manafov (Ukraine) Oleg Prihodko
- Runners-up: (Hungary) Fábián Marozsán (Czech Republic) Lukáš Rosol
- Score: 4–6, 6–3, [12–10]

Events
Singles	Doubles
← 2019 ·	San Benedetto Tennis Cup	· 2023 →

Ivan and Matej Sabanov were the defending champions but lost in the quarterfinals to Matteo Arnaldi and Francesco Passaro.

Vladyslav Manafov and Oleg Prihodko won the title after defeating Fábián Marozsán and Lukáš Rosol 4–6, 6–3, [12–10] in the final.

== Seeds ==
1. (Serbia) Ivan Sabanov / (Serbia) Matej Sabanov (quarterfinals)
2. (Jamaica) Dustin Brown / (Italy) Andrea Vavassori (quarterfinals)
3. (Ukraine) Vladyslav Manafov / (Ukraine) Oleg Prihodko (champions)
4. (Italy) Raúl Brancaccio / (Brazil) Oscar José Gutierrez (quarterfinals)

== Draw ==
=== Key ===
- Q = Qualifier
- WC = Wild card
- LL = Lucky loser
- Alt = Alternate
- ITF = ITF entry
- PR = Protected ranking
- SR = Special ranking
- SE = Special exempt
- JE = Junior exempt
- JR = Junior Accelerator Programme entrant
- CO = College Accelerator Programme entrant
- NG = Next Gen Accelerator Program entrant
- w/o = Walkover
- r = Retired
- d = Defaulted

First round
1	(Serbia) I Sabanov (Serbia) M Sabanov	3	6	[10]
(Italy) Francesco Vilardo (Italy) Samuel Vincent Ruggeri	6	2	[6]
(Italy) M Arnaldi (Italy) F Passaro	4	6	[10]
Andrey Chepelev (Romania) A Jecan	6	3	[8]
(Hungary) F Marozsán (Czech Republic) L Rosol	6	4	[10]
WC	(Italy) F Arnaboldi (Italy) G Ferrari	3	6	[3]
(Italy) Davide Pozzi (Italy) Augusto Virgili	5	7^{7}	[12]
WC	(Italy) Riccardo Balzerani (Italy) Tommaso Compagnucci	7	6^{5}	[10]
(Switzerland) R Bertola (Czech Republic) M Vrbenský	3	6^{3}
3	(Ukraine) V Manafov (Ukraine) O Prihodko	6	7^{7}
(Brazil) T Seyboth Wild (Argentina) C Ugo Carabelli	5	6^{4}
(Brazil) P Boscardin Dias (Portugal) J Domingues	7	7^{7}
(Argentina) Juan Ignacio Galarza (Slovenia) T Lipovšek Puches	5	5
2	(Jamaica) D Brown (Italy) A Vavassori	7	7

Quarterfinals
1	(Serbia) I Sabanov (Serbia) M Sabanov	3	2
(Italy) M Arnaldi (Italy) F Passaro	6	6
4	(Italy) R Brancaccio (Brazil) Oscar José Gutierrez	1	4
(Hungary) F Marozsán (Czech Republic) L Rosol	6	6
(Italy) D Pozzi (Italy) A Virgili	3	2
3	(Ukraine) V Manafov (Ukraine) O Prihodko	6	6
(Brazil) P Boscardin Dias (Portugal) J Domingues	7^{7}	6
2	(Jamaica) D Brown (Italy) A Vavassori	6^{4}	4

Semifinals
(Italy) M Arnaldi (Italy) F Passaro	7^{7}	6^{6}	[7]
(Hungary) F Marozsán (Czech Republic) L Rosol	6^{2}	7^{8}	[10]
3	(Ukraine) V Manafov (Ukraine) O Prihodko	6	4	[10]
(Brazil) P Boscardin Dias (Portugal) J Domingues	3	6	[8]

Final
(Hungary) F Marozsán (Czech Republic) L Rosol	6	3	[10]
3	(Ukraine) V Manafov (Ukraine) O Prihodko	4	6	[12]
