= 2014 San Benedetto Tennis Cup – Singles =

Singles
- 2014 San Benedetto Tennis Cup

Final
- Champion: (Bosnia and Herzegovina) Damir Džumhur
- Runner-up: (Austria) Andreas Haider-Maurer
- Score: 6–3, 6–3

Events
Singles	Doubles
← 2013 ·	San Benedetto Tennis Cup	· 2015 →

Andrej Martin was the defending champion, but lost in the semifinals to Andreas Haider-Maurer.
Damir Džumhur won the title, beating Haider-Maurer in the final, 6–3, 6–3.

== Seeds ==
1. (Austria) Andreas Haider-Maurer (final)
2. (Argentina) Máximo González (quarterfinals)
3. (Italy) Filippo Volandri (first round)
4. (Bosnia and Herzegovina) Damir Džumhur (champion)
5. (Slovakia) Norbert Gombos (semifinals)
6. (Italy) Simone Bolelli (first round, withdrew before the match)
7. (Slovenia) Aljaž Bedene (withdrew)
8. (Slovakia) Andrej Martin (semifinals)

== Draw ==
=== Key ===
- Q = Qualifier
- WC = Wild card
- LL = Lucky loser
- Alt = Alternate
- SE = Special exempt
- PR = Protected ranking
- ITF = ITF entry
- JE = Junior exempt
- w/o = Walkover
- r = Retired
- d = Defaulted
- SR = Special ranking

=== Finals ===
Semifinals
1	(Austria) Andreas Haider-Maurer	7^{7}	5	6
8	(Slovakia) Andrej Martin	6^{5}	7	4
4	(Bosnia and Herzegovina) Damir Džumhur	6	6
5	(Slovakia) Norbert Gombos	4	2

Final
1	(Austria) Andreas Haider-Maurer	3	3
4	(Bosnia and Herzegovina) Damir Džumhur	6	6

=== Top half ===
First round
1	(Austria) A Haider-Maurer	6	6
(Egypt) M Safwat	3	2
WC	(Italy) A Giannessi	6	6
(Spain) G Granollers	1	1
(Croatia) T Androić	4	4
(France) A Michon	6	6
(Chile) H Podlipnik-Castillo	w/o
6/WC	(Italy) S Bolelli
3/WC	(Italy) F Volandri	4	2
(Spain) R Ramírez Hidalgo	6	6
Q	(France) E Couacaud	5	7^{7}	3
(Czech Republic) J Pospíšil	7	6^{4}	6
(Spain) J Samper-Montaña	5	5
Q	(Bosnia and Herzegovina) T Brkić	7	7
(Croatia) K Mesaroš	0	3
8	(Slovakia) A Martin	6	6

Second round
1	(Austria) A Haider-Maurer	6	6
WC	(Italy) A Giannessi	1	3
(France) A Michon	4	6	6
(Chile) H Podlipnik-Castillo	6	1	4
(Spain) R Ramírez Hidalgo	7^{7}	7
(Czech Republic) J Pospíšil	6^{3}	5
Q	(Bosnia and Herzegovina) T Brkić	4	4
8	(Slovakia) A Martin	6	6

Quarterfinals
1	(Austria) A Haider-Maurer	6	6
(France) A Michon	1	2
(Spain) R Ramírez Hidalgo	2	1
8	(Slovakia) A Martin	6	6

Semifinals
1	(Austria) A Haider-Maurer	7^{7}	5	6
8	(Slovakia) A Martin	6^{5}	7	4

=== Bottom half ===
First round
LL	(Egypt) S Sabry	3	4
(Spain) R Carballés Baena	6	6
(Croatia) B Ćorić	6	6
Q	(Peru) D Beretta	4	1
(Hungary) M Fucsovics	6^{3}	6	6
(Argentina) A Molteni	7^{7}	0	3
WC	(Italy) G Quinzi	6	4	1
4	(Bosnia and Herzegovina) D Džumhur	4	6	6
5	(Slovakia) N Gombos	6	6
Alt	(Italy) G Naso	3	3
(Italy) S Travaglia	4	3
(France) L Pouille	6	6
(Italy) P Starace	6	2
(Australia) J Kubler	2	0^{r}
Q	(Ukraine) A Smirnov	1	0
2	(Argentina) M González	6	6

Second round
(Spain) R Carballés Baena	6^{5}	6	3
(Croatia) B Ćorić	7^{7}	4	6
(Hungary) M Fucsovics	6^{1}	4
4	(Bosnia and Herzegovina) D Džumhur	7^{7}	6
5	(Slovakia) N Gombos	w/o
(France) L Pouille
(Italy) P Starace	2	4
2	(Argentina) M González	6	6

Quarterfinals
(Croatia) B Ćorić	2	5
4	(Bosnia and Herzegovina) D Džumhur	6	7
5	(Slovakia) N Gombos	6	5	6
2	(Argentina) M González	3	7	4

Semifinals
4	(Bosnia and Herzegovina) D Džumhur	6	6
5	(Slovakia) N Gombos	4	2
