= 2013 Banca dell'Adriatico Tennis Cup =

2013 Banca dell’Adriatico Tennis Cup
- Date: 8–14 July
- Edition: 9th
- Surface: Clay
- Location: San Benedetto del Tronto, Italy

Champions

Singles
- (Slovakia) Andrej Martin

Doubles
- (France) Pierre-Hugues Herbert / (France) Maxime Teixeira
← 2012 ·	ATP Challenger San Benedetto	· 2014 →

The 2013 Banca dell’Adriatico Tennis Cup was a professional tennis tournament played on clay courts. It was the ninth edition of the tournament which was part of the 2013 ATP Challenger Tour. It took place in San Benedetto del Tronto, Italy between 8 and 14 July 2013.

== Singles main draw entrants ==
=== Seeds ===
Country	Player	Rank^{1}	Seed
POR	João Sousa	106	1
USA	Wayne Odesnik	107	2
AUT	Andreas Haider-Maurer	108	3
SRB	Dušan Lajović	114	4
SVK	Andrej Martin	149	5
FRA	David Guez	176	6
CHI	Jorge Aguilar	186	7
SRB	Boris Pašanski	194	8

- ^{1} Rankings are as of June 24, 2013.

=== Other entrants ===
The following players received wildcards into the singles main draw:

- (Italy) Daniele Giorgini
- (Italy) Potito Starace
- (Italy) Stefano Travaglia

The following players received entry as special exempt:

- (Spain) Pere Riba
- (Italy) Thomas Fabbiano

The following players received entry from the qualifying draw:

- (Morocco) Reda El Amrani
- (Italy) Alessandro Giannessi
- (Slovakia) Norbert Gombos
- (France) Maxime Teixeira

The following player received entry as lucky loser:

- (Venezuela) David Souto

== Champions ==
=== Singles ===
- (Slovakia) Andrej Martin def. (Portugal) João Sousa 6–4, 6–3

=== Doubles ===
- (France) Pierre-Hugues Herbert / (France) Maxime Teixeira def. (Italy) Alessandro Giannessi / (Portugal) João Sousa 6–4, 6–3
