= 2023 San Benedetto Tennis Cup – Singles =

Singles
- 2023 San Benedetto Tennis Cup

Final
- Champion: (France) Benoît Paire
- Runner-up: (France) Richard Gasquet
- Score: 4–6, 6–1, 6–1

Events
Singles	Doubles
- San Benedetto Tennis Cup

Raúl Brancaccio was the defending champion but lost in the first round to Hernán Casanova.

Benoît Paire won the title after defeating Richard Gasquet 4–6, 6–1, 6–1 in the final.

== Seeds ==
1. (France) Richard Gasquet (final)
2. (Spain) Albert Ramos Viñolas (second round)
3. (Argentina) Facundo Díaz Acosta (withdrew)
4. (Argentina) Thiago Agustín Tirante (second round)
5. (Chile) Tomás Barrios Vera (withdrew)
6. (Italy) Raúl Brancaccio (first round)
7. (Chile) Alejandro Tabilo (semifinals)
8. (France) Benoît Paire (champion)

== Draw ==
Key

- Q = Qualifier
- WC = Wild card
- LL = Lucky loser
- Alt = Alternate
- ITF = ITF entry
- PR = Protected ranking
- SR = Special ranking
- SE = Special exempt
- JE = Junior exempt
- JR = Junior Accelerator Programme entrant
- CO = College Accelerator Programme entrant
- NG = Next Gen Accelerator Program entrant
- w/o = Walkover
- r = Retired
- d = Defaulted

=== Finals ===
Semifinals
1/WC	(France) Richard Gasquet	6	6
Q	(Spain) Daniel Rincón	4	1
7	(Chile) Alejandro Tabilo	4	1
8	(France) Benoît Paire	6	6

Final
1/WC	(France) Richard Gasquet	6	1	1
8	(France) Benoît Paire	4	6	6

=== Top half ===
First round
1/WC	(France) R Gasquet	7	6
Q	(Italy) Marcello Serafini	5	2
(Australia) M Polmans	6	3	1
(Italy) L Nardi	4	6	6
WC	(Italy) G Ferrari	3	1
(Italy) F Cobolli	6	6
Alt	(Argentina) H Casanova	7^{7}	6
6	(Italy) R Brancaccio	6^{0}	2
4	(Argentina) TA Tirante	6	6
WC	(Italy) Peter Buldorini	2	2
Q	(Spain) D Rincón	6	4
(Switzerland) L Riedi	4	3^{r}
(Belgium) M Geerts	4	6	6
(Italy) M Gigante	6	4	4
(Bulgaria) D Kuzmanov	6	6
Q	(Kazakhstan) D Popko	2	3

Second round
1/WC	(France) R Gasquet	6	6
(Italy) L Nardi	3	4
(Italy) F Cobolli	6	6
Alt	(Argentina) H Casanova	3	4
4	(Argentina) TA Tirante	7	5	2
Q	(Spain) D Rincón	5	7	6
(Belgium) M Geerts	3	6	3
(Bulgaria) D Kuzmanov	6	1	6

Quarterfinals
1/WC	(France) R Gasquet	4	6	6
(Italy) F Cobolli	6	3	1
Q	(Spain) D Rincón	6^{6}	6	6
(Bulgaria) D Kuzmanov	7^{8}	1	4

Semifinals
1/WC	(France) R Gasquet	6	6
Q	(Spain) D Rincón	4	1

=== Bottom half ===
First round
7	(Chile) A Tabilo	7	6
(Argentina) GA Olivieri	5	3
LL	(Italy) G Piraino	6^{3}	4
(Lithuania) R Berankis	7^{7}	6
(Italy) A Pellegrino	6^{3}	2
LL	(Italy) F Forti	7^{7}	6
(Belgium) K Coppejans	6	6
LL	(Italy) F Arnaboldi	0	2
8	(France) B Paire	6	5	7
(Italy) F Maestrelli	3	7	5
Q	(Italy) Alexander Weis	4	1^{r}
Q	(Spain) C Sánchez Jover	6	4
LL	(Italy) Facundo Juárez	1	3
(Italy) L Darderi	6	6
Q	(Italy) J Ocleppo	5	4
2	(Spain) A Ramos Viñolas	7	6

Second round
7	(Chile) A Tabilo	6	7^{7}
(Lithuania) R Berankis	1	6^{5}
LL	(Italy) F Forti	5	6	2
(Belgium) K Coppejans	7	3	6
8	(France) B Paire	6	6
Q	(Spain) C Sánchez Jover	2	4
(Italy) L Darderi	6	4	6
2	(Spain) A Ramos Viñolas	2	6	4

Quarterfinals
7	(Chile) A Tabilo	3	7^{7}	7^{8}
(Belgium) K Coppejans	6	6^{4}	6^{6}
8	(France) B Paire	6	7^{8}
(Italy) L Darderi	4	6^{6}

Semifinals
7	(Chile) A Tabilo	4	1
8	(France) B Paire	6	6
