= 2014 San Benedetto Tennis Cup =

- Date: 7 – 13 July
- Edition: 10th
- Category: ATP Challenger Tour
- Prize money: €35,000+H
- Surface: Clay
- Location: San Benedetto del Tronto, Italy

Champions

Singles
- (Bosnia and Herzegovina) Damir Džumhur

Doubles
- (Italy) Daniele Giorgini / (Italy) Potito Starace
← 2013 ·	San Benedetto Tennis Cup	· 2015 →

The 2014 San Benedetto Tennis Cup is a professional tennis tournaments played on clay courts. It is the 10th edition of the tournament which is part of the 2014 ATP Challenger Tour, offering a total of €35,000+H in prize money. The event takes place in San Benedetto del Tronto, Italy, on 7 July to 13 July 2014.

== Singles entrants ==
=== Seeds ===
Country	Player	Rank^{1}	Seed
AUT	Andreas Haider-Maurer	95	1
ARG	Máximo González	116	2
ITA	Filippo Volandri	117	3
BIH	Damir Džumhur	123	4
SVK	Norbert Gombos	128	5
ITA	Simone Bolelli	132	6
SLO	Aljaž Bedene	140	7
SVK	Andrej Martin	162	8

- ^{1} Rankings as of 23 June 2014

=== Other entrants ===
The following players received wildcards into the singles main draw:

- (Italy) Simone Bolelli
- (Italy) Alessandro Giannessi
- (Italy) Gianluigi Quinzi
- (Italy) Filippo Volandri

The following players entered as an alternate into the singles main draw:

- (Italy) Gianluca Naso

The following players received entry from the qualifying draw:

- (Peru) Duilio Beretta
- (Bosnia and Herzegovina) Tomislav Brkić
- (France) Enzo Couacaud
- (Ukraine) Artem Smirnov

== Doubles main draw entrants ==
=== Seeds ===
Country	Player	Country	Player	Rank^{1}	Seed
ARG	Guillermo Durán	ARG	Eduardo Schwank	222	1
ITA	Alessandro Giannessi	ARG	Máximo González	302	2
VEN	Roberto Maytín	ARG	Andrés Molteni	334	3
SVK	Andrej Martin	CZE	Jaroslav Pospíšil	431	4

- ^{1} Rankings as of June 24, 2014.

== Champions ==
=== Singles ===
- (Bosnia and Herzegovina) Damir Džumhur def. (Austria) Andreas Haider-Maurer 6–3, 6–3

=== Doubles ===
- (Italy) Daniele Giorgini / (Italy) Potito Starace def. (Bolivia) Hugo Dellien / (Peru) Sergio Galdós 6–3, 6–7^{(3–7)}, [10–5]
