= 2023 San Benedetto Tennis Cup – Doubles =

Doubles
- 2023 San Benedetto Tennis Cup

Final
- Champions: (Brazil) Fernando Romboli (Brazil) Marcelo Zormann
- Runners-up: (Ecuador) Diego Hidalgo (Colombia) Cristian Rodríguez
- Score: 6–3, 6–4

Events
Singles	Doubles
← 2022 ·	San Benedetto Tennis Cup	· 2024 →

Vladyslav Manafov and Oleg Prihodko were the defending champions but chose not to defend their title.

Fernando Romboli and Marcelo Zormann won the title after defeating Diego Hidalgo and Cristian Rodríguez 6–3, 6–4 in the final.

== Seeds ==
1. (Ecuador) Diego Hidalgo / (Colombia) Cristian Rodríguez (final)
2. (Bolivia) Boris Arias / (Bolivia) Federico Zeballos (semifinals)
3. (Italy) Marco Bortolotti / (Italy) Andrea Pellegrino (semifinals)
4. (Belgium) Michael Geerts / (Mexico) Hans Hach Verdugo (first round)

== Draw ==
=== Key ===
- Q = Qualifier
- WC = Wild card
- LL = Lucky loser
- Alt = Alternate
- ITF = ITF entry
- PR = Protected ranking
- SR = Special ranking
- SE = Special exempt
- JE = Junior exempt
- JR = Junior Accelerator Programme entrant
- CO = College Accelerator Programme entrant
- NG = Next Gen Accelerator Program entrant
- w/o = Walkover
- r = Retired
- d = Defaulted

First round
PR	(Ukraine) V Uzhylovskyi (Netherlands) M Vervoort	4	6	[10]
WC	(Italy) Peter Buldorini (Italy) Tommaso Compagnucci	6	3	[5]
3	(Italy) M Bortolotti (Italy) A Pellegrino	6	6
WC	(Italy) Riccardo Balzerani (Italy) Andrea Meduri	2	4
(United Kingdom) J Paris (United Kingdom) M Willis	6^{5}	6^{5}
(Italy) Facundo Juárez (Argentina) G Villanueva	7^{7}	7^{7}
(Italy) L Darderi (France) J Eysseric	4	6	[10]
(Argentina) H Casanova (Spain) C Sánchez Jover	6	1	[4]
(Brazil) F Romboli (Brazil) M Zormann	3	6	[10]
4	(Belgium) M Geerts (Mexico) H Hach Verdugo	6	4	[5]
(Croatia) Z Babić (Bulgaria) A Donski	5	6	[10]
(Italy) Luca Potenza (Italy) Augusto Virgili	7	2	[2]
(Switzerland) L Riedi (Spain) D Rincón
2	(Bolivia) B Arias (Bolivia) F Zeballos	w/o

Quarterfinals
1	(Ecuador) D Hidalgo (Colombia) C Rodríguez	6	6
PR	(Ukraine) V Uzhylovskyi (Netherlands) M Vervoort	2	1
3	(Italy) M Bortolotti (Italy) A Pellegrino	6	3	[10]
(Italy) F Juárez (Argentina) G Villanueva	4	6	[8]
(Italy) L Darderi (France) J Eysseric	6	4	[7]
(Brazil) F Romboli (Brazil) M Zormann	3	6	[10]
(Croatia) Z Babić (Bulgaria) A Donski	4	2
2	(Bolivia) B Arias (Bolivia) F Zeballos	6	6

Semifinals
1	(Ecuador) D Hidalgo (Colombia) C Rodríguez	7^{7}	7
3	(Italy) M Bortolotti (Italy) A Pellegrino	6^{4}	5
(Brazil) F Romboli (Brazil) M Zormann	7^{7}	7
2	(Bolivia) B Arias (Bolivia) F Zeballos	6^{5}	5

Final
1	(Ecuador) D Hidalgo (Colombia) C Rodríguez	3	4
(Brazil) F Romboli (Brazil) M Zormann	6	6
