= 2023 San Benedetto Tennis Cup =

- Date: 10 – 16 July
- Edition: 17th
- Category: ATP Challenger Tour
- Surface: Clay
- Location: San Benedetto del Tronto, Italy

Champions

Singles
- (France) Benoît Paire

Doubles
- (Brazil) Fernando Romboli / (Brazil) Marcelo Zormann
- San Benedetto Tennis Cup

The 2023 San Benedetto Tennis Cup was a professional tennis tournaments played on clay courts. It was the 17th edition of the tournament which was part of the 2023 ATP Challenger Tour. The event took place in San Benedetto del Tronto, Italy, from 10 to 16 July 2023.

== Singles entrants ==
=== Seeds ===
Country	Player	Rank^{1}	Seed
FRA	Richard Gasquet	51	1
ESP	Albert Ramos Viñolas	76	2
~~ARG~~	~~Facundo Díaz Acosta~~	~~115~~	~~3~~
ARG	Thiago Agustín Tirante	132	4
~~CHI~~	~~Tomás Barrios Vera~~	~~133~~	~~5~~
ITA	Raúl Brancaccio	135	6
CHI	Alejandro Tabilo	145	7
FRA	Benoît Paire	147	8

- ^{1} Rankings as of 3 July 2023.

=== Other entrants ===
The following players received wildcards into the singles main draw:

- (Italy) Peter Buldorini
- (Italy) Gianmarco Ferrari
- (France) Richard Gasquet

The following players received entry into the singles main draw as alternates:

- (Italy) ~~Salvatore Caruso~~
- (Argentina) Hernán Casanova
- (Italy) ~~Alessandro Giannessi~~

The following players received entry from the qualifying draw:

- (Italy) Julian Ocleppo
- (Kazakhstan) Dmitry Popko
- (Spain) Daniel Rincón
- (Spain) Carlos Sánchez Jover
- (Italy) Marcello Serafini
- (Italy) Alexander Weis

The following players received entry as lucky losers:

- (Italy) Federico Arnaboldi
- (Italy) Francesco Forti
- (Italy) Facundo Juárez
- (Italy) Gabriele Piraino

== Champions ==
=== Singles ===
- (France) Benoît Paire def. (France) Richard Gasquet 4–6, 6–1, 6–1.

=== Doubles ===
- (Brazil) Fernando Romboli / (Brazil) Marcelo Zormann def. (Ecuador) Diego Hidalgo / (Colombia) Cristian Rodríguez 6–3, 6–4.
