= 2014 San Benedetto Tennis Cup – Doubles =

Doubles
- 2014 San Benedetto Tennis Cup

Final
- Champions: (Italy) Daniele Giorgini (Italy) Potito Starace
- Runners-up: (Bolivia) Hugo Dellien (Peru) Sergio Galdós
- Score: 6–3, 6–7^{(3–7)}, [10–5]

Events
Singles	Doubles
← 2013 ·	San Benedetto Tennis Cup	· 2015 →

Pierre-Hugues Herbert and Maxime Teixeira were the defending champion but they did not participate that year.
Daniele Giorgini and Potito Starace won the title, defeating Hugo Dellien and Sergio Galdós in the final, 6–3, 6–7^{(3–7)}, [10–5].

== Seeds ==
1. (Argentina) Guillermo Durán / (Argentina) Eduardo Schwank (quarterfinals)
2. (Italy) Alessandro Giannessi / (Argentina) Máximo González (first round)
3. (Venezuela) Roberto Maytín / (Argentina) Andrés Molteni (first round)
4. (Slovakia) Andrej Martin / (Czech Republic) Jaroslav Pospíšil (quarterfinals)

== Draw ==
=== Key ===
- Q = Qualifier
- WC = Wild card
- LL = Lucky loser
- Alt = Alternate
- SE = Special exempt
- PR = Protected ranking
- ITF = ITF entry
- JE = Junior exempt
- w/o = Walkover
- r = Retired
- d = Defaulted
- SR = Special ranking

=== Draw ===
First round
1	(Argentina) G Durán (Argentina) E Schwank	w/o
(France) E Couacaud (France) L Pouille
(Peru) D Beretta (Hungary) M Fucsovics	4	4
(Italy) D Giorgini (Italy) P Starace	6	6
3	(Venezuela) R Maytín (Argentina) A Molteni	4	6^{5}
(Bosnia and Herzegovina) T Brkić (Bosnia and Herzegovina) D Džumhur	6	7
(Italy) Giorgio Portaluri (Ukraine) A Smirnov	6^{4}	3
(Italy) W Trusendi (Italy) A Virgili	7	6
(Colombia) C Rodríguez (Egypt) S Sabry	4	6	[5]
(Croatia) T Androić (Croatia) B Ćorić	6	3	[10]
(Italy) A Motti (Italy) S Travaglia	3	1
4	(Slovakia) A Martin (Czech Republic) J Pospíšil	6	6
(Chile) H Podlipnik-Castillo (Egypt) M Safwat	6	6
(Italy) A di Mauro (Italy) G Naso	3	1
(Bolivia) H Dellien (Peru) S Galdós	6	6
2	(Italy) A Giannessi (Argentina) M González	2	2

Quarterfinals
1	(Argentina) G Durán (Argentina) E Schwank	2	2
(Italy) D Giorgini (Italy) P Starace	6	6
(Bosnia and Herzegovina) T Brkić (Bosnia and Herzegovina) D Džumhur	6	2	[7]
(Italy) W Trusendi (Italy) A Virgili	4	6	[10]
(Croatia) T Androić (Croatia) B Ćorić	6	6
4	(Slovakia) A Martin (Czech Republic) J Pospíšil	2	0
(Chile) H Podlipnik-Castillo (Egypt) M Safwat	2	3
(Bolivia) H Dellien (Peru) S Galdós	6	6

Semifinals
(Italy) D Giorgini (Italy) P Starace	7	6
(Italy) W Trusendi (Italy) A Virgili	5	1
(Croatia) T Androić (Croatia) B Ćorić	4	2
(Bolivia) H Dellien (Peru) S Galdós	6	6

Final
(Italy) D Giorgini (Italy) P Starace	6	6^{3}	[10]
(Bolivia) H Dellien (Peru) S Galdós	3	7^{7}	[5]
