= Niels Desein =

Belgian tennis player

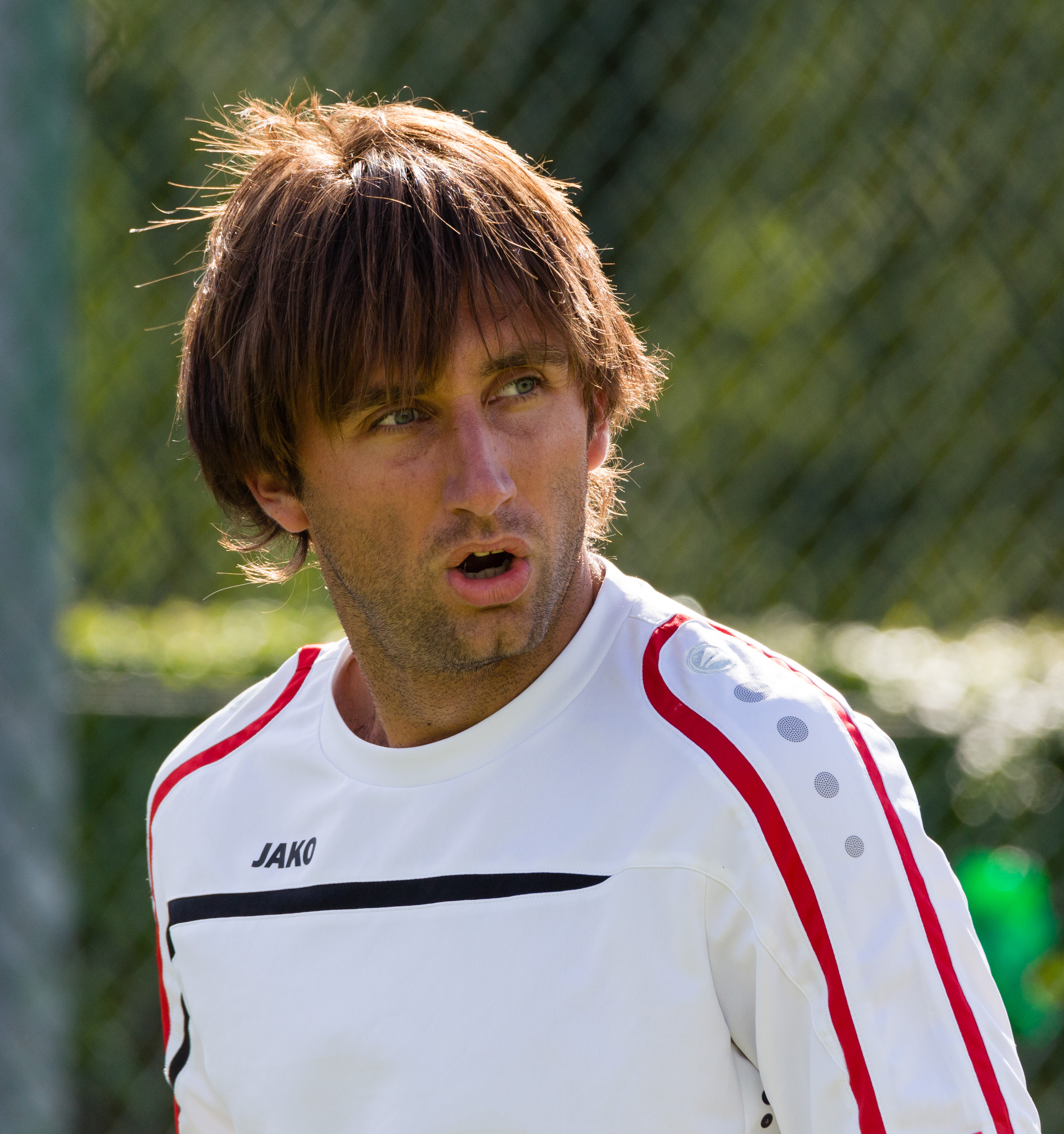
- Country (sports): Belgium
- Residence: Ostend, Belgium
- Born: 9 June 1987 (age 38) Ghent, Belgium
- Height: 1.88 m (6 ft 2 in)
- Turned pro: 2007
- Plays: Right-handed (two-handed backhand)
- Prize money: US$414,040

Singles
- Career record: 0–3
- Career titles: 0
- Highest ranking: No. 154 (2 March 2015)

Grand Slam singles results
- Australian Open: Q3 (2016)
- French Open: Q2 (2014)
- Wimbledon: Q1 (2010, 2013, 2014, 2015)
- US Open: 1R (2014)

Doubles
- Career record: 1–0
- Career titles: 0
- Highest ranking: No. 182 (3 August 2009)

Team competitions
- Davis Cup: F (2015)

Niels Desein (born 9 June 1987) is a Belgian tennis player playing on the ATP Challenger Tour. He was born in Ghent, Belgium, and currently resides in Wondelgem, Belgium.

== Juniors ==
Desein reached as high as No. 4 in the combined junior world rankings in May 2005.

Junior Slam results:

Australian Open: -
French Open: 1R (2005)
Wimbledon: 3R (2004, 2005)
US Open: 2R (2004)

== Professional tour ==
His career-high ATP rankings are world No. 154 in singles in March 2015 and World No. 182 in doubles in August 2009. His favourite surface is clay.

He made his main draw debut on the ATP World Tour at the 2013 Portugal Open as a qualifier. He represented the Belgium Davis Cup team on one occasion in 2015.

=== Singles: 47 (27–20) ===
Legend ATP Challenger (1–0) ITF Futures (26–20)	Finals by surface Hard (16–11) Clay (10–4) Grass (0–1) Carpet (1–4)

Result	W–L	Date	Tournament	Tier	Surface	Opponent	Score
Loss	0–1	Jul 2005	Great Britain F8, Felixstowe	Futures	Grass	(France) Nicolas Tourte	7–6^{(7–5)}, 5–7, 3–6
Win	1–1	Jul 2006	Germany F8, Trier	Futures	Clay	(Czech Republic) Lukáš Rosol	2–6, 7–6^{(7–1)}, 6–4
Loss	1–2	Mar 2007	Portugal F3, Albufeira	Futures	Hard	(Lithuania) Ričardas Berankis	5–7, 4–6
Win	2–2	May 2007	Romania F1, Bucharest	Futures	Clay	(Slovakia) Martin Kližan	7–6^{(7–3)}, 7–6^{(9–7)}
Loss	2–3	Aug 2007	Germany F11, Wetzlar	Futures	Clay	(Germany) Alexander Flock	4–6, 2–6
Loss	2–4	Nov 2007	Israel F4, Ramat HaSharon	Futures	Hard	(Belgium) Ruben Bemelmans	3–6, 3–6
Win	3–4	Jan 2008	France F1, Deauville	Futures	Clay	(Romania) Cătălin-Ionuț Gârd	6–2, 4–6, 6–0
Loss	3–5	Aug 2008	Senegal F1, Dakar	Futures	Hard	(Canada) Pierre-Ludovic Duclos	3–6, 5–7
Win	4–5	Aug 2008	Senegal F2, Dakar	Futures	Hard	(Canada) Pierre-Ludovic Duclos	3–3 ret.
Loss	4–6	Sep 2008	France F14, Mulhouse	Futures	Hard	(Switzerland) Michael Lammer	7–6^{(7–4)}, 5–7, 3–6
Win	5–6	Oct 2008	France F18, Saint-Dizier	Futures	Hard	(France) Vincent Millot	6–7^{(1–7)}, 6–3, 6–1
Win	6–6	Oct 2008	France F19, La Roche-sur-Yon	Futures	Hard	(Slovakia) Pavol Červenák	6–4, 6–1
Win	7–6	Jul 2009	Italy F20, Modena	Futures	Clay	(Italy) Francesco Aldi	2–6, 7–5, 6–3
Win	8–6	Sep 2009	France F14, Mulhouse	Futures	Hard	(Belgium) Yannick Mertens	7–6^{(7–1)}, 6–4
Win	9–6	Oct 2009	France F19, La Roche-sur-Yon	Futures	Hard	(France) Baptiste Dupuy	3–6, 6–4, 7–6^{(7–2)}
Win	10–6	Nov 2009	Senegal F1, Dakar	Futures	Hard	(Ivory Coast) Valentin Sanon	7–6^{(7–2)}, 6–3
Win	11–6	Nov 2009	Senegal F2, Dakar	Futures	Hard	(Italy) Claudio Grassi	6–2, 6–0
Win	12–6	Feb 2010	Germany F4, Nussloch	Futures	Carpet	(Netherlands) Thomas Schoorel	6–7^{(2–7)}, 7–6^{(7–3)}, 7–6^{(8–6)}
Loss	12–7	Mar 2010	France F4, Lille	Futures	Hard	(Belgium) Ruben Bemelmans	4–6, 2–6
Loss	12–8	Jul 2010	Spain F23, Palma del Río	Futures	Hard	(Belgium) Ruben Bemelmans	6–4, 4–6, 6–7^{(1–7)}
Loss	12–9	Sep 2010	Netherlands F6, Middelburg	Futures	Clay	(Netherlands) Matwé Middelkoop	6–7^{(2–7)}, 2–6
Loss	12–10	Feb 2012	Turkey F5, Antalya	Futures	Hard	(Italy) Riccardo Ghedin	6–1, 4–6, 6–7^{(5–7)}
Loss	12–11	Mar 2012	Portugal F3, Loulé	Futures	Hard	(Hungary) Dénes Lukács	4–6, 1–6
Loss	12–12	Mar 2012	France F6, Saint-Raphaël	Futures	Hard	(France) Laurent Rochette	4–6, 1–6
Loss	12–13	Apr 2012	Greece F1, Heraklion	Futures	Carpet	(France) Yannick Jankovits	3–6, 5–7
Loss	12–14	Apr 2012	Greece F2, Heraklion	Futures	Carpet	(Greece) Alexandros Jakupovic	7–6^{(11–9)}, 3–6, 4–6
Win	13–14	Jul 2012	Belgium F1, De Haan	Futures	Clay	(Belgium) Arthur De Greef	6–2, 4–6, 6–3
Loss	13–15	Jul 2012	Netherlands F4, Middelburg	Futures	Clay	(Netherlands) Matwé Middelkoop	6–4, 2–6, 3–6
Win	14–15	Aug 2012	Belgium F8, Koksijde	Futures	Clay	(Ecuador) Juan Sebastián Vivanco	6–2, 6–0
Win	15–15	Sep 2012	Belgium F10, Damme	Futures	Clay	(Belgium) Joris de Loore	3–6, 6–2, 7–6^{(7–4)}
Loss	15–16	Sep 2012	France F15, Bagnères-de-Bigorre	Futures	Hard	(France) Julien Obry	4–6, 3–6
Win	16–16	Feb 2013	Portugal F1, Vale do Lobo	Futures	Hard	(Portugal) Pedro Sousa	7–6^{(7–3)}, 6–2
Win	17–16	Apr 2013	France F7, Angers	Futures	Clay	(France) Calvin Hemery	6–3, 6–2
Loss	17–17	Jul 2013	Netherlands F4, Middelburg	Futures	Clay	(Netherlands) Thomas Schoorel	3–6, 4–6
Win	18–17	Sep 2013	France F16, Plaisir	Futures	Hard	(Belgium) Maxime Authom	6–4, 6–4
Win	19–17	Oct 2013	Hungary F1, Budapest	Futures	Clay	(Spain) Gerard Granollers Pujol	5–7, 6–3, 6–2
Loss	19–18	Oct 2013	Portugal F11, Guimarães	Futures	Hard	(Portugal) Rui Machado	6–7^{(4–7)}, 3–6
Win	20–18	Jul 2014	Belgium F7, Middelkerke	Futures	Hard	(Belgium) Steve Darcis	6–3, 3–6, 7–6^{(8–6)}
Win	21–18	Sep 2014	France F19, Plaisir	Futures	Hard	(France) Josselin Ouanna	6–1, 7–6^{(7–4)}
Win	22–18	Oct 2014	France F21, Nevers	Futures	Hard	(France) Enzo Couacaud	6–1, 6–7^{(7–9)}, 6–2
Win	23–18	Feb 2015	Glasgow, United Kingdom	Challenger	Hard	(Belgium) Ruben Bemelmans	7–6^{(7–4)}, 2–6, 7–6^{(7–4)}
Win	24–18	Sep 2015	France F17, Bagnères-de-Bigorre	Futures	Hard	(France) Grégoire Barrère	7–5, 6–3
Win	25–18	Oct 2015	France F22, Saint-Dizier	Futures	Hard	(United States) Peter Kobelt	4–6, 6–3, 6–4
Loss	25–19	Jan 2016	Germany F3, Nussloch	Futures	Carpet	(Germany) Nils Langer	3–6, 4–6
Win	26–19	Jun 2016	Belgium F1, Binche	Futures	Clay	(France) Arthur Rinderknech	6–2, 6–7^{(3–7)}, 6–1
Win	27–19	Sep 2017	France F19, Mulhouse	Futures	Hard	(United Kingdom) Edward Corrie	6–3, 4–6, 6–3
Loss	27–20	Feb 2018	Switzerland F2, Bellevue	Futures	Carpet	(France) Ugo Humbert	7–6^{(7–2)}, 6–7^{(5–7)}, 3–6

=== Doubles: 51 (32–19) ===
Legend ATP Challenger (1–4) ITF Futures (31–15)	Finals by surface Hard (14–8) Clay (14–9) Grass (0–0) Carpet (4–2)

Result	W–L	Date	Tournament	Tier	Surface	Partner	Opponents	Score
Loss	0–1	Feb 2006	Israel F1, Ramat HaSharon	Futures	Hard	(Czech Republic) Dušan Lojda	(France) Antoine Benneteau (France) Frederic Jeanclaude	6–7^{(2–7)}, 6–7^{(4–7)}
Loss	0–2	Jun 2006	Tunisia F1, Sousse	Futures	Clay	(Czech Republic) Dušan Lojda	(Morocco) Mounir El Aarej (Tunisia) Walid Jallali	4–6, 3–6
Win	1–2	Aug 2006	Germany F11, Essen	Futures	Clay	(Belgium) Ruben Bemelmans	(Netherlands) Antal van der Duim (Netherlands) Boy Westerhof	1–6, 7–5, 7–5
Win	2–2	Jan 2007	Germany F3, Kaarst	Futures	Carpet	(Belgium) Jeroen Masson	(Germany) Daniel Brands (Germany) Ralph Grambow	6–4, 7–6^{(7–3)}
Win	3–2	Mar 2007	Portugal F2, Lagos	Futures	Hard	(Canada) Pierre-Ludovic Duclos	(Uzbekistan) Murad Inoyatov (Russia) Dmitri Sitak	6–3, 6–4
Win	4–2	May 2007	Romania F1, Bucharest	Futures	Clay	(Belgium) Jeroen Masson	(Denmark) Thomas Kromann (Denmark) Martin Pedersen	6–4, 6–1
Win	5–2	Jul 2007	Netherlands F2, Breda	Futures	Clay	(Belgium) Jeroen Masson	(Russia) Vladimir Karusevich (Argentina) Nicolás Todero	6–4, 3–6, 7–6^{(7–5)}
Loss	5–3	Nov 2007	Great Britain F21, Redbridge	Futures	Hard	(Belgium) Ruben Bemelmans	(United Kingdom) Josh Goodall (United Kingdom) Ken Skupski	7–5, 6–7^{(3–7)}, [5–10]
Win	6–3	Jan 2008	France F1, Deauville	Futures	Clay	(France) Alexandre Renard	(France) Philippe de Bonnevie (France) Petar Popović	6–3, 6–2
Win	7–3	Mar 2008	Morocco F1, Oujda	Futures	Clay	(Belgium) Jeroen Masson	(Spain) M-A López Jaén (Spain) J-M Such-Perez	6–2, 6–4
Win	8–3	Jun 2008	Netherlands F2, Alkmaar	Futures	Clay	(Belgium) Jeroen Masson	(Czech Republic) Dušan Karol (Belgium) Yannick Mertens	6–4, 6–7^{(4–7)}, [10–6]
Loss	8–4	Jun 2008	Netherlands F3, Breda	Futures	Clay	(Belgium) Jeroen Masson	(Netherlands) Jesse Huta Galung (Netherlands) Matwé Middelkoop	6–3, 3–6, [8–10]
Win	9–4	Aug 2008	Senegal F1, Dakar	Futures	Hard	(Canada) Pierre-Ludovic Duclos	(Monaco) Benjamin Balleret (France) Philippe de Bonnevie	7–5, 6–7^{(3–7)}, [10–5]
Win	10–4	Aug 2008	Senegal F2, Dakar	Futures	Hard	(Canada) Pierre-Ludovic Duclos	(Monaco) Benjamin Balleret (France) Philippe de Bonnevie	6–4, 6–4
Win	11–4	Aug 2008	Belgium F2, Koksijde	Futures	Clay	(Belgium) Ruben Bemelmans	(Belgium) Alexandre Folie (Belgium) David Goffin	7–5, 7–5
Win	12–4	Aug 2008	Italy F28, Piombino	Futures	Hard	(Canada) Pierre-Ludovic Duclos	(China) Bai Yan (China) Jun-Chao Xu	6–3, 6–3
Win	13–4	Sep 2008	France F14, Mulhouse	Futures	Hard	(Belgium) Ruben Bemelmans	(Jamaica) Dustin Brown (Germany) Stefan Seifert	7–6^{(13–11)}, 6–3
Loss	13–5	Sep 2008	Grenoble, France	Challenger	Hard	(Belgium) Dick Norman	(Austria) Martin Fischer (Austria) Philipp Oswald	7–6^{(7–5)}, 5–7, [7–10]
Win	14–5	Oct 2008	France F18, Saint-Dizier	Futures	Hard	(Belgium) Ruben Bemelmans	(Spain) Guillermo Alcaide (Russia) Nikolai Nesterov	6–4, 3–6, [10–6]
Loss	14–6	Jul 2009	San Benedetto, Italy	Challenger	Clay	(France) Stéphane Robert	(Italy) Stefano Ianni (Argentina) Cristian Villagrán	6–7^{(3–7)}, 6–1, [6–10]
Win	15–6	Jul 2009	Italy F20, Modena	Futures	Clay	(Belgium) Yannick Mertens	(Italy) Alessandro Giannessi (Italy) Filippo Leonardi	6–2, 6–1
Loss	15–7	Sep 2009	St. Remy, France	Challenger	Hard	(Belgium) Ruben Bemelmans	(Czech Republic) Jiří Krkoška (Slovakia) Lukáš Lacko	1–6, 6–3, [3–10]
Win	16–7	Oct 2009	France F19, La Roche-sur-Yon	Futures	Hard	(Canada) Pierre-Ludovic Duclos	(France) Fabrice Martin (Canada) Adil Shamasdin	7–6^{(10–8)}, 1–6, [10–5]
Win	17–7	Nov 2009	Senegal F2, Dakar	Futures	Hard	(United States) John Paul Fruttero	(United Kingdom) Philip Barlow (Germany) Tony Holzinger	6–3, 6–2
Win	18–7	Mar 2010	France F4, Lille	Futures	Hard	(Belgium) Ruben Bemelmans	(South Africa) Izak van der Merwe (South Africa) Raven Klaasen	7–6^{(7–4)}, 6–3
Loss	18–8	Oct 2010	Nigeria F1, Lagos	Futures	Hard	(France) Laurent Rochette	(Israel) Amir Weintraub (Netherlands) Boy Westerhof	walkover
Win	19–8	Mar 2012	Portugal F3, Loulé	Futures	Hard	(Belgium) Jeroen Masson	(Spain) G Gomez-Diaz (Spain) A Vivanco-Guzman	7–6^{(7–3)}, 6–3
Win	20–8	Jun 2012	Morocco F2, Rabat	Futures	Clay	(France) Alexandre Penaud	(Sweden) Kalle Averfalk (Sweden) Robin Olin	6–1, 2–6, [13–11]
Loss	20–9	Jul 2012	Tampere, Finland	Challenger	Clay	(Brazil) André Ghem	(Austria) Michael Linzer (Austria) Gerald Melzer	1–6, 6–7^{(3–7)}
Loss	20–10	Aug 2012	Belgium F6, Ostend	Futures	Clay	(Belgium) James Junior Storme	(Belgium) Joris de Loore (Chile) Juan Carlos Sáez	0–6, 4–6
Win	21–10	Sep 2012	Belgium F10, Damme	Futures	Clay	(Belgium) James Junior Storme	(Belgium) Joris de Loore (Belgium) Yannis Baltogiannis	3–6, 6–2, [10–3]
Loss	21–11	Apr 2013	France F7, Angers	Futures	Clay	(Germany) Tim Pütz	(Serbia) Ivan Bjelica (Serbia) Miljan Zekić	3–6, 4–6
Win	22–11	Apr 2013	France F8, Ajaccio	Futures	Clay	(Belgium) Yannick Mertens	(United Kingdom) Daniel Smethurst (United Kingdom) Alexander Ward	6–2, 6–2
Win	23–11	Aug 2013	Belgium F7, Ostend	Futures	Clay	(Belgium) Kimmer Coppejans	(Belgium) Sander Gillé (Spain) Roger Ordeig	6–2, 6–3
Loss	23–12	Oct 2013	Hungary F1, Budapest	Futures	Clay	(Germany) Peter Torebko	(Poland) Piotr Gadomski (Poland) Błażej Koniusz	3–6, 3–6
Loss	23–13	Mar 2014	France F6, Poitiers	Futures	Hard	(Belgium) Yannick Mertens	(Sweden) Isak Arvidsson (Sweden) Markus Eriksson	walkover
Win	24–13	Nov 2014	Eckental, Germany	Challenger	Carpet	(Belgium) Ruben Bemelmans	(Germany) Andreas Beck (Germany) Philipp Petzschner	6–3, 4–6, [10–8]
Loss	24–14	Nov 2015	Czech Republic F7, Jablonec nad Nisou	Futures	Carpet	(Czech Republic) Libor Salaba	(Netherlands) Sander Arends (Poland) Adam Majchrowicz	3–6, 4–6
Loss	24–15	Jan 2016	Germany F3, Nussloch	Futures	Carpet	(Belarus) Uladzimir Ignatik	(Germany) Johannes Härteis (Germany) Kevin Krawietz	7–6^{(7–5)}, 4–6, [8–10]
Win	25–15	Feb 2016	Switzerland F1, Nussloch	Futures	Carpet	(Russia) Denis Matsukevich	(France) Sebastien Boltz (France) Grégoire Jacq	6–0, 6–4
Loss	25–16	Jun 2016	Spain F16, Huelva	Futures	Clay	(Morocco) Lamine Ouahab	(Spain) Ivan Arenas-Gualda (Spain) David Vega Hernández	4–6, 2–6
Win	26–16	Feb 2017	Great Britain F1, Glasgow	Futures	Hard	(France) Mick Lescure	(United Kingdom) Farris Fathi Gosea (United States) Tim Kopinski	4–6, 6–4, [10–7]
Win	27–16	Mar 2017	France F4, Lille	Futures	Hard	(France) David Guez	(France) Samuel Bensoussan (France) Yanais Laurent	6–1, 6–2
Loss	27–17	Mar 2017	France F5, Toulouse	Futures	Hard	(France) Yannick Jankovits	(France) Fabien Reboul (United States) Thai-Son Kwiatkowski	3–6, 6–7^{(4–7)}
Loss	27–18	Oct 2017	Portugal F20, Oliveira de Azeméis	Futures	Hard	(France) Yannick Jankovits	(Portugal) Francisco Cabral (Portugal) Nuno Deus	6–3, 3–6, [8–10]
Win	28–18	Jan 2018	France F1, Bagnoles-de-l'Orne	Futures	Clay	(Netherlands) Boy Westerhof	(Monaco) Romain Arneodo (France) Grégoire Jacq	4–6, 6–3, [10–8]
Win	29–18	Feb 2018	Switzerland F2, Bellevue	Futures	Carpet	(France) Albano Olivetti	(United States) Charlie Emhardt (United States) Josh Hagar	6–3, 6–1
Win	30–18	Apr 2018	Portugal F8, Cascais	Futures	Clay	(Netherlands) Boy Westerhof	(Belgium) Germain Gigounon (France) Tristan Lamasine	7–6^{(7–4)}, 6–2
Loss	30–19	Aug 2018	Belgium F8, Koksijde	Futures	Clay	(Belgium) Germain Gigounon	(Belgium) Michael Geerts (Argentina) Matias Zukas	1–6, 1–6
Win	31–19	Sep 2018	France F16, Bagnères-de-Bigorre	Futures	Hard	(Belgium) Yannick Mertens	(France) Albano Olivetti (France) Dan Added	6–7^{(7–9)}, 7–5, [10–5]
Win	32–19	Feb 2019	M15 Grenoble, France	World Tennis Tour	Hard	(Belgium) Yannick Mertens	(France) Hugo Voljacques (France) Dan Added	7–6^{(9–7)}, 6–3

== Performance timeline ==
Key
W	F	SF	QF	#R	RR	Q#	DNQ	A	NH

(W) winner; (F) finalist; (SF) semifinalist; (QF) quarterfinalist; (#R) rounds 4, 3, 2, 1; (RR) round-robin stage; (Q#) qualification round; (DNQ) did not qualify; (A) absent; (NH) not held; (SR) strike rate (events won / competed); (W–L) win–loss record.

=== Singles ===
Tournament	2009	2010	2011	2012	2013	2014	2015	2016	SR	W–L	Win %
Grand Slam tournaments
Australian Open	Q2	A	A	A	Q1	Q2	Q1	Q3	0 / 0	0–0	–
French Open	Q1	Q1	A	A	Q1	Q2	Q1	A	0 / 0	0–0	–
Wimbledon	A	Q1	A	A	Q1	Q1	Q1	A	0 / 0	0–0	0%
US Open	Q1	Q1	A	A	Q1	1R	Q1	A	0 / 1	0–1	0%
Win–loss	0–0	0–0	0–0	0–0	0–0	0–1	0–0	0–0	0 / 1	0–1	0%
ATP Tour Masters 1000
Monte Carlo	A	A	A	A	A	A	Q1	A	0 / 0	0–0	–
Win–loss	0–0	0–0	0–0	0–0	0–0	0–0	0–0	0–0	0 / 0	0–0	–

== Personal life ==
Desein is married to Belgian lawyer Charlotte Verkeyn who was elected as a member of parliament in 2024. They have a son.
