= Francesco Aldi =

Italian tennis coach and former tennis player

- Country (sports): Italy
- Residence: Palermo, Italy
- Born: 17 September 1981 (age 43); Palermo, Italy
- Height: 1.75 m (5 ft 9 in)
- Turned pro: 1999
- Retired: 2012
- Plays: Right-handed
- Coach: Franscesco Cina
- Prize money: $254,542

Singles
- Career record: 1–8
- Career titles: 0
- Highest ranking: No. 111 (11 July 2005)

Grand Slam singles results
- Australian Open: Q2 (2005, 2008)
- French Open: Q2 (2005)
- Wimbledon: Q1 (2004, 2008, 2010)

Doubles
- Career record: 0–4
- Career titles: 0
- Highest ranking: No. 175 (4 July 2005)
- Last updated on: 23 March 2023.

Francesco Aldi (born 17 September 1981 in Palermo, Italy) is a tennis coach and a former Italian professional tennis player. He is Stefano Travaglia's coach.

== ATP Challenger and ITF Futures finals ==
=== Singles: 16 (6–10) ===
Legend ATP Challenger (1–5) ITF Futures (5–5)	Finals by surface Hard (0–1) Clay (6–9) Grass (0–0) Carpet (0–0)

Result	W–L	Date	Tournament	Tier	Surface	Opponent	Score
Win	1–0	May 2001	Italy F4, Viterbo	Futures	Clay	(Italy) Igor Gaudi	6–1, 2–6, 6–3
Loss	1–1	Feb 2004	Croatia F2, Zagreb	Futures	Hard	(France) Jean-Christophe Faurel	6–7^{(8–10)}, 3–6
Loss	1–2	Aug 2004	Trani, Italy	Challenger	Clay	(Italy) Filippo Volandri	1–6, 3–6
Loss	1–3	Aug 2004	Manerbio, Italy	Challenger	Clay	(Spain) Nicolás Almagro	6–7^{(5–7)}, 4–6
Loss	1–4	Oct 2004	Rome, Italy	Challenger	Clay	(Romania) Victor Hănescu	6–7^{(4–7)}, 2–6
Loss	1–5	May 2005	San Remo, Italy	Challenger	Clay	(Serbia) Novak Djokovic	3–6, 6–7^{(4–7)}
Loss	1–6	Jul 2005	Mantova, Italy	Challenger	Clay	(Italy) Giorgio Galimberti	3–6, 3–6
Win	2–6	Mar 2007	Italy F4, Siracusa	Futures	Clay	(Italy) Alberto Brizzi	4–1, 4–5^{(4–7)}, 4–1
Win	3–6	May 2007	San Remo, Italy	Challenger	Clay	(Italy) Fabio Fognini	7–5, 6–7^{(4–7)}, 6–4
Loss	3–7	Mar 2009	Spain F8, Sabadell	Futures	Clay	(Brazil) Daniel Dutra da Silva	5–7, 3–6
Win	4–7	May 2009	Italy F8, Vicenza	Futures	Clay	(Netherlands) Igor Sijsling	6–3, 4–6, 6–4
Win	5–7	Jul 2009	Italy F18, Carpi	Futures	Clay	(Romania) Adrian Ungur	6–1, 7–6^{(7–1)}
Loss	5–8	Jul 2009	Italy F20, Modena	Futures	Clay	(Belgium) Niels Desein	6–2, 5–7, 3–6
Win	6–8	Jan 2010	Spain F1, Menorca	Futures	Clay	(Spain) Sergio Gutiérrez Ferrol	6–3, 7–5
Loss	6–9	Jan 2010	Spain F2, Cala Millor	Futures	Clay	(Hungary) Attila Balázs	7–6^{(7–3)}, 4–6, 1–6
Loss	6–10	Aug 2010	Italy F19, La Spezia	Futures	Clay	(Italy) Thomas Fabbiano	0–6, 7–5, 3–6

=== Doubles: 21 (11–10) ===
Legend ATP Challenger (3–4) ITF Futures (8–6)	Finals by surface Hard (0–1) Clay (11–9) Grass (0–0) Carpet (0–0)

Result	W–L	Date	Tournament	Tier	Surface	Partner	Opponents	Score
Loss	0–1	May 2001	Italy F3, Latina	Futures	Clay	(Italy) Stefano Mocci	(France) Julien Mathieu (Luxembourg) Mike Scheidweiler	4–6, 2–6
Win	1–1	Jul 2001	Italy F9, Rimini	Futures	Clay	(Italy) Stefano Mocci	(Italy) Fabio Colangelo (Italy) Gianluca Bazzica	2–6, 6–3, 7–6^{(7–4)}
Loss	1–2	Oct 2001	France F21, La Roche-sur-Yon	Futures	Hard	(Italy) Potito Starace	(France) Jerome Hanquez (France) Régis Lavergne	2–6, 2–6
Win	2–2	May 2002	Italy F2, Pavia	Futures	Clay	(Italy) Giancarlo Petrazzuolo	(Italy) Elia Grossi (Italy) Stefano Tarallo	6–0, 0–6, 6–2
Loss	2–3	Jul 2002	Germany F9, Zell	Futures	Clay	(Italy) Tomas Tenconi	(Netherlands) Marco Marzolla (Netherlands) Raoul Snijders	7–5, 6–7^{(2–7)}, 6–7^{(9–11)}
Win	3–3	May 2003	Italy F6, Valdengo	Futures	Clay	(Italy) Giancarlo Petrazzuolo	(Finland) Janne Ojala (Brazil) Alexandre Simoni	walkover
Loss	3–4	Jul 2003	Spain F13, Alicante	Futures	Clay	(Italy) Alessandro da Col	(Spain) Guillermo García López (Spain) Santiago Ventura	2–6, 5–7
Loss	3–5	Oct 2004	Rome, Italy	Challenger	Clay	(Italy) Francesco Piccari	(Austria) Werner Eschauer (Romania) Florin Mergea	7–6^{(7–5)}, 3–6, 0–6
Win	4–5	May 2005	San Remo, Italy	Challenger	Clay	(Italy) Tomas Tenconi	(Italy) Manuel Jorquera (Russia) Dmitry Tursunov	6–4, 6–3
Loss	4–6	May 2005	Turin, Italy	Challenger	Clay	(Italy) Alessio di Mauro	(Brazil) Franco Ferreiro (Argentina) Sergio Roitman	7–6^{(7–4)}, 5–7, 6–7^{(2–7)}
Loss	4–7	Jun 2005	Reggio Emilia, Italy	Challenger	Clay	(Italy) Tomas Tenconi	(Georgia (country)) Irakli Labadze (Kazakhstan) Yuri Schukin	4–6, 3–6
Win	5–7	Jun 2006	Sassuolo, Italy	Challenger	Clay	(Italy) Tomas Tenconi	(Spain) Pablo Andújar (Italy) Leonardo Azzaro	6–0, 6–1
Win	6–7	Aug 2006	Cordenons, Italy	Challenger	Clay	(Croatia) Lovro Zovko	(Italy) Marco Crugnola (Italy) Marco Pedrini	6–4, 6–3
Win	7–7	Mar 2009	Spain F7, Terrassa	Futures	Clay	(Italy) Alessandro Piccari	(Canada) Steven Diez (Spain) José Checa Calvo	6–0, 6–2
Loss	7–8	Jul 2009	Italy F17, Bologna	Futures	Clay	(Italy) Federico Torresi	(Czech Republic) Roman Jebavý (Slovakia) Martin Kližan	3–6, 6–7^{(6–8)}
Win	8–8	Mar 2010	Italy F2, Rome	Futures	Clay	(Italy) Daniele Giorgini	(Austria) Andreas Haider-Maurer (Austria) Bertram Steinberger	6–4, 6–2
Loss	8–9	Jul 2010	San Benedetto, Italy	Challenger	Clay	(Italy) Daniele Giorgini	(Italy) Thomas Fabbiano (Spain) Gabriel Trujillo Soler	6–7^{(4–7)}, 6–7^{(5–7)}
Win	9–9	Jul 2010	Italy F18, Modena	Futures	Clay	(Italy) Walter Trusendi	(Italy) Filippo Leonardi (Italy) Jacopo Marchegiani	6–3, 6–4
Loss	9–10	Apr 2011	Italy F4, Rome	Futures	Clay	(Italy) Marco Cecchinato	(Argentina) Leandro Migani (Sweden) Filip Prpic	3–6, 6–3, [6–10]
Win	10–10	Jul 2011	Italy F17, Sassuolo	Futures	Clay	(Italy) Marco Cecchinato	(Italy) Filippo Leonardi (Italy) Jacopo Marchegiani	6–4, 6–3
Win	11–10	Aug 2011	Spain F27, Xàtiva	Futures	Clay	(Italy) Marco Cecchinato	(Spain) Ivan Arenas Gualda (Spain) Enrique López Pérez	6–4, 6–3
