= Cristian Villagrán =

Swiss-Argentine tennis player

- Country (sports): Argentina; Switzerland
- Residence: Neuchâtel, Suisse
- Born: 20 January 1982 (age 44) Buenos Aires, Argentina
- Height: 1.80 m (5 ft 11 in)
- Turned pro: 2001
- Plays: Right-handed
- Coach: Franco Davín
- Prize money: $191,594

Singles
- Career record: 0–0
- Career titles: 0
- Highest ranking: No. 200 (7 July 2008)

Grand Slam singles results
- French Open: Q2 (2005)
- Wimbledon: Q1 (2005, 2006, 2007, 2008)
- US Open: Q1 (2005)

Doubles
- Career record: 2–2
- Career titles: 0
- Highest ranking: No. 115 (6 February 2006)
- Last updated on: 28 April 2021.

Cristian Villagrán (born 20 January 1982) is a Swiss-Argentine professional tennis player. He has a career-high ATP singles ranking of world No. 200 achieved on 7 July 2009, and a career-high ATP doubles ranking of world No. 115 achieved on 6 February 2006.

Villagran reached 28 career singles finals, posting a tally of 20 wins and 8 losses including a 1–2 record in ATP Challenger Tour finals. He won the 2006 Mantova Challenger tournament held on clay courts in Italy, where he defeated Giorgio Galimberti 6–2, 5-7, 6–4 in the final to win the championship. Additionally, he has also reached 28 career doubles finals with a record of 23 wins and 5 losses which includes a 7–1 record in ATP Challenger Tour finals.

== Career ==
As a junior, Villagrán reached as high as world No. 13 in the singles rankings in 2000, as well as world No. 41 in doubles.

Villagran made his ATP Tour debut at the 2005 Buenos Aires tournament on clay courts in Argentina where he was granted a wild card entry into doubles main draw alongside compatriot Juan Pablo Brzezicki. They pulled off a major upset, defeating first seeds Gastón Etlis and Martín Rodríguez in the first round 2–6, 6-2, 6–3. They would continue their run by defeating Enzo Artoni and Ignacio González King in the second round 7–6^{(7–3)}, 2-6, 6–3 before finally being defeated in the semifinals by José Acasuso and Sebastián Prieto by a score of 6–7^{(8–10)}, 4-6 to end their impressive run. Two years later at the 2007 Buenos Aires Open he was given another wild card entry into the doubles draw, alongside Eduardo Schwank however they were defeated in the first round by Martin Garcia and Sebastián Prieto in three sets 4-6, 6–2, [12–14].

== Personal life ==
Villagrán was born and raised in Argentina, but went to compete in a tennis tournament in Neuchâtel, Switzerland. There, he met his future wife and trainer, Pamela, who he married in 2008. He has since moved to Switzerland permanently, eventually becoming a citizen.

== ATP Challenger and ITF Futures finals ==
=== Singles: 28 (20–8) ===
| Legend ATP Challenger (1–2) ITF Futures (19–6) | Finals by surface Hard (0–0) Clay (20–8) Grass (0–0) Carpet (0–0) |

| Result | W–L | Date | Tournament | Tier | Surface | Opponent | Score |
|---|---|---|---|---|---|---|---|
| Win | 1–0 | Jun 2002 | Chile F1, Santiago | Futures | Clay | (Chile) Phillip Harboe | 7–5, 6–2 |
| Win | 2–0 | Sep 2002 | Bolivia F3, Santa Cruz | Futures | Clay | (Argentina) Diego Hartfield | 6–4, 6–4 |
| Win | 3–0 | May 2004 | Argentina F1, Buenos Aires | Futures | Clay | (South Korea) Cha Bo-ram | 6–3, 6–3 |
| Win | 4–0 | May 2004 | Argentina F2, Buenos Aires | Futures | Clay | (Argentina) Carlos Berlocq | 6–4, 6–2 |
| Loss | 4–1 | May 2004 | Argentina F3, Buenos Aires | Futures | Clay | (Argentina) Carlos Berlocq | 4–6, 2–6 |
| Loss | 4–2 | Jul 2004 | San Benedetto, Italy | Challenger | Clay | (Italy) Daniele Bracciali | 6–7^{(3–7)}, 1–6 |
| Win | 5–2 | Aug 2004 | Chile F1B, Santiago | Futures | Clay | (Chile) Julio Peralta | 6–4, 6–4 |
| Win | 6–2 | Sep 2004 | Argentina F5, Buenos Aires | Futures | Clay | (Argentina) Horacio Zeballos | 6–2, 6–1 |
| Win | 7–2 | Oct 2004 | Bolivia F2, Santa Cruz | Futures | Clay | (Portugal) Leonardo Tavares | 6–3, 6–3 |
| Win | 8–2 | Mar 2006 | Argentina F1, Buenos Aires | Futures | Clay | (Argentina) Brian Dabul | 6–2, 6–3 |
| Win | 9–2 | Mar 2006 | Argentina F2, Buenos Aires | Futures | Clay | (Argentina) Sebastián Decoud | 6–2, 2–6, 6–4 |
| Loss | 9–3 | Apr 2006 | Argentina F3, Buenos Aires | Futures | Clay | (Argentina) Eduardo Schwank | 6–4, 3–6, 4–6 |
| Win | 10–3 | Apr 2006 | Uruguay F2, Montevideo | Futures | Clay | (Argentina) Juan-Martín Aranguren | 6–2, 6–3 |
| Win | 11–3 | May 2006 | Argentina F5, Buenos Aires | Futures | Clay | (Argentina) Eduardo Schwank | 6–4, 6–1 |
| Win | 12–3 | Jun 2006 | Argentina F9, Buenos Aires | Futures | Clay | (Argentina) Brian Dabul | 6–1, 6–2 |
| Win | 13–3 | Jul 2006 | Mantova, Italy | Challenger | Clay | (Italy) Giorgio Galimberti | 6–2, 5–7, 6–4 |
| Win | 14–3 | Jul 2007 | Italy F21, Bologna | Futures | Clay | (Italy) Enrico Burzi | 3–6, 6–1, 6–3 |
| Win | 15–3 | Jul 2007 | Italy F22, Carpi | Futures | Clay | (Italy) Matteo Marrai | 6–7^{(1–7)}, 6–3, 6–2 |
| Win | 16–3 | Jul 2007 | Italy F23, Palazzolo | Futures | Clay | (Argentina) Marcelo Charpentier | 5–7, 6–1, 6–4 |
| Win | 17–3 | Jul 2007 | Italy F24, Modena | Futures | Clay | (Italy) Thomas Fabbiano | 6–0, 6–1 |
| Loss | 17–4 | Oct 2007 | Portugal F4, Porto | Futures | Clay | (Portugal) Leonardo Tavares | 6–4, 1–6, 2–6 |
| Loss | 17–5 | Oct 2007 | Portugal F5, Espinho | Futures | Clay | (Spain) José Antonio Sánchez de Luna | 3–6, 2–6 |
| Loss | 17–6 | Dec 2007 | Uruguay F1, Montevideo | Futures | Clay | (Argentina) Alejandro Fabbri | 6–3, 6–7^{(3–7)}, 3–6 |
| Win | 18–6 | Apr 2009 | Italy F7, Padova | Futures | Clay | (Germany) Julian Reister | 1–6, 7–6^{(7–5)}, 6–0 |
| Loss | 18–7 | Jul 2009 | San Benedetto, Italy | Challenger | Clay | (Italy) Fabio Fognini | 7–6^{(7–5)}, 6–7^{(2–7)}, 0–6 |
| Win | 19–7 | Aug 2014 | Switzerland F5, Lausanne | Futures | Clay | (Argentina) Maximiliano Estévez | 6–4, 0–6, 6–2 |
| Loss | 19–8 | Sep 2015 | Switzerland F5, Lausanne | Futures | Clay | (Italy) Roberto Marcora | 6–7^{(5–7)}, 7–6^{(7–2)}, 4–6 |
| Win | 20–8 | Aug 2016 | Switzerland F4, Lausanne | Futures | Clay | (France) Laurent Lokoli | 6–4, 6–7^{(6–8)}, 6–3 |

=== Doubles: 28 (23–5) ===
| Legend ATP Challenger (7–1) ITF Futures (16–4) | Finals by surface Hard (2–0) Clay (21–5) Grass (0–0) Carpet (0–0) |

| Result | W–L | Date | Tournament | Tier | Surface | Partner | Opponents | Score |
|---|---|---|---|---|---|---|---|---|
| Win | 1–0 | Jul 2000 | Argentina F7, Concordia | Futures | Clay | (Argentina) Juan Pablo Brzezicki | (Argentina) Sebastián Decoud (Argentina) Patricio Arquez | 6–3, 6–1 |
| Loss | 1–1 | Oct 2000 | Bolivia F2, Cochabamba | Futures | Clay | (Argentina) Rodolfo Daruich | (Argentina) Gustavo Marcaccio (Argentina) Patricio Rudi | 1–6, 2–6 |
| Win | 2–1 | Oct 2000 | Bolivia F3, Santa Cruz | Futures | Clay | (Argentina) Juan Pablo Brzezicki | (Chile) Jaime Fillol Jr. (Chile) Miguel Miranda | 7–5, 6–3 |
| Win | 3–1 | Oct 2000 | Paraguay F1, Asunción | Futures | Clay | (Argentina) Juan Pablo Brzezicki | (Brazil) Márcio Carlsson (Brazil) Ricardo Schlachter | 7–5, 6–3 |
| Win | 4–1 | Apr 2001 | Argentina F4, Mendoza | Futures | Clay | (Argentina) Juan Pablo Guzmán | (Argentina) Diego del Río (Argentina) Leonardo Olguín | 6–2, 3–6, 6–3 |
| Win | 5–1 | Oct 2001 | Colombia F1, Bogotá | Futures | Clay | (Argentina) Juan Pablo Guzmán | (Brazil) Eduardo Bohrer (Brazil) Luis Marafelli | 6–4, 7–6^{(7–1)} |
| Loss | 5–2 | Aug 2002 | Spain F8, Dénia | Futures | Clay | (Argentina) Antonio Pastorino | (France) Julien Cuaz (Netherlands) Jasper Smit | 6–3, 2–6, 4–6 |
| Win | 6–2 | Jan 2003 | Jamaica F1, Montego Bay | Futures | Hard | (Argentina) Carlos Berlocq | (Argentina) Diego Veronelli (Argentina) Juan Pablo Guzmán | 7–5, 6–4 |
| Win | 7–2 | Nov 2003 | Argentina F5, Buenos Aires | Futures | Clay | (Argentina) Carlos Berlocq | (Argentina) Cristian Kordasz (Argentina) Andres Dellatorre | 6–7^{(6–8)}, 7–5, 6–3 |
| Win | 8–2 | Jun 2004 | Netherlands F1, Alkmaar | Futures | Clay | (Argentina) Diego Hartfield | (Japan) Jun Kato (Netherlands Antilles) Jean-Julien Rojer | 6–2, 6–3 |
| Loss | 8–3 | Oct 2004 | Bolivia F2, Santa Cruz | Futures | Clay | (Argentina) Juan-Martín Aranguren | (Brazil) Thiago Alves (Brazil) Júlio Silva | 3–6, 7–5, 0–6 |
| Win | 9–3 | Mar 2005 | Salinas, Ecuador | Challenger | Hard | (Argentina) Juan Pablo Brzezicki | (Argentina) Sergio Roitman (Argentina) Juan Pablo Guzmán | 6–2, 6–4 |
| Loss | 9–4 | May 2005 | Argentina F3, Córdoba | Futures | Clay | (Argentina) Matias Niemiz | (Uruguay) Pablo Cuevas (Argentina) Horacio Zeballos | 2–6, 2–6 |
| Win | 10–4 | Jun 2005 | Sassuolo, Italy | Challenger | Clay | (Argentina) Juan Pablo Brzezicki | (Italy) Simone Vagnozzi (Chile) Paul Capdeville | 7–6^{(7–5)}, 6–2 |
| Win | 11–4 | Aug 2005 | Trani, Italy | Challenger | Clay | (Argentina) Carlos Berlocq | (Georgia (country)) Irakli Labadze (Italy) Giorgio Galimberti | 4–6, 6–2, 6–4 |
| Win | 12–4 | Feb 2006 | Florianópolis, Brazil | Challenger | Clay | (Argentina) Juan Pablo Brzezicki | (United States) Mirko Pehar (Italy) Gianluca Naso | 7–6^{(7–3)}, 6–2 |
| Win | 13–4 | Mar 2006 | Argentina F2, Buenos Aires | Futures | Clay | (Argentina) Brian Dabul | (Argentina) Eduardo Schwank (Argentina) Matias O'Neille | 2–6, 6–4, 6–2 |
| Win | 14–4 | Apr 2006 | Argentina F3, Buenos Aires | Futures | Clay | (Argentina) Brian Dabul | (Argentina) Eduardo Schwank (Argentina) Esteban Zanetti | 6–4, 6–2 |
| Win | 15–4 | May 2006 | Argentina F5, Buenos Aires | Futures | Clay | (Argentina) Brian Dabul | (Argentina) Diego Cristin (Uruguay) Martín Vilarrubí | 6–4, 6–7^{(5–7)}, 6–3 |
| Win | 16–4 | May 2006 | Argentina F7, Buenos Aires | Futures | Clay | (Argentina) Brian Dabul | (Cuba) Ricardo Chile-Fonte (Cuba) Sandor Martínez-Breijo | 6–1, 2–6, 6–1 |
| Win | 17–4 | Jun 2006 | Argentina F9, Buenos Aires | Futures | Clay | (Argentina) Brian Dabul | (Argentina) Diego Cristin (Uruguay) Marcel Felder | 6–7^{(2–7)}, 6–3, 7–5 |
| Win | 18–4 | Jul 2006 | Rimini, Italy | Challenger | Clay | (Argentina) Juan Pablo Brzezicki | (Romania) Gabriel Moraru (Greece) Vasilis Mazarakis | 6–2, 5–7, [10–6] |
| Win | 19–4 | Sep 2006 | Belém, Brazil | Challenger | Clay | (Argentina) Brian Dabul | (Italy) Alessandro da Col (Italy) Francesco Piccari | 6–1, 7–6^{(7–5)} |
| Win | 20–4 | Jun 2007 | Italy F16, Cesena | Futures | Clay | (Argentina) Eduardo Schwank | (Italy) Alessandro da Col (Italy) Francesco Piccari | 6–3, 6–2 |
| Win | 21–4 | Oct 2007 | Portugal F4, Porto | Futures | Clay | (Switzerland) Yann Marti | (Spain) Pablo Santos González (Spain) David Marrero | walkover |
| Loss | 21–5 | Jan 2008 | La Serena, Chile | Challenger | Clay | (Argentina) Sebastián Decoud | (Ecuador) Nicolás Lapentti (Argentina) Eduardo Schwank | 4–6, 0–6 |
| Win | 22–5 | Apr 2009 | Italy F6, Vercelli | Futures | Clay | (Switzerland) Mathieu Guenat | (Argentina) Alejandro Fabbri (Argentina) Leandro Migani | 7–5, 6–4 |
| Win | 23–5 | Jul 2009 | San Benedetto, Italy | Challenger | Clay | (Italy) Stefano Ianni | (France) Stéphane Robert (Belgium) Niels Desein | 7–6^{(7–3)}, 1–6, [10–6] |
