= Gianmarco Ferrari =

Italian tennis player (born 2000)

- Country (sports): Italy
- Born: 4 October 2000 (age 26) Prato, Italy
- Height: 1.91 m (6 ft 3 in)
- Plays: Left-handed (two-handed backhand)
- Coach: Elia Grossi, Giuseppe Fischetti
- Prize money: US $145,910

Singles
- Career record: 0–0 (at ATP Tour level, Grand Slam level, and in Davis Cup)
- Career titles: 2 ITF
- Highest ranking: No. 387 (22 May 2023)
- Current ranking: No. 502 (19 October 2026)

Doubles
- Career record: 0–1 (at ATP Tour level, Grand Slam level, and in Davis Cup)
- Career titles: 2 ITF
- Highest ranking: No. 296 (24 April 2023)
- Current ranking: No. 1,489 (19 October 2026)
- Last updated on: 19 October 2026.

Gianmarco Ferrari (born 4 October 2000) is an Italian tennis player. He has a career-high ATP singles ranking of world No. 387 achieved on 22 May 2023 and a career high ATP doubles ranking of No. 296 achieved on 24 April 2023.

== Career ==
Ferrari made his ATP main draw debut at the 2023 Italian Open after receiving a wildcard into the doubles main draw with Federico Arnaboldi.
