= San Benedetto Tennis Cup =

- 2023 San Benedetto Tennis Cup

ATP Challenger Tour
- Event name: San Benedetto
- Location: San Benedetto del Tronto, Italy
- Venue: Circolo Tennis Maggioni
- Category: ATP Challenger Tour
- Surface: Clay (red)
- Draw: 48S/4Q/16D
- Prize money: €42,500+H
- Website: Website

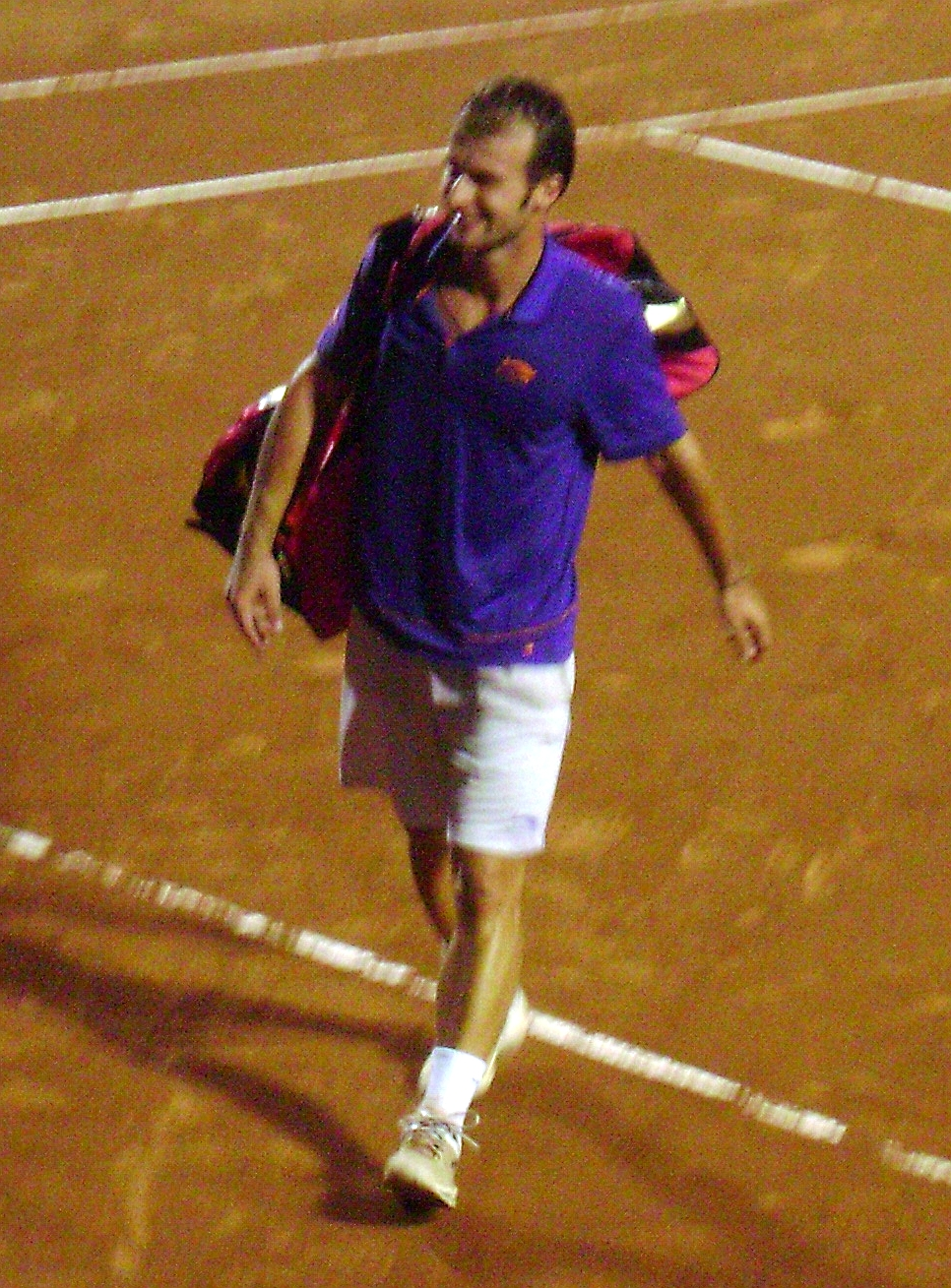
Romanian Adrian Ungur lifted the singles trophy in 2011

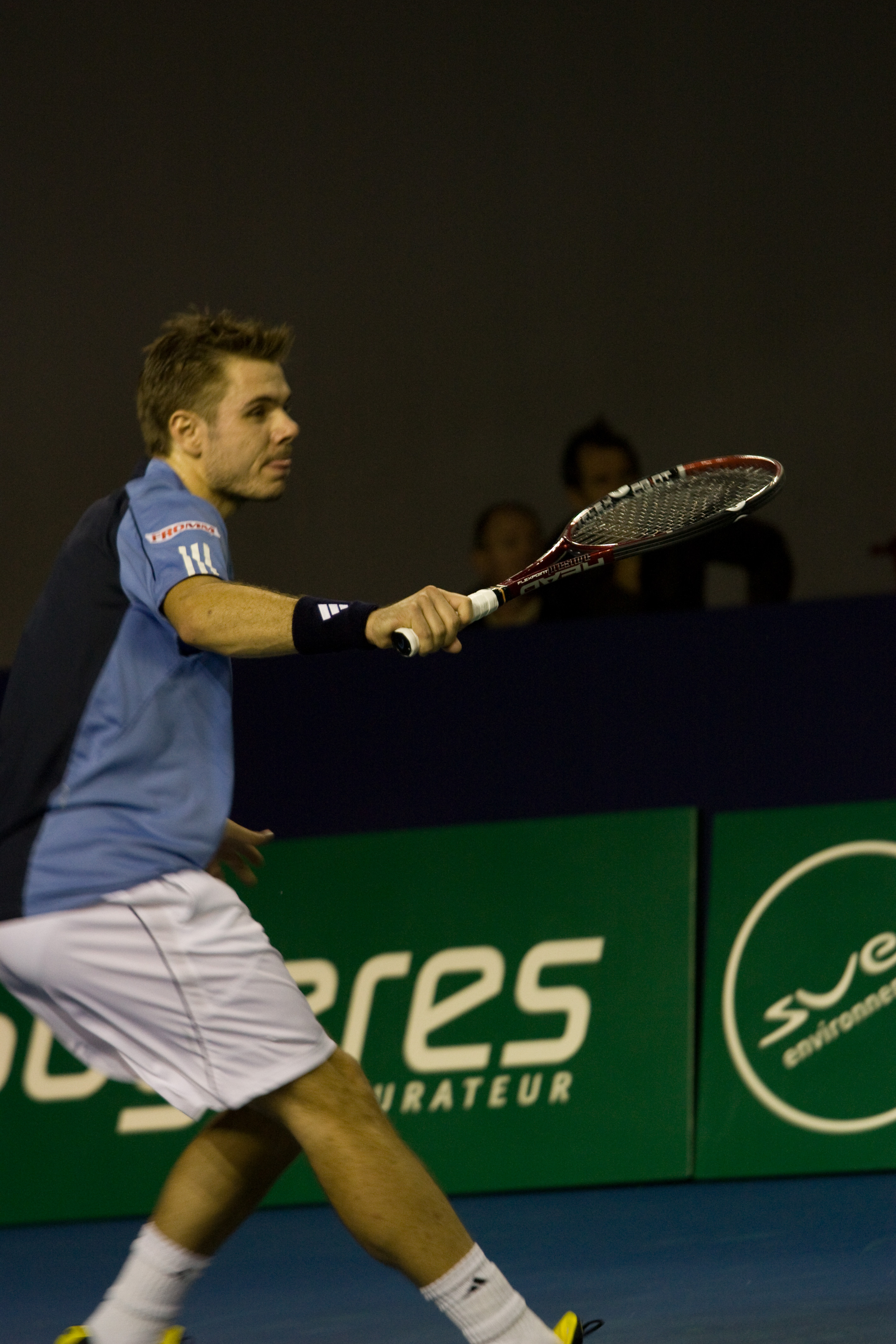
Eventual top tenner Stanislas Wawrinka from Switzerland won the singles title in San Benedetto in 2003

The San Benedetto Tennis Cup was a professional tennis tournament played on outdoor red clay courts. It was part of the Association of Tennis Professionals (ATP) Challenger Tour. It was held annually at the Circolo Tennis Maggioni in San Benedetto del Tronto, Italy, from 2001 until 2023.

== Past finals ==
=== Singles ===
Year	Champion	Runner-up	Score
2023	(France) Benoît Paire	(France) Richard Gasquet	4–6, 6–1, 6–1
2022	(Italy) Raúl Brancaccio	(Italy) Andrea Vavassori	6–1, 6–1
2020–2021	Not held		
2019	(Argentina) Renzo Olivo	(Italy) Alessandro Giannessi	5–7, 7–6^{(7–4)}, 6–4
2018	(Colombia) Daniel Elahi Galán	(Spain) Sergio Gutiérrez Ferrol	6–2, 3–6, 6–2
2017	(Italy) Matteo Berrettini	(Serbia) Laslo Djere	6–3, 6–4
2016	(Italy) Federico Gaio	(France) Constant Lestienne	6–2, 1–6, 6–3
2015	(Spain) Albert Ramos-Viñolas	(Italy) Alessandro Giannessi	6–2, 6–4
2014	(Bosnia and Herzegovina) Damir Džumhur	(Austria) Andreas Haider-Maurer	6–3, 6–3
2013	(Slovakia) Andrej Martin	(Portugal) João Sousa	6–4, 6–3
2012	(Italy) Gianluca Naso	(Austria) Andreas Haider-Maurer	6–4, 7–5
2011	(Romania) Adrian Ungur	(Italy) Stefano Galvani	7–5, 6–2
2010	(Argentina) Carlos Berlocq	(Spain) Daniel Gimeno Traver	6–3, 4–6, 6–4
2009	(Italy) Fabio Fognini	(Argentina) Cristian Villagrán	6–7(5), 7–6(2), 6–0
2008	(Argentina) Máximo González	(Argentina) Diego Junqueira	6–4, 7–6(5)
2007 – 2005	Not held		
2004	(Italy) Daniele Bracciali	(Argentina) Cristian Villagrán	7–6(3) 6–1
2003	(Switzerland) Stanislas Wawrinka	(Spain) Salvador Navarro	6–1, 4–6, 6–4
2002	Not held		
2001	(Italy) Marzio Martelli	(Spain) Salvador Navarro	6–4, 6–2

=== Doubles ===
Year	Champions	Runners-up	Score
2023	(Brazil) Fernando Romboli (Brazil) Marcelo Zormann	(Ecuador) Diego Hidalgo (Colombia) Cristian Rodríguez	6–3, 6–4
2022	(Ukraine) Vladyslav Manafov (Ukraine) Oleg Prihodko	(Hungary) Fábián Marozsán (Czech Republic) Lukáš Rosol	4–6, 6–3, [12–10]
2020–2021	Not held		
2019	(Croatia) Ivan Sabanov (Croatia) Matej Sabanov	(Peru) Sergio Galdós (Peru) Juan Pablo Varillas	6–4, 4–6, [10–5]
2018	(Italy) Julian Ocleppo (Italy) Andrea Vavassori	(Peru) Sergio Galdós (Bolivia) Federico Zeballos	6–3, 6–2
2017	(Spain) Carlos Taberner (Spain) Pol Toledo Bagué	(Italy) Flavio Cipolla (Romania) Adrian Ungur	7–5, 6–4
2016	(Italy) Federico Gaio (Italy) Stefano Napolitano	(Argentina) Facundo Argüello (Peru) Sergio Galdós	6–3, 6–4
2015	(Croatia) Dino Marcan (Croatia) Antonio Šančić	(Mexico) César Ramírez (Mexico) Miguel Ángel Reyes-Varela	6–3, 6–7^{(10–12)}, [12–10]
2014	(Italy) Daniele Giorgini (Italy) Potito Starace	(Bolivia) Hugo Dellien (Peru) Sergio Galdós	6–3, 6–7^{(3–7)}, [10–5]
2013	(France) Pierre-Hugues Herbert (France) Maxime Teixeira	(Italy) Alessandro Giannessi (Portugal) João Sousa	6–4, 6–3
2012	(Australia) Brydan Klein (Australia) Dane Propoggia	(Italy) Stefano Ianni (Italy) Gianluca Naso	3–6, 6–4, [12–10]
2011	(Italy) Alessio di Mauro (Italy) Alessandro Motti	(Italy) Daniele Giorgini (Italy) Stefano Travaglia	7–6^{(7–5)}, 4–6, [10–7]
2010	(Italy) Thomas Fabbiano (Spain) Gabriel Trujillo Soler	(Italy) Francesco Aldi (Italy) Daniele Giorgini	7–6(4), 7–6(5)
2009	(Italy) Stefano Ianni (Argentina) Cristian Villagrán	(Belgium) Niels Desein (France) Stéphane Robert	7–6(3), 1–6, 10–6
2008	(Italy) Paolo Lorenzi (Brazil) Júlio Silva	(Romania) Cătălin Gârd (Austria) Max Raditschnigg	6–3, 7–5
2007 – 2005	Not held		
2004	(Italy) Daniele Bracciali (Italy) Giorgio Galimberti	(Argentina) Andres Dellatorre (Argentina) Nicolás Todero	6–4, 7–5
2003	(Australia) Todd Perry (Japan) Thomas Shimada	(Italy) Daniele Giorgini (Italy) Simone Vagnozzi	6–3, 6–4
2002	Not held		
2001	(Italy) Leonardo Azzaro (Italy) Stefano Galvani	(Australia) Stephen Huss (Australia) Lee Pearson	3–6, 7–6(7), 6–4
