= Daniele Giorgini =

Italian tennis player

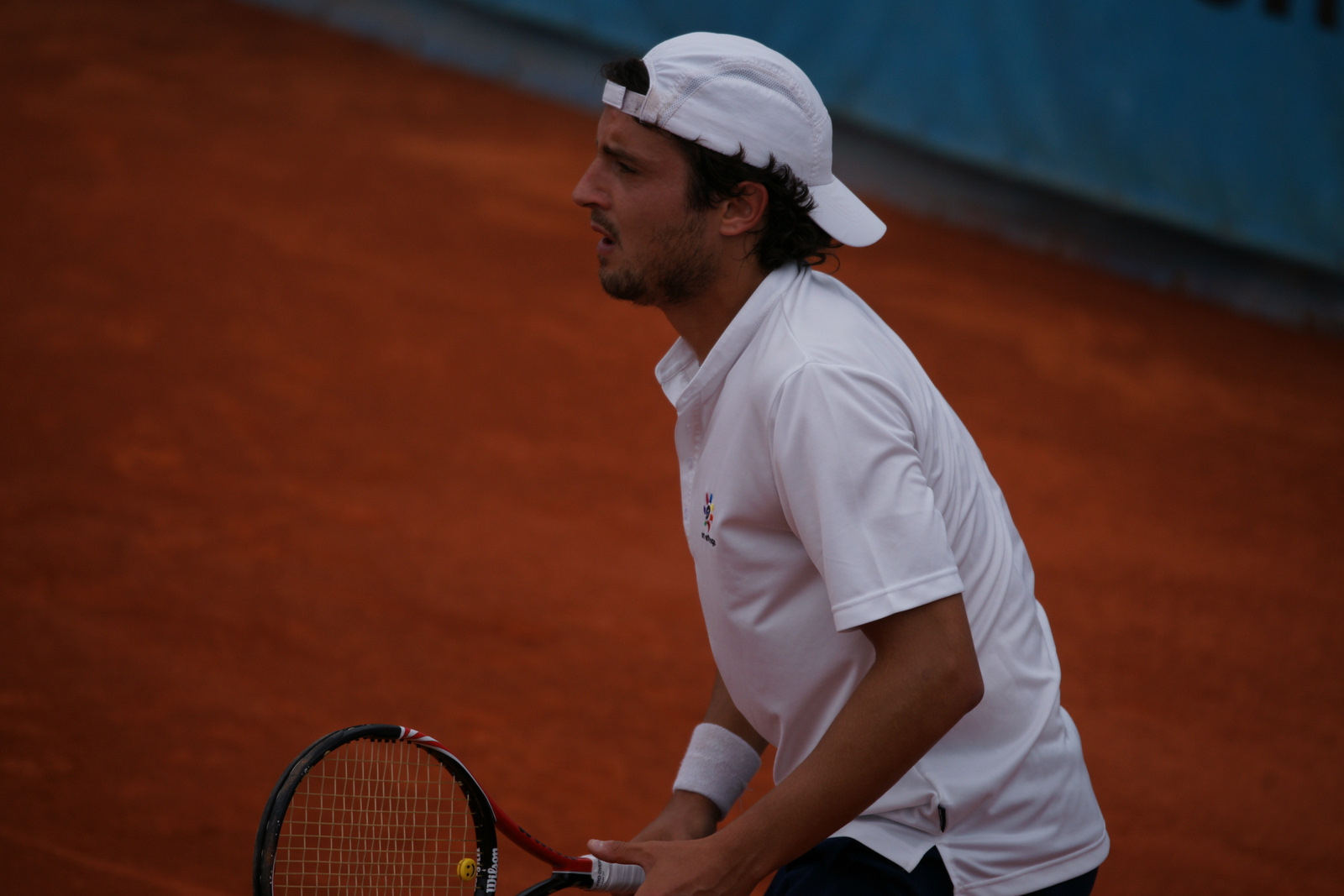
- Daniele Giorgini at the 2011 Open de Nice Côte d'Azur
- Country (sports): Italy
- Residence: San Benedetto del Tronto, Italy
- Born: 24 April 1984 (age 42) San Benedetto del Tronto, Italy
- Height: 1.80 m (5 ft 11 in)
- Turned pro: 2003
- Plays: Right-handed
- Prize money: $171,393

Singles
- Career record: 0–0
- Career titles: 0; 0 Challenger, 15 Futures
- Highest ranking: No. 242 (2 August 2010)

Grand Slam singles results
- US Open: Q1 (2010)

Doubles
- Career record: 0–0
- Career titles: 0; 8 Challenger, 25 Futures
- Highest ranking: No. 143 (22 November 2004)
- Last updated on: 20 March 2023.

Daniele Giorgini (Italian pronunciation: [daˈnjɛːle dʒorˈdʒiːni]; born 24 April 1984) is an Italian professional tennis player.

== ATP Challenger and ITF Futures finals ==
=== Singles: 28 (15–13) ===
Legend ATP Challenger (0–0) ITF Futures (15–13)	Finals by surface Hard (0–2) Clay (15–11) Grass (0–0) Carpet (0–0)

Result	W–L	Date	Tournament	Tier	Surface	Opponent	Score
Loss	0–1	Sep 2003	Italy F10, Selargius	Futures	Hard	(Italy) Uros Vico	3–6, 6–7^{(1–7)}
Win	1–1	Apr 2004	Italy F1, Frascati	Futures	Clay	(Spain) Santiago Ventura	7–6^{(7–4)}, 6–4
Loss	1–2	Sep 2004	Italy F24, Porto Torres	Futures	Hard	(Italy) Andrea Stoppini	1–6, 3–6
Win	2–2	Aug 2005	Italy F27, San Benedetto del Tronto	Futures	Clay	(Italy) Manuel Jorquera	6–3, 6–1
Win	3–2	Feb 2006	Italy F1, Bari	Futures	Clay	(Italy) Leonardo Azzaro	6–4, 3–6, 7–5
Win	4–2	Mar 2006	Italy F3, Rome	Futures	Clay	(Italy) Giancarlo Petrazzuolo	7–6^{(7–1)}, 6–4
Win	5–2	Apr 2006	Italy F11, Padua	Futures	Clay	(Germany) Julian Reister	5–7, 6–1, 6–1
Loss	5–3	May 2006	Italy F12, Piacenza	Futures	Clay	(France) Ludwig Pellerin	1–6, 7–6^{(7–5)}, 4–6
Win	6–3	Jun 2006	Italy F18, Bassano	Futures	Clay	(Italy) Fabio Colangelo	6–2, 3–6, 6–3
Win	7–3	Oct 2006	Italy F33, Olbia	Futures	Clay	(France) Jordane Doble	6–3, 6–2
Loss	7–4	Oct 2006	Italy F34, Sassari	Futures	Clay	(Italy) Leonardo Azzaro	2–6, 7–5, 4–6
Loss	7–5	Feb 2007	Italy F1, Bari	Futures	Clay	(France) Éric Prodon	2–6, 6–4, 2–6
Loss	7–6	Feb 2009	Egypt F2, Cairo	Futures	Clay	(Italy) Simone Vagnozzi	6–7^{(3–7)}, 7–5, 4–6
Win	8–6	Aug 2009	Italy F21, La Spezia	Futures	Clay	(Germany) Marius Zay	6–2, 5–7, 6–3
Loss	8–7	Aug 2009	Italy F22, Avezzano	Futures	Clay	(Serbia) Goran Tošić	1–6, 6–4, 6–7^{(4–7)}
Win	9–7	Sep 2009	Italy F26, Trieste	Futures	Clay	(Italy) Claudio Grassi	4–6, 6–1, 6–1
Loss	9–8	Apr 2010	Italy F5, Padua	Futures	Clay	(Germany) Cedrik-Marcel Stebe	6–4, 1–6, 2–6
Win	10–8	May 2010	Italy F9, Parma	Futures	Clay	(Austria) Johannes Ager	6–4, 5–7, 6–3
Win	11–8	Apr 2011	Italy F4, Rome	Futures	Clay	(Italy) Alessandro Giannessi	7–5, 6–1
Win	12–8	Jul 2011	Italy F16, Bologna	Futures	Clay	(Australia) James Duckworth	7–6^{(7–4)}, 7–6^{(7–3)}
Loss	12–9	Aug 2011	Italy F23, Padua	Futures	Clay	(Australia) James Duckworth	2–6, 3–6
Win	13–9	Apr 2012	Italy F3, Rome	Futures	Clay	(United Kingdom) Morgan Phillips	7–5, 6–2
Loss	13–10	Sep 2012	Italy F27, Biella	Futures	Clay	(Spain) Marc Giner	3–6, 5–7
Loss	13–11	Aug 2013	Italy F19, La Spezia	Futures	Clay	(Italy) Alessandro Giannessi	2–6, 3–6
Win	14–11	Jul 2014	Italy F23, Modena	Futures	Clay	(Italy) Federico Gaio	6–3, 6–4
Loss	14–12	Jul 2014	Italy F24, Fano	Futures	Clay	(Australia) Jason Kubler	1–6, 7–5, 3–6
Loss	14–13	Aug 2014	Italy F27, Appiano Gentile	Futures	Clay	(Bosnia and Herzegovina) Tomislav Brkić	6–7^{(3–7)}, 6–7^{(8–10)}
Win	15–13	Jun 2015	Italy F14, Naples	Futures	Clay	(Croatia) Viktor Galović	6–2, 6–3

=== Doubles: 56 (33–23) ===
Legend ATP Challenger (8–9) ITF Futures (25–14)	Finals by surface Hard (4–1) Clay (29–22) Grass (0–0) Carpet (0–0)

Result	W–L	Date	Tournament	Tier	Surface	Partner	Opponents	Score
Loss	0–1	Apr 2003	Italy F3, Viterbo	Futures	Clay	(Italy) Flavio Cipolla	(Russia) Igor Andreev (Hungary) Gergely Kisgyörgy	2–6, 2–6
Loss	0–2	May 2003	Italy F5, Teramo	Futures	Clay	(Italy) Alessandro Motti	(Poland) Bartlomiej Dabrowski (Poland) Mariusz Fyrstenberg	6–2, 4–6, 3–6
Win	1–2	May 2003	Italy F7, Pavia	Futures	Clay	(Italy) Flavio Cipolla	(Romania) Victor-Mugurel Anagnastopol (Netherlands) Paul Logtens	6–2, 6–2
Loss	1–3	Aug 2003	San Benedetto, Italy	Challenger	Clay	(Italy) Simone Vagnozzi	(Australia) Todd Perry (Japan) Thomas Shimada	3–6, 4–6
Loss	1–4	Sep 2003	Genoa, Italy	Challenger	Clay	(Italy) Potito Starace	(Italy) Daniele Bracciali (Italy) Vincenzo Santopadre	3–6, 2–6
Win	2–4	Sep 2003	Italy F9, Oristano	Futures	Hard	(Italy) Stefano Mocci	(Italy) Alessandro Motti (Italy) Uros Vico	2–6, 6–4, 7–6^{(7–3)}
Loss	2–5	Apr 2004	Italy F1, Frascati	Futures	Clay	(Italy) Giancarlo Petrazzuolo	(Germany) Marcello Craca (Kazakhstan) Yuri Schukin	7–6^{(7–3)}, 3–6, 4–6
Loss	2–6	May 2004	Rome, Italy	Challenger	Clay	(Italy) Manuel Jorquera	(Hungary) Gergely Kisgyörgy (Hungary) Kornél Bardóczky	6–7^{(4–7)}, 6–4, 4–6
Loss	2–7	Jul 2004	Recanati, Italy	Challenger	Hard	(Italy) Federico Torresi	(Italy) Massimo Dell'Acqua (Italy) Uros Vico	1–6, 4–6
Loss	2–8	Aug 2004	Saint Petersburg, Russia	Challenger	Clay	(Italy) Simone Vagnozzi	(Russia) Mikhail Elgin (Russia) Andrei Mishin	3–6, 7–5, 4–6
Win	3–8	Sep 2004	Italy F23, Chieti	Futures	Clay	(Italy) Stefano Mocci	(Italy) Luca Bonati (Italy) Francesco Piccari	7–5, 4–6, 6–2
Win	4–8	Sep 2004	Italy F24, Porto Torres	Futures	Hard	(Italy) Stefano Mocci	(Italy) Andrea Stoppini (Italy) Matteo Volante	6–3, 6–4
Win	5–8	Sep 2004	Italy F25, Selargius	Futures	Hard	(Italy) Stefano Mocci	(Italy) Alessandro Piccari (Italy) Francesco Piccari	6–3, 6–7^{(4–7)}, 6–2
Win	6–8	Feb 2005	Italy F1, Trento	Futures	Hard	(Italy) Stefano Galvani	(Italy) Fabio Colangelo (Italy) Alessandro da Col	6–7^{(3–7)}, 6–3, 6–1
Win	7–8	Jul 2005	Italy F22, Rome	Futures	Clay	(Italy) Matteo Volante	(France) Vincent Baudat (France) Nicolas Tourte	7–5, 6–7^{(2–7)}, 6–1
Loss	7–9	Oct 2005	Italy F35, Lecce	Futures	Clay	(Italy) Matteo Volante	(Italy) Leonardo Azzaro (Italy) Giancarlo Petrazzuolo	0–6, 4–6
Loss	7–10	Feb 2006	Italy F1, Bari	Futures	Clay	(Italy) Giancarlo Petrazzuolo	(Italy) Marco Crugnola (Italy) Alessandro da Col	3–6, 3–6
Loss	7–11	Mar 2006	Italy F3, Rome	Futures	Clay	(Italy) Giancarlo Petrazzuolo	(Italy) Simone Vagnozzi (Italy) Alberto Brizzi	7–6^{(7–1)}, 1–6, 2–6
Loss	7–12	Apr 2006	Italy F9, Rome	Futures	Clay	(Italy) Gianluca Naso	(Italy) Marco Di Vuolo (Argentina) Antonio Pastorino	6–7^{(2–7)}, 0–6
Win	8–12	May 2006	Italy F12, Piacenza	Futures	Clay	(France) Ludwig Pellerin	(Italy) Giuseppe Menga (Italy) Alessandro da Col	7–6^{(10–8)}, 7–6^{(9–7)}
Win	9–12	Jun 2006	Italy F19, L'Aquila	Futures	Clay	(Italy) Fabio Colangelo	(Bosnia and Herzegovina) Ismar Gorčić (Italy) Alessandro da Col	6–3, 6–2
Win	10–12	Aug 2006	Trani, Italy	Challenger	Clay	(Italy) Leonardo Azzaro	(Italy) Alessandro Motti (Spain) Daniel Muñoz de la Nava	6–4, 3–6, [10–6]
Win	11–12	Oct 2006	Italy F34, Sassari	Futures	Clay	(Italy) Fabio Colangelo	(Austria) Georg Novak (Austria) Bertram Steinberger	6–1, 6–3
Loss	11–13	Jun 2007	Sassuolo, Italy	Challenger	Clay	(Italy) Andrea Stoppini	(Italy) Giorgio Galimberti (Brazil) Márcio Torres	3–6, 7–6^{(7–2)}, [6–10]
Win	12–13	Jun 2007	Italy F18, Bassano Bresciano	Futures	Clay	(Italy) Fabio Colangelo	(Italy) Marco Di Vuolo (Chile) Hans Podlipnik Castillo	6–2, 6–2
Win	13–13	Aug 2007	Trani, Italy	Challenger	Clay	(Italy) Leonardo Azzaro	(Italy) Alessandro Motti (Italy) Fabio Colangelo	6–2, 7–5
Win	14–13	Sep 2007	Genoa, Italy	Challenger	Clay	(Italy) Simone Vagnozzi	(Italy) Simone Bolelli (Italy) Flavio Cipolla	6–3, 6–1
Win	15–13	Sep 2007	Todi, Italy	Challenger	Clay	(Italy) Alessandro Motti	(Italy) Enrico Burzi (Italy) Stefano Galvani	3–6, 7–5, [10–4]
Loss	15–14	Sep 2007	Italy F32, Olbia	Futures	Clay	(Italy) Leonardo Azzaro	(Italy) Alessandro da Col (Italy) Andrea Stoppini	3–6, 2–6
Win	16–14	Feb 2009	Egypt F1, Cairo	Futures	Clay	(Italy) Simone Vagnozzi	(Morocco) Rabie Chaki (Morocco) Talal Ouahabi	2–6, 6–1, [10–3]
Loss	16–15	Feb 2009	Egypt F2, Cairo	Futures	Clay	(Italy) Simone Vagnozzi	(Egypt) Karim Maamoun (Egypt) Sherif Sabry	1–6, 4–6
Win	17–15	Mar 2009	Italy F3, Rome	Futures	Clay	(Italy) Luca Vanni	(Italy) Damiano Di Ienno (Bosnia and Herzegovina) Ismar Gorčić	2–6, 7–5, [10–8]
Win	18–15	Mar 2009	Italy F4, Rome	Futures	Clay	(Italy) Leonardo Azzaro	(Argentina) Federico Delbonis (Argentina) Nicolas Pastor	6–0, 5–7, [10–3]
Win	19–15	Jun 2009	Italy F13, Bergamo	Futures	Clay	(Italy) Fabio Colangelo	(Argentina) Jonathan Gonzalia (Argentina) Leandro Migani	7–6^{(7–2)}, 6–3
Win	20–15	Feb 2010	Spain F4, Murcia	Futures	Clay	(Italy) Walter Trusendi	(Spain) Pablo Santos González (Spain) Gabriel Trujillo Soler	7–6^{(7–3)}, 6–1
Win	21–15	Feb 2010	Spain F5, Murcia	Futures	Clay	(Italy) Walter Trusendi	(Spain) Pablo Santos González (Spain) Gabriel Trujillo Soler	6–2, 6–3
Win	22–15	Mar 2010	Italy F2, Rome	Futures	Clay	(Italy) Francesco Aldi	(Austria) Andreas Haider-Maurer (Austria) Bertram Steinberger	6–2, 6–4
Loss	22–16	Jul 2010	San Benedetto, Italy	Challenger	Clay	(Italy) Francesco Aldi	(Italy) Thomas Fabbiano (Spain) Gabriel Trujillo Soler	6–7^{(4–7)}, 6–7^{(5–7)}
Win	23–16	Sep 2010	Brașov, Romania	Challenger	Clay	(Italy) Flavio Cipolla	(Moldova) Radu Albot (Moldova) Andrei Ciumac	6–3, 6–4
Win	24–16	Mar 2011	Spain F7, Sabadell	Futures	Clay	(Italy) Simone Vagnozzi	(Spain) Miguel Ángel López Jaén (Spain) Gabriel Trujillo Soler	6–3, 6–2
Loss	24–17	Mar 2011	Caltanissetta, Italy	Challenger	Clay	(Romania) Adrian Ungur	(Italy) Simone Vagnozzi (Italy) Daniele Bracciali	6–3, 6–7^{(2–7)}, [7–10]
Loss	24–18	Jul 2011	San Benedetto, Italy	Challenger	Clay	(Italy) Stefano Travaglia	(Italy) Alessio di Mauro (Italy) Alessandro Motti	6–7^{(3–7)}, 6–4, [7–10]
Win	25–18	Feb 2013	Spain F3, Murcia	Futures	Clay	(Italy) Alberto Brizzi	(Spain) Samuel Corraliza-Moreno (Spain) Alberto Galiano-Hernandez	6–4, 3–6, [10–8]
Win	26–18	Mar 2013	Croatia F4, Poreč	Futures	Clay	(Italy) Alberto Brizzi	(Bolivia) Hugo Dellien (Chile) Felipe Rios	1–6, 7–5, [10–7]
Loss	26–19	Apr 2013	Italy F2, Rome	Futures	Clay	(Italy) Francesco Picco	(Italy) Alessandro Motti (Italy) Matteo Volante	2–6, 3–6
Win	27–19	Jun 2013	Milan, Italy	Challenger	Clay	(Italy) Marco Crugnola	(Australia) Alex Bolt (Chinese Taipei) Peng Hsien-yin	4–6, 7–5, [10–8]
Win	28–19	Jul 2013	Italy F17, Modena	Futures	Clay	(Italy) Omar Giacalone	(Italy) Marco Cecchinato (Italy) Matteo Fago	4–6, 7–6^{(7–5)}, [10–7]
Win	29–19	Aug 2013	Italy F19, La Spezia	Futures	Clay	(Italy) Walter Trusendi	(Italy) Alessandro Bega (Italy) Riccardo Sinicropi	7–5, 6–2
Loss	29–20	Aug 2013	Italy F21, Appiano Gentile	Futures	Clay	(Italy) Matteo Volante	(Chile) Jorge Aguilar (Spain) Juan Lizariturry	6–4, 3–6, [7–10]
Win	30–20	Apr 2014	Croatia F7, Pula	Futures	Clay	(Italy) Matteo Volante	(Croatia) Toni Androić (Croatia) Ivan Blazevic	6–2, 6–2
Loss	30–21	May 2014	Italy F12, Santa Margherita Di Pula	Futures	Clay	(Italy) Matteo Volante	(Italy) Riccardo Sinicropi (Italy) Luca Vanni	6–7^{(3–7)}, 5–7
Loss	30–22	Jun 2014	Italy F16, Cesena	Futures	Clay	(Italy) Matteo Volante	(Italy) Walter Trusendi (Italy) Luca Vanni	4–6, 6–1, [10–12]
Win	31–22	Jul 2014	San Benedetto, Italy	Challenger	Clay	(Italy) Potito Starace	(Bolivia) Hugo Dellien (Peru) Sergio Galdós	6–3, 6–7^{(3–7)}, [10–5]
Win	32–22	Sep 2014	Brașov, Romania	Challenger	Clay	(Romania) Adrian Ungur	(Russia) Aslan Karatsev (Russia) Valery Rudnev	4–6, 7–6^{(7–4)}, [10–1]
Win	33–22	Jun 2015	Italy F12, Lodi	Futures	Clay	(Italy) Matteo Volante	(Italy) Francesco Borgo (Italy) Riccardo Ghedin	7–6^{(7–4)}, 3–6, [10–2]
Loss	33–23	Sep 2015	Croatia F15, Bol	Futures	Clay	(Italy) Francesco Cano	(Croatia) Tomislav Draganja (Croatia) Franjo Raspudic	2–6, 0–6
