= 2023 Viña Challenger – Singles =

Singles
- 2023 Viña Challenger

Final
- Champion: (Brazil) Thiago Seyboth Wild
- Runner-up: (France) Hugo Gaston
- Score: 7–5, 6–1

Events
Singles	Doubles
- Viña Challenger

This was the first edition of the tournament.

Thiago Seyboth Wild won the title after defeating Hugo Gaston 7–5, 6–1 in the final.

== Seeds ==
1. (Bolivia) Hugo Dellien (withdrew)
2. (France) Hugo Gaston (final)
3. (Argentina) Camilo Ugo Carabelli (quarterfinals)
4. (Brazil) Felipe Meligeni Alves (first round)
5. (Italy) Franco Agamenone (first round)
6. (Argentina) Facundo Díaz Acosta (first round, retired)
7. (Italy) Luciano Darderi (first round)
8. (Italy) Riccardo Bonadio (quarterfinals)

== Draw ==
Key

- Q = Qualifier
- WC = Wild card
- LL = Lucky loser
- Alt = Alternate
- ITF = ITF entry
- PR = Protected ranking
- SR = Special ranking
- SE = Special exempt
- JE = Junior exempt
- JR = Junior Accelerator Programme entrant
- CO = College Accelerator Programme entrant
- NG = Next Gen Accelerator Program entrant
- w/o = Walkover
- r = Retired
- d = Defaulted

=== Finals ===
Semifinals
SE	(Brazil) Thiago Seyboth Wild	6	6
(Chile) Tomás Barrios Vera	3	4
(Italy) Andrea Vavassori	6^{1}	2
2	(France) Hugo Gaston	7^{7}	6

Final
SE	(Brazil) Thiago Seyboth Wild	7	6
2	(France) Hugo Gaston	5	1

=== Top half ===
First round
Q	(Brazil) J Pereira	2	6	6
WC	(Chile) Daniel Antonio Núñez	6	2	4
(Italy) A Pellegrino	6	6
LL	(Argentina) G Villanueva	0	2
(Argentina) L Midón	5	2
SE	(Brazil) T Seyboth Wild	7	6
Q	(Brazil) O Luz	4	6	6
5	(Italy) F Agamenone	6	2	2
4	(Brazil) F Meligeni Alves	1	5
(Chile) T Barrios Vera	6	7
(Argentina) M Navone	7	6
(Peru) G Bueno	5	2
Q	(Brazil) M Alves	6^{5}	6	4
(Argentina) JB Torres	7^{7}	3	6
Q	(Spain) Á López San Martín	6	5	6
7	(Italy) L Darderi	2	7	1

Second round
Q	(Brazil) J Pereira	6	2	4
(Italy) A Pellegrino	4	6	6
SE	(Brazil) T Seyboth Wild	6	4	6
Q	(Brazil) O Luz	1	6	4
(Chile) T Barrios Vera	2	6	7^{7}
(Argentina) M Navone	6	4	6^{5}
(Argentina) JB Torres	6	4	2
Q	(Spain) Á López San Martín	4	6	6

Quarterfinals
(Italy) A Pellegrino	6	4	3
SE	(Brazil) T Seyboth Wild	3	6	6
(Chile) T Barrios Vera	7	6
Q	(Spain) Á López San Martín	5	4

Semifinals
SE	(Brazil) T Seyboth Wild	6	6
(Chile) T Barrios Vera	3	4

=== Bottom half ===
First round
6	(Argentina) F Díaz Acosta	1	3^{r}
(Argentina) TA Tirante	6	4
Q	(Brazil) Wilson Leite	1	4
(Italy) A Vavassori	6	6
(Argentina) H Casanova	6	6
(Argentina) RA Burruchaga	3	3
(Argentina) GA Olivieri	6	4	3
3	(Argentina) C Ugo Carabelli	1	6	6
8	(Italy) R Bonadio	6	6
WC	(Chile) Miguel Fernando Pereira	4	1
(Argentina) N Kicker	1	0^{r}
Alt	(Spain) P Martín Tiffon	6	3
(Argentina) A Collarini	4	5
Q	(Italy) F Gaio	6	7
WC	(Chile) G Lama	1	4
2	(France) H Gaston	6	6

Second round
(Argentina) TA Tirante	3	3
(Italy) A Vavassori	6	6
(Argentina) H Casanova	3	6	3
3	(Argentina) C Ugo Carabelli	6	4	6
8	(Italy) R Bonadio	6	5	6
Alt	(Spain) P Martín Tiffon	4	7	4
Q	(Italy) F Gaio	4	0^{r}
2	(France) H Gaston	6	0

Quarterfinals
(Italy) A Vavassori	7^{7}	6
3	(Argentina) C Ugo Carabelli	6^{5}	4
8	(Italy) R Bonadio	2	7	3
2	(France) H Gaston	6	5	6

Semifinals
(Italy) A Vavassori	6^{1}	2
2	(France) H Gaston	7^{7}	6
