= 2023 Viña Challenger – Doubles =

Doubles
- 2023 Viña Challenger

Final
- Champions: (Ecuador) Diego Hidalgo (Colombia) Cristian Rodríguez
- Runners-up: (Italy) Luciano Darderi (Italy) Andrea Vavassori
- Score: 6–4, 7–6^{(7–5)}

Events
Singles	Doubles
- Viña Challenger

This was the first edition of the tournament.

Diego Hidalgo and Cristian Rodríguez won the title after defeating Luciano Darderi and Andrea Vavassori 6–4, 7–6^{(7–5)} in the final.

== Seeds ==
1. (Ecuador) Diego Hidalgo / (Colombia) Cristian Rodríguez (champions)
2. (Italy) Luciano Darderi / (Italy) Andrea Vavassori (final)
3. (Philippines) Ruben Gonzales / (Brazil) Fernando Romboli (quarterfinals)
4. (Brazil) Orlando Luz / (Brazil) Marcelo Zormann (semifinals)

== Draw ==
Key

- Q = Qualifier
- WC = Wild card
- LL = Lucky loser
- Alt = Alternate
- ITF = ITF entry
- PR = Protected ranking
- SR = Special ranking
- SE = Special exempt
- JE = Junior exempt
- JR = Junior Accelerator Programme entrant
- CO = College Accelerator Programme entrant
- NG = Next Gen Accelerator Program entrant
- w/o = Walkover
- r = Retired
- d = Defaulted

First round
1	(Ecuador) D Hidalgo (Colombia) C Rodríguez	w/o
(Italy) F Agamenone (Argentina) H Casanova
Alt	(Brazil) Wilson Leite (Brazil) J Pereira	4	4
(Spain) A López San Martín (Spain) P Martín Tiffon	6	6
4	(Brazil) O Luz (Brazil) M Zormann	6^{6}	6	[11]
(Argentina) TA Tirante (Argentina) JB Torres	7^{8}	4	[9]
WC	(Chile) Daniel Antonio Núñez (Chile) Sebastián Santibáñez	6	2	[10]
WC	(Chile) Benjamín Torres (Chile) Nicolás Villalón	4	6	[5]
(Italy) R Bonadio (Italy) A Pellegrino	3	6^{4}
3	(Philippines) R Gonzales (Brazil) F Romboli	6	7^{7}
(Peru) A Huertas del Pino (Peru) C Huertas del Pino	3	5
(Brazil) D Dutra da Silva (Argentina) G Villanueva	6	7
(Chile) T Barrios Vera (Chile) G Lama	1	7^{7}	[8]
2	(Italy) L Darderi (Italy) A Vavassori	6	6^{2}	[10]

Quarterfinals
1	(Ecuador) D Hidalgo (Colombia) C Rodríguez	w/o
(Spain) A López San Martín (Spain) P Martín Tiffon
4	(Brazil) O Luz (Brazil) M Zormann	6	6
(United Kingdom) Elbert Barr (Argentina) C Ugo Carabelli	3	4
WC	(Chile) DA Núñez (Chile) S Santibáñez	3	7^{7}	[10]
3	(Philippines) R Gonzales (Brazil) F Romboli	6	6^{5}	[8]
(Brazil) D Dutra da Silva (Argentina) G Villanueva	6^{5}	4
2	(Italy) L Darderi (Italy) A Vavassori	7^{7}	6

Semifinals
1	(Ecuador) D Hidalgo (Colombia) C Rodríguez	6	6
4	(Brazil) O Luz (Brazil) M Zormann	4	0
WC	(Chile) DA Núñez (Chile) S Santibáñez	1	3
2	(Italy) L Darderi (Italy) A Vavassori	6	6

Final
1	(Ecuador) D Hidalgo (Colombia) C Rodríguez	6	7^{7}
2	(Italy) L Darderi (Italy) A Vavassori	4	6^{5}
