= 2023 Viña Challenger =

- Date: 13–19 March
- Edition: 1st
- Surface: Clay
- Location: Viña del Mar, Chile

Champions

Singles
- (Brazil) Thiago Seyboth Wild

Doubles
- (Ecuador) Diego Hidalgo / (Colombia) Cristian Rodríguez
- Viña Challenger

The 2023 Viña Challenger Tennis was a professional tennis tournament played on clay courts. It was the first edition of the tournament which was part of the 2023 ATP Challenger Tour. It took place in Viña del Mar, Chile between 13 and 19 March 2023.

== Singles main draw entrants ==
=== Seeds ===
Country	Player	Rank^{1}	Seed
~~BOL~~	~~Hugo Dellien~~	~~99~~	~~1~~
FRA	Hugo Gaston	106	2
ARG	Camilo Ugo Carabelli	124	3
BRA	Felipe Meligeni Alves	164	4
ITA	Franco Agamenone	166	5
ARG	Facundo Díaz Acosta	172	6
ITA	Luciano Darderi	180	7
ITA	Riccardo Bonadio	182	8

- ^{1} Rankings are as of 6 March 2023.

=== Other entrants ===
The following players received wildcards into the singles main draw:

- (Chile) Gonzalo Lama
- (Chile) Daniel Antonio Núñez
- (Chile) Miguel Fernando Pereira

The following player received entry into the singles main draw as a special exempt:

- (Brazil) Thiago Seyboth Wild

The following player received entry into the singles main draw as an alternate:

- (Spain) Pol Martín Tiffon

The following players received entry from the qualifying draw:

- (Brazil) Mateus Alves
- (Italy) Federico Gaio
- (Brazil) Wilson Leite
- (Spain) Álvaro López San Martín
- (Brazil) Orlando Luz
- (Brazil) José Pereira

The following player received entry as a lucky loser:

- (Argentina) Gonzalo Villanueva

== Champions ==
=== Singles ===
- (Brazil) Thiago Seyboth Wild def. (France) Hugo Gaston 7–5, 6–1.

=== Doubles ===
- (Ecuador) Diego Hidalgo / (Colombia) Cristian Rodríguez def. (Italy) Luciano Darderi / (Italy) Andrea Vavassori 6–4, 7–6^{(7–5)}.
