= 2025 BNP Paribas Open – Men's singles =

Tennis tournament event

Men's singles
- 2025 BNP Paribas Open

Final
- Champion: (United Kingdom) Jack Draper
- Runner-up: (Denmark) Holger Rune
- Score: 6–2, 6–2

Details
- Draw: 96 (12 Q / 8 WC )
- Seeds: 32

Events
Singles	men	women
Doubles	men	women	mixed
- Indian Wells Open

Jack Draper defeated Holger Rune in the final, 6–2, 6–2 to win the men's singles tennis title at the 2025 Indian Wells Open. It was his first Masters 1000 title and third career ATP Tour title. Draper was the second British man to win the title, after Cameron Norrie in 2021. By winning the title, Draper made his debut in the top 10 of the ATP rankings. The final marked the first Masters 1000 singles final to be contested by two players born in the 2000s.

World No. 1 Jannik Sinner would miss the Indian Wells tournament for the first time in his career as he served a 3-month ban from the World Anti-Doping Agency (WADA) from 9 February to 4 May. Sinner was replaced in the draw by his compatriot Luca Nardi.

Carlos Alcaraz was the two-time defending champion, but lost in the semifinals to Draper.

This edition marked the first time five American men reached the fourth round at the tournament in 21 years. One of those men, Ben Shelton became the youngest American to reach the quarterfinals since Andy Roddick in 2004. Ranked No. 349 in the world and using a protected ranking to enter the qualifying draw, Yosuke Watanuki was the lowest ranked player to reach the fourth round of the tournament since Tommy Haas (ranked No. 882 at the time) also in 2004.

== Seeds ==
All seeds received a bye into the second round.

1. (Germany) Alexander Zverev (second round)
2. (Spain) Carlos Alcaraz (semifinals)
3. (United States) Taylor Fritz (fourth round)
4. (Norway) Casper Ruud (second round)
5. Daniil Medvedev (semifinals)
6. (Serbia) Novak Djokovic (second round)
7. Andrey Rublev (second round)
8. (Greece) Stefanos Tsitsipas (fourth round)
9. (Australia) Alex de Minaur (fourth round)
10. (United States) Tommy Paul (fourth round)
11. (United States) Ben Shelton (quarterfinals)
12. (Denmark) Holger Rune (final)
13. (United Kingdom) Jack Draper (champion)
14. (Bulgaria) Grigor Dimitrov (fourth round)
15. (Italy) Lorenzo Musetti (third round)
16. (United States) Frances Tiafoe (third round)
17. (Canada) Félix Auger-Aliassime (second round)
18. (France) Ugo Humbert (third round)
19. (Czech Republic) Tomáš Macháč (second round, retired)
20. (France) Arthur Fils (quarterfinals)
21. (Poland) Hubert Hurkacz (third round)
22. Karen Khachanov (third round)
23. (Czech Republic) Jiří Lehečka (second round)
24. (United States) Sebastian Korda (second round)
25. (Argentina) Francisco Cerúndolo (quarterfinals)
26. (Australia) Alexei Popyrin (third round)
27. (Canada) Denis Shapovalov (third round)
28. (Italy) Matteo Berrettini (third round)
29. (France) Giovanni Mpetshi Perricard (third round)
30. (Chile) Alejandro Tabilo (third round)
31. (United States) Alex Michelsen (third round, retired)
32. (United States) Brandon Nakashima (fourth round)

Click on the seed number of a player to go to their draw section.

== Draw ==
Key

- Q = Qualifier
- WC = Wild card
- LL = Lucky loser
- Alt = Alternate
- ITF = ITF entry
- PR = Protected ranking
- SR = Special ranking
- SE = Special exempt
- JE = Junior exempt
- JR = Junior Accelerator Programme entrant
- CO = College Accelerator Programme entrant
- NG = Next Gen Accelerator Program entrant
- w/o = Walkover
- r = Retired
- d = Defaulted

=== Finals ===
Quarterfinals
(Netherlands) Tallon Griekspoor	7	0	3
12	(Denmark) Holger Rune	5	6	6
20	(France) Arthur Fils	4	6	6^{7}
5	Daniil Medvedev	6	2	7^{9}
11	(United States) Ben Shelton	4	5
13	(United Kingdom) Jack Draper	6	7
25	(Argentina) Francisco Cerúndolo	3	6^{4}
2	(Spain) Carlos Alcaraz	6	7^{7}

Semifinals
12	(Denmark) Holger Rune	7	6
5	Daniil Medvedev	5	4
13	(United Kingdom) Jack Draper	6	0	6
2	(Spain) Carlos Alcaraz	1	6	4

Final
12	(Denmark) Holger Rune	2	2
13	(United Kingdom) Jack Draper	6	6

=== Top half ===
==== Section 1 ====
First round
(Serbia) M Kecmanović	7^{7}	4	3
(Netherlands) T Griekspoor	6^{5}	6	6
(Hungary) F Marozsán	6	6
(Spain) P Martínez	3	2
(Kazakhstan) A Bublik	3	6	3
Q	(Japan) Y Watanuki	6	3	6
(Spain) R Bautista Agut	4	6	6^{4}
Q	(Bosnia and Herzegovina) D Džumhur	6	1	7^{7}

Second round
1	(Germany) A Zverev	6	6^{5}	6^{4}
(Netherlands) T Griekspoor	4	7^{7}	7^{7}
(Hungary) F Marozsán	4	0^{r}
29	(France) G Mpetshi Perricard	6	0
19	(Czech Republic) T Macháč	6	2^{r}
Q	(Japan) Y Watanuki	4	4
Q	(Bosnia and Herzegovina) D Džumhur	6^{4}	6^{7}
16	(United States) F Tiafoe	7^{7}	7^{9}

Third round
(Netherlands) T Griekspoor	7^{7}	6
29	(France) G Mpetshi Perricard	6^{3}	3
Q	(Japan) Y Watanuki	6	7^{8}
16	(United States) F Tiafoe	4	6^{6}

Fourth round
(Netherlands) T Griekspoor	7^{7}	6
Q	(Japan) Y Watanuki	6^{4}	1

==== Section 2 ====
First round
(France) C Moutet	6	4	6
(Australia) J Thompson	4	6	3
(Spain) J Munar	2	7	6^{3}
(Japan) K Nishikori	6	5	7^{7}
(Spain) R Carballés Baena	3	6	1
(Australia) C O'Connell	6	0	6
(Brazil) T Seyboth Wild	4	7	7^{8}
(France) A Müller	6	5	6^{6}

Second round
12	(Denmark) H Rune	6	6
(France) C Moutet	2	4
(Japan) K Nishikori	4	3
18	(France) U Humbert	6	6
28	(Italy) M Berrettini	6	7^{7}
(Australia) C O'Connell	2	6^{2}
(Brazil) T Seyboth Wild	2	4
8	(Greece) S Tsitsipas	6	6

Third round
12	(Denmark) H Rune	5	6	7
18	(France) U Humbert	7	4	5
28	(Italy) M Berrettini	3	3
8	(Greece) S Tsitsipas	6	6

Fourth round
12	(Denmark) H Rune	6	6
8	(Greece) S Tsitsipas	4	4

==== Section 3 ====
First round
(United States) M Giron	7	7^{7}
Q	(Georgia (country)) N Basilashvili	5	6^{3}
(Belgium) Z Bergs	7^{7}	6
Q	(United States) E Quinn	6^{2}	3
(China) Z Zhang	6	2	6^{7}
LL	(Canada) G Diallo	2	6	7^{9}
R Safiullin	7	6
WC	(United States) R Opelka	5	4

Second round
4	(Norway) C Ruud	6^{4}	6	2
(United States) M Giron	7^{7}	3	6
(Belgium) Z Bergs	6^{4}	5
26	(Australia) A Popyrin	7^{7}	7
20	(France) A Fils	6	6
LL	(Canada) G Diallo	2	2
R Safiullin	5	7	2
15	(Italy) L Musetti	7	5	6

Third round
(United States) M Giron	5	6	6
26	(Australia) A Popyrin	7	3	3
20	(France) A Fils	3	7^{7}	6
15	(Italy) L Musetti	6	6^{4}	3

Fourth round
(United States) M Giron	2	6	3
20	(France) A Fils	6	2	6

==== Section 4 ====
First round
WC	(United States) T Boyer	4	6	7^{7}
(Australia) A Vukic	6	2	6^{4}
(United Kingdom) C Norrie	6	6
(Italy) L Nardi	0	3
Q	(United States) C Smith	3	6	6
(Italy) F Cobolli	6	2	2
(China) Y Bu	7	6
WC	(United States) N Basavareddy	5	4

Second round
10	(United States) T Paul	6	6
WC	(United States) T Boyer	3	1
(United Kingdom) C Norrie	3	6	7
23	(Czech Republic) J Lehečka	6	4	5
31	(United States) A Michelsen	6	6
Q	(United States) C Smith	3	4
(China) Y Bu	2	2
5	D Medvedev	6	6

Third round
10	(United States) T Paul	6	7
(United Kingdom) C Norrie	3	5
31	(United States) A Michelsen	0^{r}
5	D Medvedev	2

Fourth round
10	(United States) T Paul	4	0
5	D Medvedev	6	6

=== Bottom half ===
==== Section 5 ====
First round
(Italy) M Arnaldi	6	5	6
(United States) A Kovacevic	3	7	4
(Kazakhstan) A Shevchenko	1	3
(Australia) R Hijikata	6	6
(Argentina) TM Etcheverry	4	6^{6}
(Czech Republic) J Menšík	6	7^{8}
(Argentina) M Navone	7	6
(United States) L Tien	5	4

Second round
7	A Rublev	4	5
(Italy) M Arnaldi	6	7
(Australia) R Hijikata	5	1
32	(United States) B Nakashima	7	6
22	K Khachanov	3	6	6
(Czech Republic) J Menšík	6	0	3
(Argentina) M Navone	3	2
11	(United States) B Shelton	6	6

Third round
(Italy) M Arnaldi	2	4
32	(United States) B Nakashima	6	6
22	K Khachanov	3	5
11	(United States) B Shelton	6	7

Fourth round
32	(United States) B Nakashima	6^{6}	1
11	(United States) B Shelton	7^{8}	6

==== Section 6 ====
First round
(United Kingdom) J Fearnley	2	6	3
WC	(Brazil) J Fonseca	6	1	6
(France) B Bonzi	6	5	5
PR	(United States) J Brooksby	1	7	7
Q	(Australia) L Tu	2	0
(Serbia) D Lajović	6	6
Q	(Italy) M Gigante	3	6	6
(Argentina) S Báez	6	1	4

Second round
13	(United Kingdom) J Draper	6	6
WC	(Brazil) J Fonseca	4	0
PR	(United States) J Brooksby	6	6
17	(Canada) F Auger-Aliassime	4	2
30	(Chile) A Tabilo	6	7
(Serbia) D Lajović	3	5
Q	(Italy) M Gigante	3	5
3	(United States) T Fritz	6	7

Third round
13	(United Kingdom) J Draper	7	6
PR	(United States) J Brooksby	5	4
30	(Chile) A Tabilo	6	3	1
3	(United States) T Fritz	4	6	6

Fourth round
13	(United Kingdom) J Draper	7	6
3	(United States) T Fritz	5	4

==== Section 7 ====
First round
LL	(Netherlands) B van de Zandschulp	7^{9}	3
PR	(Australia) N Kyrgios	6^{7}	0^{r}
WC	(United States) M McDonald	2	6	6
(Spain) A Davidovich Fokina	6	3	2
(Italy) L Darderi	3	3
Q	(France) H Gaston	6	6
(Belgium) D Goffin	6	7
(Italy) L Sonego	4	5

Second round
6	(Serbia) N Djokovic	2	6	1
LL	(Netherlands) B van de Zandschulp	6	3	6
WC	(United States) M McDonald	6	6^{3}	1
25	(Argentina) F Cerúndolo	4	7^{7}	6
21	(Poland) H Hurkacz	7	6
Q	(France) H Gaston	5	3
(Belgium) D Goffin	2	2
9	(Australia) A de Minaur	6	6

Third round
LL	(Netherlands) B van de Zandschulp	3	4
25	(Argentina) F Cerúndolo	6	6
21	(Poland) H Hurkacz	4	0
9	(Australia) A de Minaur	6	6

Fourth round
25	(Argentina) F Cerúndolo	7	6
9	(Australia) A de Minaur	5	3

==== Section 8 ====
First round
(France) A Rinderknech	1	7	2
(Portugal) N Borges	6	5	6
(Germany) J-L Struff	4	4
(France) G Monfils	6	6
Q	(Italy) G Zeppieri	5	1
Q	(Australia) A Walton	7	6
(France) Q Halys	6	6
Q	(Spain) P Carreño Busta	3	4

Second round
14	(Bulgaria) G Dimitrov	6	6
(Portugal) N Borges	3	4
(France) G Monfils	7^{7}	7^{7}
24	(United States) S Korda	6^{2}	6^{4}
27	(Canada) D Shapovalov	6	6
Q	(Australia) A Walton	3	2
(France) Q Halys	4	2
2	(Spain) C Alcaraz	6	6

Third round
14	(Bulgaria) G Dimitrov	7^{7}	4	7^{7}
(France) G Monfils	6^{4}	6	6^{2}
27	(Canada) D Shapovalov	2	4
2	(Spain) C Alcaraz	6	6

Fourth round
14	(Bulgaria) G Dimitrov	1	1
2	(Spain) C Alcaraz	6	6

== Seeded players ==
^{‡}	Champion
^{†}	Runner-up

The following are the seeded players. Seedings are based on ATP rankings as of 3 March 2025. Rankings and points before are as of 3 March 2025.

Seed	Rank	Player	Points before	Points defending	Points earned	Points after	Status
1	2	(Germany) Alexander Zverev	8,135	200	10	7,945	Second round lost to (Netherlands) Tallon Griekspoor
2	3	(Spain) Carlos Alcaraz	7,510	1,000	400	6,910	Semifinals lost to (United Kingdom) Jack Draper [13]
3	4	(United States) Taylor Fritz	4,900	100	100	4,900	Fourth round lost to (United Kingdom) Jack Draper [13]
4	5	(Norway) Casper Ruud	4,045	200	10	3,855	Second round lost to (United States) Marcos Giron
5	6	Daniil Medvedev	3,930	650	400	3,680	Semifinals lost to (Denmark) Holger Rune [12]
6	7	(Serbia) Novak Djokovic	3,900	50	10	3,860	Second round lost to (Netherlands) Botic van de Zandschulp [LL]
7	8	Andrey Rublev	3,480	50	10	3,440	Second round lost to (Italy) Matteo Arnaldi
8	9	(Greece) Stefanos Tsitsipas	3,405	100	100	3,405	Fourth round lost to (Denmark) Holger Rune [12]
9	10	(Australia) Alex de Minaur	3,335	100	100	3,335	Fourth round lost to (Argentina) Francisco Cerúndolo [25]
10	11	(United States) Tommy Paul	3,330	400	100	3,030	Fourth round lost to Daniil Medvedev [5]
11	12	(United States) Ben Shelton	2,880	100	200	2,980	Quarterfinals lost to (United Kingdom) Jack Draper [13]
12	13	(Denmark) Holger Rune ^{†}	2,820	200	650	3,270	Runner-up, lost to (United Kingdom) Jack Draper [13]
13	14	(United Kingdom) Jack Draper ^{‡}	2,810	10	1,000	3,800	Champion, defeated (Denmark) Holger Rune [12]
14	15	(Bulgaria) Grigor Dimitrov	2,745	100	100	2,745	Fourth round lost to (Spain) Carlos Alcaraz [2]
15	16	(Italy) Lorenzo Musetti	2,650	50	50	2,650	Third round lost to (France) Arthur Fils [20]
16	17	(United States) Frances Tiafoe	2,485	50	50	2,485	Third round lost to (Japan) Yosuke Watanuki [Q]
17	18	(Canada) Félix Auger-Aliassime	2,455	50	10	2,415	Second round lost to (United States) Jenson Brooksby [PR]
18	19	(France) Ugo Humbert	2,375	50	50	2,375	Third round lost to (Denmark) Holger Rune [12]
19	20	(Czech Republic) Tomáš Macháč	2,330	30	10	2,310	Second round retired against (Japan) Yosuke Watanuki [Q]
20	21	(France) Arthur Fils	2,330	50	200	2,480	Quarterfinals lost to Daniil Medvedev [5]
21	22	(Poland) Hubert Hurkacz	2,165	10	50	2,205	Third round lost to (Australia) Alex de Minaur [9]
22	23	Karen Khachanov	1,960	10	50	2,000	Third round lost to (United States) Ben Shelton [11]
23	24	(Czech Republic) Jiří Lehečka	1,935	200	10	1,745	Second round lost to (United Kingdom) Cameron Norrie
24	25	(United States) Sebastian Korda	1,900	50	10	1,860	Second round lost to (France) Gaël Monfils
25	26	(Argentina) Francisco Cerúndolo	1,775	50	200	1,925	Quarterfinals lost to (Spain) Carlos Alcaraz [2]
26	27	(Australia) Alexei Popyrin	1,750	0	50	1,800	Third round lost to (United States) Marcos Giron
27	28	(Canada) Denis Shapovalov	1,696	30	50	1,716	Third round lost to (Spain) Carlos Alcaraz [2]
28	29	(Italy) Matteo Berrettini	1,620	(90)^{§}	50	1,580	Third round lost to (Greece) Stefanos Tsitsipas [8]
29	30	(France) Giovanni Mpetshi Perricard	1,616	(10)^{‡}	50	1,656	Third round lost to (Netherlands) Tallon Griekspoor
30	31	(Chile) Alejandro Tabilo	1,535	30	50	1,555	Third round lost to (United States) Taylor Fritz [3]
31	32	(United States) Alex Michelsen	1,445	30	50	1,465	Third round retired against Daniil Medvedev [5]
32	33	(United States) Brandon Nakashima	1,430	30	100	1,500	Fourth round lost to (United States) Ben Shelton [11]

‡ The player did not qualify for the main draw in 2024. Points for his 19th best result will be deducted instead.
§ The player did not qualify for the main draw in 2024. He is defending points from an ATP Challenger Tour event (Phoenix) instead.

== Other entry information ==
=== Wildcards ===
- (United States) Nishesh Basavareddy
- (United States) Tristan Boyer
- (Brazil) João Fonseca
- (United States) Mackenzie McDonald
- (United States) Reilly Opelka

=== Protected ranking ===
- (United States) Jenson Brooksby
- (Australia) Nick Kyrgios

=== Withdrawals ===
- † (Argentina) Facundo Díaz Acosta → replaced by (Netherlands) Botic van de Zandschulp (LL)
- ‡ (Chile) Nicolás Jarry → replaced by (United States) Learner Tien
- ‡ (Australia) Thanasi Kokkinakis → replaced by (Serbia) Dušan Lajović
- † (Poland) Kamil Majchrzak → replaced by (Canada) Gabriel Diallo (LL)
- ‡ (Japan) Yoshihito Nishioka → replaced by (Australia) Christopher O'Connell
- § (United States) Reilly Opelka → replaced by (United Kingdom) Jacob Fearnley
- ‡ (China) Shang Juncheng → replaced by (Kazakhstan) Alexander Shevchenko
- ‡ (Italy) Jannik Sinner → replaced by (Italy) Luca Nardi

‡ – withdrew from entry list
§ – withdrew from entry list using protected ranking and received wildcard
† – withdrew from main draw

== Qualifying ==
=== Seeds ===
1. (Italy) Mattia Bellucci (first round)
2. (Germany) Daniel Altmaier (first round)
3. (Netherlands) Botic van de Zandschulp (qualifying competition, lucky loser)
4. (Canada) Gabriel Diallo (qualifying competition, lucky loser)
5. (Bosnia and Herzegovina) Damir Džumhur (qualified)
6. (France) Hugo Gaston (qualified)
7. (Italy) Fabio Fognini (first round)
8. (Australia) James Duckworth (qualifying competition)
9. (Australia) Adam Walton (qualified)
10. (Chinese Taipei) Tseng Chun-hsin (first round)
11. (France) Arthur Cazaux (first round)
12. (United States) Christopher Eubanks (first round)
13. Pavel Kotov (qualifying competition)
14. (United Kingdom) Billy Harris (first round)
15. (Spain) Pablo Carreño Busta (qualified)
16. (Poland) Kamil Majchrzak (qualified, withdrew)
17. (Japan) Taro Daniel (first round)
18. (Slovakia) Jozef Kovalík (first round)
19. (France) Adrian Mannarino (first round)
20. (Australia) Tristan Schoolkate (first round)
21. (Argentina) Federico Agustín Gómez (first round)
22. (United States) Mitchell Krueger (first round)
23. (Kazakhstan) Mikhail Kukushkin (qualifying competition)
24. (South Africa) Lloyd Harris (first round)

=== Qualifiers ===
1. (Japan) Yosuke Watanuki
2. (Poland) Kamil Majchrzak (withdrew)
3. (Italy) Matteo Gigante
4. (United States) Ethan Quinn
5. (Bosnia and Herzegovina) Damir Džumhur
6. (France) Hugo Gaston
7. (United States) Colton Smith
8. (Australia) Li Tu
9. (Australia) Adam Walton
10. (Italy) Giulio Zeppieri
11. (Spain) Pablo Carreño Busta
12. (Georgia (country)) Nikoloz Basilashvili

=== Lucky losers ===
1. (Netherlands) Botic van de Zandschulp
2. (Canada) Gabriel Diallo

=== Qualifying draw ===
==== First qualifier ====
First round
1	(Italy) Mattia Bellucci	1	2
PR	(Japan) Yosuke Watanuki	6	6
WC	(United States) Rudy Quan	6	7
21	(Argentina) Federico Agustín Gómez	4	5

Qualifying competition
PR	(Japan) Yosuke Watanuki	6	6
WC	(United States) Rudy Quan	3	2

==== Second qualifier ====
First round
2	(Germany) Daniel Altmaier	5	4
(Chile) Cristian Garín	7	6
WC	(United States) Trevor Svajda	3	1
16	(Poland) Kamil Majchrzak	6	6

Qualifying competition
(Chile) Cristian Garín	6^{0}	2
16	(Poland) Kamil Majchrzak	7^{7}	6

==== Third qualifier ====
First round
3	(Netherlands) Botic van de Zandschulp	5	6	6
(Slovakia) Lukáš Klein	7	3	3
(Italy) Matteo Gigante	6	6
22	(United States) Mitchell Krueger	4	2

Qualifying competition
3	(Netherlands) Botic van de Zandschulp	5	0
(Italy) Matteo Gigante	7	6

==== Fourth qualifier ====
First round
4	(Canada) Gabriel Diallo	6	7^{7}
(Lebanon) Hady Habib	3	6^{5}
(United States) Ethan Quinn	6	6^{6}	6
20	(Australia) Tristan Schoolkate	4	7^{8}	3

Qualifying competition
4	(Canada) Gabriel Diallo	6^{5}	2
(United States) Ethan Quinn	7^{7}	6

==== Fifth qualifier ====
First round
5	(Bosnia and Herzegovina) Damir Džumhur	6	6
(United States) Brandon Holt	4	2
(Moldova) Radu Albot	3	6	6
17	(Japan) Taro Daniel	6	2	4

Qualifying competition
5	(Bosnia and Herzegovina) Damir Džumhur	6	6
(Moldova) Radu Albot	4	3

==== Sixth qualifier ====
First round
6	(France) Hugo Gaston	6	6
(Japan) James Trotter	2	4
WC	(United States) Eliot Spizzirri	6	6
24	(South Africa) Lloyd Harris	4	3

Qualifying competition
6	(France) Hugo Gaston	6	6
WC	(United States) Eliot Spizzirri	0	1

==== Seventh qualifier ====
First round
7	(Italy) Fabio Fognini	3	4
WC	(United States) Colton Smith	6	6
(Hong Kong) Coleman Wong	6^{5}	7	1
13	Pavel Kotov	7^{7}	5	6

Qualifying competition
WC	(United States) Colton Smith	6	7^{10}
13	Pavel Kotov	3	6^{8}

==== Eighth qualifier ====
First round
8	(Australia) James Duckworth	7^{7}	7^{7}
(France) Térence Atmane	6^{5}	6^{4}
(Australia) Li Tu	6	6
19	(France) Adrian Mannarino	3	4

Qualifying competition
8	(Australia) James Duckworth	4	2
(Australia) Li Tu	6	6

==== Ninth qualifier ====
First round
9	(Australia) Adam Walton	7	6
(France) Constant Lestienne	5	4
PR	(United States) Michael Mmoh	6	6
14	(United Kingdom) Billy Harris	3	2

Qualifying competition
9	(Australia) Adam Walton	6	2	6
PR	(United States) Michael Mmoh	4	6	1

==== Tenth qualifier ====
First round
10	(Chinese Taipei) Tseng Chun-hsin	2	1
PR	(Italy) Giulio Zeppieri	6	6
WC	(France) Théo Papamalamis	4	7^{7}	5
23	(Kazakhstan) Mikhail Kukushkin	6	6^{4}	7

Qualifying competition
PR	(Italy) Giulio Zeppieri	7^{8}	6
23	(Kazakhstan) Mikhail Kukushkin	6^{6}	2

==== Eleventh qualifier ====
First round
11	(France) Arthur Cazaux	4	6	4
(Canada) Alexis Galarneau	6	4	6
(United States) Zachary Svajda	6	3	6^{7}
15	(Spain) Pablo Carreño Busta	1	6	7^{9}

Qualifying competition
(Canada) Alexis Galarneau	6^{3}	3
15	(Spain) Pablo Carreño Busta	7^{7}	6

==== Twelfth qualifier ====
First round
12	(United States) Christopher Eubanks	2	4
(Georgia (country)) Nikoloz Basilashvili	6	6
(Japan) Yasutaka Uchiyama	6	6
18	(Slovakia) Jozef Kovalík	4	4

Qualifying competition
(Georgia (country)) Nikoloz Basilashvili	6	3	6
(Japan) Yasutaka Uchiyama	4	6	3
