= 2025 BNP Paribas Open – Mixed doubles =

Tennis tournament event

Mixed doubles
- 2025 BNP Paribas Open

Final
- Champions: (Italy) Sara Errani (Italy) Andrea Vavassori
- Runners-up: (United States) Bethanie Mattek-Sands (Croatia) Mate Pavić
- Score: 6–7^{(3–7)}, 6–3, [10–8]
- Date: 14 March 2025

Details
- Draw: 12

Events
Singles	men	women
Doubles	men	women	mixed
- Indian Wells Open

Sara Errani and Andrea Vavassori won the mixed doubles invitational at the 2025 BNP Paribas Open, defeating Bethanie Mattek-Sands and Mate Pavić in the final, 6–7^{(3–7)}, 6–3, [10–8].

Storm Hunter and Matthew Ebden were the defending champions, but lost in the first round to Diana Shnaider and John Peers.

== Seeds ==
All seeds received a bye into the quarterfinals.

1. (Italy) Sara Errani / (Italy) Andrea Vavassori (champions)
2. (New Zealand) Erin Routliffe / (New Zealand) Michael Venus (quarterfinals)
3. (United States) Bethanie Mattek-Sands / (Croatia) Mate Pavić (final)
4. (United States) Desirae Krawczyk / (United Kingdom) Neal Skupski (semifinals)

== Draw ==
Key

- Q = Qualifier
- WC = Wild card
- LL = Lucky loser
- Alt = Alternate
- ITF = ITF entry
- PR = Protected ranking
- SR = Special ranking
- SE = Special exempt
- JE = Junior exempt
- JR = Junior Accelerator Programme entrant
- CO = College Accelerator Programme entrant
- NG = Next Gen Accelerator Program entrant
- w/o = Walkover
- r = Retired
- d = Defaulted

=== Draw ===
First round
(Netherlands) D Schuurs (India) R Bopanna	6^{6}	2
(Hungary) T Babos (El Salvador) M Arévalo	7^{8}	6
L Samsonova (Italy) S Bolelli	4	0
WC	(Canada) C Branstine (Croatia) N Mektić	6	6
(United States) N Melichar-Martinez; A Rublev	6	7
(Norway) U Eikeri (Norway) C Ruud	3	5
D Shnaider (Australia) J Peers	6	3	[10]
WC	(Australia) S Hunter (Australia) M Ebden	3	6	[3]

Quarterfinals
1	(Italy) S Errani (Italy) A Vavassori	6	6^{2}	[10]
(Hungary) T Babos (El Salvador) M Arévalo	3	7^{7}	[7]
4	(United States) D Krawczyk (United Kingdom) N Skupski	6	7
WC	(Canada) C Branstine (Croatia) N Mektić	3	5
(United States) N Melichar-Martinez; A Rublev	6	6^{6}	[4]
3	(United States) B Mattek-Sands (Croatia) M Pavić	4	7^{8}	[10]
D Shnaider (Australia) J Peers	7^{7}	6
2	(New Zealand) E Routliffe (New Zealand) M Venus	6^{4}	2

Semifinals
1	(Italy) S Errani (Italy) A Vavassori	7^{7}	6
4	(United States) D Krawczyk (United Kingdom) N Skupski	6^{3}	3
3	(United States) B Mattek-Sands (Croatia) M Pavić	6	4	[13]
D Shnaider (Australia) J Peers	2	6	[11]

Final
1	(Italy) S Errani (Italy) A Vavassori	6^{3}	6	[10]
3	(United States) B Mattek-Sands (Croatia) M Pavić	7^{7}	3	[8]
