= 2025 BNP Paribas Open – Men's doubles =

Men's doubles
- 2025 BNP Paribas Open

Final
- Champions: (El Salvador) Marcelo Arévalo (Croatia) Mate Pavić
- Runners-up: (United States) Sebastian Korda (Australia) Jordan Thompson
- Score: 6–3, 6–4

Details
- Draw: 32 (3 WC)
- Seeds: 8

Events
Singles	men	women
Doubles	men	women	mixed
← 2024 ·	BNP Paribas Open	· 2026 →

Marcelo Arévalo and Mate Pavić defeated Sebastian Korda and Jordan Thompson in the final, 6–3, 6–4 to win the men's doubles tennis title at the 2025 Indian Wells Open. Arévalo and Pavić retained the world No. 1 doubles ranking after Henry Patten lost in the second round.

Wesley Koolhof and Nikola Mektić were the reigning champions, but Koolhof retired from professional tennis at the end of 2024. Mektić partnered Michael Venus, but lost in the first round to Matteo Berrettini and Lorenzo Sonego.

== Seeds ==
1. (El Salvador) Marcelo Arévalo / (Croatia) Mate Pavić (champions)
2. (Finland) Harri Heliövaara / (United Kingdom) Henry Patten (second round)
3. (Italy) Simone Bolelli / (Italy) Andrea Vavassori (first round)
4. (Spain) Marcel Granollers / (Argentina) Horacio Zeballos (first round)
5. (Croatia) Nikola Mektić / (New Zealand) Michael Venus (first round)
6. (United Kingdom) Julian Cash / (United Kingdom) Lloyd Glasspool (second round)
7. (Argentina) Máximo González / (Argentina) Andrés Molteni (quarterfinals)
8. (United Kingdom) Joe Salisbury / (United Kingdom) Neal Skupski (second round)

== Draw ==
=== Key ===
- Q = Qualifier
- WC = Wild card
- LL = Lucky loser
- Alt = Alternate
- SE = Special exempt
- PR = Protected ranking
- ITF = ITF entry
- JE = Junior exempt
- w/o = Walkover
- r = Retired
- d = Defaulted
- SR = Special ranking

=== Finals ===
Semifinals
1	(El Salvador) Marcelo Arévalo (Croatia) Mate Pavić	6	6
WC	(United States) Christian Harrison (United States) Evan King	3	4
(United States) Sebastian Korda (Australia) Jordan Thompson	3	6	[10]
Alt	(Brazil) Fernando Romboli (Australia) John-Patrick Smith	6	3	[8]

Final
1	(El Salvador) Marcelo Arévalo (Croatia) Mate Pavić	6	6
(United States) Sebastian Korda (Australia) Jordan Thompson	3	4

=== Top half ===
First round
1	(El Salvador) M Arévalo (Croatia) M Pavić	6	6
(Argentina) S Báez (Argentina) TM Etcheverry	3	4
(United Kingdom) J Draper (Czech Republic) T Macháč	6	6
(India) R Bopanna (Croatia) I Dodig	3	4
Alt	(United States) R Seggerman (United States) P Trhac	6	6^{4}	[10]
WC	K Khachanov; A Rublev	2	7^{7}	[7]
(Italy) M Berrettini (Italy) L Sonego	6	6
5	(Croatia) N Mektić (New Zealand) M Venus	4	3
3	(Italy) S Bolelli (Italy) A Vavassori	4	4
(Australia) M Ebden (Australia) J Peers	6	6
WC	(United States) C Harrison (United States) E King	6	6
(France) A Fils (France) U Humbert	3	2
(Monaco) H Nys (France) É Roger-Vasselin	6	6
(France) S Doumbia (France) F Reboul	4	2
(Belgium) J Vliegen (United States) J Withrow	7^{7}	5	[8]
7	(Argentina) M González (Argentina) A Molteni	6^{4}	7	[10]

Second round
1	(El Salvador) M Arévalo (Croatia) M Pavić	6	7
(United Kingdom) J Draper (Czech Republic) T Macháč	1	5
Alt	(United States) R Seggerman (United States) P Trhac	3	2
(Italy) M Berrettini (Italy) L Sonego	6	6
(Australia) M Ebden (Australia) J Peers	3	7^{7}	[9]
WC	(United States) C Harrison (United States) E King	6	6^{5}	[11]
(Monaco) H Nys (France) É Roger-Vasselin	3	6	[6]
7	(Argentina) M González (Argentina) A Molteni	6	1	[10]

Quarterfinals
1	(El Salvador) M Arévalo (Croatia) M Pavić	7^{8}	6
(Italy) M Berrettini (Italy) L Sonego	6^{6}	4
WC	(United States) C Harrison (United States) E King	7^{7}	6
7	(Argentina) M González (Argentina) A Molteni	6^{4}	3

Semifinals
1	(El Salvador) M Arévalo (Croatia) M Pavić	6	6
WC	(United States) C Harrison (United States) E King	3	4

=== Bottom half ===
First round
8	(United Kingdom) J Salisbury (United Kingdom) N Skupski	7^{11}	4	[10]
(Spain) P Martínez (France) G Mpetshi Perricard	6^{9}	6	[7]
(United States) S Korda (Australia) J Thompson	6	7
Alt	(Austria) A Erler (Germany) C Frantzen	4	5
(United Kingdom) J Murray (Czech Republic) A Pavlásek	2	7^{7}	[12]
(Uruguay) A Behar (United States) R Galloway	6	6^{5}	[10]
(Czech Republic) J Lehečka (Chile) A Tabilo	6	6
4	(Spain) M Granollers (Argentina) H Zeballos	2	3
6	(United Kingdom) J Cash (United Kingdom) L Glasspool	6	6
(Italy) L Darderi (Bulgaria) G Dimitrov	3	4
Alt	(Brazil) F Romboli (Australia) J-P Smith	6	3	[10]
(United States) A Krajicek (United States) R Ram	4	6	[8]
Alt	(India) Y Bhambri (Sweden) A Göransson	3	7^{7}	[10]
(Belgium) S Gillé (Poland) J Zieliński	6	6^{5}	[8]
(Brazil) M Melo (Germany) A Zverev	2	3
2	(Finland) H Heliövaara (United Kingdom) H Patten	6	6

Second round
8	(United Kingdom) J Salisbury (United Kingdom) N Skupski	7^{7}	5	[9]
(United States) S Korda (Australia) J Thompson	6^{2}	7	[11]
(United Kingdom) J Murray (Czech Republic) A Pavlásek	6^{1}	4
(Czech Republic) J Lehečka (Chile) A Tabilo	7^{7}	6
6	(United Kingdom) J Cash (United Kingdom) L Glasspool	4	6	[5]
Alt	(Brazil) F Romboli (Australia) J-P Smith	6	4	[10]
Alt	(India) Y Bhambri (Sweden) A Göransson	6	5	[10]
2	(Finland) H Heliövaara (United Kingdom) H Patten	2	7	[5]

Quarterfinals
(United States) S Korda (Australia) J Thompson	6	6
(Czech Republic) J Lehečka (Chile) A Tabilo	4	4
Alt	(Brazil) F Romboli (Australia) J-P Smith	7^{7}	3	[10]
Alt	(India) Y Bhambri (Sweden) A Göransson	6^{5}	6	[8]

Semifinals
(United States) S Korda (Australia) J Thompson	3	6	[10]
Alt	(Brazil) F Romboli (Australia) J-P Smith	6	3	[8]

== Seeded teams ==
The following are the seeded teams. Seedings are based on ATP rankings as of 3 March 2025.

Country	Player	Country	Player	Rank	Seed
ESA	Marcelo Arévalo	CRO	Mate Pavić	2	1
FIN	Harri Heliövaara	GBR	Henry Patten	7	2
ITA	Simone Bolelli	ITA	Andrea Vavassori	15	3
ESP	Marcel Granollers	ARG	Horacio Zeballos	19	4
CRO	Nikola Mektić	NZL	Michael Venus	26	5
GBR	Julian Cash	GBR	Lloyd Glasspool	32	6
ARG	Máximo González	ARG	Andrés Molteni	48	7
GBR	Joe Salisbury	GBR	Neal Skupski	48	8

== Other entry information ==
=== Wildcards ===
- ~~(United States) Marcos Giron / (United States) Learner Tien~~
- (United States) Christian Harrison / (United States) Evan King
- Karen Khachanov / Andrey Rublev

=== Alternates ===
- (India) Yuki Bhambri / (Sweden) André Göransson
- (Austria) Alexander Erler / (Germany) Constantin Frantzen
- (Brazil) Fernando Romboli / (Australia) John-Patrick Smith
- (United States) Ryan Seggerman / (United States) Patrik Trhac

=== Withdrawals ===
- (Argentina) Francisco Cerúndolo / (United States) Frances Tiafoe → replaced by (Brazil) Fernando Romboli / (Australia) John-Patrick Smith
- (Italy) Flavio Cobolli / (Italy) Lorenzo Musetti → replaced by (India) Yuki Bhambri / (Sweden) André Göransson
- (Bulgaria) Grigor Dimitrov / (Netherlands) Jean-Julien Rojer → replaced by (Italy) Luciano Darderi / (Bulgaria) Grigor Dimitrov
- (United States) Taylor Fritz / (United States) Tommy Paul → replaced by (Spain) Pedro Martínez / (France) Giovanni Mpetshi Perricard
- (United States) Marcos Giron / (United States) Learner Tien → replaced by (United States) Ryan Seggerman / (United States) Patrik Trhac
- (Germany) Kevin Krawietz / (Germany) Tim Pütz → replaced by (Argentina) Sebastián Báez / (Argentina) Tomás Martín Etcheverry
- (United States) Alex Michelsen / (United States) Ben Shelton → replaced by (Austria) Alexander Erler / (Germany) Constantin Frantzen
