= 2025 BNP Paribas Open – Women's singles =

Tennis tournament event

Women's singles
- 2025 BNP Paribas Open

Final
- Champion: Mirra Andreeva
- Runner-up: Aryna Sabalenka
- Score: 2–6, 6–4, 6–3

Details
- Draw: 96 (12 Q / 8 WC )
- Seeds: 32

Events
Singles	men	women
Doubles	men	women	mixed
- Indian Wells Open

Mirra Andreeva defeated Aryna Sabalenka in the final, 2–6, 6–4, 6–3 to win the women's singles tennis title at the 2025 Indian Wells Open. It was her second WTA 1000 and third career WTA Tour title. Aged 17 years and 10 months old, Andreeva was the youngest Indian Wells champion since Serena Williams in 1999, as well as the second-youngest player to defeat both the world No. 1 and No. 2 in a single tournament since the WTA rankings were established in 1975 (after Tracy Austin at the 1979 US Open).

Iga Świątek was the defending champion, but lost in the semifinals to Andreeva. Świątek became the first woman to reach four consecutive semifinals at the tournament since its inception in 1989.

== Seeds ==
All seeds received a bye into the second round.

1. Aryna Sabalenka (final)
2. (Poland) Iga Świątek (semifinals)
3. (United States) Coco Gauff (fourth round)
4. (United States) Jessica Pegula (fourth round)
5. (United States) Madison Keys (semifinals)
6. (Italy) Jasmine Paolini (fourth round)
7. (Kazakhstan) Elena Rybakina (fourth round)
8. (China) Zheng Qinwen (quarterfinals)
9. Mirra Andreeva (champion)
10. (United States) Emma Navarro (third round)
11. (Spain) Paula Badosa (withdrew)
12. Daria Kasatkina (third round)
13. Diana Shnaider (third round)
14. (United States) Danielle Collins (third round)
15. (Czech Republic) Karolína Muchová (fourth round)
16. (Brazil) Beatriz Haddad Maia (second round)

17. (United States) Amanda Anisimova (second round)
18. (Ukraine) Marta Kostyuk (fourth round)
19. (Croatia) Donna Vekić (fourth round)
20. Ekaterina Alexandrova (second round)
21. (Kazakhstan) Yulia Putintseva (second round)
22. (Denmark) Clara Tauson (third round)
23. (Ukraine) Elina Svitolina (quarterfinals)
24. Liudmila Samsonova (quarterfinals)
25. (United Kingdom) Katie Boulter (third round)
26. (Latvia) Jeļena Ostapenko (second round)
27. (Canada) Leylah Fernandez (second round)
28. (Belgium) Elise Mertens (third round)
29. (Greece) Maria Sakkari (third round)
30. (Poland) Magdalena Fręch (second round)
31. (Czech Republic) Linda Nosková (second round)
32. (Tunisia) Ons Jabeur (second round)

Click on the seed number of a player to go to their draw section.

== Draw ==
Key

- Q = Qualifier
- WC = Wild card
- LL = Lucky loser
- Alt = Alternate
- ITF = ITF entry
- PR = Protected ranking
- SR = Special ranking
- SE = Special exempt
- JE = Junior exempt
- JR = Junior Accelerator Programme entrant
- CO = College Accelerator Programme entrant
- NG = Next Gen Accelerator Program entrant
- w/o = Walkover
- r = Retired
- d = Defaulted

=== Finals ===
Quarterfinals
1	Aryna Sabalenka	6	6
24	Liudmila Samsonova	2	3
WC	(Switzerland) Belinda Bencic	1	1
5	(United States) Madison Keys	6	6
9	Mirra Andreeva	7	6
23	(Ukraine) Elina Svitolina	5	3
8	(China) Zheng Qinwen	3	3
2	(Poland) Iga Świątek	6	6

Semifinals
1	Aryna Sabalenka	6	6
5	(United States) Madison Keys	0	1
9	Mirra Andreeva	7^{7}	1	6
2	(Poland) Iga Świątek	6^{1}	6	3

Final
1	Aryna Sabalenka	6	4	3
9	Mirra Andreeva	2	6	6

=== Top half ===
==== Section 1 ====
First round
A Blinkova	1	2
(United States) M Kessler	6	6
(Ukraine) A Kalinina	4	5
(Italy) L Bronzetti	6	7
Q	(United States) C Liu	4	2
P Kudermetova	6	6
LL	(United Kingdom) S Kartal	7^{8}	6
Q	(United States) V Lepchenko	6^{6}	2

Second round
1	A Sabalenka	7^{7}	6
(United States) M Kessler	6^{4}	3
(Italy) L Bronzetti	6	7
30	(Poland) M Fręch	3	5
20	E Alexandrova	5	2
P Kudermetova	7	6
LL	(United Kingdom) S Kartal	6	6
16	(Brazil) B Haddad Maia	2	1

Third round
1	A Sabalenka	6	6
(Italy) L Bronzetti	1	2
P Kudermetova	5	3
LL	(United Kingdom) S Kartal	7	6

Fourth round
1	A Sabalenka	6	6
LL	(United Kingdom) S Kartal	1	2

==== Section 2 ====
First round
Q	(Australia) M Inglis	2	1
(United States) S Kenin	6	6
Q	(Australia) A Tomljanović	4	0^{r}
PR	(United States) C McNally	6	0
V Kudermetova	2	3
(Romania) J Cristian	6	6
WC	(United States) I Jovic	2	7	6
PR	(Austria) J Grabher	6	5	0

Second round
12	D Kasatkina	3	7	6
(United States) S Kenin	6	5	4
PR	(United States) C McNally	6^{8}	4
24	L Samsonova	7^{10}	6
27	(Canada) L Fernandez	7	6^{5}	3
(Romania) J Cristian	5	7^{7}	6
WC	(United States) I Jovic	6^{3}	6	3
6	(Italy) J Paolini	7^{7}	1	6

Third round
12	D Kasatkina	6	3	2
24	L Samsonova	2	6	6
(Romania) J Cristian	4	6	4
6	(Italy) J Paolini	6	3	6

Fourth round
24	L Samsonova	6	6
6	(Italy) J Paolini	0	4

==== Section 3 ====
First round
(United Kingdom) E Raducanu	3	2
(Japan) M Uchijima	6	6
(Serbia) O Danilović	2	3
(Bulgaria) V Tomova	6	6
WC	(Switzerland) B Bencic	6	6
(Germany) T Maria	1	1
WC	(United States) A Parks	6	6
A Kalinskaya	4	3

Second round
3	(United States) C Gauff	6	3	7^{7}
(Japan) M Uchijima	4	6	6^{4}
(Bulgaria) V Tomova	0	3
29	(Greece) M Sakkari	6	6
17	(United States) A Anisimova	4	7^{7}	1
WC	(Switzerland) B Bencic	6	6^{3}	6
WC	(United States) A Parks	1	1
13	D Shnaider	6	6

Third round
3	(United States) C Gauff	7^{7}	6
29	(Greece) M Sakkari	6^{1}	2
WC	(Switzerland) B Bencic	6	6
13	D Shnaider	4	4

Fourth round
3	(United States) C Gauff	6	3	4
WC	(Switzerland) B Bencic	3	6	6

==== Section 4 ====
First round
(Romania) S Cîrstea	6	7
Q	(Australia) M Joint	2	5
PR	(United States) L Davis	4	2
(Armenia) E Avanesyan	6	6
Q	(Switzerland) V Golubic	4	4
Q	(Australia) K Birrell	6	6
(Spain) J Bouzas Maneiro	7^{7}	4	5
A Potapova	6^{5}	6	7

Second round
10	(United States) E Navarro	3	6	7^{7}
(Romania) S Cîrstea	6	1	6^{3}
(Armenia) E Avanesyan	3	3
19	(Croatia) D Vekić	6	6
28	(Belgium) E Mertens	6	7
Q	(Australia) K Birrell	4	5
A Potapova	3	0
5	(United States) M Keys	6	6

Third round
10	(United States) E Navarro	6^{5}	1
19	(Croatia) D Vekić	7^{7}	6
28	(Belgium) E Mertens	2	7^{10}	4
5	(United States) M Keys	6	6^{8}	6

Fourth round
19	(Croatia) D Vekić	6	6^{7}	3
5	(United States) M Keys	4	7^{9}	6

=== Bottom half ===
==== Section 5 ====
First round
(Czech Republic) M Bouzková	6	3	3
(Netherlands) S Lamens	3	6	6
PR	(Romania) I-C Begu	7	3	6
(United States) A Li	5	6	1
(Colombia) C Osorio	6	6
(Japan) N Osaka	4	4
WC	(Czech Republic) P Kvitová	6	3	4
(France) V Gracheva	4	6	6

Second round
7	(Kazakhstan) E Rybakina	6	6
(Netherlands) S Lamens	3	3
PR	(Romania) I-C Begu	7^{7}	3	0
25	(United Kingdom) K Boulter	6^{2}	6	6
22	(Denmark) C Tauson	7^{7}	7
(Colombia) C Osorio	6^{3}	5
(France) V Gracheva	5	4
9	M Andreeva	7	6

Third round
7	(Kazakhstan) E Rybakina	6	7
25	(United Kingdom) K Boulter	0	5
22	(Denmark) C Tauson	3	0
9	M Andreeva	6	6

Fourth round
7	(Kazakhstan) E Rybakina	1	2
9	M Andreeva	6	6

==== Section 6 ====
First round
Q	(United States) H Baptiste	6	6
Q	(United States) W Osuigwe	1	2
(United States) A Krueger	0	6	6
(United States) K Volynets	6	2	2
(Egypt) M Sherif	4	5
(China) Xin Wang	6	7
(United States) P Stearns	4	6	3
(Poland) M Linette	6	4	6

Second round
14	(United States) D Collins	5	6	6
Q	(United States) H Baptiste	7	2	4
(United States) A Krueger	1	7^{10}	3
23	(Ukraine) E Svitolina	6	6^{8}	6
26	(Latvia) J Ostapenko	4	4
(China) Xin Wang	6	6
(Poland) M Linette	4	2
4	(United States) J Pegula	6	6

Third round
14	(United States) D Collins	2	4
23	(Ukraine) E Svitolina	6	6
(China) Xin Wang	2	1
4	(United States) J Pegula	6	6

Fourth round
23	(Ukraine) E Svitolina	5	6	6
4	(United States) J Pegula	7	1	2

==== Section 7 ====
First round
Q	(United States) C Ngounoue	4	6^{7}
V Azarenka	6	7^{9}
(Slovakia) R Šramková	3	6	6^{2}
(New Zealand) L Sun	6	1	7^{7}
Q	(Germany) J Niemeier	6	5	2
WC	(United States) R Montgomery	3	7	6
K Rakhimova	2	6^{3}
WC	(United States) C Dolehide	6	7^{7}

Second round
8	(China) Q Zheng	6	6
V Azarenka	3	4
(New Zealand) L Sun	6	6
31	(Czech Republic) L Nosková	1	4
18	(Ukraine) M Kostyuk	6	6
WC	(United States) R Montgomery	1	3
WC	(United States) C Dolehide	7^{7}	6
LL	(Germany) E Lys	6^{3}	4

Third round
8	(China) Q Zheng	6	7
(New Zealand) L Sun	4	5
18	(Ukraine) M Kostyuk	6	6
WC	(United States) C Dolehide	3	3

Fourth round
8	(China) Q Zheng	6	6
18	(Ukraine) M Kostyuk	3	2

==== Section 8 ====
First round
(Mexico) R Zarazúa	4	0^{r}
(Italy) E Cocciaretto	6	1
Q	(Argentina) ML Carlé	2	1
(Czech Republic) K Siniaková	6	6
(Ukraine) D Yastremska	6	6
(China) Y Yuan	2	4
(France) C Garcia	6	6
WC	(United States) B Pera	3	4

Second round
15	(Czech Republic) K Muchová	6	6
(Italy) E Cocciaretto	4	3
(Czech Republic) K Siniaková	6	6
21	(Kazakhstan) Y Putintseva	2	2
32	(Tunisia) O Jabeur	3	1
(Ukraine) D Yastremska	6	6
(France) C Garcia	2	0
2	(Poland) I Świątek	6	6

Third round
15	(Czech Republic) K Muchová	7	6
(Czech Republic) K Siniaková	5	1
(Ukraine) D Yastremska	0	2
2	(Poland) I Świątek	6	6

Fourth round
15	(Czech Republic) K Muchová	1	1
2	(Poland) I Świątek	6	6

== Seeded players ==
^{‡}	Champion
^{†}	Runner-up

The following are the seeded players. Seedings are based on WTA rankings as of 24 February 2025. Rankings and points before are as of 3 March 2025.

Under the 2025 Rulebook, points from six of the seven combined WTA 1000 tournaments (which include Indian Wells) are required to be counted in a player's ranking.

Seed	Rank	Player	Points before	Points defending	Points earned	Points after	Status
1	1	Aryna Sabalenka †	9,076	120	650	9,606	Runner-up, lost to Mirra Andreeva [9]
2	2	(Poland) Iga Świątek	7,985	1,000	390	7,375	Semifinals lost to Mirra Andreeva [9]
3	3	(United States) Coco Gauff	6,333	390	120	6,063	Fourth round lost to (Switzerland) Belinda Bencic [WC]
4	4	(United States) Jessica Pegula	5,251	10	120	5,361	Fourth round lost to (Ukraine) Elina Svitolina [23]
5	5	(United States) Madison Keys	4,679	65	390	5,004	Semifinals lost to Aryna Sabalenka [1]
6	6	(Italy) Jasmine Paolini	4,518	120	120	4,518	Fourth round lost to Liudmila Samsonova [24]
7	7	(Kazakhstan) Elena Rybakina	4,328	0	120	4,448	Fourth round lost to Mirra Andreeva [9]
8	9	(China) Zheng Qinwen	3,780	10	215	3,985	Quarterfinals lost to (Poland) Iga Świątek [2]
9	11	Mirra Andreeva ‡	3,720	10	1,000	4,710	Champion, defeated Aryna Sabalenka [1]
10	8	(United States) Emma Navarro	4,009	215	65	3,859	Third round lost to (Croatia) Donna Vekić [19]
11	10	(Spain) Paula Badosa	3,746	(10)^{†}	0	3,736	Withdrew due to back injury
12	12	Daria Kasatkina	3,116	120	65	3,061	Third round lost to Liudmila Samsonova [24]
13	13	Diana Shnaider	2,908	35	65	2,938	Third round lost to (Switzerland) Belinda Bencic [WC]
14	14	(United States) Danielle Collins	2,823	35	65	2,853	Third round lost to (Ukraine) Elina Svitolina [23]
15	15	(Czech Republic) Karolína Muchová	2,734	0	120	2,854	Fourth round lost to (Poland) Iga Świątek [2]
16	17	(Brazil) Beatriz Haddad Maia	2,369	65	10	2,314	Second round lost to (United Kingdom) Sonay Kartal [LL]
17	18	(United States) Amanda Anisimova	2,326	(1)^{‡}	10	2,335	Second round lost to (Switzerland) Belinda Bencic [WC]
18	24	(Ukraine) Marta Kostyuk	1,955	390	120	1,685	Fourth round lost to (China) Zheng Qinwen [8]
19	22	(Croatia) Donna Vekić	2,056	10	120	2,166	Fourth round lost to (United States) Madison Keys [5]
20	19	Ekaterina Alexandrova	2,158	10	10	2,158	Second round lost to Polina Kudermetova
21	20	(Kazakhstan) Yulia Putintseva	2,138	120	10	2,028	Second round lost to (Czech Republic) Kateřina Siniaková
22	21	(Denmark) Clara Tauson	2,069	20	65	2,114	Third round lost to Mirra Andreeva [9]
23	23	(Ukraine) Elina Svitolina	1,980	65	215	2,130	Quarterfinals lost to Mirra Andreeva [9]
24	25	Liudmila Samsonova	1,945	10	215	2,150	Quarterfinals lost to Aryna Sabalenka [1]
25	38	(United Kingdom) Katie Boulter	1,421	10	65	1,476	Third round lost to (Kazakhstan) Elena Rybakina [7]
26	26	(Latvia) Jeļena Ostapenko	1,842	10	10	1,842	Second round lost to (China) Wang Xinyu
27	27	(Canada) Leylah Fernandez	1,763	10	10	1,763	Second round lost to (Romania) Jaqueline Cristian
28	28	(Belgium) Elise Mertens	1,756	120	65	1,701	Third round lost to (United States) Madison Keys [5]
29	29	(Greece) Maria Sakkari	1,719	650	65	1,134	Third round lost to (United States) Coco Gauff [3]
30	30	(Poland) Magdalena Fręch	1,712	10	10	1,712	Second round lost to (Italy) Lucia Bronzetti
31	31	(Czech Republic) Linda Nosková	1,683	65	10	1,628	Second round lost to (New Zealand) Lulu Sun
32	32	(Tunisia) Ons Jabeur	1,669	10	10	1,669	Second round lost to (Ukraine) Dayana Yastremska

† The player did not qualify for the 2024 tournament. Points from her 6th best combined WTA 1000 result will be deducted instead.
‡ The player did not qualify for the 2024 tournament. Points from her 18th best result will be deducted instead.

=== Withdrawn seeded players ===
The following players would have been seeded, but withdrew before the tournament began.

Rank	Player	Points before	Points dropping	Points after	Withdrawal reason
16	(Czech Republic) Barbora Krejčíková	2,675	0	2,675	Back injury

== Other entry information ==
=== Wildcards ===
- (Switzerland) Belinda Bencic
- (United States) Caroline Dolehide
- (United States) Iva Jovic
- (Czech Republic) Petra Kvitová
- (United States) Robin Montgomery
- (United States) Alycia Parks
- (United States) Bernarda Pera
- ~~(United States) Sloane Stephens~~

=== Protected ranking ===
- (Romania) Irina-Camelia Begu
- (United States) Lauren Davis
- (Austria) Julia Grabher
- (United States) Caty McNally

=== Withdrawals ===
- † (Spain) Paula Badosa → replaced by (Germany) Eva Lys
- ‡ (Czech Republic) Barbora Krejčíková → replaced by (Austria) Julia Grabher
- ‡ Anastasia Pavlyuchenkova → replaced by (Germany) Tatjana Maria
- ‡ (Czech Republic) Karolína Plíšková → replaced by (United States) Sofia Kenin
- † (United States) Sloane Stephens → replaced by (United Kingdom) Sonay Kartal
- ‡ (Czech Republic) Markéta Vondroušová → replaced by (France) Caroline Garcia

‡ – withdrew from entry list
† – withdrew from main draw

== Qualifying ==
=== Seeds ===
1. (Australia) Kimberly Birrell (qualified)
2. (Germany) Eva Lys (qualifying competition, lucky loser)
3. (United Kingdom) Sonay Kartal (qualifying competition, lucky loser)
4. (United States) Taylor Townsend (qualifying competition)
5. (Germany) Laura Siegemund (first round)
6. (Turkey) Zeynep Sönmez (qualifying competition, withdrew)
7. (Spain) Sara Sorribes Tormo (qualifying competition)
8. (Belgium) Greet Minnen (qualifying competition)
9. (Australia) Olivia Gadecki (first round)
10. (Hungary) Anna Bondár (first round)
11. (Switzerland) Jil Teichmann (first round)
12. (United States) Hailey Baptiste (qualified)
13. (Spain) Cristina Bucșa (qualifying competition)
14. (Argentina) María Lourdes Carlé (qualified)
15. (Romania) Anca Todoni (first round)
16. (Australia) Maya Joint (qualified)
17. (Switzerland) Viktorija Golubic (qualified)
18. (Germany) Jule Niemeier (qualified)
19. (Spain) Nuria Párrizas Díaz (first round)
20. (Canada) Rebecca Marino (first round)
21. (Ukraine) Yuliia Starodubtseva (first round)
22. (Japan) Aoi Ito (qualifying competition)
23. (Australia) Ajla Tomljanović (qualified)
24. (Thailand) Mananchaya Sawangkaew (first round)

=== Qualifiers ===
1. (Australia) Kimberly Birrell
2. (Germany) Jule Niemeier
3. (United States) Clervie Ngounoue
4. (United States) Varvara Lepchenko
5. (United States) Whitney Osuigwe
6. (Australia) Ajla Tomljanović
7. (United States) Claire Liu
8. (Switzerland) Viktorija Golubic
9. (Australia) Maya Joint
10. (Australia) Maddison Inglis
11. (Argentina) María Lourdes Carlé
12. (United States) Hailey Baptiste

=== Lucky losers ===
1. (United Kingdom) Sonay Kartal
2. (Germany) Eva Lys

=== Qualifying draw ===
==== First qualifier ====
First round
1	(Australia) Kimberly Birrell	6	6
WC	(United States) Kristina Penickova	3	0
(Italy) Sara Errani	3	4
13	(Spain) Cristina Bucșa	6	6

Qualifying competition
1	(Australia) Kimberly Birrell	6	6
13	(Spain) Cristina Bucșa	4	4

==== Second qualifier ====
First round
2	(Germany) Eva Lys	6	6
Aliaksandra Sasnovich	4	3
WC	(Belgium) Hanne Vandewinkel	3	3
18	(Germany) Jule Niemeier	6	6

Qualifying competition
2	(Germany) Eva Lys	4	3
18	(Germany) Jule Niemeier	6	6

==== Third qualifier ====
First round
3	(United Kingdom) Sonay Kartal	6	6
(Canada) Marina Stakusic	2	2
WC	(United States) Clervie Ngounoue	6	7^{7}
20	(Canada) Rebecca Marino	4	6^{3}

Qualifying competition
3	(United Kingdom) Sonay Kartal	6	5	5
WC	(United States) Clervie Ngounoue	3	7	7

==== Fourth qualifier ====
First round
4	(United States) Taylor Townsend	6	6
PR	(Belgium) Yanina Wickmayer	2	1
(United States) Varvara Lepchenko	7^{7}	6
15	(Romania) Anca Todoni	6^{3}	3

Qualifying competition
4	(United States) Taylor Townsend	2	4
(United States) Varvara Lepchenko	6	6

==== Fifth qualifier ====
First round
5	(Germany) Laura Siegemund	5	7^{7}	4
PR	(Slovenia) Kaja Juvan	7	6^{2}	6
WC	(United States) Whitney Osuigwe	5	6	6
19	(Spain) Nuria Párrizas Díaz	7	2	1

Qualifying competition
PR	(Slovenia) Kaja Juvan	0	6^{9}
WC	(United States) Whitney Osuigwe	6	7^{11}

==== Sixth qualifier ====
First round
6	(Turkey) Zeynep Sönmez	6	6
(China) Wei Sijia	2	2
WC	(United States) Julieta Pareja	4	4
23	(Australia) Ajla Tomljanović	6	6

Qualifying competition
6	(Turkey) Zeynep Sönmez
23	(Australia) Ajla Tomljanović	w/o

==== Seventh qualifier ====
First round
7	(Spain) Sara Sorribes Tormo	7	6
(Japan) Nao Hibino	5	1
PR	(United States) Claire Liu	7	7^{7}
21	(Ukraine) Yuliia Starodubtseva	5	6^{2}

Qualifying competition
7	(Spain) Sara Sorribes Tormo	4	3
PR	(United States) Claire Liu	6	6

==== Eighth qualifier ====
First round
8	(Belgium) Greet Minnen	6	6
WC	(United States) Valerie Glozman	1	2
PR	(United Kingdom) Jodie Burrage	3	1
17	(Switzerland) Viktorija Golubic	6	6

Qualifying competition
8	(Belgium) Greet Minnen	4	4
17	(Switzerland) Viktorija Golubic	6	6

==== Ninth qualifier ====
First round
9	(Australia) Olivia Gadecki	4	7	0
PR	(Sweden) Mirjam Björklund	6	5	6
Anastasia Zakharova	1	6	1
16	(Australia) Maya Joint	6	4	6

Qualifying competition
PR	(Sweden) Mirjam Björklund	2	6	3
16	(Australia) Maya Joint	6	4	6

==== Tenth qualifier ====
First round
10	(Hungary) Anna Bondár	5	4
(Australia) Maddison Inglis	7	6
(Ukraine) Daria Snigur	6	1	4
22	(Japan) Aoi Ito	4	6	6

Qualifying competition
(Australia) Maddison Inglis	7^{7}	7
22	(Japan) Aoi Ito	6^{4}	5

==== Eleventh qualifier ====
First round
11	(Switzerland) Jil Teichmann	6	4	3
(Australia) Daria Saville	4	6	6
(Croatia) Petra Martić	2	3
14	(Argentina) María Lourdes Carlé	6	6

Qualifying competition
(Australia) Daria Saville	2	1
14	(Argentina) María Lourdes Carlé	6	6

==== Twelfth qualifier ====
First round
12	(United States) Hailey Baptiste	6	2	6
(Japan) Ena Shibahara	0	6	3
(France) Léolia Jeanjean	6	6
24	(Thailand) Mananchaya Sawangkaew	2	4

Qualifying competition
12	(United States) Hailey Baptiste	7^{7}	6
(France) Léolia Jeanjean	6^{5}	4
