= Davis Cup winning players =

This is a complete list of all players who won the Davis Cup, an international team event in men's tennis:

Country	Player	Total	Years
(Australia)	Roy Emerson	8	1959, 1960, 1961, 1962, 1964, 1965, 1966, 1967
(United States)	Stan Smith	8	1968, 1969, 1970, 1971, 1972, 1978, 1979, 1981
(United States)	Bill Tilden	7	1920, 1921, 1922, 1923, 1924, 1925, 1926
(United States)	Bill Johnston	7	1920, 1921, 1922, 1923, 1924, 1925, 1926
(United States)	Norris Williams	7	1913, 1920, 1921, 1922, 1923, 1925, 1926
(Australia)	Neale Fraser	7	1955, 1956, 1957, 1959, 1960, 1961, 1962
(France)	Henri Cochet	6	1927, 1928, 1929, 1930, 1931, 1932
(France)	Jean Borotra	6	1927, 1928, 1929, 1930, 1931, 1932
(Australia)	John Newcombe	6	1964, 1965, 1966, 1967, 1973, 1977
(United States)	Bob Lutz	6	1968, 1969, 1970, 1978, 1979, 1981
(Australasia) / (Australia)	Norman Brookes	5	1907, 1908, 1909, 1914, 1919
(France)	Jacques Brugnon	5	1927, 1928, 1930, 1931, 1932
(United States)	Frank Parker	5	1937, 1939, 1946, 1947, 1948
(Australia)	Rod Laver	5	1959, 1960, 1961, 1962, 1973
(Australia)	Tony Roche	5	1964, 1965, 1966, 1967, 1977
(United States)	John McEnroe	5	1978, 1979, 1981, 1982, 1992
(Spain)	Feliciano López	5	2004, 2008, 2009, 2011, 2019
(Spain)	Rafael Nadal	5	2004, 2008, 2009, 2011, 2019
(United Kingdom)	Reggie Doherty	4	1903, 1904, 1905, 1906
(United Kingdom)	Laurence Doherty	4	1903, 1904, 1905, 1906
(Australasia) / (New Zealand)	Tony Wilding	4	1907, 1908, 1909, 1914
(United States)	Vincent Richards	4	1922, 1924, 1925, 1926
(France)	Christian Boussus	4	1928, 1929, 1930, 1931
(United Kingdom)	Bunny Austin	4	1933, 1934, 1935, 1936
(United Kingdom)	Fred Perry	4	1933, 1934, 1935, 1936
(United Kingdom)	Patrick Hughes	4	1933, 1934, 1935, 1936
(United States)	Ted Schroeder	4	1946, 1947, 1948, 1949
(United States)	Gardnar Mulloy	4	1946, 1947, 1948, 1949
(Australia)	Mervyn Rose	4	1951, 1952, 1953, 1957
(United States)	Lew Hoad	4	1952, 1953, 1955, 1956
(Australia)	Ken Rosewall	4	1953, 1955, 1956, 1973
(Australia)	Fred Stolle	4	1961, 1964, 1965, 1966
(United States)	Arthur Ashe	4	1968, 1969, 1970, 1978
(United States)	Bill Talbert	3	1948, 1949, 1954
(Australia)	Frank Sedgman	3	1950, 1951, 1952
(Australia)	Ken McGregor	3	1950, 1951, 1952
(United States)	Sherwood Stewart	3	1978, 1981, 1982
(United States)	Peter Fleming	3	1979, 1981, 1982
(Sweden)	Mats Wilander	3	1984, 1985, 1987
(Sweden)	Stefan Edberg	3	1984, 1985, 1987
(Sweden)	Anders Järryd	3	1984, 1985, 1987
(Sweden)	Joakim Nyström	3	1984, 1985, 1987
(Germany)	Carl-Uwe Steeb	3	1988, 1989, 1993
(Germany)	Patrik Kühnen	3	1988, 1989, 1993
(United States)	Andre Agassi	3	1990, 1992, 1995
(Sweden)	Magnus Larsson	3	1994, 1997, 1998
(Sweden)	Jonas Björkman	3	1994, 1997, 1998
(Spain)	Juan Carlos Ferrero	3	2000, 2004, 2009
(Spain)	Tommy Robredo	3	2004, 2008, 2009
(Spain)	David Ferrer	3	2008, 2009, 2011
(Spain)	Fernando Verdasco	3	2008, 2009, 2011
(Spain)	Marcel Granollers	3	2008, 2011, 2019
(Italy)	Simone Bolelli	3	2023, 2024, 2025
(United States)	Dwight F. Davis	2	1900, 1902
(United States)	Malcolm Whitman	2	1900, 1902
(United States)	Holcombe Ward	2	1900, 1902
(United Kingdom)	Sydney Howard Smith	2	1905, 1906
(Australia)	Alfred Dunlop	2	1911, 1914
(United States)	Watson Washburn	2	1920, 1921
(France)	René Lacoste	2	1927, 1928
(United Kingdom)	Harry Lee	2	1933, 1934
(United Kingdom)	Raymond Tuckey	2	1935, 1936
(United States)	Don Budge	2	1937, 1938
(United States)	Gene Mako	2	1937, 1938
(Australia)	John Bromwich	2	1939, 1950
(United States)	Jack Kramer	2	1946, 1947
(Australia)	Rex Hartwig	2	1953, 1955
(Australia)	Mal Anderson	2	1957, 1973
(Australia)	Ashley Cooper	2	1956, 1957
(United States)	Ham Richardson	2	1954, 1958
(Australia)	Bob Mark	2	1959, 1960
(United States)	Marty Riessen	2	1963, 1981
(United States)	Frank Froehling	2	1963, 1971
(United States)	Clark Graebner	2	1968, 1971
(United States)	Cliff Richey	2	1969, 1970
(United States)	Erik van Dillen	2	1971, 1972
(United States)	Harold Solomon	2	1972, 1978
(Australia)	Mark Edmondson	2	1977, 1983
(United States)	Vitas Gerulaitis	2	1978, 1979
(United States)	Brian Gottfried	2	1978, 1979
(United States)	Eliot Teltscher	2	1981, 1982
(Australia)	Pat Cash	2	1983, 1986
(Australia)	John Fitzgerald	2	1983, 1986
(Australia)	Paul McNamee	2	1983, 1986
(Sweden)	Henrik Sundström	2	1984, 1985
(Sweden)	Jan Gunnarsson	2	1985, 1987
(Germany)	Boris Becker	2	1988, 1989
(Germany)	Eric Jelen	2	1988, 1989
(United States)	Rick Leach	2	1990, 1992
(France)	Guy Forget	2	1991, 1996
(France)	Fabrice Santoro	2	1991, 1996
(France)	Arnaud Boetsch	2	1991, 1996
(United States)	Jim Courier	2	1992, 1995
(United States)	Pete Sampras	2	1992, 1995
(Sweden)	Magnus Gustafsson	2	1994, 1998
(France)	Cédric Pioline	2	1996, 2001
(Sweden)	Nicklas Kulti	2	1997, 1998
(Sweden)	Thomas Enqvist	2	1997, 1998
(Sweden)	Mikael Tillström	2	1997, 1998
(Australia)	Mark Philippoussis	2	1999, 2003
(Australia)	Lleyton Hewitt	2	1999, 2003
(Australia)	Todd Woodbridge	2	1999, 2003
(Australia)	Wayne Arthurs	2	1999, 2003
(Russia)	Marat Safin	2	2002, 2006
(Russia)	Mikhail Youzhny	2	2002, 2006
(Czech Republic)	Radek Štěpánek	2	2012, 2013
(Czech Republic)	Tomáš Berdych	2	2012, 2013
(Czech Republic)	Lukáš Rosol	2	2012, 2013
(Italy)	Jannik Sinner	2	2023, 2024
(Italy)	Lorenzo Musetti	2	2023, 2024
(Italy)	Lorenzo Sonego	2	2023, 2025
(Italy)	Matteo Berrettini	2	2024, 2025
(Italy)	Andrea Vavassori	2	2024, 2025
(United States)	William Larned	1	1902
(United States)	Frank Riseley	1	1904
(Australasia) / (Australia)	Rodney Heath	1	1911
(Australasia) / (Australia)	Stanley Doust	1	1914
(United Kingdom) / (Ireland)	James Cecil Parke	1	1912
(United Kingdom)	Arthur Gore	1	1912
(United Kingdom)	Herbert Roper Barrett	1	1912
(United Kingdom)	Charles P. Dixon	1	1912
(United Kingdom)	Alfred Beamish	1	1912
(United States)	Maurice McLoughlin	1	1913
(United States)	Harold Hackett	1	1913
(United States)	Wallace Johnson	1	1913
(Australia)	James Anderson	1	1919
(Australia)	Gerald Patterson	1	1919
(United States)	Howard Kinsey	1	1924
(United States)	Bryan Grant	1	1937
(United States)	Bobby Riggs	1	1937
(United States)	Joseph Hunt	1	1938
(Australia)	Adrian Quist	1	1939
(Australia)	Jack Crawford	1	1939
(Australia)	Harry Hopman	1	1939
(United States)	Pancho Gonzales	1	1949
(Australia)	George Worthington	1	1949
(Australia)	Ian Ayre	1	1949
(United States)	Tony Trabert	1	1954
(United States)	Vic Seixas	1	1954
(United States)	Straight Clark	1	1954
(United States)	Harold Burrows	1	1954
(United States)	Alex Olmedo	1	1958
(United States)	Barry MacKay	1	1958
(United States)	Butch Buchholz	1	1958
(United States)	William Quillian	1	1958
(United States)	Jon Douglas	1	1958
(United States)	Sam Giammalva	1	1958
(United States)	Whitney Reed	1	1958
(United States)	Whitney Reed	1	1958
(Australia)	Ken Fletcher	1	1962
(United States)	Dennis Ralston	1	1963
(United States)	Chuck McKinley	1	1963
(Australia)	Bill Bowrey	1	1963
(United States)	Charlie Pasarell	1	1968
(United States)	Tom Gorman	1	1972
(Australia)	Geoff Masters	1	1973
(Australia)	John Cooper	1	1973
(South Africa)	Ray Moore	1	1974
(South Africa)	Bob Hewitt	1	1974
(South Africa)	Frew McMillan	1	1974
(South Africa)	Byron Bertram	1	1974
(South Africa)	Cliff Drysdale	1	1974
(Sweden)	Ove Bengtson	1	1975
(Sweden)	Björn Borg	1	1975
(Sweden)	Rolf Norberg	1	1975
(Sweden)	Birger Andersson	1	1975
(Italy)	Adriano Panatta	1	1976
(Italy)	Tonino Zugarelli	1	1976
(Italy)	Corrado Barazzutti	1	1976
(Italy)	Paolo Bertolucci	1	1976
(Australia)	John Alexander	1	1977
(Australia)	Phil Dent	1	1977
(Australia)	Ross Case	1	1977
(United States)	Fred McNair	1	1978
(United States)	Dick Stockton	1	1979
(Czechoslovakia)	Ivan Lendl	1	1980
(Czechoslovakia)	Tomáš Šmíd	1	1980
(Czechoslovakia)	Jan Kodeš	1	1980
(Czechoslovakia)	Pavel Složil	1	1980
(Czechoslovakia)	Stanislav Birner	1	1980
(United States)	Roscoe Tanner	1	1981
(United States)	Jimmy Connors	1	1981
(United States)	Gene Mayer	1	1982
(Sweden)	Hans Simonsson	1	1984
(Sweden)	Thomas Högstedt	1	1985
(Australia)	Peter McNamara	1	1986
(Sweden)	Mikael Pernfors	1	1987
(Sweden)	Kent Carlsson	1	1987
(United States)	Michael Chang	1	1990
(United States)	Jim Pugh	1	1990
(United States)	Brad Gilbert	1	1990
(United States)	Jay Berger	1	1990
(United States)	Aaron Krickstein	1	1990
(France)	Henri Leconte	1	1991
(France)	Olivier Delaître	1	1991
(Germany)	Michael Stich	1	1993
(Germany)	Marc-Kevin Goellner	1	1993
(Germany)	Bernd Karbacher	1	1993
(Sweden)	Jan Apell	1	1994
(Sweden)	Henrik Holm	1	1994
(United States)	Todd Martin	1	1995
(United States)	Jared Palmer	1	1995
(United States)	Richey Reneberg	1	1995
(United States)	Jonathan Stark	1	1995
(France)	Guillaume Raoux	1	1996
(Sweden)	Magnus Norman	1	1998
(Sweden)	Thomas Johansson	1	1998
(Australia)	Mark Woodforde	1	1999
(Australia)	Patrick Rafter	1	1999
(Australia)	Sandon Stolle	1	1999
(Spain)	Albert Costa	1	2000
(Spain)	Joan Balcells	1	2000
(Spain)	Àlex Corretja	1	2000
(Spain)	Francisco Clavet	1	2000
(France)	Nicolas Escudé	1	2001
(France)	Sébastien Grosjean	1	2001
(France)	Arnaud Clément	1	2001
(Russia)	Yevgeny Kafelnikov	1	2002
(Russia)	Andrei Cherkasov	1	2002
(Russia)	Andrei Stoliarov	1	2002
(Spain)	Carlos Moyá	1	2004
(Spain)	Alberto Martín	1	2004
(Croatia)	Ivan Ljubičić	1	2005
(Croatia)	Mario Ančić	1	2005
(Croatia)	Roko Karanušić	1	2005
(Croatia)	Ivo Karlović	1	2005
(Russia)	Nikolay Davydenko	1	2006
(Russia)	Dmitry Tursunov	1	2006
(Russia)	Igor Andreev	1	2006
(United States)	Andy Roddick	1	2007
(United States)	James Blake	1	2007
(United States)	Bob Bryan	1	2007
(United States)	Mike Bryan	1	2007
(Spain)	Nicolás Almagro	1	2008
(Serbia)	Novak Djokovic	1	2010
(Serbia)	Janko Tipsarević	1	2010
(Serbia)	Viktor Troicki	1	2010
(Serbia)	Nenad Zimonjić	1	2010
(Czech Republic)	František Čermák	1	2012
(Czech Republic)	Ivo Minář	1	2012
(Czech Republic)	Jiří Veselý	1	2013
(Czech Republic)	Jan Hájek	1	2013
(Switzerland)	Roger Federer	1	2014
(Switzerland)	Stanislas Wawrinka	1	2014
(Switzerland)	Michael Lammer	1	2014
(Switzerland)	Marco Chiudinelli	1	2014
(Switzerland)	Henri Laaksonen	1	2014
(United Kingdom)	Andy Murray	1	2015
(United Kingdom)	James Ward	1	2015
(United Kingdom)	Dominic Inglot	1	2015
(United Kingdom)	Jamie Murray	1	2015
(United Kingdom)	Dan Evans	1	2015
(United Kingdom)	Kyle Edmund	1	2015
(Argentina)	Guido Pella	1	2016
(Argentina)	Carlos Berlocq	1	2016
(Argentina)	Renzo Olivo	1	2016
(Argentina)	Federico Delbonis	1	2016
(Argentina)	Juan Mónaco	1	2016
(Argentina)	Juan Martín del Potro	1	2016
(Argentina)	Leonardo Mayer	1	2016
(France)	Richard Gasquet	1	2017
(France)	Gilles Simon	1	2017
(France)	Pierre-Hugues Herbert	1	2017
(France)	Lucas Pouille	1	2017
(France)	Jérémy Chardy	1	2017
(France)	Julien Benneteau	1	2017
(France)	Nicolas Mahut	1	2017
(France)	Jo-Wilfried Tsonga	1	2017
(Croatia)	Borna Ćorić	1	2018
(Croatia)	Marin Čilić	1	2018
(Croatia)	Viktor Galović	1	2018
(Croatia)	Franko Škugor	1	2018
(Croatia)	Ivan Dodig	1	2018
(Croatia)	Nikola Mektić	1	2018
(Croatia)	Mate Pavić	1	2018
(Spain)	Roberto Bautista Agut	1	2019
(Spain)	Pablo Carreño Busta	1	2019
(Russia)	Daniil Medvedev	1	2021
(Russia)	Andrey Rublev	1	2021
(Russia)	Aslan Karatsev	1	2021
(Russia)	Karen Khachanov	1	2021
(Russia)	Evgeny Donskoy	1	2021
(Canada)	Félix Auger-Aliassime	1	2022
(Canada)	Denis Shapovalov	1	2022
(Canada)	Vasek Pospisil	1	2022
(Canada)	Alexis Galarneau	1	2022
(Canada)	Gabriel Diallo	1	2022
(Canada)	Brayden Schnur	1	2022
(Canada)	Peter Polansky	1	2022
(Canada)	Steven Diez	1	2022
(Italy)	Matteo Arnaldi	1	2023
(Italy)	Flavio Cobolli	1	2025
