= 2025 BNP Paribas Open – Women's doubles =

Women's doubles
- 2025 BNP Paribas Open

Final
- Champions: (United States) Asia Muhammad (Netherlands) Demi Schuurs
- Runners-up: (Slovakia) Tereza Mihalíková (United Kingdom) Olivia Nicholls
- Score: 6–2, 7–6^{(7–4)}

Details
- Draw: 32 (3 WC)
- Seeds: 8

Events
Singles	men	women
Doubles	men	women	mixed
← 2024 ·	BNP Paribas Open	· 2026 →

Asia Muhammad and Demi Schuurs defeated Tereza Mihalíková and Olivia Nicholls in the final, 6–2, 7–6^{(7–4)} to win the women's doubles tennis title at the 2025 Indian Wells Open.

Hsieh Su-wei and Elise Mertens were the defending champions, but chose to compete with different partners this year. Hsieh partnered Zhang Shuai, but lost in the semifinals to Mihalíková and Nicholls. Mertens partnered Nadiia Kichenok, but lost in the first round to Anna Kalinskaya and Caty McNally.

== Seeds ==
1. (Czech Republic) Kateřina Siniaková / (United States) Taylor Townsend (semifinals)
2. (Canada) Gabriela Dabrowski / (New Zealand) Erin Routliffe (second round)
3. (Italy) Sara Errani / (Italy) Jasmine Paolini (first round)
4. (Latvia) Jeļena Ostapenko / (Australia) Ellen Perez (quarterfinals)
5. (Chinese Taipei) Hsieh Su-wei / (China) Zhang Shuai (semifinals)
6. (Chinese Taipei) Chan Hao-ching / Veronika Kudermetova (second round)
7. (Kazakhstan) Anna Danilina / Irina Khromacheva (first round)
8. (United States) Sofia Kenin / (Ukraine) Lyudmyla Kichenok (quarterfinals)

== Draw ==
=== Key ===
- Q = Qualifier
- WC = Wild card
- LL = Lucky loser
- Alt = Alternate
- ITF = ITF entry
- PR = Protected ranking
- SR = Special ranking
- SE = Special exempt
- JE = Junior exempt
- JR = Junior Accelerator Programme entrant
- CO = College Accelerator Programme entrant
- NG = Next Gen Accelerator Program entrant
- w/o = Walkover
- r = Retired
- d = Defaulted

=== Finals ===
Semifinals
1	(Czech Republic) Kateřina Siniaková (United States) Taylor Townsend	4	6	[8]
(United States) Asia Muhammad (Netherlands) Demi Schuurs	6	4	[10]
5	(Chinese Taipei) Hsieh Su-wei (China) Zhang Shuai	5	3
(Slovakia) Tereza Mihalíková (United Kingdom) Olivia Nicholls	7	6

Final
(United States) Asia Muhammad (Netherlands) Demi Schuurs	6	7^{7}
(Slovakia) Tereza Mihalíková (United Kingdom) Olivia Nicholls	2	6^{4}

=== Top half ===
First round
1	(Czech Republic) K Siniaková (United States) T Townsend	6	4	[10]
(Norway) U Eikeri (Mexico) G Olmos	2	6	[7]
(Brazil) B Haddad Maia (Germany) L Siegemund	7^{7}	3	[10]
M Andreeva; D Shnaider	6^{4}	6	[4]
(China) X Jiang (Chinese Taipei) F-h Wu	4	6^{7}
PR	(China) Y Xu (China) Z Yang	6	7^{9}
A Panova (Japan) E Shibahara	6	1	[7]
8	(United States) S Kenin (Ukraine) L Kichenok	3	6	[10]
3	(Italy) S Errani (Italy) J Paolini	4	0
(United States) A Muhammad (Netherlands) D Schuurs	6	6
(United States) C Dolehide (Australia) S Hunter	4	6^{4}
E Alexandrova; L Samsonova	6	7^{7}
WC	(Tunisia) O Jabeur (Germany) J Niemeier	1	7^{7}	[4]
(Hungary) T Babos (United States) N Melichar-Martinez	6	6^{5}	[10]
(Spain) C Bucșa (Japan) M Kato	6	3	[6]
6	(Chinese Taipei) H-c Chan; V Kudermetova	2	6	[10]

Second round
1	(Czech Republic) K Siniaková (United States) T Townsend	3	6	[10]
(Brazil) B Haddad Maia (Germany) L Siegemund	6	0	[7]
PR	(China) Y Xu (China) Z Yang	3	6	[6]
8	(United States) S Kenin (Ukraine) L Kichenok	6	4	[10]
(United States) A Muhammad (Netherlands) D Schuurs	6	6
E Alexandrova; L Samsonova	3	4
(Hungary) T Babos (United States) N Melichar-Martinez	7	3	[10]
6	(Chinese Taipei) H-c Chan; V Kudermetova	5	6	[8]

Quarterfinals
1	(Czech Republic) K Siniaková (United States) T Townsend	7	7^{7}
8	(United States) S Kenin (Ukraine) L Kichenok	5	6^{4}
(United States) A Muhammad (Netherlands) D Schuurs	6	6
(Hungary) T Babos (United States) N Melichar-Martinez	2	2

Semifinals
1	(Czech Republic) K Siniaková (United States) T Townsend	4	6	[8]
(United States) A Muhammad (Netherlands) D Schuurs	6	4	[10]

=== Bottom half ===
First round
5	(Chinese Taipei) S-w Hsieh (China) S Zhang	6	6
(Japan) S Aoyama (Japan) E Hozumi	4	4
WC	(United States) M Jones (United States) M Kessler	6	6
(Czech Republic) M Bouzková (United States) B Mattek-Sands	2	4
(Japan) M Ninomiya (Spain) S Sorribes Tormo	0	6	[5]
(Kazakhstan) Y Putintseva (Denmark) C Tauson	6	4	[10]
(United States) D Collins (United States) D Krawczyk	1	6^{5}
4	(Latvia) J Ostapenko (Australia) E Perez	6	7^{7}
7	(Kazakhstan) A Danilina; I Khromacheva	6	3	[8]
(Slovakia) T Mihalíková (United Kingdom) O Nicholls	3	6	[10]
(United States) A Krueger (United States) J Pegula	6	1	[9]
(Hungary) F Stollár (Indonesia) A Sutjiadi	4	6	[11]
WC	A Kalinskaya (United States) C McNally	4	6	[10]
(Ukraine) N Kichenok (Belgium) E Mertens	6	2	[7]
(Canada) L Fernandez (Brazil) L Stefani	7	3	[1]
2	(Canada) G Dabrowski (New Zealand) E Routliffe	5	6	[10]

Second round
5	(Chinese Taipei) S-w Hsieh (China) S Zhang	6	6
WC	(United States) M Jones (United States) M Kessler	2	3
(Kazakhstan) Y Putintseva (Denmark) C Tauson	6^{4}	4
4	(Latvia) J Ostapenko (Australia) E Perez	7^{7}	6
(Slovakia) T Mihalíková (United Kingdom) O Nicholls	6	4	[10]
(Hungary) F Stollár (Indonesia) A Sutjiadi	1	6	[2]
WC	A Kalinskaya (United States) C McNally	7^{7}	7
2	(Canada) G Dabrowski (New Zealand) E Routliffe	6^{4}	5

Quarterfinals
5	(Chinese Taipei) S-w Hsieh (China) S Zhang	7	6
4	(Latvia) J Ostapenko (Australia) E Perez	5	4
(Slovakia) T Mihalíková (United Kingdom) O Nicholls	6	7^{7}
WC	A Kalinskaya (United States) C McNally	4	6^{1}

Semifinals
5	(Chinese Taipei) S-w Hsieh (China) S Zhang	5	3
(Slovakia) T Mihalíková (United Kingdom) O Nicholls	7	6

== Seeded teams ==
The following are the seeded teams. Seedings are based on WTA rankings as of 24 February 2025.

Country	Player	Country	Player	Rank	Seed
CZE	Kateřina Siniaková	USA	Taylor Townsend	3	1
CAN	Gabriela Dabrowski	NZL	Erin Routliffe	7	2
ITA	Sara Errani	ITA	Jasmine Paolini	13	3
LAT	Jeļena Ostapenko	AUS	Ellen Perez	14	4
TPE	Hsieh Su-wei	CHN	Zhang Shuai	24	5
TPE	Chan Hao-ching		Veronika Kudermetova	28	6
KAZ	Anna Danilina		Irina Khromacheva	35	7
USA	Sofia Kenin	UKR	Lyudmyla Kichenok	37	8

== Other entry information ==
=== Wildcards ===
- (Tunisia) Ons Jabeur / (Germany) Jule Niemeier
- (United States) Makenna Jones / (United States) McCartney Kessler
- Anna Kalinskaya / (United States) Caty McNally

=== Protected ranking ===
- (China) Xu Yifan / (China) Yang Zhaoxuan
