= 2025 BNP Paribas Open =

- Date: March 5–16
- Edition: 51st (ATP) / 36th (WTA)
- Category: ATP Tour Masters 1000 (Men); WTA 1000 (Women)
- Draw: 96S / 32D
- Prize money: $9,693,540 (ATP) $9,489,532 (WTA)
- Surface: Hard
- Location: Indian Wells, California, United States
- Venue: Indian Wells Tennis Garden

Champions

Men's singles
- (United Kingdom) Jack Draper

Women's singles
- Mirra Andreeva

Men's doubles
- (El Salvador) Marcelo Arévalo / (Croatia) Mate Pavić

Women's doubles
- (United States) Asia Muhammad / (Netherlands) Demi Schuurs

Mixed doubles
- (Italy) Sara Errani / (Italy) Andrea Vavassori
- Indian Wells Open

The 2025 Indian Wells Open (called the BNP Paribas Open for sponsorship reasons) is a professional men's and women's tennis tournament played in Indian Wells, California. It is the 51st edition of the men's event and 36th of the women's event and is classified as an ATP Tour Masters 1000 event on the 2025 ATP Tour and a WTA 1000 event on the 2025 WTA Tour. The men's and women's main draw events take place from March 5 through 16, 2025 on outdoor hardcourts at the Indian Wells Tennis Garden.

== Champions ==
=== Men's Singles ===
- (United Kingdom) Jack Draper def. (Denmark) Holger Rune 6–2, 6–2

=== Women's Singles ===
- Mirra Andreeva def. Aryna Sabalenka 2–6, 6–4, 6–3

=== Men's Doubles ===
- (El Salvador) Marcelo Arévalo / (Croatia) Mate Pavić def. (United States) Sebastian Korda / (Australia) Jordan Thompson, 6–3, 6–4

=== Women's Doubles ===
- (United States) Asia Muhammad / (Netherlands) Demi Schuurs def. (Slovakia) Tereza Mihalíková / (United Kingdom) Olivia Nicholls, 6–2, 7–6^{(7–4)}

=== Mixed Doubles ===
- (Italy) Sara Errani / (Italy) Andrea Vavassori def. (United States) Bethanie Mattek-Sands / (Croatia) Mate Pavić, 6–7^{(3–7)}, 6–3, [10–8]

== Points and prize money ==
=== Point distribution ===
| Event | W | F | SF | QF | R16 | R32 | R64 | R128 | Q | Q2 | Q1 |
| Men's singles | 1000 | 650 | 400 | 200 | 100 | 50 | 30* | 10** | 20 | 10 | 0 |
| Men's doubles | 1000 | 600 | 360 | 180 | 90 | 0 | —N/a | —N/a | —N/a | —N/a | —N/a |
| Women's singles | 1000 | 650 | 390 | 215 | 120 | 65 | 35* | 10 | 30 | 20 | 2 |
| Women's doubles | 1000 | 650 | 390 | 215 | 120 | 10 | —N/a | —N/a | —N/a | —N/a | —N/a |

* Players with byes receive first-round points.
** Singles players with wild cards earn 0 points.

=== Prize money ===
For the first time since 2009, the prize money at the 2025 BNP Paribas Open was not distributed equally between the ATP and WTA tours, with a 2.13% difference between the two. The total combined prize money was $19,387,080, with the ATP tour receiving $9,693,540 and the WTA tour receiving $9,489,532. This represented a rise of 6.63% from 2024.

In addition, the champion's prize money increased for 2025, with the men's winner receiving $1,201,125 and the women's winner $1,127,500 (up from $1,100,000 in 2024). Meanwhile, men's first-round losers' pay decreased by 15.56% ($30,050 in 2024 vs $25,375 in 2025).

| Event | W | F | SF | QF | R16 | R32 | R64 | R128 | Q2 | Q1 |
|---|---|---|---|---|---|---|---|---|---|---|
| Men's singles | $1,201,125 | $638,750 | $354,850 | $202,000 | $110,250 | $64,500 | $37,650 | $25,375 | $14,730 | $7,640 |
| Women's singles | $1,127,500 | $599,625 | $333,125 | $189,625 | $103,525 | $60,578 | $43,050 | $30,801 | $14,760 | $7,995 |
| Men's doubles* | $457,150 | $242,020 | $129,970 | $65,000 | $34,850 | $19,050 | —N/a | —N/a | —N/a | —N/a |
| Women's doubles* | $458,483 | $242,716 | $130,349 | $65,190 | $34,953 | $19,106 | —N/a | —N/a | —N/a | —N/a |

*per team

== See also ==
- 2025 ATP Tour
- 2025 WTA Tour
- ATP Tour Masters 1000
- WTA 1000 tournaments
