= Viña Challenger =

Defunct tennis tournament
- Event name: Viña Challenger Tennis
- Location: Viña del Mar, Chile
- Venue: Club de Tenis Union
- Category: ATP Challenger Tour
- Surface: Clay
- Website: website

The Viña Challenger Tennis was a professional tennis tournament played on clay courts. It was part of the Association of Tennis Professionals (ATP) Challenger Tour. It was held in Viña del Mar, Chile in 2023.

== Past finals ==
=== Singles ===
Year	Champion	Runner-up	Score
2023	(Brazil) Thiago Seyboth Wild	(France) Hugo Gaston	7–5, 6–1

=== Doubles ===
Year	Champions	Runners-up	Score
2023	(Ecuador) Diego Hidalgo (Colombia) Cristian Rodríguez	(Italy) Luciano Darderi (Italy) Andrea Vavassori	6–4, 7–6^{(7–5)}
