= Andrea Vavassori =

Italian tennis player (born 1995)

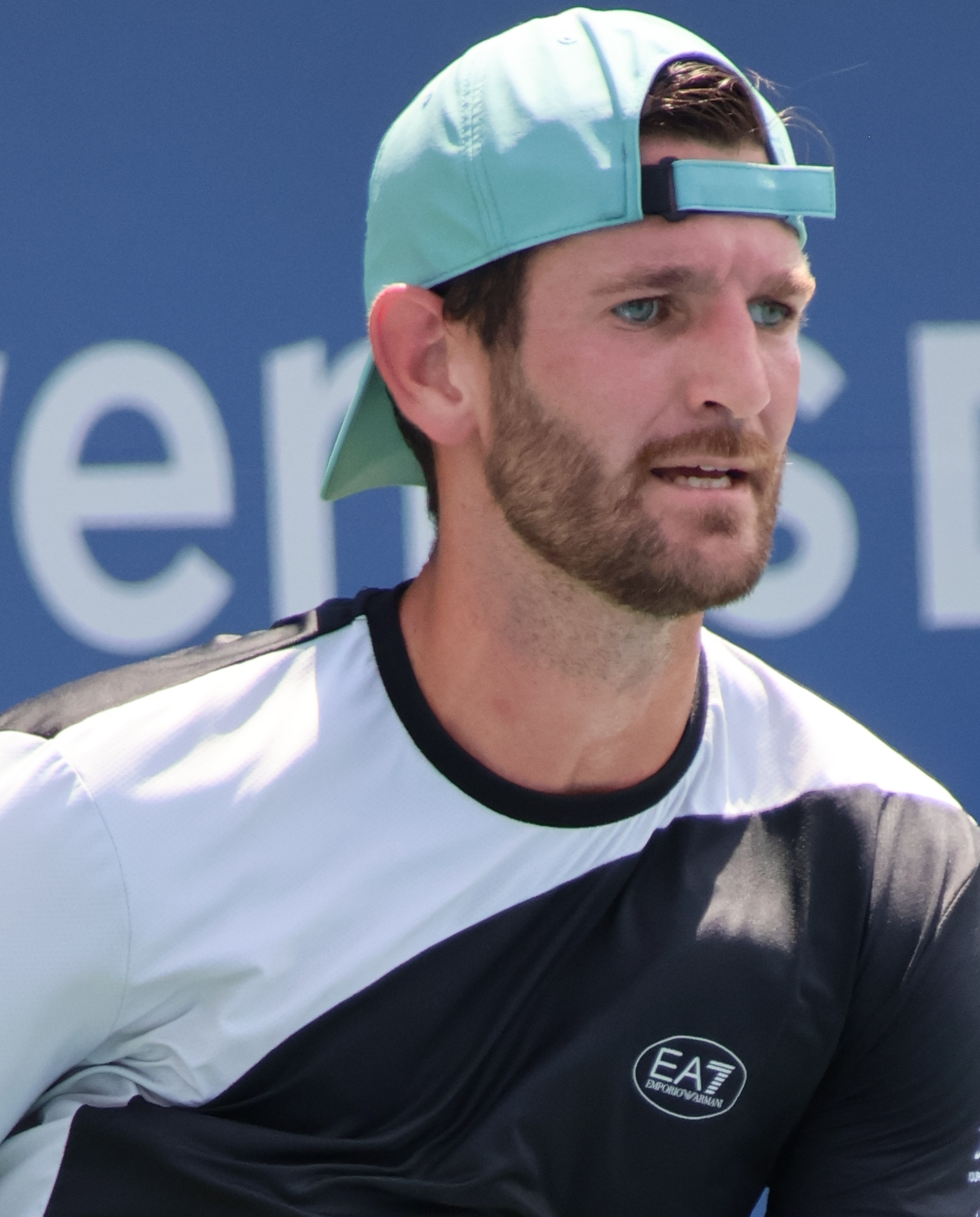
- Vavassori at the 2025 Mubadala Citi DC Open
- Country (sports): Italy
- Residence: Pinerolo, Italy
- Born: 5 May 1995 (age 31) Turin, Italy
- Height: 1.93 m (6 ft 4 in)
- Turned pro: 2014
- Plays: Right-handed (one-handed backhand)
- Coach: Davide Vavassori
- Prize money: $ 4,579,223

Singles
- Career record: 10–13
- Highest ranking: No. 128 (19 June 2023)
- Current ranking: No. 556 (25 May 2026)

Grand Slam singles results
- Australian Open: Q3 (2024)
- French Open: 2R (2023)
- Wimbledon: 1R (2022)
- US Open: Q2 (2023)

Other tournaments
- Olympic Games: 2R (2024)

Doubles
- Career record: 164–102
- Career titles: 13
- Highest ranking: No. 6 (14 October 2024)
- Current ranking: No. 14 (3 November 2025)

Grand Slam doubles results
- Australian Open: F (2024, 2025)
- French Open: F (2024)
- Wimbledon: 3R (2026)
- US Open: QF (2026)

Other doubles tournaments
- Tour Finals: SF (2025)
- Olympic Games: 1R (2024)

Mixed doubles
- Career titles: 5

Grand Slam mixed doubles results
- Australian Open: 2R (2024, 2025)
- French Open: W (2025, 2026)
- Wimbledon: 2R (2023, 2025, 2026)
- US Open: W (2024, 2025)

Other mixed doubles tournaments
- Olympic Games: QF (2024)

Team competitions
- Davis Cup: W (2024, 2025); Record: 1–2
- Last updated on: 25 May 2026.

Andrea Vavassori (Italian pronunciation: [anˈdrɛːa vavasˈsoːri]; born 5 May 1995) is an Italian professional tennis player. He has a career high ATP doubles ranking of world No. 6, achieved on 14 October 2024, and a singles ranking of world No. 128, achieved on 19 June 2023. Vavassori is a four-time Grand Slam champion in mixed doubles, having won the US Open in 2024 and 2025 and the French Open in 2025 and 2026, all with compatriot Sara Errani. He also reached three major finals with Simone Bolelli at the 2024 and the 2025 Australian Open, and at the 2024 French Open. Vavassori was part of the Italian team that won the 2024 and 2025 Davis Cups.

== Career ==
=== 2021: Maiden doubles title ===
He won his maiden doubles title at the 2021 Sardegna Open partnering Lorenzo Sonego.

=== 2022: Grand Slam debut in singles ===
He qualified at the 2022 Wimbledon Championships making his Grand Slam singles debut. He then got eliminated in the first round by the 23rd seed Frances Tiafoe in straight sets losing 6–4, 6–4, 6–4.

=== 2023: ATP & Masters debuts, ATP quarterfinal, Davis Cup win ===
He qualified in singles for the 2023 Córdoba Open. He won his second doubles title with Andrea Pellegrino at the 2023 Chile Open. As a result, he reached the top 50 in the doubles rankings on 20 March 2023.

At the 2023 Grand Prix Hassan II he reached his first ATP singles quarterfinal as a qualifier defeating eight seed Nicolás Jarry and Jaume Munar. At the same tournament in doubles he won his third doubles title with Marcelo Demoliner.

Ranked No. 164 he qualified for his first Masters 1000 at the 2023 Mutua Madrid Open and defeated Andy Murray in the first round.

Following the 2023 Sardegna Open where he received a wildcard, he reached the top 150 at No. 145 on 8 May 2023. He made his debut for the second time at a Major, at the 2023 French Open after qualifying into the main draw. After saving five match points, he overcame world No. 37 and 31st seed Miomir Kecmanović in 5 hours and 10 minutes, the second longest match of the season after Kokkinakis against Murray at the Australian Open, for his first Grand Slam win. He lost to fellow first time Major qualifier Genaro Alberto Olivieri in the second round.

He made his ATP grass court debut at the 2023 Halle Open as a lucky loser after competing in qualifying as an alternate. At the same tournament, in doubles, he reached the final with new partner, compatriot Simone Bolelli.

=== 2024: Major mixed title & doubles finals, Olympics debut, World No. 6 ===
Partnering with Simone Bolelli, he reached his first Grand Slam final at the Australian Open. They overcame unseeded pair of Yannick Hanfmann and Dominik Koepfer in three sets. They lost to second seeded pair Rohan Bopanna and Matthew Ebden in straight sets.

He qualified for the Argentina Open defeating Thiago Seyboth Wild and seventh seed Laslo Djere to reach his second ATP singles quarterfinal. The win over Djere, the world No. 35, was his best career win ranking wise and biggest in his career thus far. He lost to world No. 2 Carlos Alcaraz in straight sets, in just his second match against a top-10 player.

At the Miami Open he also reached the singles main draw after qualifying, making his debut at this Masters and recorded his first round win over Pedro Cachin but lost to second seed and eventual champion Jannik Sinner. Ranked No. 156, he entered the main draw at the Barcelona Open as a lucky loser directly into the second round replacing seventh seed Karen Khachanov after his late withdrawal. Following the Italian Open where he made the semifinals with Bolleli, he reached the top 20 in the doubles rankings on 20 May 2024.

At the French Open, he reached his second Major final in doubles with Bolleli, defeating third seeds Rajeev Ram and Joe Salisbury, and then second seeds Rohan Bopanna and Matthew Ebden. As a result, he reached the top 10 in the doubles rankings on 10 June 2024. In the grass season the pair won their first grass court title together, at the 2024 Halle Open.

On his debut, he qualified for the Paris Olympics in singles and doubles. In singles, he recorded his first win at the Games, as an alternate, over Pedro Martinez.

Partnering Sara Errani, he won the mixed doubles title at the US Open, defeating Taylor Townsend and Donald Young in the final. Vavassori and Bolelli won the China Open in October, defeating third seeds Harri Heliövaara and Henry Patten in the final. As a result he reached a new career-high ATP doubles ranking of World No. 6 on 14 October 2024. The duo Vavassori and Bolelli won the 2024 ATP Fans’ Favourite doubles team award.

=== 2025: Australian Open doubles final, Major mixed titles ===
Vavassori and Bolelli won the Adelaide International, defeating Kevin Krawietz and Tim Pütz in the final. The pair reached the final at the Australian Open, losing to sixth seeds Harri Heliövaara and Henry Patten.

Ranked No. 316, he qualified for the singles main draw of the ATP 500 2025 ABN AMRO Open where he upset former Rotterdam champion Félix Auger-Aliassime following his retirement from the match. He lost again to Carlos Alcaraz.

=== 2026: First ATP Masters title ===
At the 2026 Adelaide International Vavassori qualified for the main draw, having entered the qualifying competition as an alternate. He upset world No. 41 Gabriel Diallo in the first round.

In March, he and Bolelli won their maiden ATP 1000 title at the Miami Open, defeating Harri Heliövaara and Henry Patten in the final.

== Performance timelines ==
Key
W	F	SF	QF	#R	RR	Q#	P#	DNQ	A	Z#	PO	G	S	B	NMS	NTI	P	NH

(W) winner; (F) finalist; (SF) semifinalist; (QF) quarterfinalist; (#R) rounds 4, 3, 2, 1; (RR) round-robin stage; (Q#) qualification round; (P#) preliminary round; (DNQ) did not qualify; (A) absent; (Z#) Davis/Fed Cup Zonal Group (with number indication) or (PO) play-off; (G) gold, (S) silver or (B) bronze Olympic/Paralympic medal; (NMS) not a Masters tournament; (NTI) not a Tier I tournament; (P) postponed; (NH) not held; (SR) strike rate (events won / competed); (W–L) win–loss record.
To avoid confusion and double counting, these charts are updated at the conclusion of a tournament or when the player's participation has ended.

=== Singles ===
Tournament	2021	2022	2023	2024	SR	W–L	Win %
Grand Slam tournaments
Australian Open	A	Q2	Q1	Q3	0 / 0	0–0	–
French Open	A	A	2R	Q3	0 / 1	1–1	50%
Wimbledon	A	1R	Q1	Q1	0 / 1	0–1	0%
US Open	A	Q1	Q2	Q1	0 / 0	0–0	–
ATP Tour Masters 1000
Indian Wells Masters	A	A	A	Q2	0 / 0	0–0	–
Miami Open	A	A	A	2R	0 / 1	1–1	50%
Monte-Carlo Masters	A	A	Q2	A	0 / 0	0–0	–
Madrid Open	A	A	2R	Q1	0 / 1	1–1	50%
Italian Open	A	A	1R	1R	0 / 2	0–2	0%
Win–loss	0–0	0–0	1–2	1–2	0 / 4	2–4	33%

=== Doubles ===
Tournament	2018	2019	2020	2021	2022	2023	2024	2025	2026	SR	W–L	Win %
Grand Slam tournaments
Australian Open	A	A	A	2R	1R	2R	F	F	1R	0 / 6	12–6	67%
French Open	A	A	A	1R	2R	1R	F	3R	SF	0 / 6	12–6	67%
Wimbledon	A	A	NH	1R	2R	2R	1R	2R		0 / 5	3–5	38%
US Open	A	A	A	A	3R	1R	3R	2R		0 / 4	5–4	56%
Win–loss	0–0	0–0	0–0	1–3	4–4	2–4	12–4	9–4	4–2	0 / 21	32–21	60%
Year-end championship
ATP Finals	Did not qualify						RR	SF		0 / 2	3–4	43%
ATP Masters 1000
Indian Wells Masters	A	A	NH	A	A	A	SF	1R	QF	0 / 3	4–3	57%
Miami Open	A	A	NH	A	A	A	1R	2R	W	1 / 3	6–2	75%
Monte-Carlo Masters	A	A	NH	A	A	A	QF	2R	2R	0 / 3	3–3	50%
Madrid Open	A	A	NH	A	A	A	QF	1R	1R	0 / 3	2–3	40%
Italian Open	1R	A	QF	1R	A	2R	SF	1R	W	1 / 7	11–6	65%
Canadian Open	A	A	NH	A	A	A	QF	1R		0 / 2	2–2	50%
Cincinnati Masters	A	A	A	A	A	A	2R	QF		0 / 2	3–2	60%
Shanghai Masters	A	A	NH			A	QF	1R		0 / 2	2–2	50%
Paris Masters	A	A	A	A	A	A	2R	2R		0 / 2	1–2	33%
Win–loss	0–1	0–0	2–1	0–1	0–0	1–1	14–9	4–9	13–3	2 / 27	34–25	58%

== Grand Slam tournament finals ==
=== Doubles: 3 (3 runner-ups) ===
Result	Year	Tournament	Surface	Partner	Opponents	Score
Loss	2024	Australian Open	Hard	(Italy) Simone Bolelli	(India) Rohan Bopanna (Australia) Matthew Ebden	6–7^{(0–7)}, 5–7
Loss	2024	French Open	Clay	(Italy) Simone Bolelli	(El Salvador) Marcelo Arévalo (Croatia) Mate Pavić	5–7, 3–6
Loss	2025	Australian Open	Hard	(Italy) Simone Bolelli	(Finland) Harri Heliövaara (United Kingdom) Henry Patten	7–6^{(18–16)}, 6–7^{(5–7)}, 3–6

=== Mixed doubles: 4 (4 titles) ===
Result	Year	Tournament	Surface	Partner	Opponents	Score
Win	2024	US Open	Hard	(Italy) Sara Errani	(United States) Donald Young (United States) Taylor Townsend	7–6^{(7–0)}, 7–5
Win	2025	French Open	Clay	(Italy) Sara Errani	(United States) Evan King (United States) Taylor Townsend	6–4, 6–2
Win	2025	US Open (2)	Hard	(Italy) Sara Errani	(Norway) Casper Ruud (Poland) Iga Świątek	6–3, 5–7, [10–6]
Win	2026	French Open (2)	Clay	(Italy) Sara Errani	(United States) Evan King (Canada) Gabriela Dabrowski	4–6, 6–3, [10–4]

== Other significant finals ==
=== ATP 1000 tournaments ===
==== Doubles: 2 (2 titles) ====
Result	Year	Tournament	Surface	Partner	Opponents	Score
Win	2026	Miami Open	Hard	(Italy) Simone Bolelli	(Finland) Harri Heliövaara (United Kingdom) Henry Patten	6–4, 6–2
Win	2026	Italian Open	Clay	(Italy) Simone Bolelli	(Spain) Marcel Granollers (Argentina) Horacio Zeballos	7–6^{(10–8)}, 6–7^{(3–7)}, [10–3]

==== Mixed doubles: 1 (title) ====
Result	Year	Tournament	Surface	Partner	Opponents	Score
Win	2025	Indian Wells Open	Hard	(Italy) Sara Errani	(United States) Bethanie Mattek-Sands (Croatia) Mate Pavić	6–7^{(3–7)}, 6–3, [10–8]

== ATP Tour finals ==
=== Doubles: 21 (13 titles, 8 runner-ups) ===
Legend Grand Slam (0–3) ATP Finals (0–0) ATP 1000 (2–0) ATP 500 (6–3) ATP 250 (5–2)	Finals by surface Hard (6–2) Clay (6–4) Grass (1–2)	Finals by setting Outdoor (11–7) Indoor (2–0)

Result	W–L	Date	Tournament	Tier	Surface	Partner	Opponents	Score
Win	1–0	Apr 2021	Sardegna Open, Italy	ATP 250	Clay	(Italy) Lorenzo Sonego	(Italy) Simone Bolelli (Argentina) Andrés Molteni	6–3, 6–4
Loss	1–1	Apr 2022	Grand Prix Hassan II, Morocco	ATP 250	Clay	(Poland) Jan Zieliński	(Brazil) Rafael Matos (Spain) David Vega Hernández	1–6, 5–7
Win	2–1	Mar 2023	Chile Open, Chile	ATP 250	Clay	(Italy) Andrea Pellegrino	(Brazil) Thiago Seyboth Wild (Chile) Matías Soto	6–4, 3–6, [12–10]
Win	3–1	Apr 2023	Grand Prix Hassan II, Morocco	ATP 250	Clay	(Brazil) Marcelo Demoliner	(Austria) Alexander Erler (Austria) Lucas Miedler	6–4, 3–6, [12–10]
Loss	3–2	Jun 2023	Halle Open, Germany	ATP 500	Grass	(Italy) Simone Bolelli	(Brazil) Marcelo Melo (Australia) John Peers	6–7^{(3–7)}, 6–3, [6–10]
Loss	3–3	Jul 2023	Croatia Open, Croatia	ATP 250	Clay	(Italy) Simone Bolelli	(Slovenia) Blaž Rola (Croatia) Nino Serdarušić	6–4, 6–7^{(2–7)}, [13–15]
Loss	3–4	Jan 2024	Australian Open, Australia	Grand Slam	Hard	(Italy) Simone Bolelli	(India) Rohan Bopanna (Australia) Matthew Ebden	6–7^{(0–7)}, 5–7
Win	4–4	Feb 2024	Argentina Open, Argentina	ATP 250	Clay	(Italy) Simone Bolelli	(Spain) Marcel Granollers (Argentina) Horacio Zeballos	6–2, 7–6^{(8–6)}
Loss	4–5	Jun 2024	French Open, France	Grand Slam	Clay	(Italy) Simone Bolelli	(El Salvador) Marcelo Arévalo (Croatia) Mate Pavić	5–7, 3–6
Win	5–5	Jun 2024	Halle Open, Germany	ATP 500	Grass	(Italy) Simone Bolelli	(Germany) Kevin Krawietz (Germany) Tim Pütz	7–6^{(7–3)}, 7–6^{(7–5)}
Win	6–5	Oct 2024	China Open, China	ATP 500	Hard	(Italy) Simone Bolelli	(Finland) Harri Heliövaara (United Kingdom) Henry Patten	4–6, 6–3, [10–5]
Win	7–5	Jan 2025	Adelaide International, Australia	ATP 250	Hard	(Italy) Simone Bolelli	(Germany) Kevin Krawietz (Germany) Tim Pütz	4–6, 7–6^{(7–4)}, [11–9]
Loss	7–6	Jan 2025	Australian Open, Australia	Grand Slam	Hard	(Italy) Simone Bolelli	(Finland) Harri Heliövaara (United Kingdom) Henry Patten	7–6^{(18–16)}, 6–7^{(5–7)}, 3–6
Win	8–6	Feb 2025	Rotterdam Open, Netherlands	ATP 500	Hard (i)	(Italy) Simone Bolelli	(Belgium) Sander Gillé (Poland) Jan Zieliński	6–2, 4–6, [10–6]
Win	9–6	May 2025	Hamburg Open, Germany	ATP 500	Clay	(Italy) Simone Bolelli	(Argentina) Andrés Molteni (Brazil) Fernando Romboli	6–4, 6–0
Loss	9–7	Jun 2025	Halle Open, Germany	ATP 500	Grass	(Italy) Simone Bolelli	(Germany) Kevin Krawietz (Germany) Tim Pütz	3–6, 6–7^{(4–7)}
Win	10–7	Jul 2025	Washington Open, United States	ATP 500	Hard	(Italy) Simone Bolelli	(Monaco) Hugo Nys (France) Édouard Roger-Vasselin	6–3, 6–4
Win	11–7	Feb 2026	Rotterdam Open, Netherlands	ATP 500	Hard (i)	(Italy) Simone Bolelli	(Chinese Taipei) Ray Ho (Germany) Hendrik Jebens	6–3, 6–4
Win	12–7	Mar 2026	Miami Open, United States	Masters 1000	Hard	(Italy) Simone Bolelli	(Finland) Harri Heliövaara (United Kingdom) Henry Patten	6–4, 6–2
Loss	12–8	Apr 2026	Barcelona Open, Spain	ATP 500	Clay	(France) Pierre-Hugues Herbert	(United Kingdom) Julian Cash (United Kingdom) Lloyd Glasspool	3–6, 4–6
Win	13–8	May 2026	Italian Open, Italy	Masters 1000	Clay	(Italy) Simone Bolelli	(Spain) Marcel Granollers (Argentina) Horacio Zeballos	7–6^{(10–8)}, 6–7^{(3–7)}, [10–3]

=== Mixed doubles Masters: 1 title ===
Result	Year	Tournament	Surface	Partner	Opponents	Score
Win	2025	Indian Wells	Hard	(Italy) Sara Errani	(United States) Bethanie Mattek-Sands (Croatia) Mate Pavić	6–7^{(3–7)}, 6–3, [10–8]

== ATP Challenger and ITF Futures/World Tennis Tour finals ==
=== Singles: 7 (0–7) ===
Legend ATP Challenger Tour (0–3) ITF Futures/World Tennis Tour (0–4)	Finals by surface Hard (0–5) Clay (0–2)

Result	W–L	Date	Tournament	Tier	Surface	Opponent	Score
Loss	0–1	Apr 2016	Egypt F11, Sharm El Sheikh	Futures	Hard	(Czech Republic) Jaroslav Pospíšil	4–6, 4–6
Loss	0–2	Jul 2016	Egypt F17, Sharm El Sheikh	Futures	Hard	(Italy) Lorenzo Frigerio	1–6, 6–7^{(6–8)}
Loss	0–3	Oct 2016	Egypt F27, Sharm El Sheikh	Futures	Hard	(South Africa) Lloyd Harris	4–6, 2–6
Loss	0–4	Jan 2020	M15 Te Anau, New Zealand	World Tennis Tour	Hard	(Australia) Luke Saville	3–6, 1–6
Loss	0–5	Jul 2022	San Benedetto, Italy	Challenger	Clay	(Italy) Raúl Brancaccio	1–6, 1–6
Loss	0–6	Aug 2022	Cordenons, Italy	Challenger	Clay	(China) Zhang Zhizhen	6–2, 6–7^{(5–7)}, 3–6
Loss	0–7	Feb 2025	Manama, Bahrain	Challenger	Hard	(Hungary) Márton Fucsovics	3–6, 7–6^{(7–3)}, 4–6

=== Doubles: 56 (28–28) ===
Legend ATP Challenger Tour (16–16) ITF Futures (12–12)	Finals by surface Hard (8–13) Clay (19–15) Grass (0–0) Carpet (1–0)

Result	W–L	Date	Tournament	Tier	Surface	Partner	Opponents	Score
Loss	0–1	Jul 2015	Italy F18, Modena	Futures	Clay	(Italy) Alessandro Luisi	(Argentina) Andrea Collarini (Argentina) Tomás Lipovšek Puches	5–7, 7–5, [7–10]
Loss	0–2	Aug 2015	Italy F24, Piombino	Futures	Hard	(Italy) Jacopo Stefanini	(Netherlands) Mark Vervoort (Serbia) Ilija Vučić	6–7^{(6–8)}, 2–6
Win	1–2	Feb 2016	Great Britain F2, Sunderland	Futures	Hard (i)	(Germany) George von Massow	(United Kingdom) Lloyd Glasspool (United Kingdom) Joshua Ward-Hibbert	7–5, 6–3
Win	2–2	Mar 2016	Italy F1, Trento	Futures	Carpet (i)	(Italy) Riccardo Sinicropi	(France) Jonathan Kanar (France) Hugo Voljacques	6–2, 6–1
Win	3–2	May 2016	Italy F11, Frascati	Futures	Clay	(Italy) Riccardo Sinicropi	(Turkey) Tuna Altuna (Italy) Adelchi Virgili	4–6, 6–3, [10–1]
Loss	3–3	May 2016	Italy F12, Lecco	Futures	Clay	(Italy) Matteo Volante	(Turkey) Tuna Altuna (Poland) Andriej Kapaś	7–6^{(9–7)}, 2–6, [7–10]
Win	4–3	Jun 2016	Zimbabwe F1, Harare	Futures	Hard	(France) Hugo Nys	(Zimbabwe) Benjamin Lock (Zimbabwe) Courtney John Lock	6–3, 6–3
Loss	4–4	Jul 2016	Egypt F17, Sharm El Sheikh	Futures	Hard	(Italy) Lorenzo Frigerio	(Czech Republic) Marek Jaloviec (Australia) Bradley Mousley	6–2, 3–6, [4–10]
Loss	4–5	Aug 2016	Egypt F18, Sharm El Sheikh	Futures	Hard	(Italy) Luca Pancaldi	(Czech Republic) Marek Jaloviec (Australia) Bradley Mousley	1–6, 2–6
Win	5–5	Aug 2016	Egypt F19, Sharm El Sheikh	Futures	Hard	(Italy) Luca Pancaldi	(Czech Republic) Marek Jaloviec (Czech Republic) Tomáš Papik	6–7^{(5–7)}, 7–6^{(12–10)}, [10–6]
Win	6–5	Aug 2016	Italy F26, Piombino	Futures	Hard	(Italy) Jacopo Stefanini	(France) Hugo Grenier (France) Yannick Jankovits	6–3, 6–4
Loss	6–6	Sep 2016	Italy F28, Reggio Emilia	Futures	Clay	(Italy) Andrea Pellegrino	(Italy) Matteo Berrettini (Italy) Jacopo Stefani	3–6, 6–7^{(5–7)}
Loss	6–7	Oct 2016	Egypt F27, Sharm El Sheikh	Futures	Hard	(Italy) Antonio Massara	(Poland) Piotr Matuszewski (Poland) Kacper Żuk	3–6, 2–6
Loss	6–8	Oct 2016	Egypt F28, Sharm El Sheikh	Futures	Hard	(Italy) Antonio Massara	(Poland) Kamil Gajewski (Poland) Szymon Walków	6–7^{(6–8)}, 3–6
Loss	6–9	Feb 2017	Great Britain F2, Tipton	Futures	Hard (i)	(Italy) Andrea Pellegrino	(Germany) Jannis Kahlke (Germany) Oscar Otte	7–5, 2–6, [5–10]
Loss	6–10	May 2017	Italy F14, Frascati	Futures	Clay	(Italy) Federico Maccari	(Australia) Alex Bolt (Australia) Jason Kubler	1–6, 6–7^{(6–8)}
Win	7–10	Jun 2017	Italy F16, Padova	Futures	Clay	(Italy) Julian Ocleppo	(Argentina) Franco Agamenone (Argentina) Facundo Mena	4–6, 6–1, [10–8]
Win	8–10	Jun 2017	Italy F17, Bergamo	Futures	Clay	(Italy) Walter Trusendi	(Argentina) Franco Agamenone (Brazil) Fernando Romboli	6–1, 3–6, [13–11]
Loss	8–11	Jul 2017	Recanati, Italy	Challenger	Clay	(Italy) Julian Ocleppo	(France) Jonathan Eysseric (France) Quentin Halys	7–6^{(7–3)}, 4–6, [10–12]
Win	9–11	Jul 2017	Egypt F20, Sharm El Sheikh	Futures	Hard	(Italy) Julian Ocleppo	(United States) Nathaniel Lammons (Portugal) Bernardo Saraiva	2–6, 6–3, [10–8]
Loss	9–12	Sep 2017	Italy F29, Santa Margherita di Pula	Futures	Clay	(Italy) Cristian Carli	(Sweden) Fred Simonsson (Italy) Corrado Summaria	1–6, 4–6
Win	10–12	Oct 2017	Italy F32, Santa Margherita di Pula	Futures	Clay	(Italy) Walter Trusendi	(United States) Hunter Johnson (United States) Yates Johnson	7–6^{(7–3)}, 6–3
Loss	10–13	Oct 2017	Italy F33, Santa Margherita di Pula	Futures	Clay	(Italy) Walter Trusendi	(Italy) Omar Giacalone (Italy) Jacopo Stefanini	5–7, 2–6
Win	11–13	Nov 2017	Italy F36, Santa Margherita di Pula	Futures	Clay	(Italy) Alessandro Motti	(Spain) Marc Fornell Mestres (Portugal) Fred Gil	3–6, 6–4, [10–8]
Win	12–13	Nov 2017	Andria, Italy	Challenger	Hard (i)	(Italy) Lorenzo Sonego	(Netherlands) Sander Arends (Belgium) Sander Gillé	6–3, 3–6, [10–7]
Win	13–13	Feb 2018	Egypt F4, Sharm El Sheikh	Futures	Hard	(Italy) Julian Ocleppo	(Czech Republic) Marek Gengel (Czech Republic) David Poljak	7–5, 6–4
Win	14–13	Apr 2018	Francavilla, Italy	Challenger	Clay	(Italy) Julian Ocleppo	(Uruguay) Ariel Behar (Argentina) Máximo González	7–6^{(7–5)}, 7–6^{(7–3)}
Loss	14–14	Jun 2018	Poznań, Poland	Challenger	Clay	(Hungary) Attila Balázs	(Poland) Mateusz Kowalczyk (Poland) Szymon Walków	5–7, 7–6^{(10–8)}, [8–10]
Win	15–14	Jul 2018	Milan, Italy	Challenger	Clay	(Italy) Julian Ocleppo	(Ecuador) Gonzalo Escobar (Brazil) Fernando Romboli	4–6, 6–1, [11–9]
Win	16–14	Jul 2018	San Benedetto, Italy	Challenger	Clay	(Italy) Julian Ocleppo	(Peru) Sergio Galdós (Bolivia) Federico Zeballos	6–3, 6–2
Loss	16–15	Jul 2018	Padova, Italy	Challenger	Clay	(Italy) Walter Trusendi	(Bosnia and Herzegovina) Tomislav Brkić (Croatia) Ante Pavić	2–6, 6–7^{(4–7)}
Loss	16–16	Jan 2019	Orlando, USA	Challenger	Hard	(Portugal) Gonçalo Oliveira	(Monaco) Romain Arneodo (Belarus) Andrei Vasilevski	6–7^{(2–7)}, 6–2, [13–15]
Win	17–16	Jun 2019	Poznań, Poland	Challenger	Clay	(Spain) David Vega Hernández	(Spain) Pedro Martínez (Netherlands) Mark Vervoort	6–4, 6–7^{(4–7)}, [10–6]
Loss	17-17	Jun 2019	Milan, Italy	Challenger	Clay	(Belarus) Andrei Vasilevski	(Bosnia and Herzegovina) Tomislav Brkić (Croatia) Ante Pavić	6–7^{(6–8)}, 2–6
Loss	17-18	Jul 2019	Recanati, Italy	Challenger	Hard	(Spain) David Vega Hernández	(Portugal) Gonçalo Oliveira (India) Ramkumar Ramanathan	2–6, 4–6
Loss	17-19	Oct 2019	Brest, France	Challenger	Hard (i)	(Spain) David Vega Hernández	(Ukraine) Denys Molchanov (Belarus) Andrei Vasilevski	3–6, 1–6
Loss	17-20	Jan 2020	Nouméa, New Caledonia	Challenger	Hard	(Switzerland) Luca Margaroli	(Italy) Andrea Pellegrino (Spain) Mario Vilella Martínez	6–7^{(1–7)}, 6–3, [10–12]
Loss	17-21	Jan 2020	Burnie, Australia	Challenger	Hard	(Switzerland) Luca Margaroli	(Finland) Harri Heliövaara (Netherlands) Sem Verbeek	6–7^{(5–7)}, 6-7^{(4–7)}
Loss	17-22	Feb 2020	Bergamo, Italy	Challenger	Hard (i)	(Switzerland) Luca Margaroli	(Italy) Julian Ocleppo (Czech Republic) Zdeněk Kolář	4–6, 3–6
Loss	17-23	Sep 2020	Forli, Italy	Challenger	Clay	(Kazakhstan) Andrey Golubev	(Bosnia and Herzegovina) Tomislav Brkić (Serbia) Nikola Ćaćić	6–3, 5–7, [3–10]
Win	18-23	Nov 2020	Maia, Portugal	Challenger	Clay (i)	(Czech Republic) Zdeněk Kolář	(United Kingdom) Lloyd Glasspool (Finland) Harri Heliövaara	6–3, 6–4
Win	19-23	Mar 2021	Lugano, Switzerland	Challenger	Hard (i)	(Germany) Andre Begemann	(Ukraine) Denys Molchanov (Ukraine) Sergiy Stakhovsky	7–6^{(13–11)}, 4–6, [10–8]
Loss	19-24	Aug 2021	Como, Italy	Challenger	Clay	(Venezuela) Luis David Martínez	(Brazil) Rafael Matos (Brazil) Felipe Meligeni Alves	7–6^{(7–2)}, 4–6, [6–10]
Win	20-24	Sep 2021	Tulln an der Donau, Austria	Challenger	Clay	(Germany) Dustin Brown	(Brazil) Rafael Matos (Brazil) Felipe Meligeni Alves	7–6^{(7–5)}, 6–1
Win	21–24	Oct 2021	Naples, Italy	Challenger	Clay	(Germany) Dustin Brown	(Bosnia and Herzegovina) Mirza Bašić (Croatia) Nino Serdarušić	7–5, 7–6^{(7–5)}
Loss	21-25	Oct 2021	Naples, Italy	Challenger	Clay	(Germany) Dustin Brown	(Italy) Marco Bortolotti (Spain) Sergio Martos Gornés	4–6, 6–3, [7–10]
Loss	21-26	Nov 2021	Bari, Italy	Challenger	Hard	(Spain) David Vega Hernández	(United Kingdom) Lloyd Glasspool (Finland) Harri Heliövaara	3–6, 0–6
Win	22–26	Mar 2022	Zadar, Croatia	Challenger	Clay	(Czech Republic) Zdeněk Kolář	(Italy) Franco Agamenone (France) Manuel Guinard	3–6, 7–6^{(9–7)}, [10–6]
Win	23–26	Jul 2022	Verona, Italy	Challenger	Clay	(Venezuela) Luis David Martínez	(Argentina) Juan Ignacio Galarza (Slovenia) Tomás Lipovšek Puches	7–6^{(7–4)}, 3–6, [12–10]
Win	24–26	Aug 2022	Cordenons, Italy	Challenger	Clay	(Jamaica) Dustin Brown	(Serbia) Ivan Sabanov (Serbia) Matej Sabanov	6–4, 7–5
Win	25–26	Sep 2022	Szczecin, Poland	Challenger	Clay	(Jamaica) Dustin Brown	(Czech Republic) Roman Jebavý (Czech Republic) Adam Pavlásek	6–4, 5–7, [10–8]
Win	26–26	Sep 2022	Genoa, Italy	Challenger	Clay	(Jamaica) Dustin Brown	(Czech Republic) Roman Jebavý (Czech Republic) Adam Pavlásek	6–2, 6–2
Loss	26-27	Mar 2023	Viña del Mar, Chile	Challenger	Clay	(Italy) Luciano Darderi	(Ecuador) Diego Hidalgo (Colombia) Cristian Rodríguez	4–6, 6–7^{(5–7)}
Loss	26-28	Apr 2023	Oeiras, Portugal	Challenger	Clay	(Brazil) Marcelo Demoliner	(Romania) Victor Vlad Cornea (Croatia) Franko Škugor	6–7^{(2–7)}, 6–7^{(4–7)}
Win	27–28	Nov 2023	Valencia, Spain	Challenger	Clay	(Italy) Andrea Pellegrino	(Spain) Daniel Rincón (Spain) Oriol Roca Batalla	6–2, 6–4
Win	28–28	Nov 2023	Maia, Portugal	Challenger	Clay (i)	(Italy) Marco Bortolotti	(Brazil) Fernando Romboli (Poland) Szymon Walkow	6–4, 3–6, [12–10]

== See also ==
- List of Grand Slam mixed doubles champions
- Davis Cup winning players

Awards
Preceded by (Russia) Karen Khachanov & (Russia) Andrey Rublev	ATP Fans' Favorite Team; 2024, 2025 (with (Italy) Simone Bolelli)	Succeeded by Incumbent
