= 2019 San Benedetto Tennis Cup – Doubles =

Doubles
- 2019 San Benedetto Tennis Cup

Final
- Champions: (Croatia) Ivan Sabanov (Croatia) Matej Sabanov
- Runners-up: (Peru) Sergio Galdós (Peru) Juan Pablo Varillas
- Score: 6–4, 4–6, [10–5]

Events
Singles	Doubles
← 2018 ·	San Benedetto Tennis Cup	· 2022 →

Julian Ocleppo and Andrea Vavassori were the defending champions but only Vavassori chose to defend his title, partnering Andrea Pellegrino. Vavassori lost in the semifinals to Ivan and Matej Sabanov.

Sabanov and Sabanov won the title after defeating Sergio Galdós and Juan Pablo Varillas 6–4, 4–6, [10–5] in the final.

== Seeds ==
1. (Italy) Andrea Pellegrino / (Italy) Andrea Vavassori (semifinals)
2. (Sweden) Andreas Siljeström / (Poland) Szymon Walków (semifinals)
3. (Ecuador) Emilio Gómez / (Venezuela) Luis David Martínez (first round, withdrew)
4. (Peru) Sergio Galdós / (Peru) Juan Pablo Varillas (final)

== Draw ==
=== Key ===
- Q = Qualifier
- WC = Wild card
- LL = Lucky loser
- Alt = Alternate
- SE = Special exempt
- PR = Protected ranking
- ITF = ITF entry
- JE = Junior exempt
- w/o = Walkover
- r = Retired
- d = Defaulted
- SR = Special ranking

First round
(Colombia) DE Galán (Colombia) S Giraldo	w/o
(Argentina) MF Descotte (Chinese Taipei) T-l Wu
3	(Ecuador) E Gómez (Venezuela) LD Martínez
(Croatia) I Sabanov (Croatia) M Sabanov	w/o
WC	(Italy) Riccardo Balzerani (Italy) F Forti	3	6	[8]
(Dominican Republic) R Cid Subervi (Dominican Republic) J Hernández-Fernández	6	4	[10]
(Czech Republic) V Šafránek (Czech Republic) J Šátral	6	3	[9]
ITF	(Russia) Alexander Igoshin (Russia) R Safiullin	1	6	[4]^{r}
ITF	(Italy) R Bonadio (Belgium) Jeroen Vanneste	6	3	[7]
4	(Peru) S Galdós (Peru) JP Varillas	1	6	[10]
(Italy) A Bega (Norway) V Durasovic	7	7
(France) M Guinard (France) A Müller	5	5
WC	(Italy) A Basso (Italy) W Trusendi	4	4
2	(Sweden) A Siljeström (Poland) S Walków	6	6

Quarterfinals
1	(Italy) A Pellegrino (Italy) A Vavassori	6	6
(Colombia) DE Galán (Colombia) S Giraldo	4	2
(Croatia) I Sabanov (Croatia) M Sabanov	6	6
(Dominican Republic) R Cid Subervi (Dominican Republic) J Hernández-Fernández	1	2
(Czech Republic) V Šafránek (Czech Republic) J Šátral	0	4
4	(Peru) S Galdós (Peru) JP Varillas	6	6
(Italy) A Bega (Norway) V Durasovic	5	3
2	(Sweden) A Siljeström (Poland) S Walków	7	6

Semifinals
1	(Italy) A Pellegrino (Italy) A Vavassori	6	4	[10]
(Croatia) I Sabanov (Croatia) M Sabanov	3	6	[12]
4	(Peru) S Galdós (Peru) JP Varillas	4	6	[10]
2	(Sweden) A Siljeström (Poland) S Walków	6	1	[6]

Final
(Croatia) I Sabanov (Croatia) M Sabanov	6	4	[10]
4	(Peru) S Galdós (Peru) JP Varillas	4	6	[5]
