= 2017 Tempe Challenger =

- Date: 13–19 February
- Edition: 1st
- Surface: Hard
- Location: Tempe, United States

Champions

Singles
- (United States) Tennys Sandgren

Doubles
- (Italy) Walter Trusendi / (Italy) Matteo Viola
Tempe Challenger	· 2018 →

The 2017 Tempe Challenger was a professional tennis tournament played on hard courts. It was the inaugural edition of the tournament which was part of the 2017 ATP Challenger Tour. It took place in Tempe, United States between 13 and 19 February 2017.

== Singles main-draw entrants ==
=== Seeds ===
Country	Player	Rank^{1}	Seed
USA	Ernesto Escobedo	120	1
USA	Stefan Kozlov	121	2
SUI	Henri Laaksonen	124	3
~~CAN~~	~~Vasek Pospisil~~	~~131~~	~~4~~
ARG	Marco Trungelliti	158	5
RUS	Teymuraz Gabashvili	160	6
USA	Dennis Novikov	178	7
ESA	Marcelo Arévalo	181	8

- ^{1} Rankings are as of February 6, 2017.

=== Other entrants ===
The following players received wildcards into the singles main draw:

- (Dominican Republic) Roberto Cid Subervi
- (Belgium) Michael Geerts
- (Denmark) Benjamin Hannestad
- (United States) Bradley Klahn

The following player received entry as an alternate:

- (Italy) Salvatore Caruso

The following players received entry from the qualifying draw:

- (United Kingdom) Luke Bambridge
- (Colombia) Daniel Elahi Galán
- (Chile) Nicolás Jarry
- (Canada) Brayden Schnur

The following player received entry as a lucky loser:

- (Dominican Republic) José Hernández-Fernández

== Champions ==
=== Singles ===
- (United States) Tennys Sandgren def. (Serbia) Nikola Milojević 4–6, 6–0, 6–3.

=== Doubles ===
- (Italy) Walter Trusendi / (Italy) Matteo Viola def. (El Salvador) Marcelo Arévalo / (Dominican Republic) José Hernández-Fernández 5–7, 6–2, [12–10].
