= 2018 San Benedetto Tennis Cup – Singles =

Singles
- 2018 San Benedetto Tennis Cup

Final
- Champion: (Colombia) Daniel Elahi Galán
- Runner-up: (Spain) Sergio Gutiérrez Ferrol
- Score: 6–2, 3–6, 6–2

Events
Singles	Doubles
← 2017 ·	San Benedetto Tennis Cup	· 2019 →

Matteo Berrettini was the defending champion but chose not to defend his title.

Daniel Elahi Galán won the title after defeating Sergio Gutiérrez Ferrol 6–2, 3–6, 6–2 in the final.

== Seeds ==
1. (Serbia) Nikola Milojević (second round, retired)
2. (Spain) Carlos Taberner (semifinals, retired)
3. (Italy) Luca Vanni (quarterfinals)
4. (Italy) Salvatore Caruso (first round)
5. (Spain) Ricardo Ojeda Lara (first round)
6. (Spain) Daniel Gimeno Traver (second round)
7. (Italy) Gianluigi Quinzi (second round)
8. (Colombia) Daniel Elahi Galán (champion)

== Draw ==
=== Key ===
- Q = Qualifier
- WC = Wild card
- LL = Lucky loser
- Alt = Alternate
- SE = Special exempt
- PR = Protected ranking
- ITF = ITF entry
- JE = Junior exempt
- w/o = Walkover
- r = Retired
- d = Defaulted
- SR = Special ranking

=== Finals ===
Semifinals
(Italy) Lorenzo Giustino	6	3	4
8	(Colombia) Daniel Elahi Galán	3	6	6
(Spain) Sergio Gutiérrez Ferrol	1
2	(Spain) Carlos Taberner	2^{r}

Final
8	(Colombia) Daniel Elahi Galán	6	3	6
(Spain) Sergio Gutiérrez Ferrol	2	6	2

=== Top half ===
First round
1	(Serbia) N Milojević	6	7
(Belgium) A De Greef	4	5
(Italy) A Arnaboldi	6	6
Alt	(France) B Bonzi	4	3
(Argentina) F Argüello	4	6	0
(Bosnia and Herzegovina) T Brkić	6	1	6
(Italy) L Giustino	6	6
5	(Spain) R Ojeda Lara	3	0
3	(Italy) L Vanni	6	7^{7}
(Spain) Carlos Boluda-Purkiss	0	6^{5}
SE	(United States) U Blanch	3	4
WC	(Italy) J Berrettini	6	6
(France) J Tatlot	6	6^{6}	6
(Argentina) A Collarini	1	7^{8}	3
WC	(Brazil) T Bellucci	6	1	4
8	(Colombia) DE Galán	4	6	6

Second round
1	(Serbia) N Milojević	2	0^{r}
(Italy) A Arnaboldi	6	2
(Bosnia and Herzegovina) T Brkić	1	6^{4}
(Italy) L Giustino	6	7^{7}
3	(Italy) L Vanni	6	6
WC	(Italy) J Berrettini	4	3
(France) J Tatlot	3	4
8	(Colombia) DE Galán	6	6

Quarterfinals
(Italy) A Arnaboldi	3	4
(Italy) L Giustino	6	6
3	(Italy) L Vanni	3	6^{5}
8	(Colombia) DE Galán	6	7^{7}

Semifinals
(Italy) L Giustino	6	3	4
8	(Colombia) DE Galán	3	6	6

=== Bottom half ===
First round
7	(Italy) G Quinzi	6	6
Q	(Italy) A Vavassori	0	0
(Spain) S Gutiérrez Ferrol	6	3	6
(Italy) F Gaio	3	6	3
(Italy) M Viola	7^{7}	6
Q	(Italy) Pietro Rondoni	6^{5}	2
(Portugal) J Domingues	6	0	6
4	(Italy) S Caruso	4	6	4
6	(Spain) D Gimeno Traver	6	7
WC	(Italy) Riccardo Balzerani	3	5
WC	(Italy) A Pellegrino	3	4
(Croatia) A Pavić	6	6
Q	(Peru) JP Varillas	6	2
Q	(France) G Jacq	2	0^{r}
(Spain) T Robredo	2	1
2	(Spain) C Taberner	6	6

Second round
7	(Italy) G Quinzi	6	4	1
(Spain) S Gutiérrez Ferrol	1	6	6
(Italy) M Viola	2	6	6
(Portugal) J Domingues	6	3	3
6	(Spain) D Gimeno Traver	6	1	4
(Croatia) A Pavić	4	6	6
Q	(Peru) JP Varillas	3	3
2	(Spain) C Taberner	6	6

Quarterfinals
(Spain) S Gutiérrez Ferrol	6	6
(Italy) M Viola	1	0
(Croatia) A Pavić	4	4
2	(Spain) C Taberner	6	6

Semifinals
(Spain) S Gutiérrez Ferrol	1
2	(Spain) C Taberner	2^{r}
