= 2017 Tempe Challenger – Singles =

Singles
- 2017 Tempe Challenger

Final
- Champion: (United States) Tennys Sandgren
- Runner-up: (Serbia) Nikola Milojević
- Score: 4–6, 6–0, 6–3

Events
Singles	Doubles
- Tempe Challenger

This was the first edition of the tennis tournament.

Tennys Sandgren won the title after defeating Nikola Milojević 4–6, 6–0, 6–3 in the final.

== Seeds ==
1. (United States) Ernesto Escobedo (quarterfinals)
2. (United States) Stefan Kozlov (quarterfinals)
3. (Switzerland) Henri Laaksonen (first round, retired)
4. (Canada) Vasek Pospisil (withdrew)
5. (Argentina) Marco Trungelliti (quarterfinals)
6. (Russia) Teymuraz Gabashvili (semifinals)
7. (United States) Dennis Novikov (semifinals)
8. (El Salvador) Marcelo Arévalo (second round)

== Draw ==
Key

- Q = Qualifier
- WC = Wild card
- LL = Lucky loser
- Alt = Alternate
- ITF = ITF entry
- PR = Protected ranking
- SR = Special ranking
- SE = Special exempt
- JE = Junior exempt
- JR = Junior Accelerator Programme entrant
- CO = College Accelerator Programme entrant
- NG = Next Gen Accelerator Program entrant
- w/o = Walkover
- r = Retired
- d = Defaulted

=== Finals ===
Semifinals
7	(United States) Dennis Novikov	6	4	3
(United States) Tennys Sandgren	4	6	6
(Serbia) Nikola Milojević	7^{7}	6
6	(Russia) Teymuraz Gabashvili	6^{3}	4

Final
(United States) Tennys Sandgren	4	6	6
(Serbia) Nikola Milojević	6	0	3

=== Top half ===
First round
1	(United States) E Escobedo	6	6
(India) R Ramanathan	2	3
Alt	(Italy) S Caruso	7^{7}	7^{7}
Q	(Chile) N Jarry	6^{3}	6^{3}
WC	(Dominican Republic) R Cid Subervi	3	1
(Republic of Ireland) S Barry	6	6
(Ecuador) E Gómez	2	6	4
7	(United States) D Novikov	6	4	6
3	(Switzerland) H Laaksonen	1	1^{r}
(United States) M Mmoh	6	4
(Belgium) K Coppejans	6^{8}	4
(United States) T Sandgren	7^{10}	6
Q	(United Kingdom) L Bambridge	4	3
(United States) A Sarkissian	6	6
(Belgium) Y Mertens	7^{7}	4	3
5	(Argentina) M Trungelliti	6^{5}	6	6

Second round
1	(United States) E Escobedo	6	6
Alt	(Italy) S Caruso	1	4
(Republic of Ireland) S Barry	3	6^{9}
7	(United States) D Novikov	6	7^{11}
(United States) M Mmoh	4	0^{r}
(United States) T Sandgren	6	3
(United States) A Sarkissian	7	4	2
5	(Argentina) M Trungelliti	5	6	6

Quarterfinals
1	(United States) E Escobedo	4	7^{7}	4
7	(United States) D Novikov	6	6^{3}	6
(United States) T Sandgren	6	7
5	(Argentina) M Trungelliti	3	5

Semifinals
7	(United States) D Novikov	6	4	3
(United States) T Sandgren	4	6	6

=== Bottom half ===
First round
8	(El Salvador) M Arévalo	6	6
Q	(Canada) B Schnur	0	3
WC	(Denmark) B Hannestad	4	4
LL	(Dominican Republic) J Hernández-Fernández	6	6
(United States) S Bangoura	1	4
(Serbia) N Milojević	6	6
(United States) A Krajicek	2	7^{7}	3
Q	(Colombia) DE Galán	6	6^{4}	6
6	(Russia) T Gabashvili	6	6
WC	(Belgium) M Geerts	2	3
(Brazil) C Zampieri	1	6^{3}
(Japan) A Santillan	6	7^{7}
(Ecuador) R Quiroz	3	6	6
(United States) M McDonald	6	3	4
WC	(United States) B Klahn	1	5
2	(United States) S Kozlov	6	7

Second round
8	(El Salvador) M Arévalo	6^{5}	4
LL	(Dominican Republic) J Hernández-Fernández	7^{7}	6
(Serbia) N Milojević	7	6
Q	(Colombia) DE Galán	5	3
6	(Russia) T Gabashvili	6^{5}	7^{7}	6
(Japan) A Santillan	7^{7}	6^{2}	2
(Ecuador) R Quiroz	4	6^{5}
2	(United States) S Kozlov	6	7^{7}

Quarterfinals
LL	(Dominican Republic) J Hernández-Fernández	6	1	5
(Serbia) N Milojević	4	6	7
6	(Russia) T Gabashvili	6	6
2	(United States) S Kozlov	3	1

Semifinals
(Serbia) N Milojević	7^{7}	6
6	(Russia) T Gabashvili	6^{3}	4
