= 2019 Da Nang Tennis Open – Doubles =

Doubles
- 2019 Da Nang Tennis Open

Final
- Champions: (Chinese Taipei) Hsieh Cheng-peng (Indonesia) Christopher Rungkat
- Runners-up: (India) Leander Paes (Mexico) Miguel Ángel Reyes-Varela
- Score: 6–3, 2–6, [11–9]

Events
Singles	Doubles
Da Nang Tennis Open

This was the first edition of the tournament.

Hsieh Cheng-peng and Christopher Rungkat won the title after defeating Leander Paes and Miguel Ángel Reyes-Varela 6–3, 2–6, [11–9] in the final.

== Seeds ==
1. (India) Leander Paes / (Mexico) Miguel Ángel Reyes-Varela (final)
2. (Chinese Taipei) Hsieh Cheng-peng / (Indonesia) Christopher Rungkat (champions)
3. (Thailand) Sanchai Ratiwatana / (Thailand) Sonchat Ratiwatana (semifinals)
4. (Kazakhstan) Timur Khabibulin / (Chinese Taipei) Yang Tsung-hua (semifinals)

== Draw ==
Key

- Q = Qualifier
- WC = Wild card
- LL = Lucky loser
- Alt = Alternate
- ITF = ITF entry
- PR = Protected ranking
- SR = Special ranking
- SE = Special exempt
- JE = Junior exempt
- JR = Junior Accelerator Programme entrant
- CO = College Accelerator Programme entrant
- NG = Next Gen Accelerator Program entrant
- w/o = Walkover
- r = Retired
- d = Defaulted

First round
1	(India) L Paes (Mexico) MÁ Reyes-Varela	6	7
(India) S Balaji (India) A Kadhe	3	5
(France) A Escoffier (Japan) Y Takahashi	7	6
(Spain) G Granollers (United States) T-S Kwiatkowski	5	2
4	(Kazakhstan) T Khabibulin (Chinese Taipei) T-h Yang	6	6^{5}	[10]
(Russia) T Gabashvili (Kazakhstan) D Yevseyev	2	7^{7}	[8]
ITF	(France) C Denolly (France) A Müller	7^{8}	4	[8]
(Japan) T Matsui (Japan) K Uesugi	6^{6}	6	[10]
WC	(United States) D Nguyen (Vietnam) LG Trịnh	1	7^{7}	[6]
(Italy) A Bega (Italy) M Viola	6	6^{4}	[10]
(Germany) S Fanselow (United States) Evan Song
3	(Thailand) Sa Ratiwatana (Thailand) So Ratiwatana	w/o
WC	(Vietnam) QK Lê (Vietnam) NH Lý	6	5	[11]
WC	(United States) A Ayeni (Australia) Stefan Vujic	3	7	[13]
ITF	(Italy) R Bonadio (Spain) J Samper Montaña	6	4	[8]
2	(Chinese Taipei) C-p Hsieh (Indonesia) C Rungkat	4	6	[10]

Quarterfinals
1	(India) L Paes (Mexico) MÁ Reyes-Varela	6	6
(France) A Escoffier (Japan) Y Takahashi	3	1
4	(Kazakhstan) T Khabibulin (Chinese Taipei) T-h Yang	6	6
(Japan) T Matsui (Japan) K Uesugi	1	4
(Italy) A Bega (Italy) M Viola	6^{4}	1
3	(Thailand) Sa Ratiwatana (Thailand) So Ratiwatana	7^{7}	6
WC	(United States) A Ayeni (Australia) S Vujic	1	3
2	(Chinese Taipei) C-p Hsieh (Indonesia) C Rungkat	6	6

Semifinals
1	(India) L Paes (Mexico) MÁ Reyes-Varela	6^{3}	6	[10]
4	(Kazakhstan) T Khabibulin (Chinese Taipei) T-h Yang	7^{7}	3	[4]
3	(Thailand) Sa Ratiwatana (Thailand) So Ratiwatana	6	3	[5]
2	(Chinese Taipei) C-p Hsieh (Indonesia) C Rungkat	4	6	[10]

Final
1	(India) L Paes (Mexico) MÁ Reyes-Varela	3	6	[9]
2	(Chinese Taipei) C-p Hsieh (Indonesia) C Rungkat	6	2	[11]
