= 2019 Da Nang Tennis Open – Singles =

Singles
- 2019 Da Nang Tennis Open

Final
- Champion: (Spain) Marcel Granollers
- Runner-up: (Italy) Matteo Viola
- Score: 6–2, 6–0

Events
Singles	Doubles
Da Nang Tennis Open

This was the first edition of the tournament.

Marcel Granollers won the title after defeating Matteo Viola 6–2, 6–0 in the final.

== Seeds ==
All seeds receive a bye into the second round.

1. (Spain) Marcel Granollers (champion)
2. (Italy) Matteo Viola (final)
3. (India) Sasikumar Mukund (third round)
4. (United States) Thai-Son Kwiatkowski (semifinals)
5. (Chinese Taipei) Yang Tsung-hua (quarterfinals)
6. (United States) Evan Song (second round)
7. (Germany) Sebastian Fanselow (third round, retired)
8. (Japan) Yusuke Takahashi (second round)
9. (Japan) Renta Tokuda (second round)
10. (Hungary) Zsombor Piros (second round)
11. (India) Sumit Nagal (third round)
12. (France) Alexandre Müller (second round)
13. (Spain) Carlos Boluda-Purkiss (third round)
14. (France) Antoine Escoffier (second round)
15. (Japan) Makoto Ochi (second round)
16. (Kazakhstan) Denis Yevseyev (semifinals, retired)

== Draw ==
Key

- Q = Qualifier
- WC = Wild card
- LL = Lucky loser
- Alt = Alternate
- ITF = ITF entry
- PR = Protected ranking
- SR = Special ranking
- SE = Special exempt
- JE = Junior exempt
- JR = Junior Accelerator Programme entrant
- CO = College Accelerator Programme entrant
- NG = Next Gen Accelerator Program entrant
- w/o = Walkover
- r = Retired
- d = Defaulted

=== Finals ===
Quarterfinals
1	(Spain) Marcel Granollers	6^{4}	6	6
(Russia) Alen Avidzba	7^{7}	2	4
16	(Kazakhstan) Denis Yevseyev	6	6^{5}	6
(Spain) Gerard Granollers	4	7^{7}	3
5	(Chinese Taipei) Yang Tsung-hua	4	6^{7}
4	(United States) Thai-Son Kwiatkowski	6	7^{9}
(China) Bai Yan	3	6^{5}
2	(Italy) Matteo Viola	6	7^{7}

Semifinals
1	(Spain) Marcel Granollers	3
16	(Kazakhstan) Denis Yevseyev	0^{r}
4	(United States) Thai-Son Kwiatkowski	7	6^{5}	2
2	(Italy) Matteo Viola	5	7^{7}	6

Final
1	(Spain) Marcel Granollers	6	6
2	(Italy) Matteo Viola	2	0

=== Top half ===
==== Section 1 ====
First round
Q	(Japan) K Uesugi	3	4
(France) A Rinderknech	6	6
WC	(Thailand) So Ratiwatana	4	6^{6}
LL	(United States) A Ayeni	6	7^{8}
WC	(Australia) Stefan Vujic	4	2
ITF	(Italy) R Bonadio	6	6
WC	(Vietnam) LG Trịnh	3	4
(Russia) A Avidzba	6	6

Second round
1	(Spain) M Granollers	1	6	6
(France) A Rinderknech	6	4	4
LL	(United States) A Ayeni	1	7^{7}	0
13	(Spain) Carlos Boluda-Purkiss	6	6^{5}	6
12	(France) A Müller	2	7	6^{7}
ITF	(Italy) R Bonadio	6	5	7^{9}
(Russia) A Avidzba	6	6
8	(Japan) Y Takahashi	4	2

Third round
1	(Spain) M Granollers	6	6
13	(Spain) C Boluda-Purkiss	4	3
ITF	(Italy) R Bonadio	6^{2}	6	5
(Russia) A Avidzba	7^{7}	4	7

Quarterfinals
1	(Spain) M Granollers	6^{4}	6	6
(Russia) A Avidzba	7^{7}	2	4

==== Section 2 ====
First round
ITF	(Japan) Y Shimizu	4	4
WC	(Japan) S Hazawa	6	6
(Italy) A Bega	4	6	4
(India) A Kadhe	6	4	6
(Spain) G Granollers	6	6
Q	(India) Manish Sureshkumar	2	4
(Vietnam) NH Lý	7^{7}	4	7^{7}
(Germany) D Altmaier	6^{0}	6	6^{5}

Second round
3	(India) S Mukund	6	6
WC	(Japan) S Hazawa	1	4
(India) A Kadhe	2	1
16	(Kazakhstan) D Yevseyev	6	6
10	(Hungary) Z Piros	3	3
(Spain) G Granollers	6	6
(Vietnam) NH Lý	6	1	3
7	(Germany) S Fanselow	1	6	6

Third round
3	(India) S Mukund	4	2
16	(Kazakhstan) D Yevseyev	6	6
(Spain) G Granollers	4
7	(Germany) S Fanselow	1^{r}

Quarterfinals
16	(Kazakhstan) D Yevseyev	6	6^{5}	6
(Spain) G Granollers	4	7^{7}	3

=== Bottom half ===
==== Section 3 ====
First round
(Russia) T Gabashvili	2	4
WC	(United States) D Nguyen	6	6
(South Korea) J-s Nam	6^{1}	6^{3}
(India) S Balaji	7^{7}	7^{7}
(Norway) V Durasovic	6	6
(Japan) Shuichi Sekiguchi	3	2
ITF	(Spain) J Samper Montaña	3	3
(Egypt) Y Hossam	6	6

Second round
5	(Chinese Taipei) T-h Yang	6	6
WC	(United States) D Nguyen	3	4
(India) S Balaji	6^{0}	6^{6}
11	(India) S Nagal	7^{7}	7^{8}
14	(France) A Escoffier	6^{5}	5
(Norway) V Durasovic	7^{7}	7
(Egypt) Y Hossam	5	4
4	(United States) T-S Kwiatkowski	7	6

Third round
5	(Chinese Taipei) T-h Yang	2	6	6
11	(India) S Nagal	6	1	0
(Norway) V Durasovic	5	6^{4}
4	(United States) T-S Kwiatkowski	7	7^{7}

Quarterfinals
5	(Chinese Taipei) T-h Yang	4	6^{7}
4	(United States) T-S Kwiatkowski	6	7^{9}

==== Section 4 ====
First round
(Chinese Taipei) T-l Wu	5	3
(China) Y Bai	7	6
ITF	(South Korea) Kim Cheong-eui	6	6
(India) Sidharth Rawat	3	1
(Germany) B Hassan	6	1	6
(Germany) Jeremy Jahn	2	6	3
(Thailand) W Trongcharoenchaikul	1	6	6
(France) C Denolly	6	3	4

Second round
6	(United States) Evan Song	4	4
(China) Y Bai	6	6
ITF	(South Korea) C-e Kim	7	6
9	(Japan) Renta Tokuda	5	1
15	(Japan) Makoto Ochi	6	0	0
(Germany) B Hassan	3	6	6
(Thailand) W Trongcharoenchaikul	6	3	4
2	(Italy) M Viola	4	6	6

Third round
(China) Y Bai	6	3	6
ITF	(South Korea) C-e Kim	4	6	3
(Germany) B Hassan	4	1
2	(Italy) M Viola	6	6

Quarterfinals
(China) Y Bai	3	6^{5}
2	(Italy) M Viola	6	7^{7}
