= 2017 San Benedetto Tennis Cup – Doubles =

Doubles
- 2017 San Benedetto Tennis Cup

Final
- Champions: (Spain) Carlos Taberner (Spain) Pol Toledo Bagué
- Runners-up: (Romania) Adrian Ungur (Italy) Flavio Cipolla
- Score: 7–5, 6–4

Events
Singles	Doubles
- San Benedetto Tennis Cup

Federico Gaio and Stefano Napolitano were the defending champions but only Gaio chose to defend his title, partnering Salvatore Caruso. Gaio withdrew in the first round due to a Caruso injury.

Carlos Taberner and Pol Toledo Bagué won the title after defeating Adrian Ungur and Flavio Cipolla 7–5, 6–4 in the final.

== Seeds ==
1. (Switzerland) Luca Margaroli / (Austria) Tristan-Samuel Weissborn (semifinals)
2. (Australia) Steven de Waard / (Japan) Ben McLachlan (first round)
3. (Monaco) Romain Arneodo / (Italy) Riccardo Ghedin (quarterfinals)
4. (Ecuador) Gonzalo Escobar / (Netherlands) Mark Vervoort (first round, retired)

== Draw ==
Key

- Q = Qualifier
- WC = Wild card
- LL = Lucky loser
- Alt = Alternate
- ITF = ITF entry
- PR = Protected ranking
- SR = Special ranking
- SE = Special exempt
- JE = Junior exempt
- JR = Junior Accelerator Programme entrant
- CO = College Accelerator Programme entrant
- NG = Next Gen Accelerator Program entrant
- w/o = Walkover
- r = Retired
- d = Defaulted

First round
1	(Switzerland) L Margaroli (Austria) T-S Weissborn	w/o
(Italy) S Caruso (Italy) F Gaio
(Argentina) A Collarini (Argentina) F Coria	6	4	[8]
(Italy) S Travaglia (Italy) L Vanni	3	6	[10]
3	(Monaco) R Arneodo (Italy) R Ghedin	7^{7}	6
(Argentina) JP Paz (Italy) A Pellegrino	6^{0}	0
(Spain) C Taberner (Spain) P Toledo Bagué	3	7	[10]
(Serbia) D Petrović (Serbia) Ilija Vučić	6	5	[5]
(Italy) Daniele Capecchi (Italy) Jacopo Stefanini	6^{4}	6^{4}
(Italy) Pietro Licciardi (Italy) GM Moroni	7^{7}	7^{7}
(Hungary) G Borsos (Italy) L Giustino	6	4
4	(Ecuador) G Escobar (Netherlands) M Vervoort	3	1^{r}
(France) B Bonzi (France) M Janvier	6	2
(Spain) R Carballés Baena (Dominican Republic) J Hernández-Fernández	1	1^{r}
(Italy) F Cipolla (Romania) A Ungur	6	6
2	(Australia) S de Waard (Japan) B McLachlan	4	4

Quarterfinals
1	(Switzerland) L Margaroli (Austria) T-S Weissborn	7	6
(Italy) S Travaglia (Italy) L Vanni	5	4
3	(Monaco) R Arneodo (Italy) R Ghedin	3	2
(Spain) C Taberner (Spain) P Toledo Bagué	6	6
(Italy) P Licciardi (Italy) GM Moroni	6	6
(Hungary) G Borsos (Italy) L Giustino	1	4
(France) B Bonzi (France) M Janvier	4	6	[4]
(Italy) F Cipolla (Romania) A Ungur	6	4	[10]

Semifinals
1	(Switzerland) L Margaroli (Austria) T-S Weissborn	1	3
(Spain) C Taberner (Spain) P Toledo Bagué	6	6
(Italy) P Licciardi (Italy) GM Moroni	1	3
(Italy) F Cipolla (Romania) A Ungur	6	6

Final
(Spain) C Taberner (Spain) P Toledo Bagué	7	6
(Romania) A Ungur (Italy) F Cipolla	5	4
