= 2016 San Benedetto Tennis Cup – Doubles =

Doubles
- 2016 San Benedetto Tennis Cup

Final
- Champions: (Italy) Federico Gaio; (Italy) Stefano Napolitano
- Runners-up: (Argentina) Facundo Argüello; (Peru) Sergio Galdós
- Score: 6–3, 6–4

Events
Singles	Doubles
← 2015 ·	San Benedetto Tennis Cup	· 2017 →

Dino Marcan and Antonio Šančić were the defending champions, but only Marcan defend his title partnering Kevin Krawietz. Marcan lost in the quarterfinals to Federico Gaio and Stefano Napolitano.

Gaio and Napolitano won the title after defeating Facundo Argüello and Sergio Galdós 6–3, 6–4 in the final.

== Seeds ==
1. (Argentina) Facundo Argüello / (Peru) Sergio Galdós (final)
2. (Germany) Kevin Krawietz / (Croatia) Dino Marcan (quarterfinals)
3. (Italy) Riccardo Ghedin / (Italy) Alessandro Motti (semifinals)
4. (Spain) Adrián Menéndez Maceiras / (Brazil) Fabrício Neis (semifinals)

== Draw ==
=== Key ===
- Q = Qualifier
- WC = Wild card
- LL = Lucky loser
- Alt = Alternate
- SE = Special exempt
- PR = Protected ranking
- ITF = ITF entry
- JE = Junior exempt
- w/o = Walkover
- r = Retired
- d = Defaulted
- SR = Special ranking

First round

Quarterfinals

Semifinals

Final

1
- (Argentina) F Argüello
- (Peru) S Galdós
7
7

WC
- (Italy) A Basso
- (Italy) R Bonadio
5
5

1
- (Argentina) F Argüello
- (Peru) S Galdós
6
7^{7}

- (Serbia) M Janković
- (Kazakhstan) D Popko
5
4

- (Belgium) S Gillé
- (Belgium) J Vliegen
4
6^{4}

- (Belgium) S Gillé
- (Belgium) J Vliegen
7
6

1
- (Argentina) F Argüello
- (Peru) S Galdós
6
7^{7}

3
- (Italy) R Ghedin
- (Italy) A Motti
4
7
[10]

3
- (Italy) R Ghedin
- (Italy) A Motti
4
6^{3}

- (Russia) Alexander Igoshin
- (Argentina) T Lipovšek Puches
6
5
[6]

3
- (Italy) R Ghedin
- (Italy) A Motti
1
6
[12]

(Netherlands) M Vervoort
(Serbia) Ilija Vučić
6
6

(Netherlands) M Vervoort
(Serbia) I Vučić
6
2
[10]

- (France) C Lestienne
- (Russia) I Nedelko
1
4

1
- (Argentina) F Argüello
- (Peru) S Galdós
3
4

- (Spain) E López Pérez
- (Slovenia) B Rola
7
6

WC
- (Italy) F Gaio
- (Italy) S Napolitano
6
6

- (Australia) S de Waard
- (Switzerland) L Margaroli
5
4

- (Spain) E López Pérez
- (Slovenia) B Rola
6
2
[4]

WC
- (Austria) L Miedler
- (Italy) S Travaglia
4
6
[10]

4
- (Spain) A Menéndez Maceiras
- (Brazil) F Neis
3
6
[10]

4
- (Spain) A Menéndez Maceiras
- (Brazil) F Neis
6
3
[12]

4
- (Spain) A Menéndez Maceiras
- (Brazil) F Neis
4
3

- (Belgium) A De Greef
- (Belgium) Y Reuter
0
2

WC
- (Italy) F Gaio
- (Italy) S Napolitano
6
6

WC
- (Italy) F Gaio
- (Italy) S Napolitano
6
6

WC
- (Italy) F Gaio
- (Italy) S Napolitano
3
6
[11]

- (Italy) S Caruso
- (Italy) A Giannessi
3
1

2
- (Germany) K Krawietz
- (Croatia) D Marcan
6
3
[9]

2
- (Germany) K Krawietz
- (Croatia) D Marcan
6
6
