= 2018 San Benedetto Tennis Cup =

- Date: 16 – 22 July
- Edition: 14th
- Category: ATP Challenger Tour
- Surface: Clay
- Location: San Benedetto del Tronto, Italy

Champions

Singles
- (Colombia) Daniel Elahi Galán

Doubles
- (Italy) Julian Ocleppo / (Italy) Andrea Vavassori
← 2017 ·	San Benedetto Tennis Cup	· 2019 →

The 2018 San Benedetto Tennis Cup was a professional tennis tournaments played on clay courts. It was the 14th edition of the tournament which was part of the 2018 ATP Challenger Tour. The event took place in San Benedetto del Tronto, Italy, from 16 to 22 July 2018.

== Singles entrants ==
=== Seeds ===
Country	Player	Rank^{1}	Seed
SRB	Nikola Milojević	162	1
ESP	Carlos Taberner	185	2
ITA	Luca Vanni	186	3
ITA	Salvatore Caruso	191	4
ESP	Ricardo Ojeda Lara	196	5
ESP	Daniel Gimeno Traver	197	6
ITA	Gianluigi Quinzi	200	7
COL	Daniel Elahi Galán	219	8

- ^{1} Rankings as of 2 July 2018.

=== Other entrants ===
The following players received wildcards into the singles main draw:

- (Italy) Riccardo Balzerani
- (Brazil) Thomaz Bellucci
- (Italy) Jacopo Berrettini
- (Italy) Andrea Pellegrino

The following player received entry into the singles main draw as a special exempt:

- (United States) Ulises Blanch

The following player received entry into the singles main draw as an alternate:

- (France) Benjamin Bonzi

The following players received entry from the qualifying draw:

- (France) Grégoire Jacq
- (Italy) Pietro Rondoni
- (Peru) Juan Pablo Varillas
- (Italy) Andrea Vavassori

== Champions ==
=== Singles ===
- (Colombia) Daniel Elahi Galán def. (Spain) Sergio Gutiérrez Ferrol 6–2, 3–6, 6–2.

=== Doubles ===
- (Italy) Julian Ocleppo / (Italy) Andrea Vavassori def. (Peru) Sergio Galdós / (Bolivia) Federico Zeballos 6–3, 6–2.
