= 2019 Da Nang Tennis Open =

- Date: 6–12 January
- Edition: 1st
- Draw: 48S / 16D
- Surface: Hard
- Location: Da Nang, Vietnam

Champions

Singles
- (Spain) Marcel Granollers

Doubles
- (Chinese Taipei) Hsieh Cheng-peng / (Indonesia) Christopher Rungkat
Da Nang Tennis Open

The 2019 Da Nang Tennis Open was a professional tennis tournament played on hardcourts. It was the first edition of the tournament which was part of the 2019 ATP Challenger Tour. It took place in Da Nang, Vietnam between 6 and 12 January 2019.

== Singles main draw entrants ==
=== Seeds ===
Country	Player	Rank^{1}	Seed
ESP	Marcel Granollers	96	1
ITA	Matteo Viola	291	2
IND	Sasikumar Mukund	295	3
USA	Thai-Son Kwiatkowski	296	4
TPE	Yang Tsung-hua	298	5
USA	Evan Song	320	6
GER	Sebastian Fanselow	323	7
JPN	Yusuke Takahashi	326	8
JPN	Renta Tokuda	337	9
HUN	Zsombor Piros	338	10
IND	Sumit Nagal	339	11
FRA	Alexandre Müller	342	12
ESP	Carlos Boluda-Purkiss	353	13
FRA	Antoine Escoffier	355	14
JPN	Makoto Ochi	358	15
KAZ	Denis Yevseyev	359	16

- ^{1} Rankings are as of December 31, 2018.

=== Other entrants ===
The following players received entry into the singles main draw as wildcards:

- (Japan) Shinji Hazawa
- (United States) Daniel Nguyen
- (Thailand) Sonchat Ratiwatana
- (Vietnam) Trịnh Linh Giang
- (Australia) Stefan Vujic

The following players received entry into the singles main draw using their ITF World Tennis Ranking:

- (Italy) Riccardo Bonadio
- (South Korea) Kim Cheong-eui
- (Spain) Jordi Samper Montaña
- (Japan) Yuta Shimizu

The following players received entry from the qualifying draw:

- (India) Manish Sureshkumar
- (Japan) Kaito Uesugi

The following player received entry as a lucky loser:

- (United States) Alafia Ayeni

== Champions ==
=== Singles ===
- (Spain) Marcel Granollers def. (Italy) Matteo Viola 6–2, 6–0.

=== Doubles ===
- (Chinese Taipei) Hsieh Cheng-peng / (Indonesia) Christopher Rungkat def. (India) Leander Paes / (Mexico) Miguel Ángel Reyes-Varela 6–3, 2–6, [11–9].
