= 2019 San Benedetto Tennis Cup =

- Date: 15 – 21 July
- Edition: 15th
- Category: ATP Challenger Tour
- Surface: Clay
- Location: San Benedetto del Tronto, Italy

Champions

Singles
- (Argentina) Renzo Olivo

Doubles
- (Croatia) Ivan Sabanov / (Croatia) Matej Sabanov
← 2018 ·	San Benedetto Tennis Cup	· 2022 →

The 2019 San Benedetto Tennis Cup was a professional tennis tournaments played on clay courts. It was the 15th edition of the tournament which was part of the 2019 ATP Challenger Tour. The event took place in San Benedetto del Tronto, Italy, from 15 to 21 July 2019.

== Singles entrants ==
=== Seeds ===
Country	Player	Rank^{1}	Seed
SVK	Andrej Martin	120	1
ITA	Gianluca Mager	142	2
ITA	Alessandro Giannessi	160	3
ITA	Federico Gaio	174	4
ARG	Federico Coria	176	5
ECU	Emilio Gómez	184	6
ITA	Roberto Marcora	215	7
ITA	Andrea Arnaboldi	219	8
ITA	Luca Vanni	225	9
BRA	Rogério Dutra Silva	233	10
COL	Santiago Giraldo	240	11
SRB	Peđa Krstin	247	12
ITA	Gianluigi Quinzi	262	13
DOM	José Hernández-Fernández	273	14
TPE	Wu Tung-lin	284	15
FRA	Alexandre Müller	287	16

- ^{1} Rankings as of 1 July 2019.

=== Other entrants ===
The following players received wildcards into the singles main draw:

- (Italy) Riccardo Balzerani
- (Italy) Francesco Forti
- (Italy) Lorenzo Musetti
- (Italy) Gianluigi Quinzi
- (Italy) Samuele Ramazzotti

The following player received entry into the singles main draw using a protected ranking:

- (Spain) Íñigo Cervantes

The following player received entry into the singles main draw as an alternate:

- (Italy) Giulio Zeppieri

The following players received entry into the singles main draw using their ITF World Tennis Ranking:

- (Italy) Riccardo Bonadio
- (Russia) Ivan Nedelko
- (Australia) Christopher O'Connell
- (Italy) Pietro Rondoni
- (Belgium) Jeroen Vanneste

The following players received entry from the qualifying draw:

- (Italy) Andrea Basso
- (Colombia) Daniel Elahi Galán

The following player received entry as a lucky loser:

- (Italy) Walter Trusendi

== Champions ==
=== Singles ===
- (Argentina) Renzo Olivo def. (Italy) Alessandro Giannessi 5–7, 7–6^{(7–4)}, 6–4.

=== Doubles ===
- (Croatia) Ivan Sabanov / (Croatia) Matej Sabanov def. (Peru) Sergio Galdós / (Peru) Juan Pablo Varillas 6–4, 4–6, [10–5].
