= 2016 Torneo de Mendoza – Singles =

Singles
- 2016 Torneo de Mendoza

Final
- Champion: (Austria) Gerald Melzer
- Runner-up: (France) Axel Michon
- Score: 4–6, 6–4, 6–0

Events
| Singles | Doubles |
- Torneo de Mendoza

Gerald Melzer won his 2nd career ATP Challenger Tour title, beating Axel Michon 4–6, 6–4, 6–0.

== Seeds ==
1. (Argentina) Horacio Zeballos (first round)
2. (Brazil) Rogério Dutra Silva (first round)
3. (Spain) Roberto Carballés Baena (semifinals)
4. (Argentina) Facundo Argüello (first round)
5. (Argentina) Facundo Bagnis (semifinals)
6. (Slovakia) Andrej Martin (first round)
7. (Argentina) Máximo González (first round)
8. (Austria) Gerald Melzer (champion)

== Draw ==
Key

- Q = Qualifier
- WC = Wild card
- LL = Lucky loser
- Alt = Alternate
- ITF = ITF entry
- PR = Protected ranking
- SR = Special ranking
- SE = Special exempt
- JE = Junior exempt
- JR = Junior Accelerator Programme entrant
- CO = College Accelerator Programme entrant
- NG = Next Gen Accelerator Program entrant
- w/o = Walkover
- r = Retired
- d = Defaulted

=== Finals ===
Semifinals
5 | (Argentina) Facundo Bagnis | 1 | 3
(France) Axel Michon | 6 | 6
3 | (Spain) Roberto Carballés Baena | 6 | 2 | 3
8 | (Austria) Gerald Melzer | 4 | 6 | 6

Final
(France) Axel Michon | 6 | 4 | 0
8 | (Austria) Gerald Melzer | 4 | 6 | 6

=== Top half ===
First round
1 | (Argentina) H Zeballos | 6^{6} | 5
Q | (Argentina) Maximiliano Estévez | 7^{8} | 7
Q | (Germany) P Torebko | 7^{7} | 6^{4} | 7
(France) M Hamou | 6^{4} | 7^{7} | 5
(Ecuador) E Gómez | 2 | 1
(Brazil) G Clezar | 6 | 6
Q | (Argentina) Juan Ignacio Galarza | 3 | 6^{5}
5 | (Argentina) F Bagnis | 6 | 7^{7}
4 | (Argentina) F Argüello | 0 | 7 | 4
WC | (Argentina) JP Paz | 6 | 5 | 6
(France) A Michon | 3 | 6 | 7^{7}
(United States) S Bangoura | 6 | 3 | 6^{5}
(Spain) E López Pérez | 6 | 3 | 6
WC | (Italy) Francisco Bahamonde | 1 | 6 | 3
WC | (Argentina) A Collarini | 4 | 6 | 6
7 | (Argentina) M González | 6 | 0 | 4

Second round
Q | (Argentina) M Estevez | 7^{8} | 6
Q | (Germany) P Torebko | 6^{6} | 3
(Brazil) G Clezar | 6 | 4 | 4
5 | (Argentina) F Bagnis | 3 | 6 | 6
WC | (Argentina) JP Paz | 2 | 7^{7} | 4
(France) A Michon | 6 | 6^{2} | 6
(Spain) E López Pérez | 7 | 4 | 7^{9}
WC | (Argentina) A Collarini | 5 | 6 | 6^{7}

Quarterfinals
Q | (Argentina) M Estevez | 5 | 5
5 | (Argentina) F Bagnis | 7 | 7
(France) A Michon | 6 | 3 | 6
(Spain) E López Pérez | 3 | 6 | 1

Semifinals
5 | (Argentina) F Bagnis | 1 | 3
(France) A Michon | 6 | 6

=== Bottom half ===
First round
6 | (Slovakia) A Martin | 4 | 3
(Argentina) Patricio Heras | 6 | 6
(Argentina) G Andreozzi | 6 | 6
(Chile) N Jarry | 3 | 4
WC | (France) G Mina | 6^{4} | 7 | 6
(Dominican Republic) J Hernández | 7^{7} | 5 | 2
(Argentina) F Coria | 4 | 6 | 3
3 | (Spain) R Carballés Baena | 6 | 3 | 6
8 | (Austria) G Melzer | 6 | 7^{7}
(Argentina) N Kicker | 4 | 6^{4}
(Argentina) H Casanova | 3 | 6 | 6
(Argentina) T Lipovšek Puches | 6 | 4 | 3
(France) J Eysseric | 6 | 6^{4} | 6
(Ecuador) G Escobar | 2 | 7^{7} | 3
Q | (Brazil) T Monteiro | 3 | 6 | 6
2 | (Brazil) R Dutra Silva | 6 | 3 | 4

Second round
(Argentina) P Heras | 2 | 3
(Argentina) G Andreozzi | 6 | 6
WC | (France) G Mina | 4 | 4
3 | (Spain) R Carballés Baena | 6 | 6
8 | (Austria) G Melzer | 6 | 6
(Argentina) H Casanova | 3 | 2
(France) J Eysseric | 6 | 4 | 5
Q | (Brazil) T Monteiro | 4 | 6 | 7

Quarterfinals
(Argentina) G Andreozzi | 2 | 6^{8}
3 | (Spain) R Carballés Baena | 6 | 7^{10}
8 | (Austria) G Melzer | 6 | 6
Q | (Brazil) T Monteiro | 2 | 4

Semifinals
3 | (Spain) R Carballés Baena | 6 | 2 | 3
8 | (Austria) G Melzer | 4 | 6 | 6
