= 2015 San Benedetto Tennis Cup – Doubles =

Doubles
- 2015 San Benedetto Tennis Cup

Final
- Champion: (Croatia) Dino Marcan (Croatia) Antonio Šančić
- Runner-up: (Mexico) César Ramírez (Mexico) Miguel Ángel Reyes-Varela
- Score: 6–3, 6–7^{(10–12)}, [12–10]

Events
Singles	Doubles
← 2014 ·	San Benedetto Tennis Cup	· 2016 →

Daniele Giorgini and Potito Starace are the defending champions, but they decided not to participate this year.

Dino Marcan and Antonio Šančić won the title, defeating César Ramírez and Miguel Ángel Reyes-Varela in the final 6–3, 6–7^{10–12}, [12–10].

== Seeds ==
1. (Mexico) César Ramírez / (Mexico) Miguel Ángel Reyes-Varela (final)
2. (Croatia) Dino Marcan / (Croatia) Antonio Šančić (champions)
3. (Italy) Flavio Cipolla / (Italy) Alessandro Motti (semifinals)
4. (United States) James Cerretani / (Romania) Costin Pavăl (semifinals)

== Draw ==
=== Key ===
- Q = Qualifier
- WC = Wild card
- LL = Lucky loser
- Alt = Alternate
- SE = Special exempt
- PR = Protected ranking
- ITF = ITF entry
- JE = Junior exempt
- w/o = Walkover
- r = Retired
- d = Defaulted
- SR = Special ranking

=== Draw ===
First round
1	(Mexico) C Ramírez (Mexico) MA Reyes-Varela	6	6
(Bosnia and Herzegovina) D Džumhur (Netherlands) S Groen	4	0
(Croatia) T Androić (Italy) Matteo Marfia	3	2
(Italy) M Cecchinato (Italy) F Gaio	6	6
3	(Italy) F Cipolla (Italy) A Motti	7	6
(Egypt) M Safwat (India) D Sharan	5	2
WC	(United States) C Altamirano (United States) T-S Kwiatkowski	6	6
(Romania) Alexandru-Daniel Carpen (Italy) R Ghedin	2	2
WC	(Italy) S Caruso (Italy) G Naso	6	6
(Italy) R Marcora (Italy) M Viola	2	2
(Italy) A Giannessi (Spain) A Ramos-Viñolas	2	4
4	(United States) J Cerretani (Romania) C Pavăl	6	6
(Italy) Enrico Becuzzi (Italy) P Lorenzi	0	0
(Croatia) N Mektić (Croatia) A Veić	6	6
WC	(Italy) Edoardo Eremin (Italy) S Napolitano	4	6^{9}
2	(Croatia) D Marcan (Croatia) A Šančić	6	7^{11}

Quarterfinals
1	(Mexico) C Ramírez (Mexico) MA Reyes-Varela	6	6
(Italy) M Cecchinato (Italy) F Gaio	4	2
3	(Italy) F Cipolla (Italy) A Motti	3	6	[10]
WC	(United States) C Altamirano (United States) T-S Kwiatkowski	6	2	[4]
WC	(Italy) S Caruso (Italy) G Naso	2	4
4	(United States) J Cerretani (Romania) C Pavăl	6	6
(Croatia) N Mektić (Croatia) A Veić	4	5
2	(Croatia) D Marcan (Croatia) A Šančić	6	7

Semifinals
1	(Mexico) C Ramírez (Mexico) MA Reyes-Varela	7^{7}	6
3	(Italy) F Cipolla (Italy) A Motti	6^{2}	3
4	(United States) J Cerretani (Romania) C Pavăl	6	3	[4]
2	(Croatia) D Marcan (Croatia) A Šančić	4	6	[10]

Final
1	(Mexico) C Ramírez (Mexico) MA Reyes-Varela	3	7^{12}	[10]
2	(Croatia) D Marcan (Croatia) A Šančić	6	6^{10}	[12]
