= 2017 Tempe Challenger – Doubles =

Doubles
- 2017 Tempe Challenger

Final
- Champions: (Italy) Walter Trusendi (Italy) Matteo Viola
- Runners-up: (El Salvador) Marcelo Arévalo (Dominican Republic) José Hernández-Fernández
- Score: 5–7, 6–2, [12–10]

Events
Singles	Doubles
- Tempe Challenger

This was the first edition of the tournament.

Walter Trusendi and Matteo Viola won the title after defeating Marcelo Arévalo and José Hernández-Fernández 5–7, 6–2, [12–10] in the final.

== Seeds ==
1. (Ukraine) Denys Molchanov / (United States) Dennis Novikov (semifinals)
2. (United States) Austin Krajicek / (United States) Jackson Withrow (semifinals)
3. (Russia) Teymuraz Gabashvili / (Australia) Matt Reid (quarterfinals)
4. (Venezuela) Luis David Martínez / (Brazil) Caio Zampieri (quarterfinals)

== Draw ==
Key

- Q = Qualifier
- WC = Wild card
- LL = Lucky loser
- Alt = Alternate
- ITF = ITF entry
- PR = Protected ranking
- SR = Special ranking
- SE = Special exempt
- JE = Junior exempt
- JR = Junior Accelerator Programme entrant
- CO = College Accelerator Programme entrant
- NG = Next Gen Accelerator Program entrant
- w/o = Walkover
- r = Retired
- d = Defaulted

First round
1	(Ukraine) D Molchanov (United States) D Novikov	6	6
(Serbia) N Milojević (India) R Ramanathan	1	4
(Belgium) K Coppejans (Japan) A Santillan	3	4
(United Kingdom) L Bambridge (United States) M McDonald	6	6
3	(Russia) T Gabashvili (Australia) M Reid	6	6
(United States) S Bangoura (United States) A Lawson	4	2
WC	(Republic of Ireland) S Barry (Belgium) Y Mertens	1	3
(El Salvador) M Arévalo (Dominican Republic) J Hernández-Fernández	6	6
(United States) S Kozlov (United States) A Reed	6^{2}	2
Q	(Italy) W Trusendi (Italy) M Viola	7^{7}	6
WC	(Belgium) M Geerts (Denmark) B Hannestad	6^{6}	2
4	(Venezuela) LD Martínez (Brazil) C Zampieri	7^{8}	6
WC	(France) Mandresy Rakotomalala (United Kingdom) Thomas Wright	3	2
PR	(United States) B Klahn (United States) T Sandgren	6	6
(Ecuador) E Gómez (Chile) N Jarry	7	5	[5]
2	(United States) A Krajicek (United States) J Withrow	5	7	[10]

Quarterfinals
1	(Ukraine) D Molchanov (United States) D Novikov	6	7^{8}
(United Kingdom) L Bambridge (United States) M McDonald	4	6^{6}
3	(Russia) T Gabashvili (Australia) M Reid	6	5	[7]
(El Salvador) M Arévalo (Dominican Republic) J Hernández-Fernández	1	7	[10]
Q	(Italy) W Trusendi (Italy) M Viola	6	7^{7}
4	(Venezuela) LD Martínez (Brazil) C Zampieri	3	6^{4}
PR	(United States) B Klahn (United States) T Sandgren	3	6	[15]
2	(United States) A Krajicek (United States) J Withrow	6	3	[17]

Semifinals
1	(Ukraine) D Molchanov (United States) D Novikov	6	3	[10]
(El Salvador) M Arévalo (Dominican Republic) J Hernández-Fernández	2	6	[12]
Q	(Italy) W Trusendi (Italy) M Viola	3	6	[10]
2	(United States) A Krajicek (United States) J Withrow	6	3	[8]

Final
(El Salvador) M Arévalo (Dominican Republic) J Hernández-Fernández	7	2	[10]
Q	(Italy) W Trusendi (Italy) M Viola	5	6	[12]
