= 2016 San Benedetto Tennis Cup =

- Date: 9 – 17 July
- Edition: 12th
- Category: ATP Challenger Tour
- Prize money: €42,500+H
- Surface: Clay
- Location: San Benedetto del Tronto, Italy

Champions

Singles
- (Italy) Federico Gaio

Doubles
- (Italy) Federico Gaio / (Italy) Stefano Napolitano
← 2015 ·	San Benedetto Tennis Cup	· 2017 →

The 2016 San Benedetto Tennis Cup is a professional tennis tournaments played on clay courts. It is the 12th edition of the tournament which is part of the 2016 ATP Challenger Tour, offering a total of €42,500+H in prize money. The event takes place in San Benedetto del Tronto, Italy, from 9 to 17 July 2016.

== Singles entrants ==
=== Seeds ===
Country	Player	Rank^{1}	Seed
ITA	Alessandro Giannessi	164	1
ITA	Luca Vanni	171	2
ARG	Facundo Argüello	175	3
SLO	Blaž Rola	181	4
BEL	Arthur De Greef	182	5
FRA	Mathias Bourgue	184	6
ITA	Matteo Donati	191	7
FRA	Grégoire Barrère	192	8

- ^{1} Rankings as of 27 June 2016.

=== Other entrants ===
The following players received wildcards into the singles main draw:

- (Italy) Gianluca Mager
- (Italy) Andrea Basso
- (Italy) Gianluigi Quinzi
- (Italy) Edoardo Eremin

The following player gained entry into the singles main draw as a special exempt:

- (Italy) Stefano Napolitano

The following players received entry from the qualifying draw:

- (Austria) Michael Linzer
- (Serbia) Laslo Đere
- (Argentina) Patricio Heras
- (Germany) Kevin Krawietz

The following player entered as a lucky loser:

- (Argentina) Hernán Casanova

== Doubles main draw entrants ==
=== Seeds ===
Country	Player	Country	Player	Rank^{1}	Seed
ARG	Facundo Argüello	PER	Sergio Galdós	270	1
GER	Kevin Krawietz	CRO	Dino Marcan	307	2
ITA	Riccardo Ghedin	ITA	Alessandro Motti	329	3
ESP	Adrián Menéndez-Maceiras	BRA	Fabrício Neis	375	4

- ^{1} Rankings as of 27 June 2016.

=== Other entrants ===
The following pairs received wildcards into the doubles main draw:

- (Italy) Andrea Basso / (Italy) Riccardo Bonadio
- (Austria) Lucas Miedler / (Italy) Stefano Travaglia
- (Italy) Federico Gaio / (Italy) Stefano Napolitano

== Champions ==
=== Singles ===
- (Italy) Federico Gaio def. (France) Constant Lestienne, 6–2, 1–6, 6–3.

=== Doubles ===
- (Italy) Federico Gaio / (Italy) Stefano Napolitano def. (Argentina) Facundo Argüello / (Peru) Sergio Galdós, 6–3, 6–4.
