= 2016 San Benedetto Tennis Cup – Singles =

Singles
- 2016 San Benedetto Tennis Cup

Final
- Champion: (Italy) Federico Gaio
- Runner-up: (France) Constant Lestienne
- Score: 6–2, 1–6, 6–3

Events
Singles	Doubles
← 2015 ·	San Benedetto Tennis Cup	· 2017 →

Albert Ramos Viñolas was the defending champion but chose not to participate.

Federico Gaio won the title after defeating Constant Lestienne 6–2, 1–6, 6–3 in the final.

== Seeds ==
1. (Italy) Alessandro Giannessi (second round, retired)
2. (Italy) Luca Vanni (first round)
3. (Argentina) Facundo Argüello (first round)
4. (Slovenia) Blaž Rola (second round)
5. (Belgium) Arthur De Greef (semifinals)
6. (France) Mathias Bourgue (first round)
7. (Italy) Matteo Donati (first round)
8. (France) Grégoire Barrère (first round)

== Draw ==
=== Key ===
- Q = Qualifier
- WC = Wild card
- LL = Lucky loser
- Alt = Alternate
- SE = Special exempt
- PR = Protected ranking
- ITF = ITF entry
- JE = Junior exempt
- w/o = Walkover
- r = Retired
- d = Defaulted
- SR = Special ranking

=== Finals ===
Semifinals
(Italy) Federico Gaio	7	1	6
5	(Belgium) Arthur De Greef	5	6	2
(France) Constant Lestienne	6	4	6
Q	(Germany) Kevin Krawietz	1	6	1

Final
(Italy) Federico Gaio	6	1	6
(France) Constant Lestienne	2	6	3

=== Top half ===
First round
1	(Italy) A Giannessi	7^{13}	2	6
(Argentina) T Lipovšek Puches	6^{11}	6	3
(Serbia) M Janković	4	6^{3}
(Italy) F Gaio	6	7^{7}
(Spain) E López Pérez	7^{7}	6
(Russia) A Vatutin	6^{0}	4
WC	(Italy) G Mager	6	5	6
6	(France) M Bourgue	4	7	1
4	(Slovenia) B Rola	7	6
Q	(Austria) M Linzer	5	0
SE	(Italy) S Napolitano	7^{8}	6
(Spain) A Menéndez Maceiras	6^{6}	2
(Belgium) Y Reuter	6	5	0^{r}
(Kazakhstan) D Popko	2	7	2
WC	(Italy) A Basso	6	4	4
5	(Belgium) A De Greef	4	6	6

Second round
1	(Italy) A Giannessi	6	3^{r}
(Italy) F Gaio	4	4
(Spain) E López Pérez	5	7^{7}	6^{2}
WC	(Italy) G Mager	7	6^{3}	7^{7}
4	(Slovenia) B Rola	4	3
SE	(Italy) S Napolitano	6	6
(Kazakhstan) D Popko	6	2	4
5	(Belgium) A De Greef	4	6	6

Quarterfinals
(Italy) F Gaio	6	6
WC	(Italy) G Mager	4	3
SE	(Italy) S Napolitano	7	2	1
5	(Belgium) A De Greef	5	6	6

Semifinals
(Italy) F Gaio	7	1	6
5	(Belgium) A De Greef	5	6	2

=== Bottom half ===
First round
7	(Italy) M Donati	4	3
(France) C Lestienne	6	6
(Germany) N Langer	3	6	2
(Russia) I Nedelko	6	1	6
WC	(Italy) G Quinzi	4	6	6
LL	(Argentina) H Casanova	6	2	3
(Italy) S Caruso	6	6
3	(Argentina) F Argüello	2	3
8	(France) G Barrère	3	2
WC	(Italy) Edoardo Eremin	6	6
(Germany) A Beck	7	5	4
Q	(Serbia) L Đere	5	7	6
(France) M Chazal	6^{5}	6^{2}
Q	(Argentina) Patricio Heras	7^{7}	7^{7}
Q	(Germany) K Krawietz	6	7^{7}
2	(Italy) L Vanni	4	6^{0}

Second round
(France) C Lestienne	6^{1}	7	6
(Russia) I Nedelko	7^{7}	5	3
WC	(Italy) G Quinzi	6	6
(Italy) S Caruso	3	2
WC	(Italy) E Eremin	6^{5}	7^{7}	3
Q	(Serbia) L Đere	7^{7}	6^{4}	6
Q	(Argentina) P Heras	6^{4}	4
Q	(Germany) K Krawietz	7^{7}	6

Quarterfinals
(France) C Lestienne	7^{7}	6
WC	(Italy) G Quinzi	6^{4}	4
Q	(Serbia) L Đere	6	3	6^{7}
Q	(Germany) K Krawietz	2	6	7^{9}

Semifinals
(France) C Lestienne	6	4	6
Q	(Germany) K Krawietz	1	6	1
