= 2019 San Benedetto Tennis Cup – Singles =

Singles
- 2019 San Benedetto Tennis Cup

Final
- Champion: (Argentina) Renzo Olivo
- Runner-up: (Italy) Alessandro Giannessi
- Score: 5–7, 7–6^{(7–4)}, 6–4

Events
Singles	Doubles
← 2018 ·	San Benedetto Tennis Cup	· 2022 →

Daniel Elahi Galán was the defending champion but lost in the second round to Rogério Dutra Silva.

Renzo Olivo won the title after defeating Alessandro Giannessi 5–7, 7–6^{(7–4)}, 6–4 in the final.

== Seeds ==
All seeds receive a bye into the second round.

1. (Slovakia) Andrej Martin (semifinals)
2. (Italy) Gianluca Mager (second round)
3. (Italy) Alessandro Giannessi (final)
4. (Italy) Federico Gaio (semifinals)
5. (Argentina) Federico Coria (second round)
6. (Ecuador) Emilio Gómez (second round, retired)
7. (Italy) Roberto Marcora (quarterfinals)
8. (Italy) Andrea Arnaboldi (quarterfinals)
9. (Italy) Luca Vanni (second round)
10. (Brazil) Rogério Dutra Silva (third round)
11. (Colombia) Santiago Giraldo (third round)
12. (Serbia) Peđa Krstin (second round)
13. (Italy) Gianluigi Quinzi (second round, retired)
14. (Dominican Republic) José Hernández-Fernández (third round)
15. (Chinese Taipei) Wu Tung-lin (second round)
16. (France) Alexandre Müller (third round)

== Draw ==
=== Key ===
- Q = Qualifier
- WC = Wild card
- LL = Lucky loser
- Alt = Alternate
- ITF = ITF entry
- PR = Protected ranking
- SR = Special ranking
- SE = Special exempt
- JE = Junior exempt
- JR = Junior Accelerator Programme entrant
- CO = College Accelerator Programme entrant
- NG = Next Gen Accelerator Program entrant
- w/o = Walkover
- r = Retired
- d = Defaulted

=== Finals ===
Quarterfinals
1	(Slovakia) Andrej Martin	6	7
(Spain) Oriol Roca Batalla	4	5
3	(Italy) Alessandro Giannessi	5	6	7^{7}
8	(Italy) Andrea Arnaboldi	7	3	6^{3}
7	(Italy) Roberto Marcora	2	4
4	(Italy) Federico Gaio	6	6
(Czech Republic) Jan Šátral	1	3
(Argentina) Renzo Olivo	6	6

Semifinals
1	(Slovakia) Andrej Martin	7^{7}	1	6^{8}
3	(Italy) Alessandro Giannessi	6^{3}	6	7^{10}
4	(Italy) Federico Gaio	4	3
(Argentina) Renzo Olivo	6	6

Final
3	(Italy) Alessandro Giannessi	7	6^{4}	4
(Argentina) Renzo Olivo	5	7^{7}	6

=== Top half ===
==== Section 1 ====
First round
ITF	(Belgium) Jeroen Vanneste	6	2
(Slovakia) A Molčan	0	2^{r}
Alt	(Italy) G Zeppieri	4	7	6
Q	(Italy) A Basso	6	5	1
(Spain) O Roca Batalla	6	6
(Czech Republic) V Šafránek	3	3
(Italy) A Vavassori	6	6
WC	(Italy) Samuele Ramazzotti	2	1

Second round
1	(Slovakia) A Martin	6	6
ITF	(Belgium) J Vanneste	2	4
Alt	(Italy) G Zeppieri	6^{5}	2
16	(France) A Müller	7^{7}	6
12	(Serbia) P Krstin	3	6^{6}
(Spain) O Roca Batalla	6	7^{8}
(Italy) A Vavassori	6	7^{7}
5	(Argentina) F Coria	4	6^{4}

Third round
1	(Slovakia) A Martin	6	6
16	(France) A Müller	3	2
(Spain) O Roca Batalla	7^{7}	6
(Italy) A Vavassori	6^{5}	3

Quarterfinals
1	(Slovakia) A Martin	6	7
(Spain) O Roca Batalla	4	5

==== Section 2 ====
First round
ITF	(Australia) C O'Connell	7	6
WC	(Italy) Riccardo Balzerani	5	3
WC	(Italy) L Musetti	2	6	5
(France) M Guinard	6	2	7
PR	(Spain) Í Cervantes	6	4	2
(Peru) JP Varillas	4	6	6
ITF	(Russia) I Nedelko	4	4
ITF	(Italy) R Bonadio	6	6

Second round
3	(Italy) A Giannessi	7^{7}	6
ITF	(Australia) C O'Connell	6^{4}	3
(France) M Guinard	7^{7}	7^{7}
15	(Chinese Taipei) T-l Wu	6^{1}	6^{3}
11	(Colombia) S Giraldo	6	6
(Peru) JP Varillas	4	2
ITF	(Italy) R Bonadio	3	6	4
8	(Italy) A Arnaboldi	6	4	6

Third round
3	(Italy) A Giannessi	6	4	6
(France) M Guinard	3	6	3
11	(Colombia) S Giraldo	6	3	6^{3}
8	(Italy) A Arnaboldi	4	6	7^{7}

Quarterfinals
3	(Italy) A Giannessi	5	6	7^{7}
8	(Italy) A Arnaboldi	7	3	6^{3}

=== Bottom half ===
==== Section 3 ====
First round
(Argentina) A Collarini	6	4	6
ITF	(Italy) Pietro Rondoni	4	6	4
(Italy) A Pellegrino	7	6
(Italy) A Bega	5	3
(Brazil) T Seyboth Wild	6	6
(Spain) C Taberner	0	2
(Dominican Republic) R Cid Subervi	6	2	2
(Brazil) P Sakamoto	2	6	6

Second round
7	(Italy) R Marcora	6	6
(Argentina) A Collarini	4	4
(Italy) A Pellegrino	7	6
9	(Italy) L Vanni	5	4
14	(Dominican Republic) J Hernández-Fernández	1	7^{8}	6
(Brazil) T Seyboth Wild	6	6^{6}	3
(Brazil) P Sakamoto	6^{3}	6	1
4	(Italy) F Gaio	7^{7}	4	6

Third round
7	(Italy) R Marcora	7^{7}	6
(Italy) A Pellegrino	6^{5}	4
14	(Dominican Republic) J Hernández-Fernández	1	4
4	(Italy) F Gaio	6	6

Quarterfinals
7	(Italy) R Marcora	2	4
4	(Italy) F Gaio	6	6

==== Section 4 ====
First round
(Czech Republic) J Šátral	6	6
(Russia) R Safiullin	4	4
LL	(Italy) W Trusendi	6	3	3
Q	(Colombia) DE Galán	3	6	6
(Argentina) R Olivo	6	7
(Norway) V Durasovic	3	5
(Hungary) Z Piros	6	1	2
WC	(Italy) F Forti	4	6	6

Second round
6	(Ecuador) E Gómez	3^{r}
(Czech Republic) J Šátral	2
Q	(Colombia) DE Galán	2	6	3
10	(Brazil) R Dutra Silva	6	3	6
13/WC	(Italy) G Quinzi	3	0^{r}
(Argentina) R Olivo	6	1
WC	(Italy) F Forti	6	6
2	(Italy) G Mager	3	2

Third round
(Czech Republic) J Šátral	6	5	6
10	(Brazil) R Dutra Silva	2	7	4
(Argentina) R Olivo	7	7
WC	(Italy) F Forti	5	5

Quarterfinals
(Czech Republic) J Šátral	1	3
(Argentina) R Olivo	6	6
