= 2016 Torneo de Mendoza =

- Date: 5 – 10 January
- Edition: 1st
- Draw: 32S / 16D
- Prize money: $50,000
- Surface: Clay
- Location: Mendoza, Argentina

Champions

Singles
- (Austria) Gerald Melzer

Doubles
- (Argentina) Máximo González / (Dominican Republic) José Hernández
- Torneo de Mendoza

The 2016 Torneo de Mendoza was a professional tennis tournament played on clay courts. It was the first edition of the tournament, which was part of the 2016 ATP Challenger Tour. It took place in Mendoza, Argentina from 5 to 10 January 2016.

== Singles main-draw entrants ==
=== Seeds ===
Country	Player	Rank^{1}	Seed
ARG	Horacio Zeballos	124	1
BRA	Rogério Dutra Silva	125	2
ESP	Roberto Carballés Baena	131	3
ARG	Facundo Argüello	137	4
ARG	Facundo Bagnis	140	5
SVK	Andrej Martin	146	6
ARG	Máximo González	147	7
AUT	Gerald Melzer	166	8

- Rankings are as of December 28, 2015.

=== Other entrants ===
The following players received wildcards into the singles main draw:

- (Italy) Francisco Bahamonde
- (Argentina) Andrea Collarini
- (France) Gianni Mina
- (Argentina) Juan Pablo Paz

The following players received entry from the qualifying draw:

- (Argentina) Maximiliano Estévez
- (Argentina) Juan Ignacio Galarza
- (Brazil) Thiago Monteiro
- (Germany) Peter Torebko

== Champions ==
=== Singles ===
- (Austria) Gerald Melzer def. (France) Axel Michon 4–6, 6–4, 6–0

=== Doubles ===
- (Argentina) Máximo González / (Dominican Republic) José Hernández def. (Chile) Julio Peralta / (Argentina) Horacio Zeballos 4–6, 6–3, [10–1]
