= 2015 San Benedetto Tennis Cup – Singles =

Singles
- 2015 San Benedetto Tennis Cup

Final
- Champion: (Spain) Albert Ramos-Viñolas
- Runner-up: (Italy) Alessandro Giannessi
- Score: 6–2, 6–4

Events
Singles	Doubles
← 2014 ·	San Benedetto Tennis Cup	· 2016 →

Damir Džumhur was the defending champion, but he lost in the second round to Maxime Hamou.

Albert Ramos-Viñolas won the title, defeating Alessandro Giannessi in the final, 6–2, 6–4.

== Seeds ==
1. (Spain) Daniel Gimeno-Traver (first round)
2. (Spain) Albert Ramos-Viñolas (champion)
3. (France) Benoît Paire (first round, retired)
4. (Bosnia and Herzegovina) Damir Džumhur (second round)
5. (Italy) Paolo Lorenzi (quarterfinals)
6. (Slovenia) Blaž Rola (first round)
7. (Italy) Luca Vanni (first round)
8. (Argentina) Máximo González (first round)

== Draw ==
=== Key ===
- Q = Qualifier
- WC = Wild card
- LL = Lucky loser
- Alt = Alternate
- SE = Special exempt
- PR = Protected ranking
- ITF = ITF entry
- JE = Junior exempt
- w/o = Walkover
- r = Retired
- d = Defaulted
- SR = Special ranking

=== Finals ===
Semifinals
Q	(Italy) Salvatore Caruso	4	2
WC	(Italy) Alessandro Giannessi	6	6
(Italy) Marco Cecchinato	1	3
2	(Spain) Albert Ramos-Viñolas	6	6

Final
WC	(Italy) Alessandro Giannessi	2	4
2	(Spain) Albert Ramos-Viñolas	6	6

=== Top half ===
First round
1/WC	(Spain) D Gimeno-Traver	2	2
Q	(Italy) S Caruso	6	6
Q	(Italy) L Giustino	6	2	6
(Italy) R Marcora	4	6	0
(Italy) G Naso	7	6
(Italy) P Starace	5	4
(Italy) M Donati	7^{7}	7
7	(Italy) L Vanni	6^{2}	5
4	(Bosnia and Herzegovina) D Džumhur	6	6
(Italy) T Fabbiano	2	3
(France) M Hamou	1	7^{7}	7^{8}
(Spain) R Caballés Baena	6	6^{5}	6^{6}
(Austria) G Melzer	3	3
Q	(Austria) M Linzer	6	6
WC	(Italy) A Giannessi	6	6
6	(Slovenia) B Rola	3	3

Second round
Q	(Italy) S Caruso	7^{7}	7^{7}
Q	(Italy) L Giustino	6^{5}	6^{5}
(Italy) G Naso	3	7^{7}	5
(Italy) M Donati	6	6^{5}	7
4	(Bosnia and Herzegovina) D Džumhur	4	5
(France) M Hamou	6	7
Q	(Austria) M Linzer	1	2
WC	(Italy) A Giannessi	6	6

Quarterfinals
Q	(Italy) S Caruso	3	6	7
(Italy) M Donati	6	4	5
(France) M Hamou	3	2
WC	(Italy) A Giannessi	6	6

Semifinals
Q	(Italy) S Caruso	4	2
WC	(Italy) A Giannessi	6	6

=== Bottom half ===
First round
8	(Argentina) M González	6^{9}	1
(Italy) M Cecchinato	7^{11}	6
Q	(Croatia) T Androić	3	3
(Italy) M Viola	6	6
Alt	(Italy) F Gaio	6^{5}	6^{5}
(Germany) A Beck	7^{7}	7^{7}
(Italy) F Volandri	1	6	2
3	(France) B Paire	6	2	0^{r}
5	(Italy) P Lorenzi	6	7
(Croatia) A Veić	3	5
(Germany) P Gojowczyk	3	7	7^{7}
(Egypt) M Safwat	6	5	6^{4}
WC	(Italy) S Napolitano	6	2	4
(Sweden) C Lindell	4	6	6
WC	(Italy) Edoardo Eremin	3	4
2	(Spain) A Ramos-Viñolas	6	6

Second round
(Italy) M Cecchinato	6	6
(Italy) M Viola	1	2
(Germany) A Beck	4	6	1
(Italy) F Volandri	6	1	6
5	(Italy) P Lorenzi	6	6
(Germany) P Gojowczyk	3	3
(Sweden) C Lindell	0	1
2	(Spain) A Ramos-Viñolas	6	6

Quarterfinals
(Italy) M Cecchinato	6	7
(Italy) F Volandri	2	5
5	(Italy) P Lorenzi	3	1
2	(Spain) A Ramos-Viñolas	6	6

Semifinals
(Italy) M Cecchinato	1	3
2	(Spain) A Ramos-Viñolas	6	6
