= 2016 Torneo de Mendoza – Doubles =

Doubles
- 2016 Torneo de Mendoza

Final
- Champions: (Argentina) Máximo González; (Dominican Republic) José Hernández
- Runners-up: (Chile) Julio Peralta; (Argentina) Horacio Zeballos
- Score: 4–6, 6–3, [10–1]

Events
Singles	Doubles
- Torneo de Mendoza

Máximo González and José Hernández won the title, beating top seeds Julio Peralta and Horacio Zeballos 4–6, 6–3, [10–1]

== Seeds ==
1. (Chile) Julio Peralta / (Argentina) Horacio Zeballos (final)
2. (Argentina) Facundo Bagnis / (Argentina) Andrés Molteni (semifinals)
3. (United States) Sekou Bangoura / (United States) Matt Seeberger (first round)
4. (Argentina) Máximo González / (Dominican Republic) José Hernández (champions)

== Draw ==
Key

- Q = Qualifier
- WC = Wild card
- LL = Lucky loser
- Alt = Alternate
- ITF = ITF entry
- PR = Protected ranking
- SR = Special ranking
- SE = Special exempt
- JE = Junior exempt
- JR = Junior Accelerator Programme entrant
- CO = College Accelerator Programme entrant
- NG = Next Gen Accelerator Program entrant
- w/o = Walkover
- r = Retired
- d = Defaulted

First round

Quarterfinals

Semifinals

Final

1
- (Chile) J Peralta
- (Argentina) H Zeballos
6^{5}
6
[10]

- (Argentina) G Andreozzi
- (Uruguay) A Behar
7^{7}
3
[7]

1
- (Chile) J Peralta
- (Argentina) H Zeballos
w/o

WC
(Argentina) F Agamenone
(Argentina) Franco Emanuel Egea
4
4

- (Argentina) A Collarini
- (Ecuador) E Gómez

- (Argentina) A Collarini
- (Ecuador) E Gómez
6
6

1
- (Chile) J Peralta
- (Argentina) H Zeballos
1
6
[10]

3
- (United States) S Bangoura
- (United States) M Seeberger
1
4

- (Brazil) G Clezar
- (Brazil) F Neis
6
4
[7]

- (France) J Eysseric
- (Mexico) MÁ Reyes-Varela
6
6

- (France) J Eysseric
- (Mexico) MÁ Reyes-Varela
4
1

- (Brazil) G Clezar
- (Brazil) F Neis
6
6

- (Brazil) G Clezar
- (Brazil) F Neis
6
6

WC
(Argentina) Nicolas Alejandro De Gregorio
(Argentina) Facundo Jofre
3
2

1
- (Chile) J Peralta
- (Argentina) H Zeballos
6
3
[1]

WC
- (Argentina) Patricio Heras
- (Argentina) T Lipovšek Puches
5
3

4
- (Argentina) M González
- (Dominican Republic) J Hernández
4
6
[10]

- (Spain) R Carballés Baena
- (Spain) E López Pérez
7
6

- (Spain) R Carballés Baena
- (Spain) E López Pérez
3
1

Alt
- (Argentina) H Casanova
- (Argentina) F Coria
6^{1}
6^{1}

4
- (Argentina) M González
- (Dominican Republic) J Hernández
6
6

4
- (Argentina) M González
- (Dominican Republic) J Hernández
7^{7}
7^{7}

4
- (Argentina) M González
- (Dominican Republic) J Hernández
1
7^{8}
[10]

- (Slovakia) A Martin
- (Austria) G Melzer
5
2

2
- (Argentina) F Bagnis
- (Argentina) A Molteni
6
6^{6}
[8]

- (Croatia) I Sabanov
- (Croatia) M Sabanov
7
6

- (Croatia) I Sabanov
- (Croatia) M Sabanov
3
3

- (Brazil) R Dutra Silva
- (Peru) S Galdós
4
6
[9]

2
- (Argentina) F Bagnis
- (Argentina) A Molteni
6
6

2
- (Argentina) F Bagnis
- (Argentina) A Molteni
6
4
[11]
