= 2015 San Benedetto Tennis Cup =

2015 italian tennis tournament

- Date: 11 – 19 July
- Edition: 11th
- Category: ATP Challenger Tour
- Prize money: €64,000+H
- Surface: Clay
- Location: San Benedetto del Tronto, Italy

Champions

Singles
- (Spain) Albert Ramos-Viñolas

Doubles
- (Croatia) Dino Marcan / (Croatia) Antonio Šančić
← 2014 ·	San Benedetto Tennis Cup	· 2016 →

The 2015 San Benedetto Tennis Cup is a professional tennis tournaments played on clay courts. It is the 11th edition of the tournament which is part of the 2015 ATP Challenger Tour, offering a total of €64,000+H in prize money. The event takes place in San Benedetto del Tronto, Italy, from 11 to 20 July 2015, including two days of qualifying competition.

== Singles entrants ==
=== Seeds ===
Country	Player	Rank^{1}	Seed
ESP	Daniel Gimeno-Traver	63	1
ESP	Albert Ramos-Viñolas	65	2
FRA	Benoît Paire	68	3
BIH	Damir Džumhur	88	4
ITA	Paolo Lorenzi	89	5
SLO	Blaž Rola	93	6
ITA	Luca Vanni	113	7
ARG	Máximo González	115	8

- ^{1} Rankings as of 29 June 2015.

=== Other entrants ===
The following players received wildcards into the singles main draw:

- (Italy) Edoardo Eremin
- (Italy) Alessandro Giannessi
- (Spain) Daniel Gimeno-Traver
- (Italy) Stefano Napolitano

The following players entered as an alternate into the singles main draw:

- (Italy) Federico Gaio

The following players received entry from the qualifying draw:

- (Croatia) Toni Androić
- (Italy) Salvatore Caruso
- (Italy) Lorenzo Giustino
- (Austria) Michael Linzer

== Doubles main draw entrants ==
=== Seeds ===
Country	Player	Country	Player	Rank^{1}	Seed
MEX	César Ramírez	MEX	Miguel Ángel Reyes-Varela	260	1
CRO	Dino Marcan	CRO	Antonio Šančić	299	2
ITA	Flavio Cipolla	ITA	Alessandro Motti	304	3
USA	James Cerretani	ROU	Costin Pavăl	310	4

- ^{1} Rankings as of 29 June 2015.

== Champions ==
=== Singles ===
- (Spain) Albert Ramos-Viñolas def. (Italy) Alessandro Giannessi, 6-2, 6-4.

=== Doubles ===
- (Croatia) Dino Marcan / (Croatia) Antonio Šančić def. (Mexico) César Ramírez / (Mexico) Miguel Ángel Reyes-Varela, 6-3, 6-7^{(10-12)}, [12-10]
