= 2018 San Benedetto Tennis Cup – Doubles =

Doubles
- 2018 San Benedetto Tennis Cup

Final
- Champions: (Italy) Julian Ocleppo (Italy) Andrea Vavassori
- Runners-up: (Peru) Sergio Galdós (Bolivia) Federico Zeballos
- Score: 6–3, 6–2

Events
Singles	Doubles
- San Benedetto Tennis Cup

Carlos Taberner and Pol Toledo Bagué were the defending champions but chose not to defend their title.

Julian Ocleppo and Andrea Vavassori won the title after defeating Sergio Galdós and Federico Zeballos 6–3, 6–2 in the final.

== Seeds ==
1. (Italy) Julian Ocleppo / (Italy) Andrea Vavassori (champions)
2. (Peru) Sergio Galdós / (Bolivia) Federico Zeballos (final)
3. (Serbia) Nikola Čačić / (Switzerland) Luca Margaroli (quarterfinals)
4. (Bosnia and Herzegovina) Tomislav Brkić / (Croatia) Ante Pavić (semifinals)

== Draw ==
Key

- Q = Qualifier
- WC = Wild card
- LL = Lucky loser
- Alt = Alternate
- ITF = ITF entry
- PR = Protected ranking
- SR = Special ranking
- SE = Special exempt
- JE = Junior exempt
- JR = Junior Accelerator Programme entrant
- CO = College Accelerator Programme entrant
- NG = Next Gen Accelerator Program entrant
- w/o = Walkover
- r = Retired
- d = Defaulted

First round
1	(Italy) J Ocleppo (Italy) A Vavassori	6	6
(Italy) Riccardo Bonadio (Italy) Edoardo Eremin	3	1
(Italy) D Bracciali (Portugal) F Gil	6	3	[11]
(Ecuador) G Escobar (Mexico) M Sánchez	4	6	[9]
4	(Bosnia and Herzegovina) T Brkić (Croatia) A Pavić	6	7
(Spain) S Gutiérrez Ferrol (Spain) S Martos Gornés	3	5
(Spain) R Ojeda Lara (Spain) O Roca Batalla	6^{3}	2
(Portugal) J Domingues (Serbia) N Milojević	7^{7}	6
(Italy) G Fonio (Italy) Pietro Rondoni	4	6^{6}
WC	(Italy) Riccardo Balzerani (Italy) J Berrettini	6	7^{8}
(Australia) A Taylor (Australia) J Taylor	6^{3}	3
3	(Serbia) N Čačić (Switzerland) L Margaroli	7^{7}	6
(Argentina) A Collarini (Peru) JP Varillas	6	6
(France) B Bonzi (France) G Jacq	3	4
(Italy) Gianluca Di Nicola (Italy) Davide Galoppini	3	2
2	(Peru) S Galdós (Bolivia) F Zeballos	6	6

Quarterfinals
1	(Italy) J Ocleppo (Italy) A Vavassori	6	7^{7}
(Italy) D Bracciali (Portugal) F Gil	4	6^{1}
4	(Bosnia and Herzegovina) T Brkić (Croatia) A Pavić	w/o
(Portugal) J Domingues (Serbia) N Milojević
WC	(Italy) R Balzerani (Italy) J Berrettini	6^{3}	6	[11]
3	(Serbia) N Čačić (Switzerland) L Margaroli	7^{7}	3	[9]
(Argentina) A Collarini (Peru) JP Varillas	7	4	[8]
2	(Peru) S Galdós (Bolivia) F Zeballos	5	6	[10]

Semifinals
1	(Italy) J Ocleppo (Italy) A Vavassori	2	7^{9}	[10]
4	(Bosnia and Herzegovina) T Brkić (Croatia) A Pavić	6	6^{7}	[7]
WC	(Italy) R Balzerani (Italy) J Berrettini	6^{9}	4
2	(Peru) S Galdós (Bolivia) F Zeballos	7^{11}	6

Final
1	(Italy) J Ocleppo (Italy) A Vavassori	6	6
2	(Peru) S Galdós (Bolivia) F Zeballos	3	2
