= Tempe Challenger =

- 2017 Tempe Challenger

Defunct tennis tournament
- Event name: Tempe Challenger
- Location: Tempe, Arizona, United States
- Venue: Whiteman Tennis Center
- Category: ATP Challenger Tour
- Surface: Hard
- Draw: 32S/32Q/16D
- Prize money: $75,000

The Tempe Challenger was a professional tennis tournament played on hardcourts. It was part of the ATP Challenger Tour. It was held in Tempe, Arizona, United States in 2017.

== Past finals ==
=== Singles ===
Year	Champion	Runner-up	Score
2017	(United States) Tennys Sandgren	(Serbia) Nikola Milojević	4–6, 6–0, 6–3

=== Doubles ===
Year	Champions	Runners-up	Score
2017	(Italy) Walter Trusendi (Italy) Matteo Viola	(El Salvador) Marcelo Arévalo (Dominican Republic) José Hernández-Fernández	5–7, 6–2, [12–10]
