= 2017 San Benedetto Tennis Cup – Singles =

Singles
- 2017 San Benedetto Tennis Cup

Final
- Champion: (Italy) Matteo Berrettini
- Runner-up: (Serbia) Laslo Đere
- Score: 6–3, 6–4

Events
Singles	Doubles
- San Benedetto Tennis Cup

Federico Gaio was the defending champion but lost in the second round to Federico Coria.

Matteo Berrettini won the title after defeating Laslo Đere 6–3, 6–4 in the final.

== Seeds ==
1. (Colombia) Santiago Giraldo (second round, retired)
2. (Spain) Marcel Granollers (quarterfinals)
3. (Italy) Luca Vanni (second round)
4. (Serbia) Laslo Đere (final)
5. (Spain) Roberto Carballés Baena (second round, retired)
6. (Portugal) Pedro Sousa (quarterfinals)
7. (Italy) Stefano Travaglia (second round)
8. (Italy) Federico Gaio (second round)

== Draw ==
Key

- Q = Qualifier
- WC = Wild card
- LL = Lucky loser
- Alt = Alternate
- ITF = ITF entry
- PR = Protected ranking
- SR = Special ranking
- SE = Special exempt
- JE = Junior exempt
- JR = Junior Accelerator Programme entrant
- CO = College Accelerator Programme entrant
- NG = Next Gen Accelerator Program entrant
- w/o = Walkover
- r = Retired
- d = Defaulted

=== Finals ===
Semifinals
(Italy) Matteo Berrettini	6	6
(Argentina) Federico Coria	2	4
4/SE	(Serbia) Laslo Đere	6	6
(Spain) Carlos Taberner	4	3

Final
(Italy) Matteo Berrettini	6	6
4/SE	(Serbia) Laslo Đere	3	4

=== Top half ===
First round
1	(Colombia) S Giraldo	1	6	6
PR	(Italy) R Marcora	6	3	2
(Italy) M Berrettini	6	6
(Italy) A Arnaboldi	4	4
PR	(Spain) J Martí	6	1	6
(France) A Michon	3	6	1
(Italy) S Caruso	1^{r}
6	(Portugal) P Sousa	4
3/WC	(Italy) L Vanni	6	7^{8}
Q	(Italy) A Virgili	3	6^{6}
Q	(Croatia) M Delić	6	3	2
(Dominican Republic) J Hernández-Fernández	3	6	6
(Argentina) F Coria	6	6
Q	(Ecuador) G Escobar	4	2
(France) M Janvier	6	3	5
8	(Italy) F Gaio	4	6	7

Second round
1	(Colombia) S Giraldo	3	0^{r}
(Italy) M Berrettini	6	2
PR	(Spain) J Martí	3	1
6	(Portugal) P Sousa	6	6
3/WC	(Italy) L Vanni	7	4	4
(Dominican Republic) J Hernández-Fernández	5	6	6
(Argentina) F Coria	6	7^{9}
8	(Italy) F Gaio	0	6^{7}

Quarterfinals
(Italy) M Berrettini	6	6
6	(Portugal) P Sousa	2	4
(Dominican Republic) J Hernández-Fernández	2	4
(Argentina) F Coria	6	6

Semifinals
(Italy) M Berrettini	6	6
(Argentina) F Coria	2	4

=== Bottom half ===
First round
5	(Spain) R Carballés Baena	6	6
WC	(Italy) A Pellegrino	1	2
(France) M Hamou	2	3
(France) B Bonzi	6	6
(Serbia) D Petrović	6	6
PR	(Italy) F Cipolla	1	3
(Argentina) A Collarini	7	3	5
4/SE	(Serbia) L Đere	5	6	7
7	(Italy) S Travaglia	6	6
(Germany) Y Maden	3	3
(Italy) L Giustino	3	5
(Spain) C Taberner	6	7
WC	(Italy) G Mager	6	6
Q	(Argentina) JP Paz	2	2
WC	(Australia) A Popyrin	4	4
2	(Spain) M Granollers	6	6

Second round
5	(Spain) R Carballés Baena	0	1^{r}
(France) B Bonzi	6	2
(Serbia) D Petrović	4	6	6^{2}
4/SE	(Serbia) L Đere	6	2	7^{7}
7	(Italy) S Travaglia	6^{5}	2
(Spain) C Taberner	7^{7}	6
WC	(Italy) G Mager	2	2
2	(Spain) M Granollers	6	6

Quarterfinals
(France) B Bonzi	6	3	6^{6}
4/SE	(Serbia) L Đere	3	6	7^{8}
(Spain) C Taberner	6	7^{7}
2	(Spain) M Granollers	4	6^{3}

Semifinals
4/SE	(Serbia) L Đere	6	6
(Spain) C Taberner	4	3
