= Da Nang Tennis Open =

- 2019 Da Nang Tennis Open

Defunct tennis tournament
- Event name: Da Nang Tennis Open
- Location: Da Nang, Vietnam
- Venue: Tiên Sơn Sports Village
- Category: ATP Challenger Tour
- Surface: Hard
- Draw: 48S/4Q/16D
- Prize money: $54,160

The Da Nang Tennis Open was a professional tennis tournament played on hardcourts. It was part of the ATP Challenger Tour. It was held in Da Nang, Vietnam in 2019.

== Past finals ==
=== Singles ===
Year	Champion	Runner-up	Score
2019	(Spain) Marcel Granollers	(Italy) Matteo Viola	6–2, 6–0

=== Doubles ===
Year	Champions	Runners-up	Score
2019	(Chinese Taipei) Hsieh Cheng-peng (Indonesia) Christopher Rungkat	(India) Leander Paes (Mexico) Miguel Ángel Reyes-Varela	6–3, 2–6, [11–9]
