= Pol Toledo Bagué =

Spanish tennis player (born 1994)

- Country (sports): Spain
- Residence: Barcelona, Spain
- Born: 22 December 1994 (age 31) Girona, Spain
- Height: 1.78 m (5 ft 10 in)
- Retired: 2022
- Plays: Right-handed (two-handed backhand)
- Coach: Ferran Ventura
- Prize money: $128,415

Singles
- Career record: 0–0
- Career titles: 0
- Highest ranking: No. 372 (6 August 2018)

Doubles
- Career record: 0–0
- Career titles: 0
- Highest ranking: No. 204 (13 November 2017)
- Last updated on: 22 April 2024.

Pol Toledo Bagué (born 22 December 1994) is a Spanish former tennis player.

Toledo Bagué has a career high ATP singles ranking of World No. 372 achieved on 6 August 2018. He also has a career high doubles ranking of World No. 204, which he achieved on 13 November 2017.

Toledo Bagué has reached 18 career singles finals with a record of 5 wins and 13 losses all coming on the ITF Futures tour. Additionally, he has reached 40 career doubles finals with a record of 24 wins and 16 losses, which includes 1 ATP Challenger doubles title at the 2017 San Benedetto Tennis Cup.

== ATP Challenger and ITF Futures finals ==
=== Singles: 18 (5–13) ===
| Legend ATP Challenger (0–0) ITF Futures (5–13) | Finals by surface Hard (0–0) Clay (5–13) Grass (0–0) Carpet (0–0) |

| Result | W–L | Date | Tournament | Tier | Surface | Opponent | Score |
|---|---|---|---|---|---|---|---|
| Loss | 0–1 | Apr 2013 | Egypt F2, Cairo | Futures | Clay | (Spain) Enrique López Pérez | 6–2, 0–6, 4–6 |
| Win | 1–1 | Sep 2013 | Egypt F24, Sharm El Sheikh | Futures | Clay | (Egypt) Mazen Osama | 6–3, 0–6, 6–4 |
| Loss | 1–2 | Jan 2016 | Tunisia F3, Hammamet | Futures | Clay | (Germany) Jeremy Jahn | 6–2, 4–6, 5–7 |
| Loss | 1–3 | Feb 2016 | Tunisia F5, Hammamet | Futures | Clay | (Russia) Ivan Nedelko | 0–6, 5–7 |
| Win | 2–3 | Mar 2016 | Tunisia F8, Hammamet | Futures | Clay | (Argentina) Mariano Kestelboim | 6–4, 6–2 |
| Loss | 2–4 | Nov 2016 | Tunisia F31, Hammamet | Futures | Clay | (Portugal) João Domingues | 3–6, 1–6 |
| Win | 3–4 | Apr 2017 | Tunisia F12, Hammamet | Futures | Clay | (Morocco) Lamine Ouahab | 2–6, 7–6^{(9–7)}, 6–3 |
| Loss | 3–5 | Nov 2017 | Morocco F6, Agadir | Futures | Clay | (Russia) Ivan Gakhov | 6–7^{(5–7)}, 5–7 |
| Loss | 3–6 | Mar 2018 | Spain F7, Reus | Futures | Clay | (Italy) Gian Marco Moroni | 3–6, 1–6 |
| Win | 4–6 | Apr 2018 | Egypt F15, Cairo | Futures | Clay | (Croatia) Duje Kekez | 6–4, 6–2 |
| Loss | 4–7 | Feb 2019 | M15 Antalya, Turkey | World Tennis Tour | Clay | (Slovenia) Nik Razboršek | 6–7^{(3–7)}, 3–6 |
| Loss | 4–8 | Mar 2019 | M15 Tabarka, Tunisia | World Tennis Tour | Clay | (Spain) Oriol Roca Batalla | 4–6, 5–7 |
| Loss | 4–9 | Mar 2019 | M15 Tabarka, Tunisia | World Tennis Tour | Clay | (France) Arthur Rinderknech | 4–6, 2–6 |
| Loss | 4–10 | Mar 2019 | M15 Tabarka, Tunisia | World Tennis Tour | Clay | (Czech Republic) Vít Kopřiva | 7–5, 1–6, 0–1 ret. |
| Loss | 4–11 | Apr 2019 | M15 Cairo, Egypt | World Tennis Tour | Clay | (Egypt) Karim-Mohamed Maamoun | 4–6, 1–6 |
| Win | 5–11 | Jun 2019 | M15 Majadahonda, Spain | World Tennis Tour | Clay | (Argentina) Facundo Diaz Acosta | 6–2, 7–6^{(7–2)} |
| Loss | 5–12 | Aug 2019 | M15 Xàtiva, Spain | World Tennis Tour | Clay | (Spain) Imanol Lopez Morillo | 6–7^{(7–9)}, 4–6 |
| Loss | 5–13 | Oct 2019 | M15 Tabarka, Tunisia | World Tennis Tour | Clay | (Croatia) Duje Ajduković | 3–6, 1–6 |

=== Doubles: 40 (24–16) ===
| Legend ATP Challenger (1–0) ITF Futures (23–16) | Finals by surface Hard (2–2) Clay (22–14) Grass (0–0) Carpet (0–0) |

| Result | W–L | Date | Tournament | Tier | Surface | Partner | Opponents | Score |
|---|---|---|---|---|---|---|---|---|
| Loss | 0–1 | Mar 2013 | Spain F6, Badalona | Futures | Clay | (Spain) Jaume Pla Malfeito | (Spain) Jordi Marse-Vidri (Spain) M-A López Jaén | 6–3, 4–6, [11–13] |
| Win | 1–1 | Oct 2013 | Spain F35, El Prat de Llobregat | Futures | Clay | (Australia) Jason Kubler | (Venezuela) Jordi Muñoz Abreu (Netherlands) Mark Vervoort | 6–2, 4–6, [10–6] |
| Win | 2–1 | Feb 2014 | Spain F2, Paguera | Futures | Clay | (Australia) Jason Kubler | (Spain) Oriol Roca Batalla (Germany) Jean-Marc Werner | 6–1, 6–3 |
| Win | 3–1 | Mar 2014 | Spain F5, Reus | Futures | Clay | (Australia) Jason Kubler | (Portugal) Gonçalo Oliveira (Spain) Ivan Gomez Mantilla | 6–4, 6–1 |
| Loss | 3–2 | Apr 2014 | Algeria F2, Algiers | Futures | Clay | (Spain) Marc Garcia-Roman | (Belgium) Julien Dubail (Belgium) Germain Gigounon | 3–6, 4–6 |
| Loss | 3–3 | May 2014 | Spain F8, Lleida | Futures | Clay | (Spain) Sergio Martos Gornés | (Venezuela) Jordi Muñoz Abreu (Netherlands) Mark Vervoort | 6–3, 1–6, [6–10] |
| Win | 4–3 | May 2014 | Spain F10, Vic | Futures | Clay | (Spain) Sergio Martos Gornés | (United States) Noah Rubin (United States) Stefan Kozlov | 6–2, 7–5 |
| Win | 5–3 | Jun 2014 | Spain F11, Santa Margarida de Montbui | Futures | Hard | (Spain) Sergio Martos Gornés | (Spain) Roberto Ortega Olmedo (Spain) Óscar Burrieza López | 7–5, 2–6, [10–6] |
| Win | 6–3 | Jun 2014 | Spain F12, Madrid | Futures | Clay | (Spain) Sergio Martos Gornés | (Spain) Eduard Esteve Lobato (Spain) Oriol Roca Batalla | 6–2, 6–4 |
| Loss | 6–4 | Aug 2014 | Spain F23, Vigo | Futures | Clay | (Spain) Sergio Martos Gornés | (Spain) J-S Arauzo Martinez (Spain) Oriol Roca Batalla | 1–6, 7–5, [5–10] |
| Win | 7–4 | Feb 2015 | Spain F1, Castelldefels | Futures | Clay | (Spain) Sergio Martos Gornés | (Australia) Jake Eames (Portugal) Gonçalo Oliveira | 6–2, 6–3 |
| Win | 8–4 | Feb 2015 | Spain F2, Paguera | Futures | Clay | (Spain) Sergio Martos Gornés | (Spain) J-S Arauzo Martinez (Germany) Jean-Marc Werner | 6–7^{(5–7)}, 6–3, [10–8] |
| Win | 9–4 | Apr 2015 | Spain F9, Reus | Futures | Clay | (Spain) Sergio Martos Gornés | (Spain) J-S Arauzo Martinez (Argentina) M N Martinez | 3–6, 6–1, [10–6] |
| Win | 10–4 | May 2015 | Spain F12, Lleida | Futures | Clay | (Spain) Sergio Martos Gornés | (Spain) J-S Arauzo Martinez (Spain) I Arenas-Gualda | 6–7^{(3–7)}, 6–3, [10–5] |
| Loss | 10–5 | May 2015 | Spain F13, Valldoreix | Futures | Clay | (Spain) Sergio Martos Gornés | (Spain) Gerard Granollers Pujol (Spain) Oriol Roca Batalla | 5–7, 2–6 |
| Win | 11–5 | May 2015 | Spain F14, Vic | Futures | Clay | (Spain) Sergio Martos Gornés | (Netherlands) David Pel (France) Maxime Tabatruong | 3–6, 7–6^{(7–4)}, [17–15] |
| Loss | 11–6 | May 2015 | Spain F15, Santa Margarida de Montbui | Futures | Hard | (Spain) Sergio Martos Gornés | (Spain) R Villacorta-Alonso (Spain) J-S Arauzo Martinez | 4–6, 7–6^{(7–5)}, [6–10] |
| Win | 12–6 | Aug 2015 | Spain F26, Vigo | Futures | Clay | (Spain) Sergio Martos Gornés | (Spain) Eduard Esteve Lobato (Spain) Pedro Martínez | 6–4, 6–3 |
| Win | 13–6 | Oct 2015 | Spain F32, Sant Cugat del Vallès | Futures | Clay | (Spain) Sergio Martos Gornés | (Spain) Andres Artunedo Martinavarro (Canada) Steven Diez | 6–2, 6–3 |
| Win | 14–6 | Nov 2015 | Kuwait F1, Meshref | Futures | Hard | (Spain) Sergio Martos Gornés | (Italy) Francesco Vilardo (Italy) Alessandro Bega | 6–3, 6–0 |
| Loss | 14–7 | Nov 2015 | Kuwait F3, Meshref | Futures | Hard | (Spain) Sergio Martos Gornés | (Russia) Alexander Igoshin (Russia) Evgeny Karlovskiy | 1–6, 7–6^{(8–6)}, [5–10] |
| Win | 15–7 | Jan 2016 | Tunisia F3, Hammamet | Futures | Clay | (Portugal) Fred Gil | (Russia) Kirill Dmitriev (Austria) David Pichler | 3–6, 7–6^{(7–1)}, [10–5] |
| Loss | 15–8 | May 2016 | Algeria F1, Oran | Futures | Clay | (Spain) Adria Mas Mascolo | (France) Alexandre Müller (France) Fabien Reboul | 4–6, 4–6 |
| Win | 16–8 | Nov 2016 | Tunisia F31, Hammamet | Futures | Clay | (Spain) Sergio Martos Gornés | (Italy) Edoardo Sardella (Italy) Luca Giacomini | 6–4, 6–0 |
| Win | 17–8 | Nov 2016 | Tunisia F32, Hammamet | Futures | Clay | (Spain) Sergio Martos Gornés | (France) Jonathan Kanar (Switzerland) Loic Perret | 6–2, 6–2 |
| Loss | 17–9 | Nov 2016 | Tunisia F33, Hammamet | Futures | Clay | (Spain) Sergio Martos Gornés | (Hungary) Attila Balázs (Portugal) Gonçalo Oliveira | 4–6, 3–6 |
| Win | 18–9 | Mar 2017 | Tunisia F10, Hammamet | Futures | Clay | (Spain) Oriol Roca Batalla | (Brazil) Nicolas Santos (Brazil) Oscar Jose Gutierrez | 6–4, 7–6^{(7–5)} |
| Win | 19–9 | Mar 2017 | Tunisia F11, Hammamet | Futures | Clay | (Venezuela) Jordi Muñoz Abreu | (Hungary) Peter Balla (Japan) Shunsuke Wakita | 6–4, 6–1 |
| Win | 20–9 | Apr 2017 | Tunisia F13, Hammamet | Futures | Clay | (Spain) Sergio Martos Gornés | (France) Amaury Delmas (Switzerland) Loic Perret | 6–2, 6–4 |
| Loss | 20–10 | Jul 2017 | France F13, Montauban | Futures | Clay | (Spain) Adria Mas Mascolo | (France) Benjamin Bonzi (France) Grégoire Jacq | 1–6, 6–3, [7–10] |
| Win | 21–10 | Jul 2017 | San Benedetto, Italy | Challenger | Clay | (Spain) Carlos Taberner | (Italy) Flavio Cipolla (Romania) Adrian Ungur | 7–5, 6–4 |
| Loss | 21–11 | Aug 2017 | Turkey F30, Istanbul | Futures | Clay | (Spain) Sergio Martos Gornés | (Argentina) Franco Agamenone (Argentina) Matias Zukas | 2–6, 6–1, [15–17] |
| Win | 22–11 | Oct 2017 | Tunisia F28, Hammamet | Futures | Clay | (France) Laurent Rochette | (Brazil) Luís Britto (Brazil) Marcelo Zormann | 6–4, 6–1 |
| Loss | 22–12 | Nov 2017 | Morocco F6, Agadir | Futures | Clay | (Spain) Sergio Martos Gornés | (Argentina) Franco Agamenone (Italy) Raúl Brancaccio | 2–6, 2–6 |
| Loss | 22–13 | Apr 2018 | Egypt F15, Cairo | Futures | Clay | (France) Florent Diep | (Italy) Marco Bortolotti (Italy) Nicolo Turchetti | 7–6^{(7–4)}, 2–6, [5–10] |
| Loss | 22–14 | Jan 2019 | M15 Palmanova, Spain | World Tennis Tour | Clay | (Spain) Jaume Pla Malfeito | (Belgium) Jeroen Vanneste (Spain) Sergio Martos Gornés | 3–6, 2–6 |
| Win | 23–14 | Feb 2019 | M15 Palmanova, Spain | World Tennis Tour | Clay | (Spain) Eduard Esteve Lobato | (Argentina) Hernán Casanova (Spain) Jaume Pla Malfeito | 7–5, 5–7, [10–6] |
| Loss | 23–15 | Mar 2019 | M15 Tabarka, Tunisia | World Tennis Tour | Clay | (Spain) Imanol Lopez Morillo | (Brazil) João Pedro Sorgi (Argentina) Mariano Kestelboim | walkover |
| Loss | 23–16 | Aug 2019 | M15 Xàtiva, Spain | World Tennis Tour | Clay | (Spain) Imanol Lopez Morillo | (Spain) Benjamín Winter López (Spain) Alberto Barroso Campos | 6–3, 6–7^{(3–7)}, [8–10] |
| Win | 24–16 | Jan 2021 | M15 Cairo, Egypt | World Tennis Tour | Clay | (Spain) Gerard Granollers Pujol | (Austria) Lukas Krainer (Russia) Ivan Gakhov | 5–7, 6–3, [10–3] |

|}
