= 2017 San Benedetto Tennis Cup =

- Date: 17 – 23 July
- Edition: 13th
- Category: ATP Challenger Tour
- Surface: Clay
- Location: San Benedetto del Tronto, Italy

Champions

Singles
- (Italy) Matteo Berrettini

Doubles
- (Spain) Carlos Taberner / (Spain) Pol Toledo Bagué
- San Benedetto Tennis Cup

The 2017 San Benedetto Tennis Cup was a professional tennis tournaments played on clay courts. It was the 13th edition of the tournament which was part of the 2017 ATP Challenger Tour. The event takes place in San Benedetto del Tronto, Italy, from 17 to 23 July 2017.

== Singles entrants ==
=== Seeds ===
Country	Player	Rank^{1}	Seed
COL	Santiago Giraldo	101	1
ESP	Marcel Granollers	112	2
ITA	Luca Vanni	121	3
SRB	Laslo Djere	123	4
ESP	Roberto Carballés Baena	134	5
POR	Pedro Sousa	153	6
ITA	Stefano Travaglia	155	7
ITA	Federico Gaio	162	8

- ^{1} Rankings as of 3 July 2017.

=== Other entrants ===
The following players received wildcards into the singles main draw:

- (Italy) Gianluca Mager
- (Italy) Andrea Pellegrino
- (Australia) Alexei Popyrin
- (Italy) Luca Vanni

The following players received entry into the singles main draw using protected rankings:

- (Italy) Flavio Cipolla
- (Italy) Roberto Marcora
- (Spain) Javier Martí

The following player received entry into the singles main draw as a special exempt:

- (Serbia) Laslo Djere

The following players received entry from the qualifying draw:

- (Croatia) Mate Delić
- (Ecuador) Gonzalo Escobar
- (Argentina) Juan Pablo Paz
- (Italy) Adelchi Virgili

== Champions ==
=== Singles ===
- (Italy) Matteo Berrettini def. (Serbia) Laslo Djere 6–3, 6–4.

=== Doubles ===
- (Spain) Carlos Taberner / (Spain) Pol Toledo Bagué def. (Italy) Flavio Cipolla / (Romania) Adrian Ungur 7–5, 6–4.
