= Matteo Viola =

Italian tennis player

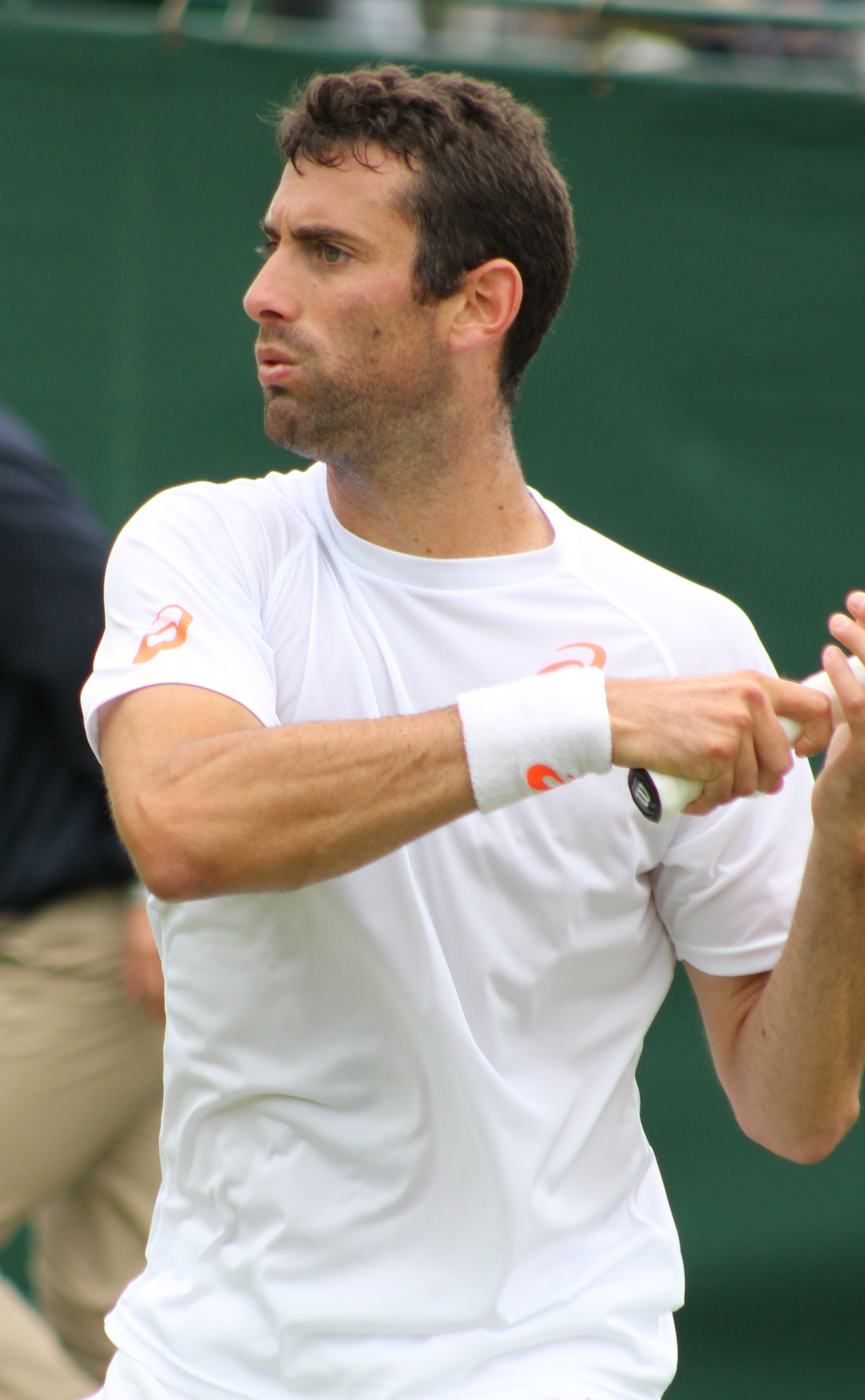
- Country (sports): Italy
- Residence: Marghera, Italy
- Born: 7 July 1987 (age 37); Mestre, Italy
- Height: 1.88 m (6 ft 2 in)
- Turned pro: 2004
- Retired: 2022
- Plays: Right-handed (two-handed backhand)
- Coach: Marco Cepile Andrea Mantegazza
- Prize money: $797,912

Singles
- Career record: 4–13
- Career titles: 0
- Highest ranking: No. 118 (18 March 2013)

Grand Slam singles results
- Australian Open: 1R (2012)
- French Open: Q2 (2015)
- Wimbledon: Q3 (2012)
- US Open: Q2 (2010, 2011, 2014)

Doubles
- Career record: 1–1
- Career titles: 0
- Highest ranking: No. 171 (24 September 2012)

Matteo Viola (Italian pronunciation: [matˈtɛːo viˈɔːla, - ˈvjɔː-]; born 7 July 1987) is an Italian former professional tennis player. He competes mainly on the ATP Challenger Tour and ITF Futures, both in singles and doubles. He reached his highest ATP singles ranking, No. 118 on 18 March 2013 and his highest ATP doubles ranking, No. 171 on 24 September 2012.

== Challenger and Futures finals ==
=== Singles: 34 (17–17) ===
Legend (singles) ATP Challenger Tour (3–6) ITF Futures Tour (14–11)	Titles by surface Hard (4–5) Clay (13–11) Grass (0–0) Carpet (1–0)

Result	W–L	Date	Tournament	Tier	Surface	Opponent	Score
Loss	0–1	Jun 2005	Italy F18, Castelfranco	Futures	Clay	(Italy) Massimo Ocera	4–6, 0–6
Win	1–1	Aug 2006	Italy F25, Imperia	Futures	Clay	(France) Vincent Millot	6–3, 1–6, 6–0
Win	2–1	May 2008	Hungary F3, Budapest	Futures	Clay	(Hungary) Attila Balázs	7–6^{(7–5)}, 6–3
Loss	2–2	Jul 2008	Italy F22, Palazzolo	Futures	Clay	(Chile) Guillermo Hormazábal	4–6, 6–3, 4–6
Win	3–2	Aug 2008	Lithuania F2, Vilnius	Futures	Clay	(France) Pierre Metenier	6–3, 6–2
Win	4–2	May 2009	Romania F2, Bucharest	Futures	Clay	(Romania) Cătălin-Ionuț Gârd	w/o
Loss	4–3	Jun 2009	Italy F14, Mestre	Futures	Clay	(Russia) Andrey Kuznetsov	6–3, 1–6, 4–6
Loss	4–4	Aug 2009	Austria F8, Pörtschach	Futures	Clay	(Slovenia) Janez Semrajč	4–6, 3–6
Loss	4–5	Oct 2009	Italy F30, Quartu Sant'Elena	Futures	Hard	(Canada) Vasek Pospisil	1–6, 2–6
Loss	4–6	Oct 2009	Italy F32, Frascati	Futures	Clay	(Montenegro) Goran Tošić	0–6, 6–7^{(3–7)}
Loss	4–7	Mar 2010	Croatia F2, Rovinj	Futures	Clay	(Hungary) Attila Balázs	4–6, 4–6
Win	5–7	May 2010	USA F11, Orange Park	Futures	Clay	(Italy) Stefano Ianni	6–2, 6–1
Win	6–7	Jun 2010	Italy F12, Mestre	Futures	Clay	(Italy) Matteo Marrai	7–6^{(7–2)}, 6–2
Win	7–7	Jul 2010	Italy F18, Modena	Futures	Clay	(Slovenia) Blaž Rola	6–1, 4–6, 6–1
Win	8–7	Aug 2010	Italy F22, Este	Futures	Clay	(Serbia) Dušan Lajović	7–5, 6–1
Loss	8–8	Mar 2011	Caltanissetta, Italy	Challenger	Clay	(Austria) Andreas Haider-Maurer	1–6, 6–7^{(1–7)}
Win	9–8	Jun 2011	Morocco F4, Casablanca	Futures	Clay	(Switzerland) Michael Lammer	6–1, 6–4
Loss	9–9	Jul 2011	Orbetello, Italy	Challenger	Clay	(Italy) Filippo Volandri	6–4, 3–6, 2–6
Loss	9–10	Oct 2011	Morocco F8, Tanger	Futures	Clay	(France) Axel Michon	1–6, 6–2, 4–6
Win	10–10	Nov 2011	Guayaquil, Ecuador	Challenger	Clay	(Argentina) Guido Pella	6–4, 6–1
Win	11–10	Nov 2012	Yokohama, Japan	Challenger	Hard	(Bosnia and Herzegovina) Mirza Bašić	7–6^{(7–3)}, 6–3
Loss	11–11	Sep 2013	St Remy de Provence, France	Challenger	Hard	(France) Marc Gicquel	4–6, 3–6
Win	12–11	Sep 2014	Biella, Italy	Challenger	Clay	(Italy) Filippo Volandri	7–5, 6–1
Loss	12–12	Jun 2015	Perugia, Italy	Challenger	Clay	(Spain) Pablo Carreño Busta	2–6, 2–6
Loss	12–13	Feb 2016	Israel F1, Ramat Gan	Futures	Hard	(France) Yannick Jankovits	3–6, 4–6
Loss	12–14	Jun 2016	Italy F13, Padova	Futures	Clay	(Italy) Riccardo Bellotti	6–2, 1–6, 1–6
Win	13–14	Nov 2016	Italy F37, Latina	Futures	Clay	(Hungary) Attila Balázs	0–6, 7–5, 6–2
Win	14–14	Mar 2017	Italy F2, Trento	Futures	Carpet (i)	(France) Yannick Jankovits	7–6^{(8–6)}, 6–0
Win	15–14	Apr 2017	Tunisia F15, Hammamet	Futures	Clay	(Argentina) Hernán Casanova	6–4, 6–3
Win	16–14	Jun 2017	Spain F18, Palma del Río	Futures	Hard	(Spain) Alejandro Davidovich Fokina	7–6^{(7–0)}, 7–5
Loss	16–15	Oct 2017	Greece F6, Heraklion	Futures	Hard	(Netherlands) Tallon Griekspoor	6–7^{(4–7)}, 4–6
Win	17–15	Jan 2018	Hong Kong F6, Hong Kong	Futures	Hard	(Finland) Harri Heliövaara	3–6, 6–2, 7–6^{(7–5)}
Loss	17–16	Jan 2019	Danang, Vietnam	Challenger	Hard	(Spain) Marcel Granollers	2–6, 0–6
Loss	17–17	Sep 2019	Mallorca, Spain	Challenger	Hard	(Finland) Emil Ruusuvuori	0–6, 1–6

=== Doubles: 28 (13–15) ===
Legend (doubles) ATP Challenger Tour (5–7) ITF Futures Tour (8–8)	Titles by surface Hard (1–3) Clay (12–11) Grass (0–0) Carpet (0–1)

Result	W–L	Date	Tournament	Tier	Surface	Partner	Opponents	Score
Loss	0–1	Sep 2007	Austria F11, St. Pölten	Futures	Clay	(Italy) Andrea Fava	(Slovakia) Alexander Somogyi (Slovakia) Ján Stančík	1–6, 1–6
Loss	0–2	May 2008	Italy F11, Aosta	Futures	Clay	(Italy) Giacomo Miccini	(Chile) Guillermo Hormazábal (Chile) Hans Podlipnik Castillo	2–6, 4–6
Win	1–2	Jun 2008	Italy F18, Trieste	Futures	Clay	(Italy) Andrea Fava	(Finland) Harri Heliövaara (Finland) Tuomo Ojala	6–2, 4–6, [10–1]
Loss	1–3	Jun 2008	Italy F19, Castelfranco	Futures	Clay	(Italy) Walter Trusendi	(Italy) Giancarlo Petrazzuolo (Italy) Federico Torresi	6–7^{(4–7)}, 6–7^{(5–7)}
Loss	1–4	Jul 2008	Italy F20, Bologna	Futures	Clay	(Italy) Andrea Fava	(Czech Republic) Dušan Lojda (Italy) Federico Torresi	0–6, 4–6
Win	2–4	Jun 2009	Tunisia F1, Hammamet	Futures	Clay	(Italy) Valerio Carrese	(Australia) Joshua Crowe (New Zealand) Matt Simpson	2–6, 6–2, [11–9]
Win	3–4	Jan 2010	USA F2, Hollywood	Futures	Clay	(Italy) Stefano Ianni	(Spain) Arnau Brugués Davi (Dominican Republic) Víctor Estrella Burgos	6–7^{(1–7)}, 6–1, [10–7]
Loss	3–5	Jan 2010	USA F3, Tamarac	Futures	Clay	(Italy) Stefano Ianni	(Romania) Cătălin-Ionuț Gârd (United States) Christian Guevara	6–2, 4–6, [6–10]
Win	4–5	Mar 2010	Croatia F1, Poreč	Futures	Clay	(Spain) Carlos Poch Gradin	(Hungary) Attila Balázs (Bosnia and Herzegovina) Ismar Gorčić	7–6^{(7–3)}, 6–4
Win	5–5	Jun 2010	Italy F12, Mestre	Futures	Clay	(Italy) Walter Trusendi	(Serbia) Nikola Ćirić (Croatia) Franko Škugor	6–7^{(8–10)}, 6–1, [10–2]
Loss	5–6	Jun 2010	Italy F13, Padova	Futures	Clay	(Italy) Paolo Beninca	(Italy) Alessandro Giannessi (Italy) Federico Torresi	1–6, 6–7^{(3–7)}
Win	6–6	Oct 2017	Morocco F8, Tanger	Futures	Clay	(Italy) Luca Vanni	(Czech Republic) Roman Jebavý (Czech Republic) Jan Šátral	6–3, 7–5
Loss	6–7	Nov 2011	Medellín, Colombia	Challenger	Clay	(Italy) Alessio di Mauro	(Chile) Paul Capdeville (Chile) Nicolás Massú	2–6, 6–4, [8–10]
Win	7–7	Nov 2011	USA F31, Amelia Island	Futures	Clay	(Czech Republic) Rudolf Siwy	(France) Alexandre Lacroix (Germany) Tim Pütz	7–6^{(7–3)}, 6–1
Win	8–7	Mar 2012	Casablanca, Morocco	Challenger	Clay	(Italy) Walter Trusendi	(Russia) Evgeny Donskoy (Russia) Andrey Kuznetsov	1–6, 7–6^{(7–5)}, [10–3]
Loss	8–8	Aug 2012	San Marino, San Marino	Challenger	Clay	(Italy) Stefano Ianni	(Czech Republic) Lukáš Dlouhý (Slovakia) Michal Mertiňák	6–2, 6–7^{(3–7)}, [9–11]
Loss	8–9	Nov 2012	Toyota, Japan	Challenger	Carpet (i)	(Italy) Andrea Arnaboldi	(Austria) Philipp Oswald (Croatia) Mate Pavić	3–6, 6–3, [2–10]
Win	9–9	Apr 2013	Santos, Brazil	Challenger	Clay	(Slovakia) Pavol Červenák	(Brazil) Guilherme Clezar (Portugal) Gastão Elias	6–2, 4–6, [10–6]
Loss	9–10	Apr 2014	Mersin, Turkey	Challenger	Clay	(Italy) Thomas Fabbiano	(Moldova) Radu Albot (Czech Republic) Jaroslav Pospíšil	6–7^{(7–9)}, 1–6
Loss	9–11	May 2014	Ostrava, Czech Republic	Challenger	Clay	(Italy) Alessandro Motti	(Russia) Andrey Kuznetsov (Spain) Adrián Menéndez Maceiras	6–4, 3–6, [8–10]
Loss	9–12	Sep 2014	Alphan aan den Rijn, Netherlands	Challenger	Clay	(Spain) Rubén Ramírez Hidalgo	(Netherlands) Antal van der Duim (Netherlands) Boy Westerhof	1–6, 3–6
Win	10–12	Sep 2014	Biella, Italy	Challenger	Clay	(Italy) Marco Cecchinato	(Germany) Frank Moser (Germany) Alexander Satschko	7–5, 6–0
Loss	10–13	Mar 2015	Kazan, Russia	Challenger	Hard (i)	(Italy) Andrea Arnaboldi	(Russia) Mikhail Elgin (Slovakia) Igor Zelenay	3–6, 3–6
Win	11–13	Aug 2015	Cortina d'Ampezzo, Italy	Challenger	Clay	(Italy) Paolo Lorenzi	(Chinese Taipei) Lee Hsin-han (Italy) Alessandro Motti	6–7^{(5–7)}, 6–4, [10–3]
Win	12–13	Aug 2016	Italy F25, Padova	Futures	Clay	(France) Jonathan Eysseric	(Italy) Francisco Bahamonde (Uruguay) Marcel Felder	4–6, 6–1, [10–8]
Win	13–13	Feb 2017	Tempe, USA	Challenger	Hard	(Italy) Walter Trusendi	(El Salvador) Marcelo Arévalo (Dominican Republic) José Hernández-Fernández	5–7, 6–2, [12–10]
Loss	13–14	Mar 2017	Italy F4, Sondrio	Futures	Hard (i)	(Italy) Walter Trusendi	(Czech Republic) Petr Nouza (Czech Republic) David Škoch	3–6, 7–5, [8–10]
Loss	13–15	Jun 2017	Spain F18, Palma del Río	Futures	Hard	(Switzerland) Adrien Bossel	(Denmark) Frederik Nielsen (Republic of Ireland) David O'Hare	1–6, 6–7^{(1–7)}
