= José Hernández-Fernández =

Dominican Republic tennis player (born 1990)

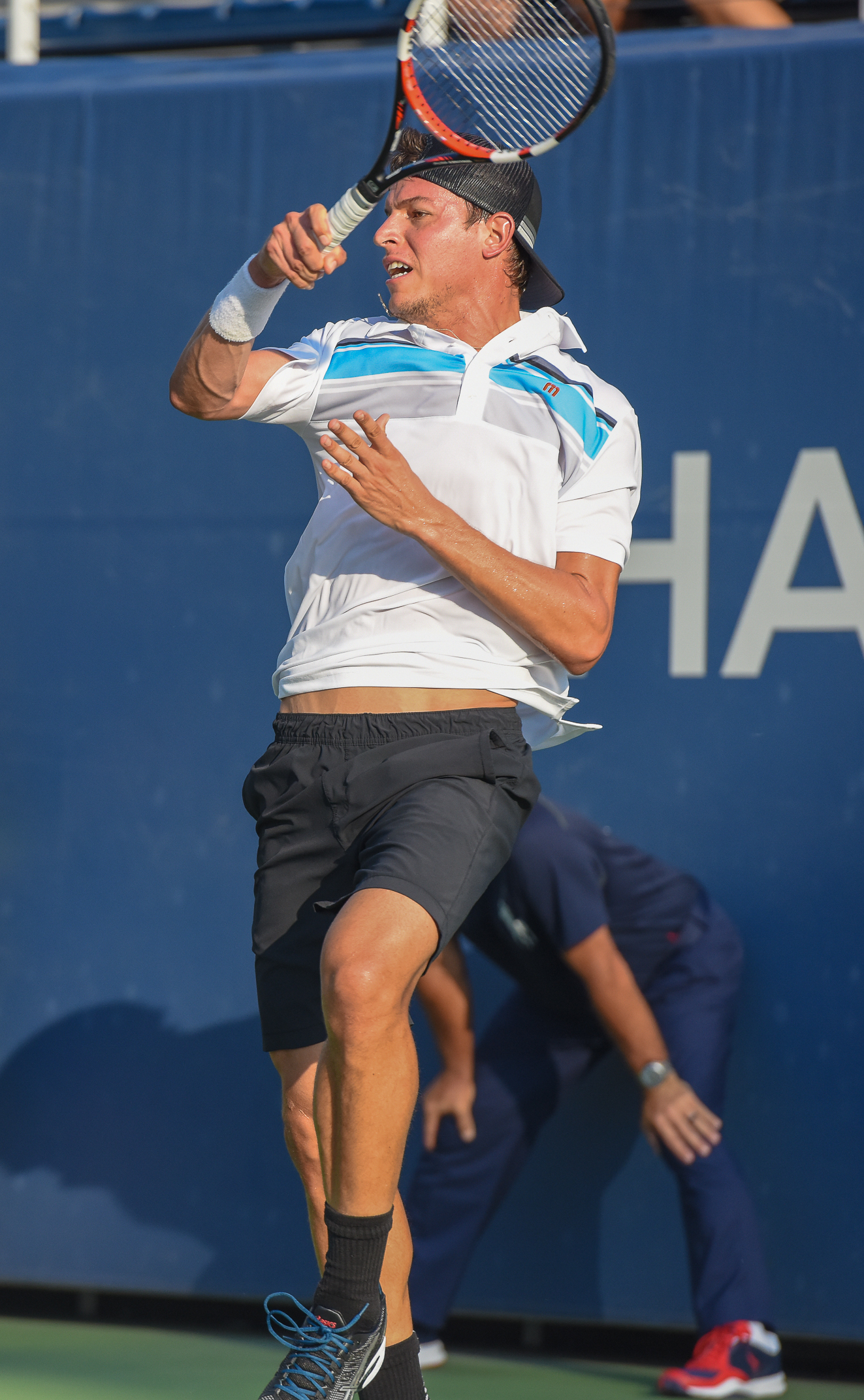
- Hernández-Fernández at the 2015 US Open qualifying tournament
- Country (sports): Dominican Republic
- Residence: Santo Domingo, Dominican Republic
- Born: 13 March 1990 (age 35) Santo Domingo, Dominican Republic
- Height: 1.83 m (6 ft 0 in)
- Turned pro: 2008
- Retired: 2020
- Plays: Right-handed (two-handed backhand)
- Coach: Leonardo Olguín
- Prize money: $235,328

Singles
- Career record: 14–17
- Career titles: 0
- Highest ranking: No. 179 (3 August 2015)

Grand Slam singles results
- Australian Open: Q1 (2017)
- Wimbledon: Q1 (2015)
- US Open: Q2 (2015)

Doubles
- Career record: 7–7
- Career titles: 0
- Highest ranking: No. 209 (September 19, 2016)
- Last updated on: 30 June 2021.

José Hernández-Fernández
Medal record

Representing Dominican Republic

Men's Tennis

Central American and Caribbean Games
Silver medal – second place	2014 Veracruz	Singles
Bronze medal – third place	2010 Mayagüez	Mixed doubles

José Hernández-Fernández (Latin American Spanish: [xoˈse eɾˈnandes feɾˈnandes]; born March 13, 1990) is a tennis coach and a former professional player from the Dominican Republic. He reached his highest singles ranking on the ATP Tour of World No. 179 in August 2015 and his highest doubles ranking of No. 206 in 2016.

== College career ==
Prior to joining UNC Hernández-Fernández received offers from Texas A&M, Ohio State, Pepperdine, among others.

Hernández-Fernández played tennis at the University of North Carolina in Chapel Hill. In 2011, he reached the round of 16 in the 2011 NCAA Division I Tennis Championships losing to the previous year champion Bradley Klahn from Stanford.

He finished his career at UNC ranked No. 9 in singles and ranked No. 6 in doubles in the nation in the 2012 pre-season NCAA Div 1 rankings before turning pro. He was twice a member of the "All-ACC" team. Combined record at UNC was 48 wins and 17 losses.

== Professional career ==
=== Juniors ===
Ranked No. 37 in the world junior rankings by the International Tennis Federation. Reached the round of 16 in the US Open Junior Tennis Championships. He played in the 2008 Wimbledon Junior Championships losing to the 2008 French Open champion Yang Tsung-hua. Reached the round of 32 in the main draw of the Roland Garros Junior Championships. Won the JITIC tournament in Monterrey, Mexico. Made the finals of the Copa Merengue tournament in Santo Domingo, Dominican Republic. Finalist of the Barranquilla Junior Tennis Tournament in Barranquilla, Colombia.

=== Seniors ===
Hernández-Fernández played primarily on the Futures circuit with a record of 74-40 and the ATP Challenger Tour where he currently has a record of 5–11.

Hernández-Fernández was a member of the Dominican Republic Davis Cup team, having posted a 7–5 record in singles and a 5–1 record in doubles in eighteen ties played since 2006. He trained at the JC Ferrero Equelite Sport Academy in Alicante.

Hernández-Fernández represented the Dominican Republic in multiple international competitions. He partnered with countrywoman Chandra Capozzi in the mixed doubles competition at the 2010 Central American and Caribbean Games, winning the bronze medal. He also represented the Dominican Republic at the 2011 Pan American Games, though did not win any medals at the Games.

== Post-retirement career ==
Following his retirement in 2020, Hernandez started coaching Yuan Yue in 2024. Since 2025, he is the tournament director of the Copa Cap Cana.

== ATP Challenger and ITF Tour finals ==
=== Singles: 16 (9–7) ===
Legend ATP Challenger (0–0) ITF Futures (9–7)	Finals by surface Hard (3–4) Clay (6–3)

Result	W–L	Date	Tournament	Tier	Surface	Opponent	Score
Loss	0–1	Aug 2012	Ecuador F1, Guayaquil	Futures	Hard	(Ecuador) Emilio Gómez	3–6, 6–4, 2–6
Win	1–1	Aug 2012	Ecuador F2, Guayaquil	Futures	Hard	(Ecuador) Emilio Gómez	2–6, 6–3, 6–4
Loss	1–2	Apr 2013	Turkey F15, Antalya	Futures	Hard	(Brazil) Thiago Monteiro	3–6, 6–7^{(5–7)}
Win	2–2	May 2013	Venezuela F1, Maracay	Futures	Hard	(Ecuador) Iván Endara	6–3, 6–3
Loss	2–3	Aug 2013	Venezuela F4, Caracas	Futures	Hard	(Venezuela) David Souto	2–6, 6–4, 2–6
Win	3–3	Oct 2013	Peru F2, Lima	Futures	Clay	(Chile) Jorge Aguilar	2–6, 6–3, 6–3
Loss	3–4	Jun 2014	Romania F3, Bacău	Futures	Clay	(Sweden) Elias Ymer	6–3, 6–7^{(2–7)}, 5–7
Win	4–4	Aug 2014	Colombia F4, Medellín	Futures	Clay	(El Salvador) Marcelo Arévalo	7–5, 6–2
Loss	4–5	Sep 2014	Colombia F6, Armenia	Futures	Clay	(Colombia) Nicolás Barrientos	4–6, 2–6
Win	5–5	Mar 2015	Argentina F2, Mendoza	Futures	Clay	(Chile) Hans Podlipnik Castillo	4–6, 6–2, 6–3
Win	6–5	Mar 2015	Argentina F3, Olavarria	Futures	Clay	(Argentina) Federico Coria	6–0, 6–1
Win	7–5	Aug 2016	Italy F23, Bolzano	Futures	Clay	(Chile) Bastian Malla	6–4, 6–4
Loss	7–6	Dec 2017	Dominican Republic F2, Santo Domingo	Futures	Hard	(Dominican Republic) Roberto Cid Subervi	3–6, 2–6
Win	8–6	Dec 2017	Dominican Republic F3, Santo Domingo	Futures	Hard	(Colombia) Alejandro Gomez	6–0, 6–7^{(6–8)}, 6–2
Win	9–6	Jul 2019	M15 Cuneo, Italy	World Tennis Tour	Clay	(Italy) Francesco Forti	6–7^{(6–8)}, 6–4, 7–5
Loss	9–7	Sep 2019	M25 Oviedo, Spain	World Tennis Tour	Clay	(Spain) Oriol Roca Batalla	4–6, 4–6

=== Doubles: 14 (6–8) ===
Legend ATP Challenger (1–1) ITF Futures (5–7)	Finals by surface Hard (2–4) Clay (4–4)

Result	W–L	Date	Tournament	Tier	Surface	Partner	Opponents	Score
Loss	0–1	Aug 2012	Ecuador F2, Guayaquil	Futures	Hard	(Peru) Sergio Galdós	(Ecuador) Emilio Gómez (Ecuador) Roberto Quiroz	5–7, 2–6
Loss	0–2	Nov 2012	Mexico F13, Mérida	Futures	Hard	(Guatemala) Christopher Díaz Figueroa	(Switzerland) Riccardo Maiga (Italy) Roberto Marcora	1–6, 6–2, [7–10]
Loss	0–3	Mar 2013	Colombia F2, Bogotá	Futures	Clay	(Argentina) Maximiliano Estévez	(Germany) Gero Kretschmer (Germany) Alexander Satschko	6–7^{(8–10)}, 3–6
Win	1–3	Apr 2013	Turkey F13, Antalya	Futures	Hard	(Argentina) Maximiliano Estévez	(Argentina) Juan Ignacio Londero (Argentina) Mateo Nicolas Martinez	6–3, 7–5
Win	2–3	Apr 2013	Turkey F14, Antalya	Futures	Hard	(Argentina) Maximiliano Estévez	(Moldova) Andrei Ciumac (Switzerland) Luca Margaroli	6–2, 6–1
Win	3–3	Aug 2013	Brazil F4, Manaus	Futures	Clay	(Brazil) José Pereira	(Brazil) Victor Maynard (Brazil) Rafael Rondino	6–1, 6–1
Loss	3–4	Aug 2013	Venezuela F4, Caracas	Futures	Hard	(Venezuela) Roberto Maytín	(Puerto Rico) Alex Llompart (Argentina) Mateo Nicolas Martinez	5–7, 5–7
Loss	3–5	Jul 2014	Italy F21, Mantova	Futures	Clay	(Dominican Republic) Jhonson Garcia	(Brazil) Daniel Dutra da Silva (Brazil) Pedro Sakamoto	7–5, 1–6, [7–10]
Win	4–5	Sep 2014	Colombia F6, Armenia	Futures	Clay	(Argentina) Juan Pablo Guzmán	(South Africa) Keith-Patrick Crowley (Italy) Marco Bortolotti	6–3, 2–6, [12–10]
Win	5–5	Jan 2016	Mendoza, Argentina	Challenger	Clay	(Argentina) Máximo González	(Argentina) Horacio Zeballos (Chile) Julio Peralta	4–6, 6–3, [10–1]
Loss	5–6	Aug 2016	Italy F23, Bolzano	Futures	Clay	(Argentina) Juan Pablo Ficovich	(United States) Cătălin Gârd (Philippines) Ruben Gonzales	1–6, 0–6
Win	6–6	Aug 2016	Italy F24, Cornaiano	Futures	Clay	(France) Jonathan Eysseric	(Chile) Zdeněk Kolář (Chile) Bastian Malla	7–6^{(7–2)}, 2–6, [10–4]
Loss	6–7	Feb 2017	Tempe, United States	Challenger	Hard	(El Salvador) Marcelo Arévalo	(Italy) Walter Trusendi (Italy) Matteo Viola	7–5, 2–6, [10–12]
Loss	6–8	Sep 2019	M25 San Sebastián, Spain	World Tennis Tour	Clay	(Spain) J Barranco Cosano	(Spain) E Esteve Lobato (Spain) Oriol Roca Batalla	5–7, 6–4, [7–10]
