= 2018 Internazionali di Tennis Country 2001 Team – Singles =

Singles
- 2018 Internazionali di Tennis Country 2001 Team

Final
- Champion: (Spain) Sergio Gutiérrez Ferrol
- Runner-up: (Italy) Federico Gaio
- Score: 6–2, 3–6, 6–1

Events
Singles	Doubles
Internazionali di Tennis Country 2001 Team

This was the first edition of the tournament.

Sergio Gutiérrez Ferrol won the title after defeating Federico Gaio 6–2, 3–6, 6–1 in the final.

== Seeds ==
1. (Austria) Gerald Melzer (first round, retired)
2. (Italy) Simone Bolelli (first round)
3. (Slovakia) Andrej Martin (second round, retired)
4. (Chile) Christian Garín (second round)
5. (Italy) Gianluigi Quinzi (first round)
6. (Spain) Daniel Gimeno Traver (first round)
7. (Spain) Carlos Taberner (withdrew)
8. (Spain) Ricardo Ojeda Lara (first round)
9. (Italy) Andrea Arnaboldi (second round)

== Draw ==
=== Key ===
- Q = Qualifier
- WC = Wild card
- LL = Lucky loser
- Alt = Alternate
- SE = Special exempt
- PR = Protected ranking
- ITF = ITF entry
- JE = Junior exempt
- w/o = Walkover
- r = Retired
- d = Defaulted
- SR = Special ranking

=== Finals ===
Semifinals
(Italy) Federico Gaio	6	6
LL	(Peru) Juan Pablo Varillas	4	4
SE	(Spain) Sergio Gutiérrez Ferrol	3	6	6
(Spain) Tommy Robredo	6	1	2

Final
(Italy) Federico Gaio	2	6	1
SE	(Spain) Sergio Gutiérrez Ferrol	6	3	6

=== Top half ===
First round
1	(Austria) G Melzer	5^{r}
(Serbia) M Zekić	1
(Italy) F Gaio	6^{0}	6	6
(Spain) D Muñoz de la Nava	7^{7}	4	3
(Argentina) F Argüello	7^{7}	3^{r}
(Belgium) A De Greef	6^{2}	2
(Croatia) A Pavić	7^{7}	6
5	(Italy) G Quinzi	6^{3}	4
4/WC	(Chile) C Garín	6^{5}	6	6
Alt	(France) B Bonzi	7^{7}	3	2
(Italy) G Mager	5	6	2
LL	(Peru) JP Varillas	7	4	6
(Brazil) T Bellucci	6	5	1
(Bosnia and Herzegovina) T Brkić	2	7	6
WC	(Italy) E Dalla Valle	6^{2}	6	6
8	(Spain) R Ojeda Lara	7^{7}	1	3

Second round
(Serbia) M Zekić	6^{1}	5
(Italy) F Gaio	7^{7}	7
(Belgium) A De Greef	4	7^{7}	4
(Croatia) A Pavić	6	6^{1}	6
4/WC	(Chile) C Garín	3	6^{3}
LL	(Peru) JP Varillas	6	7^{7}
(Bosnia and Herzegovina) T Brkić	6	6
WC	(Italy) E Dalla Valle	2	4

Quarterfinals
(Italy) F Gaio	6	7
(Croatia) A Pavić	4	5
LL	(Peru) JP Varillas	6	6
(Bosnia and Herzegovina) T Brkić	1	1

Semifinals
(Italy) F Gaio	6	6
LL	(Peru) JP Varillas	4	4

=== Bottom half ===
First round
6	(Spain) D Gimeno Traver	3	3
SE	(Spain) S Gutiérrez Ferrol	6	6
Q	(Italy) W Trusendi	3	6	2
Q	(Italy) Luca Giacomini	6	3	6
(Spain) Carlos Boluda-Purkiss	6	6
(Portugal) João Monteiro	4	3
Q	(Argentina) A Velotti	2	4
3	(Slovakia) A Martin	6	6
9	(Italy) A Arnaboldi	6	6
(Germany) J Choinski	2	0
(Italy) M Viola	6	1	1
(Spain) T Robredo	1	6	6
WC	(Italy) J Berrettini	7^{7}	0	6^{3}
WC	(Italy) GM Moroni	6^{2}	6	7^{7}
Q	(Italy) Edoardo Eremin	6	3	6
2	(Italy) S Bolelli	1	6	2

Second round
SE	(Spain) S Gutiérrez Ferrol	w/o
Q	(Italy) L Giacomini
(Spain) C Boluda-Purkiss	6	2
3	(Slovakia) A Martin	1	0^{r}
9	(Italy) A Arnaboldi	4	6^{2}
(Spain) T Robredo	6	7^{7}
WC	(Italy) GM Moroni	6^{2}	7^{7}	4
Q	(Italy) E Eremin	7^{7}	6^{5}	1^{r}

Quarterfinals
SE	(Spain) S Gutiérrez Ferrol	6	6
(Spain) C Boluda-Purkiss	2	4
(Spain) T Robredo	3	6	6
WC	(Italy) GM Moroni	6	3	2

Semifinals
SE	(Spain) S Gutiérrez Ferrol	3	6	6
(Spain) T Robredo	6	1	2
