= 2018 Internazionali di Tennis Country 2001 Team =

- Date: 23–29 July
- Edition: 1st
- Surface: Clay court
- Location: Padua, Italy

Champions

Singles
- (Spain) Sergio Gutiérrez Ferrol

Doubles
- (Bosnia and Herzegovina) Tomislav Brkić / (Croatia) Ante Pavić
Internazionali di Tennis Country 2001 Team

The 2018 Internazionali di Tennis Country 2001 Team was a professional tennis tournament played on clay court. It was the 1st edition of the tournament which was part of the 2018 ATP Challenger Tour. It took place in Padua, Italy between 23 and 29 July 2018.

== Singles main-draw entrants ==
=== Seeds ===
Country	Player	Rank^{1}	Seed
AUT	Gerald Melzer	115	1
ITA	Simone Bolelli	153	2
SVK	Andrej Martin	157	3
CHI	Christian Garín	164	4
ITA	Gianluigi Quinzi	167	5
ESP	Daniel Gimeno Traver	182	6
~~ESP~~	~~Carlos Taberner~~	~~191~~	~~7~~
ESP	Ricardo Ojeda Lara	195	8
ITA	Andrea Arnaboldi	210	9

- ^{1} Rankings are as of July 16, 2018.

=== Other entrants ===
The following players received wildcards into the singles main draw:

- (Italy) Jacopo Berrettini
- (Italy) Enrico Dalla Valle
- (Chile) Christian Garín
- (Italy) Gian Marco Moroni

The following player received entry into the singles main draw as a special exempt:

- (Spain) Sergio Gutiérrez Ferrol

The following player received entry into the singles main draw as an alternate:

- (France) Benjamin Bonzi

The following players received entry from the qualifying draw:

- (Italy) Edoardo Eremin
- (Italy) Luca Giacomini
- (Italy) Walter Trusendi
- (Argentina) Agustín Velotti

The following player received entry as a lucky loser:

- (Peru) Juan Pablo Varillas

== Champions ==
=== Singles ===
- (Spain) Sergio Gutiérrez Ferrol def. (Italy) Federico Gaio 6–2, 3–6, 6–1

=== Doubles ===
- (Bosnia and Herzegovina) Tomislav Brkić / (Croatia) Ante Pavić def. (Italy) Walter Trusendi / (Italy) Andrea Vavassori 6–2, 7–6^{(7–4)}.
