= 2018 Internazionali di Tennis Country 2001 Team – Doubles =

Doubles
- 2018 Internazionali di Tennis Country 2001 Team

Final
- Champions: (Bosnia and Herzegovina) Tomislav Brkić (Croatia) Ante Pavić
- Runners-up: (Italy) Walter Trusendi (Italy) Andrea Vavassori
- Score: 6–2, 7–6^{(7–4)}

Events
| Singles | Doubles |
| Internazionali di Tennis Country 2001 Team |

This was the first edition of the tournament.

Tomislav Brkić and Ante Pavić won the title after defeating Walter Trusendi and Andrea Vavassori 6–2, 7–6^{(7–4)} in the final.

== Seeds ==
1. (Peru) Sergio Galdós / (Bolivia) Federico Zeballos (semifinals)
2. (Serbia) Nikola Čačić / (Italy) Alessandro Motti (first round)
3. (Bosnia and Herzegovina) Tomislav Brkić / (Croatia) Ante Pavić (champions)
4. (Italy) Walter Trusendi / (Italy) Andrea Vavassori (final)

== Draw ==
=== Key ===
- Q = Qualifier
- WC = Wild card
- LL = Lucky loser
- Alt = Alternate
- SE = Special exempt
- PR = Protected ranking
- ITF = ITF entry
- JE = Junior exempt
- w/o = Walkover
- r = Retired
- d = Defaulted
- SR = Special ranking

First round
1 | (Peru) S Galdós (Bolivia) F Zeballos | 6 | 7^{7}
(France) Jonathan Kanar (Italy) Nicolò Turchetti | 2 | 6^{4}
(Colombia) C Rodríguez (Peru) JP Varillas | 7^{7} | 6
(Argentina) F Agamenone (Argentina) F Argüello | 6^{2} | 4
4 | (Italy) W Trusendi (Italy) A Vavassori | 6 | 6
WC | (Italy) Lorenzo Favero (Italy) Alberto Martellato | 0 | 1
(Spain) D Gimeno Traver (Spain) S Martos Gornés | 6 | 6
(Italy) Edoardo Eremin (Italy) G Mager | 3 | 2
(Spain) Carlos Boluda-Purkiss (Spain) S Gutiérrez Ferrol | 6 | 3 | [10]
(Spain) D Muñoz de la Nava (Serbia) M Zekić | 1 | 6 | [4]
WC | (Italy) J Berrettini (Italy) E Dalla Valle | 7 | 3 | [10]
3 | (Bosnia and Herzegovina) T Brkić (Croatia) A Pavić | 5 | 6 | [12]
WC | (Australia) A Taylor (Australia) J Taylor | 7 | 4 | [10]
(France) B Bonzi (France) G Jacq | 5 | 6 | [4]
(Slovakia) A Martin (Austria) T-S Weissborn | 7 | 6
2 | (Serbia) N Čačić (Italy) A Motti | 5 | 3

Quarterfinals
1 | (Peru) S Galdós (Bolivia) F Zeballos | 6 | 7
(Colombia) C Rodríguez (Peru) JP Varillas | 2 | 5
4 | (Italy) W Trusendi (Italy) A Vavassori | 7^{7} | 7
(Spain) D Gimeno Traver (Spain) S Martos Gornés | 6^{3} | 5
(Spain) C Boluda-Purkiss (Spain) S Gutiérrez Ferrol | 3 | 4
3 | (Bosnia and Herzegovina) T Brkić (Croatia) A Pavić | 6 | 6
WC | (Australia) A Taylor (Australia) J Taylor | 6 | 4
(Slovakia) A Martin (Austria) T-S Weissborn | 3 | 0^{r}

Semifinals
1 | (Peru) S Galdós (Bolivia) F Zeballos | 7^{7} | 6^{4} | [5]
4 | (Italy) W Trusendi (Italy) A Vavassori | 6^{5} | 7^{7} | [10]
3 | (Bosnia and Herzegovina) T Brkić (Croatia) A Pavić | 6 | 6
WC | (Australia) A Taylor (Australia) J Taylor | 3 | 4

Final
4 | (Italy) W Trusendi (Italy) A Vavassori | 2 | 6^{4}
3 | (Bosnia and Herzegovina) T Brkić (Croatia) A Pavić | 6 | 7^{7}
