= 2012 Carisap Tennis Cup – Singles =

Singles
- 2012 Carisap Tennis Cup

Final
- Champion: (Italy) Gianluca Naso
- Runner-up: (Austria) Andreas Haider-Maurer
- Score: 6–4, 7–5

Events
Singles	Doubles
- Carisap Tennis Cup

Adrian Ungur was the defending champion but decided not to participate.
Gianluca Naso won the final against Andreas Haider-Maurer 6–4, 7–5.

== Seeds ==
1. (Austria) Andreas Haider-Maurer (final)
2. (Spain) Arnau Brugués Davi (quarterfinals)
3. (Canada) Peter Polansky (first round)
4. (Germany) Peter Gojowczyk (first round)
5. (Italy) Gianluca Naso (champion)
6. (Switzerland) Michael Lammer (quarterfinals)
7. (Germany) Simon Greul (second round)
8. (Belarus) Uladzimir Ignatik (second round)

== Draw ==
Key

- Q = Qualifier
- WC = Wild card
- LL = Lucky loser
- Alt = Alternate
- ITF = ITF entry
- PR = Protected ranking
- SR = Special ranking
- SE = Special exempt
- JE = Junior exempt
- JR = Junior Accelerator Programme entrant
- CO = College Accelerator Programme entrant
- NG = Next Gen Accelerator Program entrant
- w/o = Walkover
- r = Retired
- d = Defaulted

=== Finals ===
Semifinals
1	(Austria) Andreas Haider-Maurer	7^{7}	4	7^{7}
(Ukraine) Ivan Sergeyev	6^{2}	6	6^{4}
5	(Italy) Gianluca Naso	7^{7}	6
(Spain) Sergio Gutiérrez Ferrol	6^{4}	4

Final
1	(Austria) Andreas Haider-Maurer	4	5
5	(Italy) Gianluca Naso	6	7

=== Top half ===
First round
1	(Austria) A Haider-Maurer	6	7^{7}
(Spain) G Granollers	4	6^{2}
(Italy) S Galvani	2	2
Q	(Slovakia) Norbert Gomboš	6	6
WC	(Italy) Marco Cecchinato	6	6
(Italy) Enrico Burzi	2	2
WC	(Italy) Matteo Donati	3	3
6	(Switzerland) M Lammer	6	6
3	(Canada) P Polansky	4	1
(Italy) Andrea Arnaboldi	6	6
Q	(France) J Inzerillo	7	6
(Germany) K Krawietz	5	4
(Ukraine) I Sergeyev	6	6
(Italy) M Marrai	0	1
(Canada) S Diez	3	0
7	(Germany) S Greul	6	6

Second round
1	(Austria) A Haider-Maurer	3	6	6
Q	(Slovakia) Norbert Gomboš	6	3	2
WC	(Italy) Marco Cecchinato	4	6	2
6	(Switzerland) M Lammer	6	3	6
(Italy) Andrea Arnaboldi	7	3	2
Q	(France) J Inzerillo	5	6	6
(Ukraine) I Sergeyev	6	5	6
7	(Germany) S Greul	4	7	4

Quarterfinals
1	(Austria) A Haider-Maurer	6	6
6	(Switzerland) M Lammer	3	3
Q	(France) J Inzerillo	1	4
(Ukraine) I Sergeyev	6	6

Semifinals
1	(Austria) A Haider-Maurer	7^{7}	4	7^{7}
(Ukraine) I Sergeyev	6^{2}	6	6^{4}

=== Bottom half ===
First round
5	(Italy) G Naso	6	6
(Argentina) S Decoud	1	1
(France) Julien Obry	4	6	1
(France) F Martin	6	3	6
WC	(Italy) Stefano Napolitano	2	4
WC	(Italy) A di Mauro	6	6
(Slovakia) A Martin	6	6
4	(Germany) P Gojowczyk	3	3
8	(Belarus) U Ignatik	6	7
Q	(Colombia) Cristian Rodríguez	3	5
(Spain) S Gutiérrez Ferrol	7^{7}	6
(Czech Republic) J Minář	6^{3}	0
(Chile) H Podlipnik	6	2
(France) P-H Herbert	4	0^{r}
Q	(Australia) Dane Propoggia	6^{7}	1
2	(Spain) A Brugués Davi	7^{9}	6

Second round
5	(Italy) G Naso	7^{7}	4	6
(France) F Martin	6^{4}	6	3
WC	(Italy) A di Mauro	2	3
(Slovakia) A Martin	6	6
8	(Belarus) U Ignatik	6	1	6^{9}
(Spain) S Gutiérrez Ferrol	4	6	7^{11}
(Chile) H Podlipnik	6	6^{9}	1
2	(Spain) A Brugués Davi	1	7^{11}	6

Quarterfinals
5	(Italy) G Naso	6	7^{7}
(Slovakia) A Martin	4	6^{5}
(Spain) S Gutiérrez Ferrol	4	6	6
2	(Spain) A Brugués Davi	6	1	4

Semifinals
5	(Italy) G Naso	7^{7}	6
(Spain) S Gutiérrez Ferrol	6^{4}	4
