= 2023 Piemonte Open – Doubles =

Doubles
- 2023 Piemonte Open

Final
- Champions: (Kazakhstan) Andrey Golubev (Ukraine) Denys Molchanov
- Runners-up: (United States) Nathaniel Lammons (Australia) John Peers
- Score: 7–6^{(7–4)}, 6–7^{(6–8)}, [10–5]

Events
Singles	Doubles
- Piemonte Open

This was the first edition of the tournament.

Andrey Golubev and Denys Molchanov won the title after defeating Nathaniel Lammons and John Peers 7–6^{(7–4)}, 6–7^{(6–8)}, [10–5] in the final.

== Seeds ==
1. (United States) Nathaniel Lammons / (Australia) John Peers (final)
2. (Belgium) Sander Gillé / (Belgium) Joran Vliegen (quarterfinals)
3. (United Kingdom) Julian Cash / (United Kingdom) Henry Patten (first round)
4. (Serbia) Nikola Ćaćić / (Kazakhstan) Aleksandr Nedovyesov (semifinals)

== Draw ==
Key

- Q = Qualifier
- WC = Wild card
- LL = Lucky loser
- Alt = Alternate
- ITF = ITF entry
- PR = Protected ranking
- SR = Special ranking
- SE = Special exempt
- JE = Junior exempt
- JR = Junior Accelerator Programme entrant
- CO = College Accelerator Programme entrant
- NG = Next Gen Accelerator Program entrant
- w/o = Walkover
- r = Retired
- d = Defaulted

First round
1	(United States) N Lammons (Australia) J Peers	7^{7}	6
(Colombia) N Barrientos (Netherlands) D Pel	6^{5}	2
(Italy) M Bortolotti (Spain) S Martos Gornés	7	3	[3]
(Czech Republic) R Jebavý (Austria) P Oswald	5	6	[10]
4	(Serbia) N Ćaćić (Kazakhstan) A Nedovyesov	5	7^{7}	[10]
WC	(Italy) F Cobolli (Italy) G Zeppieri	7	6^{4}	[6]
(Romania) VV Cornea (Venezuela) LD Martínez	6	3	[10]
(India) S Balaji (India) J Nedunchezhiyan	4	6	[7]
(Netherlands) S Arends (Greece) Pe Tsitsipas	3	4
(Argentina) S Báez (Brazil) T Seyboth Wild	6	6
(Kazakhstan) A Golubev (Ukraine) D Molchanov	7^{7}	5	[10]
3	(United Kingdom) J Cash (United Kingdom) H Patten	6^{2}	7	[8]
(Uruguay) A Behar (Czech Republic) A Pavlásek	6	6
WC	(Italy) Edoardo Lavagno (Italy) G Piraino	1	4
(Serbia) I Sabanov (Serbia) M Sabanov	6^{8}	3
2	(Belgium) S Gillé (Belgium) J Vliegen	7^{10}	6

Quarterfinals
1	(United States) N Lammons (Australia) J Peers	6	7
(Czech Republic) R Jebavý (Austria) P Oswald	4	5
4	(Serbia) N Ćaćić (Kazakhstan) A Nedovyesov	7^{7}	6
(Romania) VV Cornea (Venezuela) LD Martínez	6^{3}	4
(Argentina) S Báez (Brazil) T Seyboth Wild
(Kazakhstan) A Golubev (Ukraine) D Molchanov	w/o
(Uruguay) A Behar (Czech Republic) A Pavlásek	6	3	[10]
2	(Belgium) S Gillé (Belgium) J Vliegen	4	6	[2]

Semifinals
1	(United States) N Lammons (Australia) J Peers	6	6
4	(Serbia) N Ćaćić (Kazakhstan) A Nedovyesov	3	2
(Kazakhstan) A Golubev (Ukraine) D Molchanov	6	5	[10]
(Uruguay) A Behar (Czech Republic) A Pavlásek	4	7	[5]

Final
1	(United States) N Lammons (Australia) J Peers	6^{4}	7^{8}	[5]
(Kazakhstan) A Golubev (Ukraine) D Molchanov	7^{7}	6^{6}	[10]
