= 2012 Carisap Tennis Cup – Doubles =

Doubles
- 2012 Carisap Tennis Cup

Final
- Champions: (Australia) Brydan Klein (Australia) Dane Propoggia
- Runners-up: (Italy) Stefano Ianni (Italy) Gianluca Naso
- Score: 3–6, 6–4, [12–10]

Events
Singles	Doubles
← 2011 ·	Carisap Tennis Cup	· 2013 →

Alessio di Mauro and Alessandro Motti were the defending champions but Motti decided not to participate.
di Mauro played alongside Andrea Arnaboldi but lost in the semifinals.
Brydan Klein and Dane Propoggia won the final 3–6, 6–4, [12–10] against Stefano Ianni and Gianluca Naso.

== Seeds ==
1. (Italy) Stefano Ianni / (Italy) Gianluca Naso
2. (France) ~~Pierre-Hugues Herbert / (Germany) Kevin Krawietz~~ (withdrew)
3. (Australia) Brydan Klein / (Australia) Dane Propoggia
4. (Republic of Ireland) James Cluskey / (France) Fabrice Martin (first round)

== Draw ==
=== Key ===
- Q = Qualifier
- WC = Wild card
- LL = Lucky loser
- Alt = Alternate
- SE = Special exempt
- PR = Protected ranking
- ITF = ITF entry
- JE = Junior exempt
- w/o = Walkover
- r = Retired
- d = Defaulted
- SR = Special ranking

=== Draw ===
First round
1	(Italy) S Ianni (Italy) G Naso	6	6
(Italy) Lorenzo Giustino (France) Julien Obry	3	4
(Italy) S Galvani (Italy) Stefano Napolitano	6	6
WC	(Portugal) Gonçalo Pereira (Italy) Federico Torresi	4	3
4	(Republic of Ireland) James Cluskey (France) F Martin	1	1
(Italy) Andrea Arnaboldi (Italy) A di Mauro	6	6
(Spain) A Brugués-Davi (Canada) S Diez	7	6^{6}	[11]
(Spain) Jordi Marsé-Vidri (Spain) C Poch-Gradin	5	7^{8}	[9]
WC	(Colombia) Cristian Rodríguez (Italy) Marco Viola	6	3	[10]
WC	(Italy) Daniele Chiurulli (Italy) Lorenzo Papasidero	2	6	[3]
(Italy) Enrico Burzi (Italy) Marco Cecchinato	3	2
3	(Australia) B Klein (Australia) D Propoggia	6	6
(Spain) S Gutiérrez Ferrol (Netherlands) Mark Vervoort	6	7
(Slovakia) A Martin (Chile) H Podlipnik	3	5
(Spain) G Granollers (Canada) P Polansky	4	6	[11]
Alt	(Russia) Egor Kovalev (Russia) Alexander Lobkov	6	1	[13]

Quarterfinals
1	(Italy) S Ianni (Italy) G Naso	6	6
(Italy) S Galvani (Italy) Stefano Napolitano	4	4
(Italy) Andrea Arnaboldi (Italy) A di Mauro	6	6
(Spain) A Brugués-Davi (Canada) S Diez	4	3
WC	(Colombia) Cristian Rodríguez (Italy) Marco Viola	3	3
3	(Australia) B Klein (Australia) D Propoggia	6	6
(Spain) S Gutiérrez Ferrol (Netherlands) Mark Vervoort	7^{7}	6
Alt	(Russia) Egor Kovalev (Russia) Alexander Lobkov	6^{5}	1

Semifinals
1	(Italy) S Ianni (Italy) G Naso	7	6
(Italy) Andrea Arnaboldi (Italy) A di Mauro	5	3
3	(Australia) B Klein (Australia) D Propoggia	6	7^{7}
(Spain) S Gutiérrez Ferrol (Netherlands) Mark Vervoort	4	6^{2}

Final
1	(Italy) S Ianni (Italy) G Naso	6	4	[10]
3	(Australia) B Klein (Australia) D Propoggia	3	6	[12]
