= 2012 Carisap Tennis Cup =

- Date: 9–15 July
- Edition: 8th
- Surface: Clay
- Location: San Benedetto del Tronto, Italy

Champions

Singles
- (Italy) Gianluca Naso

Doubles
- (Australia) Brydan Klein / (Australia) Dane Propoggia
← 2011 ·	ATP Challenger San Benedetto	· 2013 →

The 2012 Carisap Tennis Cup was a professional tennis tournament played on clay courts. It was the eighth edition of the tournament which was part of the 2012 ATP Challenger Tour. It took place in San Benedetto del Tronto, Italy between 9 and 15 July 2012.

== Singles main draw entrants ==
=== Seeds ===
Country	Player	Rank^{1}	Seed
AUT	Andreas Haider-Maurer	163	1
ESP	Arnau Brugués-Davi	166	2
CAN	Peter Polansky	179	3
GER	Peter Gojowczyk	183	4
ITA	Gianluca Naso	229	5
SUI	Michael Lammer	239	6
GER	Simon Greul	245	7
BLR	Uladzimir Ignatik	247	8

- ^{1} Rankings are as of June 25, 2012.

=== Other entrants ===
The following players received wildcards into the singles main draw:

- (Italy) Marco Cecchinato
- (Italy) Alessio di Mauro
- (Italy) Matteo Donati
- (Italy) Stefano Napolitano

The following players received entry from the qualifying draw:

- (Slovakia) Norbert Gomboš
- (France) Jérôme Inzerillo
- (Australia) Dane Propoggia
- (Colombia) Cristian Rodríguez

== Champions ==
=== Singles ===
- (Italy) Gianluca Naso def. (Austria) Andreas Haider-Maurer, 6–4, 7–5

=== Doubles ===
- (Australia) Brydan Klein / (Australia) Dane Propoggia def. (Italy) Stefano Ianni / (Italy) Gianluca Naso, 3–6, 6–4, [12–10]
