= 2023 Piemonte Open – Singles =

Singles
- 2023 Piemonte Open

Final
- Champion: (Germany) Dominik Koepfer
- Runner-up: (Italy) Federico Gaio
- Score: 6–7^{(5–7)}, 6–2, 6–0

Events
Singles	Doubles
- Piemonte Open

This was the first edition of the tournament.

Dominik Koepfer won the title after defeating Federico Gaio 6–7^{(5–7)}, 6–2, 6–0 in the final.

== Seeds ==
The top four seeds received a bye into the second round.

1. (Argentina) Sebastián Báez (semifinals)
2. (Colombia) Daniel Elahi Galán (semifinals)
3. (Peru) Juan Pablo Varillas (second round)
4. (Argentina) Juan Manuel Cerúndolo (second round)
5. (Japan) Taro Daniel (second round)
6. (Japan) Yosuke Watanuki (first round)
7. (United States) Aleksandar Kovacevic (first round)
8. (Germany) Oscar Otte (first round)

== Draw ==
Key

- Q = Qualifier
- WC = Wild card
- LL = Lucky loser
- Alt = Alternate
- ITF = ITF entry
- PR = Protected ranking
- SR = Special ranking
- SE = Special exempt
- JE = Junior exempt
- JR = Junior Accelerator Programme entrant
- CO = College Accelerator Programme entrant
- NG = Next Gen Accelerator Program entrant
- w/o = Walkover
- r = Retired
- d = Defaulted

=== Finals ===
Semifinals
1	(Argentina) Sebastián Báez	5	3
Q	(Italy) Federico Gaio	7	6
Alt	(Germany) Dominik Koepfer	6	6
2	(Colombia) Daniel Elahi Galán	4	2

Final
Q	(Italy) Federico Gaio	7^{7}	2	0
Alt	(Germany) Dominik Koepfer	6^{5}	6	6

=== Top half ===
First round
Alt	(Italy) R Bonadio	6	6
WC	(Italy) G Piraino	4	3
Alt	(Brazil) T Seyboth Wild	6	6
Alt	(Italy) F Passaro	2	0
Alt	(Netherlands) G Brouwer	4	4
5/Alt	(Japan) T Daniel	6	6
Alt	(Czech Republic) T Macháč	6	5	1
Alt	(Argentina) A Collarini	4	7	6
Alt	(Bosnia and Herzegovina) N Fatić	6	3	4
Alt	(Argentina) C Ugo Carabelli	4	6	6
Q	(Italy) F Gaio	6	7
8	(Germany) O Otte	4	5

Second round
1	(Argentina) S Báez	6	6
Alt	(Italy) R Bonadio	4	2
Alt	(Brazil) T Seyboth Wild	3	7^{7}	6
5/Alt	(Japan) T Daniel	6	6^{3}	2
4	(Argentina) JM Cerúndolo	5	4
Alt	(Argentina) A Collarini	7	6
Alt	(Argentina) C Ugo Carabelli	1	6	2^{r}
Q	(Italy) F Gaio	6	4	5

Quarterfinals
1	(Argentina) S Báez	6	3	6
Alt	(Brazil) T Seyboth Wild	4	6	3
Alt	(Argentina) A Collarini	4	3
Q	(Italy) F Gaio	6	6

Semifinals
1	(Argentina) S Báez	5	3
Q	(Italy) F Gaio	7	6

=== Bottom half ===
First round
6/Alt	(Japan) Y Watanuki	6	3	4
Q	(Italy) S Caruso	2	6	6
WC	(Italy) Edoardo Lavagno	7	6
Alt	(Italy) L Darderi	5	3
Alt	(Germany) D Koepfer	6	6
Alt	(Italy) G Zeppieri	2	2
7/Alt	(United States) A Kovacevic	1	6^{9}
LL	(Italy) G Mager	6	7^{11}
Q	(Ukraine) Aleksandr Braynin	3	3
WC	(Italy) F Cobolli	6	6
Alt	(Finland) O Virtanen	1	7	4
Q	(Italy) S Napolitano	6	5	6

Second round
Q	(Italy) S Caruso	4	1
WC	(Italy) E Lavagno	6	6
Alt	(Germany) D Koepfer	6	5	7
3	(Peru) JP Varillas	4	7	5
LL	(Italy) G Mager	7	2	6^{5}
WC	(Italy) F Cobolli	5	6	7^{7}
Q	(Italy) S Napolitano	2	1
2	(Colombia) DE Galán	6	6

Quarterfinals
WC	(Italy) E Lavagno	3	1
Alt	(Germany) D Koepfer	6	6
WC	(Italy) F Cobolli	4	5
2	(Colombia) DE Galán	6	7

Semifinals
Alt	(Germany) D Koepfer	6	6
2	(Colombia) DE Galán	4	2
