= 2023 Piemonte Open =

- Date: 15 – 20 May
- Edition: 1st
- Surface: Clay; Hard (SF & F only)
- Location: Turin, Italy

Champions

Singles
- (Germany) Dominik Koepfer

Doubles
- (Kazakhstan) Andrey Golubev / (Ukraine) Denys Molchanov
- Piemonte Open

The 2023 Piemonte Open was a professional tennis tournament played on clay courts (from Round 1 to the quarterfinals, after which weather forced the tournament to be completed on indoor hard courts).

It was the 1st edition of the tournament and part of the 2023 ATP Challenger Tour. It took place in Turin, Italy between 15 and 20 May 2023.

== Singles main-draw entrants ==
=== Seeds ===
Country	Player	Rank^{1}	Seed
ARG	Sebastián Báez	40	1
COL	Daniel Elahi Galán	94	2
PER	Juan Pablo Varillas	97	3
ARG	Juan Manuel Cerúndolo	105	4
JPN	Taro Daniel	109	5
JPN	Yosuke Watanuki	111	6
USA	Aleksandar Kovacevic	113	7
GER	Oscar Otte	114	8

- ^{1} Rankings are as of 8 May 2023.

=== Other entrants ===
The following players received wildcards into the singles main draw:

- (Italy) Flavio Cobolli
- (Italy) Edoardo Lavagno
- (Italy) Gabriele Piraino

The following players received entry into the singles main draw as alternates:

- (Italy) Riccardo Bonadio
- (Netherlands) Gijs Brouwer
- (Argentina) Andrea Collarini
- (Japan) Taro Daniel
- (Italy) Luciano Darderi
- (Bosnia and Herzegovina) Nerman Fatić
- (Germany) Dominik Koepfer
- (United States) Aleksandar Kovacevic
- (Czech Republic) Tomáš Macháč
- (Italy) Francesco Passaro
- (Brazil) Thiago Seyboth Wild
- (Kazakhstan) ~~Timofey Skatov~~
- (Argentina) Camilo Ugo Carabelli
- (Finland) Otto Virtanen
- (Japan) Yosuke Watanuki
- (Italy) Giulio Zeppieri

The following players received entry from the qualifying draw:

- (Ukraine) Aleksandr Braynin
- (Italy) Salvatore Caruso
- (Italy) Federico Gaio
- (Italy) Stefano Napolitano

The following player received entry as a lucky loser:

- (Italy) Gianluca Mager

== Champions ==
=== Singles ===
- (Germany) Dominik Koepfer def. (Italy) Federico Gaio 6–7^{(5–7)}, 6–2, 6–0.

=== Doubles ===
- (Kazakhstan) Andrey Golubev / (Ukraine) Denys Molchanov def. (United States) Nathaniel Lammons / (Australia) John Peers 7–6^{(7–4)}, 6–7^{(6–8)}, [10–5].
