= 2011 Carisap Tennis Cup – Singles =

Singles
- 2011 Carisap Tennis Cup

Final
- Champion: (Romania) Adrian Ungur
- Runner-up: (Italy) Stefano Galvani
- Score: 7–5, 6–2

Events
Singles	Doubles
- Carisap Tennis Cup

Carlos Berlocq was the defending champion, but Simone Vagnozzi eliminated him in the second round.

Adrian Ungur defeated Stefano Galvani 7–5, 6–2 in the final to win the tournament.

== Seeds ==
1. (Argentina) Carlos Berlocq (second round)
2. (Spain) Pere Riba (semifinals)
3. (Italy) Filippo Volandri (first round)
4. (Argentina) Máximo González (first round)
5. (Argentina) Diego Junqueira (first round)
6. (France) Benoît Paire (quarterfinals)
7. (Italy) Paolo Lorenzi (semifinals)
8. (Italy) Alessio di Mauro (quarterfinals)

== Draw ==
Key

- Q = Qualifier
- WC = Wild card
- LL = Lucky loser
- Alt = Alternate
- ITF = ITF entry
- PR = Protected ranking
- SR = Special ranking
- SE = Special exempt
- JE = Junior exempt
- JR = Junior Accelerator Programme entrant
- CO = College Accelerator Programme entrant
- NG = Next Gen Accelerator Program entrant
- w/o = Walkover
- r = Retired
- d = Defaulted

=== Finals ===
Semifinals
7	(Italy) Paolo Lorenzi	6^{1}	3
(Italy) Stefano Galvani	7^{7}	6
(Romania) Adrian Ungur	6	7
2	(Spain) Pere Riba	1	5

Final
(Italy) Stefano Galvani	5	2
(Romania) Adrian Ungur	7	6

=== Top half ===
First round
1	(Argentina) C Berlocq	6	6
WC	(Canada) S Diez	3	0
(Italy) S Vagnozzi	6	6
Q	(Slovenia) Janez Semrajc	2	4
(Argentina) JP Brzezicki	6	6
(Argentina) P Galdón	1	1
(Slovakia) A Martin	7^{7}	5	6^{3}
7	(Italy) P Lorenzi	6^{5}	7	7^{7}
4	(Argentina) M González	4	3
SE	(Italy) A Giannessi	6	6
(Italy) M Viola	4	6	7^{7}
(France) R Jouan	6	0	6^{4}
(Italy) S Galvani	6	6
Q	(Austria) N Moser	3	3
(Moldova) R Albot	7	6
5	(Argentina) D Junqueira	5	3

Second round
1	(Argentina) C Berlocq	2	6^{5}
(Italy) S Vagnozzi	6	7^{7}
(Argentina) JP Brzezicki	3	6	5
7	(Italy) P Lorenzi	6	3	7
SE	(Italy) A Giannessi	6	7
(Italy) M Viola	4	5
(Italy) S Galvani	6	6
(Moldova) R Albot	4	2

Quarterfinals
(Italy) S Vagnozzi	7	4	1
7	(Italy) P Lorenzi	5	6	6
SE	(Italy) A Giannessi	4	1	r
(Italy) S Galvani	6	3

Semifinals
7	(Italy) P Lorenzi	6^{1}	3
(Italy) S Galvani	7^{7}	6

=== Bottom half ===
First round
8	(Italy) A di Mauro	6	6
WC	(Italy) Stefano Travaglia	1	3
WC	(Italy) D Giorgini	6	6
(Serbia) B Pašanski	4	2
(France) J Eysseric	4	2
(Italy) G Naso	6	6
(Romania) A Ungur	6	1	6
3/WC	(Italy) F Volandri	0	6	4
6	(France) B Paire	7^{7}	6
Q	(Austria) M Raditschnigg	6^{4}	4
(Argentina) Marco Trungelliti	6^{5}	7	5
(Croatia) N Mektić	7^{7}	5	7
(Italy) A Brizzi	6	6
(Serbia) D Lajović	2	2
Q	(Italy) M Trevisan	4	6	6^{3}
2	(Spain) P Riba	6	3	7^{7}

Second round
8	(Italy) A di Mauro	6	2	6
WC	(Italy) D Giorgini	3	6	4
(Italy) G Naso	2	2
(Romania) A Ungur	6	6
6	(France) B Paire	4	6	6
(Croatia) N Mektić	6	3	2
(Italy) A Brizzi	3	3
2	(Spain) P Riba	6	6

Quarterfinals
8	(Italy) A di Mauro	6^{3}	6^{1}
(Romania) A Ungur	7^{7}	7^{7}
6	(France) B Paire	6^{3}	6^{4}
2	(Spain) P Riba	7^{7}	7^{7}

Semifinals
(Romania) A Ungur	6	7
2	(Spain) P Riba	1	5
