= 2011 Carisap Tennis Cup – Doubles =

Doubles
- 2011 Carisap Tennis Cup

Final
- Champions: (Italy) Alessio di Mauro (Italy) Alessandro Motti
- Runners-up: (Italy) Daniele Giorgini (Italy) Stefano Travaglia
- Score: 7–6^{(7–5)}, 4–6, [10–7]

Events
| Singles | Doubles |
| ← 2010 · | Carisap Tennis Cup | · 2012 → |

Thomas Fabbiano and Gabriel Trujillo-Soler were the defending champions but decided not to participate.

Alessio di Mauro and Alessandro Motti won the title, defeating Daniele Giorgini and Stefano Travaglia 7–6^{(7–5)}, 4–6, [10–7] in the final.

== Seeds ==
1. (Italy) Alessio di Mauro / (Italy) Alessandro Motti (champions)
2. (Austria) Nikolaus Moser / (Austria) Max Raditschnigg (semifinals)
3. (Italy) Alessandro Giannessi / (Italy) Matteo Viola (quarterfinals)
4. (Canada) Steven Diez / (Spain) Pere Riba (quarterfinals, withdrew)

== Draw ==
=== Key ===
- Q = Qualifier
- WC = Wild card
- LL = Lucky loser
- Alt = Alternate
- SE = Special exempt
- PR = Protected ranking
- ITF = ITF entry
- JE = Junior exempt
- w/o = Walkover
- r = Retired
- d = Defaulted
- SR = Special ranking

=== Draw ===
First round
(Italy) M Trevisan (Romania) A Ungur | 5 | 0
(Italy) A Brizzi (Italy) S Galvani | 7 | 6
3 | (Italy) A Giannessi (Italy) M Viola | 7 | 6
WC | (Italy) Andrea Attrice (Italy) Piercarlo Coccio | 5 | 1
(Serbia) D Lajović (Slovakia) A Martin | 6 | 6
(France) R Jouan (Portugal) Gonçalo Pereira | 3 | 3
(Italy) Enrico Burzi (Italy) G Naso | 6 | 5 | [7]
(Italy) D Giorgini (Italy) Stefano Travaglia | 3 | 7 | [10]
(Argentina) P Galdón (Argentina) Marco Trungelliti | 7^{7} | 3 | [0]
4 | (Canada) S Diez (Spain) P Riba | 6^{1} | 6 | [10]
WC | (Italy) Enrico Becuzzi (Italy) P Lorenzi
(Portugal) B Mota (Portugal) P Sousa | w/o

Quarterfinals
1 | (Italy) A di Mauro (Italy) A Motti | 6 | 6
(Italy) A Brizzi (Italy) S Galvani | 4 | 4
3 | (Italy) A Giannessi (Italy) M Viola | 3 | 1
(Serbia) D Lajović (Slovakia) A Martin | 6 | 6
(Italy) D Giorgini (Italy) Stefano Travaglia
4 | (Canada) S Diez (Spain) P Riba | w/o
WC | (Italy) Enrico Becuzzi (Italy) P Lorenzi | 3 | 0
2 | (Austria) N Moser (Austria) M Raditschnigg | 6 | 6

Semifinals
1 | (Italy) A di Mauro (Italy) A Motti | 6 | 6
(Serbia) D Lajović (Slovakia) A Martin | 1 | 1
(Italy) D Giorgini (Italy) Stefano Travaglia | 6 | 7^{7}
2 | (Austria) N Moser (Austria) M Raditschnigg | 3 | 6^{3}

Final
1 | (Italy) A di Mauro (Italy) A Motti | 7^{7} | 4 | [10]
(Italy) D Giorgini (Italy) Stefano Travaglia | 6^{5} | 6 | [7]
