= Dominik Koepfer =

German tennis player (born 1994)

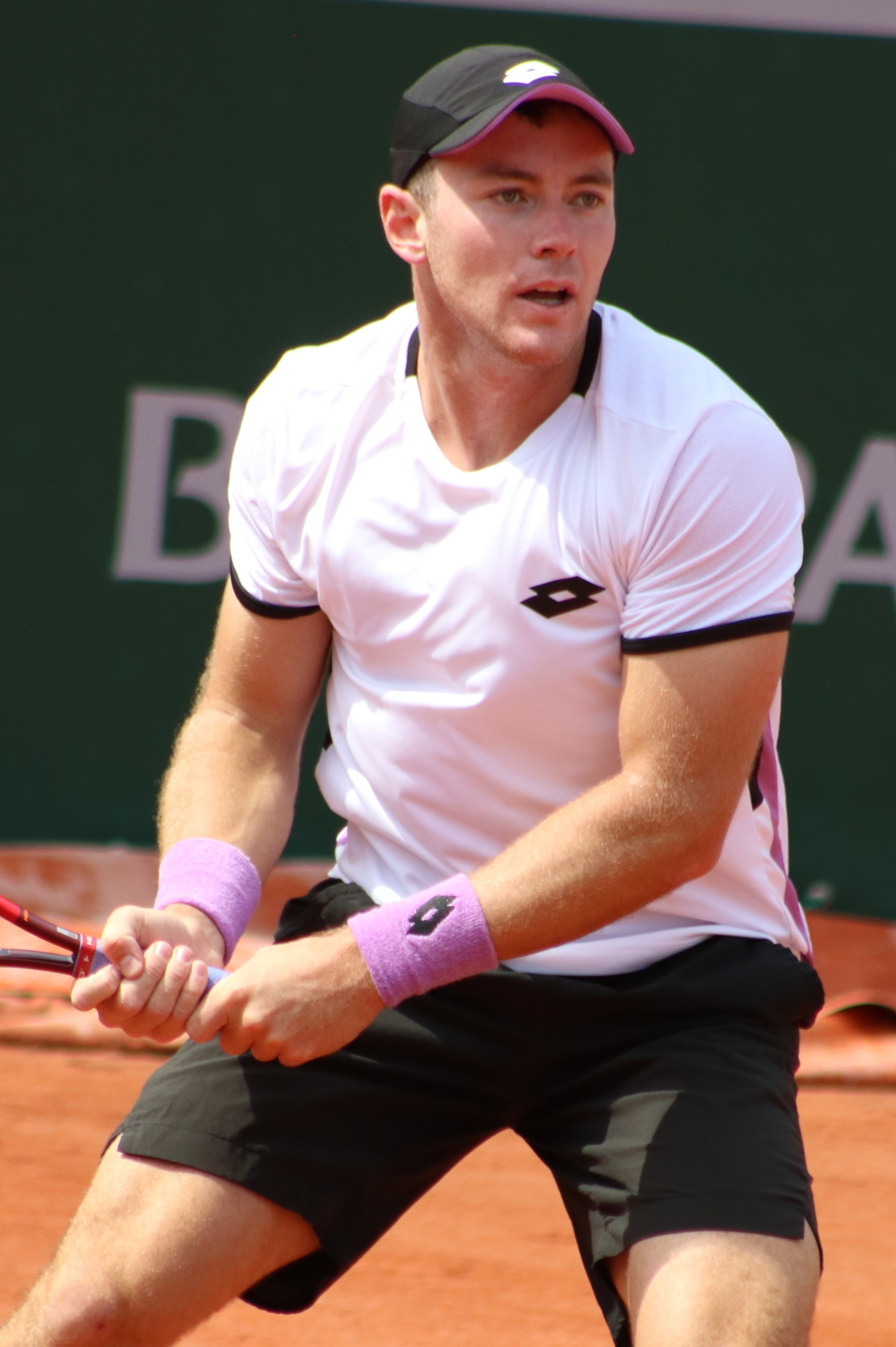
- Koepfer at the 2021 French Open
- Country (sports): Germany
- Residence: Tampa, United States
- Born: 29 April 1994 (age 32) Furtwangen, Germany
- Height: 1.80 m (5 ft 11 in)
- Turned pro: 2016
- Plays: Left-handed (two-handed backhand)
- College: Tulane
- Coach: Rhyne Williams, Billy Heiser
- Prize money: US $3,641,907

Singles
- Career record: 61–75
- Career titles: 0
- Highest ranking: No. 49 (4 March 2023)

Grand Slam singles results
- Australian Open: 2R (2021, 2022)
- French Open: 3R (2021)
- Wimbledon: 3R (2021)
- US Open: 4R (2019)

Other tournaments
- Olympic Games: 3R (2021, 2024)

Doubles
- Career record: 32–25
- Career titles: 0
- Highest ranking: No. 69 (24 June 2024)

Grand Slam doubles results
- Australian Open: SF (2024)
- French Open: 2R (2021, 2024)
- Wimbledon: 2R (2021)
- US Open: 3R (2021)

Other doubles tournaments
- Olympic Games: QF (2024)

Team competitions
- Davis Cup: SF (2021)

Dominik Koepfer (born 29 April 1994), also spelled Köpfer, is a German inactive professional tennis player. He achieved a career-high ATP singles ranking of world No. 49 on 4 March 2024 and a doubles ranking of No. 69 on 24 June 2024. He played college tennis at Tulane University.

== Professional career ==
=== 2017-2018: ATP debut, First ATP win ===
Koepfer made his ATP main draw debut at the 2017 Winston-Salem Open as a lucky loser. He won his first ATP Challenger Tour title in doubles at the Columbus Challenger, partnering Denis Kudla.

Koepfer won his first match on the ATP Tour, again as a lucky loser at the 2018 Winston-Salem Open, defeating Tennys Sandgren.

=== 2019: First Challenger title, Major debut and fourth round, top 100 ===
After winning his maiden Challenger title in singles at the Ilkley Trophy, Koepfer earned a wild card into the Wimbledon Championships. There, he won his first Grand Slam main draw match by defeating Filip Krajinović in the first round before losing to Diego Schwartzman in straight sets.

As a qualifier at the US Open, Koepfer defeated 17th seed Nikoloz Basilashvili in the third round, before losing to eventual finalist Daniil Medvedev in four sets in the fourth round. As a result he reached the top 100 at world No. 86 on 9 September 2019.

=== 2020: First Top-10 win, Masters quarterfinal ===
Koepfer reached his first ATP Tour Masters 1000 quarterfinal at the Italian Open, defeating Gael Monfils en route for his first top-10 win before losing to eventual champion Novak Djokovic in three sets.

He reached the second round of the French Open for the first time, losing to Stan Wawrinka in four sets.

=== 2021: Top 50, two major third rounds ===
Koepfer started his season at the first edition of the Great Ocean Road Open. He lost in the first round to Australian Christopher O'Connell. At the Australian Open, he was defeated in the second round by third seed and last year finalist, Dominic Thiem.

Seeded sixth at the Córdoba Open, Koepfer was eliminated in the first round by Federico Coria. In Buenos Aires, he fell in the second round to fifth seed Albert Ramos Viñolas. At the Mexican Open, he reached his first ATP tour semifinal beating Mexican wildcard Gerardo López Villaseñor, fourth seed Milos Raonic, and Cameron Norrie. He ended up losing to second seed, compatriot, and eventual champion, Alexander Zverev. With this result, Koepfer climbed into the top 60 in the rankings to a career-high of No. 54 in singles on 22 March 2021. At the Miami Open, he was beaten in the first round by Hugo Gaston.

Koepfer began the clay-court season at the Monte-Carlo Masters. Getting past qualifying, he lost in the first round to fellow qualifier Marco Cecchinato. Next, he competed at the Barcelona Open. He was defeated in the first round by fellow leftie Corentin Moutet. Playing in Munich, he was eliminated in the second round by seventh seed, compatriot, and eventual finalist Jan-Lennard Struff. At the Madrid Open, despite a second-round loss to 16th seed Cristian Garín, he reached the top 50 following the tournament on 10 May 2021. His final tournament before the second Major of the year was the Geneva Open where he upset seventh seed Benoît Paire in a three-set victory. He ended up losing in the quarterfinals to third seed and eventual champion, Casper Ruud. At the French Open, he reached the third round for the first time and was defeated by eighth seed, former world number one, and 2009 champion Roger Federer.

Koepfer opened his grass-court season at the Stuttgart Open. He lost in the first round to Jurij Rodionov. In Halle, he faced third seed Alexander Zverev in the first round. He pushed Zverev to three sets but ended up losing the match. At Wimbledon, he made it to the third round for the first time where he fell to eighth seed Roberto Bautista Agut.

After Wimbledon, Koepfer played at the Hamburg Open. He was eliminated in the second round by top seed Stefanos Tsitsipas. Representing Germany at the Summer Olympics, he reached the third round and lost to sixth seed and eventual bronze medalist, Pablo Carreño Busta.

Starting his US Open preparation at the Canadian Open, Koepfer was defeated in the first round of qualifying by Canadian wildcard Peter Polansky. In Cincinnati, he fell in the final round of qualifying to Marcos Giron before earning a spot in the main draw as a lucky lower. He was defeated in the second round by seventh seed Pablo Carreño Busta. Seeded 16th at the Winston-Salem Open, he reached the third round where he was beaten by top seed Carreño Busta. At the US Open, he lost in the second round to second seed and eventual champion, Daniil Medvedev.

Competing at the first edition of the San Diego Open, Koepfer was defeated in the first round by eventual finalist Cameron Norrie. At the Indian Wells Masters, he fell in the first round to Emil Ruusuvuori in three sets. In Vienna, he was eliminated in the final round of qualifying by Gianluca Mager. Entering the main draw as a lucky loser, he lost in the first round to Lorenzo Sonego. In Paris, he lost in the final round of qualifying to Miomir Kecmanović but due to the withdrawal of Jenson Brooksby, he entered the main draw as a lucky loser and defeated Andy Murray in the first round, saving seven match points. His victory was named one of the top-5 comebacks of the 2021 season. In the second round, he upset ninth seed Félix Auger-Aliassime. With this win, he ended the Canadian's hopes of qualifying for the ATP finals. In the third round, he lost to seventh seed Hubert Hurkacz in three sets.

=== 2022: Loss of form, out of clay season and of top 200 ===
At the Australian Open, Koepfer defeated Carlos Taberner before losing to 23rd seed Reilly Opelka in the second round. Due to an ongoing arm injury, he decided to skip the entire clay season. As a result, his ranking plummeted to No. 149 on 18 July 2022, out of the top 150 at No. 159 on 22 August 2022, and out of the top 250 at No. 259 on 7 November 2022.

Following his title at the Calgary National Bank Challenger, he returned to the top 200 at world No. 195 climbing 64 positions up in the rankings on 14 November 2022 only to drop again to No. 202 on 28 November 2022.

=== 2023: Two Challenger titles, back to top 100, ATP doubles final ===
Ranked No. 262, Koepfer won his third Challenger at the Mexico City Open and returned to the top 200 at world No. 179 up more than 80 positions in the rankings. The following week, he reached a second final at the San Luis Open Challenger. As a result, he moved another 25 positions into the top 155. He also made the final at the 2023 Prague Open and reached the top 150 on 8 May 2023. Koepfer won his fourth Challenger title at the Challenger 175 at the Piemonte Open in Turin as an alternate and moved close to 50 positions up, a couple of positions shy of the top 100 on 22 May 2023.

Koepfer reached the semifinals at the Los Cabos Open where he lost to fifth seed Alex de Minaur. At the same tournament, he also reached his maiden ATP final with Andrew Harris. At the 2023 US Open Koepfer lost to world No. 1 and defending champion Carlos Alcaraz after retiring due to injury, having rolled his ankle.

=== 2024-2025: Major doubles semifinals, Masters fourth round, injury, hiatus ===
He won his fifth Challenger at the 2024 Canberra Tennis International.

He then competed in the 2024 Australian Open, beginning his campaign against fellow compatriot and sixth seed Alexander Zverev, falling in four tight sets. In doubles, alongside his compatriot Yannick Hanfmann he reached the semifinals as an unseeded pair, before losing to Italian duo Simone Bolelli and Andrea Vavassori.

At the 2024 Dallas Open he reached the quarterfinals defeating Aleksandar Kovacevic and Rinky Hijikata. He lost to eventual champion Tommy Paul. He reached a second quarterfinal for the season at the 2024 Abierto Mexicano Telcel in Acapulco, defeating qualifier Térence Atmane and eight seed Frances Tiafoe. He lost to second seed Holger Rune. He reached a new career-high ranking of No. 49 on 4 March 2024. At the 2024 Miami Open, he defeated Marcos Giron, 18th seed Sebastián Báez and 14th seed Ugo Humbert to reach the fourth round of a Masters for the second time, recording his first wins at this tournament before losing to Daniil Medvedev.

== Performance timelines ==
Key
W	F	SF	QF	#R	RR	Q#	P#	DNQ	A	Z#	PO	G	S	B	NMS	NTI	P	NH

(W) winner; (F) finalist; (SF) semifinalist; (QF) quarterfinalist; (#R) rounds 4, 3, 2, 1; (RR) round-robin stage; (Q#) qualification round; (DNQ) did not qualify; (A) absent; (NH) not held; (SR) strike rate (events won / competed); (W–L) win–loss record.
To avoid confusion and double counting, these charts are updated at the conclusion of a tournament or when the player's participation has ended.

=== Singles ===
Current through the 2026 ATP Tour.

Tournament	2017	2018	2019	2020	2021	2022	2023	2024	2025	2026	SR	W–L	Win %
Grand Slam tournaments
Australian Open	A	A	Q2	1R	2R	2R	A	1R	1R	A	0 / 5	2–5	29%
French Open	A	A	Q2	2R	3R	A	Q3	1R	A	A	0 / 3	3–3	50%
Wimbledon	A	Q3	2R	NH	3R	1R	1R	A	A	A	0 / 4	3–4	43%
US Open	A	A	4R	1R	2R	Q1	1R	1R	A	A	0 / 5	4–5	44%
Win–loss	0–0	0–0	4–2	1–3	6–4	1–2	0–2	0–3	0–1	0–0	0 / 17	12–17	41%
National representation
Summer Olympics	NH				3R	NH		3R	NH		0 / 2	4–2	67%
Davis Cup	A	A	A	QR	SF	A	A	QR	A	A	0 / 1	3–2	60%
ATP 1000 tournaments
Indian Wells Open	A	A	A	NH	1R	2R	A	1R	A	A	0 / 3	1–3	25%
Miami Open	A	A	A	NH	1R	1R	A	4R	A	A	0 / 3	3–3	50%
Monte-Carlo Masters	A	A	A	NH	1R	A	A	1R	A	A	0 / 2	0–2	0%
Madrid Open	A	A	A	NH	2R	A	A	1R	A	A	0 / 2	1–2	33%
Italian Open	A	A	A	QF	A	A	A	3R	A	A	0 / 2	5–2	71%
Canadian Open	A	A	A	NH	Q1	A	A	A	A	A	0 / 0	0–0	–
Cincinnati Open	A	A	A	Q2	2R	A	A	A	A	A	0 / 1	1–1	50%
Shanghai Masters	A	A	Q2	NH			A	A	A	A	0 / 0	0–0	–
Paris Masters	A	A	A	A	3R	A	Q1	A	A	A	0 / 1	2–1	67%
Win–loss	0–0	0–0	0–0	3–1	4–6	1–2	0–0	5–5	0–0	0–0	0 / 14	13–14	48%
Career statistics
	2017	2018	2019	2020	2021	2022	2023	2024	2025	2026	Career		
Tournaments	1	2	4	6	24	9	6	19	2	0	Career total: 73		
Hard win–loss	0–1	1–1	3–3	2–3	12–14	3–6	7–5	8–8	1–2	0–0	0 / 41	37–43	46%
Clay win–loss	0–0	0–1	0–0	5–3	8–9	0–0	0–0	6–9	0–0	0–0	0 / 22	19–22	46%
Grass win–loss	0–0	0–0	1–1	0–0	2–3	0–3	0–1	2–2	0–0	0–0	0 / 10	5–10	33%
Overall win–loss	0–1	1–2	4–4	7–6	22–26	3–9	7–6	16–19	1–2	0–0	0 / 73	61–75	45%
Win %	0%	33%	50%	54%	46%	25%	54%	46%	33%	–	Career total: 45%		
Year-end ranking	305	161	94	66	54	201	77	102	509	–			

=== Doubles ===
Tournament	2019	2020	2021	2022	2023	2024	2025	SR	W–L
Grand Slam tournaments
Australian Open	A	A	2R	2R	A	SF	A	0 / 3	6–3
French Open	A	A	2R	A	A	2R	A	0 / 2	2–1
Wimbledon	A	NH	2R	A	A	A	A	0 / 1	1–1
US Open	A	A	3R	A	A	A	A	0 / 1	1–1
Win–loss	0–0	0–0	4–4	1–1	0–0	5–1	0–0	0 / 7	10–6
National representation
Summer Olympics	NH		A	NH		QF	NH	0 / 1	2–1
Career statistics
Tournaments	1	0	13	3	1	10	0	28	
Titles	0	0	0	0	0	0	0	0	
Finals	0	0	0	0	1	0	0	1	
Overall win–loss	2–1	0–0	14–11	2–3	3–1	11–9	0–0	32–25	
Year-end ranking	314	412	104	475	387	88	–	56%	

== ATP career finals ==
=== Doubles: 1 (1 runner-up) ===
Legend Grand Slam tournaments (0–0) ATP Masters 1000 (0–0) ATP 500 (0–0) ATP 250 (0–1)	Finals by surface Hard (0–1) Clay (0–0) Grass (0–0)

Result	W–L	Date	Tournament	Tier	Surface	Partner	Opponents	Score
Loss	0–1	Aug 2023	Los Cabos Open, Mexico	ATP 250	Hard	(Australia) Andrew Harris	(Mexico) Santiago González (France) Édouard Roger-Vasselin	4–6, 5–7

== ATP Challenger finals ==
=== Singles: 11 (5–6) ===
Finals by surface
Hard (2–3)
Clay (2–3)
Grass (1–0)

Result	W–L	Date	Tournament	Surface	Opponent	Score
Loss	0–1	Feb 2018	San Francisco, United States	Hard (i)	(Chinese Taipei) Jason Jung	4–6, 6–2, 6–7^{(5–7)}
Win	1–1	Jun 2019	Ilkley, United Kingdom	Grass	(Austria) Dennis Novak	3–6, 6–3, 7–6^{(7–5)}
Loss	1–2	Aug 2019	Aptos, United States	Hard	(United States) Steve Johnson	4–6, 6–7^{(4–7)}
Loss	1–3	Sep 2022	Cary, United States	Hard	(United States) Michael Mmoh	5–7, 3–6
Win	2–3	Nov 2022	Calgary, Canada	Hard (i)	(Australia) Aleksandar Vukic	6–2, 6–4
Win	3–3	Apr 2023	Mexico City, Mexico	Clay	(Argentina) Thiago Agustín Tirante	2–6, 6–4, 6–2
Loss	3–4	Apr 2023	San Luis Potosí, Mexico	Clay	(Chile) Tomás Barrios Vera	6–7^{(6–8)}, 5–7
Loss	3–5	May 2023	Prague, Czech Republic	Clay	(Czech Republic) Jakub Menšík	4–6, 3–6
Win	4–5	May 2023	Turin, Italy	Clay (Note: The final itself was played on indoor hard due to rain.)	(Italy) Federico Gaio	6–7^{(5–7)}, 6–2, 6–0
Loss	4–6	Nov 2023	Calgary, Canada	Hard (i)	(Canada) Liam Draxl	4–6, 3–6
Win	5–6	Jan 2024	Canberra, Australia	Hard	(Czech Republic) Jakub Menšík	6–3, 6–2

=== Doubles: 1 (1–0) ===
Finals by surface
Hard (1–0)
Clay (0–0)

Result	W–L	Date	Tournament	Surface	Partner	Opponents	Score
Win	1–0	Sep 2017	Columbus, United States	Hard (i)	(United States) Denis Kudla	(United Kingdom) Luke Bambridge (Republic of Ireland) David O'Hare	7–6^{(8–6)}, 7–6^{(7–3)}

== ITF Futures finals ==
=== Singles: 5 (4–1) ===
Finals by surface
Hard (3–0)
Clay (1–1)

Result	W–L	Date	Tournament	Surface	Opponent	Score
Win	1–0	Oct 2016	USA F32, Harlingen	Hard	(United Kingdom) Luke Bambridge	6–4, 6–4
Loss	1–1	Jan 2017	USA F5, Weston	Clay	(Bolivia) Hugo Dellien	2–6, 5–7
Win	2–1	Mar 2017	USA F5, Orlando	Clay	(United States) Tommy Paul	4–6, 6–3, 7–5
Win	3–1	Jul 2017	USA F24, Champaign	Hard	(New Zealand) Jose Statham	6–7^{(5–7)}, 6–2, 7–5
Win	4–1	Mar 2018	Canada F2, Sherbrooke	Hard (i)	(United States) Michael Redlicki	6–7^{(3–7)}, 7–5, 6–2

=== Doubles: 4 (1–3) ===
Finals by surface
Hard (1–2)
Clay (0–1)

Result	W–L	Date	Tournament	Surface	Partner	Opponents	Score
Win	1–0	Aug 2016	USA F27, Champaign	Hard	(United States) Jared Hiltzik	(United States) Tim Kopinski (United States) Alex Lawson	3–6, 6–3, [11–9]
Loss	1–1	Feb 2017	USA F7, Orlando	Clay	(Bolivia) Boris Arias	(United States) Connor Smith (United States) Rhyne Williams	6–3, 3–6, [8–10]
Loss	1–2	Mar 2017	USA F10, Bakersfield	Hard	(United States) Jared Hiltzik	(United States) Patrick Kawka (United States) Keegan Smith	3–6, 6–3, [6–10]
Loss	1–3	Jun 2017	USA F19, Winston-Salem	Hard	(Venezuela) Luis David Martínez	(United States) Christopher Eubanks (United States) Kevin King	3–6, 4–6

== Wins over top 10 players ==
- Koepfer has a 1–18 record against players who were, at the time the match was played, ranked in the top 10.

#	Player	Rank	Event	Surface	Rd	Score	Rank	Ref
2020
1.	(France) Gaël Monfils	9	Italian Open, Italy	Clay	2R	6–2, 6–4	97	

== National participation ==
=== Davis Cup (3–2) ===
Group membership Finals (1–2) Qualifying round (2–0)	Matches by type Singles (3–2) Doubles (0–0)	Matches by surface Hard (3–2) Clay (0–0)	Matches by venue Germany (1–0) Away (1–1) Neutral (1–1)

Date	Venue	Surface	Rd	Opponent nation	Score	Match	Opponent player	W/L	Rubber score
2020–21
Mar 2020	Düsseldorf	Hard (i)	QR	Belarus	4–1	Singles	Daniil Ostapenkov	Win	6–0, 6–2
Nov 2021	Innsbruck	Hard (i)	RR	Serbia	2–1	Singles	Filip Krajinović	Win	7–6^{(7–4)}, 6–4
Nov 2021	Innsbruck	Hard (i)	RR	Austria	2–1	Singles	Jurij Rodionov	Loss	1–6, 5–7
Dec 2021	Madrid	Hard (i)	SF	Russia	1–2	Singles	Andrey Rublev	Loss	4–6, 0–6
2024
Feb 2024	Tatabánya	Hard (i)	QR	Hungary	3–2	Singles	Fábián Marozsán	Win	6–2, 7–6^{(7–4)}
