= Federico Gaio =

Italian tennis player (born 1992)

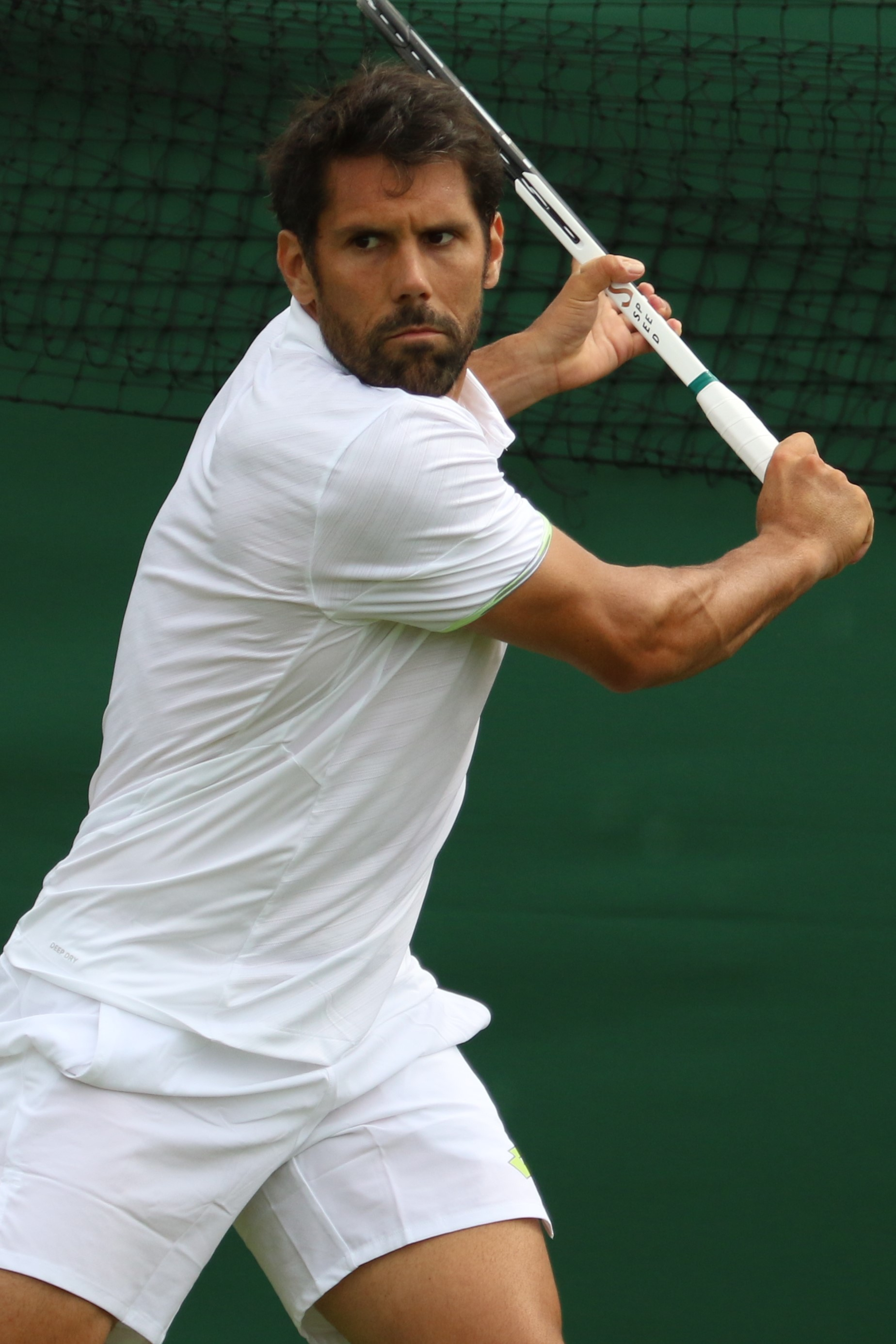
- Gaio at the 2023 Wimbledon Championships
- Full name: Federico Gaio
- Country (sports): Italy
- Residence: Faenza, Italy
- Born: 5 March 1992 (age 34) Faenza, Italy
- Height: 1.80 m (5 ft 11 in)
- Turned pro: 2009
- Retired: 2024 (last match played)
- Plays: Right-handed (one-handed backhand)
- Coach: Fabio Filippo Colangelo
- Prize money: $1,106,735

Singles
- Career record: 3–15
- Career titles: 0
- Highest ranking: No. 124 (3 February 2020)

Grand Slam singles results
- Australian Open: Q2 (2018, 2024)
- French Open: Q2 (2016)
- Wimbledon: Q3 (2021)
- US Open: 1R (2018, 2020)

Doubles
- Career record: 5–5
- Career titles: 0
- Highest ranking: No. 163 (2 November 2020)

Federico Gaio (Italian pronunciation: [fedeˈriːko ˈɡaːjo]; born 5 March 1992) is an Italian tennis coach and a former professional player. He reached his career high ATP singles ranking of World No. 124 in February 2020. He reached a career high in doubles of No. 163 on 2 November 2020, following his maiden ATP doubles final at the 2020 Rio Open partnering Salvatore Caruso. Was the coach of top ten player Jasmine Paolini in the second half of 2025, achieving with her a 1000 final in singles at Cincinnati Open and winning the 1000 doubles at China Open.

He competed mainly on the ATP Challenger Tour and the ITF circuit. He won four Challenger and nine ITF futures singles and three Challenger and four ITF futures doubles titles.

== Coaching ==
In July 2025 he began coaching top 10 player Jasmine Paolini;they parted ways in November 2025.

== Professional career ==
=== 2015: ATP debut ===
He played his first ATP main draw match in the 2015 Rome Open after gaining entry as a wildcard.

=== 2018: Grand Slam singles debut ===
He made his Grand Slam debut at the 2018 US Open as a qualifier where he lost to tenth seed David Goffin.

=== 2020: Maiden doubles ATP final ===
He reached his first doubles final at the ATP 500 2020 Rio Open partnering Salvatore Caruso where they lost to Horacio Zeballos/Marcel Granollers.

=== 2023: First Challenger final since 2021 ===
At the 2023 Piemonte Open Challenger 175 he reached his first final since July 2021 as a qualifier with a win over top seed and world No. 40 Sebastian Baez. As a result, he moved more than 100 positions up into the top 250 on 22 May 2023.

== ATP Tour career finals ==
=== Doubles: 1 (1 runner-up) ===
Legend Grand Slam tournaments (0–0) ATP Finals (0–0) ATP Masters 1000 (0–0) ATP 500 (0–1) ATP 250 (0–0)	Finals by surface Hard (0–0) Clay (0–1) Grass (0–0)	Finals by setting Outdoor (0–1) Indoor (0–0)

Result	W–L	Date	Tournament	Tier	Surface	Partner	Opponents	Score
Loss	0–1	Feb 2020	Rio Open, Brazil	ATP 500	Clay	(Italy) Salvatore Caruso	(Spain) Marcel Granollers (Argentina) Horacio Zeballos	4–6, 7–5, [7–10]

== ATP Challenger and ITF Futures/World Tennis Tour finals ==
=== Singles: 28 (13 titles, 15 runner-ups) ===
Legend ATP Challenger Tour (4–5) ITF Futures/WTT (9–10)	Finals by surface Hard (5–4) Clay (8–11) Grass (0–0) Carpet (0–0)

Result	W–L	Date	Tournament	Tier	Surface	Opponent	Score
Win	1–0	May 2011	Kazakhstan F2, Taraz	Futures	Hard	(Japan) Takuto Niki	0–6, 6–4, 6–2
Win	2–0	May 2011	Kazakhstan F3, Almaty	Futures	Hard	(Russia) Ilia Starkov	6–0, 7–5
Loss	2–1	Jun 2011	Israel F6, Ashkelon	Futures	Hard	(Israel) Amir Weintraub	4–6, 2–6
Win	3–1	Jul 2012	Argentina F18, Bell Ville	Futures	Clay	(Argentina) Renzo Olivo	7–5, 7–5
Loss	3–2	Jul 2013	Austria F2, Seefeld	Futures	Clay	(Austria) Patrick Ofner	5–7, 6–3, 4–6
Win	4–2	Sep 2013	Turkey F36, Antalya	Futures	Hard	(United Kingdom) Richard Gabb	3–6, 7–6^{(7–2)}, 6–1
Loss	4–3	Nov 2013	Greece F17, Heraklion	Futures	Hard	(Austria) Dennis Novak	4–6, 2–6
Loss	4–4	May 2014	France F9, Grasse	Futures	Clay	(France) Jonathan Eysseric	3–6, 4–6
Loss	4–5	Jul 2014	Italy F23, Modena	Futures	Clay	(Italy) Daniele Giorgini	3–6, 4–6
Loss	4–6	Aug 2014	Cortina, Italy	Challenger	Clay	(Serbia) Filip Krajinović	6–2, 6–7^{(5–7)}, 5–7
Win	5–6	Oct 2014	Turkey F36, Antalya	Futures	Hard	(Japan) Hiroyasu Ehara	1–6, 6–0, 6–4
Loss	5–7	Apr 2015	Croatia F7, Vrsar	Futures	Clay	(Italy) Riccardo Bellotti	4–6, 6–3, 4–6
Win	6–7	Apr 2015	Italy F5, Santa Margherita di Pula	Futures	Clay	(Italy) Stefano Napolitano	6–2, 6–4
Loss	6–8	May 2015	Italy F10, Bergamo	Futures	Clay	(Italy) Matteo Trevisan	4–6, 4–6
Win	7–8	Aug 2015	Italy F22, Appiano	Futures	Clay	(Italy) Francisco Bahamonde	6–4, 6–3
Win	8–8	Jul 2016	San Benedetto, Italy	Challenger	Clay	(France) Constant Lestienne	6–2, 1–6, 6–3
Win	9–8	Jul 2016	Biella, Italy	Challenger	Clay	(Brazil) Thomaz Bellucci	7–6^{(7–5)}, 6–2
Win	10–8	Sep 2017	Italy F29, Santa Margherita di Pula	Futures	Clay	(United Kingdom) Jay Clarke	6–2, 7–5
Win	11–8	Oct 2017	Italy F35, Santa Margherita di Pula	Futures	Clay	(Italy) Lorenzo Sonego	7–6^{(7–4)}, 2–6, 6–0
Loss	11–9	Jul 2018	Padova, Italy	Challenger	Clay	(Spain) Sergio Gutiérrez Ferrol	2–6, 6–3, 1–6
Loss	11–10	Jun 2019	Parma, Italy	Challenger	Clay	(Spain) Tommy Robredo	6–7^{(10–12)}, 7–5, 6–7^{(6–8)}
Win	12–10	Aug 2019	Manerbio, Italy	Challenger	Clay	(Italy) Paolo Lorenzi	6–3, 6–1
Win	13–10	Jan 2020	Bangkok, Thailand	Challenger	Hard	(Netherlands) Robin Haase	6–1, 4–6, 4–2 ret.
Loss	13–11	Jul 2021	Todi, Italy	Challenger	Clay	(Spain) Mario Vilella Martínez	6–7^{(3–7)}, 6–1, 3–6
Loss	13–12	Jan 2023	M25 Monastir, Tunisia	WTT	Hard	(Italy) Francesco Forti	3–6, 4–6
Loss	13–13	Feb 2023	M25 Vila Real de Santo Antonio, Portugal	WTT	Hard	(Portugal) Henrique Rocha	3–6, 1–6
Loss	13–14	May 2023	Turin, Italy	Challenger	Clay (Note: The final itself was played on indoor hard due to rain.)	(Germany) Dominik Köpfer	7–6^{(7–5)}, 2–6, 0–6
Loss	13–15	Jun 2024	M25 Grasse, France	WTT	Clay	(France) Maxime Chazal	6–4, 4–6, 2–6

=== Doubles: 18 (7 titles, 11 runner-ups) ===
Legend ATP Challenger Tour (3–6) ITF Futures/WTT (4–5)	Finals by surface Hard (3–6) Clay (4–5) Grass (0–0) Carpet (0–0)

Result	W–L	Date	Tournament	Tier	Surface	Partner	Opponents	Score
Loss	0–1	Oct 2008	Italy F34, Quartu Sant'Elena	Futures	Hard	(Italy) Alessandro Giannessi	(Italy) Fabio Colangelo (Italy) Matteo Volante	6–7^{(7–9)}, 1–6
Win	1–1	Sep 2009	Italy F29, Alghero	Futures	Hard	(Italy) Alessandro Giannessi	(Canada) Vasek Pospisil (United Kingdom) Marcus Willis	6–2, 7–5
Loss	1–2	Mar 2010	Italy F1, Trento	Futures	Hard (i)	(Italy) Alessandro Giannessi	(Belarus) Nikolai Fidirko (Austria) Nikolaus Moser	4–6, 4–6
Loss	1–3	Jul 2011	Recanati, Italy	Challenger	Hard	(India) Purav Raja	(Denmark) Frederik Nielsen (United Kingdom) Ken Skupski	4–6, 5–7
Loss	1–4	Jun 2012	Italy F12, Parma	Futures	Clay	(Italy) Matteo Volante	(Italy) Edoardo Eremin (Italy) Claudio Grassi	5–7, 2–6
Win	2–4	Sep 2013	Turkey F36, Antalya	Futures	Hard	(Lithuania) Laurynas Grigelis	(Israel) Dekel Bar (United Kingdom) Richard Gabb	1–6, 6–3, [10–8]
Win	3–4	Sep 2013	Turkey F37, Antalya	Futures	Hard	(Lithuania) Laurynas Grigelis	(Russia) Alexander Krasnorutskiy (Russia) Anton Manegin	6–3, 7–6^{(7–5)}
Loss	3–5	Mar 2015	Croatia F6, Rovinj	Futures	Clay	(Italy) Matteo Trevisan	(Croatia) Dino Marcan (Croatia) Antonio Šančić	3–6, 5–7
Loss	3–6	May 2015	Vicenza, Italy	Challenger	Clay	(Italy) Salvatore Caruso	(Argentina) Facundo Bagnis (Argentina) Guido Pella	2–6, 4–6
Loss	3–7	Jul 2015	Padova, Italy	Challenger	Clay	(Italy) Alessandro Giannessi	(Russia) Mikhail Elgin (Russia) Andrey Rublev	4–6, 6–7^{(4–7)}
Loss	3–8	Sep 2015	Szczecin, Poland	Challenger	Clay	(Italy) Alessandro Giannessi	(France) Tristan Lamasine (France) Fabrice Martin	3–6, 6–7^{(4–7)}
Win	4–8	Jul 2016	San Benedetto, Italy	Challenger	Clay	(Italy) Stefano Napolitano	(Argentina) Facundo Argüello (Peru) Sergio Galdós	6–3, 6–4
Win	5–8	Oct 2016	Rome, Italy	Challenger	Clay	(Italy) Stefano Napolitano	(Croatia) Marin Draganja (Croatia) Tomislav Draganja	6–7^{(5–7)}, 6–2, [10–3]
Win	6–8	Sep 2017	Italy F30, Santa Margherita di Pula	Futures	Clay	(Italy) Andrea Pellegrino	(Austria) Matthias Haim (Germany) Jakob Sude	7–6^{(7–1)}, 6–1
Win	7–8	Jun 2018	Caltanissetta, Italy	Challenger	Clay	(Italy) Andrea Pellegrino	(Slovenia) Blaž Rola (Czech Republic) Jiří Veselý	7–6^{(7–4)}, 7–6^{(7–5)}
Loss	7–9	Oct 2018	Tashkent, Uzbekistan	Challenger	Hard	(Spain) Enrique López Pérez	(Uzbekistan) Sanjar Fayziev (Uzbekistan) Jurabek Karimov	2–6, 7–6^{(7–3)}, [9–11]
Loss	7–10	Oct 2021	Brest Challenger, France	Challenger	Hard (i)	(Italy) Salvatore Caruso	(France) Sadio Doumbia (France) Fabien Reboul	6-4, 3–6, [3-10]
Loss	7–11	Feb 2023	M25 Vila Real de Santo Antonio, Portugal	WTT	Hard	(Italy) Jacopo Berrettini	(Belgium) Simon Beaupain (Argentina) Juan Bautista Otegui	2–6, 6–4, [8–10]
