= 2011 Carisap Tennis Cup =

- Date: July 4 – July 10
- Edition: 7th
- Location: San Benedetto del Tronto, Italy

Champions

Singles
- (Romania) Adrian Ungur

Doubles
- (Italy) Alessio di Mauro / (Italy) Alessandro Motti
- ATP Challenger San Benedetto

The 2011 Carisap Tennis Cup was a professional tennis tournament played on clay courts. It was part of the 2011 ATP Challenger Tour. It is the seventh edition of the tournament. It took place in San Benedetto del Tronto, Italy between July 4 and July 10, 2011.

== ATP entrants ==
=== Seeds ===
Country	Player	Rank^{1}	Seed
ARG	Carlos Berlocq	70	1
ESP	Pere Riba	71	2
ITA	Filippo Volandri	81	3
ARG	Máximo González	86	4
ARG	Diego Junqueira	108	5
FRA	Benoît Paire	115	6
ITA	Paolo Lorenzi	118	7
ITA	Alessio di Mauro	161	8

- ^{1} Rankings are as of June 20, 2011.

=== Other entrants ===
The following players received wildcards into the singles main draw:

- (Canada) Steven Diez
- (Italy) Daniele Giorgini
- (Italy) Stefano Travaglia
- (Italy) Filippo Volandri

The following players received entry as a special exempt into the singles main draw:

- (Italy) Alessandro Giannessi

The following players received entry from the qualifying draw:

- (Austria) Nikolaus Moser
- (Austria) Max Raditschnigg
- (Slovenia) Janez Semrajc
- (Italy) Matteo Trevisan

== Champions ==
=== Men's singles ===
(Romania) Adrian Ungur def. (Italy) Stefano Galvani, 7–5, 6–2

=== Men's doubles ===
(Italy) Alessio di Mauro / (Italy) Alessandro Motti def. (Italy) Daniele Giorgini / (Italy) Stefano Travaglia, 7–6^{(7–5)}, 4–6, [10–7]
