= Ante Pavić =

Croatian tennis player

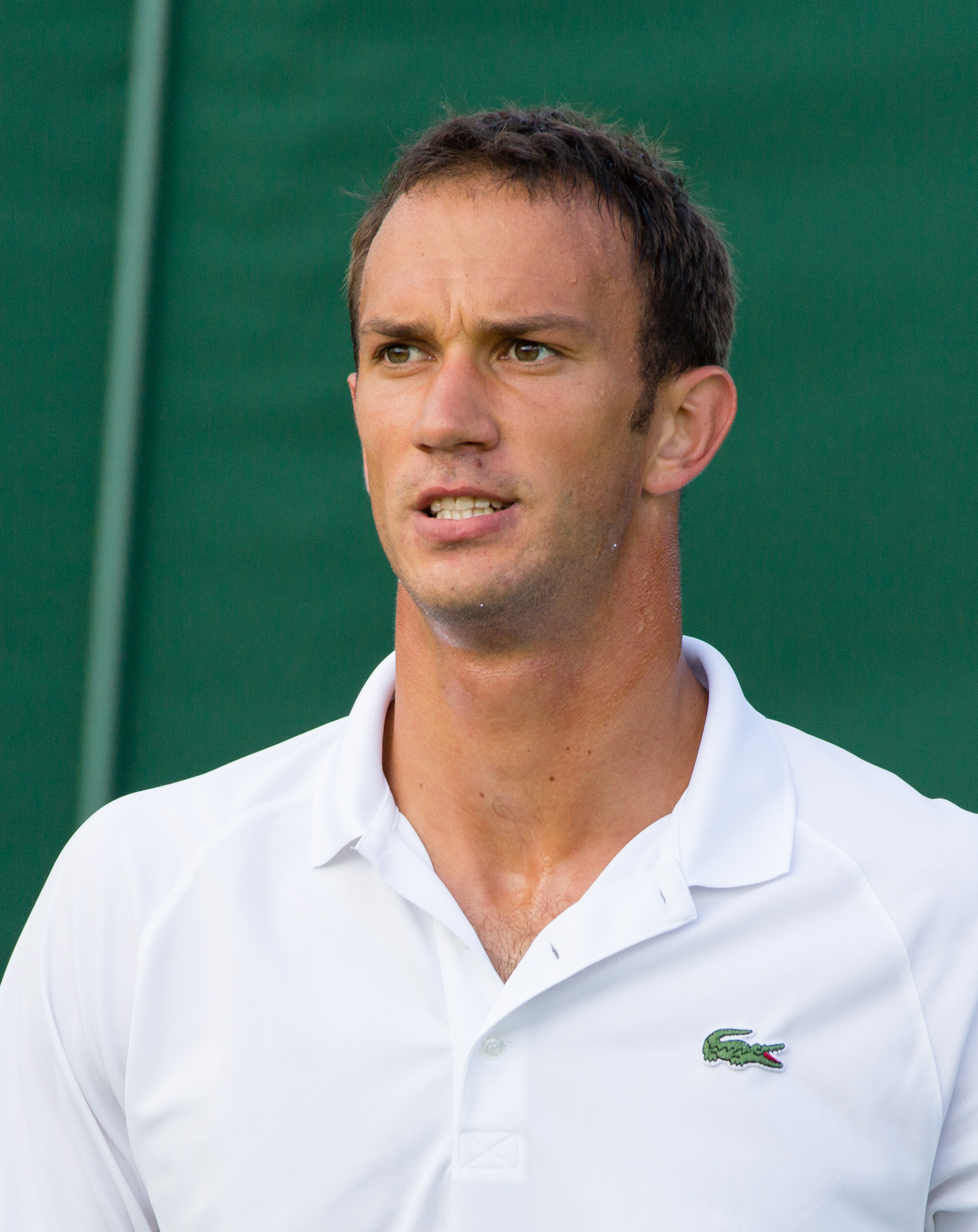
- Pavić at the 2015 Wimbledon qualifying tournament
- Country (sports): Croatia
- Born: 7 March 1989 (age 37) Ogulin, Croatia
- Height: 1.96 m (6 ft 5 in)
- Retired: 2021
- Plays: Right-handed
- Prize money: $472,795

Singles
- Career record: 3–11
- Career titles: 0
- Highest ranking: No. 132 (13 October 2014)

Grand Slam singles results
- Australian Open: Q2 (2014)
- French Open: 1R (2014)
- Wimbledon: 2R (2014)
- US Open: Q1 (2014, 2015, 2018)

Doubles
- Career record: 4–9
- Career titles: 0
- Highest ranking: No. 106 (6 January 2020)
- Last updated on: 3 January 2023.

Ante Pavić (Croatian pronunciation: [ǎːnte pǎːʋitɕ]; born 7 March 1989) is an inactive Croatian professional tennis player. His highest singles ranking is No. 132 achieved on 13 October 2014. He qualified for the main draw in the 2014 French Open after saving a match point in the final round of qualifying against Thanasi Kokkinakis.

== Challenger and Futures finals ==
=== Singles: 9 (5–4) ===
Legend (singles) ATP Challenger Tour (1–1) ITF Futures Tour (4–3)	Titles by surface Hard (4–4) Clay (0–0) Grass (0–0) Carpet (1–0)

Result	W–L	Date	Tournament	Tier	Surface	Opponent	Score
Win	1–0	Mar 2010	Switzerland F3, Vaduz	Futures	Carpet (i)	(Latvia) Andis Juška	6–3, 7–6^{(7–3)}
Win	2–0	Aug 2012	USA F23, Edwardsville	Futures	Hard	(United States) Eric Quigley	7–6^{(7–3)}, 7–5
Loss	2–1	Aug 2012	Canada F6, Winnipeg	Futures	Hard	(United States) Reid Carleton	6–2, 3–6, 3–6
Loss	2–2	Aug 2013	Canada F6, Winnipeg	Futures	Hard	(Australia) John-Patrick Smith	6–3, 4–6, 3–6
Loss	2–3	Oct 2013	Nigeria F1, Lagos	Futures	Hard	(Croatia) Borna Ćorić	4–6, 3–6
Win	3–3	Oct 2013	Nigeria F2, Lagos	Futures	Hard	(India) Jeevan Nedunchezhiyan	6–4, 6–3
Win	4–3	Nov 2013	Senegal F1, Dakar	Futures	Hard	(Austria) Maximilian Neuchrist	5–0 ret.
Loss	4–4	Mar 2014	Rimouski, Canada	Challenger	Hard (i)	(Australia) Sam Groth	6–7^{(3–7)}, 2–6
Win	5–4	Sep 2017	Columbus, USA	Challenger	Hard (i)	(United Kingdom) Alexander Ward	6–7^{(11–13)}, 6–4, 6–3

=== Doubles: 37 (26–11) ===
Legend (doubles) ATP Challenger Tour (11–5) ITF Futures Tour (15–6)	Titles by surface Hard (11–7) Clay (14–3) Grass (0–0) Carpet (1–1)

Result	W–L	Date	Tournament	Tier	Surface	Partner	Opponents	Score
Win	1–0	Sep 2008	Greece F4, Kefallonia	Futures	Hard	(Serbia) Ilija Vučić	(Netherlands) Peter Lucassen (Netherlands) Jan-Wouter Roep	6–3, 6–3
Win	2–0	Jul 2009	Germany F11, Cologne	Futures	Clay	(Bosnia and Herzegovina) Tomislav Brkić	(Argentina) Daniel Caracciolo (Germany) Jacek Szygowski	6–3, 7–6^{(7–2)}
Win	3–0	Aug 2010	Croatia F5, Vinkovci	Futures	Clay	(Croatia) Mislav Hižak	(Croatia) Toni Androić (Croatia) Marin Milan	6–3, 6–4
Win	4–0	Sep 2010	Croatia F6, Osijek	Futures	Clay	(Croatia) Mislav Hižak	(Croatia) Marin Draganja (Croatia) Dino Marcan	4–6, 6–2, [10–4]
Win	5–0	Feb 2011	Croatia F2, Zagreb	Futures	Hard (i)	(Croatia) Mislav Hižak	(Croatia) Mate Delić (Croatia) Kristijan Mesaroš	6–3, 6–7^{(3–7)}, [10–4]
Win	6–0	Apr 2011	Italy F5, Vercelli	Futures	Clay	(Italy) Erik Crepaldi	(Austria) Philipp Oswald (Austria) Bertram Steinberger	7–6^{(7–4)}, 6–7^{(4–7)}, [10–5]
Win	7–0	Jul 2011	Serbia F4, Kikinda	Futures	Clay	(Croatia) Mislav Hižak	(Serbia) Nikola Čačić (Montenegro) Goran Tošić	7–5, 7–5
Loss	7–1	Aug 2011	Croatia F6, Čakovec	Futures	Clay	(Croatia) Mislav Hižak	(Croatia) Marin Draganja (Croatia) Dino Marcan	7–6^{(7–4)}, 3–6, [3–10]
Loss	7–2	Sep 2011	Italy F28, Brusaporto	Futures	Carpet (i)	(Italy) Matteo Volante	(Italy) Enrico Iannuzzi (Italy) Luca Vanni	3–6, 7–6^{(7–4)}, [9–11]
Win	8–2	Oct 2011	Germany F15, Hambach	Futures	Carpet (i)	(Switzerland) Sandro Ehrat	(Germany) Marko Lenz (Germany) George von Massow	6–4, 6–2
Win	9–2	May 2012	Bosnia & Herzegovina F3, Brčko	Futures	Clay	(Croatia) Nikola Mektić	(Slovakia) Filip Horanský (Bosnia and Herzegovina) Aldin Šetkić	6–1, 6–3
Win	10–2	Aug 2012	Canada F6, Winnipeg	Futures	Hard	(Japan) Yuichi Ito	(Canada) Filip Peliwo (Canada) Milan Pokrajac	3–6, 6–3, [20–18]
Win	11–2	Sep 2012	Canada F8, Toronto	Futures	Hard	(Hungary) Márton Fucsovics	(United States) Chase Buchanan (United States) Tennys Sandgren	6–2, 6–4
Loss	11–3	Jun 2013	Slovenia F2, Maribor	Futures	Clay	(Slovenia) Janez Semrajč	(Austria) Lukas Jastraunig (Austria) Nicolas Reissig	6–3, 6–7^{(5–7)}, [9–11]
Loss	11–4	Jul 2013	Granby, Canada	Challenger	Hard	(United States) Adam El Mihdawy	(Canada) Érik Chvojka (Canada) Peter Polansky	4–6, 3–6
Loss	11–5	Aug 2013	Canada F5, Calgary	Futures	Hard	(Canada) Milan Pokrajac	(United States) Jean-Yves Aubone (United States) Dennis Nevolo	5–7, 3–6
Win	12–5	Aug 2013	Canada F6, Winnipeg	Futures	Hard	(Canada) Milan Pokrajac	(Canada) Filip Peliwo (Australia) David Sofaer	6–0, 4–6, [13–11]
Win	13–5	Oct 2013	Nigeria F1, Lagos	Futures	Hard	(South Africa) Ruan Roelofse	(Croatia) Borna Ćorić (Croatia) Dino Marcan	7–6^{(7–3)}, 6–2
Win	14–5	Oct 2013	Nigeria F2, Lagos	Futures	Hard	(South Africa) Ruan Roelofse	(Croatia) Borna Ćorić (Croatia) Dino Marcan	7–5, 6–3
Loss	14–6	Nov 2013	Tyumen, Russia	Challenger	Hard (i)	(Ukraine) Ivan Anikanov	(Belarus) Sergey Betov (Belarus) Aliaksandr Bury	4–6, 2–6
Loss	14–7	Jan 2014	Nouméa, New Caledonia	Challenger	Hard	(Slovenia) Blaž Rola	(United States) Austin Krajicek (United States) Tennys Sandgren	6–7^{(4–7)}, 3–6
Win	15–7	Oct 2014	Tashkent, Uzbekistan	Challenger	Hard	(Slovakia) Lukáš Lacko	(Germany) Frank Moser (Germany) Alexander Satschko	6–3, 3–6, [13–11]
Win	16–7	Nov 2016	Kobe, Japan	Challenger	Hard	(Germany) Daniel Masur	(India) Jeevan Nedunchezhiyan (Indonesia) Christopher Rungkat	4–6, 6–3, [10–6]
Loss	16–8	Jan 2017	France F2, Bressuire	Futures	Hard (i)	(South Africa) Ruan Roelofse	(France) Corentin Denolly (France) Hugo Nys	4–6, 2–6
Loss	16–9	Apr 2017	USA F13, Little Rock	Futures	Hard	(Canada) Philip Bester	(United Kingdom) Luke Bambridge (Australia) Gavin van Peperzeel	6–2, 3–6, [9–11]
Win	17–9	Jun 2017	Italy F15, Reggio Emilia	Futures	Clay	(Poland) Grzegorz Panfil	(United States) Alexander Centenari (Ecuador) Gonzalo Escobar	6–1, 7–6^{(7–4)}
Win	18–9	Nov 2017	Pune, India	Challenger	Hard	(Bosnia and Herzegovina) Tomislav Brkić	(Spain) Pedro Martínez (Spain) Adrián Menéndez Maceiras	6–1, 7–6^{(7–5)}
Win	19–9	May 2018	Puerto Vallarta, Mexico	Challenger	Hard	(Serbia) Danilo Petrović	(Zimbabwe) Benjamin Lock (Brazil) Fernando Romboli	6–7^{(2–7)}, 6–4, [10–5]
Win	20–9	Jun 2018	Poprad-Tatry, Slovakia	Challenger	Clay	(Bosnia and Herzegovina) Tomislav Brkić	(Serbia) Nikola Čačić (Switzerland) Luca Margaroli	6–3, 4–6, [16–14]
Loss	20–10	Jul 2018	Perugia, Italy	Challenger	Clay	(Bosnia and Herzegovina) Tomislav Brkić	(Italy) Daniele Bracciali (Italy) Matteo Donati	3–6, 6–3, [7–10]
Win	21–10	Jul 2018	Padova, Italy	Challenger	Clay	(Bosnia and Herzegovina) Tomislav Brkić	(Italy) Walter Trusendi (Italy) Andrea Vavassori	6–3, 7–6^{(7–4)}
Loss	21–11	Feb 2019	Dallas, USA	Challenger	Hard (i)	(South Africa) Ruan Roelofse	(United States) Marcos Giron (United States) Dennis Novikov	4–6, 6–7^{(3–7)}
Win	22–11	Jun 2019	Milan, Italy	Challenger	Clay	(Bosnia and Herzegovina) Tomislav Brkić	(Belarus) Andrei Vasilevski (Italy) Andrea Vavassori	7–6^{(8–6)}, 6–2
Win	23–11	Jul 2019	Perugia, Italy	Challenger	Clay	(Bosnia and Herzegovina) Tomislav Brkić	(Brazil) Rogério Dutra Silva (Poland) Szymon Walków	6–4, 6–3
Win	24–11	Jul 2019	Cordenons, Italy	Challenger	Clay	(Bosnia and Herzegovina) Tomislav Brkić	(Serbia) Nikola Ćaćić (Croatia) Antonio Šančić	6–2, 6–3
Win	25–11	Aug 2019	L'Aquila, Italy	Challenger	Clay	(Bosnia and Herzegovina) Tomislav Brkić	(Switzerland) Luca Margaroli (Italy) Andrea Vavassori	6–3, 6–2
Win	26–11	Sep 2019	Biella, Italy	Challenger	Clay	(Bosnia and Herzegovina) Tomislav Brkić	(Uruguay) Ariel Behar (Kazakhstan) Andrey Golubev	7–6^{(7–2)}, 6–4
