= Piemonte Open (tennis) =

Defunct tennis tournament
- Event name: Piemonte Open
- Location: Turin, Italy
- Venue: Circolo della Stampa Sporting
- Category: ATP Challenger Tour 175
- Surface: Clay
- Draw: 28S/16Q/16D
- Prize money: €227,270 (2025), $220,000+H (2023)
- Website: Website

The Piemonte Open was a professional tennis tournament played on clay courts. It was part of the ATP Challenger Tour 175 until 2025. It was first held in Turin, Italy in 2023.

== Past finals ==
=== Singles ===
Year	Champion	Runner-up	Score
2026	Not held		
2025	(Kazakhstan) Alexander Bublik	(China) Bu Yunchaokete	6–3, 6–3
2024	(Italy) Francesco Passaro	(Italy) Lorenzo Musetti	6–3, 7–5
2023	(Germany) Dominik Koepfer	(Italy) Federico Gaio	6–7^{(5–7)}, 6–2, 6–0

=== Doubles ===
Year	Champions	Runners-up	Score
2025	(Uruguay) Ariel Behar (Belgium) Joran Vliegen	(Netherlands) Robin Haase (Germany) Hendrik Jebens	6–2, 6–4
2024	(Finland) Harri Heliövaara (United Kingdom) Henry Patten	(Germany) Andreas Mies (United Kingdom) Neal Skupski	6–3, 6–3
2023	(Kazakhstan) Andrey Golubev (Ukraine) Denys Molchanov	(United States) Nathaniel Lammons (Australia) John Peers	7–6^{(7–4)}, 6–7^{(6–8)}, [10–5]
