= Internazionali di Tennis Country 2001 Team =

ATP Challenger Tour
- Event name: Internazionali di Tennis Country 2001 Team
- Location: Padua, Italy
- Category: ATP Challenger Tour
- Surface: Clay
- Draw: 32S/32Q/16D
- Website: website

The Internazionali di Tennis Country 2001 Team was a professional tennis tournament played on clay courts. It was part of the ATP Challenger Tour. It was held in Padua, Italy in 2018.

== Past finals ==
=== Singles ===
Year	Champion	Runner-up	Score
2018	(Spain) Sergio Gutiérrez Ferrol	(Italy) Federico Gaio	6–2, 3–6, 6–1

=== Doubles ===
Year	Champions	Runners-up	Score
2018	(Bosnia and Herzegovina) Tomislav Brkić (Croatia) Ante Pavić	(Italy) Walter Trusendi (Italy) Andrea Vavassori	6–2, 7–6^{(7–4)}
