= Sergio Gutiérrez Ferrol =

Spanish tennis player (born 1989)

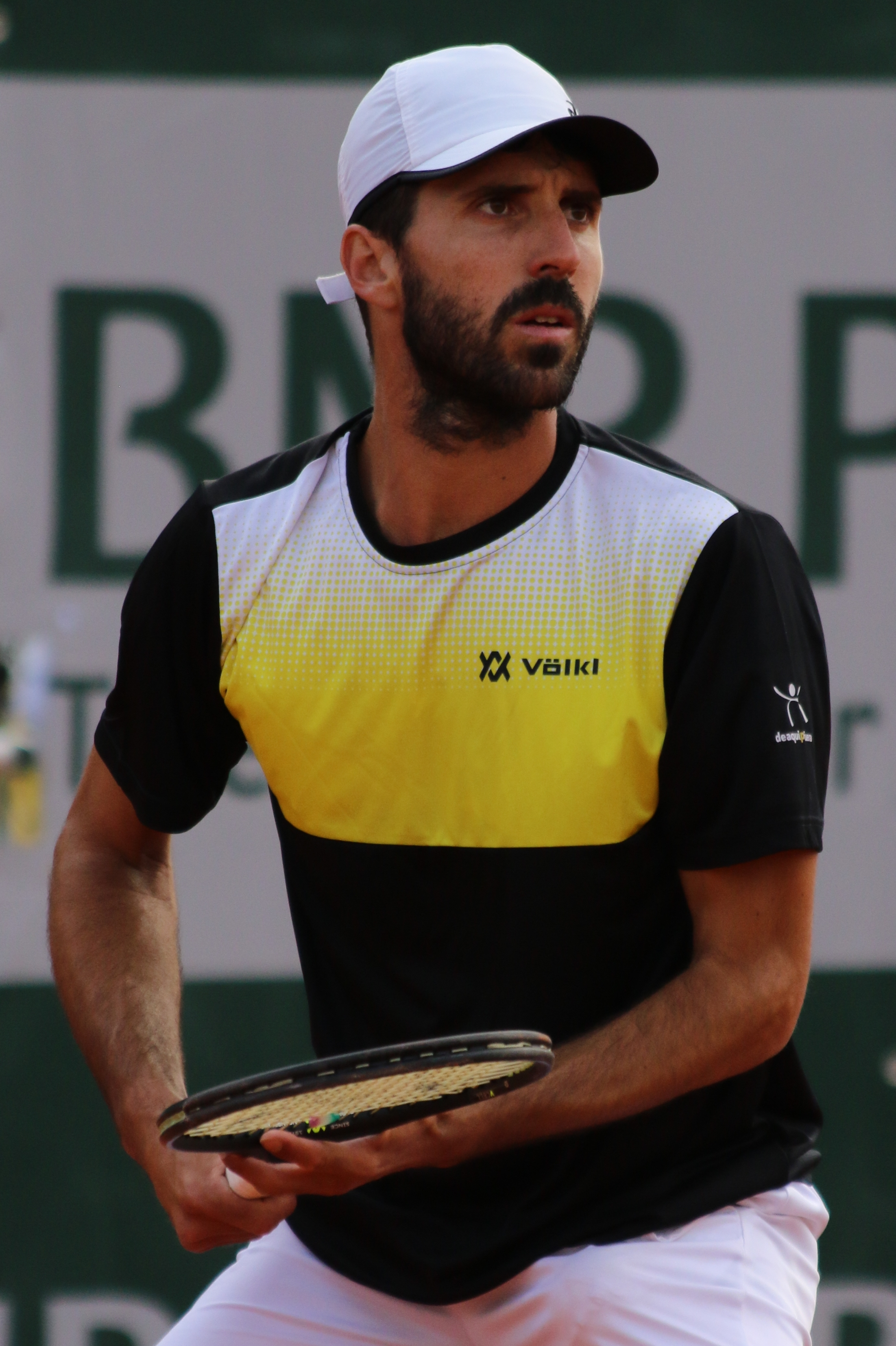
- Gutiérrez Ferrol at the 2019 French Open
- Country (sports): Spain
- Born: 5 March 1989 (age 36) Alicante, Spain
- Plays: Right-handed (two-handed backhand)
- Prize money: $222,180

Singles
- Career record: 2–2 (ATP Tour level, Grand Slam level, and Davis Cup)
- Career titles: 0
- Highest ranking: No. 156 (13 August 2018)
- Current ranking: No. 161 (5 November 2018)

Grand Slam singles results
- Australian Open: Q1 (2019)
- French Open: Q1 (2019)
- Wimbledon: Q1 (2018, 2019)
- US Open: Q3 (2012)

Doubles
- Career record: 0–0 (ATP Tour level, Grand Slam level, and Davis Cup)
- Career titles: 0
- Highest ranking: No. 413 (15 August 2011)
- Current ranking: No. 695 (5 November 2018)
- Last updated on: 5 November 2018.

Sergio Gutiérrez Ferrol (Spanish pronunciation: [ˈseɾxjo ɣuˈtjereθ feˈrol]; (Note: In isolation, Gutiérrez is pronounced [ɡuˈtjereθ].) born 5 March 1989) is a tennis player from Spain. He was Spanish junior champion in 2007 and has achieved a career-high singles ranking of World No. 156 in August 2018. His best result at tour level was reaching the quarterfinals of Casablanca.

== Career statistics ==
=== Singles: 2 (1-1) ===
Legend (singles) ATP Challenger Tour (1-1)	Titles by surface Hard (0-0) Clay (1-1) Grass (0–0) Carpet (0–0)

=== Challenger finals: 1 title, 1 runners-up ===
Outcome	No.	Date	Tournament	Surface	Opponent in the final	Score in the final
Runner–up	1.	22 July 2018	San Benedetto, Italy	Clay	(Colombia) Daniel Elahi Galán	2–6, 6–3, 2–6
Winner	1.	29 July 2018	Padova, Italy	Clay	(Italy) Federico Gaio	6–2, 3–6, 6–1

== Sources ==
- Sergio Gutiérrez Ferrol at the Association of Tennis Professionals
- Sergio Gutiérrez Ferrol at the International Tennis Federation
